= 2017 Los Angeles Dodgers season =

Major League Baseball season

2017 Los Angeles Dodgers
- National League champions National League West champions
- League: National League
- Division: West
- Ballpark: Dodger Stadium
- City: Los Angeles, California
- Record: 104–58 (.642)
- Divisional place: 1st
- Owners: Guggenheim Baseball Management
- President: Stan Kasten
- President of baseball operations: Andrew Friedman
- General managers: Farhan Zaidi
- Managers: Dave Roberts
- Television: SportsNet LA (Joe Davis, Charley Steiner, Orel Hershiser, Nomar Garciaparra) (Spanish audio feed) (Pepe Yñiguez, Fernando Valenzuela, Manny Mota); KTLA (occasional simulcasts)
- Radio: KLAC (Charley Steiner, Rick Monday, Kevin Kennedy); KTNQ (Jaime Jarrín, Jorge Jarrin)

The 2017 Los Angeles Dodgers season was the 128th for the franchise in Major League Baseball, and their 60th season in Los Angeles, California. They finished the season with the most wins in Los Angeles team history with a major league best 104 wins (fourth best in overall team history, tied with the 1942 team and behind only the 1953 Brooklyn Dodgers, 2019 Los Angeles Dodgers, 2021 Los Angeles Dodgers, and 2022 Los Angeles Dodgers). They won their fifth straight National League West championship and swept the Arizona Diamondbacks in three games in the NLDS. They advanced to the NLCS for the second year in a row and the third time in five seasons, where they faced the Chicago Cubs for the second year in a row. They defeated the Cubs in five games and advanced to the World Series for the first time since 1988, where they lost to the Houston Astros in seven games.

== Offseason ==
=== Roster departures ===
The day after the 2016 World Series several Dodgers instantly became free agents: Pitchers Kenley Jansen, Brett Anderson, Rich Hill, Jesse Chavez, Joe Blanton and J. P. Howell, second baseman Chase Utley, third baseman Justin Turner and outfielder Josh Reddick. On November 9, relief pitcher Chin-hui Tsao was outrighted to the minors and removed from the 40 man roster. On December 2, Louis Coleman was non-tendered. On December 9, infielder Charlie Culberson was outrighted to the minors and removed from the 40-man roster and on January 10, 2017, infielder Micah Johnson was designated for assignment and then traded to the Atlanta Braves. Pitcher Carlos Frías was designated for assignment on January 25 and traded to the Cleveland Indians on January 30.

=== Trades ===
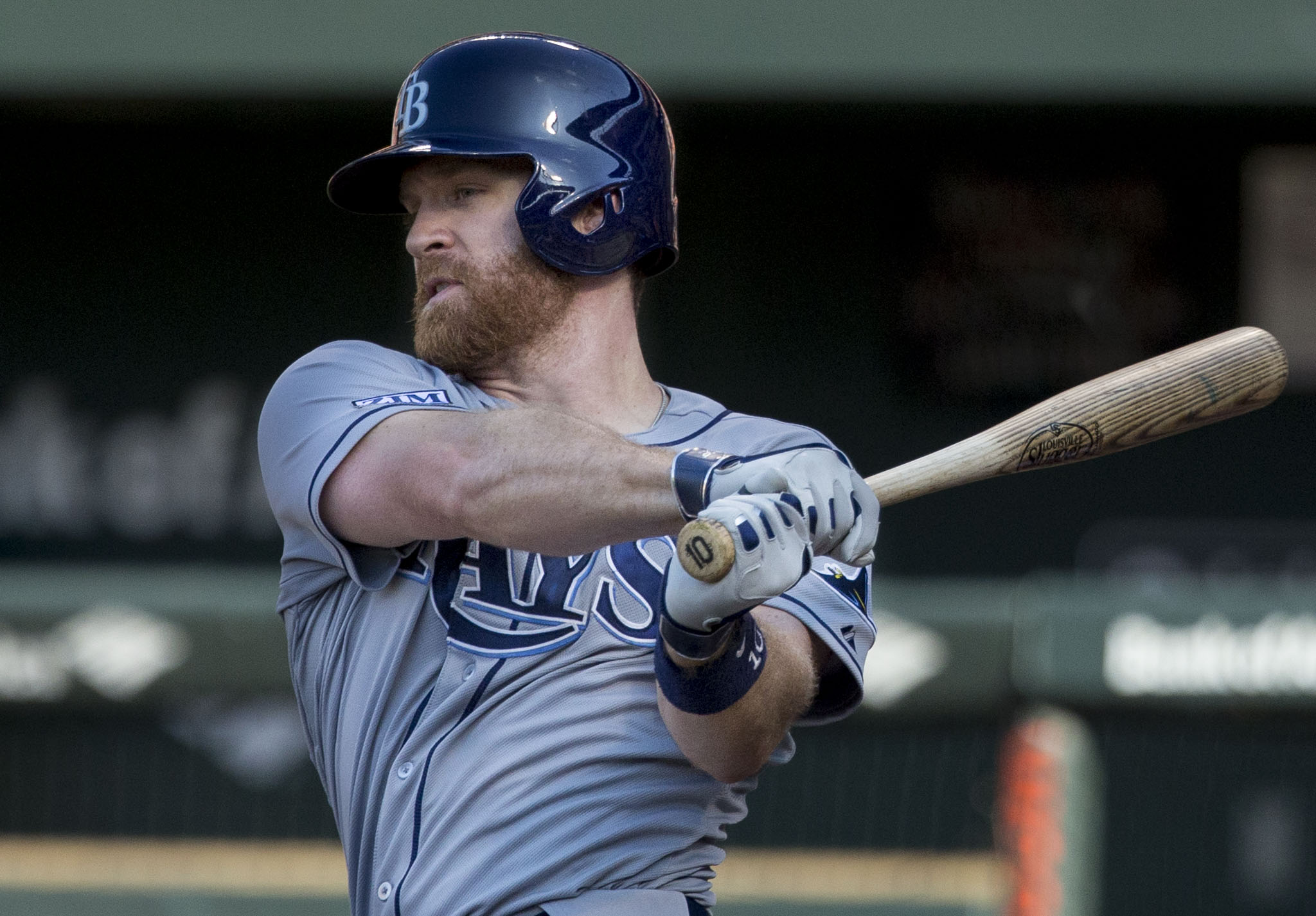
Logan Forsythe was acquired in a trade with the Rays on January 23

On November 7, 2016, the Dodgers traded catcher Carlos Ruiz to the Seattle Mariners for pitcher Vidal Nuño and on November 11, they traded infielder/outfielder Howie Kendrick to the Philadelphia Phillies in exchange for first baseman/outfielder Darin Ruf and minor leaguer Darnell Sweeney. Ruf was later sold to the Samsung Lions of the KBO League. On January 23, 2017, the Dodgers traded starting pitcher José De León to the Tampa Bay Rays in exchange for second baseman Logan Forsythe. On January 25, they acquired outfielder Brett Eibner from the Oakland Athletics in exchange for minor league infielder Jordan Tarsovich. On February 19, Nuño was traded to the Baltimore Orioles in exchange for minor league pitcher Ryan Moseley.

=== Free agent signings ===
On December 5, 2016, the Dodgers re-signed pitcher Rich Hill to a three-year, $48 million contract. On December 23, they re-signed third baseman Justin Turner to a four-year, $64 million, contract. On January 10, 2017, they announced the re-signing of relief pitcher Kenley Jansen to a five-year, $80 million, contract. On February 15, they signed relief pitcher Sergio Romo to a one-year, $3 million contract. Second baseman Chase Utley signed a one-year, $2 million, contract to rejoin the team on February 18, 2017. On February 20, they signed outfielder Franklin Gutiérrez to a one-year, $2.6 million, contract.

Off-season 40-man roster moves

Departing Player	Date	Transaction	New Team	Arriving player	Old team	Date	Transaction
Brett Anderson	November 3	Free agent	Chicago Cubs	Vidal Nuño	Seattle Mariners	November 7	Trade
Joe Blanton	November 3	Free agent	Washington Nationals	Darin Ruf	Philadelphia Phillies	November 11	Trade
Jesse Chavez	November 3	Free agent	Los Angeles Angels of Anaheim	Chase De Jong	Oklahoma City Dodgers	November 18	Added to 40 man roster
Rich Hill	November 3	Free agent	Los Angeles Dodgers	Kyle Farmer	Oklahoma City Dodgers	November 18	Added to 40 man roster
J. P. Howell	November 3	Free agent	Toronto Blue Jays	Jacob Rhame	Oklahoma City Dodgers	November 18	Added to 40 man roster
Kenley Jansen	November 3	Free agent	Los Angeles Dodgers	Rich Hill	Los Angeles Dodgers	December 5	Free-agent signing
Josh Reddick	November 3	Free agent	Houston Astros	Justin Turner	Los Angeles Dodgers	December 23	Free agent signing
Justin Turner	November 3	Free agent	Los Angeles Dodgers	Kenley Jansen	Los Angeles Dodgers	January 10	Free agent signing
Chase Utley	November 3	Free agent	Los Angeles Dodgers	Logan Forsythe	Tampa Bay Rays	January 23	Trade
Carlos Ruiz	November 3	Trade	Seattle Mariners	Brett Eibner	Oakland Athletics	January 25	Trade
Chin-hui Tsao	November 9	Outrighted to the minors and declared free agency	Long Island Ducks	Sergio Romo	San Francisco Giants	February 15	Free agent signing
Howie Kendrick	November 11	Trade	Philadelphia Phillies	Chase Utley	Los Angeles Dodgers	February 18	Free agent signing
Louis Coleman	December 2	Non-tendered	Cincinnati Reds	Franklin Gutiérrez	Seattle Mariners	February 20	Free agent signing
Charlie Culberson	December 9	Outrighted to the minors	Oklahoma City Dodgers				
Micah Johnson	January 13	Trade	Atlanta Braves				
José De León	January 23	Trade	Tampa Bay Rays				
Carlos Frías	January 25	Trade	Cleveland Indians				
Darin Ruf	February 17	Contract sold	Samsung Lions				
Vidal Nuño	February 19	Trade	Baltimore Orioles				

== Spring training ==
Spring training got underway for the Dodgers on February 15, 2017, when pitchers and catchers officially reported to Camelback Ranch to begin their workouts. The Dodgers made a trade early in spring training, sending pitcher Chase De Jong to the Seattle Mariners for minor league infielder Drew Jackson and minor league pitcher Aneurys Zabala. With most of the positions in the lineup locked in before camp, the major battle was for the last couple of spots in the starting rotation behind Clayton Kershaw, Rich Hill and Kenta Maeda. In the mix were veterans Brandon McCarthy, Scott Kazmir and Hyun-jin Ryu, all of whom were coming back from injuries as well as Alex Wood, Ross Stripling, Julio Urias and Brock Stewart. McCarthy and Ryu won the rotation spots, with Stripling and Wood in the bullpen to start.

Several members of the Dodgers organization participated in the 2017 World Baseball Classic during March. Kenley Jansen played for the Netherlands, Rob Segedin and Drew Maggi played for Italy, Ike Davis and Dean Kremer played for Israel, Enrique Hernández played for Puerto Rico and Adrián González, Sergio Romo and Alex Verdugo played for Mexico.

The Dodgers finished their Cactus League schedule with a record of 17–16–1 and wrapped up the pre-season with the Freeway Series against the Angels on April 1.

== Standings ==
=== National League West ===
NL West
Team	W	L	Pct.	GB	Home	Road
Los Angeles Dodgers	104	58	.642	—	57‍–‍24	47‍–‍34
Arizona Diamondbacks	93	69	.574	11	52‍–‍29	41‍–‍40
Colorado Rockies	87	75	.537	17	46‍–‍35	41‍–‍40
San Diego Padres	71	91	.438	33	43‍–‍38	28‍–‍53
San Francisco Giants	64	98	.395	40	38‍–‍43	26‍–‍55

=== National League Wild Card ===
Wild Card standings

Division leaders
Team	W	L	Pct.
Los Angeles Dodgers	104	58	.642
Washington Nationals	97	65	.599
Chicago Cubs	92	70	.568

Wild Card teams (Top 2 teams qualify for postseason)
Team	W	L	Pct.	GB
Arizona Diamondbacks	93	69	.574	+6
Colorado Rockies	87	75	.537	—
Milwaukee Brewers	86	76	.531	1
St. Louis Cardinals	83	79	.512	4
Miami Marlins	77	85	.475	10
Pittsburgh Pirates	75	87	.463	12
Atlanta Braves	72	90	.444	15
San Diego Padres	71	91	.438	16
New York Mets	70	92	.432	17
Cincinnati Reds	68	94	.420	19
Philadelphia Phillies	66	96	.407	21
San Francisco Giants	64	98	.395	23

=== Record vs. opponents ===
NL Records

2017 National League record Source: MLB Standings Grid – 2017
Team	AZ	ATL	CHC	CIN	COL	LAD	MIA	MIL	NYM	PHI	PIT	SD	SF	STL	WSH	AL
Arizona	—	2–4	3–3	3–3	11–8	11–8	3–4	4–3	6–1	6–1	4–3	11–8	12–7	3–4	2–4	12–8
Atlanta	4–2	—	1–6	3–3	3–4	3–4	11–8	4–2	7–12	6–13	2–5	5–2	4–3	1–5	9–10	9–11
Chicago	3–3	6–1	—	12–7	2–5	2–4	4–3	10–9	4–2	4–3	10–9	2–4	4–3	14–5	3–4	12–8
Cincinnati	3–3	3–3	7–12	—	3–4	0–6	2–5	8–11	3–4	4–2	13–6	3–4	4–3	9–10	1–6	5–15
Colorado	8–11	4–3	5–2	4–3	—	10–9	2–4	4–3	3–3	5–2	3–3	12–7	12–7	2–4	3–4	10–10
Los Angeles	8–11	4–3	4–2	6–0	9–10	—	6–1	3–3	7–0	4–3	6–1	13–6	11–8	4–3	3–3	16–4
Miami	4–3	8–11	3–4	5–2	4–2	1–6	—	2–4	12–7	8–11	3–4	5–1	5–1	2–5	6–13	9–11
Milwaukee	3–4	2–4	9–10	11–8	3–4	3–3	4–2	—	5–2	3–3	9–10	5–2	3–4	11–8	4–3	11–9
New York	1–6	12–7	2–4	4–3	3–3	0–7	7–12	2–5	—	12–7	3–3	3–4	5–1	3–4	6–13	7–13
Philadelphia	1–6	13–6	3–4	2–4	2–5	3–4	11–8	3–3	7–12	—	2–5	1–5	4–3	1–5	8–11	5–15
Pittsburgh	3–4	5–2	9–10	6–13	3–3	1–6	4–3	10–9	3–3	5–2	—	3–3	1–5	8–11	4–3	10–10
San Diego	8–11	2–5	4–2	4–3	7–12	6–13	1–5	2–5	4–3	5–1	3–3	—	12–7	3–4	2–5	8–12
San Francisco	7–12	3–4	3–4	3–4	7–12	8–11	1–5	4–3	1–5	3–4	5–1	7–12	—	3–4	1–5	8–12
St. Louis	4–3	5–1	5–14	10–9	4–2	3–4	5–2	8–11	4–3	5–1	11–8	4–3	4–3	—	3–3	8–12
Washington	4–2	10–9	4–3	6–1	4–3	3–3	13–6	3–4	13–6	11–8	3–4	5–2	5–1	3–3	—	10–10

== Regular season ==
Opening Day starters
Name	Position
Andrew Toles	Left fielder
Corey Seager	Shortstop
Justin Turner	Third baseman
Adrián González	First baseman
Logan Forsythe	Second baseman
Joc Pederson	Center fielder
Yasmani Grandal	Catcher
Yasiel Puig	Right fielder
Clayton Kershaw	Starting pitcher

=== April ===
The Dodgers began the 2017 season on April 3 at Dodger Stadium against the San Diego Padres. Clayton Kershaw made his seventh straight opening day start, tying Don Sutton for the most consecutive starts and Sutton and Don Drysdale for most overall opening day starts in franchise history. He allowed one unearned run in seven innings, while striking out eight. The Dodgers won 14–3 and Kershaw remained undefeated in openers. Joc Pederson hit a grand slam home run in the third inning, the first grand slam hit by a Dodger on opening day since Raúl Mondesí hit one in 1999. Switch-hitting Yasmani Grandal homered twice, one from each side of the plate. The first Dodger in history to do so on opening day and only the third to hit two opening day homers for the Dodgers in the same game, joining Mondesí (who did it twice, in 1995 and 1999) and Roy Campanella (1954). Clayton Richard pitched eight scoreless innings as the Padres evened the series with a 4–0 win in game two. Rich Hill allowed one run in five innings and Yasiel Puig hit his first home run of the season as the Dodgers won the next game 3–1. He hit two more homers the next day as the Dodgers took the series with a 10–2 rout of the Padres.

The Dodgers began their first road trip of the season on April 7 against the Colorado Rockies at Coors Field. Hyun-Jin Ryu made his first start since July 7, 2016, and he was going up against Kyle Freeland, who was making his major league debut for the Rockies. Ryu pitched 4 2/3 innings, allowing two runs on six hits. However, Freeland quieted the Dodgers offense, and struck out six batters, while only allowing one run in six innings as his team won the opener 2–1. The Rockies hit three home runs, including back to back blasts by Mark Reynolds and Gerardo Parra, off of Kershaw as they won 4–2 in the next game. The Dodgers avoided the sweep by beating the Rockies 10–6 in the series finale. They next traveled to Wrigley Field to play the defending champion Chicago Cubs. A walk-off single by Anthony Rizzo gave the Cubs a 3–2 win in the opener. After an off-day, the series resumed on April 12 with Brandon McCarthy and the bullpen shutting down the Cubs. Andrew Toles hit a lead-off home run to start the day, and the Dodgers made it hold up in a 2–0 victory. Addison Russell and Rizzo both homered for the Cubs as the Dodgers were unable to score off of former teammate Brett Anderson and lost 4–0 in the final game of the series.

The Dodgers returned home on April 14 for a pitching matchup between Kershaw and Zack Greinke of the Arizona Diamondbacks. Kershaw allowed one run on four hits over 8 1/3 innings while the Dodgers were not kind to their former pitcher and won 7–1. Puig homered and drove in four runs and Alex Wood pitched 3 1/3 scoreless innings of relief as the Dodgers won 8–4 on Jackie Robinson Day. The Dodgers were unable to get much offense against Taijuan Walker and Rich Hill left his second start of the season with a flare up of his recurring blister problem as the team lost 3–1. The Diamondbacks wound up with a series split thanks to Jake Lamb's tie-breaking homer in the 8th leading them to a 4–2 win. In the next game Nolan Arenado hit two homers off of a struggling Ryu and the Rockies beat the Dodgers 4–3. After a rough first inning, Kershaw struck out 10 in seven innings to help end the losing streak with a 4–2 win over the Rockies.

The Dodgers went back on the road to play the Diamondbacks at Chase Field on April 21. Corey Seager had three hits, including a home run, in the opener but the Dodgers bullpen collapsed, allowing nine runs in the eighth inning of a 13–5 loss. Kenta Maeda allowed four home runs the next game, including two by Yasmany Tomás, as the Diamondbacks rolled to an 11–5 win. McCarthy allowed two runs in seven innings and the Dodgers scored six runs in the fifth inning to avoid the sweep with a 6–2 win in the series finale. Hyun-jin Ryu allowed only one run and five hits in six innings against the San Francisco Giants at AT&T Park but still picked up his fourth loss of the season as the Giants won 2–1. The next day it was the Dodgers chance to win 2–1 behind Kershaw's strong performance. Alex Wood only gave up one hit in six scoreless innings on April 26, and left the game with a 3–0 lead only to see the bullpen falter. A two-run homer by Christian Arroyo in the seventh and a solo shot by Michael Morse in the eighth tied the game and the Giants won 4–3 on a walk-off sacrifice fly by Hunter Pence in the tenth inning. In the last game of the road trip, Julio Urías made his season debut, allowing only one run in 5 2/3 innings for the Dodgers who again went into extra innings. This time they scored four runs in the tenth to win the game 5–1 and split the four-game series with the Giants.

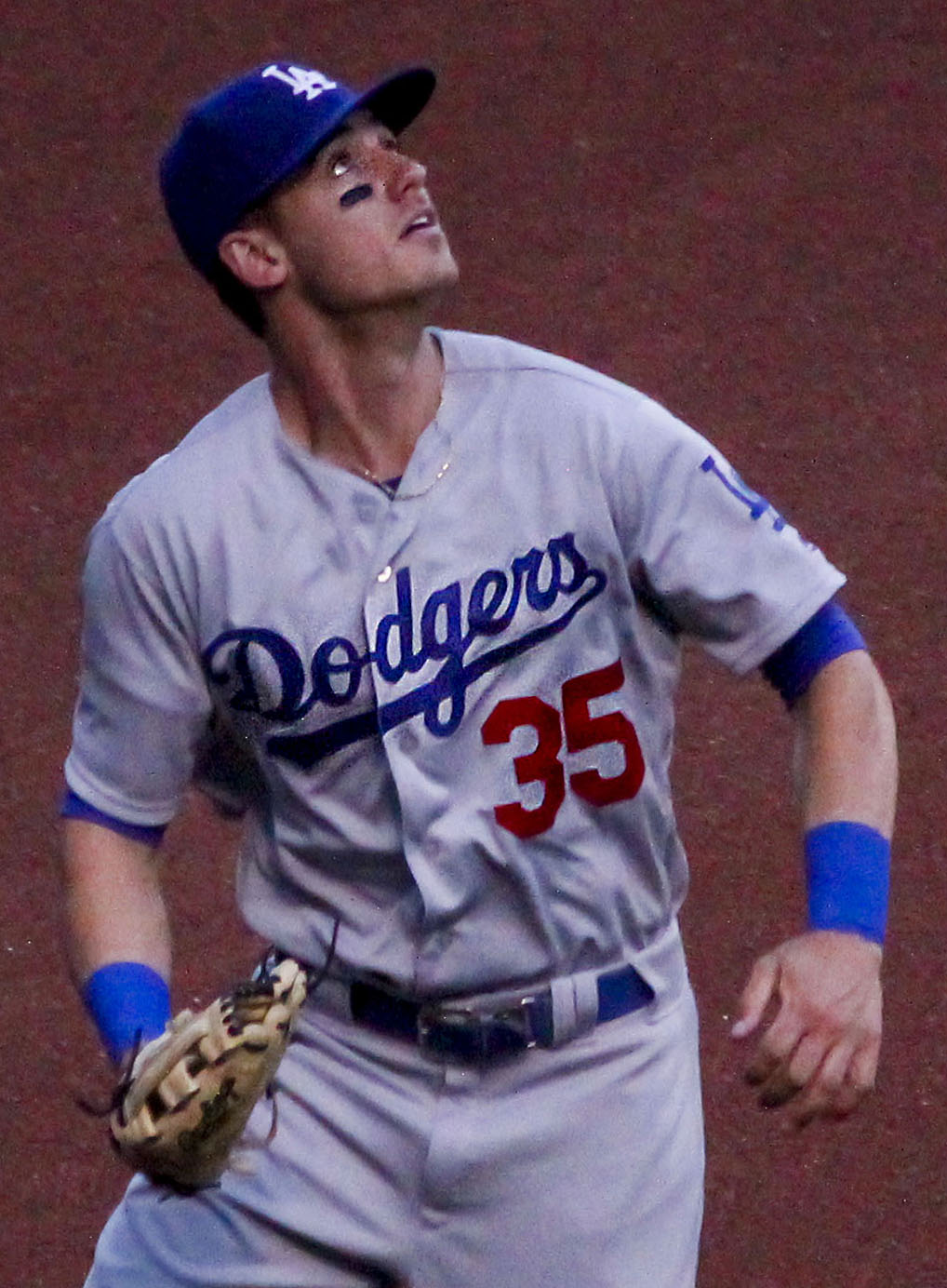
Cody Bellinger made his MLB debut on April 25

The Dodgers returned home to end the month with a three-game series against the Philadelphia Phillies beginning on April 28. Kenta Maeda reversed his recent string of poor starts by allowing only two runs in seven innings and Justin Turner had three hits and two RBIs in the 5–3 win. The Dodgers trailed 5–2 in the ninth of the next game and then hit three straight home runs (by Puig, Cody Bellinger and Turner) to tie the game against Phillies closer Héctor Neris. After Austin Barnes and Seager singled with Chris Taylor striking out and Andrew Toles flying out, Dodgers walked off with a 6–5 win with Adrián González hitting an infield single. The Dodgers wrapped up the month of April with a 5–3 win and a series sweep of the Phillies. Ryu picked up his first win since 2014 and Toles and Taylor hit home runs in the game.

=== May ===
The Giants beat the Dodgers 4–3 on May Day as Clayton Kershaw allowed two home runs. The Dodgers got back on the winning track the next day as Yasiel Puig drove in four runs, Cody Bellinger hit a three-run triple and Franklin Gutiérrez homered in his first at-bat after coming off the disabled list in a 13–5 win. On May 3, the Dodgers had a ceremony to add longtime announcer Vin Scully to the ring of honor. They then went out and had a pitching duel as Jeff Samardzija and Julio Urías matched each other and the game was tied at one after nine innings. Gorkys Hernández hit an RBI double off of reliever Grant Dayton in the 11th that led to three runs scoring and the Giants took the series with a 4–1 win.

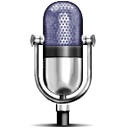
Vin
Scully
Broadcaster

Honored
May 3, 2017

On May 5 at Petco Park, Kenta Maeda allowed only one earned run in five innings while striking out eight batters and Cody Bellinger hit two home runs as the Dodgers beat the San Diego Padres 8–2. He hit a grand slam in the next game as the Dodgers routed the Padres 10–2. Kershaw allowed only one run in 7 1/3 innings in the game. The final scheduled game of the brief roadtrip was rained out and rescheduled for September 2.

The Dodgers returned home on May 8 for a series against the Pittsburgh Pirates. Alex Wood struck out 11 batters in five innings. This was a Dodger record for most strikeouts in a start of five or fewer innings, breaking the mark previously held by Sandy Koufax (1961) and Vicente Padilla (2009). Chris Taylor hit a grand slam in the first inning and the Dodgers cruised to a 12–1 win. Julio Urías took a no-hitter into the 7th in the next game, but was broken up by the Pirates, who scored two runs in the 7th to tie the game and John Jaso hitting the go-ahead home run an inning later to lead 3–2. At the bottom of the 9th inning, Cody Bellinger drove in Corey Seager with a game-tying single, sending the game in extras and Austin Barnes drove in pinch runner Ross Stripling with a walk-off double in the 10th for a 4–3 Dodgers win. Bellinger homered again in the next game and Maeda allowed two runs in 8 1/3 innings as the Dodgers finished off the series sweep with a 5–2 win.

The Dodgers next played the Colorado Rockies at Coors Field. Hyun-jin Ryu had the worst start of his career, allowing 10 runs (5 earned) in four innings as the Rockies won 10–7. The Dodgers came back with a five-run second inning the next day, leading to a 6–2 win as Kershaw allowed two runs and seven hits in seven innings for his sixth win of the season. Alex Wood struck out 10 in six scoreless innings while the Dodgers shutout the Rockies 4–0 on May 13. Pat Valaika hit two homers and Nolan Arenado also went deep as the Rockies won 9–6 on Mother's Day to split the series. The Dodgers lost again the next day, dropping the opener of a series against the San Francisco Giants 8–4. Ty Blach allowed only one run in seven innings as the Giants took the next game 2–1. The Dodgers avoided the sweep by winning the last game 6–1 behind seven scoreless innings by Kershaw.

The Dodgers returned home to begin a 10-game homestand, starting with a four-game weekend series against the Miami Marlins. They defeated the Marlins in the first game 7–2. Yasiel Puig hit a two-run home run in the second inning, Ryu pitched well enough to get the win and Kenley Jansen pitched an immaculate inning in the ninth. Alex Wood pitched another 7 1/3 scoreless innings, extending his streak to 20 1/3 innings and the Dodgers hit three home runs (Taylor, Brett Eibner and Bellinger) to beat the Marlins 7–2 for the second straight day. Julio Urías struggled in the next game, allowing seven runs in only 2 1/3 innings. Seager and Bellinger hit back-to-back home runs in the seventh but it wasn't enough as the Dodgers lost 10–6. Bellinger became the fastest player in Dodgers history to hit nine home runs. In the series finale, Adrián González was 3 for 4 with three RBI and Joc Pederson homered as the Dodgers won 6–3 to take the series. After an off-day, the Dodgers continued their homestand with a three-game series with the St. Louis Cardinals. In the opener, Kershaw allowed only one run on three hits while striking out 10 in nine innings but was matched by Lance Lynn of the Cardinals who allowed one run on two hits with 10 strikeouts in eight innings. The Dodgers eventually won 2–1 on a walk-off double by Logan Forsythe, who came off the disabled list before the game, in the 13th inning. The following day, Mike Leake allowed only four hits in eight innings while Rich Hill struggled, walking seven, a career high, and allowing five runs in only four innings, as the Cardinals won 6–1 to even the series. In the series finale, the Dodgers came back from a 3–0 deficit to take the series with a 7–3 win. Kenta Maeda's two run RBI single in the fourth put the Dodgers ahead for good and Hyun-Jin Ryu pitched four scoreless innings out of the bullpen to earn his first major league save. The Dodgers would conclude their 10-game homestead with a 3-day weekend series with the Chicago Cubs. Wood continued his streak of scoreless innings, allowing only two hits while striking out eight in the opener of a weekend series against the Chicago Cubs. Chase Utley and Adrián González homered in the Dodgers 4–0 shutout win. The Dodgers won the next game as well. McCarthy and Stripling combined to shut down the Cubs, with Stripling getting his first career save with three innings of relief. Utley drove in three runs and Chris Taylor hit his sixth home run of the season in the 5–0 victory. The Dodgers wrapped up their long homestand with a 9–4 win and a series sweep of the Cubs for the first time since the 2012 season. Kershaw struggled, giving up four runs, and failed to make it out of the fifth inning, but Bellinger hit his 10th home run of the season, the fastest Dodger to reach that mark in franchise history, and Kike Hernández, Austin Barnes and Puig also homered in the game.

The Dodgers embarked on a seven-game road trip, starting with a four-game series against the Cardinals at Busch Stadium. Rich Hill allowed one run in five innings and Utley, Bellinger and Forsythe each homered in the 5–1 win on Memorial Day. With his ninth homer of the month, Bellinger moved into a three-way tie with Pederson (May 2015) and James Loney (September 2007) for most home runs by a Dodger rookie in a calendar month. The Dodgers beat the Cardinals 9–4 in the next game thanks to seven different Dodgers getting RBIs and the bullpen pitching five innings of one-run ball after Maeda struggled early. With the win and the Rockies loss earlier in the day, the Dodgers moved into sole possession of first place in the National League West Division for the first time all season. The Dodgers six game winning streak came to an end with a 2–1 loss to the Cardinals on May 31. Dexter Fowler's solo homer in the eighth inning accounted for the winning run.

=== June ===
The Dodgers began the month of June with a 2–0 loss to the Cardinals. Adam Wainwright and three relievers shut down the Dodgers on five hits and nine strikeouts and Wainwright also accounted for the only scoring in the game by hitting a two-run home run in the second inning off of Brandon McCarthy. Clayton Kershaw picked up his 2,000th career strikeout in the second inning of the next game, as he retired Jonathan Villar of the Milwaukee Brewers. He finished the day with 14 strikeouts in seven innings, but allowed a solo homer by Domingo Santana, one of only two batters to get hits off him. Yasmani Grandal tied the game in the ninth with a homer, his sixth of the season, and Cody Bellinger won it in the 12th with his 12th homer of the season. The Dodgers pitchers recorded a franchise record 26 strikeouts in the game and Kenley Jansen set a new major league record with his 36th strikeout to start the season without issuing a walk. The Dodgers beat the Brewers 2–1 at Miller Park. In the following game, the Brewers took a lead on a grand-slam by Travis Shaw in the seventh inning only for the Dodgers to fight back with a grand slam of their own by Chris Taylor in the ninth inning. They held on for a 10–8 win. The Brewers took the last game of the series, 3–0, as Zach Davies shut down the Dodgers on three hits over seven innings and Eric Thames and Santana homered.

The Dodgers returned home on June 5 to open a series against the team with the best record in the National League, the Washington Nationals. Hyun-jin Ryu got the start and went seven innings for the first time since the 2014 season but the offense disappeared again and the Dodgers lost 4–2. Max Scherzer struck out 14 Dodgers batters in seven innings as the Nationals also took game two, 2–1. The Dodgers managed to win the final game of the series, 2–1, in a prime pitching matching between Clayton Kershaw and Stephen Strasburg. Strasburg struck out eight in six innings while Kershaw struck out nine in seven innings and the Dodgers got only three hits to five for the Nationals. Justin Turner came off the disabled list to hit a two-run home run in his first at-bat as the Dodgers won the opener of a three-game series against the Cincinnati Reds, 7–2. Rich Hill and Kenta Maeda (in his first career relief appearance) combined on a five hitter. Maeda picked up the save, and along with Ryu's earlier performance the Dodgers had two pitchers with four inning saves for the first time since Matt Herges and Alan Mills did so in the 2000 season. Corey Seager's first career walk off hit gave the Dodgers a 5–4 win the next night. In the next game, he hit a grand slam homer to put the Dodgers ahead and Bellinger hit two homers of his own as the Dodgers won 9–7.

Bellinger again hit two homers in the very next game, on June 13 in the Dodgers 7–5 victory over the Cleveland Indians at Progressive Field. He became the first Dodger player to hit two home runs in back-to-back games since Adrián Beltré in the 2004 season and by reaching the mark in 45 games he was the fastest player in MLB history with four career multi-homer games, besting Bob Horner who did so in 63 games in 1978. A pinch hit homer by Kike Hernández in the 8th inning gave the Dodgers the lead the next day, in a game they won 6–4. However, the Dodgers winning streak came to an end on June 15 when the Indians scored seven runs off Rich Hill in four innings and Lonnie Chisenhall clubbed a three-run homer off of reliever Ross Stripling en route to a 12–5 Cleveland victory. Joc Pederson homered and Alex Wood allowed only one run in eight innings pitched as the Dodgers won 3–1 over the Cincinnati Reds at Great American Ball Park the next day. The Dodgers scored five runs in the top of the third inning in the next game as they beat the Reds 10–2. Bellinger and Pederson hit back-to-back homers and Yasiel Puig homered twice in the win. The Dodgers finished the road trip with an 8–7 win over the Reds, sweeping the series and finishing with a 5–1 Ohio road trip.

The Dodgers returned home to start a nine-game homestand, starting with a four-game series with the New York Mets. Kershaw allowed a career high four home runs, but the Dodgers offense picked up the slack, as they won 10–6. Bellinger hit two home runs to record his fifth multi-homer game, while Justin Turner and Chris Taylor also homered. Bellinger became the fastest player in MLB history to hit 21 homers, passing Wally Berger (1930). He homered again in the next game, becoming the first rookie in MLB history to hit 10 homers in 10 games. Corey Seager homered three times as well as the Dodgers beat the Mets 12–0. In the third game, Yasmani Grandal homered twice while Puig hit a three-run home run and the Dodgers beat the Mets 8–2. In the series finale, Joc Pederson hit a go-ahead homer in the seventh inning as the Dodgers extended their winning streak to a season high seven games with a 6–3 win. This was the Dodgers first four-game series sweep of the Mets since the 1979 season. The Dodgers continued their homestand with a three-game weekend series with the Colorado Rockies. Alex Wood allowed one run in six innings pitched, while Yasiel Puig homered and Justin Turner had three hits as the Dodgers beat the Rockies 6–1. This was the 15th straight game the Dodgers had hit at least one homer in, their longest streak since 1977. The following day, Kershaw pitched six scoreless innings with eight strikeouts to pick up his eleventh win as the Dodgers beat the Rockies 4–0. Pederson extended the Dodgers homer streak to 16 with a solo shot in the third, and the Dodgers won their 50th game of the season, the third fastest team to reach that mark in Los Angeles franchise history behind only the 1974 and 1977 seasons. In the series finale, McCarthy struggled with his command early and the Dodgers fell behind 5–0 after three innings but they battled back behind two more homers by Bellinger (his sixth multi-homer game as a rookie, setting a new Dodgers franchise record) and scored five runs off four Adam Ottavino wild pitches in the seventh and eighth to win the game 12–6. The Dodgers extended their winning streak to a season-high 10 games, making it three straight series sweep, and the five runs scored on wild pitches was the most by any team since 1920. At four hours and nineteen minutes, this was the longest nine-inning game in Dodger Stadium history. The streak came to an end the next day as the Dodgers dropped the opener of an interleague series against the crosstown rival Los Angeles Angels, 4–0. Ricky Nolasco shut down the Dodgers, allowing only five hits in 6 1/3 innings as the homer streak was snapped at 17, second longest in team history. The Dodgers finished off the homestand with a 4–0 victory over the Angels. Kenta Maeda pitched seven scoreless innings and Joc Pederson hit a three-run homer.

The series moved south to Angel Stadium in Anaheim for the following game. The Dodgers managed just four hits off Angels pitching, including solo homers by Yasmani Grandal and Trayce Thompson. They lost 3–2 when Ben Revere reached base on a fielding error in the bottom of the ninth, advanced to second on a wild pitch and then scored when Grandal committed a throwing error after a dropped third strike. Clayton Kershaw struck out 12 batters in seven innings while the Dodgers hit three home runs en route to a 6–2 win and a split of the series with the Angels. They reached 50 home runs hit in the month, a new franchise record for a single month. The Dodgers next traveled to San Diego to play a weekend series with the San Diego Padres at Petco Park. Alex Wood allowed only one run on two hits in six innings while striking out eight. Austin Barnes recorded his first multi-homer game of his career with two home runs (his first career grand slam and a three-run home run) and seven RBIs and Justin Turner had three hits including a two-run home run in the 10–4 win. Wood was the first Dodgers pitcher to open a season with nine wins and no losses since Rick Rhoden in 1976. The 21 wins in the month of June tied the all-time franchise record also set in 1952, 1954 and 1973.

=== July ===
The Dodgers began the month with an 8–0 win over the Padres. Rich Hill pitched seven scoreless innings, striking out 11, while Corey Seager, Justin Turner, and Chris Taylor homered. Manager Dave Roberts was suspended for the game after an altercation with Padres manager Andy Green in the previous game. The Dodgers dropped the final game of the series, 5–3 to the Padres behind an ineffective Kenta Maeda. José Pirela and Manuel Margot provided early offense for the Padres, each driving in two runs to back up Jhoulys Chacín.

The Dodgers returned home on Independence Day to begin a six-game homestand, starting with a three-game series with the Arizona Diamondbacks, who had the second best record in the division coming into the game. Clayton Kershaw pitched seven scoreless innings, allowing two hits and striking out 11 batters while Justin Turner and Yasmani Grandal drove in two runs each and the Dodgers won 4–3. In the next game, Alex Wood pitched seven scoreless innings, allowing three hits and striking out 10 batters while Grandal provided the only offense with an RBI double in the 1–0 win. Wood became the first Dodgers starting pitcher to begin the season 10–0 since Don Newcombe in 1955. In the series finale, Hill allowed only one run on two hits in seven innings with nine strikeouts but Robbie Ray also pitched well, with one run and 13 strikeouts in six innings. The Diamondbacks pulled ahead off the Dodgers bullpen to lead 4–1 heading into the ninth but the Dodgers rallied against their closer Fernando Rodney and Chris Taylor's walk-off single with the bases loaded gave the Dodgers a 5–4 win and a sweep of the Diamondbacks. The Dodgers concluded the homestand and the first half of the season with a three-game weekend interleague series against the Kansas City Royals. Maeda rebounded from his last start, allowing one run on four hits in five innings as the Dodgers won the first game 4–1. Chase Utley recorded his 1,000 career RBI in the game. The Dodgers won the next game 5–4 on a walk-off walk in the 10th inning. Cody Bellinger hit his 25th home run in the game and Brandon McCarthy allowed only one earned run on six hits in six innings. It was the 60th victory for the Dodgers on the season, the first team in the majors to reach that mark in 2017 and joining the 1973 and 1974 teams as the only Dodgers teams to reach that mark before the all-star break. The Dodgers wrapped up the first half of the season with a 5–2 win and series sweep over the Royals. Kershaw pitched his first complete game of the season and in the process became the first pitcher in MLB history to strike out at least 13 batters in a complete game of less than 100 pitches. Justin Turner hit two home runs in the game as the Dodgers went into the break with a 61–29 record, best in MLB.

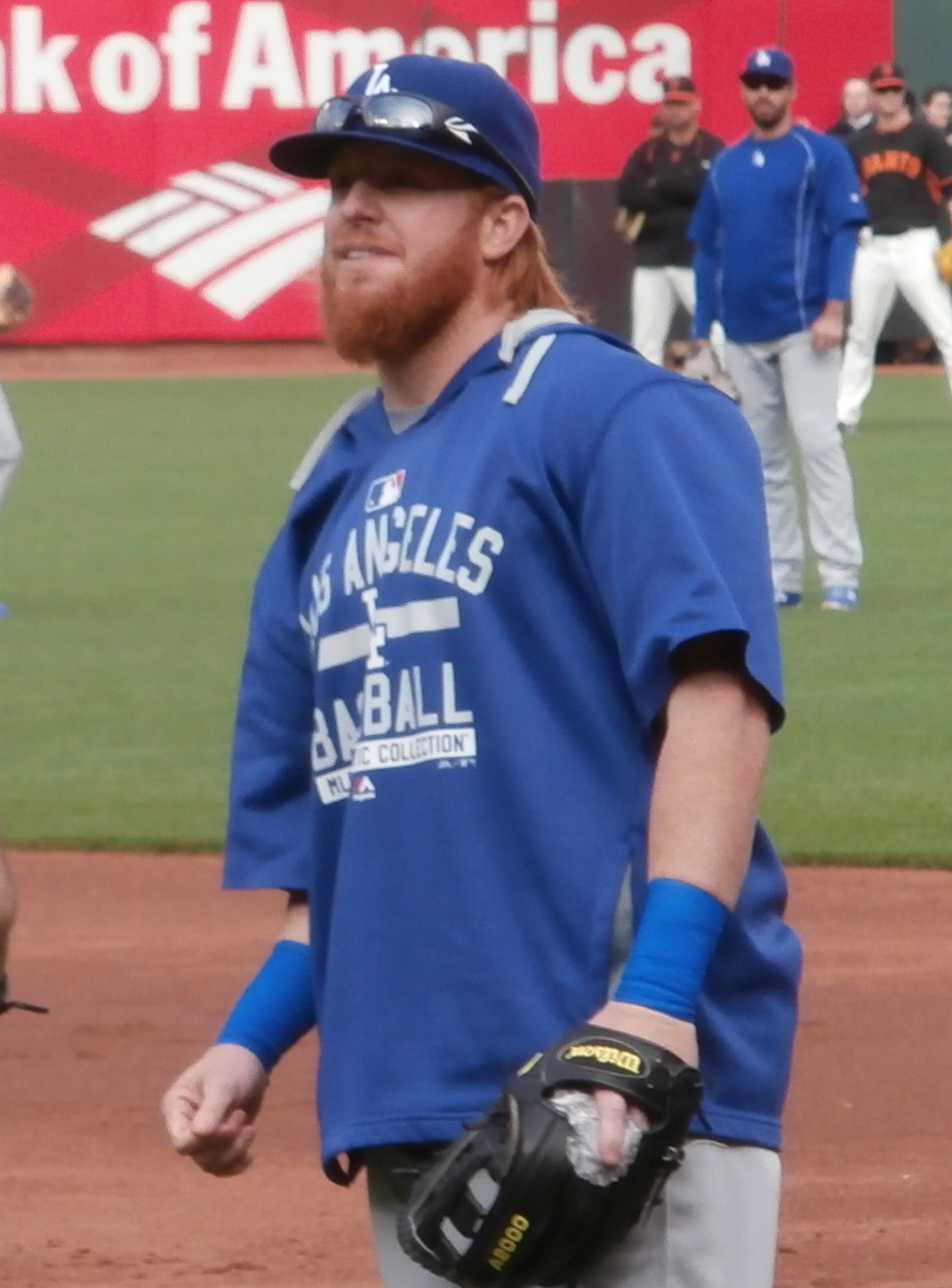
Justin Turner won the "Final Vote" and was selected to his first All-Star Game

Six Dodgers were selected to represent the National League at the 2017 Major League Baseball All-Star Game on July 11 at Marlins Park in Miami: Clayton Kershaw, Alex Wood, Kenley Jansen, Corey Seager, Justin Turner, and Cody Bellinger. Bellinger also was selected to participate in the Home Run Derby, where he lost in the semi-finals to the eventual champion Aaron Judge.

The Dodgers began the second half of the season with a five-game road trip, starting with a three-game weekend series against the Miami Marlins on July 14. Yasiel Puig hit two home runs, including the go-ahead three-run homer in the top of the ninth, as the Dodgers won 6–4. In the following game, Bellinger became the first Dodgers rookie to hit for the cycle and Wood pitched six shutout innings to become the first pitcher in franchise history to win his first 11 decisions as the Dodgers won the game 7–1. The Dodgers finished off their third straight series sweep with a 3–2 win over the Marlins. Rich Hill struck out nine while giving up one run on five hits in five innings and Justin Turner homered in the win. After an off-day, the Dodgers began a brief two game interleague series against the Chicago White Sox at Guaranteed Rate Field. Kershaw pitched seven scoreless innings with seven strikeouts and Bellinger's RBI single in the first inning accounted for the only run in the 1–0 victory. It was the Dodgers 10th consecutive victory and they were in the midst of a 30–4 run, the franchise best since 1899. In the second game, Kenta Maeda allowed one run in five innings while the Dodgers hit four home runs (two by Kike Hernández) en route to a rain shortened 9–1 win. Corey Seager hit his 44th career home run, the most by a shortstop in Los Angeles Dodger history.

The Dodgers returned home on July 20 to begin a four-game series against the Atlanta Braves. In the opener, Brandon McCarthy allowed six runs on nine hits in only four innings as the Dodgers 11 game win streak was snapped with a 6–3 loss. In the following game, Alex Wood had his worst start of the season, allowing seven earned runs in only 4 2/3 innings, as he suffered his first loss in the Braves 12–3 win. Rich Hill struck out eight in 6 1/3 innings and the Dodgers hit three home runs as they won the next game, 6–2. It was the 45th consecutive win for the Dodgers in a game in which they held a lead of any size, a major league record. On July 23, Kershaw left the game after two innings because of lower back tightness and Kenley Jansen blew his first save of the season when Matt Adams hit a three-run homer off him in the ninth. However, a walk-off hit by Logan Forsythe in the 10th gave them a 5–4 win and a series split. After learning that Kershaw would be lost for over a month with a back injury, the Dodgers welcomed the Minnesota Twins to Dodger Stadium for a three-game interleague series. Cody Bellinger hit a three-run home run in the bottom of the eighth inning to lead the Dodgers to a 6–4 comeback victory. They picked up their 70th win of the season the following day with a 6–2 victory over the Twins. Chris Taylor had two doubles and three RBIs in the game. In the next game, Brock Stewart made his first start of the season and gave up five unearned runs in 3 2/3 innings but the Dodgers battled back and eventually won 6–5 on a walk-off hit by Justin Turner to complete the sweep of the Twins. The victory moved the Dodgers 40 games over .500 for the first time since the end of the 1974 season. After an off day, the Dodgers would conclude the homestand with a three-game weekend series against the San Francisco Giants. Corey Seager homered twice, including the go-ahead 2-run home run, as the Dodgers won the series opener 6–4. Rich Hill allowed only two hits and one run in 5 2/3 innings in the second game of the series and Bellinger drove in the Dodgers only two runs in a 2–1 victory. The Dodgers finished up the homestand and the month with a 3–2 extra innings victory over the Giants. Kyle Farmer, in his first major league at-bat, drove in two runs on a walk-off double in the 11th to give the Dodgers the win. They finished with a 20–3 record in the month of July. The .870 win percentage was the highest posted in a month by a Major League team since the 1936 New York Giants and third highest since 1913.

=== August ===
The Dodgers began August with a nine-game roadtrip, starting in Atlanta at SunTrust Park. They beat the Braves 3–2 behind seven scoreless innings by Kenta Maeda. Cody Bellinger hit his 30th home run of the season in the next game but Tyler Flowers hit a pinch hit tie-breaking two-run homer off of Pedro Báez in the eighth inning as the Braves won 5–3 to snap the Dodgers winning streak. However, they won the series by beating the Braves 7–4 in the final game. Alex Wood allowed only one run in six innings and Chris Taylor had three hits including a home run. The Dodgers next began a three-game series at Citi Field against the New York Mets. Yu Darvish, who was acquired from the Texas Rangers at the trade deadline, made his Dodgers debut and struck out 10 in seven scoreless innings as the Dodgers hit three homers to win 6–0. Five different Dodgers homered in the next games as they beat the Mets 7–4. The Dodgers 50 game stretch of 43–7 was the best mark in the majors since the 1912 New York Giants. Hyun-jin Ryu struck out eight and allowed only one baserunner (a single by Travis d'Arnaud) in seven innings of work as the Dodgers completed the sweep of the Mets with an 8–0 victory. The Dodgers next traveled to Chase Field for a series against the second place Arizona Diamondbacks. Justin Turner hit two home runs to stake the Dodgers to an early lead, but a grand slam homer by Jake Lamb off reliever Tony Watson in the seventh inning gave the Diamondbacks a come from behind 6–3 win. The Dodgers won the second game of the series, 3–2, to become the sixth team since 1913 to hit the 80 win mark in its first 113 games. They won the next game as well, to win the series, 8–6. Darvish allowed two runs on five hits in five innings with ten strikeouts and Kenley Jansen became the first Dodger player with four seasons of at least 30 saves.

The Dodgers returned home on August 11 to start a three-game weekend series with the San Diego Padres. In the opener, the Padres hit three home runs, two of which were by Manuel Margot, and beat the Dodgers 4–3. The Dodgers came from behind to win the next game, 6–3. Corey Seager drove in three runs on a single in the sixth to pull them ahead and Cody Bellinger hit his 34th home run of the season. The Dodgers became the fastest National League team to reach 82 victories in a season since the 1944 Cardinals. They then took the final game of the series, 6–4, to win their 19th straight series. Justin Turner homered twice in the win. On August 15, the Dodgers scored five runs in the eighth inning to beat the Chicago White Sox 6–1 in the opener of a short two-game series. With the win the Dodgers moved to 50 games over .500 for the fourth time in franchise history and the first time since 1953. The Dodgers closed out the homestand with a 5–4 win over the White Sox. They rallied from two runs down in the ninth to win it on a walk-off hit by Yasiel Puig.

The Dodgers next traveled to Comerica Park for a series against the Detroit Tigers. They hit six doubles, including two by Chris Taylor for an 8–5 win. The Dodgers tied a major league record the next day, with their 13th consecutive interleague win, 3–0 over the Tigers. The 2004 Devil Rays and 2006 Red Sox had also won 13 in a row. However, that streak came to an end the next day, with a 6–1 loss in the series finale. Curtis Granderson, whom the Dodgers had acquired from the Mets a couple of days before, hit a solo homer for the Dodgers only run but a four-run sixth, sparked by a Justin Upton homer did them in. They traveled to PNC Park the next day for a four-game series against the Pittsburgh Pirates. Puig hit a home run in the 12th inning to give the Dodgers a 6–5 win. Granderson hit a grand slam homer earlier in the game, and became the first player in MLB history to hit two grand slams in the same week for two different organizations. The following day, spot starter Brock Stewart struggled, allowing five runs in the third inning without recording an out but the Dodgers bullpen prevented more damage and the offense picked up the clack. Chris Taylor had three hits and three RBI as they came back to win 8–5. In the next game, Rich Hill took a perfect game into the ninth inning only to have it broken up by an error on Logan Forsythe. With the Dodgers offense unable to score, he remained in the game for the 10th and allowed his first hit, a leadoff homer by Josh Harrison to lose the game 1–0. Granderson hit his third homer of the week in the next game, and Yasmani Grandal and Adrián González hit back-to-back homers in the eighth as they took the final game of the series, 5–2. They became the first Dodgers team ever and the first in the majors since the 2001 Mariners to win their 90th game within their first 126 games.

The Dodgers returned home on August 25 for a three-game series against the Milwaukee Brewers on Players Weekend. Kenta Maeda allowed only one hit in six innings with seven strikeouts. Forsythe and Puig homered and the Dodgers won 3–1. In the next game, Zach Davies shut out the Dodgers over seven innings with seven strikeouts and the bullpen finished the job as the Brewers won 3–0 with a two-run homer by Orlando Arcia being the main offense. The Brewers took the next game as well, 3–2, handing the Dodgers their first series defeat since June 5–7.

The Dodgers next traveled back to Chase Field for another road series with the Diamondbacks. Rich Hill struggled, allowing five runs in the first inning and only lasting 3 2/3 innings in the game. The offense battled back but they lost 7–6. In the following game, the Diamondbacks jumped all over Hyun-jin Ryu, who allowed six runs on eight hits, including three home runs, in four innings. The Dodgers dropped their season high fourth straight game, 6–4. This was the first time the Dodgers had lost two series in a row since early April. They ended the month of August with an 8–1 loss, the first time they had been swept in a series all season.

=== September ===
The Dodgers began September with a four-game series against the San Diego Padres at Petco Park. Clayton Kershaw returned from the disabled list and allowed only two hits in six innings with seven strikeouts. Padres pitcher Dinelson Lamet was also good, striking out 10 in six innings but the Dodgers managed to score a run in the sixth en route to a 1–0 victory to snap the longest losing streak of the season. The Dodgers played a double-header against the Padres on September 2, making up the game that was rained out on May 7. In the first game, the Dodgers fell behind early, tied the game on Justin Turner's two-run homer in the top of the ninth and then lost the game, 6–5, on a walk-off homer by Yangervis Solarte. Yu Darvish pitched poorly in the next game, allowing five runs on eight hits in three innings and the Dodgers lost 5–2. In the final game of the road trip, Cody Bellinger hit his 36th home run of the season, breaking Mike Piazza's franchise rookie record. The game however, ended in another loss, 6–4.

The Dodgers returned home on September 4 to play the Arizona Diamondbacks. J. D. Martinez tied a major league record by hitting four home runs in the game and Robbie Ray struck out 14 in 7 2/3 innings as the Diamondbacks routed the Dodgers 13–0. It was the Dodgers worst shutout loss since the 2004 season. In the next game, Hyun-jin Ryu and Zack Greinke both pitched well and the game went to extra innings tied at one. However, Pedro Báez walked the first two batters he faced in the 10th and two runs scored on a Justin Turner throwing error giving the Diamondbacks their 12th straight win, 3–1. In the final game of the series, Kenta Maeda struck out eight in five innings while allowing only one run, but the Diamondbacks scored a couple of runs off the bullpen and it was enough to sweep the Dodgers for the second straight series, 3–1. It was the Dodgers first six-game losing streak of the season and their 11th loss in their last 12 games. The Colorado Rockies came to town for the next series and in the opener got to Kershaw early, as he allowed a three-run homer to Nolan Arenado in the first inning en route to a 9–1 shellacking. It was the Dodgers first seven-game losing streak since May of the 2013 season. The Dodgers jumped out to a 4–1 lead in the next game but the Rockies scored four in the fifth off of Yu Darvish and won the game 5–4. The Dodgers lost their ninth straight game on September 9, when they fell to the Rockies, 6–5. It was their longest losing streak since the 1992 season. Andre Ethier homered in the game for the Dodgers, his first home run in almost one year. The homestand ended with an 8–1 loss. Mark Reynolds hit a grand slam in the eighth inning to put the game out of reach. It was the first time the Dodgers had been swept at home in two years and the first time they had lost every game of a homestand of five or more games since they moved to Los Angeles.

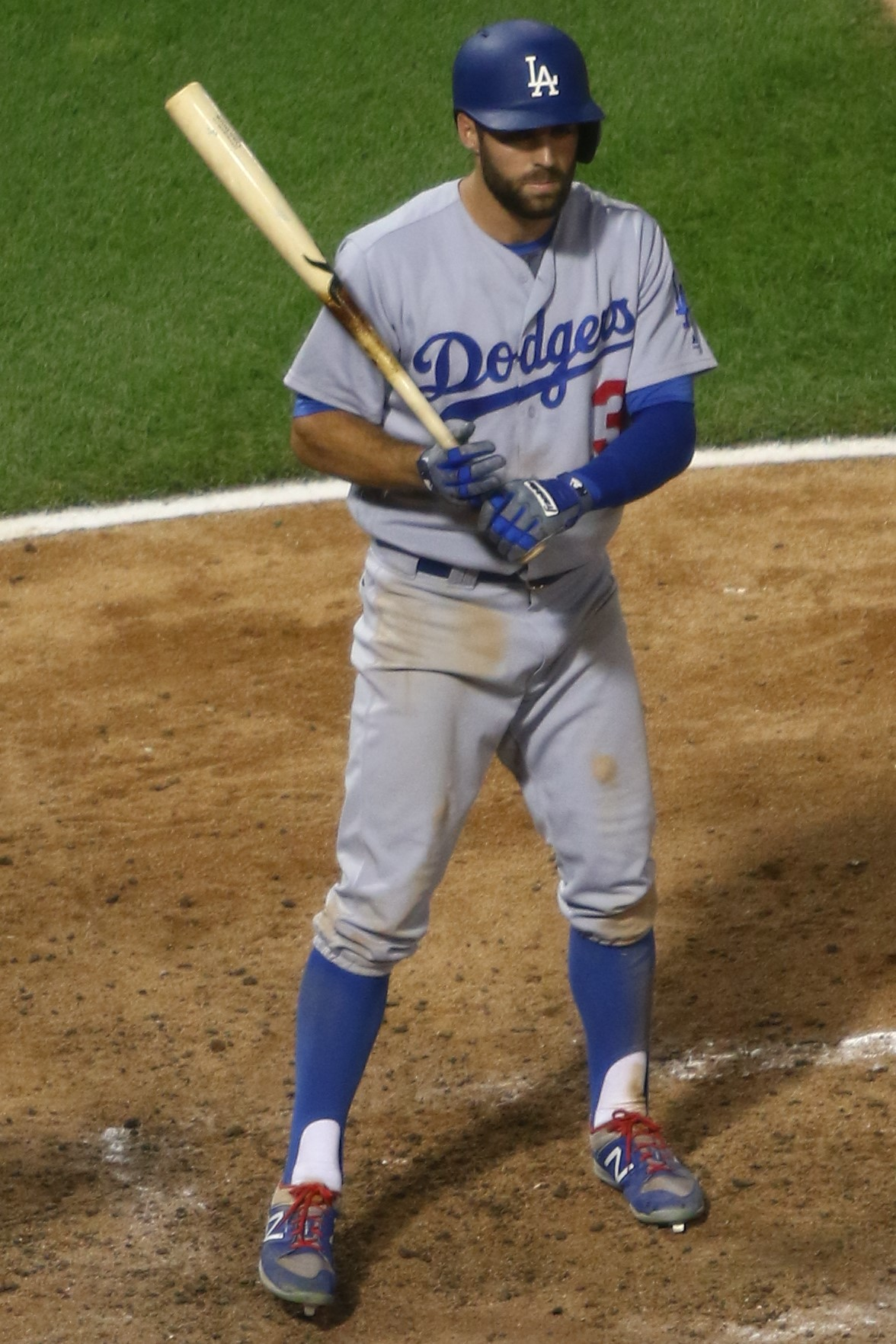
Chris Taylor hit an inside-the-park homer against the Phillies on September 18

The Dodgers went back on the road for a series against the San Francisco Giants at AT&T Park on September 11. The opener was delayed 3 1/2 hours by rain but the result was the same, as the Dodgers lost their 11th straight game, 8–6. In the next game, Kershaw allowed two runs (one earned) on eight hits in six innings with six strikeouts and the Dodgers snapped their longest losing streak since 1944 with a 5–3 win over the Giants. With the win, the Dodgers clinched a spot in the postseason. Yu Darvish got the start in the following game and he shutout the Giants on three hits over seven innings. Bellinger hit a two-run homer and the Dodgers won the game 4–1 for their first series victory since August 21–24. On September 15, they traveled to Nationals Park for a three-game weekend series against the National League East champion Washington Nationals. In the opener, Alex Wood struck out eight and only allowed three hits in six shutout innings and the Dodgers homered three times, including a three-run blast by Corey Seager. They won the game 7–0. Rich Hill struck out seven in five innings while only allowing one hit in the following game and Bellinger hit his 38th home run of the season, tying the National League rookie record previously set by Wally Berger (1930) and Frank Robinson (1956). The Dodgers won 3–2. In the final game of the series, Ryan Zimmerman hit a three-run home run in the sixth inning off of reliever Ross Stripling and the Nationals went ahead to a 7–1 win to avoid the sweep. The Dodgers next traveled to Citizens Bank Park for a four-game mid-week series against the team with the second worst record in the National League, the Philadelphia Phillies. They jumped out to a 2–0 lead in the first inning after an inside-the-park homer by Chris Taylor and a normal homer by Justin Turner. However, Aaron Altherr hit a grand slam off of Kershaw in the sixth to lead the Phillies to a 4–3 upset win. In the following game, the Phillies scored four runs in the seventh off reliever Pedro Báez and beat the Dodgers again, 6–2. The Dodgers bullpen faltered again in the next game, as they lost 7–5. They wrapped up the road trip on September 21 with a 5–4 comeback victory over the Phillies to avoid being swept.

On September 22, they returned home to play a series with the Giants. Cody Bellinger hit his 39th homer, a three-run blast, to set a new NL rookie record, Rich Hill struck out nine in six innings, Kenley Jansen picked up his 40th save and the Dodgers beat the Giants 4–2. The win clinched the Dodgers fifth straight National League West title, a run only surpassed by the New York Yankees (who won nine from 1998 to 2006) and the Atlanta Braves (who won 11 from 1995 to 2005). The Dodgers offense couldn't get anything going against Madison Bumgarner in the next game and they lost 2–1. The Dodgers finished off the series with a 3–1 victory over the Giants. Kershaw struck out six while allowing only one run in eight innings and Yasmani Grandal hit a two-run homer in the win. The Dodgers began a three-game series with the San Diego Padres on September 25. Yu Darvish struck out nine with only two hits in seven innings as the Dodgers won 9–3 for their 100th win of the season. It was the first time the Dodgers had reached 100 victories since the 1974 season and it was their 55th home win, tying a Dodger Stadium record previously set in 1980 and 2015. The Dodgers hit three home runs en route to a 9–2 win the next game as they clinched home field throughout the National League playoffs and broke the LA record for home wins with their 56th. They added one more win the next night, when they finished off their last home series of the regular season with a 10–0 win over the Padres. Rich Hill struck out 10 in seven innings and the Dodgers won their 102nd game, setting a new record for the Los Angeles franchise.

The Dodgers concluded the regular season with a three-game road trip to Coors Field to play the Rockies. Hyun-jin Ryu allowed five runs, including three home runs in only two innings as the Rockies won big, 9–1. In the next game, Yasiel Puig hit a two-run homer as the Dodgers won 5–3 to clinch the best record in baseball, for the first time in 43 years. The Dodgers finished off the regular season with a 6–3 win over the Rockies. They tied the 1942 Brooklyn Dodgers for the second most wins in franchise history with 104, their highest win total since moving to Los Angeles.

=== Game log ===
2017 Game Log: (104–58)
April (14–12)

#	Date	Opponent	Score	Win	Loss	Save	Attendance	Record
1	April 3	Padres	**W** 14–3	**Kershaw** (1–0)	Chacín (0–1)	—	53,701	1–0
2	April 4	Padres	L 0–4	Richard (1–0)	**Maeda** (0–1)	—	42,196	1–1
3	April 5	Padres	**W** 3–1	**Hill** (1–0)	Cahill (0–1)	**Jansen** (1)	38,373	2–1
4	April 6	Padres	**W** 10–2	**McCarthy** (1–0)	Weaver (0–1)	—	36,501	3–1
5	April 7	@ Rockies	L 1–2	Freeland (1–0)	**Ryu** (0–1)	McGee (1)	39,169	3–2
6	April 8	@ Rockies	L 2–4	Dunn (2–0)	**Kershaw** (1–1)	Holland (4)	48,012	3–3
7	April 9	@ Rockies	**W** 10–6	**Maeda** (1–1)	Anderson (1–1)	—	33,529	4–3
8	April 10	@ Cubs	L 2–3	Davis (1–0)	**Romo** (0–1)	—	41,166	4–4
9	April 12	@ Cubs	**W** 2–0	**McCarthy** (2–0)	Lackey (1–1)	**Jansen** (2)	40,844	5–4
10	April 13	@ Cubs	L 0–4	Anderson (1–0)	**Ryu** (0–2)	—	38,379	5–5
11	April 14	Diamondbacks	**W** 7–1	**Kershaw** (2–1)	Greinke (1–1)	—	49,438	6–5
12	April 15	Diamondbacks	**W** 8–4	**Wood** (1–0)	Corbin (1–2)	**Jansen** (3)	48,070	7–5
13	April 16	Diamondbacks	L 1–3	Walker (2–1)	**Hill** (1–1)	Rodney (4)	39,822	7–6
14	April 17	Diamondbacks	L 2–4	Hoover (1–0)	**Hatcher** (0–1)	Rodney (5)	35,448	7–7
15	April 18	Rockies	L 3–4	Rusin (2–0)	**Ryu** (0–3)	Holland (8)	37,960	7–8
16	April 19	Rockies	**W** 4–2	**Kershaw** (3–1)	Anderson (1–3)	**Jansen** (4)	45,474	8–8
17	April 21	@ Diamondbacks	L 5–13	Bradley (1–0)	**Stripling** (0–1)	—	27,018	8–9
18	April 22	@ Diamondbacks	L 5–11	Ray (2–0)	**Maeda** (1–2)	—	36,294	8–10
19	April 23	@ Diamondbacks	**W** 6–2	**McCarthy** (3–0)	Miller (2–2)	—	28,704	9–10
20	April 24	@ Giants	L 1–2	Cain (2–0)	**Ryu** (0–4)	Melancon (4)	41,399	9–11
21	April 25	@ Giants	**W** 2–1	**Kershaw** (4–1)	Blach (0–1)	**Jansen** (5)	41,329	10–11
22	April 26	@ Giants	L 3–4 (10)	Law (2–0)	**Stripling** (0–2)	—	41,573	10–12
23	April 27	@ Giants	**W** 5–1 (10)	**Jansen** (1–0)	Gearrin (0–1)	—	41,580	11–12
24	April 28	Phillies	**W** 5–3	**Maeda** (2–2)	Eickhoff (0–2)	**Jansen** (6)	46,729	12–12
25	April 29	Phillies	**W** 6–5	**Dayton** (1–0)	Neris (0–1)	—	53,110	13–12
26	April 30	Phillies	**W** 5–3	**Ryu** (1–4)	Pivetta (0–1)	**Jansen** (7)	48,961	14–12

May (19–9)

#	Date	Opponent	Score	Win	Loss	Save	Attendance	Record
27	May 1	Giants	L 3–4	Cueto (4–1)	**Kershaw** (4–2)	Law (1)	44,606	14–13
28	May 2	Giants	**W** 13–5	**Wood** (2–0)	Moore (1–4)	—	43,471	15–13
29	May 3	Giants	L 1–4 (11)	Okert (1–0)	**Dayton** (1–1)	Melancon (6)	50,215	15–14
30	May 5	@ Padres	**W** 8–2	**Romo** (1–1)	Torres (1–2)	**Fields** (1)	34,320	16–14
31	May 6	@ Padres	**W** 10–2	**Kershaw** (5–2)	Richard (2–4)	—	36,337	17–14
–	May 7	@ Padres	Postponed (rain) Rescheduled for September 2					
32	May 8	Pirates	**W** 12–1	**Wood** (3–0)	Williams (1–2)	—	37,314	18–14
33	May 9	Pirates	**W** 4–3 (10)	**Jansen** (2–0)	Hudson (0–2)	—	47,720	19–14
34	May 10	Pirates	**W** 5–2	**Maeda** (3–2)	Kuhl (1–3)	—	40,719	20–14
35	May 11	@ Rockies	L 7–10	Hoffman (1–0)	**Ryu** (1–5)	Holland (15)	27,265	20–15
36	May 12	@ Rockies	**W** 6–2	**Kershaw** (6–2)	Chatwood (3–5)	—	40,146	21–15
37	May 13	@ Rockies	**W** 4–0	**Wood** (4–0)	Anderson (2–4)	—	43,534	22–15
38	May 14	@ Rockies	L 6–9	Senzatela (6–1)	**Urías** (0–1)	Holland (16)	41,051	22–16
39	May 15	@ Giants	L 4–8	Cain (3–1)	**McCarthy** (3–1)	—	41,397	22–17
40	May 16	@ Giants	L 1–2	Blach (1–2)	**Avilán** (0–1)	Law (4)	41,366	22–18
41	May 17	@ Giants	**W** 6–1	**Kershaw** (7–2)	Cueto (4–3)	—	41,588	23–18
42	May 18	Marlins	**W** 7–2	**Ryu** (2–5)	Vólquez (0–6)	**Jansen** (8)	41,717	24–18
43	May 19	Marlins	**W** 7–2	**Wood** (5–0)	Nicolino (0–1)	—	45,034	25–18
44	May 20	Marlins	L 6–10	Straily (2–3)	**Urías** (0–2)	—	52,850	25–19
45	May 21	Marlins	**W** 6–3	**McCarthy** (4–1)	Worley (0–1)	—	44,646	26–19
46	May 23	Cardinals	**W** 2–1 (13)	**Fields** (1–0)	Broxton (0 –1)	—	41,248	27–19
47	May 24	Cardinals	L 1–6	Leake (5–2)	**Hill** (1–2)	—	40,653	27–20
48	May 25	Cardinals	**W** 7–3	**Maeda** (4–2)	Wacha (2–2)	**Ryu** (1)	47,427	28–20
49	May 26	Cubs	**W** 4–0	**Wood** (6–0)	Arrieta (5–4)	—	45,017	29–20
50	May 27	Cubs	**W** 5–0	**McCarthy** (5–1)	Lackey (4–5)	**Stripling** (1)	48,322	30–20
51	May 28	Cubs	**W** 9–4	**Fields** (2–0)	Lester (3–3)	—	47,732	31–20
52	May 29	@ Cardinals	**W** 5–1	**Hill** (2–2)	Leake (5–3)	—	46,241	32–20
53	May 30	@ Cardinals	**W** 9–4	**Morrow** (1–0)	Wacha (2–3)	—	38,466	33–20
54	May 31	@ Cardinals	L 1–2	Martínez (4–4)	**Stripling** (0–3)	Oh (12)	40,304	33–21

June (21–7)

#	Date	Opponent	Score	Win	Loss	Save	Attendance	Record
55	June 1	@ Cardinals	L 0–2	Wainwright (6–3)	**McCarthy** (5–2)	Oh (13)	40,477	33–22
56	June 2	@ Brewers	**W** 2–1 (12)	**Jansen** (3–0)	Feliz (1–5)	—	30,140	34–22
57	June 3	@ Brewers	**W** 10–8	**Morrow** (2–0)	Torres (2–4)	**Jansen** (9)	34,354	35–22
58	June 4	@ Brewers	L 0–3	Davies (6–3)	**Maeda** (4–3)	Knebel (5)	30,330	35–23
59	June 5	Nationals	L 2–4	González (5–1)	**Ryu** (2–6)	Pérez (1)	46,289	35–24
60	June 6	Nationals	L 1–2	Scherzer (7–3)	**McCarthy** (5–3)	Glover (8)	44,250	35–25
61	June 7	Nationals	**W** 2–1	**Kershaw** (8–2)	Strasburg (7–2)	**Jansen** (10)	43,230	36–25
62	June 9	Reds	**W** 7–2	**Hill** (3–2)	Garrett (3–5)	**Maeda** (1)	44,036	37–25
63	June 10	Reds	**W** 5–4	**Jansen** (4–0)	Storen (1–3)	—	43,439	38–25
64	June 11	Reds	**W** 9–7	**Avilán** (1–1)	Iglesias (2–1)	**Jansen** (11)	42,674	39–25
65	June 13	@ Indians	**W** 7–5	**Kershaw** (9–2)	Miller (3–1)	**Jansen** (12)	22,171	40–25
66	June 14	@ Indians	**W** 6–4	**Fields** (3–0)	Miller (3–2)	**Jansen** (13)	21,051	41–25
67	June 15	@ Indians	L 5–12	Tomlin (4–8)	**Hill** (3–3)	—	23,339	41–26
68	June 16	@ Reds	**W** 3–1	**Wood** (7–0)	Adleman (4–3)	**Jansen** (14)	35,613	42–26
69	June 17	@ Reds	**W** 10–2	**Ryu** (3–6)	Wojciechowski (1–1)	—	42,431	43–26
70	June 18	@ Reds	**W** 8–7	**Maeda** (5–3)	Arroyo (3–6)	**Jansen** (15)	27,316	44–26
71	June 19	Mets	**W** 10–6	**Kershaw** (10–2)	Wheeler (3–5)	—	43,266	45–26
72	June 20	Mets	**W** 12–0	**McCarthy** (6–3)	Gsellman (5–5)	**Stewart** (1)	47,715	46–26
73	June 21	Mets	**W** 8–2	**Hill** (4–3)	Pill (0–3)	—	42,330	47–26
74	June 22	Mets	**W** 6–3	**Báez** (1–0)	Sewald (0–2)	**Jansen** (16)	45,967	48–26
75	June 23	Rockies	**W** 6–1	**Wood** (8–0)	Freeland (8–5)	—	43.787	49–26
76	June 24	Rockies	**W** 4–0	**Kershaw** (11–2)	Chatwood (6–8)	—	50,403	50–26
77	June 25	Rockies	**W** 12–6	**Báez** (2–0)	Ottavino (1–2)	**Jansen** (17)	41,605	51–26
78	June 26	Angels	L 0–4	Nolasco (3–9)	**Hill** (4–4)	—	43,126	51–27
79	June 27	Angels	**W** 4–0	**Maeda** (6–3)	Chavez (5–8)	—	47,245	52–27
80	June 28	@ Angels	L 2–3	Bedrosian (2–0)	**Báez** (2–1)	—	44,669	52–28
81	June 29	@ Angels	**W** 6–2	**Kershaw** (12–2)	Ramírez (7–6)	**Jansen** (18)	44,807	53–28
82	June 30	@ Padres	**W** 10–4	**Wood** (9–0)	Richard (5–8)	—	39,254	54–28

July (20–3)

#	Date	Opponent	Score	Win	Loss	Save	Attendance	Record
83	July 1	@ Padres	**W** 8–0	**Hill** (5–4)	Overton (0–1)	—	40,683	55–28
84	July 2	@ Padres	L 3–5	Chacín (7–7)	**Maeda** (6–4)	Maurer (16)	41,604	55–29
85	July 4	Diamondbacks	**W** 4–3	**Kershaw** (13–2)	Corbin (6–8)	**Jansen** (19)	53,159	56–29
86	July 5	Diamondbacks	**W** 1–0	**Wood** (10–0)	Godley (3–3)	**Jansen** (20)	40,997	57–29
87	July 6	Diamondbacks	**W** 5–4	**Fields** (4–0)	Rodney (3–3)	—	41,999	58–29
88	July 7	Royals	**W** 4–1	**Maeda** (7–4)	Hammel (4–8)	**Jansen** (21)	48,017	59–29
89	July 8	Royals	**W** 5–4 (10)	**Stripling** (1–3)	Alexander (1–3)	—	45,225	60–29
90	July 9	Royals	**W** 5–2	**Kershaw** (14–2)	Duffy (5–5)	—	41,524	61–29
–	July 11	88th All-Star Game	National League vs. American League (Marlins Park, Miami, Florida)					
91	July 14	@ Marlins	**W** 6–4	**Fields** (5–0)	Ramos (2–4)	**Jansen** (22)	21,858	62–29
92	July 15	@ Marlins	**W** 7–1	**Wood** (11–0)	Ureña (7–4)	—	22,609	63–29
93	July 16	@ Marlins	**W** 3–2	**Hill** (6–4)	O'Grady (1–1)	**Jansen** (23)	22,119	64–29
94	July 18	@ White Sox	**W** 1–0	**Kershaw** (15–2)	González (4–9)	**Jansen** (24)	23,088	65–29
95	July 19	@ White Sox	**W** 9–1 (7)	**Maeda** (8–4)	Rodon (1–3)	—	24,907	66–29
96	July 20	Braves	L 3–6	Foltynewicz (8–5)	**McCarthy** (6–4)	Johnson (22)	45,636	66–30
97	July 21	Braves	L 3–12	García (4–7)	**Wood** (11–1)	—	46,083	66–31
98	July 22	Braves	**W** 6–2	**Hill** (7–4)	Teherán (7–8)	—	47,497	67–31
99	July 23	Braves	**W** 5–4 (10)	**Morrow** (3–0)	Johnson (6–2)	—	44,701	68–31
100	July 24	Twins	**W** 6–4	**Paredes** (1–0)	Rogers (5–2)	**Jansen** (25)	47,754	69–31
101	July 25	Twins	**W** 6–2	**Maeda** (9–4)	Berríos (9–4)	**Ravin** (1)	44,403	70–31
102	July 26	Twins	**W** 6–5	**Jansen** (5–0)	Kintzler (2–2)	—	50,941	71–31
103	July 28	Giants	**W** 6–4	**Wood** (12–1)	Kontos (0–5)	**Jansen** (26)	51.426	72–31
104	July 29	Giants	**W** 2–1	**Hill** (8–4)	Blach (6–7)	**Jansen** (27)	47,792	73–31
105	July 30	Giants	**W** 3–2 (11)	**Báez** (3–1)	Suárez (0–1)	—	53,495	74–31

August (17–10)

#	Date	Opponent	Score	Win	Loss	Save	Attendance	Record
106	August 1	@ Braves	**W** 3–2	**Maeda** (10–4)	Sims (0–1)	**Jansen** (28)	32,174	75–31
107	August 2	@ Braves	L 3–5	Brothers (2–2)	**Báez** (3–2)	Vizcaíno (3)	28,107	75–32
108	August 3	@ Braves	**W** 7–4	**Wood** (13–1)	Newcomb (1–6)	—	29,680	76–32
109	August 4	@ Mets	**W** 6–0	**Darvish** (7–9)	deGrom (12–5)	—	41,187	77–32
110	August 5	@ Mets	**W** 7–4	**Morrow** (4–0)	Sewald (0–4)	—	40,060	78–32
111	August 6	@ Mets	**W** 8–0	**Ryu** (4–6)	Matz (2–5)	—	27,077	79–32
112	August 8	@ Diamondbacks	L 3–6	Hernandez (2–0)	**Watson** (5–4)	Rodney (26)	24,810	79–33
113	August 9	@ Diamondbacks	**W** 3–2	**Wood** (14–1)	Greinke (13–5)	**Jansen** (29)	22,670	80–33
114	August 10	@ Diamondbacks	**W** 8–6	**Darvish** (8–9)	Banda (1–2)	**Jansen** (30)	31,396	81–33
115	August 11	Padres	L 3–4	Torres (6–3)	**Stripling** (1–4)	Hand (9)	52,898	81–34
116	August 12	Padres	**W** 6–3	**Watson** (6–4)	Stammen (0–2)	**Jansen** (31)	53,230	82–34
117	August 13	Padres	**W** 6–4	**Maeda** (11–4)	Perdomo (6–7)	**Jansen** (32)	46,128	83–34
118	August 15	White Sox	**W** 6–1	**Morrow** (5–0)	Minaya (1–1)	—	46,385	84–34
119	August 16	White Sox	**W** 5–4	**Stripling** (2–4)	Petricka (1–1)	—	52,413	85–34
120	August 18	@ Tigers	**W** 8–5	**Hill** (9–4)	Zimmermann (7–10)	—	32,801	86–34
121	August 19	@ Tigers	**W** 3–0	**Stripling** (3–4)	Fulmer (10–11)	**Jansen** (33)	37,182	87–34
122	August 20	@ Tigers	L 1–6	Verlander (9–8)	**Maeda** (11–5)	—	30,901	87–35
123	August 21	@ Pirates	**W** 6–5 (12)	**Avilán** (2–1)	Neverauskas (1–1)	**Stripling** (2)	19,094	88–35
124	August 22	@ Pirates	**W** 8–5	**Watson** (7–4)	Barbato (0–1)	**Jansen** (34)	17,288	89–35
125	August 23	@ Pirates	L 0–1 (10)	Nicasio (2–5)	**Hill** (9–5)	—	19,859	89–36
126	August 24	@ Pirates	**W** 5–2	**Ryu** (5–6)	Kuhl (6–9)	**Morrow** (1)	22,115	90–36
127	August 25	Brewers	**W** 3–1	**Maeda** (12–5)	Anderson (7–3)	**Jansen** (35)	52,455	91–36
128	August 26	Brewers	L 0–3	Davies (15–7)	**Ravin** (0–1)	Knebel (28)	52,345	91–37
129	August 27	Brewers	L 2–3	Nelson (10–6)	**Darvish** (8–10)	Knebel (29)	51,355	91–38
130	August 29	@ Diamondbacks	L 6–7	Godley (6–7)	**Hill** (9–6)	Rodney (33)	25,219	91–39
131	August 30	@ Diamondbacks	L 4–6	Ray (11–5)	**Ryu** (5–7)	Rodney (34)	23,321	91–40
132	August 31	@ Diamondbacks	L 1–8	Greinke (16–6)	**Maeda** (12–6)	—	19,882	91–41

September (12–17)

#	Date	Opponent	Score	Win	Loss	Save	Attendance	Record
133	September 1	@ Padres	**W** 1–0	**Kershaw** (16–2)	Lamet (7–6)	**Jansen** (36)	36,767	92–41
134	September 2	@ Padres	L 5–6	Hand (3–4)	**Báez** (3–3)	—	39,140	92–42
135	September 2	@ Padres	L 2–7	Baumann (1–1)	**Darvish** (8–11)	—	42,130	92–43
136	September 3	@ Padres	L 4–6	Chacín (12–10)	**Wood** (14–2)	Hand (15)	33,949	92–44
137	September 4	Diamondbacks	L 0–13	Ray (12–5)	**Hill** (9–7)	—	47,192	92–45
138	September 5	Diamondbacks	L 1–3 (10)	Hernandez (3–0)	**Báez** (3–4)	Rodney (35)	47,039	92–46
139	September 6	Diamondbacks	L 1–3	Walker (9–7)	**Avilán** (2–2)	Rodney (36)	48,612	92–47
140	September 7	Rockies	L 1–9	Gray (7–4)	**Kershaw** (16–3)	—	51,492	92–48
141	September 8	Rockies	L 4–5	Rusin (5–0)	**Darvish** (8–12)	Holland (38)	53,632	92–49
142	September 9	Rockies	L 5–6	Bettis (1–2)	**Wood** (14–3)	Holland (39)	52,884	92–50
143	September 10	Rockies	L 1–8	Chatwood (7–12)	**Hill** (9–8)	—	50,161	92–51
144	September 11	@ Giants	L 6–8	Law (4–1)	**Báez** (3–5)	Dyson (13)	40,409	92–52
145	September 12	@ Giants	**W** 5–3	**Kershaw** (17–3)	Cueto (7–8)	**Jansen** (37)	38,727	93–52
146	September 13	@ Giants	**W** 4–1	**Darvish** (9–12)	Moore (5–14)	—	38,866	94–52
147	September 15	@ Nationals	**W** 7–0	**Wood** (15–3)	Jackson (5–6)	—	37,508	95–52
148	September 16	@ Nationals	**W** 3–2	**Hill** (10–8)	Cole (2–5)	**Jansen** (38)	39,387	96–52
149	September 17	@ Nationals	L 1–7	Strasburg (14–4)	**Stripling** (3–5)	—	29,155	96–53
150	September 18	@ Phillies	L 3–4	Pivetta (6–10)	**Kershaw** (17–4)	Neris (22)	16,690	96–54
151	September 19	@ Phillies	L 2–6	Nola (12–10)	**Báez** (3–6)	—	20,156	96–55
152	September 20	@ Phillies	L 5–7	García (2–4)	**Avilán** (2–3)	Neris (23)	20,175	96–56
153	September 21	@ Phillies	**W** 5–4	**Buehler** (1–0)	Pinto (1–2)	**Jansen** (39)	18,735	97–56
154	September 22	Giants	**W** 4–2	**Hill** (11–8)	Samardzija (9–15)	**Jansen** (40)	51,159	98–56
155	September 23	Giants	L 1–2	Bumgarner (4–9)	**Ryu** (5–8)	Dyson (14)	51,093	98–57
156	September 24	Giants	**W** 3–1	**Kershaw** (18–4)	Stratton (3–4)	**Morrow** (2)	46,774	99–57
157	September 25	Padres	**W** 9–3	**Darvish** (10–12)	Wood (3–4)	—	49,419	100–57
158	September 26	Padres	**W** 9–2	**Wood** (16–3)	Lamet (7–8)	—	47,432	101–57
159	September 27	Padres	**W** 10–0	**Hill** (12–8)	Richard (8–15)	—	47,273	102–57
160	September 29	@ Rockies	L 1–9	Bettis (2–4)	**Ryu** (5–9)	—	48,395	102–58
161	September 30	@ Rockies	**W** 5–3	**Morrow** (6–0)	Chatwood (8–15)	**Jansen** (41)	48,103	103–58

October (1–0)

#	Date	Opponent	Score	Win	Loss	Save	Attendance	Record
162	October 1	@ Rockies	**W** 6–3	**Maeda** (13–6)	Freeland (11–11)	**Fields** (2)	32,946	104–58

Legend: = Win = Loss = Postponement
Bold = Dodgers team member

== Postseason ==
=== Postseason Game log ===
2017 Postseason Game Log: (10–5)
National League Division Series (3–0)

#	Date	Opponent	Score	Win	Loss	Save	Attendance	Record
1	October 6	Diamondbacks	**W** 9–5	**Kershaw** (1–0)	Walker (0–1)	—	54,707	1–0
2	October 7	Diamondbacks	**W** 8–5	**Maeda** (1–0)	Ray (0–1)	**Jansen** (1)	54,726	2–0
3	October 9	@ Diamondbacks	**W** 3–1	**Darvish** (1–0)	Greinke (0–1)	**Jansen** (2)	48,641	3–0

National League Championship Series (4–1)

Game	Date	Opponent	Score	Win	Loss	Save	Attendance	Series
1	October 14	Cubs	**W** 5–2	**Maeda** (1–0)	Rondón (0–1)	**Jansen** (1)	54,289	1–0
2	October 15	Cubs	**W** 4–1	**Jansen** (1–0)	Duensing (0–1)	—	54,479	2–0
3	October 17	@ Cubs	**W** 6–1	**Darvish** (1–0)	Hendricks (0–1)	—	41,871	3–0
4	October 18	@ Cubs	L 2–3	Arrieta (1–0)	**Wood** (0–1)	Davis (1)	42,195	3–1
5	October 19	@ Cubs	**W** 11–1	**Kershaw** (1–0)	Quintana (0–1)	—	42,735	4–1

World Series (3–4)

Game	Date	Opponent	Score	Win	Loss	Save	Attendance	Series
1	October 24	Astros	**W** 3–1	**Kershaw** (1–0)	Keuchel (0–1)	**Jansen** (1)	54,253	1–0
2	October 25	Astros	L 6–7 (11)	Devenski (1–0)	**McCarthy** (0–1)	—	54,293	1–1
3	October 27	@ Astros	L 3–5	McCullers (1–0)	**Darvish** (0–1)	Peacock (1)	43,282	1–2
4	October 28	@ Astros	**W** 6–2	**Watson** (1–0)	Giles (0–1)	—	43,322	2–2
5	October 29	@ Astros	L 12–13 (10)	Musgrove (1–0)	**Jansen** (0–1)	—	43,300	2–3
6	October 31	Astros	**W** 3–1	**Watson** (2–0)	Verlander (0–1)	**Jansen** (2)	54,128	3–3
7	November 1	Astros	L 1–5	Morton (1–0)	**Darvish** (0–2)	—	54,124	3–4

Legend: = Win = Loss = Postponement
Bold = Dodgers team member

Playoff Rosters
National League Division Series

- Pitchers: 17 Brandon Morrow 18 Kenta Maeda 21 Yu Darvish 22 Clayton Kershaw 33 Tony Watson 44 Rich Hill 46 Josh Fields 52 Pedro Báez 54 Tony Cingrani 57 Alex Wood 68 Ross Stripling 74 Kenley Jansen
- Catchers: 9 Yasmani Grandal 15 Austin Barnes 65 Kyle Farmer
- Infielders: 5 Corey Seager 10 Justin Turner 11 Logan Forsythe 26 Chase Utley 35 Cody Bellinger
- Outfielders: 3 Chris Taylor 6 Curtis Granderson 14 Enrique Hernández 16 Andre Ethier 66 Yasiel Puig

National League Championship Series

- Pitchers: 17 Brandon Morrow 18 Kenta Maeda 21 Yu Darvish 22 Clayton Kershaw 33 Tony Watson 44 Rich Hill 46 Josh Fields 54 Tony Cingrani 57 Alex Wood 68 Ross Stripling 74 Kenley Jansen
- Catchers: 9 Yasmani Grandal 15 Austin Barnes 65 Kyle Farmer
- Infielders: 10 Justin Turner 11 Logan Forsythe 26 Chase Utley 35 Cody Bellinger 37 Charlie Culberson
- Outfielders: 3 Chris Taylor 6 Curtis Granderson 14 Enrique Hernández 16 Andre Ethier 31 Joc Pederson 66 Yasiel Puig

World Series

- Pitchers: 17 Brandon Morrow 18 Kenta Maeda 21 Yu Darvish 22 Clayton Kershaw 33 Tony Watson 38 Brandon McCarthy 44 Rich Hill 46 Josh Fields 54 Tony Cingrani 57 Alex Wood 68 Ross Stripling 74 Kenley Jansen
- Catchers: 9 Yasmani Grandal 15 Austin Barnes
- Infielders: 5 Corey Seager 10 Justin Turner 11 Logan Forsythe 26 Chase Utley 35 Cody Bellinger 37 Charlie Culberson
- Outfielders: 3 Chris Taylor 14 Enrique Hernández 16 Andre Ethier 31 Joc Pederson 66 Yasiel Puig

=== National League Division Series ===
The Dodgers, as the top seeded team in the National League, played the Arizona Diamondbacks in the Division Series. Clayton Kershaw started for the Dodgers in the first game and he struck out seven in 6 1/3 innings. He also allowed four solo homers, the first National League pitcher to ever do so in a playoff game. The Dodgers got to Diamondbacks starter Taijuan Walker early, scoring four runs off him in the first inning before recording an out, most of them on Justin Turner's three-run home run. Turner had five RBIs in the game, tying Pedro Guerrero (1981) and Davey Lopes (1978) for the Dodgers single game post-season record. Walker was replaced after the first inning by Zack Godley, who pitched five innings of relief while allowing three more runs to score. The Dodgers held on to win the game, 9–5.

In the second game, the Diamondbacks jumped on Rich Hill in the first inning with a two-run homer by Paul Goldschmidt. The Dodgers battled back against Robbie Ray, who battled control problems, with four walks, a hit batter and three wild pitches. Yasiel Puig had three hits and two RBI, Logan Forsythe had three hits in five at bats. The Dodgers won the game 8–5 with Kenley Jansen recording the last five outs to get the save.

In game three, at Chase Field, Yu Darvish struck out seven and allowed only two hits and one run (a solo homer by Daniel Descalso). Meanwhile, Zack Greinke labored through his five innings, walking five and giving up four hits and three runs (two on homers by Cody Bellinger and Austin Barnes). The bullpens kept the game there and the Dodgers won the game 3–1, completing the sweep of the Diamondbacks and making their third trip to the NLCS in five years.

=== National League Championship Series ===
The Dodgers hosted the Chicago Cubs in the NLCS. This was the second straight year these two teams faced each other in the series. The Dodgers offense took a big hit before the series even began when All-Star shortstop Corey Seager was left off the NLCS roster as a result of a back injury suffered in game three of the division series.

In the opener of the series, the Cubs took the early lead when Albert Almora hit a two-run homer off of Clayton Kershaw in the fourth inning but the Dodgers fought back, tying the game on a RBI double by Yasiel Puig and a sacrifice fly by Seager's replacement Charlie Culberson in the fifth. Solo homers by Chris Taylor and Puig and an RBI hit by Justin Turner gave the Dodgers enough runs to win 5–2 as the bullpen shut the Cubs down over the last four innings of the game. In the second game, Jon Lester and Rich Hill each pitched four scoreless innings before allowing solo runs in the fifth, on an RBI single by Turner and a solo homer by Addison Russell. The bullpens kept the game tied until the bottom of the ninth when Turner hit a walk-off three-run homer off of John Lackey. It was the Dodgers first walk-off homer in the postseason since Kirk Gibson's homer in game one of the 1988 World Series.

The series moved to Wrigley Field in Chicago for game three. Kyle Schwarber homered off Yu Darvish in the first inning to give the Cubs the early lead yet again. It was the only run Darvish allowed in 6 1/3 innings, while he struck out seven Cubs batters. Andre Ethier, making his first start of the postseason, tied the game up with a solo homer in the second off of Kyle Hendricks and Chris Taylor homered in the third to put the Dodgers ahead. The Dodgers bullpen continued to shut down the Cubs, and the Dodgers added on against the Cubs bullpen to win the game 6–1. This was the sixth straight post-season game the Dodgers won, a franchise record. In game four, Jake Arrieta struck out nine batters over 6 2/3 innings in game five for the Cubs while Dodgers starter Alex Wood struck out seven in 4 2/3 innings. All the runs in the game were on solo homers. Cody Bellinger and Justin Turner for the Dodgers and Willson Contreras hit one and Javier Báez hit two homers for the Cubs who staved off elimination with a 3–2 win. Wade Davis pitched the last two innings for the save.

In the fifth game of the series, the Dodgers jumped on top early with a home run in the second by Enrique Hernández. He added two more home runs later in the game, including a grand slam. He became only the fourth Dodger to hit a postseason grand slam (joining Ron Cey and Dusty Baker from the 1981 NLCS and James Loney in the 2008 NLDS). His seven RBI in the game also set a NLCS record. The Dodgers cruised to an 11–1 win and a trip to their first World Series since 1988. Chris Taylor and Justin Turner were voted co-MVPs of the series. The Dodgers bullpen set a record with 23 consecutive scoreless innings in the postseason from game two of the NLDS through the completion of the NLCS.

=== World Series ===
The Dodgers faced the Houston Astros in the World Series, their first appearance in the series since they won in 1988. Clayton Kershaw started Game 1 for the Dodgers, while Dallas Keuchel started for the Astros. The temperature at the start of the game was 103 °F (39 °C), which made this the hottest World Series game ever recorded. Chris Taylor hit a home run for the Dodgers on Keuchel's first pitch of the game. It was the third home run to leadoff a game in Dodgers postseason history (Davey Lopes in 1978 World Series and Carl Crawford in 2013 NLDS). Alex Bregman hit a home run for the Astros in the fourth inning. In the sixth inning, Justin Turner hit a two-run home run for the Dodgers. Turner tied Duke Snider for most career runs batted in in Dodgers post-season history with 26. Kershaw struck out 11 in seven innings pitched with no walks and only three hits allowed while Keuchel allowed three runs on six hits in 6 2/3 innings. Brandon Morrow pitched a scoreless eighth and Kenley Jansen earned the save as the Dodgers took game one 3–1.

The starting pitchers for Game 2 were Rich Hill for the Dodgers and Justin Verlander for the Astros. The Astros scored first when Bregman drove in Josh Reddick with a hit in the third inning. Hill struck out seven in four innings but was replaced by Kenta Maeda in the fifth. Joc Pederson tied the game with a solo home run in the bottom of the fifth inning, and the Dodgers took the lead when Corey Seager hit a two-run home run in the bottom of the sixth inning. Verlander allowed two hits, both home runs, in his six innings pitched. Carlos Correa drove in the Astros second run of the game on a single in the eighth, ending the Dodgers bullpen's streak of 28 consecutive scoreless innings in the postseason. Marwin González hit a home run off Jansen in the ninth to tie the game. This was only Jansen's second blown save all season and snapped his streak of converting his first 12 post-season save opportunities, a major league record. The game went into extra innings. Jose Altuve and Correa hit home runs off Josh Fields in the 10th inning to put the Astros in the lead. In the bottom of the 10th inning, Yasiel Puig hit a home run off of Ken Giles and Enrique Hernández drove in Logan Forsythe to tie the game. In the next inning, George Springer hit a two-run home run for the Astros off of Brandon McCarthy to retake the lead. In the bottom of the 11th inning, Charlie Culberson hit a home run off of Chris Devenski, but Devenski struck out Puig to end the game. The teams set a new record for combined home runs in a single World Series game with eight. This was the first World Series game ever won by the Astros as they had been swept in their previous appearance in 2005.

The series moved to Minute Maid Park in Houston for game 3, which was started by Yu Darvish for the Dodgers and Lance McCullers Jr. for the Astros. The Astros scored four runs in the bottom of the second inning on a home run by Yuli Gurriel and RBIs by González, Brian McCann, and Bregman. Darvish left the game after 1 2/3 innings, which is the shortest outing of his career. The Dodgers scored one run in the top of the third inning as Seager grounded into a double play after McCullers loaded the bases with three consecutive walks. The Astros added another run in the fifth on an RBI single by Evan Gattis and the Dodgers added two in the sixth on an RBI groundout by Puig and a wild pitch. McCullers wound up pitching 5 1/3 innings and allowed three runs on four hits. He was replaced by Brad Peacock who no-hit the Dodgers over the last 3 2/3 innings to pick up his first career save. The starting pitchers for Game 4 were Alex Wood for the Dodgers and Charlie Morton for the Astros. Springer homered off Wood in the bottom of the sixth for the first run. It was the only hit Wood allowed in 5 2/3 innings pitched in the game. Forsythe drove in Cody Bellinger to tie the game in the top of the seventh. Morton struck out seven and only allowed three hits and one run in 6 1/3 innings. Bellinger then drove in the go-ahead run with a double in the top of the ninth off of Ken Giles and the Dodgers added four more runs on a sacrifice fly by Austin Barnes and a three-run homer by Pederson. Bregman homered off of Jansen in the bottom of the ninth but the Dodgers managed to even up the series. The Astros only got two hits in the game; both were home runs. This was the first game in World Series history where both starting pitchers allowed four or fewer baserunners. Pederson tied a Dodgers post-season record (Billy Cox, Andre Ethier, A. J. Ellis) with four straight starts with an extra base hit.

Kershaw and Keuchel started Game 5, in a rematch of the opening game of the series. Forsythe singled in two runs off of Keuchel in the first inning to put the Dodgers up early. A third run scored on a throwing error by Gurriel. Barnes singled in the fourth to score Forsythe. Keuchel pitched only 3 2/3 innings for the Astros, allowing five hits and four runs (three earned). This was his shortest home start of the season. The Astros scored their first run with an RBI double by Correa in the bottom of the fourth inning, followed by a three-run home run by Gurriel to tie the game. Bellinger hit a three-run home run off of Collin McHugh in the top of the fifth to put the Dodgers back on top only for Altuve to hit his own three-run home run in the bottom of the inning off Maeda to tie it back up. Kershaw only pitched 4 2/3 innings and allowed six runs on four hits and three walks. A triple by Bellinger on a line drive that Springer missed on a dive in the seventh inning off of Peacock scored Hernández from first base. In the bottom of the seventh inning, Springer hit a home run off the first pitch in the bottom of the inning off of Morrow, who was pitching for the third consecutive day, to tie the game. Bregman scored on a double by Altuve to put the Astros ahead for the first time in the game, and then Correa hit a two-run home run to extend the lead. Seager doubled in a run in the top of the eighth inning, but McCann hit a home run in the bottom of the inning. That was the 21st home run of the series, tying the record set in the 2002 World Series. Puig broke the record with a two-run home run in the top of the ninth inning. Taylor drove in Barnes to tie the game. With the teams combining to score 24 runs through the first nine innings, this was the highest scoring World Series game since the Florida Marlins beat the Cleveland Indians 14–11 in Game 3 of the 1997 World Series. Bregman singled in pinch runner Derek Fisher for the winning run in the tenth off of Jansen. The Astros became only the second team to come back twice from three runs down in a World Series game. The other were the Toronto Blue Jays in the 15–14 win during Game 4 of the 1993 World Series. This World Series set a new record for most players to hit a home run (14 to date in the World Series). The 2017 World Series also set a record for the number of players who hit at least one home run Game 5 lasted five hours and seventeen minutes, making it the second longest World Series game in history, trailing only the 14 inning contest between the Astros and the Chicago White Sox in Game 3 of the 2005 World Series and the six game tying home runs in the series to this point is the most for any World Series on record.

Game 6 featured the same starting pitchers as the second game: Verlander and Hill. Springer hit a solo home run off of Hill in the top of the third for the first run of the night. It was Springer's fourth homer of the series, tied for third all-time in a single series and joining Gene Tenace, in 1972, as the only players with four game-tying or go-ahead home runs in a World Series. The Astros loaded the bases in the fifth inning, but did not score. Hill pitched 4 2/3 innings, struck out five and allowed four hits and one run. In the sixth inning, Taylor tied the game with an RBI double and Seager hit a sacrifice fly to give the Dodgers the lead. Verlander pitched six innings with nine strikeouts and only three hits allowed. Pederson hit a home run in the bottom of the seventh inning and Jansen pitched two scoreless innings for the save. Pederson tied a World Series record with his fifth consecutive game with an extra base hit and Andre Ethier, who appeared in the game as a pinch hitter, set a new Dodgers franchise record with his 50th career postseason game.

The starting pitchers for this game were the same as in the third game: McCullers and Darvish. Springer doubled to open the game and scored the first run on an error by Bellinger, which allowed Bregman to reach second base. Bregman stole third base and scored on an Altuve ground out. McCann scored the next inning on a groundout by the pitcher McCullers. Springer then hit a two-run home run, tying Reggie Jackson and Chase Utley for most home runs in a single world series (5) and setting a new record with 29 total bases in any post-season series. Darvish lasted only 1 2/3 innings and became the third pitcher with two starts of less than two innings in the World Series, and the first since Art Ditmar in the 1960 World Series. Morrow relieved Darvish and in the process became only the second pitcher to pitch in all seven games of a single World Series, joining Darold Knowles in the 1973 World Series. McCullers lasted only 2 1/3 innings himself, he allowed three hits and hit a World Series record four batters. This was the first Game 7 in World Series history where neither starting pitcher got past the third inning. The Dodgers failed to score a run through five innings, despite having multiple runners in scoring position. Ethier, pinch hitting, scored Pederson on a single in the sixth inning for the Dodgers' only run. They only had one hit in 13 chances with runners in scoring position in the game. Kershaw pitched four scoreless innings of relief in the game, and in the process, he broke Orel Hershiser's Dodgers post-season record with his 33rd strikeout. Morton pitched four innings of relief to end the game, earning the win, as the Astros won their first World Series. It was later determined that the Astros illegally stole signs during the 2017 regular season and postseason.

== Roster ==
2017 Los Angeles Dodgers
Roster
Pitchers: 43 Luis Avilán; 52 Pedro Báez; 64 Walker Buehler; 59 Fabio Castillo; 54 Tony Cingrani; 21 Yu Darvish; 75 Grant Dayton; 46 Josh Fields; 62 Wilmer Font; 41 Chris Hatcher; 44 Rich Hill; 74 Kenley Jansen; 22 Clayton Kershaw; 36 Adam Liberatore; 18 Kenta Maeda; 38 Brandon McCarthy; 17 Brandon Morrow; 58 Edward Paredes; 71 Josh Ravin; 54 Sergio Romo; 99 Hyun-jin Ryu; 48 Brock Stewart; 68 Ross Stripling; 7 Julio Urías; 33 Tony Watson; 57 Alex Wood	Catchers: 15 Austin Barnes; 9 Yasmani Grandal; Infielders: 35 Cody Bellinger; 37 Charlie Culberson; 65 Kyle Farmer; 11 Logan Forsythe; 37 Mike Freeman; 23 Adrián González; 5 Corey Seager; 25 Rob Segedin; 10 Justin Turner; 26 Chase Utley	Outfielders: 67 O'Koyea Dickson; 50 Brett Eibner; 16 Andre Ethier; 6 Curtis Granderson; 28 Franklin Gutiérrez; 14 Enrique Hernández; 70 Tim Locastro; 31 Joc Pederson; 66 Yasiel Puig; 3 Chris Taylor; 21,47 Trayce Thompson; 60 Andrew Toles; 33 Scott Van Slyke; 61 Alex Verdugo	Manager: 30 Dave Roberts; Coaches: 56 Josh Bard (bullpen); 13 Juan Castro (quality assurance); 82 Steve Cilladi (bullpen catcher); 85 Rob Flippo (bullpen catcher); 8 Bob Geren (bench); 40 Rick Honeycutt (pitching); 49 Tim Hyers (assistant hitting); 27 George Lombard (first base); 12 Turner Ward (hitting); 45 Chris Woodward (third base); 7 Steve Yeager (catching)

== Player stats ==
=== Batting ===
List does not include pitchers. Stats in bold are the team leaders..

Note: G = Games played; AB = At bats; R = Runs; H = Hits; 2B = Doubles; 3B = Triples; HR = Home runs; RBI = Runs batted in; BB = Walks; SO = Strikeouts; SB = Stolen bases; Avg. = Batting average; OBP = On-base percentage; SLG = Slugging; OPS = On Base + Slugging

Player	G	AB	R	H	2B	3B	HR	RBI	BB	SO	SB	AVG	OBP	SLG	OPS
Corey Seager	145	**539**	85	**159**	33	0	22	77	67	131	4	.295	.375	.479	.854
Chris Taylor	140	514	85	148	**34**	**5**	21	72	50	142	**17**	.288	.354	.496	.850
Yasiel Puig	**152**	499	72	131	24	2	28	74	64	100	15	.263	.346	.487	.833
Cody Bellinger	132	480	**87**	128	26	4	**39**	**97**	64	**146**	10	.267	.352	**.581**	.933
Justin Turner	130	457	72	147	32	0	21	71	59	56	7	**.322**	**.415**	.530	**.945**
Yasmani Grandal	129	438	50	108	27	0	22	58	40	130	0	.247	.308	.459	.767
Logan Forsythe	119	361	56	81	19	0	6	36	**69**	109	3	.224	.351	.327	.678
Chase Utley	127	309	43	73	20	4	8	34	32	57	6	.236	.324	.405	.728
Enrique Hernández	140	297	46	64	24	2	11	37	41	80	3	.215	.308	.421	.729
Joc Pederson	102	273	44	58	20	0	11	35	39	68	4	.212	.331	.407	.738
Adrián González	71	231	14	56	17	0	3	30	16	43	0	.242	.287	.355	.642
Austin Barnes	102	218	35	63	15	2	8	38	39	43	4	.289	.408	.486	.895
Curtis Granderson	36	112	16	18	2	0	7	12	18	33	2	.161	.288	.366	.654
Andrew Toles	31	96	17	26	3	0	5	15	5	16	0	.271	.314	.458	.772
Franklin Gutiérrez	35	56	8	13	3	0	1	8	7	16	0	.232	.317	.339	.657
Trayce Thompson	27	49	6	6	2	1	1	2	6	23	0	.122	.218	.265	.483
Scott Van Slyke	29	41	6	5	1	0	2	3	7	15	1	.122	.250	.293	.543
Andre Ethier	22	34	3	8	1	0	2	3	4	10	0	.235	.316	.441	.757
Brett Eibner	17	33	3	6	0	0	2	6	2	17	0	.182	.250	.364	.614
Alex Verdugo	15	23	1	4	0	0	1	1	2	4	0	.174	.240	.304	.544
Kyle Farmer	20	20	1	6	1	0	0	2	0	3	0	.300	.300	.350	.650
Rob Segedin	13	20	3	4	2	0	0	1	0	7	0	.200	.200	.300	.500
Charlie Culberson	15	13	0	2	1	0	0	1	2	4	0	.154	.267	.231	.497
O'Koyea Dickson	7	7	0	1	0	0	0	0	2	2	0	.143	.333	.143	.476
Mike Freeman	4	5	0	0	0	0	0	0	0	2	0	.000	.000	.000	.000
Tim Locastro	3	1	0	0	0	0	0	0	0	0	1	.000	.000	.000	.000
Non-Pitcher Totals	162	5126	753	1315	307	20	221	713	635	1257	77	.257	.343	.454	797
**Team totals**	**162**	**5408**	**770**	**1347**	**312**	**20**	**221**	**730**	**649**	**1380**	**77**	**.249**	**.334**	**.437**	**.771**

=== Pitching ===
Stats in bold are the team leaders.

Note: W = Wins; L = Losses; ERA = Earned run average; G = Games pitched; GS = Games started; SV = Saves; IP = Innings pitched; H = Hits allowed; R = Runs allowed; ER = Earned runs allowed; BB = Walks allowed; K = Strikeouts

Player	W	L	ERA	G	GS	SV	IP	H	R	ER	BB	K
Clayton Kershaw	**18**	4	**2.31**	27	**27**	0	**175.0**	**136**	49	45	30	**202**
Alex Wood	16	3	2.72	27	25	0	152.1	123	50	46	38	151
Rich Hill	12	8	3.32	25	25	0	135.2	99	51	50	**49**	166
Kenta Maeda	13	6	4.22	29	25	1	134.1	121	**68**	**63**	34	140
Hyun-jin Ryu	5	**9**	3.77	25	24	1	126.2	128	58	53	45	116
Brandon McCarthy	6	4	3.98	19	16	0	92.2	89	43	41	27	72
Ross Stripling	3	5	3.75	49	2	2	74.1	69	31	31	19	74
Kenley Jansen	5	0	1.32	65	0	**41**	68.1	44	11	10	7	109
Pedro Báez	3	6	2.95	**66**	0	0	64.0	56	24	21	29	64
Josh Fields	5	0	2.84	57	0	2	57.0	40	19	18	15	60
Yu Darvish	4	3	3.44	9	9	0	49.2	44	20	19	13	61
Luis Avilán	2	3	2.93	61	0	0	46.0	42	16	15	22	52
Brandon Morrow	6	0	2.06	45	0	2	43.2	31	10	10	9	50
Chris Hatcher	0	1	4.66	26	0	0	36.2	37	20	19	12	43
Brock Stewart	0	0	3.41	17	4	1	34.1	28	18	13	19	29
Sergio Romo	1	1	6.12	30	0	0	25.0	23	17	17	12	31
Grant Dayton	1	1	4.94	29	0	0	23.2	19	13	13	12	20
Julio Urías	0	2	5.40	5	5	0	23.1	23	15	14	14	11
Tony Watson	2	1	2.70	24	0	0	20.0	15	6	6	6	18
Tony Cingrani	0	0	2.79	22	0	0	19.1	15	8	6	6	28
Josh Ravin	0	1	6.48	14	0	1	16.2	12	12	12	9	19
Walker Buehler	1	0	7.71	8	0	0	9.1	11	8	8	8	12
Edward Paredes	1	0	3.24	10	0	0	8.1	8	3	3	0	111
Wilmer Font	0	0	17.18	3	0	0	3.2	7	7	7	4	3
Adam Liberatore	0	0	2.70	4	0	0	3.1	3	1	1	2	5
Fabio Castillo	0	0	13.50	2	0	0	1.1	3	2	2	1	2
**Team totals**	**104**	**58**	**3.38**	**162**	**162**	**51**	**1444.2**	**1226**	**580**	**543**	**442**	**1549**

== Awards and honors ==
Recipient	Award	Date awarded	Ref.
Cody Bellinger	National League Player of the Week (May 1–7)	May 8, 2017	
Alex Wood	National League Player of the Week (May 8–14)	May 15, 2017	
Cody Bellinger	National League Rookie of the Month (May)	June 2, 2017	
Alex Wood	National League Pitcher of the Month (May)	June 2, 2017	
Cody Bellinger	National League Player of the Week (June 19–25)	June 26, 2017	
Cody Bellinger	National League All-Star Team	July 2, 2017	
Corey Seager	National League All-Star Team	July 2, 2017	
Clayton Kershaw	National League All-Star Team	July 2, 2017	
Kenley Jansen	National League All-Star Team	July 2, 2017	
Cody Bellinger	National League Rookie of the Month (June)	July 3, 2017	
Justin Turner	National League All-Star Team	July 6, 2017	
Alex Wood	National League All-Star Team	July 7, 2017	
Rich Hill	National League Pitcher of the Month (July)	August 2, 2017	
Justin Turner	National League Championship Series MVP	October 19, 2017	
Chris Taylor	National League Championship Series MVP	October 19, 2017	
Cody Bellinger	Sporting News NL Rookie of the Year	October 23, 2017	
Kenley Jansen	Trevor Hoffman National League Reliever of the Year	October 28, 2017	
Clayton Kershaw	Baseball America ALL-MLB TEAM	October 28, 2017	
Kenley Jansen	Baseball America ALL-MLB TEAM	October 28, 2017	
Cody Bellinger	Topps All-Star Rookie Team	November 7, 2017	
Cody Bellinger	Players Choice National League Outstanding Rookie	November 8, 2017	
Corey Seager	Silver Slugger Award	November 9, 2017	
Yasiel Puig	Wilson Defensive Player of the Year Award - Right Field	November 10, 2017	
Los Angeles Dodgers	Wilson Best Defensive Team in Baseball Award	November 10, 2017	
Cody Bellinger	National League Rookie of the Year Award	November 13, 2017	
Los Angeles Dodgers	Baseball America Organization of the Year	November 28, 2017	
Clayton Kershaw	Warren Spahn Award	December 12, 2017	
Cody Bellinger	Los Angeles Sports Council Sportsman of the Year	January 3, 2018	

== Transactions ==
=== April ===
- On April 2, placed RHP Pedro Báez (right wrist contusion), LHP Scott Kazmir (left hip strain), RHP Josh Ravin (right groin strain), RHP Brock Stewart (right shoulder tendinitis), and OF Andre Ethier (herniated disc in back) on the 10-day disabled list.
- On April 7, placed LHP Rich Hill on the 10-day disabled list due to a blister on his left middle finger and recalled RHP Josh Fields from AAA Oklahoma City.
- On April 10, acquired RHP Joe Gunkel from the Baltimore Orioles in exchange for a player to be named later or cash.
- On April 11, optioned RHP Joe Gunkel to AAA Oklahoma City.
- On April 12, placed OF Franklin Gutiérrez on the 10-day disabled list with a strained left hamstring and recalled OF Trayce Thompson from AAA Oklahoma City.
- On April 14, activated RHP Pedro Báez from the 10-day disabled list and optioned RHP Josh Fields to AAA Oklahoma City.
- On April 16, activated LHP Rich Hill from the 10-day disabled list and optioned OF Trayce Thompson to AAA Oklahoma City.
- On April 17, placed LHP Rich Hill on the 10-day disabled list due to a blister on his left middle finger and recalled IF/OF Rob Segedin from AAA Oklahoma City.
- On April 18, placed LHP Grant Dayton on the 10-day disabled list with a left intercostal strain and recalled RHP Josh Fields from AAA Oklahoma City.
- On April 19, placed IF Logan Forsythe on the 10-day disabled list with a broken right toe and recalled IF Chris Taylor from AAA Oklahoma City. Placed IF/OF Rob Segedin on the 10-day disabled list with right toe strain and recalled OF Brett Eibner from AAA Oklahoma City.
- On April 23, optioned OF Brett Eibner to AAA Oklahoma City and recalled LHP Adam Liberatore from AAA Oklahoma City.
- On April 24, placed OF Joc Pederson on the 10-day disabled list with a right groin strain and recalled OF Brett Eibner from AAA Oklahoma City.
- On April 25, optioned OF Brett Eibner to AAA Oklahoma City, purchased the contract of 1B/OF Cody Bellinger from AAA Oklahoma City and designated RHP Joe Gunkel for assignment.
- On April 27, recalled LHP Julio Urías from AAA Oklahoma City and optioned LHP Adam Liberatore to AAA Oklahoma City.
- On April 29, activated LHP Grant Dayton from the 10-day disabled list and optioned RHP Josh Fields to AAA Oklahoma City.

=== May ===
- On May 1, placed LHP Hyun-jin Ryu on the 10-day disabled list with a left hip contusion and recalled RHP Josh Fields from AAA Oklahoma City.
- On May 2, activated OF Franklin Gutiérrez from the 10-day disabled list and optioned OF/1B Scott Van Slyke to AAA Oklahoma City.
- On May 5, activated OF Joc Pederson from the 10-day disabled list and placed 1B Adrián González on the 10-day disabled list with right elbow soreness.
- On May 8, placed RHP Brandon McCarthy on the 10-day disabled list, retroactive to May 5, with left shoulder soreness, and recalled LHP Adam Liberatore from AAA Oklahoma City.
- On May 9, claimed LHP Justin Marks off waivers from the Tampa Bay Rays and transferred OF Andre Ethier from the 10-day disabled list to the 60-day disabled list. Marks was optioned to AAA Oklahoma City.
- On May 10, placed OF Andrew Toles (torn ACL) and LHP Adam Liberatore (groin strain) on the 10-day disabled list and recalled OF Brett Eibner and 1B/OF Scott Van Slyke from AAA Oklahoma City. Activated RHP Josh Ravin from the 10-day disabled list and optioned him to AAA Oklahoma City.
- On May 11, placed RHP Kenta Maeda on the 10-day disabled list with left hamstring tightness and activated LHP Hyun-jin Ryu from the 10-day disabled list.
- On May 15, activated RHP Brandon McCarthy from the 10-day disabled list and optioned OF Brett Eibner to AAA Oklahoma City.
- On May 16, activated LHP Rich Hill from the 10-day disabled list and optioned LHP Grant Dayton to AAA Oklahoma City.
- On May 18, activated 1B Adrián González from the 10-day disabled list and optioned 1B/OF Scott Van Slyke to AAA Oklahoma City.
- On May 21, optioned LHP Julio Urías to AAA Oklahoma City and recalled RHP Josh Ravin from AAA Oklahoma City.
- On May 23, activated IF Logan Forsythe from the 10-day disabled list and optioned RHP Josh Ravin to AAA Oklahoma City.
- On May 25, activated RHP Kenta Maeda from the 10-day disabled list and placed OF Joc Pederson on the 7-day disabled list with a concussion. Placed LHP Luis Avilán on the 10-day disabled list with left triceps soreness and activated LHP Adam Liberatore from the 10-day disabled list.
- On May 26, claimed RHP Chris Heston and IF Mike Freeman off waivers from the Seattle Mariners and optioned them to AAA Oklahoma City. Transferred LHP Scott Kazmir and OF Andrew Toles from the 10-day disabled list to the 60-day disabled list.
- On May 29, placed LHP Alex Wood on the 10-day disabled list with left SC joint inflammation, purchased the contract of RHP Brandon Morrow from AAA Oklahoma City and transferred RHP Brock Stewart from the 10-day disabled list to the 60-day disabled list.

=== June ===
- On June 1, placed LHP Adam Liberatore on the 10-day disabled list with left forearm tightness and recalled LHP Grant Dayton from AAA Oklahoma City.
- On June 2, acquired LHP Jason Wheeler from the Minnesota Twins for cash considerations and optioned him to AAA Oklahoma City. Transferred IF/OF Rob Segedin from the 10-day disabled list to the 60-day disabled list.
- On June 7, RHP Chris Heston was claimed off waivers by the Minnesota Twins. Activated RHP Brock Stewart from the 60-day disabled list and optioned him to AAA Oklahoma City.
- On June 8, purchased the contract of RHP Fabio Castillo from AAA Oklahoma City and optioned him to AAA Oklahoma City, designated LHP Justin Marks for assignment.
- On June 9, Activated 3B Justin Turner from the 10-day disabled list, and optioned OF Brett Eibner to AAA Oklahoma City. Activated LHP Luis Avilán from the 10-day disabled list and placed RHP Sergio Romo on the 10-day disabled list with a left ankle sprain.
- On June 10, activated LHP Alex Wood from the 10-day disabled list and optioned RHP Brandon Morrow to AAA Oklahoma City.
- On June 13, activated OF Joc Pederson from the 7-day disabled list and placed 1B Adrián González on the 10-day disabled list with lower back discomfort.
- On June 15, optioned RHP Ross Stripling to AAA Oklahoma City.
- On June 16, recalled RHP Josh Ravin from AAA Oklahoma City.
- On June 18, recalled RHP Brock Stewart from AAA Oklahoma City, optioned RHP Josh Ravin to AAA Oklahoma City, claimed OF Peter O'Brien on waivers from the Texas Rangers, and designated RHP Jason Wheeler for assignment. Optioned O'Brien to AAA Oklahoma City.
- On June 19, activated RHP Sergio Romo from the 10-day disabled list and optioned RHP Josh Fields to AAA Oklahoma City.
- On June 21, optioned RHP Brock Stewart to AAA Oklahoma City and recalled RHP Brandon Morrow from AAA Oklahoma City.
- On June 23, placed RHP Chris Hatcher on the 10-day disabled list with thoracic inflammation and recalled RHP Ross Stripling from AAA Oklahoma City.
- On June 25, placed OF Franklin Gutiérrez on the 10-day disabled list with ankylosis spondylitis and recalled IF/OF Mike Freeman from AAA Oklahoma City.
- On June 26, placed RHP Brandon McCarthy on the 10-day disabled list with right knee inflammation, optioned RHP Ross Stripling to AAA Oklahoma City and recalled RHP Brock Stewart and OF Trayce Thompson from AAA Oklahoma City.
- On July 1, optioned IF/OF Mike Freeman to AAA Oklahoma City and recalled RHP Josh Fields from AAA Oklahoma City.

=== July ===
- On July 4, placed LHP Hyun-jin Ryu on the 10-day disabled list with a left foot contusion and recalled RHP Ross Stripling from AAA Oklahoma City.
- On July 6, placed LHP Grant Dayton on the 10-day disabled list with neck stiffness and recalled 1B/OF Scott Van Slyke from AAA Oklahoma City.
- On July 8, activated RHP Brandon McCarthy from the 10-day disabled list and optioned 1B/OF Scott Van Slyke to AAA Oklahoma City.
- On July 20, activated LHP Grant Dayton from the 10-day disabled list and designated RHP Sergio Romo for assignment.
- On July 24, placed LHP Clayton Kershaw on the 10-day disabled list with lower back strain, placed RHP Brandon McCarthy on the 10-day disabled list with a blister on his right middle finger, activated LHP Hyun-jin Ryu from the 10-day disabled list, recalled RHP Josh Ravin from AAA Oklahoma City, optioned OF Trayce Thompson to AAA Oklahoma City and purchased the contract of LHP Edward Paredes from AAA Oklahoma City.
- On July 28, acquired RHP Luke Farrell from the Kansas City Royals for cash considerations and optioned him to AAA Oklahoma City. Transferred LHP Adam Liberatore from the 10-day disabled list to the 60-day disabled list. Placed LHP Grant Dayton on the 10-day disabled list with neck pain and recalled C/IF Kyle Farmer from AAA Oklahoma City.
- On July 29, acquired LHP Luis Ysla from the Boston Red Sox for cash considerations and optioned him to AA Tulsa. Transferred 1B Adrián González from the 10-day disabled list to the 60-day disabled list.
- On July 31, acquired LHP Tony Watson from the Pittsburgh Pirates for minor league pitcher Angel German and minor league infielder Oneil Cruz. Designated OF Peter O'Brien for assignment. Acquired RHP Yu Darvish from the Texas Rangers in exchange for minor leaguer pitcher A. J. Alexy and minor league infielders Willie Calhoun and Brendon Davis and designated IF/OF Mike Freeman for assignment. Acquired LHP Tony Cingrani from the Cincinnati Reds in exchange for 1B/OF Scott Van Slyke and minor league catcher Henrik Clementina.

=== August ===
- On August 1, activated LHP Tony Watson and optioned LHP Edward Paredes to AAA Oklahoma City.
- On August 2, activated RHP Yu Darvish and optioned RHP Josh Ravin to AAA Oklahoma City.
- On August 3, activated LHP Tony Cingrani and optioned RHP Brock Stewart to AAA Oklahoma City.
- On August 4, claimed RHP Dylan Floro off waivers from the Chicago Cubs and optioned him to AAA Oklahoma City. Transferred OF Franklin Gutiérrez from the 10-day disabled list to the 60-day disabled list.
- On August 8, LHP Luis Avilán was placed on the paternity list and RHP Brock Stewart was recalled from AAA Oklahoma City.
- On August 9, RHP Luke Farrell was claimed on waivers by the Cincinnati Reds.
- On August 11, LHP Luis Avilán was activated from the paternity list and RHP Brock Stewart was optioned to AAA Oklahoma City.
- On August 13, activated RHP Chris Hatcher from the 10-day disabled list and optioned C/IF Kyle Farmer to AAA Oklahoma City.
- On August 15, traded RHP Chris Hatcher to the Oakland Athletics for international bonus slot money and activated IF/OF Rob Segedin from the 60-day disabled list.
- On August 18, activated 1B Adrián González from the 60-day disabled list and optioned IF/OF Rob Segedin to AAA Oklahoma City. Acquired OF Curtis Granderson from the New York Mets in exchange for cash or a player to be named later. Designated RHP Dylan Floro for assignment.
- On August 19, placed RHP Yu Darvish on the 10-day disabled list with back tightness, recalled LHP Edward Paredes from AAA Oklahoma City and optioned OF Joc Pederson to AAA Oklahoma City.
- On August 20, claimed RHP Jordan Jankowski off waivers from the Houston Astros and optioned him to AAA Oklahoma City. Traded RHP Jacob Rhame to the New York Mets as the player to be named later in the Granderson trade.
- On August 22, placed LHP Alex Wood on the 10-day disabled list with inflammation of the sternoclavicular joint and 1B/OF Cody Bellinger on the 10-day disabled list with a mild right ankle sprain and recalled RHP Brock Stewart and RHP Josh Ravin from AAA Oklahoma City.
- On August 23, optioned RHP Brock Stewart to AAA Oklahoma City and recalled C/IF Kyle Farmer from AAA Oklahoma City.
- On August 27, activated RHP Yu Darvish from the 10-day disabled list and placed RHP Josh Fields on the 10-day disabled list with lower back strain.
- On August 30, activated 1B/OF Cody Bellinger from the 10-day disabled list and optioned C/IF Kyle Farmer to AAA Oklahoma City.

=== September ===
- On September 1, activated LHP Clayton Kershaw from the 10-day disabled list and OF Andre Ethier from the 60-day disabled list, recalled IF/OF Rob Segedin and RHP Fabio Castillo from AAA Oklahoma City, purchased the contracts of OF Alex Verdugo and 1B/OF O'Koyea Dickson from AAA Oklahoma City, transferred LHP Grant Dayton from the 10-day disabled list to the 60-day disabled list and designated OF Brett Eibner and LHP Luis Ysla for assignment.
- On September 2, recalled RHP Brock Stewart from AAA Oklahoma City, purchased the contract of RHP Wilmer Font from AAA Oklahoma City and designated RHP Jordan Jankowski for assignment.
- On September 3, activated LHP Alex Wood from the 10-day disabled list.
- On September 4, activated RHP Josh Fields from the 10-day disabled list, purchased the contract of IF Charlie Culberson from AAA Oklahoma City and transferred RHP Brandon McCarthy from the 10-day disabled list to the 60-day disabled list.
- On September 5, recalled OFs Joc Pederson and Trayce Thompson from AAA Oklahoma City.
- On September 6, purchased the contract of RHP Walker Buehler from AAA Oklahoma City and designated RHP Fabio Castillo for assignment.
- On September 9, recalled C/IF Kyle Farmer from AAA Oklahoma City.
- On September 22, activated RHP Brandon McCarthy from the 60-day disabled list and placed RHP Josh Ravin on the 60-day disabled list with a right abdomen strain.
- On September 29, purchased the contract of IF Tim Locastro from AAA Oklahoma City and placed 1B/OF O'Koyea Dickson on the 60-day disabled list with a sore left shoulder.

== Farm system ==
Level	Team	League	Manager	W	L	Position
AAA	Oklahoma City Dodgers	Pacific Coast League	Bill Haselman	72	69	2nd place
AA	Tulsa Drillers	Texas League	Ryan Garko; Scott Hennessey	77	63	1st place Lost in championship game
High A	Rancho Cucamonga Quakes	California League	Drew Saylor	76	64	2nd place Lost in playoffs
A	Great Lakes Loons	Midwest League	Jeremy Rodriguez	69	70	5th place
Rookie	Ogden Raptors	Pioneer League	Mark Kertenian	47	29	2nd place League champions
Rookie	Arizona League Dodgers	Arizona League	John Shoemaker	37	19	1st place Lost in playoffs
Rookie	DSL Dodgers 1	Dominican Summer League	Keyter Collado	47	24	1st place Lost in championship game
Rookie	DSL Dodgers 2	Dominican Summer League	Austin Chubb	44	28	1st place League champions

=== Minor League statistical leaders ===
==== Batting ====
- Average: Romer Cuadrado - Ogden - .335
- Home runs: Ibandel Isabel - Rancho Cucamonga - 28
- RBI: Edwin Rios - Oklahoma City - 91
- OBP: Romer Cuadrado - Ogden - .413
- SLG: Willie Calhoun - Oklahoma City - .574

==== Pitching ====
- ERA: Miguel Urena - Ogden - 2.71
- Wins: Justin Masterson - Oklahoma City - 11
- Strikeouts: Wilmer Font - Oklahoma City - 178
- Saves: Corey Copping - Tulsa - 18
- WHIP: Jesus Vargas - AZL - 1.07

=== Mid-Season All-Stars ===
- All-Star Futures Game

Pitcher Yadier Álvarez (World team)
Outfielder Alex Verdugo (World team)

- Pacific Coast League All-Stars

Pitcher Wilmer Font
Pitcher Madison Younginer
Second Baseman Willie Calhoun
Outfielder Alex Verdugo

- Texas League All-Stars

Pitcher Scott Barlow
Pitcher Walker Buehler
Pitcher Corey Copping
Catcher Paul Hoenecke
First Baseman Michael Ahmed (starter)
First Baseman Matt Beaty
Shortstop Tim Locastro
Third Basmean Edwin Ríos (starter)
Outfielder Kyle Garlick

- California League All-Stars

Pitcher Caleb Ferguson
Pitcher Dennis Santana
Catcher Will Smith (starter)
First Baseman Ibandel Isabel
Outfielder D. J. Peters
Outfielder Luke Raley (starter)

- Midwest League All-Stars

Pitcher Dustin May
Catcher Keibert Ruiz
Infielder Brendon Davis

- Pioneer League All-Stars

Pitcher James Carter
Catcher Hendrik Clementina
Infielder Nick Yarnall
Outfielder Starling Heredia
Outfielder Luis Paz

- Dominican Summer League All-Stars

Pitcher Antonio Hernandez
Pitcher Juan Morillo
Catcher Marco Hernandez

=== Post-Season All-Stars ===
- Pacific Coast League All-Stars

Pitcher Wilmer Font (PCL Pitcher of the Year)

- Texas League All-Stars

Pitcher Scott Barlow
Infielder Matt Beaty (Texas League Player of the Year)

- California League All-Stars

Pitcher Caleb Ferguson
First Baseman Ibandel Isabel
Outfielder D. J. Peters (California League MVP)

- Pioneer League All-Stars

Catcher Luis Paz

=== Notes ===
- Walker Buehler and Keibert Ruiz were named the Dodgers minor league pitcher and player of the year.
- The Rancho Cucamonga Quakes clinched a playoff spot with an 11–3 win over the Lake Elsinore Storm on September 1. The Quakes lost to the Lancaster JetHawks in three games in the first round of the playoffs.
- The Tulsa Drillers clinched the Texas League North Division second half title and a spot in the playoffs with a walk-off, 6–5, win over the Springfield Cardinals on September 2. The advanced to the league championship series with a three games to two series victory over the Northwest Arkansas Naturals in the semi-finals. The Drillers lost in five games to the Midland RockHounds in the championship series.
- The two Dodgers affiliates in the Dominican Summer League played each other in the league championship game, with the DSL Dodgers 2 defeating the DSL Dodgers 1 by a score of 6–4 to win the Dodgers first DSL championship since 2000.
- The Arizona League Dodgers won their division and made the playoffs but lost in the semi-finals to the Arizona League Cubs.
- The Ogden Raptors clinched a spot in the Pioneer League playoffs with an 11–7 win over the Grand Junction Rockies on September 6 and then swept the best of three first round playoff series against the Orem Owlz to advance to the league championship series for the first time since 1969. The Raptors defeated the Great Falls Voyagers in three games to win their first championship since joining the Pioneer League.

== Major League Baseball draft ==
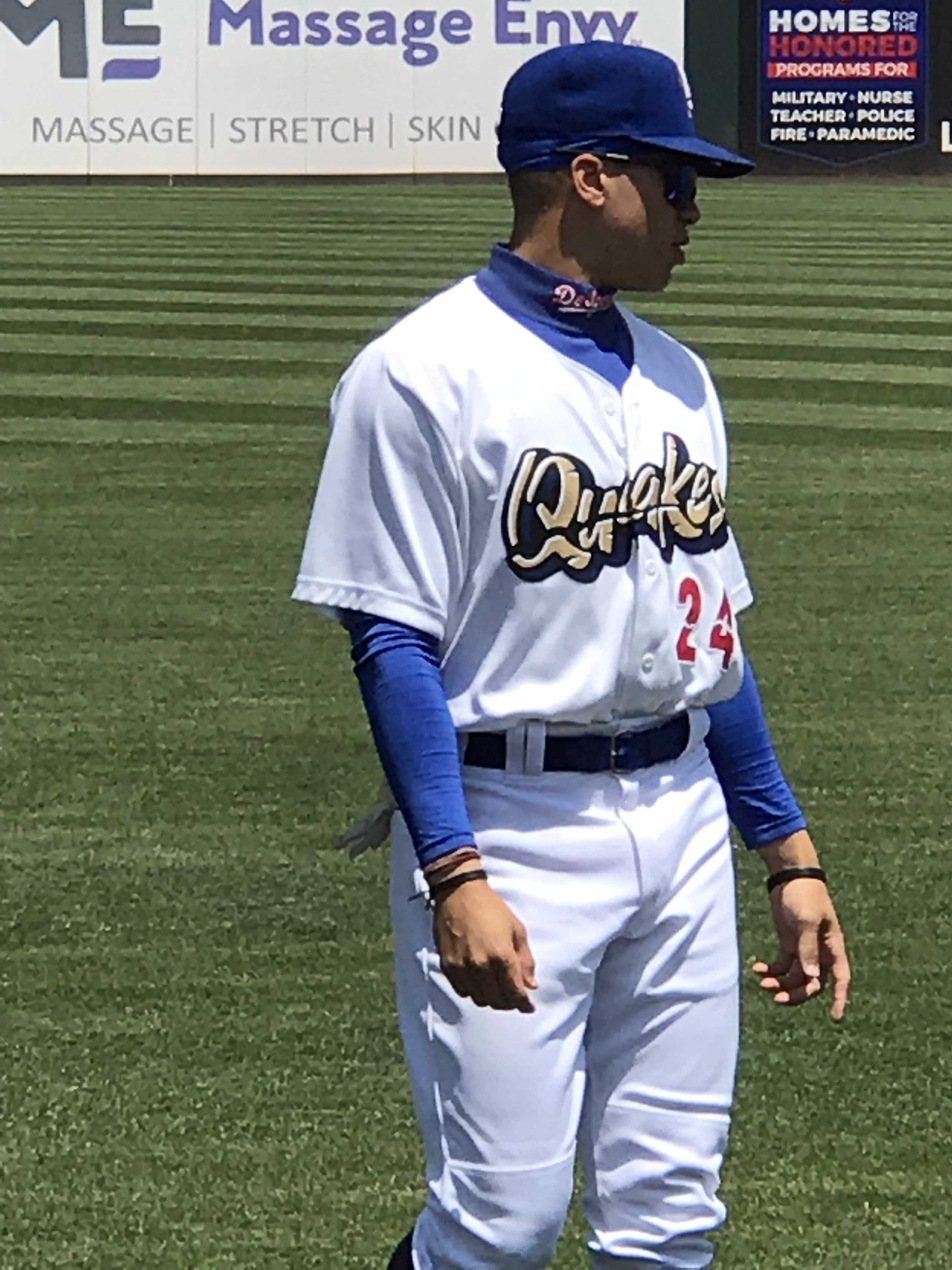
Jeren Kendall

The Dodgers selected 40 players in this draft. In the first round, they selected outfielder Jeren Kendall from Vanderbilt University. Kendall played in the Dodgers farm system through the 2022 season before retiring, never making it above AA while hitting .209 for his career. As of the 2026 season, nine members of this draft class have played in MLB.

2017 draft picks

Round	Name	Position	School	Signed	Career span	Highest level
1	Jeren Kendall	OF	Vanderbilt University	Yes	2017–2022	AA
2	Morgan Cooper	RHP	University of Texas	Yes	2021	A+
3	Connor Wong	C	University of Houston	Yes	2017–present	MLB
4	James Marinan	RHP	Park Vista Community High School	Yes	2017–2024	A+
5	Riley Ottesen	RHP	University of Utah	Yes	2017–2023	A
6	Wills Montgomerie	RHP	University of Connecticut	Yes	2017–2019	A+
7	Zachery Pop	RHP	University of Kentucky	Yes	2017–present	MLB
8	Rylan Bannon	3B	Xavier University	Yes	2017–2024	MLB
9	Connor Strain	RHP	University of Evansville	Yes	2018–2019	A+
10	Zach Reks	OF	University of Kentucky	Yes	2017–2024	MLB
11	Jacob Amaya	SS	South Hills High School	Yes	2017–present	MLB
12	Andre Jackson	RHP	University of Utah	Yes	2018–present	MLB
13	Marshall Kasowski	RHP	West Texas A&M University	Yes	2017–2024	AAA
14	Josh McLain	CF	North Carolina State University	No; Dodgers–2018	2018–2019	A
15	Marcus Chiu	2B	Marin Community College	Yes	2017–2024	AA
16	Evy Ruibal	RHP	Notre Dame	Yes	2017–2023	A+
17	Nathan Witt	RHP	Michigan State University	Yes	2017–2023	AA
18	Max Gamboa	RHP	Pepperdine University	Yes	2017–2021	AA
19	Zach Willeman	RHP	Kent State University	Yes	2018–present	AAA
20	Donovan Casey	OF	Boston College	Yes	2017–present	AAA
21	Joshua Rivera	SS	Carlos Beltran Academy	No; White Sox–2019	2019–2022	A
22	Justin Hoyt	LHP	Jacksonville State University	Yes	2017–2018	AA
23	Connor Heady	SS	University of Kentucky	Yes	2017–2018	Rookie
24	Preston Grand Pre	SS	University of California	Yes	2017–2018	Rookie
25	Mark Washington	RHP	Lehigh University	Yes	2017–2025	AAA
26	Devin Hemmerich	LHP	Norfolk State University	Yes	2017–2019	A+
27	Jeremy Arocho	SS	Old Mill Senior High School	Yes	2017–present	AAA
28	Justin Lewis	LHP	Cornell University	Yes	2017–2021	Rookie
29	Deacon Liput	2B	University of Florida	No; Dodgers–2018	2018–2021	AAA
30	Chris Roller	CF	McLennan Community College	Yes	2017–present	MLB
31	Hunter Mercado-Hood	OF	University of San Diego	No		
32	Tyler Adkison	OF	San Diego State University	Yes	2017	A
33	Brett de Geus	RHP	Cabrillo College	Yes	2018–present	MLB
34	Dan Jagiello	RHP	LIU Post	Yes	2017–2018	A+
35	Colby Nealy	RHP	Washington State University	Yes	2017–2022	A
36	Riley Richert	RHP	Howard College	Yes	2017–2018	Rookie
37	Corey Merrill	RHP	Tulane University	Yes	2019	Rookie
38	Preston White	OF	Birmingham–Southern College	No; Giants - 2018	2018–2019	A
39	Logan White	C	Mountain Pointe High School	No		
40	Clayton Andrews	LHP	Cabrillo College	No; Brewers - 2018	2018–present	MLB
