= Rob Segedin =

American baseball player (born 1988)

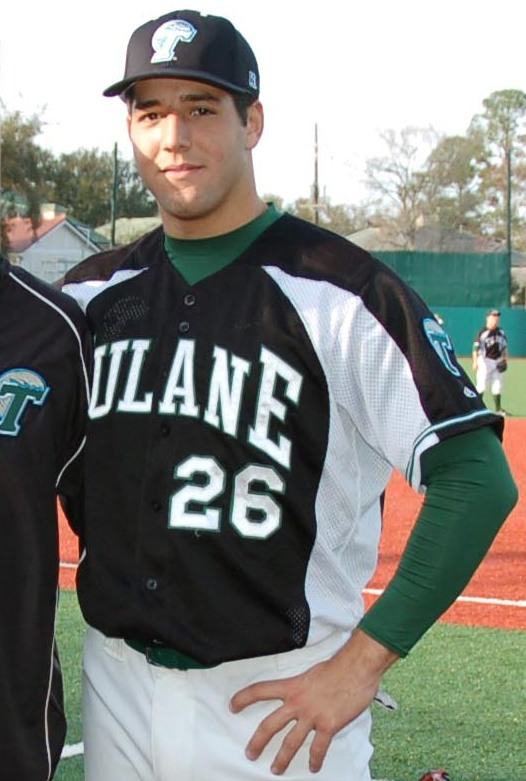
- Segedin with Tulane in 2008
- First Baseman / Third baseman / Outfielder
- Born: November 10, 1988 (age 37); Old Tappan, New Jersey, U.S.
- Batted: Right Threw: Right

MLB debut
- August 7, 2016, for the Los Angeles Dodgers

Last MLB appearance
- October 1, 2017, for the Los Angeles Dodgers

MLB statistics
- Batting average: .226
- Home runs: 2
- Runs batted in: 13
- Stats at Baseball Reference

Teams
- Los Angeles Dodgers (2016–2017)

Robert Mitchell Segedin (born November 10, 1988) is an American former professional baseball player. He played first base, third base and outfield in Major League Baseball (MLB) for the Los Angeles Dodgers in 2016 and 2017.

== Career ==
=== Amateur ===
Segedin attended Northern Valley Regional High School in Old Tappan, New Jersey, and Tulane University. In 2008, he played collegiate summer baseball with the Falmouth Commodores of the Cape Cod Baseball League, and returned to the league in 2009 to play for the Bourne Braves. Playing college baseball for the Tulane Green Wave, Segedin was named a semifinalist for the Golden Spikes Award in 2010, his junior year.

=== New York Yankees ===
The New York Yankees selected Segedin in the third round of the 2010 MLB draft, with the 112th overall selection. Segedin signed with the Yankees, foregoing his senior year, receiving a signing bonus of $377,500. He played for the Staten Island Yankees of the Class A-Short Season New York–Penn League after signing.

Segedin began the 2011 season with the Charleston RiverDogs of the Class A South Atlantic League, and received a midseason promotion to the Tampa Yankees of the Class A-Advanced Florida State League. While playing for the Trenton Thunder of the Class AA Eastern League in 2013, Segedin injured his hip and underwent surgery to correct a femoral acetabular impingement.

He played for Trenton and the Scranton/Wilkes-Barre RailRiders of the Class AAA International League in 2014, batting a combined .256/.361/.386. He began the 2015 season with Scranton/Wilkes-Barre, for whom he batted .278 in 46 games, and was demoted to Trenton in July, at which point Segedin requested his release. The Yankees declined the request, and Segedin considered retirement, but chose to continue playing.

=== Los Angeles Dodgers ===
After the 2015 season, the Yankees traded Segedin and a player to be named later or cash to the Los Angeles Dodgers for Tyler Olson and Ronald Torreyes. The Dodgers invited him to spring training, and they assigned him to the Oklahoma City Dodgers of the Class AAA Pacific Coast League to begin the season. He was selected to appear in the mid-season Triple-A All-Star Game representing the Pacific Coast League and was also selected to the PCL post-season all-star team. In 103 games he hit .319 with 21 homers and 69 RBI.

On August 7, the Dodgers promoted Segedin to the major leagues. In his major league debut, the same day, against the Boston Red Sox, he set a Dodgers franchise record with four RBI. His first career hit was a double off of David Price. He hit his first home run on August 22 off of Josh Smith of the Cincinnati Reds. In 40 games for the Dodgers, he hit .233 with two homers and 12 RBI.

Sedegin played for Team Italy in the 2017 World Baseball Classic

Segedin was again assigned to Oklahoma City to begin the 2017 season. On April 19, 2017, Segedin was placed on the 10-day disabled list due to a strained big right toe. On May 26, it was revealed that he had suffered a wrist injury while rehabbing his foot and would require surgery, extending his stay on the disabled list. He did play in 13 games for the Dodgers, and had four hits in 20 at-bats. In 2018. he played in 35 games for Oklahoma City, hitting only .211.

Segedin was designated for assignment by the Dodgers on August 30, 2018 after missing most of the minor league season due to injuries. He retired from baseball because of chronic arthritis at the conclusion of the season.

=== Post-playing career ===
In December 2018, Segedin was hired by the Philadelphia Phillies as a Player Information Assistant.

== Personal life ==
Segedin is married; he met his wife, Robin, at Tulane. During the winter of 2015–16, Segedin began taking online courses from Indiana University to earn a Master of Business Administration. On August 23, 2016, his wife gave birth to their first child, Robinson.
