= Edward Paredes =

Dominican baseball player (born 1986)

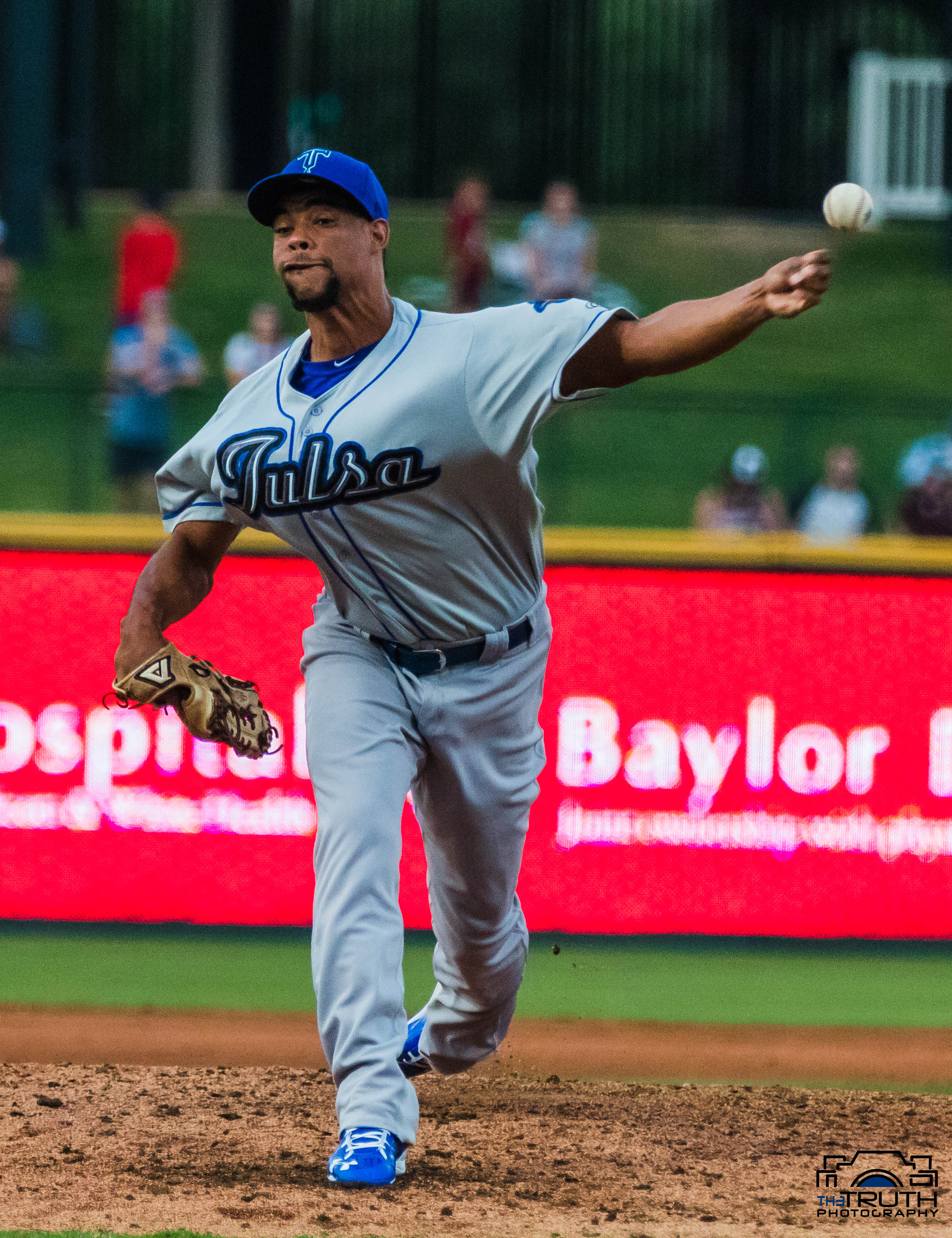
- Paredes pitching in the 2017 Texas League All-Star Game
- Relief pitcher
- Born: September 30, 1986 (age 39); Villa Arriva, Dominican Republic
- Batted: Left Threw: Left

MLB debut
- July 24, 2017, for the Los Angeles Dodgers

Last MLB appearance
- July 8, 2018, for the Los Angeles Dodgers

MLB statistics
- Win–loss record: 3–0
- Earned run average: 4.50
- Strikeouts: 19
- Stats at Baseball Reference

Teams
- Los Angeles Dodgers (2017–2018)

Edward Miguel Paredes Cruz (born September 30, 1986) is a Dominican former professional baseball pitcher. He played in Major League Baseball (MLB) for the Los Angeles Dodgers in 2017 and 2018.

== Career ==
=== Seattle Mariners ===
Paredes was signed as a non-drafted free agent by the Seattle Mariners on May 12, 2005. He played in their farm system through 2011, reaching as high as Triple-A for the Tacoma Rainiers. He was a post-season All Star for the Everett AquaSox of the Northwest League in 2007. He became a free agent after the 2011 season.

=== Cleveland Indians ===
Paredes pitched in the Dominican Winter League in 2011 and 2012, but did not rejoin affiliated baseball until he signed as a minor league free agent by the Cleveland Indians in January 2013. He had an 8.10 ERA in six appearances for the Akron Aeros of the Eastern League before he was released on April 19, 2013.

=== York Revolution ===
He spent the 2014 season with the York Revolution of the Atlantic League of Professional Baseball. He was 3–3 with a 2.70 ERA.

=== Los Angeles Angels ===
On November 20, 2015, Paredes signed a minor league contract with the Los Angeles Angels. He played for the Double–A Arkansas Travelers in 2016, for whom he was 2–2 with 2 saves and a 2.27 ERA with 53 strikeouts over 43 2/3 innings, as he limited batters to a .167 batting average. He was a Mid-Season Texas League All Star. Paredes elected free agency following the season on November 7, 2016.

=== Los Angeles Dodgers ===
Paredes signed with the Detroit Tigers on November 19, 2016, but was selected by the Los Angeles Dodgers in the minor league portion of the Rule 5 draft on December 8. He began the season with the Double–A Tulsa Drillers for whom he was 0–2 with a save and a 2.81 ERA and 45 strikeouts in 32 innings, and was then promoted to the Triple–A Oklahoma City Dodgers, for whom he was 2–1 with an 0.75 ERA and an 0.83 WHIP and 21 strikeouts in 12 innings. He was a Mid-Season Texas League All Star. On July 24, 2017, he was called up to the majors with the Dodgers. He made his major league debut that night against the Minnesota Twins and pitched a scoreless inning to record the win. He appeared in 10 games for the Dodgers in 2017, was 1–0 with a 3.24 ERA, striking out 11 and allowing eight hits and three runs in 8 1/3 innings, with an 0.96 WHIP .

Paredes was designated for assignment on July 11, 2018. He pitched in 15 games for the Dodgers in 2018, was 2–0 with a 5.87 ERA and 8 strikeouts in 7 2/3 innings, and was 3–2 with 2 saves and a 3.79 ERA with 41 strikeouts in 35.2 innings in 36 games for Oklahoma City. Paredes elected free agency on October 15, 2018.

Through 2018, in the minor leagues Paredes was during the course of his career 38–40 with 26 saves and a 4.28 ERA, and averaged 4.4 walks and 8.6 strikeouts per 9 innings. In the major leagues, he was 3–0 with a 4.50 ERA, and averaged 1.1 walks and 10.7 strikeouts per 9 innings.

On January 11, 2019, Paredes signed a minor league contract with the Philadelphia Phillies. He was released by the Phillies organization on March 21. On April 8, Paredes signed a minor league contract to return to the Los Angeles Dodgers. He made 5 appearances for Tulsa, and spent much of the campaign on loan to the Guerreros de Oaxaca of the Mexican League, with whom he compiled a 10.31 ERA and 21 strikeouts over 21 relief outings. Paredes elected free agency following the season on November 4.

=== York Revolution (second stint) ===
On March 3, 2020, Paredes signed with the York Revolution of the Atlantic League of Professional Baseball. He did not play a game for the team because of the cancellation of the ALPB season due to the COVID-19 pandemic and became a free agent after the year.

On April 19, 2021, Paredes re-signed with the Revolution. In 35 appearances for York, he compiled a 1–1 record and 3.38 ERA with 32 strikeouts and one save over 32 innings of work. Paredes became a free agent following the season.

=== Hamilton Cardinals ===
On February 22, 2022, Paredes signed with the Hamilton Cardinals of the Intercounty Baseball League. He became a free agent following the season.
