= 2017 San Francisco Giants season =

2017 San Francisco Giants
- League: National League
- Division: West
- Ballpark: AT&T Park
- City: San Francisco, California
- Record: 64–98 (.395)
- Divisional place: 5th
- Owners: Larry Baer (managing general partner)
- Managers: Bruce Bochy
- Television: KNTV (NBC Bay Area 11) (Jon Miller, Mike Krukow, Duane Kuiper); NBC Sports Bay Area (Duane Kuiper, Mike Krukow, Dave Flemming, Jon Miller, Jeremy Affeldt, Javier López)
- Radio: KNBR (680 AM) (Jon Miller, Dave Flemming, Duane Kuiper, Mike Krukow); KXZM (93.7 FM, Spanish) (Erwin Higueros, Tito Fuentes, Marvin Benard)
- Stats: ESPN.com; Baseball Reference

The 2017 San Francisco Giants season was the Giants' 135th season in Major League Baseball, their Diamond Jubilee in San Francisco since their move from New York following the 1957 season, and their 18th at AT&T Park. They finished in last place in the National League West with a record of 64–98, the worst record in the National League, as well as their worst record as a team since 1985. The Giants tied with the Detroit Tigers for the worst record in MLB.

== Offseason ==
- November 3, 2016 − The Giants exercised the 2017 contract option on LHP Matt Moore.
- December 2, 2016 − The Giants avoid arbitration with RHP Cory Gearrin and IF Ehíré Adríanza, agreeing to one-year deals.
- December 2, 2016 − The Giants tendered the 2017 contracts on RHP George Kontos, IF Conor Gillaspie, 3B Eduardo Núñez and LHP Will Smith.
- December 2, 2016 − The Giants signed RHP Mark Melancon to a four-year, $62 million contract.
- December 7, 2016 − The Giants traded RHP Chris Heston to Seattle Mariners for a player to be named later.
- January 11, 2017 − The Giants avoid arbitration with 3B Conor Gillaspie agreeing to one-year deals.
- January 13, 2017 − The Giants avoid arbitration with LHP Will Smith, RHP George Kontos and 3B Eduardo Núñez agreeing to one-year deals.
- January 23, 2017 − The Giants agreed to terms with Korean infielder Jae-gyun Hwang.
- January 24, 2017 − The Giants signed C Nick Hundley to a one-year deal.

=== Preseason predictions ===
Preseason predictions for the Giants were generally positive. Ahead of spring training, Sports Illustrated ranked the Giants 10th out of 30 teams in their preseason power rankings, saying that if the bullpen improves as expected, "there's enough talent here for the Giants to crash the playoffs yet again, despite a very quiet off-season outside of the Melancon deal". Before the first regular-season game of the year, FanGraphs projected that the Giants would win 88 games, giving the team an 18% chance of winning the division and a 66% chance of making the playoffs.

== Events ==
- April 2, 2017 – LHP Will Smith is placed on the 60-day disabled list after undergoing Tommy John surgery.
- April 11, 2017 – C Buster Posey is placed on the 7-day concussion disabled list after being hit in the head by a pitch from Taijuan Walker.
- April 16, 2017 – OF Jarrett Parker is placed on the 10-day disabled list after breaking his clavicle while crashing into the outfield wall making a catch.
- April 21, 2017 – LHP Madison Bumgarner is placed on the 10-day disabled list for the first time in his career after sustaining rib and shoulder injuries from a dirt bike accident.
- April 24, 2017 – The Giants purchase the contract of top position prospect IF Christian Arroyo and subsequently promote him to the active roster.
- April 26, 2017 – OF Denard Span is placed on the 10-day disabled list.
- April 26, 2017 – OF Jarrett Parker is transferred to the 60-day disabled list.
- April 29, 2017 – SS Brandon Crawford is placed on the 10-day disabled list with a groin injury.
- May 9, 2017 – RHP Mark Melancon is placed on the 10-day disabled list with a forearm injury.
- May 15, 2017 – OF Hunter Pence is placed on the 10-day disabled list with a hamstring injury.
- June 6, 2017 – The Giants acquire RHP Sam Dyson and cash considerations in a trade with the Texas Rangers in exchange for a player to be named later or cash considerations.
- June 6, 2017 – LHP Madison Bumgarner is transferred to the 60-day disabled list.
- June 23, 2017 – 3B Eduardo Núñez is placed on the 10-day disabled list with a hamstring injury.
- July 2, 2017 – The rosters for the 2017 Major League Baseball All-Star Game are announced, with C Buster Posey being named the National League's starter at catcher and to the all-star game for the fifth time.
- July 3, 2017 – The Giants acquire RHP Tyler Herb from the Seattle Mariners in exchange for cash considerations.
- July 25, 2017 – The Giants acquire minor league RHP Shaun Anderson and Gregory Santos from the Boston Red Sox in exchange for IF Eduardo Núñez.
- August 20, 2017 – With six weeks left of the season, the Giants become the first team to be eliminated from a division race, following a 5–2 loss to the Philadelphia Phillies.

== Season standings ==
=== National League West ===
NL West
Team	W	L	Pct.	GB	Home	Road
Los Angeles Dodgers	104	58	.642	—	57‍–‍24	47‍–‍34
Arizona Diamondbacks	93	69	.574	11	52‍–‍29	41‍–‍40
Colorado Rockies	87	75	.537	17	46‍–‍35	41‍–‍40
San Diego Padres	71	91	.438	33	43‍–‍38	28‍–‍53
San Francisco Giants	64	98	.395	40	38‍–‍43	26‍–‍55

=== National League Division Standings ===
Division leaders
Team	W	L	Pct.
Los Angeles Dodgers	104	58	.642
Washington Nationals	97	65	.599
Chicago Cubs	92	70	.568

Wild Card teams (Top 2 teams qualify for postseason)
Team	W	L	Pct.	GB
Arizona Diamondbacks	93	69	.574	+6
Colorado Rockies	87	75	.537	—
Milwaukee Brewers	86	76	.531	1
St. Louis Cardinals	83	79	.512	4
Miami Marlins	77	85	.475	10
Pittsburgh Pirates	75	87	.463	12
Atlanta Braves	72	90	.444	15
San Diego Padres	71	91	.438	16
New York Mets	70	92	.432	17
Cincinnati Reds	68	94	.420	19
Philadelphia Phillies	66	96	.407	21
San Francisco Giants	64	98	.395	23

=== Record vs. opponents ===
2017 National League record Source: MLB Standings Grid – 2017
Team	AZ	ATL	CHC	CIN	COL	LAD	MIA	MIL	NYM	PHI	PIT	SD	SF	STL	WSH	AL
Arizona	—	2–4	3–3	3–3	11–8	11–8	3–4	4–3	6–1	6–1	4–3	11–8	12–7	3–4	2–4	12–8
Atlanta	4–2	—	1–6	3–3	3–4	3–4	11–8	4–2	7–12	6–13	2–5	5–2	4–3	1–5	9–10	9–11
Chicago	3–3	6–1	—	12–7	2–5	2–4	4–3	10–9	4–2	4–3	10–9	2–4	4–3	14–5	3–4	12–8
Cincinnati	3–3	3–3	7–12	—	3–4	0–6	2–5	8–11	3–4	4–2	13–6	3–4	4–3	9–10	1–6	5–15
Colorado	8–11	4–3	5–2	4–3	—	10–9	2–4	4–3	3–3	5–2	3–3	12–7	12–7	2–4	3–4	10–10
Los Angeles	8–11	4–3	4–2	6–0	9–10	—	6–1	3–3	7–0	4–3	6–1	13–6	11–8	4–3	3–3	16–4
Miami	4–3	8–11	3–4	5–2	4–2	1–6	—	2–4	12–7	8–11	3–4	5–1	5–1	2–5	6–13	9–11
Milwaukee	3–4	2–4	9–10	11–8	3–4	3–3	4–2	—	5–2	3–3	9–10	5–2	3–4	11–8	4–3	11–9
New York	1–6	12–7	2–4	4–3	3–3	0–7	7–12	2–5	—	12–7	3–3	3–4	5–1	3–4	6–13	7–13
Philadelphia	1–6	13–6	3–4	2–4	2–5	3–4	11–8	3–3	7–12	—	2–5	1–5	4–3	1–5	8–11	5–15
Pittsburgh	3–4	5–2	9–10	6–13	3–3	1–6	4–3	10–9	3–3	5–2	—	3–3	1–5	8–11	4–3	10–10
San Diego	8–11	2–5	4–2	4–3	7–12	6–13	1–5	2–5	4–3	5–1	3–3	—	12–7	3–4	2–5	8–12
San Francisco	7–12	3–4	3–4	3–4	7–12	8–11	1–5	4–3	1–5	3–4	5–1	7–12	—	3–4	1–5	8–12
St. Louis	4–3	5–1	5–14	10–9	4–2	3–4	5–2	8–11	4–3	5–1	11–8	4–3	4–3	—	3–3	8–12
Washington	4–2	10–9	4–3	6–1	4–3	3–3	13–6	3–4	13–6	11–8	3–4	5–2	5–1	3–3	—	10–10

== Game log and schedule ==
All schedule and scores taken from MLB.com.

Legend
	Giants win
	Giants loss
	Postponement
**Bold**	Giants team member

2017 Game Log: 64–98 (Home: 38–43; Away: 26–55)
April: 10–17 (Home: 7–8; Away: 3–9)

#	Date	Opponent	Score	Win	Loss	Save	Attendance	Record
1	April 2	@ Diamondbacks	5–6	Rodney (1–0)	**Melancon** (0–1)	—	49,016	0–1
2	April 4	@ Diamondbacks	8–4	**Cueto** (1–0)	Corbin (0–1)	—	19,378	1–1
3	April 5	@ Diamondbacks	6–8	Walker (1–0)	**Moore** (0–1)	Rodney (1)	14,675	1–2
4	April 6	@ Diamondbacks	3–9	De La Rosa (1–0)	**Samardzija** (0–1)	—	15,308	1–3
5	April 7	@ Padres	6–7	Torres (1–0)	**Kontos** (0–1)	Maurer (1)	43,441	1–4
6	April 8	@ Padres	1–2	Chacín (1–1)	**Bumgarner** (0–1)	Buchter (1)	42,397	1–5
7	April 9	@ Padres	5–3	**Cueto** (2–0)	Richard (1–1)	**Melancon** (1)	40,537	2–5
8	April 10	Diamondbacks	4–1	**Moore** (1–1)	Walker (1–1)	**Melancon** (2)	42,129	3–5
9	April 11	Diamondbacks	3–4	Ray (1–0)	**Samardzija** (0–2)	Rodney (3)	41,562	3–6
10	April 12	Diamondbacks	6–2	**Cain** (1–0)	Miller (1–1)	—	41,656	4–6
11	April 13	Rockies	1–3	Rusin (1–0)	**Bumgarner** (0–2)	Holland (6)	41,915	4–7
12	April 14	Rockies	8–2	**Cueto** (3–0)	Anderson (1–2)	—	42,738	5–7
13	April 15	Rockies	0–5	Chatwood (1–2)	**Moore** (1–2)	—	42,371	5–8
14	April 16	Rockies	3–4	Senzatela (2–0)	**Samardzija** (0–3)	Holland (7)	41,455	5–9
15	April 18	@ Royals	2–1 (11)	**Law** (1–0)	Alexander (0–1)	**Melancon** (3)	20,863	6–9
16	April 19	@ Royals	0–2	Vargas (3–0)	**Bumgarner** (0–3)	Herrera (3)	24,402	6–10
17	April 21	@ Rockies	5–6	Chatwood (2–2)	**Cueto** (3–1)	Holland (9)	27,663	6–11
18	April 22	@ Rockies	3–12	Senzatela (3–0)	**Moore** (1–3)	—	39,239	6–12
19	April 23	@ Rockies	0–8	Freeland (2–1)	**Samardzija** (0–4)	—	42,011	6–13
20	April 24	Dodgers	2–1	**Cain** (2–0)	Ryu (0–4)	**Melancon** (4)	41,399	7–13
21	April 25	Dodgers	1–2	Kershaw (4–1)	**Blach** (0–1)	Jansen (5)	41,329	7–14
22	April 26	Dodgers	4–3 (10)	**Law** (2–0)	Stripling (0–2)	—	41,573	8–14
23	April 27	Dodgers	1–5 (10)	Jansen (1–0)	**Gearrin** (0–1)	—	41,580	8–15
24	April 28	Padres	4–3	**Law** (3–0)	Buchter (1–1)	**Melancon** (5)	41,436	9–15
25	April 29	Padres	4–12	Chacín (3–3)	**Stratton** (0–1)	—	42,862	9–16
26	April 30	Padres	2–5 (12)	Buchter (2–1)	**Kontos** (0–1)	Torres (1)	41,989	9–17

May: 13–16 (Home: 7–6; Away: 6–10)

#	Date	Opponent	Score	Win	Loss	Save	Attendance	Record
27	May 1	@ Dodgers	4–3	**Cueto** (4–1)	Kershaw (4–2)	**Law** (1)	44,606	10–17
28	May 2	@ Dodgers	5–13	Wood (2–0)	**Moore** (1–4)	—	43,471	10–18
29	May 3	@ Dodgers	4–1 (11)	**Okert** (1–0)	Dayton (1–1)	**Melancon** (6)	50,215	11–18
30	May 5	@ Reds	3–13	Arroyo (3–2)	**Cain** (2–1)	—	22,724	11–19
31	May 6	@ Reds	2–14	Garrett (3–2)	**Blach** (0–2)	Stephenson (1)	20,213	11–20
32	May 7	@ Reds	0–4	Feldman (2–3)	**Cueto** (4–2)	—	21,142	11–21
33	May 8	@ Mets	3–4	Familia (1–0)	**Osich** (0–1)	—	28,453	11–22
34	May 9	@ Mets	1–6	Wheeler (2–2)	**Samardzija** (0–5)	—	29,030	11–23
35	May 10	@ Mets	6–5	**Morris** (1–0)	Familia (1–1)	**Law** (2)	31,066	12–23
36	May 11	Reds	2–3	Peralta (2–0)	**Strickland** (0–1)	Iglesias (7)	41,193	12–24
37	May 12	Reds	3–2 (17)	**Gearrin** (1–1)	Stephenson (0–2)	—	41,325	13–24
38	May 13	Reds	3–1	**Moore** (2–4)	Bonilla (0–1)	**Law** (3)	41,269	14–24
39	May 14	Reds	8–3	**Samardzija** (1–5)	Adleman (2–2)	—	42,122	15–24
40	May 15	Dodgers	8–4	**Cain** (3–1)	McCarthy (3–1)	—	41,397	16–24
41	May 16	Dodgers	2–1	**Blach** (1–2)	Avilán (0–1)	**Law** (4)	41,366	17–24
42	May 17	Dodgers	1–6	Kershaw (7–2)	**Cueto** (4–3)	—	41,588	17–25
43	May 19	@ Cardinals	6–5	**Morris** (2–0)	Oh (1–2)	**Melancon** (7)	44,548	18–25
44	May 20	@ Cardinals	3–1 (13)	**Strickland** (1–1)	Siegrist (0–1)	**Melancon** (8)	45,072	19–25
45	May 21	@ Cardinals	3–8	Wainwright (4–3)	**Cain** (3–2)	—	47,533	19–26
46	May 22	@ Cubs	6–4	**Blach** (2–2)	Lackey (4–4)	**Melancon** (9)	36,204	20–26
47	May 23	@ Cubs	1–4	Lester (3–2)	**Cueto** (4–4)	—	32,905	20–27
48	May 24	@ Cubs	4–5	Hendricks (4–2)	**Moore** (2–5)	Davis (10)	35,617	20–28
49	May 25	@ Cubs	1–5	Butler (2–0)	**Samardzija** (1–6)	Montgomery (1)	37,513	20–29
50	May 26	Braves	0–2	García (2–3)	**Cain** (3–3)	Johnson (10)	41,326	20–30
51	May 27	Braves	6–3	**Blach** (3–2)	Foltynewicz (3–5)	**Melancon** (10)	41,355	21–30
52	May 28	Braves	7–1	**Cueto** (5–4)	Dickey (3–4)	—	42,343	22–30
53	May 29	Nationals	0–3	Roark (5–2)	**Moore** (2–6)	Glover (6)	41,969	22–31
54	May 30	Nationals	3–6	González (4–1)	**Samardzija** (1–7)	Glover (7)	41,266	22–32
55	May 31	Nationals	1–3	Scherzer (6–3)	**Cain** (3–4)	—	41,371	22–33

June: 9–18 (Home: 4–7; Away: 5–11)

#	Date	Opponent	Score	Win	Loss	Save	Attendance	Record
56	June 2	@ Phillies	10–0	**Blach** (4–2)	Eickhoff (0–6)	—	22,491	23–33
57	June 3	@ Phillies	3–5	Lively (1–0)	**Cueto** (5–5)	Gómez (2)	32,413	23–34
58	June 4	@ Phillies	7–9	Neshek (1–1)	**Law** (3–1)	Neris (5)	25,063	23–35
59	June 5	@ Brewers	7–2	**Samardzija** (2–7)	Scahill (1–2)	—	21,452	24–35
60	June 6	@ Brewers	2–5	Anderson (5–1)	**Cain** (3–5)	Knebel (6)	21,214	24–36
61	June 7	@ Brewers	3–6	Nelson (4–3)	**Blach** (4–3)	Knebel (7)	20,580	24–37
62	June 8	@ Brewers	9–5 (10)	**Melancon** (1–1)	Barnes (1–1)	—	23,005	25–37
63	June 9	Twins	0–4	Santana (8–3)	**Moore** (2–7)	—	41,046	25–38
64	June 10	Twins	2–3	Berríos (5–1)	**Samardzija** (2–8)	Kintzler (17)	41,255	25–39
65	June 11	Twins	13–8	**Osich** (1–1)	Belisle (0–1)	—	41,321	26–39
66	June 13	Royals	1–8	Vargas (9–3)	**Blach** (4–4)	—	41,284	26–40
67	June 14	Royals	2–7	Hammel (3–6)	**Cueto** (5–6)	—	41,144	26–41
68	June 15	@ Rockies	9–10	Holland (1–0)	**Strickland** (1–2)	—	40,747	26–42
69	June 16	@ Rockies	8–10	Senzatela (9–2)	**Samardzija** (2–9)	Holland (24)	46,632	26–43
70	June 17	@ Rockies	1–5	Freeland (8–4)	**Cain** (3–6)	—	48,035	26–44
71	June 18	@ Rockies	5–7	Estévez (4–0)	**Melancon** (1–2)	—	48,341	26–45
72	June 19	@ Braves	0–9	Dickey (5–5)	**Cueto** (5–7)	—	24,723	26–46
73	June 20	@ Braves	6–3	**Moore** (3–7)	Teherán (6–5)	**Melancon** (11)	23,823	27–46
74	June 21	@ Braves	3–5 (11)	Jackson (2–0)	**Gearrin** (1–2)	—	25,771	27–47
75	June 22	@ Braves	11–12	Hursh (1–0)	**Cain** (3–7)	Johnson (14)	25,521	27–48
76	June 23	Mets	4–11	Lugo (2–1)	**Blach** (4–5)	—	41,769	27–49
77	June 24	Mets	2–5	deGrom (7–3)	**Dyson** (0–1)	—	41,216	27–50
78	June 25	Mets	2–8	Montero (1–4)	**Moore** (3–8)	—	41,137	27–51
79	June 26	Rockies	9–2	**Samardzija** (3–9)	Márquez (5–4)	—	41,388	28–51
80	June 27	Rockies	4–3 (14)	**Gearrin** (2–2)	Qualls (1–1)	—	41,331	29–51
81	June 28	Rockies	5–3	**Blach** (5–5)	Freeland (8–6)	**Strickland** (1)	41,286	30–51
82	June 30	@ Pirates	13–5	**Cueto** (6–7)	Cole (6–7)	—	26,407	31–51

July: 9–16 (Home: 5–8; Away: 4–8)

#	Date	Opponent	Score	Win	Loss	Save	Attendance	Record
83	July 1	@ Pirates	2–1 (11)	**Osich** (2–1)	Hudson (1–4)	**Dyson** (1)	27,247	32–51
84	July 2	@ Pirates	5–3	**Samardzija** (4–9)	Watson (4–2)	**Dyson** (2)	32,144	33–51
85	July 4	@ Tigers	3–5	Fulmer (8–6)	**Cain** (3–8)	Wilson (9)	32,514	33–52
86	July 5	@ Tigers	5–4	**Blach** (6–5)	Norris (4–7)	**Dyson** (3)	26,631	34–52
87	July 6	@ Tigers	2–6	Sánchez (1–0)	**Stratton** (0–2)	—	27,210	34–53
88	July 7	Marlins	1–6	Straily (7–4)	**Moore** (3–9)	—	41,510	34–54
89	July 8	Marlins	4–5	O'Grady (1–0)	**Samardzija** (4–10)	Ramos (16)	41,480	34–55
90	July 9	Marlins	8–10 (11)	Wittgren (2–1)	**Kontos** (0–3)	Ramos (17)	41,516	34–56
–	July 11	**88th All-Star Game in Miami, Florida**						
91	July 14	@ Padres	5–4	**Gearrin** (3–2)	Richard (5–9)	**Dyson** (4)	34,970	35–56
92	July 15	@ Padres	3–5	Maurer (1–4)	**Gearrin** (3–3)	—	36,266	35–57
93	July 16	@ Padres	1–7	Cahill (4–3)	**Samardzija** (4–11)	—	30,561	35–58
94	July 17	Indians	3–5	Tomlin (6–9)	**Moore** (3–10)	Allen (17)	39,538	35–59
95	July 18	Indians	2–1 (10)	**Dyson** (1–1)	Allen (0–5)	—	39,151	36–59
96	July 19	Indians	5–4	**Gearrin** (4–3)	Shaw (2–4)	**Dyson** (5)	41,067	37–59
97	July 20	Padres	2–5	Chacín (9–7)	**Bumgarner** (0–4)	Maurer (20)	41,166	37–60
98	July 21	Padres	9–12 (11)	Maton (2–0)	**Kontos** (0–4)	—	41,145	37–61
99	July 22	Padres	5–4 (12)	**Osich** (3–1)	Quackenbush (0–2)	—	40,936	38–61
100	July 23	Padres	2–5	Lamet (4–4)	**Blach** (6–6)	Hand (3)	41,372	38–62
101	July 24	Pirates	3–10	Cole (8–7)	**Cain** (3–9)	—	40,030	38–63
102	July 25	Pirates	11–3	**Bumgarner** (1–4)	Taillon (6–4)	**Stratton** (1)	41,232	39–63
103	July 26	Pirates	2–1	**Samardzija** (5–11)	Watson (5–3)	**Dyson** (6)	41,038	40–63
104	July 28	@ Dodgers	4–6	Wood (12–1)	**Kontos** (0–5)	Jansen (26)	51,426	40–64
105	July 29	@ Dodgers	1–2	Hill (8–4)	**Blach** (6–7)	Jansen (27)	47,792	40–65
106	July 30	@ Dodgers	2–3 (11)	Báez (3–1)	**Suárez** (0–1)	—	53,495	40–66
107	July 31	@ Athletics	5–8	Blackburn (2–1)	**Osich** (3–2)	Treinen (1)	38,391	40–67

August: 13–16 (Home: 9–7; Away: 4–9)

#	Date	Opponent	Score	Win	Loss	Save	Attendance	Record
108	August 1	@ Athletics	10–4	**Samardzija** (6–11)	Manaea (8–6)	—	38,871	41–67
109	August 2	Athletics	1–6	Gossett (3–6)	**Moore** (3–11)	—	40,635	41–68
110	August 3	Athletics	11–2	**Blach** (7–7)	Graveman (2–3)	—	39,883	42–68
111	August 4	Diamondbacks	1–2	Banda (1–1)	**Bumgarner** (1–5)	Rodney (25)	38,967	42–69
112	August 5	Diamondbacks	5–4 (10)	**Strickland** (2–2)	McFarland (4–4)	—	39,532	43–69
113	August 6	Diamondbacks	6–3	**Samardzija** (7–11)	Corbin (8–11)	**Suárez** (1)	40,107	44–69
114	August 7	Cubs	3–5	Arrieta (11–8)	**Moore** (3–12)	Davis (24)	40,462	44–70
115	August 8	Cubs	6–3	**Blach** (8–7)	Quintana (2–2)	**Dyson** (7)	39,864	45–70
116	August 9	Cubs	3–1	**Bumgarner** (2–5)	Duensing (0–1)	**Dyson** (8)	41,099	46–70
–	August 11	@ Nationals	Postponed (rain); Rescheduled for August 13 as part of a doubleheader.					
117	August 12	@ Nationals	1–3	Jackson (3–2)	**Samardzija** (7–12)	Doolittle (8)	32,344	46–71
118	August 13 (1)	@ Nationals	4–2	**Stratton** (1–2)	Cole (1–3)	**Dyson** (9)	30,866	47–71
119	August 13 (2)	@ Nationals	2–6 (11)	Albers (6–2)	**Suárez** (0–2)	—	29,085	47–72
120	August 14	@ Marlins	3–8	Conley (5–5)	**Blach** (8–8)	—	17,096	47–73
121	August 15	@ Marlins	9–4	**Bumgarner** (3–5)	Tazawa (2–3)	—	21,694	48–73
122	August 16	@ Marlins	1–8	Ureña (11–5)	**Cain** (3–10)	—	17,102	48–74
123	August 17	Phillies	5–4	**Samardzija** (8–12)	Nola (9–8)	**Dyson** (10)	41,279	49–74
124	August 18	Phillies	10–2	**Moore** (4–12)	Eflin (1–5)	—	39,487	50–74
125	August 19	Phillies	9–12	Morgan (1–1)	**Osich** (3–3)	Neris (14)	40,719	50–75
126	August 20	Phillies	2–5	Morgan (2–1)	**Strickland** (2–3)	Neris (15)	39,921	50–76
127	August 21	Brewers	2–0	**Stratton** (2–2)	Davies (14–7)	**Dyson** (11)	39,341	51–76
128	August 22	Brewers	3–4	Jeffress (1–0)	**Suárez** (0–3)	Knebel (27)	39,523	51–77
129	August 23	Brewers	4–2	**Strickland** (3–3)	Barnes (3–4)	**Dyson** (12)	40,015	52–77
130	August 25	@ Diamondbacks	3–4	Greinke (15–6)	**Blach** (8–10)	Rodney (31)	31,924	52–78
131	August 26	@ Diamondbacks	1–2	Walker (7–7)	**Bumgarner** (3–6)	Rodney (32)	25,709	52–79
132	August 27	@ Diamondbacks	0–11	Corbin (12–11)	**Stratton** (2–3)	—	23,210	52–80
133	August 28	@ Padres	3–0	**Samardzija** (9–12)	Chacín (11–10)	—	20,594	53–80
134	August 29	@ Padres	3–6	Perdomo (7–8)	**Moore** (4–13)	Hand (13)	19,631	53–81
135	August 30	@ Padres	0–5	Stammen (2–2)	**Blach** (8–11)	Hand (14)	19,691	53–82
136	August 31	Cardinals	2–5	Wacha (10–7)	**Cain** (3–11)	Oh (20)	40,783	53–83

September/October: 11–15 (Home: 7–7; Away: 4–8)

#	Date	Opponent	Score	Win	Loss	Save	Attendance	Record
137	September 1	Cardinals	6–11	Lyons (3–0)	**Dyson** (1–2)	—	37,797	53–84
138	September 2	Cardinals	2–1 (10)	**Dyson** (2–2)	Sherriff (0–1)	—	39,513	54–84
139	September 3	Cardinals	3–7	Weaver (4–1)	**Bumgarner** (3–7)	—	39,784	54–85
140	September 4	@ Rockies	3–4	Holland (3–5)	**Okert** (1–1)	—	28,300	54–86
141	September 5	@ Rockies	6–9	Rusin (4–0)	**Blach** (8–12)	Holland (37)	24,245	54–87
142	September 6	@ Rockies	11–3	**Cueto** (7–7)	Freeland (11–10)	—	26,674	55–87
143	September 8	@ White Sox	9–2	**Moore** (5–13)	Giolito (2–2)	—	16,852	56–87
144	September 9	@ White Sox	1–13	Shields (3–6)	**Samardzija** (9–13)	—	17,688	56–88
145	September 10	@ White Sox	1–8	Fulmer (2–1)	**Bumgarner** (3–8)	—	16,458	56–89
146	September 11	Dodgers	8–6	**Law** (4–1)	Báez (3–5)	**Dyson** (13)	40,409	57–89
147	September 12	Dodgers	3–5	Kershaw (17–3)	**Cueto** (7–8)	Jansen (37)	38,727	57–90
148	September 13	Dodgers	1–4	Darvish (3–3)	**Moore** (5–14)	—	38,866	57–91
149	September 15	Diamondbacks	2–3	Ray (14–5)	**Samardzija** (9–14)	Rodney (37)	39,810	57–92
150	September 16	Diamondbacks	0–2	Greinke (17–6)	**Bumgarner** (3–9)	Rodney (38)	37,846	57–93
151	September 17	Diamondbacks	7–2	**Stratton** (3–3)	Walker (9–8)	—	38,476	58–93
152	September 19	Rockies	4–3	**Dyson** (3–2)	Rusin (5–1)	—	40,686	59–93
153	September 20	Rockies	4–0	**Moore** (6–14)	Chatwood (8–13)	—	39,775	60–93
154	September 22	@ Dodgers	2–4	Hill (5–1)	**Samardzija** (9–15)	Jansen (40)	51,159	60–94
155	September 23	@ Dodgers	2–1	**Bumgarner** (4–9)	Ryu (5–8)	**Dyson** (14)	51,093	61–94
156	September 24	@ Dodgers	1–3	Kershaw (18–4)	**Stratton** (3–4)	Morrow (2)	46,774	61–95
157	September 25	@ Diamondbacks	9–2	**Cueto** (8–8)	Godley (8–9)	—	22,813	62–95
158	September 26	@ Diamondbacks	4–11	Ray (15–5)	**Moore** (6–15)	—	27,487	62–96
159	September 27	@ Diamondbacks	3–4	Hoover (3–1)	**Dyson** (3–3)	—	20,048	62–97
160	September 29	Padres	8–0	**Stratton** (4–4)	Lyles (1–5)	—	39,863	63–97
161	September 30	Padres	2–3	Baumann (2–1)	**Dyson** (3–4)	Hand (21)	40,394	63–98
162	October 1	Padres	5–4	**Strickland** (3–3)	Maton (3–2)	—	38,847	64–98

== Roster ==
2017 San Francisco Giants
Roster
Pitchers: 50 Ty Blach; 40 Madison Bumgarner; 18 Matt Cain; 59 Kyle Crick; 47 Johnny Cueto; 49 Sam Dyson; 62 Cory Gearrin; 67 Roberto Goméz; 70 George Kontos; 64 Derek Law; 41 Mark Melancon; 45 Matt Moore; 54 Reyes Moronta; 57 Bryan Morris; 32,48 Steven Okert; 61 Josh Osich; 59 Neil Ramirez; 29 Jeff Samardzija; 57 Dan Slania; 34 Chris Stratton; 60 Hunter Strickland; 56 Albert Suárez	Catchers: 43 Tim Federowicz; 5 Nick Hundley; 28 Buster Posey; Infielders: 22 Christian Arroyo; 9 Brandon Belt; 35 Brandon Crawford; 21 Conor Gillaspie; 52 Miguel Gómez; 7 Aaron Hill; 1 Jae-gyun Hwang; 8,63 Ryder Jones; 38,40 Mike Morse; 10 Eduardo Núñez; 12 Joe Panik; 48 Pablo Sandoval; 37 Kelby Tomlinson	Outfielders: 46 Orlando Calixte; 66 Gorkys Hernández; 49 Chris Marrero; 39 Carlos Moncrief; 6 Jarrett Parker; 8 Hunter Pence; 39 Justin Ruggiano; 53 Austin Slater; 2 Denard Span; 46 Drew Stubbs; 51 Mac Williamson	Manager: 15 Bruce Bochy; Coaches: 17 José Alguacil (first base); -- Chad Chop (special assistant); 33 Steve Decker (assistant hitting); -- Shawon Dunston (special assistant); 26 Mark Gardner (bullpen); 31 Hensley Meulens (hitting); 16 Phil Nevin (third base); 19 Dave Righetti (pitching); 99 Taira Uematsu (bullpen catcher); 88 Eli Whiteside (bullpen catcher); 23 Ron Wotus (bench)

== Statistics ==
=== Batting ===
Note: G = Games played; AB = At bats; R = Runs scored; H = Hits; 2B = Doubles; 3B = Triples; HR = Home runs; RBI = Runs batted in; BB = Base on balls; SO = Strikeouts; AVG = Batting average; OPS = On base plus slugging percentage; SB = Stolen bases

Player	G	AB	R	H	2B	3B	HR	RBI	BB	SO	AVG	OPS	SB
Christian Arroyo, 3B	34	125	9	24	5	0	3	14	8	32	.192	.548	1
Brandon Belt, 1B	104	392	63	92	27	3	18	51	66	104	.241	.823	3
Ty Blach, P	38	44	5	10	2	0	1	7	4	21	.227	.627	0
Madison Bumgarner, P	17	34	4	7	0	0	3	5	2	11	.206	.721	0
Matt Cain, P	27	32	1	5	2	0	0	2	0	20	.156	.375	0
Orlando Calixte, IF	29	49	5	7	1	0	0	6	3	16	.143	.348	1
Brandon Crawford, SS	144	518	58	131	34	1	14	77	42	113	.253	.709	3
Johnny Cueto, P	25	46	3	4	0	0	0	3	1	15	.087	.191	0
Tim Federowicz, C	13	13	3	3	0	0	2	3	1	4	.231	.978	0
Cory Gearrin, 3B	68	2	0	0	0	0	0	0	0	2	.000	.000	0
Conor Gillaspie, 3B	44	80	8	13	4	0	2	8	5	10	.163	.506	0
Miguel Gómez, 2B	22	33	3	8	2	0	0	2	0	6	.242	.538	0
Gorkys Hernández, OF	128	310	40	79	20	1	0	22	31	73	.255	.652	12
Aaron Hill, IF	34	68	7	9	2	1	1	7	11	13	.132	.485	0
Nick Hundley, C	101	287	27	70	23	0	9	35	12	81	.244	.691	0
Jae-gyun Hwang, IF	18	52	2	8	1	0	1	5	5	15	.154	.459	0
Ryder Jones, IF	53	150	12	26	5	2	2	5	10	52	.173	.517	1
George Kontos, P	50	2	0	0	0	0	0	0	0	1	.000	.000	0
Chris Marrero, LF	15	38	2	5	0	0	1	5	2	9	.132	.381	0
Carlos Moncrief, RF	28	38	4	8	1	0	0	5	3	15	.211	.493	0
Matt Moore, P	32	47	3	6	0	0	0	4	2	19	.128	.291	0
Michael Morse, 1B	24	36	1	7	1	0	1	3	3	14	.194	.556	0
Eduardo Núñez, 3B	76	302	37	93	21	0	4	31	12	29	.308	.752	18
Steven Okert, P	44	1	0	0	0	0	0	0	0	1	.000	.000	0
Joe Panik, 2B	138	511	60	147	28	5	10	53	46	54	.288	.768	4
Jarrett Parker, LF	51	166	14	41	12	2	4	23	10	54	.247	.709	2
Hunter Pence, RF	134	493	55	128	13	5	13	67	40	102	.260	.701	2
Buster Posey, C	140	494	62	158	34	0	12	67	61	66	.320	.861	6
Justin Ruggiano, OF	19	60	2	13	1	0	2	4	1	17	.217	.571	1
Jeff Samardzija, P	35	64	3	6	2	0	1	2	0	25	.094	.266	0
Pablo Sandoval, 3B	47	160	17	36	9	0	5	20	8	29	.225	.638	0
Austin Slater, LF	34	117	15	33	3	1	3	16	8	29	.282	.740	0
Denard Span, CF	129	497	73	135	31	5	12	43	40	69	.272	.756	12
Chris Stratton, P	13	14	1	2	0	0	0	0	0	3	.143	.286	0
Drew Stubbs, CF	10	22	0	2	0	0	0	0	2	9	.091	.258	0
Albert Suárez, P	18	2	0	0	0	0	0	0	0	0	.000	.000	0
Kelby Tomlinson, IF	104	194	32	50	4	2	1	11	23	46	.258	.646	9
Mac Williamson, OF	28	68	8	16	2	0	3	6	5	25	.235	.685	1
Team totals	162	5551	639	1382	290	28	128	612	467	1204	.249	.689	76

=== Pitching ===
Note: W = Wins; L = Losses; ERA = Earned run average; G = Games pitched; GS = Games started; SV = Saves; IP = Innings pitched; H = Hits allowed; R = Runs allowed; ER = Earned runs allowed; HR = Home runs allowed; BB = Walks allowed; K = Strikeouts

Player	W	L	ERA	G	GS	SV	IP	H	R	ER	HR	BB	K
Ty Blach	8	12	4.78	34	24	0	163.2	179	91	87	17	43	73
Madison Bumgarner	4	9	3.32	17	17	0	111.0	101	41	41	17	20	101
Matt Cain	3	11	5.43	27	23	0	124.1	157	85	75	18	49	75
Kyle Crick	0	0	3.06	30	0	0	32.1	22	13	11	2	17	28
Johnny Cueto	8	8	4.52	25	25	0	147.1	160	77	74	22	53	136
Sam Dyson	3	4	4.03	38	0	14	38.0	36	18	17	2	18	27
Cory Gearrin	4	3	1.99	68	0	0	68.0	50	16	15	4	35	64
Roberto Goméz	0	0	8.44	4	0	0	5.1	9	5	5	0	1	6
George Kontos	0	5	3.83	50	0	0	51.2	52	24	22	8	17	55
Derek Law	4	1	5.06	41	0	4	37.1	45	21	21	5	14	35
Mark Melancon	1	2	4.50	32	0	11	30.0	37	16	15	3	6	29
Matt Moore	6	15	5.52	32	31	0	174.1	200	116	107	27	67	148
Reyes Moronta	0	0	2.70	4	0	0	6.2	6	2	2	1	3	11
Bryan Morris	2	0	6.43	20	0	0	21.0	24	16	15	1	11	15
Steven Okert	1	1	5.67	44	0	0	27.0	24	18	17	3	11	22
Josh Osich	3	2	6.23	54	0	0	43.1	48	32	30	7	27	43
Neil Ramirez	0	0	8.71	9	0	0	10.1	15	15	10	2	4	18
Jeff Samardzija	9	15	4.42	32	32	0	207.2	204	107	102	30	32	205
Dan Slania	0	0	0.00	1	0	0	1.0	0	0	0	0	0	0
Chris Stratton	4	4	3.68	13	10	1	58.2	59	25	24	5	28	51
Hunter Strickland	4	3	2.64	68	9	1	61.1	59	20	18	4	29	58
Albert Suárez	0	3	5.12	18	0	1	31.2	28	18	18	4	11	34
Team totals	64	98	4.50	162	162	32	1452.0	1515	776	726	182	496	1234

== Awards ==
Buster Posey won his fourth Silver Slugger Award as the best hitting catcher in the National League.

== Farm system ==
Level	Team	League	Manager
AAA	Sacramento River Cats	Pacific Coast League	Dave Brundage
AA	Richmond Flying Squirrels	Eastern League	Kyle Haines
A-Advanced	San Jose Giants	California League	Nestor Rojas
A	Augusta GreenJackets	South Atlantic League	Carlos Valderrama
A-Short Season	Salem-Keizer Volcanoes	Northwest League	Jolbert Cabrera
Rookie	AZL Giants	Arizona League	Hector Borg
Rookie	DSL Giants	Dominican Summer League	
