= 2017 Arizona Diamondbacks season =

2017 Arizona Diamondbacks
- National League Wild Card winners
- League: National League
- Division: West
- Ballpark: Chase Field
- City: Phoenix, Arizona
- Record: 93–69 (.574)
- Divisional place: 2nd
- Owners: Ken Kendrick
- General managers: Mike Hazen
- Managers: Torey Lovullo
- Television: Fox Sports Arizona (Steve Berthiaume, Bob Brenly, Greg Schulte)
- Radio: KMVP-FM (98.7) (Greg Schulte, Tom Candiotti, Mike Ferrin); KSUN (Spanish)
- Stats: ESPN.com; Baseball Reference

The 2017 Arizona Diamondbacks season was the franchise's 19th season in Major League Baseball and their 19th season at Chase Field and in Phoenix, Arizona. They began the season on April 2 at home against the San Francisco Giants. The Diamondbacks finished the season 93–69 to finish in second place in the National League West, 11 games behind the Los Angeles Dodgers. They also flipped their record from the previous year, in which they went 69–93.

On September 24, the Diamondbacks clinched a Wild Card berth with losses by the Milwaukee Brewers and the St. Louis Cardinals. They also clinched home field for the Wild Card game after a 3–2 walk-off victory over the Miami Marlins. This marked the first trip to the playoffs for the Diamondbacks since 2011. In the NLWC Game, they defeated the Colorado Rockies to advance the NLDS against the division rival Los Angeles Dodgers. The Diamondbacks were then swept by the Dodgers in three games, ending their postseason run.

== Offseason and spring training ==
During their pre-season spring training, the Diamondbacks participated in the Cactus League, finishing with a 15–15 win–loss record. They also played two tied games that were not included in the standings.

== Regular season ==
Facing the Los Angeles Dodgers on September 4, Diamondbacks outfielder J. D. Martinez became the 18th player in MLB history to hit four home runs in a game. This performance meant that the Diamondbacks became the first team ever to have had a 20-strikeout game in nine innings (Randy Johnson, 2001), a perfect game (Johnson again, 2004) and a four-homer game (Martinez).

=== Season standings ===
==== National League West ====
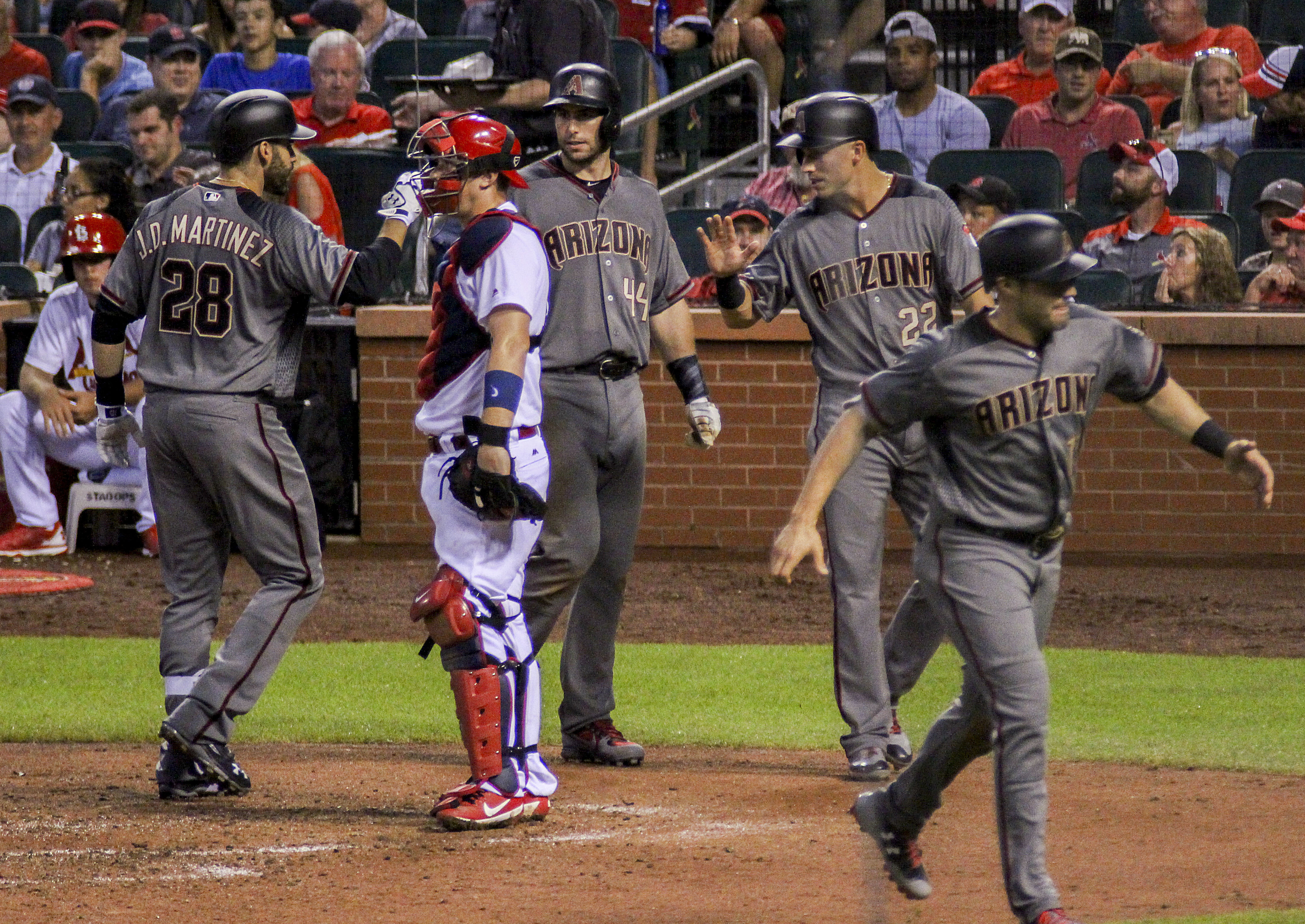
J. D. Martinez is greeted at home after hitting a grand slam in St. Louis, July 27, 2017. Cardinal catcher Carson Kelly looks on.

NL West
Team	W	L	Pct.	GB	Home	Road
Los Angeles Dodgers	104	58	.642	—	57‍–‍24	47‍–‍34
Arizona Diamondbacks	93	69	.574	11	52‍–‍29	41‍–‍40
Colorado Rockies	87	75	.537	17	46‍–‍35	41‍–‍40
San Diego Padres	71	91	.438	33	43‍–‍38	28‍–‍53
San Francisco Giants	64	98	.395	40	38‍–‍43	26‍–‍55

==== National League Wild Card ====
Division leaders
Team	W	L	Pct.
Los Angeles Dodgers	104	58	.642
Washington Nationals	97	65	.599
Chicago Cubs	92	70	.568

Wild Card teams (Top 2 teams qualify for postseason)
Team	W	L	Pct.	GB
Arizona Diamondbacks	93	69	.574	+6
Colorado Rockies	87	75	.537	—
Milwaukee Brewers	86	76	.531	1
St. Louis Cardinals	83	79	.512	4
Miami Marlins	77	85	.475	10
Pittsburgh Pirates	75	87	.463	12
Atlanta Braves	72	90	.444	15
San Diego Padres	71	91	.438	16
New York Mets	70	92	.432	17
Cincinnati Reds	68	94	.420	19
Philadelphia Phillies	66	96	.407	21
San Francisco Giants	64	98	.395	23

==== Record vs. opponents ====
2017 National League record Source: MLB Standings Grid – 2017
Team	AZ	ATL	CHC	CIN	COL	LAD	MIA	MIL	NYM	PHI	PIT	SD	SF	STL	WSH	AL
Arizona	—	2–4	3–3	3–3	11–8	11–8	3–4	4–3	6–1	6–1	4–3	11–8	12–7	3–4	2–4	12–8
Atlanta	4–2	—	1–6	3–3	3–4	3–4	11–8	4–2	7–12	6–13	2–5	5–2	4–3	1–5	9–10	9–11
Chicago	3–3	6–1	—	12–7	2–5	2–4	4–3	10–9	4–2	4–3	10–9	2–4	4–3	14–5	3–4	12–8
Cincinnati	3–3	3–3	7–12	—	3–4	0–6	2–5	8–11	3–4	4–2	13–6	3–4	4–3	9–10	1–6	5–15
Colorado	8–11	4–3	5–2	4–3	—	10–9	2–4	4–3	3–3	5–2	3–3	12–7	12–7	2–4	3–4	10–10
Los Angeles	8–11	4–3	4–2	6–0	9–10	—	6–1	3–3	7–0	4–3	6–1	13–6	11–8	4–3	3–3	16–4
Miami	4–3	8–11	3–4	5–2	4–2	1–6	—	2–4	12–7	8–11	3–4	5–1	5–1	2–5	6–13	9–11
Milwaukee	3–4	2–4	9–10	11–8	3–4	3–3	4–2	—	5–2	3–3	9–10	5–2	3–4	11–8	4–3	11–9
New York	1–6	12–7	2–4	4–3	3–3	0–7	7–12	2–5	—	12–7	3–3	3–4	5–1	3–4	6–13	7–13
Philadelphia	1–6	13–6	3–4	2–4	2–5	3–4	11–8	3–3	7–12	—	2–5	1–5	4–3	1–5	8–11	5–15
Pittsburgh	3–4	5–2	9–10	6–13	3–3	1–6	4–3	10–9	3–3	5–2	—	3–3	1–5	8–11	4–3	10–10
San Diego	8–11	2–5	4–2	4–3	7–12	6–13	1–5	2–5	4–3	5–1	3–3	—	12–7	3–4	2–5	8–12
San Francisco	7–12	3–4	3–4	3–4	7–12	8–11	1–5	4–3	1–5	3–4	5–1	7–12	—	3–4	1–5	8–12
St. Louis	4–3	5–1	5–14	10–9	4–2	3–4	5–2	8–11	4–3	5–1	11–8	4–3	4–3	—	3–3	8–12
Washington	4–2	10–9	4–3	6–1	4–3	3–3	13–6	3–4	13–6	11–8	3–4	5–2	5–1	3–3	—	10–10

=== Game log ===
2017 Game Log 93–69 (Home: 52–29; Away: 41–40)
April: 16–11 (Home: 12–5; Away: 4–6)

#	Date	Opponent	Score	Win	Loss	Save	Attendance	Record	Streak
1	April 2	Giants	6–5	**Rodney** (1–0)	Melancon (0–1)	—	49,016	1–0	W1
2	April 4	Giants	4–8	Cueto (1–0)	**Corbin** (0–1)	—	19,378	1–1	L1
3	April 5	Giants	8–6	**Walker** (1–0)	Moore (0–1)	**Rodney** (1)	14,675	2–1	W1
4	April 6	Giants	9–3	**De La Rosa** (1–0)	Samardzija (0–1)	—	15,308	3–1	W2
5	April 7	Indians	7–3	**Miller** (1–0)	Tomlin (0–1)	—	22,443	4–1	W3
6	April 8	Indians	11–2	**Greinke** (1–0)	Bauer (0–1)	—	28,437	5–1	W4
7	April 9	Indians	3–2	**Corbin** (1–1)	Kluber (0–1)	**Rodney** (2)	30,191	6–1	W5
8	April 10	@ Giants	1–4	Moore (1–1)	**Walker** (1–1)	—	42,129	6–2	L1
9	April 11	@ Giants	4–3	**Ray** (1–0)	Samardzija (0–2)	**Rodney** (3)	41,562	7–2	W1
10	April 12	@ Giants	2–6	Cain (1–0)	**Miller** (1–1)	—	41,656	7–3	L1
11	April 14	@ Dodgers	1–7	Kershaw (2–1)	**Greinke** (1–1)	—	49,438	7–4	L2
12	April 15	@ Dodgers	4–8	Wood (1–0)	**Corbin** (1–2)	Jansen (3)	48,070	7–5	L3
13	April 16	@ Dodgers	3–1	**Walker** (2–1)	Hill (1–1)	**Rodney** (4)	39,822	8–5	W1
14	April 17	@ Dodgers	4–2	**Hoover** (1–0)	Hatcher (0–1)	**Rodney** (5)	35,448	9–5	W2
15	April 18	@ Padres	11–2	**Miller** (2–1)	Cosart (0–1)	—	19,869	10–5	W3
16	April 19	@ Padres	0–1	Chacín (2–2)	**Greinke** (1–2)	Maurer (2)	17,089	10–6	L1
17	April 20	@ Padres	1–4	Richard (2–2)	**Corbin** (2–2)	Maurer (3)	17,831	10–7	L2
18	April 21	Dodgers	13–5	**Bradley** (1–0)	Stripling (0–1)	—	27,018	11–7	W1
19	April 22	Dodgers	11–5	**Ray** (2–0)	Maeda (1–2)	—	36,294	12–7	W2
20	April 23	Dodgers	2–6	McCarthy (3–0)	**Miller** (2–2)	—	28,704	12–8	L1
21	April 24	Padres	7–6	**Greinke** (2–2)	Chacín (2–3)	**Rodney** (6)	14,758	13–8	W1
22	April 25	Padres	9–3	**Corbin** (3–2)	Richard (2–3)	—	17,531	14–8	W2
23	April 26	Padres	5–8	Buchter (1–0)	**Rodney** (1–1)	Maurer (4)	12,215	14–9	L1
24	April 27	Padres	6–2	**Walker** (3–1)	Weaver (0–2)	—	15,452	15–9	W1
25	April 28	Rockies	1–3	Freeland (3–1)	**Ray** (2–1)	Holland (10)	19,300	15–10	L1
26	April 29	Rockies	6–7	Estévez (3–0)	**Rodney** (1–2)	Holland (11)	30,445	15–11	L2
27	April 30	Rockies	2–0 (13)	**Delgado** (1–0)	Lyles (0–1)	—	23,613	16–11	W1

May: 17–11 (Home: 9–3; Away: 8–8)

#	Date	Opponent	Score	Win	Loss	Save	Attendance	Record	Streak
28	May 2	@ Nationals	6–3	**McFarland** (1–0)	Roark (3–1)	**Rodney** (7)	22,826	17–11	W2
29	May 3	@ Nationals	1–2	Turner (1–0)	**Ray** (2–2)	—	23,816	17–12	L1
30	May 4	@ Nationals	2–4	Scherzer (4–2)	**Shipley** (0–1)	Romero (1)	29,496	17–13	L2
31	May 5	@ Rockies	6–3	**Greinke** (3–2)	Márquez (0–2)	Rodney (8)	30,030	18–13	W1
32	May 6	@ Rockies	1–9	Anderson (2–3)	**Corbin** (2–4)	—	36,165	18–14	L1
33	May 7	@ Rockies	2–5	Chatwood (3–4)	**Walker** (3–2)	Holland (13)	39,175	18–15	L2
34	May 9	Tigers	3–7	Verlander (3–2)	**Ray** (3–2)	—	20,445	18–16	L3
35	May 10	Tigers	7–1	**Godley** (1–0)	Boyd(3–2)	—	18,897	19–16	W1
36	May 11	Pirates	2–1	**Greinke** (4–2)	Cole (1–4)	Rodney (9)	17,527	20–16	W2
37	May 12	Pirates	11–4	**Corbin** (3–4)	Glasnow (1–3)	—	21,911	21–16	W3
38	May 13	Pirates	3–4	Williams (1–2)	**Walker** (3–3)	Watson (8)	31,673	21–17	L1
39	May 14	Pirates	4–6	Watson (2–0)	**Wilhelmsen** (0–1)	—	34,088	21–18	L2
40	May 15	Mets	7–3	**De La Rosa** (2–0)	Robles (4–1)	—	15,988	22–18	W1
41	May 16	Mets	5–4	**Greinke**(5–2)	Milone (1–1)	Rodney (10)	17,471	23–18	W2
42	May 17	Mets	5–4	**Wilhelmsen** (1–1)	Montero (0–3)	—	19,842	24–18	W3
43	May 19	@ Padres	10–1	**Walker** (4–3)	Weaver (0–5)	**Delgado** (1)	22,187	25–18	W4
44	May 20	@ Padres	9–1	**Ray** (3–3)	Perdomo (0–1)	—	29,969	26–18	W5
45	May 21	@ Padres	1–5	Richard (3–5)	**Godley** (1–1)	—	27,198	26–19	L1
46	May 22	White Sox	5–1	**Greinke** (6–2)	González (3–5)	—	18,333	27–19	W1
47	May 23	White Sox	5–4	**Corbin** (4–4)	Covey (0–4)	**Rodney** (11)	17,865	28–19	W2
48	May 24	White Sox	8–6	**Chafin** (1–0)	Quintana (2–6)	**Rodney** (12)	18,002	29–19	W3
49	May 25	@ Brewers	4–0	**Ray** (4–3)	Davies (5–3)	—	30,081	30–19	W4
50	May 26	@ Brewers	4–2 (10)	**McFarland** (2–0)	Peralta (5–3)	**Rodney** (13)	25,391	31–19	W5
51	May 27	@ Brewers	1–6	Anderson (3–1)	**Greinke** (6–3)	—	29,746	31–20	L1
52	May 28	@ Brewers	5–9	Nelson (3–3)	**Corbin** (4–5)	Barnes(2)	41,698	31–21	L2
53	May 29	@ Pirates	3–4	Watson (4–1)	**Bradley** (1–1)	—	16,939	31–22	L3
54	May 30	@ Pirates	3–0	**Ray** (5–3)	Nova (5–4)	—	14,996	32–22	W1
55	May 31	@ Pirates	6–5 (14)	**McFarland** (3–0)	Mariñez (0–3)	—	20,990	33–22	W2

June: 17–9 (Home: 9–5; Away: 8–4)

#	Date	Opponent	Score	Win	Loss	Save	Attendance	Record	Streak
56	June 1	@ Marlins	3–2	**Greinke** (7–3)	Barraclough (1–1)	**Rodney** (14)	16,433	34–22	W3
57	June 2	@ Marlins	5–7	McGowan (3–0)	**Corbin** (4–6)	Ramos (7)	17,413	34–23	L1
58	June 3	@ Marlins	0–3	Volquez (2–7)	**Delgado** (1–1)	—	21,548	34–24	L2
59	June 4	@ Marlins	5–6	Wittgren (1–0)	**De La Rosa** (2–1)	Ramos (8)	20,387	34–25	L3
60	June 6	Padres	10–2	**Ray** (6–3)	Lamet (2–1)	—	25,883	35–25	W1
61	June 7	Padres	7–4	**Greinke** (8–3)	Perdomo (0–3)	**Rodney** (15)	22,079	36–25	W2
62	June 8	Padres	15–3	**Corbin** (5–6)	Richard (4–7)	—	21,340	37–25	W3
63	June 9	Brewers	6–8	Davies (7–3)	**McFarland** (3–1)	Knebel (8)	25,009	37–26	L1
64	June 10	Brewers	3–2	**Godley** (2–1)	Guerra (1–1)	**Rodney** (16)	40,195	38–26	W1
65	June 11	Brewers	11–1	**Ray** (7–3)	Anderson (5–2)	—	30,370	39–26	W2
66	June 13	@ Tigers	7–6	**Bradley** (2–1)	J. Wilson (2–2)	**Rodney** (17)	25,119	40–26	W3
67	June 14	@ Tigers	2–1	**Walker** (5–3)	Zimmermann (5–5)	**Rodney** (18)	26,134	41–26	W4
68	June 16	@ Phillies	5–4	**Corbin** (6–6)	Nola (3–5)	**Rodney** (19)	18,140	42–26	W5
69	June 17	@ Phillies	5–1	**De La Rosa** (3–1)	Ramos (0–4)	—	21,108	43–26	W6
70	June 18	@ Phillies	5–4 (12)	**Bradley** (3–1)	Gomez (3–2)	**Rodney** (20)	31,131	44–26	W7
71	June 20	@ Rockies	3–4	Ottavino (1–1)	**Greinke** (8–4)	Holland (25)	35,016	44–27	L1
72	June 21	@ Rockies	16–5	**Walker** (6–3)	Hoffman (4–1)	—	40,918	45–27	W1
73	June 22	@ Rockies	10–3	**Godley** (3–1)	Senzatela (9–3)	—	40,681	46–27	W2
74	June 23	Phillies	1–6	Leiter Jr. (1–0)	**Corbin** (6–7)	—	31,648	46–28	L1
75	June 24	Phillies	9–2	**Ray** (8–3)	Lively (1–2)	—	40,557	47–28	W1
76	June 25	Phillies	2–1 (11)	**McFarland** (4–1)	Ramos (0–7)	—	28,179	48–28	W2
77	June 26	Phillies	6–1	**Greinke** (9–4)	Pivetta (1–4)	—	20,765	49–28	W3
78	June 27	Cardinals	6–5 (10)	**Rodney** (2–2)	Bowman (1–3)	—	24,256	50–28	W4
79	June 28	Cardinals	3–4	Wainwright (8–5)	**Godley** (3–2)	Rosenthal (4)	23,188	50–29	L1
80	June 29	Cardinals	4–10	Lynn (6–5)	**De La Rosa** (0–1)	—	27,603	50–30	L2
81	June 30	Rockies	3–6	Gray (1–0)	**Ray** (8–4)	Holland (26)	23,275	50–31	L3

July: 10–14 (Home: 6–5; Away: 4–9)

#	Date	Opponent	Score	Win	Loss	Save	Attendance	Record	Streak
82	July 1	Rockies	6–2	**Greinke** (10–4)	Chatwood (6–9)	—	46,338	51–31	W1
83	July 2	Rockies	4–3	**Rodney** (3–2)	Ottavino (1–3)	—	34,556	52–31	W2
84	July 4	@ Dodgers	3–4	Kershaw (13–2)	**Corbin** (6–8)	Jansen (19)	53,159	52–32	L1
85	July 5	@ Dodgers	0–1	Wood (10–0)	**Godley** (3–3)	Jansen (20)	40,997	52–33	L2
86	July 6	@ Dodgers	4–5	Fields (4–0)	**Rodney** (3–3)	—	41,999	52–34	L3
87	July 7	Reds	6–3	**Greinke** (11–4)	Adleman (5–6)	**Rodney** (22)	27,006	53–34	W1
88	July 8	Reds	0–7	Castillo (1–0)	**Walker** (6–4)	—	29,806	53–35	L1
89	July 9	Reds	1–2	Bailey (2–2)	**Corbin** (6–9)	Iglesias (16)	24,923	53–36	L2
**88th All-Star Game in Miami, Florida**
90	July 14	@ Braves	3–4	Brothers (1–0)	**Bradley** (3–2)	Johnson (20)	38,852	53–37	L3
91	July 15	@ Braves	5–8	Krol (2–2)	**Delgado** (1–2)	Johnson (21)	41,627	53–38	L4
92	July 16	@ Braves	1–7	García (3–7)	**Godley** (3–4)	—	36,637	53–39	L5
93	July 18	@ Reds	11–2	**Ray** (9–4)	Romano (1–2)	—	19,989	54–39	W1
94	July 19	@ Reds	3–4 (11)	Lorenzen (5–2)	**McFarland** (4–2)	—	16,573	54–40	L1
95	July 20	@ Reds	12–2	**Corbin** (7–9)	Castillo (1–3)	—	19,711	55–40	W1
96	July 21	Nationals	7–6	**Rodney** (4–3)	Romero (2–4)	—	37,858	56–40	W2
97	July 22	Nationals	3–4	Roark (8–6)	**Banda** (0–1)	Doolittle (5)	39,176	56–41	L1
98	July 23	Nationals	2–6	Blanton (1–2)	**Ray** (9–5)	—	32,720	56–42	L2
99	July 24	Braves	10–2	**Greinke** (12–4)	Dickey (6–7)	—	20,862	57–42	W1
100	July 25	Braves	3–8	Foltynewicz (9–5)	**Hoover** (1–1)	—	25,069	57–43	L1
101	July 26	Braves	10–3	Corbin (8–9)	Blair (0–1)	—	25,836	58–43	W1
102	July 27	@ Cardinals	4–0	**Godley** (4–4)	Weaver (0–1)	—	39,208	59–43	W2
103	July 28	@ Cardinals	0–1	Wacha (8–4)	**McFarland** (4–3)	Rosenthal (5)	41,230	59–44	L1
104	July 29	@ Cardinals	7–1	**Greinke** (13–4)	Leake (7–9)	—	48,052	60–44	W1
105	July 30	@ Cardinals	2–3	Lynn (9–6)	**Walker** (6–5)	Rosenthal (6)	40,827	60–45	L1

August: 16–13 (Home: 9–5; Away: 7–8)

#	Date	Opponent	Score	Win	Loss	Save	Attendance	Record	Streak
106	August 1	@ Cubs	4–16	Rondon (3–1)	**Corbin** (8–10)	Montgomery (3)	40,709	60–46	L2
107	August 2	@ Cubs	3–0	**Godley** (5–4)	Arrieta (10–8)	**Rodney** (23)	41,321	61–46	W1
108	August 3	@ Cubs	10–8	**Barrett** (1–0)	Davis (2–1)	**Rodney** (24)	39,525	62–46	W2
109	August 4	@ Giants	2–1	**Banda** (1–1)	Bumgarner (1–5)	**Rodney** (25)	38,967	63–46	W3
110	August 5	@ Giants	4–5 (10)	Strickland (2–2)	**McFarland** (4–4)	—	39,532	63–47	L1
111	August 6	@ Giants	3–6	Samardzija (7–11)	**Corbin** (8–11)	Suárez (1)	40,107	63–48	L2
112	August 8	Dodgers	6–3	**Hernandez** (2–0)	Watson (5–4)	**Rodney** (26)	24,810	64–48	W1
113	August 9	Dodgers	2–3	Wood (14–1)	**Greinke** (13–5)	Jansen (29)	22,670	64–49	L1
114	August 10	Dodgers	6–8	Darvish (8–9)	**Banda** (1–2)	Jansen (30)	31,396	64–50	L2
115	August 11	Cubs	3–8	Lackey (10–9)	**Walker** (6–6)	—	39,131	64–51	L3
116	August 12	Cubs	6–2	**Corbin** (9–11)	Lester (8–7)	**Hernandez** (2)	42,219	65–51	W1
117	August 13	Cubs	2–7	Arrieta (12–8)	**Godley** (5–5)	—	41,760	65–52	L1
118	August 14	Astros	2–0	**Greinke** (14–5)	McHugh (0–2)	**Rodney** (27)	20,405	66–52	W1
119	August 15	Astros	4–9	Martes (5–2)	**Banda** (1–3)	—	16,935	66–53	L1
120	August 16	@ Astros	5–9	Morton (10–5)	**Walker** (6–7)	—	27,278	66–54	L2
121	August 17	@ Astros	4–0	**Corbin** (10–11)	Fiers (7–8)	—	27,949	67–54	W1
122	August 18	@ Twins	3–10	Santana (13–7)	**Godley** (6–7)	—	25,830	67–55	L1
123	August 19	@ Twins	0–5	Berríos (11–5)	**Greinke** (14–6)	—	29,456	67–56	L2
124	August 20	@ Twins	5–12	Colón (5–10)	**McFarland** (4–5)	—	27,367	67–57	L3
125	August 21	@ Mets	3–2 (10)	**Sherfy** (1–0)	Goeddel (0–1)	**Rodney** (28)	24,265	68–57	W1
126	August 22	@ Mets	7–4	**Corbin** (11–11)	Milone (1–3)	**Rodney** (29)	25,220	69–57	W2
127	August 23	@ Mets	2–4	Flexen (3–2)	**Godley** (5–7)	Ramos (23)	31,277	69–58	L1
128	August 24	@ Mets	3–2	**Ray** (10–5)	Montero (2–9)	**Rodney** (30)	25,284	70–58	W1
129	August 25	Giants	4–3	**Greinke** (15–6)	Blach (8–10)	**Rodney** (31)	31,924	71–58	W2
130	August 26	Giants	2–1	**Walker** (7–7)	Bumgarner (3–6)	**Rodney** (32)	25,709	72–58	W3
131	August 27	Giants	11–0	**Corbin** (12–11)	Stratton (2–3)	—	23,210	73–58	W4
132	August 29	Dodgers	7–6	**Godley** (6–7)	Hill (9–6)	**Rodney** (33)	25,219	74–58	W5
133	August 30	Dodgers	6–4	**Ray** (11–5)	Ryu (5–7)	**Rodney** (34)	23,321	75–58	W6
134	August 31	Dodgers	8–1	**Greinke** (16–6)	Maeda (12–6)	—	19,882	76–58	W7

September/October: 17–11 (Home: 7–6; Away: 10–5)

#	Date	Opponent	Score	Win	Loss	Save	Attendance	Record	Streak
135	September 1	@ Rockies	9–5	**Walker** (8–7)	Freeland (11–9)	—	29,628	77–58	W8
136	September 2	@ Rockies	6–2	**Corbin** (13–11)	Gray (6–4)	—	39,442	78–58	W9
137	September 3	@ Rockies	5–1	**Godley** (7–7)	Marquez (10–6)	**Sherfy** (1)	33,838	79–58	W10
138	September 4	@ Dodgers	13–0	**Ray** (12–5)	Hill (9–7)	—	47,192	80–58	W11
139	September 5	@ Dodgers	3–1 (10)	**Hernandez** (3–0)	Báez (3–4)	**Rodney** (35)	47,039	81–58	W12
140	September 6	@ Dodgers	3–1	**Walker** (9–7)	Avilán (2–2)	**Rodney** (36)	48,612	82–58	W13
141	September 8	Padres	6–10	Lyles (1–2)	**Corbin** (13–12)	—	27,988	82–59	L1
142	September 9	Padres	7–8	Maton (3–0)	**Rodney** (4–4)	Hand (17)	34,156	82–60	L2
143	September 10	Padres	3–2	**Ray** (13–5)	Perdomo (7–10)	**Bradley** (1)	23,854	83–60	W1
144	September 11	Rockies	4–5	Anderson (4–5)	**Barrett** (1–1)	Holland (40)	24,178	83–61	L1
145	September 12	Rockies	2–4	Gray (8–4)	**Hernandez** (3–1)	Rusin (2)	27,526	83–62	L2
146	September 13	Rockies	8–1	**Corbin** (14–12)	Marquez (10–7)	—	26,714	84–62	W1
147	September 14	Rockies	7–0	**Godley** (8–7)	Bettis (1–3)	—	20,317	85–62	W2
148	September 15	@ Giants	3–2	**Ray** (14–5)	Samardzija (9–14)	**Rodney** (37)	39,810	86–62	W3
149	September 16	@ Giants	2–0	**Greinke** (17–6)	Bumgarner (3–9)	**Rodney** (38)	37,846	87–62	W4
150	September 17	@ Giants	2–7	Stratton (3–3)	**Walker** (9–8)	—	38,476	87–63	L1
151	September 18	@ Padres	2–4	Perdomo (8–10)	**Corbin** (14–13)	Hand (19)	20,199	87–64	L2
152	September 19	@ Padres	2–6	Wood (4–6)	**Godley** (8–8)	—	20,101	87–65	L3
153	September 20	@ Padres	13–7	**Sherfy** (2–0)	Stammen (2–3)	—	25,797	88–65	W1
154	September 22	Marlins	13–11	**Hoover** (2–1)	McGowan (8–2)	**Rodney** (39)	34,588	89–65	W2
155	September 23	Marlins	6–12	Ellington (1–1)	**Walker** (9–9)	—	39,259	89–66	L1
156	September 24	Marlins	3–2	**Rodney** (5–4)	Nicolino (2–3)	—	31,539	90–66	W1
157	September 25	Giants	2–9	Cueto (8–8)	Godley' (8–9)	—	22,813	90–67	L1
158	September 26	Giants	11–4	**Ray** (15–5)	Moore (6–15)	—	27,487	91–67	W1
159	September 27	Giants	4–3	**Hoover** (3–1)	Dyson (3–3)	—	20,048	92–67	W2
160	September 29	@ Royals	1–2	Kennedy (5–13)	**Greinke** (17–7)	Minor (5)	23,488	92–68	L1
161	September 30	@ Royals	3–4	Junis (9–3)	**Bradley** (3–3)	Minor (6)	32,727	92–69	L2
162	October 1	@ Royals	14–2	**Banda** (2–3)	Vargas (18–11)	—	32,277	93–69	W1

Legend: = Win = Loss = Postponement
Bold = Diamondbacks team member

== Player stats ==
=== Batting ===
Note: G = Games played; AB = At bats; R = Runs; H = Hits; 2B = Doubles; 3B = Triples; HR = Home runs; RBI = Runs batted in; SB = Stolen bases; BB = Walks; AVG = Batting average; SLG = Slugging average

Player	G	AB	R	H	2B	3B	HR	RBI	SB	BB	AVG	SLG
Paul Goldschmidt	155	558	117	166	34	3	36	120	18	94	.297	.563
Jake Lamb	149	536	89	133	30	4	30	105	6	87	.248	.487
David Peralta	140	525	82	154	31	3	14	57	8	43	.293	.444
Brandon Drury	135	445	41	119	37	2	13	63	1	28	.267	.447
A. J. Pollock	112	425	73	113	33	6	14	49	20	35	.266	.471
Chris Owings	97	362	41	97	25	1	12	51	12	17	.268	.442
Daniel Descalso	130	344	47	80	16	5	10	51	4	48	.233	.395
Chris Iannetta	89	272	38	69	19	0	17	43	0	37	.254	.511
J. D. Martinez	62	232	47	70	13	1	29	65	2	44	.302	.741
Chris Herrmann	106	226	35	41	7	0	10	27	5	29	.181	.345
Gregor Blanco	90	224	43	55	10	3	3	13	15	31	.246	.357
Ketel Marte	73	223	30	58	11	2	5	18	3	29	.260	.395
Jeff Mathis	60	186	13	40	10	2	2	11	1	14	.215	.323
Nick Ahmed	53	167	24	42	8	1	6	21	3	10	.251	.419
Yasmany Tomás	47	166	19	40	11	1	8	32	0	13	.241	.464
Rey Fuentes	64	136	19	32	1	2	3	9	4	8	.235	.338
Adam Rosales	34	84	10	17	5	0	3	9	0	1	.202	.369
Jeremy Hazelbaker	41	52	10	18	2	2	2	10	1	9	.346	.577
Kristopher Negrón	14	25	3	4	1	0	0	1	0	4	.160	.200
Ildemaro Vargas	12	13	4	4	1	0	0	4	0	0	.308	.385
Christian Walker	11	12	2	3	1	0	2	2	0	1	.250	.833
John Ryan Murphy	5	7	0	1	1	0	0	1	0	0	.143	.286
Jack Reinheimer	2	5	0	0	0	0	0	0	0	0	.000	.000
Pitcher totals	162	300	25	49	7	1	1	14	0	16	.163	.203
Team totals	162	5525	812	1405	314	39	220	776	103	578	.254	.445

=== Pitching ===
Note: W = Wins; L = Losses; ERA = Earned run average; G = Games pitched; GS = Games started; SV = Saves; IP = Innings pitched; H = Hits allowed; R = Runs allowed; ER = Earned runs allowed; BB = Walks allowed; SO = Strikeouts

Player	W	L	ERA	G	GS	SV	IP	H	R	ER	BB	SO
Zack Greinke	17	7	3.20	32	32	0	202.1	172	80	72	45	215
Patrick Corbin	14	13	4.03	33	32	0	189.2	208	97	85	61	178
Robbie Ray	15	5	2.89	28	28	0	162.0	116	57	52	71	218
Taijuan Walker	9	9	3.49	28	28	0	157.1	148	76	61	61	146
Zack Godley	8	9	3.37	26	25	0	155.0	124	61	58	53	165
Archie Bradley	3	3	1.73	63	0	1	73.0	55	14	14	21	79
Randall Delgado	1	2	3.59	26	5	1	62.2	60	31	25	14	60
Fernando Rodney	5	4	4.23	61	0	39	55.1	40	29	26	26	65
T. J. McFarland	4	5	5.33	43	1	0	54.0	65	42	32	17	29
Jorge De La Rosa	3	1	4.21	65	0	0	51.1	46	24	24	21	45
Andrew Chafin	1	0	3.51	71	0	0	51.1	48	21	20	21	61
J. J. Hoover	3	1	3.92	52	0	0	41.1	47	20	18	26	54
Jake Barrett	1	1	5.00	28	0	0	27.0	27	18	15	15	26
Tom Wilhelmsen	1	1	4.44	27	0	0	26.1	25	13	13	12	17
Anthony Banda	2	3	5.96	8	4	0	25.2	26	17	17	10	25
Braden Shipley	0	1	5.76	10	3	0	25.0	31	18	16	15	18
Shelby Miller	2	2	4.09	4	4	0	22.0	20	10	10	12	20
Silvino Bracho	0	0	5.66	21	0	0	20.2	18	14	13	7	25
David Hernandez	2	1	4.82	26	0	1	18.2	19	10	10	1	15
James Sherfy	2	0	0.00	11	0	1	10.2	5	0	0	2	9
Rubby De La Rosa	0	1	4.70	9	0	0	7.2	7	4	4	4	12
Daniel Descalso	0	0	0.00	2	0	0	2.0	0	0	0	0	0
Matt Koch	0	0	inf	1	0	0	0.0	2	3	3	1	0
Team totals	93	69	3.66	162	162	43	1441.0	1309	659	586	516	1482

== Playoffs ==
Making it to the playoffs for the first time since 2011, the Diamondbacks played their first series as a Wild Card team by playing against the Colorado Rockies on October 4, 2017. That night, Archie Bradley became the first relief pitcher and sixth pitcher in MLB history to record a triple in a postseason game. The play was considered a major highlight in their first Wild Card game in franchise history, winning 11–8 that night at home. The Diamondbacks also became the first team to record 4 triples in a single playoff game since the Boston Americans in the 1903 World Series. They subsequently lost to the Dodgers in the NLDS.

=== Postseason game log ===
2017 Postseason Game Log (1–3)
NL Wild Card Game (1–0)

#	Date	Opponent	Score	Win	Loss	Save	Attendance	Record
1	October 4	Rockies	11–8	Chafin (1–0)	Gray (0–1)	—	48,803	1–0

NLDS (0–3)

#	Date	Opponent	Score	Win	Loss	Save	Attendance	Record
1	October 6	@ Dodgers	5–9	Kershaw (1–0)	Walker (0–1)	—	54,707	0–1
2	October 7	@ Dodgers	5–8	Maeda (1–0)	Ray (0–1)	Jansen (1)	54,726	0–2
3	October 9	Dodgers	1–3	Darvish (1–0)	Greinke (0–1)	Jansen (2)	48,641	0–3

=== Postseason rosters ===
Playoff rosters
National League Wild Card Game

- Pitchers: 21 Zack Greinke 25 Archie Bradley 29 Jorge de la Rosa 38 Robbie Ray 40 Andrew Chafin 46 Patrick Corbin 47 David Hernandez 52 Zack Godley 54 Jimmie Sherfy 56 Fernando Rodney
- Catchers: 2 Jeff Mathis 8 Chris Iannetta 10 Chris Herrmann
- Infielders: 3 Daniel Descalso 4 Ketel Marte 9 Adam Rosales 22 Jake Lamb 27 Brandon Drury 44 Paul Goldschmidt 45 Kristopher Negrón
- Outfielders: 5 Gregor Blanco 6 David Peralta 11 A. J. Pollock 14 Reymond Fuentes 28 J. D. Martinez

National League Division Series

- Pitchers: 21 Zack Greinke 25 Archie Bradley 29 Jorge de la Rosa 38 Robbie Ray 40 Andrew Chafin 46 Patrick Corbin 47 David Hernandez 52 Zack Godley 54 Jimmie Sherfy 56 Fernando Rodney 99 Taijuan Walker
- Catchers: 2 Jeff Mathis 8 Chris Iannetta
- Infielders: 3 Daniel Descalso 4 Ketel Marte 9 Adam Rosales 22 Jake Lamb 27 Brandon Drury 44 Paul Goldschmidt 45 Kristopher Negrón 53 Christian Walker
- Outfielders: 5 Gregor Blanco 6 David Peralta 11 A. J. Pollock 28 J. D. Martinez

== Roster ==
2017 Arizona Diamondbacks
Roster
Pitchers: 50 Anthony Banda; 33 Jake Barrett; 61 Silvino Bracho; 25 Archie Bradley; 40 Andrew Chafin; 46 Patrick Corbin; 29 Jorge de la Rosa; 12 Rubby De La Rosa; 48 Randall Delgado; 52 Zack Godley; 21 Zack Greinke; 47 David Hernandez; 60 J. J. Hoover; 55 Matt Koch; 30 T. J. McFarland; 26 Shelby Miller; 38 Robbie Ray; 56 Fernando Rodney; 54 Jimmie Sherfy; 34 Braden Shipley; 99 Taijuan Walker; 54 Tom Wilhelmsen	Catchers: 10 Chris Herrmann; 8 Chris Iannetta; 2 Jeff Mathis; 36 John Ryan Murphy; Infielders: 13 Nick Ahmed; 3 Daniel Descalso; 27 Brandon Drury; 44 Paul Goldschmidt; 22 Jake Lamb; 4 Ketel Marte; 45 Kristopher Negron; 16 Chris Owings; 76 Jack Reinheimer; 9 Adam Rosales; 15 Ildemaro Vargas; 53 Christian Walker	Outfielders: 5 Gregor Blanco; 14 Reymond Fuentes; 41 Jeremy Hazelbaker; 28 J. D. Martinez; 6 David Peralta; 11 A. J. Pollock; 24 Yasmany Tomas	Manager: 17 Torey Lovullo; Coaches: 23 Mike Butcher (pitching); 43 Mike Fetters (bullpen); 35 Ron Gardenhire (bench); 7 Robby Hammock (quality control/catching); 59 Tim Laker (assistant hitting); 18 Dave Magadan (hitting); 39 Dave McKay (first base); 57 Jerry Narron (interim bench); 1 Tony Perezchica (third base); 49 Ariel Prieto (assistant coach/interpreter); 83 Mark Reed (bullpen catcher); 84 Humberto Quintero (bullpen catcher)

== Awards ==
First baseman Paul Goldschmidt won his third Silver Slugger Award as the best offensive player at his position in the National League.

== Farm system ==
Level	Team	League	Manager
AAA	Reno Aces	Pacific Coast League	Greg Gross and Jerry Narron
AA	Jackson Generals	Southern League	J. R. House
A-Advanced	Visalia Rawhide	California League	Shelley Duncan
A	Kane County Cougars	Midwest League	Butch Hobson
A-Short Season	Hillsboro Hops	Northwest League	Shawn Roof
Rookie	Missoula Osprey	Pioneer League	Mike Benjamin
Rookie	AZL Diamondbacks	Arizona League	Javier Colina
Rookie	DSL Diamondbacks	Dominican Summer League	

== See also ==
- List of Major League Baseball single-game home run leaders
