= Slania (surname) =

Slania or Słania is a surname. Notable people with the surname include:

- Czesław Słania (1921–2005), Polish postage stamp and banknote engraver
- Dan Slania (born 1992), American baseball player
