= Hillcrest Christian School =

Location
- 4060 South Siwell Road; Jackson, Mississippi; United States; 32.2430314°N 90.30023349°W

Information
- Type: Private Christian school
- Established: 1970
- Grades: K3 through 12
- Gender: Coeducational
- Enrollment: 216
- Campus: Urban
- Colors: Royal blue, white, gray, and black
- Mascot: Cougars
- Yearbook: The Cougar
- Affiliations: Southern Association of Independent Schools, Southern Association of Colleges and Schools, and the Mississippi Private School Association
- Website: Official site

Hillcrest Christian School is a private Christian school in Jackson, Mississippi, United States. The school traces its history to a segregation academy founded by the White Citizens Council.

== History ==
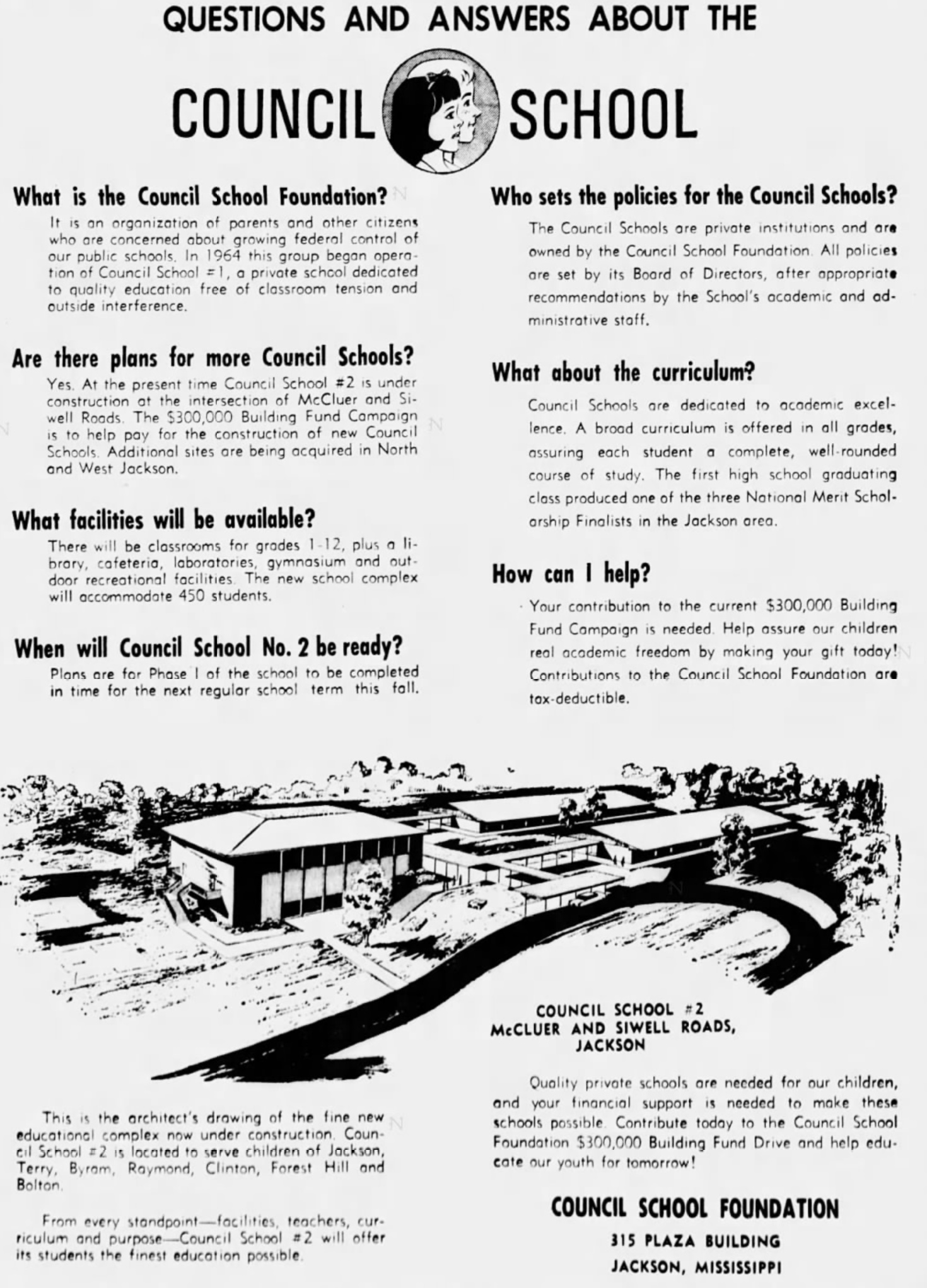
Hillcrest Christian school occupies the campus of McLuer Academy which was originally founded as a segregation academy by the White Citizens Council.

=== Racial segregation ===
Hillcrest was established in 1970 as a segregation academy in response to the court-ordered integration of public schools.

In 1985, W.J Simmons, chair of the state White Citizens Council, discussed the history of the school with Clarion-Ledger. Simmons acknowledged that "Race was a motivating factor in the early days." Simmons also stated "admitting blacks lowers educational standards. Racial mixing is wrong when it's forced. And if it's not forced, it's not likely to occur." In the same article, headmaster Gary McGee said that he didn't know if the Hillcrest Christian school would admit black students and that if a black student applied for entrance, the matter would need to be discussed by the school's trustees. In 1987 the school refused to play a B team football game because the opponent, Natchez Trace, had a Black player.

=== Campus ===
The current campus was originally known as Council McCluer, which was a separate school opened the same year as Hillcrest. Council McCluer was part of a system of twelve schools in Jackson founded and run by the Citizens' Council of Jackson.

For much of its early life, the school was located at Sykes Road and Wheatley Drive in south Jackson, and operated as a K-9 school. In 1985 the school merged with the McCluer Academy, another segregation academy. The combined school used the former McCluer Academy campus on Siwell Road for the high school and middle school. The school ultimately moved all operations to that campus and sold the Wheatley property in the late 1990s following the construction of an elementary school building at the Siwell campus.

== Education ==
Hillcrest educates pupils from kindergarten 3 to grade 12.

== Notable alumni ==
- Phil Bryant - Governor of Mississippi, withdrew from McCluer Academy before graduating.
- Taryn Foshee - won the 2003 Miss Clinton pageant while a pupil at Hillcrest Christian School and received a commendation from the Mississippi Legislature; 2006 Miss Mississippi; 3rd runner-up in Miss America 2007
- Stephen Head - minor league first basemen for Cleveland Indians and winner of Boo Ferris Award, given to Mississippi's top collegiate baseball player
- Carlos Moncrief - outfielder for San Francisco Giants
- Seth Smith - outfielder for Oakland Athletics
