= Miguel Gómez (infielder) =

Dominican baseball player (born 1992)

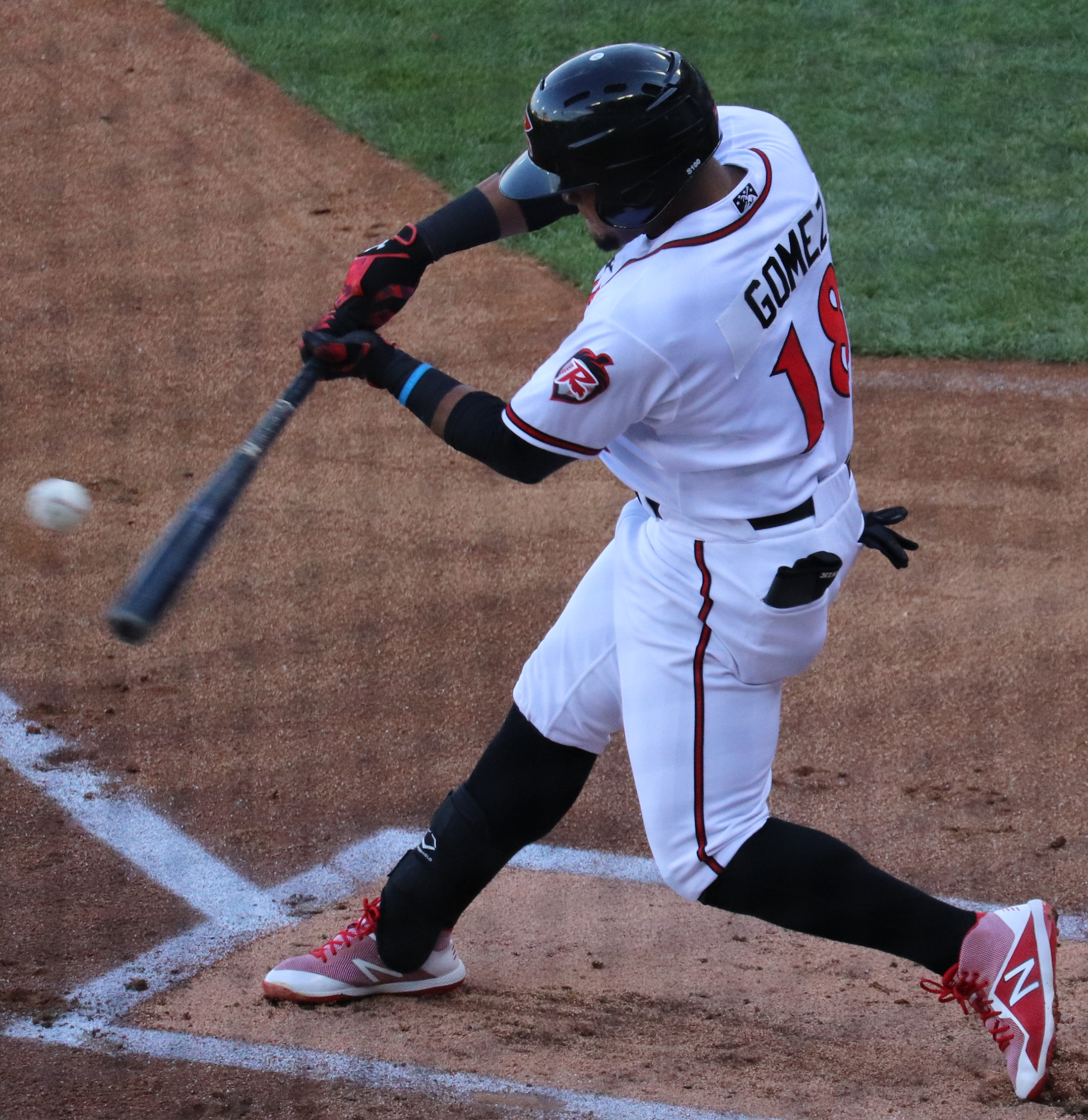
- Gómez with the Richmond Flying Squirrels in 2018
- Infielder
- Born: December 17, 1992 (age 32); Santo Domingo, Dominican Republic
- Batted: Switch Threw: Right

MLB debut
- July 7, 2017, for the San Francisco Giants

Last MLB appearance
- May 27, 2018, for the San Francisco Giants

MLB statistics
- Batting average: .250
- Home runs: 0
- Runs batted in: 3
- Stats at Baseball Reference

Teams
- San Francisco Giants (2017–2018)

Miguel Gómez (born December 17, 1992) is a Dominican former professional baseball infielder. He played in Major League Baseball (MLB) for the San Francisco Giants.

== Career ==
=== San Francisco Giants ===
On May 31, 2012, Gómez signed with the San Francisco Giants as an international free agent. On November 18, 2016, the Giants added Gómez to their 40-man roster to protect him from the Rule 5 draft.

Gomez started 2017 with the Richmond Flying Squirrels and was called up on July 7 to the Giants. He made his debut the same day against the Miami Marlins as a pinch hitter, going hitless in his only at bat. He picked up his first major league hit and RBI two days later. Gómez finished his rookie campaign with a .242/.235/.303 batting line and two RBI.

Gómez played in nine games for San Francisco in 2018, going 4–for–15 (.267) with one RBI. On October 22, 2018, he was removed from the 40–man roster and sent outright to the Triple–A Sacramento River Cats. Gómez elected free agency following the season on November 2.

=== Milwaukee Milkmen ===
On November 8, 2019, Gómez signed with the Milwaukee Milkmen of the independent American Association. He did not appear in a game for the team during the 2020 season, but won the American Association championship with the Milkmen that year. He also did not see game action in 2021, but returned to make 38 appearances for Milwaukee in 2022. In 165 plate appearances, he hit .298/.321/.475 with 6 home runs and 22 RBI.

Gómez re-signed with the Milkmen on March 6, 2023. He played in 93 games for the team, batting .296/.335/.429 with 11 home runs and 54 RBI.

=== New Jersey Jackals ===
On December 20, 2023, Gómez signed with the New Jersey Jackals of the Frontier League. In 36 games for the Jackals in 2024, he batted .303/.329/.386 with three home runs and 28 RBI.

On July 13, 2025, Gómez played in his final game for the Jackals before retiring from playing baseball.

== International career ==
Before the 2019 season, he was selected for Dominican Republic national baseball team at the 2019 Pan American Games Qualifier, and later participated in the 2019 Pan American Games.
