= Jake Lamb =

American baseball player (born 1990)

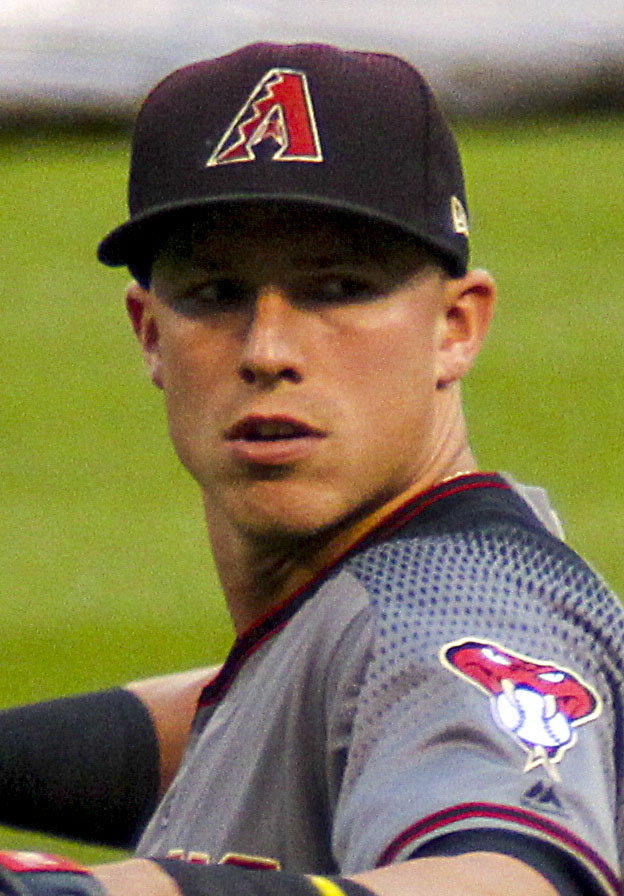
- Lamb with the Arizona Diamondbacks in 2017
- Third baseman
- Born: October 9, 1990 (age 35); Seattle, Washington, U.S.
- Batted: Left Threw: Right

MLB debut
- August 7, 2014, for the Arizona Diamondbacks

Last MLB appearance
- May 7, 2023, for the Los Angeles Angels

MLB statistics
- Batting average: .235
- Home runs: 96
- Runs batted in: 342
- Stats at Baseball Reference

Teams
- Arizona Diamondbacks (2014–2020); Oakland Athletics (2020); Chicago White Sox (2021); Toronto Blue Jays (2021); Los Angeles Dodgers (2022); Seattle Mariners (2022); Los Angeles Angels (2023)

Career highlights and awards
- All-Star (2017)

Jacob Ryan Lamb (born October 9, 1990) is an American former professional baseball third baseman. He made his Major League Baseball (MLB) debut with the Arizona Diamondbacks in 2014 and was an All-Star in 2017. He also played in MLB for the Oakland Athletics, Chicago White Sox, Toronto Blue Jays, Los Angeles Dodgers, Seattle Mariners, and Los Angeles Angels.

== Early life and amateur career ==
Lamb grew up in the Queen Anne neighborhood of Seattle, Washington. He attended Bishop Blanchet High School and starred for their baseball team.

After graduating high school, the Pittsburgh Pirates selected Lamb in the 38th round of the 2009 MLB draft, but chose instead to attend the University of Washington. He played college baseball for the Washington Huskies. He was named an All-Pac-12 Conference player. After his sophomore season in 2011, he played collegiate summer baseball for the Yarmouth–Dennis Red Sox of the Cape Cod Baseball League.

== Professional career ==
=== Arizona Diamondbacks (2012–2020) ===
==== Minor leagues ====
The Arizona Diamondbacks selected Lamb in the sixth round of the 2012 MLB draft. He made his professional debut that year for the Missoula Osprey of the Rookie-level Pioneer League. Lamb played for the Visalia Rawhide of the High-A California League in 2013, playing in only 64 games due to a hamstring injury. The Diamondbacks assigned Lamb to the Arizona Fall League after the season. They invited him to spring training in 2014. He began the 2014 season with the Mobile Bay Bears of the Double-A Southern League and was promoted to the Reno Aces of the Triple-A Pacific Coast League.

==== Major leagues ====
After the Diamondbacks traded Martín Prado on July 31, they promoted Lamb to the major leagues on August 7. In 37 games that season, Lamb had a .230 batting average with four home runs. He began the 2015 season on the disabled list but returned and played in 107 games, hitting .263 with six home runs and 34 runs batted in (RBI). During the 2016 season, he hit .291 with 20 home runs and 61 RBI in the first half and was a finalist for the last MLB All-Star Game spot in the All-Star Final Vote. After struggling in the second half, in which he hit .197 (46-for-234), Lamb finished the season with a .249 average, 29 home runs, 91 RBI, and nine triples.

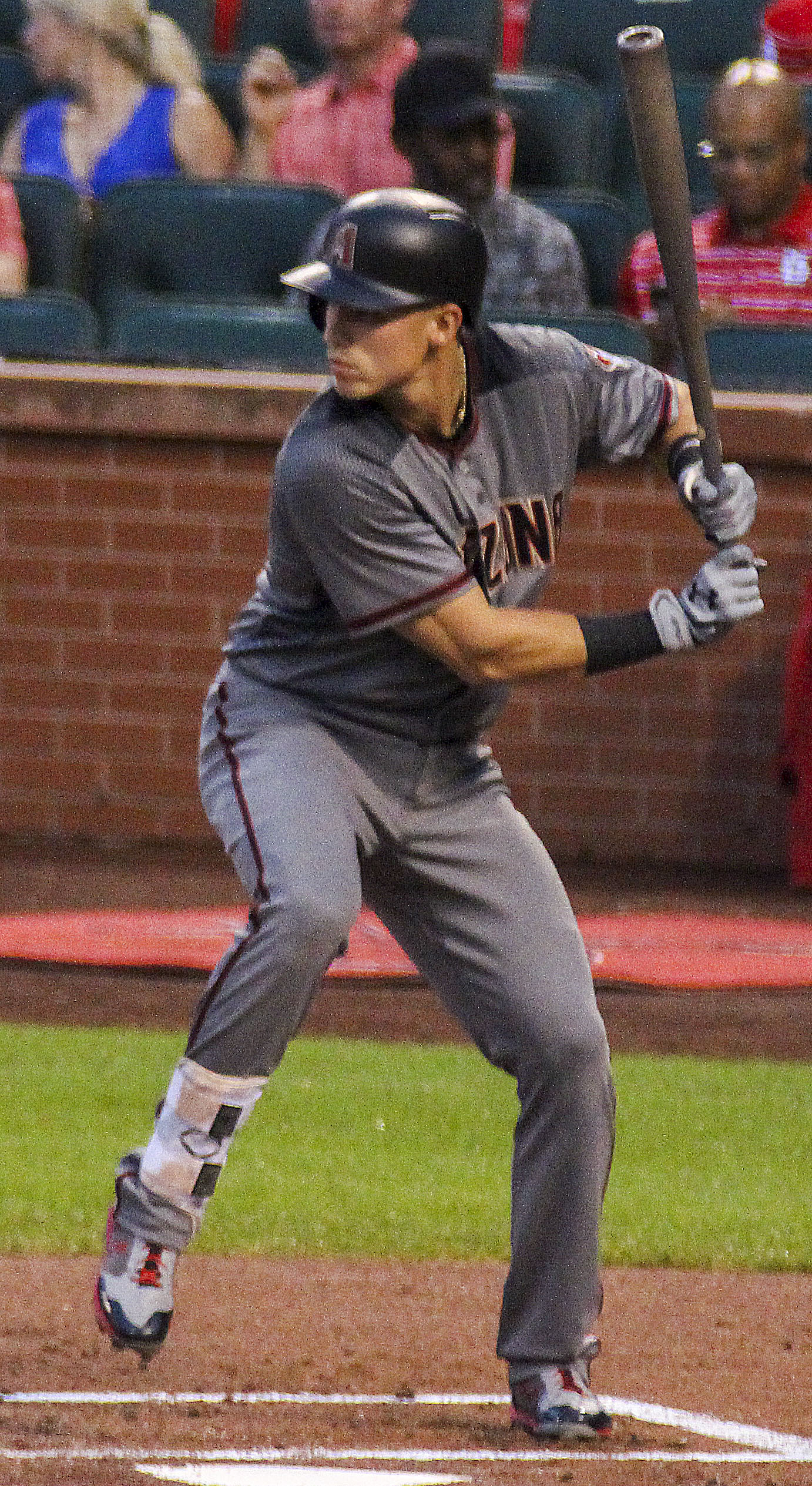
Lamb at bat in 2017

Lamb was selected to play in the 2017 All-Star Game. He finished the season hitting .248 with 30 home runs, 105 RBI and 87 walks, although he managed more consistent splits (.246 in the first half and .250 in the second half). On August 2, 2018, he was ruled out for the season as he underwent season-ending shoulder surgery. In 56 games, he hit .222 with six home runs and 31 RBI.

On April 5, 2019, Lamb went on the injured list with a Grade 2 strain to his left quadriceps muscle. He returned to the Diamondbacks in late June. He batted .193 for the 2019 season.

Lamb and the Diamondbacks agreed to a $5.5 million salary for the 2020 season. On September 10, the Diamondbacks designated Lamb for assignment. He hit .116/.240/.210 with no home runs over 50 plate appearances in his final stint with Arizona, which released him on September 12.

=== Oakland Athletics (2020) ===
On September 14, 2020, Lamb signed a major league contract with the Oakland Athletics and was added to their active roster. In 13 games for Oakland, serving as Matt Chapman's injury replacement, Lamb slashed .267/.327/.556 with three home runs and nine RBI in 45 at-bats.

=== Atlanta Braves (2021) ===
On February 21, 2021, Lamb agreed to a $1 million contract with the Atlanta Braves. On March 27, the Braves released Lamb due to his underwhelming performance during spring training.

=== Chicago White Sox (2021) ===
On March 30, 2021, Lamb agreed to a contract with the Chicago White Sox. He played in 43 games, batting .212/.321/.389 with 6 home runs and 13 RBI, before he was designated for assignment on September 1, 2021.

=== Toronto Blue Jays (2021) ===
On September 3, 2021, Lamb was claimed off waivers by the Toronto Blue Jays. Later that month, he was designated for assignment by the Blue Jays following Breyvic Valera's return from the COVID-19 related injured list. Toronto released Lamb on September 29.

=== Los Angeles Dodgers (2022) ===
On March 14, 2022, Lamb signed a minor league contract with the Los Angeles Dodgers. He was assigned to the Triple-A Oklahoma City Dodgers, where he hit .290 in 61 games with 15 home runs. On June 28, he was called up to the majors. He played in 25 games for the Dodgers, hitting .239 with two home runs and four RBI.

=== Seattle Mariners (2022) ===
On August 2, 2022, the Dodgers traded Lamb to the Seattle Mariners for cash. He played in five games for the hometown Mariners. On September 21, Lamb was designated for assignment and became a free agent on September 24.

=== Los Angeles Angels (2023) ===
On December 21, 2022, Lamb signed a minor league contract with the Los Angeles Angels. On March 29, 2023, Lamb had his contract selected, making the Angels' Opening Day roster. He played in 18 games for the Angels, batting .216/.259/.353 with 2 home runs and 5 RBI. On June 30, Lamb was designated for assignment following the promotion of Víctor Mederos. Lamb was released by the Angels the following day.

=== Return to the minors (2023–2025) ===
On July 14, 2023, Lamb signed a minor league contract with the New York Yankees organization. In 51 games for the Triple-A Scranton/Wilkes-Barre RailRiders, he hit .269/.396/.427 with 6 home runs and 26 RBI. He elected free agency following the season on November 6.

On December 21, Lamb signed a minor league contract with the Pittsburgh Pirates organization. In 55 games for the Triple-A Indianapolis Indians, he batted .289/.380/.416 with four home runs and 31 RBI. Lamb opted out of his contract and became a free agent on June 18, 2024. The Pirates re-signed Lamb to another minor league contract on June 28. He elected free agency following the season on November 4.

On January 27, 2025, Lamb signed a minor league contract with the San Francisco Giants. In 45 games for the Triple-A Sacramento River Cats, he batted .240/.352/.353 with two home runs and 20 RBI. Lamb was released by the Giants organization on June 2.

== Post-playing career ==
On December 9, 2025, Lamb accepted a player development role with the Arizona Diamondbacks. His title in 2026 was "assistant, player development" in the team's baseball operations department.

== Personal life ==
Lamb's father played college football for Whitworth University, and his mother was a tennis player in high school and college. Lamb's older brother, Dan, played two sports in high school. His younger brother also played college baseball for the Washington Huskies. His sister played softball after surviving leukemia.

Lamb and his wife were married in December 2021 in Palm Springs, California.
