= Carlos Moncrief =

American baseball player (born 1988)

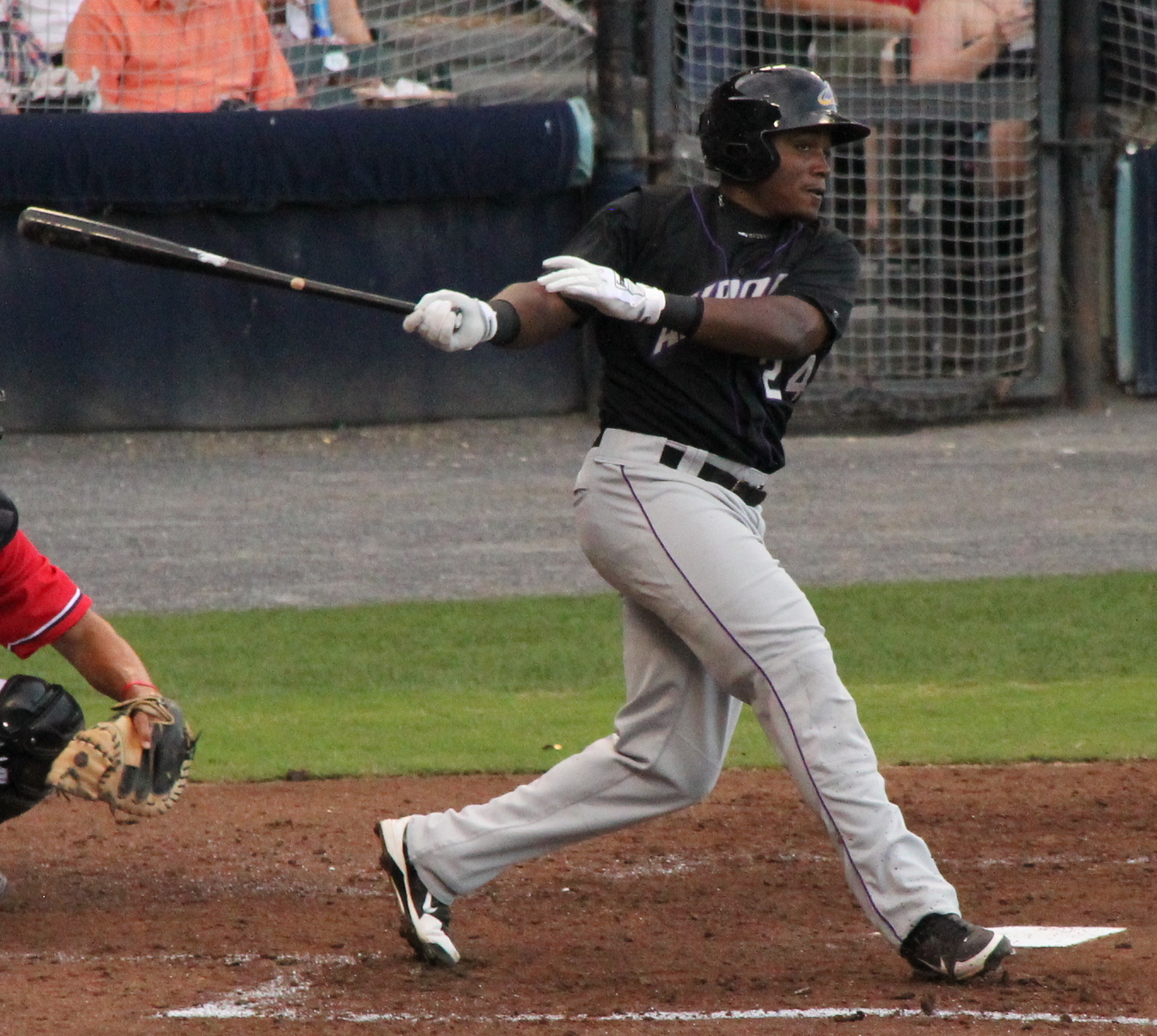
- Moncrief with the Akron Aeros in 2013
- Right fielder
- Born: November 3, 1988 (age 37); Jackson, Mississippi, U.S.
- Batted: Left Threw: Right

MLB debut
- July 29, 2017, for the San Francisco Giants

Last MLB appearance
- September 4, 2017, for the San Francisco Giants

MLB statistics
- Batting average: .211
- Home runs: 0
- Runs batted in: 5
- Stats at Baseball Reference

Teams
- San Francisco Giants (2017)

Carlos Antwan Moncrief (born November 3, 1988) is an American former professional baseball outfielder. He played in Major League Baseball (MLB) for the San Francisco Giants.

== Early life and family ==
Carlos Antwan Moncrief was born in Jackson, Mississippi. His father, Homer, was drafted as a pitcher by the Detroit Tigers in the 1980 amateur draft; Homer advanced to Double-A in 1982 but was released two years later. He later played in an over-30 league.

== Career ==
=== Cleveland Indians ===
Moncrief attended Hillcrest Christian School in Jackson, MS and Chipola Junior College. The Cleveland Indians selected him in the 14th round of the 2008 Major League Baseball draft as a pitcher. After he struggled in 2008 and 2009, Moncrief transitioned into an outfielder.

=== San Francisco Giants ===
On November 14, 2015, Moncrief signed a minor league contract with the San Francisco Giants. He played for the Richmond Flying Squirrels of the Double–A Eastern League in 2016, hitting .261/.372/.409 with five home runs and 22 RBI over 72 appearances. Moncrief elected free agency following the season on November 7, 2016.

Moncrief re–signed with the Giants organization on a new minor league contract on November 13, 2016. On July 26, 2017, the Giants selected Moncrief to the 40-man roster and promoted him to the major leagues for the first time. He made his MLB debut on July 29, drawing a walk in his first plate appearance, which came against Los Angeles Dodgers reliever Luis Avilán. On July 31, Moncrief recorded his first career hit against the Oakland Athletics in the fourth inning. He played in 28 games during his rookie campaign, batting .211/.256/.237 with five RBI.

=== Generales de Durango ===
On April 17, 2018, Moncrief signed with the Generales de Durango of the Mexican Baseball League. He was released on May 27, 2019.

== Personal life ==
Moncrief and his wife, Brandy, have four sons.
