= Dan Slania =

American baseball player (born 1992)

- Pitcher
- Born: May 24, 1992 (age 34); Phoenix, Arizona, U.S.
- Batted: Right Threw: Right

MLB debut
- June 30, 2017, for the San Francisco Giants

Last MLB appearance
- June 30, 2017, for the San Francisco Giants

MLB statistics
- Win–loss record: 0–0
- Earned run average: 0.00
- Strikeouts: 0
- Stats at Baseball Reference

Teams
- San Francisco Giants (2017)

Daniel Alexander Slania (born May 24, 1992) is an American former professional baseball pitcher. He played in Major League Baseball (MLB) for the San Francisco Giants in 2017.

== Amateur career ==
Slania was drafted by the Boston Red Sox in the 42nd round of the 2010 Major League Baseball draft out of Salpointe High School in Tucson, Arizona. He did not sign with the Red Sox and attended the University of Notre Dame to play college baseball. In 2012, he played collegiate summer baseball with the Cotuit Kettleers of the Cape Cod Baseball League and was named a league all-star.

== Professional career ==
Slania was drafted by the San Francisco Giants in the fifth round, with the 162nd overall selection, of the 2013 Major League Baseball draft. He made his professional debut for the Low-A Salem-Keizer Volcanoes, posting a 3.95 ERA over 12 games. Slania split the 2014 season between the Single-A Augusta GreenJackets and Double-A Richmond Flying Squirrels. In 53 appearances out of the bullpen for the two affiliates, he compiled an aggregate 2-5 record and 3.47 ERA with 49 strikeouts and 12 saves over 70 innings. In 2015, Slania made 59 relief appearances for the High-A San Jose Giants, logging a 4-5 record and 3.53 ERA with 90 strikeouts and 16 saves across 91 1/3 innings pitched.

Slania became a starting pitcher midway through the 2016 season after previously pitching in relief throughout his career and in college. In 34 appearances (16 starts) split between San Jose, Richmond, and the Triple-A Sacramento River Cats, he registered a combined 11-8 record and 2.93 ERA with 111 strikeouts across 119 2/3 innings pitched. On November 18, 2016, the Giants added Slania to their 40-man roster to protect him from the Rule 5 draft.

On June 28, 2017, following an injury to Mark Melancon, Slania was promoted to the major leagues for the first time. He made his MLB debut on June 30, tossing a scoreless inning of relief against the Pittsburgh Pirates, and was optioned down to Triple-A the following day. On November 20, Slania was removed from the 40-man roster and sent outright to Triple-A Sacramento.

Slania spent the 2018 season with Double-A Richmond, posting a 1-3 record and 2.43 ERA with 69 strikeouts in 70 1/3 innings pitched across 47 appearances. Slania was released by the Giants organization on March 18, 2019.
