= Ty Blach =

American baseball player (born 1990)

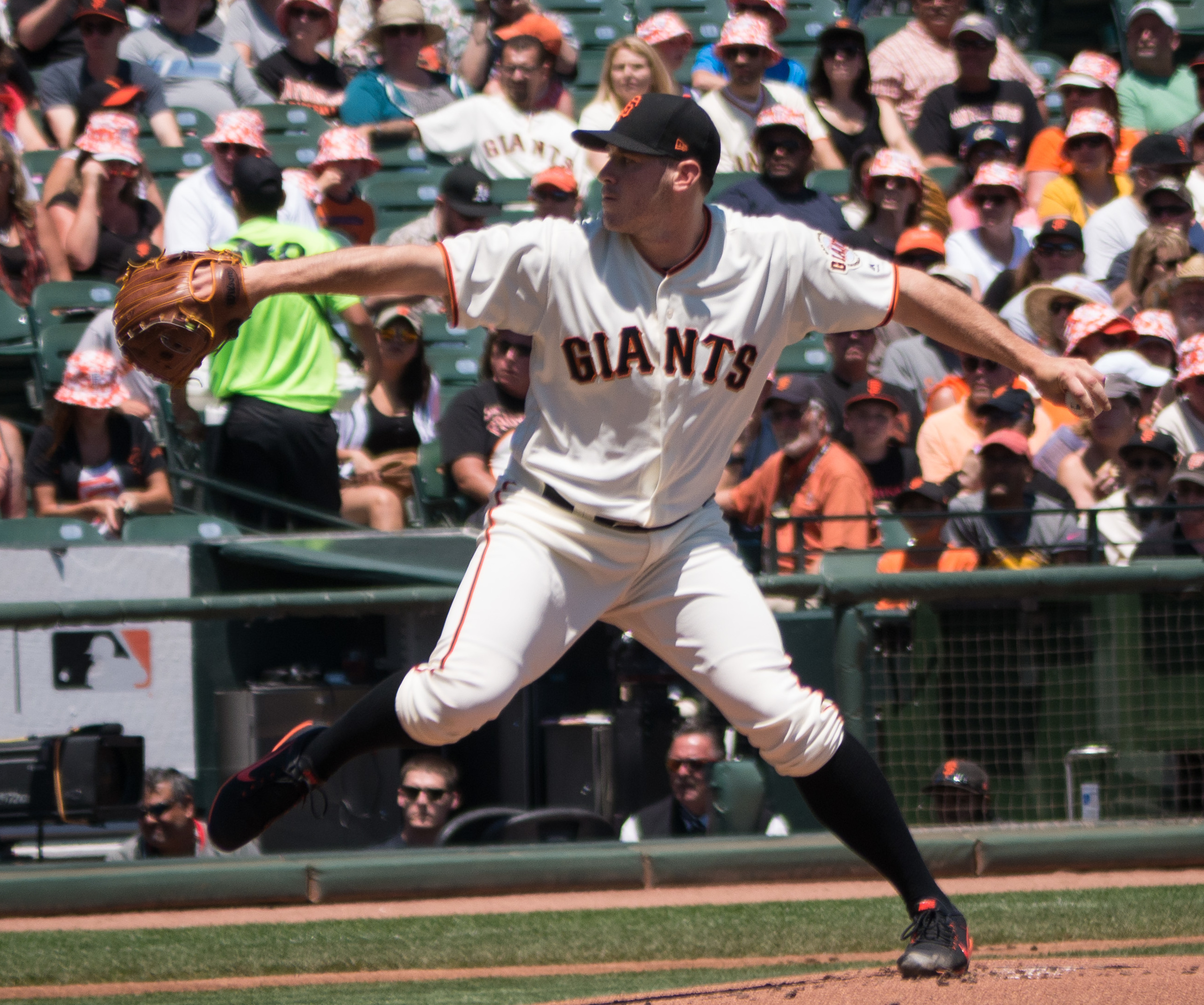
- Blach with the San Francisco Giants in 2017

Free agent
- Pitcher
- Born: October 20, 1990 (age 36); Denver, Colorado, U.S.
- Bats: Right Throws: Left

MLB debut
- September 5, 2016, for the San Francisco Giants

MLB statistics (through May 18, 2026)
- Win–loss record: 23–33
- Earned run average: 5.39
- Strikeouts: 295
- Stats at Baseball Reference

Teams
- San Francisco Giants (2016–2019); Baltimore Orioles (2019); Colorado Rockies (2022–2024); Chicago Cubs (2026)

Tyson Michael Blach (/ˈblɑːk/ BLAHK; born October 20, 1990) is an American professional baseball pitcher who is a free agent. He has previously played in Major League Baseball (MLB) for the San Francisco Giants, Baltimore Orioles, Colorado Rockies, and Chicago Cubs. He played college baseball for the Creighton Bluejays and was selected by the Giants in the fifth round of the 2012 Major League Baseball draft.

== Career ==
=== Amateur career ===
Blach played baseball and tennis for Regis Jesuit High School in Aurora, Colorado. He then attended Creighton University, where he played college baseball for the Creighton Bluejays.

=== San Francisco Giants ===
The San Francisco Giants selected Blach in the fifth round (178th overall) of the 2012 Major League Baseball draft. He made his professional debut in 2013 for the San Jose Giants. In 22 games (20 starts), he went 12–4 with a 2.90 earned run average (ERA), 117 strikeouts and 18 base on balls in 130 1/3 innings. He spent the 2014 season with the Richmond Flying Squirrels where he was 8–8 with a 3.13 ERA in 25 starts. Blach spent 2015 with the Sacramento River Cats where he compiled an 11–12 record and a 4.46 ERA in 27 starts.

The Giants added Blach to their 40-man roster after the 2015 season. Before being called up by the Giants, Blach spent 2016 with Sacramento where he pitched to a 14–7 record with a 3.43 ERA in 26 starts.

Blach was promoted to the Major Leagues for September call-ups on September 1, 2016. Blach made his major league debut on September 5, 2016, against the Colorado Rockies. He entered the game in the bottom of the sixth inning and pitched three scoreless innings while allowing one hit. On October 1, 2016, in his second MLB start, Blach pitched eight shutout innings against Clayton Kershaw and the Los Angeles Dodgers, allowing three hits and securing his first win. He also had his first and second MLB hits against Kershaw. Blach was the winning pitcher in Game 3 of the 2016 NLDS against the Chicago Cubs after pitching two scoreless innings in relief. In four games (two starts) for San Francisco, he was 1–0 with a 1.06 ERA.

Despite being a starter throughout his minor league career, Blach opened the 2017 season in the Giants bullpen as their lone left-handed reliever; however, later in April, after pitcher Madison Bumgarner was injured, Blach was put into the starting rotation. On August 3, Blach hit his first major league home run. He spent all of 2017 with the Giants, going 8–12 with a 4.78 ERA in 34 games (24 starts). He had the fewest strikeouts per 9 innings in the major leagues (4.01).

Blach started Opening Day of the 2018 MLB season against the Los Angeles Dodgers, his first career Opening Day start. He gave up three hits, three walks, and no runs over five innings to earn the win over Clayton Kershaw. Blach would then for the remainder of the season switch between a starting and relief role for San Francisco. He ended the season with a 6–7 record in 47 games, 13 starts. He struck out 75 batters in 118 2/3 innings.

In 2019, Blach spent the majority of the first half in the Giants minor league system. He was designated for assignment on July 27, 2019.

=== Baltimore Orioles ===
Blach was claimed off waivers by the Baltimore Orioles on August 3, 2019. Blach made 5 appearances for Baltimore, but struggled to an 11.32 ERA in 20 2/3 innings pitched. On September 16, Blach was designated for assignment, and was outrighted to the Triple-A Norfolk Tides on September 19. He made two appearances for the Tides before the end of the year, but struggled tremendously, allowing 10 runs in 5 1/3 innings of work. Blach did not play in a minor league game in 2020 due to the cancellation of the minor league season because of the COVID-19 pandemic. On July 15, 2020, Blach underwent Tommy John surgery, causing him to miss the truncated 2020 Major League season. On August 10, Blach was released by the Orioles organization.

On March 30, 2021, Blach re-signed with the Orioles on a minor league contract. Blach would return to play in 2021, playing in 16 games between the Florida Complex League Orioles and the Single-A Delmarva Shorebirds, pitching to a 1.23 ERA with 23 strikeouts in 22 innings pitched. He elected free agency following the season on November 7.

=== Colorado Rockies ===
On December 17, 2021, Blach signed a minor league contract with the Colorado Rockies organization. On April 4, 2022, Blach had his contract selected to the major league roster. He made 24 appearances for the Rockies, recording a 5.89 ERA with 29 strikeouts and one save in 44 1/3 innings pitched. On November 9, Blach was removed from the 40-man roster and sent outright to Triple-A.

On January 10, 2023, Blach re-signed with the Rockies on a minor league deal. On March 25, the Rockies announced that Blach had made the Opening Day roster and would be selected to the 40-man roster. On April 29, Blach was designated for assignment after Randal Grichuk was activated off of the injured list. He cleared waivers and was sent outright to the Triple-A Albuquerque Isotopes on May 2. He was re–selected to the major league roster on June 30. In 20 games (13 starts) for the Rockies, he registered a 5.54 ERA with 50 strikeouts in 78.0 innings of work. Following the season on October 18, Blach was removed from the 40–man roster and sent outright to Triple–A Albuquerque. On October 20, Blach elected free agency.

On December 21, 2023, Blach again re-signed with the Rockies on a minor-league deal, which included an invitation to spring training. After beginning the year in Triple–A, he was selected to the major league roster on April 21, 2024. In 18 games (10 starts) for Colorado, Blach compiled a 3–6 record and 6.36 ERA with 34 strikeouts across 63 2/3 innings pitched. He was designated for assignment by the Rockies on July 27. Blach cleared waivers and was sent outright to Albuquerque on August 2. On September 1, the Rockies selected Blach's contract, adding him to their active roster. On September 8, the Rockies designated Blach for assignment to clear roster space for Victor Vodnik's return from the injured list. He cleared waivers and was sent outright to Albuquerque on September 10. Blach elected free agency on September 30.

=== Texas Rangers ===
On May 1, 2025, Blach signed a minor league contract with the Texas Rangers. He made 12 starts for the rookie-level Arizona Complex League Rangers and Triple-A Round Rock Express, accumulating a 3-0 record and 3.54 ERA with 48 strikeouts over 56 innings of work. Blach elected free agency following the season on November 6.

=== Chicago Cubs ===
On April 14, 2026, Blach signed a minor league contract with the Chicago Cubs. On May 17, the Cubs selected Blach's contract, adding him to their active roster. He made one appearance for the team, recording a scoreless inning against the Milwaukee Brewers on May 18. The following day, Blach was designated for assignment by the Cubs. He cleared waivers and was sent outright to the Triple-A Iowa Cubs on May 22. However, Blach rejected the assignment and elected free agency two days later. On May 26, Blach re-signed with the Cubs on a new minor league contract. He made 15 appearances (including nine starts) for Iowa, compiling a 5–5 record and 6.36 ERA with 42 strikeouts over 58 innings of work. Blach was released by Chicago on August 1.
