= Mark Melancon =

American baseball player (born 1985)

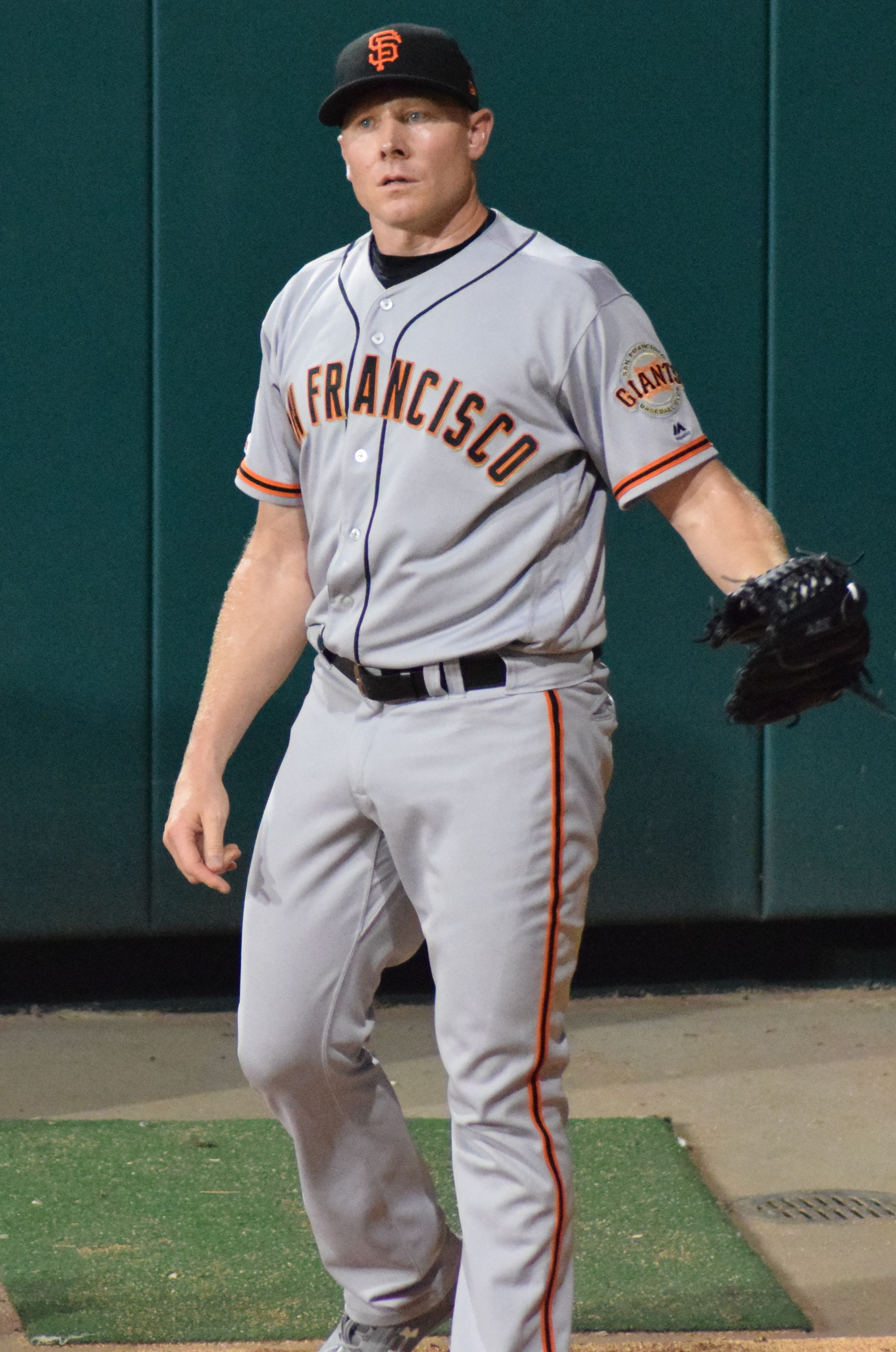
- Melancon with the San Francisco Giants in 2019
- Pitcher
- Born: March 28, 1985 (age 41); Wheat Ridge, Colorado, U.S.
- Batted: Right Threw: Right

MLB debut
- April 26, 2009, for the New York Yankees

Last MLB appearance
- October 2, 2022, for the Arizona Diamondbacks

MLB statistics
- Win–loss record: 37–40
- Earned run average: 2.94
- Strikeouts: 643
- Saves: 262
- Stats at Baseball Reference

Teams
- New York Yankees (2009–2010); Houston Astros (2010–2011); Boston Red Sox (2012); Pittsburgh Pirates (2013–2016); Washington Nationals (2016); San Francisco Giants (2017–2019); Atlanta Braves (2019–2020); San Diego Padres (2021); Arizona Diamondbacks (2022)

Career highlights and awards
- 4× All-Star (2013, 2015, 2016, 2021); NL Reliever of the Year (2015); 2× NL saves leader (2015, 2021)
Medals
Men's baseball
Representing United States
World Baseball Classic
Gold medal – first place	2017 Los Angeles	Team

Mark David Melancon (/məˈlænsən/ mə-LAN-sən; born March 28, 1985) is an American former professional baseball pitcher and current coach. He played in Major League Baseball (MLB) for the New York Yankees, Houston Astros, Boston Red Sox, Pittsburgh Pirates, Washington Nationals, San Francisco Giants, Atlanta Braves, San Diego Padres, and Arizona Diamondbacks. Melancon was drafted by the New York Yankees in the ninth round of the 2006 MLB draft. He made his MLB debut in 2009. He led the National League in saves in 2015, and won the Trevor Hoffman Award that year. Melancon was an MLB All-Star in 2013, 2015, 2016, and 2021.

== Early years ==
Melancon was born in Wheat Ridge, Colorado, and attended Golden High School, where he lettered all four years in baseball, basketball and three times in football. He was also named to several All-State teams in these three sports and helped win a Baseball State Championship in 2003. He was also a member of the National Honor Society.

Melancon was drafted by the Los Angeles Dodgers in the 30th round of the 2003 MLB draft. He declined the offer so that he could attend the University of Arizona.

== College career ==
As a member of the Arizona Wildcats baseball team, Melancon appeared in 29 games (a single-season freshman record) and played in 5 post-season games. He pitched in 10 games for the United States national baseball team that summer, and also played summer league baseball for the Duluth Huskies of the Northwoods League. In his sophomore year he worked as a closing pitcher, achieving 11 saves (a single-season record) in 34 appearances. He played a shortened season in 2006 due to a strained elbow ligament, and had a college career total of 18 saves.

== Professional career ==
=== Draft and minor leagues ===
The New York Yankees selected Melancon in the ninth round of the 2006 MLB draft. Melancon pitched for the Staten Island Yankees of the Class A-Short Season New York–Penn League in 2006. He missed the entire 2007 season after having Tommy John surgery in October 2006.

In 2008, he pitched for three of the Yankees minor league affiliates: the Single-A Tampa Yankees, Double-A Trenton Thunder and Triple-A Scranton/Wilkes-Barre Yankees, going 8–1 with a 2.27 ERA in 41 relief appearances, holding batters to a .202 batting average. Following the season, Baseball America rated him the organization's ninth best prospect.

=== New York Yankees ===
Melancon was called up to MLB for the first time on April 25, 2009. He made his MLB debut as a relief pitcher against the Boston Red Sox on April 26, pitching two scoreless innings.

He was then optioned back to Triple-A team Scranton/Wilkes-Barre Yankees on May 8, and recalled back to the Majors on July 9.

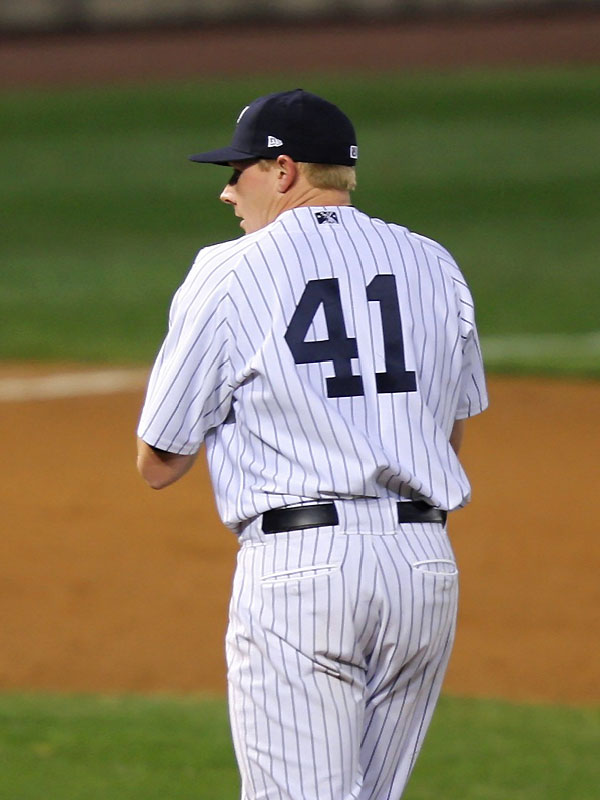
Melancon pitching for the Scranton/Wilkes-Barre Yankees in 2009

Melancon played in 13 games with an 0–1 record and a 3.86 ERA during his time in the Majors in 2009. Although he was not on the 25-man active roster for the postseason, he got his first World Series ring as the Yankees won the World Series over the Phillies.

Melancon started the 2010 season in the minors and made 2 appearances in the Majors accumulating an ERA of 9.00 in 2 relief appearances with the Yankees.

=== Houston Astros ===
Melancon was traded along with Jimmy Paredes to the Houston Astros for Lance Berkman on July 31, 2010. For the rest of 2010 with the Astros, Melancon went 2–0 with a 3.12 ERA in 20 relief appearances. Overall in 2010 combined with two teams, Melancon made 22 total appearances going 2–0 with a 4.22 ERA.

In 2011, Melancon experienced more playing time in the Majors as he appeared in 71 games with an 8–4 record, 20 saves, and a 2.78 ERA. On April 14 against the San Diego Padres, he walked in his only plate appearance of the season (and of his career to date). Thus through the 2020 season he has a perfect 1.000 on-base percentage for his career.

=== Boston Red Sox ===
On December 14, 2011, Melancon was traded to the Boston Red Sox for infielder Jed Lowrie and starter Kyle Weiland. After only his first four appearances in 2012, where his ERA was 49.50, Melancon was optioned to Triple-A Pawtucket on April 18, the day after he gave up six runs, including three home runs, without recording an out against the Texas Rangers. Melancon was recalled June 10 after an injury to Rich Hill. During his time in the Majors with the Red Sox in 2012, Melancon finished the season 0–2 and a 6.20 ERA and 1 save in 41 appearances.

=== Pittsburgh Pirates ===
On December 26, 2012, the Red Sox traded Melancon, Stolmy Pimentel, Jerry Sands and Iván DeJesús Jr. to the Pittsburgh Pirates for Brock Holt and Joel Hanrahan.

Melancon began the 2013 season as a setup reliever, with Jason Grilli as the closer. He was selected as an All Star as a setup man in 2013, the first selection of his career. After Grilli went on the disabled list, Melancon was named the acting closer for the Pirates. Melancon had a 1.39 ERA, a 3–2 record, and 16 saves. In Game 3 of the 2013 National League Division Series, Melancon got his first career postseason win, but the Pirates lost the series to the St. Louis Cardinals in five games.

Melancon avoided arbitration with the Pirates by signing a one-year contract worth $2.95 million for the 2014 season. He started the 2014 season as the Pirates setup reliever. He served as a closer for two weeks while Grilli was on the disabled list. However, Melancon was named the Pirates new permanent closer after Grilli was traded to the Los Angeles Angels of Anaheim in June 2014. Melancon finished his 2014 campaign posting a 3–5 record with a 1.90 ERA and converting 33 saves in 37 opportunities.

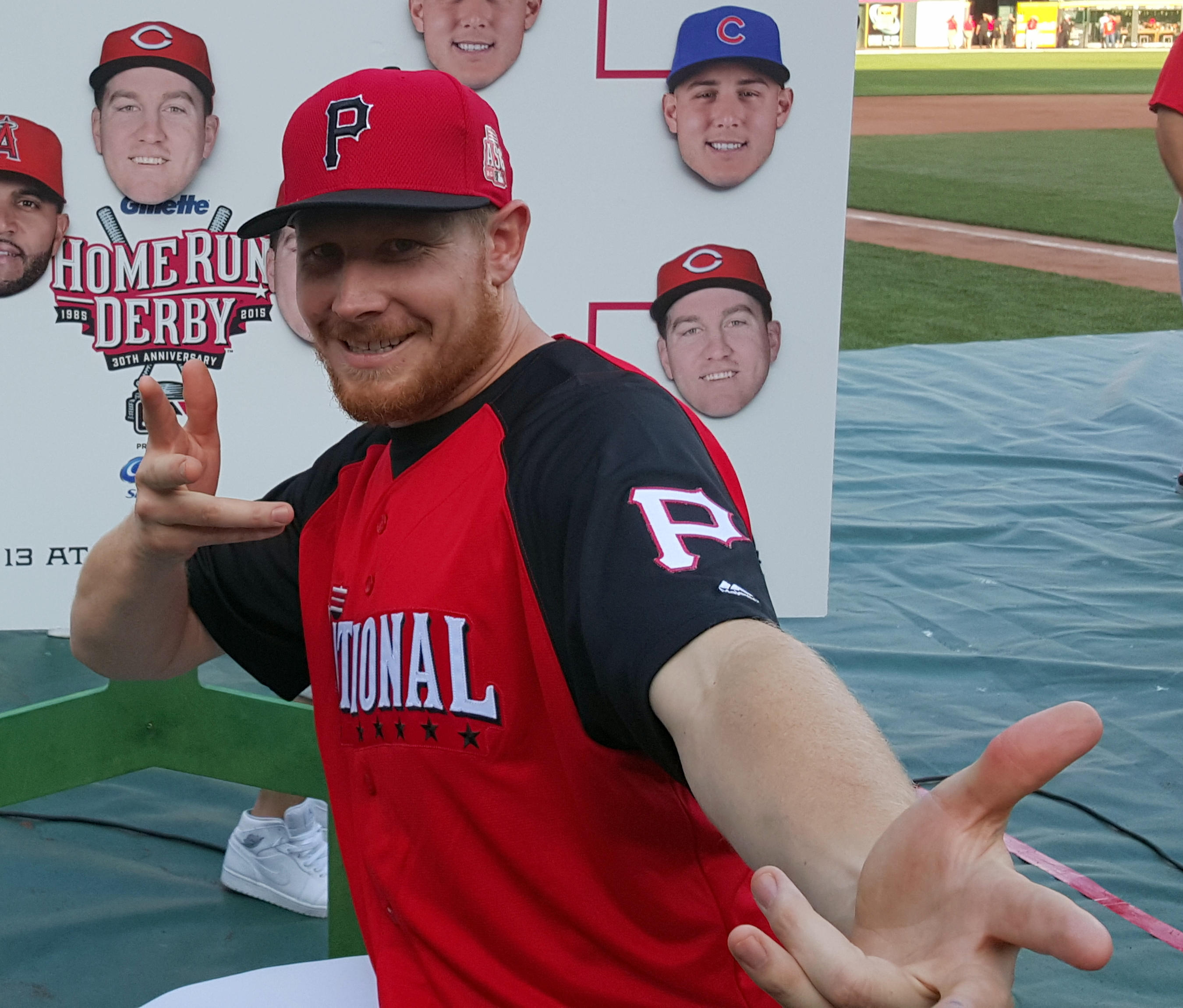
Melancon at the 2015 All-Star Game

The Pirates agreed to pay Melancon $5.4 million for the 2015 season. Starting the 2015 season as the Pirates' closer, Melancon was named an All Star for the second time in his career, and his first as a closer. He recorded his 100th career save against the Kansas City Royals and surpassed Mike Williams to become the all-time Pirates single-season saves leader, recording his 47th of the season on September 19. He finished the season with a major league-leading 51 saves and won the 2015 National League Reliever of the Year Award after the season.

Melancon and the Pirates agreed to a $9.65 million salary for the 2016 season, his final year of arbitration eligibility. Melancon was named to the National League's 2016 All-Star roster, his second straight All-Star appearance and his third overall.

=== Washington Nationals ===
On July 30, 2016, the Pirates traded Melancon to the Washington Nationals for Felipe Vázquez (formerly Rivero) and Taylor Hearn. He secured his first save as a National on August 7 against the San Francisco Giants.

=== San Francisco Giants ===
On December 5, 2016, the San Francisco Giants and Melancon agreed to a four-year, $62 million contract.

Melancon began his tenure with the Giants by blowing a save opportunity on Opening Day 2017 after Madison Bumgarner had pitched well and hit two home runs in the game against the Arizona Diamondbacks. Melancon pitched the ninth inning and allowed two runs with the second run he allowed being a walk off single from Chris Owings. The Giants lost 5–6. After being placed on the DL, Melancon lost the closer position to newly acquired Sam Dyson.

On September 4, 2017, it was announced Melancon would undergo surgery to alleviate chronic exertional compartment syndrome in his right forearm.

Melancon returned in the 2018 season and went 1–4 with a 3.23 ERA over 41 appearances. He performed well after his surgery but produced just a 7.2 K/9, his lowest since first appearing in the majors for the Yankees in 2009. In 2019 for the Giants, Melancon went 4–2 with one save and a 3.50 ERA over 43 appearances.

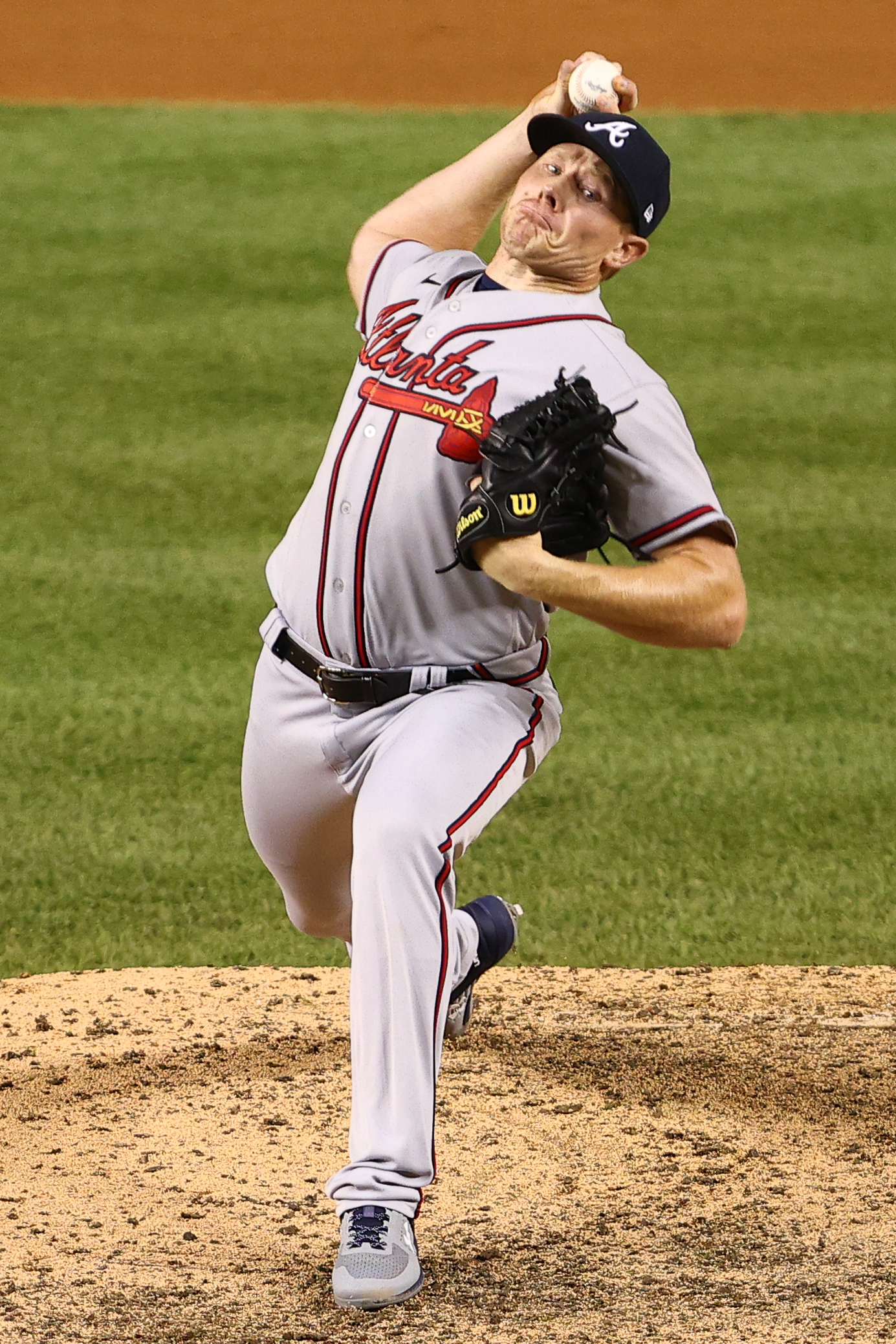
Melancon pitching for the Braves in 2020

=== Atlanta Braves ===
On July 31, 2019, the Giants traded Melancon to the Atlanta Braves for Tristan Beck and Dan Winkler.

In 2019 for the Braves, he was 1–0 with 11 saves and a 3.86 ERA over 23 games.

In 2020, he was 2–1 with 11 saves and a 2.78 ERA over 23 games.

=== San Diego Padres ===
On February 18, 2021, Melancon signed a one-year contract worth $2 million with the San Diego Padres. He was named the Reliever of the Month in the National League for April 2021. He finished the 2021 season with an MLB-leading 39 saves in 45 opportunities.

=== Arizona Diamondbacks ===
On December 1, 2021, Melancon signed a two-year $14 million contract with a 2024 mutual option with the Arizona Diamondbacks. He made 62 appearances for the Diamondbacks in 2022, logging a 3–10 record and 4.66 ERA with 35 strikeouts and 18 saves in 56.0 innings pitched.

Melancon received a platelet-rich plasma injection in his right shoulder after suffering a strain in spring training, and was later placed on the 60-day injured list on April 9, 2023, as the injury cost him the entire 2023 season. The Diamondbacks declined their side of the mutual option on November 5, making Melancon a free agent.

== Coaching career ==
On October 8, 2024, Melancon was announced as the new pitching development coordinator for San Diego State.

== Personal life ==
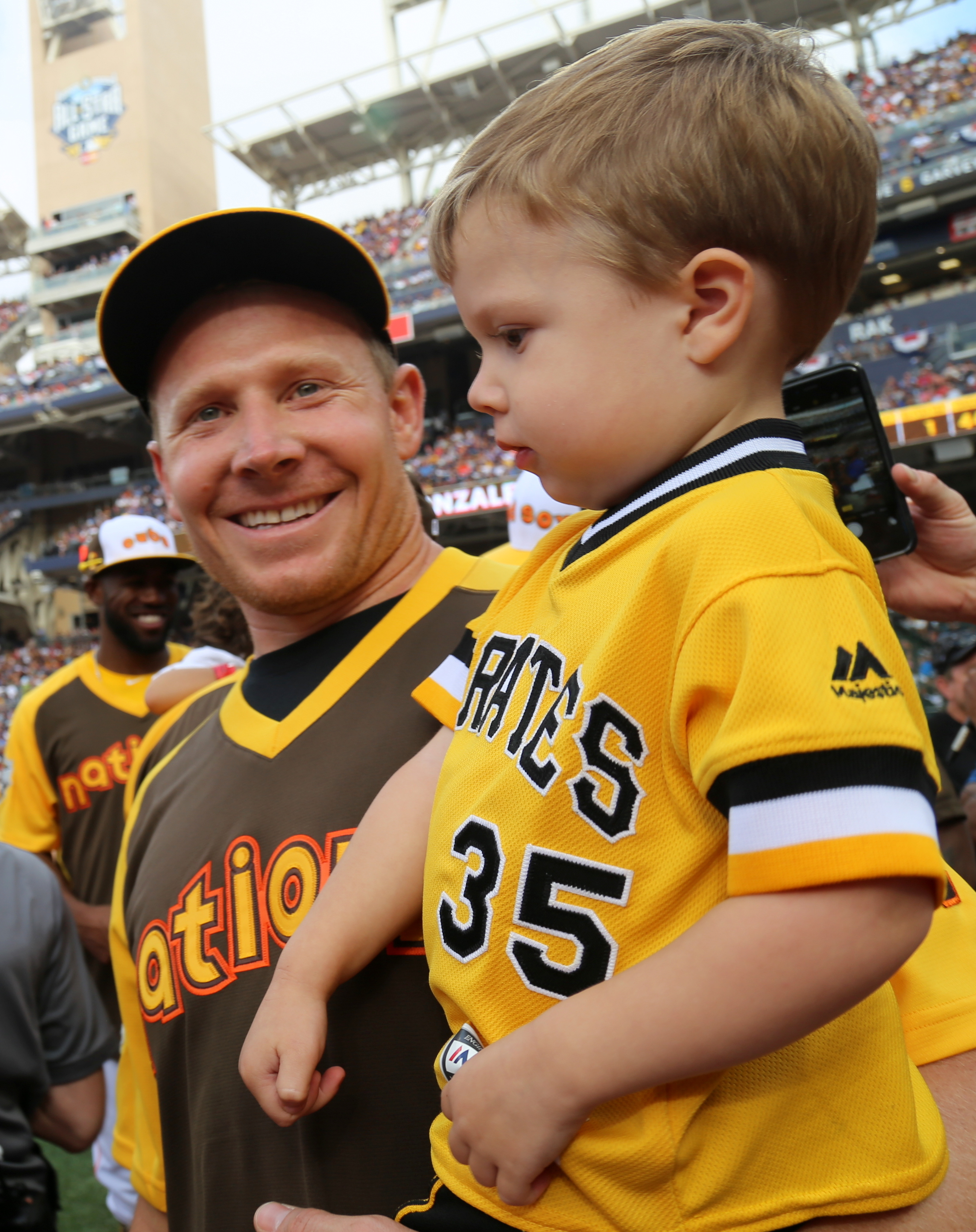
Melancon (left) with his son at the 2016 Major League Baseball Home Run Derby

Melancon and his wife, Mary Catherine, had three children as of 2016.

Melancon owns a turf installation company based in Sarasota, Florida.
