= 2017 San Diego Padres season =

2017 San Diego Padres
- League: National League
- Division: West
- Ballpark: Petco Park
- City: San Diego, California
- Record: 71–91 (.438)
- Divisional place: 4th
- Owners: Ron Fowler
- General managers: A. J. Preller
- Managers: Andy Green
- Television: Fox Sports San Diego (Don Orsillo, Mark Grant, Mike Pomeranz, Mark Sweeney, Jesse Agler); Fox Deportes San Diego (Spanish)
- Radio: KBZT 94.9 FM (Ted Leitner, Jesse Agler); XEMO 860 AM (Spanish) (Eduardo Ortega, Carlos Hernandez, Pedro Gutierrez)

The 2017 San Diego Padres season was the 49th season of the San Diego Padres franchise in Major League Baseball and the Padres' 14th season at Petco Park. The Padres began the season on April 3 at the Los Angeles Dodgers. They ended the season on October 1 at the San Francisco Giants. They finished the season 71–91 to finish in fourth place in the National League West, 33 games behind the Los Angeles Dodgers. They missed the playoffs for the 11th straight year.

== Regular season ==
=== Game log ===
2017 game log: 71–91 (Home: 43–38; Away: 28–53)
April: 11–16 (Home: 5–4; Away: 6–12)

#	Date	Opponent	Score	Win	Loss	Save	Attendance	Record	Streak
1	April 3	@ Dodgers	3–14	Kershaw (1–0)	**Chacín** (0–1)	—	53,701	0—1	L1
2	April 4	@ Dodgers	4–0	**Richard** (1−0)	Maeda (0–1)	—	42,196	1—1	W1
3	April 5	@ Dodgers	1–3	Hill (1–0)	**Cahill** (0–1)	Jansen (1)	38,373	1—2	L1
4	April 6	@ Dodgers	2–10	McCarthy (1–0)	**Weaver** (0–1)	—	36,501	1—3	L2
5	April 7	Giants	7–6	**Torres** (1–0)	Kontos (0–1)	**Maurer** (1)	43,441	2—3	W1
6	April 8	Giants	2–1	**Chacín** (1–1)	Bumgarner (0–1)	**Buchter** (1)	42,397	3—3	W2
7	April 9	Giants	3–5	Cueto (2–0)	**Richard** (1−1)	Melancon (1)	40,537	3—4	L1
8	April 10	@ Rockies	5–3	**Díaz** (1–0)	Chatwood (0−2)	—	20,504	4—4	W1
9	April 11	@ Rockies	2–3	Senzatela (1−0)	**Díaz** (1–1)	Holland (5)	20,664	4—5	L1
10	April 12	@ Rockies	6–0	**Lee** (1−0)	Freeland (1−1)	—	20,968	5—5	W1
11	April 14	@ Braves	2–5	Teherán (1−0)	**Chacín** (1–2)	Johnson (2)	41,149	5—6	L1
12	April 15	@ Braves	2–4	Dickey (1−1)	**Richard** (1−2)	Johnson (3)	41,149	5—7	L2
13	April 16	@ Braves	2–9	Colón (1−1)	**Cahill** (0–2)	—	37,147	5—8	L3
14	April 17	@ Braves	4–5	Johnson (2–0)	**Maurer** (0–1)	—	24,516	5—9	L4
15	April 18	D-backs	2–11	Miller (2–1)	**Cosart** (0–1)	—	19,869	5–10	L5
16	April 19	D-backs	1–0	**Chacín** (2–2)	Greinke (1–2)	**Maurer** (2)	17,089	6–10	W1
17	April 20	D-backs	4–1	**Richard** (2–2)	Corbin (1–3)	**Maurer** (3)	17,831	7–10	W2
18	April 21	Marlins	5–3	**Cahill** (1–2)	Phelps (2–2)	—	30,413	8–10	W3
19	April 22	Marlins	3–6 (11)	Ziegler (1–0)	**Torres** (1–1)	Ramos (3)	39,319	8–11	L1
20	April 23	Marlins	3–7	Koehler (1–1)	**Stammen** (0–1)	—	26,070	8–12	L2
21	April 24	@ D-backs	6–7	Greinke (2–2)	**Chacín** (2–3)	Rodney (6)	14,758	8–13	L3
22	April 25	@ D-backs	3–9	Corbin (2–3)	**Richard** (2–3)	—	17,531	8–14	L4
23	April 26	@ D-backs	8–5	**Buchter** (1–0)	Rodney (1–1)	**Maurer** (4)	12,215	9–14	W1
24	April 27	@ D-backs	2–6	Walker (3–1)	**Weaver** (0–2)	—	15,452	9–15	L1
25	April 28	@ Giants	3–4	Law (3–0)	**Buchter** (1–1)	Melancon (5)	41,436	9–16	L2
26	April 29	@ Giants	12–4	**Chacín** (3–3)	Stratton (0–1)	—	42,862	10–16	W1
27	April 30	@ Giants	5–2 (12)	**Buchter** (2–1)	Kontos (0–2)	**Torres** (1)	41,989	11–16	W2

May: 11–17 (Home: 7–10; Away: 4–7)

#	Date	Opponent	Score	Win	Loss	Save	Attendance	Record	Streak
28	May 2	Rockies	6–2	**Cahill** (2–2)	Chatwood (2–4)	—	18,910	12–16	W3
29	May 3	Rockies	3–11	Senzatela (4–1)	**Weaver** (0–3)		16,487	12–17	L1
30	May 4	Rockies	2–3 (11)	Qualls (1–0)	**Hand** (0–1)	Holland (12)	16,356	12–18	L2
31	May 5	Dodgers	2–8	Romo (1–1)	**Torres** (1–2)	Fields (1)	34,320	12–19	L3
32	May 6	Dodgers	2–10	Kershaw (5–2)	**Richard** (2–4)	—	36,337	12–20	L4
—	May 7	Dodgers	**Postponed (rain)** (Makeup date: Sept. 2)						
33	May 8	Rangers	5–1	**Cahill** (3–2)	Martinez (0–2)	—	17,756	13–20	W1
34	May 9	Rangers	0–11	Griffin (4–0)	**Weaver** (0–4)	—	14,224	13–21	L1
35	May 10	@ Rangers	3–4	Jeffress (1–2)	**Hand** (0–2)	Bush (2)	24,350	13–22	L2
36	May 11	@ Rangers	2–5	Dyson (1–4)	**Maurer** (0–2)	—	22,405	13–23	L3
37	May 12	@ White Sox	6–3	**Chacín** (4–3)	González (3–3)	**Maurer** (5)	24,194	14–23	W1
38	May 13	@ White Sox	4–5	Robertson (2–0)	**Hand** (0–3)	—	29,111	14–24	L1
39	May 14	@ White Sox	3–9	Ynoa (1–0)	**Buchter** (2–2)	—	22,518	14–25	L2
40	May 15	Brewers	6–5	**Torres** (2–2)	Drake (2–1)	—	15,866	15–25	W1
41	May 16	Brewers	2–6	Nelson (2–2)	**Richard** (2–5)	—	16,657	15–26	L1
42	May 17	Brewers	1–2	Barnes (1–0)	**Maurer** (0–3)	Knebel (2)	17,356	15–27	L2
43	May 18	Brewers	2–4	Davies (5–2)	**Quackenbush** (0–1)	Knebel (3)	14,359	15–28	L3
44	May 19	D-backs	1–10	Walker (4–3)	**Weaver** (0–5)	Delgado (1)	22,187	15–29	L4
45	May 20	D-backs	1–9	Ray (3–3)	**Perdomo** (0–1)	—	29,696	15–30	L5
46	May 21	D-backs	5–1	**Richard** (3–5)	Godley (1–1)	—	27,198	16–30	W1
47	May 23	@ Mets	3–9	Harvey (3–3)	**Chacín** (4–4)	—	24,237	16–31	L1
48	May 24	@ Mets	6–5	**Buchter** (3–2)	Smoker (0–2)	**Hand** (1)	23,933	17–31	W1
49	May 25	@ Mets	4–3	**Lamet** (1–0)	Montero (0–4)	**Hand** (2)	24,131	18–31	W2
50	May 26	@ Nationals	1–5	Scherzer (5–3)	**Perdomo** (0–2)	Glover (4)	28,606	18–32	L1
51	May 27	@ Nationals	0–3	Strasburg (6–1)	**Richard** (3–6)	Glover (5)	37,357	18–33	L2
52	May 28	@ Nationals	5–3	**Yates** (1–0)	Ross (2–1)	**Maurer** (6)	30,243	19–33	W1
53	May 29	Cubs	5–2	**Torres** (3–2)	Hendricks (4–3)	**Maurer** (7)	41,414	20–33	W2
54	May 30	Cubs	6–2	**Lamet** (2-0)	**Butler (2–1)**	—	33,232	21-33	W3
55	May 31	Cubs	2–1	**Hand** (1–3)	**Uehara** (1–3)	**Maurer** (8)	23,995	22-33	W4

June: 11–14 (Home: 9–7; Away: 2–7)

#	Date	Opponent	Score	Win	Loss	Save	Attendance	Record	Streak
56	June 2	Rockies	8–5	**Richard** (4–6)	Marquez (4–3)	**Maurer** (9)	20,932	23–33	W5
57	June 3	Rockies	1–10	Chatwood (5–7)	**Chacín** (4–5)	—	20,996	23–34	L1
58	June 4	Rockies	1–3	Hoffman (3–0)	**Cosart** (0–2)	Holland (21)	24,763	23–35	L2
59	June 6	@ D-backs	2–10	Ray (6–3)	**Lamet** (2–1)	—	25,883	23–36	L5
60	June 7	@ D-backs	4–7	Greinke (8–3)	**Perdomo** (0–3)	Rodney (15)	22,079	23–37	L4
61	June 8	@ D-backs	3–15	Corbin (5–6)	**Richard** (4–7)	—	21,340	23–38	L5
62	June 9	Royals	6–3	**Chacín** (5–5)	Strahm (1–3)	**Maurer** (10)	23,055	24–38	W1
63	June 10	Royals	6–12	Wood (1–2)	**Hand** (1–4)	—	26,107	24–39	L1
64	June 11	Royals	3–8	Junis (2–0)	**Lamet** (2–2)	—	25,599	24–40	L2
65	June 12	Reds	9–3	**Perdomo** (1–3)	Arroyo (3–5)	—	17,006	25–40	W1
66	June 13	Reds	6–2	**Richard** (5–7)	Feldman (5–5)	**Maurer** (11)	20,463	26–40	W2
67	June 14	Reds	4–2	**Chacín** (6–5)	Lorenzen (3–2)	**Maurer** (12)	20,386	27–40	W3
68	June 16	@ Brewers	5–6 (10)	Hughes (3–1)	**Buchter** (3–3)	—	31,161	27–41	L1
69	June 17	@ Brewers	7–5 (11)	**Torres** (4–2)	Drake (2–2)	**Maton** (1)	34,312	28–41	W1
70	June 18	@ Brewers	1–2	Nelson (5–3)	**Perdomo** (1–4)	—	34,518	28–42	L1
71	June 19	@ Cubs	2–3	Rondon (2–1)	**Yates** (1–1)	Davis (14)	40,802	28–43	L2
72	June 20	@ Cubs	0–4	Montgomery (1–3)	**Chacin** (6–6)	—	41,607	28–44	L3
73	June 21	@ Cubs	3–2	**Maton** (1–0)	Uehara (2–4)	**Maurer** (13)	41,708	29–44	W1
74	June 23	Tigers	1–0	**Perdomo** (2–4)	Fulmer (6–6)	**Maurer** (14)	25,477	30–44	W2
75	June 24	Tigers	7–3	**Yates** (2–1)	Greene (1–2)	—	31,749	31–44	W3
76	June 25	Tigers	5–7	Rondón (1–1)	**Maurer** (0–4)	**J. Wilson** (6)	29,595	31–45	L1
77	June 27	Braves	0–3	Newcomb (1–2)	**Chacín** (6–7)	Johnson (16)	20,667	31–46	L2
78	June 29	Braves	7–4	**Perdomo** (3–4)	Colón (2–8)	**Maurer** (15)	19,312	32–46	W1
79	June 29	Braves	6–0	'**Lamet** (2–2)	García (2–6)	—	20,936	33–46	W2
80	June 30	Dodgers	4–10	Wood (9–0)	**Richard** (5–8)	—	39,254	33–47	L1

July: 14–11 (Home: 7–5; Away: 7–6)

#	Date	Opponent	Score	Win	Loss	Save	Attendance	Record	Streak
81	July 1	Dodgers	0–8	Hill (5–4)	**Overton** (0–1)	—	40,683	33–48	L2
82	July 2	Dodgers	5–3	**Chacín** (7–7)	Maeda (6–4)	**Maurer** (16)	41,604	34–48	W1
83	July 4	@ Indians	1–0	**Torres** (5–2)	Kluber (7–3)	**Maurer** (17)	33,869	35–48	W2
84	July 5	@ Indians	6–2	**Perdomo** (4–4)	Bauer (7–7)	–	18,765	36–48	W3
85	July 6	@ Indians	2–11	Tomlin (5–9)	**Lamet** (3–3)	—	19,057	36–49	L1
86	July 7	@ Phillies	4–3	**Hand** (2–4)	Neris (2–3)	**Maurer** (18)	38,533	37–49	W1
87	July 8	@ Phillies	2–1	**Chacín** (8–7)	Nola (6–6)	**Maurer** (19)	33,216	38–49	W2
88	July 9	@ Phillies	1–7	Eickhoff (1–7)	**Cahill** (3–3)	—	21,184	38–50	L1
**88th All-Star Game in Miami, Florida**
89	July 14	Giants	4–5	Gearrin (3–2)	**Richard** (5–9)	Dyson (4)	34,970	38–51	L2
90	July 15	Giants	5–3	**Maurer** (1–4)	Gearrin (3–3)	—	36,266	39–51	W1
91	July 16	Giants	7–1	**Cahill** (4–3)	Samardzija (4–11)	—	30,561	40–51	W2
92	July 17	@ Rockies	6–9	Márquez (7–4)	**Perdomo** (4–5)	**Holland** (29)	37,561	40–52	L1
93	July 18	@ Rockies	7–9	Senzatela (10–3)	**Lamet** (3–4)	Holland (30)	40,101	40–53	L2
94	July 19	@ Rockies	4–18	Gray (3–1)	**Richard** (5–10)	—	37,128	40–54	L3
95	July 20	@ Giants	5–2	**Chacín** (9–7)	Bumgarner (0–4)	**Maurer** (20)	41,166	41–54	W1
96	July 21	@ Giants	12–9 (11)	Maton (2–0)	**Kontos** (0–4)	—	41,145	42–54	W2
97	July 22	@ Giants	4–5 (12)	Osich (3–1)	**Quackenbush** (0–2)	—	40,936	42–55	L1
98	July 23	@ Giants	5–2	Lamet (4–4)	Blach (6–6)	**Hand** (3)	41,372	43–55	W1
99	July 24	Mets	3–5	deGrom (12–3)	**Richard** (5–11)	Reed (17)	23,325	43–56	L1
100	July 25	Mets	5–6	Lugo (5–2)	**Torres** (5–3)	Reed (18)	28,024	43–57	L2
101	July 26	Mets	6–3	**Chacín** (10–7)	Matz (2–4)	**Hand** (4)	19,281	44–57	W1
102	July 27	Mets	7–5	**Perdomo** (5–5)	Flexen (0–1)	**Hand** (5)	26,262	45–57	W2
103	July 28	Pirates	3–2	**Wood** (2–3)	Hudson (2–5)	**Hand** (6)	24,215	46–57	W3
104	July 29	Pirates	4–2	**Lamet** (5–4)	Nova (10–8)	**Yates** (1)	37,286	47–57	W4
105	July 30	Pirates	1–7	Cole (9–7)	**Richard** (5–12)	—	30,267	47–58	L1

August: 11–16 (Home: 6–5; Away: 5–11)

#	Date	Opponent	Score	Win	Loss	Save	Attendance	Record	Streak
106	August 1	Twins	3–0	**Chacín** (11–7)	Berríos (9–5)	**Hand** (7)	24,491	48–58	W1
107	August 2	Twins	2–5	Santana (12–7)	**Perdomo** (5–6)	—	23,806	48–59	L1
108	August 4	@ Pirates	6–10	Schugel (2–0)	**Yates** (2–2)	—	32,243	48–60	L2
109	August 5	@ Pirates	5–2	**Lamet** (6–4)	Cole (9–8)	**Hand** (8)	31,817	49–60	W1
110	August 6	@ Pirates	4–5 (12)	Neverauskas (1–0)	**Baumann** (0–1)	—	34,175	49–61	L1
111	August 7	@ Reds	3–11	Wood (1–4)	**Chacín** (11–8)	—	16,240	49–62	L2
112	August 8	@ Reds	7–3	**Perdomo** (6–6)	Romano (2–4)	—	13,683	50–62	W1
113	August 9	@ Reds	3–8	Wojciechowski (3–1)	**Wood** (2–4)	—	15,450	50–63	L1
114	August 10	@ Reds	3–10	Storen (3–2)	**Yates** (2–3)	—	14,915	50–64	L2
115	August 11	@ Dodgers	4–3	**Torres** (6–3)	Stripling (1–4)	**Hand** (9)	52,898	51–64	W2
116	August 12	@ Dodgers	3–6	Watson (6–4)	**Stammen** (0–2)	Jansen (31)	53,230	51–65	L1
117	August 13	@ Dodgers	4–6	Maeda (11–4)	**Perdomo** (6–7)	Jansen (32)	46,128	51–66	L2
118	August 14	Phillies	7–4	**Torres** (7–3)	Pinto (1–1)	**Hand** (10)	20,873	52–66	W1
119	August 15	Phillies	8–4	**Lamet** (7–4)	Leiter (1–3)	—	23,368	53–66	W2
120	August 16	Phillies	3–0	**Richard** (6–12)	Pivetta (4–8)	—	21,564	54–66	W3
121	August 17	Nationals	1–2	Jackson (4–2)	**Yates** (2–4)	Doolittle (13)	22,097	54–67	L1
122	August 18	Nationals	1–7	Blanton (2–2)	**Perdomo** (6–8)	—	26,747	54–68	L2
123	August 19	Nationals	3–1	**Wood** (3–4)	Strasburg (10–4)	**Hand** (11)	31,590	55–68	W1
124	August 20	Nationals	1–4	González (12–5)	**Lamet** (7–5)	Doolittle (14)	29,292	55–69	L1
125	August 22	@ Cardinals	12–4	**Stammen** (1–2)	Bowman (3–5)	—	38,767	56–69	W1
126	August 23	@ Cardinals	2–6	Weaver (2–1)	**Chacin** (11–9)	—	38,762	56–70	L1
127	August 24	@ Cardinals	4–3	**Yates** (3–4)	Tuivailala (3–2)	**Hand** (12)	38,726	57–70	W1
128	August 25	@ Marlins	6–8	McGowan (8–1)	**Yates** (3–5)	Ziegler (9)	22,489	57–71	L1
129	August 26	@ Marlins	1–2 (11)	Tazawa (3–3)	**Torres** (7–4)	—	19,963	57–72	L2
130	August 27	@ Marlins	2–6	Barraclough (5–1)	**Richard** (6–13)	—	23,275	57–73	L3
131	August 28	Giants	0–3	Samardzija (9–12)	**Chacín** (11–10)	—	20,594	57–74	L4
134	August 29	Giants	6–3	**Perdomo** (7–8)	Moore (4–13)	**Hand** (13)	19,631	58–74	W1
133	August 30	Giants	5–0	**Stammen** (2–2)	Blach (8–11)	**Hand** (14)	19,691	59–74	W2

September/October: 12–17 (Home: 8–7; Away: 4–10)

#	Date	Opponent	Score	Win	Loss	Save	Attendance	Record	Streak
134	September 1	Dodgers	0–1	Kershaw (16–2)	**Lamet** (7–6)	Jansen (36)	36,767	59–75	L1
135	September 2 (1)	Dodgers	6–5	**Hand** (3–4)	Báez (3–3)	—	39,140	60–75	W1
136	September 2 (2)	Dodgers	7–2	**Baumann** (1–1)	Darvish (2–2)	—	42,130	61–75	W2
137	September 3	Dodgers	6–4	**Chacín** (12–10)	Wood (14–2)	**Hand** (15)	33,949	62–75	W3
138	September 4	Cardinals	0–2	Martinez (11–10)	**Perdomo** (7–9)	—	25,028	62–76	L1
139	September 5	Cardinals	4–8	Wacha (11–7)	**Wood** (3–5)	—	17,806	62–77	L2
140	September 6	Cardinals	1–3	Sherriff (1–1)	**Lamet** (7–7)	Lyons (2)	21,411	62–78	L3
141	September 7	Cardinals	3–0	**Richard** (7–13)	Lynn (10–7)	**Hand** (16)	21,334	63–78	W1
142	September 8	@ D-backs	10–6	**Lyles** (1–2)	Corbin (13–12)	—	27,988	64–78	W2
143	September 9	@ D-backs	8–7	**Maton** (3–0)	Rodney (4–4)	**Hand** (17)	34,156	65–78	W3
144	September 10	@ D-backs	2–3	Ray (13–5)	**Perdomo** (7–10)	Bradley (1)	23,854	65–79	L1
145	September 12	@ Twins	0–16	Gibson (10–10)	**Wood** (3–6)	—	28,852	65–80	L2
146	September 13	@ Twins	1–3 (10)	Belisle (2–2)	**Maton** (3–1)	—	20,018	65–81	L3
147	September 15	@ Rockies	1–6	Chatwood (8–12)	**Richard** (7–14)	—	39,243	65–82	L4
148	September 16	@ Rockies	0–16	Anderson (5–5)	**Lyles** (1–3)	—	48,247	65–83	L5
149	September 17	@ Rockies	4–3	**Yates** (4–5)	Holland (3–6)	**Hand** (18)	34,634	66–83	W1
150	September 18	D-backs	4–2	**Perdomo** (8–10)	Corbin (14–13)	**Hand** (19)	20,199	67–83	W2
151	September 19	D-backs	6–2	**Wood** (4–6)	Godley (8–8)	—	20,101	68–83	W3
152	September 20	D-backs	7–13	Sherfy (2–0)	**Stammen** (2–3)	—	25,797	68–84	L1
153	September 21	Rockies	3–0	**Richard** (8–14)	Anderson (5–6)	**Hand** (20)	30,944	69–84	W1
154	September 22	Rockies	1–4	Gray (9–4)	**Lyles** (1–4)	Holland (41)	25,273	69–85	L1
155	September 23	Rockies	5–0	**Chacín** (13–10)	Bettis (1–4)	—	33,899	70–85	W1
156	September 24	Rockies	4–8	Márquez (11–7)	**Perdomo** (8–11)	—	28,339	70–86	L1
157	September 25	@ Dodgers	3–9	Darvish (10–12)	**Wood** (4–7)	—	49,419	70–87	L2
158	September 26	@ Dodgers	2–9	Wood (16–3)	**Lamet** (7–8)	—	47,432	70–88	L3
159	September 27	@ Dodgers	0–10	Hill (12–8)	**Richard** (8–15)	—	47,273	70–89	L4
160	September 29	@ Giants	0–8	Stratton (4–4)	**Lyles** (1–5)	—	39,863	70–90	L5
161	September 30	@ Giants	3–2	**Baumann** (2–1)	Dyson (3–4)	**Hand** (21)	40,394	71–90	W1
162	October 1	@ Giants	4–5	Strickland (3–3)	**Maton** (3–2)	—	38,847	71–91	L1

Legend: = Win = Loss = Postponement
Bold = Padres team member

=== Season standings ===
==== National League West ====
NL West
Team	W	L	Pct.	GB	Home	Road
Los Angeles Dodgers	104	58	.642	—	57‍–‍24	47‍–‍34
Arizona Diamondbacks	93	69	.574	11	52‍–‍29	41‍–‍40
Colorado Rockies	87	75	.537	17	46‍–‍35	41‍–‍40
San Diego Padres	71	91	.438	33	43‍–‍38	28‍–‍53
San Francisco Giants	64	98	.395	40	38‍–‍43	26‍–‍55

==== National League Wildcard ====
Division leaders
Team	W	L	Pct.
Los Angeles Dodgers	104	58	.642
Washington Nationals	97	65	.599
Chicago Cubs	92	70	.568

Wild Card teams (Top 2 teams qualify for postseason)
Team	W	L	Pct.	GB
Arizona Diamondbacks	93	69	.574	+6
Colorado Rockies	87	75	.537	—
Milwaukee Brewers	86	76	.531	1
St. Louis Cardinals	83	79	.512	4
Miami Marlins	77	85	.475	10
Pittsburgh Pirates	75	87	.463	12
Atlanta Braves	72	90	.444	15
San Diego Padres	71	91	.438	16
New York Mets	70	92	.432	17
Cincinnati Reds	68	94	.420	19
Philadelphia Phillies	66	96	.407	21
San Francisco Giants	64	98	.395	23

==== Record vs. opponents ====
2017 National League record Source: MLB Standings Grid – 2017
Team	AZ	ATL	CHC	CIN	COL	LAD	MIA	MIL	NYM	PHI	PIT	SD	SF	STL	WSH	AL
Arizona	—	2–4	3–3	3–3	11–8	11–8	3–4	4–3	6–1	6–1	4–3	11–8	12–7	3–4	2–4	12–8
Atlanta	4–2	—	1–6	3–3	3–4	3–4	11–8	4–2	7–12	6–13	2–5	5–2	4–3	1–5	9–10	9–11
Chicago	3–3	6–1	—	12–7	2–5	2–4	4–3	10–9	4–2	4–3	10–9	2–4	4–3	14–5	3–4	12–8
Cincinnati	3–3	3–3	7–12	—	3–4	0–6	2–5	8–11	3–4	4–2	13–6	3–4	4–3	9–10	1–6	5–15
Colorado	8–11	4–3	5–2	4–3	—	10–9	2–4	4–3	3–3	5–2	3–3	12–7	12–7	2–4	3–4	10–10
Los Angeles	8–11	4–3	4–2	6–0	9–10	—	6–1	3–3	7–0	4–3	6–1	13–6	11–8	4–3	3–3	16–4
Miami	4–3	8–11	3–4	5–2	4–2	1–6	—	2–4	12–7	8–11	3–4	5–1	5–1	2–5	6–13	9–11
Milwaukee	3–4	2–4	9–10	11–8	3–4	3–3	4–2	—	5–2	3–3	9–10	5–2	3–4	11–8	4–3	11–9
New York	1–6	12–7	2–4	4–3	3–3	0–7	7–12	2–5	—	12–7	3–3	3–4	5–1	3–4	6–13	7–13
Philadelphia	1–6	13–6	3–4	2–4	2–5	3–4	11–8	3–3	7–12	—	2–5	1–5	4–3	1–5	8–11	5–15
Pittsburgh	3–4	5–2	9–10	6–13	3–3	1–6	4–3	10–9	3–3	5–2	—	3–3	1–5	8–11	4–3	10–10
San Diego	8–11	2–5	4–2	4–3	7–12	6–13	1–5	2–5	4–3	5–1	3–3	—	12–7	3–4	2–5	8–12
San Francisco	7–12	3–4	3–4	3–4	7–12	8–11	1–5	4–3	1–5	3–4	5–1	7–12	—	3–4	1–5	8–12
St. Louis	4–3	5–1	5–14	10–9	4–2	3–4	5–2	8–11	4–3	5–1	11–8	4–3	4–3	—	3–3	8–12
Washington	4–2	10–9	4–3	6–1	4–3	3–3	13–6	3–4	13–6	11–8	3–4	5–2	5–1	3–3	—	10–10

== Roster ==
2017 San Diego Padres
Roster
Pitchers: 77 Buddy Baumann; 12 Christian Bethancourt; 40 Ryan Buchter; 38 Trevor Cahill; 56 Carter Capps; 46 Jhoulys Chacín; 55 Jarred Cosart; 43 Miguel Díaz; 47 Jake Esch; 52 Brad Hand; 64 Dinelson Lamet; 57 Zach Lee; 49 Kyle Lloyd; 27 Jordan Lyles; 88 Phil Maton; 37 Brandon Maurer; 60 Cory Mazzoni; 38 Kyle McGrath; 54 Tim Melville; 60 Dillon Overton; 61 Luis Perdomo; 59 Kevin Quackenbush; 3 Clayton Richard; 63 José Ruiz; 34 Craig Stammen; 76 José Torres; 50 José Valdez; 27 Jered Weaver; 37 Travis Wood; 39 Kirby Yates	Catchers: 58 Rocky Gale; 18 Austin Hedges; 44 Héctor Sánchez; 21 Luis Torrens; Infielders: 20 Carlos Asuaje; 8 Erick Aybar; 9 Dusty Coleman; 12 Chase d'Arnaud; 4 Wil Myers; 2 Luis Sardiñas; 11 Ryan Schimpf; 26 Yangervis Solarte; 15 Cory Spangenberg; 22 Christian Villanueva	Outfielders: 32 Jabari Blash; 33 Franchy Cordero; 17 Allen Córdoba; 16 Travis Jankowski; 7 Manuel Margot; 2 José Pirela; 10 Hunter Renfroe; 23 Matt Szczur	Manager: 14 Andy Green; Coaches: 36 Darren Balsley (pitching); 81 Griffin Benedict (bullpen catcher); 45 Doug Bochtler (bullpen); 48 Justin Hatcher (bullpen catcher); 30 Glenn Hoffman (third base); 67 Jonathan Mathews (outfield); 25 Mark McGwire (bench); -- Luis Ortiz (hitting); 1 Ramón Vázquez (infield); 28 Johnny Washington (first base); 22 Alan Zinter (hitting)

== Player statistics ==
Both tables are sortable.

=== Batting ===
(Final Stats)
Players in bold are on the active roster as of the 2022 season.

Note: G = Games played; AB = At bats; R = Runs; H = Hits; 2B = Doubles; 3B = Triples; HR = Home runs; RBI = Runs batted in; SB = Stolen bases; BB = Walks; K = Strikeouts; Avg. = Batting average; OBP = On-base percentage; SLG = Slugging percentage;

Player	G	AB	R	H	2B	3B	HR	RBI	SB	BB	K	AVG	OBP	SLG	TB
Carlos Asuaje	89	307	28	83	14	1	4	21	0	28	76	.270	.334	.362	111
Erick Aybar	108	333	37	78	15	1	7	22	11	28	57	.234	.300	.348	116
**Christian Bethancourt**	8	7	0	1	0	0	0	0	0	0	3	.143	.143	.143	1
Jabari Blash	61	164	24	35	6	0	5	16	1	28	66	.213	.333	.341	56
Trevor Cahill	11	13	1	4	1	0	0	2	0	1	3	.308	.357	.385	5
**Jhoulys Chacín**	34	54	0	12	2	0	0	4	1	0	11	.222	.222	.259	14
Dusty Coleman	27	66	6	15	3	0	4	9	1	2	33	.227	.268	.455	30
**Franchy Cordero**	30	92	15	21	3	3	3	9	1	6	44	.228	.276	.424	39
Allen Córdoba	100	202	17	42	2	2	4	15	2	18	54	.208	.282	.297	60
Jarred Cosart	7	4	0	0	0	0	0	0	0	1	2	.000	.000	.000	0
Chase d'Arnaud	22	49	5	7	2	0	1	3	5	2	17	.143	.176	.245	12
Miguel Díaz	31	3	0	0	0	0	0	0	0	0	0	.000	.000	.000	0
Rocky Gale	3	10	1	1	0	0	1	2	0	0	2	.100	.100	.400	4
**Brad Hand**	66	1	0	0	0	0	0	0	0	0	0	.000	.000	.000	0
**Austin Hedges**	120	387	36	83	17	0	18	55	4	23	122	.214	.262	.398	154
**Travis Jankowski**	27	75	10	14	2	0	0	1	4	9	28	.187	.282	.213	16
**Dinelson Lamet**	21	35	0	3	0	0	0	0	0	0	22	.086	.086	.086	3
Zach Lee	3	3	0	0	0	0	0	0	0	0	0	.000	.000	.000	0
Kyle Lloyd	1	1	0	0	0	0	0	0	0	0	0	.000	.000	.000	0
**Jordan Lyles**	5	8	1	2	0	0	0	3	0	1	3	.250	.333	.250	2
**Manuel Margot**	126	487	53	128	18	7	13	39	17	35	106	.263	.313	.409	199
**Wil Myers**	155	567	80	138	29	3	30	74	20	70	180	.243	.328	.464	263
Dillon Overton	1	1	0	0	0	0	0	0	0	0	1	.000	.000	.000	0
**Luis Perdomo**	29	46	3	5	1	4	0	3	0	1	20	.109	.128	.304	14
Kevin Quackenbush	18	1	0	0	0	0	0	0	0	0	1	.000	.000	.000	0
José Pirela	83	312	43	90	25	4	10	40	4	27	71	.288	.347	.490	153
**Hunter Renfroe**	122	445	51	103	25	1	26	58	3	27	140	.231	.284	.467	208
Clayton Richard	32	57	2	7	1	0	1	4	0	1	31	.123	.167	.193	11
Héctor Sánchez	75	137	14	30	4	0	8	25	0	5	41	.219	.245	.423	58
Luis Sardiñas	29	49	3	8	0	0	0	1	1	4	11	.163	.226	.163	8
Ryan Schimpf	53	165	24	26	2	0	14	25	0	27	70	.158	.284	.424	70
Yangervis Solarte	128	466	49	119	21	0	18	64	3	37	61	.255	.314	.416	194
Cory Spangenberg	129	444	57	117	18	2	13	46	11	34	128	.264	.322	.401	178
**Craig Stammen**	60	6	2	3	1	0	0	0	0	2	2	.500	.625	.667	4
Matt Szczur	104	176	26	40	11	2	3	15	0	32	40	.227	.358	.364	64
**Luis Torrens**	56	123	7	20	3	1	0	7	0	12	30	.163	.243	.203	25
José Torres	62	1	1	1	0	0	0	0	0	0	0	1.000	1.000	1.000	1
Christian Villanueva	12	32	5	11	1	0	4	7	0	0	10	.344	.344	.750	24
Jared Weaver	9	10	0	0	0	0	0	0	0	0	6	.000	.000	.000	0
Travis Wood	11	17	3	4	0	0	2	6	0	0	7	.235	.235	.588	10
**Team totals**	**162**	**5356**	**604**	**1251**	**227**	**31**	**189**	**576**	**89**	**460**	**1499**	**.234**	**.299**	**.393**	**2107**

=== Pitching ===
(Through October 1, 2017)
Players in bold are on the active MLB roster as of 2022.

Note: W = Wins; L = Losses; ERA = Earned run average; G = Games pitched; GS = Games started; SV = Saves; IP = Innings pitched; H = Hits allowed; R = Runs allowed; ER = Earned runs allowed; BB = Walks allowed; K = Strikeouts

Player	W	L	ERA	G	GS	SV	IP	H	R	ER	BB	K
Erick Aybar	0	0	0.00	2	0	0	1.1	0	0	0	1	0
Buddy Baumann	2	1	2.55	23	0	0	17.2	11	5	5	7	21
**Christian Bethancourt**	0	0	14.73	4	0	0	3.2	6	9	6	8	2
Ryan Buchter	3	3	3.05	42	0	1	38.1	28	15	13	18	47
Trevor Cahill	4	3	3.69	11	11	0	61.0	58	29	25	24	72
Carter Capps	0	0	6.57	11	0	0	12.1	12	9	9	2	7
**Jhoulys Chacín**	13	10	3.89	32	32	0	180.1	157	82	78	72	153
Jarred Cosart	0	2	4.88	7	6	0	24.0	26	15	13	19	15
Miguel Díaz	1	1	7.34	31	3	0	41.2	44	35	34	25	33
Jake Esch	0	0	—	1	0	0	0.0	0	0	0	2	0
**Brad Hand**	3	4	2.16	72	0	21	79.1	54	20	19	20	104
**Dinelson Lamet**	7	8	4.57	21	21	0	114.1	88	63	58	54	139
Zach Lee	1	0	5.63	3	1	0	8.0	8	5	5	8	6
Kyle Lloyd	0	0	9.00	1	1	0	4.0	6	4	4	2	2
**Jordan Lyles**	1	3	9.39	5	5	0	23.0	35	24	24	10	22
**Phil Maton**	3	2	4.19	46	0	1	43.0	43	23	20	14	46
Brandon Maurer	1	4	5.72	42	0	20	39.1	39	25	25	8	38
Cory Mazzoni	0	0	13.50	6	0	0	8.0	17	16	12	4	4
Kyle McGrath	0	0	2.84	17	0	0	19.0	14	6	6	6	16
Tim Melville	0	0	7.71	2	0	0	2.1	3	3	2	3	3
Dillon Overton	0	1	7.71	1	1	0	4.2	9	4	4	2	3
**Luis Perdomo**	8	11	4.67	29	29	0	163.2	182	97	85	65	118
Kevin Quackenbush	0	2	7.86	20	0	0	26.1	32	23	23	16	23
Clayton Richard	8	15	4.79	32	32	0	197.1	240	114	105	59	151
**José Ruiz**	0	0	0.00	1	0	0	1.0	0	0	0	1	1
Luis Sardiñas	0	0	0.00	1	0	0	1.0	1	0	0	0	0
**Craig Stammen**	2	3	3.14	60	0	0	80.1	68	29	28	28	74
José Torres	7	4	4.21	62	0	1	68.1	63	34	32	16	63
Jose Valdez	0	0	7.94	13	0	0	17.0	20	16	15	4	16
Jered Weaver	0	5	7.44	9	9	0	42.1	51	41	35	12	23
Travis Wood	3	4	6.71	11	11	0	52.1	62	44	39	25	36
**Kirby Yates**	4	5	3.72	61	0	1	55.2	42	26	23	19	87
**Team totals**	**71**	**91**	**4.67**	**162**	**162**	**45**	**1430.2**	**1417**	**816**	**742**	**554**	**1325**

== Farm system ==
Updated as of September 24, 2016

Level	Team	League	Manager	W	L	Position
AAA	El Paso Chihuahuas	Pacific Coast League	Rod Barajas	73	69	1st Place Pacific Southern PCL Runner Up
AA	San Antonio Missions	Texas League	Phillip Wellman	78	62	1st Place South Texas League Semifinalist
High A	Lake Elsinore Storm	California League	Edwin Rodríguez	64	76	4th Place South
A	Fort Wayne TinCaps	Midwest League	Anthony Contreras	68	72	6th Place East Midwest League Runner Up
A-Short Season	Tri-City Dust Devils	Northwest League	Ben Fritz	40	36	2nd Place North
Rookie	AZL Padres 1	Arizona League	Shaun Cole	25	31	5th Place West
Rookie	AZL Padres 2	Arizona League	Michael Collins	30	25	2nd Place West
Rookie	DSL Padres	Dominican Summer League	Aaron Levin	24	47	8th Place Baseball City
