= Allen Córdoba =

Panamanian baseball player (born 1995)

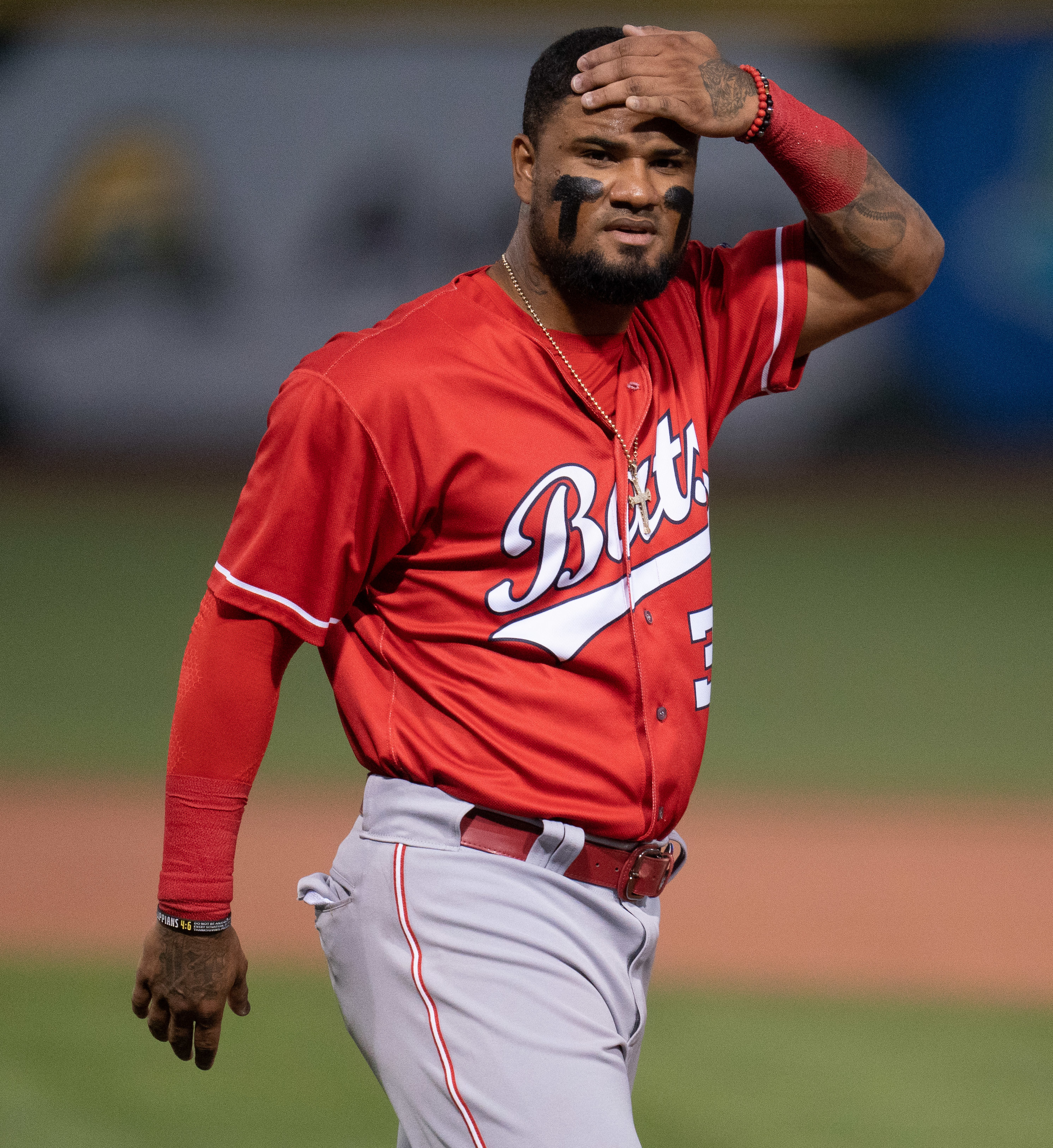
- Córdoba with the Louisville Bats in 2022

Charros de Jalisco – No. 13
- Infielder
- Born: December 6, 1995 (age 30); Changuinola, Bocas del Toro, Panama
- Bats: Right Throws: Right

MLB debut
- April 3, 2017, for the San Diego Padres

MLB statistics (through 2017 season)
- Batting average: .208
- Home runs: 4
- Runs batted in: 15
- Stats at Baseball Reference

Teams
- San Diego Padres (2017)

Allen Octavio Córdoba Pose (born December 6, 1995) is a Panamanian professional baseball infielder for the Charros de Jalisco of the Mexican League. He has previously played in Major League Baseball (MLB) for the San Diego Padres. He made his MLB debut in 2017. A right-handed batter and thrower, Córdoba stands 6 feet 1 inch (1.85 m) tall and weighs 175 pounds (79 kg).

== Career ==
=== St. Louis Cardinals ===
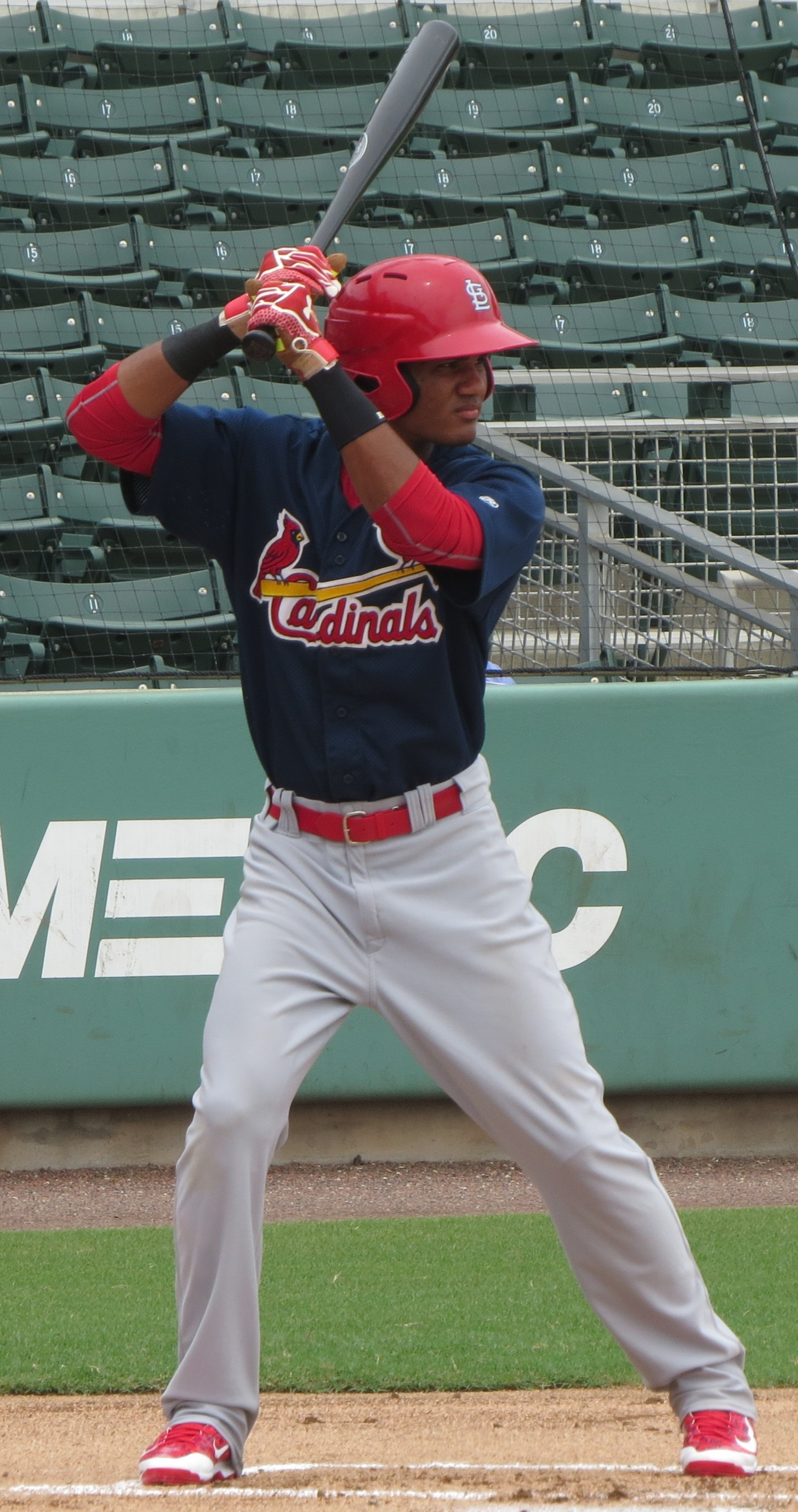
Córdoba batting for the GCL Cardinals in 2015

Córdoba signed with the St. Louis Cardinals as an international free agent on April 12, 2013. He made his professional debut with the DSL Cardinals in 2013, and also played for the club in 2014, hitting .272 and .258 respectively. He was the Gulf Coast League Most Valuable Player (MVP) in 2015 after hitting .342 in 53 games, and won the Appalachian League batting title while playing with a .362 batting average with the Johnson City Cardinals in 2016. With Johnson City, he made 220 plate appearances, batted .362, .427 on-base percentage, 16 doubles and five triples.

=== San Diego Padres ===
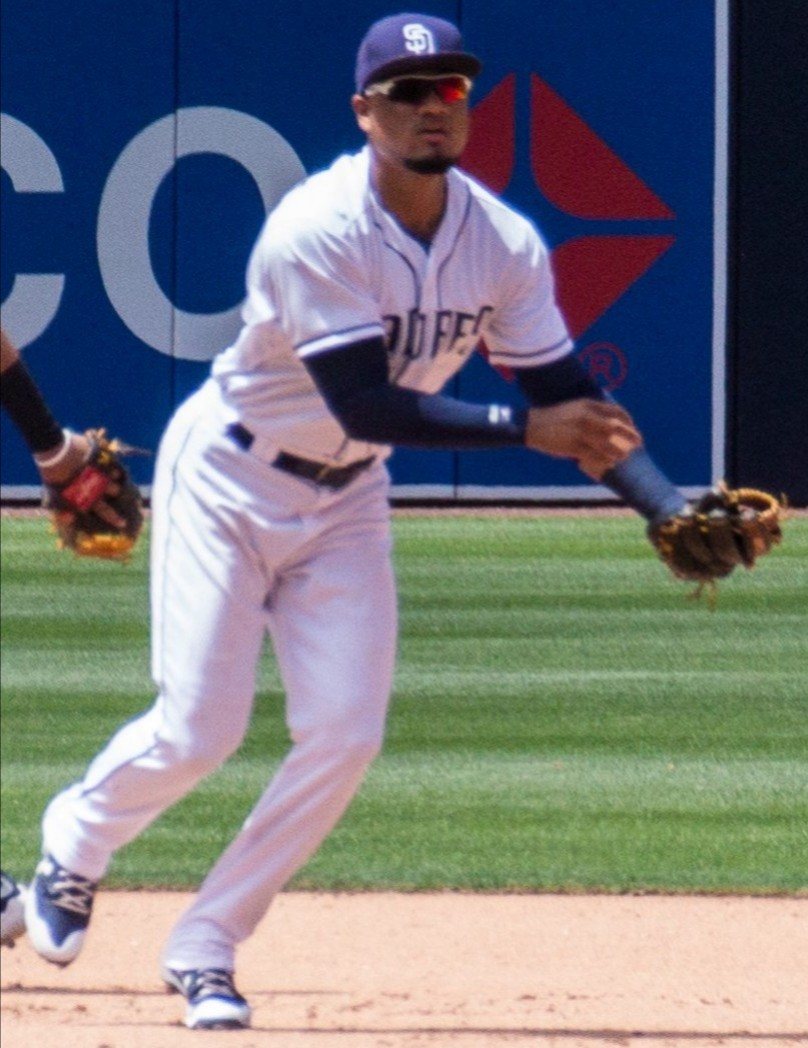
Cordoba with the San Diego Padres in 2017

Córdoba was selected by the San Diego Padres after the season in the 2016 Rule 5 draft.

Córdoba made the Padres' 2017 Opening Day roster. At 21 years old, he had never previously played above Rookie League ball. He hit his first major league home run on April 18, 2017, versus Jaime García in the seventh inning of 5−4 loss to the Atlanta Braves at SunTrust Park. Córdoba was batting as high as .310 as of June 2, but he slumped afterward, and lost playing time as a result. Cordoba made a total of 42 starts in 2017, 24 in left field, 15 at shortstop, 2 in center, and 1 in right, but only had 56 plate appearances after the All-Star break. Cordoba made 11 of his starts in left in May after Travis Jankowski went down with a foot injury, but he was displaced by José Pirela, who came up in early June. He saw more playing time at shortstop in June, but the Padres chose to stay with Erick Aybar, and then Dusty Coleman when Aybar was on the disabled list. Cordoba finished the season with a .208/.282/.297 batting line and 4 home runs in 202 at-bats.

Córdoba missed the beginning of the 2018 season with a concussion, and did not make an appearances in the majors after struggles in High-A with the Lake Elsinore Storm. On November 20, 2018, Córdoba was designated for assignment by the Padres. On November 26, Córdoba was outrighted to Triple-A El Paso. Córdoba spent the 2019 season in Lake Elsinore, batting .301/.367/.412 with career-highs in home runs (5) and RBI (43) in 105 games. Córdoba did not play in a game in 2020 due to the cancellation of the minor league season because of the COVID-19 pandemic. After the 2020 season, he played for Panama in the 2021 Caribbean Series.

=== Cincinnati Reds ===
On December 1, 2021, Cordoba signed a minor league contract with the Cincinnati Reds. In 34 games for the Triple-A Louisville Bats, he batted .162/.263/.273 with three home runs, 13 RBI, and nine stolen bases. Córdoba was released by the Reds organization on June 19, 2022.

=== Algodoneros de Unión Laguna ===
On July 1, 2022, Córdoba signed with the Algodoneros de Unión Laguna of the Mexican League. In 30 games, he slashed .431/.478/.647 with six home runs, 22 RBI, and 12 stolen bases.

Córdoba played in 85 games for Laguna in 2023, hitting .338/.421/.444 with four home runs, 42 RBI, and 18 stolen bases. In 2024, he made 84 appearances for the Algodoneros, batting .304/.412/.421 with four home runs, 29 RBI, and 10 stolen bases.

=== Charros de Jalisco ===
On January 27, 2025, Córdoba, Jake Jewell, and Alberto Leyva were traded to the Charros de Jalisco in exchange for Nestor Anguamea. In 60 appearances for Jalisco, Córdoba batted .395/.484/.488 with two home runs, 26 RBI, and 41 stolen bases.

=== Diablos Rojos del México ===
On July 1, 2025, Córdoba was traded to the Diablos Rojos del México of the Mexican League. In 60 appearances for the Diablos, he hit .395/.484/.488 with two home runs, 26 RBI, and 41 stolen bases. With the team, Córdoba won the Serie del Rey.

=== Charros de Jalisco (second stint) ===
On March 9, 2026, Córdoba was returned to the Charros de Jalisco of the Mexican League.

== International career ==
Córdoba was selected to represent Panama at the 2023 World Baseball Classic qualification.

== See also ==
- List of Major League Baseball players from Panama
