= Luis Perdomo (baseball, born 1993) =

Dominican baseball player (born 1993)

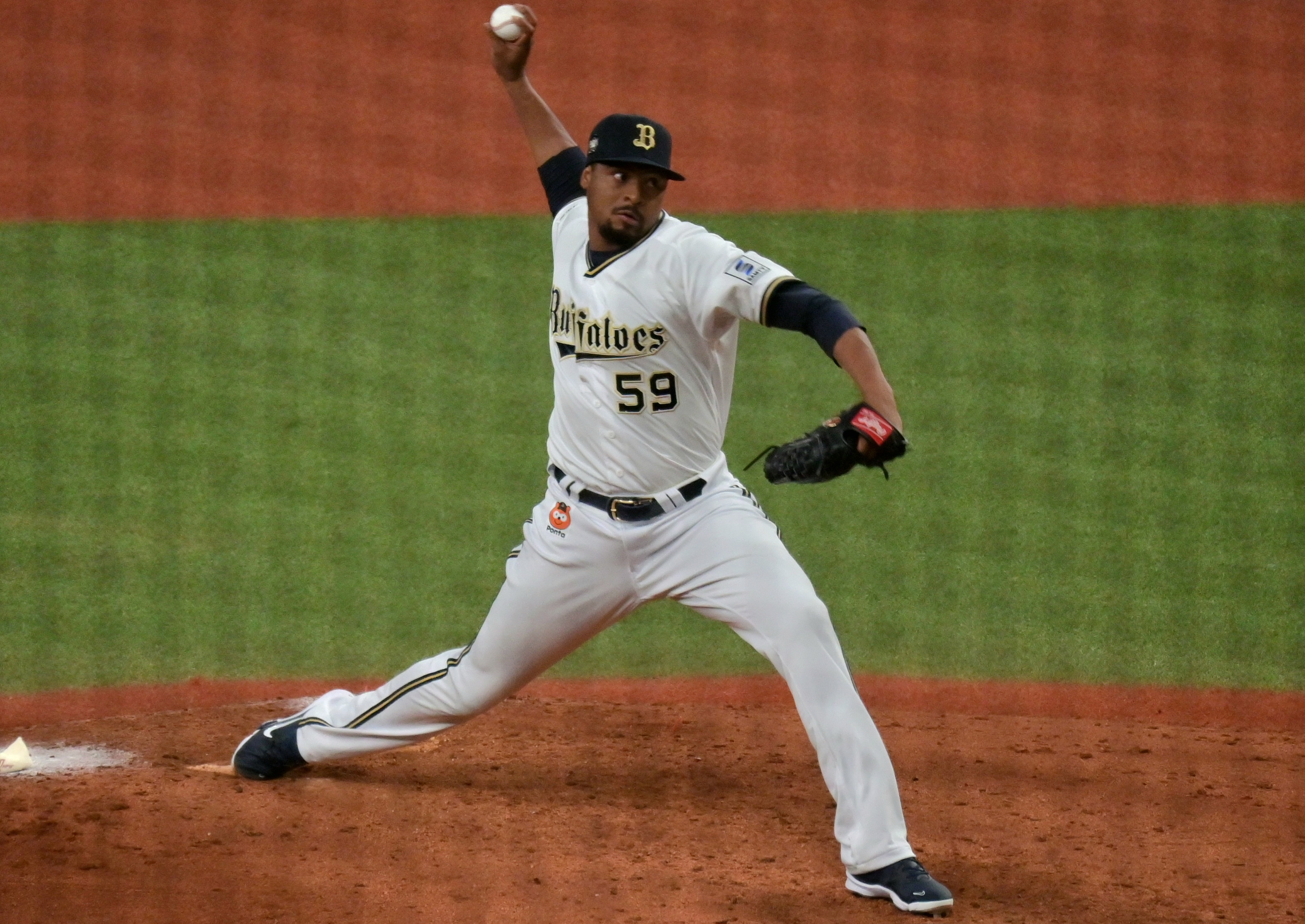
- Perdomo with the Orix Buffaloes in 2024

Free agent
- Pitcher
- Born: May 9, 1993 (age 33); Santo Domingo, Dominican Republic
- Bats: Right Throws: Right

Professional debut
- MLB: April 4, 2016, for the San Diego Padres
- NPB: April 1, 2023, for the Chiba Lotte Marines

MLB statistics (through 2022 season)
- Win–loss record: 23–31
- Earned run average: 5.12
- Strikeouts: 345

NPB statistics (through 2026 season)
- Win–loss record: 5-10
- Earned run average: 2.92
- Strikeouts: 98
- Saves: 5
- Stats at Baseball Reference

Teams
- San Diego Padres (2016–2020); Milwaukee Brewers (2022); Chiba Lotte Marines (2023); Orix Buffaloes (2024–2026)

Career highlights and awards
- NPB All-Star (2023)

Luis David Perdomo (born May 9, 1993) is a Dominican professional baseball pitcher who is a free agent. He has previously played in Major League Baseball (MLB) for the San Diego Padres and Milwaukee Brewers, and in Nippon Professional Baseball (NPB) for the Chiba Lotte Marines and Orix Buffaloes.

== Professional career ==
=== St. Louis Cardinals ===
Perdomo signed with the St. Louis Cardinals as an international free agent in November 2010. He made his professional debut in 2011 with the Dominican Summer League Cardinals. After spending 2012 and 2013 with Rookie League clubs, in 2014 Perdomo made 2 starts with the Low–A New York–Penn League State College Spikes and 11 starts with the Single–A Midwest League Peoria Chiefs, putting up a 4.43 ERA between the two levels. In 2015, Perdomo started the year with the Chiefs. He was named the Cardinals Minor League Baseball Pitcher of the Month for May, posting a 1.42 ERA and striking out 33 in 31 2/3 innings. In July, he was the Cardinals representative at the All-Star Futures Game, taking the place of the injured Alex Reyes. After posting a 3.68 ERA in 17 starts with the Chiefs, Perdomo was promoted to the High–A Palm Beach Cardinals in August, where he made 5 starts and had a 5.13 ERA.

=== San Diego Padres ===
On December 10, 2015, Perdomo was selected by the Colorado Rockies in the Rule 5 draft, and subsequently traded to the San Diego Padres in exchange for a player to be named later or cash considerations.

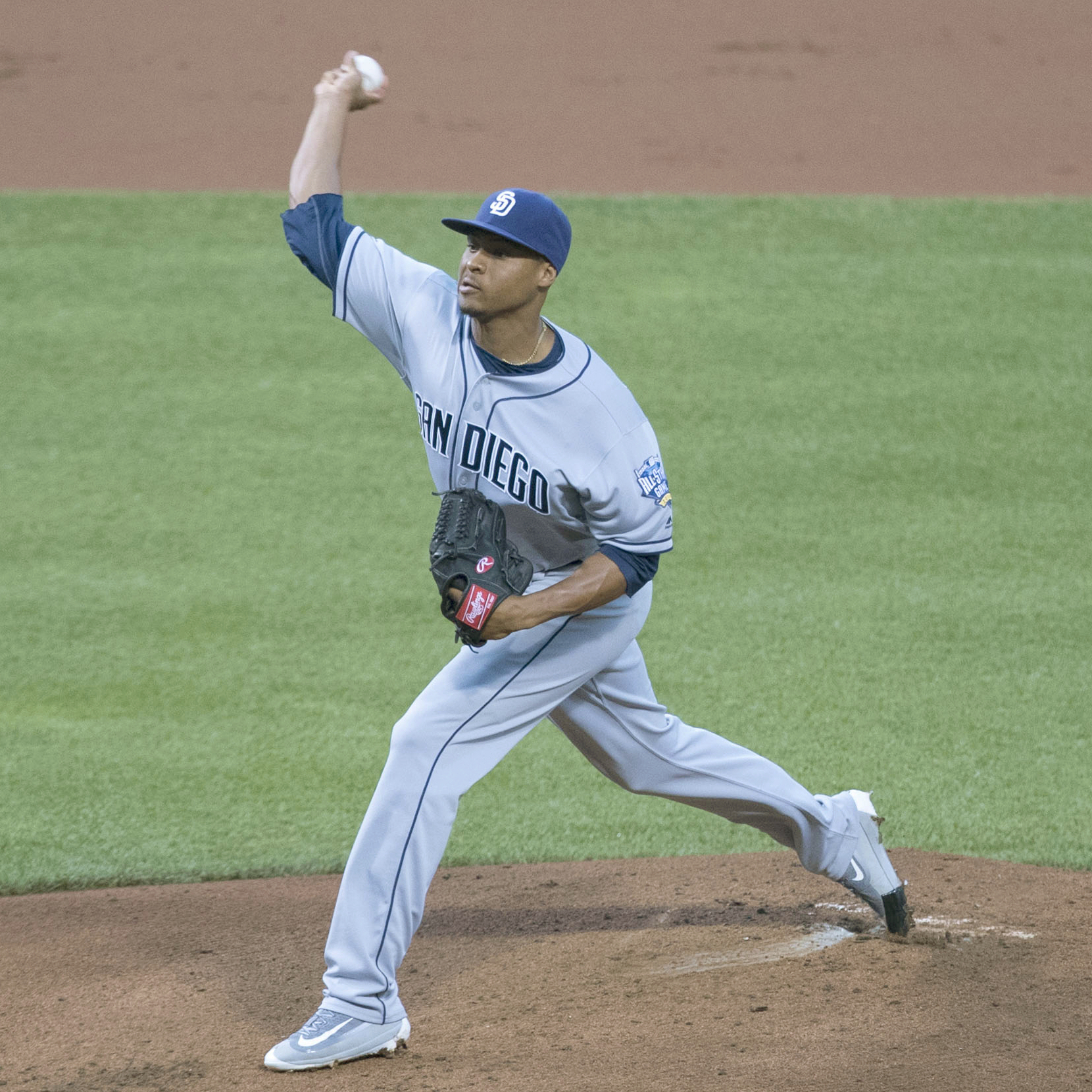
Perdomo with the San Diego Padres in 2016

As a Rule 5 selection, Perdomo was added to the Padres bullpen for 2016 despite being hit hard in Spring Training and never having pitched above the High–A level. He was moved into the rotation in June as the Padres lost other starting pitchers to trades or injuries. On August 28, he threw his first complete game, earning a 3–1 victory over the Miami Marlins. Perdomo finished the season with a 9–10 record and a 5.71 ERA, although he improved over the season and had a better ERA as a starter (4.85) than as a reliever (9.10).

Perdomo was named the Padres fifth starter coming out of Spring Training in 2017. After missing some time with a sore shoulder in April, Perdomo remained in the starting rotation for the remainder of the year. He posted an 8–11 record and a 4.67 ERA in 29 starts, with 118 strike-outs in 163 2/3 innings pitched. He was 3rd on the club in innings pitched, behind Clayton Richard and Jhoulys Chacín, and led the National League in ground ball rate.

Perdomo won a spot in the Padres' 2018 starting rotation. On April 11 of that year, in a game against the Colorado Rockies, Perdomo threw a pitch behind Nolan Arenado, causing Arenado to charge the mound. Perdomo flung his glove at Arenado and dodged in a split second to avoid the tackle, leading to a bench-clearing brawl. On April 13, Perdomo was suspended for five games. He was placed on the disabled list on July 28 with a right shoulder strain. He ended the season 1–6 in 12 appearances (10 starts). He had an ERA of 7.05 in 44 2/3 innings. In 2019, Perdomo pitched exclusively out of the bullpen, totaling 47 appearances while making just 1 start. He was 2–4 with an even 4.00 ERA.

In mid-October 2020, Perdomo underwent Tommy John surgery. On November 20, 2020, Perdomo was designated for assignment by the Padres.

=== Milwaukee Brewers ===
On December 16, 2020, Perdomo signed a minor league contract with the Milwaukee Brewers organization. He did not play in a game in 2021 as he recovered from injury. He was assigned to the Triple-A Nashville Sounds to begin the 2022 season.

On May 6, 2022, Perdomo was selected to the 40–man and active rosters. In 14 appearances for Milwaukee, he posted a 3.80 ERA with 12 strikeouts in 23 2/3 innings pitched. On November 18, Perdomo was non-tendered and became a free agent.

=== Chiba Lotte Marines ===
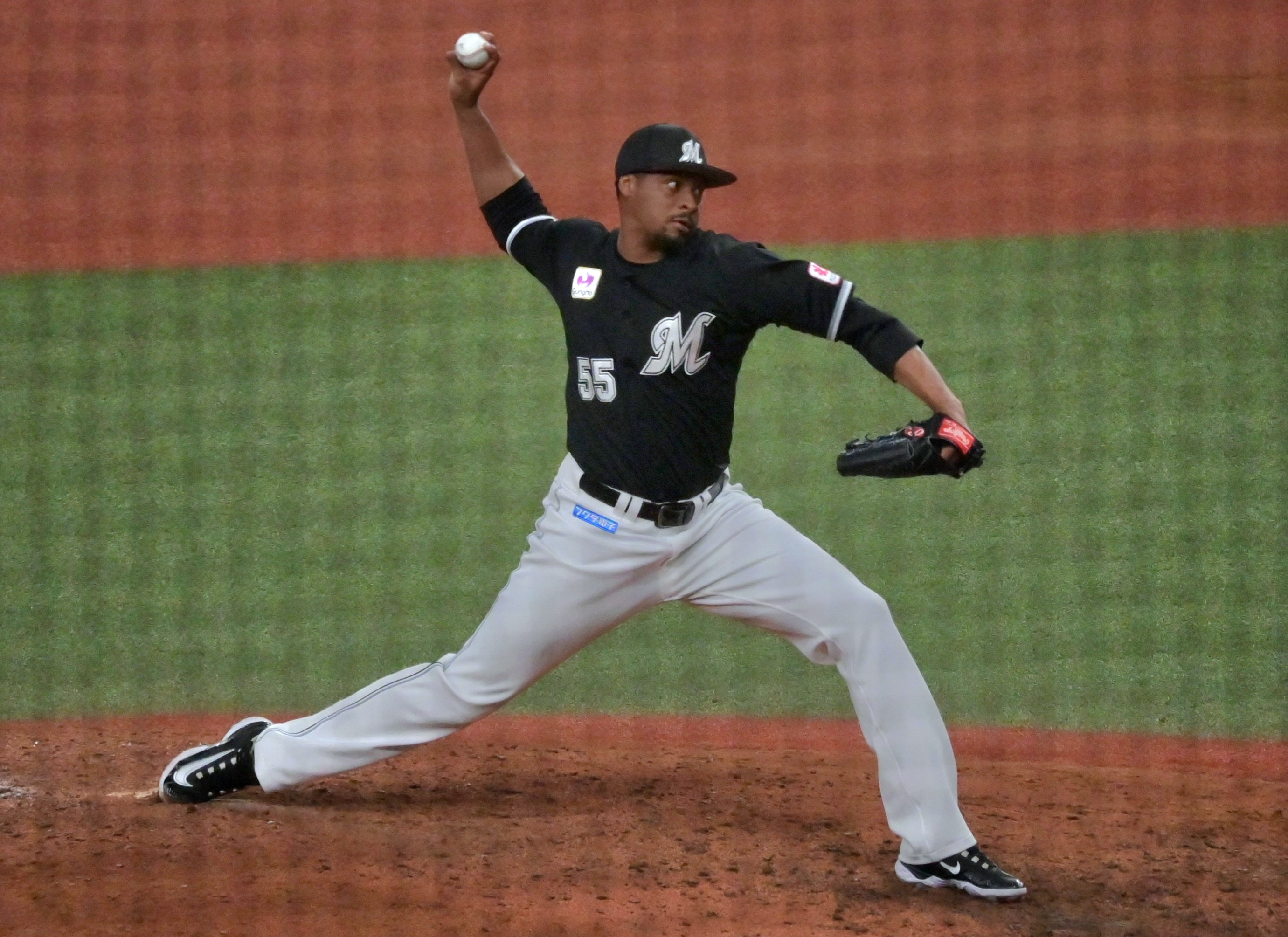
Perdomo with the Chiba Lotte Marines in 2023

On January 13, 2023, Perdomo signed with the Chiba Lotte Marines of Nippon Professional Baseball (NPB). The contract came with a $1.3 million guarantee and incentives that can boost the total to $1.8 million. In 53 appearances for the Lotte, he registered a 2.13 ERA with 41 strikeouts across 50 2/3 innings of work. Perdomo became a free agent following the season.

=== Toros de Tijuana ===
On February 8, 2024, Perdomo signed a minor league contract with the Washington Nationals. He was released by Washington on March 21.

On April 24, 2024, Perdomo signed with the Toros de Tijuana of the Mexican League. In 10 games for Tijuana, he recorded an 0.96 ERA with 7 strikeouts across 9 1/3 innings pitched.

=== Orix Buffaloes ===
On May 28, 2024, Perdomo signed with the Orix Buffaloes of Nippon Professional Baseball.

On October 17, 2024, Perdomo re-signed with the Buffaloes for the 2025 season. On October 11, 2026, the Buffaloes announced Perdomo would not be re-signed for the 2027 season.

== See also ==
- Rule 5 draft results
