= Jake Jewell =

American baseball player (born 1993)

- Pitcher
- Born: May 16, 1993 (age 33); Norman, Oklahoma, U.S.
- Batted: Right Threw: Right

MLB debut
- June 16, 2018, for the Los Angeles Angels

Last MLB appearance
- August 25, 2021, for the Chicago Cubs

MLB statistics
- Win–loss record: 0–3
- Earned run average: 7.75
- Strikeouts: 34
- Stats at Baseball Reference

Teams
- Los Angeles Angels (2018–2019); Chicago Cubs (2021)

Jake Robert Jewell (born May 16, 1993) is an American former professional baseball pitcher. He played in Major League Baseball (MLB) for the Los Angeles Angels from 2018 to 2019 and the Chicago Cubs in 2021. He throws and bats right-handed, and is listed at 6 feet 3 inches (1.91 m) and 200 pounds (91 kg). The Angels selected Jewell in the fifth round of the 2014 MLB draft.

== Early life ==
Jewell was born in Norman, Oklahoma. He attended Norman High School and Northeastern Oklahoma A&M College.

== Career ==
=== Los Angeles Angels ===
The Angels selected Jewell in the fifth round of the 2014 MLB draft. He signed and spent 2015 with both the rookie-level Arizona League Angels and the Orem Owlz, posting a 1–2 win–loss record and 3.59 earned run average (ERA) in 12 games (nine starts) over 42 2/3 innings between the two teams.

In 2015, he played for the Burlington Bees in the Single–A Midwest League where he compiled a 6–8 record and 4.77 ERA in 111 1/3 innings pitched. Baseball America named him the Angels No. 5 prospect entering 2016 season. In 2016, he played for the Inland Empire 66ers of the High-A California League, pitching to a 2–15 record, 6.31 ERA, and 1.87 walks plus hits per inning pitched (WHIP) ratio in 28 games (27 starts) over 137 innings.

Jewell began 2017 back with the 66ers, and after posting a 2.25 ERA in his first three starts, was promoted to the Mobile BayBears of the Double–A Southern League, where he finished the season, going 7–8 with a 4.84 ERA in 24 games (23 starts). After the 2017 season, the Angels added Jewell to their 40-man roster. He began the 2018 season with the BayBears, and after seven games, was promoted to the Salt Lake Bees of the Triple–A Pacific Coast League, with whom he was 2–4 with a 3.60 ERA in 25 innings.

The Angels promoted Jewell to the major leagues on June 15. He made his major league debut the next day against the Oakland Athletics at Oakland Coliseum, pitching a scoreless eighth inning in which he earned his first major league strikeout against Franklin Barreto. During Jewell's third MLB game, on June 27 against the Boston Red Sox, he left the game after an apparent ankle injury suffered while trying to make a play at the plate. The following day, the Angels placed Jewell on the disabled list due to a right fibula fracture, requiring season-ending surgery. For the season with the Angels, he pitched 2 innings and was 0–1.

In 2019 with Salt Lake, Jewell was 4–4 with eight saves and a 5.26 ERA in 37 2/3 innings, and with the Angels he was 0–0 with a 6.84 ERA in 26 1/3 innings. Jewell was designated for assignment on January 6, 2020, following the acquisition of Kyle Keller.

=== San Francisco Giants ===
On January 13, 2020, Jewell was claimed off waivers by the San Francisco Giants. Jewell was designated for assignment by the Giants on January 21. He cleared waivers and sent outright to the Triple–A Sacramento River Cats on January 24. Jewell did not play in a game in 2020 due to the cancellation of the minor league season because of the COVID-19 pandemic. He became a free agent on November 2.

=== Chicago Cubs ===
On November 16, 2020, Jewell signed a minor league contract with the Chicago Cubs organization. He had his contract selected to the major league roster on July 29, 2021. Jewell made 10 appearances for the Cubs, struggling to a 9.90 ERA with 10 strikeouts. On August 28, Jewell was designated for assignment by the Cubs.

=== Los Angeles Dodgers ===
On August 31, 2021, Jewell was claimed off waivers by the Los Angeles Dodgers. Jewell did not appear in a game for the Dodgers and made 2 appearances for the Triple-A Oklahoma City Dodgers, tossing 2 1/3 scoreless innings.

=== San Francisco Giants (second stint) ===
On September 7, 2021, Jewell was claimed off waivers by the San Francisco Giants. On September 11, the Giants outrighted Jewell off the 40-man roster and assigned him to the Triple-A Sacramento River Cats. On October 20, Jewell elected free agency.

=== Cleveland Guardians ===
On March 17, 2022, Jewell signed a minor league contract with the Cleveland Guardians. The deal included an invitation to the Guardians' 2022 major league spring training camp. Jewell began the 2022 season with the Columbus Clippers, the Guardians' Triple-A affiliate. The Guardians selected Jewell's contract on August 6. He was designated for assignment on August 15, without having made an appearance for the Guardians.

=== Minnesota Twins ===
On August 17, 2022, Jewell was claimed off waivers by the Minnesota Twins. On September 6, Jewell was designated for assignment following the promotion of Louie Varland. He cleared waivers and was sent outright to the Triple–A St. Paul Saints on September 9. On October 13, Jewell elected free agency.

=== Philadelphia Phillies ===
On December 24, 2022, Jewell signed a minor league deal with the Philadelphia Phillies. In 22 appearances (6 starts) for the Triple–A Lehigh Valley IronPigs, Jewell struggled to a 7.66 ERA with 26 strikeouts in 24 2/3 innings pitched. He was released by the Phillies organization on June 13.

=== Algodoneros de Unión Laguna ===
On June 26, 2023, Jewell signed with the Algodoneros de Unión Laguna of the Mexican League. In 17 games down the stretch, he posted a 1–2 record and 4.95 ERA with 17 strikeouts across 20 innings pitched.

Jewell made 46 appearances for the Algodoneros in 2024, registering a 7–2 record and 3.95 ERA with 33 strikeouts across 41 innings of relief. In the 2024 season he was selected for the Mexican Baseball League All-Star Game for the Zona Norte team.

=== Charros de Jalisco ===
On January 27, 2025, Jewell, Allen Córdoba, and Alberto Leyva were traded to the Charros de Jalisco in exchange for Nestor Anguamea. In 35 games he threw 32.2 innings of relief going 0-3 with a 6.34 ERA and 35 strikeouts.
