= Carlos Asuaje =

Venezuelan-American baseball player (born 1991)

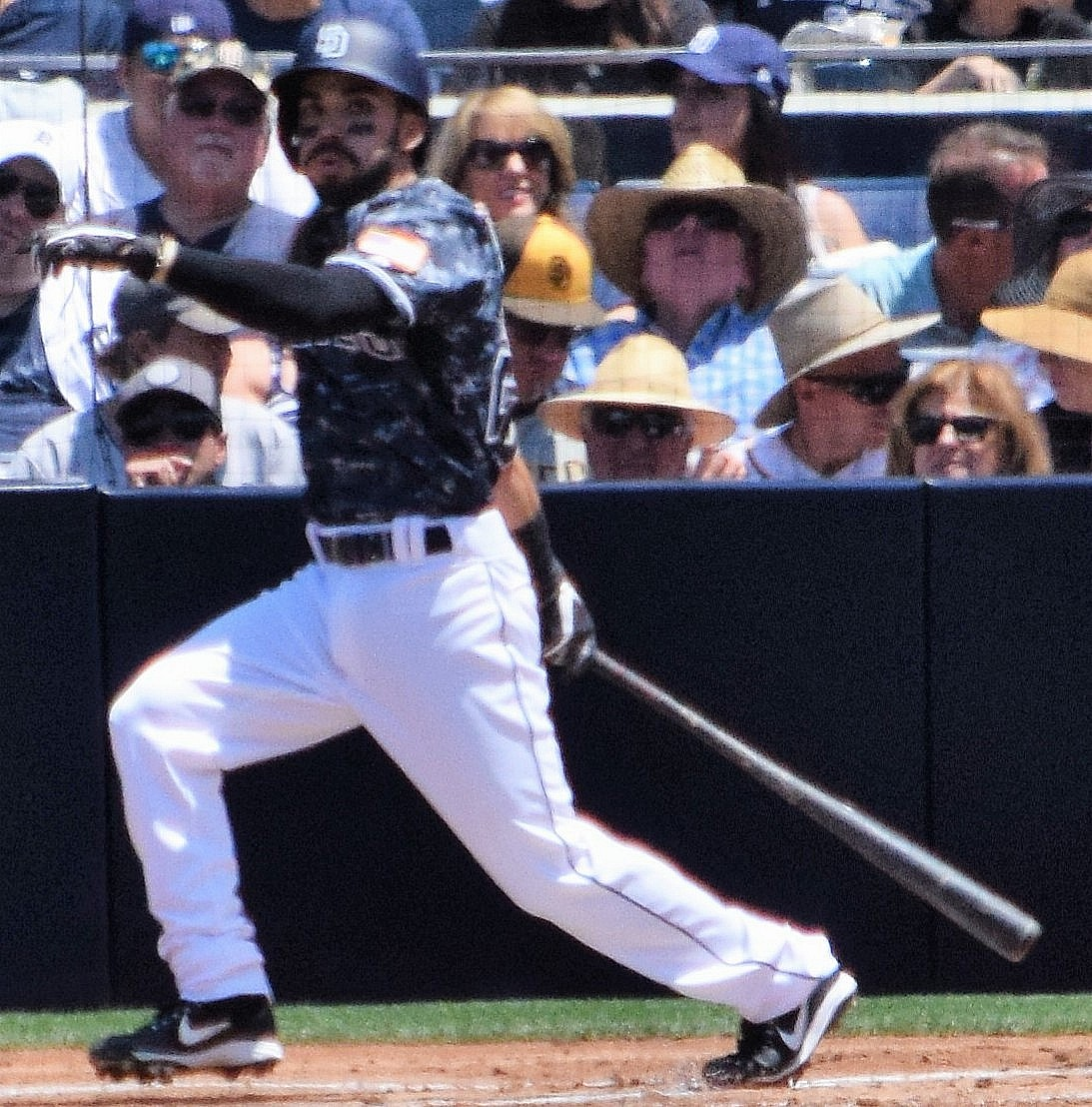
- Asuaje with the San Diego Padres in 2017
- Second baseman
- Born: November 2, 1991 (age 34); Barquisimeto, Lara, Venezuela
- Batted: Left Threw: Right

Professional debut
- MLB: September 21, 2016, for the San Diego Padres
- KBO: March 23, 2019, for the Lotte Giants

Last appearance
- MLB: August 26, 2018, for the San Diego Padres
- KBO: June 5, 2019, for the Lotte Giants

MLB statistics
- Batting average: .240
- Home runs: 6
- Runs batted in: 42

KBO statistics
- Batting average: .252
- Home runs: 2
- Runs batted in: 21
- Stats at Baseball Reference

Teams
- San Diego Padres (2016–2018); Lotte Giants (2019)

Carlos Alberto Asuaje Ciafre (ah-soo-ah-hay; born November 2, 1991) is a Venezuelan-American former professional baseball infielder. He played in Major League Baseball (MLB) for the San Diego Padres and in the KBO League for the Lotte Giants.

== Amateur career ==
A native of both Barquisimeto, Venezuela and Weston, Florida, Asuaje attended St. Thomas Aquinas High School and played college baseball at Nova Southeastern University in Broward County, Florida. Asuaje posted a .356/.451/.519 slash line in three seasons at Nova, being named Sunshine State Conference Freshman of the Year in 2011 and Sunshine State Conference Co-Player of the Year in 2012. After his freshman season in 2012, he played collegiate summer baseball for the Yarmouth–Dennis Red Sox of the Cape Cod Baseball League, where he batted .298 in 52 games, and was named to the East Division All-Star team. Asuaje was selected by the Boston Red Sox in the 11th round of the 2013 MLB draft, and came to terms on a contract calling for a reported bonus of $100,000.

== Professional career ==
=== Boston Red Sox ===
Asuaje debuted professionally with the Low–A Lowell Spinners in their 2013 season, starting his career as a shortstop, but eventually moved full-time to third base where his skills profiled best. He also showed the ability to play second base or left field and spent some time at designated hitter. In just 52 games for Lowell, he hit .269/.366/.368 with 19 runs scored and 20 RBI.

In 2014, Asuaje hit for a .305 average in 90 games for the Low–A Greenville Drive, driving in 73 runs and scoring 69 times, while boasting a .391 OBP and collecting 45 extra-base hits. With 11 home runs, 10 triples and 24 doubles, he topped the South Atlantic League with a .542 slugging percentage and made the All-Star team before joining the High–A Salem Red Sox on July 14.

At Salem, Asuaje reached base safely in 35 of his 39 games against the more advanced High–A Carolina League pitching. He showed a progressive approach with an 11-game hitting streak from August 14–25, 2014, to finish the year with a .323/.398/.516 line, four home runs and 28 RBI. Overall, Asuaje hit .310 and slugged .533 in 129 games in his two stints. Additionally, he was the only player in the Sox minors system to collect 100-or-more RBI (101) and went on to post the best slugging percentage (.533). He also ended fourth in homers (15) and OBP (.393) and 10th in batting average (.310), while his on-base plus slugging (.927) was surpassed only by Mookie Betts (.960). Asuaje was named Greenville Drive Player of the Year and added another All-Star selection to his list of accomplishments, as he was chosen to the 2014 South Atlantic League Annual All-Star team.

Asuaje was promoted to the Double A Portland Sea Dogs in 2015, where was one of five Sea Dogs selected for the Eastern League All-Star team. Asuaje ended 2015 with eight homers, seven triples, 23 doubles, 61 RBI, 60 runs scored and nine steals, as he hit .251/.334/.374 over 131 games. He also gained a spot in the Arizona Fall League as a member of the Scottsdale Scorpions during offseason.

=== San Diego Padres ===
The Padres acquired Asuaje along with Javier Guerra, Manuel Margot and Logan Allen in November 2015, in the same transaction that sent Craig Kimbrel to the Boston Red Sox.

Asuaje opened 2016 with the Triple-A El Paso Chihuahuas of the Pacific Coast League as the regular second-baseman. He played in the 2016 All-Star Futures Game in his future home stadium, Petco Park, on July 10, then the Triple-A All-Star Game three days later and 2,079 miles away at BB&T Ballpark in Charlotte, North Carolina. He won the 2016 PCL Rookie of the Year Award, leading the league in hits (172) and runs (98), along with top-10 totals in doubles (32), triples (11), total bases (253), batting average (.321) and on-base percentage (.378).

The Padres promoted Asuaje to the major leagues on September 21, 2016, once the Triple-A team ended their playoff run. He was the first of the four prospects acquired in the Kimbrel trade to appear in an MLB game. In his first major league at-bat against Randall Delgado of the Diamondbacks he was called out looking on what should have been ball four and his first career walk. He made six starts at second base for the Padres as they finished out the season, hitting .208, with 5 hits, and 2 RBIs.

Asuaje opened the 2017 season in Triple-A, where he batted .250 in 62 games. After a brief call-up in May, he joined the Padres again on June 23 to become the primary second-baseman after Yangervis Solarte went to the disabled list with an oblique strain. Asuaje continued to man the second-base position even after Solarte's return, as manager Andy Green said Asuaje had "played beyond my expectations". Asuaje finished the season with a .270/.334/.362 batting line in 307 at-bats with 78 starts at second base.

The following season, Asuaje struggled offensively, hitting .196 in 79 games. He had the lowest batting average against left-handers among all MLB hitters (60 or more plate appearances), at .111. On December 7. 2018, the Padres designated Asuaje for assignment.

=== Lotte Giants ===
On December 10, 2018, Asuaje was claimed off waivers by the Texas Rangers.

On December 19, 2018, Asuaje was sold by the Rangers to the Lotte Giants of the KBO League. In 49 games for Lotte in 2019, he slashed .252/.356/.368 with two home runs, 21 RBI, and four stolen bases. Asuaje was released by the Giants on June 9.

=== Arizona Diamondbacks ===
On June 19, 2019, Asuaje signed a minor league contract with the Arizona Diamondbacks organization. In 59 games for the Triple–A Reno Aces, he batted .239/.339/.403 with five home runs and 29 RBI. Asuaje elected free agency following the season on November 4.

=== Chicago Cubs ===
On January 6, 2020, Asuaje signed a minor league deal with the Chicago Cubs. He did not play in a game in 2020 due to the cancellation of the minor league season because of the COVID-19 pandemic. Asuaje was released by the Cubs organization on May 28.

=== Los Angeles Dodgers ===
On December 10, 2020, Asuaje signed a minor league contract with the Los Angeles Dodgers organization. In 83 games for the Triple-A Oklahoma City Dodgers, he batted .249 with two home runs, 26 RBI, and seven stolen bases. Asuaje elected free agency following the season on November 7, 2021.

== See also ==
- List of Major League Baseball players from Venezuela
