= Kyle Lloyd =

American baseball player (born 1990)

- Pitcher
- Born: October 16, 1990 (age 35); Sacramento, California, U.S.
- Batted: Right Threw: Right

MLB debut
- July 25, 2017, for the San Diego Padres

Last MLB appearance
- July 25, 2017, for the San Diego Padres

MLB statistics
- Win–loss record: 0–0
- Earned run average: 9.00
- Strikeouts: 2
- Stats at Baseball Reference

Teams
- San Diego Padres (2017)

Kyle Christopher Lloyd (born October 16, 1990) is an American former professional baseball pitcher. He played in Major League Baseball (MLB) for the San Diego Padres.

== Amateur career ==
Lloyd attended Carmel High School in Carmel, Indiana, from 2005 to 2009. Lloyd earned Honorable Mention accolades from Hoosier Diamond Magazine following his senior season, when he had a 1–1 win-loss record with a 3.05 earned run average (ERA), one save, and 21 strikeouts in 20 2/3 innings pitched. As a junior, Lloyd worked 15 innings with four saves and 22 strikeouts.

After high school, Lloyd attended University of Evansville where he was a four-year letter winner for the Evansville Purple Aces. As a sophomore in 2011, he became the school's Friday night starter and pitched a team-high 84 innings. In 2012, as a junior, he received All-Missouri Valley Conference Honorable Mention accolades. He pitched a team-high 86 2/3 innings with 58 strikeouts, while holding opponents to a .241 batting average. As a senior in 2013, he led Evansville with 99 strikeouts and 94 innings pitched, while posting a 2.59 ERA. He also held opposing batters to a .218 average. He finished his college career ranked 10th on Evansville's all-time list with 301 innings, 8th with 46 starts and a 4.01 ERA, and 12th with 225 strikeouts.

== Professional career ==
The San Diego Padres selected Lloyd in the 29th round, with the 868th overall selection, in the 2013 Major League Baseball draft. He spent the majority of the 2013 season with the Eugene Emeralds of the Low–A Northwest League. He then pitched for the Fort Wayne TinCaps in the Single–A Midwest League in 2014 and for the Lake Elsinore Storm of the High–A California League in 2015. He pitched for the San Antonio Missions of the Double–A Texas League in 2016, when he went 7–7 with a 3.31 ERA, which ranked fifth in the Texas League. He also ranked 11th in the circuit with 99 strikeouts and 7th with 130 1/3 innings pitched.

Lloyd returned to San Antonio to start the 2017 season and was promoted to El Paso Chihuahuas of the Triple–A Pacific Coast League on May 29. On May 13, 2017, Lloyd threw a no-hitter against the Frisco RoughRiders at Nelson W. Wolff Municipal Stadium. He faced one batter over the minimum 27 and recorded 3 strikeouts.

Lloyd made his MLB debut against the New York Mets on July 25, 2017, at Petco Park in San Diego, California. Lloyd struck out two over four innings of work. Lloyd's first strike out was against Lucas Duda. He was designated for assignment on November 22.

Lloyd split the 2018 season between the rookie–level Arizona League Padres and El Paso, going a combined 3–2 with a 4.77 ERA in 54 2/3 innings. Lloyd split the 2019 campaign between El Paso and the Double–A Amarillo Sod Poodles, accumulating an 8–7 record and 4.20 ERA with 102 strikeouts and 3 saves over 113 2/3 innings. He elected free agency following the season on November 4, 2019.

== Personal life ==
Kyle and his fiancée Caitlin Wickes reside in Dallas, Texas. Lloyd proposed to Wickes on New Year's Eve 2016. Wickes graduated nursing school from Texas Women's University. The couple met at University of Evansville.

His father, Craig Lloyd, played in the Kansas City Royals Organization in 1974.
