= José Pirela =

Venezuelan baseball player (born 1989)

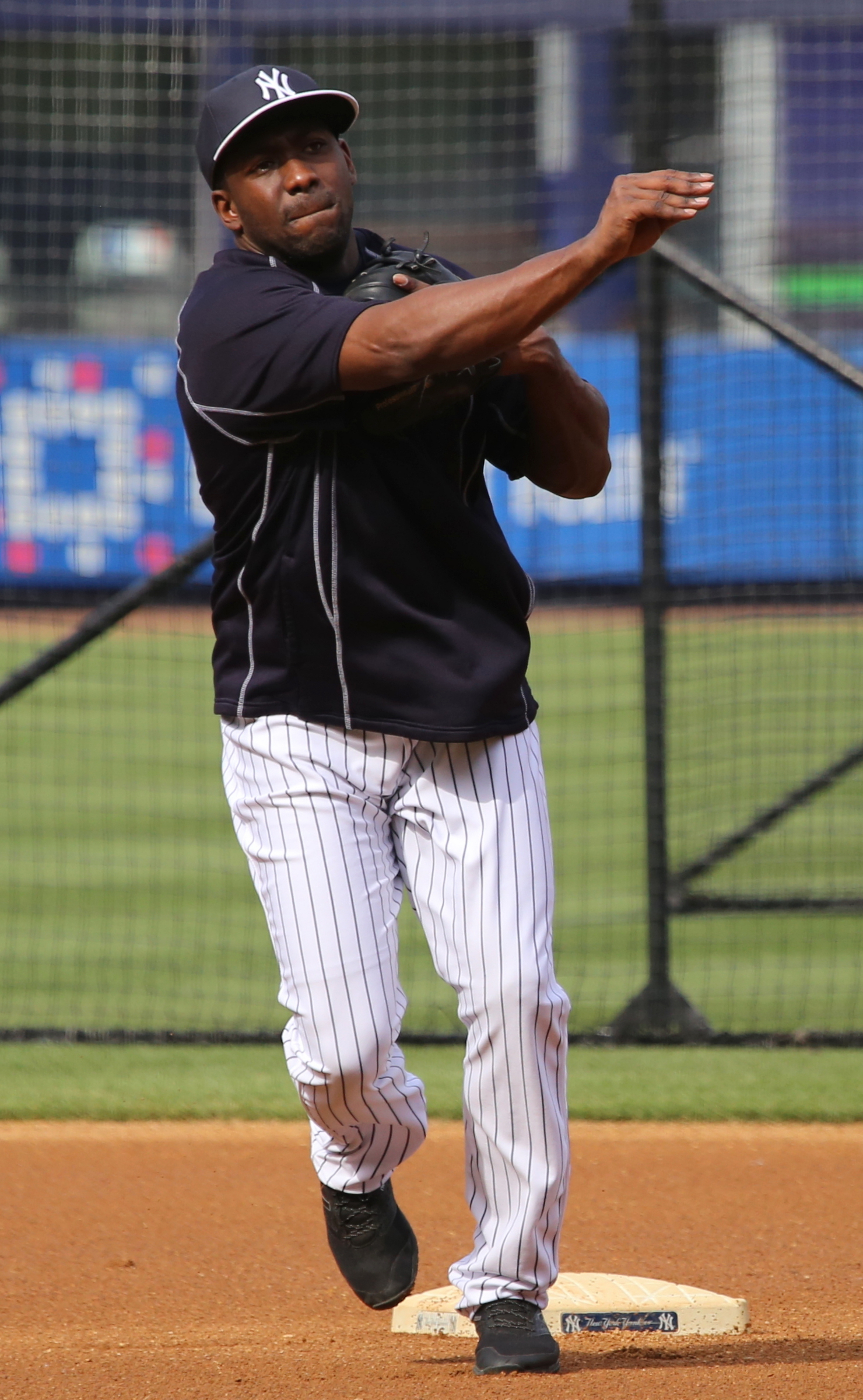
- Pirela with the New York Yankees in 2015

Diablos Rojos del México – No. 67
- Second baseman / Outfielder
- Born: November 21, 1989 (age 37); Valera, Trujillo, Venezuela
- Bats: Right Throws: Right

Professional debut
- MLB: September 22, 2014, for the New York Yankees
- NPB: June 19, 2020, for the Hiroshima Toyo Carp
- KBO: April 3, 2021, for the Samsung Lions

MLB statistics (through 2019 season)
- Batting average: .257
- Home runs: 17
- Runs batted in: 82

NPB statistics (through 2020 season)
- Batting average: .266
- Home runs: 11
- Runs batted in: 34

KBO statistics (through 2023 season)
- Batting average: .305
- Home runs: 73
- Runs batted in: 286
- Stats at Baseball Reference

Teams
- New York Yankees (2014–2015); San Diego Padres (2016–2019); Philadelphia Phillies (2019); Hiroshima Toyo Carp (2020); Samsung Lions (2021–2023)

Career highlights and awards
- KBO: 2× KBO All–Star (2022, 2023); KBO Golden Glove Award (2022)

José Manuel Pirela (born November 21, 1989) is a Venezuelan professional baseball second baseman and outfielder for the Diablos Rojos del México of the Mexican League. He has previously played in Major League Baseball (MLB) for the New York Yankees, San Diego Padres, and Philadelphia Phillies. He has also played in Nippon Professional Baseball (NPB) for the Hiroshima Toyo Carp and in the KBO League for the Samsung Lions.

== Early life ==
Pirela was born in Valera, Trujillo, Venezuela.

== Professional career ==
=== New York Yankees ===
==== Minor leagues ====
Pirela signed with the New York Yankees as an international free agent, receiving a $300,000 signing bonus. He made his professional debut with the Yankees in 2007 for the Dominican Summer League Yankees.

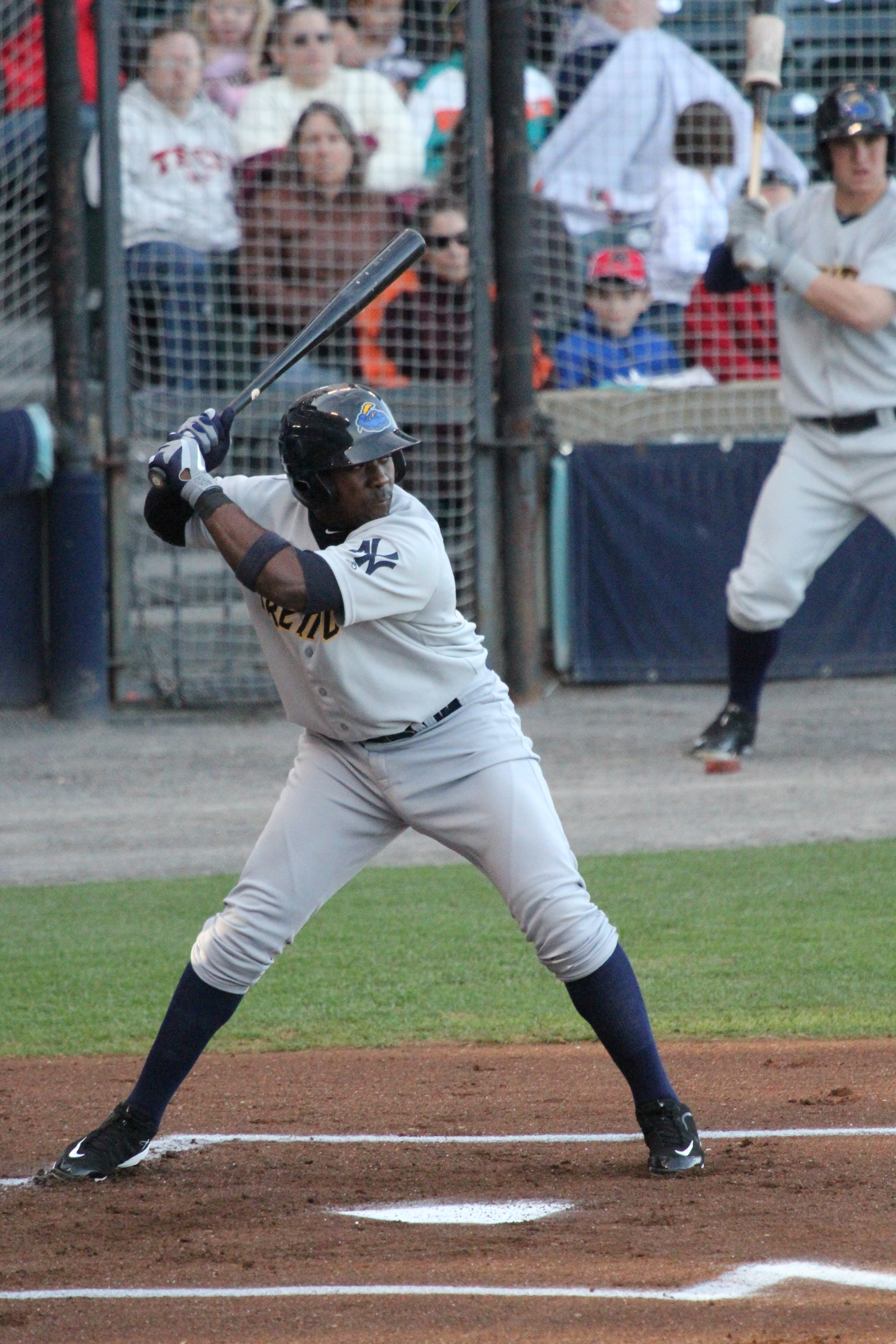
Pirela batting for the Trenton Thunder in 2013

He reached Triple-A for the first time in 2013 with the Scranton/Wilkes-Barre RailRiders of the Triple–A International League. After the season, he played for the Aguilas del Zulia of the Venezuelan Professional Baseball League.

Pirela began the 2014 season with the Scranton/Wilkes-Barre RailRiders. He ended the International League season with a .305 batting average (5th in the league), 87 runs (leading the league), 11 triples (leading the league), 10 home runs, and 60 runs batted in (RBI). He was named a midseason All-Star, a postseason All-Star, and an MiLB.com Organization All Star.

==== Major leagues ====
On September 16, 2014, the Yankees promoted Pirela to the major leagues. He made his major league debut on September 22, hitting a triple in his first at bat, and a single later in the game. In seven games with the Yankees in 2014, he batted .333 with two triples and three RBIs. On September 25, 2014, Pirela's single in the Yankees' last home game of the season against the Baltimore Orioles set up Derek Jeter's walk-off hit in his final at-bat at Yankee Stadium. Pirela singled to leftfield and subsequently replaced by pinch-runner Antoan Richardson, who scored the winning run on Jeter's hit.

Pirela suffered a concussion on March 22, 2015, in a spring training game against the New York Mets while playing center field. He ran into the outfield wall while chasing a fly ball. On April 2, he was placed on the 7-day disabled list to begin the season due to his concussion, and a week later he was transferred to the 15-day disabled list. On June 7, he hit his first major league home run against the Los Angeles Angels. He batted .256 with 1 RBI in 18 games before he was optioned to Scranton/Wilkes-Barre on June 10.

=== San Diego Padres ===
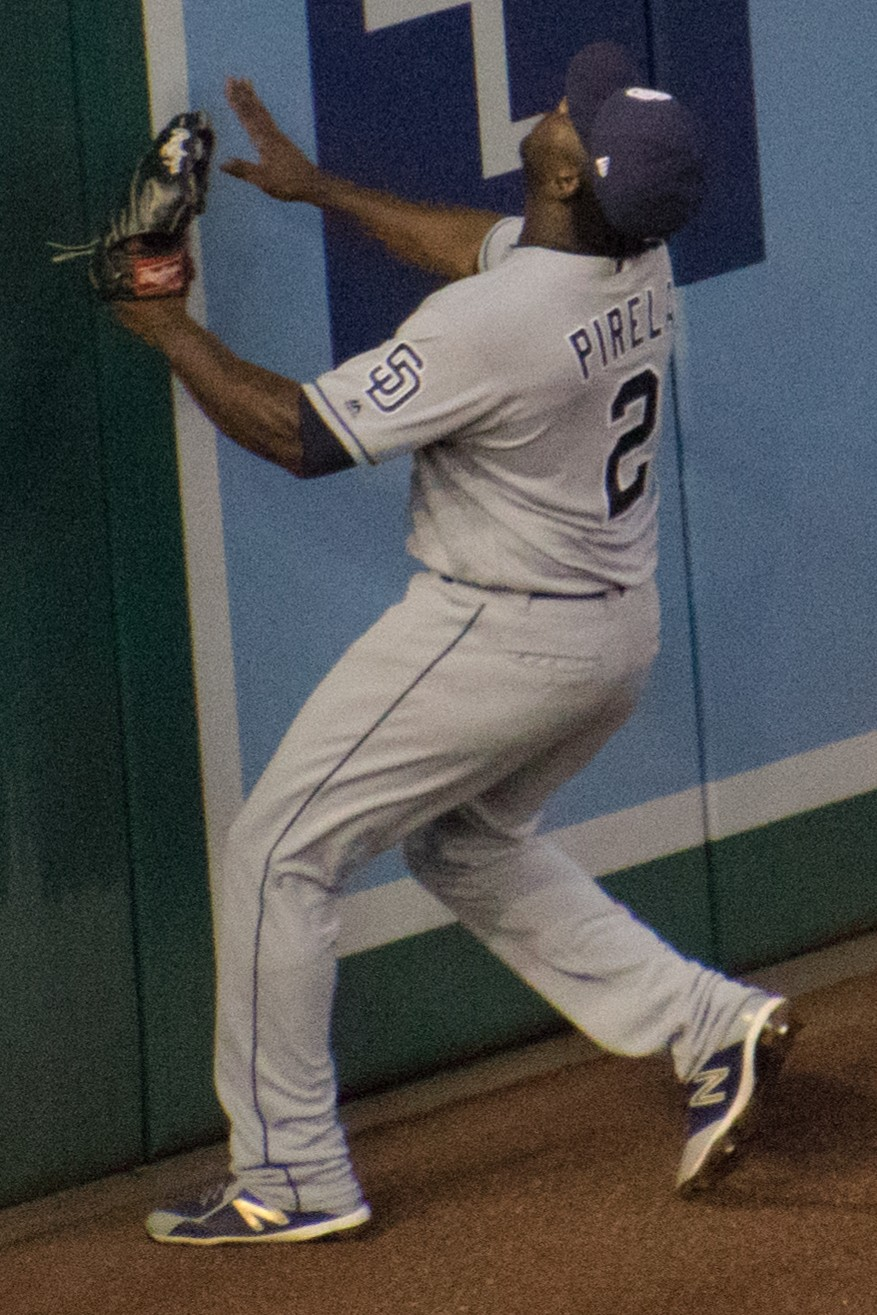
Pirela during his tenure with the San Diego Padres in 2018

On November 11, 2015, the Yankees traded Pirela to the San Diego Padres for minor league pitcher Ronald Herrera. He began the 2016 season with the El Paso Chihuahuas of the Triple–A Pacific Coast League, and was promoted to the Padres on April 22. Pirela played in 15 games with the Padres in 2016, making nine starts at second base and one in right field, before being optioned to El Paso when Yangervis Solarte was activated from the disabled list on May 21. Pirela was shut down in June with an Achilles tendon injury after playing in only 35 minor league games on the season. He had originally hurt the Achilles in the spring and it affected his performance all season. Pirela was non-tendered in the 2016 offseason, and became a free agent. He re–signed with San Diego on a minor league contract on December 13, 2016.

Pirela began the 2017 season with El Paso, where he batted .331/.387/.635 with 13 home runs in 181 at bats. The Padres promoted Pirela to the Major Leagues on June 6. Pirela was slotted into left field and impressed with his bat, securing the number three spot in the batting order by August and holding onto the left field position after Opening Day left fielder Travis Jankowski came off the disabled list. Pirela saw his season ended in mid-September with a sprained finger, but he led the Padres regulars in batting average, on-base percentage, and slugging percentage, and was the Padres nominee for the Hank Aaron Award. He finished 2017 with a .288/.347/.490 batting line with 10 home runs and 40 RBIs in 83 games, playing 72 games in the outfield, 7 games at second base, 5 games at first base, and 1 game at third base.

Pirela began 2018 as a starter for the Padres, but he saw his playing time significantly shrink as the season progressed. He began the season as the regular left fielder, but took over second base from Carlos Asuaje in May as Franchy Cordero moved over to left. When Asuaje was recalled from El Paso on July 1 and moved back onto second base, Pirela had no regular position but continued to appear as a pinch hitter and utility player. In 2018 with San Diego he batted .249/.300/.345 with 5 home runs and 32 RBI in 146 games.

Pirela started the 2019 season in Triple–A but was recalled to the majors on April 19, 2019, before being placed on the injured list with an oblique strain five days later. For El Paso he batted .353/.401/.674 with 18 home runs in 221 at bats. He was designated for assignment on July 22.

=== Philadelphia Phillies ===
On July 27, 2019, the Padres traded Pirela to the Philadelphia Phillies in exchange for cash considerations. With the Triple–A Lehigh Valley IronPigs he batted .281/.331/.455 with four home runs and 14 RBI in 121 at bats. With the Phillies he batted .235/.316/.471 with one home run and two RBI in 17 at bats.

In the major leagues through 2019, Pirela had played 127 games at second base, 105 games in left field, 14 games at first base, 14 games in right field, and one game at third base.

=== Hiroshima Toyo Carp ===
On November 2, 2019, Pirela signed with the Hiroshima Toyo Carp of Nippon Professional Baseball (NPB). On June 19, 2020, he made his NPB debut. In 99 games for the Carp, Pirela batted .266/.312/.411 with 11 home runs and 34 RBI. On December 2, Pirela became a free agent.

=== Samsung Lions ===
On December 16, 2020, Pirela signed with the Samsung Lions of the KBO League for $600,000 in salary and signing bonus, with an additional $200k possible from incentives. Pirela led the team with 29 home runs and 97 RBIs in 140 games played. On December 16, 2021, Pirela re-signed with the club for the 2022 season for $800,000 in salary and signing bonus, with an additional $400k possible from incentives. Pirela was named a KBO All-Star in 2022. On December 7, 2022, Pirela re-signed a one-year deal for the 2023 season worth $1.7 million.

Pirela was named a KBO All–Star for the second time in 2023. In 139 games for Samsung, he batted .286/.339/.426 with 16 home runs and 80 RBI.

=== Diablos Rojos del México ===
On January 26, 2024, Pirela signed with the Diablos Rojos del México of the Mexican League. In 23 appearances for the Diablos, he slashed .333/.414/.480 with two home runs, 11 RBI, and three stolen bases. With the team, Pirela won the Serie del Rey.

Pirela made 27 appearances for México during the 2025 campaign, batting .231/.293/.363 with three home runs, 12 RBI, and four stolen bases. With the team, he won his second consecutive Serie del Rey.

== Playing style ==
Pirela is a free-swinger in the batter's box, with a 6.4% walk rate in the major leagues. Despite this, he has kept his strikeout rate at 19.9%. In the field, Pirela has appeared in the majors at first base, second base, third base, and in both of the outfield corners.

== See also ==
- List of Major League Baseball players from Venezuela
