= Dinelson Lamet =

Dominican baseball player (born 1992)

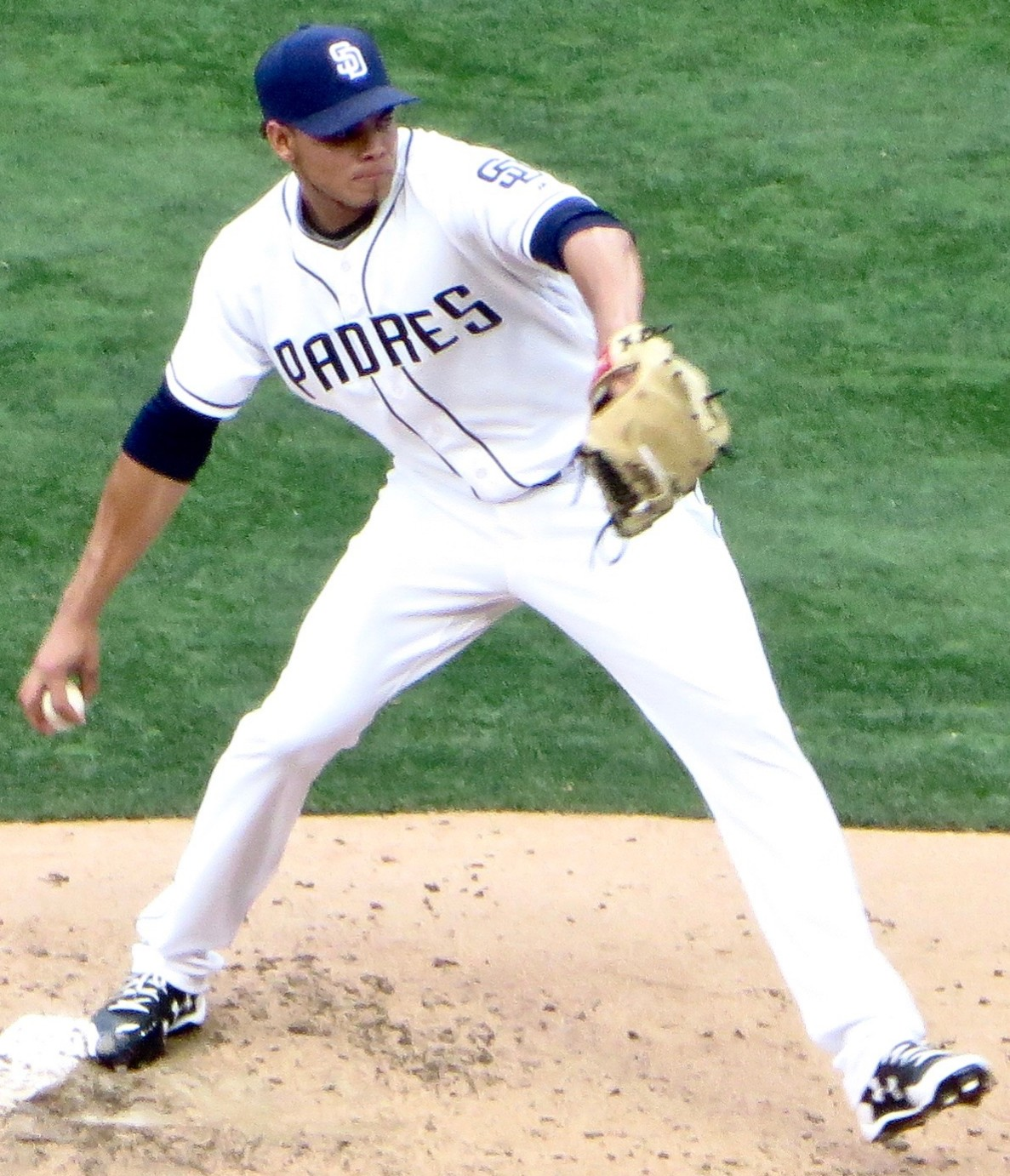
- Lamet with the San Diego Padres in 2017

El Águila de Veracruz – No. 29
- Pitcher
- Born: July 18, 1992 (age 34); Santiago de los Caballeros, Dominican Republic
- Bats: Right Throws: Right

Professional debut
- MLB: May 25, 2017, for the San Diego Padres
- CPBL: August 24, 2025, for the TSG Hawks

MLB statistics (through 2024 season)
- Win–loss record: 17–24
- Earned run average: 4.63
- Strikeouts: 474

CPBL statistics (through 2025 season)
- Win–loss record: 0–4
- Earned run average: 4.19
- Strikeouts: 28
- Stats at Baseball Reference

Teams
- San Diego Padres (2017, 2019–2022); Colorado Rockies (2022–2023); Boston Red Sox (2023); Los Angeles Dodgers (2024); TSG Hawks (2025)

Dinelson Lamet Hernandez (born July 18, 1992) is a Dominican professional baseball pitcher for El Águila de Veracruz of the Mexican League. He has previously played in Major League Baseball (MLB) for the San Diego Padres, Colorado Rockies, Boston Red Sox, and Los Angeles Dodgers, and in the Chinese Professional Baseball League (CPBL) for the TSG Hawks.

== Career ==
=== San Diego Padres ===
An international free agent, Lamet agreed to a contract with the Philadelphia Phillies in 2012, but a problem with his documentation prevented the deal from being completed. The San Diego Padres signed him in June 2014 for a $100,000 signing bonus and he made his professional debut in the Dominican Summer League (DSL) with the DSL Padres, and pitched to a 2.99 earned run average (ERA) for the Fort Wayne TinCaps of the Single-A Midwest League in 2015. In 2016, Lamet began the season with the Lake Elsinore Storm of the High-A California League.

The Padres promoted Lamet to the San Antonio Missions of the Double-A Texas League and then to the El Paso Chihuahuas of the Triple-A Pacific Coast League. He finished 2016 posting a 12–10 win–loss record with a 3.00 ERA. He returned to El Paso to start the 2017 season and made his major league debut on May 25 as the starting pitcher for the Padres against the New York Mets. He struck out the first batter he faced (Michael Conforto) and allowed one run in five innings with eight strikeouts to pick up the win. He made 21 starts in 2017 with a 9–12 record and 4.57 ERA.

After being named to the Padres' Opening Day roster in 2018, Lamet injured the ulnar collateral ligament (UCL) in the elbow of his throwing arm. He underwent Tommy John surgery and missed the entire 2018 season. In 2019, he rehabbed for Lake Elsinore and El Paso before being activated from the injured list on July 4. In 14 starts, he recorded an ERA of 4.07 with a record of 3–5. He struck out 105 batters in 73 innings. In the pandemic shortened 2020 season, Lamet finished with a 3–1 record and a 2.09 ERA, in 12 starts. However, he was unavailable for the playoffs due to a bicep injury.

After spending the beginning of the 2021 season recovering from a UCL sprain, Lamet made his season debut as the starting pitcher against the Milwaukee Brewers on April 21. However, he was removed from the start after two innings and 29 pitches after experiencing right forearm tightness. Lamet pitched in 22 games in the 2021 season, only nine of which were starts. He recorded a 4.40 ERA and 57 strikeouts in 47 innings. In 2022, he worked entirely out of the bullpen, pitching 12 1/3 innings over 13 games with a 9.49 ERA.

=== Colorado Rockies ===
On August 1, 2022, the Padres traded Lamet, Taylor Rogers, Esteury Ruiz, and Robert Gasser to the Milwaukee Brewers in exchange for Josh Hader. However, he was designated for assignment two days later; the Brewers president of baseball operations, David Stearns, said "the roster fit became a little tougher" after the team made subsequent transactions at the August 2 trade deadline. Two days later, he was claimed off waivers by the Colorado Rockies. In 19 games down the stretch, he recorded a 4.05 ERA with 29 strikeouts in 20 innings of work.

In 2023, Lamet made 16 appearances (four starts) for Colorado, but struggled to an 11.57 ERA with 31 strikeouts in 25 2/3 innings pitched. He was designated for assignment on June 17 and released on June 22.

=== Boston Red Sox ===
On June 28, 2023, Lamet signed a minor-league contract with the Boston Red Sox organization and was assigned to the Triple–A Worcester Red Sox where he posted a 3.72 ERA with 16 strikeouts in 19 1/3 innings pitched over three games. On August 7, the Red Sox selected his contract and added him to their major-league roster, with the intent of using him as a reliever. Lamet's struggles in the major leagues continued, as he made his Red Sox debut the next day against the Kansas City Royals, pitching two innings, giving up three runs and striking out one. He was designated for assignment the next day, and later sent outright to Worcester on August 12. However, on August 14, Lamet rejected the assignment in favor of free agency.

=== Los Angeles Dodgers ===
On February 3, 2024, Lamet signed a minor league contract with the Los Angeles Dodgers and was assigned to the Triple–A Oklahoma City Baseball Club to start the season. However, the Dodgers recalled him to the major leagues on April 1, before he had appeared in any minor league games. On April 3, Lamet picked up his first career save against the San Francisco Giants. In three appearances for Los Angeles, he logged a 2.08 ERA with three strikeouts across 4 1/3 innings. Lamet was designated for assignment by the Dodgers on April 6 and outrighted to Oklahoma City on April 8. He pitched in nine games in the minors, with a 3–1 record and 4.82 ERA. Lamet triggered an opt–out clause in his contract and elected free agency on June 4.

=== Kansas City Royals ===
On July 19, 2024, Lamet signed a minor league contract with the Kansas City Royals organization. In 10 starts for the Triple-A Omaha Storm Chasers, he compiled a 5–3 record and 4.81 ERA with 35 strikeouts across 48 2/3 innings pitched. Lamet elected free agency following the season on November 4.

=== El Águila de Veracruz ===
On February 27, 2025, Lamet signed with El Águila de Veracruz of the Mexican League. In 17 starts for Veracruz, Lamet compiled a 7–5 record and 5.01 ERA with 88 strikeouts over 88 innings of work.

=== TSG Hawks ===
On August 5, 2025, Lamet signed with the TSG Hawks of the Chinese Professional Baseball League. He made six starts for the Hawks, logging an 0–4 record and 4.19 ERA with 28 strikeouts across 34 1/3 innings pitched. Lamet became a free agent following the season.

=== El Águila de Veracruz (second stint) ===
On February 14, 2026, Lamet signed with El Águila de Veracruz of the Mexican League.
