= Andy Green (baseball) =

American baseball player and manager (born 1977)

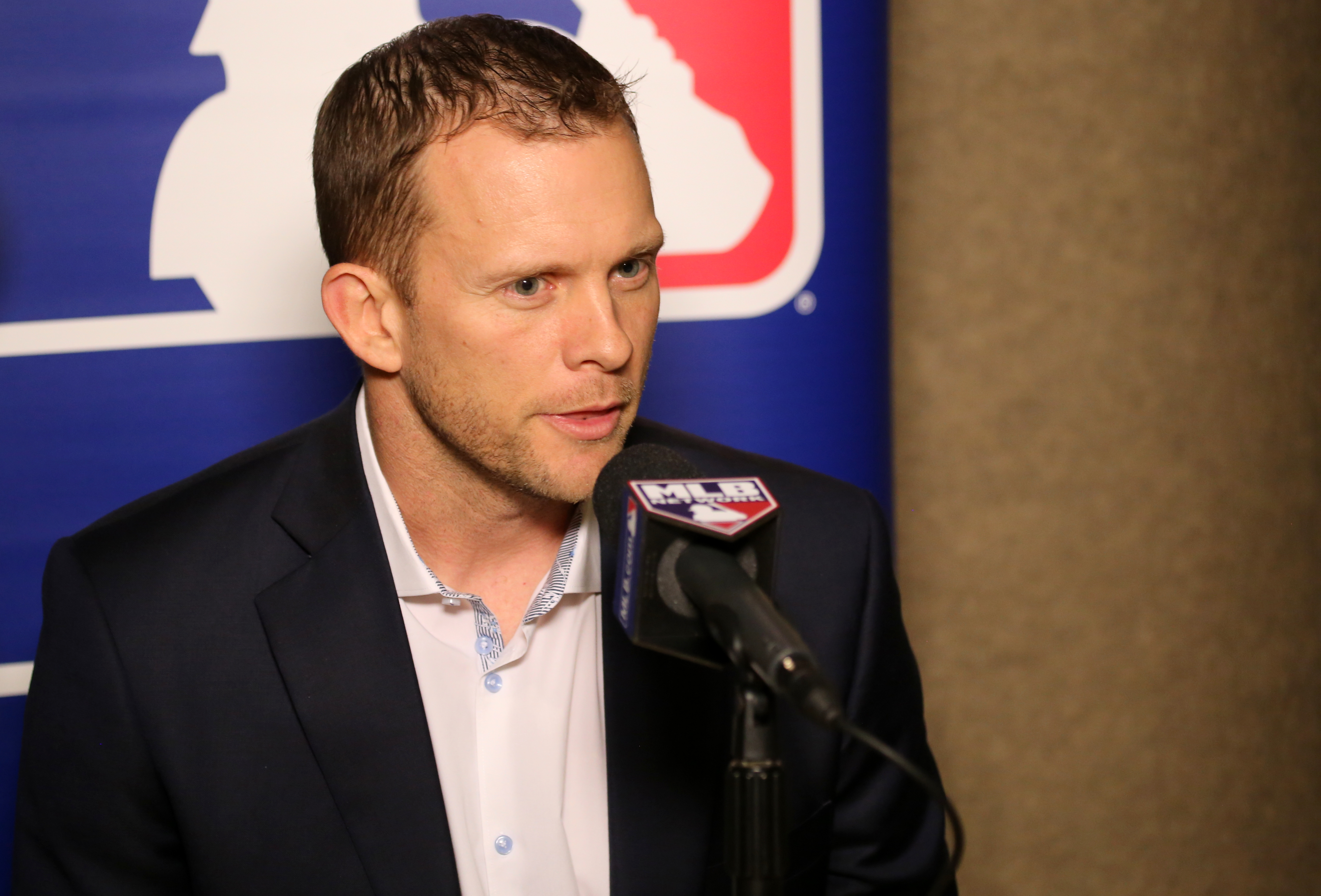
- Green at the 2015 Winter Meetings

New York Mets – No. 70
- Utility player / Manager
- Born: July 7, 1977 (age 49); Lexington, Kentucky, U.S.
- Batted: Right Threw: Right

Professional debut
- MLB: June 12, 2004, for the Arizona Diamondbacks
- NPB: March 24, 2007, for the Hokkaido Nippon Ham Fighters

Last appearance
- NPB: April 17, 2007, for the Hokkaido Nippon Ham Fighters
- MLB: August 21, 2009, for the New York Mets

MLB statistics (through 2026 season)
- Batting average: .200
- Home runs: 2
- Runs batted in: 12
- Managerial record: 314–407
- Winning %: .436

NPB statistics
- Batting average: .197
- Home runs: 0
- Runs batted in: 3
- Stats at Baseball Reference
- Managerial record at Baseball Reference

Teams
- As player: Arizona Diamondbacks (2004–2006); Hokkaido Nippon Ham Fighters (2007); New York Mets (2009); As manager: San Diego Padres (2016–2019); New York Mets (2026–present); As coach: Arizona Diamondbacks (2015); Chicago Cubs (2020–2023)

Andrew Mulligan Green (born July 7, 1977) is an American former professional baseball utility player who is the manager for the New York Mets of Major League Baseball (MLB). He served as the manager for the San Diego Padres from 2016 to 2019 and has also served as third base coach for the Arizona Diamondbacks and bench coach of the Chicago Cubs.

He was a versatile fielder, who had the ability to play in almost all of the positions in baseball. After making his debut, he played second base, third base, shortstop, and in the outfield. He threw and batted right-handed, stood 5 feet 9 inches (1.75 m) tall and weighed 165 pounds (75 kg) as an active player.

He was a consistent .300 hitter in the minor leagues, won a Pacific Coast League MVP award, and played in the majors for three years with the Arizona Diamondbacks. After a year with the Nippon Ham Fighters in Japan, he played in the Cincinnati Reds organization and returned to MLB for a brief time in 2009 with the New York Mets.

== Playing career ==
=== Amateur career ===
Andy Green was named Kentucky High School Scholar-Athlete of the Year and National Christian Scholar-Athlete of the Year in 1996 and also served as his high school class valedictorian. He attended the University of Kentucky on an academic scholarship. He earned a BA in business administration (finance), graduating Summa Cum Laude (3.89 GPA). He broke five school records at UK and set longstanding school records in hits (277) and runs scored (199). As a senior in 2000, he batted .368 with a slugging percentage of .603 and stole 27 bases. He was inducted into the University of Kentucky Athletics Hall of Fame in 2015. The Arizona Diamondbacks took him in the 24th round of the 2000 Major League Baseball draft.

=== 2000–2003: Minors ===
Green spent most of his first pro season with the Missoula Osprey, hitting .229/.324/.277 and going 8 for 11 in steals. He was 0 for 9 in 3 games for the South Bend Silver Hawks. Arizona did not let him go, though, and he improved in 2001, batting .300/.379/.394 for South Bend and stealing 51 of 66 bases. He was 60 steals behind Midwest League (MWL) leader Chris Morris but led MWL second basemen in fielding percentage (.973), putouts (234), assists (336) and double plays (63) and was selected by Baseball America as MWL Best Defensive Second Baseman.

In 2002, Green hit .222/.294/.333 in a 27-game glance at Triple-A with the Tucson Sidewinders but spent most of the year in High-A, where the 24/25-year-old batted .309/.401/.464 with the Lancaster JetHawks. He drove 36 doubles and had 15 steals but was thrown out 10 times. His 44 doubles between the two teams put him 5th in the minor leagues that year. He was three doubles away from the California League lead and was 5th in the league in batting average. On August 21, he hit for the cycle, going 4 for 5 with a 9th-inning homer to seal the deal; it was one of just six home runs he clubbed that year for Lancaster.

Green had his third .300 stop in 2003 with the El Paso Diablos, posting a .302/.366/.400 line, doubling 38 times (only four other extra-base hits) and stealing 17 in 26 tries. He tied Justin Leone for the Texas League lead in doubles and was third in average, trailing Ramón Nivar and Jake Weber.

=== 2004–2006: Tucson and Arizona ===
Andy returned to Tucson in 2004 and hit .327/.394/.534 with 31 doubles in 77 games. That earned him a call-up to the Diamondbacks, where he only managed a .202/.241/.266 line in 46 games as a backup infielder. His first big-league hit was a pinch-hit homer against José Contreras. Green had his biggest minor league season in 2005. He batted .343/.422/.587 with the Sidewinders with 46 doubles, 13 triples, 19 homers and 125 runs in 135 games while rapping 182 hits. In addition to second, he played third, short and the outfield. He led the Pacific Coast League in runs, hits, total bases (311), doubles and triples and was 6th in average. He reached base in 54 consecutive games at one point and almost doubled his career home run total. He tied for 8th in the minors in average, scored 11 more runs than any other minor league that year, was second in the minors in hits, second in total bases, tied for third in doubles and second in extra-base hits. Baseball America named him a second-team minor league All-Star behind Howie Kendrick among second basemen on the farm and the top 2B in AAA. He was named to the PCL All-Star team at second base and won the league MVP award.

In a September call-up to Arizona, Andy managed a .226/.359/.258 line in 17 games.

Green won the final spot on the 2006 Diamondbacks roster but was rarely used, hitting .186/.293/.267 as a backup infielder and in the difficult role of pinch-hitting (though he batted .234/.345/.362 in 56 pinch-hit games). He only got nine starts during the year. He also briefly appeared with Tucson in a rehab stint, batting only .240/.288/.320 in 18 games there.

=== 2007: Japan ===
After the 2006 season ended, Andy began a long series of negotiations with the Hokkaido Nippon-Ham Fighters, who had just won the 2006 Japan Series but had lost star Michihiro Ogasawara to free agency and outfielder Tsuyoshi Shinjo to retirement. In late November, Arizona, sold Green's rights to Nippon Ham, which signed him for a $50,000 bonus and $660,000 salary for 2007. There was an option for Nippon Ham for 2008 for $850,000 with a $100,000 buyout clause.

Green battled injuries and spent much of his Japanese term in ni-gun. He was placed on waivers in late August.

=== 2008–2009: Return to the majors ===
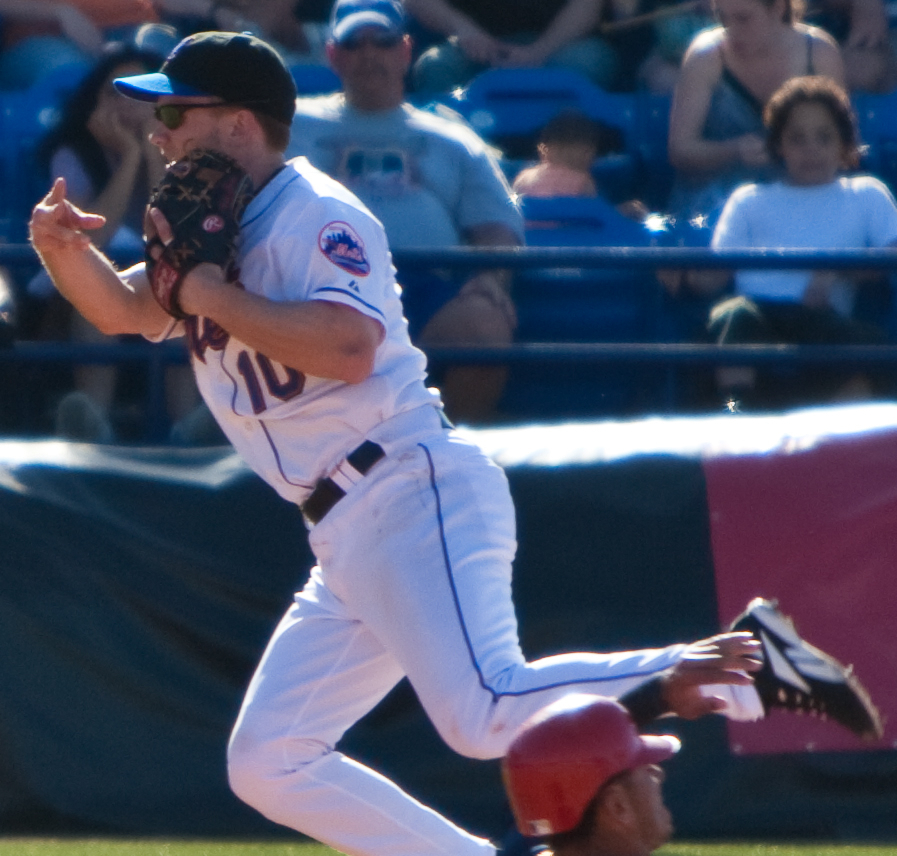
Green with the Mets during spring training in 2009

Late in 2007, Green was signed by the Cincinnati Reds. He began the 2008 season with the Louisville Bats, where he hit .233 in 71 games. He was released on July 1, then was picked up by the New York Mets organization, where he suddenly started hitting very well. He batted .331 with 8 home runs (13 on the season) in 52 games with the New Orleans Zephyrs of the PCL to give the Mets a reason to keep him for another year. He returned to the Major Leagues for 4 games with the Mets in 2009, going 1 for 4. It pushed his lifetime Major League batting average above the Mendoza Line. He spent most of the season with the Buffalo Bisons of the International League, hitting .259 in 50 games. He spent the majority of the season on the disabled list and had rehabilitation assignments with the GCL Mets and the Brooklyn Cyclones of the New York–Penn League.

On January 5, 2010, Green signed a minor league contract with an invitation to spring training with the New York Mets. He was released after the season.

== Coach and managerial career ==
Green led the Missoula Osprey to the Pioneer League Championship in 2012. In 2013, after leading the Mobile BayBears to consecutive first and second half division titles, he was named Southern League's Manager of the Year. Green was named the 2014 Southern League manager of the year and was the first manager in Southern League history to win that award in consecutive years.

In 2015, Green served as the third base coach for the Arizona Diamondbacks.

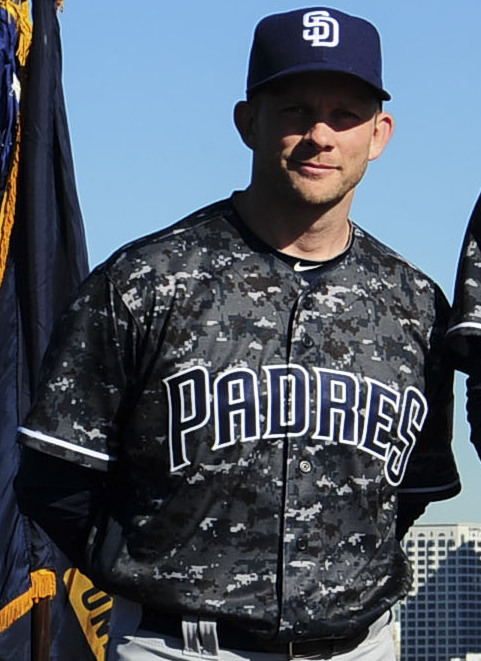
Green with the San Diego Padres in 2016

After spending one season as a third base coach for the Diamondbacks, on October 29, 2015, Green was named manager of the San Diego Padres. Green's first managerial ejection occurred on April 19, 2016, during a game against the Pittsburgh Pirates. After a balk was called on Padres pitcher Colin Rea, then reversed, then called again, Green came out to argue with umpires Mark Carlson and Brian Gorman. Gorman eventually ejected Green, and Green had to be escorted back to the dugout by bench coach Mark McGwire. Green's first season was marred by a rebuild, as the Padres front office traded away veterans James Shields, Melvin Upton Jr., and Matt Kemp, leading to a 68–94 season.

On August 13, 2017, the San Diego Padres announced that they had extended Green through the 2021 season.

Green was fired by the Padres on September 21, 2019. The team had posted a 69–85 record under him up to that point in the season and a 274–366 record overall during his tenure. Bench coach Rod Barajas replaced Green as interim manager for the remainder of the season.

On December 9, 2019, Green was hired as the bench coach of the Chicago Cubs under new manager David Ross. Upon the hiring of Craig Counsell to replace Ross, Green departed the Cubs and joined the Mets organization within the team's front office as the team's Senior Vice President for Player Development.

On June 26, 2026, the Mets fired manager Carlos Mendoza and named Green their interim manager. On September 22, the Mets removed the interim tag, as Green was named the club's manager, having signed a three-year deal.

=== Managerial record ===
As of September 27, 2026

Team	Year	Regular season					Postseason			
Team	Year	Games	Won	Lost	Win %	Finish	Won	Lost	Win %	Result
SD	2016	162	68	94	.420	5th in NL West	–	–	–	–
SD	2017	162	71	91	.438	4th in NL West	–	–	–	–
SD	2018	162	66	96	.407	5th in NL West	–	–	–	–
SD	2019	154	69	85	.448	(fired)	–	–	–	–
SD total		640	274	366	.428					
NYM	2026	81	40	41	.494	5th in NL East	–	–	–	
NYM total		81	40	41	.494					
Total		721	314	407	.436					

== Personal life ==
Green and his wife Jessica live in Tennessee. They have three daughters: Lainey, born circa 2007, and twins Emily and Anna, who are two years younger.

Sporting positions
Preceded by Glenn Sherlock	Arizona Diamondbacks third base coach 2015	Succeeded by Matt Williams
Preceded by Bud Black; Dave Roberts (interim); Pat Murphy (interim)	San Diego Padres manager 2016–19	Succeeded by Rod Barajas (interim); Jayce Tingler
Preceded by Mark Loretta	Chicago Cubs bench coach 2020–2023	Succeeded by Ryan Flaherty
Preceded by Carlos Mendoza	New York Mets manager 2026–present	Succeeded by Current
