= Buddy Baumann (baseball) =

American baseball player (born 1987)

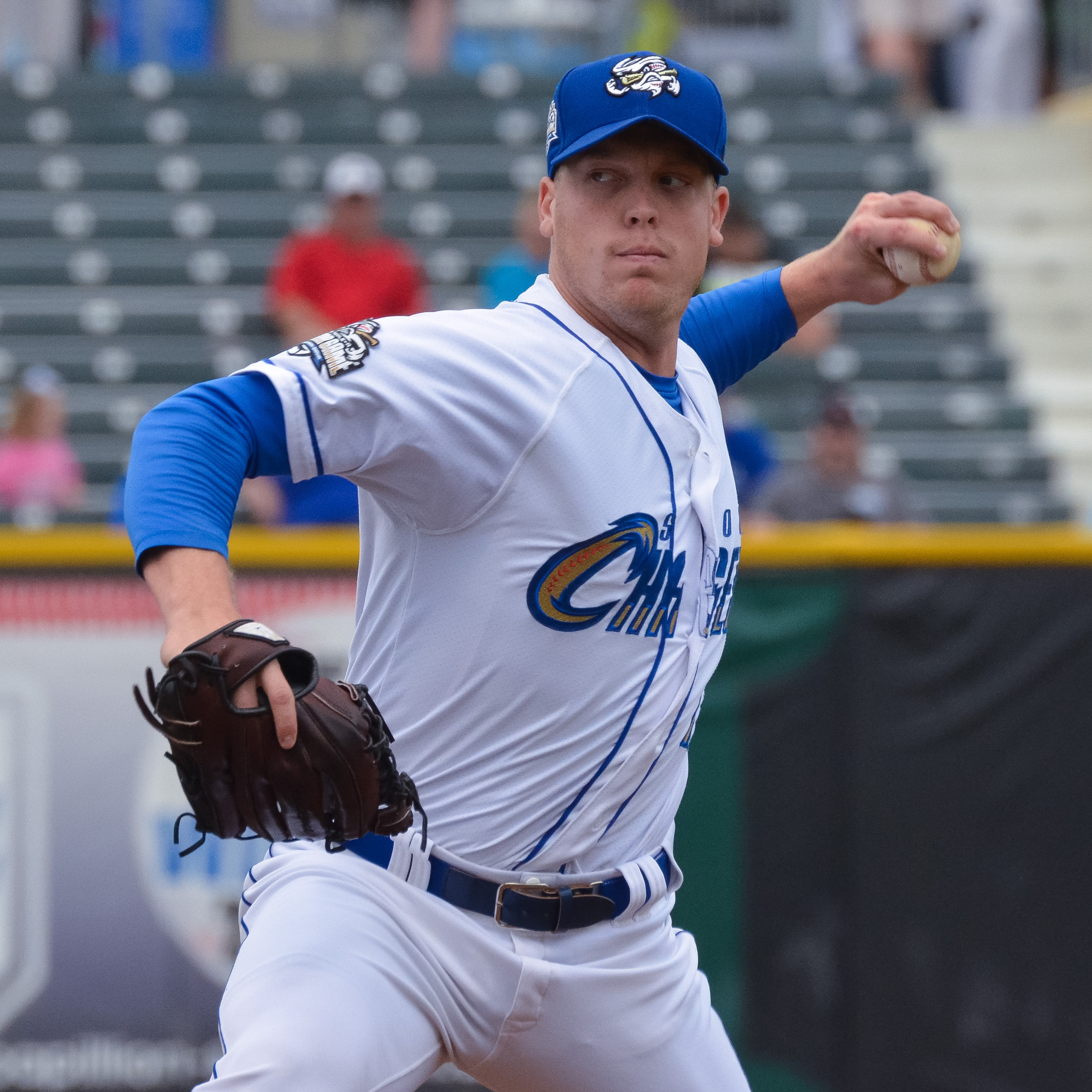
- Baumann pitching for the Omaha Storm Chasers in 2015
- Pitcher
- Born: December 9, 1987 (age 38); Chicago, Illinois, U.S.
- Batted: Left Threw: Left

Professional debut
- MLB: July 16, 2016, for the San Diego Padres
- CPBL: October 21, 2022, for the Wei Chuan Dragons

Last appearance
- MLB: June 2, 2018, for the New York Mets
- CPBL: October 21, 2022, for the Wei Chuan Dragons

MLB statistics
- Win–loss record: 3–3
- Earned run average: 5.58
- Strikeouts: 35

CPBL statistics
- Win–loss record: 1–0
- Earned run average: 0.00
- Strikeouts: 5
- Stats at Baseball Reference

Teams
- San Diego Padres (2016–2018); New York Mets (2018); Wei Chuan Dragons (2022)
Medals
Men's baseball
Representing United States
Pan American Games
| Silver medal – second place | 2015 Toronto | Team |

George Charles Baumann IV (born December 9, 1987) is an American former professional baseball pitcher. He played in Major League Baseball (MLB) for the San Diego Padres and the New York Mets, and in the Chinese Professional Baseball League (CPBL) for the Wei Chuan Dragons.

== Playing career ==
=== Amateur ===
Prior to playing professionally, he attended Logan-Rogersville High School and then Missouri State University. In 2008, he played collegiate summer baseball with the Brewster Whitecaps of the Cape Cod Baseball League, and was named a league all-star. In 2009, Baumann was named the Missouri Valley Conference Pitcher of the Year, a finalist for the National Pitcher of the Year Award and a semifinalist for the Golden Spikes Award.

=== Kansas City Royals ===
He was selected by the Kansas City Royals in the 7th round of the 2009 MLB draft and was signed by scout Scott Melvin.

He allowed three runs (one earned) in five innings for the Burlington Royals that summer, throwing three wild pitches. In 2010, he was 4–2 with four saves and a 2.24 ERA in 31 games (14 starts) for the Wilmington Blue Rocks. He struck out 113 batters in 100 1/3 innings. In 2011, he was 4–3, with 2 saves and a 4.29 ERA in 25 games for the Northwest Arkansas Naturals and 0–1 with 3 runs in 4.2 IP for the AZL Royals.

He went 3–2 with two saves and a 4.12 ERA for Northwest Arkansas in 2012, walking 33 in 59 IP. In 2013, Baumann was 3–0 with a save and a 2.55 ERA in 32 games split between the Naturals and Triple-A Omaha Storm Chasers. He struck out 72 batters in 53 innings.

Baumann elected free agency following the season on November 6, 2015.

=== San Diego Padres ===
On December 21, 2015, he signed a one-year major league contract with the San Diego Padres.

On July 15, 2016, Baumann was promoted to the major leagues for the first time. He made his MLB debut on July 16, throwing one pitch to Brandon Crawford of the San Francisco Giants and recording an out. He was demoted on the following day. He became only the twelfth player to throw only one pitch in his MLB debut.

Baumann was a solid reliever ending the 2016 season with a 3.74 ERA in 9.2 innings pitched, allowing a .200 batting average against batters.

On April 13, 2018, Baumann was suspended for one game for his involvement in a brawl with the Colorado Rockies two days prior. He was designated for assignment on April 24.

=== New York Mets ===
On April 27, 2018, Baumann was claimed off waivers by the New York Mets. The Mets added Baumann to their active roster on May 11 after placing Hansel Robles on the disabled list. On June 5, Baumann was designated for assignment. He elected free agency following the season on November 2.

=== Lancaster Barnstormers ===
On April 5, 2019, Baumann signed with the Lancaster Barnstormers of the Atlantic League of Professional Baseball. In 17 games (16 starts), he compiled a 4–8 record and 3.48 ERA with 92 strikeouts across 101 innings pitched. Baumann announced his retirement from professional baseball on August 6.

=== Baltimore Orioles ===
On March 2, 2022, Baumann came out of retirement to sign a minor league contract with the Baltimore Orioles. Baumann was released by the Orioles on April 6, before he made an appearance for the organization.

=== Lincoln Saltdogs ===
On April 18, 2022, Baumann signed with the Lincoln Saltdogs of the American Association of Professional Baseball. In a May 28 start against the Winnipeg Goldeyes, Baumann set the Lincoln single–game franchise record for strikeouts, punching out 15 in the appearance. He was named the Pitcher of the Week following the performance. In 5 appearances for the Saltdogs, Baumann recorded a 1–1 record and 2.03 ERA with 40 strikeouts in 26 2/3 innings pitched.

=== Acereros de Monclova ===
On June 12, 2022, Baumann signed with the Acereros de Monclova of the Mexican League. In 8 starts, Baumann went 3–1 with a 3.72 ERA and 30 strikeouts across 36 1/3 innings of work.

=== Wei Chuan Dragons ===
On September 19, 2022, Baumann signed with the Wei Chuan Dragons of the Chinese Professional Baseball League. He became a free agent following the 2022 season, having made only one appearance for the Dragons.

== Coaching career ==
In 2020, Baumann served as the pitching coach for the Arizona Complex League Angels of the Los Angeles Angels organization. Baumann reprised the role for the 2021 season.

== Pitching style ==
Baumann has five pitches: a four-seam fastball that tops off at 92 mph, cutter which hovers around 81 mph, a two-seam fastball around 81 mph, a changeup hovering at 82 mph, and a slider that is around 86 mph.
