= Kyle McGrath =

American baseball player (born 1992)

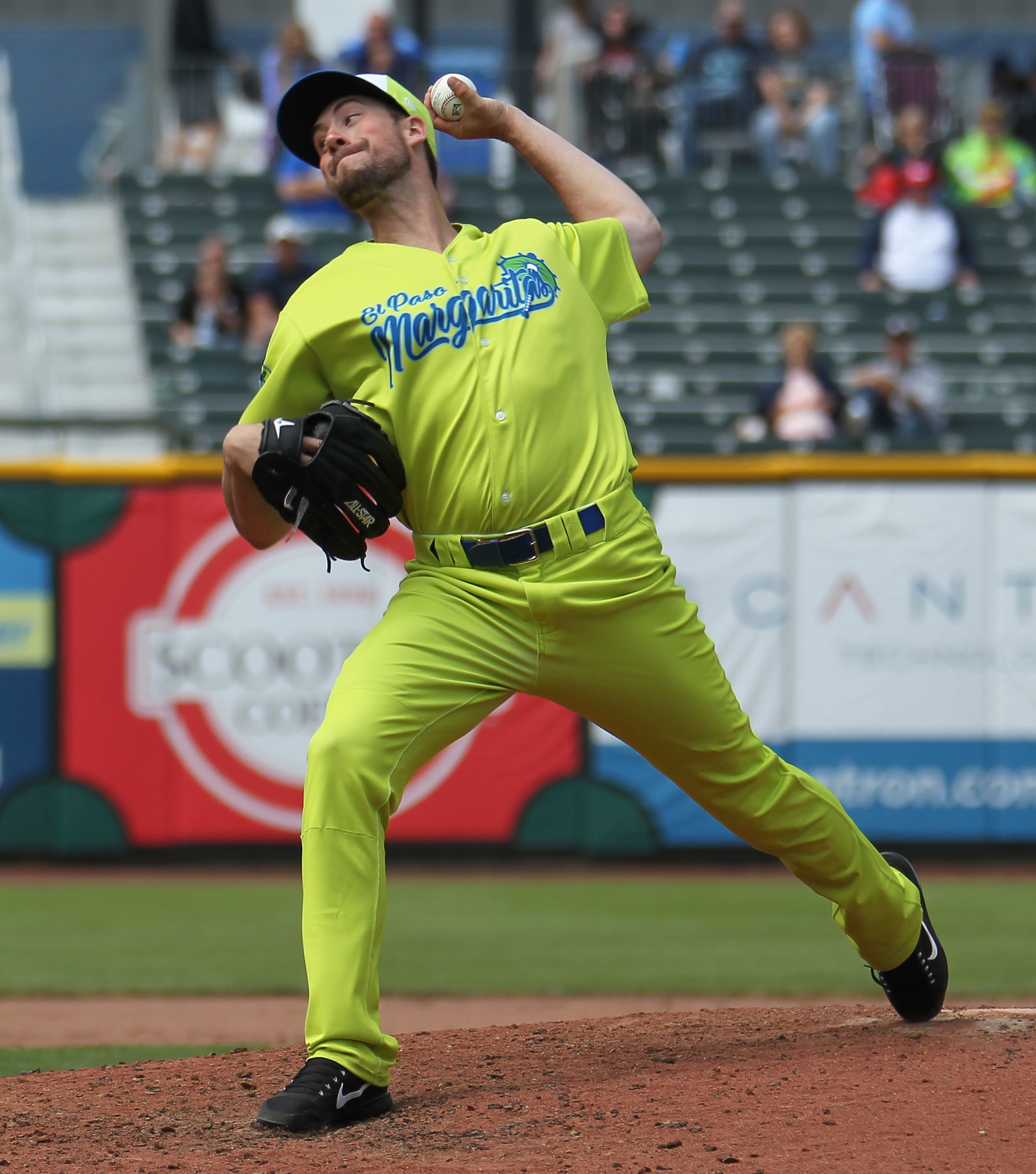
- McGrath with the El Paso Chihuahuas in 2019
- Pitcher
- Born: July 31, 1992 (age 33); Louisville, Kentucky, U.S.
- Batted: Left Threw: Left

MLB debut
- July 30, 2017, for the San Diego Padres

Last MLB appearance
- April 16, 2018, for the San Diego Padres

MLB statistics
- Win–loss record: 0–0
- Earned run average: 3.13
- Strikeouts: 20
- Stats at Baseball Reference

Teams
- San Diego Padres (2017–2018)

Kyle Daniel McGrath (born July 31, 1992) is an American former professional baseball pitcher. He played in Major League Baseball (MLB) for the San Diego Padres.

== Career ==
McGrath was drafted by the San Diego Padres in the 36th round of the 2014 MLB draft out of the University of Louisville. He signed with the club on July 13, 2014, and was assigned to the AZL Padres.

McGrath began the 2015 season with the Fort Wayne TinCaps. He would briefly appear for the San Antonio Missions before being sent back down to the TinCaps to complete the season.

McGrath began the 2016 season with the Lake Elsinore Storm. He was promoted to the San Antonio Missions in May. On September 2, he was promoted to the El Paso Chihuahuas to finish the year.

On February 10, 2017, McGrath was invited to spring training with the Padres. He did not make the club out of spring training and was assigned to the San Antonio Missions to begin the year. He was called up to the majors for the first time on July 27, 2017. He would appear in 17 games for the Padres in 2017, pitching to a 2.84 ERA with 16 strikeouts in 19 innings pitched.

McGrath did not begin the 2018 season with the Padres, but was recalled on April 13. In 4 games for the Padres, McGrath pitches to a 4.50 ERA in 4 innings pitched, with 4 strikeouts, and 3 hits including two home runs. He was designated for assignment on May 27, 2018. He was outrighted on June 2. He completed the year with the El Paso Chihuahuas.

McGrath was invited to spring training on January 24, 2019, but did not make the club and began the year with the Chihuahuas. On April 22, McGrath was demoted to the Amarillo Sod Poodles, but was brought back up to El Paso on May 8. He resigned on a minor league deal on November 2, 2020.

In 2021, McGrath made 26 appearances for the Tripel-A El Paso Chihuahuas, posting an 8.06 ERA with 26 strikeouts in 41.1 innings of work. On September 17, McGrath was released by the Padres organization.
