= 2017 Oakland Athletics season =

2017 Oakland Athletics
- League: American League
- Division: West
- Ballpark: Oakland Coliseum
- City: Oakland, California
- Record: 75–87 (.463)
- Divisional place: 5th
- Owners: John Fisher
- General managers: Billy Beane
- Managers: Bob Melvin
- Television: NBC Sports California (Glen Kuiper, Ken Korach, Vince Cotroneo, Ray Fosse, Mark Mulder, Eric Chavez, Shooty Babitt)
- Radio: KGMZ (Ken Korach, Vince Cotroneo, Ray Fosse, Mark Mulder)

The 2017 Oakland Athletics season was the 50th for the Oakland Athletics franchise in Oakland, as well as the 117th in club history. The A's began the season on April 3 at home against Los Angeles Angels and finished the season at the Texas Rangers on October 1. They finished the season in last place in the American League West and did not make the playoffs for the third consecutive season, but did finish the season on a strong note with a winning record in September.

For the first time in several years, the Coliseum featured the entire baseball configuration. The tarp covering much of the baseball seating was removed, although it remained on Mt. Davis as that section is football-only.

== Offseason ==
=== October 2016 ===
October 6, 2016	Assigned RHP Chris Smith and C Matt McBride outright to Nashville (PCL).
October 6, 2016	Assigned RHPs Donn Roach, Fernando Rodriguez and J.B. Wendelken, INFs Tyler Ladendorf and Eric Sogard and OF Andrew Lambo outright to Nashville (PCL).
October 7, 2016	Assigned RHPs Henderson Alvarez and Jarrod Parker and LHP Felix Doubront outright to Nashville (PCL).
October 18, 2016	Named Chip Hale third base coach, Jeff Collins assistant athletic trainer and Josh Cuffe strength and conditioning coach.
October 26, 2016	Claimed LHP Giovany Soto off waivers from the Chicago Cubs.

=== November 2016 ===
November 4, 2016	Claimed RHP Josh Smith off waivers from Cincinnati.
November 7, 2016	Announced LHP Giovanny Soto was claimed off waivers by the Chicago White Sox.
November 15, 2016	Named Ed Sprague coordinator of instruction, Nate Brooks medical coordinator, Ryan Christenson manager and Henry Torres strength and conditioning coach of Nashville (PCL), Fran Riordan manager and Matt Rutledge strength and conditioning coach of Midland (TL), Scott Steinmann manager and Omar Aguilar strength and conditioning coach of Beloit (MWL), J.D. Howell strength and conditioning coach of Vermont (NYP).
November 19, 2016	Assigned RHP Josh Smith outright to Nashville (PCL). Selected the contracts of RHPs Paul Blackburn and Bobby Wahl, INF Franklin Barreto and OF Jaycob Brugman from Nashville and INF Yairo Munoz from Midland (TL).
November 30, 2016	Agreed to terms with OF Matt Joyce on a two-year contract. Designated INF Rangel Ravelo for assignment.

=== December 2016 ===
December 2, 2016	Agreed to terms with RHP Simon Castro and 3B Jermaine Curtis on minor league contracts.
December 2, 2016	Assigned INF Rangel Ravelo outright to Nashville. Agreed to terms with 1B Yonder Alonso on a one-year contract.
December 23, 2016	Agreed to terms with RHP Norge Ruiz on a minor league contract.

=== January 2017 ===
January 4, 2017	Agreed to terms with OF Rajai Davis on a one-year contract. Designated INF Max Muncy for assignment.
January 4, 2017	Named Don Schulze pitching coach of Midland (TL).
January 10, 2017	Assigned INF/OF Max Muncy outright to Nashville (PCL).
January 14, 2017	Agreed to terms with RHPs Sonny Gray and Liam Hendriks, and C Stephen Vogt on one-year contracts.
January 18, 2017	Designated RHP Zach Neal for assignment. Agreed to terms with INF Trevor Plouffe on a one-year contract.
January 20, 2017	Agreed to terms with RHP Santiago Casilla on a two-year contract and with LHP Ross Detwiler and OF Alejandro De Aza on minor league contracts. Designated OF Brett Eibner for assignment.
January 25, 2017	Assigned RHP Zach Neal outright to Nashville. Traded OF Brett Eibner to the L.A. Dodgers for INF Jordan Tarsovich. Designated LHP Dillon Overton for assignment. Agreed to terms with INF Adam Rosales on a one-year contract.

=== February 2017 ===
February 1, 2017	Agreed to terms with RHP Luis Miguel Romero and OF Enry Pantojas on minor league contracts.
February 3, 2017	Named Carlos Chavez pitching coach at Beloit (MWL), Bryan Corey pitching coach at Vermont (NYP), Shane Zdebiak athletic trainer at Stockton (Cal), and Ed Gitlitz minor league technology and development manager.

=== March 2017 ===
March 5, 2017	Reassigned RHPs Michael Brady, Trey Cochran-Gill, Heath Fillmyer, Tucker Healy, Aaron Kurcz and Josh Smith and LHP A. J. Puk to their minor league camp.
March 14, 2017	Optioned RHPs Paul Blackburn and Bobby Wahl, INF Yairo Munoz and OF Jaycob Brugman to Nashville (PCL).
March 17, 2017	Optioned INFs Franklin Barreto and Chad Pinder and OF Matt Olson to Nashville (PCL).
March 19, 2017	Reassigned RHPs Daniel Gossett and Chris Smith, Cs Matt McBride and Sean Murphy, and INF Max Schrock to their minor league camp.
March 26, 2017	Optioned RHP Jesse Hahn and C Bruce Maxwell to Nashville (PCL). Announced LHP Ross Detwiler opted out of minor league contract and is a free agent.
March 28, 2017	Released OF Alejandro De Aza.

== Spring training ==
The A's participated in the Cactus League during pre-season spring training, finishing with a 16–18 win–loss record and no ties.

== Regular season ==
=== American League West ===
AL West
Team	W	L	Pct.	GB	Home	Road
Houston Astros	101	61	.623	—	48‍–‍33	53‍–‍28
Los Angeles Angels	80	82	.494	21	43‍–‍38	37‍–‍44
Seattle Mariners	78	84	.481	23	40‍–‍41	38‍–‍43
Texas Rangers	78	84	.481	23	41‍–‍40	37‍–‍44
Oakland Athletics	75	87	.463	26	46‍–‍35	29‍–‍52

=== American League Wild Card ===
Division leaders
Team	W	L	Pct.
Cleveland Indians	102	60	.630
Houston Astros	101	61	.623
Boston Red Sox	93	69	.574

Wild Card teams (Top 2 teams qualify for postseason)
Team	W	L	Pct.	GB
New York Yankees	91	71	.562	+6
Minnesota Twins	85	77	.525	—
Kansas City Royals	80	82	.494	5
Los Angeles Angels	80	82	.494	5
Tampa Bay Rays	80	82	.494	5
Seattle Mariners	78	84	.481	7
Texas Rangers	78	84	.481	7
Toronto Blue Jays	76	86	.469	9
Baltimore Orioles	75	87	.463	10
Oakland Athletics	75	87	.463	10
Chicago White Sox	67	95	.414	18
Detroit Tigers	64	98	.395	21

=== Record against opponents ===
2017 American League record Source: MLB Standings Grid – 2017
Team	BAL	BOS	CWS	CLE	DET	HOU	KC	LAA	MIN	NYY	OAK	SEA	TB	TEX	TOR	NL
Baltimore	—	10–9	4–3	1–6	3–4	1–5	3–3	2–4	2–5	7–12	4–3	4–2	8–11	6–1	12–7	8–12
Boston	9–10	—	6–1	4–3	3–4	3–4	2–4	2–4	5–2	8–11	3–4	3–3	11–8	5–1	13–6	16–4
Chicago	3–4	1–6	—	6–13	10–9	4–2	10–9	3–4	7–12	3–4	1–5	3–4	3–3	4–3	3–3	6–14
Cleveland	6–1	3–4	13–6	—	13–6	5–1	12–7	6–0	12–7	5–2	3–4	4–2	4–3	6–1	4–2	6–14
Detroit	4–3	4–3	9–10	6–13	—	3–4	8–11	3–4	8–11	3–3	1–5	1–6	2–5	1–5	3–3	8–12
Houston	5–1	4–3	2–4	1–5	4–3	—	3–4	12–7	5–1	5–2	12–7	14–5	3–4	12–7	4–3	15–5
Kansas City	3–3	4–2	9–10	7–12	11–8	4–3	—	6–1	8–11	2–5	3–3	5–2	4–3	1–6	3–3	9–11
Los Angeles	4–2	4–2	4–3	0–6	4–3	7–12	1–6	—	2–5	4–2	12–7	12–7	3–4	8–11	4–3	11–9
Minnesota	5–2	2–5	12–7	7–12	11–8	1–5	11–8	5–2	—	2–4	3–3	3–4	2–4	4–3	4–3	13–7
New York	12–7	11–8	4–3	2–5	3–3	2–5	5–2	2–4	4–2	—	2–5	5–2	12–7	3–3	9–10	15–5
Oakland	3–4	4–3	5–1	4–3	5–1	7–12	3–3	7–12	3–3	5–2	—	7–12	2–5	10–9	2–5	7–13
Seattle	2–4	3–3	4–3	2–4	6–1	5–14	2–5	7–12	4–3	2–5	12–7	—	5–1	11–8	1–6	12–8
Tampa Bay	11–8	8–11	3–3	3–4	5–2	4–3	3–4	4–3	4–2	7–12	5–2	1–5	—	2–4	9–10	11–9
Texas	1–6	1–5	3–4	1–6	5–1	7–12	6–1	11–8	3–4	3–3	9–10	8–11	4–2	—	3–4	14–6
Toronto	7–12	6–13	3–3	2–4	3–3	3–4	3–3	3–4	3–4	10–9	5–2	6–1	10–9	4–3	—	9–11

=== Game log ===
2017 Game Log: 75–87 (Home: 46–35 Away: 29–52)
April: 11–14 (Home: 7–6; Away: 4–8)

#	Date	Opponent	Score	Win	Loss	Save	Attendance	Record	Streak
1	April 3	Angels	4–2	Graveman (1–0)	Nolasco (0–1)	Casilla (1)	36,067	1–0	W1
2	April 4	Angels	6–7	Bailey (1–0)	Dull (0–1)	Bedrosian (1)	11,225	1–1	L1
3	April 5	Angels	0–5	Ramírez (1–0)	Cotton (0–1)	—	13,405	1–2	L2
4	April 6	Angels	5–1	Triggs (1–0)	Skaggs (0–1)	—	13,292	2–2	W1
5	April 7	@ Rangers	5–10	Claudio (1–0)	Alcántara (0–1)	—	34,235	2–3	L1
6	April 8	@ Rangers	6–1	Graveman (2–0)	Darvish (0–1)	—	44,410	3–3	W1
7	April 9	@ Rangers	1–8	Pérez (1–1)	Manaea (0–1)	—	36,905	3–4	L1
8	April 10	@ Royals	2–0	Cotton (1–1)	Kennedy (0–2)	Doolittle (1)	40,019	4–4	W1
9	April 12	@ Royals	8–3	Triggs (2–0)	Hammel (0–1)	—	24,380	5–4	W2
10	April 13	@ Royals	1–3	Vargas (2–0)	Hahn (0–1)	Herrera (1)	22,160	5–5	L1
11	April 14	Astros	2–7	Keuchel (2–0)	Madson (0–1)	—	15,385	5–6	L2
12	April 15	Astros	6–10	Harris (1–0)	Casilla (0–1)	—	20,140	5–7	L3
—	April 16	Astros	Postponed (rain). Rescheduled to September 9.						
13	April 17	Rangers	0–7	Griffin (2–0)	Cotton (1–2)	—	10,406	5–8	L4
14	April 18	Rangers	4–2	Triggs (3–0)	Darvish (1–2)	Casilla (2)	12,091	6–8	W1
15	April 19	Rangers	9–1	Hahn (1–1)	Pérez (1–2)	—	14,031	7–8	W2
16	April 20	Mariners	9–6	Dull (1–1)	Scribner (0–2)	—	10,707	8–8	W3
17	April 21	Mariners	3–1	Manaea (1–1)	Iwakuma (0–2)	Casilla (3)	15,255	9–8	W4
18	April 22	Mariners	4–3	Cotton (2–2)	Miranda (1–2)	Madson (1)	20,722	10–8	W5
19	April 23	Mariners	1–11	Gallardo (1–2)	Triggs (3–1)	—	24,165	10–9	L1
20	April 25	@ Angels	1–2 (11)	Pounders (1–0)	Madson (0–2)	—	30,124	10–10	L2
21	April 26	@ Angels	5–8	Shoemaker (1–1)	Manaea (1–2)	Norris (3)	30,248	10–11	L3
22	April 27	@ Angels	1–2	Nolasco (2–2)	Graveman (2–1)	Norris (4)	37,603	10–12	L4
23	April 28	@ Astros	4–9	Morton (2–2)	Cotton (2–3)	—	28,472	10–13	L5
24	April 29	@ Astros	2–1	Triggs (4–1)	Musgrove (1–2)	Casilla (4)	32,147	11–13	W1
25	April 30	@ Astros	2–7	Keuchel (5–0)	Hahn (1–2)	Giles (6)	34,880	11–14	L1

May: 12–15 (Home: 8–4; Away: 4–11)

#	Date	Opponent	Score	Win	Loss	Save	Attendance	Record	Streak
26	May 2	@ Twins	1–9	Santana (5–0)	Gray (0–1)	—	18,930	11–15	L1
27	May 3	@ Twins	4–7	Santiago (3–1)	Graveman (2–2)	–	18,658	11–16	L2
28	May 4	@ Twins	8–5	Cotton (3–3)	Gibson (0–4)	Casilla (5)	19,247	12–16	W1
29	May 5	Tigers	2–7	Fulmer (3–1)	Triggs (4–2)	—	17,519	12–17	L1
30	May 6	Tigers	6–5	Montas (1–0)	Rodríguez (1–3)	—	16,651	13–17	W1
31	May 7	Tigers	8–6	Casilla (1–1)	Rodríguez (1–4)	—	23,227	14–17	W2
32	May 8	Angels	3–2	Hendriks (1–0)	Guerra (2–2)	—	10,292	15–17	W3
33	May 9	Angels	3–7	Meyer (1–1)	Cotton (3–4)	Norris (6)	11,383	15–18	L1
34	May 10	Angels	3–1	Triggs (5–2)	Chavez (2–5)	Casilla (6)	11,061	16–18	W1
35	May 12	@ Rangers	2–5	Kela (1–1)	Casilla (1–2)	—	35,625	16–19	L1
36	May 13	@ Rangers	5–6	Barnette (1–0)	Dull (1–2)	Bush (3)	37,898	16–20	L2
37	May 14	@ Rangers	4–6	Álvarez (2–0)	Madson (0–3)	Bush (4)	35,157	16–21	L3
38	May 15	@ Mariners	5–6	Gallardo (2–3)	Manaea (1–3)	Zych (1)	15,431	16–22	L4
39	May 16	@ Mariners	9–6	Madson (1–3)	Cishek (0–1)	—	13,955	17–22	W1
40	May 17	@ Mariners	0–4	Bergman (1–1)	Hahn (1–3)	—	14,117	17–23	L1
41	May 18	Red Sox	8–3	Gray (1–1)	Velázquez (0–1)	—	12,016	18–23	W1
42	May 19	Red Sox	3–2 (10)	Dull (2–2)	Hembree (0–2)	—	24,728	19–23	W2
43	May 20	Red Sox	8–3	Manaea (2–3)	Taylor (0–1)	—	20,235	20–23	W3
44	May 21	Red Sox	3–12	Rodríguez (3–1)	Triggs (5–3)	—	20,691	20–24	L1
45	May 23	Marlins	9–11	Ureña (2–2)	Hahn (1–4)	—	12,835	20–25	L2
46	May 24	Marlins	4–1	Gray (2–1)	Vólquez (0–7)	Casilla (7)	19,738	21–25	W1
47	May 26	@ Yankees	4–1	Manaea (3–3)	Tanaka (5–4)	—	39,044	22–25	W2
48	May 27	@ Yankees	2–3	Sabathia (5–2)	Cotton (3–5)	Betances (5)	40,218	22–26	L1
49	May 28	@ Yankees	5–9	Pineda (6–2)	Triggs (5–4)	Warren (1)	45,232	22–27	L2
50	May 29	@ Indians	3–5	Carrasco (5–2)	Mengden (0–1)	Allen (14)	20,792	22–28	L3
51	May 30	@ Indians	4–9	Bauer (5–4)	Gray (2–2)	—	14,184	22–29	L4
52	May 31	@ Indians	3–1	Manaea (4–3)	Clevinger (2–2)	Casilla (7)	16,784	23–29	W1

June: 12–16 (Home: 7–8; Away: 5–8)

#	Date	Opponent	Score	Win	Loss	Save	Attendance	Record	Streak
53	June 1	@ Indians	0–8	Kluber (4–2)	Cotton (3–6)	—	19,767	23–30	L1
54	June 2	Nationals	3–13	Strasburg (7–1)	Triggs (5–5)	—	20,813	23–31	L2
55	June 3	Nationals	10–4	Hendriks (2–0)	Ross (2–2)	—	23,921	24–31	W1
56	June 4	Nationals	10–11	Roark (6–2)	Madson (1–4)	Kelley (4)	21,265	24–32	L1
57	June 5	Blue Jays	5–3	Manaea (5–3)	Happ (0–4)	Casilla (9)	12,890	25–32	W1
58	June 6	Blue Jays	4–1	Hahn (2–4)	Estrada (4–4)	Casilla (10)	16,643	26–32	W2
59	June 7	Blue Jays	5–7 (10)	Tepera (4–1)	Montas (1–1)	Osuna (14)	15,076	26–33	L1
60	June 9	@ Rays	4–13	Cobb (5–5)	Triggs (5–6)	—	13,153	26–34	L2
61	June 10 (1)	@ Rays	5–6 (10)	Pruitt (5–1)	Hendriks (2–1)	—	17,775	26–35	L3
62	June 10 (2)	@ Rays	7–2	Manaea (6–3)	Hu (0–1)	—	17,775	27–35	W1
63	June 11	@ Rays	4–5	Whitley (2–1)	Coulombe (0–1)	Colomé (18)	13,640	27–36	L1
64	June 13	@ Marlins	1–8	Ureña (5–2)	Cotton (3–7)	—	19,953	27–37	L2
65	June 14	@ Marlins	6–11	Barraclough (2–1)	Gossett (0–1)		19,436	27–38	L3
66	June 15	Yankees	8–7 (10)	Hendriks (3–1)	Gallegos (0–1)	—	21,838	28–38	W1
67	June 16	Yankees	7–6	Coulombe (1–1)	Holder (1–1)	Casilla (11)	30,184	29–38	W2
68	June 17	Yankees	5–2	Hahn (3–4)	Tanaka (5–7)	Doolittle (2)	31,418	30–38	W3
69	June 18	Yankees	4–3	Cotton (4–7)	Cessa (0–1)	Doolittle (3)	34,140	31–38	W4
70	June 19	Astros	1–4	Peacock (4–1)	Gossett (0–2)	Giles (17)	10,482	31–39	L1
71	June 20	Astros	4–8	Martes (2–0)	Gray (2–3)	—	15,362	31–40	L2
72	June 21	Astros	1–5	Fiers (5–2)	Manaea (6–4)	—	12,277	31–41	L3
73	June 22	Astros	9–12	Paulino (2–0)	Hahn (3–5)	Devenski (3)	18,747	31–42	L4
74	June 23	@ White Sox	3–0	Cotton (5–7)	Pelfrey (3–6)	Casilla (12)	25,370	32–42	W1
75	June 24	@ White Sox	10–2	Gossett (1–2)	Shields (1–1)	—	38,618	33–42	W2
76	June 25	@ White Sox	5–3	Gray (3–3)	Kahnle (0–2)	Casilla (13)	28,089	34–42	W3
77	June 27	@ Astros	6–4	Manaea (7–4)	Fiers (5–3)	Casilla (14)	28,312	35–42	W4
78	June 28	@ Astros	8–11	Feliz (4–1)	Hahn (3–6)	Giles (18)	34,075	35–43	L1
79	June 29	@ Astros	1–6	Peacock (5–1)	Gossett (1–3)	—	29,509	35–44	L2
80	June 30	Braves	1–3	Foltynewicz (6–5)	Gray (3–4)	Johnson (17)	19,286	35–45	L3

July: 12–14 (Home: 9–6; Away: 3–8)

#	Date	Opponent	Score	Win	Loss	Save	Attendance	Record	Streak
81	July 1	Braves	3–4	Freeman (1–0)	Casilla (1–3)	Johnson (18)	22,230	35–46	L4
82	July 2	Braves	3–4 (11)	Johnson (6–1)	Axford (0–1)	Vizcaíno (2)	18,438	35–47	L5
83	July 3	White Sox	2–7	Rodon (1–1)	Cotton (5–8)	–	40,019	35–48	L6
84	July 4	White Sox	7–6	Casilla (2–3)	Kahnle (0–3)	—	16,314	36–48	W1
85	July 5	White Sox	7–4	Gray (4–4)	Pelfrey (3–7)	—	13,813	37–48	W2
86	July 6	@ Mariners	7–4	Blackburn (1–0)	Gaviglio (3–4)	—	18,368	38–48	W3
87	July 7	@ Mariners	2–7	Paxton (7–3)	Manaea (7–5)	—	22,213	38–49	L1
88	July 8	@ Mariners	4–3	Doolittle (1–0)	Díaz (2–4)	Casilla (15)	28,694	39–49	W1
89	July 9	@ Mariners	0–4	Hernández (4–3)	Gossett (1–4)	—	32,661	39–50	L1
88th All-Star Game in Miami, Florida
90	July 14	Indians	5–0	Gray (5–4)	Carrasco (10–4)	—	19,870	40–50	W1
91	July 15	Indians	5–3	Madson (2–4)	Miller (3–3)	—	33,021	41–50	W2
92	July 16	Indians	7–3	Manaea (8–5)	Bauer (7–8)	—	25,509	42–50	W3
93	July 17	Rays	2–3	Odorizzi (6–4)	Gossett (1–5)	Colomé (27)	9,736	42–51	L1
94	July 18	Rays	3–4	Kolarek (1–0)	Casilla (2–4)	Colomé (20)	15,231	42–52	L2
95	July 19	Rays	7–2	Gray (6–4)	Faria (4–1)	—	17,019	43–52	W1
96	July 21	@ Mets	5–7	Robles (5–1)	Blackburn (1–1)	Blevins (1)	26,969	43–53	L1
97	July 22	@ Mets	5–6	Robles (6–1)	Castro (0–1)	—	39,629	43–54	L2
98	July 23	@ Mets	3–2	Gossett (2–5)	Montero (1–7)	Casilla (16)	29,037	44–54	W1
99	July 24	@ Blue Jays	2–4	Liriano (6–5)	C. Smith (0–1)	Osuna (25)	39,613	44–55	L1
100	July 25	@ Blue Jays	1–4	Valdez (1–0)	Gray (6–5)	Osuna (26)	40,624	44–56	L2
101	July 26	@ Blue Jays	2–3	Biagini (3–8)	Casilla (2–5)	—	41,984	44–57	L3
102	July 27	@ Blue Jays	4–8 (10)	Osuna (3–0)	Hendriks (3–2)	—	47,484	44–58	L4
103	July 28	Twins	3–6	García (5–7)	Gossett (2–6)	Kintzler (28)	17,727	44–59	L5
104	July 29	Twins	5–4	Coulombe (2–1)	Rogers (5–3)	—	27,047	45–59	W1
105	July 30	Twins	6–5	J. Smith (1–0)	Duffey (0–3)	—	16,790	46–59	W2
106	July 31	Giants	8–5	Blackburn (2–1)	Osich (3–2)	Treinen (1)	38,391	47–59	W3

August: 11–16 (Home: 6–7; Away: 5–9)

#	Date	Opponent	Score	Win	Loss	Save	Attendance	Record	Streak
107	August 1	Giants	4–10	Samardzija (6–11)	Manaea (8–6)	—	38,871	47–60	L1
108	August 2	@ Giants	6–1	Gossett (3–6)	Moore (3–11)	—	40,635	48–60	W1
109	August 3	@ Giants	2–11	Blach (7–7)	Graveman (2–3)	—	39,883	48–61	L1
110	August 4	@ Angels	6–8	Chavez (6–10)	Coulombe (2–2)	Norris (18)	43,330	48–62	L2
111	August 5	@ Angels	5–0	Blackburn (3–1)	Skaggs (1–2)	—	39,180	49–62	W1
112	August 6	@ Angels	11–10	J. Smith (2–0)	Norris (1–5)	Treinen (5)	38,278	50–62	W2
113	August 8	Mariners	6–7 (10)	Rzepczynski (2–0)	J. Smith (2–1)	Díaz (24)	12,354	50–63	L1
114	August 9	Mariners	3–6	Pagan (1–2)	Cotton (5–9)	Diaz (25)	14,989	50–64	L2
115	August 10	Orioles	2–7	Miley (6–9)	C. Smith (0–2)	Britton (10)	11,386	50–65	L3
116	August 11	Orioles	5–4	Casilla (3–5)	Brach (3–3)	Treinen (6)	14,330	51–65	W1
117	August 12	Orioles	5–12	Bundy (12–8)	Manaea (8–7)	—	29,742	51–66	L1
118	August 13	Orioles	9–3	Graveman (3–3)	Hellickson (7–7)	—	18,912	52–66	W1
119	August 14	Royals	2–6	Junis (5–2)	Cotton (5–10)	—	9,848	52–67	L1
120	August 15	Royals	10–8	Treinen (1–2)	Minor (5–5)	—	13,875	53–67	W1
121	August 16	Royals	6–7	Maurer (2–5)	Treinen (1–3)	Herrera (26)	15,239	53–68	L1
122	August 18	@ Astros	1–3	Keuchel (11–2)	Manaea (8–8)	Giles (24)	30,908	53–69	L2
123	August 19	@ Astros	0–3	McHugh (1–2)	Graveman (3–4)	Clippard (4)	32,796	53–70	L3
124	August 20	@ Astros	3–2	Cotton (6–10)	Peacock (10–2)	Treinen (7)	34,011	54–70	W1
125	August 21	@ Orioles	3–7	Miley (7–10)	C. Smith (0–3)	Britton (11)	16,020	54–71	L1
126	August 22	@ Orioles	6–4	Castro (1–1)	Jiménez (5–9)	Treinen (8)	18,493	55–71	W1
127	August 23	@ Orioles	7–8 (12)	Castro (3–1)	Castro (1–2)	—	20,072	55–72	L1
128	August 25	Rangers	3–1	Graveman (4–4)	Martinez (3–5)	Treinen (9)	14,499	56–72	W1
129	August 26	Rangers	8–3	Manaea (9–8)	Hamels (9–2)	—	22,471	57–72	W2
130	August 27	Rangers	8–3	Cotton (7–10)	Griffin (3–7)	Treinen (10)	16,335	58–72	W3
131	August 28	@ Angels	1–3	Heaney (1–0)	Gossett (3–7)	Parker (3)	33,719	58–73	L1
132	August 29	@ Angels	2–8	Chavez (7–10)	C. Smith (0–4)	—	36,229	58–74	L2
133	August 30	@ Angels	8–10	Bedrosian (4–3)	Hatcher (0–2)	Parker (4)	36,022	58–75	L3

September/October: 17–12 (Home: 9–4; Away: 8–8)

#	Date	Opponent	Score	Win	Loss	Save	Attendance	Record	Streak
134	September 1	@ Mariners	2–3	Leake (8–12)	Manaea (9–9)	Díaz (31)	19,030	58–76	L4
135	September 2	@ Mariners	6–7	Díaz (3–5)	Treinen (1–4)	—	22,245	58–77	L5
136	September 3	@ Mariners	2–10	Albers (3–1)	Gossett (3–8)	—	26,898	58–78	L6
137	September 4	Angels	9–11 (11)	Salas (2–2)	Treinen (1–5)	Middleton (3)	14,571	58–79	L7
138	September 5	Angels	7–8 (10)	Bedrosian (5–4)	Treinen (1–6)	Paredes (1)	11,110	58–80	L8
139	September 6	Angels	3–1	Manaea (10–9)	Skaggs (1–5)	Hatcher (1)	10,544	59–80	W1
140	September 8	Astros	9–8	Treinen (2–6)	Giles (1–3)	—	12,288	60–80	W2
141	September 9 (1)	Astros	11–1	Gossett (4–8)	Morton (11–7)	—		61–80	W3
142	September 9 (2)	Astros	11–4	Hatcher (1–2)	Devenski (8–4)	—	19,244	62–80	W4
143	September 10	Astros	10–2	Graveman (5–4)	Keuchel (12–4)	—	15,892	63–80	W5
144	September 12	@ Red Sox	1–11	Rodríguez (5–5)	Manaea (10–10)	—	34,355	63–81	L1
145	September 13	@ Red Sox	7–3	Cotton (8–10)	Fister (5–8)	—	36,366	64–81	W1
146	September 14	@ Red Sox	2–6	Pomeranz (16–5)	Gossett (4–9)	—	35,470	64–82	L1
147	September 15	@ Phillies	4–0	Mengden (1–1)	Leiter (3–6)	—	24,061	65–82	W1
148	September 16	@ Phillies	3–5	Arano (1–0)	Castro (1–3)	Neris (21)	24,290	65–83	L1
149	September 17	@ Phillies	6–3	Manaea (11–10)	Álvarez (0–1)	Treinen (11)	28,054	66–83	W1
150	September 18	@ Tigers	8–3	Hendriks (4–2)	Farmer (4–4)	—	23,895	67–83	W2
151	September 19	@ Tigers	9–8	Casilla (4–5)	Wilson (2–5)	Treinen (12)	23,460	68–83	W3
152	September 20	@ Tigers	3–2	Mengden (2–1)	Sánchez (3–5)	Hendriks (1)	26,913	69–83	W4
153	September 22	Rangers	4–1	Graveman (6–4)	Martinez (3–7)	Treinen (13)	13,848	70–83	W5
154	September 23	Rangers	1–0	Alcántara (1–1)	González (8–12)	Treinen (14)	38,034	71–83	W6
155	September 24	Rangers	8–1	Cotton (9–10)	Pérez (12–12)	—	18,601	72–83	W7
156	September 25	Mariners	1–7	Hernández (6–5)	Gossett (4–10)	Albers (1)	9,329	72–84	L1
157	September 26	Mariners	3–6	Pagan (2–3)	Mengden (2–2)	Díaz (33)	13,513	72–85	L2
158	September 27	Mariners	6–5	Treinen (3–6)	Simmons (0–1)	—	13,132	73–85	W1
159	September 28	@ Rangers	4–1	Manaea (12–10)	González (8–13)	Treinen (15)	41,664	74–85	W2
160	September 29	@ Rangers	3–5	Perez (13–12)	Alcántara (1–2)	Claudio (11)	28,459	74–86	L1
161	September 30	@ Rangers	4–8	Cashner (11–11)	Gossett (4–11)	—	32,759	74–87	L2
162	October 1	@ Rangers	5–2	Mengden (3–2)	Hamels (11–6)	Treinen (16)	33,961	75–87	W1

== Roster ==
2017 Oakland Athletics
Roster
Pitchers: 50 Raúl Alcántara; 61 John Axford; 58 Paul Blackburn; 64 Michael Brady; 46 Santiago Casilla; 67 Simón Castro; 45 Jharel Cotton; 35 Daniel Coulombe; 62 Sean Doolittle; 66 Ryan Dull; 48 Daniel Gossett; 49 Kendall Graveman; 54 Sonny Gray; 32 Jesse Hahn; 44 Chris Hatcher; 31 Liam Hendriks; 44 Ryan Madson; 55 Sean Manaea; 33 Daniel Mengden; 62 Sam Moll; 47 Frankie Montas; 36 Zach Neal; 56 Chris Smith; 57 Josh Smith; 39 Blake Treinen; 60 Andrew Triggs; 64 César Valdez; 63 Bobby Wahl	Catchers: 12 Dustin Garneau; 30 Ryan Lavarnway; 13 Bruce Maxwell; 19 Josh Phegley; 21 Stephen Vogt; Infielders: 17 Yonder Alonso; 1 Franklin Barreto; 26 Matt Chapman; 25 Ryon Healy; 8 Jed Lowrie; 26,28 Matt Olson; 18 Chad Pinder; 3 Trevor Plouffe; 16 Adam Rosales; 10 Marcus Semien; 52 Joey Wendle	Outfielders: 38 Jaycob Brugman; 20 Mark Canha; 37 Jaff Decker; 2 Khris Davis; 11 Rajai Davis; 23 Matthew Joyce; 39 Ryan LaMarre; 22 Renato Núñez; 3 Boog Powell; 5 Jake Smolinski	Manager: 6 Bob Melvin; Coaches: 14 Mike Aldrete (first base); 41 Garvin Alston (bullpen); 51 Darren Bush (hitting); 90 Jeremy Dowdy (bullpen catcher); 65 Scott Emerson (pitching); 4 Chip Hale (acting bench); 59 Marcus Jensen (assistant hitting/catching); 7 Mark Kotsay (bench); 88 Philip Pohl (bullpen catcher); 15 Steve Scarsone (acting third base)

== Player stats ==
=== Batting ===
Note: G = Games played; AB = At bats; R = Runs; H = Hits; 2B = Doubles; 3B = Triples; HR = Home runs; RBI = Runs batted in; SB = Stolen bases; BB = Walks; AVG = Batting average; SLG = Slugging average

Player	G	AB	R	H	2B	3B	HR	RBI	SB	BB	AVG	SLG
Ryon Healy	149	576	66	156	29	0	25	78	0	23	.271	.451
Jed Lowrie	153	567	86	157	49	3	14	69	0	73	.277	.448
Khris Davis	153	566	91	140	28	1	43	110	4	73	.247	.528
Matt Joyce	141	469	78	114	33	0	25	68	4	66	.243	.473
Marcus Semien	85	342	53	85	19	1	10	40	12	38	.249	.398
Yonder Alonso	100	319	52	85	17	0	22	49	1	50	.266	.527
Rajai Davis	100	300	49	70	17	2	5	18	26	26	.233	.353
Matt Chapman	84	290	39	68	23	2	14	40	0	32	.234	.472
Chad Pinder	87	282	36	67	15	1	15	42	2	18	.238	.457
Bruce Maxwell	76	219	21	52	12	0	3	22	0	31	.237	.333
Adam Rosales	71	205	15	48	11	0	4	27	1	10	.234	.346
Matt Olson	59	189	33	49	2	0	24	45	0	22	.259	.651
Trevor Plouffe	58	182	22	39	5	0	7	14	1	16	.214	.357
Mark Canha	57	173	16	36	13	1	5	14	2	7	.208	.382
Stephen Vogt	54	157	12	34	8	1	4	20	0	16	.217	.357
Josh Phegley	57	149	14	30	11	0	3	10	0	9	.201	.336
Jaycob Brugman	48	143	12	38	2	0	3	12	1	18	.266	.343
Boog Powell	29	81	18	26	5	0	3	10	0	9	.321	.494
Franklin Barreto	25	71	10	14	1	2	2	6	2	5	.197	.352
Jaff Decker	17	50	4	10	1	1	0	1	1	8	.200	.260
Dustin Garneau	19	44	5	7	1	0	1	3	0	8	.159	.250
Jake Smolinski	16	27	1	7	1	0	0	0	0	1	.259	.296
Renato Núñez	8	15	1	3	0	0	1	3	0	1	.200	.400
Joey Wendle	8	13	3	4	1	0	1	5	0	1	.308	.615
Ryan Lavarnway	6	11	0	3	1	0	0	2	0	1	.273	.364
Ryan LaMarre	3	7	0	0	0	0	0	0	0	1	.000	.000
Pitcher totals	162	17	2	2	0	0	0	0	0	2	.118	.118
Team totals	162	5464	739	1344	305	15	234	708	57	565	.246	.436

=== Pitching ===
Note: W = Wins; L = Losses; ERA = Earned run average; G = Games pitched; GS = Games started; SV = Saves; IP = Innings pitched; H = Hits allowed; R = Runs allowed; ER = Earned runs allowed; BB = Walks allowed; SO = Strikeouts

Player	W	L	ERA	G	GS	SV	IP	H	R	ER	BB	SO
Sean Manaea	12	10	4.37	29	29	0	158.2	167	88	77	55	140
Jharel Cotton	9	10	5.58	24	24	0	129.0	133	91	80	53	105
Kendall Graveman	6	4	4.19	19	19	0	105.0	114	50	49	32	70
Sonny Gray	6	5	3.43	16	16	0	97.0	84	48	37	30	94
Daniel Gossett	4	11	6.11	18	18	0	91.1	116	67	62	31	72
Jesse Hahn	3	6	5.30	14	13	0	69.2	78	46	41	27	55
Andrew Triggs	5	6	4.27	12	12	0	65.1	68	42	31	19	50
Liam Hendriks	4	2	4.22	70	0	1	64.0	57	34	30	23	78
Santiago Casilla	4	5	4.27	63	0	16	59.0	58	29	28	22	57
Paul Blackburn	3	1	3.22	10	10	0	58.2	58	22	21	16	22
Chris Smith	0	4	6.79	14	9	0	55.2	60	45	42	22	31
Danny Coulombe	2	2	3.48	72	0	0	51.2	46	22	20	22	39
Daniel Mengden	3	2	3.14	7	7	0	43.0	36	16	15	9	29
Ryan Dull	2	2	5.14	49	0	0	42.0	37	30	24	16	45
Ryan Madson	2	4	2.06	40	0	1	39.1	25	9	9	6	39
Blake Treinen	3	4	2.13	35	0	13	38.0	32	11	9	12	42
Simón Castro	1	3	4.38	26	0	0	37.0	32	20	18	14	35
Josh Smith	2	1	4.89	26	0	0	35.0	35	20	19	15	25
Frankie Montas	1	1	7.03	23	0	0	32.0	39	25	25	20	36
Michael Brady	0	0	5.68	16	0	0	31.2	33	22	20	6	24
Raúl Alcántara	1	2	7.13	8	4	0	24.0	22	21	19	12	12
Chris Hatcher	1	1	3.52	23	0	1	23.0	21	9	9	9	20
Sean Doolittle	1	0	3.38	23	0	3	21.1	12	8	8	2	31
John Axford	0	1	6.43	22	0	0	21.0	27	16	15	17	21
Zach Neal	0	0	7.98	6	0	0	14.2	19	13	13	1	10
César Valdez	0	0	9.64	4	1	0	9.1	14	10	10	4	5
Bobby Wahl	0	0	4.70	7	0	0	7.2	8	4	4	4	8
Sam Moll	0	0	10.80	11	0	0	6.2	13	8	8	3	7
Team totals	75	87	4.67	162	162	35	1431.0	1444	826	743	502	1202

== Farm system ==
Level	Team	League	Manager
AAA	Nashville Sounds	Pacific Coast League	Ryan Christenson
AA	Midland RockHounds	Texas League	Fran Riordan
A-Advanced	Stockton Ports	California League	Rick Magnante
A	Beloit Snappers	Midwest League	Scott Steinmann
A-Short Season	Vermont Lake Monsters	New York–Penn League	Aaron Nieckula
Rookie	AZL Athletics	Arizona League	Webster Garrison
Rookie	DSL Athletics	Dominican Summer League	
