= 2017 Miami Marlins season =

2017 Miami Marlins
- League: National League
- Division: East
- Ballpark: Marlins Park
- City: Miami, Florida
- Record: 77–85 (.475)
- Divisional place: 2nd
- Owners: Jeffrey Loria
- President of baseball operations: Michael Hill
- General managers: Michael Hill
- Managers: Don Mattingly
- Television: Fox Sports Florida; Sun Sports (English: Rich Waltz, Preston Wilson, Todd Hollandsworth, Jeff Conine) (Spanish: Raul Striker Jr., Cookie Rojas)
- Radio: Miami Marlins Radio Network (English) (Dave Van Horne, Glenn Geffner); WAQI (Spanish) (Felo Ramírez, Luis Quintana)

The 2017 Miami Marlins season was the 25th season for the Major League Baseball (MLB) Marlins franchise, all in the National League, and the sixth as the "Miami" Marlins. The Marlins played their home games at Marlins Park and hosted the 2017 MLB All-Star Game. The Marlins were managed by Don Mattingly in his second season as manager of the team. They finished the season 77–85 to finish in second place, 20 games behind the Washington Nationals, in the National League East. They failed to make the playoffs for the 14th consecutive season.

The season marked the last season under Jeffrey Loria's ownership of the team as Loria agreed to sell the team to a group led by Derek Jeter for $1.2 billion.

== Regular season ==
On June 3, Edinson Vólquez threw his first career no-hitter and the sixth in Marlins history, defeating the Arizona Diamondbacks, 3–0, at Marlins Park. Vólquez threw 98 pitches, struck out 10 and walked two batters (both of whom were both erased on double plays), facing the minimum number of batters. On June 14, outfielder Ichiro Suzuki singled for his 365th interleague hit, passing Derek Jeter to becoming the all-time leader in interleague hits.

On June 25, Suzuki became the oldest player to start a game in center field since at least 1900, breaking the record previously held by Rickey Henderson. Suzuki singled twice on July 6 against the St. Louis Cardinals, bringing his hits total to 3,054 and surpassing Panamanian-born Rod Carew as the all-time leader in MLB hits among foreign-born players.

The Marlins hosted the 2017 MLB All-Star Game at Marlins Park. Right fielder Giancarlo Stanton (fourth time) and left fielder Marcell Ozuna (second) were selected to the National League team. At the time, Stanton led the NL with 26 home runs and batted .277/.360/.572.

The Marlins' 22–10 win over the Texas Rangers on July 26 set a new franchise record for the most runs scored in a single game.

While playing the San Francisco Giants on August 14, Stanton hit his 43rd home run, setting the Marlins franchise record for most home runs in a season, which passed Gary Sheffield's mark of 42 set in 1996. Stanton hit the home run versus Ty Blach and had homered in five consecutive games, setting another franchise record. In a duration of 35 games through August 15, Stanton advanced in a historic run, producing 23 home runs, including in six games in a row. Only Sammy Sosa (1998) and Barry Bonds (2001) had ever hit more in a 35-game span.

On August 26, Suzuki set the Marlins' single-season franchise record for pinch-hits with his 22nd pinch hit. On August 27, Stanton became the first player since Chris Davis in 2013 to hit 50 home runs in one season. Stanton also became the sixth player in history to reach 50 home runs before the end of August. In the August 29 game versus the Washington Nationals, he hit his 18th home run of the month, tying Rudy York for his record of home runs in August set in 1937.

Stanton won the NL Player of the Month Award for August, leading the major leagues with 18 home runs, 37 RBI, 28 runs scored and .899 slugging percentage.

On September 8, Suzuki became the sixth player all-time to hit 2,500 career singles, as well as the eighth right fielder of all-time to record over 4,000 putouts at the position. Stanton hit his 57th home run and drove in four runs on September 23 versus Arizona, giving him 125 on the season, and passing Preston Wilson's franchise record of 121 set in 2000. In spite of Stanton's historic season, ESPN ranked Marlins Park as one of the six most difficult stadiums in which to hit a home run in 2017.

=== Season standings ===
==== National League East ====
NL East
Team	W	L	Pct.	GB	Home	Road
Washington Nationals	97	65	.599	—	47‍–‍34	50‍–‍31
Miami Marlins	77	85	.475	20	42‍–‍36	35‍–‍49
Atlanta Braves	72	90	.444	25	37‍–‍44	35‍–‍46
New York Mets	70	92	.432	27	37‍–‍44	33‍–‍48
Philadelphia Phillies	66	96	.407	31	39‍–‍42	27‍–‍54

==== National League Wild Card ====
Division leaders
Team	W	L	Pct.
Los Angeles Dodgers	104	58	.642
Washington Nationals	97	65	.599
Chicago Cubs	92	70	.568

Wild Card teams (Top 2 teams qualify for postseason)
Team	W	L	Pct.	GB
Arizona Diamondbacks	93	69	.574	+6
Colorado Rockies	87	75	.537	—
Milwaukee Brewers	86	76	.531	1
St. Louis Cardinals	83	79	.512	4
Miami Marlins	77	85	.475	10
Pittsburgh Pirates	75	87	.463	12
Atlanta Braves	72	90	.444	15
San Diego Padres	71	91	.438	16
New York Mets	70	92	.432	17
Cincinnati Reds	68	94	.420	19
Philadelphia Phillies	66	96	.407	21
San Francisco Giants	64	98	.395	23

==== Record vs. opponents ====
2017 National League record Source: MLB Standings Grid – 2017
Team	AZ	ATL	CHC	CIN	COL	LAD	MIA	MIL	NYM	PHI	PIT	SD	SF	STL	WSH	AL
Arizona	—	2–4	3–3	3–3	11–8	11–8	3–4	4–3	6–1	6–1	4–3	11–8	12–7	3–4	2–4	12–8
Atlanta	4–2	—	1–6	3–3	3–4	3–4	11–8	4–2	7–12	6–13	2–5	5–2	4–3	1–5	9–10	9–11
Chicago	3–3	6–1	—	12–7	2–5	2–4	4–3	10–9	4–2	4–3	10–9	2–4	4–3	14–5	3–4	12–8
Cincinnati	3–3	3–3	7–12	—	3–4	0–6	2–5	8–11	3–4	4–2	13–6	3–4	4–3	9–10	1–6	5–15
Colorado	8–11	4–3	5–2	4–3	—	10–9	2–4	4–3	3–3	5–2	3–3	12–7	12–7	2–4	3–4	10–10
Los Angeles	8–11	4–3	4–2	6–0	9–10	—	6–1	3–3	7–0	4–3	6–1	13–6	11–8	4–3	3–3	16–4
Miami	4–3	8–11	3–4	5–2	4–2	1–6	—	2–4	12–7	8–11	3–4	5–1	5–1	2–5	6–13	9–11
Milwaukee	3–4	2–4	9–10	11–8	3–4	3–3	4–2	—	5–2	3–3	9–10	5–2	3–4	11–8	4–3	11–9
New York	1–6	12–7	2–4	4–3	3–3	0–7	7–12	2–5	—	12–7	3–3	3–4	5–1	3–4	6–13	7–13
Philadelphia	1–6	13–6	3–4	2–4	2–5	3–4	11–8	3–3	7–12	—	2–5	1–5	4–3	1–5	8–11	5–15
Pittsburgh	3–4	5–2	9–10	6–13	3–3	1–6	4–3	10–9	3–3	5–2	—	3–3	1–5	8–11	4–3	10–10
San Diego	8–11	2–5	4–2	4–3	7–12	6–13	1–5	2–5	4–3	5–1	3–3	—	12–7	3–4	2–5	8–12
San Francisco	7–12	3–4	3–4	3–4	7–12	8–11	1–5	4–3	1–5	3–4	5–1	7–12	—	3–4	1–5	8–12
St. Louis	4–3	5–1	5–14	10–9	4–2	3–4	5–2	8–11	4–3	5–1	11–8	4–3	4–3	—	3–3	8–12
Washington	4–2	10–9	4–3	6–1	4–3	3–3	13–6	3–4	13–6	11–8	3–4	5–2	5–1	3–3	—	10–10

=== Game log ===
2017 regular season game log: 77–85 (Home: 43–38; Away: 34–47)
April: 11–12 (Home: 5–4; Away: 6–8)

#	Date	Opponent	Score	Win	Loss	Save	Attendance	Record	Streak
1	April 3	@ Nationals	2–4	Strasburg (1–0)	**Phelps** (0–1)	Treinen (1)	42,744	0–1	L1
2	April 5	@ Nationals	4–6	Roark (1–0)	**Straily** (0–1)	Treinen (2)	22,715	0–2	L2
3	April 6	@ Nationals	4–3 (10)	**Phelps** (1–1)	Blanton (0–1)	**Ramos** (1)	19,418	1–2	W1
4	April 7	@ Mets	7–2	**Chen** (1–0)	Wheeler (0–1)	—	27,891	2–2	W2
5	April 8	@ Mets	8–1	**Conley** (1–0)	Gsellman (0–1)	—	33,936	3–2	W3
6	April 9	@ Mets	2–5	Syndergaard (1–0)	**Vólquez** (0–1)	Reed (1)	27,420	3–3	L1
7	April 11	Braves	8–4	**Straily** (1–1)	Colón (0–1)	—	36,519	4–3	W1
8	April 12	Braves	4–5	Vizcaíno (1–0)	**Ramos** (0–1)	Johnson (1)	16,808	4–4	L1
9	April 13	Mets	8–9 (16)	Robles (2–0)	**Conley** (1–1)	—	23,192	4–5	L2
10	April 14	Mets	3–2	**Ramos** (1–1)	Edgin (0–1)	—	24,194	5–5	W1
11	April 15	Mets	5–4	**Tazawa** (1–0)	Salas (0–1)	**Ramos** (2)	25,137	6–5	W2
12	April 16	Mets	4–2	**Phelps** (2–1)	Reed (0–1)	—	20,058	7–5	W3
13	April 17	@ Mariners	1–6	Miranda (1–1)	**Koehler** (0–1)	—	16,990	7–6	L1
14	April 18	@ Mariners	5–0	**Chen** (2–0)	Gallardo (0–2)	—	16,126	8–6	W1
15	April 19	@ Mariners	5–10	**Hernandez** (2–1)	Volquez (0–1)	—	27,147	8–7	L1
16	April 21	@ Padres	3–5	**Cahill** (1–2)	Phelps (2–2)	—	30,413	8-8	L2
17	April 22	@ Padres	6–3 (11)	Ziegler (1–0)	Torres (1–1)	**Ramos** (3)	39,313	9-8	W1
18	April 23	@ Padres	7–3	Koehler (1-1)	Stammen (0-1)	—	26,070	10-8	W2
–	April 25	@ Phillies	Postponed (rain); Rescheduled for August 22 as part of a doubleheader.						
19	April 26	@ Phillies	4–7	Velasquez (1–2)	**Chen** (2–1)	—	26,191	10–9	L1
20	April 27	@ Phillies	2–3	Hellickson (4–0)	**Vólquez** (0–3)	Neris (3)	22,180	10–10	L2
21	April 28	Pirates	2–12	Tallion (2-0)	**Conley** (1-2)	—	19,690	10–11	L3
22	April 29	Pirates	0–4	Nova (3–2)	**Straily** (1–2)	—	33,619	10–12	L4
23	April 30	Pirates	10–3	**McGowan** (1–0)	Williams (1–1)	—	26,245	11-12	W1

May: 10–18 (Home: 6–11; Away: 4–7)

#	Date	Opponent	Score	Win	Loss	Save	Attendance	Record	Streak
24	May 1	Rays	2–4	Farquhar (1–1)	**Ziegler** (1–1)	Colomé (6)	16,096	11–13	L1
25	May 2	Rays	1–3	Cobb (2–2)	**Vólquez** (0–4)	Colomé (7)	16,011	11–14	L2
26	May 3	@ Rays	10–5	**Conley** (2–2)	Pruitt (3–1)	—	12,285	12–14	W1
27	May 4	@ Rays	1–5	Andriese (2–1)	**Straily** (1–3)	—	10,118	12–15	L1
28	May 5	@ Mets	7–8	Blevins (2–0)	**Ziegler** (1–2)	Familia (3)	25,618	12–16	L2
29	May 6	@ Mets	3–11	Gsellman (2–2)	**Despaigne** (0–1)	—	33,339	12–17	L3
30	May 7	@ Mets	7–0	**Ureña** (1–0)	Wilk (0–1)	—	39,197	13–17	W1
31	May 8	Cardinals	4–9	Martinez (2–3)	**Conley** (2–3)	Socolovich (1)	16,750	13–18	L1
32	May 9	Cardinals	5–6	Rosenthal (1–1)	**Ramos** (1–2)	Oh (8)	17,166	13–19	L2
33	May 10	Cardinals	5–7	Tuivailala (2–0)	**Garcia** (0–1)	Oh (9)	18,614	13–20	L3
34	May 12	Braves	4–8	Foltynewicz (1–4)	**Ureña** (1–1)	—	20,052	13–21	L4
35	May 13	Braves	1–3	Teherán (3–3)	**Vólquez** (0–5)	Johnson (6)	26,692	13–22	L5
36	May 14	Braves	3–1	**Barraclough** (1–0)	Dickey (3–3)	**Ramos** (4)	17,277	14–22	W1
37	May 15	Astros	2–7	Musgrove (3–3)	**Tazawa** (1–1)	—	16,448	14–23	L1
38	May 16	Astros	2–12	Keuchel (7–0)	**Koehler** (1–2)	—	18,056	14–24	L2
39	May 17	Astros	0–3	McCullers Jr (4–1)	**Ureña** (1–2)	Giles (11)	24,669	14–25	L3
40	May 18	@ Dodgers	2–7	Ryu (2–5)	**Vólquez** (0–6)	Jansen (8)	41,717	14–26	L4
41	May 19	@ Dodgers	2–7	Wood (5–0)	**Nicolino** (0–1)	—	45,034	14–27	L5
42	May 20	@ Dodgers	10–6	**Straily** (2–3)	Urias (0–2)	—	52,850	15–27	W1
43	May 21	@ Dodgers	3–6	McCarthy (4–1)	**Worley** (0–1)	—	44,646	15–28	L1
44	May 23	@ Athletics	11–9	**Ureña** (2–2)	Hahn (1–4)	—	12,835	16–28	W1
45	May 24	@ Athletics	1–4	Gray (2–1)	**Vólquez** (0–7)	Casilla (7)	19,738	16–29	L1
46	May 26	Angels	8–5	**Straily** (3–3)	Chavez (4–6)	**Ramos** (5)	18,341	17–29	W1
47	May 27	Angels	2–5	Ramirez (5–2)	**Worley** (0–2)	—	19,366	17–30	L1
48	May 28	Angels	9–2	**Ureña** (3–2)	Shoemaker (4–3)	—	20,044	18–30	W1
49	May 29	Phillies	4–1	**Vólquez** (1–7)	Hellickson (5–3)	**Ramos** (6)	17,032	19–30	W2
50	May 30	Phillies	7–2	**McGowan** (2–0)	Velasquez (2–5)	—	16,341	20–30	W3
51	May 31	Phillies	10–2	**Straily** (4–3)	Nola (2–3)	—	15,197	21–30	W4

June: 14–13 (Home: 10–5; Away: 4–7)

#	Date	Opponent	Score	Win	Loss	Save	Attendance	Record	Streak
52	June 1	D-Backs	2–3	Greinke (7–3)	**Barraclough** (1–1)	Rodney (14)	16,433	21–31	L1
53	June 2	D-Backs	7–5	**McGowan** (3–0)	Corbin (4–6)	**Ramos** (7)	17,413	22–31	W1
54	June 3	D-Backs	3–0	**Vólquez** (2–7)	Delgado (1–1)	—	21,548	23–31	W2
55	June 4	D-Backs	6–5	**Wittgren** (1–0)	De La Rosa (2–1)	**Ramos** (8)	20,387	24–31	W3
56	June 5	@ Cubs	1–3	Butler (3–1)	**Straily** (4–4)	Montgomery (2)	34,037	24–32	L1
57	June 6	@ Cubs	2–10	Arrieta (6–4)	**Locke** (0–1)	—	34,082	24–33	L2
58	June 7	@ Cubs	6–5	**Ureña** (4–2)	Lackey (4–6)	**Ramos** (9)	37,294	25–33	W1
59	June 8	@ Pirates	7–1	**Vólquez** (3–7)	Cole (3–6)	—	21,744	26–33	W2
60	June 9	@ Pirates	12–7	**McGowan** (4–0)	Glansow (2–6)	—	23,950	27–33	W3
61	June 10	@ Pirates	6–7	Hudson (1–2)	**Phelps** (2–3)	Rivero (1)	27,275	27–34	L1
62	June 11	@ Pirates	1–3	Nova (6–4)	**Locke** (0–2)	Rivero (2)	22,925	27–35	L2
63	June 13	Athletics	8–1	**Ureña** (5–2)	Cotton (3–7)	—	19,953	28–35	W1
64	June 14	Athletics	11–6	**Barraclough** (2-1)	Gossett (0–1)	—	19,436	29–35	W2
65	June 16	@ Braves	5–0	**Straily** (5–4)	Newcomb (0–2)	—	38,123	30–35	W3
66	June 17	@ Braves	7–8 (10)	Vizcaino (3–2)	**Ramos** (1–3)	—	38,661	30–36	L1
67	June 18	@ Braves	4–5	Johnson (5–1)	**Steckenrider** (0–1)	—	36,912	30–37	L2
68	June 19	Nationals	8–7	**Ramos** (2–3)	Romero (2–3)	—	20,224	31–37	W1
69	June 20	Nationals	3–12	González (7–1)	**Vólquez** (3–8)	—	20,868	31–38	L1
70	June 21	Nationals	2–1	**Barraclough** (3–1)	Scherzer (8–5)	**Ramos** (10)	22,659	32–38	W1
71	June 22	Cubs	1–11	Arrieta (7–5)	**Locke** (0–3)	—	23,472	32–39	L1
72	June 23	Cubs	2–0	**Ureña** (6–2)	Lackey (5–8)	**Ramos** (11)	24,684	33–39	W1
73	June 24	Cubs	3–5	Lester (5–4)	**Wittgren** (1–1)	Davis (15)	25,448	33–40	L1
74	June 25	Cubs	4–2	**Vólquez** (4–8)	Montgomery (1–4)	**Ramos** (12)	25,110	34–40	W1
75	June 27	Mets	6–3	**Barraclough** (4–1)	Ramirez (0–1)	**Ramos** (13)	20,804	35–40	W2
76	June 28	Mets	0–8	Matz (2-1)	**Locke** (0–4)	—	18,743	35–41	L1
77	June 29	Mets	3–6	Lugo (3–1)	**Ureña** (6–3)	Reed (12)	21,350	35–42	L2
78	June 30	@ Brewers	2–3	Torres (4–4)	**Phelps** (2–4)	Knabel (13)	35,549	35–43	L3

July: 14–12 (Home: 4–7; Away: 10–5)

#	Date	Opponent	Score	Win	Loss	Save	Attendance	Record	Streak
79	July 1	@ Brewers	4–8	Davies (9–4)	**Koehler** (1–3)	—	30,712	35–44	L4
80	July 2	@ Brewers	10–3	**Straily** (6–4)	Guerra (1–3)	—	33,384	36–44	W1
81	July 3	@ Cardinals	6–14	Wainwright (9–5)	**Locke** (0–5)	—	42,695	36–45	L1
82	July 4	@ Cardinals	5–2	**Ureña** (7–3)	Lynn (6–6)	**Ramos** (14)	38,497	37–45	W1
83	July 5	@ Cardinals	9–6	**McGowan** (5–0)	Leake (6–7)	**Ramos** (15)	40,204	38–45	W2
84	July 6	@ Cardinals	3–4	Wacha (6–3)	**Koehler** (1–4)	Oh (17)	37,780	38–46	L1
85	July 7	@ Giants	6–1	**Straily** (7–4)	Moore (3–9)	—	41,510	39–46	W1
86	July 8	@ Giants	5–4	**O'Grady** (1–0)	Samardzija (4–10)	**Ramos** (16)	41,480	40–46	W2
87	July 9	@ Giants	10–8 (11)	**Wittgren** (2–1)	Kontos (0–3)	**Ramos** (17)	41,516	41–46	W3
**88th All-Star Game in Miami, Florida**
88	July 14	Dodgers	4–6	Fields (5–0)	**Ramos** (2–4)	Jansen (22)	21,858	41–47	L1
89	July 15	Dodgers	1–7	Wood (11–0)	**Ureña** (7–4)	—	22,609	41–48	L2
90	July 16	Dodgers	2–3	Hill (6–4)	**O'Grady** (1–1)	Jansen (23)	22,119	41–49	L3
91	July 17	Phillies	6–5 (10)	**Steckenrider** (1–1)	Leiter Jr. (1–2)	—	17,146	42–49	W1
92	July 18	Phillies	2–5	Neshek (3–2)	**McGowan** (5–1)	Neris (9)	18,176	42–50	L1
93	July 19	Phillies	3–10	Pivetta (3–5)	**Straily** (7–5)	—	31,854	42–51	L2
94	July 21	@ Reds	3–1	**Ureña** (8–4)	Bailey (2–4)	**Ramos** (18)	21,851	43–51	W1
95	July 22	@ Reds	5–4	**Wittgren** (3–1)	Stephenson (0–3)	**Ramos** (19)	24,099	44–51	W2
96	July 23	@ Reds	3–6	Romano (2–2)	**Koehler** (1–5)	Igiesias (17)	20,526	44–52	L1
97	July 24	@ Rangers	4–0	**Conley** (3–3)	Perez (5–8)	—	24,654	45–52	W1
98	July 25	@ Rangers	4–10	Hamels (5–1)	**Straily** (7–6)	—	25,074	45–53	L1
99	July 26	@ Rangers	22–10	**Ureña** (9–4)	Darvish (6–9)	—	26,471	46–53	W1
100	July 27	Reds	4–1	**O'Grady** (2–1)	Stephenson (0–4)	**Ramos** (20)	19,986	47–53	W2
101	July 28	Reds	7–4	**McGowan** (6–1)	Peralta (3–2)	—	17,440	48–53	W3
102	July 29	Reds	7–3	**Conley** (4–3)	Adleman (5–9)	—	20,297	49–53	W4
103	July 30	Reds	4–6	Castillo (2–4)	**Straily** (7–7)	—	19,947	49–54	L1
104	July 31	Nationals	0–1	Gonzalez (9–5)	**Ureña** (9–5)	Doolittle (7)	18,962	49–55	L2

August: 17–12 (Home: 10–2; Away: 7–10)

#	Date	Opponent	Score	Win	Loss	Save	Attendance	Record	Streak
105	August 1	Nationals	7–6	**McGowan** (7–1)	Albers (5–2)	**Ziegler** (1)	17,742	50–55	W1
106	August 2	Nationals	7–0	**Worley** (1–2)	Cole (1–1)	—	17,890	51–55	W2
107	August 4	@ Braves	3–5	Dickey (7–7)	**Conley** (4–4)	Vizcaíno (4)	35,914	51–56	L1
108	August 5	@ Braves	2–7	Foltynewicz (10–6)	**Straily** (7–8)	Vizcaíno (5)	40,731	51–57	L2
109	August 6	@ Braves	4–1	**Ureña** (10–5)	Sims (0–2)	**Ziegler** (2)	29,651	52–57	W1
110	August 7	@ Nationals	2–3	Kintzler (4–2)	**García** (0–2)	Doolittle (9)	21,799	52–58	L1
111	August 8	@ Nationals	7–3	**Worley** (2–2)	Cole (1–2)	—	25,406	53–58	W1
112	August 9	@ Nationals	1–10	González (10–5)	**Conley** (4–5)	—	25,951	53–59	L1
113	August 10	@ Nationals	2–3	Madson (4–4)	**Tazawa** (1–2)	Doolittle (10)	23,904	53–60	L2
114	August 11	Rockies	6–3	**Tazawa** (2–2)	McGee (0–2)	**Ziegler** (3)	20,096	54–60	W1
115	August 12	Rockies	4–3	**Nicolino** (1–1)	Hoffman (6–4)	**Ziegler** (4)	20,399	55–60	W2
116	August 13	Rockies	5–3	**Guerra** (1–0)	Márquez (9–5)	**Despaigne** (1)	20,769	56–60	W3
117	August 14	Giants	8–3	**Conley** (5–5)	Blach (8–8)	—	17,906	57–60	W4
118	August 15	Giants	4–9	Bumgarner (3–5)	**Tazawa** (2–3)	—	21,694	57–61	L1
119	August 16	Giants	8–1	**Ureña** (11–5)	Cain (3–10)	—	17,102	58–61	W1
120	August 18	@ Mets	3–1	**Nicolino** (2–1)	Flexen (2–2)	**Ziegler** (5)	25,951	59–61	W2
121	August 19	@ Mets	1–8	Montero (2–8)	**Worley** (2–3)	—	30,171	59–62	L1
122	August 20	@ Mets	6–4	**Conley** (6–5)	deGrom (13–7)	**Ziegler** (6)	26,464	60–62	W1
123	August 22 (1)	@ Phillies	12–8	**Straily** (8–8)	Nola (9–9)	—	N/A	61–62	W2
124	August 22 (2)	@ Phillies	7–4	**Ureňa** (12–5)	Pivetta (4–9)	**Ziegler** (7)	20,761	62–62	W3
125	August 23	@ Phillies	0–8	Leiter (2–3)	**Nicolino** (2–2)	—	19,161	62–63	L1
126	August 24	@ Phillies	9–8	**García** (1–2)	García (1–4)	**Ziegler** (8)	18,083	63–63	W1
127	August 25	Padres	8–6	**McGowan** (8–1)	Yates (3–5)	**Ziegler** (9)	22,489	64–63	W2
128	August 26	Padres	2–1 (11)	**Tazawa** (3–3)	Torres (7–4)	—	19,963	65–63	W3
129	August 27	Padres	6–2	**Barraclough** (5–1)	Richard (6–13)	—	23,275	66–63	W4
130	August 28	@ Nationals	2–11	Scherzer (13–5)	**Ureňa** (12–6)	—	20,838	66–64	L1
131	August 29	@ Nationals	3–8	Jackson (5–3)	**Worley** (2–4)	—	25,924	66–65	L2
132	August 30	@ Nationals	0–4	Strasburg (11–4)	**Conley** (6–6)	—	25,019	66–66	L3
133	August 31	Phillies	2–3	Lively (2–5)	**Despaigne** (0–2)	Neris (17)	17,013	66–67	L4

September/October: 11–18 (Home: 8–8; Away: 3–10)

#	Date	Opponent	Score	Win	Loss	Save	Attendance	Record	Streak
134	September 1	Phillies	1–2	Nicasio (3–5)	Ziegler (1–3)	Neris (18)	17,998	66–68	L5
135	September 2	Phillies	10–9	**Straily** (9–8)	Nola (10–10)	**Steckenrider** (1)	18,262	67–68	W1
136	September 3	Phillies	1–3 (12)	Morgan (3–1)	**Tazawa** (3–4)	Neris (19)	19,404	67–69	L1
137	September 4	Nationals	2–7	Cole (2–4)	**Conley** (6–7)	—	17,349	67–70	L2
138	September 5	Nationals	1–2	Strasburg (12–4)	**Despaigne** (0–3)	Doolittle (18)	15,364	67–71	L3
139	September 6	Nationals	1–8	González (14–6)	**Peters** (0–1)	—	14,390	67–72	L4
140	September 7	@ Braves	5–6	Brothers (3–3)	**Ziegler** (1–4)	—	23,561	67–73	L5
141	September 8	@ Braves	7–1	**Ureňa** (13–6)	Foltynewicz (10–12)	—	30,056	68–73	W1
142	September 9	@ Braves	5–6	Vizcaíno (4–3)	**Barraclough** (5–2)	—	34,403	68–74	L1
143	September 10	@ Braves	8–10 (11)	Vizcaíno (5–3)	**Worley** (2–5)	—	34,974	68–75	L2
144	September 12	@ Phillies	8–9 (15)	Ramos (2–7)	**Guerra** (1–1)	—	16,439	68–76	L3
145	September 13	@ Phillies	1–8	Nola (11–10)	**Straily** (9–9)	—	16,745	68–77	L4
146	September 14	@ Phillies	0–10	Thompson (2–2)	**Worley** (2–6)	—	16,302	68–78	L5
147	September 15	Brewers (Note: Games moved to Miller Park for safety concerns due to Hurricane Irma.)	2–10	Hughes (4–3)	**Ellington** (0–1)	—	19,369	68–79	L6
148	September 16	Brewers	7–4	**Conley** (7–7)	Davies (17–9)	—	25,079	69–79	W1
149	September 17	Brewers	3–10	Woodruff (2–2)	**Peters** (0–2)	—	24,535	69–80	L1
150	September 18	Mets	13–1	**Straily** (10–9)	Harvey (5–6)	**Worley** (1)	16,385	70–80	W1
151	September 19	Mets	5–4 (10)	**Barraclough** (6–2)	Sewald (0–6)	—	16,405	71–80	W2
152	September 20	Mets	9–2	**Ureňa** (14–6)	Montero (5–11)	—	16,033	72–80	W3
153	September 22	@ D-backs	11–13	Hoover (2–1)	**McGowan** (8–2)	Rodney (38)	34,588	72–81	L1
154	September 23	@ D-backs	12–6	**Ellington** (1–1)	Walker (9–9)	—	39,259	73–81	W1
155	September 24	@ D-backs	2–3	Rodney (5–4)	**Nicolino** (2–3)	—	31,539	73–82	L1
156	September 25	@ Rockies	5–4	**Despaigne** (1–3)	Chatwood (8–14)	**Barraclough** (1)	24,685	74–82	W1
157	September 26	@ Rockies	0–6	Anderson (6–6)	**Urena** (14–7)	—	30,409	74–83	L1
158	September 27	@ Rockies	9–15	Gray (10–4)	**Conley** (7–8)	—	27,497	74–84	L2
159	September 28	Braves	7–1	**Peters** (1–2)	Teherán (11–13)	—	17,305	75–84	W1
160	September 29	Braves	6–5	**Conley** (8–8)	Winker (0–1)	**Ziegler** (10)	19,527	76–84	W2
161	September 30	Braves	10–2	**Despaigne** (2–3)	Sims (3–6)	—	25,264	77–84	W3
162	October 1	Braves	5–8	Winkler (1–1)	**Tazawa** (3–5)	Vizcaíno (14)	25,222	77–85	L1

Legend: = Win = Loss = Postponement
Bold = Marlins team member

== Roster ==
2017 Miami Marlins
Roster
Pitchers: 46 Kyle Barraclough; 30 Hunter Cervenka; 54 Wei-Yin Chen; 61 Adam Conley; 43 Odrisamer Despaigne; 49 Brian Ellington; 66 Jarlin García; 40 Javy Guerra; 34 Tom Koehler; 31 Jeff Locke; 22 Dustin McGowan; 20 Justin Nicolino; 50 Chris O'Grady; 76 Dillon Peters; 35 David Phelps; 44 A. J. Ramos; 71 Drew Steckenrider; 58 Dan Straily; 25 Junichi Tazawa; 62 José Ureña; 36 Edinson Vólquez; 64 Nick Wittgren; 45 Vance Worley; 29 Brad Ziegler	Catchers: 17 A. J. Ellis; 11 J. T. Realmuto; Infielders: 55 Brian Anderson; 12 Mike Avilés; 41 Justin Bour; 10 Christian Colón; 32 Derek Dietrich; 9 Dee Gordon; 3 Adeiny Hechavarria; 1 Steve Lombardozzi Jr.; 28 Tyler Moore; 14 Martín Prado; 39 J. T. Riddle; 19 Miguel Rojas; 18 Tomás Telis	Outfielders: 13 Marcell Ozuna; 27 Giancarlo Stanton; 51 Ichiro Suzuki; 21 Christian Yelich	Manager: 8 Don Mattingly; Coaches: 26 Lorenzo Bundy (outfield, baserunning); 33 Fredi González (third base); 7 Perry Hill (first base); 4 Frank Menechino (assistant hitting); 47 Juan Nieves (pitching); 23 Brian Schneider (catching); 59 Ed Lucas (administrative coach); 6 Mike Pagliarulo (hitting); 75 Jeff Urgelles (bullpen catcher); 38 Tim Wallach (bench); 24 Dean Treanor (bullpen)

== Statistics ==
=== Batting ===
(Through October 1, 2017)
Players in bold are on the MLB active roster as of the 2022 season.

Note: G = Games played; AB = At bats; R = Runs; H = Hits; 2B = Doubles; 3B = Triples; HR = Home runs; RBI = Runs batted in; SB = Stolen bases; BB = Walks; K = Strikeouts; Avg. = Batting average; OBP = On-base percentage; SLG = Slugging percentage; TB = Total bases

Player	G	AB	R	H	2B	3B	HR	RBI	SB	BB	K	AVG	OBP	SLG	TB
**Brian Anderson**	25	84	11	22	7	1	0	8	0	10	28	.262	.337	.309	31
Mike Avilés	37	86	5	20	2	0	1	8	0	6	15	.233	.298	.291	25
**Kyle Barraclough**	62	1	0	0	0	0	0	0	0	0	1	.000	.000	.000	0
Justin Bour	108	377	52	109	18	0	25	83	1	47	95	.289	.366	.536	202
Wei-Yin Chen	8	8	0	1	0	0	0	0	0	0	3	.125	.125	.125	1
Christian Colón	17	33	3	5	1	0	0	0	0	4	7	.152	.243	.182	6
Adam Conley	20	24	3	3	0	0	0	0	0	2	14	.125	.192	.125	3
Odrisamer Despaigne	18	19	0	2	0	0	0	1	0	0	5	.105	.105	.105	2
Derek Dietrich	135	406	56	101	22	5	13	53	0	36	98	.249	.334	.424	172
Brian Ellington	40	1	0	0	0	0	0	0	0	0	0	.000	.000	.000	0
A.J. Ellis	51	143	17	30	5	0	6	14	0	12	29	.210	.298	.371	53
**Dee Gordon**	158	653	114	201	20	9	2	33	60	25	93	.308	.341	.375	245
Javy Guerra	16	1	0	0	0	0	0	0	0	0	1	.000	.000	.000	0
Adeiny Hechavarria	20	65	8	18	2	1	1	6	0	1	9	.277	.288	.385	25
Tom Koehler	11	21	0	1	0	0	0	0	0	0	15	.048	.048	.048	1
Jeff Locke	7	10	0	0	0	0	0	0	0	1	9	.000	.091	.000	0
Steve Lombardozzi Jr.	2	8	0	0	0	0	0	0	0	0	2	.000	.000	.000	0
Dustin McGowan	61	6	0	0	0	0	0	0	0	0	6	.000	.000	.000	0
Tyler Moore	104	187	17	43	14	0	6	30	0	10	56	.230	.267	.401	75
Justin Nicolino	20	11	0	0	0	0	0	0	0	0	2	.000	.000	.000	0
Chris O'Grady	13	8	0	0	0	0	0	0	0	0	5	.000	.000	.000	0
**Marcell Ozuna**	159	613	93	191	30	2	37	124	1	64	144	.312	.376	.548	336
**Dillon Peters**	6	9	1	0	0	0	0	0	0	0	8	.000	.000	.000	0
**David Phelps**	43	1	0	0	0	0	0	0	0	0	1	.000	.000	.000	0
Martin Prado	37	140	13	35	9	0	2	12	0	6	22	.250	.279	.357	50
**J. T. Realmuto**	141	532	68	148	31	5	17	65	8	36	106	.278	.332	.451	240
**J. T. Riddle**	70	228	20	57	13	1	3	31	0	12	50	.250	.282	.355	81
**Miguel Rojas**	90	272	37	79	16	2	1	26	2	27	32	.290	.361	.375	102
**Giancarlo Stanton**	159	597	123	168	32	0	59	132	2	85	163	.281	.376	.631	377
Dan Straily	31	55	2	4	1	0	0	1	0	1	33	.073	.089	.091	5
Ichiro Suzuki	136	196	19	50	6	0	3	20	1	17	35	.255	.318	.332	65
Junichi Tazawa	53	1	0	0	0	0	0	0	0	0	0	.000	.000	.000	0
Tomás Telis	48	104	13	25	5	3	0	9	0	3	10	.240	.279	.346	36
**José Ureña**	32	48	3	5	1	0	0	2	0	0	28	.104	.104	.125	6
Edinson Volquez	17	26	0	5	0	0	0	1	0	1	11	.192	.214	.192	5
**Nick Wittgren**	34	4	0	0	0	0	0	0	0	0	1	.000	.000	.000	0
Vance Worley	25	22	0	4	0	0	0	3	0	0	8	.182	.182	.182	4
**Christian Yelich**	156	602	100	170	36	2	18	81	16	80	137	.282	.369	.439	264
**Team totals**	**162**	**5602**	**778**	**1497**	**271**	**31**	**194**	**743**	**91**	**486**	**1282**	**.267**	**.331**	**.431**	**2412**

=== Pitching ===
(Through October 1, 2017)
Players in bold are on the MLB active roster as of the 2022 season.

Note: W = Wins; L = Losses; ERA = Earned run average; G = Games pitched; GS = Games started; SV = Saves; IP = Innings pitched; H = Hits allowed; R = Runs allowed; ER = Earned runs allowed; BB = Walks allowed; K = Strikeouts

Player	W	L	ERA	G	GS	SV	IP	H	R	ER	BB	K
**Kyle Barraclough**	6	2	3.00	66	0	1	66.0	53	25	22	38	76
Hunter Cervenka	0	0	15.43	5	0	0	4.2	1	8	8	8	6
Wei-Yin Chen	2	1	3.82	9	5	0	33.0	25	14	14	9	25
Adam Conley	8	8	6.14	22	20	0	102.2	114	74	70	42	72
Odrisamer Despaigne	2	3	4.01	18	8	1	58.1	57	31	26	24	31
Brian Ellington	0	0	7.25	42	0	0	44.2	48	39	36	35	48
**Jarlin García**	1	2	4.73	68	0	0	53.1	47	29	28	17	42
Javy Guerra	1	1	3.00	16	0	0	21.0	23	8	7	7	12
Tom Koehler	1	5	7.92	12	12	0	55.2	67	50	49	29	44
Jeff Locke	0	5	8.16	7	7	0	32.0	42	30	29	15	26
Dustin McGowan	8	2	4.75	63	0	0	77.2	77	42	41	27	64
Justin Nicolino	2	3	5.06	20	8	0	48.0	66	33	27	20	26
Chris O'Grady	2	1	4.36	13	6	0	33.0	33	16	16	18	30
**Dillon Peters**	1	2	5.17	6	6	0	31.1	32	18	18	19	27
**David Phelps**	2	4	3.45	44	0	0	47.0	42	20	18	21	51
A.J. Ramos	2	4	3.63	40	0	20	39.2	30	17	16	22	47
**Drew Steckenrider**	1	1	2.34	37	0	1	34.2	30	13	9	18	54
Dan Straily	10	9	4.26	33	33	0	181.1	176	90	86	60	170
Junichi Tazawa	3	5	5.69	55	0	0	55.1	55	35	35	22	38
**José Ureña**	14	7	3.82	34	28	0	169.2	152	77	72	64	113
Edinson Vólquez	4	8	4.19	17	17	0	92.1	78	46	43	53	81
**Nick Wittgren**	3	1	4.68	38	0	0	42.1	46	22	22	13	43
Vance Worley	2	6	6.91	24	12	1	71.2	99	56	55	30	50
Brad Ziegler	1	4	4.79	53	0	10	47.0	57	29	25	16	26
**Team totals**	**77**	**85**	**4.82**	**162**	**162**	**34**	**1442.2**	**1450**	**822**	**772**	**627**	**1202**

== Awards and honors ==
All-Star Game

- Marcell Ozuna, Outfield, Starter
- Giancarlo Stanton, Outfield, Reserve

== Farm system ==
Level	Team	League	Manager
AAA	New Orleans Baby Cakes	Pacific Coast League	Arnie Beyeler
AA	Jacksonville Jumbo Shrimp	Southern League	Randy Ready
A-Advanced	Jupiter Hammerheads	Florida State League	Kevin Randel
A	Greensboro Grasshoppers	South Atlantic League	Todd Pratt
A-Short Season	Batavia Muckdogs	New York–Penn League	Mike Jacobs
Rookie	GCL Marlins	Gulf Coast League	John Pachot
Rookie	DSL Marlins	Dominican Summer League	Ray Nunez

== See also ==
- 50 home run club
- List of Major League Baseball career putouts as a right fielder leaders
- List of Major League Baseball no-hitters
