= Christopher O'Grady =

Christopher O'Grady may refer to:

- Chris O'Grady (born 1986), English footballer
- Chris O'Grady (baseball) (born 1990), American baseball player

== See also ==
- Christine O'Grady
