= Ryan LaMarre =

American baseball player (born 1988)

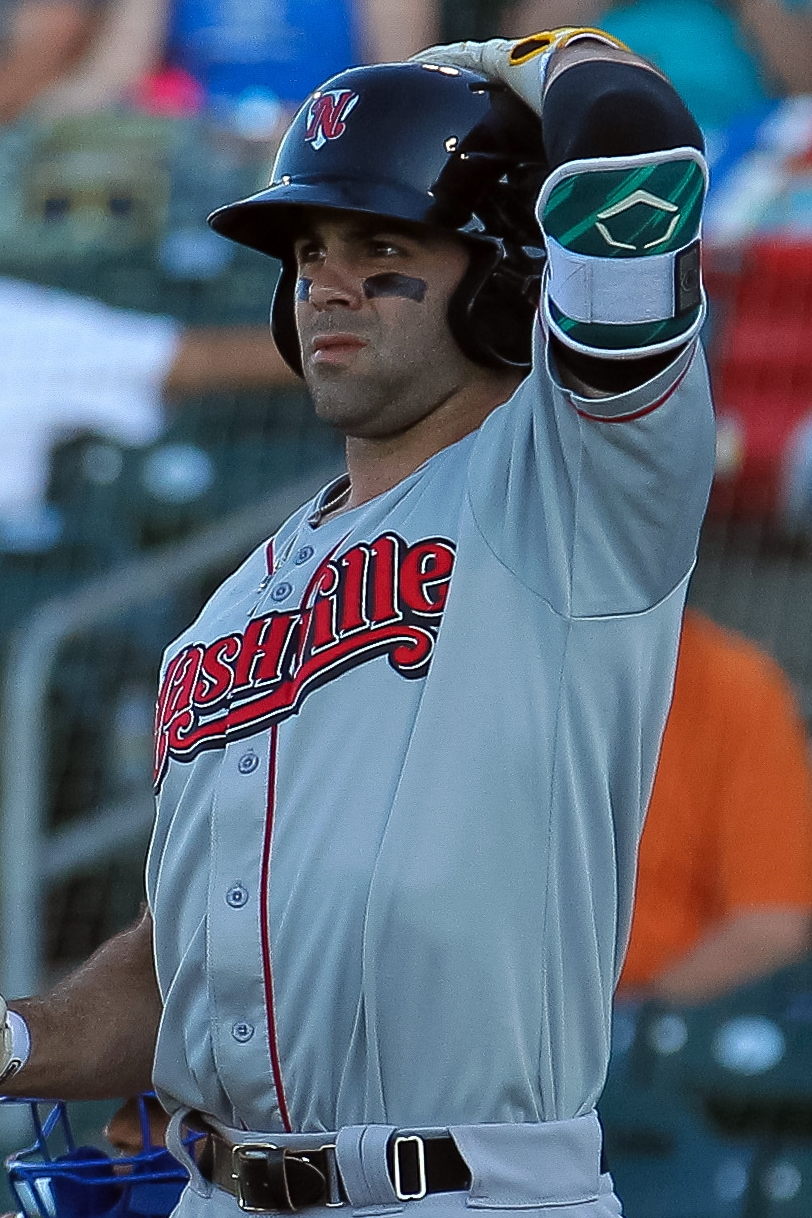
- LaMarre with the Nashville Sounds
- Outfielder
- Born: November 21, 1988 (age 37); Royal Oak, Michigan, U.S.
- Batted: Right Threw: Left

MLB debut
- August 22, 2015, for the Cincinnati Reds

Last MLB appearance
- July 29, 2021, for the New York Yankees

MLB statistics
- Batting average: .232
- Home runs: 6
- Runs batted in: 25
- Stats at Baseball Reference

Teams
- Cincinnati Reds (2015); Boston Red Sox (2016); Oakland Athletics (2017); Minnesota Twins (2018); Chicago White Sox (2018); Minnesota Twins (2019); New York Yankees (2021)

Ryan Michael LaMarre (born November 21, 1988) is an American former professional baseball outfielder. He played in Major League Baseball (MLB) for the Cincinnati Reds, Boston Red Sox, Oakland Athletics, Minnesota Twins, Chicago White Sox, and New York Yankees.

== Amateur career ==
LaMarre attended Lumen Christi Catholic High School in Jackson, Michigan, where he earned 12 varsity letters in baseball, football, and hockey.

In baseball, LaMarre was named All-State three times, and hit .548 with 18 home runs as a senior. LaMarre set the school record for career home runs with 38.

In football, LaMarre won two state titles and made it to the state final during his senior season. He also was All-Conference in football, and compiled 339 tackles throughout his high school career.

In hockey, LaMarre won All-State honors twice and was team captain and MVP his final two seasons. He is the all-time assists leader for Lumen Christi, with 96, and is second in scoring, with 176.

After high school, LaMarre attended the University of Michigan. During his freshman year at Michigan, LaMarre batted .305 in 40 games. As a sophomore, he batted .344 with 12 home runs, playing and starting all 53 games. During his junior and final season, LaMarre batted .419 but only played in 36 games.

In 2009, he played collegiate summer baseball with the Wareham Gatemen of the Cape Cod Baseball League.

== Professional career ==
=== Cincinnati Reds ===
The Cincinnati Reds drafted LaMarre in the second round, with the 62nd overall selection, of the 2010 Major League Baseball draft. He was added to the Reds' 40-man roster on November 20, 2013, in order to be protected from the Rule 5 draft. LaMarre was designated for assignment by the Reds on August 12, 2014. The Reds released LaMarre, and then re-signed him to a minor league contract on August 19.

The Reds promoted LaMarre to the major leagues on August 20, 2015. He made his major league debut on August 22, and recorded his first major league hit the next day. In 21 games during his rookie campaign, LaMarre went 2–for–25 (.080). On December 2, LaMarre was non–tendered by Cincinnati and became a free agent.

=== Boston Red Sox ===
LaMarre signed a minor league contract with the Boston Red Sox on December 14, 2015. On June 18, 2016, he was promoted from the Triple-A Pawtucket Red Sox to the major leagues. On July 2, LaMarre pitched in the top of the ninth inning in a 21–2 loss by the Red Sox to the Los Angeles Angels. LaMarre gave up two hits but no runs, the only relief pitcher not to give up any runs in the game. He was designated for assignment on July 7, after the Red Sox traded for Aaron Hill. LaMarre cleared waivers and was sent outright to Triple-A Worcester on July 11. Overall for the Red Sox, LaMarre appeared in 6 MLB games, batting 0-for-5. He elected free agency following the season on November 7.

=== Oakland Athletics ===
On November 28, 2016, LaMarre signed a one-year contract with the Los Angeles Angels, but did not make a major league appearance for them. The Angels traded him to the Oakland Athletics for a player to be named later on April 23, 2017. He was assigned to the Triple-A Nashville Sounds where he played one game before being recalled to Oakland after Rajai Davis was placed on the disabled list. LaMarre was designated for assignment on June 17, to create room for Michael Brady who had his contract purchased.

Overall for the Athletics, LaMarre appeared in 3 MLB games, batting 0-for-7.

=== Minnesota Twins (first stint) ===
LaMarre signed a minor league contract with the Minnesota Twins on November 29, 2017. He made the Twins' 2018 Opening Day 25-man roster. On April 7, he got his first major league RBI. LaMarre made his second career pitching appearance on April 23, pitching 2/3 of an inning and giving up one earned run against the New York Yankees. He came to bat in the top of the following inning as the pitcher and struck out. LaMarre was designated for assignment on July 2, 2018.

=== Chicago White Sox ===
On July 9, 2018, LaMarre was claimed off waivers by the Chicago White Sox. He hit his first career home run on August 14, against the Detroit Tigers in Detroit. On August 29, he knocked in all four runs with two doubles against CC Sabathia, and a home run, as the White Sox beat the Yankees 4–1. In 33 games for Chicago, LaMarre batted .303/.324/.485 with two home runs and 10 RBI. On October 26, he was removed from the 40–man roster and sent outright to the Triple–A Charlotte Knights. He elected free agency following the season on November 2.

=== Atlanta Braves ===
On November 19, 2018, LaMarre signed a minor league deal with the Atlanta Braves with an invitation to spring training. LaMarre spent most of 2019 with the Braves' Triple–A affiliate, the Gwinnett Stripers, where he played in 112 games while batting .311 with 9 HR and 53 RBI.

=== Minnesota Twins (second stint) ===
On September 8, 2019, LaMarre was traded to the Twins for cash considerations. LaMarre spent the last month of the season with the Twins and played in 14 MLB games batting .217 with 2 HR and 3 RBI. LaMarre was outrighted off the Twins roster on October 28, and elected free agency the next day.

=== Tampa Bay Rays ===
On January 13, 2020, LaMarre signed a minor league contract with the Tampa Bay Rays that included an invitation to spring training. LaMarre exercised his opt out clause on July 18, and became a free agent.

=== Chicago Cubs ===
On July 24, 2020, LaMarre signed a minor league contract with the Chicago Cubs. He was released by the organization on September 10.

=== New York Yankees ===
On December 12, 2020, LaMarre signed a minor league contract with the New York Yankees organization. On May 16, 2021, LaMarre was selected to the active roster, making his Yankees debut on the same day in a game against the Baltimore Orioles in center field, going 0-for-3. LaMarre went 0-for-7 in 3 games for the Yankees before being placed on the injured list with a right hamstring strain. On June 16, he activated off of the injured list and outrighted off of the 40-man roster. On July 18, he was re-selected to the Yankees’ active roster after Tim Locastro was placed on the IL with an ACL injury. The same day, LaMarre hit another home run, a two-run shot off of Boston Red Sox pitcher Yacksel Ríos. On July 21, LaMarre earned his first walk-off win as he delivered a pinch hit single to right field to win the game in the 10th inning against the Philadelphia Phillies. On July 30, LaMarre was designated for assignment by the Yankees. On August 2, he was outrighted to the Triple-A Scranton/Wilkes-Barre Railriders. On October 7, LaMarre elected free agency.

On March 16, 2022, LaMarre re-signed with the Yankees organization on a minor league contract. In 53 games for Triple-A Scranton, he batted .297/.409/.458 with five home runs, 21 RBI, and seven stolen bases. LaMarre elected free agency following the season on November 10.

=== Minnesota Twins (third stint) ===
On January 11, 2023, LaMarre signed a minor league contract with the Minnesota Twins organization. In 28 games for the Triple–A St. Paul Saints, he batted .204/.315/.366 with 3 home runs and 12 RBI. On July 29, LaMarre was released by Minnesota.

LaMarre retired from professional baseball following the 2023 season.
