= Ryan Dull =

American baseball player (born 1989)

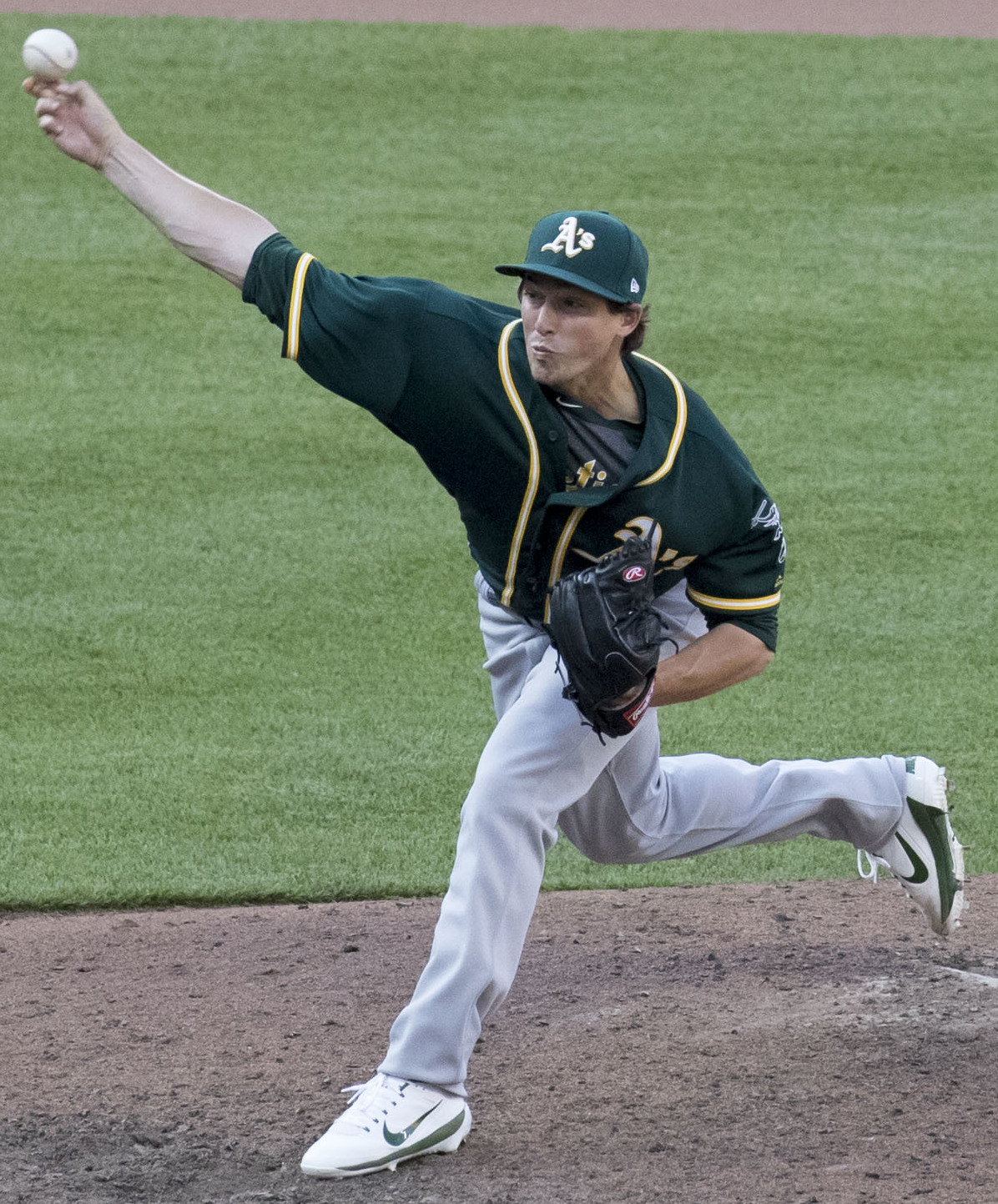
- Dull pitching for the Oakland Athletics in 2017
- Pitcher
- Born: October 2, 1989 (age 37); Winston-Salem, North Carolina, U.S.
- Batted: Right Threw: Right

MLB debut
- September 1, 2015, for the Oakland Athletics

Last MLB appearance
- September 27, 2019, for the Toronto Blue Jays

MLB statistics
- Win–loss record: 8–9
- Earned run average: 4.31
- Strikeouts: 170
- Stats at Baseball Reference

Teams
- Oakland Athletics (2015–2019); New York Yankees (2019); Toronto Blue Jays (2019)

Ryan Christopher Dull (born October 2, 1989) is an American former professional baseball pitcher. He played in Major League Baseball (MLB) for the Oakland Athletics, New York Yankees, and Toronto Blue Jays.

== Playing career ==
=== Amateur career ===
Dull played high school baseball at East Forsyth High School in Kernersville, North Carolina where he is in the hall of fame for athletics and college baseball at the University of North Carolina at Asheville.

=== Oakland Athletics ===
==== Minor leagues ====
The Oakland Athletics selected Dull in the 32nd round of the 2012 Major League Baseball draft, and he signed.

Dull made his professional debut that season with the Arizona League Athletics and he was promoted to the Vermont Lake Monsters in July. In 31 2/3 total relief innings pitched between the two teams, he was 5–1 with a 2.56 ERA. In 2013, he played for the Beloit Snappers, Stockton Ports, and Midland RockHounds, compiling a combined 2–5 record and 2.40 ERA in 45 total relief appearances, and in 2014, he pitched with Midland, going 5–5 with a 2.88 ERA in 40 relief appearances. Dull spent 2015 with Midland and the Nashville Sounds, pitching to a combined 3–2 record and 0.74 ERA in 61 innings pitched in relief.

==== Major leagues ====
Dull was called up to the majors for the first time on September 1, 2015, and made his major league debut that night, pitching one inning of relief against the Los Angeles Angels of Anaheim. Dull finished the 2015 season with 13 appearances, compiling a 1–2 record and 4.24 ERA. In 2016, Dull began the season in Oakland's bullpen and was a mainstay, appearing in 70 games while going 5–5 with a 2.42 ERA. In 2017, Dull was placed on the disabled list at the end of May due to a right knee strain, and he did not return until late July. In 49 relief appearances for Oakland, he was 2–2 with a 5.14 ERA.

Dull began 2018 with Oakland, but was optioned to Nashville in May. He pitched most of the season in Triple–A, appearing in 28 games for Oakland. Dull made 7 appearances for the Athletics in 2019, but struggled immensely to a 12.00 ERA with 8 strikeouts in 9.0 innings. On August 3, 2019, Dull was designated for assignment by Oakland following the waiver claim of Dustin Garneau.

=== San Francisco Giants ===
On August 5, 2019, Dull was claimed off waivers by the San Francisco Giants. In two appearances for the Triple–A Sacramento River Cats, he allowed three runs in as many innings. On August 12, Dull was designated for assignment following the waiver claim of Burch Smith.

=== New York Yankees ===
On August 14, 2019, Dull was claimed off waivers by the New York Yankees. In three games for the Yankees, he surrendered five runs on five hits with four strikeouts in 2 1/3 innings pitched. On September 15, Dull was designated for assignment by New York.

=== Toronto Blue Jays ===
On September 18, 2019, Dull was claimed off waivers by the Toronto Blue Jays. After being designated for assignment on September 20, he cleared waivers and was assigned to Triple A on September 24. On September 25, the Blue Jays selected Dull's contract. He made one appearance for Toronto, allowing one run in 1 1/3 innings.

Dull re–signed with the Blue Jays on a minor league contract on January 18, 2020. He did not play in a game in 2020 due to the cancellation of the minor league season because of the COVID-19 pandemic. Dull became a free agent on November 2.

=== Seattle Mariners ===
On January 20, 2021, Dull signed with the Winnipeg Goldeyes of the American Association of Professional Baseball. However, on May 5, he left the Goldeyes, having never played a game for them.

The same day as his departure from Winnipeg, Dull signed a minor league contract with the Seattle Mariners organization. Dull pitched to a 6.06 ERA in 28 appearances for the Triple-A Tacoma Rainiers before he was released on August 12.

=== High Point Rockers ===
On August 24, 2021, Dull signed with the High Point Rockers of the Atlantic League of Professional Baseball. He made 16 appearances for the team down the stretch, posting a 1-1 record and 2.87 ERA with 26 strikeouts in 15 2/3 innings pitched. He became a free agent following the season.

On April 9, 2022, Dull re-signed with the Rockers for the 2022 season. Appearing in 50 games, Dull registered a 7-1 record and 3.88 ERA with 72 strikeouts and 13 saves in 51.0 innings of work. He became a free agent following the season.

Dull returned to the Rockers for the 2023 season. In 46 appearances out of the bullpen, he registered a 1.40 ERA with 60 strikeouts and 18 saves across 45.0 innings pitched. Following the season, Dull was named an Atlantic League All–Star.

== Coaching career ==
On March 12, 2024, Dull announced his retirement from pitching, taking a job as a bench coach and director of player personnel for the High Point Rockers of the Atlantic League of Professional Baseball.
