= Jaycob Brugman =

American baseball player (born 1992)

- Outfielder
- Born: January 18, 1992 (age 34); Chandler, Arizona, U.S.
- Batted: Left Threw: Left

MLB debut
- June 9, 2017, for the Oakland Athletics

Last MLB appearance
- August 9, 2017, for the Oakland Athletics

MLB statistics (through 2017 season)
- Batting average: .266
- Home runs: 3
- Runs batted in: 12
- Stats at Baseball Reference

Teams
- Oakland Athletics (2017)

Jaycob Hull Brugman (born January 18, 1992) is an American former professional baseball outfielder. He played in Major League Baseball (MLB) for the Oakland Athletics.

== Career ==
Brugman attended Desert Vista High School in Phoenix, Arizona. Playing for the school's baseball team, Brugman was named All-State as a junior and senior. The New York Yankees selected Brugman in the 39th round of the 2010 MLB draft. He did not sign, instead enrolling at Brigham Young University (BYU) to play college baseball for the BYU Cougars. As a freshman, Brugman had a .317 batting average, nine home runs, and 13 stolen bases, and was named Mountain West Conference Freshman of the Year. He batted .271 with two home runs as a sophomore, but rebounded to bat .317 with 11 home runs as a junior.

=== Oakland Athletics ===
The Oakland Athletics selected Brugman in the 17th round of the 2013 MLB draft. Brugman began his professional career with the Vermont Lake Monsters of the Low–A New York-Penn League that same year and spent the whole season there, batting .261 with one home run and 23 RBI in 49 games

Brugman spent the 2014 season with Beloit Snappers of the Single–A Midwest League and the Stockton Ports of the High–A California League, slashing a combined .280/.354/.506 with 21 home runs and 72 RBI in 120 games. In 2015, Brugman played for the Midland RockHounds of the Double-A Texas League where he batted .260 with six home runs and 63 RBI in 132 games. He began the 2016 season with Midland and was promoted to the Nashville Sounds of the Triple-A Pacific Coast League on May 21. In 132 games between the two teams he posted a .285 batting average with 12 home runs and 87 RBI. On November 18, 2016, the Athletics added Brugman to their 40-man roster to protect him from the Rule 5 draft. He began the 2017 season with Nashville.

The Athletics promoted Brugman to the major leagues for the first time on June 9, 2017, to make his major league debut that night. He stayed with Oakland before being optioned back to Nashville in August, and he finished the season there. In 48 games for Oakland, he batted .266 with three home runs and 12 RBIs, and in 38 games for Nashville, he batted .275.

Brugman was designated for assignment by Oakland on November 20, 2017.

=== Baltimore Orioles ===
The Baltimore Orioles claimed Brugman off of waivers on November 22, 2017, and designated him for assignment on February 21. He cleared waivers, and the Orioles outrighted him to the Norfolk Tides of the Triple-A International League. He was released by the Orioles organization on May 24, 2019.

=== Seattle Mariners ===
On May 31, 2019, Brugman signed a minor league contract with the Seattle Mariners. In 78 appearances for the Triple-A Tacoma Rainiers, he batted .283/.363/.601 with 23 home runs and 65 RBI. Brugman elected free agency following the season on November 4.

=== Chicago White Sox ===
On January 21, 2020, Brugman signed a minor league contract with the Chicago White Sox. Brugman did not play in a game in 2020 due to the cancellation of the minor league season because of the COVID-19 pandemic. He became a free agent on November 2.

=== Atlanta Braves ===
On December 26, 2020, Brugman signed a minor league contract with the Atlanta Braves organization. Brugman only played in 1 game with the Triple-A Gwinnett Stripers before going down with an injury. He was released by the Braves organization on July 24, 2021.

== Personal life ==
Brugman is a member of the Church of Jesus Christ of Latter-day Saints. He and his wife, Ali, were married on August 17, 2012. Their first child, Millie Alexis, was born on September 2, 2013. Their second child, Beck Jaycob, was born in October 2016. Due to complications, Beck was born about 8 weeks early & spent around a month in a NICU.
