= Andrew Triggs =

American baseball player (born 1989)

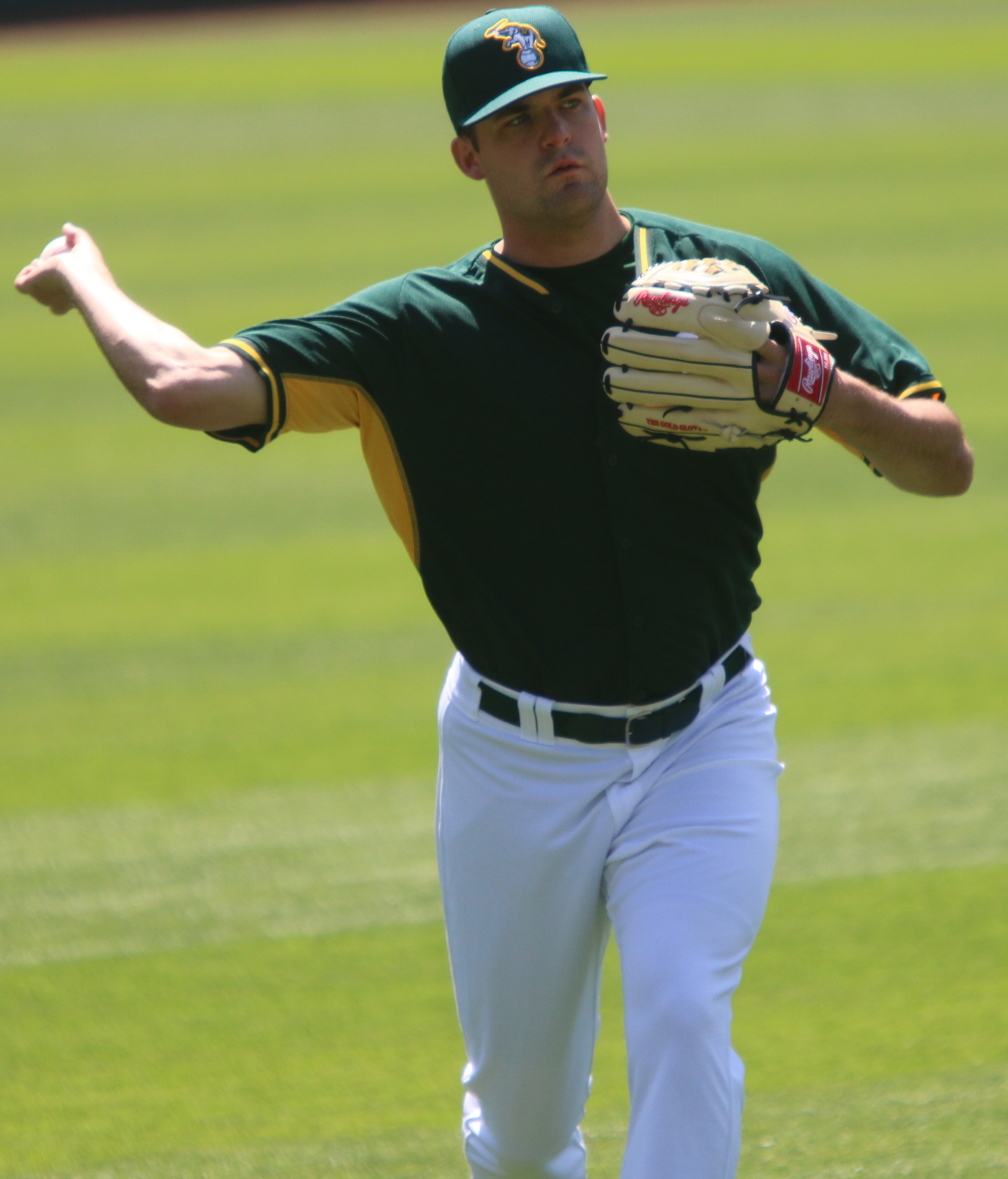
- Triggs with the Oakland Athletics in 2016
- Pitcher
- Born: March 16, 1989 (age 37); Nashville, Tennessee, U.S.
- Batted: Right Threw: Right

MLB debut
- April 25, 2016, for the Oakland Athletics

Last MLB appearance
- September 26, 2020, for the Boston Red Sox

MLB statistics
- Win–loss record: 9–10
- Earned run average: 4.68
- Strikeouts: 155
- Stats at Baseball Reference

Teams
- Oakland Athletics (2016–2018); San Francisco Giants (2020); Boston Red Sox (2020)

Andrew Austin Triggs (born March 16, 1989) is an American former professional baseball pitcher. He played in Major League Baseball (MLB) for the Oakland Athletics, San Francisco Giants, and Boston Red Sox. The Kansas City Royals selected Triggs in the 19th round of the 2012 MLB draft; he made his MLB debut in 2016. Listed at 6 feet 4 inches (1.93 m) and 233 pounds (106 kg), Triggs throws and bats right-handed.

== Amateur career ==
Triggs graduated from Montgomery Bell Academy in Nashville, Tennessee, in 2007. He attended the University of Southern California, where he graduated in 2011 magna cum laude with a degree in political science. He spent the 2011–12 academic year in the university's MBA program. He was the number one pitcher in the rotation in 2010, 2011, and 2012, All-Pac-10 Conference honorable mention in 2010 and 2011, and a member of the All-Academic first team each season from 2009 through 2012. Triggs was named 2012 Pac-12 Baseball Spring Scholar-Athlete of the Year. He was also a captain of the 2011 and 2012 teams. He posted a career ERA of 3.74 over 342 innings, with 269 strikeouts, 89 walks, 11 home runs allowed, and a win–loss record of 17–20. He had 8 complete games at USC and 9 games of 10 or more strikeouts, including 13 strikeouts over 7 2/3 innings against Washington State in the final game of 2011. He was also named to the Baseball America 2012 All-Fitt Team.

He was drafted by the Cleveland Indians in the 24th round of the 2010 Major League Baseball draft and the San Francisco Giants in the 21st round of the 2011 Major League Baseball draft, but did not sign either time.

== Professional career ==
=== Kansas City Royals ===
The Kansas City Royals selected Triggs in the 19th round of the 2012 Major League Baseball draft and he signed.

He was named 2012 First Year Minor League Pitcher of the Year by the Professional Baseball Scouts of Southern California after going 1-1 with 4 saves and a 1.76 ERA. Triggs was fifth in the Carolina League (High A) in saves in 2013. He led the Texas League (Double-A) in saves in 2014 with 19, and was named to the mid-season Texas League All-Star Team in 2014. He was promoted to the Omaha Storm Chasers (Triple-A) at the end of the 2014 season and was a member of the Storm Chasers Triple-A National Championship team, pitching two innings in the championship game, with one hit, no runs, and four strikeouts.

=== Baltimore Orioles ===
Triggs was traded by Kansas City to the Baltimore Orioles in April 2015 and spent the year with the Bowie Baysox where he compiled an ERA of 1.03 (leading the league), a WHIP of 0.87 (3rd in the league), and was 17-for-17 in save opportunities. Bowie also won its first Eastern League Championship in 2015. The Orioles added him to their 40-man roster after the season.

=== Oakland Athletics ===
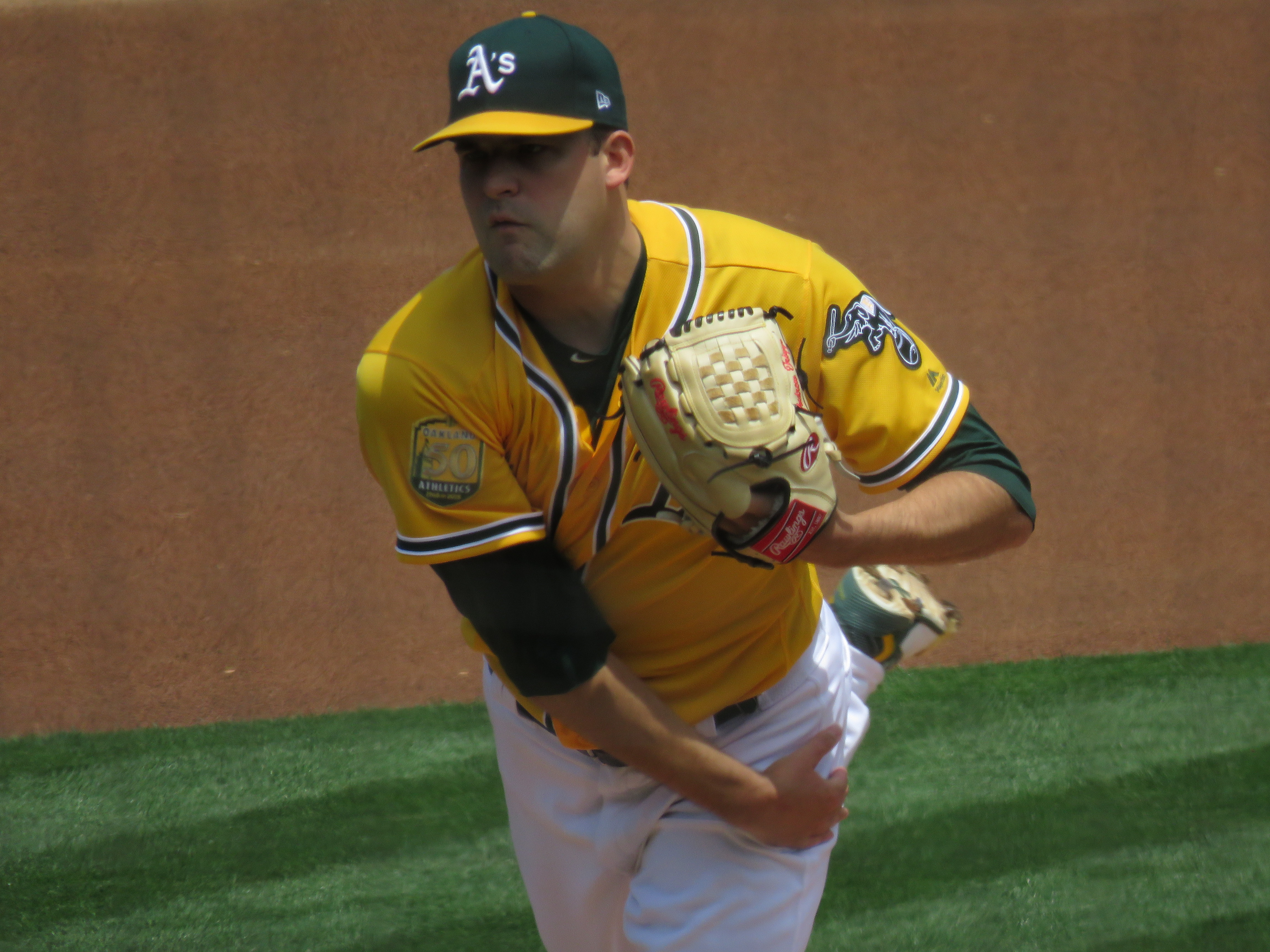
Triggs in 2018

On March 10, 2016, Triggs was placed on release waivers after the Orioles signed Pedro Álvarez. On March 13, he was claimed by the Oakland Athletics. Triggs began the season with the Triple-A Nashville Sounds, pitching out of the bullpen in six games. On April 25, he was recalled by the Athletics. He made his MLB debut that night, pitching one inning of relief and allowing no hits with one strikeout against the Detroit Tigers. He made his second appearance in the eighth inning against Baltimore on May 7, striking out the side in order, including the first batter, Pedro Álvarez. Triggs made a total of 24 appearances with 56.1 innings pitched in 2016, finishing with an ERA of 4.31. In his first ten appearances, he produced an ERA of 8.00 and an opponents' batting average of .312. In his next 14 appearances, including six starts, he compiled an ERA of 2.58, an opponents' batting average of .224, and a WHIP of 1.05, with 37 strikeouts and 8 walks over 38.1 innings. In six starts, including his last five appearances, Triggs was 1–1 with an ERA of 2.81, an opponents' batting average of .191, and a WHIP of .75, with 22 strikeouts and one walk in 25.2 innings. His eight trips to the minors and back are thought to be an Oakland club record. His season ended on September 2 due to a lower back strain.

Injuries to a few starters to begin the season opened the door for Triggs to start the 2017 season in the rotation. For the first month of the season, he went 4-1 with a 1.84 ERA. He was placed on the disabled list at the beginning of June with a hip and back injury. On July 13, Triggs underwent season ending hip surgery. In 2017 he was 5-6 with a 4.27 ERA.

On September 18, 2018, the team announced that Triggs would undergo thoracic outlet syndrome, effectively ending his season. He ended the season with a record of 3–1 in 9 starts.

In 2019 with Triple-A Las Vegas he pitched only 2.2 innings. Triggs was designated for assignment on July 31, 2019, and released a couple of days later.

=== San Francisco Giants ===
On August 30, 2019, Triggs signed a minor league deal with the San Francisco Giants. He was added to the 40-man roster on August 2, 2020. That day, he made his only appearance with the team, giving up three earned runs in one-third of an inning, taking the loss against the Texas Rangers. He was designated for assignment on August 12.

=== Boston Red Sox ===
On August 19, 2020, Triggs was claimed off waivers by the Boston Red Sox. He was added to the team's active roster on September 2, making his Red Sox debut that day against the Atlanta Braves. On September 15, the team placed Triggs on the injured list with a right radial nerve irritation; he was activated on September 26. Overall with the 2020 Red Sox, Triggs appeared in four games (two starts), compiling an 0–1 record with 4.50 ERA and seven strikeouts in eight innings pitched. On October 26, Triggs was outrighted off of the 40-man roster and elected free agency.
