= Chris O'Grady (baseball) =

American baseball player (born 1990)

- Pitcher
- Born: April 17, 1990 (age 36); Congers, New York, U.S.
- Batted: Left Threw: Left

MLB debut
- July 8, 2017, for the Miami Marlins

Last MLB appearance
- April 16, 2018, for the Miami Marlins

MLB statistics
- Win–loss record: 2–2
- Earned run average: 4.73
- Strikeouts: 38
- Stats at Baseball Reference

Teams
- Miami Marlins (2017–2018)

Christopher Ryan O'Grady (born April 17, 1990) is an American former professional baseball pitcher. He played in Major League Baseball (MLB) for the Miami Marlins.

== Career ==
O'Grady attended Clarkstown High School North in New City, New York, where he played baseball and American football. Playing as a quarterback, O'Grady tore three ligaments in his right knee, which resulted in his missing his senior season at Clarkstown North. He enrolled at George Mason University and played college baseball for the George Mason Patriots.

=== Los Angeles Angels ===
The Los Angeles Angels of Anaheim drafted O'Grady in the 10th round, with the 327th overall selection, of the 2012 Major League Baseball draft. In 2013, he split his first professional season between the rookie–level Orem Owlz and Single–A Burlington Bees, logging a cumulative 3–1 record and 2.18 ERA with 46 strikeouts in 24 games. O'Grady spent the entirety of 2014 with the High–A Inland Empire 66ers. In 45 appearances for the team, he compiled a 4–4 record and 3.33 ERA with 81 strikeouts and 5 saves over 83 2/3 innings pitched.

O'Grady split the 2015 campaign between the Double–A Arkansas Travelers and Triple–A Salt Lake Bees. In 45 appearances out of the bullpen for the two affiliates, he compiled an 0–5 record and 3.28 ERA with 57 strikeouts and 4 saves across 57 2/3 innings pitched. On December 10, 2015, the Cincinnati Reds selected O'Grady in the Rule 5 draft. On March 30, 2016, O'Grady was returned to the Angels after failing to make Cincinnati's Opening Day roster.

O'Grady split the 2016 campaign between the Double–A Arkansas Travelers and Triple–A Salt Lake Bees. In 37 appearances (10 starts) between the two affiliates, he compiled a 9–2 record and 3.29 ERA with 74 strikeouts across 95 2/3 innings pitched. O'Grady was released by the Angels organization on April 7, 2017.

=== Miami Marlins ===
On May 4, 2017, O'Grady signed a minor league contract with the Miami Marlins organization. The Marlins promoted him to the major leagues for the first time on July 8. In 13 games (6 starts) for the Marlins in his rookie campaign, O'Grady compiled a 4.36 ERA with 30 strikeouts across 33 innings of work.

O'Grady made 8 appearances for Miami in 2018, recording a 6.43 ERA with 8 strikeouts across 7 innings pitched. On October 12, 2018, he was removed from the 40-man roster and sent outright to the Triple–A New Orleans Baby Cakes. O'Grady elected free agency following the season on November 2.

== Personal life ==
O'Grady's older brother, T.J., also played college baseball for George Mason.

== See also ==
- Rule 5 draft results
