= Jharel Cotton =

American baseball player (born 1992)

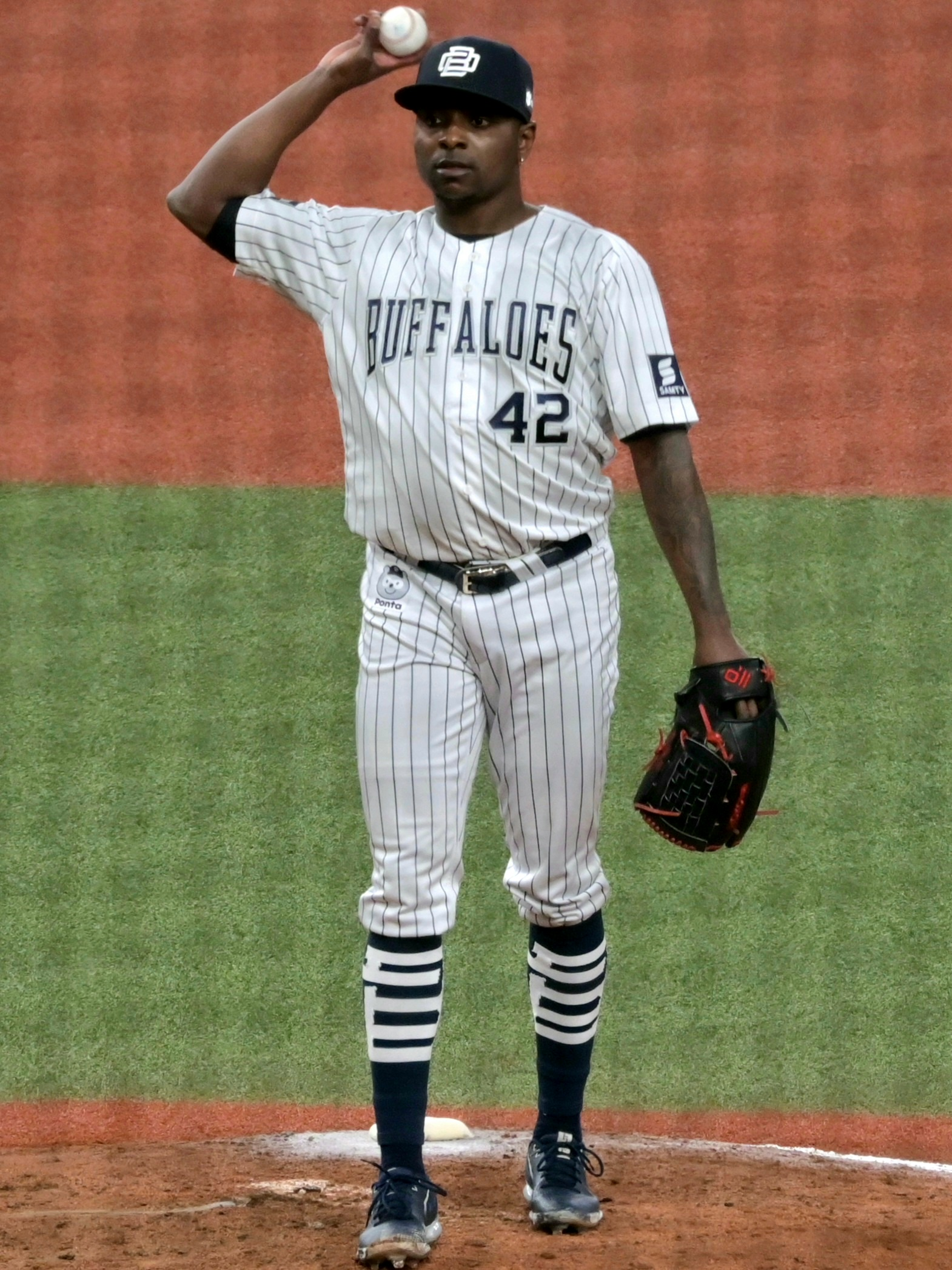
- Cotton with the Orix Buffaloes in 2023
- Pitcher
- Born: January 19, 1992 (age 34); Saint Thomas, U.S. Virgin Islands
- Batted: Right Threw: Right

Professional debut
- MLB: September 7, 2016, for the Oakland Athletics
- NPB: April 25, 2023, for the Orix Buffaloes

Last appearance
- MLB: October 4, 2022, for the San Francisco Giants
- NPB: August 2, 2023, for the Orix Buffaloes

MLB statistics
- Win–loss record: 17–12
- Earned run average: 4.50
- Strikeouts: 197

NPB statistics
- Win–loss record: 1–1
- Earned run average: 5.89
- Strikeouts: 22
- Stats at Baseball Reference

Teams
- Oakland Athletics (2016–2017); Texas Rangers (2021); Minnesota Twins (2022); San Francisco Giants (2022); Orix Buffaloes (2023)

Jharel Leandre Cotton (born January 19, 1992) is an American former professional baseball pitcher. He played in Major League Baseball (MLB) for the Oakland Athletics, Texas Rangers, Minnesota Twins, and San Francisco Giants, and in Nippon Professional Baseball (NPB) for the Orix Buffaloes. Cotton played college baseball at East Carolina University, and was drafted by the Los Angeles Dodgers in the 20th round of the 2012 MLB draft.

== College career ==
Cotton played college baseball at Miami Dade College in 2010 and 2011. After he was not taken in the 2010 Major League Baseball draft, the Los Angeles Dodgers offered him a contract as an undrafted free agent, but he declined the offer and returned to Miami-Dade. He was then drafted by the New York Mets in the 28th round of the 2011 MLB draft, but did not sign and transferred to East Carolina University.

== Professional career ==
=== Los Angeles Dodgers ===
After one year at East Carolina, Cotton was drafted by the Dodgers in the 20th round of the 2012 MLB draft. He signed this time and made his professional debut with the Ogden Raptors. Cotton spent 2013 with the Great Lakes Loons, Rancho Cucamonga Quakes and Double-A Chattanooga Lookouts. Cotton missed the first two months of the 2015 season, recovering from a broken left wrist. He pitched in one game for the Great Lakes and four for Rancho Cucamonga before being promoted to the Double-A Tulsa Drillers. In late August, he was promoted to the Triple-A Oklahoma City Dodgers and tried out for a potential bullpen callup to Los Angeles. Between the four levels, he appeared in 21 games (with 11 starts) and was 6–2 with a 2.45 ERA. The Dodgers added Cotton to their 40-man roster after the season. He began 2016 in the starting rotation for Oklahoma City, and was selected to participate for the world team at the 2016 All-Star Futures Game. During the game, Cotton only faced one batter, Phillies outfielder Dylan Cozens. Cozens flied out, and Cotton picked up the win after teammate Yoan Moncada hit a game-winning home run for the World Team.

=== Oakland Athletics ===
On August 1, 2016, the Dodgers traded Cotton, Grant Holmes, and Frankie Montas to the Oakland Athletics in exchange for Rich Hill and Josh Reddick. He was assigned to the Triple-A Nashville Sounds. Cotton retired the first 26 Round Rock Express batters he faced on August 9, but allowed a triple with two outs in the ninth inning, just missing a perfect game. He was called up to the Athletics on September 7 to make his major league debut. Cotton began the 2017 season in the A's rotation, but after starting off slowly, he was sent down to Triple-A. He was soon after called up again, but was sent down back to Triple-A. Cotton's splits between home and road were drastically apart, as at home he was 4–6 with 6.98 ERA while on the road he was 5–4 with a 3.94 ERA. On March 22, 2018, Cotton underwent Tommy John surgery and missed the 2018 season. In 2019, Cotton began his rehab by pitching for the Single-A Stockton Ports but was set back in May by a hamstring injury and elected to have surgery to resolve the issue. Cotton returned to the mound in July and pitched for the Triple-A Las Vegas Aviators.

Cotton was designated for assignment on November 20, 2019.

=== Chicago Cubs ===
On November 23, 2019, Cotton was traded to the Chicago Cubs in exchange for cash considerations. On August 16, 2020, Cotton was designated for assignment. He cleared waivers and was assigned to the team's alternate training site in South Bend, but was released by the organization on September 5.

=== Texas Rangers ===
On December 14, 2020, Cotton signed a minor league contract with the Texas Rangers organization. He began the 2021 campaign with the Triple-A Round Rock Express. On July 30, 2021, Texas selected Cotton's contract and promoted him to the active roster. Cotton finished the 2021 season with Texas, going 2–0 with a 3.52 ERA and 30 strikeouts over 30 2/3 innings.

=== Minnesota Twins ===
On November 5, 2021, Cotton was claimed off waivers by the Minnesota Twins. On November 30, Cotton signed a $700,000 contract with the Twins, avoiding salary arbitration.

Cotton made two scoreless appearances for the Twins in 2022 before he was designated for assignment on April 13, 2022, when Dereck Rodríguez was added to the roster. He cleared waivers and was sent outright to the Triple-A St. Paul Saints on April 20. Cotton was re-selected to the active roster on May 10, but designated for assignment on May 17 when Dylan Bundy was activated from the injured list. He cleared waivers and was sent outright to Triple-A on May 19. Furthermore, Cotton had his contract selected again on June 3, as a COVID-19 replacement player, and was returned to Triple-A on June 6. He had his contract selected for a third time on June 8. Cotton was designated for assignment again on August 2 in a flurry of transactions that followed the trade deadline. He cleared waivers and was again sent outright to St. Paul on August 5. Cotton had his contract selected for a fourth time on September 11. In 25 total appearances for the team, he compiled a 2-2 record and 2.83 ERA with 31 strikeouts across 35 innings pitched. On September 16, Cotton was designated for assignment after Bailey Ober was activated from the injured list.

=== San Francisco Giants ===
On September 18, 2022, Cotton was claimed off waivers by the San Francisco Giants. In 5 games for San Francisco, he logged a 2-0 record and 6.75 ERA with 8 strikeouts over 8 innings of work. On October 20, Cotton was removed from the 40-man roster and outright to the Triple-A Sacramento River Cats. However, he rejected the assignment and subsequently elected free agency the following day.

=== Orix Buffaloes ===
On December 19, 2022, Cotton signed with the Orix Buffaloes of Nippon Professional Baseball. In 7 games for the Buffaloes, he posted a 1-1 record and 5.89 ERA with 22 strikeouts across 18 1/3 innings pitched. Cotton became a free agent following the 2023 season.

== Personal life ==
His brother, Jamaine Cotton, pitched in the Houston Astros organization from 2010 to 2014.
