= Daniel Gossett =

American baseball player (born 1992)

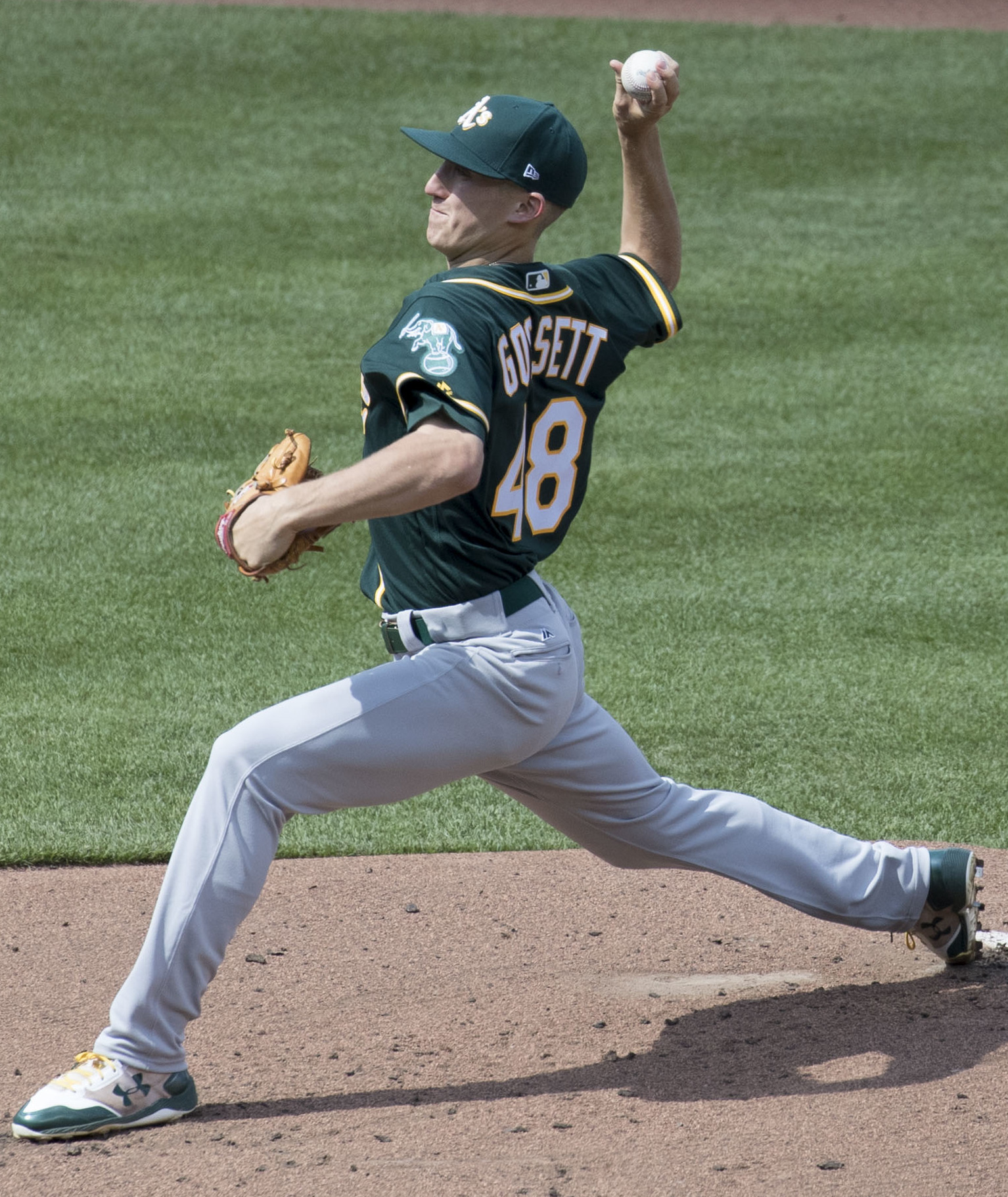
- Gossett with the Oakland Athletics
- Pitcher
- Born: November 13, 1992 (age 33); Lyman, South Carolina, U.S.
- Batted: Right Threw: Right

MLB debut
- June 14, 2017, for the Oakland Athletics

Last MLB appearance
- June 3, 2018, for the Oakland Athletics

MLB statistics
- Win–loss record: 4–14
- Earned run average: 5.91
- Strikeouts: 84
- Stats at Baseball Reference

Teams
- Oakland Athletics (2017–2018)

Daniel James Gossett (born November 13, 1992) is an American former professional baseball pitcher. He played for the Oakland Athletics of Major League Baseball (MLB).

== Career ==
Gossett attended James F. Byrnes High School in Duncan, South Carolina. He was drafted by the Boston Red Sox in the 16th round of the 2011 MLB draft. He did not sign with the Red Sox, deciding to play college baseball at Clemson University instead.

=== Oakland Athletics ===
After his junior year in college, Gossett was selected by the Oakland Athletics in the second round of the 2014 MLB draft.

Gossett made his professional debut with the Low–A Vermont Lake Monsters in 2014. He played in 12 games with a 2.25 earned run average (ERA) and 25 strikeouts. He pitched with the Single–A Beloit Snappers in 2015, ending with a 5–13 win–loss record, a 4.75 ERA, and 112 strikeouts. He started 2016 with the High–A Stockton Ports and was promoted to the Double-A Midland RockHounds and Triple-A Nashville Sounds during the season. He finished the 2016 campaign with a 10–6 record and a 2.69 ERA with 151 strikeouts.

Gossett began the 2017 season with Nashville, and was promoted to Oakland on June 14 to make his major league debut that day against the Miami Marlins. He pitched the remainder of the season with the A's, going 4–11 in 18 starts with an ERA of 6.11 in 91 1/3 innings. In 2018, he was limited to five starts and underwent Tommy John surgery on July 31. He missed the remainder of the 2018 season and all of the 2019 season. On July 23, 2020, Gossett was designated for assignment. He was released on July 27.

=== Boston Red Sox ===
On January 4, 2021, Gossett signed a minor league contract with the Red Sox organization. In 20 appearances (18 starts) with the Triple-A Worcester Red Sox, he pitched to a 4.22 ERA and 7–5 record while striking out 81 batters in 98 innings. He became a free agent following the season.

=== Minnesota Twins ===
On February 17, 2022, Gossett signed a minor league contract with the Minnesota Twins. On August 19, he threw the first no-hitter in Wichita Wind Surge history, defeating the Tulsa Drillers 3-0. In 27 games (16 starts) split between Double-A Wichita and the Triple-A St. Paul Saints, Gossett accumulated a 5-3 record and 4.32 ERA with 94 strikeouts across 100 innings pitched. He elected free agency following the season on November 10.
