= Michael Brady (baseball) =

American baseball player (born 1987)

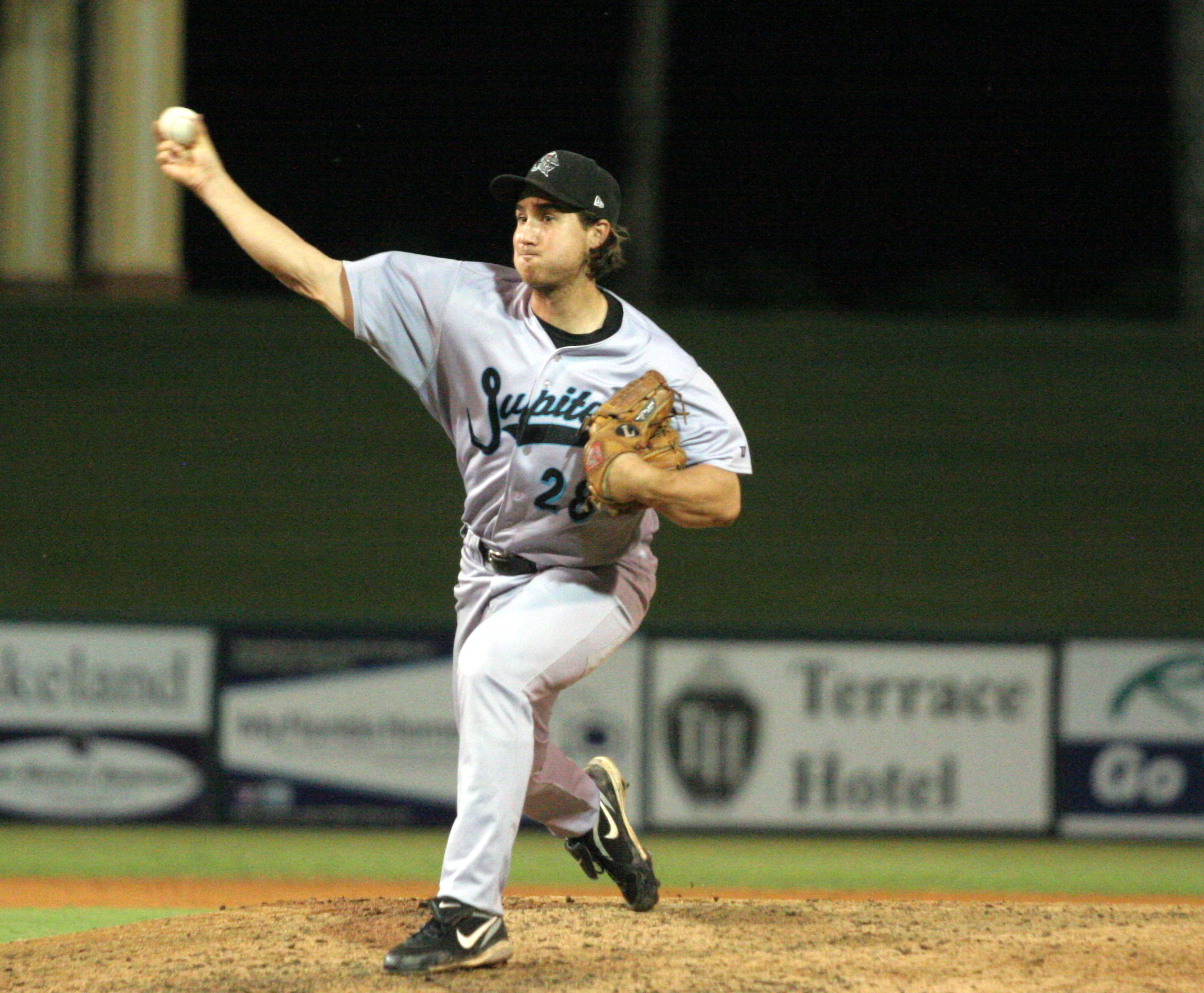
- Brady with the Jupiter Hammerheads in 2012
- Pitcher
- Born: March 21, 1987 (age 39); Laguna Beach, California, U.S.
- Batted: Right Threw: Right

MLB debut
- June 20, 2017, for the Oakland Athletics

Last MLB appearance
- September 30, 2017, for the Oakland Athletics

MLB statistics
- Win–loss record: 0–0
- Earned run average: 5.68
- Strikeouts: 24
- Stats at Baseball Reference

Teams
- Oakland Athletics (2017)

Michael James Brady (born March 21, 1987) is an American former professional baseball pitcher. He played in Major League Baseball (MLB) for the Oakland Athletics.

== Career ==
=== Florida Marlins ===
Brady attended Santa Margarita Catholic High School and after graduating, attended the University of California, Berkeley, and played for the California Golden Bears baseball team. He was drafted as a shortstop by the Florida Marlins in the 24th round of the 2009 Major League Baseball draft.

Brady made his professional debut with the Low–A Jamestown Jammers and, later, the rookie–level Gulf Coast League Marlins in 2009. Between the two teams, he played 8 games at third base and 3 games at second base.

He returned to the Jammers in 2010, but this time as a pitcher. In 49 games out of the bullpen, Brady accrued a 1–1 win–loss record with 3 saves and a 1.59 earned run average (ERA). He advanced to the Single–A Greensboro Grasshoppers and Double–A Jacksonville Suns in 2011. In 2012, he pitched for the Single–A Jupiter Hammerheads and also participated in the Arizona Fall League. His 2013 season was entirely spent at Double–A Jacksonville, where he went 2–2 with 23 saves and a 1.53 ERA.

On November 20, 2013, the Marlins added Brady to their 40-man roster to protect him from the Rule 5 draft. Brady was designated for assignment by the Marlins on March 30, 2014.

=== Los Angeles Angels ===
On April 2, 2014, Brady was claimed off waivers by the Los Angeles Angels. On June 6, he was removed from the 40–man roster and sent outright to the Double–A Arkansas Travelers. In 45 appearances split between Arkansas and the Triple–A Salt Lake Bees, Brady compiled a 1–6 record and 4.50 ERA with 63 strikeouts across 68 innings pitched.

=== Washington Nationals ===
On December 10, 2015, the Angels traded Brady and fellow pitcher Trevor Gott to the Washington Nationals in exchange for Yunel Escobar and cash considerations. The Nationals invited Brady to spring training as a non–roster invitee, and he started the 2016 campaign with the Triple–A Syracuse Chiefs, going back and forth between there and the Double–A Harrisburg Senators. In 18 games (12 starts) split between the two affiliates, Brady accumulated a 3–6 record and 2.89 ERA with 72 strikeouts across 81 innings pitched. He elected free agency following the season on November 7, 2016.

=== Oakland Athletics ===
Brady signed a minor league contract with the Oakland Athletics for 2017 that included an invitation to Spring Training. He was assigned to the Triple-A Nashville Sounds where he had a 3–1 record with 42 strikeouts and a 3.67 ERA through June 11.

He was called up by the Oakland Athletics on June 17 to work as a long-reliever out of the bullpen. He made his major league debut on June 20 pitching one inning of relief against the Houston Astros. He was outrighted to Triple-A on November 5, 2017, and then elected to become a free agent.

=== Milwaukee Brewers ===
On November 27, 2017, Brady signed a minor league contract with the Milwaukee Brewers. In 33 appearances for the Triple–A Colorado Springs Sky Sox, he struggled to a 6.91 ERA with 46 strikeouts across 54 2/3 innings pitched. Brady elected free agency following the season on November 2, 2018.
