= 2018 New York Mets season =

2018 New York Mets
- League: National League
- Division: East
- Ballpark: Citi Field
- City: New York City, New York
- Record: 77–85 (.475)
- Divisional place: 4th
- Owners: Fred Wilpon
- General manager: Sandy Alderson
- Manager: Mickey Callaway
- Television: SportsNet New York; PIX 11 (CW affiliate) (Gary Cohen, Ron Darling, Keith Hernandez)
- Radio: WOR Radio 710 AM (English); New York Mets Radio Network (Howie Rose, Josh Lewin, Wayne Randazzo); Que Buena 92.7 (Spanish) (Juan Alicea, Max Perez Jiminez)

The 2018 New York Mets season was the franchise's 57th season and the team's 10th season at Citi Field. They attempted to return to the postseason after an injury-plagued under-performance in 2017. This was their first season with Mickey Callaway as manager, succeeding Terry Collins. It was also notable for being the final season of former Mets third baseman and team captain David Wright.

The Mets got off to a franchise record 11–1 start and ended the month of April with a 17–9 record, in first place in the National League East. However, they went 61–76 the rest of the way, and were eliminated from playoff contention by mid-September. The Mets finished with a 77–85 record and 4th place in the NL East.

== Spring training ==
The Mets had a rough spring training with a record of 7–15–3 (ties). They ended the spring by winning an exhibition game 3–1 over the Las Vegas 51s.

== Regular season ==
=== March ===
The Mets began the regular season on March 29, 2018, with their home opener with a 9–4 win over the St. Louis Cardinals at Citi Field in Queens, New York. They ended up winning the first two games of the season.

=== April ===
On April 1, the Mets started the month losing 1–5 to the St. Louis Cardinals, finishing the series two out of three. After, they went on a 9–game win streak, which put them in first place in the NL East. They finished the month going 15–9 and having a strong win (14–2) over the San Diego Padres.

=== May ===
On May 1, the Mets started the month losing 3-2 to the Atlanta Braves at Citi Field. They went on a 6–game losing streak, but broke out of it seven days later by beating the Cincinnati Reds 7–6. The one highlight of the month was a three–game sweep of the Arizona Diamondbacks. However, the remaining weeks didn't fare well.

=== June ===
The Mets started the month continuing their losing streak when the Chicago Cubs swept them in four games. They snapped their 8–game losing streak by beating their crosstown rival New York Yankees 2–0 in the last game of the three-game Subway Series, handing the Bronx Bombers their first shutout loss of the season. The Mets finished the month 5–21, second to last place in the NL East behind their division rivals, the Miami Marlins, losing the first two games of the series to them.

=== July ===
The Mets started the month winning the last game of the series with the Miami Marlins by a score of 5–2. The team set a franchise record on July 31 for their worst loss ever, suffering a 25–4 defeat against the Washington Nationals.

=== August ===
The Mets started the month continuing their loss from last month in a two game set to the Washington Nationals. The team also lost two in a row to the Atlanta Braves, however, they snapped their three game losing streak with a 3–0 shutout win in the next game against their rivals. A day after trouncing the Baltimore Orioles 16–5, on August 16, the Mets went on another tear and set a franchise record by scoring 24 runs in a win over the division rival Philadelphia Phillies; the final score was 24–4. They went on to win 3 out of 5 games. The highlight of the series, the Mets beat the Phillies 8–2 in the second annual Little League Classic at Bowman Field in Williamsport, Pennsylvania. The month ended with the Mets losing against the San Francisco Giants 7–0, finishing August with equal wins and losses at 15–15.

=== September ===
The Mets started the month with taking two out of three games against the San Francisco Giants. After that, they took two of three games from the Los Angeles Dodgers and Philadelphia Phillies, thus spoiling their playoff hopes. They also clinched their 7th straight season with a winning record against the Phillies, one short of a major league record, in that series. The Mets then played a rainy four-game series against the last-place Miami Marlins managing to win three out of four; the one loss by the NL Cy Young candidate Jacob deGrom. DeGrom pitched 7 innings and gave up two runs making his current ERA 1.71, but José Ureña outdueled him.

They would then begin a three-game series with the Boston Red Sox, winning the first game 8–0. However, they lost the next two games of the series. After losing another two of three games against the Phillies at home, the Mets traveled to Washington to start a four-game series against the Washington Nationals, taking three out of four in the series. However, they were eliminated from playoff contention for the second straight season after a 6–0 loss to the Nationals on September 22. The Mets then traveled back home to take two of three against the Atlanta Braves, and began the final series of the season against the Marlins.

After an 8–1 loss in the series opener, former Mets team captain and third baseman David Wright played the final game of his career on the following day. He batted 0-for-1 with a walk and fielded one ground ball before being removed in the fifth inning to a lengthy ovation by many Mets fans and players alike. The Mets went on to win 1–0 in the 13th inning from a walk-off double by Austin Jackson. Overall, the Mets took two out of three from the Marlins as they also won the next game 1–0, a complete game shutout by Noah Syndergaard. The Mets finished with a record of 77–85 and 4th place in the National League East, sealing their second losing season in two years.

== Season standings ==
=== National League East ===
NL East
Team	W	L	Pct.	GB	Home	Road
Atlanta Braves	90	72	.556	—	43‍–‍38	47‍–‍34
Washington Nationals	82	80	.506	8	41‍–‍40	41‍–‍40
Philadelphia Phillies	80	82	.494	10	49‍–‍32	31‍–‍50
New York Mets	77	85	.475	13	37‍–‍44	40‍–‍41
Miami Marlins	63	98	.391	26½	38‍–‍43	25‍–‍55

=== National League division leaders ===
Division leaders
Team	W	L	Pct.
Milwaukee Brewers	96	67	.589
Los Angeles Dodgers	92	71	.564
Atlanta Braves	90	72	.556

Wild Card teams (Top 2 teams qualify for postseason)
Team	W	L	Pct.	GB
Chicago Cubs	95	68	.583	+4
Colorado Rockies	91	72	.558	—
St. Louis Cardinals	88	74	.543	2½
Pittsburgh Pirates	82	79	.509	8
Arizona Diamondbacks	82	80	.506	8½
Washington Nationals	82	80	.506	8½
Philadelphia Phillies	80	82	.494	10½
New York Mets	77	85	.475	13½
San Francisco Giants	73	89	.451	17½
Cincinnati Reds	67	95	.414	23½
San Diego Padres	66	96	.407	24½
Miami Marlins	63	98	.391	27

=== Record vs. opponents ===
2018 National League record Source: MLB Standings Grid – 2018
Team	AZ	ATL	CHC	CIN	COL	LAD	MIA	MIL	NYM	PHI	PIT	SD	SF	STL	WSH	AL
Arizona	—	3–4	3–4	3–3	8–11	11–8	6–1	1–5	2–5	4–2	6–1	12–7	8–11	3–3	2–5	10–10
Atlanta	4–3	—	3–3	3–4	2–5	2–5	14–5	3–4	13–6	12–7	5–1	4–3	3–3	4–2	10–9	8–12
Chicago	4–3	3–3	—	11–8	3–3	4–3	5–2	11–9	6–1	4–2	10–9	5–2	3–3	9–10	4–3	13–7
Cincinnati	3–3	4–3	8–11	—	2–4	6–1	2–5	6–13	3–3	3–4	5–14	3–4	4–2	7–12	1–6	10–10
Colorado	11–8	5–2	3–3	4–2	—	7–13	2–4	2–5	6–1	5–2	3–3	11–8	12–7	2–5	5–2	13–7
Los Angeles	8–11	5–2	3–4	1–6	13–7	—	2–4	4–3	4–2	3–4	5–1	14–5	10–9	3–4	5–1	12–8
Miami	1–6	5–14	2–5	5–2	4–2	4–2	—	2–5	7–12	8–11	1–4	2–5	4–3	3–3	6–13	9–11
Milwaukee	5–1	4–3	9–11	13–6	5–2	3–4	5–2	—	4–3	3–3	7–12	4–2	6–1	11–8	4–2	13–7
New York	5–2	6–13	1–6	3–3	1–6	2–4	12–7	3–4	—	11–8	3–4	4–2	4–3	3–3	11–8	8–12
Philadelphia	2–4	7–12	2–4	4–3	2–5	4–3	11–8	3–3	8–11	—	6–1	3–3	4–3	4–3	8–11	12–8
Pittsburgh	1–6	1–5	9–10	14–5	3–3	1–5	4–1	12–7	4–3	1–6	—	3–4	4–3	8–11	2–5	15–5
San Diego	7–12	3–4	2–5	4–3	8–11	5–14	5–2	2–4	2–4	3–3	4–3	—	8–11	4–3	2–4	7–13
San Francisco	11–8	3–3	3–3	2–4	7–12	9–10	3–4	1–6	3–4	3–4	3–4	11–8	—	2–5	4–2	8–12
St. Louis	3–3	2–4	10–9	12–7	5–2	4–3	3–3	8–11	3–3	3–4	11–8	3–4	5–2	—	5–2	11–9
Washington	5–2	9–10	3–4	6–1	2–5	1–5	13–6	2–4	8–11	11–8	5–2	4–2	2–4	2–5	—	9–11

The October 1 tiebreaker games were regular-season games that are included here.

== Detailed records ==
National League
Opponent	Home	Away	Total	Pct.
NL East
Atlanta Braves	3-6	3-7	6-13	.316
Miami Marlins	6-4	6–3	12-7	.632
New York Mets	-	-	-	
Philadelphia Phillies	6-3	5-5*	11-8	.579
Washington Nationals	5-5	6-3	11-8	.579
	20-19	20-17	40-36	.606
NL Central
Milwaukee Brewers	2-1	1-3	3-4	.429
Chicago Cubs	0-4	1-2	1-6	.143
Cincinnati Reds	2-1	1-2	3-3	.500
Pittsburgh Pirates	1-2	2-2	3-4	.429
St. Louis Cardinals	2-1	1-2	3-3	.500
	7–9	6–11	12–20	.375
NL West
Arizona Diamondbacks	3–0	2–2	5–2	.714
Colorado Rockies	0-3	1–3	1–6	.143
Los Angeles Dodgers	0-3	2–1	2–4	.333
San Diego Padres	2–1	2–1	4–2	.667
San Francisco Giants	2–2	2–1	4–3	.571
	7–9	11–10	18–19	.486

American League
Opponent	Home	Away	Total	Pct.
Boston Red Sox	—	1–2	1–2	.333
New York Yankees	1–2	2–1	3–3	.500
Tampa Bay Rays	1–2	—	1–2	.333
Toronto Blue Jays	1–1	1–1	2–2	.500
Baltimore Orioles	0–2	1–1	1–3	.250
	3–7	5–5	8–12	.400

- = The 2018 MLB Little League Classic was a Phillies home game, and the Mets won 8–2.

== Roster ==
2018 New York Mets
Roster
Pitchers: 49 Tyler Bashlor; 77 Buddy Baumann; 46 Gerson Bautista; 61 Chris Beck; 39 Jerry Blevins; 60 P. J. Conlon; 62 Scott Copeland; 48 Jacob deGrom; 27 Jeurys Familia; 64 Chris Flexen; 47 Drew Gagnon; 65 Robert Gsellman; 70 Eric Hanhold; 33 Matt Harvey; 67 Seth Lugo; 32 Steven Matz; 55 Corey Oswalt; 63 Tim Peterson; 44 A. J. Ramos; 35 Jacob Rhame; 47 Hansel Robles; 51 Paul Sewald; 62 Drew Smith; 38 Anthony Swarzak; 34 Noah Syndergaard; 40 Jason Vargas; 61 Bobby Wahl; 45 Zack Wheeler; 73 Daniel Zamora	Catchers: 18 Travis d'Arnaud; 59 José Lobatón; 29 Devin Mesoraco; 3 Tomas Nido; 26 Kevin Plawecki; Infielders: 13 Asdrúbal Cabrera; 28 Phillip Evans; 4 Wilmer Flores; 21 Todd Frazier; 23 Adrián González; 15 Luis Guillorme; 66 Ty Kelly; 68 Jeff McNeil; 7 José Reyes; 1 Amed Rosario; 22 Dominic Smith; 5 David Wright	Outfielders: 11 José Bautista; 19 Jay Bruce; 52 Yoenis Céspedes; 30 Michael Conforto; 23 Matt den Dekker; 16 Austin Jackson; 16 Kevin Kaczmarski; 12 Juan Lagares; 9 Brandon Nimmo; 72 Jack Reinheimer	Manager: 36 Mickey Callaway; Coaches: 20 Rubén Amaro Jr. (first base); 25 Ricky Bones (bullpen); 10 Gary DiSarcina (bench/infield); 58 Dave Eiland (pitching); 78 Eric Langill (bullpen catcher); 57 Dave Racaniello (bullpen catcher); 6 Pat Roessler (hitting); 53 Glenn Sherlock (third base/catching); 56 Tom Slater (assistant hitting)

== Player stats ==
=== Batting ===
Note: G = Games played; AB = At bats; R = Runs; H = Hits; 2B = Doubles; 3B = Triples; HR = Home runs; RBI = Runs batted in; SB = Stolen bases; BB = Walks; AVG = Batting average; SLG = Slugging average

Player	G	AB	R	H	2B	3B	HR	RBI	SB	BB	AVG	SLG
Amed Rosario	154	554	76	142	26	8	9	51	24	29	.256	.381
Michael Conforto	153	543	78	132	25	1	28	82	3	84	.243	.448
Brandon Nimmo	140	433	77	114	28	8	17	47	9	80	.263	.483
Todd Frazier	115	408	54	87	18	0	18	59	9	48	.213	.390
Wilmer Flores	126	386	43	103	25	0	11	51	0	29	.267	.417
Asdrúbal Cabrera	98	375	48	104	23	1	18	58	0	29	.277	.488
Jay Bruce	94	319	31	71	18	1	9	37	2	41	.223	.370
José Bautista	83	245	37	50	13	0	9	37	2	51	.204	.367
Kevin Plawecki	79	238	33	50	13	2	7	30	0	28	.210	.370
José Reyes	110	228	30	43	12	3	4	16	5	22	.189	.320
Jeff McNeil	63	225	35	74	11	6	3	19	7	14	.329	.471
Devin Mesoraco	66	203	23	45	8	0	10	30	0	23	.222	.409
Austin Jackson	57	198	17	49	9	1	3	19	1	12	.247	.348
Adrián González	54	169	15	40	5	0	6	26	0	15	.237	.373
Dominic Smith	56	143	14	32	11	1	5	11	0	4	.224	.420
Yoenis Céspedes	38	141	20	37	6	0	9	29	3	13	.262	.496
Tomas Nido	34	84	10	14	3	0	1	9	0	4	.167	.238
Luis Guillorme	35	67	4	14	2	0	0	5	1	7	.209	.239
Juan Lagares	30	59	9	20	1	1	0	6	3	3	.339	.390
José Lobatón	22	49	3	7	2	1	0	4	0	7	.143	.224
Jack Reinheimer	21	30	4	5	0	0	0	0	1	5	.167	.167
Phillip Evans	15	21	1	3	0	0	0	1	1	2	.143	.143
Matt den Dekker	8	18	0	0	0	0	0	1	0	2	.000	.000
Travis d'Arnaud	4	15	1	3	0	0	1	3	0	1	.200	.400
Ty Kelly	9	11	1	1	0	0	0	0	0	1	.091	.091
Kevin Kaczmarski	4	4	0	0	0	0	0	0	0	1	.000	.000
David Wright	2	2	0	0	0	0	0	0	0	1	.000	.000
Pitcher totals	162	300	12	42	6	0	2	18	0	10	.140	.180
Team totals	162	5468	676	1282	265	34	170	649	71	566	.234	.389

=== Pitching ===
Note: W = Wins; L = Losses; ERA = Earned run average; G = Games pitched; GS = Games started; SV = Saves; IP = Innings pitched; H = Hits allowed; R = Runs allowed; ER = Earned runs allowed; BB = Walks allowed; SO = Strikeouts

Player	W	L	ERA	G	GS	SV	IP	H	R	ER	BB	SO
Jacob deGrom	10	9	1.70	32	32	0	217.0	152	48	41	46	269
Zach Wheeler	12	7	3.31	29	29	0	182.1	150	69	67	55	179
Noah Syndergaard	13	4	3.03	25	25	0	154.1	148	55	52	39	155
Steven Matz	5	11	3.97	30	30	0	154.0	134	77	68	58	152
Seth Lugo	3	4	2.66	54	5	3	101.1	81	36	30	28	103
Jason Vargas	7	9	5.77	20	20	0	92.0	100	60	59	30	84
Robert Gsellman	6	3	4.28	68	0	13	80.0	76	44	38	28	70
Corey Oswalt	3	3	5.85	17	12	0	64.2	69	43	42	20	45
Paul Sewald	0	7	6.07	46	0	2	56.1	62	39	38	23	58
Jerry Blevins	3	2	4.85	64	1	1	42.2	36	24	23	22	41
Jeurys Familia	4	4	2.88	40	0	17	40.2	36	13	13	14	43
Jacob Rhame	1	2	5.85	30	0	1	32.1	38	21	21	8	28
Tyler Bashlor	0	3	4.22	24	0	0	32.0	26	16	15	12	25
Drew Smith	1	1	3.54	27	0	0	28.0	34	11	11	6	18
Tim Peterson	2	2	6.18	22	0	0	27.2	29	19	19	5	25
Matt Harvey	0	2	7.00	8	4	0	27.0	33	21	21	9	20
Anthony Swarzak	0	2	6.15	29	0	4	26.1	28	18	18	14	31
A. J. Ramos	2	2	6.41	28	0	0	19.2	17	14	14	15	22
Hansel Robles	2	2	5.03	16	0	0	19.2	21	11	11	10	23
Drew Gagnon	2	1	5.25	5	1	0	12.0	15	11	7	5	8
Chris Beck	0	0	5.23	6	0	0	10.1	10	6	6	9	5
Daniel Zamora	1	0	3.00	16	0	0	9.0	6	3	3	3	16
P. J. Conlon	0	0	8.22	3	2	0	7.2	15	7	7	2	5
Chris Flexen	0	2	12.79	4	1	0	6.1	14	13	9	6	3
Bobby Wahl	0	1	10.13	7	0	0	5.1	9	6	6	4	7
Gerson Bautista	0	1	12.46	5	0	0	4.1	8	6	6	5	3
Buddy Baumann	0	1	24.00	3	0	0	3.0	7	8	8	5	4
Eric Hanhold	0	0	7.71	3	0	0	2.1	4	2	2	1	2
Scott Copeland	0	0	0.00	1	0	0	1.1	1	0	0	0	2
José Reyes	0	0	54.00	1	0	0	1.0	5	6	6	2	0
Team totals	77	85	4.07	162	162	41	1460.2	1364	707	661	484	1446

== Game log ==
Legend
	Mets win
	Mets loss
	Postponement
**Bold**	Mets team member

2018 game log: 77–85 (Home: 37–44; Away: 40–41)
March: 2–0 (Home: 2–0; Away: 0–0)

#	Date	Opponent	Score	Win	Loss	Save	Stadium	Attendance	Record
1	March 29	Cardinals	9–4	**Syndergaard** (1–0)	Martinez (0–1)	—	**Citi Field**	44,189	1–0
2	March 31	Cardinals	6–2	**deGrom** (1–0)	Wacha (0–1)	**Familia** (1)	**Citi Field**	36,098	2–0

April: 15–9 (Home: 5–4; Away: 10–5)

#	Date	Opponent	Score	Win	Loss	Save	Stadium	Attendance	Record
3	April 1	Cardinals	1–5	Weaver (1–0)	**Matz** (0–1)	—	**Citi Field**	22,468	2–1
—	April 2	Phillies	Postponed (inclement weather: snow). Makeup date: July 9						
4	April 3	Phillies	2–0	**Blevins** (1–0)	Lively (0–1)	**Familia** (2)	**Citi Field**	21,397	3–1
5	April 4	Phillies	4–2	**Gsellman** (1–0)	Hutchinson (1–1)	**Familia** (3)	**Citi Field**	21,328	4–1
6	April 5	@ Nationals	8–2	**deGrom** (2–0)	Strasburg (1–1)	—	Nationals Park	42,477	5–1
7	April 7	@ Nationals	3–2	**Robles** (1–0)	Kintzler (0–1)	**Familia** (4)	Nationals Park	28,952	6–1
8	April 8	@ Nationals	6–5 (12)	**Lugo** (1–0)	Kintzler (0–2)	**Rhame** (1)	Nationals Park	21,579	7–1
9	April 9	@ Marlins	4–2	**Syndergaard** (2–0)	Ureña (0–2)	**Familia** (5)	Marlins Park	7,003	8–1
10	April 10	@ Marlins	8–6	**Robles** (2–0)	Ziegler (0–2)	**Familia** (6)	Marlins Park	6,516	9–1
11	April 11	@ Marlins	4–1	**Wheeler** (1–0)	O'Grady (0–1)	—	Marlins Park	6,150	10–1
12	April 13	Brewers	6–5	**Matz** (1–1)	Davies (0–2)	**Familia** (7)	**Citi Field**	34,921	11–1
13	April 14	Brewers	1–5	Anderson (1–1)	**Harvey** (0–1)	Hader (1)	**Citi Field**	40,965	11–2
14	April 15	Brewers	3–2	**Familia** (1–0)	Albers (2–1)	—	**Citi Field**	26,035	12–2
15	April 16	Nationals	6–8	Cole (1–1)	**Ramos** (0–1)	Madson (2)	**Citi Field**	22,829	12–3
16	April 17	Nationals	2–5	Gonzalez (2–1)	**Wheeler** (1–1)	Doolittle (3)	**Citi Field**	22,724	12–4
17	April 18	Nationals	11–5	**Ramos** (1–1)	Madson (0–2)	—	**Citi Field**	23,117	13–4
18	April 19	@ Braves	4–12	Wisler (1–0)	**Harvey** (0–2)	—	SunTrust Park	23,610	13–5
19	April 20	@ Braves	5–3 (12)	**Gsellman** (2–0)	Ravin (0–1)	**Familia**	SunTrust Park	39,016	14–5
20	April 21	@ Braves	3–4	Biddle (1–0)	**Familia** (1–1)	—	SunTrust Park	41,396	14–6
—	April 22	@ Braves	Postponed (inclement weather). Makeup date: May 28, double header						
21	April 24	@ Cardinals	6–5	**Gsellman** (3–0)	Bowman (0–1)	**Familia** (9)	Busch Stadium	36,237	15–6
22	April 25	@ Cardinals	1–9	Wacha (4–1)	**Matz** (1–2)	Brebbia (1)	Busch Stadium	38,045	15–7
23	April 26	@ Cardinals	3–4 (13)	Gant (1–0)	**Sewald** (0–1)	—	Busch Stadium	37,762	15–8
24	April 27	@ Padres	5–1	**deGrom** (3–0)	Richard (1–3)	—	Petco Park	29,997	16–8
25	April 28	@ Padres	2–12	Lucchesi (3–1)	**Vargas** (0–1)	—	Petco Park	42,778	16–9
26	April 29	@ Padres	14–2	**Wheeler** (2–1)	Mitchell (0–3)	—	Petco Park	34,639	17–9

May: 10–18 (Home: 5–11; Away: 5–7)

#	Date	Opponent	Score	Win	Loss	Save	Stadium	Attendance	Record
27	May 1	Braves	2–3	Soroka (1–0)	**Syndergaard** (2–1)	Vizcaíno (4)	**Citi Field**	22,527	17–10
28	May 2	Braves	0–7	Newcomb (2–1)	**Sewald** (0–2)	—	**Citi Field**	23,528	17–11
29	May 3	Braves	0–11	Teherán (2–1)	**Vargas** (0–2)	—	**Citi Field**	26,882	17–12
30	May 4	Rockies	7–8	Márquez (2–3)	**Wheeler** (2–2)	Davis (12)	**Citi Field**	34,030	17–13
31	May 5	Rockies	0–2	Bettis (4–1)	**Matz** (1–3)	Davis (13)	**Citi Field**	37,550	17–14
32	May 6	Rockies	2–3	Freeland (2–4)	**Robles** (2–1)	Ottavino (1)	**Citi Field**	33,580	17–15
33	May 7	@ Reds	7–6	**Gsellman** (4–0)	Bailey (0–5)	**Familia** (10)	Great American Ball Park	15,187	18–15
34	May 8	@ Reds	2–7	Castillo (2–4)	**Vargas** (0–3)	—	Great American Ballpark	14,804	18–16
35	May 9	@ Reds	1–2 (10)	Iglesias (1–0)	**Ramos** (1–2)	—	Great American Ballpark	16,452	18–17
36	May 11	@ Phillies	3–1	**Ramos** (2–2)	Neris (1–3)	**Familia** (11)	Citizens Bank Park	29,247	19–17
–	May 12	@ Phillies	Postponed (inclement weather). Make up date: August 16, double header						
37	May 13	@ Phillies	2–4	Nola (6–1)	**Sewald** (0–3)	Ramos (1)	Citizens Bank Park	34,091	19–18
38	May 15	Blue Jays	12–2	**Syndergaard** (3–1)	García (2–3)	—	**Citi Field**	28,967	20–18
39	May 16	Blue Jays	1–12	Happ (5–3)	**Wheeler** (2–3)	—	**Citi Field**	28,400	20–19
40	May 18	Diamondbacks	3–1	**deGrom** (4–0)	Godley (4–3)	**Familia** (12)	**Citi Field**	31,285	21–19
41	May 19	Diamondbacks	5–4	**Familia** (2–1)	Chafin (0–1)	—	**Citi Field**	39,515	22–19
42	May 20	Diamondbacks	4–1	**Syndergaard** (4–1)	De La Rosa (1–0)	**Gsellman** (1)	**Citi Field**	34,894	23–19
43	May 21	Marlins	2–0	**Vargas** (1–3)	Hernandez (0–1)	**Familia** (13)	**Citi Field**	22,505	24–19
44	May 22	Marlins	1–5	Smith (3–5)	**Wheeler** (2–4)	—	**Citi Field**	22,195	24–20
45	May 23	Marlins	1–2	Conley (1–0)	**Familia** (2–2)	Ziegler (9)	**Citi Field**	24,808	24–21
46	May 24	@ Brewers	5–0	**Matz** (2–3)	Davies (2–4)	—	Miller Park	33,803	25–21
47	May 25	@ Brewers	3–4 (10)	Jeffress (4–0)	**Gsellman** (4–1)	—	Miller Park	28,286	25–22
48	May 26	@ Brewers	6–17	Jennings (3–1)	**Rhame** (0–1)	—	Miller Park	37,258	25–23
49	May 27	@ Brewers	7–8	Logan (1–0)	**Blevins** (1–1)	Jnebel (4)	Miller Park	39,715	25–24
50	May 28	@ Braves	3–4	Carle (3–1)	**Lugo** (1–1)	—	SunTrust Park	32,377	25–25
51	May 28	@ Braves	8–5	**Gsellman** (5–1)	Minter (3–1)	**Familia** (14)	SunTrust Park	31,779	26–25
52	May 29	@ Braves	6–7	Winkler (2–0)	**Bautista** (0–1)	—	SunTrust Park	19,443	26–26
53	May 30	@ Braves	4–1	**Vargas** (2–3)	Teherán (4–3)	**Gsellman** (2)	SunTrust Park	21,449	27–26
54	May 31	Cubs	1–5	Quintana (6–4)	**Robles (2–2)**	Morrow (13)	**Citi Field**	34,458	27–27

June: 5–21 (Home: 2–12; Away: 3–9)

#	Date	Opponent	Score	Win	Loss	Save	Stadium	Attendance	Record
55	June 1	Cubs	4–7	Rosario (2–0)	**Sewald** (0–4)	Morrow (14)	**Citi Field**	37,458	27–28
56	June 2	Cubs	1–7 (14)	Farrell (2–2)	**Baumann** (0–2)	—	**Citi Field**	32,817	27–29
57	June 3	Cubs	0–2	Lester (6–2)	**Matz** (2–4)	Duensing (1)	**Citi Field**	34,946	27–30
58	June 5	Orioles	1–2	Cobb (2–7)	**Vargas** (2–4)	Brach (9)	**Citi Field**	25,342	27–31
59	June 6	Orioles	0–1	Bundy (4–7)	**Familia** (2–3)	Brach (10)	**Citi Field**	30,366	27–32
60	June 8	Yankees	1–4	Green (4–0)	**deGrom** (4–1)	Chapman (16)	**Citi Field**	42,961	27–33
61	June 9	Yankees	3–4	Robertson (5–2)	**Swarzak** (0–1)	Chapman (17)	**Citi Field**	43,603	27–34
62	June 10	Yankees	2–0	**Lugo** (2–1)	Severino (9–2)	**Swarzak** (1)	**Citi Field**	36,171	28–34
63	June 12	@ Braves	2–8	Carle (4–1)	**Wheeler** (2–5)	—	SunTrust Park	29,892	28–35
64	June 13	@ Braves	0–2	Soroka (2–1)	**deGrom** (4–2)	Vizcaíno (12)	SunTrust Park	32,015	28–36
65	June 14	@ Diamondbacks	3–6	Koch (5–3)	**Vargas** (2–5)	Boxberger (15)	Chase Field	23,300	28–37
66	June 15	@ Diamondbacks	3–7	Godley (7–5)	**Lugo** (2–2)	Boxberger (16)	Chase Field	32,170	28–38
67	June 16	@ Diamondbacks	5–1	**Matz** (3–4)	Corbin (6–3)	—	Chase Field	31,824	29–38
68	June 17	@ Diamondbacks	5–3	**Familia** (3–3)	Boxberger (1–3)	**Gsellman** (3)	Chase Field	47,907	30–38
69	June 18	@ Rockies	12–2	**deGrom** (5–2)	Anderson (4–2)	—	Coors Field	33,815	31–38
70	June 19	@ Rockies	8–10	Márquez (5–7)	**Vargas** (2–6)	—	Coors Field	29,710	31–39
71	June 20	@ Rockies	8–10	Shaw (3–5)	**Gsellman** (5–2)	Davis (21)	Coors Field	38,685	31–40
72	June 21	@ Rockies	4–6	Freeland (7–6)	**Matz** (3–5)	McGee (1)	Coors Field	44,010	31–41
73	June 22	Dodgers	2–5	Wood (3–5)	**Wheeler** (2–6)	Jansen (19)	**Citi Field**	32,565	31–42
74	June 23	Dodgers	3–8	Ferguson (1–1)	**deGrom** (5–3)	—	**Citi Field**	37,705	31–43
75	June 24	Dodgers	7–8 (11)	Hudson (2–2)	**Flexen** (0–1)	—	**Citi Field**	34,060	31–44
76	June 25	Pirates	4–6	Taillon (5–6)	**Lugo** (2–3)	Vázquez (15)	**Citi Field**	22,135	31–45
77	June 26	Pirates	4–3	**Peterson** (1–0)	Brault (5–2)	—	**Citi Field**	24,501	32–45
78	June 27	Pirates	3–5	Vázquez (3–2)	**Familia** (3–4)	—	**Citi Field**	24,506	32–46
79	June 29	@ Marlins	2–8	Alcantara (1–0)	**Oswalt** (0–1)	—	Marlins Park	8,211	32–47
80	June 30	@ Marlins	2–5	Lopez (1–0)	**deGrom** (5–4)	Barraclough (8)	Marlins Park	10,523	32–48

July: 12–12 (Home: 7–7; Away: 5–5)

#	Date	Opponent	Score	Win	Loss	Save	Stadium	Attendance	Record
81	July 1	@ Marlins	5–2	**Matz** (4–5)	Straily (3–4)	**Familia** (15)	Marlins Park	9,611	33–48
82	July 3	@ Blue Jays	6–8	Axford (2–1)	**Peterson** (1–1)	Clippard (6)	Rogers Centre	24,010	33–49
83	July 4	@ Blue Jays	6–3	**Lugo** (3–3)	Stroman (1–6)	**Familia** (16)	Rogers Centre	26,038	34–49
84	July 6	Rays	5–1	**Familia** (4–4)	Roe (1–2)	—	**Citi Field**	24,236	35–49
85	July 7	Rays	0–3	Snell (12–4)	**Matz** (4–6)	Romo (9)	**Citi Field**	32,986	35–50
86	July 8	Rays	0–9	Eovaldi (3–3)	**Flexen** (0–2)	—	**Citi Field**	24,653	35–51
87	July 9 (1)	Phillies	4–3 (10)	**Peterson** (2–1)	Arano (1–1)	—	**Citi Field**	—	36–51
88	July 9 (2)	Phillies	1–3	Nola (12–2)	**Oswalt** (0–2)	Arano (3)	**Citi Field**	24,139	36–52
89	July 10	Phillies	3–7	Del Los Santos (1–0)	**Gagnon** (0–1)	—	**Citi Field**	22,416	36–53
90	July 11	Phillies	3–0 (10)	**Gsellman** (6–2)	Leiter (0–1)	—	**Citi Field**	22,137	37–53
91	July 12	Nationals	4–5	Scherzer (12–5)	**Matz** (4–7)	Madson (4)	**Citi Field**	28,120	37–54
92	July 13	Nationals	2–4	**Syndergaard** (5–1)	Roark (3–12)	**Gsellman** (4)	**Citi Field**	26,558	38–54
93	July 14	Nationals	7–4	**Wheeler** (3–6)	Voth (0–1)	**Familia** (17)	**Citi Field**	30,438	39–54
94	July 15	Nationals	1–6	Hellickson (4–1)	**Swarzak** (0–2)	—	**Citi Field**	26,572	39–55
**89th All-Star Game in Washington, D.C.**
95	July 20	@ Yankees	7–5	**Syndergaard** (6–1)	Germán (2–6)	**Gsellman** (5)	Yankee Stadium	47,175	40–55
96	July 21	@ Yankees	6–7	Gray (7–7)	**Matz** (4–8)	Shreve (1)	Yankee Stadium	47,102	40–56
—	July 22	@ Yankees	Postponed (inclement weather). Makeup date: August 13						
97	July 23	Padres	2–3	Lucchesi (5–5)	**deGrom** (5–5)	Yates (3)	**Citi Field**	21,731	40–57
98	July 24	Padres	6–3	**Wheeler** (4–6)	Lauer (5–7)	—	**Citi Field**	21,925	41–57
99	July 25	Padres	6–4	**Oswalt** (1–2)	Richard (7–10)	**Swarzak** (2)	**Citi Field**	30,963	42–57
100	July 26	@ Pirates	12–6	**Matz** (5–8)	Kingham (5–5)	—	PNC Park	21,981	43–57
101	July 27	@ Pirates	4–5	Vázquez (4–2)	**Peterson** (2–2)	—	PNC Park	26,356	43–58
102	July 28	@ Pirates	0–5	Williams (9–7)	**deGrom** (5–6)	—	PNC Park	35,900	43–59
103	July 29	@ Pirates	1–0	**Wheeler** (5–6)	Musgrove (4–5)	**Swarzak** (3)	PNC Park	23,749	44–59
104	July 31	@ Nationals	4–25	Roark (5–12)	**Matz** (5–9)	—	Nationals Park	35,029	44–60

August: 15–15 (Home: 7–7; Away: 8–8)

#	Date	Opponent	Score	Win	Loss	Save	Stadium	Attendance	Record
105	August 1	@ Nationals	3–5	Milone (1–0)	**Syndergaard** (6–2)	Herrera (16)	Nationals Park	34,319	44–61
106	August 2	Braves	2–4	Foltynewicz (8–7)	**Vargas** (2–7)	Minter (7)	**Citi Field**	24,525	44–62
107	August 3	Braves	1–2	Sánchez (6–3)	**deGrom** (5–7)	Minter (8)	**Citi Field**	25,101	44–63
108	August 4	Braves	3–0	**Wheeler** (6–6)	Gausman (5–9)	**Gsellman** (6)	**Citi Field**	36,946	45–63
109	August 5	Braves	4–5 (10)	Minter (4–2)	**Bashlor** (0–1)	Biddle (1)	**Citi Field**	27,134	45–64
110	August 6	Reds	6–4	**Syndergaard** (7–2)	Bailey (1–9)	**Blevins** (1)	**Citi Field**	21,644	46–64
111	August 7	Reds	1–6	Romano (7–9)	**Vargas** (2–8)	—	**Citi Field**	22,207	46–65
112	August 8	Reds	8–0	**deGrom** (6–7)	Stephenson (0–1)	—	**Citi Field**	24,287	47–65
113	August 10	@ Marlins	6–2	**Wheeler** (7–6)	Ureña (3–12)	—	Marlins Park	6,993	48–65
114	August 11	@ Marlins	3–4 (11)	Guerra (1–0)	**Rhame** (0–2)	—	Marlins Park	11,478	48–66
115	August 12	@ Marlins	4–3	**Syndergaard** (8–2)	Chen (4–9)	**Lugo** (1)	Marlins Park	8,964	49–66
116	August 13	@ Yankees	8–5	**deGrom** (7–7)	Severino (15–6)	**Gsellman** (7)	Yankee Stadium	47,233	50–66
117	August 14	@ Orioles	3–6	Cashner (4–10)	**Wahl** (0–1)	Givens (4)	Oriole Park at Camden Yards	20,527	50–67
118	August 15	@ Orioles	16–5	**Wheeler** (8–6)	Bundy (7–11)	—	Oriole Park at Camden Yards	25,045	51–67
119	August 16	@ Phillies	24–4	**Oswalt** (2–2)	Suárez (1–1)	—	Citizens Bank Park	—	52–67
120	August 16	@ Phillies	6–9	Eflin (9–4)	**Matz** (5–10)	Domínguez (14)	Citizens Bank Park	33,049	52–68
121	August 17	@ Phillies	2–4	Nola (14–3)	**Syndergaard** (8–3)	Neshek (3)	Citizens Bank Park	40,460	52–69
122	August 18	@ Phillies	3–1	**deGrom** (8–7)	Arrieta (9–8)	—	Citizens Bank Park	35,158	53–69
123	August 19	@ Phillies	8–2	**Vargas** (3–8)	Pivetta (7–10)	—	BB&T Ballpark (Williamsport, PA)	2,429	54–69
124	August 20	Giants	1–2 (13)	Law (1–0)	**Bashlor** (0–2)	—	**Citi Field**	24,811	54–70
125	August 21	Giants	6–3	**Oswalt** (3–2)	Watson (4–5)	—	**Citi Field**	24,999	55–70
126	August 22	Giants	5–3	**Syndergaard** (9–3)	Kelly (0–2)	**Sewald** (1)	**Citi Field**	28,157	56–70
127	August 23	Giants	1–3	Bumgarner (5–5)	**deGrom** (8–8)	Smith (11)	**Citi Field**	25,584	56–71
128	August 24	Nationals	3–0	**Vargas** (4–8)	González (7–11)	**Gsellman** (8)	**Citi Field**	23,763	57–71
129	August 25	Nationals	3–0	**Wheeler** (9–6)	Roark (8–13)	—	**Citi Field**	29,868	58–71
130	August 26	Nationals	0–15	Rodríguez (2–1)	**Matz** (5–11)	—	**Citi Field**	23,192	58–72
131	August 27	@ Cubs	4–7	Cishek (4–1)	**Blevins** (1–2)	Chavez (3)	Wrigley Field	38,935	58–73
—	August 28	@ Cubs	Suspended (inclement weather: rain). Completion date: August 29						
132	August 29	@ Cubs	1–2 (11)	Chavez (5–2)	**Sewald** (0–5)	—	Wrigley Field	37,017	58–74
133	August 29	@ Cubs	10–3	**Vargas** (5–8)	Mills (0–1)	—	Wrigley Field	33,386	59–74
134	August 31	@ Giants	0–7	Suárez (6–9)	**Wheeler** (9–7)	—	AT&T Park	39,057	59–75

September: 18–10 (Home: 9-4; Away: 9–6)

#	Date	Opponent	Score	Win	Loss	Save	Stadium	Attendance	Record
135	September 1	@ Giants	2–1 (11)	**Blevins** (2–2)	Strickland (3–4)	**Gsellman** (9)	AT&T Park	38,875	60–75
136	September 2	@ Giants	4–1	**Syndergaard** (10–3)	Stratton (9–8)	—	AT&T Park	39,692	61–75
137	September 3	@ Dodgers	4–2	**Smith** (1–0)	Maeda (8–9)	**Gsellman** (10)	Dodger Stadium	45,206	62–75
138	September 4	@ Dodgers	4–11	Hill (7–5)	**Vargas** (5–9)	—	Dodger Stadium	46,651	62–76
139	September 5	@ Dodgers	7–3	**Wheeler** (10–7)	Ryu (4–2)	—	Dodger Stadium	40,317	63–76
140	September 7	Phillies	3–4	Nola (16–4)	**Bashlor** (0–3)	Hunter (4)	**Citi Field**	23,379	63–77
141	September 8	Phillies	10–5	**Syndergaard** (11–3)	Eflin (9–7)	—	**Citi Field**	25,094	64–77
142	September 9	Phillies	6–4	**Gagnon** (1–1)	Velasquez (9–11)	**Lugo** (2)	**Citi Field**	24,153	65–77
—	September 10	Marlins	Postponed (inclement weather: rain). Makeup date: September 12						
143	September 11	Marlins	3–5	Ureña (6–12)	**deGrom** (8–9)	—	**Citi Field**	20,849	65–78
144	September 12	Marlins	13–0	**Wheeler** (11–7)	Richards (3–9)	—	**Citi Field**	20,423	66–78
—	September 12	Marlins	Postponed (inclement weather: rain). Makeup date: September 13						
145	September 13	Marlins	4–3	**Blevins** (3–2)	Barraclough (0–6)	—	**Citi Field**	—	67–78
146	September 13	Marlins	5–2	**Vargas** (6–9)	Brigham (0–2)	**Gsellman** (11)	**Citi Field**	22,640	68–78
147	September 14	@ Red Sox	8–0	**Syndergaard** (12–3)	Cuevas (0–1)	—	Fenway Park	37,117	69–78
148	September 15	@ Red Sox	3–5	Porcello (17–7)	**Sewald** (0–6)	Kimbrel (41)	Fenway Park	36,611	69–79
149	September 16	@ Red Sox	3–4	Workman (6-0)	**Lugo** (3–4)	Wright (1)	Fenway Park	36,526	69–80
150	September 17	@ Phillies	9–4	**Wheeler** (12–7)	Hunter (4–3)	—	Citizens Bank Park	21,767	70–80
151	September 18	@ Phillies	2–5	Neshek (3–1)	**Smith** (1–1)	Neris (11)	Citizens Bank Park	18,895	70–81
152	September 19	@ Phillies	0–4	Eflin (11–7)	**Syndergaard** (12–4)	—	Citizens Bank Park	19,085	70–82
153	September 20	@ Nationals	5–4 (12)	**Rhame** (1–2)	Rodriguez (3–3)	**Sewald** (2)	Nationals Park	28,258	71–82
154	September 21	@ Nationals	4–2	**deGrom** (9–9)	Ross (0–1)	**Gsellman** (12)	Nationals Park	37,895	72–82
155	September 22	@ Nationals	0–6	Voth (1–1)	**Oswalt** (3–3)	—	Nationals Park	39,372	72–83
156	September 23	@ Nationals	8–6	**Gagnon** (2–1)	Suero (3–1)	**Swarzak** (4)	Nationals Park	34,218	73–83
157	September 25	Braves	3–7	Winkler (4–0)	**Gsellman** (6–3)	—	**Citi Field**	21,943	73–84
158	September 26	Braves	3–0	**deGrom** (10–9)	Jackson (1–2)	**Lugo** (3)	**Citi Field**	23,205	74–84
159	September 27	Braves	4–1	**Vargas** (7–9)	Teherán (9–9)	**Gsellman** (13)	**Citi Field**	24,824	75–84
160	September 28	Marlins	1–8	Ureña (9–12)	**Sewald** (0–7)	—	**Citi Field**	27,045	75–85
161	September 29	Marlins	1–0 (13)	**Zamora** (1–0)	García (3–3)	—	**Citi Field**	43,928	76–85
162	September 30	Marlins	1–0	**Syndergaard** (13–4)	Alcántara (2–3)	—	**Citi Field**	28,346	77–85

Legend: = Win = Loss = Postponement
Bold = Mets team member

== Farm system ==
Level	Team	League	Manager
AAA	Las Vegas 51s	Pacific Coast League	Tony DeFrancesco
AA	Binghamton Rumble Ponies	Eastern League	Luis Rojas
A-Advanced	St. Lucie Mets	Florida State League	Chad Kreuter
A	Columbia Fireflies	South Atlantic League	Pedro Lopéz
A-Short Season	Brooklyn Cyclones	New York–Penn League	Edgardo Alfonzo
Rookie	Kingsport Mets	Appalachian League	Sean Ratliff
Rookie	GCL Mets	Gulf Coast League	David Davalillo
Rookie	DSL Mets 1	Dominican Summer League	Manny Martinez
Rookie	DSL Mets 2	Dominican Summer League	Yucary De La Cruz

== See also ==
- 2018 MLB Little League Classic
