= 2019 New York Mets season =

2019 New York Mets
- League: National League
- Division: East
- Ballpark: Citi Field
- City: New York City, New York
- Record: 86–76 (.531)
- Divisional place: 3rd
- Owners: Fred Wilpon
- General manager: Brodie Van Wagenen
- Manager: Mickey Callaway
- Television: SportsNet New York; PIX 11 (CW affiliate) (Gary Cohen, Ron Darling, Keith Hernandez)
- Radio: WCBS 880 AM (English); New York Mets Radio Network (Howie Rose, Wayne Randazzo); Que Buena 92.7 (Spanish) (Juan Alicea, Max Perez Jiminez)

The 2019 New York Mets season was the franchise's 58th season and the team's 11th season at Citi Field. Despite improving on their 77–85 campaign from last year by 9 games with an 86–76 record, they were three games behind the Milwaukee Brewers for a Wild Card spot and thus missed the playoffs for the third consecutive season. Their division rival, the Washington Nationals, went on to win the World Series.

== Spring training ==
The Mets had a decent spring training with a record of 13–13–2, having equal wins and losses with two ties.

== Regular season ==
=== March ===
The Mets began the regular season on March 28, 2019, facing the Washington Nationals away at their home opener, winning 2–0. They won the next game and finished the last game with a loss, taking 2 out of 3.

=== April ===
The Mets started the month strong by sweeping the Miami Marlins in three games. However, the rest of the month proved to be a rollercoaster of wins and losses with division rivals such as the Washington Nationals and Philadelphia Phillies, along with splitting a series with the Atlanta Braves. Pete Alonso took home Rookie of the Month honors, as he hit nine home runs, drove in 26 runs, and finished the month with a .291 batting average.

=== May ===
The Mets started the month of May off slowly, losing 5 of their first 6. However, that one win was an impressive one, with Noah Syndergaard throwing a 1–0 shutout against the Cincinnati Reds, with a Syndergaard home run being the only run of the game. The Mets continued their slumping May, culminating in being swept in three games by the lowly Miami Marlins. However, they immediately followed that with a 6–1 homestand against the Nationals and the Detroit Tigers.

=== June ===
After coming home from a disappointing West Coast trip that saw the Mets go 2–5 with two blown leads of four runs in the 8th inning, the Mets went 4–2 on their homestand against the San Francisco Giants and Colorado Rockies. The Mets then split a day-night doubleheader with the New York Yankees in the first leg of the 2019 Subway Series. On June 20, the Mets fired pitching coach Dave Eiland and bullpen coach Chuck Hernandez, replacing them with Phil Regan and Ricky Bones respectively.

=== July ===
On July 23, Robinson Canó became the third Met to hit three home runs in one home game at Citi Field. The previous two were Kirk Nieuwenhuis and Lucas Duda, who both did so in July 2015. Cano also became the first Met to hit three home runs in any game since Yoenis Céspedes in April 2017. He is also the oldest second baseman in MLB history to hit three home runs in one game.

On July 28, the Mets traded pitching prospects Anthony Kay and Simeon Woods Richardson to the Toronto Blue Jays in exchange for Marcus Stroman.

The Mets finished the month strong, winning the last six games of the month.

=== August ===
The Mets continued their hot play to begin the month, winning 9 of their first 10 in August, including eight in a row and 15 out of 16 stretching back to July 25, their best 16-game stretch since 1990.

By August 7, the Mets had a record of 19-6 since the All-Star break, the league's best record in that time, and were within one game of a wild-card playoff berth.

On August 18, Pete Alonso hit his 40th home run of the season in an 11–5 win over the Kansas City Royals, setting a new National League record for home runs in a season by a rookie, breaking the previous record of 39 by Cody Bellinger in 2017.

On August 27, Alonso hit his 42nd home run of the season in a 5–2 loss to the Chicago Cubs, setting a new record for home runs in a season by a Mets player. This is also the first time any MLB rookie has set a franchise record for home runs in a season since Johnny Rizzo did so for the Pittsburgh Pirates in 1938.

The Mets' wild card chances took a hit after back-to-back series sweeps against the Atlanta Braves and Cubs, but the team closed out the month with two consecutive wins against the Philadelphia Phillies.

August saw the continued improvement of the Mets bullpen, which had struggled prior to the All-Star break, but had a 3.79 ERA in the second half of the season as of the end of August, ranking fifth in the major leagues.

=== September ===
Mets catcher Wilson Ramos had a career-best 26-game hitting streak through September 4. It was tied with David Wright in 2006–07 for the second-longest streak in Mets history, was the longest ever for a Mets catcher, and was the longest in the MLB since Freddie Freeman's 30-game streak for the Atlanta Braves in 2016.

The Mets suffered a historic loss on September 3, surrendering a 6-run lead in the bottom of the ninth inning against the Washington Nationals in an 11–10 loss. The Mets had a projected 99.7% chance of winning heading into the bottom of the ninth, and before the loss, MLB teams in 2019 leading by six runs of more in the ninth inning had a perfect 274–0 record, and the Mets had an 806–0 franchise record when leading by six or more in the ninth. Edwin Díaz allowed a three-run walk-off home run in the game. As of September 6, Díaz had allowed 14 ninth-inning home runs in 2019, tying Francisco Rodríguez of the Milwaukee Brewers in 2014 for the most allowed in a season in MLB history. The Mets had allowed 31 total ninth-inning home runs in 2019 as of September 6, the most by any team in league history.

On September 18, with Pete Alonso's 49th home run of the season, the team broke their single-season franchise record for home runs, surpassing the 224 hit by the 2017 team.

As the Nationals and Brewers both won on September 23, the Mets fell behind 6–0 to the 54–101 Miami Marlins and lost 8–4, making one Brewers win enough to eliminate them from playoff contention.

Despite beating the Marlins 10–3 on September 25, the Mets were eliminated from the playoffs that day due to the Brewers beating the Cincinnati Reds to clinch a Wild Card.

On September 27, Alonso hit his 52nd home run of the season off of Atlanta Braves pitcher Dallas Keuchel, tying Aaron Judge's rookie record set in 2017. The next night, Alonso broke the record, hitting his 53rd home run off of pitcher Mike Foltynewicz.

On September 29, during the final game of the regular season, Dominic Smith hit a walk-off, three-run homer in the 11th inning off of pitcher Grant Dayton, giving the Mets a 7–6 victory.

The Mets finished the season in 3rd place at 86–76, 11 games behind the Braves and 3 games behind the Brewers for the second wild card spot. The Mets went 46–26 after the All-Star break, which was the second-best record in the National League behind only the Los Angeles Dodgers (46-24).

== Season standings ==
=== National League East ===
NL East
Team	W	L	Pct.	GB	Home	Road
Atlanta Braves	97	65	.599	—	50‍–‍31	47‍–‍34
Washington Nationals	93	69	.574	4	50‍–‍31	43‍–‍38
New York Mets	86	76	.531	11	48‍–‍33	38‍–‍43
Philadelphia Phillies	81	81	.500	16	45‍–‍36	36‍–‍45
Miami Marlins	57	105	.352	40	30‍–‍51	27‍–‍54

=== National League division leaders ===
Division leaders
Team	W	L	Pct.
Los Angeles Dodgers	106	56	.654
Atlanta Braves	97	65	.599
St. Louis Cardinals	91	71	.562

Wild Card teams (Top 2 teams qualify for postseason)
Team	W	L	Pct.	GB
Washington Nationals	93	69	.574	+4
Milwaukee Brewers	89	73	.549	—
New York Mets	86	76	.531	3
Arizona Diamondbacks	85	77	.525	4
Chicago Cubs	84	78	.519	5
Philadelphia Phillies	81	81	.500	8
San Francisco Giants	77	85	.475	12
Cincinnati Reds	75	87	.463	14
Colorado Rockies	71	91	.438	18
San Diego Padres	70	92	.432	19
Pittsburgh Pirates	69	93	.426	20
Miami Marlins	57	105	.352	32

=== Record vs. opponents ===
2019 National League record Source: MLB Standings Grid – 2019
Team	AZ	ATL	CHC	CIN	COL	LAD	MIA	MIL	NYM	PHI	PIT	SD	SF	STL	WSH	AL
Arizona	—	4–3	2–4	3–3	9–10	8–11	3–4	2–5	2–5	4–2	6–1	11–8	10–9	3–3	4–3	14–6
Atlanta	3–4	—	5–2	3–4	3–3	2–4	15–4	3–3	11–8	9–10	5–2	5–2	5–2	4–2	11–8	13–7
Chicago	4–2	2–5	—	8–11	3–3	3–4	6–1	9–10	5–2	2–5	11–8	4–3	4–2	9–10	2–4	12–8
Cincinnati	3–3	4–3	11–8	—	3–3	1–5	6–1	8–11	3–4	3–4	7–12	5–2	4–3	7–12	1–5	9–11
Colorado	10–9	3–3	3–3	3–3	—	4–15	5–2	5–2	2–4	3–4	2–5	11–8	7–12	2–5	3–4	8–12
Los Angeles	11–8	4–2	4–3	5–1	15–4	—	5–1	4–3	5–2	5–2	6–0	13–6	12–7	3–4	4–3	10–10
Miami	4–3	4–15	1–6	1–6	2–5	1–5	—	2–5	6–13	10–9	3–3	4–2	3–3	3–4	4–15	9–11
Milwaukee	5–2	3–3	10–9	11–8	2–5	3–4	5–2	—	5–1	4–3	15–4	3–4	2–4	9–10	4–2	8–12
New York	5–2	8–11	2–5	4–3	4–2	2–5	13–6	1–5	—	7–12	5–1	3–3	3–4	2–5	12–7	15–5
Philadelphia	2–4	10–9	5–2	4–3	4–3	2–5	9–10	3–4	12–7	—	4–2	3–3	3–4	4–2	5–14	11–9
Pittsburgh	1–6	2–5	8–11	12–7	5–2	0–6	3–3	4–15	1–5	2–4	—	6–1	5–2	5–14	3–4	12–8
San Diego	8–11	2–5	3–4	2–5	8–11	6–13	2–4	4–3	3–3	3–3	1–6	—	9–10	4–2	4–3	11–9
San Francisco	9–10	2–5	2–4	3–4	12–7	7–12	3–3	4–2	4–3	4–3	2–5	10–9	—	3–4	1–5	11–9
St. Louis	3–3	2–4	10–9	12–7	5–2	4–3	4–3	10–9	5–2	2–4	14–5	2–4	4–3	—	5–2	9–11
Washington	3–4	8–11	4–2	5–1	4–3	3–4	15–4	2–4	7–12	14–5	4–3	3–4	5–1	2–5	—	14–6

== Roster ==
2019 New York Mets
Roster
Pitchers: 43 Luis Avilán; 49 Tyler Bashlor; 29 Brad Brach; 48 Jacob deGrom; 39 Edwin Díaz; 27 Jeurys Familia; 64 Chris Flexen; 68 Wilmer Font; 47 Drew Gagnon; 65 Robert Gsellman; 68 Donnie Hart; 61 Walker Lockett; 67 Seth Lugo; 32 Steven Matz; 74 Chris Mazza; 72 Stephen Nogosek; 71 Ryan O'Rourke; 55 Corey Oswalt; 63 Tim Peterson; 46 Brooks Pounders; 35 Jacob Rhame; 33 Hector Santiago; 51 Paul Sewald; 7 Marcus Stroman; 34 Noah Syndergaard; 44 Jason Vargas; 45 Zack Wheeler; 38 Justin Wilson; 73 Daniel Zamora	Catchers: 18 Travis d'Arnaud; 3 Tomas Nido; 40 Wilson Ramos; 44 René Rivera; Infielders: 20 Pete Alonso; 24 Robinson Canó; 21 Todd Frazier; 15,13 Luis Guillorme; 11 Adeiny Hechavarria; 2 Joe Panik; 1 Amed Rosario; 11 Rubén Tejada	Outfielders: 23 Aaron Altherr; 23 Keon Broxton; 30 Michael Conforto; 28 J. D. Davis; 18 Rajai Davis; 91 Carlos Gómez; 19 Sam Haggerty; 12 Juan Lagares; 6 Jeff McNeil; 9 Brandon Nimmo; 22 Dominic Smith; Other batters: 4 Jed Lowrie	Manager: 36,26 Mickey Callaway; Coaches: 60 Jeremy Accardo (pitching strategist); 25 Ricky Bones (bullpen); 54 Chili Davis (hitting); 10 Gary DiSarcina (third base/infield); 58 Dave Eiland (pitching); 59 Chuck Hernandez (bullpen); 78 Eric Langill (bullpen catcher); 57 Dave Racaniello (bullpen catcher); 58 Phil Regan (pitching); 50 Jim Riggleman (bench coach); 60 Luis Rojas (quality control coach); 53 Glenn Sherlock (first base/catching); 56 Tom Slater (assistant hitting)

== Game log ==
Legend
	Mets win
	Mets loss
	Postponement
	Eliminated from playoff spot
**Bold**	Mets team member

2019 Game Log
Overall: 86–76 (Home: 48–33; Away: 38–43)
March: 2–1 (Home: 0–0; Away: 2–1)

#	Date	Opponent	Score	Win	Loss	Save	Stadium	Attendance	Record
1	March 28	@ Nationals	2–0	**deGrom** (1–0)	Scherzer (0–1)	**Díaz** (1)	Nationals Park	42,263	1–0
2	March 30	@ Nationals	11–8	**Wilson** (1–0)	Rosenthal (0–1)	**Díaz** (2)	Nationals Park	33,765	2–0
3	March 31	@ Nationals	5–6	Doolittle (1–0)	**Wilson** (1–1)	—	Nationals Park	23,430	2–1

April: 13–13 (Home: 6–7; Away: 7–6)

#	Date	Opponent	Score	Win	Loss	Save	Stadium	Attendance	Record
4	April 1	@ Marlins	7–3	**Familia** (1–0)	Steckenrider (0–1)	—	Marlins Park	6,489	3–1
5	April 2	@ Marlins	6–5	**Vargas** (1–0)	Ureña (0–2)	**Wilson** (1)	Marlins Park	5,934	4–1
6	April 3	@ Marlins	6–4	**deGrom** (2–0)	Richards (0–1)	**Díaz** (3)	Marlins Park	7,486	5–1
7	April 4	Nationals	0–4	Strasburg (1–0)	**Syndergaard** (0–1)	—	**Citi Field**	44,424	5–2
8	April 6	Nationals	6–5	**Familia** (2–0)	Sipp (0–1)	**Díaz** (4)	**Citi Field**	35,156	6–2
9	April 7	Nationals	9–12	Scherzer (1–2)	**Wheeler** (0–1)	—	**Citi Field**	40,681	6–3
10	April 9	Twins	8–14	Hildenberger (2–0)	**deGrom** (2–1)	—	**Citi Field**	22,126	6–4
11	April 10	Twins	9–6	**Syndergaard** (1–1)	Odorizzi (0–2)	—	**Citi Field**	20,946	7–4
12	April 11	@ Braves	6–3	**Matz** (1–0)	Gausman (1–1)	**Díaz** (5)	SunTrust Park	24,015	8–4
13	April 12	@ Braves	6–2	**Wheeler** (1–1)	Wright (0–2)	—	SunTrust Park	33,334	9–4
14	April 13	@ Braves	7–11	Toussaint (1–0)	**Oswalt** (0–1)	—	SunTrust Park	40,117	9–5
15	April 14	@ Braves	3–7	Teherán (2–1)	**deGrom** (2–2)	—	SunTrust Park	23,385	9–6
16	April 15	@ Phillies	7–6 (11)	**Avilán** (1–0)	Neshek (0–1)	**Díaz** (6)	Citizens Bank Park	32,423	10–6
17	April 16	@ Phillies	3–14	Pivetta (2–1)	**Matz** (1–1)	Eickhoff (1)	Citizens Bank Park	43,933	10–7
18	April 17	@ Phillies	2–3	Arrieta (3–1)	**Wheeler** (1–2)	Neris (2)	Citizens Bank Park	39,861	10–8
19	April 19	@ Cardinals	5–4	**Lugo** (1–0)	Wainwright (1–2)	**Díaz** (7)	Busch Stadium	40,413	11–8
20	April 20	@ Cardinals	2–10	Mikolas (2–1)	**Flexen** (0–1)	—	Busch Stadium	47,059	11–9
21	April 21	@ Cardinals	4–6	Hudson (1–1)	**Syndergaard** (1–2)	Hicks (5)	Busch Stadium	42,765	11–10
22	April 22	Phillies	5–1	**Matz** (2–1)	Arrieta (3–2)	—	**Citi Field**	25,293	12–10
23	April 23	Phillies	9–0	**Wheeler** (2–2)	Eflin (2–3)	—	**Citi Field**	26,049	13–10
24	April 24	Phillies	0–6	Valasquez (1–0)	**Vargas** (1–1)	—	**Citi Field**	27,685	13–11
25	April 26	Brewers	2–10	Albers (2–1)	**deGrom** (2–3)	—	**Citi Field**	28,131	13–12
26	April 27	Brewers	6–8	Woodruff (3–1)	**Syndergaard** (1–3)	Hader (6)	**Citi Field**	40,610	13–13
27	April 28	Brewers	5–2	**Matz** (3–1)	Barnes (1–1)	**Díaz** (8)	**Citi Field**	25,756	14–13
28	April 29	Reds	4–5	Iglesias (1–3)	**Díaz** (0–1)	—	**Citi Field**	20,766	14–14
29	April 30	Reds	5–4 (10)	**Gagnon** (1–0)	Iglesias (1–4)	—	**Citi Field**	20,836	15–14

May: 13–15 (Home: 9–2; Away: 4–13)

#	Date	Opponent	Score	Win	Loss	Save	Stadium	Attendance	Record
30	May 1	Reds	0–1	Duke (2–1)	**Díaz** (0–2)	Lorenzen (2)	**Citi Field**	22,119	15–15
31	May 2	Reds	1–0	**Syndergaard** (2–3)	Mahle (0–4)	—	**Citi Field**	21,445	16–15
32	May 3	@ Brewers	1–3	Woodruff (4–1)	**Matz** (3–2)	Hader (8)	Miller Park	32,550	16–16
33	May 4	@ Brewers	3–4 (18)	Williams (1–1)	**Flexen** (0–2)	—	Miller Park	39,565	16–17
34	May 5	@ Brewers	2–3	Davies (4–0)	**Vargas** (1–2)	Hader (9)	Miller Park	36,016	16–18
35	May 6	@ Padres	0–4	Paddack (3–1)	**deGrom** (2–4)	Stammen (1)	Petco Park	20,176	16–19
36	May 7	@ Padres	7–6	**Lugo** (2–0)	Warren (2–1)	**Díaz** (9)	Petco Park	23,129	17–19
37	May 8	@ Padres	2–3	Reyes (2–0)	**Bashlor** (0–1)	Yates (15)	Petco Park	21,952	17–20
38	May 10	Marlins	11–2	**Wheeler** (3–2)	López (2–5)	—	**Citi Field**	25,194	18–20
39	May 11	Marlins	4–2	**deGrom** (3–4)	Alcántara (1–4)	**Díaz** (10)	**Citi Field**	32,501	19–20
—	May 12	Marlins	Postponed (inclement weather: rain). Makeup date: August 5th						
40	May 14	@ Nationals	6–2	**Syndergaard** (3–3)	Hellickson (2–2)	—	Nationals Park	23,315	20–20
41	May 15	@ Nationals	1–5	Corbin (4–1)	**Font** (1–1)	—	Nationals Park	29,673	20–21
42	May 16	@ Nationals	6–7	Jennings (1–2)	**Wheeler** (3–3)	Doolittle (7)	Nationals Park	28,807	20–22
43	May 17	@ Marlins	6–8	Richards (1–5)	**deGrom** (3–5)	Romo (7)	Marlins Park	9,870	20–23
44	May 18	@ Marlins	0–2	López (3–5)	**Matz** (3–3)	Conley (2)	Marlins Park	13,474	20–24
45	May 19	@ Marlins	0–3	Alcántara (2–4)	**Syndergaard** (3–4)	—	Marlins Park	15,983	20–25
46	May 20	Nationals	5–3	**Gagnon** (2–0)	Corbin (4–2)	**Díaz** (11)	**Citi Field**	22,335	21–25
47	May 21	Nationals	6–5	**Díaz** (1–2)	Rainey (0–1)	—	**Citi Field**	24,631	22–25
48	May 22	Nationals	6–1	**Gagnon** (3–0)	Barraclough (0–1)	—	**Citi Field**	27,188	23–25
49	May 23	Nationals	6–4	**Gsellman** (1–0)	Suero (1–4)	**Díaz** (12)	**Citi Field**	29,962	24–25
50	May 24	Tigers	8–9	Farmer (3–3)	**Gagnon** (3–1)	Greene (16)	**Citi Field**	27,082	24–26
51	May 25	Tigers	5–4 (13)	**Santiago** (4–5)	Farmer (3–4)	—	**Citi Field**	40,691	25–26
52	May 26	Tigers	4–3	**Wheeler** (4–3)	Turnbull (2–4)	**Díaz** (13)	**Citi Field**	31,414	26–26
53	May 27	@ Dodgers	5–9	Kershaw (5–0)	**Bashlor** (0–2)	Jansen (15)	Dodger Stadium	47,816	26–27
54	May 28	@ Dodgers	7–3	**Matz** (4-3)	Garcia (0-2)	—	Dodger Stadium	45,713	27-27
55	May 29	@ Dodgers	8–9	Alexander (3–1)	**Díaz** (1–3)		Dodger Stadium	40,559	27–28
56	May 30	@ Dodgers	0–2	Ryu (8-1)	**Vargas** (1-3)	Jansen (16)	Dodger Stadium	47,848	27–29
57	May 31	@ Diamondbacks	5–4	**Wheeler** (5–3)	Andriese (3–4)	Gsellman (1)	Chase Field	24,664	28–29

June: 10–18 (Home: 6–7; Away: 4–11)

#	Date	Opponent	Score	Win	Loss	Save	Stadium	Attendance	Record
58	June 1	@ Diamondbacks	5–6 (11)	Hirano (2–3)	**Bashlor** (0–3)		Chase Field	34,888	28–30
59	June 2	@ Diamondbacks	1–7	Kelly (5–6)	**Matz** (4–4)	—	Chase Field	26,945	28–31
60	June 4	Giants	3–9	Melancon (2–0)	**Gsellman** (1–1)	—	**Citi Field**	24,878	28–32
61	June 5	Giants	7–0	**Vargas** (2–3)	Beede (0–2)	—	**Citi Field**	23,357	29–32
62	June 6	Giants	7–3	**Lugo** (3–0)	Melancon (2–1)	—	**Citi Field**	28,857	30–32
63	June 7	Rockies	1–5	Senzatela (5–4)	**deGrom** (3–6)	—	**Citi Field**	27,520	30–33
64	June 8	Rockies	5–3	**Matz** (5–4)	Gray (5–5)	**Díaz** (14)	**Citi Field**	29,077	31–33
65	June 9	Rockies	6–1	**Syndergaard** (4–4)	Hoffman (1–3)	—	**Citi Field**	29,531	32–33
—	June 10	@ Yankees	Postponed (inclement weather: rain). Makeup date: June 11 (doubleheader)						
66	June 11	@ Yankees	5–12	Tanaka (4–5)	**Wheeler** (5–4)	—	Yankee Stadium	41,538	32–34
67	June 11	@ Yankees	10–4	**Vargas** (3–3)	Paxton (3–3)	—	Yankee Stadium	44,698	33–34
68	June 13	Cardinals	Suspended (inclement weather: rain). Continuation date: June 14 (doubleheader)						
68	June 14	Cardinals	4–5 (10)	Martínez (1–0)	**Díaz** (1–4)	Hicks (14)	**Citi Field**	31,862	33–35
69	June 14	Cardinals	5–9	Gant (6–0)	**Familia** (2–1)	—	**Citi Field**	28,560	33–36
70	June 15	Cardinals	8–7	**Syndergaard** (5–4)	Wacha (4–3)	**Díaz** (15)	**Citi Field**	32,589	34–36
71	June 16	Cardinals	3–4	Miller (3–2)	**Flexen** (0–3)	Martínez (2)	**Citi Field**	37,054	34–37
72	June 17	@ Braves	3–12	Soroka (8–1)	**Wheeler** (5–5)	—	SunTrust Park	24,660	34–38
73	June 18	@ Braves	10–2	**deGrom** (4–6)	Teherán (5–5)	—	SunTrust Park	24,791	35–38
74	June 19	@ Braves	2–7	Fried (8–3)	**Matz** (5–5)	—	SunTrust Park	37,104	35–39
75	June 20	@ Cubs	4–7	Alzolay (1–0)	**Lockett** (0–1)	Cishek (7)	Wrigley Field	38,956	35–40
76	June 21	@ Cubs	5–4	**Pounders** (1–0)	Brach (3–2)	**Díaz** (16)	Wrigley Field	41,078	36–40
77	June 22	@ Cubs	10–2	**Wheeler** (6–5)	Quintana (4–7)	—	Wrigley Field	41,106	37–40
78	June 23	@ Cubs	3–5	Cishek (2–4)	**Lugo** (3–1)	Strop (9)	Wrigley Field	39,077	37–41
79	June 24	@ Phillies	7–13	Eflin (7–7)	**Matz** (5–6)	—	Citizens Bank Park	29,117	37–42
80	June 25	@ Phillies	5–7	Arrieta (7–6)	**Font** (1–2)	Neris (16)	Citizens Bank Park	28,125	37–43
81	June 26	@ Phillies	4–5 (10)	García (2–0)	**Nogosek** (0–1)	—	Citizens Bank Park	29,822	37–44
82	June 27	@ Phillies	3–6	Hammer (1–0)	**Díaz** (1–5)	—	Citizens Bank Park	39,161	37–45
83	June 28	Braves	2–6	Soroka (9–1)	**deGrom** (4–7)	—	**Citi Field**	36,421	37–46
84	June 29	Braves	4–5	Newcomb (2–0)	**Lugo** (3–2)	Jackson (13)	**Citi Field**	40,809	37–47
85	June 30	Braves	8–5	**Font** (2–2)	Newcomb (2–1)	**Díaz** (17)	**Citi Field**	31,743	38–47

July: 14–8 (Home: 7–4; Away: 7–4)

#	Date	Opponent	Score	Win	Loss	Save	Stadium	Attendance	Record
86	July 2	Yankees	4–2	**Lugo** (4–2)	Ottavino (3–3)	**Díaz** (18)	**Citi Field**	42,150	39–47
87	July 3	Yankees	1–5	Germán (10–2)	**Vargas** (3–4)	—	**Citi Field**	43,323	39–48
88	July 5	Phillies	2–7	Morgan (3–3)	**Díaz** (1–6)	—	**Citi Field**	32,546	39–49
89	July 6	Phillies	6–5	**Syndergaard** (6–4)	Arrieta (8–7)	**Díaz** (19)	**Citi Field**	31,350	40–49
90	July 7	Phillies	3–8	Nola (8–2)	**Wheeler** (6–6)	—	**Citi Field**	34,247	40–50
**90th All-Star Game in Cleveland, Ohio**
91	July 12	@ Marlins	4–8	Smith (5–4)	**Vargas** (3–5)	—	Marlins Park	11,856	40–51
92	July 13	@ Marlins	4–2	**Syndergaard** (7–4)	Anderson (2–4)	**Díaz** (20)	Marlins Park	12,963	41–51
93	July 14	@ Marlins	6–2	**deGrom** (5–7)	Alcántara (4–9)	—	Marlins Park	14,780	42–51
94	July 16	@ Twins	3–2	**Avilán** (2–0)	Pineda (6–5)	**Díaz** (21)	Target Field	28,712	43–51
95	July 17	@ Twins	14–4	**Vargas** (4–5)	May (3–3)	—	Target Field	35,124	44–51
96	July 18	@ Giants	2–3 (16)	Jerez (1–0)	**Mazza** (0–1)	—	Oracle Park	36,862	44–52
97	July 19	@ Giants	0–1 (10)	Dyson (4–1)	**Rhame** (0–1)	—	Oracle Park	32,861	44–53
98	July 20	@ Giants	11–4	**Lockett** (1–1)	Samardzija (7–8)	—	Oracle Park	33,860	45–53
99	July 21	@ Giants	2–3 (12)	Gott (6–0)	**Gsellman** (1–2)	—	Oracle Park	35,406	45–54
100	July 23	Padres	5–2	**Vargas** (5–5)	Paddack (6–5)	**Díaz** (22)	**Citi Field**	33,199	46–54
101	July 24	Padres	2–7	Strahm (4–7)	**Syndergaard** (7–5)	—	**Citi Field**	32,252	46–55
102	July 25	Padres	4–0	**deGrom** (6–7)	Lauer (5–8)	—	**Citi Field**	37,822	47–55
103	July 26	Pirates	6–3	**Wheeler** (7–6)	Agrazal (2–1)	**Lugo** (1)	**Citi Field**	33,776	48–55
104	July 27	Pirates	3–0	**Matz** (6–6)	Williams (3–4)		**Citi Field**	39,944	49–55
105	July 28	Pirates	8–7	**Vargas** (6–5)	Archer (3–8)	**Díaz** (23)	**Citi Field**	32,976	50–55
106	July 30	@ White Sox	5–2 (11)	**Gsellman** (2–2)	Ruiz (1–2)	—	Guaranteed Rate Field	15,947	51–55
107	July 31	@ White Sox	4–2	**Wilson** (2–1)	Colomé (3–2)	**Díaz** (24)	Guaranteed Rate Field	25,812	52–55

August: 17–11 (Home: 9–7; Away: 8–4)

#	Date	Opponent	Score	Win	Loss	Save	Stadium	Attendance	Record
108	August 1	@ White Sox	4–0	**Wheeler** (8–6)	Cease (1–4)	—	Guaranteed Rate Field	23,477	53–55
109	August 2	@ Pirates	4–8	Williams (4–4)	**Matz** (6–7)	—	PNC Park	24,311	53–56
110	August 3	@ Pirates	7–5	**Wilson** (3–1)	Crick (3–6)	—	PNC Park	37,335	54–56
111	August 4	@ Pirates	13–2	**Syndergaard** (8–5)	Musgrove (8–10)	—	PNC Park	22,716	55–56
112	August 5	Marlins	6–2	**deGrom** (7–7)	Dugger (0–1)	—	**Citi Field**	N/A	56–56
113	August 5	Marlins	5–4	**Familia** (3–1)	Brigham (1–1)	**Lugo** (2)	**Citi Field**	29,645	57–56
114	August 6	Marlins	5–0	**Wheeler** (9–6)	Noesí (0–1)	—	**Citi Field**	27,479	58–56
115	August 7	Marlins	7–2	**Matz** (7–7)	Yamamoto (4–3)	—	**Citi Field**	26,349	59–56
116	August 9	Nationals	7–6	**Avilán** (3–0)	Doolittle (6–4)	—	**Citi Field**	39,602	60–56
117	August 10	Nationals	4–3	**Lugo** (5–2)	Rodney (0–5)	—	**Citi Field**	43,875	61–56
118	August 11	Nationals	4–7	Grace (1–2)	**Gsellman** (2–3)	Doolittle (26)	**Citi Field**	41,000	61–57
119	August 13	@ Braves	3–5	Fried (14–4)	**Wheeler** (9–7)	Melancon (2)	SunTrust Park	27,627	61–58
120	August 14	@ Braves	4–6	Martin (1–3)	**Lugo** (5–3)	Blevins (1)	SunTrust Park	23,582	61–59
121	August 15	@ Braves	10–8	**Stroman** (7–11)	Teherán (7–8)	**Díaz** (25)	SunTrust Park	25,424	62–59
122	August 16	@ Royals	1–4	Montgomery (3–5)	**Syndergaard** (8–6)	Kennedy (21)	Kauffman Stadium	21,439	62–60
123	August 17	@ Royals	4–1	**deGrom** (8–7)	Junis (8–11)	**Lugo** (3)	Kauffman Stadium	28,697	63–60
124	August 18	@ Royals	11–5	**Familia** (4–1)	McCarthy (2–2)	—	Kauffman Stadium	20,661	64–60
125	August 20	Indians	9–2	**Matz** (8–7)	Bieber (12–6)	—	**Citi Field**	33,800	65–60
126	August 21	Indians	4–3 (10)	**Avilán** (4–0)	Hand (6–4)	—	**Citi Field**	28,349	66–60
127	August 22	Indians	2–0 (8)	**Syndergaard** (9–6)	Civale (1–3)	**Sewald** (1)	**Citi Field**	30,998	67–60
128	August 23	Braves	1–2 (14)	Jackson (7–2)	**Familia** (4–2)	Melancon (5)	**Citi Field**	31,437	67–61
129	August 24	Braves	5–9	Tomlin (2–1)	**Brach** (4–4)	—	**Citi Field**	38,300	67–62
130	August 25	Braves	1–2	Keuchel (5–5)	**Matz** (8–8)	Melancon (6)	**Citi Field**	30,170	67–63
131	August 27	Cubs	2–5	Darvish (5–6)	**Stroman** (7–12)	—	**Citi Field**	34,158	67–64
132	August 28	Cubs	7–10	Ryan (4–2)	**Syndergaard** (9–7)	Kimbrel (12)	**Citi Field**	33,987	67–65
133	August 29	Cubs	1–4	Lester (11–9)	**deGrom** (8–8)	Kimbrel (13)	**Citi Field**	38,389	67–66
134	August 30	@ Phillies	11–5	**Wilson** (4–1)	Morin (1–1)	—	Citizens Bank Park	30,503	68–66
135	August 31	@ Phillies	6–3	**Matz** (9–8)	Vargas (6–7)	**Lugo** (4)	Citizens Bank Park	40,690	69–66

September: 17–10 (Home: 11–6; Away: 6–4)

#	Date	Opponent	Score	Win	Loss	Save	Stadium	Attendance	Record
136	September 1	@ Phillies	2–5	Neris (3–5)	**Zamora** (0–1)	—	Citizens Bank Park	33,492	69–67
137	September 2	@ Nationals	7–3	**Syndergaard** (10–7)	Ross (3–4)	—	Nationals Park	25,329	70–67
138	September 3	@ Nationals	10–11	Guerra (3–1)	**Díaz** (1–7)	—	Nationals Park	20,759	70–68
139	September 4	@ Nationals	8–4	**Wheeler** (10–7)	Sánchez (8–7)	—	Nationals Park	20,237	71–68
140	September 6	Phillies	5–4	**Díaz** (2–7)	Morin (1–2)	—	**Citi Field**	28,107	72–68
141	September 7	Phillies	0–5	Smyly (4–6)	**Stroman** (7–13)	—	**Citi Field**	28,848	72–69
142	September 8	Phillies	7–10	Suárez (5–1)	**Sewald** (0–1)	Neris (24)	**Citi Field**	30,264	72–70
143	September 9	Diamondbacks	3–1	**deGrom** (9–8)	Kelly (10–14)	**Lugo** (5)	**Citi Field**	21,337	73–70
144	September 10	Diamondbacks	3–2	**Wheeler** (11–7)	Gallen (3–5)	**Wilson** (2)	**Citi Field**	20,843	74–70
145	September 11	Diamondbacks	9–0	**Matz** (10–8)	Ray (12–8)	—	**Citi Field**	21,841	75–70
146	September 12	Diamondbacks	11–1	**Stroman** (8–13)	Young (7–4)	—	**Citi Field**	21,856	76–70
147	September 13	Dodgers	2–9	Kershaw (14–5)	**Syndergaard** (10–8)	—	**Citi Field**	36,097	76–71
148	September 14	Dodgers	3–0	**Lugo** (6–3)	Kelly (5–4)	**Wilson** (3)	**Citi Field**	39,264	77–71
149	September 15	Dodgers	2–3	Jansen (5–3)	**Lugo** (6–4)	Maeda (2)	**Citi Field**	31,521	77–72
150	September 16	@ Rockies	4–9	Senzatela (10–10)	**Matz** (10–9)	—	Coors Field	28,505	77–73
151	September 17	@ Rockies	6–1	**Stroman** (9–13)	Melville (2–3)	—	Coors Field	33,118	78–73
152	September 18	@ Rockies	7–4	**Lugo** (7–4)	Díaz (5–4)	—	Coors Field	30,174	79–73
153	September 20	@ Reds	8–1	**deGrom** (10–8)	Castillo (15–7)	—	Great American Ball Park	20,576	80–73
154	September 21	@ Reds	2–3	Kuhnel (1–0)	**Wilson** (4–2)	Iglesias (34)	Great American Ball Park	30,487	80–74
155	September 22	@ Reds	6–3	**Brach** (5–4)	Bauer (11–13)	**Wilson** (4)	Great American Ball Park	21,335	81–74
156	September 23	Marlins	4–8	Smith (10–10)	**Matz** (10–10)	—	**Citi Field**	21,189	81–75
157	September 24	Marlins	5–4 (11)	**Sewald** (1–1)	Conley (2–10)	—	**Citi Field**	21,766	82–75
158	September 25	Marlins	10–3	**deGrom** (11–8)	Dugger (0–4)	—	**Citi Field**	21,471	83–75
159	September 26	Marlins	2–4	Brigham (3–2)	**Wheeler** (11–8)	Ureña (3)	**Citi Field**	21,729	83–76
160	September 27	Braves	4–2	**Stroman** (10–13)	Keuchel (8–8)	**Lugo** (6)	**Citi Field**	26,264	84–76
161	September 28	Braves	3–0	**Matz** (11–10)	Foltynewicz (8–6)	**Díaz** (26)	**Citi Field**	32,210	85–76
162	September 29	Braves	7–6 (11)	**Mazza** (1–1)	Dayton (0–1)	—	**Citi Field**	31,523	86–76

== Player stats ==
Note: Team batting and pitching leaders in each category are in bold.

=== Batting ===
==== Starters by position ====
Note: Pos = Position; G = Games played; AB = At bats; H = Hits; Avg. = Batting average; HR = Home runs; RBI = Runs batted in; OPS = OBP + SLG (On base + slugging percentage)

Player	Pos	G	AB	H	Avg.	HR	RBI	OPS
Wilson Ramos	C	141	473	136	.288	14	73	.768
Pete Alonso	1B	**161**	597	155	.260	**53**	**120**	**.941**
Robinson Cano	2B	107	390	100	.256	13	39	.736
Amed Rosario	SS	157	**616**	**177**	.287	15	72	.755
Todd Frazier	3B	133	447	112	.251	21	67	.772
J. D. Davis	LF	140	410	126	.307	22	57	.895
Juan Lagares	CF	133	258	55	.213	5	27	.605
Michael Conforto	RF	151	549	141	.257	33	92	.856

==== Other batters ====
Note: Pos = Position; G = Games played; AB = At bats; H = Hits; Avg. = Batting average; HR = Home runs; RBI = Runs batted in; OPS = OBP + SLG (On base + slugging percentage)

Player	Pos	G	AB	H	Avg.	HR	RBI	OPS
Jeff McNeil	UT	133	510	162	**.318**	23	75	.916
Brandon Nimmo	OF	69	199	44	.221	8	29	.783
Dominic Smith	LF	89	177	50	.282	11	25	.881
Adeiny Hechevarria	2B	60	142	29	.204	5	18	.611
Tomás Nido	C	50	136	26	.191	4	14	.547
Joe Panik	2B	39	94	26	.277	2	12	.738
Carlos Gómez	OF	34	86	17	.198	3	10	.616
Luis Guillorme	IF	45	61	15	.246	1	3	.684
Keon Broxton	OF	34	49	7	.143	0	2	.371
Aaron Altherr	OF	26	31	4	.129	1	2	.458
Rajai Davis	OF	29	25	5	.200	1	8	.631
Travis d'Arnaud	C	10	23	2	.087	0	2	.247
René Rivera	C	9	17	4	.235	1	3	.762
Rubén Tejada	IF	6	9	0	.000	0	0	.000
Jed Lowrie	PH	9	7	0	.000	0	0	.000
Sam Haggerty	UT	11	4	0	.000	0	0	.000

=== Pitching ===
==== Starting and other pitchers ====
Note: W = Wins; L = Losses; ERA = Earned run average; G = Games pitched; GS = Games started; IP = Innings pitched; SO = Strikeouts; WHIP = Walks and hits per inning pitched

Player	W	L	ERA	G	GS	IP	SO	WHIP
Jacob deGrom SP	**11**	8	**2.43**	32	**32**	**204.0**	**255**	**0.971**
Noah Syndergaard SP	10	8	4.28	32	**32**	197.2	202	1.234
Zach Wheeler SP	**11**	8	3.96	31	31	195.1	195	1.259
Steven Matz SP	**11**	**10**	4.21	32	30	160.1	153	1.341
Jason Vargas SP	6	5	4.01	19	18	94.1	81	1.272
Marcus Stroman SP	4	2	3.77	11	11	59.2	60	1.475
Wilmer Font	1	2	4.94	15	3	31.0	24	1.355
Walker Lockett	1	1	8.34	9	4	22.2	16	1.721
Chris Flexen	0	3	6.59	9	1	13.2	10	2.049

==== Relief pitchers ====
Note: W = Wins; L = Losses; ERA = Earned run average; G = Games pitched; GF = Games finished; SV = Saves; IP = Innings pitched; SO = Strikeouts; WHIP = Walks and hits per inning pitched

Player	W	L	ERA	G	GF	SV	IP	SO	WHIP
Edwin Diaz CL	2	7	5.59	**66**	**48**	**26**	58.0	99	1.379
Jeurys Familia RP	4	2	5.70	**66**	14	0	60.0	63	1.733
Seth Lugo RP	7	4	2.70	61	14	6	80.0	104	0.900
Robert Gsellman RP	2	3	4.66	52	9	1	63.2	60	1.366
Justin Wilson RP	4	2	2.54	45	9	4	39.0	44	1.333
Luis Avilán	4	0	5.06	45	8	0	32.0	30	1.469
Tyler Bashlor	0	3	6.95	24	7	0	22.0	20	1.727
Drew Gagnon	3	1	8.37	18	8	0	23.2	17	1.732
Paul Sewald	1	1	4.58	17	6	1	19.2	22	1.068
Daniel Zamora	0	1	5.19	17	3	0	8.2	8	1.731
Brad Brach	1	1	3.68	16	0	0	14.2	15	1.227
Chris Mazza	1	1	5.51	9	6	0	16.1	11	1.592
Hector Santiago	1	0	6.75	8	6	0	8.0	6	1.875
Brooks Pounders	1	0	6.14	7	3	0	7.1	5	1.500
Stephen Nogosek	0	1	10.80	7	6	0	6.2	6	2.100
Tim Peterson	0	0	4.91	6	2	0	7.1	3	1.909
Jacob Rhame	0	1	4.26	5	3	0	6.1	5	1.895
Corey Oswalt	0	1	12.15	2	0	0	6.2	5	2.250
Ryan O'Rourke	0	0	0.00	2	0	0	1.1	1	2.250
Donnie Hart	0	0	0.00	1	0	0	1.0	0	0.000

== Farm system ==
Level	Team	League	Manager
AAA	Syracuse Mets	International League	Tony DeFrancesco
AA	Binghamton Rumble Ponies	Eastern League	Kevin Boles
A-Advanced	St. Lucie Mets	Florida State League	Chad Kreuter
A	Columbia Fireflies	South Atlantic League	Pedro Lopez
A-Short Season	Brooklyn Cyclones	New York–Penn League	Edgardo Alfonzo
Rookie	Kingsport Mets	Appalachian League	Rich Donnelly
Rookie	GCL Mets	Gulf Coast League	David Davalillo
Rookie	DSL Mets 1	Dominican Summer League	Manny Martínez
Rookie	DSL Mets 2	Dominican Summer League	Yucary De La Cruz
