= Mickey Callaway =

American baseball coach and player (born 1975)

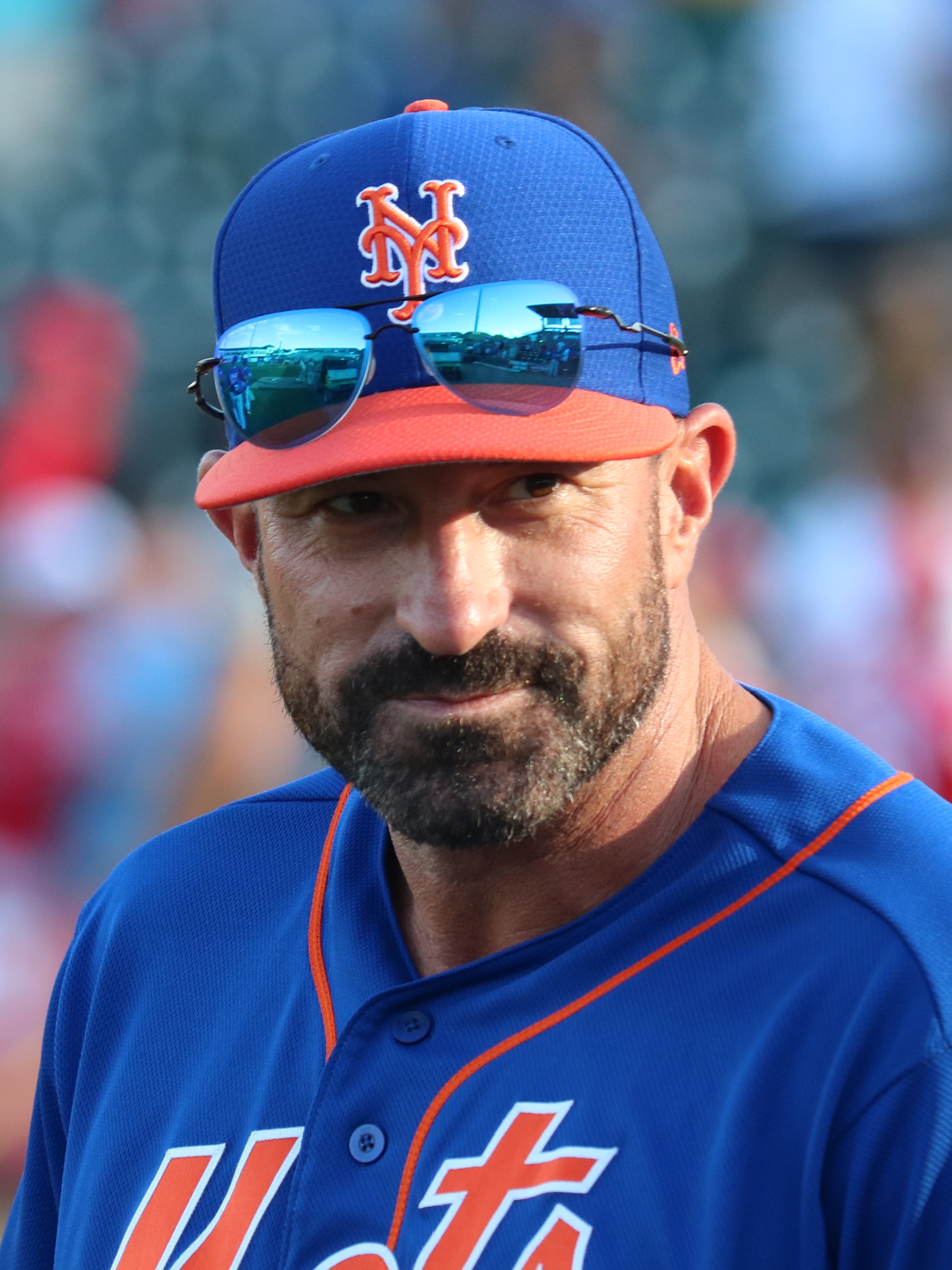
- Callaway with the Mets in 2019
- Pitcher / Manager / Coach
- Born: May 13, 1975 (age 51); Memphis, Tennessee, U.S.
- Batted: Right Threw: Right

Professional debut
- MLB: June 12, 1999, for the Tampa Bay Devil Rays
- KBO: April 3, 2005, for the Hyundai Unicorns
- CPBL: April 2, 2009, for the Uni-President 7-Eleven Lions

Last appearance
- MLB: August 21, 2004, for the Texas Rangers
- KBO: June 6, 2007, for the Hyundai Unicorns
- CPBL: June 28, 2009, for the Uni-President 7-Eleven Lions

MLB statistics
- Win–loss record: 4–11
- Earned run average: 6.27
- Strikeouts: 86
- Managerial record: 163–161
- Winning %: .503

KBO statistics
- Win–loss record: 32–22
- Earned run average: 3.56
- Strikeouts: 222

CPBL statistics
- Win–loss record: 7–3
- Earned run average: 3.18
- Strikeouts: 42
- Stats at Baseball Reference

Teams
- As player: Tampa Bay Devil Rays (1999, 2001); Anaheim Angels (2002–2003); Texas Rangers (2003–2004); Hyundai Unicorns (2005–2007); Uni-President 7-Eleven Lions (2009); As manager: New York Mets (2018–2019); As coach: Cleveland Indians (2013–2017); Los Angeles Angels (2020)

Career highlights and awards
- Taiwan Series champion (2009)

Michael Christopher Callaway (born May 13, 1975) is an American professional baseball coach and former pitcher in Major League Baseball (MLB). He played in MLB for the Tampa Bay Devil Rays, Anaheim Angels, and Texas Rangers and in the KBO League for the Hyundai Unicorns. He was the manager of the New York Mets from 2018 through 2019 and coach for the Cleveland Indians and Los Angeles Angels.

On May 26, 2021, following an investigation into allegations of sexual harassment spanning much of his career as a manager and coach, Callaway was banned from Major League Baseball through at least the end of the 2022 season.

== Early life ==
Callaway attended Germantown High School in Germantown, Tennessee, where he played baseball and basketball. Callaway was drafted out of high school in the 16th round of the 1993 Major League Baseball draft by the San Francisco Giants but did not sign. Callaway attended the University of Mississippi, where he played college baseball for the Ole Miss Rebels.

== Professional career ==
The Tampa Bay Devil Rays selected Callaway in the seventh round of the 1996 Major League Baseball draft. Callaway made his major league debut in 1999 with the Devil Rays. In his debut, he pitched 6 innings for the win and went 2-for-3 with a run batted in. The Devil Rays traded Callaway to the Anaheim Angels for minor leaguer Wilmy Caceres before the 2002 season. He was the Angels fifth starter at the end of the 2002 season when Aaron Sele went down with a shoulder injury. He pitched well down the stretch and earned a World Series ring with the Angels, though he did not appear in any postseason games. He was released by the Angels and then subsequently signed by the Texas Rangers at the end of 2003, and finished his Major League career with them in 2004. After the 2004 season, he played in Asia. From 2005 to 2007, he played for the Hyundai Unicorns in the KBO League where he was a two-time league All-Star.

In 2005 and 2006, he combined for a total of 30 wins (16–9 in 2005 and 14–7 in 2006). After being sidelined by an elbow injury in 2007, Callaway served as the interim Head Coach of Texas A&M International University in 2008. In the 2008–2009 off-season, he signed with the Uni-President 7-Eleven Lions of the Chinese Professional Baseball League, and won his final start to clinch a play-off berth for the team.

== Coaching career ==
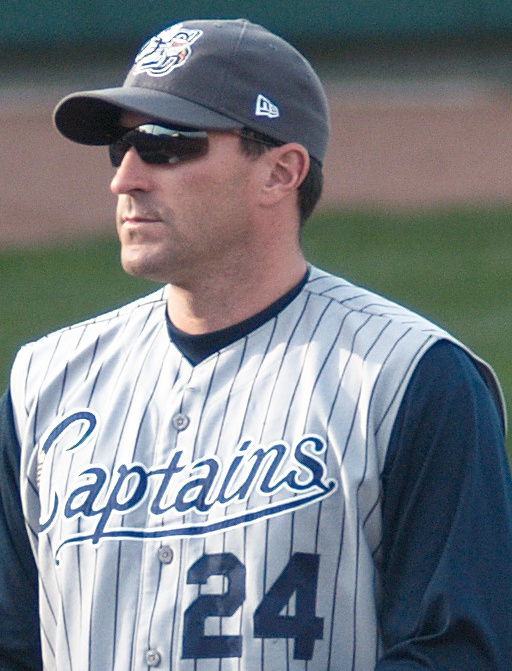
Callaway with the Lake County Captains in 2010

In 2008, Callaway signed with the Laredo Broncos of independent United League Baseball as a player-pitching coach. It would be his last season as a player.

Callaway joined the Cleveland Indians organization in 2010 as the pitching coach for the minor league Lake County Captains, champions of the Midwest League. In 2011, he was the pitching coach for the Carolina League runner-up Kinston Indians.

Callaway became the pitching coach for the Cleveland Indians prior to the 2013 season. In the 2016 World Series, the Indians were defeated by the Cubs in 7 games. Indians manager Terry Francona said Callaway was the reason they went to the World Series. The Indians produced a Cy Young Award winner in 2014 in Corey Kluber. In 2017, the Indians won an AL-best 102 games, but were defeated by the New York Yankees in the American League Division Series. The Indians led the major leagues in both ERA (3.30) and in pitching strikeouts (1,614). It was the fourth consecutive season they led the American League in strikeouts. The club led MLB in curveball usage in Callaway's time as pitching coach.

Callaway was hired by the Los Angeles Angels to be their pitching coach prior to the 2020 season. He was suspended pending an investigation into sexual harassment allegations dating to his time as a coach in Cleveland, and fired soon after MLB banned him from the game for at least two years.

== Managerial career ==
=== New York Mets ===
On October 23, 2017, Callaway was named the manager of the New York Mets. He replaced Terry Collins, who retired at the end of the 2017 season. In his first twelve games, he helped set a franchise record for the best start in club history at 11–1. However, he finished the 2018 season with a disappointing record of 77 wins and 85 losses, failing to reach the postseason. In a May game against the Cincinnati Reds, the Mets batted out of order in the first inning, resulting in an out. Callaway took responsibility for the mistake after the game. He was ejected from a game for the first time in his Major League career on June 12, 2018, for arguing with umpire Stu Scheurwater. Callaway was fined by the Mets after a verbal altercation with a reporter after the Mets' 5–3 loss to the Chicago Cubs on Sunday, June 23, 2019. The Mets finished with an 86–76 record in 2019, unable to secure a playoff spot. The Mets fired Callaway on October 3.

=== Acereros de Monclova ===
On October 6, 2021, Callaway was hired by the Acereros de Monclova to manage their winter league developmental team. In the league's inaugural season, he led the team to a championship, defeating the Pericos de Puebla in the Serie del Príncipe. Callaway was later retained by the organization to manage their summer league club, who compete in the Mexican League (LMB), for the 2022 season. However, he was fired by the team on May 30, 2022, after they started the season with a 16–17 record. He was replaced by Matías Carrillo. In early 2023, Callaway was announced as the team's pitching coach, but was not on the Opening Day roster and later cut ties with the organization.

=== Managerial record ===
As of games played on September 28, 2019.

| Team | Year | Regular season | | | | | Postseason | | | |
| Team | Year | Games | Won | Lost | Win % | Finish | Won | Lost | Win % | Result |
|---|---|---|---|---|---|---|---|---|---|---|
| NYM | 2018 | 162 | 77 | 85 | .475 | 4th in NL East | – | – | – | – |
| NYM | 2019 | 162 | 86 | 76 | .531 | 3rd in NL East | – | – | – | – |
| Total | | 324 | 163 | 161 | .503 | | 0 | 0 | .000 | |

== Sexual harassment allegations ==
On February 1, 2021, The Athletic released an article that detailed allegations of five women against Callaway's "lewd behavior", including sending inappropriate photographs. The allegations spanned five years and three teams. An investigation was launched by MLB the following day. The Angels also announced that Callaway would be suspended while the investigation takes place.

On March 2, 2021, a new report from The Athletic indicated that Cleveland Indians president of baseball operations Chris Antonetti and Indians manager Terry Francona were aware of Callaway's behavior and even discussed it with him at some point. Both defended him on multiple occasions to an angry husband who called in to tell the organization about Callaway harassing his wife. A Cleveland-based attorney brought in by the organization had offered to have Francona call the husband as some way of making amends.

On May 26, 2021, Commissioner Rob Manfred announced that his office's investigation concluded that Callaway had violated MLB policies on harassment. Manfred placed Callaway on MLB's ineligible list for at least two years. He was eligible to apply for reinstatement as of the end of the 2022 season. Callaway expressed remorse for his behavior and expressed hope to return to baseball, but there is no record of him applying for reinstatement as of the 2025 season.
