= Manny Martínez (baseball) =

Dominican baseball player (born 1970)

- Outfielder
- Born: October 3, 1970 (age 55); San Pedro de Macorís, Dominican Republic
- Batted: Right Threw: Right

Professional debut
- MLB: June 14, 1996, for the Seattle Mariners
- KBO: April 5, 2001, for the Samsung Lions

Last appearance
- MLB: October 3, 1999, for the Montreal Expos
- KBO: September 29, 2003, for the LG Twins

MLB statistics
- Batting average: .245
- Home runs: 8
- Runs batted in: 53

KBO statistics
- Batting average: .277
- Home runs: 57
- Runs batted in: 235
- Stats at Baseball Reference

Teams
- Seattle Mariners (1996); Philadelphia Phillies (1996); Pittsburgh Pirates (1998); Montreal Expos (1999); Samsung Lions (2001); LG Twins (2002–2003)

Manuel Martínez DeJesús (born October 3, 1970) is a Dominican baseball coach and former baseball outfielder and manager. He played during three seasons in Major League Baseball (MLB) for the Seattle Mariners, Philadelphia Phillies, Pittsburgh Pirates, and Montreal Expos. He also played three seasons in the Korea Baseball Organization (KBO) for the Samsung Lions and LG Twins. He is currently the bench coach of the DSL Phillies Red.

== Playing career ==
Martínez signed with the Oakland Athletics as an amateur free agent in March 1988. He played his first professional season with the Class A Short Season Southern Oregon A's in 1990. He was named a California League All-Star in 1991, 1992, and 1993. He reached minor league free agency in 1994 and, after a year in the Chicago Cubs organization, signed with the Mariners in 1996. He made his MLB debut on June 15, and, after briefly being sent down to the minors, got his first MLB hit and run batted in (RBI) on June 21, with a double off Brian Keyser of the Kansas City Royals. After nine games with the Mariners, Philadelphia claimed him off waivers in July. He played in 13 games for the Phillies.

In 1997, Martínez did not return to the majors but was named a Pacific Coast League all-star and the most valuable player of the Calgary Cannons, the Triple-A affiliate of the Pirates. He returned to the majors with Pittsburgh on May 5, 1998 and hit his first six MLB home runs that season, including a three-run dinger off Curt Schilling on July 10. Montreal selected him off waivers after the season. He hit a game-winning two-run home run in the 11th inning off Steve Montgomery of the Phillies on May 25, 1999. In his final MLB season, Martínez played in a career-high 137 games, leading the Expos with 19 stolen bases and tying for ninth in the National League with 7 triples. The Expos released him in March 2000, and he played his last affiliated season with Calgary, then a Florida Marlins affiliate, that year. In parts of three MLB seasons with four teams, he appeared in 232 MLB games, batting .245 with eight home runs and 53 RBI.

Martínez spent the 2001 through 2003 seasons playing in KBO in South Korea, where he appeared in 368 games while batting .277 with 57 home runs and 235 RBI. He played in 10 games for the Long Island Ducks of the Atlantic League, batting .282. He also played in the Mexican Baseball League from 2004 through 2008 and in the Dominican Winter League through the 2007–08 season.

== Coaching career ==
Martínez worked as a coach in the New York Mets' organization from 2010 to 2014, then became manager of the Dominican Summer League (DSL) Mets 1 squad in 2015. He held that roles through 2022. Martínez then joined the Dominican affiliates of the Philadelphia Phillies, coaching for DSL Phillies Red in 2023, DSL Phillies White in 2024, and DSL Phillies Red in 2025 and 2026.

== Personal life ==
Martínez and his wife have three children.
