= Tim Peterson (baseball) =

American baseball player (born 1991)

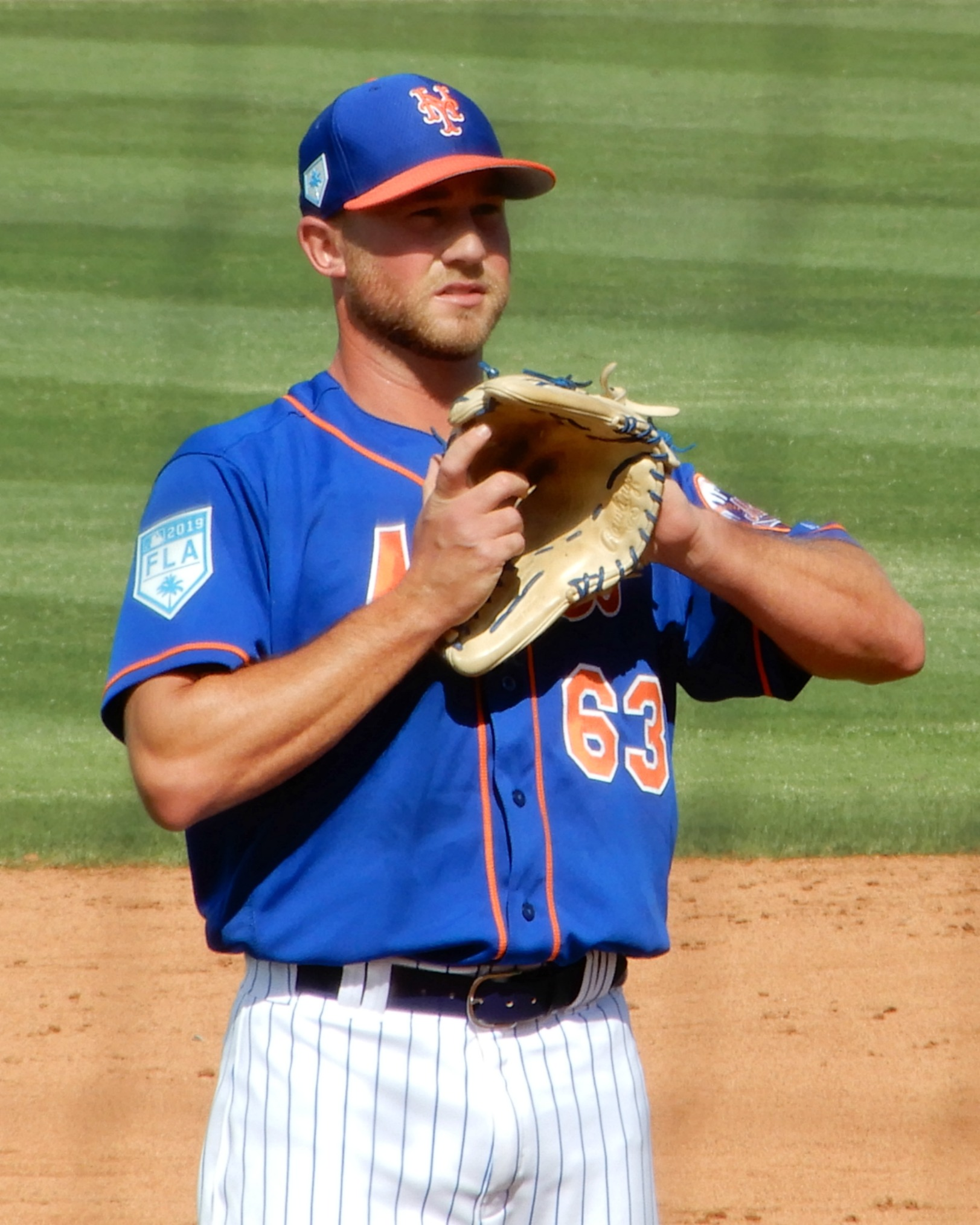
- Peterson with the Mets in 2019
- Pitcher
- Born: February 22, 1991 (age 35); Puyallup, Washington, U.S.
- Batted: Right Threw: Right

MLB debut
- May 30, 2018, for the New York Mets

Last MLB appearance
- June 11, 2019, for the New York Mets

MLB statistics
- Win–loss record: 2–2
- Earned run average: 5.91
- Strikeouts: 28
- Stats at Baseball Reference

Teams
- New York Mets (2018–2019)

Timothy Louis Peterson (born February 22, 1991) is an American former professional baseball pitcher. He played in Major League Baseball (MLB) for the New York Mets.

Peterson's delivery

== Career ==
Peterson graduated from Emerald Ridge High School in Puyallup, Washington and played college baseball at Western Nevada College and the University of Kentucky. In 2012, as a junior at Kentucky, he went 3-0 with a 2.42 ERA in 26 innings.

=== New York Mets ===
Peterson was drafted by the New York Mets in the 20th round (620th overall) of the 2012 Major League Baseball draft and signed.

After signing, Peterson made his professional debut that year with the Brooklyn Cyclones and spent the whole season there, going 1-1 with a 6.26 ERA in 23 innings pitched in relief. In 2013, he pitched 17 2/3 scoreless innings for Brooklyn, and in 18 games pitched for the Savannah Sand Gnats, he was 1-0 with a 5.13 ERA. Peterson began 2014 with Savannah, and after pitching to a 3-0 record and 2.05 ERA in 19 relief appearances, he was promoted to the St. Lucie Mets where he was 2-1 with a 5.70 ERA in 23 2/3 relief innings pitched. He also pitched in one game for the Binghamton Mets at the end of the season. Prior to the 2015 season, Peterson received an 80-game suspension after testing positive for a performance-enhancing drug. After serving his suspension, he played for Savannah where he compiled a 1-0 record and 1.69 ERA in 16 relief appearances. In 2016, he pitched for both St. Lucie and Binghamton, pitching to a 4-1 record and 3.03 ERA in 62 1/3 innings pitched out of the bullpen. In 2017, he pitched two games for the Las Vegas 51s along with 41 games for Binghamton in which he was 5-3 with a 1.14 ERA. He began 2018 with Las Vegas.

Peterson was called up to the majors for the first time on May 30, 2018. He made his debut that night against the Atlanta Braves at SunTrust Park, allowing a home run to Johan Camargo in two innings of work.

Peterson was called up to the majors on May 5, 2019 after starting the season with the Syracuse Mets. He appeared in one game and was sent down the next day on May 6. On August 16, 2019, Peterson was designated for assignment. He elected free agency on October 1.

=== Los Angeles Angels ===
On April 5, 2021, Peterson signed with the Lexington Legends of the Atlantic League of Professional Baseball. On May 18, prior to the ALPB season, Peterson's contract was purchased by the Los Angeles Angels.

=== Wild Health Genomes ===
On April 12, 2022, Peterson signed with the Wild Health Genomes of the Atlantic League of Professional Baseball. In 27 appearances for the Genomes, he posted a 2–1 record and 1.30 ERA with 34 strikeouts across 27 2/3 innings pitched.

=== Leones de Yucatán ===
On July 13, 2022, Peterson's contract was purchased by the Leones de Yucatán of the Mexican League. In 10 games for the team, Peterson worked to a 4.66 ERA with 12 strikeouts and 7 saves in 9 2/3 innings of work. Peterson won the Mexican League Championship with the Leones in 2022.

In 2023, Peterson pitched to a 0–1 record with a 3.24 ERA and 11 strikeouts over 16 2/3 innings of relief.

=== Algodoneros de Unión Laguna ===
On July 3, 2023, Peterson's rights were traded to the Algodoneros de Unión Laguna of the Mexican League. In 7 relief outings, he posted a 4.70 ERA with 5 strikeouts across 7 2/3 innings pitched. On February 26, 2024, Peterson was released by Unión Laguna.

== Coaching career ==
In February 2025, Peterson was named as a development coach for the Dayton Dragons, the High-A affiliate of the Cincinnati Reds.
