= Eric Langill =

Canadian baseball player (born 1979)

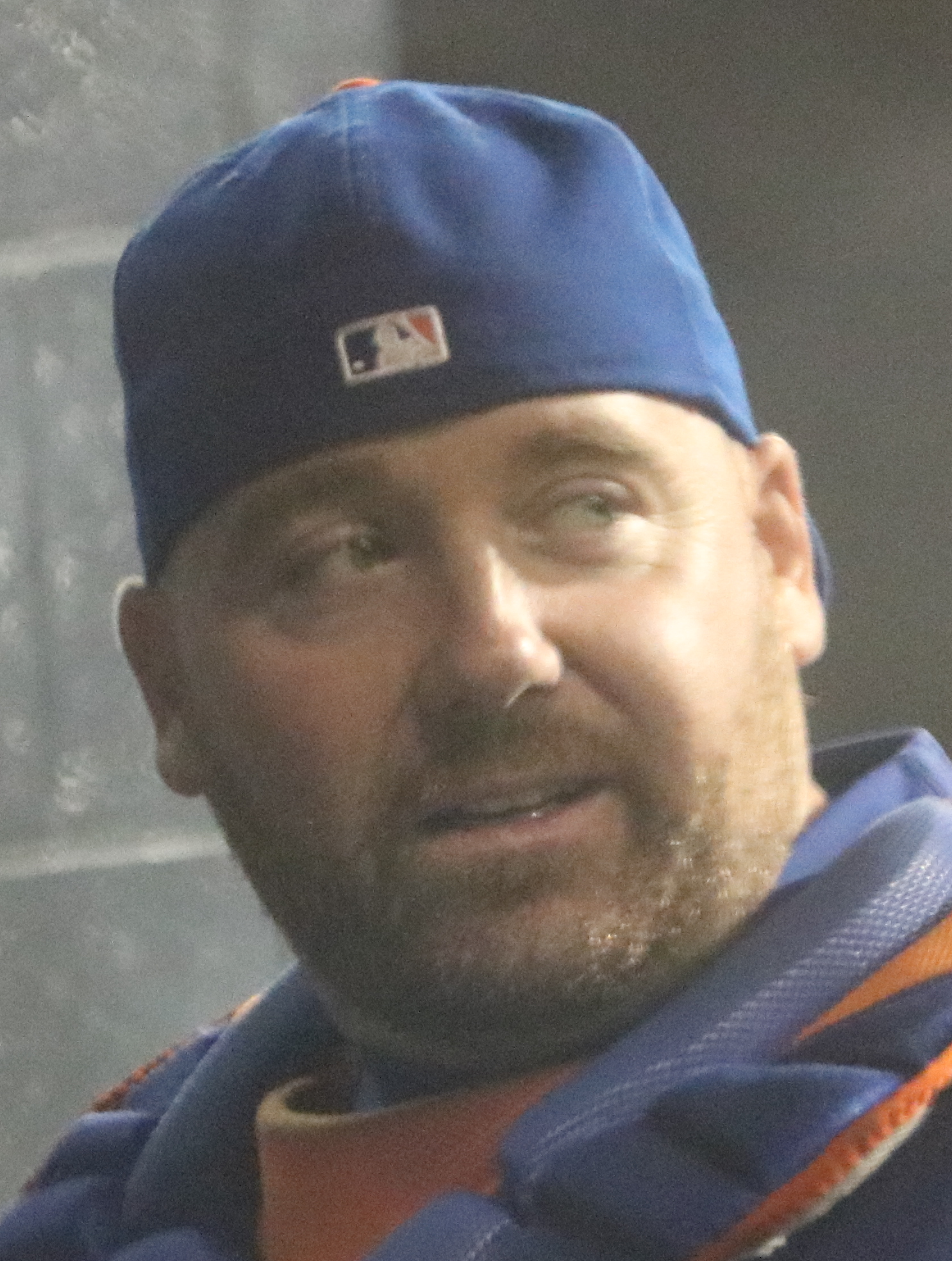
- Langill with the Mets in 2018

New York Mets – No. 78
- Catcher / Bullpen Catcher
- Born: April 9, 1979 (age 46); Kirkland, Quebec, Canada
- Bats: Right Throws: Right

Teams
- New York Mets (2011–present)

Eric Joseph Langill (born April 9, 1979) is a Canadian former professional baseball player who is a bullpen catcher for the New York Mets of Major League Baseball (MLB). Previously, he had played as a catcher in the minor league organizations of the Montreal Expos and Los Angeles Dodgers.

== Early life ==
Langill was born on April 9, 1979, in Kirkland, Quebec. He attended St. Thomas High School in Pointe-Claire, Quebec, where he graduated in 1997. As a child, he played hockey, where he was a second-line Center who was used as a face-off specialist. He grew up idolizing hockey players such as Patrick Roy. In an interview, he attributed his passion for baseball to the Montreal Expos.

== Amateur career ==
Langill, who was always a catcher, played baseball in his youth, ending up on the same junior team as Russell Martin, who was at the time the third baseman. Langill and Martin would later be minor league teammates. Langill did not have the opportunity to play high school baseball, but played during the summer, although his focus on it was secondary to his on hockey. After beginning school at Des Moines Area Community College, Langill now found more opportunities to play baseball instead of hockey.

== Professional career ==
Langill was chosen by the Expos in the 34th round of the 1999 Major League Baseball draft with the 1020th overall pick. Langill began his professional career in the Expos system, making his debut with the Vermont Expos in 2000. He was promoted to Single-A Clinton LumberKings in 2001, before being traded in the offseason to the Los Angeles Dodgers. Langill would play from 2002 to 2006 in the Dodgers system, mostly in AA and AAA. In 2002, Langill pitched the last third of an inning of a game for the South Georgia Waves, getting an out against the one batter he faced. At the request of Grady Little, Langill was invited to major-league Spring Training with the Dodgers in 2006, mainly to act as an extra catcher. He was sent to minor-league camp on March 8. Considered by scouts a career minor-leaguer, Langill, aside from acting as the backup catcher for the Las Vegas 51s, served largely as a mentor to Edwin Bellorín. Langill became known as somewhat of a fan favorite due to his perceived lack of athletic ability combined with his strong passion for the game. In June 2011, Langill joined the New York Mets as a bullpen catcher. On March 30, 2017, Langill started for the Mets' Triple-A affiliate, the Las Vegas 51s, in a game against the major-league team; he led off as designated hitter but went hitless in the game.

== Personal life ==
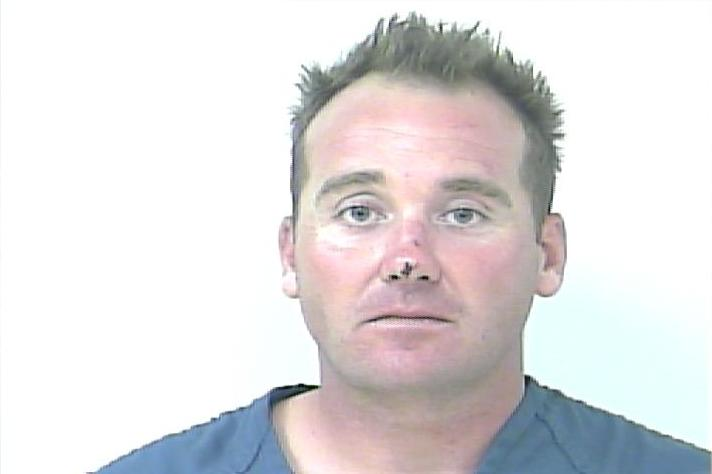
Langill's mugshot after his 2012 arrest

Langill has been a hockey fan since his youth. His favorite team is the Montreal Canadiens.

During 2012 Spring Training, Langill was charged with driving under the influence of alcohol after failing tests conducted after a car crash he was involved in near the Mets Spring Training camp in Port St. Lucie, Florida. Langill had been out after a team bowling night and had told officers he had consumed two or three drinks. Langill had attempted to escape the scene of the collision on foot but was unable to get out of the car, a white Honda Accord, which had flipped upside-down. Langill was eventually helped out of the car through the passenger door. Langill initially told police that the incident had happened when he was cut off by another car while on the way back home from the team bowling event, which according to Mets General Manager Sandy Alderson occurred approximately three hours previously. Langill was held in prison for the night by local authorities. Afterward, Langill was suspended by the team for a week and was required to seek help from the Mets Employee Assistance Program.
