= Jacob Rhame =

American baseball player (born 1993)

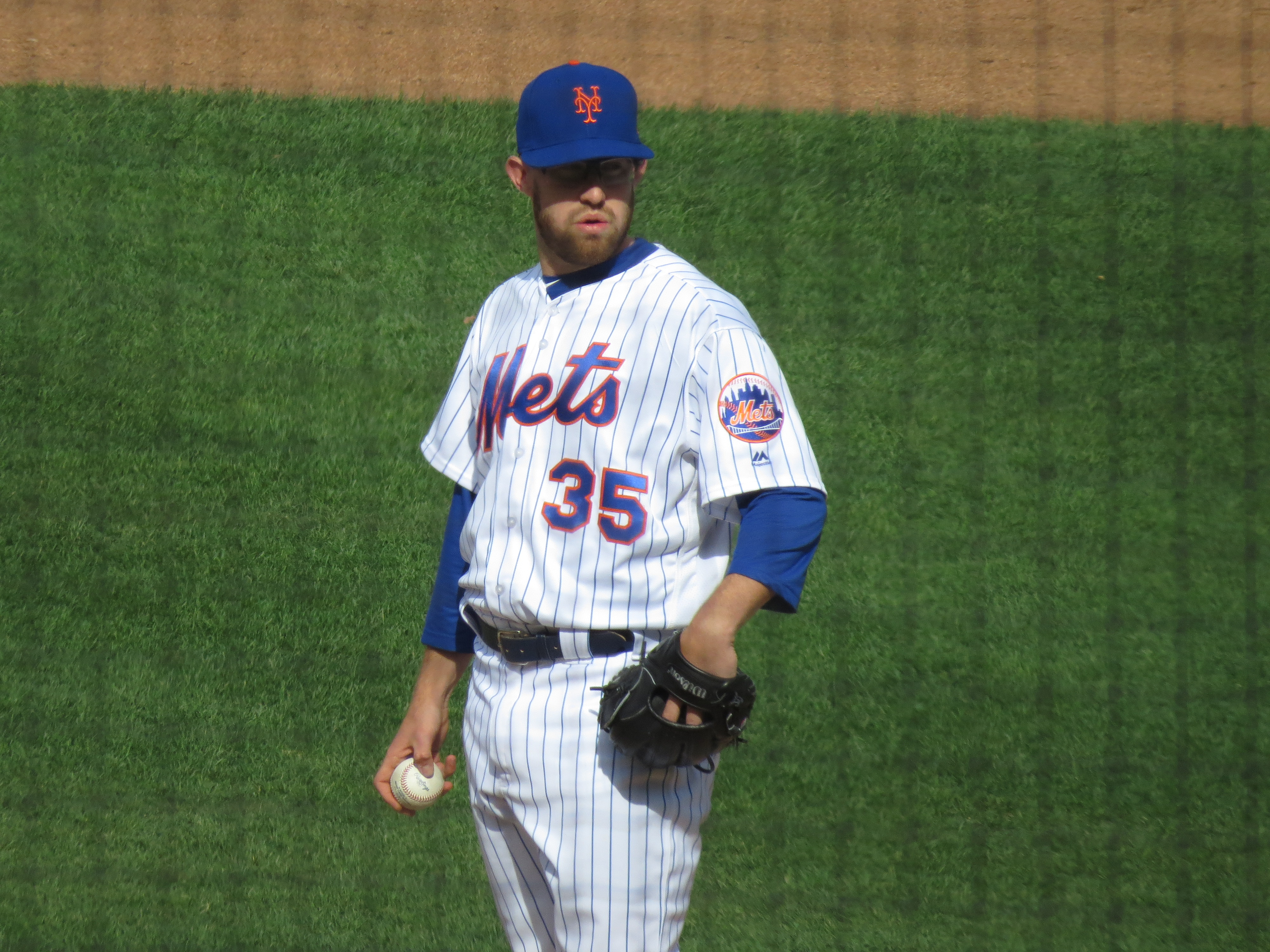
- Rhame with the Mets in 2018
- Pitcher
- Born: March 16, 1993 (age 33); Atlanta, Georgia, U.S.
- Batted: Right Threw: Right

MLB debut
- September 2, 2017, for the New York Mets

Last MLB appearance
- August 3, 2019, for the New York Mets

MLB statistics
- Win–loss record: 2–4
- Earned run average: 6.23
- Strikeouts: 40
- Stats at Baseball Reference

Teams
- New York Mets (2017–2019)

Jacob Alan Rhame (born March 16, 1993) is an American former professional baseball pitcher. He played in Major League Baseball (MLB) for the New York Mets.

== Early life and amateur career ==
Rhame was born in Atlanta to Lee and Rachelle Rhame, one of two children and their only son. Rhame attended John H. Guyer High School in Denton, Texas, and committed to the University of Oklahoma to play college baseball. In his freshman year with the Oklahoma Sooners baseball team, Rhame gained 60 pounds (27 kg), lost velocity on his fastball and posted a 7.20 earned run average (ERA). He was cut from the team and transferred to Grayson County College. Rhame had signed on to transfer to the Texas State Bobcats for the 2014 college baseball season.

== Professional career ==
=== Los Angeles Dodgers ===
The Los Angeles Dodgers selected Rhame in the sixth round of the 2013 Major League Baseball draft. He signed with the Dodgers and made his professional debut with the Ogden Raptors. In 2014, Rhame played for the Great Lakes Loons. He appeared in 51 games and had a 2.01 ERA, 90 strikeouts and nine saves over 67 innings. Rhame was assigned to the Rancho Cucamonga Quakes of the California League to start the 2015 season. He was later promoted to the AA Tulsa Drillers, where he was 3–3 with a 3.06 ERA in 39 games. The Dodgers invited him to major league spring training in 2016 and assigned him to the Triple-A Oklahoma City Dodgers to start the season. He was 1–7 with a 3.29 ERA in 54 appearances and recorded seven saves. The Dodgers added him to their 40-man roster after the season. He appeared in 54 games for Oklahoma City and was 1–7 with a 3.29 ERA.

=== New York Mets ===
On August 20, 2017, the Dodgers sent Rhame to the New York Mets as the player to be named later in the trade that sent Curtis Granderson to the Dodgers. The Mets promoted Rhame to the major leagues on September 1. Rhame made his Major League debut on September 2, 2017 in a scoreless outing against the Houston Astros at Minute Maid Park.

On March 25, 2018, the Mets announced that Rhame had made the Opening Day roster.

On April 23, 2019, Rhame threw a pitch over the head of Rhys Hoskins, causing both benches to clear. Two days later, Rhame received a 2-game suspension. On August 13, 2019, Rhame underwent ulnar nerve transposition surgery, ending his season.

=== Los Angeles Angels ===
On July 8, 2020, Rhame was claimed off waivers by the Los Angeles Angels. He did not play in a game in 2020 due to the cancellation of the minor league season because of the COVID-19 pandemic. Rhame became a free agent on November 2.

=== San Diego Padres ===
On December 14, 2020, Rhame signed a minor league contract with the San Diego Padres organization. On April 28, 2021, Rhame was released by the Padres without appearing in a game for the organization.

=== Cleburne Railroaders ===
On August 23, 2021, Rhame signed with the Cleburne Railroaders of the American Association of Professional Baseball. Rhame started for Cleburne that day, surrendering 5 runs in 1 1/3 innings pitched, and was released by the team the next day.
