= Corey Oswalt =

American baseball player (born 1993)

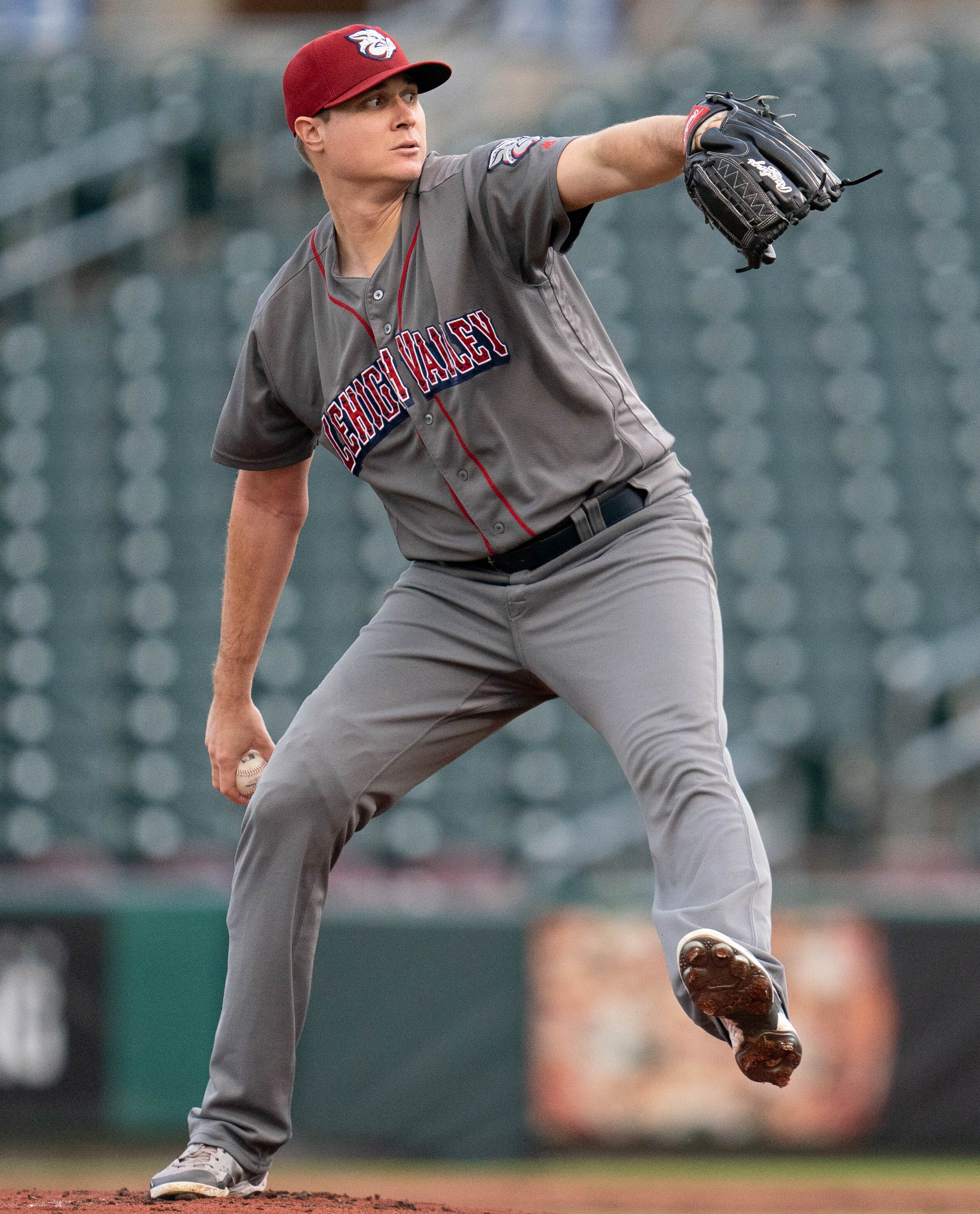
- Oswalt with the Lehigh Valley IronPigs in 2022
- Pitcher
- Born: September 3, 1993 (age 33); San Diego, California, U.S.
- Batted: Right Threw: Right

MLB debut
- April 25, 2018, for the New York Mets

Last MLB appearance
- July 4, 2021, for the New York Mets

MLB statistics
- Win–loss record: 4–5
- Earned run average: 5.89
- Strikeouts: 71
- Stats at Baseball Reference

Teams
- New York Mets (2018–2021)

Corey Edward Oswalt (born September 3, 1993) is an American former professional baseball pitcher. He played in Major League Baseball (MLB) for the New York Mets from 2018 to 2021.

== Career ==
=== Amateur career ===
Oswalt attended James Madison High School in San Diego, California. He was primarily an infielder in high school and initially committed to play college baseball at UC Santa Barbara. Oswalt was drafted by the New York Mets in the seventh round of the 2012 Major League Baseball draft.

=== Professional career ===
Oswalt made his professional debut with the Kingsport Mets and spent all of 2012 with the team, going 4–3 with an 8.15 ERA in 35.1 innings pitched, and he also pitched for them in 2013, compiling an 0–1 record and 3.46 ERA 13 innings. He played for the Brooklyn Cyclones in 2014, finishing 6–2 with a 2.26 ERA in 12 games (11 starts), Savannah Sand Gnats in 2015, going 11-5 with a 3.36 ERA in 25 games, and St. Lucie Mets and Gulf Coast League Mets in 2016, where he pitched to a combined 4–2 record and 4.06 ERA in 14 games (13 starts). After the 2016 season, Oswalt played in the Arizona Fall League. He spent 2017 with the Binghamton Rumble Ponies where he was 12–5 with a 2.28 ERA in 24 games started. The Mets added him to their 40-man roster after the 2017 season.

Oswalt began 2018 with the Las Vegas 51s and was promoted to the Mets on April 21. He made his Major League debut on April 25 at Busch Stadium against the St. Louis Cardinals, pitching 4.2 innings of relief, giving up two runs on two hits while striking out four and walking none in a 9–1 loss. On June 29, 2018, he made his first start for the Mets after Jacob deGrom was scratched. Oswalt only pitched in two games for the Mets in 2019, giving up 9 runs in 6.1 innings pitched. In 2020, Oswalt appeared in 4 games, giving up 7 runs in 13 innings pitched.

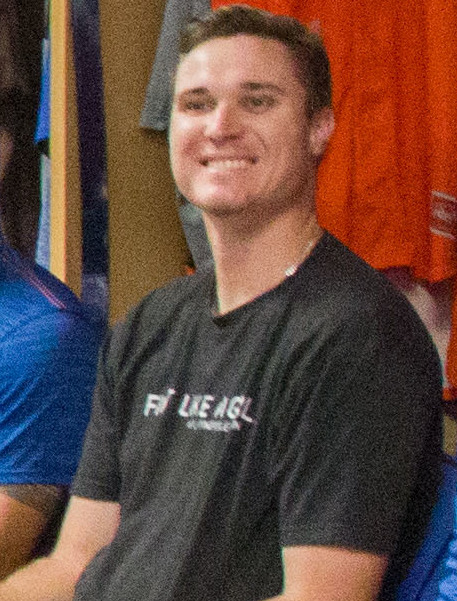
Oswalt at NBT Bank Stadium in 2019

On February 10, 2021, Oswalt was designated for assignment by the Mets after the signing of Albert Almora was made official. On February 16, Oswalt was outrighted and invited to Spring Training as a non-roster invitee. On June 23, Oswalt was selected to the 40-man and active rosters. On July 19, Oswalt was placed on the 60-day injured list with right knee inflammation. Oswalt made 3 appearances for the Mets in 2021, going 1-1 with a 3.48 ERA and 10 strikeouts. On October 29, Oswalt elected free agency.

=== San Francisco Giants ===
On January 14, 2022, Oswalt signed a minor league contract with the San Francisco Giants.

=== Philadelphia Phillies ===
On May 8, 2022, Oswalt was acquired by the Philadelphia Phillies in a reported trade with the Giants for starting pitching depth. He was immediately assigned to the organization's Triple-A affiliate, the Lehigh Valley IronPigs.

=== Colorado Rockies ===
On July 3, 2022, Oswalt was traded to the Colorado Rockies in exchange for cash considerations. In 4 starts for the Triple–A Albuquerque Isotopes, he struggled to a 7.63 ERA with 9 strikeouts across 15 1/3 innings pitched. Oswalt elected free agency following the season on November 10.
