= Daniel Zamora =

American baseball player (born 1993)

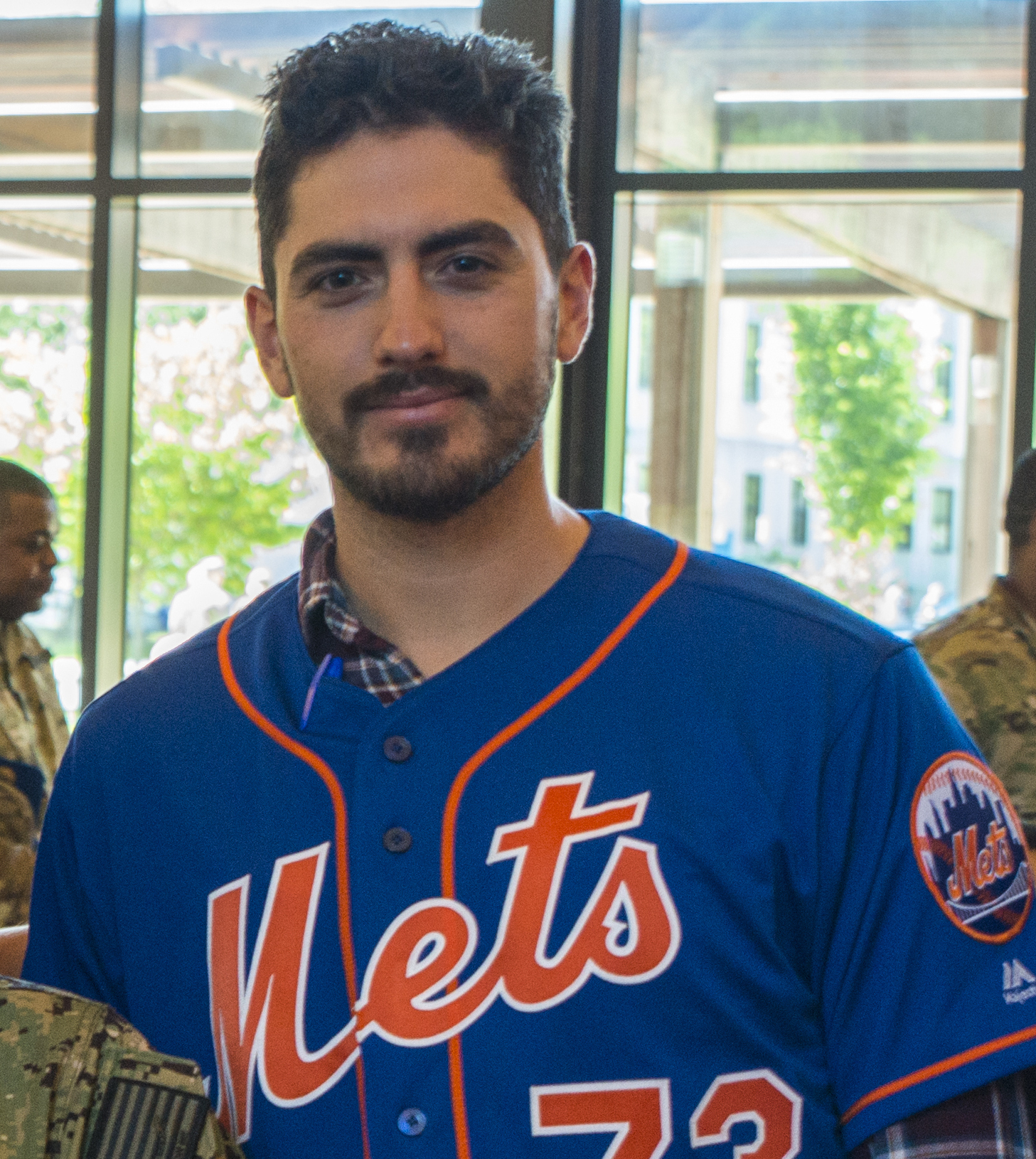
- Zamora with the New York Mets in 2019
- Pitcher
- Born: April 15, 1993 (age 33); Loma Linda, California, U.S.
- Batted: Left Threw: Left

MLB debut
- August 17, 2018, for the New York Mets

Last MLB appearance
- June 4, 2021, for the Seattle Mariners

MLB statistics
- Win–loss record: 3–1
- Earned run average: 4.50
- Strikeouts: 27
- Stats at Baseball Reference

Teams
- New York Mets (2018–2019); Seattle Mariners (2021)

Daniel James Zamora (born April 15, 1993) is an American former professional baseball pitcher. Zamora played college baseball for the Stony Brook Seawolves and was drafted by the Pittsburgh Pirates in the 40th round of the 2015 draft. He later played in Major League Baseball (MLB) for the New York Mets, for whom he made his debut in 2018, and Seattle Mariners.

== Amateur career ==
Zamora attended Bishop Amat High School in La Puente, California. Zamora was selected in the 27th round by the Toronto Blue Jays in the 2012 MLB draft, but did not sign. Instead, he enrolled at Stony Brook University, where he played college baseball for the Stony Brook Seawolves.

Zamora struggled in his freshman year in college, making 14 starts and posting a 5.11 ERA in 75.2 innings. He redshirted his 2014 sophomore season after tearing his labrum and missing the entire year. Making his return a redshirt sophomore in 2015, Zamora was deemed the 'ace' of the Stony Brook rotation, making 13 starts and putting up a 3.00 ERA while striking out 80 in 81 innings. Zamora was named to the America East All-Conference First Team, leading the conference in strikeouts and helping Stony Brook win the conference championship and reach the NCAA tournament. In 2013, he played collegiate summer baseball in the Cape Cod Baseball League for the Orleans Firebirds, and returned to the league in 2015 to play for the Yarmouth-Dennis Red Sox.

== Professional career ==
=== Pittsburgh Pirates ===
The Pittsburgh Pirates selected Zamora in the 40th round of the 2015 MLB draft. He played for the Bradenton Marauders of the High–A Florida State League in 2017, and was named an All-Star. He also played briefly for the Altoona Curve of the Double–A Eastern League.

=== New York Mets ===
The Pirates traded Zamora to the New York Mets for Josh Smoker in January 2018. He began the 2018 season with the Binghamton Rumble Ponies of the Eastern League. The Mets promoted him to the major leagues on August 17. He made his debut that night. He was the first player drafted in the 40th round to make the majors since the draft was shortened to 40 rounds. In his rookie season, Zamora appeared in 16 games, pitching nine innings and striking out 16 with a 3.00 ERA. In 2019 for the Mets, Zamora appeared in 17 games, registering a 5.19 ERA with 8 strikeouts in 8.2 innings of work. He did not appear in a game in the pandemic shortened 2020 season. He was assigned to the Triple-A Syracuse Mets to begin the 2021 season. On May 21, 2021, Zamora was designated for assignment by the Mets.

=== Seattle Mariners ===
On May 22, 2021, Zamora was claimed off waivers by the Seattle Mariners. Zamora split time between the Triple-A Tacoma Rainiers and Seattle, but was designated for assignment on June 24 after struggling to a 6.23 ERA in 4 major league appearances. The next day, Zamora cleared waivers and was sent outright to Triple-A Tacoma.

=== Los Angeles Dodgers ===
On February 21, 2022, Zamora signed with the Toros de Tijuana of the Mexican League.

On March 10, 2022, Zamora signed a minor league contract with the Los Angeles Dodgers. He spent the season with the Triple-A Oklahoma City Dodgers, pitching in 51 games with a 4–2 record, a 3.86 ERA, and 71 strikeouts. Zamora elected free agency following the season on November 10.

=== Pittsburgh Pirates (second stint) ===
On December 11, 2022, Zamora signed a minor league deal with the Pittsburgh Pirates. He spent the year with the Triple–A Indianapolis Indians, also appearing in one game for the Single–A Bradenton Marauders. In 27 games for the Indians, Zamora logged a 4.97 ERA with 32 strikeouts across 29 innings pitched. He elected free agency following the season on November 6, 2023.

On April 7, 2024, Zamora retired from professional baseball.

=== Toros de Tijuana ===
On March 15, 2025, Zamora came out of retirement and signed with the Toros de Tijuana of the Mexican League. In 49 relief appearances, he posted a 2–1 record with a 3.62 ERA and 44 strikeouts across 37 1/3 innings pitched.

On March 16, 2026, Zamora went back into retirement.
