= Tyler Bashlor =

American baseball player (born 1993)

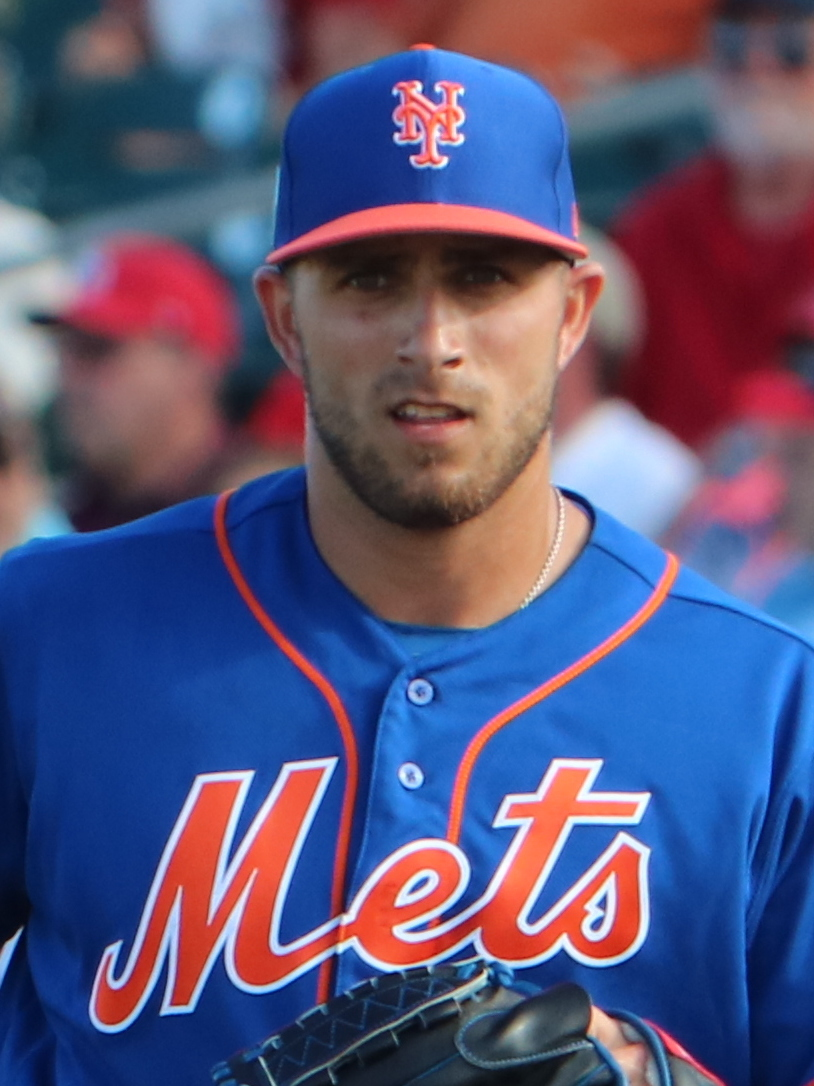
- Bashlor with the Mets in 2019
- Pitcher
- Born: April 16, 1993 (age 33); Springfield, Georgia, U.S.
- Batted: Right Threw: Right

MLB debut
- June 25, 2018, for the New York Mets

Last MLB appearance
- September 9, 2020, for the Pittsburgh Pirates

MLB statistics
- Win–loss record: 0–6
- Earned run average: 5.78
- Strikeouts: 51
- Stats at Baseball Reference

Teams
- New York Mets (2018–2019); Pittsburgh Pirates (2020)

Tyler Morris Bashlor (born April 16, 1993) is an American former professional baseball pitcher. He played in Major League Baseball (MLB) for the New York Mets and Pittsburgh Pirates.

== Career ==
Bashlor grew up in Springfield, Georgia and attended Calvary Day Baptist School in Savannah and played college baseball at South Georgia College. In 2013, his sophomore year at South Georgia, he went 5–3 with a 3.20 ERA and 79 strikeouts in 50 2/3 innings.

=== New York Mets ===
He was drafted by the New York Mets in the 11th round of the 2013 Major League Baseball draft. He signed and made his professional debut with the rookie-level Kingsport Mets, posting a 5.74 ERA with 18 strikeouts in 15 2/3 innings pitched.

Bashlor underwent Tommy John surgery in 2014 and missed both that year and the 2015 season. He made his return in 2016 with the Single-A Columbia Fireflies and was promoted to the High-A St. Lucie Mets during the season. In 38 relief appearances between the two affiliates, Bashlor went 4–3 with a 2.75 ERA, 73 strikeouts, and a 1.24 WHIP. He pitched 2017 with St. Lucie and the Double-A Binghamton Rumble Ponies, compiling a combined 3–2 record and 3.44 ERA with 84 strikeouts across 49 2/3 total innings pitched between the two affiliates. On November 20, 2017, the Mets added Bashlor to their 40-man roster to protect him from the Rule 5 draft.

Bashlor began the 2018 campaign back with Double-A Binghamton. The Mets promoted him to the major leagues for the first time on June 25, 2018. Bashlor made his Major League debut that day at Citi Field against the Pittsburgh Pirates. In two innings, he allowed only one walk and a subsequent hit, a home run by Josh Bell. Bashlor made 24 appearances for the Mets during his rookie campaign, compiling an 0–3 record and 4.22 ERA with 25 strikeouts over 32 innings of work.

Bashlor made another 24 appearances for New York during the 2019 season, but struggled to an 0–3 record and 6.95 ERA with 20 strikeouts over 22 innings of work. Bashlor was designated for assignment following the promotion of David Peterson on July 28, 2020.

=== Pittsburgh Pirates ===
On August 2, 2020, Bashlor was traded to the Pittsburgh Pirates in exchange for cash considerations. On September 11, with just a few weeks left of the season, he was placed on the 10-day injured list with low back inflammation. At the time of his injury, Bashlor had struggled to an 8.64 ERA with six strikeouts in 8 1/3 innings pitched.

On April 4, 2021, Bashlor was designated for assignment to make room on the roster for Wilmer Difo. Bashlor was released by the Pirates the same day. He was re-signed to a minor league contract and sent to the Pirates' alternate training site on April 10. In 37 appearances out of the bullpen, Bashlor compiled a 1–2 record and 2.39 ERA with 45 strikeouts and six saves across 37 2/3 innings pitched. Bashlor elected free agency following the season on November 7.

=== Minnesota Twins ===
On March 30, 2022, Bashlor signed a minor league contract with the Minnesota Twins organization. In eight appearances split between the rookie-level Florida Complex League Twins and Triple-A St. Paul Saints, he logged a cumulative 2–1 record and 3.38 ERA with seven strikeouts over eight innings of work. Bashlor was released by the Twins organization on July 16.
