= Dominican Summer League Mets =

Dominican Summer League Mets Orange
- Boca Chica

Minor league affiliations
- Class: Rookie
- League: Dominican Summer League
- Division: South

Major league affiliations
- Team: New York Mets

Minor league titles
- League titles (1): 1994*; *As DSL Mets

Team data
- Name: Mets
- Ballpark: New York Mets Complex
- Owner/ Operator: New York Mets
- Manager: JC Rodriguez

Dominican Summer League Mets Blue
- Boca Chica

Minor league affiliations
- Class: Rookie
- League: Dominican Summer League
- Division: Southeast

Major league affiliations
- Team: New York Mets

Minor league titles
- League titles (0): None

Team data
- Name: Mets
- Ballpark: New York Mets Complex
- Owner/ Operator: New York Mets
- Manager: Felix Fermin Jr.

After withdrawing their affiliate from the Venezuelan Summer League, the Major League Baseball's New York Mets have had two affiliates in the Dominican Summer League since the 2010 season. The DSL Mets Orange play in the South division while the DSL Mets Blue play in the Southeast division.

== Rosters ==
Dominican Summer League Mets Blue roster
Players		Coaches/Other
Pitchers: 65 Greison Acosta; 55 Yunior Canario; 56 Isaac De La Cruz; 62 Cristian Dudamel; 27 Enmanuel Feliz; 78 Victor Gallegos; 49 Sebastian Gomez; 81 Cristopher Hernandez; 80 Oscar Montero; 63 Wranigher Navas; 38 Mauricio Nunez; 40 Jhony Osoria; 58 Eduardo Pina; 77 Edgardo Rodriguez; 48 Leyvi Rodriguez; 10 Gensil Rosario; 83 Arnaldo Tejada; 29 Alsy Torres; 82 Josbel Torrez; 39 Maykol Vasquez	Catchers: 13 Jesus Griman; 85 Adrian La Rosa; 15 Adrian Silva; Infielders: 11 Cristopher Jaquez; 12 Jesus Minaya; 3 Angel Osuna; 30 Oscar Pena; Outfielders: 23 Emerson Estevez; 9 Yeremy Reyes; 20 Ryan Rudas; 4 Elvis Teran	Manager: -- J.C. Rodriguez; Coaches: -- Dan Cataline (hitting); -- Juan Martinez (pitching); 60-day injured list: 78 Angel Montero; 3 Georwill Rodriguez; 54 Giomar Ubiera; 7-day injured list; * On New York Mets 40-man roster; ~ Development list; # Rehab assignment; ∞ Reserve list; ‡ Restricted list; § Suspended list; † Temporarily inactive list; Roster updated September 23, 2026; Transactions; → More rosters: MiLB • Dominican Summer League; → New York Mets minor league players

Dominican Summer League Mets Orange roster
Players		Coaches/Other
Pitchers: 39 Olmedo Barria; 34 Aurelvys Batista; -- Randy Gutierrez; 64 Randy Guzman; 52 Maxgregori Harvey; 57 Henderson Hernandez; 20 Frandy Lora; 11 Jhoangel Marquez; 65 Esteban Mejia; 22 Abner Meza; 48 Cesar Morales; 60 Anderson Ozuna; 61 Jorarlin Perez; 33 Derlin Rojas; 67 Yobanny Sanchez; 25 Biguey Santana; 66 Arturo Sevilla; 71 Randiel Vicente; 45 Jose Vielma	Catchers: 28 Cesar Acosta; 4 Yadier Fuentes; 1 Frank Moreno; 32 Jose Serracin; Infielders: 15 Wandy Asigen; -- Michelle Mercedes; 51 Dayron Oramas; 2 Jose Padilla; 30 Johnderis Sanchez; 59 Sebastian Toro; Outfielders: 50 Aiberson Blanco; -- Royner Bravo; 3 Jhonael Cuello; 26 Anthony Delgado; 49 Henry Manrique; 13 Cleiner Ramirez; 55 Jonnhan Sanchez	Manager: -- Felix Fermin Jr.; Coaches: -- Miguel Alfonseca (pitching); -- Jose Mena (hitting); 60-day injured list: 75 Cristopher Del Orbe; -- Darling Perez; 7-day injured list; * On New York Mets 40-man roster; ~ Development list; # Rehab assignment; ∞ Reserve list; ‡ Restricted list; § Suspended list; † Temporarily inactive list; Roster updated October 21, 2026; Transactions; → More rosters: MiLB • Dominican Summer League; → New York Mets minor league players
