= List of New York Mets team records =

This is a list of team records for the New York Mets baseball team.

== Career records ==
=== Batting ===
Career batting records
| Statistic | Player | Record | Mets career | Ref |
|---|---|---|---|---|
| Batting average | John Olerud | .354 | 1997–1999 | |
| On-base percentage | John Olerud | .425 | 1997–1999 | |
| Slugging percentage | Mike Piazza | .542 | 1998–2005 | |
| On-base plus slugging | John Olerud | .926 | 1997–1999 | |
| Games played | Ed Kranepool | 1,853 | 1962–1979 | |
| At bats | David Wright | 5,996 | 2004–2016, 2018 | |
| Runs scored | David Wright | 946 | 2004–2016, 2018 | |
| Hits | David Wright | 1,777 | 2004–2016, 2018 | |
| Total bases | David Wright | 2,945 | 2004–2016, 2018 | |
| Doubles | David Wright | 390 | 2004–2016, 2018 | |
| Triples | José Reyes | 112 | 2003–2011, 2016–2018 | |
| Home runs | Pete Alonso | 264 | 2019–2025 | |
| Runs batted in | David Wright | 970 | 2004–2016, 2018 | |
| Bases on balls | David Wright | 761 | 2004–2016, 2018 | |
| Strikeouts | David Wright | 1,292 | 2004–2016, 2018 | |
| Stolen bases | José Reyes | 408 | 2003–2011, 2016–18 | |
| Singles | David Wright | 1,119 | 2004–2016, 2018 | |
| Runs created | David Wright | 929 | 2004–2016, 2018 | |
| Extra-base hits | David Wright | 541 | 2004–2016, 2018 | |
| Times on base | David Wright | 1,993 | 2004–2016, 2018 | |
| Hit by pitch | Pete Alonso | 85 | 2019–2025 | |
| Sacrifice flies | David Wright | 59 | 2004–2016, 2018 | |
| Intentional walks | Darryl Strawberry | 108 | 1983–1990 | |
| Grounded into double plays | Ed Kranepool | 138 | 1962–1979 | |
| Lead-off home runs | Jose Reyes | 19 | 2003–2011, 2016–2018 | |
| At bats per strikeout | Félix Millán | 29.1 | 1973–1977 | |
| At bats per home run | Pete Alonso | 13.9 | 2019–2024 | |
| Outs made | Ed Kranepool | 4,276 | 1962–1979 | |
| Grand slams | Mike Piazza | 6 | 1998–2005 | |
| Walk-off runs batted in | Wilmer Flores | 10 | 2013–2018 | |

=== Pitching ===
Career pitching records
| Statistic | Player | Record | Mets career | Ref |
|---|---|---|---|---|
| ERA | Jacob deGrom | 2.49 | 2014-2022 | Example |
| Wins | Tom Seaver | 198 | 1967-1977, 1983 | Example |
| Win–loss Percentage | Dwight Gooden | .649 | 1984-1994 | Example |
| Walks plus hits per inning pitched | Jacob deGrom | 0.998 | 2014-2022 | Example |
| Hits Allowed/9 Innings Pitched | Nolan Ryan | 6.51 | 1966, 1968-1971 | Example |
| Walks/9 Innings Pitched | Bret Saberhagen | 1.32 | 1992-1995 | Example |
| Strikeouts/9 Innings Pitched | Jacob deGrom | 10.776 | 2014-2022 | Example |
| Games | John Franco | 695 | 1990-2001, 2003-2004 | Example |
| Saves | John Franco | 276 | 1990-2001, 2003-2004 | Example |
| Innings Pitched | Tom Seaver | 3,045.1 | 1967-1977, 1983 | Example |
| Strikeouts | Tom Seaver | 2,541 | 1967-1977, 1983 | Example |
| Games Started | Tom Seaver | 395 | 1967-1977, 1983 | Example |
| Complete Games | Tom Seaver | 171 | 1967-1977, 1983 | Example |
| Shutouts | Tom Seaver | 44 | 1967-1977, 1983 | Example |
| Home Runs Allowed | Tom Seaver | 212 | 1967-1977, 1983 | Example |
| Bases on Balls Allowed | Tom Seaver | 847 | 1967-1977, 1983 | Example |
| Hits Allowed | Tom Seaver | 2,431 | 1967-1977, 1983 | Example |
| Strikeout to Walk | Jacob deGrom | 5.22 | 2014-2022 | Example |
| Losses | Jerry Koosman | 137 | 1967-1978 | Example |
| Earned Runs Allowed | Jerry Koosman | 875 | 1967-1978 | Example |
| Wild Pitches | Tom Seaver | 81 | 1967-1977, 1983 | Example |
| Hit Batsmen | Al Leiter | 63 | 1998-2004 | Example |
| Batters Faced: | Tom Seaver | 12,191 | 1967-1977, 1983 | Example |
| Games Finished | John Franco | 484 | 1990-2001, 2003-2004 | Example |
| Consecutive Decisions as a Starting Pitcher (as of June 19, 2015). | Bartolo Colón | 26 | 2014-2016 | Example |

== Single season records ==
=== Batting ===
Single season batting records
| Record Name | Player | Record | Year | Reference |
|---|---|---|---|---|
| Batting Average | John Olerud | .354 | 1998 | Example |
| On-Base Percentage: | John Olerud | .447 | 1998 | Example |
| Slugging Percentage | Mike Piazza | .614 | 2000 | Example |
| OPS | Mike Piazza | 1.024 | 1998 | Example |
| At Bats | José Reyes | 696 | 2005 | Example |
| Plate Appearances | José Reyes | 765 | 2007 | Example |
| Runs | Carlos Beltrán | 127 | 2006 | Example |
| Hits | Lance Johnson | 227 | 1996 | Example |
| Total Bases | Pete Alonso | 348 | 2019 | Example |
| Doubles | Bernard Gilkey | 44 | 1996 | Example |
| Triple | Lance Johnson | 21 | 1996 | Example |
| Home Runs | Pete Alonso | 53 | 2019 | Example |
| Runs Batted In | Pete Alonso | 131 | 2022 | Example |
| Bases on Balls | John Olerud | 125 | 1999 | Example |
| Stolen Bases | José Reyes | 78 | 2007 | Example |
| Singles | Lance Johnson | 166 | 1996 | Example |
| Runs Created | John Olerud | 138 | 1998 | Example |
| Extra Base Hits | Pete Alonso | 85 | 2019 | Example |
| Times on Base | John Olerud | 309 | 1999 | Example |
| Hit By Pitch | Mark Canha | 27 | 2022 | Example |
| Sacrifice Hits | Félix Millán | 24 | 1974 | Example |
| Intentional Walks | Howard Johnson | 25 | 1988 | Example |
| Grounded into Double Plays | Mike Piazza | 27 | 1999 | Example |
| At Bats per Strikeout | Félix Millán | 37.0 | Example | Example |
| At Bats per Home Run | Pete Alonso | 11.3 | 2019 | Example |

=== Pitching ===
Single season pitching records
| Statistic | Player | Record | Year | Ref |
|---|---|---|---|---|
| ERA (Earned Run Average) | Dwight Gooden | 1.53 | 1985 | Example |
| Wins | Tom Seaver | 25 | 1969 | Example |
| Win–loss Percentage | Terry Leach | .917 | 1987 | Example |
| Walks Plus Hits per Inning Pitched | Jacob deGrom | 0.912 | 2018 | Example |
| Hits Allowed/9 Innings Pitched | Sid Fernandez | 5.71 | 1985 | Example |
| *Walks Allowed/9 Innings Pitched | Bret Saberhagen | .66 | 1994 | Example |
| *Games | Pedro Feliciano | 92 | 2010 | Example |
| Saves | Jeurys Familia | 51 | 2016 | Example |
| Innings Pitched | Tom Seaver | 290.2 | 1970 | Example |
| Strikeouts | Tom Seaver | 289 | 1971 | Example |
| Complete Games | Tom Seaver | 21 | 1971 | Example |
| Shutouts | Dwight Gooden | 8 | 1985 | Example |
| Home Runs Allowed | Roger Craig | 35 | 1962 | Example |
| Bases on Balls Allowed | Nolan Ryan | 116 | 1971 | Example |
| Hits Allowed | Roger Craig | 261 | 1962 | Example |
| Strikeout to Walk | Bret Saberhagen | 11 | 1994 | Example |
| Earned Runs Allowed | Roger Craig | 117 | 1962 | Example |
| Wild Pitches | Jack Hamilton | 18 | 1966 | Example |
| Hit Batsmen | Pedro Astacio | 16 | 2002 | Example |
| Batters Faced | Tom Seaver | 1,173 | 1970 | Example |
| Games Finished | Armando Benítez | 68 | 2000 | Example |
| WAR for Pitchers | Dwight Gooden | 12.2 | 1985 | Example |

== Single game records ==
=== Batting ===
Single game batting records
| Statistic | Player | Record | Year | Ref |
|---|---|---|---|---|
| Most Hits | Edgardo Alfonzo; Wilmer Flores | 6 | 1999; 2016 | Example |
| Most At-bats | David Schneck | 11 | (1974, 25 innings) | Example |
| *Most Runs Scored | Edgardo Alfonzo | 6 | 1999 | Example |
| Most Doubles | 21 players have achieved this the latest being Jeff McNeil | 3 | 2022 | Example |
| Most Triples | Doug Flynn | 3 | 1980 | Example |
| Most Home runs | Jim Hickman; Dave Kingman; Claudell Washington; Darryl Strawberry; Gary Carter; Edgardo Alfonzo; Jose Reyes; Carlos Beltran; Ike Davis; Kirk Nieuwenhuis; Lucas Duda; Yoenis Cespedes (twice); Robinson Cano; Francisco Lindor. | 3 | Example | Example |
| Most Runs Batted In | Carlos Delgado Brandon Nimmo | 9 | 2008 2025 | Example |
| Most Walks | Mike Baxter | 5 | August 4, 2012 | Example |
| Most Intentional Walks | Todd Hundley | 3 | 1997 | Example |
| Most Stolen Bases | Vince Coleman; Roger Cedeño | 4 | 1992 and 1993; 1999 | Example |

=== Pitching ===
Single game pitching records
| Statistic | Player | Record | Year | Ref |
|---|---|---|---|---|
| Most Innings Pitched | Rob Gardner; Al Jackson | 15 | 1965; 1962 | Example |
| Most Strikeouts | David Cone; Tom Seaver | 19 | 1991; 1970 | Example |
| Most Strikeouts in Major League debut | Matt Harvey | 11 | July 26, 2012 | Example |
| Most Walks | Mike Torrez | 10 | 1983 | Example |
| Most Home runs allowed | Roger Craig | 5 | 1963 | Example |
| Most Runs allowed | Orlando Hernandez | 11 | 2006 | Example |
| Fewest hits allowed (one pitcher - complete game) | Johan Santana | 0 | June 1, 2012 | Example |
| Fewest hits allowed (combined - 9 innings) | Tylor Megill, Drew Smith, Joely Rodriguez, Seth Lugo, and Edwin Diaz | 0 | April 29, 2022 | Example |

== See also ==
- Baseball statistics
- List of Major League Baseball franchise postseason streaks
- New York Mets award winners and league leaders
