= New York Mets award winners and league leaders =

This is a list of award winners and league leaders for the New York Mets professional baseball team.

== Team award ==
- 1969 – National League Championship Series Trophy
- 1969 – World Series Trophy
- 1973 – National League Championship Series Trophy
- 1983 – Baseball America Organization of the Year
- 1984 – Baseball America Organization of the Year
- 1986 – National League Championship Series Trophy
- 1986 – Commissioner's Trophy (World Series)
- 1995 – Baseball America Organization of the Year
- 2000 – Warren Giles Trophy (National League champion)
- 2015 – Warren Giles Trophy (National League champion)

== Team captains ==
- Keith Hernandez, 1987–89 (co-captain with Gary Carter, 1988–89)
- Gary Carter, 1988–89 (co-captain with Keith Hernandez)
- John Franco, 2001–04
- David Wright, 2013–18

== Individual awards ==
=== Cy Young Award ===
- Tom Seaver, 1969, 1973, 1975
- Dwight Gooden, 1985
- R. A. Dickey, 2012
- Jacob deGrom, 2018, 2019

=== Rookie of the Year Award ===
- Tom Seaver, 1967
- Jon Matlack, 1972
- Darryl Strawberry, 1983
- Dwight Gooden, 1984
- Jacob deGrom, 2014
- Pete Alonso, 2019

=== Associated Press Manager of the Year Award (discontinued) ===
- Gil Hodges 1969

=== Manager of the Year Award ===
- Buck Showalter (2022)

=== Hank Aaron Award (top hitter in league) ===
None

=== HR Leader (NL) ===
- Dave Kingman, 1982
- Darryl Strawberry, 1988
- Howard Johnson, 1991
- Pete Alonso, 2019

=== RBI Leader (NL) ===
- Howard Johnson, 1991
- Pete Alonso, 2022

=== Batting Title (NL) ===
- Jose Reyes, 2011
- Jeff McNeil, 2022

=== Gold Glove Award ===
Pitcher

- Ron Darling, 1989
- Nolan McLean, 2026

Catcher

none

First base

- Keith Hernandez, 1983–1988

Second base

- Doug Flynn, 1980

Shortstop

- Bud Harrelson, 1971
- Rey Ordóñez, 1997–1999

Third base

- Robin Ventura, 1999
- David Wright, 2007, 2008

Outfield

- Tommie Agee, 1970
- Carlos Beltrán, 2006–2008
- Juan Lagares, 2014

=== Wilson Defensive Player of the Year Award ===
See explanatory note at Atlanta Braves award winners and league leaders
Team (all positions)

- David Wright (2012)
- Juan Lagares (2013)

Pitcher (in MLB)

- Jacob deGrom (2015)

=== Silver Slugger Award ===
Pitcher

- Dwight Gooden, 1992
- Mike Hampton, 2000

Catcher

- Gary Carter, 1985, 1986
- Mike Piazza, 1998–2002

First base

- Keith Hernandez, 1984
- Pete Alonso, 2025

Second base

- Edgardo Alfonzo, 1999
- Jeff McNeil, 2022

Shortstop

- José Reyes, 2006
- Francisco Lindor, 2023, 2024

Third base

- Howard Johnson, 1989, 1991
- David Wright, 2007, 2008

Outfield

- Darryl Strawberry, 1988, 1990
- Carlos Beltrán, 2006–2007
- Yoenis Cespedes, 2016
- Juan Soto, 2025

=== All-MLB Team ===
==== First team ====
- Pete Alonso (1B), 2019
- Jacob deGrom (SP), 2019, 2020
- Edwin Díaz (RP), 2022
- Juan Soto (OF), 2025

==== Second team ====
- Michael Conforto (OF), 2020
- Edwin Díaz (RP), 2025
- Francisco Lindor (SS), 2022, 2023, 2024
- Max Scherzer (SP), 2022

=== Rolaids Relief Man of the Year Award ===
See footnote

- John Franco, 1990
- Armando Benítez, 2001

=== MLB Reliever of the Year Award ===
- Edwin Díaz, 2022, 2025

=== MLB Triple Crown: Pitching ===
- Dwight Gooden (1985)

=== Triple Crown (NL): Pitching ===
- Dwight Gooden (1985)

=== MLB Comeback Player of the Year Award ===
- Ray Knight, 1986
- Rickey Henderson, 1999
- Matt Harvey, 2015

=== Roberto Clemente Award ===
- Gary Carter, 1989
- Al Leiter, 2000
- Carlos Delgado, 2006
- Curtis Granderson, 2016

=== World Series MVP Award ===
- Donn Clendenon, 1969
- Ray Knight, 1986

=== NLCS MVP Award ===
See: National League Championship Series#NLCS results (1969–present) (Series MVP column)

- Mike Hampton, 2000
- Daniel Murphy, 2015

=== Major League Baseball All-Star Game MVP Award ===
Note: This was re-named the Ted Williams Most Valuable Player Award in 2002.

- Jon Matlack, 1975 (shared with Bill Madlock)

=== DHL Hometown Heroes (2006) ===
- Tom Seaver — voted by MLB fans as the most outstanding player in the history of the franchise, based on on-field performance, leadership quality and character value

=== Sports Illustrated MLB All-Decade Team ===
- Carlos Beltrán, centerfield (2009) (also played with Kansas City and Houston, 2000-04)
- Johan Santana, starting pitcher (2009) (also played with Minnesota, 2000-07)
- Robinson Canó, second base (2019) (also played with New York and Seattle, 2010–2018)

=== Players Choice Awards Outstanding Pitcher (NL) ===
- R. A. Dickey (2012)
- Jacob deGrom (2018 & 2019)

=== The Sporting News Reliever of the Year Award ===
==== Reliever of the Year Award (starting in 2001) ====
- Armando Benítez, 2001 (shared with Robb Nen)

==== Fireman of the Year Award (last awarded in 2000) ====
- John Franco, 1990 & 1994

=== Players Choice Awards Outstanding Rookie (NL) ===
- Jacob DeGrom (2014)

=== Baseball America All-Rookie Team ===
See: Baseball America#Baseball America All-Rookie Team

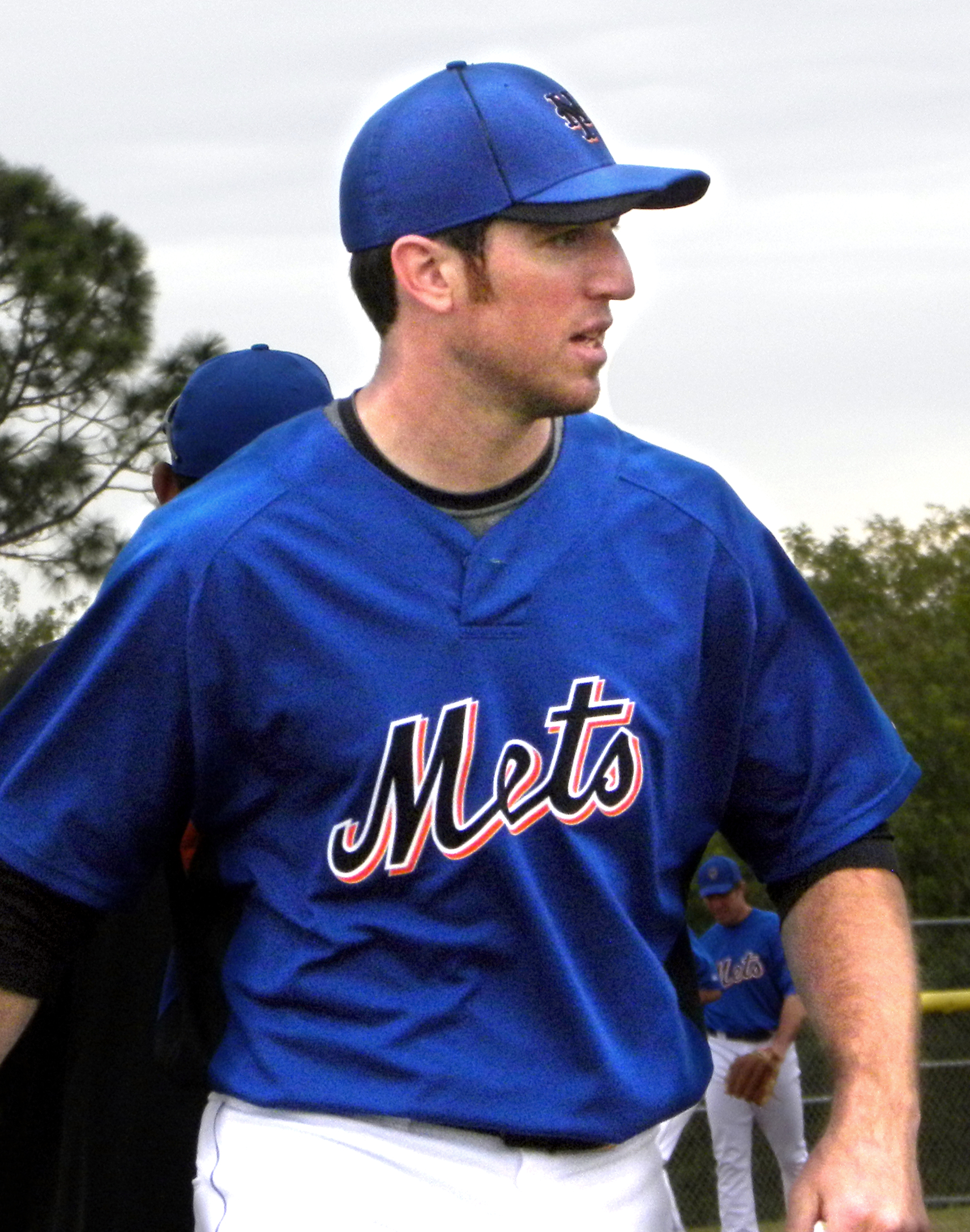
Ike Davis

- 2010 – Ike Davis (1B) and Jon Niese (SP)
- 2011 – Lucas Duda, OF (one of three)

=== Topps All-Star Rookie teams ===
- 1962 Al Jackson - LHP
- 1963 Jesse Gonder - C
- 1965 Ron Swoboda - OF
- 1966 Cleon Jones - OF
- 1967 Tom Seaver - RHP
- 1968 Ken Boswell - 2B
- 1968 Jerry Koosman - LHP
- 1972 Jon Matlack - LHP
- 1981 Hubie Brooks - 3B
- 1981 Mookie Wilson - OF
- 1983 Darryl Strawberry - OF
- 1984 Mike Fitzgerald - C
- 1984 Dwight Gooden - RHP
- 1985 Roger McDowell - RHP
- 1989 Gregg Jefferies - 2B
- 1992 Todd Hundley - C
- 1992 Jeff Kent - 2B
- 2000 Jay Payton - OF
- 2001 Tsuyoshi Shinjo - OF
- 2003 Ty Wigginton - 3B
- 2009 Omir Santos C
- 2014 Travis d'Arnaud - C
- 2015 Michael Conforto - OF
- 2015 Noah Syndergaard - RHP
- 2019 Pete Alonso - 1B

=== Players Choice Awards Comeback Player ===
- Matt Harvey (2015)

=== The Sporting News Comeback Player of the Year Award ===
- Tommie Agee, 1969
- Ray Knight, 1986
- Rickey Henderson, 1999
- Fernando Tatís, 2008
- Matt Harvey, 2015

=== Sporting News Pitcher of the Year Award ===
- Tom Seaver, 1969, 1975
- Dwight Gooden, 1985
- R. A. Dickey, 2012
- Jacob deGrom, 2018, 2019, 2020

=== Baseball America Major League Executive of the Year ===
- Sandy Alderson, 2015

== Other achievements ==
=== Hall of Famers ===
See: New York Mets#Baseball Hall of Famers

=== Retired numbers ===
See: New York Mets#Retired numbers

=== Ford C. Frick Award (broadcasters) ===
See: New York Mets#Ford C. Frick Award recipients

=== New York BBWAA chapter awards ===
See: New York BBWAA chapter awards

==== Sid Mercer–Dick Young Player of the Year Award ====
- 1969: Tom Seaver
- 2015: Curtis Granderson
- 2018: Jacob DeGrom

==== Joan Payson Award ====
Note: The award is for excellence in community service.

==== Casey Stengel "You Can Look It Up" Award ====
Note: The award is to honor career achievement for those who went home empty-handed at previous dinners.

==== Joe DiMaggio "Toast of the Town" Award ====
The awards is for a player who has become a New York favorite.

==== William J. Slocum–Jack Lang Award ====
Note: The award is for long and meritorious service.

- 1967: Yogi Berra
- 1974: Willie Mays
- 1989: Tom Seaver

==== Ben Epstein–Dan Castellano "Good Guy" Award ====
Note: The award is for candor and accessibility to writers.

==== Willie, Mickey and the Duke Award ====
Note: The award is given to a group of players forever linked in baseball history.

- 1997: Cleon Jones, Tommie Agee, Ron Swoboda

=== World Baseball Classic All–WBC Team ===
- 2013 – David Wright (3B) (2013 World Baseball Classic § All-WBC team)

=== Associated Press Athlete of the Year ===
- Tom Seaver, 1969
- Dwight Gooden, 1985

=== Sporting News Sportsman of the Year ===
See: Sporting News#Sportsman of the Year

=== Sports Illustrated Sportsman of the Year Award ===
- Tom Seaver, 1969

=== Hickok Belt ===
See footnote

- Tom Seaver, 1969

=== New Jersey Sports Writers Association ===
See: New Jersey Sports Writers Association

- Man of the Year (1986) – Frank Cashen
- Sports Humanitarian of the Year (2001) – Bobby Valentine
- Sports Humanitarian of the Year (2008) – David Wright

== Minor league system ==
=== Baseball America Minor League Player of the Year ===
- 1983 – Dwight Gooden
- 1986 – Gregg Jefferies
- 1987 – Gregg Jefferies

=== Sterling Award (team MVPs) ===
- Each year, nine awards are given to the MVP on each of the nine minor league affiliates

== See also ==
- Baseball awards
- List of MLB awards
