= Michael Conforto =

American baseball player (born 1993)

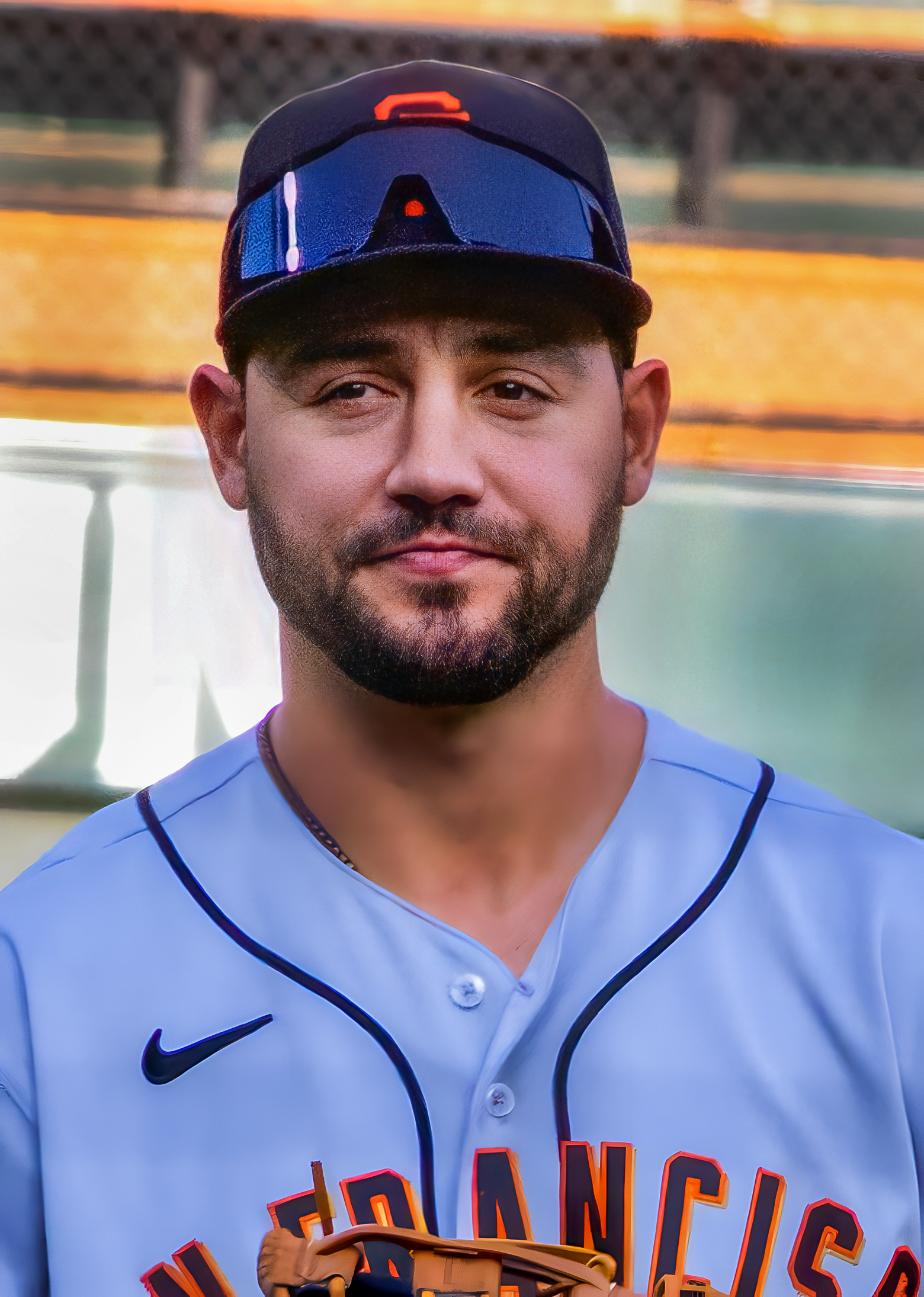
- Conforto with the San Francisco Giants in 2023

Free agent
- Outfielder
- Born: March 1, 1993 (age 33); Seattle, Washington, U.S.
- Bats: Left Throws: Right

MLB debut
- July 24, 2015, for the New York Mets

MLB statistics (through 2026 season)
- Batting average: .245
- Home runs: 194
- Runs batted in: 601
- Stats at Baseball Reference

Teams
- New York Mets (2015–2021); San Francisco Giants (2023–2024); Los Angeles Dodgers (2025); Chicago Cubs (2026)

Career highlights and awards
- All-Star (2017)
Medals
Men's baseball
Representing the United States
Haarlem Baseball Week
Bronze medal – third place	2012	Team

Michael Thomas Conforto (born March 1, 1993), nicknamed "Scooter", is an American professional baseball outfielder who is a free agent. He has played in Major League Baseball (MLB) for the New York Mets, San Francisco Giants, Los Angeles Dodgers, and Chicago Cubs.

After Conforto played college baseball for the Oregon State Beavers, the Mets selected him in the first round of the 2014 MLB draft with the 10th overall pick. He made his MLB debut in 2015. He was an All-Star in 2017 and an All-MLB Second Team outfielder in 2020. He became a free agent after the 2021 season, but missed the 2022 season due to a shoulder injury. He signed free agent contracts with the Giants before the 2023 season, the Dodgers before the 2025 season, and the Cubs ahead of the 2026 season.

== Early life ==
Conforto represented the Northwest Region in the Little League World Series in 2004. He attended Redmond High School in Redmond, Washington, where he was an honor roll student. He played shortstop on the baseball team, and quarterback and safety on the football team. In football, he was named second-team All-State. He was recruited by Ivy League schools for football. In baseball, he batted .310 as a sophomore, .361 as a junior (when he was All-State), and .400 as a senior (when he was named All-State and All-League). He received offers to play baseball at Oregon, Arizona, Arizona State, Washington, Washington State, Stanford, and Oregon State.

== College career ==
As a freshman at Oregon State University in 2012, Conforto hit .349/.437/.601 with 13 home runs (tied for 1st), 12 hit-by-pitch (7th), and led the Pac-12 with 76 runs batted in (RBIs) in 218 at bats over 58 games. His 76 RBIs were an Oregon State single-season record. He was named Freshman Hitter of the Year by the National Collegiate Baseball Writers Association and was the Pac-12 Freshman of the Year. During the summer he played for the USA Baseball collegiate national team. As a sophomore in 2013, Conforto hit .328/.447 (2nd)/.526 (8th) with 48 runs (7th), 14 doubles (8th), 11 home runs (tied for 1st), 47 RBIs (7th), 41 walks (1st), and 14 hit-by-pitch (5th) in 247 at bats over 65 games. He helped lead the team to the College World Series, where he went 7-for-16 and was named to the All-Tournament Team. He was named the Pac-12 Player of the Year and was named a first-team All-American by the American Baseball Coaches Association. He again played for the collegiate national team during the summer in 2013.

Prior to the 2014 season, he was named the preseason Sporting News College Baseball Player of the Year. Conforto finished the season hitting .345 (4th)/.504 (1st).547 (2nd) with 52 runs (1st), 16 doubles (3rd), seven home runs (3rd), 56 RBIs (2nd), and 55 walks (1st), and 12 hit-by-pitch (9th) in 203 at bats over 59 games. He again was named the Pac-12 Baseball Player of the Year. He was also a finalist for the Golden Spikes Award and the Dick Howser Trophy.

== Professional career ==
=== Draft and minor leagues ===
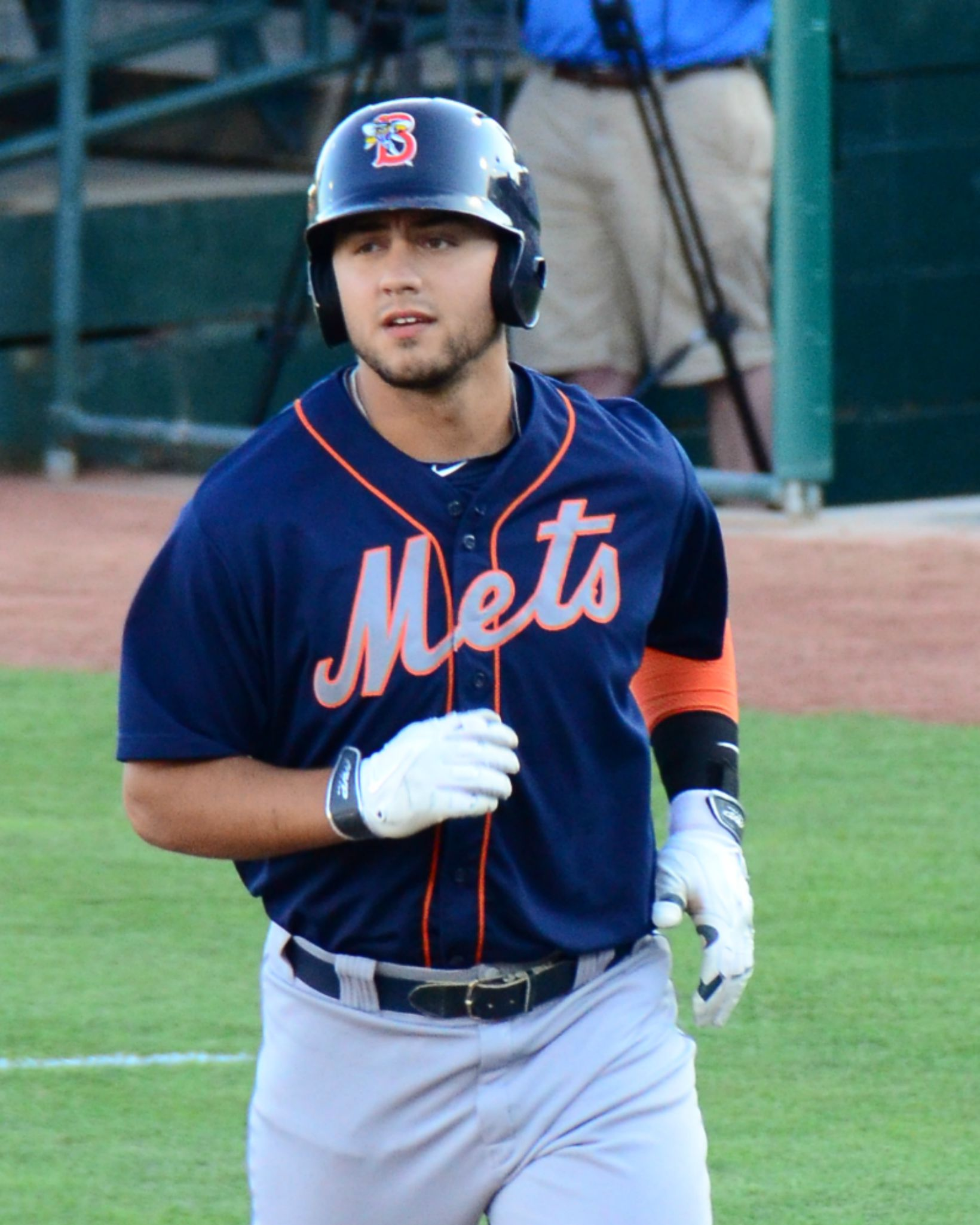
Conforto with the Binghamton Mets in 2015

The New York Mets selected Conforto in the first round, with the 10th overall selection of the 2014 Major League Baseball draft. Conforto signed with the Mets on July 11, 2014, receiving a $2,970,800 signing bonus. He played for the Brooklyn Cyclones of the Class A-Short Season New York–Penn League after he signed. He batted .331 (5th in the league)/.403 (5th)/.448 with 3 home runs, 19 RBIs, and 5 hit-by-pitch (8th) in 163 at bats, and was named a Baseball America Short-Season All Star.

Conforto started the 2015 season with the St. Lucie Mets of the Class A-Advanced Florida State League, for whom he batted .283/.350/.462 (4th in the league) with 7 home runs and 28 RBIs in 206 at bats, and led the league with six intentional walks. He was promoted to the Binghamton Mets of the Class AA Eastern League on June 26, 2015, for whom he batted .312/.396 (8th in the league)/.503 with 5 home runs and 26 RBIs in 197 at bats. On July 12, 2015, at Great American Ball Park in Cincinnati, he started in left field for the United States team at the All-Star Futures Game and collected two hits and one assist. He was named an FSL Mid-Season All Star, and to the 2015 Topps Rookie All-Star team.

In 2016 with Triple-A Las Vegas in the Pacific Coast League, Conforto batted .422 (leading the league)/.483 (first)/.727 (2nd) with 30 runs, 9 home runs, and 28 RBIs with a 1.209 OPS in 128 at bats.

=== New York Mets (2015–2021) ===
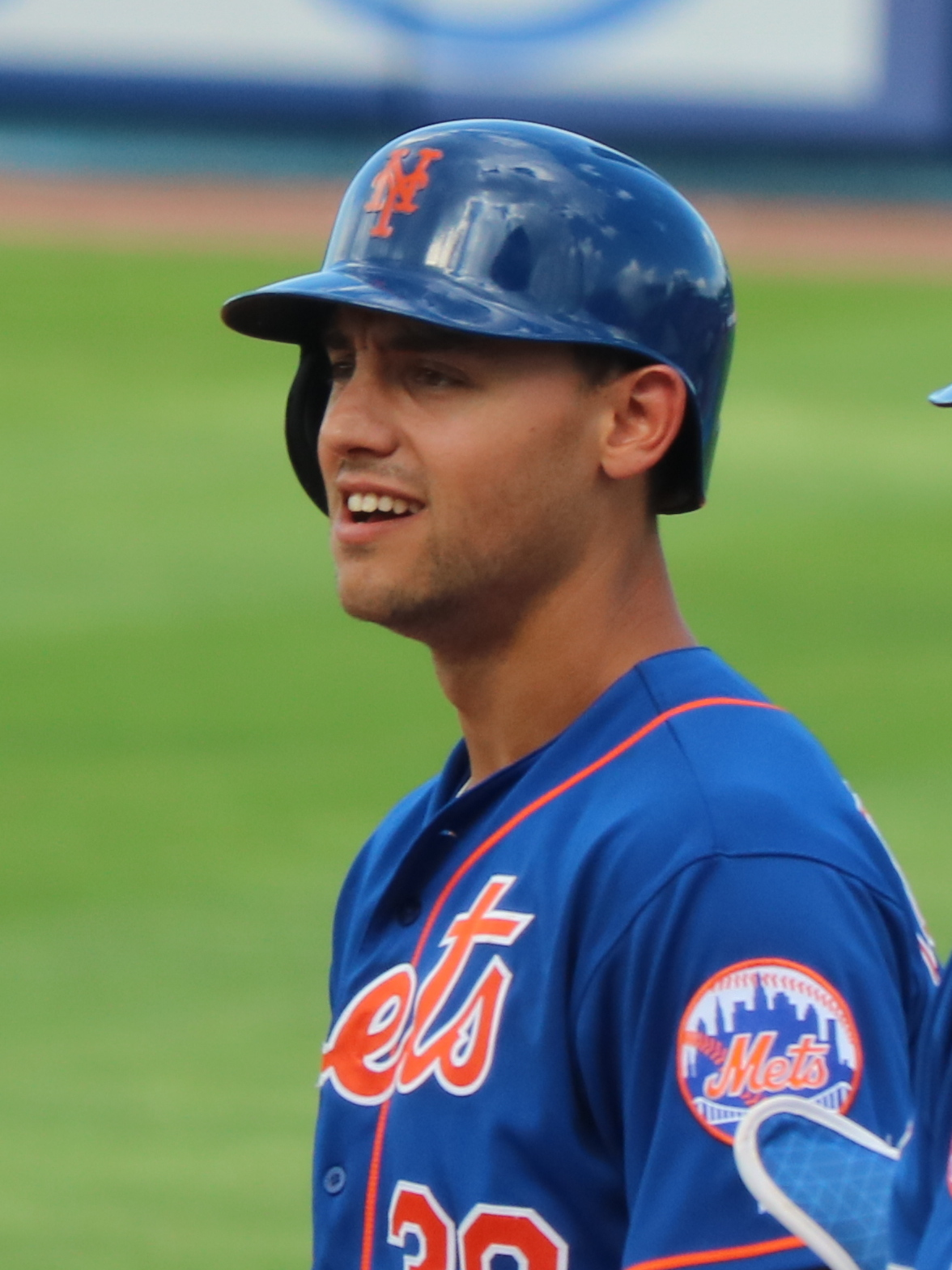
Conforto with the New York Mets in 2019

On July 24, 2015, the Mets promoted Conforto to the major leagues. He made his debut later that day, picking up his first major league RBI on a groundout, but going 0-for-3 while becoming the 1,000th player to appear in a game for the Mets. The next day, he collected his first major league hit, an RBI, as part of a four-hit game. He hit his first major-league home run on August 3 off Miami Marlins' starter Tom Koehler. He finished the season batting .270/.335/.506 with 30 runs, 9 home runs, and 26 RBIs in 174 at bats over 56 games played, and was in the top 3% in the major leagues with a maximum exit velocity of 115 mph. On defense, he exclusively played left field. The Mets won the 2015 National League pennant, making Conforto the third player in history to have played in the Little League World Series, College World Series, and Major League World Series, along with pitcher Ed Vosberg and catcher Jason Varitek. Conforto hit two home runs in Game 4 of the 2015 World Series, becoming the first rookie to homer twice in a world series game since Andruw Jones accomplished the feat in Game 1 of the 1996 World Series.

Entering 2016, Conforto became the Mets everyday left fielder. After a torrid start in April, Conforto began to slump once May came. From May 1 to June 25, 2016, Conforto's batting average dipped to .130. On June 25, the Mets demoted Conforto to the Las Vegas 51s of the Class AAA Pacific Coast League and called up Brandon Nimmo. Conforto was recalled to the majors on July 18. After his return to the Mets, Conforto began playing both corner outfield positions. He made his major league debut in center field on July 23, 2016, as a defensive replacement. For the season, he batted .220/.310/.414 with 12 home runs and 42 RBIs in 304 at bats for the Mets, and was again in the top 3% in the major leagues with a maximum exit velocity of 115.0 mph.

Conforto started the 2017 season as the Mets fourth outfielder but worked his way to a starting job. He was selected to the MLB All-Star Game in Miami after hitting .285/.405/.548 through the first half. On August 24, during a game against the Arizona Diamondbacks, Conforto suffered a season-ending injury during a swing, as he dislocated his left shoulder and tore his posterior capsule. He elected to have surgery on September 2. For the 2017 season, Conforto batted .279/.384/.555 with 27 home runs and 68 RBIs in 373 at bats.

In 2018, Conforto hit .243/.350/.448 and led the Mets with 28 home runs, 82 RBIs, and 78 runs scored, as his 84 walks were 8th in the NL and his 159 strikeouts were 7th in the league, in 543 at bats. He had the 11th-longest home run in baseball for the season, at 472 feet.

Sample of Conforto's home run swing in 2019. Click to expand.

On May 28, 2019, Conforto hit his first career grand slam against the Los Angeles Dodgers at Dodger Stadium. He finished the season batting .257/.363/.494 with a .856 OPS, career highs in home runs (33) and RBIs (92), as he had 84 walks (9th in the NL), in 549 at bats.

In 2020 for the Mets, Conforto played in 54 games, batting .322 (7th in the NL)/.412 (6th)/.515 with 40 runs, 9 home runs, 31 RBIs, and 7 hit by pitch (6th) in 202 at bats. He was in the top 5% in the major leagues with a maximum exit velocity of 114.4 mph. He led NL outfielders in assists, with six, playing right field exclusively.

Prior to the 2021 season, the Mets offered Conforto a $100 million contract extension, which he declined.

On April 8, 2021, Conforto was the batter during a rare walk-off hit by pitch to win a game against the Miami Marlins. The HBP call was controversial, with umpire Ron Kulpa saying after watching a post-game replay that he felt his call was in error, and that Conforto instead should have been charged with a strike. On September 30, Conforto was entering a game against the Marlins in what could have been his final game as a Met at Citi Field. Conforto went 3-for-5 with two RBIs and a double. He made his mark defensively as well: In the top of the ninth inning, up 12-3, Conforto recorded the second out of the inning with an impressive diving catch. Following the play, he received a standing ovation from the fans, despite a disappointing 2021 season. Conforto appeared to be in tears, and later described his emotions during the game as "something I've never really felt before". He also acknowledged first base coach Tony Tarasco, who held Conforto's hand up in the air before Conforto entered the dugout. Conforto finished the 2021 season batting .232/.344/.384 with 14 home runs and 55 RBIs in 406 at bats, with a career-worst slugging percentage, as well as a batting average and OPS worse than any season of his aside from 2016, which was the first year he began the season in the majors. On defense, he exclusively played right field.

=== Free agency (2022) ===
Following the 2021 season, the Mets offered him a qualifying offer (one-year for $18.4 million), which Conforto also declined, instead choosing free agency. The 2021–22 Major League Baseball lockout delayed free agency talks that offseason. Conforto started the 2022 season as a free agent. His agent, Scott Boras, later released a statement saying that an offseason shoulder injury suffered in January 2022 during a workout resulted in Conforto not starting the season with a contract. In April, Boras said that Conforto underwent right shoulder surgery and would not play at all in 2022. Because he didn't sign with a team before the 2022 MLB draft, the Mets did not receive a compensation draft pick for Conforto rejecting their qualifying offer.

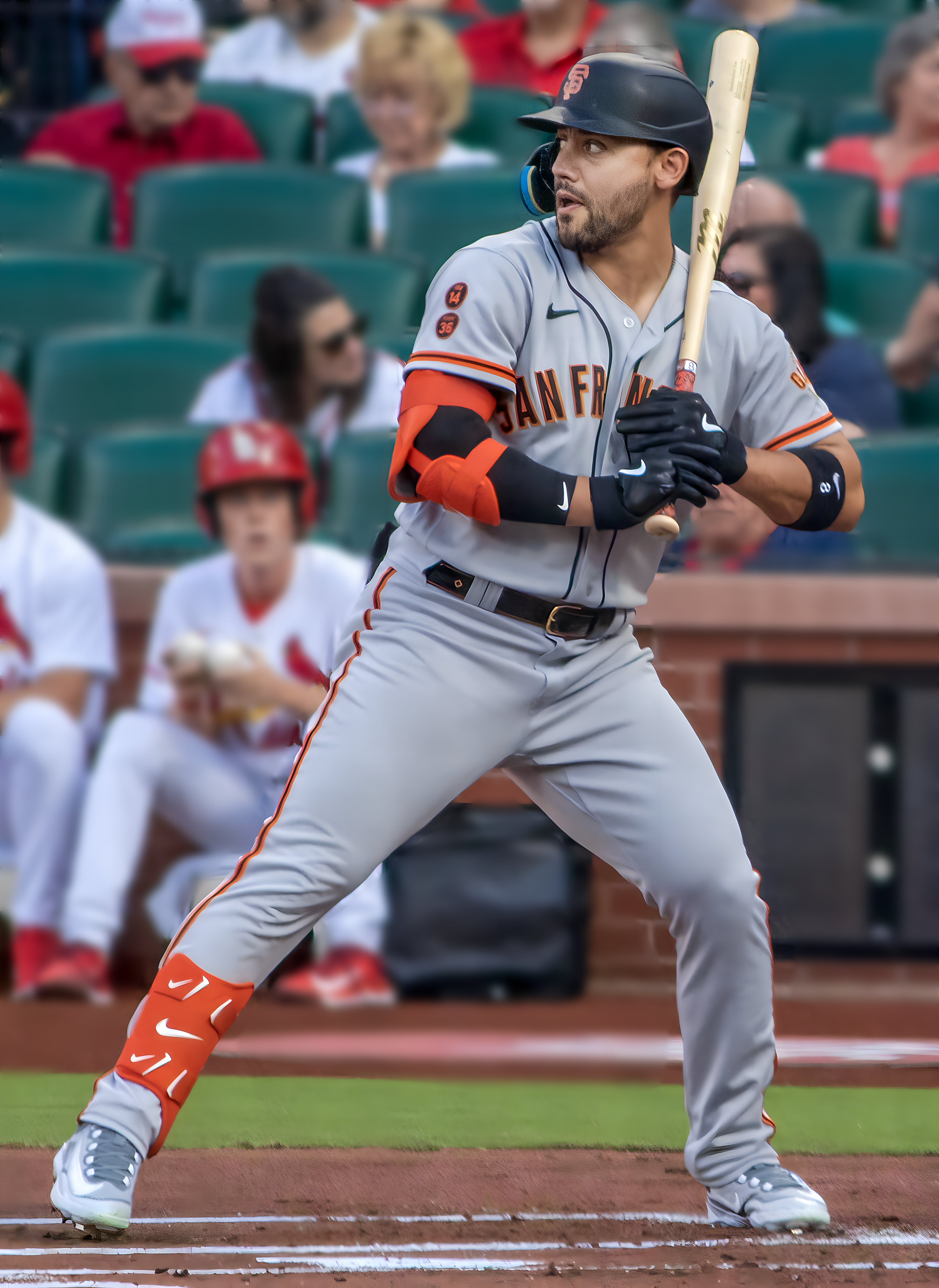
Conforto with the Giants in 2023

=== San Francisco Giants (2023–2024) ===
On January 6, 2023, Conforto signed a two-year, $36 million contract with the San Francisco Giants, containing an opt-out clause after the first season. After the 2023 season, Conforto opted in for the 2024 season at $18 million. In his two seasons with the Giants, Conforto had 35 home runs, a .238 batting average, .740 OPS, and 108 OPS+ in 255 games played.

=== Los Angeles Dodgers (2025) ===
On December 10, 2024, Conforto signed a one-year, $17 million contract with the Los Angeles Dodgers. Conforto became the Dodgers starting left fielder but hit poorly all season, causing the fan base to publicly call for his release. Despite his struggles, he continued to get playing time in a platoon with Alex Call. He played in 138 games for the Dodgers with a slash line of .199/.305/.333, the lowest marks of his career. Conforto was left off the Dodgers' postseason roster, as the team won the World Series over the Toronto Blue Jays.

=== Chicago Cubs ===
On February 23, 2026, Conforto signed a minor league contract with the Chicago Cubs that included an invitation to spring training. On March 23, the Cubs announced that Conforto had made the team's Opening Day roster. On March 25, Conforto's contract was officially selected by the Cubs.

On May 3, 2026, Conforto hit his first career walk-off home run as a pinch hitter in the Cubs' 5-4 win over the Cincinnati Reds.

== Personal life ==
Conforto's mother, Tracie Conforto (née Ruiz), is a three-time Olympic medalist in synchronized swimming, and his father, Mike played inside linebacker at Penn State. His sister, Jacqueline, played soccer at Azusa Pacific University.

Conforto got engaged to Cabernet Burns in January 2021. The couple married in December the same year. Their first child was born in December 2023.

Conforto resides in Scottsdale, Arizona, during the offseason.

== See also ==
- 2013 College Baseball All-America Team
- New York Mets award winners and league leaders
- Oregon State Beavers baseball statistical leaders
