= Jeurys Familia =

Dominican baseball player (born 1989)

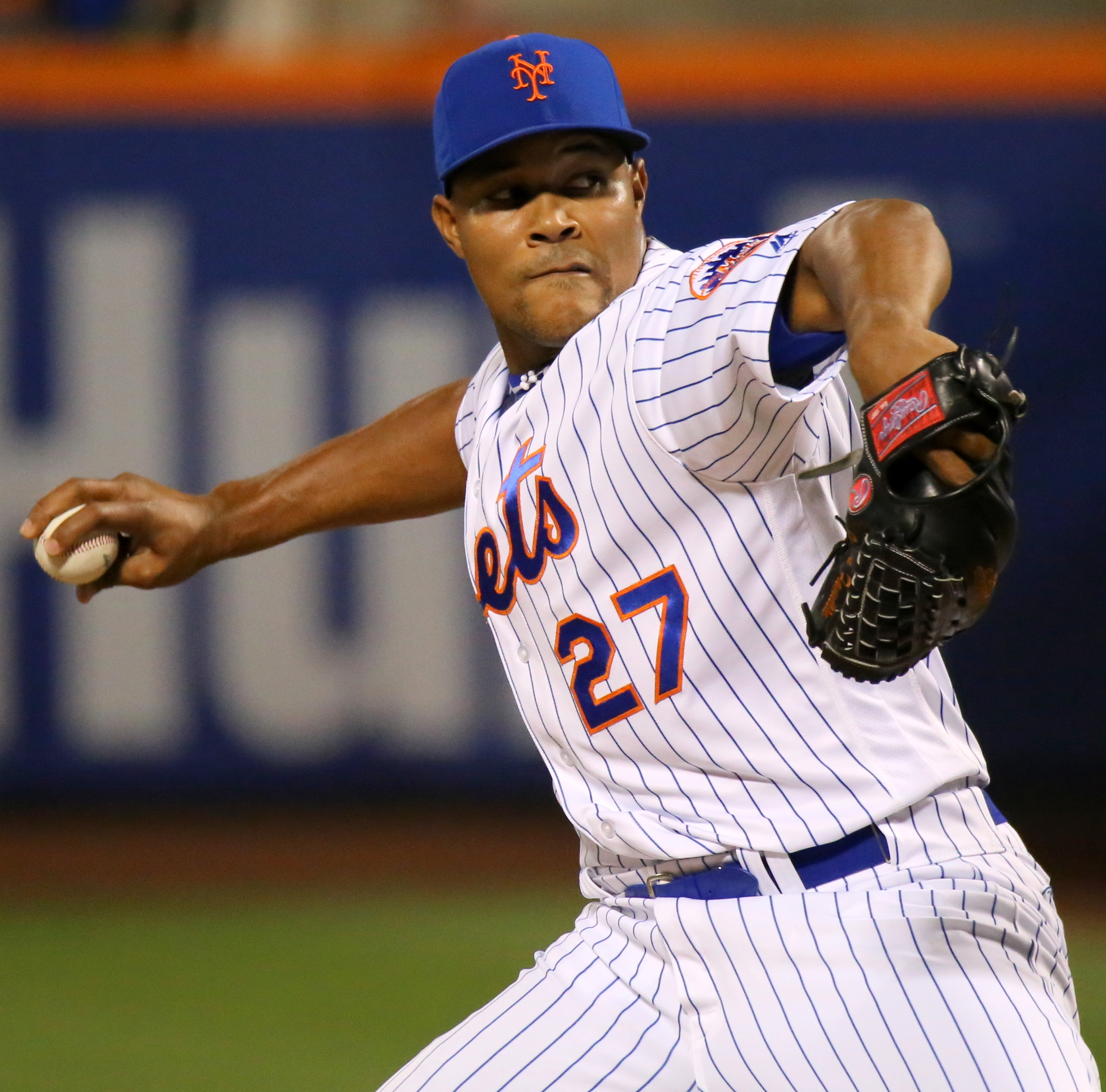
- Familia with the New York Mets in 2016
- Pitcher
- Born: October 10, 1989 (age 37); Santo Domingo, Dominican Republic
- Batted: Right Threw: Right

MLB debut
- September 4, 2012, for the New York Mets

Last MLB appearance
- May 2, 2023, for the Oakland Athletics

MLB statistics
- Win–loss record: 34–29
- Earned run average: 3.58
- Strikeouts: 577
- Saves: 127
- Stats at Baseball Reference

Teams
- New York Mets (2012–2018); Oakland Athletics (2018); New York Mets (2019–2021); Philadelphia Phillies (2022); Boston Red Sox (2022); Oakland Athletics (2023)

Career highlights and awards
- All-Star (2016); MLB saves leader (2016)

Jeurys Familia Mojica (Spanish pronunciation: [ˈxewɾis faˈmilja]; born October 10, 1989) is a Dominican former professional baseball pitcher. He played in Major League Baseball (MLB) for the New York Mets, Oakland Athletics, Philadelphia Phillies, and Boston Red Sox.

Familia signed with the Mets as a non-drafted free agent in 2007. He made his MLB debut in 2012, and became the team's closer in 2015. He was named an MLB All-Star in 2016. The Mets traded him to the Athletics in July 2018, then re-signed him in late 2018 to a three-year deal that spanned the 2019–2021 seasons. He then spent parts of the 2022 season with the Phillies and Red Sox.

== Early life ==
Familia's father worked for the Dominican military and part-time at a gas station despite being hindered by a leg injury suffered in a childhood accident. Familia's mother worked in a small boutique. On their combined wages, the parents raised five children.

Growing up in the Boca Chica section of Santo Domingo, Familia's favorite sport to play was basketball. He was especially fond of Allen Iverson and was also a fan of Kobe Bryant. He did not begin playing baseball until he was older and his friends had largely abandoned basketball in its favor. He did not have access to baseball equipment for most of his childhood.

== Professional career ==
Familia is 6 feet 4 inches (1.93 m) and 230 pounds (100 kg); he both bats and throws right. Familia was signed by the New York Mets as an amateur free agent on July 13, 2007 for $100,000.

=== Minor leagues ===
==== 2008–10 ====
Familia pitched for the Gulf Coast League Mets in 2008, compiling a 2–2 record with a 2.79 ERA in 51.2 innings pitched. In 2009, he pitched for the Single-A Savannah Sand Gnats, going 10–6 with a 2.69 ERA in 134 innings pitched. In 2010, Familia was promoted to the St. Lucie Mets of the Florida State League. He went 6–9 with a 5.58 ERA through 121 innings and struck out 10.2 batters per nine innings in a full season with St. Lucie. Also in 2010, Familia was selected to represent the Mets at the All-Star Futures Game where he pitched for the World Team.

==== 2011–12 ====
Due to his sub-par performance in 2010, Familia began the 2011 season with the Single-A St. Lucie Mets. After six starts he went 1–1 with a 1.49 ERA in 36.1 innings. Familia was then promoted to the Double-A Binghamton Mets of the Eastern League. After his promotion to Binghamton, Familia went 4–4 with a 3.49 ERA in 87.2 innings. He finished the 2011 season across 2 minor league levels at 5–5 with a 2.90 ERA. Familia's performance made him an EAS Mid-Season All-Star. On November 18, 2011, Familia was added to the Mets 40 man roster.

After getting back on track in 2011, Familia was promoted to the Mets Triple-A affiliate, the Buffalo Bisons of the International League, in 2012. Prior to starting his minor league season, Familia was invited to the Mets' spring training camp. Familia was also ranked at 84th on MLB.com's best 100 prospects list and 3rd in the Mets organization prior to the start of the 2012 campaign. Through 28 starts with Buffalo, Familia went 9–9 with a 4.73 ERA. On September 4, Familia was called up the New York Mets due to expanded September rosters.

=== New York Mets ===
==== 2012–2014 ====
On September 4, 2012, Familia made his MLB debut against the St. Louis Cardinals at Busch Stadium. He pitched a scoreless eighth inning, striking out the first batter he faced, Lance Berkman. Although Familia had mostly started in the minors, he was used out of the bullpen as a reliever in his inaugural season. Familia made one start in 2012 on October 1 against the Miami Marlins at Marlins Park by pitching four scoreless innings, walking six batters, striking out three and giving up just one hit. The Mets wound up losing 2–3. Familia finished the season with an ERA of 5.84 appearing in 8 games (one start) in 12.1 innings pitched with 10 strikeouts and a WHIP of 1.541 while giving up 10 hits, 8 runs and 9 walks.

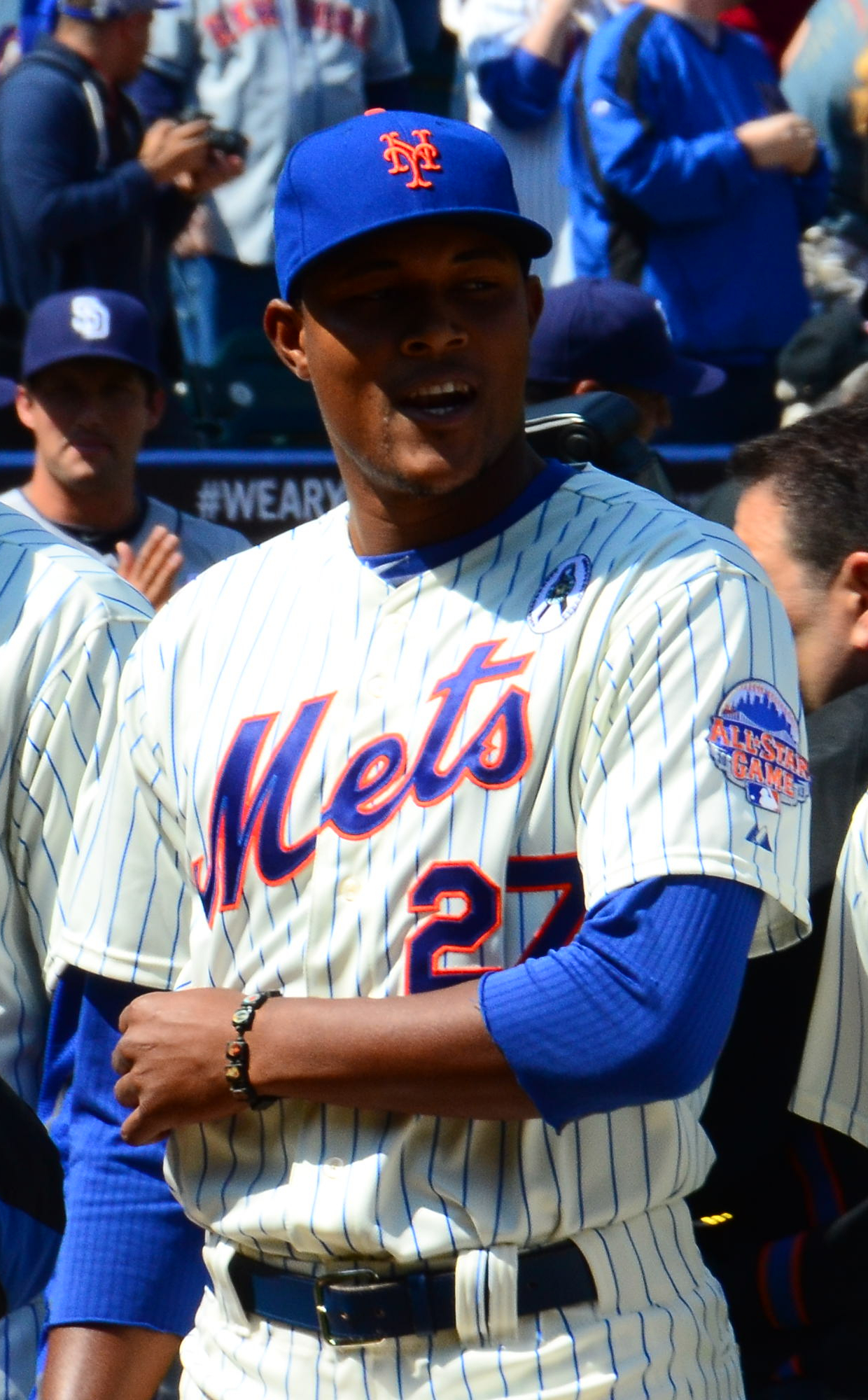
Familia with the New York Mets in 2013

Familia made the Mets' roster for Opening Day in 2013. He made one appearance before being optioned to Triple-A Las Vegas for Aaron Laffey on April 7. After 4 appearances there, he was recalled on April 17, replacing Greg Burke. After 7 appearances with the Mets, he was placed on the disabled list on May 12 with tendinitis in his right elbow. After starting a rehab assignment in St. Lucie, his elbow got worse, and he underwent surgery on June 5. Familia was moved to the 60-day disabled list to make room for David Aardsma on the 40-man roster. After making one rehab start in St. Lucie and one in Brooklyn, he was activated by the Mets on September 14. He made one appearance before the end of the season. In 9 games with New York in 2013, he finished 3 games with a 4.22 ERA with 8 strikeouts and a WHIP of 1.969 in 10.2 innings pitched while giving up 12 hits, 5 runs, 2 home runs, and 9 walks. He also recorded one save.

On July 30, 2014, against the Philadelphia Phillies at Citi Field, Familia came into the game in the seventh inning and got the final out while facing one batter. In the bottom half with runners on first and second, two out, Mets leading 8–2 and one a one ball count, Familia lined a hit into left field scoring in Chris Young for his first RBI and his second hit of his career and of that season. The hit came off of pitcher Justin De Fratus. He went 2 for 3 with an average of .667 in 2014. Familia pitched the eight inning getting three outs with one strikeout facing three batters. Familia finished the season with a 2–5 record, 2.21 ERA in 76 games with 73 strikeouts, five saves with a WHIP of 1.177 in 77.1 innings pitched. He wound up giving up 59 hits, 26 runs (19 of them earned), 3 home runs, and 32 walks.

==== 2015 ====
Familia became the established eighth inning pitcher, or the "set-up man" in front of the closer, Jenrry Mejia, in 2014. When Mejia was suspended early in the 2015 season, Familia became the Mets' closer. Familia made it to the final vote of the 2015 Major League Baseball All-Star Game but lost to Carlos Martinez. Familia struggled after the All-Star break, blowing three consecutive saves in late July, including giving up a game-winning home run to Justin Upton on July 30, 2015, when the Mets blew a six-run lead. In the following weeks, however, he dramatically turned things around with 16 consecutive scoreless innings, zero earned runs, and eight converted saves in eight opportunities.

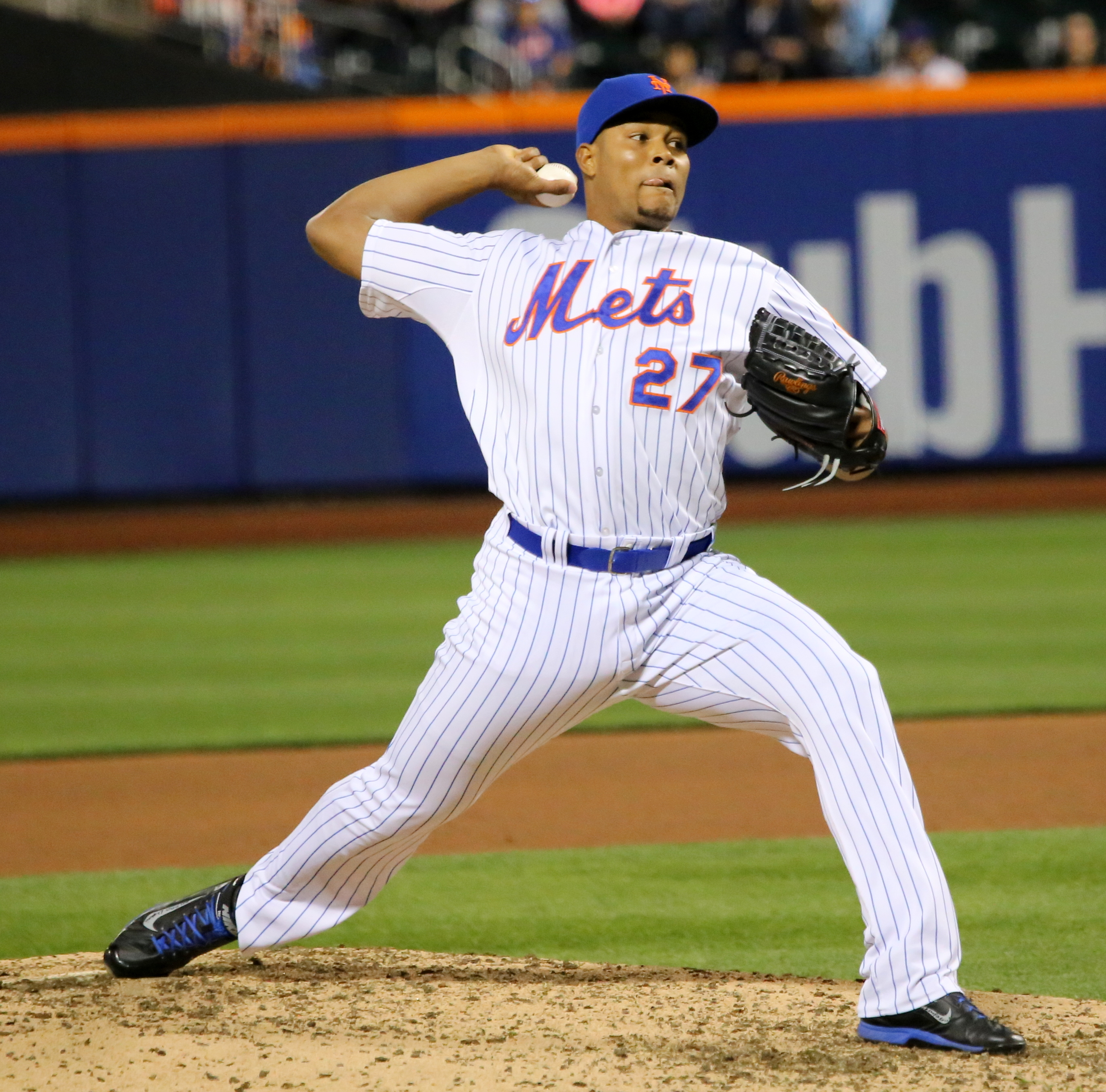
Familia with the New York Mets in 2015

On October 4, Familia recorded his forty-third save in a 1–0 win against the Washington Nationals at Citi Field. He gave up a double to Bryce Harper with two outs and got Jayson Werth to fly out to center fielder Juan Lagares to end the game. The game was the final game of the 2015 regular season and snapped the Mets' five game losing streak. The save tied the club record set by Armando Benítez in 2001. He finished the season with a 2–2 record, 1.85 ERA in 76 games with a career high 43 saves, 86 strikeouts in 78 innings pitched with a WHIP of 1.000 while giving up 59 hits, 16 runs, 6 home runs, and 19 walks.

Familia recorded two saves in the 2015 National League Division Series against the Los Angeles Dodgers, retiring all 16 batters he faced. In the 2015 National League Championship Series against the Cubs, Familia recorded three saves over 4 1/3 innings pitched, giving up 2 hits and 2 walks and no runs. Familia struck out Dexter Fowler to send the Mets to the World Series. In game 1 of the 2015 World Series against the Kansas City Royals, he gave up a game-tying home run to Alex Gordon in the ninth inning; the Mets would eventually lose, 5–4, in 14 innings. He gave up the home run to Gordon on a quick pitch, which Familia used to throw off hitters' timing throughout the 2015 season. Familia blew saves in games 4 and 5 as well, both of which the Mets lost, the latter of which ended the series. Familia's three blown saves in the series established a new World Series record. He tied Robb Nen for most save opportunities in one postseason, with eight (which was later tied in 2023 by Paul Sewald).

==== 2016 ====
On May 25, Familia set a franchise record by converting 32 consecutive save opportunities, breaking a tie with Billy Wagner. On June 24, Familia broke another franchise record previously held by Armando Benítez by converting 25 consecutive save opportunities to open the season. On July 5, Familia was named to the National League roster for the 2016 Major League Baseball All-Star Game at Petco Park, joining teammates Yoenis Céspedes, Bartolo Colón, Noah Syndergaard and Mets manager Terry Collins.

On July 27, Familia blew his first save opportunity of his last 53 after allowing two runs on two hits and two walks to the St. Louis Cardinals, ending the third longest consecutive save streak in MLB history. On August 31, Familia recorded his 44th save of the season, breaking the Mets club record previously held by Armando Benítez and tied by Familia in 2015. Familia finished the season with 51 saves, the most in Major League Baseball. He became the only Mets pitcher other than John Franco to lead the National League in saves.

Despite his impressive save record for the year, Familia gave up the winning three-run home run to Conor Gillaspie in the top of the ninth in the 2016 National League Wild Card Game against the San Francisco Giants as the Mets lost 3–0.

Familia placed in a tie with catcher, and future teammate, Wilson Ramos for seventeenth in voting for the 2016 National League Most Valuable Player Award.

==== 2017 ====
On March 29, 2017, Familia was suspended for the first 15 games of the season without pay for violating the league's personal conduct policy, regarding a domestic violence incident that occurred nearly five months prior to the suspension. Familia was activated on April 20 and made his season debut that night at Citi Field. On May 11, Familia was diagnosed with an arterial clot in his right shoulder. The next day, on May 12, Familia underwent surgery to remove the blockage from his posterior circumflex humeral artery. Familia was activated from the disabled list on August 25. Familia ended the season going 6-for-7 in save opportunities in 26 relief appearances.

==== 2018 ====
Familia began the season as the Mets closer. In 40 games, he was 4–4 while going 17-for-21 in save opportunities.

=== Oakland Athletics ===
On July 21, 2018, Familia was traded to the Athletics in exchange for Will Toffey and Bobby Wahl. Familia served as the A's setup man to closer Blake Treinen. In 30 games for the A's, Familia went 4–2 with 40 strikeouts in 31 1/3 innings.

=== New York Mets (second stint) ===
On December 14, 2018, the Mets re-signed Familia to a three-year deal. In 2019, Familia pitched in 66 games, registering a 5.70 ERA and a 4–2 record with 63 strikeouts in 60 innings pitched. During the shortened 2020 season, he lowered his ERA to 3.71 while recording 23 strikeouts in 26 2/3 innings of work. In 2021, Familia posted a career-high nine wins and pitched to a 3.94 ERA with 72 strikeouts in 59 1/3 innings.

=== Philadelphia Phillies ===
On March 15, 2022, Familia signed a one-year contract with the Philadelphia Phillies. On August 2, Familia was designated for assignment after posting a 6.09 ERA with 33 strikeouts in 34 innings pitched. He cleared waivers and was released on August 6.

=== Boston Red Sox ===
On August 9, 2022, Familia signed a minor league contract with the Boston Red Sox. He was added to Boston's major-league roster on August 13. In 10 relief appearances, he posted a 1–2 record with a 6.10 ERA while striking out eight batters in 10 1/3 innings. The Red Sox designated Familia for assignment on September 14. He elected free agency on September 16 rather than accepting a minor-league assignment.

=== Arizona Diamondbacks ===
On January 25, 2023, Familia signed a minor league contract with the Arizona Diamondbacks organization. Familia allowed one earned run in 6.0 innings pitched in spring training before he was released by the Diamondbacks on March 24.

=== Oakland Athletics (second stint) ===
On March 25, 2023, Familia signed a one-year contract with the Oakland Athletics. He made 14 appearances for Oakland, registering a 6.39 ERA with 9 strikeouts and 2 saves in 12.2 innings of work. On May 4, Familia was designated for assignment by the Athletics. He was released by the team on May 6.

=== Diablos Rojos del México ===
On April 21, 2024, Familia signed with the Diablos Rojos del México of the Mexican League. In nine relief appearances, Familia posted a 2.00 ERA and six strikeouts in nine innings pitched. On July 5, Familia was released by the Diablos.

Following the 2024 season, Familia signed with the Leones del Escogido to play winter league baseball in the Dominican Professional Baseball League.

On February 7, 2025, it was announced that Familia was training for an MLB comeback. However, as of November 2025, he remains unsigned.

== Personal life ==
Familia's son, Jeurys Jr., was born to his fiancée, Bianca Rivas, on June 12, 2015, while the elder Familia saved a win against the Atlanta Braves. In the summer of 2015, Familia also completed construction on a new house for his parents back in the Dominican Republic. Construction on the house had begun in 2014, but was delayed when Familia decided to pay for surgery to repair a leg injury that had plagued his father since childhood.

On October 31, 2016, Familia was arrested on a domestic violence charge in Fort Lee, New Jersey. On December 15, the charge was dismissed due to lack of evidence. The October arrest was also expunged from his record. Familia was only suspended for fifteen games after he and his wife cooperated with an investigation by the league, which failed to find that he "physically assaulted his wife, or threatened her or others with physical force or harm, on October 31, 2016."

== Awards and accomplishments ==
=== Minor leagues ===
- All-Star Futures Game (2010)
- Eastern League Mid-Season All-Star (2011)

=== Major leagues ===
- MLB All-Star (2016)
- MLB saves leader (2016)
- New York Mets single-season saves record: 51 (2016)
