= Pete Alonso =

American baseball player (born 1994)

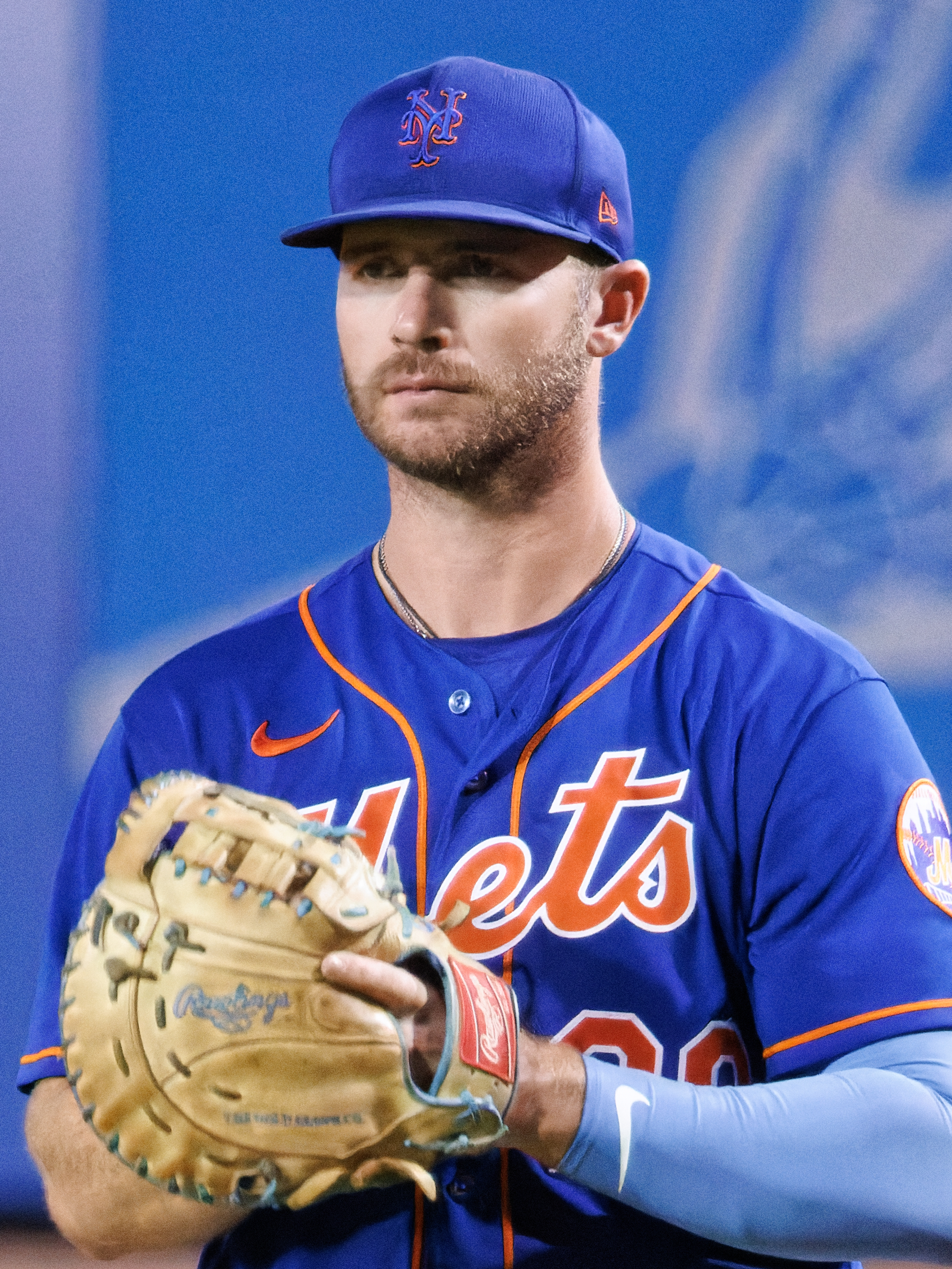
- Alonso with the New York Mets in 2023

Baltimore Orioles – No. 25
- First baseman
- Born: December 7, 1994 (age 31); Tampa, Florida, U.S.
- Bats: Right Throws: Right

MLB debut
- March 28, 2019, for the New York Mets

MLB statistics (through 2026 season)
- Batting average: .255
- Hits: 1,112
- Home runs: 307
- Runs batted in: 825
- Stats at Baseball Reference

Teams
- New York Mets (2019–2025); Baltimore Orioles (2026–present)

Career highlights and awards
- 5× All-Star (2019, 2022–2025); 2x All-MLB First Team (2019, 2026); NL Rookie of the Year (2019); 2× Silver Slugger Award (2025, 2026); 2× home run leader (2019, 2026); 2× RBI leader (2022, 2026); MLB records: Home runs by a rookie in a season: 53 (2019)
Medals
Men's baseball
Representing United States
World Baseball Classic
Silver medal – second place	2023 Miami	Team

Peter Morgan Alonso (born December 7, 1994), nicknamed "Polar Bear", is an American professional baseball first baseman for the Baltimore Orioles of Major League Baseball (MLB). He has previously played in MLB for the New York Mets. Internationally, Alonso represents the United States.

Alonso played college baseball for the Florida Gators before the Mets selected him in the 2016 MLB draft. He made his MLB debut on Opening Day in 2019 and won the National League Rookie of the Year Award that year, setting a major league record for rookies with 53 home runs. Alonso is a five-time MLB All-Star who led the league in home runs in 2019 (NL) and 2026 (AL) and in runs batted in in 2022 (NL) and 2026 (AL), becoming the only player in major league history to lead both the National and American League, and is the Mets' all-time franchise leader in home runs. He has also won the MLB Home Run Derby twice, in 2019 and 2021.

== Early life ==
Peter Morgan Alonso was born on December 7, 1994, in Tampa, Florida. Alonso attended Jesuit High School in Tampa for his first two years of high school, and transferred to Henry B. Plant High School in Tampa to finish high school. He played lacrosse and football as a freshman before deciding to focus solely on baseball. For the baseball team, he was a third baseman.

His grandfather, Peter Conrad Alonso, was a Spanish refugee who fled Barcelona during the Spanish Civil War to New York City through Ellis Island. He settled in Queens and became a Brooklyn Dodgers fan. He attended Jamaica High School but his education was cut short due to his military service in World War II from 1942 to 1945 but continued his education at New York University earning multiple degrees, where he met Anna (née Pirraglia, of Italian descent) whom he married in 1951. They then moved to Long Island, begetting three daughters and Peter Matthew, Pete Alonso's father, before resettling the family to Lancaster, Ohio in 1963. Later, his father met and married his mother, Michelle Lynn Alonso (née Morgan), an Ohio native who was a student-athlete at Ohio Wesleyan University having played college softball.

== College career ==
Alonso enrolled at the University of Florida, where he played college baseball for the Florida Gators as a first baseman. He was named All-Southeastern Conference in his freshman year. In 2014, he played collegiate summer baseball with the Madison Mallards of the Northwoods League. He earned league MVP honors after posting a .354 batting average across 59 games and leading the league in home runs. In 2024, he was inducted into the Mallards' Hall of Fame. In the summer of 2015, he played for the Bourne Braves of the Cape Cod Baseball League. In 2016, his junior year with the Gators, he hit .374/.469/.659 with 14 home runs and 60 RBIs in 58 games. He competed for Florida in the 2015 and 2016 College World Series.

== Professional career ==
=== Draft and minor leagues ===
The New York Mets selected Alonso in the second round of the 2016 Major League Baseball draft with the 64th overall pick. He signed with the Mets for a $909,200 signing bonus, and made his professional debut in 2016 with the Brooklyn Cyclones of the Low–A New York–Penn League. He posted a .322 batting average with five home runs and 21 RBI in 30 games and was chosen to participate in the league's All-Star Game. He began the 2017 season with the St. Lucie Mets of the High-A Florida State League, and after batting .286 with 16 home runs and 58 RBI in 82 games, was promoted to the Binghamton Rumble Ponies of the Double–A Eastern League in August, where he batted .311 with two home runs and five RBI in 11 games.

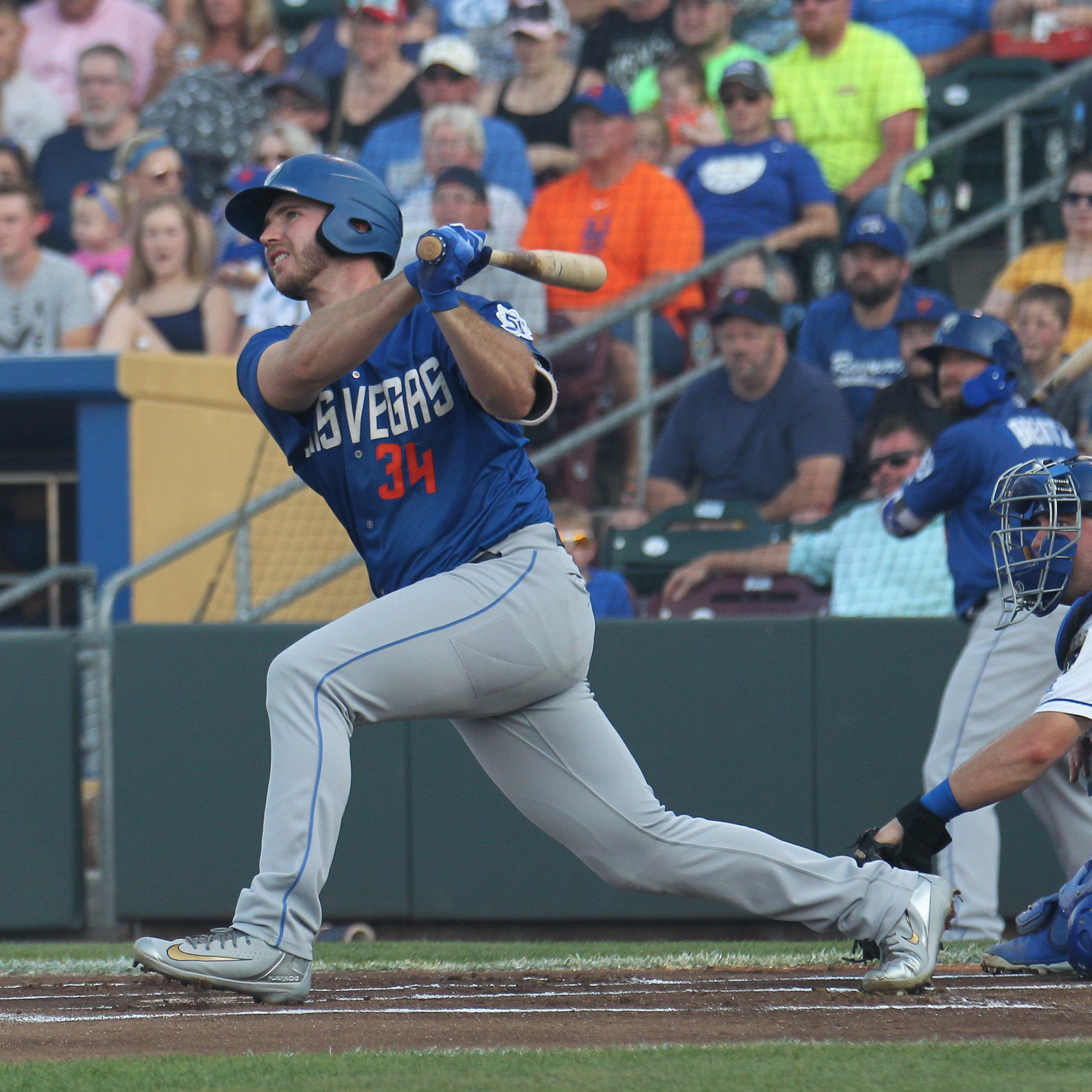
Alonso batting for the Las Vegas 51s in 2018

MLB.com ranked Alonso as New York's fourth-best prospect going into the 2018 season. He began the season in Binghamton, and received a midseason promotion to the Las Vegas 51s of the Triple–A Pacific Coast League. He represented the Mets in the 2018 All-Star Futures Game. In 132 games between Binghamton and Las Vegas, he slashed .285/.395/.579 with 36 home runs and 119 RBI. He won the Joe Bauman Home Run Award. That season, Alonso was the final batter in Cashman Field history, as he hit a walk-off home run in the bottom of the 9th inning during the last baseball game played at the facility.

=== New York Mets (2019–2025) ===
==== 2019 ====
Alonso made the Mets Opening Day roster in 2019 as the starting first baseman. He was in the team's starting lineup on Opening Day on March 28, and recorded his first major league hit against Washington Nationals pitcher Justin Miller in the 8th inning. On April 1, Alonso hit his first major league home run, off of Drew Steckenrider of the Miami Marlins leading the Mets to a 7–3 victory. On April 9, he had his first career multi-home run game against the Minnesota Twins in a Mets 14–8 loss.

Alonso became the first player in MLB history since 1900 with 11 extra-base hits in his first 10 career games. No other player ever had more than nine. In April, he batted .292 with 9 home runs, 8 doubles, one triple and 26 RBIs in his first games in the big leagues. With his performance, Alonso won the National League Rookie of the Month Award for April. His nine home runs led all MLB rookies and are tied for the most by a Mets player before May 1 with Neil Walker (2016), John Buck (2013), Carlos Delgado (2006), and Dave Kingman (1976).

On June 22, Alonso hit his 26th home run, breaking the National League record for most home runs by a rookie before the All-Star break, passing Cody Bellinger. The next day, with his 27th home run, he broke the Mets rookie home run record, previously set by Darryl Strawberry in 1983. On June 30, Alonso was selected as a reserve to the 2019 MLB All-Star Game. He also won the NL Rookie of the Month Award for the month of June.

On July 7, Alonso became the second player in Mets history to hit the most home runs (30) before the All-Star break, after Dave Kingman (1976). On July 8, Alonso won the 2019 Home Run Derby, defeating Toronto Blue Jays first baseman Vladimir Guerrero Jr. 23–22 in the final round, becoming only the second rookie after Aaron Judge to win the Derby outright. On the way to the final round, Alonso also beat Carlos Santana and Ronald Acuña Jr., hitting 57 total home runs during the entire Derby.

On August 15, Alonso hit his 39th home run, tying Cody Bellinger for the most home runs by a rookie in National League history. Alonso finished the game with a career-high 5 hits and 6 RBIs. He broke Bellinger's record on August 18 with his 40th home run in an 11–5 win against the Kansas City Royals. On August 27, Alonso hit his 42nd home run to become the Mets all-time single-season home run leader, surpassing Carlos Beltrán and Todd Hundley. He is the first rookie to set his franchise's single-season home run record since Johnny Rizzo did it for the Pittsburgh Pirates in 1938.

On September 27, Alonso hit his 52nd home run of the season, tying Aaron Judge for the most home runs by a rookie in MLB history. He hit his 53rd the next day off of Atlanta Braves pitcher Mike Foltynewicz to break Judge's record. In his rookie season, Alonso played in 161 games, batting .260/.358/.583 with 53 home runs and 120 RBI. His 53 homers led all of MLB for the 2019 season. After the season on November 11, Alonso was awarded the National League Rookie of the Year, receiving 29 of 30 first-place votes. On December 10, he was named to the first team of the inaugural All-MLB Team.

==== 2020 ====
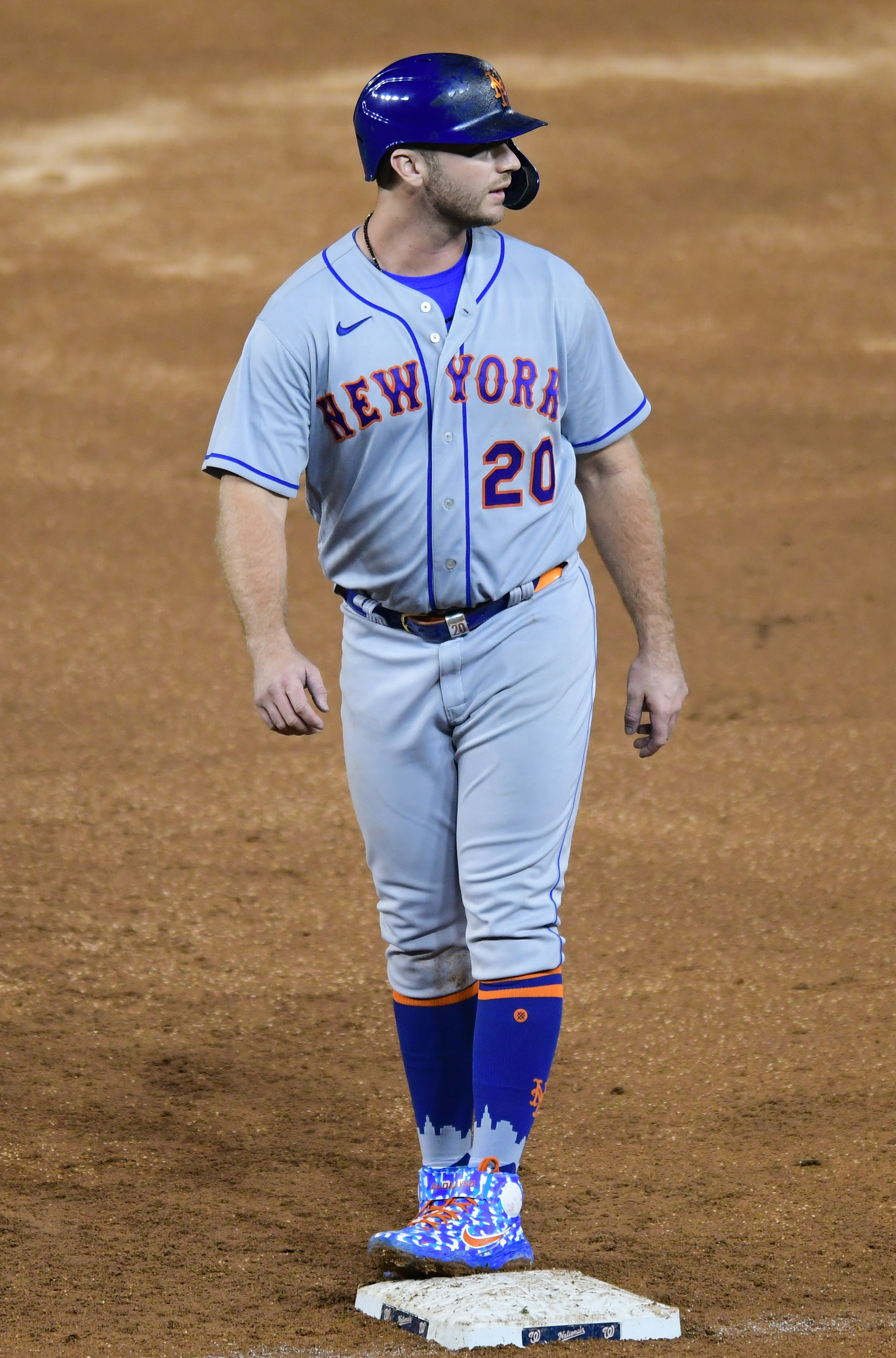
Alonso with the Mets in 2020

On September 3, 2020, Alonso hit his first career walk-off home run in a 9–7 victory against the New York Yankees. His sophomore season was a step back from his breakout rookie year; Danny Abriano of Yahoo Sports called it "a season to forget." However, he had the highest maximum exit velocity of all major league hitters, at 118.4 miles per hour (190.5 km/h). In the 2020 season shortened by COVID-19, Alonso played in 57 games and batted .231/.326/.490 with 16 home runs and 35 RBIs.

Alonso's sophomore slump coupled with a second consecutive breakout season from Dominic Smith led some talent evaluators to favor the latter as the team's starting first baseman heading into the 2021 season.

==== 2021 ====
On July 12, Alonso won his second straight Home Run Derby after defeating Baltimore Orioles first baseman Trey Mancini 23–22 in the final round. He became the third player ever to win back-to-back Derbies, as well as the fourth player to win two Derbies (after Ken Griffey Jr., Prince Fielder, and Yoenis Céspedes). Newsday Mets beat writer Tim Healey noted Alonso has earned $2 million from winning the Derby twice while making $1.47 million from 2019–2021 in base salary while playing for the Mets.

On September 7, Alonso hit his 100th career home run, off of Miami Marlins pitcher Edward Cabrera. He accomplished the feat in 347 games, becoming the second-fastest player to reach 100 career home runs behind Ryan Howard, who did it in 325 games. Alonso played in 152 games for the Mets in 2021, batting .262/.344/.519 with 37 home runs and 94 RBIs.

==== 2022 ====
On March 22, 2022, Alonso signed a one-year, $7.4 million contract with the Mets avoiding salary arbitration. He hit his first career grand slam on April 9 against the Washington Nationals off of pitcher Joan Adon in the 5th inning, leading the Mets to a 5–0 victory.

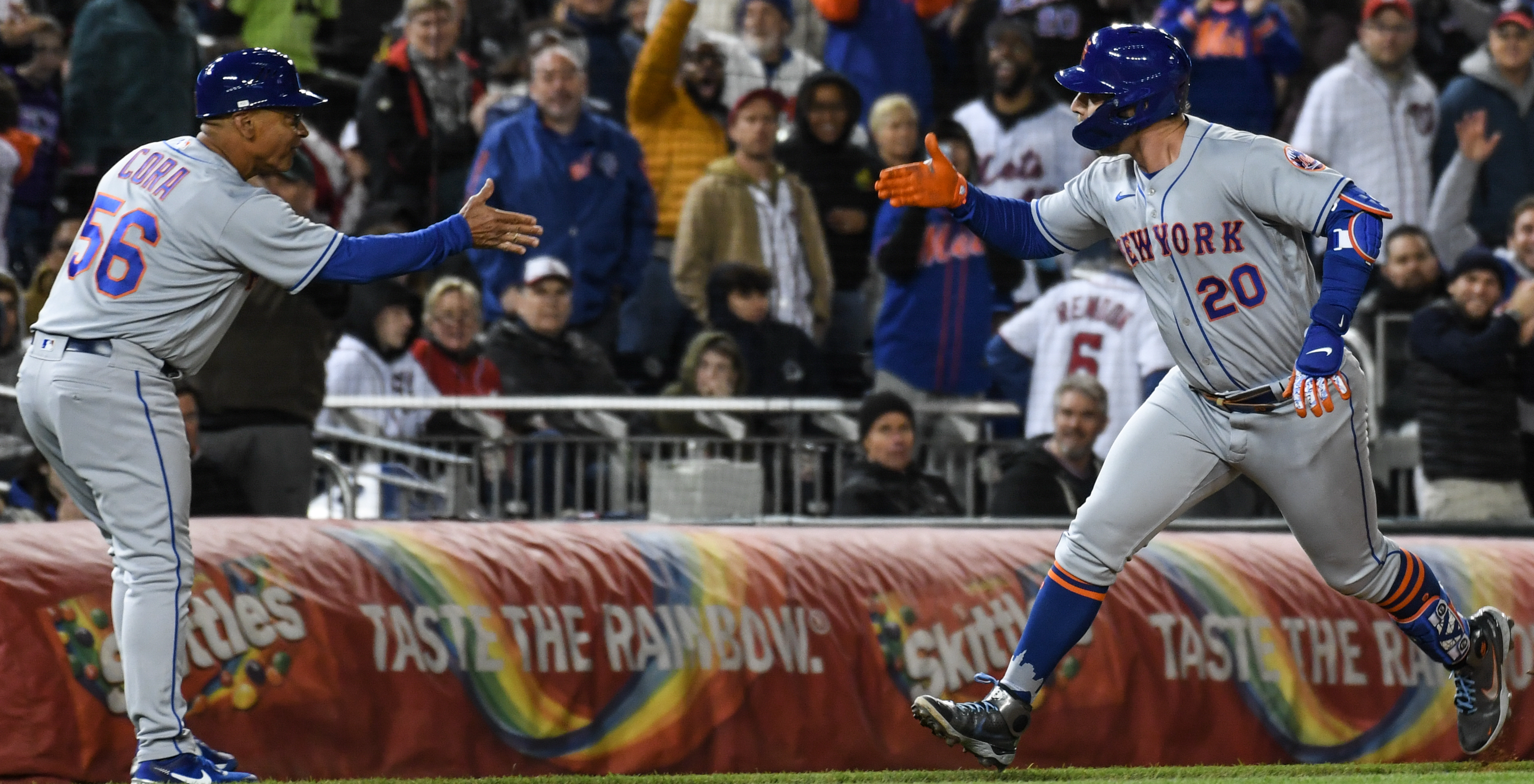
Alonso rounding the bases after hitting his first career grand slam in 2022

On July 10, Alonso was named to the 2022 MLB All-Star Game, the second selection of his career. He participated in the Home Run Derby, making it to the semifinals, but lost to Julio Rodríguez. In a September 25 game against the Oakland Athletics, Alonso drove in 5 runs, setting a new Mets' single-season RBI record with 125. He broke the record on a 451-foot (137 m) two-run home run in the 4th inning off of pitcher Norge Ruiz. The Mets previous RBI record was held by Mike Piazza (1999) and David Wright (2008).

On September 27 against the Miami Marlins, Alonso hit his 40th home run of the season, becoming the first Mets player to accomplish the feat twice. On October 8, during Game 2 of the NL Wild Card Series, Alonso hit the first postseason home run of his career, a tiebreaking solo shot in the 5th inning off of San Diego Padres reliever Nick Martinez, leading the Mets to a 7–3 victory.

Alonso played in 160 games for the Mets in 2022, batting .271/.352/.518 with 40 home runs and 131 RBIs, breaking the franchise record and tying Aaron Judge for the most RBI in the major leagues.

==== 2023 ====
On January 13, 2023, Alonso and the Mets agreed to a one-year, $14.5 million contract during the arbitration period. On April 7, during a game against the Miami Marlins, Alonso hit his 150th career home run, passing Carlos Beltrán for 6th place on the Mets all-time home run list. He also became the second fastest player to 150 home runs (in 538 games) since Ryan Howard (495 games).

On June 7, Alonso was placed on the injured list when he suffered a bone bruise and left wrist sprain after being hit by a pitch. He was expected to miss 3–4 weeks due to the injury, but recovered in just eleven days and was activated from the IL on June 18.

On July 2, Alonso was named to the 2023 MLB All-Star Game for the third selection of his career. He and Keith Hernandez were the only two Mets first basemen to be named to three All-Star teams.

On September 3, during a game against the Seattle Mariners, Alonso homered twice and drove in 4 runs, reaching 40-plus home runs and 100 RBIs for the second consecutive season. His two-run shot made him the fifth player in Major League history with at least three 40-home run seasons in his first five seasons of their career, joining Ralph Kiner (4 seasons), Eddie Mathews, Ryan Howard, and Albert Pujols (each with 3 seasons).

On September 27, Alonso hit his 46th home run of the season in an 11–2 win over the Miami Marlins. His 192nd career homer made him tie Howard Johnson for 4th place on the Mets all-time home run list. Alonso played in 154 games for the Mets in 2023, batting .217/.318/.504 with 46 home runs and 118 RBI.

==== 2024 ====
On January 11, 2024, the Mets and Alonso agreed on a one-year, $20.5 million contract to avoid salary arbitration. On April 4, during a game against the Detroit Tigers, Alonso recorded his 500th career RBI on a game-tying home run off of pitcher Alex Faedo, becoming the 10th and fastest player in Mets history to achieve the milestone. He won NL Player of the Week honors on April 15. On April 27 against the St. Louis Cardinals, Alonso hit his 200th career home run off of pitcher Sonny Gray, becoming the 4th-fastest player in MLB history to hit 200 home runs and the 4th Met to hit 200 career home runs.

On May 14, it was reported online that the Mets made an attempt to extend Alonso the previous season but they were unsuccessful, as he turned down a seven-year, $158 million contract extension from the team.

On July 7, Alonso was named to the 2024 MLB All-Star Game for the fourth selection of his career. He passed Keith Hernandez for the most appearances by a Mets first baseman.

Alonso hit his 220th career home run on August 27 against the Arizona Diamondbacks, tying Mike Piazza for 3rd-place on the Mets all-time home run list. Two days later, he would hit his 221st career homer, passing Piazza.

In 2024, Alonso played in all 162 games for the Mets, making him the second player in Mets history to appear in every game in a single-season, joining Félix Millán (1975). He finished the season batting .240/.329/.459 with 34 home runs and 88 RBI.

On October 3, in Game 3 the 2024 National League Wild Card Series against the Milwaukee Brewers, with the Mets down 2–0 in the top of the 9th inning, Alonso hit a go-ahead, three-run home run to give the Mets a 3–2 lead. They would then go on to win 4–2 and eliminate the Brewers from the playoffs. With that home run, Alonso became the first major league player in history to hit a go-ahead homer while trailing in the ninth inning or later of a winner-take-all postseason game. In the 2024 MLB postseason, Alonso played in 13 games for the Mets, batting .273/.431/.568 with 4 home runs and 10 RBI.

After the 2024 season, Alonso's contract with the Mets expired and became a free agent for the first time in his career. The Mets offered him a qualifying offer, which he declined.

==== 2025 ====
On February 12, 2025, after three months of back-and-forth negotiations with his agent Scott Boras, Alonso and the Mets agreed to a two-year, $54 million contract including an opt-out after the 2025 season.

On April 29, Alonso hit the 614th RBI of his career, a solo home run in an 8–3 victory over the Arizona Diamondbacks, tying Ed Kranepool for fifth place in franchise history. He passed Kranepool with a two-run homer against the St. Louis Cardinals three days later. By the end of April, he was slashing .342/.475/.649 with a 1.124 OPS, 7 home runs, and 28 RBI. With his performance, Alonso was named the National League Player of the Month for April for the first time in his career.

On June 1 against the Colorado Rockies, Alonso hit a three-run home run off of pitcher Carson Palmquist in the 4th inning, passing Howard Johnson for 4th place on the Mets all-time RBI list with 632. On June 8 against the Rockies at Coors Field, Alonso hit a two-run homer off of pitcher Tyler Kinley in the 8th inning, passing former captain David Wright for 2nd place on the Mets all-time home run list with 243. Between June 2 and 8, he went 12-for-30 (.400) with two doubles, 5 home runs, and 15 RBI in 7 games. Alonso was named the NL Player of the Week for that span.

On July 6, Alonso was named to the 2025 MLB All-Star Game, the fifth selection of his career. During the sixth inning, Alonso gave the National League a 5–0 lead after hitting a three-run home run off of Kansas City Royals pitcher Kris Bubic, becoming the third Met to homer in the All-Star Game, joining Lee Mazzilli (1979) and David Wright (2006).

On August 2 against the San Francisco Giants, Alonso hit a three-run home run off of pitcher Kai-Wei Teng in the 1st inning, for his 250th career home run. He became the second player in franchise history to accomplish the feat along with Darryl Strawberry, who reached that mark on September 18, 1990.

Facing the Atlanta Braves at Citi Field on August 12, Alonso hit his 253rd career home run to break Strawberry's record, a two-run shot off of Spencer Strider in the 3rd inning. He also hit his 254th homer off of pitcher Austin Cox in the 6th inning, for a total of 3 RBI on the day.

Alonso played in all 162 games for the Mets in 2025, slashing .272/.347/.524 with 38 home runs and 126 RBI. He led the National League with a career-high 41 doubles. He won his first ever Silver Slugger award for his efforts. On September 28, after the final game of the season, Alonso stated that he would opt out of his contract and elect free agency.

On November 3, 2025, Alonso opted out of his 2026 contract and became a free agent.

=== Baltimore Orioles (2026–present) ===
On December 11, 2025, Alonso signed a five-year, $155 million contract with the Baltimore Orioles.

==== 2026 ====
On September 15, 2026, Alonso hit his 300th career home run against his former team, the New York Mets. It was a game-tying home run at the top of the 9th inning with Alonso receiving a rare reverse curtain call from his former team's fans along with chants of "Fire Stearns."

Alonso finished the 2026 season batting .267/.363/.522 with 43 home runs and an AL-leading 113 RBI, making him the first player in MLB history to win the RBI title in both the American League and the National League. He won his second consecutive Silver Slugger award for his efforts.

== International career ==
On August 17, 2022, Alonso announced that he would also join the United States national baseball team in the 2023 World Baseball Classic. Alonso went 2-for-14 across five games, most notably starting an eighth inning rally with a base hit against Venezuela in the quarterfinals, and later hitting an RBI single against Cuba in the semifinals.

== Personal life ==
Alonso first got his "Polar Bear" nickname when he was a top prospect. He made such a big impression during spring training in 2019 that Mets third baseman Todd Frazier, who was known for giving players nicknames, is the one who coined it. Frazier said to Alonso, "You look like a big, damn polar bear." "And then it just kind of stuck," Alonso said during his rookie season.

Alonso met Haley Walsh in the summer of 2015, while he was playing in the Cape Cod collegiate summer league. She is originally from Boston. They carried on a long-distance relationship while he continued at the University of Florida and she attended Michigan State University. They were engaged in November 2018, and were married on November 12, 2021, at Sacred Heart Catholic Church in downtown Tampa. In April 2025, it was announced that they were expecting their first child, and in October 2025, she gave birth to their son. After Alonso joined the Orioles in December 2025, he announced he was changing his number from #20 (which was retired for Frank Robinson) to #25 because she gave birth to their son in 2025.

In 2020, the couple formed The Alonso Foundation, a charitable organization that supports youth, veteran, and animal causes.

On March 13, 2022, Alonso was involved in a car crash in Tampa, Florida, which he described as a "really close experience to death." A driver ran a red light and struck Alonso's vehicle, which flipped over three times. Neither Alonso nor anyone else involved in the incident was injured.

An avid outdoorsman, he enjoys hunting and fishing. He was also featured in a season 9 episode of MeatEater in which he hunted mule deer in Colorado with Steven Rinella.

== See also ==
- List of New York Mets team records
- List of Major League Baseball annual home run leaders
- List of Major League Baseball annual runs batted in leaders
- List of Major League Baseball annual doubles leaders
- List of Major League Baseball career hit by pitch leaders
- List of Major League Baseball career home run leaders
- List of Major League Baseball consecutive games played leaders

== Notes ==
Awards and achievements
Preceded by Shohei Ohtani	National League Player of the Month; April 2025	Succeeded by Shohei Ohtani
