= 2015 National League Championship Series =

Team (Wins)	Managers	Season
New York Mets (4)	Terry Collins	90–72 (.556), GA: 7
Chicago Cubs (0)	Joe Maddon	97–65 (.599), GB: 3
- Dates: October 17–21
- MVP: Daniel Murphy (New York)
- Umpires: Ted Barrett (crew chief), Eric Cooper, Rob Drake (Games 1–2), Tim Timmons, Paul Emmel, Bill Miller, and Mark Wegner (Games 3–4)

Broadcast
- Television: TBS
- TV announcers: Ernie Johnson, Cal Ripken Jr., Ron Darling, Matt Winer, and Sam Ryan
- Radio: ESPN
- Radio announcers: Jon Sciambi and Chris Singleton
- NLDS: Chicago Cubs over St. Louis Cardinals (3–1); New York Mets over Los Angeles Dodgers (3–2)

The 2015 National League Championship Series was a best-of-seven playoff in Major League Baseball’s 2015 postseason contested between the fifth-seeded Chicago Cubs and the third-seeded New York Mets for the National League (NL) pennant and the right to play in the 2015 World Series. The Mets swept the Cubs four games to none for their fifth National League pennant in franchise history. The series was the 46th in league history and TBS aired all games in the United States. Game 1 was played on October 17.

This was the first postseason meeting between the Mets and Cubs. For the first time in the history of the NLCS, the losing team never had a lead during a game. It was also the first since 2007 to end in a sweep and the third in the best-of-seven format to do so (the other being in 1995).

The Mets would go on to face the Kansas City Royals in the World Series, losing to them in five games.

== Background ==
The Chicago Cubs finished the 2015 season with a 97–65 record, the third best record in the majors. With new manager Joe Maddon and the great play of pitcher Jake Arrieta and hitters Anthony Rizzo and Kris Bryant, the Cubs experienced their best season since 2008 when they also won 97 games. Despite their record, the Cubs only finished third in the National League Central, received the second Wild Card bid and had to travel to play the Pittsburgh Pirates in the 2015 National League Wild Card Game, where they won 4–0. They then advanced to the NLCS by defeating the St. Louis Cardinals 3 games to 1 in the NLDS. This was the first time the Cubs won a postseason series at Wrigley Field. It was their first appearance in the NLCS since 2003 and their fourth appearance overall. It also snapped the Cardinals' NLCS appearance streak at four; they had appeared in every NLCS from 2011 to 2014, winning in 2011 and 2013.

The New York Mets made their first playoff appearance since 2006 with help from their starting pitchers Matt Harvey, Jacob deGrom and Noah Syndergaard as well the late season acquisition of hitter Yoenis Céspedes. The Mets finished 2015 with a 90–72 record, clinching the National League East on September 26 with a 10–2 victory over the Cincinnati Reds. They defeated the Los Angeles Dodgers in five games in the 2015 NLDS, their first playoff series played at Citi Field since its opening in 2009. This was the second straight NLDS in which the Mets clinched in L.A., advancing to the NLCS for the first time since 2006 and their eighth appearance overall.

As the National League East champions, the Mets held home field advantage over the Cubs, who qualified as a Wild Card team despite finishing with a better regular-season record.

During the 2015 regular season, the Cubs won all seven games against the Mets.

== Summary ==
New York won the series, 4–0.

Game	Date	Score	Location	Time	Attendance
1	October 17	Chicago Cubs – 2, New York Mets – 4	Citi Field	2:55	44,287
2	October 18	Chicago Cubs – 1, New York Mets – 4	Citi Field	3:07	44,502
3	October 20	New York Mets – 5, Chicago Cubs – 2	Wrigley Field	3:01	42,231
4	October 21	New York Mets – 8, Chicago Cubs – 3	Wrigley Field	3:32	42,227

== Game summaries ==
=== Game 1 ===
October 17, 2015 8:07 p.m. (EDT) at Citi Field in Queens, New York 45 °F (7 °C), mostly clear
Team	1	2	3	4	5	6	7	8	9	R	H	E
Chicago	0	0	0	0	1	0	0	1	0	2	5	0
New York	1	0	0	0	1	1	1	0	X	4	8	1
WP: Matt Harvey (1–0) LP: Jon Lester (0–1) Sv: Jeurys Familia (1); Home runs: CHC: Kyle Schwarber (1); NYM: Daniel Murphy (1), Travis d'Arnaud (1); Attendance: 44,287; Boxscore

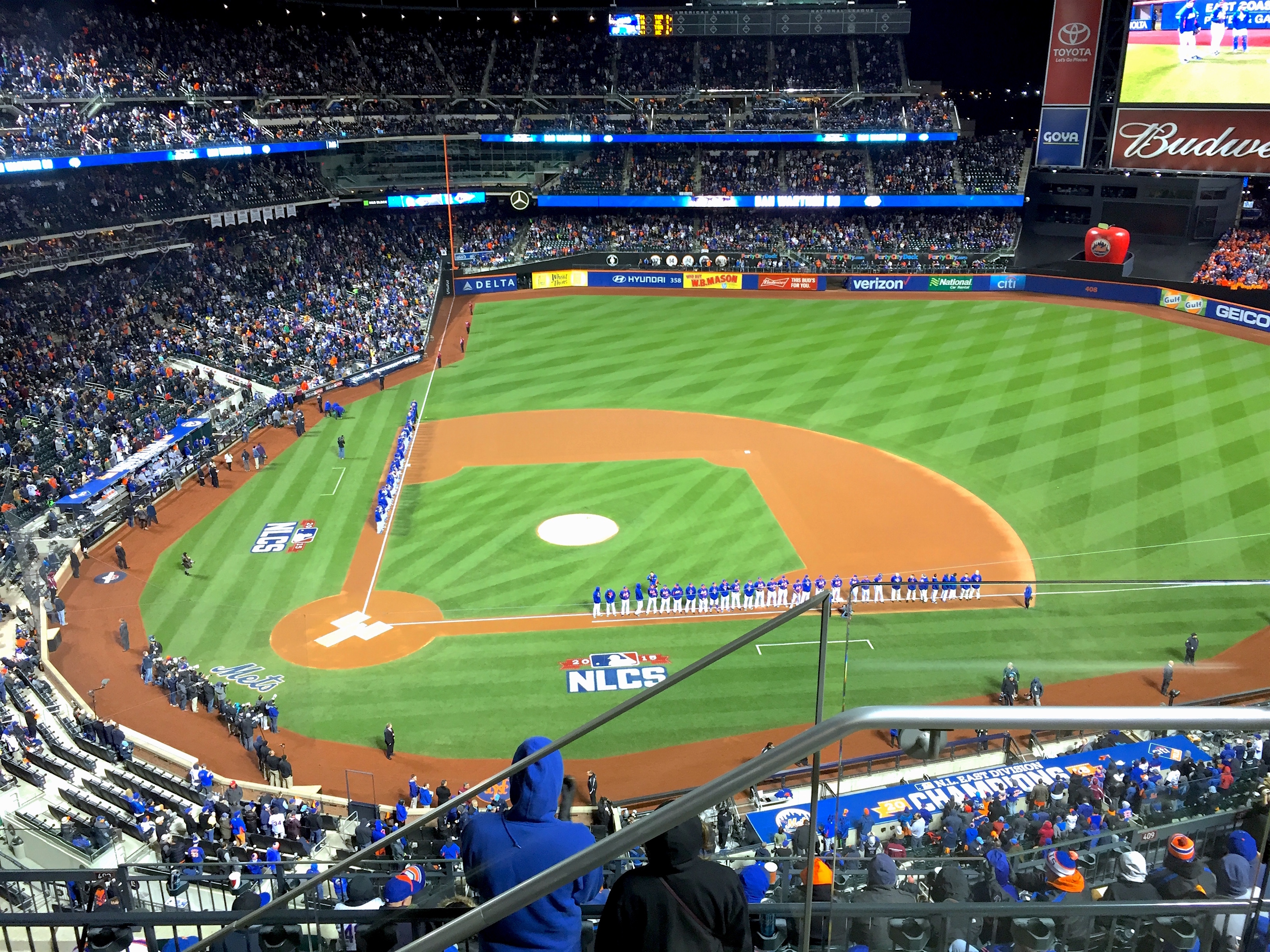
The Met and Cub reserves and coaches stand on the field for introductions before Game 1 at Citi Field.

Having used aces Jake Arrieta and Jacob deGrom late in their respective Division Series, the Cubs turned to Jon Lester and the Mets to Matt Harvey for Game 1 of the Championship Series. Daniel Murphy, fresh off a Division Series in which he hit three home runs, jumped Lester early on with a home run in the first inning. Lester would settle down, only allowing that lone run through four innings, but Harvey was even better, throwing four perfect innings as he blew away the Cubs hitters.

After getting ahead of Anthony Rizzo on an 0–2 count, Harvey came inside with a fastball and plunked the Cubs first baseman on the arm, allowing Rizzo to reach base as the first Cubs baserunner of the night. The next batter, Starlin Castro, jumped Harvey for a double that eluded the reach of Gold Glove winner Juan Lagares in center field that scored Rizzo and knotted the game at one. Harvey would retire the following batter, Jorge Soler, on a groundout to third, forcing Castro to hold at second, but subsequently allowed a base hit to left by Javier Báez. Testing the strong arm of left fielder Yoenis Céspedes, Castro attempted to score on the hit by Báez, but was thrown out at the plate by Céspedes in plenty of time, helping Harvey escape the inning having only allowed the one run.

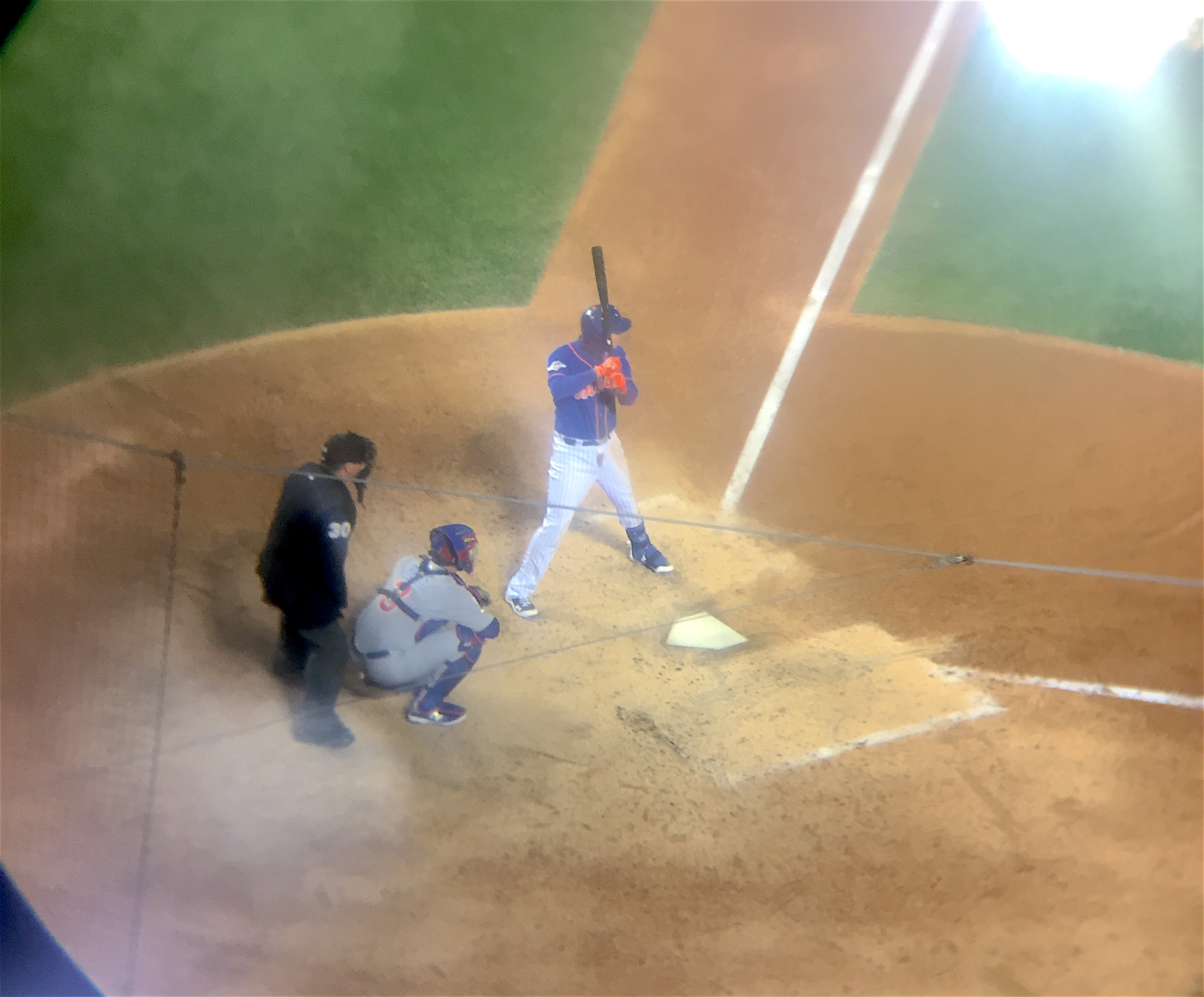
Flores batting before hitting his single.

In the bottom of the fifth, Wilmer Flores and Lagares would both reach on one-out singles against Lester, bringing up Harvey with runners on first and second. The Met starter attempted to move the runners over with a sacrifice bunt, but did so right towards the first baseman Rizzo who fired over to third to force out Flores for the second out of the inning. The third baseman Kris Bryant attempted to make a return throw to first base which may have forced out Harvey for a double play, but Bryant fumbled the ball from his glove hand to his throwing hand, allowing the inning to continue. The next batter, Curtis Granderson, then blooped a single into center field to score Lagares and help the Mets regain the lead.

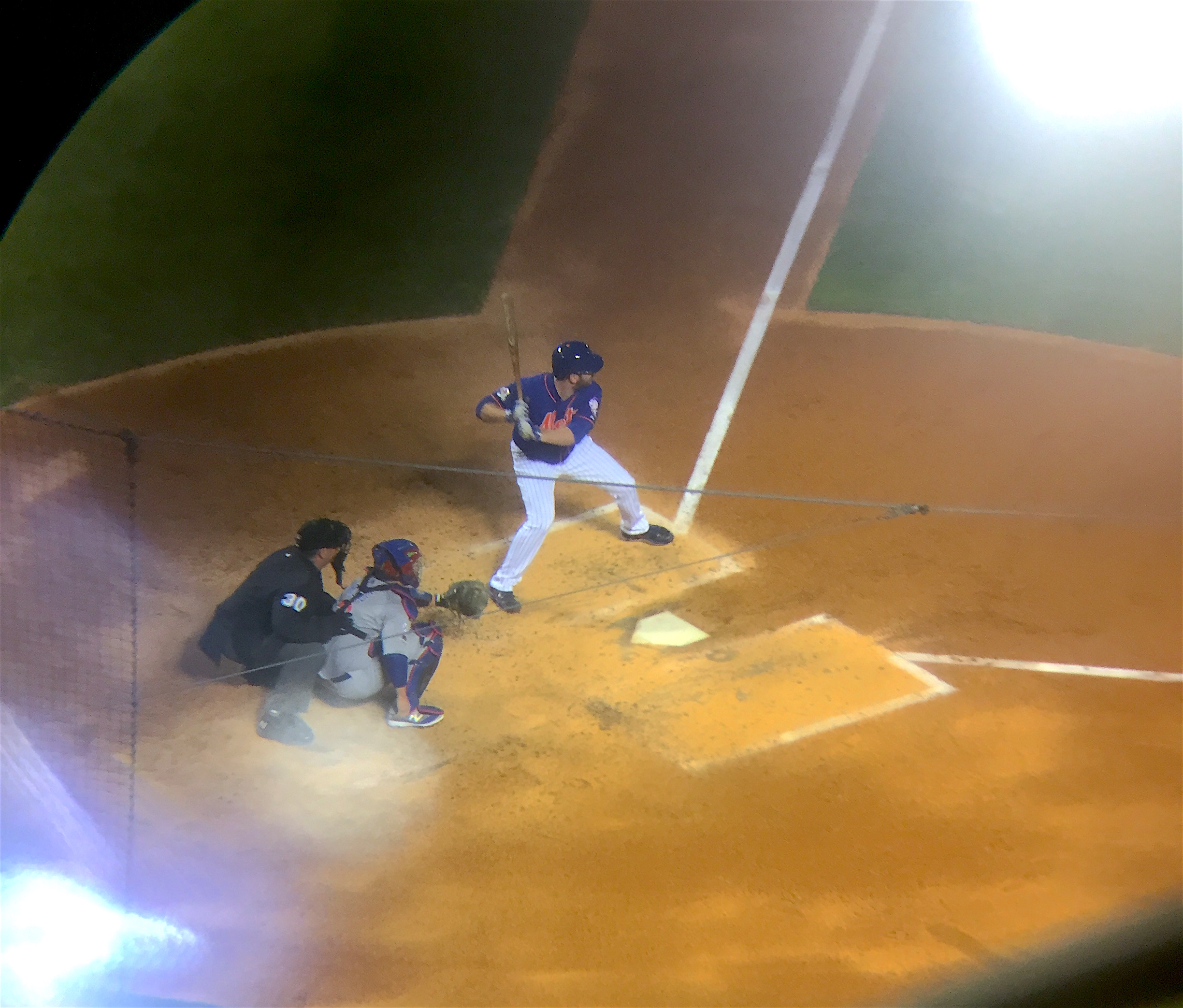
Harvey at-bat, before bunting into a fielder's choice.

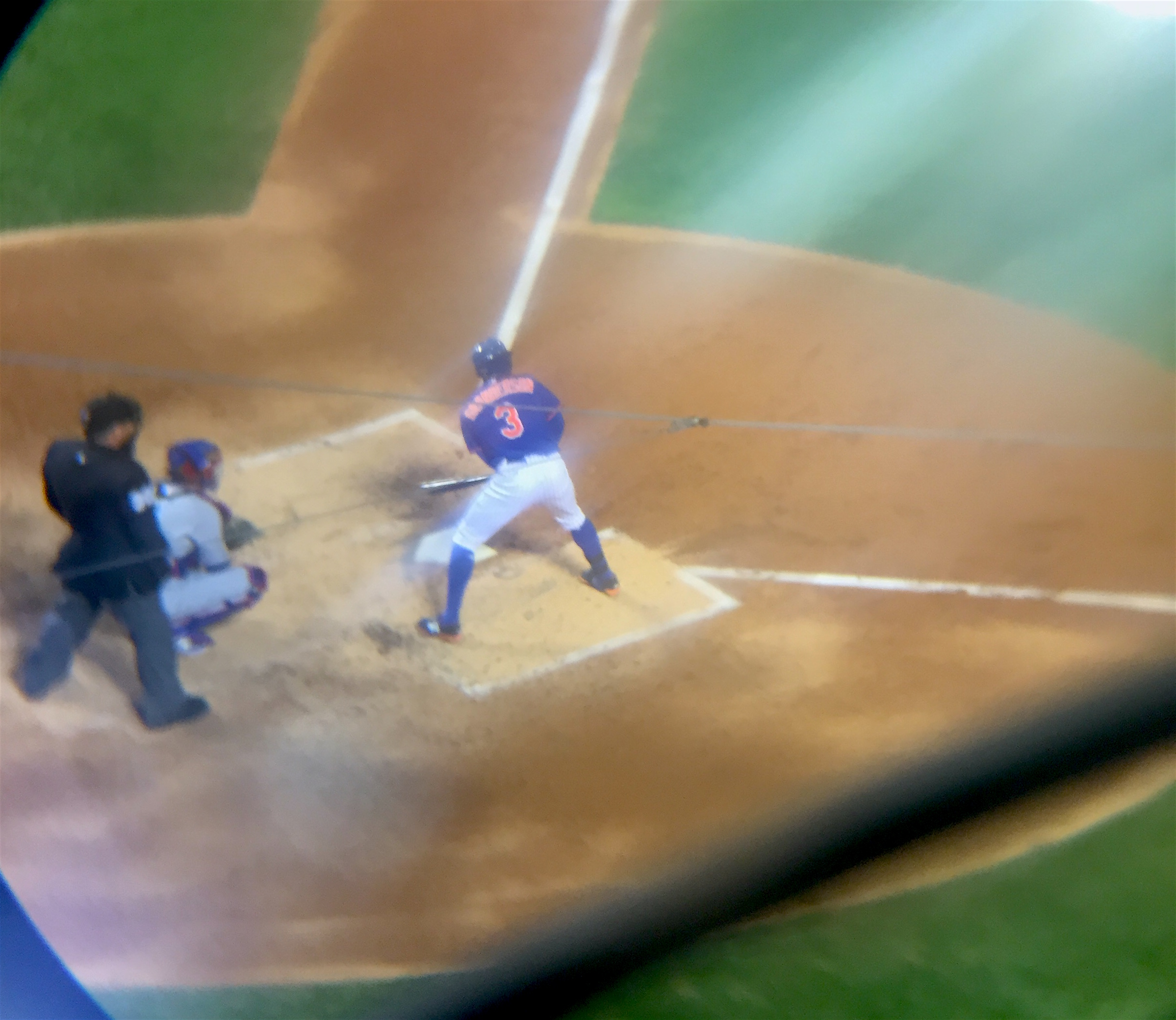
Granderson takes an at-bat before singling in Lagares.

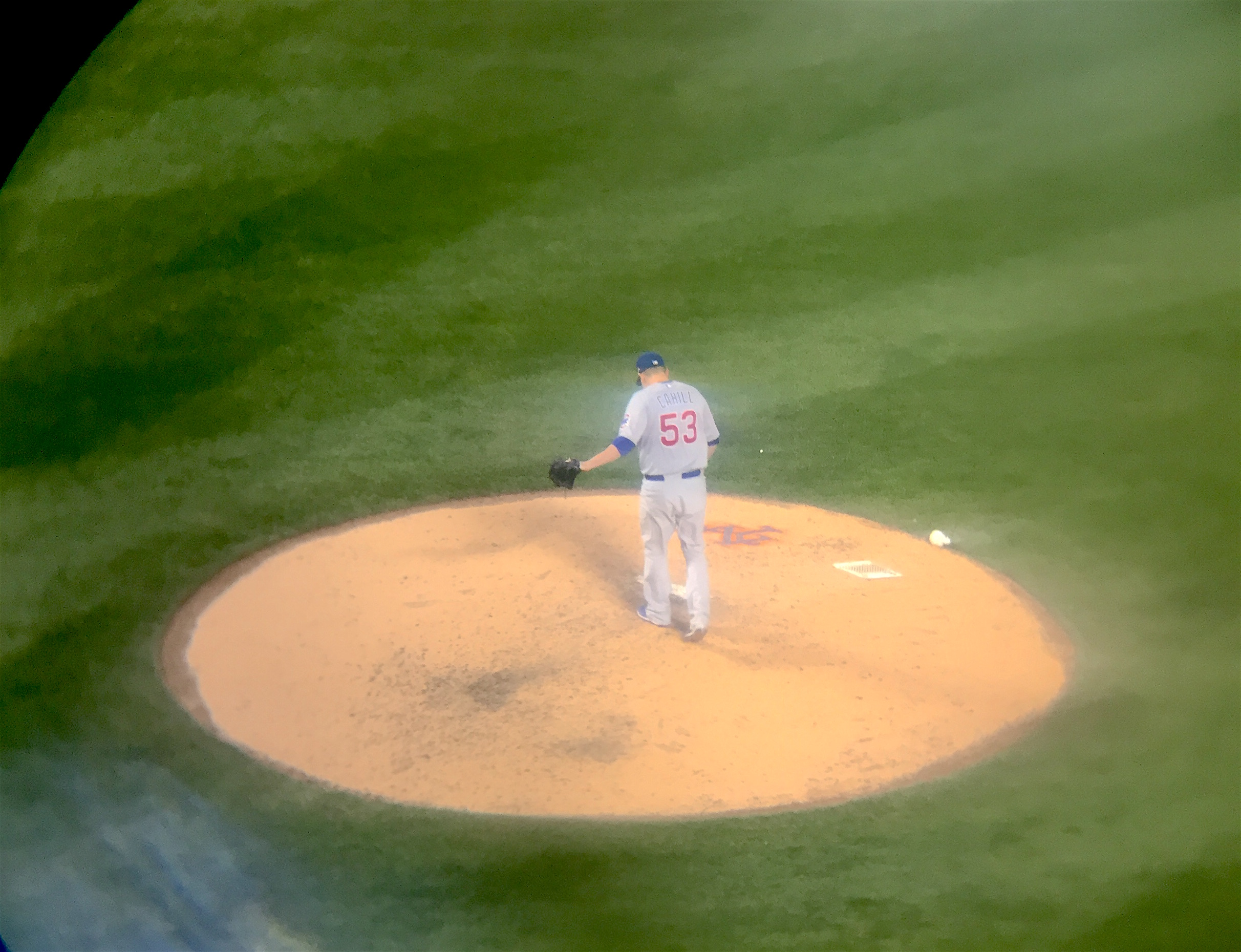
Trevor Cahill pitches for Chicago in Game 1.

Once again with the lead Harvey would regain control and blank the Cubs in the top halves of the sixth and seventh, while the Mets would add runs off of Lester. Travis d'Arnaud hit a home run in the sixth inning off of Citi Field's Home Run Apple in center field. The Mets would then manufacture another run in the seventh after a Lagares leadoff single. After Harvey sacrificed Lagares to second, the Met center fielder stole third with one out, setting up a Granderson sacrifice fly to make it a 4–1 game.

With Harvey still pitching into the eighth, Kyle Schwarber smoked a home run deep into the Cubs bullpen in right center, ending Harvey's night after 7 2/3 innings, having allowed only two runs and four hits to go along with nine strikeouts.

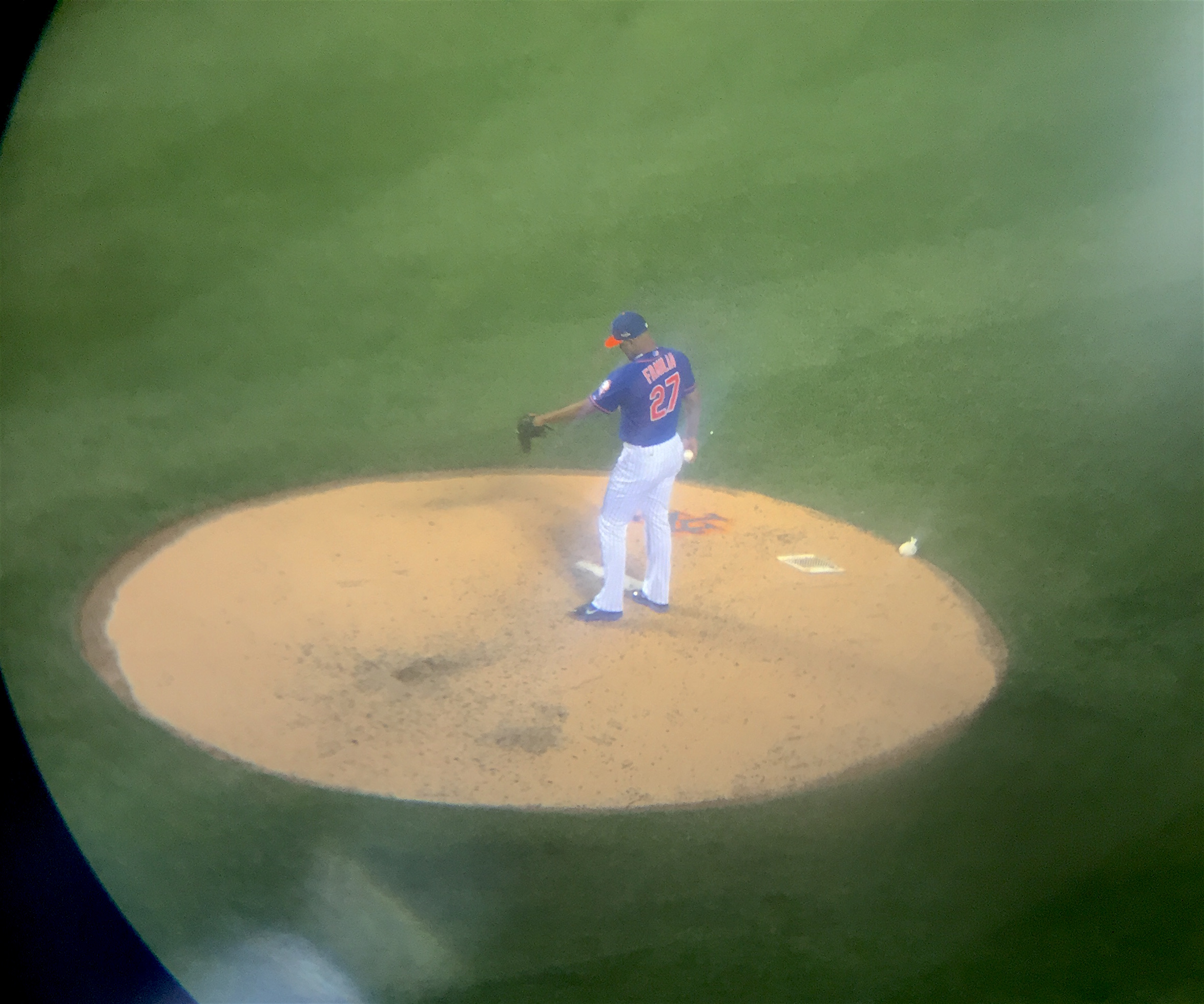
Familia enters for the save.

Mets closer Jeurys Familia came on for the 4-out save, and would finish it off for Harvey, getting help from a Murphy diving play for the last out of the game.

=== Game 2 ===
October 18, 2015 8:07 p.m. (EDT) at Citi Field in Queens, New York 41 °F (5 °C), clear
Team	1	2	3	4	5	6	7	8	9	R	H	E
Chicago	0	0	0	0	0	1	0	0	0	1	5	0
New York	3	0	1	0	0	0	0	0	X	4	5	0
WP: Noah Syndergaard (1–0) LP: Jake Arrieta (0–1) Sv: Jeurys Familia (2); Home runs: CHC: None; NYM: Daniel Murphy (2); Attendance: 44,502; Boxscore

Looking to rebound and tie the series, the Cubs turned to ace Jake Arrieta in a matchup against Mets rookie Noah Syndergaard. Much like in Game 1, the Mets got on the board in the first inning after a Curtis Granderson single, a David Wright RBI double, and a Daniel Murphy two-run home run to give the Mets a 3–0 lead through three batters against Arrieta. For Wright, it was his first hit and RBI since Game 1 of the NLDS. Murphy's home run extended his streak of consecutive postseason games with a home run to four, and also gave him five home runs for the entire postseason, a Mets record. The Mets added another run in the third on Yoenis Cespedes's RBI single to score Granderson.

The four runs were all Syndergaard needed. He pitched 5 2/3 innings, striking out nine while only walking one. He allowed only three hits, the last of which was a Kris Bryant RBI double that plated the only run against him and ended his outing in the sixth inning. Met relievers Jon Niese, Addison Reed, Tyler Clippard, and Jeurys Familia combined for 3 1/3 scoreless innings to finish off the win, giving the Mets a 2–0 series lead.

=== Game 3 ===
October 20, 2015 8:07 p.m. (EDT) at Wrigley Field in Chicago, Illinois 72 °F (22 °C), partly cloudy
Team	1	2	3	4	5	6	7	8	9	R	H	E
New York	1	0	1	0	0	1	2	0	0	5	11	0
Chicago	1	0	0	1	0	0	0	0	0	2	5	1
WP: Jacob deGrom (1–0) LP: Trevor Cahill (0–1) Sv: Jeurys Familia (3); Home runs: NYM: Daniel Murphy (3); CHC: Kyle Schwarber (2), Jorge Soler (1); Attendance: 42,231; Boxscore

Hosting their first NLCS game at Wrigley Field in 12 years, the Cubs started Kyle Hendricks in an attempt to pick up their first win of the series. Though Mets leadoff hitter Curtis Granderson reached base after an error by shortstop Javier Báez, he was caught stealing to negate the misplay. The Mets still scored one run in the frame after a Yoenis Céspedes RBI double, but the caught stealing proved costly as the Mets were unable to capitalize any further. The Cubs tied the game in the bottom half of the inning after a Kyle Schwarber opposite field home run off of Mets ace Jacob deGrom, but they too missed an opportunity to inflict further damage. Anthony Rizzo and Starlin Castro hit back-to-back two-out singles off of deGrom, but Jorge Soler grounded out to end the threat with the game still tied at 1–1.

Daniel Murphy continued his historic hot streak with yet another home run, a shot to center field to give the Mets back the lead in the top of the third. For Murphy, it was his sixth home run of the postseason, making him the all-time Mets postseason home run leader in just eight games. It was also his fifth consecutive postseason game with a home run, tying Carlos Beltrán's all-time mark from the 2004 postseason. The Cubs tied the game on a Soler home run in the fourth, but deGrom allowed nothing further. After a first inning where he gave up three hits, the only hit that deGrom allowed was the Soler home run. Meanwhile, Hendricks was pulled after four innings as Joe Maddon turned to his bullpen starting in the fifth.

Left-hander Clayton Richard escaped the fifth inning unscored upon after inducing a double play from Murphy to retire the side. Right-hander Trevor Cahill was called upon next for the sixth, and he promptly gave up a single to Céspedes to lead off the inning. The struggling Lucas Duda, at that point just 3-for-23 in the postseason, attempted to bunt against the infield shift, but was thrown out at first for what was ruled a sacrifice, advancing Céspedes to second. Céspedes then stole third base with one out, but Cahill retired Travis d'Arnaud on a ground out to third with the infield drawn in, forcing Céspedes to hold at third. The following batter, rookie Michael Conforto, saw nothing but curveballs from Cahill, who often bounced his curveballs despite the go-ahead run being on third base. Catcher Miguel Montero was up to the task of blocking Cahill's curveballs in the dirt until the 2-2 pitch when Conforto chased another curveball for strike three. Montero could not handle this last curveball, allowing it to get past him and roll to the backstop. Conforto would reach first safely after the uncaught third strike while Céspedes scored to give the Mets back the lead for the third time.

The Mets were presented with more opportunities in the seventh due to more defensive miscues by the Cubs. With one out and facing new reliever Travis Wood, David Wright doubled down the line in left, narrowly beating the throw from the left fielder Schwarber. The next batter Murphy hit a soft tapper towards the hole between the third baseman Kris Bryant and the shortstop Báez. Bryant fielded the ball moving to his left but double-clutched before throwing to first, allowing Murphy to reach safely for an infield single as Wright advanced to third. Looking for a strikeout, Maddon inserted Justin Grimm to replace Wood, but Céspedes would follow with a line drive to deep left that glanced off of Schwarber's glove, going for what was ruled to be a long RBI single with Wright scoring, Murphy advancing to third, and Céspedes reaching second after Schwarber's throw went to third. Duda followed with a run-scoring groundout fielded by Rizzo, who elected to step on first base to force out Duda before throwing home, giving Murphy extra time to score from third.

With the Mets up 5–2, deGrom shut the Cubs down with a perfect seventh inning, ending his night having only allowed four hits and two runs while striking out seven. He would pick up the win after Jeurys Familia finished off the ninth for his third save in as many games in the series and his fifth save of the postseason, giving the Mets a commanding 3–0 series lead.

=== Game 4 ===
October 21, 2015 8:07 p.m. (EDT) at Wrigley Field in Chicago, Illinois 72 °F (22 °C), partly cloudy
Team	1	2	3	4	5	6	7	8	9	R	H	E
New York	4	2	0	0	0	0	0	2	0	8	11	0
Chicago	0	0	0	1	0	0	0	2	0	3	6	0
WP: Bartolo Colón (1–0) LP: Jason Hammel (0–1); Home runs: NYM: Lucas Duda (1), Travis d'Arnaud (2), Daniel Murphy (4); CHC: Kris Bryant (1); Attendance: 42,227; Boxscore

The Cubs entered Game 4 facing the daunting task of having to overcome a 3–0 series deficit, done only once in MLB history when the 2004 World Series champion Boston Red Sox defeated the New York Yankees after losing the first three games of the ALCS. Attempting to repeat the accomplishment was Cubs president of baseball operations Theo Epstein, who was the general manager of the Red Sox in 2004.

However, as had happened in every previous game of the series, the Mets took the first lead of the game in the first inning. Lucas Duda, just 1-for-6 in the series in the first three games, launched a three-run home run to center field against Cubs starter Jason Hammel to get the Mets off to a fast start again. The next batter, Travis d'Arnaud, also took Hammel deep with an opposite field home run to make it 4–0 before the Cubs would even step up to the plate. After Mets starter Steven Matz quickly retired the side in order in the bottom of the first, Hammel issued a one-out walk to David Wright in top of the second, ending his night as Joe Maddon quickly went to his bullpen. Reliever Travis Wood allowed a two-run double to Duda later in the inning, making it a 6–0 game.

Matz held the Cubs hitless through three innings, but Chicago mounted its first rally in the bottom of the fourth, loading the bases with nobody out for Starlin Castro. Though Castro hit a bullet of a line drive, Wright made a leaping grab at third base to save an extra base hit and at least two runs. The Cubs would score their first run after an RBI groundout from Kyle Schwarber, but Javier Báez popped out in foul territory near the Cubs bullpen, stranding two runners and leaving the Cubs still down 6–1.

In the bottom of the fifth inning, Matz looked as though he would retire the Cubs in order, but with two outs a Dexter Fowler fly ball dropped into shallow right field after a misplay by second baseman Daniel Murphy. Fowler, however, was not hustling out of the batter's box and thus only made it to first base. He was not in scoring position when the next batter Jorge Soler singled. Matz was chased from the game as Bartolo Colón was called upon to make his first relief appearance of the series. The veteran Colón struck out Kris Bryant and again the Cubs stranded two baserunners.

The Mets themselves wasted opportunities to extend their lead, getting Wilmer Flores on third to lead off the top of the sixth as well as having the bases loaded in the top of the seventh, but never scoring in either inning. However, in the top of the eighth inning, New York padded its lead with a two-run home run from Murphy, his fourth home run of the series, his seventh of the postseason, and his sixth consecutive game with a home run, a new postseason record. Though Bryant hit a two-run home run in the bottom of the eighth off Tyler Clippard, he allowed nothing more. Jeurys Familia finished off the sweep by striking out Fowler, sending the Mets to the World Series for the first time since 2000. After hitting .529 with the four home runs and a 1.294 slugging percentage for the series, Murphy was named series MVP.

By coincidence, the Cubs' 2015 season ended on the same day as the 2015 World Series that was depicted in the 1989 movie Back to the Future Part II. In the film, the Cubs swept a fictitious Miami team. The actual 2015 World Series saw the Mets lose to the Kansas City Royals in five games, but the Cubs went on to win the next season's edition, defeating the Cleveland Indians in seven.

This was the only pennant won by a New York City team during the 2010s decade.

=== Composite line score ===
2015 NLCS (4–0): New York Mets beat Chicago Cubs

Team	1	2	3	4	5	6	7	8	9	R	H	E
Chicago Cubs	1	0	0	2	1	1	0	3	0	8	21	1
New York Mets	9	2	2	0	1	2	3	2	0	21	35	1
Total attendance: 173,247 Average attendance: 43,312

== Aftermath ==
=== New York Mets ===
Following their sweep of the Cubs, the Mets advanced to the World Series for the first time since 2000. They would fall to the Kansas City Royals in a competitive five-game series.

Despite the World Series loss and losing Daniel Murphy in free agency, the team's young pitching staff led by Jacob deGrom, Noah Syndergaard, Steven Matz, and Matt Harvey was viewed as a promising core. The Mets returned to the postseason in 2016, but their appearance was brief, as they lost to the San Francisco Giants in the National League Wild Card Game. Over the next few years, injuries and underperformance plagued the team, particularly affecting their once-vaunted starting rotation. After several significant injuries, Harvey would be traded to the Cincinnati Reds, while Syndergaard and deGrom also battled injury setbacks, and Matz dealt with inconsistency. Despite these challenges, deGrom emerged as one of the best pitchers in baseball, winning back-to-back Cy Young Awards in 2018 and 2019. Ironically, it was Zack Wheeler, another young promising starter from this core who missed all of 2015 with Tommy John Surgery, who had the healthiest and arguably most productive career going forward.

The 2016 Wild Card Game match-up versus the San Francisco Giants was the last postseason game under the Wilpon family. In 2020, billionaire Steve Cohen purchased the team, injecting new financial resources and optimism into the franchise.

=== Chicago Cubs ===
Under Maddon, and with a roster brimming with young talent such as Bryant, Rizzo, and Báez, the Cubs bounced back in 2016. After a regular season that saw them win 103 games, they won their first World Series title in 108 years, defeating the Cleveland Indians in a memorable seven-game series. The Cubs' historic victory cemented their place in baseball history and broke the legendary Curse of the Billy Goat. They remained competitive in the proceeding years, reaching the NLCS the following year, in 2017, which is the farthest they have been in the postseason, to date. In a fate similar to the 1986 Mets, the 2016 Cubs could not build off what looked like a future dynasty. The 2021 season marked the end of an era for the Cubs, as the front office opted for a major rebuild, trading away core players like Bryant, Rizzo, and Báez at the trade deadline.
