= 2017 New York Mets season =

2017 New York Mets
- League: National League
- Division: East
- Ballpark: Citi Field
- City: New York City, New York
- Record: 70–92 (.432)
- Divisional place: 4th
- Owners: Fred Wilpon
- General manager: Sandy Alderson
- Manager: Terry Collins
- Television: SportsNet New York; PIX 11 (CW affiliate) (Gary Cohen, Ron Darling, Keith Hernandez)
- Radio: WOR Radio 710 AM (English); New York Mets Radio Network (Howie Rose, Josh Lewin, Wayne Randazzo); Que Buena 92.7 (Spanish) (Juan Alicea, Max Perez Jiminez)

The 2017 New York Mets season was the franchise's 56th season and the team's 9th season at Citi Field. The Mets opened the season on April 3 against the Atlanta Braves and finished the season on October 1 against the Philadelphia Phillies at Citizens Bank Park.

Just two years removed from a World Series appearance, the Mets had high expectations. However, the season was a major disappointment with injuries to key players, poor performances from players such as Yoenis Céspedes, Matt Harvey, and Robert Gsellman, and by controversy within the organization and around players. The Mets finished in 4th place in their division, missed the playoffs for the first time since 2014, and finished with a 70–92 record, equalizing their worst record since 2009. Manager Terry Collins announced his retirement following the final game of the season.

== Offseason ==
On November 14, 2016, second baseman Neil Walker accepted a qualifying offer, returning to the Mets for $17.2 million.

On October 29, 2016, outfielder Yoenis Céspedes re-signed with the Mets on a four-year, $110 million contract. This was the Mets second biggest free agent signing in their history at the time after Carlos Beltrán's $119 million deal in 2005.

On January 27, 2017, loogy Jerry Blevins re-signed with the Mets on a one-year deal with an option for 2018.

On February 15, 2017, pitcher Fernando Salas re-signed with the Mets on a one-year deal.

== Season standings ==
=== National League East ===
NL East
Team	W	L	Pct.	GB	Home	Road
Washington Nationals	97	65	.599	—	47‍–‍34	50‍–‍31
Miami Marlins	77	85	.475	20	42‍–‍36	35‍–‍49
Atlanta Braves	72	90	.444	25	37‍–‍44	35‍–‍46
New York Mets	70	92	.432	27	37‍–‍44	33‍–‍48
Philadelphia Phillies	66	96	.407	31	39‍–‍42	27‍–‍54

=== National League division leaders ===
Division leaders
Team	W	L	Pct.
Los Angeles Dodgers	104	58	.642
Washington Nationals	97	65	.599
Chicago Cubs	92	70	.568

Wild Card teams (Top 2 teams qualify for postseason)
Team	W	L	Pct.	GB
Arizona Diamondbacks	93	69	.574	+6
Colorado Rockies	87	75	.537	—
Milwaukee Brewers	86	76	.531	1
St. Louis Cardinals	83	79	.512	4
Miami Marlins	77	85	.475	10
Pittsburgh Pirates	75	87	.463	12
Atlanta Braves	72	90	.444	15
San Diego Padres	71	91	.438	16
New York Mets	70	92	.432	17
Cincinnati Reds	68	94	.420	19
Philadelphia Phillies	66	96	.407	21
San Francisco Giants	64	98	.395	23

=== Record vs. opponents ===
2017 National League record Source: MLB Standings Grid – 2017
Team	AZ	ATL	CHC	CIN	COL	LAD	MIA	MIL	NYM	PHI	PIT	SD	SF	STL	WSH	AL
Arizona	—	2–4	3–3	3–3	11–8	11–8	3–4	4–3	6–1	6–1	4–3	11–8	12–7	3–4	2–4	12–8
Atlanta	4–2	—	1–6	3–3	3–4	3–4	11–8	4–2	7–12	6–13	2–5	5–2	4–3	1–5	9–10	9–11
Chicago	3–3	6–1	—	12–7	2–5	2–4	4–3	10–9	4–2	4–3	10–9	2–4	4–3	14–5	3–4	12–8
Cincinnati	3–3	3–3	7–12	—	3–4	0–6	2–5	8–11	3–4	4–2	13–6	3–4	4–3	9–10	1–6	5–15
Colorado	8–11	4–3	5–2	4–3	—	10–9	2–4	4–3	3–3	5–2	3–3	12–7	12–7	2–4	3–4	10–10
Los Angeles	8–11	4–3	4–2	6–0	9–10	—	6–1	3–3	7–0	4–3	6–1	13–6	11–8	4–3	3–3	16–4
Miami	4–3	8–11	3–4	5–2	4–2	1–6	—	2–4	12–7	8–11	3–4	5–1	5–1	2–5	6–13	9–11
Milwaukee	3–4	2–4	9–10	11–8	3–4	3–3	4–2	—	5–2	3–3	9–10	5–2	3–4	11–8	4–3	11–9
New York	1–6	12–7	2–4	4–3	3–3	0–7	7–12	2–5	—	12–7	3–3	3–4	5–1	3–4	6–13	7–13
Philadelphia	1–6	13–6	3–4	2–4	2–5	3–4	11–8	3–3	7–12	—	2–5	1–5	4–3	1–5	8–11	5–15
Pittsburgh	3–4	5–2	9–10	6–13	3–3	1–6	4–3	10–9	3–3	5–2	—	3–3	1–5	8–11	4–3	10–10
San Diego	8–11	2–5	4–2	4–3	7–12	6–13	1–5	2–5	4–3	5–1	3–3	—	12–7	3–4	2–5	8–12
San Francisco	7–12	3–4	3–4	3–4	7–12	8–11	1–5	4–3	1–5	3–4	5–1	7–12	—	3–4	1–5	8–12
St. Louis	4–3	5–1	5–14	10–9	4–2	3–4	5–2	8–11	4–3	5–1	11–8	4–3	4–3	—	3–3	8–12
Washington	4–2	10–9	4–3	6–1	4–3	3–3	13–6	3–4	13–6	11–8	3–4	5–2	5–1	3–3	—	10–10

=== Opening Day ===
Opening Day Starters
Name	Position
José Reyes	3B
Asdrúbal Cabrera	SS
Yoenis Céspedes	LF
Curtis Granderson	CF
Neil Walker	2B
Jay Bruce	RF
Lucas Duda	1B
Rene Rivera	C
Noah Syndergaard	P

The Mets began their 2017 season with a 6–0 win over the Atlanta Braves.

=== Game log ===
Legend
Mets Win	Mets Loss	Game Postponed
Bold = Mets team member

2017 Game Log
Overall: 70–92 (Home: 37–44; Away: 33–48)
April: 10–14 (Home: 4–10; Away: 6–4)

#	Date	Opponent	Box Score	Win	Loss	Save	Location (Attendance)	Record
1	April 3	Braves	6–0	**Robles** (1–0)	Krol (0–1)	–	**Citi Field** (44,384)	1–0
2	April 5	Braves	1–3 (12)	Johnson (1–0)	**Montero** (0–1)	–	**Citi Field** (36,137)	1–1
3	April 6	Braves	6–2	**Harvey** (1–0)	García (0–1)	—	**Citi Field** (23,100)	2–1
4	April 7	Marlins	2–7	Chen (1–0)	**Wheeler** (0–1)	—	**Citi Field** (27,891)	2–2
5	April 8	Marlins	1–8	Conley (1–0)	**Gsellman** (0–1)	—	**Citi Field** (33,936)	2–3
6	April 9	Marlins	5–2	**Syndergaard** (1–0)	Volquez (0–1)	**Reed** (1)	**Citi Field** (27,420)	3–3
7	April 10	@ Phillies	4–3	**Blevins** (1–0)	Ramos (0–1)	**Reed** (2)	Citizens Bank Park (33,359)	4–3
8	April 11	@ Phillies	14–4	**Harvey** (2–0)	Buchholz (0–1)	—	Citizens Bank Park (28,659)	5–3
9	April 12	@ Phillies	5–4	**Wheeler** (1–1)	Velasquez (0–2)	**Reed** (3)	Citizens Bank Park (28,272)	6–3
10	April 13	@ Marlins	9–8 (16)	**Robles** (2–0)	Conley (1–1)	—	Marlins Park (23,192)	7–3
11	April 14	@ Marlins	2–3	Ramos (1–1)	**Edgin** (0–1)	—	Marlins Park (24,194)	7–4
12	April 15	@ Marlins	4–5	Tazawa (1–0)	**Salas** (0–1)	Ramos (2)	Marlins Park (25,137)	7–5
13	April 16	@ Marlins	2–4	Phelps (2–1)	**Reed** (0–1)	—	Marlins Park (20,058)	7–6
14	April 18	Phillies	2–6 (10)	García (1–0)	**Montero** (0–2)	—	**Citi Field** (23,536)	7–7
15	April 19	Phillies	5–4	**Robles** (3–0)	Ramos (0–2)	**Reed** (4)	**Citi Field** (22,243)	8–7
16	April 20	Phillies	4–6	Nola (2–0)	**Syndergaard** (1–1)	Neris (1)	**Citi Field** (24,656)	8–8
17	April 21	Nationals	3–4 (11)	Romero (1–0)	**Smoker** (0–1)	Kelley (3)	**Citi Field** (34,773)	8–9
18	April 22	Nationals	1–3	Gonzalez (2–0)	**DeGrom** (0–1)	Glover (1)	**Citi Field** (42,145)	8–10
19	April 23	Nationals	3–6	Scherzer (3–1)	**Wheeler** (1–2)	Glover (2)	**Citi Field** (27,044)	8–11
	April 25	Braves	Postponed (rain); rescheduled for September 25 as part of a doubleheader				**Citi Field**	
20	April 26	Braves	2–8	Teherán (2–1)	**Gsellman** (0–2)	—	**Citi Field** (22,819)	8–12
21	April 27	Braves	5–7	Dickey (2–2)	**Harvey** (2–1)	—	**Citi Field** (23,243)	8–13
22	April 28	@ Nationals	7–5	**DeGrom** (1–1)	Scherzer (3–2)	**Edgin** (1)	Nationals Park (34,562)	9–13
23	April 29	@ Nationals	5–3	**Robles** (4–0)	Strasburg (2–1)	**Familia** (1)	Nationals Park (36,501)	10–13
24	April 30	@ Nationals	5–23	Albers (1–0)	**Syndergaard** (1–2)	–	Nationals Park (36,806)	10–14

May: 13–14 (Home: 9–6; Away: 4–8)

#	Date	Opponent	Box Score	Win	Loss	Save	Location (Attendance)	Record
25	May 1	@ Braves	7–5	**Gsellman** (1–2)	Teherán (2–1)	**Familia** (2)	SunTrust Park (21,668)	11–14
26	May 2	@ Braves	7–9	Dickey (3–2)	**Harvey** (2–2)	Johnson (5)	SunTrust Park (21,359)	11–15
27	May 3	@ Braves	16–5	**deGrom** (2–1)	Colón (1–3)	—	SunTrust Park (22,656)	12–15
	May 4	@ Braves	Postponed (rain); Rescheduled for June 10 as part of a doubleheader				SunTrust Park	
28	May 5	Marlins	8–7	**Blevins** (2–0)	Ziegler (1–2)	**Familia** (3)	**Citi Field** (25,618)	13–15
29	May 6	Marlins	11–3	**Gsellman** (2–2)	Despaigne (0–1)	—	**Citi Field** (33,339)	14–15
30	May 7	Marlins	0–7	Ureña (1–0)	**Wilk** (0–1)	—	**Citi Field** (39,197)	14–16
31	May 8	Giants	4–3	**Familia** (1–0)	Osich (0–1)	—	**Citi Field** (28,453)	15–16
32	May 9	Giants	6–1	**Wheeler** (2–2)	Samardzija (0–5)	—	**Citi Field** (29,030)	16–16
33	May 10	Giants	5–6	Morris (1–0)	**Familia** (1–1)	Law (2)	**Citi Field** (31,066)	16–17
34	May 12	@ Brewers	4–7	Garza (2–0)	**Harvey** (2–3)	Hughes (1)	Miller Park (28,306)	16–18
35	May 13	@ Brewers	4–11	Davies (4–2)	**Gsellman** (2–3)	—	Miller Park (33,849)	16–19
36	May 14	@ Brewers	9–11	Feliz (1–4)	**Reed** (0–2)	Knebel (1)	Miller Park (30,623)	16–20
37	May 15	@ Diamondbacks	3–7	de la Rosa (2–0)	**Robles** (4–1)	—	Chase Field (15,988)	16–21
38	May 16	@ Diamondbacks	4–5	Greinke (5–2)	**Milone** (1–1)	Rodney (10)	Chase Field (17,471)	16–22
39	May 17	@ Diamondbacks	4–5 (11)	Wilhelmsen (1–1)	**Montero** (0–3)	—	Chase Field (19,842)	16–23
40	May 19	Angels	3–0	**deGrom** (3–1)	Nolasco (2–3)	**Reed** (5)	**Citi Field** (36,542)	17–23
41	May 20	Angels	7–5	**Wheeler** (3–2)	Meyer (2–2)	**Reed** (6)	**Citi Field** (37,264)	18–23
42	May 21	Angels	5–12	Chavez (4–5)	**Milone** (1–2)	—	**Citi Field** (39,501)	18–24
43	May 23	Padres	9–3	**Harvey** (3–3)	Chacín (4–4)	—	**Citi Field** (24,337)	19–24
44	May 24	Padres	5–6	Buchter (3–2)	**Smoker** (0–2)	Hand (1)	**Citi Field** (23,933)	19–25
45	May 25	Padres	3–4	Lamet (1–0)	**Montero** (0–4)	Hand (2)	**Citi Field** (24,131)	19–26
46	May 26	@ Pirates	8–1	**deGrom** (4–1)	Kuhl (1–5)	—	PNC Park (29,408)	20–26
47	May 27	@ Pirates	4–5 (10)	Watson (3–1)	**Pill** (0–1)	—	PNC Park (31,658)	20–27
48	May 28	@ Pirates	7–2	**Harvey** (4–3)	Glasnow (2–4)	—	PNC Park (21,828)	21–27
49	May 29	Brewers	4–2	**Gsellman** (4–3)	Garza (2–2)	Reed (7)	**Citi Field** (34,830)	22–27
50	May 30	Brewers	5–4 (12)	**Smoker** (1–2)	Peralta (5–4)	—	**Citi Field** (24,457)	23–27
51	May 31	Brewers	1–7	Guerra (1–0)	**deGrom** (4–2)	—	**Citi Field** (26,517)	23–28

June: 14–14 (Home: 5–7; Away: 9–7)

#	Date	Opponent	Box Score	Win	Loss	Save	Location (Attendance)	Record
52	June 1	Brewers	1–2	Anderson (4–1)	**Wheeler** (3–3)	Knebel (4)	**Citi Field** (35,123)	23–29
53	June 2	Pirates	7–12	Cole (3–5)	**Sewald** (0–1)	—	**Citi Field** (33,047)	23–30
54	June 3	Pirates	4–2	**Gsellman** (4–3)	Glasnow (2–5)	**Reed** (8)	**Citi Field** (34,035)	24–30
55	June 4	Pirates	1–11	Williams (3–3)	**Pill** (0–2)	—	**Citi Field** (35,323)	24–31
56	June 6	@ Rangers	8–10	Bibens-Dirkx (1–0)	**deGrom** (4–3)	—	Globe Life Park in Arlington (32,617)	24–32
57	June 7	@ Rangers	4–3	**Blevins** (3–0)	Bush (2–1)	**Reed** (9)	Globe Life Park in Arlington (32,477)	25–32
58	June 9	@ Braves	2–3	Johnson (4–1)	**Salas** (0–2)	—	SunTrust Park (36,791)	25–33
59	June 10 (1)	@ Braves	6–1	**Gsellman** (5–3)	Newcomb (0–1)	**Reed** (10)	SunTrust Park (27,684)	26–33
60	June 10 (2)	@ Braves	8–1	**Matz** (1–0)	Wisler (0–1)	—	SunTrust Park (40,174)	27–33
61	June 11	@ Braves	2–1	**Lugo** (1–0)	García (2–5)	**Reed** (11)	SunTrust Park (30,638)	28–33
62	June 12	Cubs	6–1	**deGrom** (5–3)	Lackey (4–7)	—	**Citi Field** (33,268)	29–33
63	June 13	Cubs	3–14	Lester (4–4)	**Wheeler** (3–4)	—	**Citi Field** (32,651)	29–34
64	June 14	Cubs	9–4	**Blevins** (4–0)	Edwards Jr. (2–1)	—	**Citi Field** (34,566)	30–34
65	June 15	Nationals	3–8	Gonzalez (6–1)	**Gsellman** (5–4)	—	**Citi Field** (30,319)	30–35
66	June 16	Nationals	2–7	Scherzer (8–4)	**Matz** (1–1)	—	**Citi Field** (37,119)	30–36
67	June 17	Nationals	4–7	Strasburg (8–2)	**Lugo** (1–1)	Romero (2)	**Citi Field** (38,059)	30–37
68	June 18	Nationals	5–1	**deGrom** (6–3)	Ross (3–3)	—	**Citi Field** (40,459)	31–37
69	June 19	@ Dodgers	6–10	Kershaw (10–2)	**Wheeler** (3–5)	—	Dodger Stadium (43,266)	31–38
70	June 20	@ Dodgers	0–12	McCarthy (6–3)	**Gsellman** (5–5)	Stewart (1)	Dodger Stadium (47,715)	31–39
71	June 21	@ Dodgers	2–8	Hill (4–3)	**Pill** (0–3)	—	Dodger Stadium (42,330)	31–40
72	June 22	@ Dodgers	3–6	Báez (1–0)	**Sewald** (0–2)	Jansen (16)	Dodger Stadium (45,967)	31–41
73	June 23	@ Giants	11–4	**Lugo** (2–1)	Blach (4–5)	—	AT&T Park (41,769)	32–41
74	June 24	@ Giants	5–2	**deGrom** (7–3)	Dyson (0–1)	—	AT&T Park (41,216)	33–41
75	June 25	@ Giants	8–2	**Montero** (1–4)	Moore (3–8)	—	AT&T Park (41,137)	34–41
76	June 27	@ Marlins	3–6	Barraclough (4–1)	**Ramirez** (0–1)	Ramos (13)	Marlins Park (20,804)	34–42
77	June 28	@ Marlins	8–0	**Matz** (2–1)	Locke (0–4)	—	Marlins Park (18,743)	35–42
78	June 29	@ Marlins	6–3	**Lugo** (3–1)	Ureña (6–3)	**Reed** (12)	Marlins Park (21,350)	36–42
79	June 30	Phillies	2–1	**deGrom** (8–3)	Lively (1–3)	Addison Reed (13)	**Citi Field** (37,134)	37–42

July: 11–13 (Home: 7–5; Away: 4–8)

#	Date	Opponent	Box Score	Win	Loss	Save	Location (Attendance)	Record
80	July 1	Phillies	7–6	**Salas** (1–2)	Neshek (2–2)	**Reed** (14)	**Citi Field** (33,080)	38–42
81	July 2	Phillies	1–7	Pivetta (2–4)	**Montero** (1–5)	—	**Citi Field** (30,343)	38–43
82	July 3	@ Nationals	2–3	Albers (4–1)	**Sewald** (0–3)	—	Nationals Park (41,681)	38–44
83	July 4	@ Nationals	4–11	Ross (5–3)	**Lugo** (3–2)	—	Nationals Park (37,120)	38–45
	July 5	@ Nationals	Postponed (rain); Rescheduled for August 27 as part of a doubleheader				Nationals Park	
84	July 7	@ Cardinals	6–5	**deGrom** (9–3)	Martinez (6–8)	**Reed** (15)	Busch Stadium (43,849)	39–45
85	July 8	@ Cardinals	1–4	Wainwright (10–5)	**Wheeler** (3–6)	Oh (18)	Busch Stadium (44,013)	39–46
86	July 9	@ Cardinals	0–6	Lynn (7–6)	**Matz** (2–2)	—	Busch Stadium (42,925)	39–47
**All–Star Break (July 10–13)**
87	July 14	Rockies	14–2	**deGrom** (10–3)	Gray (2–1)	—	**Citi Field** (27,582)	40–47
88	July 15	Rockies	9–3	**Lugo** (4–2)	Chatwood (6–11)	—	**Citi Field** (34,783)	41–47
89	July 16	Rockies	4–13	Hoffman (6–1)	**Matz** (2–3)	—	**Citi Field** (28,745)	41–48
90	July 17	Cardinals	3–6	Wainwright (11–5)	**Wheeler** (3–7)	Cecil (1)	**Citi Field** (29,977)	41–49
91	July 18	Cardinals	0–5	Wacha (7–3)	**Montero** (1–6)	—	**Citi Field** (29,964)	41–50
92	July 19	Cardinals	7–3	**deGrom** (11–3)	Leake (6–8)	**Reed** (16)	**Citi Field** (32,228)	42–50
93	July 20	Cardinals	3–2	**Reed** (1–2)	Rosenthal (2–4)	—	**Citi Field** (39,640)	43–50
94	July 21	Athletics	7–5	**Robles** (5–1)	Blackburn (1–1)	**Blevins (1)**	**Citi Field** (26,969)	44–50
95	July 22	Athletics	6–5	**Robles** (6–1)	Castro (0–1)	—	**Citi Field** (39,629)	45–50
96	July 23	Athletics	2–3	Gossett (2–5)	**Montero** (1–7)	Casilla (16)	**Citi Field** (29,037)	45–51
97	July 24	@ Padres	5–3	**deGrom** (12–3)	Richard (5–11)	**Reed** (17)	Petco Park (23,325)	46–51
98	July 25	@ Padres	6–5	**Lugo** (5–2)	Torres (5–3)	**Reed** (18)	Petco Park (28,024)	47–51
99	July 26	@ Padres	3–6	Chacín (10–7)	**Matz** (2–4)	Hand (4)	Petco Park (19,281)	47–52
100	July 27	@ Padres	5–7	Perdomo (5–5)	**Flexen** (0–1)	Hand (5)	Petco Park (26,262)	47–53
101	July 28	@ Mariners	7–5	Blevins (5–0)	Phelps (2–5)	Reed (19)	Safeco Field (34,543)	48–53
102	July 29	@ Mariners	2–3	Gallardo (5–7)	**deGrom** (12–4)	Diaz (19)	Safeco Field (33,519)	48–54
103	July 30	@ Mariners	1–9	Paxton (11–3)	**Lugo** (5–3)	—	Safeco Field (31,162)	48–55

August: 10–20 (Home: 3–11; Away: 7–9)

#	Date	Opponent	Box Score	Win	Loss	Save	Location (Attendance)	Record
104	August 1	@ Rockies	4–5	Dunn (3–1)	**Robles** (6–2)	—	Coors Field (36,698)	48–56
105	August 2	@ Rockies	10–5	**Bradford** (1–0)	Chatwood (6–12)	—	Coors Field (36,945)	49–56
106	August 3	@ Rockies	4–5	Holland (2–1)	**Robles** (6–3)	—	Coors Field (35,276)	49–57
107	August 4	Dodgers	0–6	Darvish (1–0)	**deGrom** (12–5)	—	**Citi Field** (41,187)	49–58
108	August 5	Dodgers	4–7	Morrow (4–0)	**Sewald** (0–4)	—	**Citi Field** (40,060)	49–59
109	August 6	Dodgers	0–8	Ryu (4–6)	**Matz** (2–5)	—	**Citi Field** (27,077)	49–60
110	August 8	Rangers	5–4	**Flexen** (1–1)	Griffin (5–3)	**Ramos** (21)	**Citi Field** (37,326)	50–60
111	August 9	Rangers	1–5	Perez (6–10)	**Montero** (1–8)	—	**Citi Field** (34,222)	50–61
112	August 10	@ Phillies	10–0	**deGrom** (13–5)	Velasquez (2–7)	—	Citizens Bank Park (27,716)	51–61
113	August 11	@ Phillies	7–6	**Robles** (7–3)	Neris (4–5)	**Ramos** (22)	Citizens Bank Park (26,925)	52–61
114	August 12	@ Phillies	1–3	Nola (9–7)	**Matz** (2–6)	García (2)	Citizens Bank Park (34,131)	52–62
115	August 13	@ Phillies	6–2	**Flexen** (2–1)	Eflin (1–4)	—	Citizens Bank Park (24,106)	53–62
116	August 14	@ Yankees	2–4	Robertson (6–2)	**Robles** (7–4)	Betances (7)	Yankee Stadium (45,619)	53–63
117	August 15	@ Yankees	4–5	Gray (7–7)	**deGrom** (13–6)	Chapman (16)	Yankee Stadium (46,474)	53–64
118	August 16	Yankees	3–5	Kahnle (2–3)	**Sewald** (0–5)	Robertson (14)	**Citi Field** (42,260)	53–65
119	August 17	Yankees	5–7	Severino (10–5)	**Matz** (2–7)	Betances (8)	Citi Field (42,549)	53–66
120	August 18	Marlins	1–3	Nicolino (2–1)	**Flexen** (2–2)	Ziegler (5)	**Citi Field** (25,951)	53–67
121	August 19	Marlins	8–1	**Montero** (2–8)	Worley (2–3)	—	**Citi Field** (30,171)	54–67
122	August 20	Marlins	4–6	Conley (6–5)	**deGrom** (13–7)	Ziegler (6)	**Citi Field** (26,464)	54–68
123	August 21	Diamondbacks	2–3 (10)	Sherfy (1–0)	**Goeddel** (0–1)	Rodney (28)	**Citi Field** (24,265)	54–69
124	August 22	Diamondbacks	4–7	Corbin (11–11)	**Milone** (1–3)	Rodney (29)	**Citi Field** (25,220)	54–70
125	August 23	Diamondbacks	4–2	**Flexen** (3–2)	Godley (5–7)	**Ramos** (23)	**Citi Field** (31,277)	55–70
126	August 24	Diamondbacks	2–3	Ray (10–5)	**Montero** (2–9)	Rodney (30)	**Citi Field** (25,284)	55–71
127	August 25	@ Nationals	4–2	**deGrom** (14–7)	Cole (1–4)	**Ramos** (24)	Nationals Park (34,036)	56–71
128	August 26	@ Nationals	4–9	González (13–5)	**Gsellman** (5–6)	—	Nationals Park (36,761)	56–72
129	August 27 (1)	@ Nationals	6–5	**Blevins** (6–0)	Blanton (2–3)	**Ramos** (25)	Nationals Park (31,904)	57–72
130	August 27 (2)	@ Nationals	4–5	Roark (11–8)	**Robles** (7–5)	Doolittle (16)	Nationals Park (20,624)	57–73
131	August 29	@ Reds	4–14	Romano (4–5)	**Flexen** (3–3)	—	Great American Ball Park (12,946)	57–74
132	August 30	@ Reds	2–0	**Montero** (3–9)	Bailey (4–7)	**Ramos** (26)	Great American Ball Park (12,491)	58–74
133	August 31	@ Reds	2–7	Stephenson (3–4)	**deGrom** (14–8)	—	Great American Ball Park (13,634)	58–75

September/October: 12–17 (Home: 9–5; Away: 3–12)

#	Date	Opponent	Box Score	Win	Loss	Save	Location (Attendance)	Record
134	September 2	@ Astros	8–12	Morton (11–6)	**Harvey** (4–4)	—	Minute Maid Park (30,319)	58–76
135	September 2	@ Astros	1–4	Musgrove (7–8)	**Lugo** (5–4)	Giles (28)	Minute Maid Park (34,904)	58–77
136	September 3	@ Astros	6–8	Harris (3–2)	**Flexen** (3–4)	Devenski (4)	Minute Maid Park (32,065)	58–78
137	September 4	Phillies	11–7	**Montero** (4–9)	Leiter (2–5)	—	**Citi Field** (28,808)	59–78
138	September 5	Phillies	1–9	Lively (3–5)	**deGrom** (14–9)	—	**Citi Field** (22,230)	59–79
139	September 6	Phillies	6–3 (6)	**Gsellman** (6–6)	Pivetta (5–10)	—	**Citi Field** (19,617)	60–79
140	September 7	Reds	7–2	**Harvey** (5–4)	Mahle (0–2)	—	**Citi Field** (21,274)	61–79
141	September 8	Reds	5–1	**Lugo** (6–4)	Garrett (3–7)	**Ramos** (27)	**Citi Field** (25,864)	62–79
142	September 9	Reds	6–1	**Montero** (5–9)	Bailey (4–8)	—	**Citi Field** (30,661)	63–79
143	September 10	Reds	5–10	Stephens (2–0)	**Familia** (1–2)	Iglesias (26)	**Citi Field** (27,590)	63–80
144	September 12	@ Cubs	3–8	Quintana (10–11)	**Gsellman** (6–7)	—	Wrigley Field (37,834)	63–81
145	September 13	@ Cubs	5–17	Lester (11–7)	**Harvey** (5–5)	—	Wrigley Field (36,008)	63–82
146	September 14	@ Cubs	6–14	Duensing (1–1)	**Lugo** (6–5)	—	Wrigley Field (37,867)	63–83
147	September 15	@ Braves	2–3	Newcomb (3–8)	**Montero** (5–10)	Vizcaíno (11)	SunTrust Park (29,402)	63–84
148	September 16	@ Braves	7–3	**deGrom** (15–9)	Dickey (9–10)	—	SunTrust Park (37,846)	64–84
149	September 17	@ Braves	5–1	**Gsellman** (7–7)	Teherán (11–12)	—	SunTrust Park (32,785)	65–84
150	September 18	@ Marlins	1–13	Straily (10–9)	**Harvey** (5–6)	Worley (1)	Marlins Park (16,385)	65–85
151	September 19	@ Marlins	4–5 (10)	Barraclough (6–2)	**Sewald** (0–6)	—	Marlins Park (16,405)	65–86
152	September 20	@ Marlins	2–9	Ureňa (14–6)	**Montero** (5–11)	—	Marlins Park (16,033)	65–87
153	September 22	Nationals	7–6	**Bradford** (2–0)	Blanton (2–4)	**Familia** (4)	**Citi Field** (28,095)	66–87
154	September 23	Nationals	3–4 (10)	Solis (1–0)	**Rhame** (0–1)	Doolittle (23)	**Citi Field** (34,455)	66–88
155	September 24	Nationals	2–3	Scherzer (16–6)	**deGrom** (15–10)	Kintzler (29)	**Citi Field** (29,057)	66–89
156	September 25 (1)	Braves	2–9	Sims (3–5)	**Flexen** (3–5)	—	**Citi Field**	66–90
157	September 25 (2)	Braves	3–2	**Lugo** (7–5)	Fried (1–1)	**Familia** (5)	**Citi Field** (21,698)	67–90
158	September 26	Braves	4–3	**Familia** (2–2)	Minter (0–1)	—	**Citi Field** (21,938)	68–90
159	September 27	Braves	7–1	**Gsellman** (8–7)	Newcomb (4–9)	—	**Citi Field** (28,617)	69–90
160	September 29	@ Phillies	2–6	Lively (4–7)	**Harvey** (5–7)	—	Citizens Bank Park (19,375)	69–91
161	September 30	@ Phillies	7–4 (11)	**Rhame** (1–1)	Morgan (3–3)	**Familia** (6)	Citizens Bank Park (25,138)	70–91
162	October 1	@ Phillies	0–11	Pivetta (8–10)	**Flexen** (3–6)	—	Citizens Bank Park (25,754)	70–92

== Roster ==
2017 New York Mets
Roster
Pitchers: 39 Jerry Blevins; 46 Chasen Bradford; 43 Jamie Callahan; 48 Jacob deGrom; 66 Josh Edgin; 27 Jeurys Familia; 64 Chris Flexen; 36 Sean Gilmartin; 62 Erik Goeddel; 65 Robert Gsellman; 33 Matt Harvey; 67 Seth Lugo; 32 Steven Matz; 61 Kevin McGowan; 29 Tommy Milone; 50 Rafael Montero; 56 Tyler Pill; 55 Neil Ramirez; 40,44 A. J. Ramos; 43 Addison Reed; 35 Jacob Rhame; 47 Hansel Robles; 59 Fernando Salas; 51 Paul Sewald; 49 Josh Smoker; 34 Noah Syndergaard; 45 Zack Wheeler; 35 Adam Wilk	Catchers: 18 Travis d'Arnaud; 77 Tomas Nido; 26 Kevin Plawecki; 44 René Rivera; Infielders: 13 Asdrúbal Cabrera; 2 Gavin Cecchini; 21 Lucas Duda; 72 Phillip Evans; 4 Wilmer Flores; 7 José Reyes; 15 Matt Reynolds; 54 T.J. Rivera; 1 Amed Rosario; 22 Dominic Smith; 20 Neil Walker	Outfielders: 11 Norichika Aoki; 19 Jay Bruce; 52 Yoenis Céspedes; 30 Michael Conforto; 3 Curtis Granderson; 12 Juan Lagares; 9 Brandon Nimmo; 28 Travis Taijeron; Other batters: 56 Ty Kelly	Manager: 10 Terry Collins; Coaches: 25 Ricky Bones (bullpen); 22,88 Tom Goodwin (first base); 78 Eric Langill (bullpen catcher); 57 Kevin Long (hitting); 53 Dave Racaniello (bullpen catcher); 6 Pat Roessler (assistant hitting); 23 Dick Scott (bench); 53 Glenn Sherlock (third base); 38 Dan Warthen (pitching)

== Statistics ==
=== Batting ===
Players in bold are on the active MLB roster as of 2022. (Updated through 10/1/17)

Note: G = Games played; AB = At bats; R = Runs; H = Hits; 2B = Doubles; 3B = Triples; HR = Home runs; RBI = Runs batted in; BB = Walks; SO = Strikeouts; AVG = Batting average; OBP = On-base percentage; SLG = Slugging percentage; SB = Stolen bases

Player	G	AB	R	H	2B	3B	HR	RBI	BB	SO	AVG	OBP	SLG	SB
Norichika Aoki	27	102	16	29	7	1	0	8	13	10	.284	.371	.373	5
Jay Bruce	103	406	61	104	20	0	29	75	39	102	.256	.321	.520	0
Asdrubal Cabrera	135	479	66	134	32	0	14	59	50	83	.280	.351	.434	3
Gavin Cecchini	32	77	4	16	2	0	1	7	4	19	.208	.256	.273	0
Yoenis Cespedes	81	291	46	85	17	2	17	42	26	61	.292	.352	.540	0
Michael Conforto	109	373	72	104	20	1	27	68	57	113	.279	.384	.555	2
**Travis d'Arnaud**	112	348	39	85	19	1	16	57	23	59	.244	.293	.443	0
Lucas Duda	75	252	30	62	21	0	17	37	37	73	.246	.347	.532	0
Phillip Evans	19	33	4	10	2	0	0	1	4	8	.303	.395	.364	0
**Wilmer Flores**	110	336	42	91	17	1	18	52	17	54	.271	.307	.488	1
Curtis Granderson	111	337	58	77	22	3	19	52	53	90	.228	.334	.481	4
Ty Kelly	1	1	0	0	0	0	0	0	0	1	.000	.000	.000	0
**Juan Lagares**	94	252	37	63	16	2	3	15	14	56	.250	.296	.365	7
**Tomas Nido**	5	10	0	3	1	0	0	3	0	2	.300	.300	.400	0
**Brandon Nimmo**	69	177	26	46	11	1	5	21	31	60	.260	.379	.418	2
**Kevin Plawecki**	37	100	11	26	5	0	3	13	14	17	.260	.304	.400	1
José Reyes	145	501	75	123	25	7	15	58	50	79	.246	.315	.413	24
**Matt Reynolds**	68	113	12	26	1	2	1	5	14	37	.230	.326	.301	0
René Rivera	54	174	15	40	4	0	8	23	9	54	.230	.278	.391	0
T.J. Rivera	73	214	27	62	13	1	5	27	9	32	.290	.330	.430	1
**Amed Rosario**	46	165	16	41	4	4	4	10	3	49	.248	.271	.394	7
**Dominic Smith**	49	167	17	33	6	0	9	26	14	49	.198	.262	.395	0
Travis Taijeron	26	52	3	9	2	0	1	3	5	24	.173	.271	.269	0
Neil Walker	73	265	40	70	13	2	10	36	27	47	.264	.339	.442	0
Pitcher totals	162	285	18	40	6	0	2	15	14	112	.140	.180	.182	1
**Team totals**	**162**	**5510**	**735**	**1379**	**286**	**28**	**224**	**713**	**529**	**1291**	**.250**	**.320**	**.434**	**58**

=== Pitching ===
(Updated thru 10/1/17)

Players in bold are on the active MLB roster as of 2022.

Note: W = Wins; L = Losses; ERA = Earned run average; G = Games pitched; GS = Games started; SV = Saves; IP = Innings pitched; H = Hits allowed; R = Runs allowed; ER = Earned runs allowed; HR = Home runs allowed; BB = Walks allowed; K = Strikeouts

Player	W	L	ERA	G	GS	SV	IP	H	R	ER	HR	BB	K
Jerry Blevins	6	0	2.94	75	0	1	49.0	43	16	16	4	24	69
Chasen Bradford	2	0	3.74	28	0	0	33.2	30	17	14	3	13	27
Jamie Callahan	0	0	4.05	9	0	0	6.2	7	4	3	0	1	5
**Jacob deGrom**	15	10	3.53	31	31	0	201.1	180	87	79	28	59	239
Josh Edgin	0	1	3.65	46	0	1	37.0	39	16	15	3	18	27
**Jeurys Familia**	2	2	4.38	26	0	6	24.2	21	14	12	1	15	25
**Chris Flexen**	3	6	7.88	14	9	0	48.0	62	44	42	11	35	36
Sean Gilmartin	0	0	13.50	2	0	0	3.1	8	5	5	2	1	4
Erik Goeddel	0	1	5.28	33	0	0	29.0	28	17	17	8	11	33
**Robert Gsellman**	8	7	5.19	25	22	0	119.2	138	85	69	17	42	82
Matt Harvey	5	7	6.70	19	18	0	92.2	110	70	69	21	47	67
**Seth Lugo**	7	5	4.71	19	18	0	101.1	114	57	53	13	25	85
**Steven Matz**	2	7	6.08	13	13	0	66.2	83	46	45	12	19	48
Kevin McGowan	0	0	5.19	8	0	0	8.2	8	5	5	2	6	8
**Tommy Milone**	0	3	8.56	11	5	0	27.1	36	28	26	9	12	22
**Rafael Montero**	5	11	5.52	34	18	0	119.0	141	75	73	12	67	114
Tyler Pill	0	3	5.32	7	3	0	22.0	22	16	13	3	10	16
**Kevin Plawecki**	0	0	12.00	2	0	0	3.0	5	4	4	3	0	0
Neil Ramírez	0	1	6.43	20	0	0	21.0	20	15	15	4	17	26
A.J. Ramos	0	0	4.74	21	0	7	19.0	19	10	10	3	12	25
Addison Reed	1	2	2.57	43	0	19	49.0	49	14	14	6	6	48
Jacob Rhame	1	1	9.00	9	0	0	9.0	12	9	9	2	7	7
**Hansel Robles**	7	5	4.92	46	0	0	56.2	47	31	31	10	29	60
Fernando Salas	1	2	6.00	48	0	0	45.0	60	35	30	7	20	47
**Paul Sewald**	0	6	4.55	57	0	0	65.1	58	36	33	8	21	69
Josh Smoker	1	2	5.11	54	0	0	56.1	64	34	32	10	32	68
**Noah Syndergaard**	1	2	2.97	7	7	0	30.1	29	14	10	0	3	34
**Zach Wheeler**	3	7	5.21	17	17	0	86.1	97	53	50	15	40	81
Adam Wilk	0	1	12.27	1	1	0	3.2	8	6	5	3	1	2
**Team totals**	**70**	**92**	**5.01**	**162**	**162**	**34**	**1434.2**	**1538**	**863**	**799**	**220**	**593**	**1374**

== Farm system ==
Level	Team	League	Manager
AAA	Las Vegas 51s	Pacific Coast League	Pedro López
AA	Binghamton Rumble Ponies	Eastern League	Luis Rojas
A-Advanced	St. Lucie Mets	Florida State League	Chad Kreuter
A	Columbia Fireflies	South Atlantic League	José Leger
A-Short Season	Brooklyn Cyclones	New York–Penn League	Edgardo Alfonzo
Rookie	Kingsport Mets	Appalachian League	Luis Rivera
Rookie	GCL Mets	Gulf Coast League	José Carreño
Rookie	DSL Mets 1	Dominican Summer League	Manny Martinez
Rookie	DSL Mets 2	Dominican Summer League	David Davalillo
