= Seth Lugo =

American baseball player (born 1989)

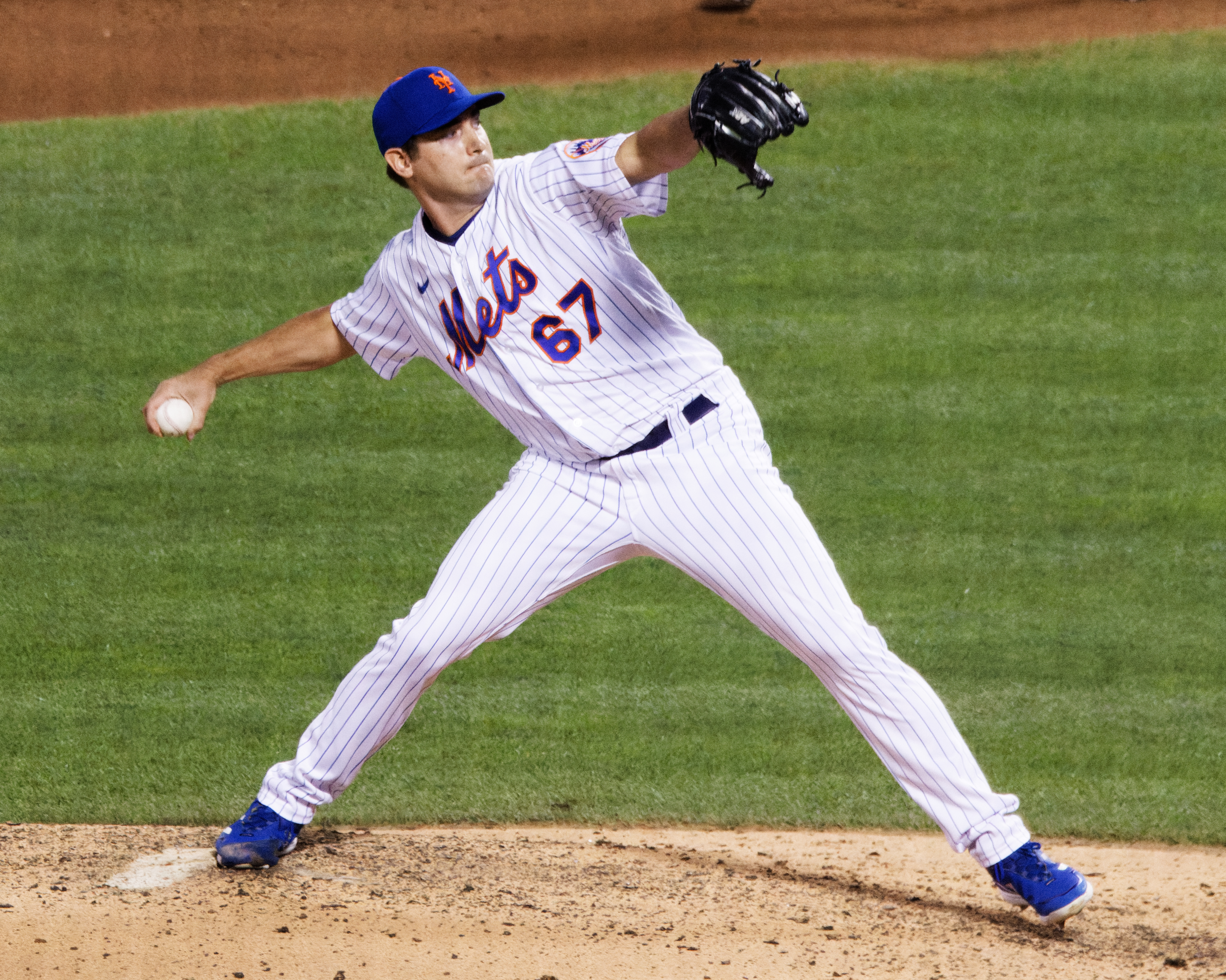
- Lugo with the New York Mets in 2022

Kansas City Royals – No. 67
- Pitcher
- Born: November 17, 1989 (age 37); Shreveport, Louisiana, U.S.
- Bats: Right Throws: Right

MLB debut
- July 1, 2016, for the New York Mets

MLB statistics (through 2026 season)
- Win–loss record: 71–56
- Earned run average: 3.74
- Strikeouts: 1,088
- Stats at Baseball Reference

Teams
- New York Mets (2016–2022); San Diego Padres (2023); Kansas City Royals (2024–present)

Career highlights and awards
- All-Star (2024); Gold Glove Award (2024); Pitched a combined no-hitter on April 29, 2022
Medals
Men's baseball
Representing Puerto Rico
World Baseball Classic
Silver medal – second place	2017 Los Angeles	Team

Jacob Seth Lugo (born November 17, 1989) is an American professional baseball pitcher for the Kansas City Royals of Major League Baseball (MLB). He has previously played in MLB for the New York Mets and San Diego Padres. He made his MLB debut in 2016. Lugo played for the Puerto Rican national baseball team in the 2017 World Baseball Classic and the 2026 World Baseball Classic, winning a silver medal in the former.

== Career ==
=== Amateur career ===
Lugo attended Parkway High School in Bossier City, Louisiana, and Centenary College of Louisiana, where he played college baseball for the Centenary Gentlemen. In three seasons with Centenary, Lugo had a 5.31 earned run average (ERA).

=== New York Mets ===
==== Minor leagues ====
The New York Mets selected him in the 34th round, with the 1,032nd overall selection, of the 2011 MLB draft. He signed with the Mets, receiving a $20,000 signing bonus.

Lugo missed the 2012 season due to spondylolisthesis, which required spinal fusion surgery. After the procedure he was bedridden at his mother's home for three months. Lugo returned to pitch in 2013 for the Brooklyn Cyclones of the Low-A New York–Penn League and the Savannah Sand Gnats of the Single-A South Atlantic League, pitching to a 4–6 win–loss record with a 3.39 ERA in 12 games started. He pitched for the St. Lucie Mets of the High-A Florida State League in 2014, and for the Binghamton Mets of the Double-A Eastern League and Las Vegas 51s of the Triple-A Pacific Coast League in 2015. The Mets added him to their 40-man roster after the 2015 season.

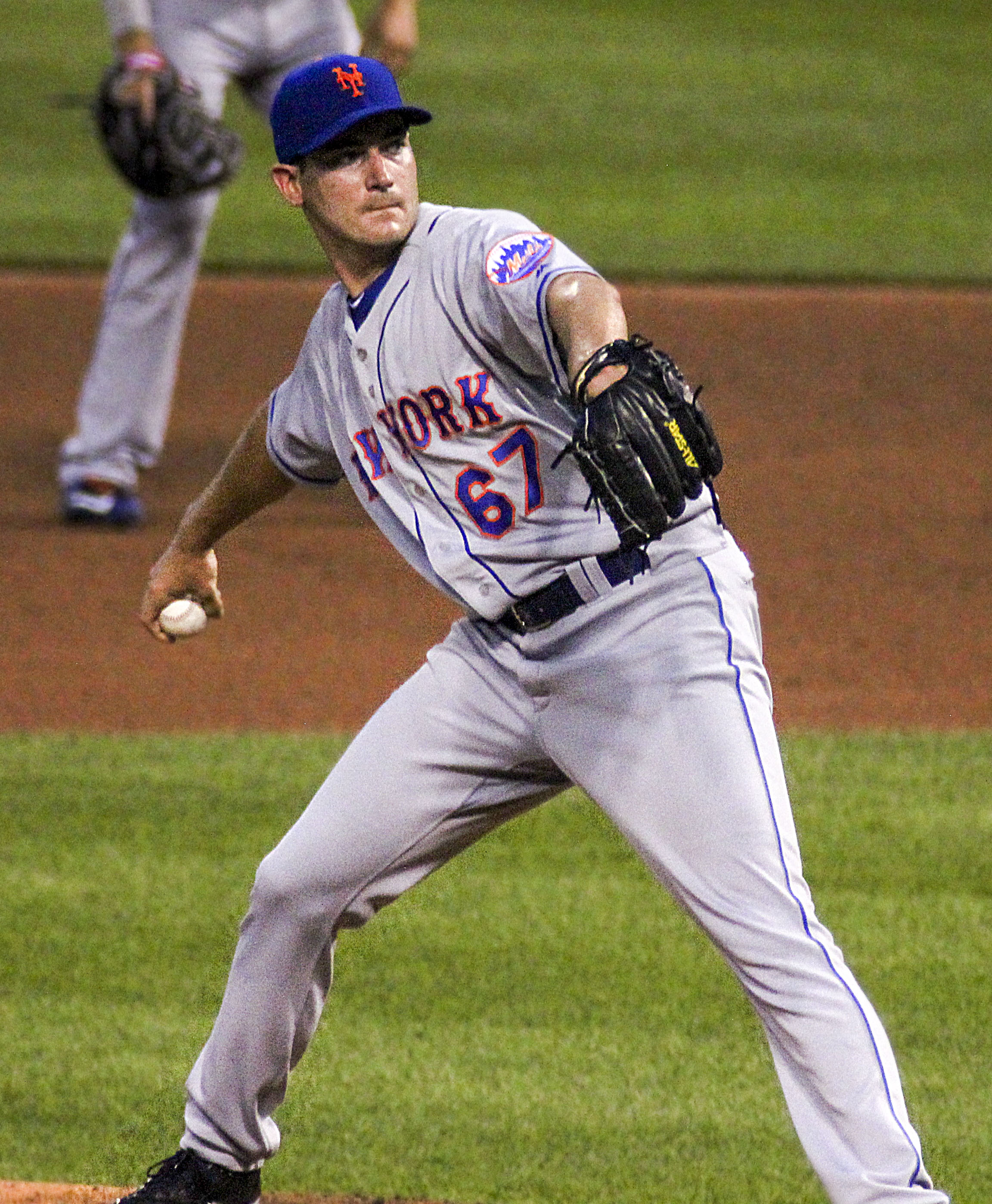
Lugo with the Mets in 2016

Lugo began the 2016 season with Triple-A Las Vegas.

==== Major leagues ====
The Mets promoted Lugo to the major leagues on June 30. Lugo made his Major League debut against the Chicago Cubs on July 1, 2016, throwing two shutout innings in a victory. On August 25, Lugo recorded his first major league win and hit, throwing five shutout innings against the St. Louis Cardinals at Busch Stadium before exiting with muscle cramps. Following that, Lugo became a key cog in the Mets' injury-riddled rotation, pitching to a 2.67 ERA throughout the season and finishing with a 5–2 record. Lugo would have been the second or third starter for New York in the postseason had the Mets advanced past the Wild-Card Game.

Entering the 2017 season, Lugo was expected to provide depth the Mets' pitching staff. After injuries to other starters, Lugo found himself battling with Robert Gsellman for the final spot in the Opening Day starting rotation. However, Lugo himself was diagnosed with a partial tear of the ulnar collateral ligament in his pitching arm after competing for Puerto Rico in the 2017 World Baseball Classic. The injury caused him to miss the first two months of the regular season. He returned to make his first start of the season for the Mets on June 11, 2017, against the Atlanta Braves, getting the win after pitching seven innings of one-run ball. On Saturday July 15, 2017, Lugo hit his first major league home run against the Colorado Rockies. On August 15, Lugo was again placed on the disabled list with an impingement in his pitching shoulder. He returned on August 27, pitching 3 2/3 innings with 5 strikeouts in a pitch-limited start. He continued making shorter starts throughout September, finishing the season with a 7-5 record and an ERA of 4.71, with 85 strikeouts and 25 walks over 101 1/3 innings pitched.

Lugo performed very well the following season, posting a 2.66 ERA and 103 strikeouts in 54 games. He was once again effective in 2019, his first season in which he was exclusively a relief pitcher, posting a 2.70 ERA while striking out 104 batters and walking only 16 in 80 innings. Lugo struggled during the 2020 season, registering a 5.15 ERA and 3-4 record with 47 strikeouts in 36.2 innings of work.

On May 17, 2021, Lugo was placed on the 60-day injured list after undergoing right elbow surgery. He was activated on May 31.

On April 29, 2022, Lugo pitched in relief in a combined no-hitter against the Philadelphia Phillies, recording the last two outs of the top of the 8th inning.

=== San Diego Padres ===
On December 22, 2022, Lugo signed a one-year, $15 million contract with the San Diego Padres, containing a player option for the 2024 season. He made 26 starts for San Diego during the 2023 season, posting an 8-7 record and 3.57 ERA with 140 strikeouts across 146 1/3 innings pitched. On November 2, 2023, Lugo declined his player option and became a free agent.

=== Kansas City Royals ===
On December 14, 2023, Lugo signed a three-year, $45 million contract with the Kansas City Royals. In 2024, he was named to the All-Star team after having a stellar first half of the season in which he led the MLB in innings pitched (122), tied for the MLB lead in wins (11), and led all qualified American League pitchers in ERA (2.21). On July 21, 2024, Lugo threw his first career complete game; in 9 innings, he struck out 6 batters and allowed 3 hits, no walks, and one earned run in a 4-1 win over the Chicago White Sox. He finished 2nd in American League Cy Young Award balloting. On July 27, 2025, Lugo signed a two-year extension with the Royals that began in 2026 with a vesting, performance-based option for 2028, worth a guaranteed $46 million. Lugo received $20 million each in 2026 and 2027 with a $3 million signing bonus. The vesting option was worth $20 million featuring a club option for $17 million with a $3 million buyout.

In 2026, opponents batted .295 against Lugo, the highest for any pitcher in MLB of that year. His other stats for that year featured a 7–9 record and a 5.17 ERA in 32 starts.

== International career ==
Lugo chose to honor his paternal grandfather, who was Puerto Rican, by playing for the Puerto Rican national baseball team in the 2017 World Baseball Classic. He was the starting pitcher against Venezuela in the first round and against United States in both the second round and the Championship Game. He won both the first and second-round games. In the Championship Game, Lugo did not have the same luck on the mound as Puerto Rico lost, 8–0. In 2026, he returned to play for Puerto Rico in the 2026 World Baseball Classic.

Awards and achievements
Preceded by Corbin Burnes; Josh Hader	No-hitter pitcher April 29, 2022 (with Tylor Megill, Drew Smith, Joely Rodríguez & Edwin Díaz)	Succeeded by Reid Detmers
