= Gerson Bautista =

Dominican baseball player (born 1995)

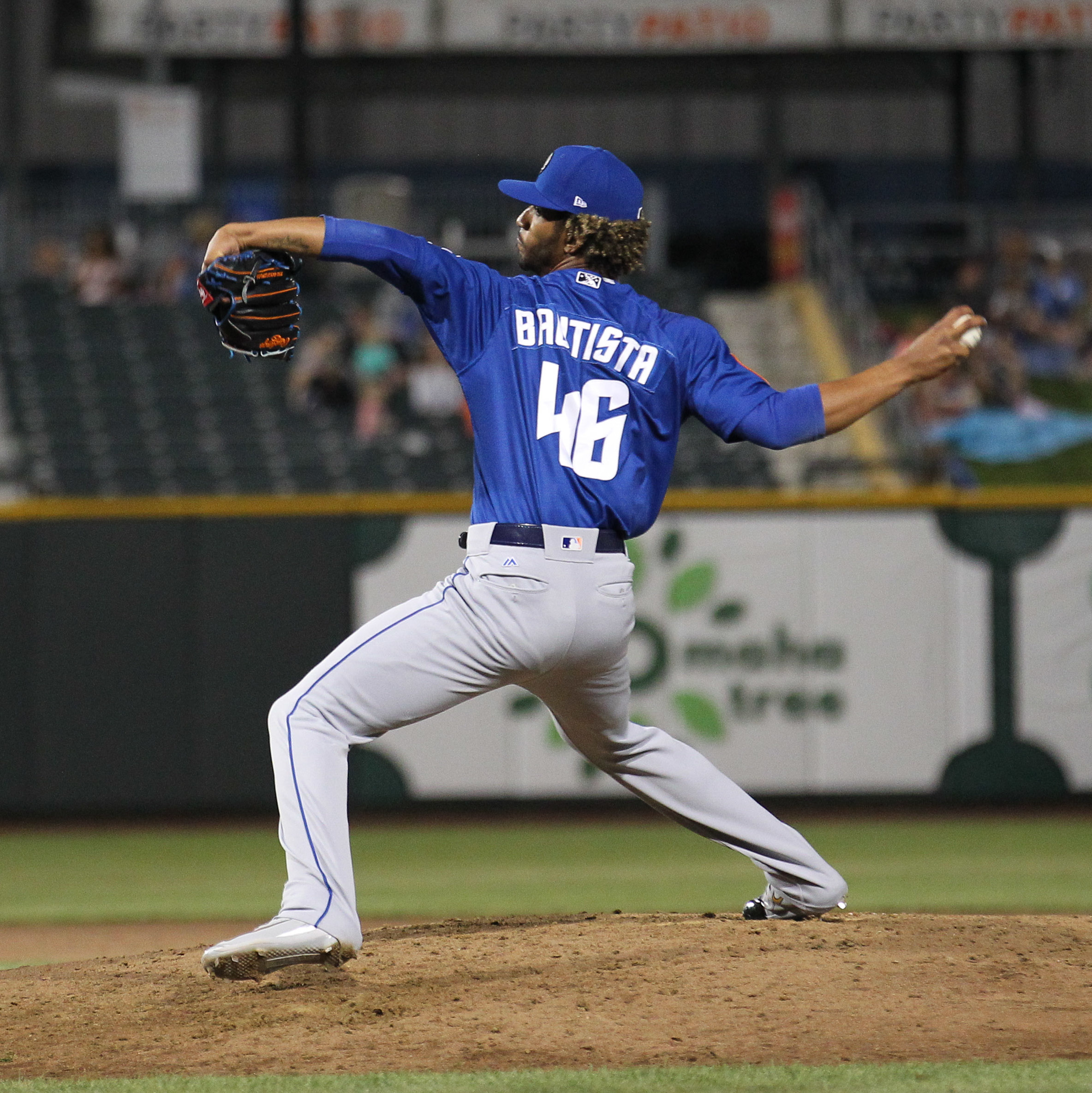
- Bautista pitching for the Las Vegas 51s in 2018

Free agent
- Pitcher
- Born: May 31, 1995 (age 31); San Juan, Dominican Republic
- Bats: Right Throws: Right

MLB debut
- April 17, 2018, for the New York Mets

MLB statistics (through 2019 season)
- Win–loss record: 0–2
- Earned run average: 11.48
- Strikeouts: 10
- Stats at Baseball Reference

Teams
- New York Mets (2018); Seattle Mariners (2019)

Gerson Bautista (born May 31, 1995) is a Dominican professional baseball pitcher who is a free agent. He has previously played in Major League Baseball (MLB) for the New York Mets and Seattle Mariners. He made his MLB debut in 2018.

== Career ==
=== Boston Red Sox ===
Bautista signed with the Boston Red Sox as an international free agent in April 2013. He made his professional debut with the Dominican Summer League Red Sox in 2014 and spent the whole season there, posting a 2–1 record and 1.03 ERA in 13 games (12 starts). He spent 2015 with the Gulf Coast League Red Sox where he was 3–3 with a 2.77 ERA in 12 games (11 starts), and 2016 with the Lowell Spinners and Greenville Drive, posting a combined 1–4 record, 2.55 ERA, and 1.08 WHIP in 23 total appearances out of the bullpen between the two teams. Bautista began 2017 with the Salem Red Sox.

=== New York Mets ===
On July 31, 2017, the Red Sox traded him along with Jamie Callahan and Stephen Nogosek to the New York Mets for Addison Reed. New York assigned him to the St. Lucie Mets and he finished the season there. In 37 total relief appearances between Salem and St. Lucie, he was 3–3 with a 4.22 ERA and 73 strikeouts in 59.2 innings. The Mets added him to their 40-man roster after the 2017 season.

Bautista started 2018 with the Binghamton Rumble Ponies before being promoted to the Las Vegas 51s. He was recalled by the Mets and made his Major League debut on April 17, 2018.

=== Seattle Mariners ===
On December 3, 2018, the Mets traded Bautista, Jay Bruce, Jarred Kelenic, Anthony Swarzak, and Justin Dunn to the Seattle Mariners for Edwin Díaz, Robinson Canó, and $20 million. He appeared in 8 games for Seattle in 2019, struggling to an 11.00 ERA with 7 strikeouts over 9 innings pitched.

Bautista did not appear for Seattle in 2020, and did not pitch in the minor leagues due to the cancellation of the minor league season because of the COVID-19 pandemic. On October 23, 2020, Bautista was removed from the 40–man roster and sent outright to the Triple–A Tacoma Rainiers. He became a free agent on November 2.

On November 5, 2020, Bautista re-signed with the Mariners on a minor league contract. He was released prior to the start of the season on March 22, 2021.

=== Diablos Rojos del México ===
On April 22, 2021, Bautista signed with the Diablos Rojos del México of the Mexican League. In 22 appearances out of the bullpen, Bautista posted a 1.99 ERA and 27 strikeouts over 22 2/3 innings.

=== San Francisco Giants ===
On July 19, 2021, Bautista's contract was purchased by the San Francisco Giants organization and he was assigned to the Triple-A Sacramento River Cats. Bautista made 9 appearances for Sacramento, going 1–3 with an ERA of 9.00 and striking out 10. On August 29, Bautista was released by the Giants.

=== Diablos Rojos del México (second stint) ===
On February 10, 2022, Bautista re-signed with the Diablos Rojos del México. He struggled immensely to a 38.57 ERA with 2 strikeouts in 2 1/3 innings pitched.

=== Mariachis de Guadalajara ===
On May 2, 2022, Bautista was traded to the Mariachis de Guadalajara. In 5 appearances, he posted an 0–2 record with a 22.85 ERA and 3 strikeouts. Bautista was released on May 14.

=== Toros de Tijuana ===
On May 2, 2023, Bautista signed with the Toros de Tijuana. On May 18, Bautista was fined and suspended by the league for 10 games. The suspension came after Bautista was ejected in a game against the Rieleros de Aguascalientes when a foreign substance was discovered on his glove. In 22 relief appearances, he posted a 1–1 record with a 3.48 ERA and 23 strikeouts over 20 2/3 innings. Bautista was released on June 26.

=== Sultanes de Monterrey ===
On August 1, 2023, Bautista signed with the Sultanes de Monterrey of the Mexican League. He made two appearances for Monterrey and didn't allow a run while striking out one batter in two innings of work.

=== Conspiradores de Querétaro ===
On April 10, 2024, Bautista signed with the Conspiradores de Querétaro of the Mexican League. In 39 appearances for Querétaro, he compiled a 4–3 record and 7.39 ERA with 30 strikeouts and 3 saves across 35 1/3 innings pitched. Bautista was released by the Conspiradores on February 18, 2025.
