= Aarom Baldiris =

Venezuelan baseball player (born 1983)

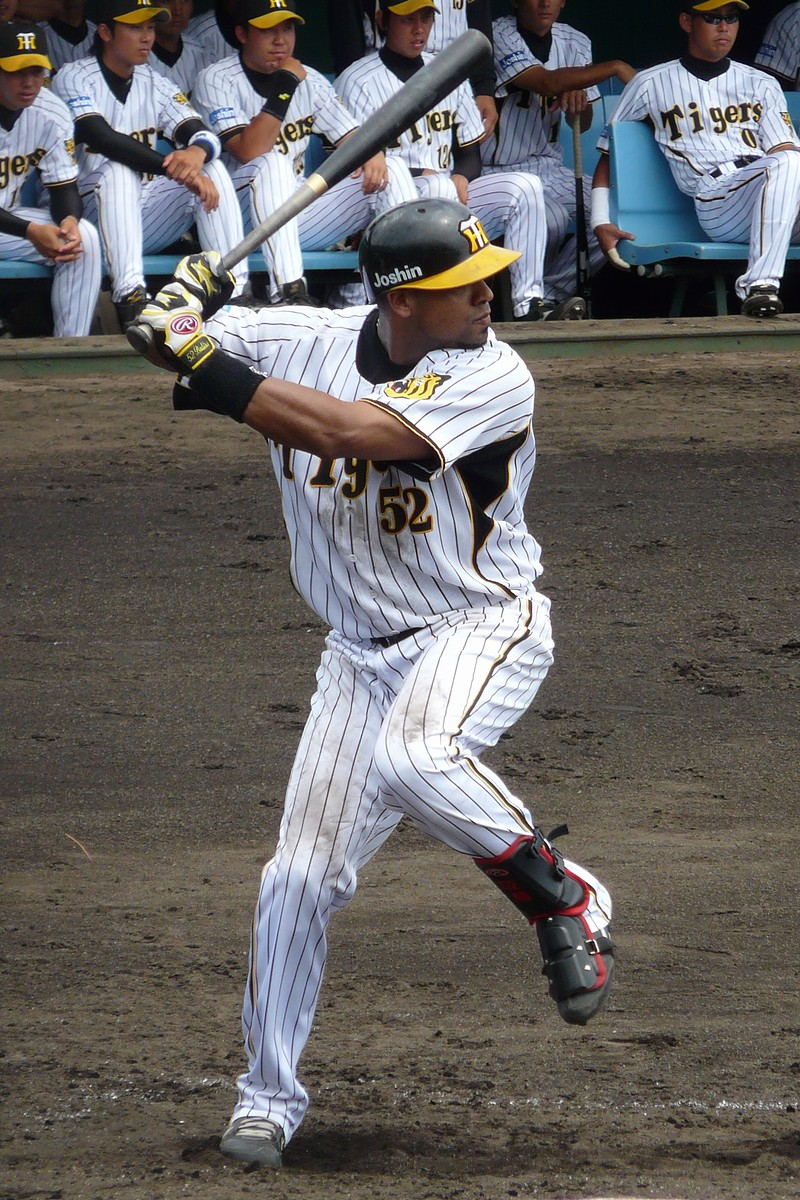
- Baldiris with the Hanshin Tigers
- Third baseman
- Born: January 5, 1983 (age 43); Caracas, Venezuela
- Batted: Right Threw: Right

Professional debut
- NPB: May 15, 2008, for the Hanshin Tigers
- KBO: April 1, 2016, for the Samsung Lions

Last appearance
- NPB: October 3, 2015, for the Yokohama DeNA BayStars
- KBO: August 5, 2016, for the Samsung Lions

NPB statistics
- Batting average: .268
- Home runs: 93
- Runs batted in: 387

KBO statistics
- Batting average: .266
- Home runs: 8
- Runs batted in: 33
- Stats at Baseball Reference

Teams
- Hanshin Tigers (2008–2009); Orix Buffaloes (2010–2013); Yokohama DeNA BayStars (2014–2015); Samsung Lions (2016)

Aarom German Baldiris Pérez (born January 5, 1983) is a Venezuelan former professional baseball third baseman. He played in Nippon Professional Baseball (NPB) for the Hanshin Tigers, Orix Buffaloes, and Yokohama DeNA BayStars, and in the KBO League for the Samsung Lions. He batted and threw right-handed.

== Career ==
=== Minor league career ===
Bardiris was originally drafted by the New York Mets out of high school at the age of seventeen. He started off at the Rookie-Class Venezuelan Summer League and played there until 2002, and missed the entire 2001 season due to an injury. He was called up to Single-A Brooklyn in 2002, then to Double-A Binghamton in 2004. He played for the Texas Rangers organization in 2006. He was acquired by the New York Yankees in 2007 and put on their 40-man roster in September 2007.

=== Career in Japan ===
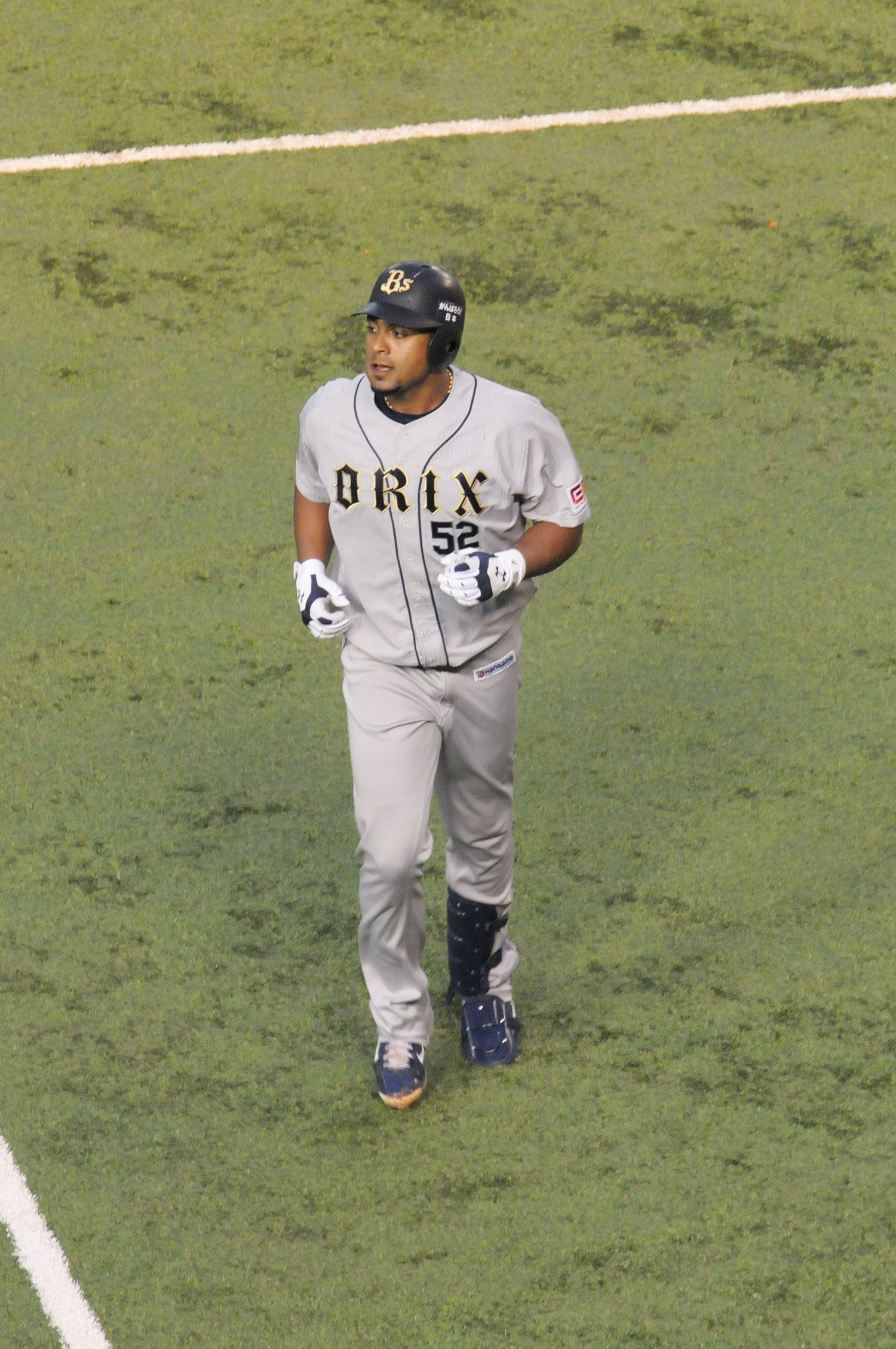
Baldiris with the Orix Buffaloes

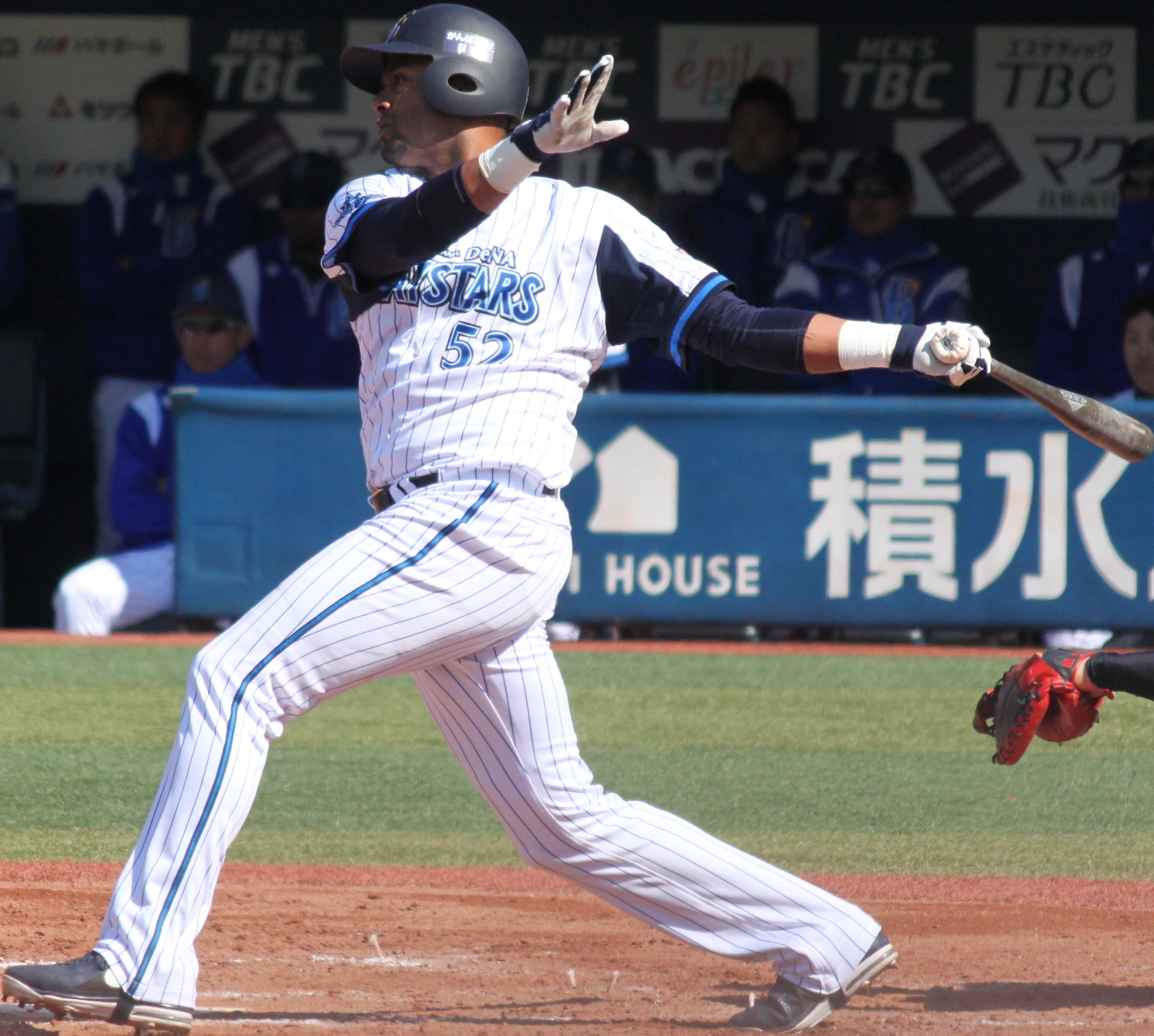
Baldiris with the Yokohama DeNA BayStars

Baldiris left the Yankees and signed to play in NPB in 2008. There, the Hanshin Tigers selected him to be on the team's #1 roster. He struggled the first couple of weeks, but as the season went on, his batting average rose. On July 5, 2009 in a game against the Yakult Swallows, Baldiris hit his first NPB Home Run. It was a lead off home run off Masanori Ishikawa. He would later be chosen as one of the "Heroes" of that game along with the Tigers starting pitcher, Yasutomo Kubo. From 2010 to 2013 Baldris played for the Orix Buffaloes.

=== Samsung Lions ===
In 2016, Baldiris played for the Samsung Lions of the KBO League.

== Coaching career ==
On June 2, 2024, Baldiris was added to the coaching staff of the Toros de Tijuana of the Mexican League. He was removed from the staff on December 4.
