= Stephen Nogosek =

American baseball player (born 1995)

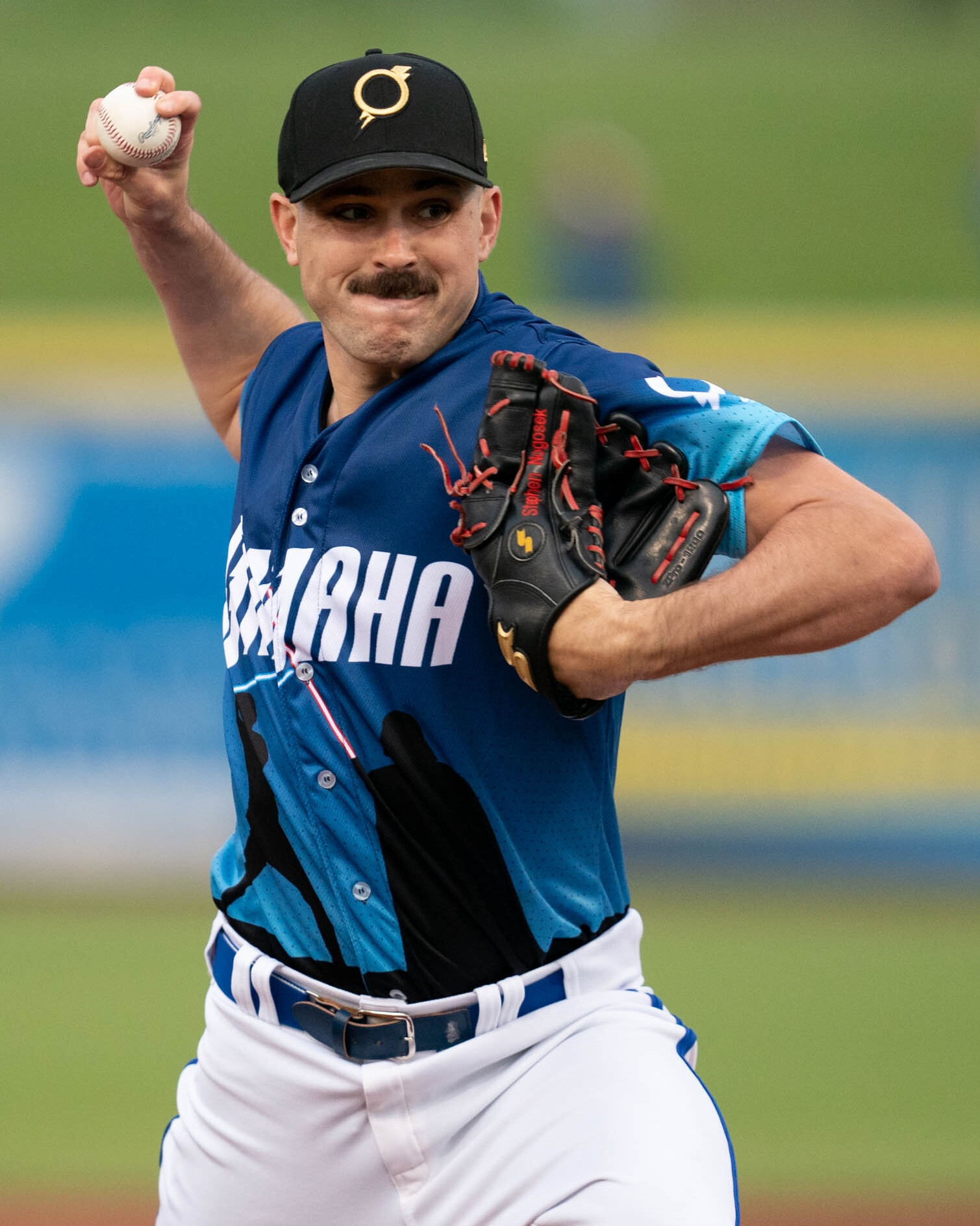
- Nogosek with the Omaha Storm Chasers in 2025

Seattle Mariners
- Pitcher
- Born: January 11, 1995 (age 31); Roseville, California, U.S.
- Bats: Right Throws: Right

MLB debut
- June 19, 2019, for the New York Mets

MLB statistics (through 2023 season)
- Win–loss record: 1–4
- Earned run average: 5.02
- Strikeouts: 57
- Stats at Baseball Reference

Teams
- New York Mets (2019, 2021–2023)

Stephen James Nogosek (born January 11, 1995) is an American professional baseball pitcher in the Seattle Mariners organization. He has previously played in Major League Baseball (MLB) for the New York Mets.

== Amateur career ==
Nogosek attended Woodcreek High School in Roseville, California, where he played baseball and football. As a junior for the baseball team in 2012, he pitched to an 8–0 record with a 1.02 ERA, striking out 100 batters in 75 2/3 innings pitched. After going undrafted out of high school in the 2013 MLB draft, he enrolled at the University of Oregon where he played college baseball for the Oregon Ducks. In 2014, as a freshman, Nogosek made 17 appearances (two starts), going 1–1 with a 2.52 ERA and a 1.37 WHIP. As a sophomore in 2015, he appeared in 39 games out of the bullpen in which he compiled a 6–3 record with a 2.02 ERA and a 1.24 WHIP. In 2015, he played collegiate summer baseball with the Orleans Firebirds of the Cape Cod Baseball League. In 2016, as a junior, he went 2–2 with a 1.11 ERA, a 0.96 WHIP, and 16 saves in 29 relief appearances and was named to the Pac-12 All-Conference Team.

== Professional career ==
=== Boston Red Sox ===
After Nogosek's junior year, he was drafted by the Boston Red Sox in the sixth round of the 2016 MLB draft. Nogosek signed with Boston for $250,000 and made his professional debut with the Lowell Spinners before being promoted to the Greenville Drive. In twenty relief appearances between the two clubs, he went 1–2 with a 3.62 ERA. He began 2017 back with Greenville, where he was named a South Atlantic League All-Star, and was promoted to the Salem Red Sox in June.

=== New York Mets ===
On July 31, 2017, the Red Sox traded Nogosek, Jamie Callahan, and Gerson Bautista to the New York Mets in exchange for Addison Reed. He was assigned to the St. Lucie Mets and finished the year there. In 69 relief innings pitched between Greenville, Salem, and St. Lucie, he compiled a 5–5 record with a 3.52 ERA and 78 strikeouts. Nogosek began 2018 with St. Lucie (where he was named to the Florida State League All-Star Game) and was promoted to the Binghamton Rumble Ponies in June. In 39 total appearances in relief between St. Lucie and Binghamton, Nogosek went 1–1 with a 4.99 ERA and a 1.47 WHIP. After the season, he was assigned to the Scottsdale Scorpions of the Arizona Fall League.

He returned to Binghamton to begin 2019 before being promoted to the Syracuse Mets. After going 2–0 with a 0.57 ERA in 19 relief appearances between Binghamton and Syracuse, his contract was purchased on June 18 and he was called up to the major leagues. He made his major league debut on June 19 for the Mets against the Atlanta Braves, pitching 2/3 of an inning and giving up two earned runs. On December 16, 2019, the Mets designated Nogosek for assignment.

Nogosek did not play in a game in 2020 due to the cancellation of the minor league season because of the COVID-19 pandemic. He was assigned to Triple-A Syracuse to begin the 2021 season. On July 19, 2021, Nogosek was selected to the active roster. He made only one appearance for New York in 2021, spending the remainder of the season in the minor leagues. On November 30, Nogosek was non-tendered by the Mets, making him a free agent.

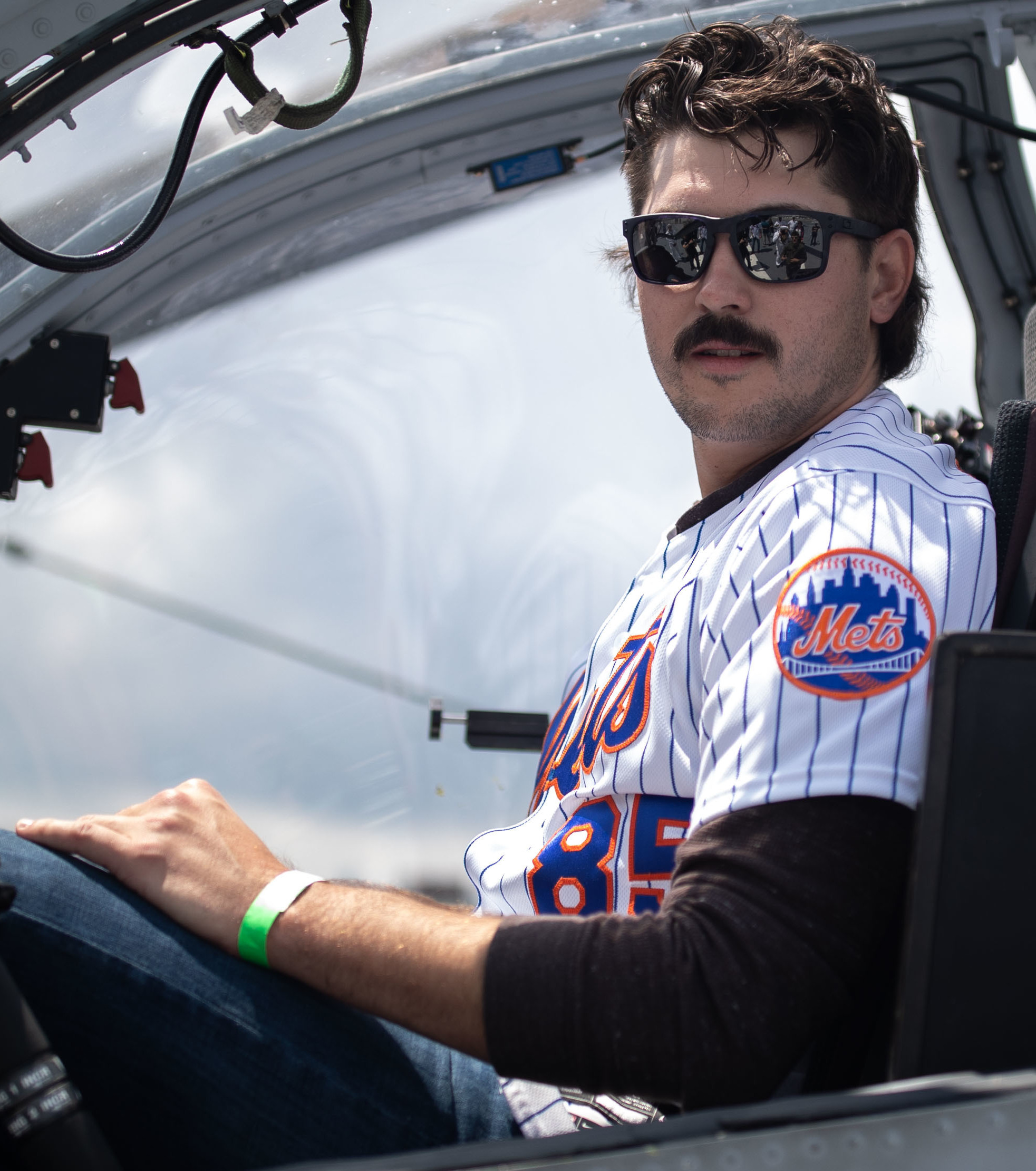
Nogosek with the New York Mets in 2022

On January 13, 2022, Nogosek re-signed with the Mets on a minor league contract. On May 8, Nogosek was selected to the 40–man and active rosters. On October 4, Nogosek recorded his first career win after tossing 2 2/3 scoreless innings of relief in the second game of a doubleheader against the Washington Nationals. In 12 appearances out of the bullpen, he posted a 2.45 ERA with 21 strikeouts in 22.0 innings of work.

In 2023, Nogosek pitched in 13 games for New York, registering a 5.61 ERA with 25 strikeouts in 25 2/3 innings pitched. On June 9, 2023, he was designated for assignment by the Mets. He cleared waivers and was sent outright to Triple–A Syracuse on June 13. However, Nogosek declined the outright assignment and elected free agency the following day.

=== Arizona Diamondbacks ===
On June 16, 2023, Nogosek signed a minor league contract with the Arizona Diamondbacks organization. In 27 games for the Triple–A Reno Aces, he struggled to a 6.55 ERA with 32 strikeouts across 33.0 innings of work. Nogosek elected free agency following the season on November 6.

=== Washington Nationals ===
On February 6, 2024, Nogosek signed a minor league contract with the Washington Nationals. In 11 games for the Triple–A Rochester Red Wings, he struggled to a 9.77 ERA with 15 strikeouts across 15 2/3 innings pitched. Nogosek was released by the Nationals organization on May 24.

=== Lancaster Stormers ===
On May 31, 2024, Nogosek signed with the Lancaster Stormers of the Atlantic League of Professional Baseball. In 33 appearances for Lancaster, he posted a 1–1 record and 4.32 ERA with 43 strikeouts and 13 saves across 33 1/3 innings of work. Nogosek became a free agent following the season.

=== Diablos Rojos del México ===
On February 1, 2025, Nogosek signed with the Diablos Rojos del México of the Mexican League. In 10 appearances for the team, Nogosek compiled an 0-1 record and 6.00 ERA with 13 strikeouts and three saves across nine innings pitched.

=== Kansas City Royals ===
On May 7, 2025, Nogosek signed a minor league contract with the Kansas City Royals. He made 41 appearances (five starts) for the Triple-A Omaha Storm Chasers, compiling a 3-3 record and 4.87 ERA with 60 strikeouts and two saves across 57 1/3 innings pitched. Nogosek elected free agency following the season on November 6.

Nogosek spent the 2025–26 offseason playing for the Leones del Escogido of the Dominican Professional Baseball League.

=== Diablos Rojos del México (second stint) ===
In March 2026, Nogosek temporarily rejoined the Diablos Rojos del México during the 2026 Baseball Champions League Americas. On April 14, 2026, he officially signed with the club. Nogosek made 46 appearances (including two starts) for México, compiling an 8–1 record and 3.69 ERA with 63 strikeouts across 53 2/3 innings pitched.

=== Seattle Mariners ===
On November 17, 2026, Nogosek signed a minor league contract with the Seattle Mariners.
