= Jo Soo-haeng =

South Korean baseball player (born 1993)

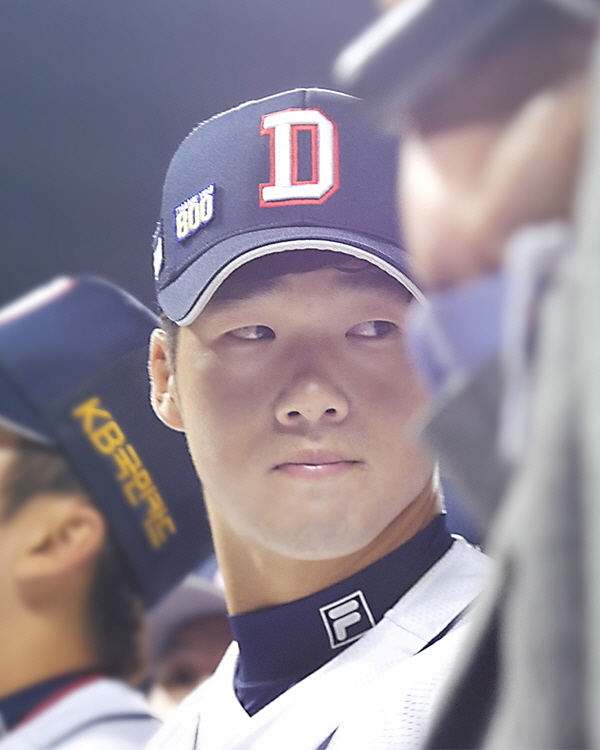

Doosan Bears – No. 51
- Outfielder
- Born: 30 August 1993 (age 32); Gangneung, South Korea
- Bats: Left Throws: Right

KBO debut
- April 1, 2016, for the Doosan Bears

KBO statistics (through 2024 season)
- Batting average: .257
- Home runs: 4
- Runs batted in: 90
- Stats at Baseball Reference

Teams
- Doosan Bears (2016–2018, 2020–present)

Jo Soo-haeng (Korean: 조수행; born 30 August 1993) is a South Korean professional baseball outfielder for the Doosan Bears of the KBO League. He graduated from Konkuk University and was selected to Doosan Bears by a draft in 2016 (2nd draft, 1st round). In 2018, he changed back number from No.9 to No.51.
