= Brett Pill =

American baseball player (born 1984)

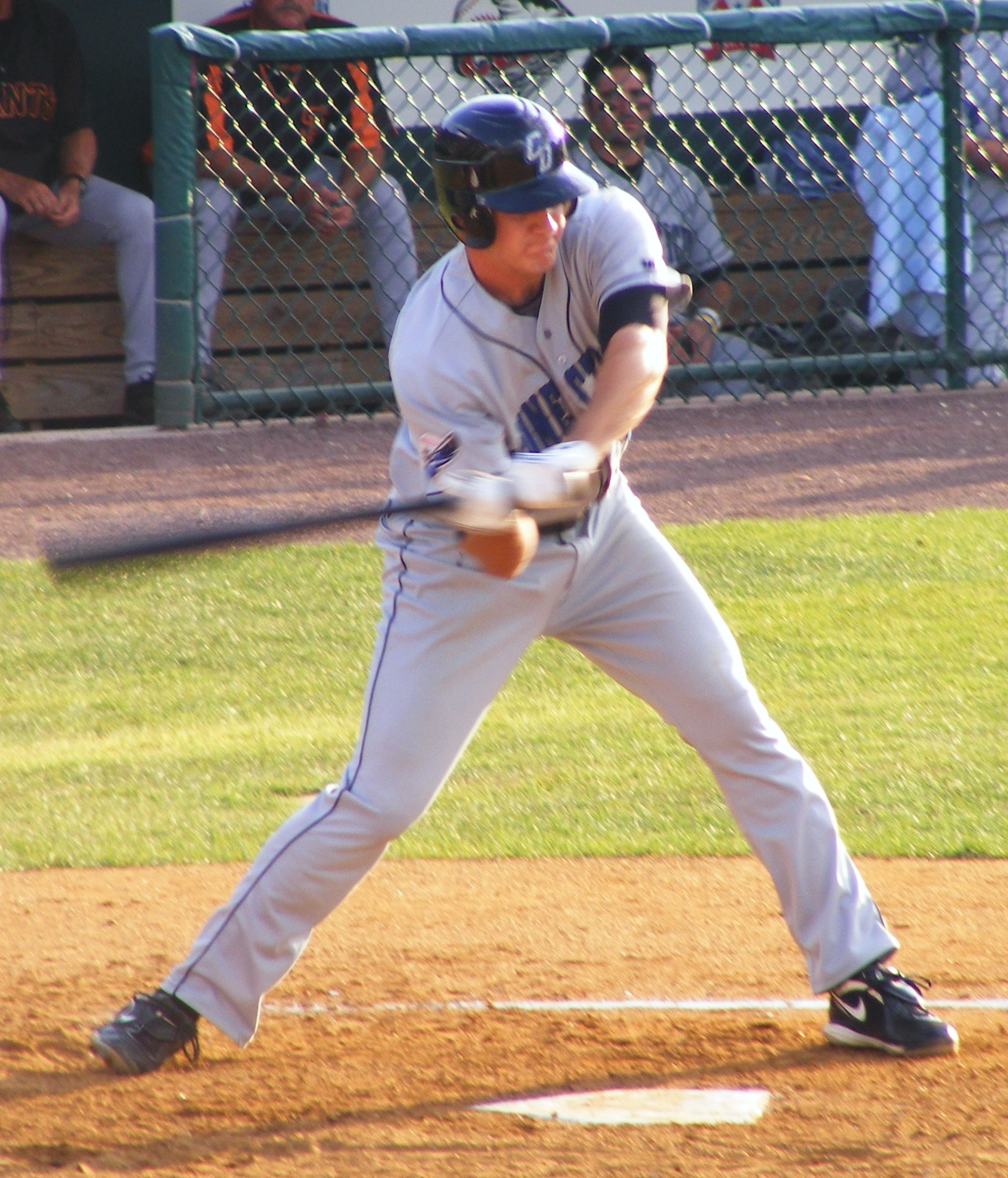
- Pill batting for Connecticut in 2009

Colorado Rockies – No. 72
- First baseman / Left fielder / Coach
- Born: September 9, 1984 (age 42); San Dimas, California, U.S.
- Batted: Right Threw: Right

Professional debut
- MLB: September 6, 2011, for the San Francisco Giants
- KBO: March 30, 2014, for the Kia Tigers

Last appearance
- MLB: September 28, 2013, for the San Francisco Giants
- KBO: October 8, 2016, for the Kia Tigers

MLB statistics
- Batting average: .233
- Home runs: 9
- Runs batted in: 32

KBO statistics
- Batting average: .316
- Home runs: 61
- Runs batted in: 253
- Stats at Baseball Reference

Teams
- As player: San Francisco Giants (2011–2013); Kia Tigers (2014–2016); As coach: Colorado Rockies (2026–present)

Brett Michael Pill (born September 9, 1984) is an American former professional baseball first baseman and left fielder who currently serves as the hitting coach for the Colorado Rockies of Major League Baseball (MLB). He played in MLB for the San Francisco Giants, and in the KBO League for the Kia Tigers.

== Amateur career ==
Pill attended Covina High School and California State University, Fullerton, where he played for the Cal State Fullerton Titans baseball team. As a freshman in 2004, he played in 50 games but had only 80 at-bats, hitting .313 with two home runs and 17 RBI. In 2005 he hit .327 with nine home runs and 57 RBI for the Titans, and played collegiate summer baseball for the Orleans Cardinals of the Cape Cod Baseball League. In his junior year, Pill hit .328 with five home runs and 40 RBI.

== Professional career ==
=== Draft and minor leagues ===
Pill was drafted twice. In 2005, he was drafted in the 45th round (1,362nd overall) by the New York Yankees, however he did not sign. He was drafted in the seventh round (206th overall) of the 2006 amateur draft by the Giants, and he did sign.

Pill began his professional career in 2006, playing for the Salem-Keizer Volcanoes. That season, he hit .220 with five home runs and 35 RBI in 60 games. In 2007, he played for the Augusta Greenjackets, hitting .269 with ten home runs and 91 RBI in 137 games. With the San Jose Giants in 2008, Pill hit .266 with nine home runs and 65 RBI in 131 games. He hit .298 with 19 home runs and 109 RBI in 139 games for the Connecticut Defenders in 2009. In 2010 and 2011, Pill played with the Fresno Grizzlies, the AAA affiliate of the Giants, hitting .294 and amassing 41 HR and 191 RBI over the course of two seasons. Prior to being promoted to the major leagues, on August 21, 2011, he led the Pacific Coast League with 101 RBI.

=== San Francisco Giants ===
Pill was promoted to the majors on August 31, 2011. He hit a home run in his first Major League at-bat on September 6, 2011, off Wade LeBlanc of the San Diego Padres, becoming the first Giant since Will Clark to accomplish that feat. On September 7, 2011, he joined John Bowker as the only Giant to hit a home run in his first two major league games; Pill is only the 22nd major league player to do so since 1919. He hit .300 with two home runs and nine RBI in 15 games with the Giants that year. After beginning the 2012 season with the Giants, on June 9, 2012, Pill was optioned to Triple-A's Fresno Grizzlies. In 2012, hit .210 with four home runs and 11 RBI in 105 at-bats for the Giants and .285 with 11 home runs and 45 RBI in 246 at-bats for the Grizzlies.

Pill was optioned to Triple-A to begin the 2013 season. The Giants recalled Pill from the Fresno Grizzlies on May 13, 2013, but he was sent back to AAA on June 13 after seeing only limited duty. On July 30, 2013, the Giants again recalled Pill, along with rookie Roger Kieschnick.

=== Kia Tigers ===
The Giants released Pill on January 2, 2014, so he could sign with the Kia Tigers of the Korea Baseball Organization. He played in 92 games in 2014 and recorded a .309 batting average, with 19 home runs and 66 runs batted in. Pill signed another one-year deal, worth $700,000, with the Tigers on December 8, 2014. In 2015, he hit .325 with 22 home runs and 101 RBIs in 143 games played. In November 2015, the Tigers re-signed Pill to a 1-year, $900,000 deal. He became a free agent at the end of the 2016 season.

=== Detroit Tigers ===
On January 10, 2017, Pill signed a minor league contract with the Detroit Tigers that included an invitation to spring training. He retired on March 31, 2017.

== Coaching career ==
=== Los Angeles Dodgers ===
In 2020, Pill was named the hitting coach for the Tulsa Drillers, the Double–A affiliate of the Los Angeles Dodgers.

=== Colorado Rockies ===
On December 12, 2025, Pill was hired to serve as the hitting coach for the Colorado Rockies.

== Personal life ==
Pill's brother is MLB pitcher Tyler Pill.

His father, Michael Pill, played three minor league seasons with the Pittsburgh Pirates from 1977 to 1979.
