= Travis Taijeron =

American baseball player (born 1989)

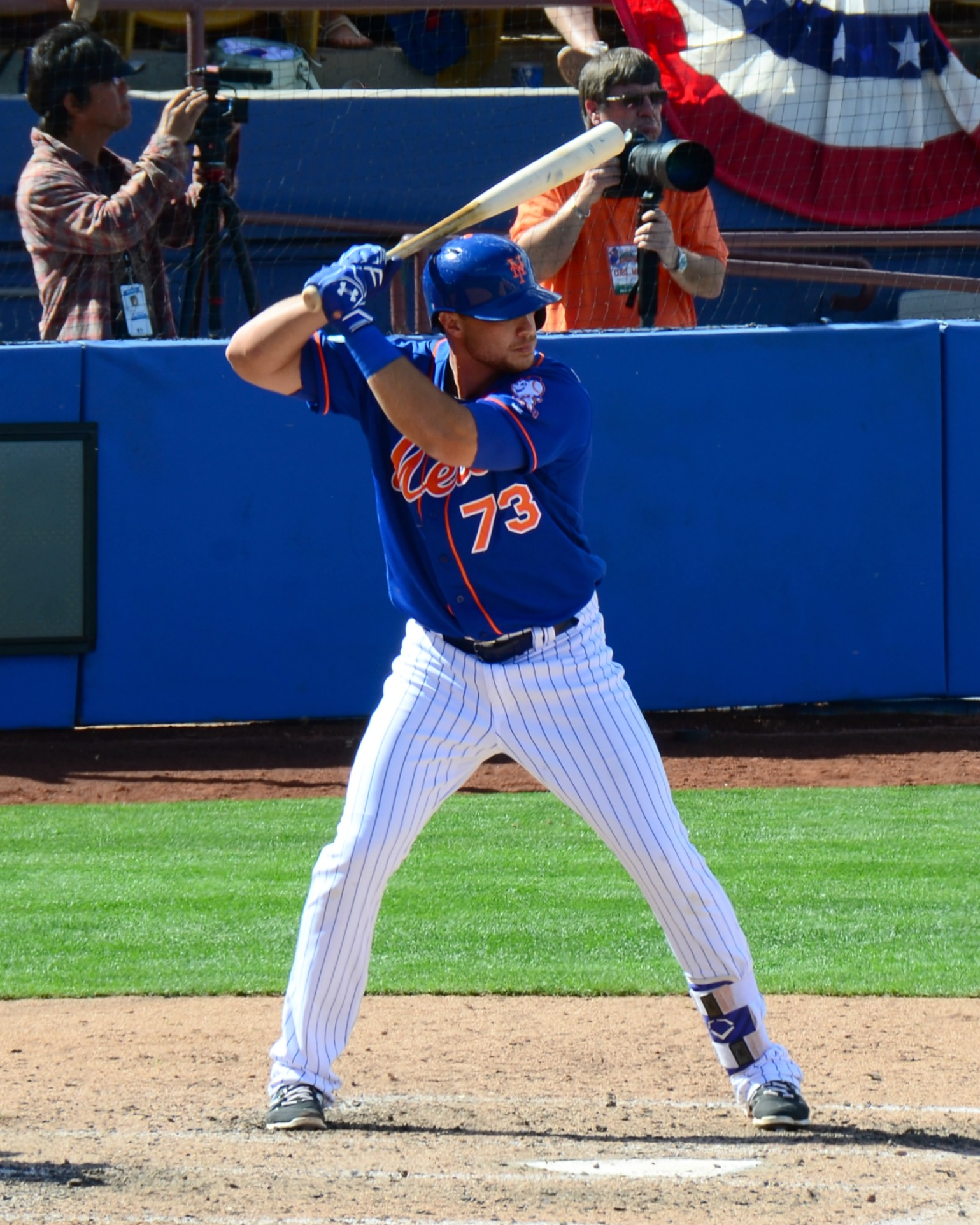
- Taijeron with the New York Mets
- Outfielder
- Born: January 20, 1989 (age 37); La Mesa, California, U.S.
- Batted: Right Threw: Right

MLB debut
- August 26, 2017, for the New York Mets

Last MLB appearance
- October 1, 2017, for the New York Mets

MLB statistics
- Batting average: .173
- Home runs: 1
- Runs batted in: 3
- Stats at Baseball Reference

Teams
- New York Mets (2017)

Travis Nathaniel Taijeron (born January 20, 1989) is an American former professional baseball outfielder. He played in Major League Baseball (MLB) for the New York Mets.

== Career ==
He was born in La Mesa, California and attended Granite Hills High School, where he was a catcher. Before playing professionally, he attended Grossmont College in 2008, where he spent a year and played for their baseball team. In 32 games, he posted a slash line of .382/.472/.563. He transferred to Southwestern College in 2009 and hit .353/.453/.601 in 42 games. For 2010, he transferred to Cal Poly Pomona, hitting .345/.441/.670 with 16 home runs and 48 RBI in 52 games. He played 59 games in 2011 and hit .392/.534/.744 with 16 home runs and 51 RBI. He earned numerous honors, including the 2010–11 California Collegiate Athletic Association Male Athlete of the Year, 2011 CCAA Most Valuable Player and Daktronics American Baseball Coaches Association/Rawlings and National Collegiate Baseball Writers Association West Region Player of the Year and an NCAA Division II All-American selection by Daktronics, the NCBWA and the ABCA.

=== New York Mets ===
The New York Mets drafted him in the 18th round of the 2011 Major League Baseball draft and assigned him to the Brooklyn Cyclones of the Low-A New York-Penn League. In 56 games, he hit .299/.387/.557 with nine home runs and 44 RBI. He earned his first Player of the Week honor that season, was named a MiLB.com Organization All-Star and was a New York–Penn League Mid-Season All-Star. He hit .255/.362/.477 with 19 home runs and 65 RBI in 112 games split between the Single-A Savannah Sand Gnats and High-A St. Lucie Mets in 2012, won another Player of the Week and was a South Atlantic League Mid-Season All-Star. In 2013, he hit .271/.356/.531 with 38 doubles, 23 home runs, 69 RBI and 131 strikeouts in 120 games split between St. Lucie and the Double-A Binghamton Mets. He was a Player of the Week twice and was again a MiLB.com Organization All-Star. With Binghamton in 2014, he hit .248/.357/.476 with 15 home runs and 64 RBI in 101 games and earned another Player of the Week selection. He began 2015 with Las Vegas, his first stay at Triple-A. In his first 15 games, he hit .352/.419/.667.

He is projected to be, at minimum, a fourth outfielder and a power bat off the bench with the potential to be an effective starting outfielder with 20-home run power. He has been listed on numerous Mets top prospect lists.

He was called up to the Major Leagues for the first time on August 26, 2017, when fellow outfielder Yoenis Céspedes landed on the disabled list. He made his Major League debut that day against the Washington Nationals at Nationals Park. He recorded his first hit on August 31 against Robert Stephenson of the Cincinnati Reds at Great American Ballpark. On September 27, Taijeron hit a ninth inning walk-off single against A. J. Minter of the Atlanta Braves at Citi Field. On October 25, Taijeron was removed from the 40-man roster and sent outright to Las Vegas. He elected free agency following the season on November 6.

=== Los Angeles Dodgers ===
Taijeron signed a minor league contract with the Los Angeles Dodgers on November 20, 2017. He played in 87 games for the Triple–A Oklahoma City Dodgers, hitting .269 with 11 homers and 44 RBI. Taijeron elected free agency following the season on November 2, 2018.

=== New York Mets (second stint) ===
On March 16, 2019, Taijeron signed a minor league contract with the New York Mets and was assigned to Triple–A Syracuse Mets. In 123 games for the Triple–A Syracuse Mets, he batted .229/.364/.496 with 24 home runs and 70 RBI. Taijeron became a free agent following the season on November 4.

Taijeron re-signed with the Mets organization on a new minor league contract March 13, 2020. He did not play in a game in 2020 due to the cancellation of the minor league season because of the COVID-19 pandemic. Taijeron was released by the Mets organization on May 28.
