= Tyler Pill =

American baseball player (born 1990)

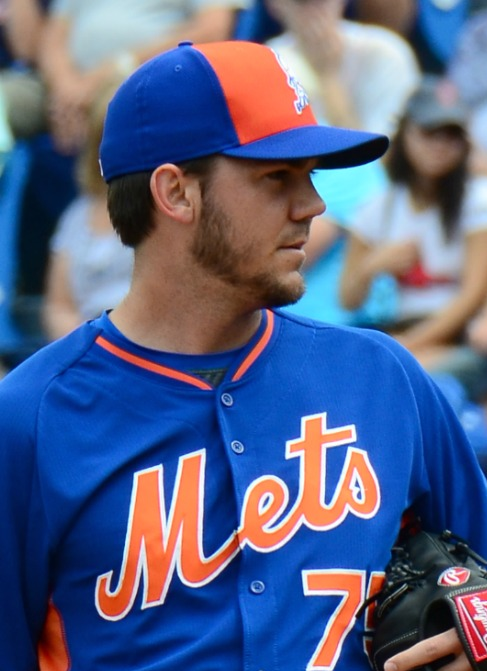
- Pill with the Mets in 2015
- Pitcher
- Born: May 29, 1990 (age 36); San Dimas, California, U.S.
- Batted: Left Threw: Right

MLB debut
- May 27, 2017, for the New York Mets

Last MLB appearance
- July 27, 2017, for the New York Mets

MLB statistics
- Win–loss record: 0–3
- Earned run average: 5.32
- Strikeouts: 16
- Stats at Baseball Reference

Teams
- New York Mets (2017)

Tyler Stephen Pill (born May 29, 1990) is an American former professional baseball pitcher and outfielder. He played in Major League Baseball (MLB) for the New York Mets.

== Career ==
=== Amateur ===
Pill was drafted by the Colorado Rockies in the 38th round of the 2008 Major League Baseball draft from Covina High School in Covina, California, and the New York Mets in the 4th round of the 2011 Major League Baseball draft from California State University, Fullerton in Fullerton, California.

Over three seasons with the Cal State Fullerton Titans, Pill pitched and played the outfield, had a 3.19 earned run average, 1.06 WHIP, 5.13 strikeout to walk ratio, .336 batting average, .421 on-base percentage and .488 slugging percentage. Collegiate Baseball, Baseball America and the National Collegiate Baseball Writers Association all named him to Freshman All-American teams after he set his school's freshman records in wins and shutouts. He and teammate Noe Ramirez were named co-Big West Conference Freshman Pitcher of the Year. Fullerton had a .724 winning percentage in Pill's time with the program and won the Big West Conference title twice in three seasons.

In 2010, he played collegiate summer baseball with the Harwich Mariners of the Cape Cod Baseball League.

=== New York Mets ===
On May 26, 2017, the Mets demoted Rafael Montero to the Triple–A Las Vegas 51s and promoted Pill to take his spot on the roster. He made his Major League debut in the tenth inning of the following night's game against the Pittsburgh Pirates at PNC Park, getting two outs but giving up a single, a hit batsman, and a walk and taking the loss. Pill made his first Major League start on May 30, against the Milwaukee Brewers at Citi Field; he allowed one run over 5 1/3 innings. On August 24, it was announced he would be shut down for the season after undergoing an arthroscopic debridement of his right elbow. On October 25, Pill was removed from the 40-man roster and sent outright to Las Vegas 51s. He elected free agency on November 6.

=== Arizona Diamondbacks ===
On January 15, 2018, Pill was signed to a minor league contract by the Arizona Diamondbacks organization. He made two appearances for the Triple-A Reno Aces, but struggled to a 15.75 ERA with three strikeouts over four innings of work.

=== Los Angeles Dodgers ===
On April 21, 2018, Pill was traded to the Los Angeles Dodgers in exchange for cash considerations. The Dodgers assigned him to the Triple–A Oklahoma City Dodgers, where he made 19 appearances (13 starts) and finished the season with a 3–5 record and 4.76 ERA. Pill elected free agency following the season on November 2.

=== Texas Rangers ===
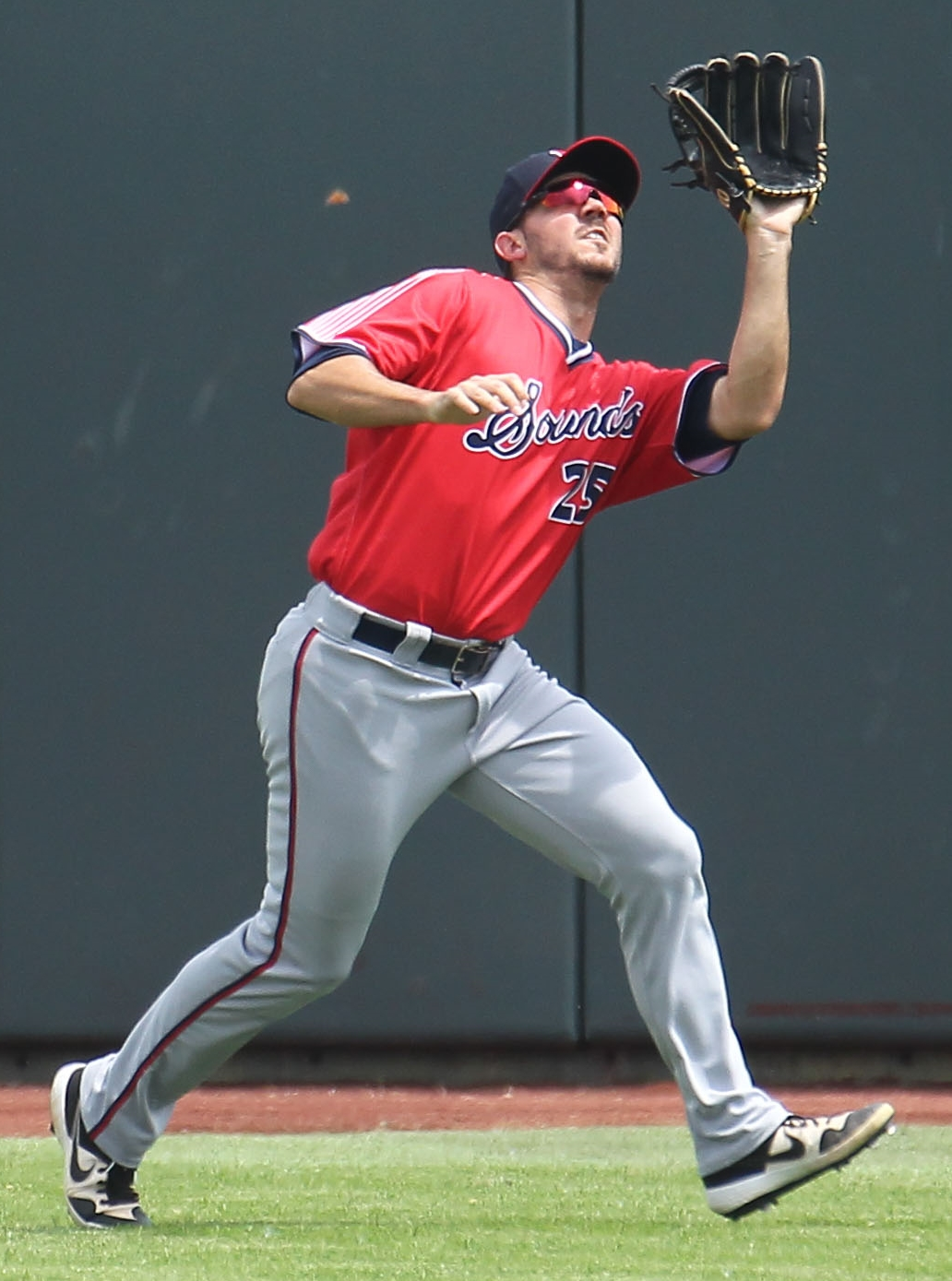
Pill with the Nashville Sounds in 2019

On February 19, 2019, Pill signed a minor league contract with the Texas Rangers as an outfielder. He was released by the Rangers organization on July 15.

After being released by the Rangers organization, Pill retired and is currently a student at CSU Fullerton.

== Personal life ==
Pill is the younger brother of former professional first baseman Brett Pill, who also played college baseball for Cal State Fullerton. Brett later played three seasons in MLB for the San Francisco Giants.

His father, Michael Pill, played three minor league seasons with the Pittsburgh Pirates from 1977-1979.
