= Addison Reed =

American baseball player (born 1988)

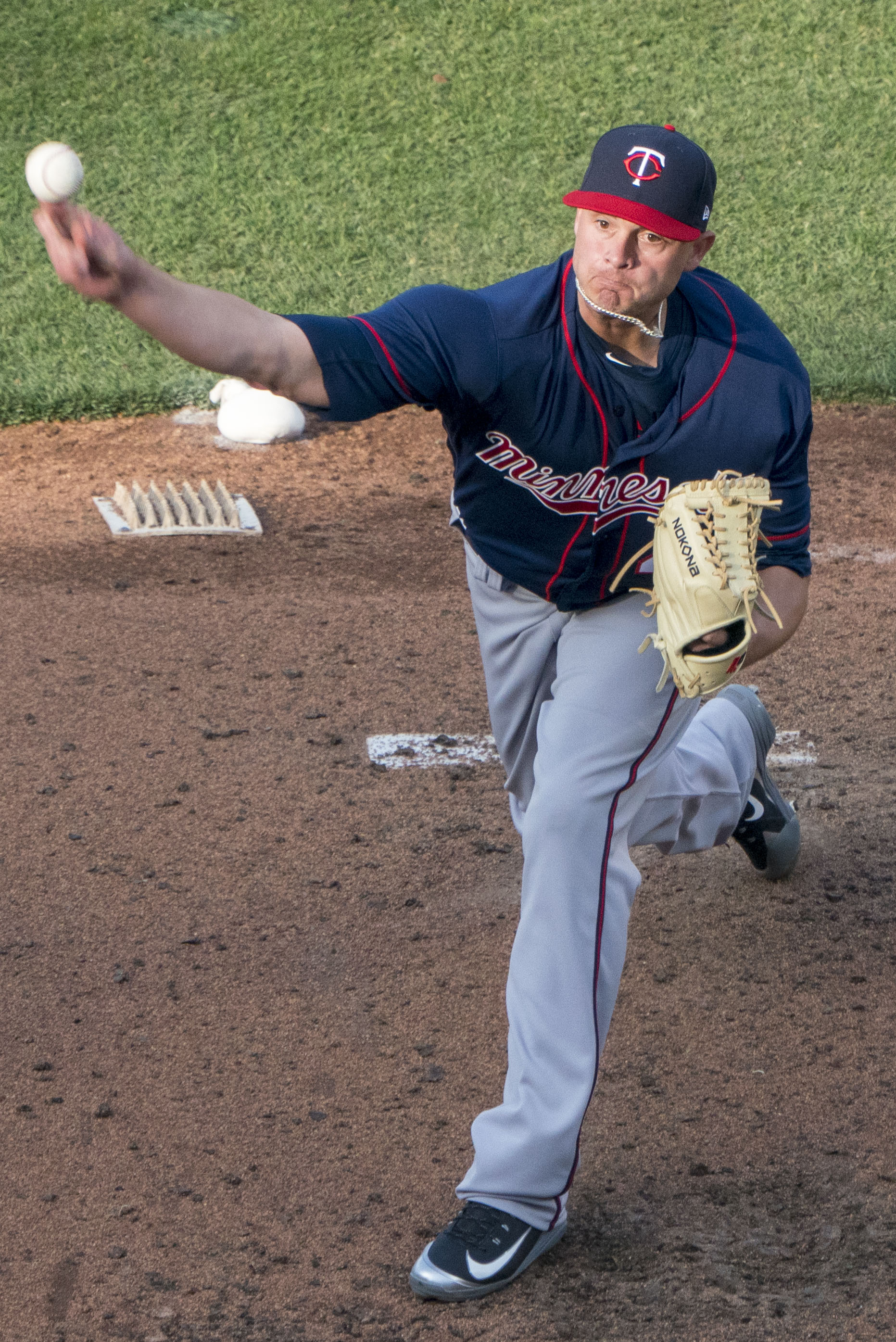
- Reed with the Twins in 2018
- Pitcher
- Born: December 27, 1988 (age 37); Montclair, California, U.S.
- Batted: Left Threw: Right

MLB debut
- September 4, 2011, for the Chicago White Sox

Last MLB appearance
- September 26, 2018, for the Minnesota Twins

MLB statistics
- Win–loss record: 19–27
- Earned run average: 3.53
- Strikeouts: 469
- Saves: 125
- Stats at Baseball Reference

Teams
- Chicago White Sox (2011–2013); Arizona Diamondbacks (2014–2015); New York Mets (2015–2017); Boston Red Sox (2017); Minnesota Twins (2018)

Addison Devon Reed (born December 27, 1988) is an American former professional baseball pitcher. He played in Major League Baseball (MLB) for the Chicago White Sox, Arizona Diamondbacks, New York Mets, Boston Red Sox and Minnesota Twins.

== Amateur career ==
Reed attended Los Osos High School in Rancho Cucamonga, California, and San Diego State University. He played college baseball for the San Diego State Aztecs. In 2009, Reed won the NCBWA Stopper of the Year Award.

== Professional career ==
=== Chicago White Sox ===
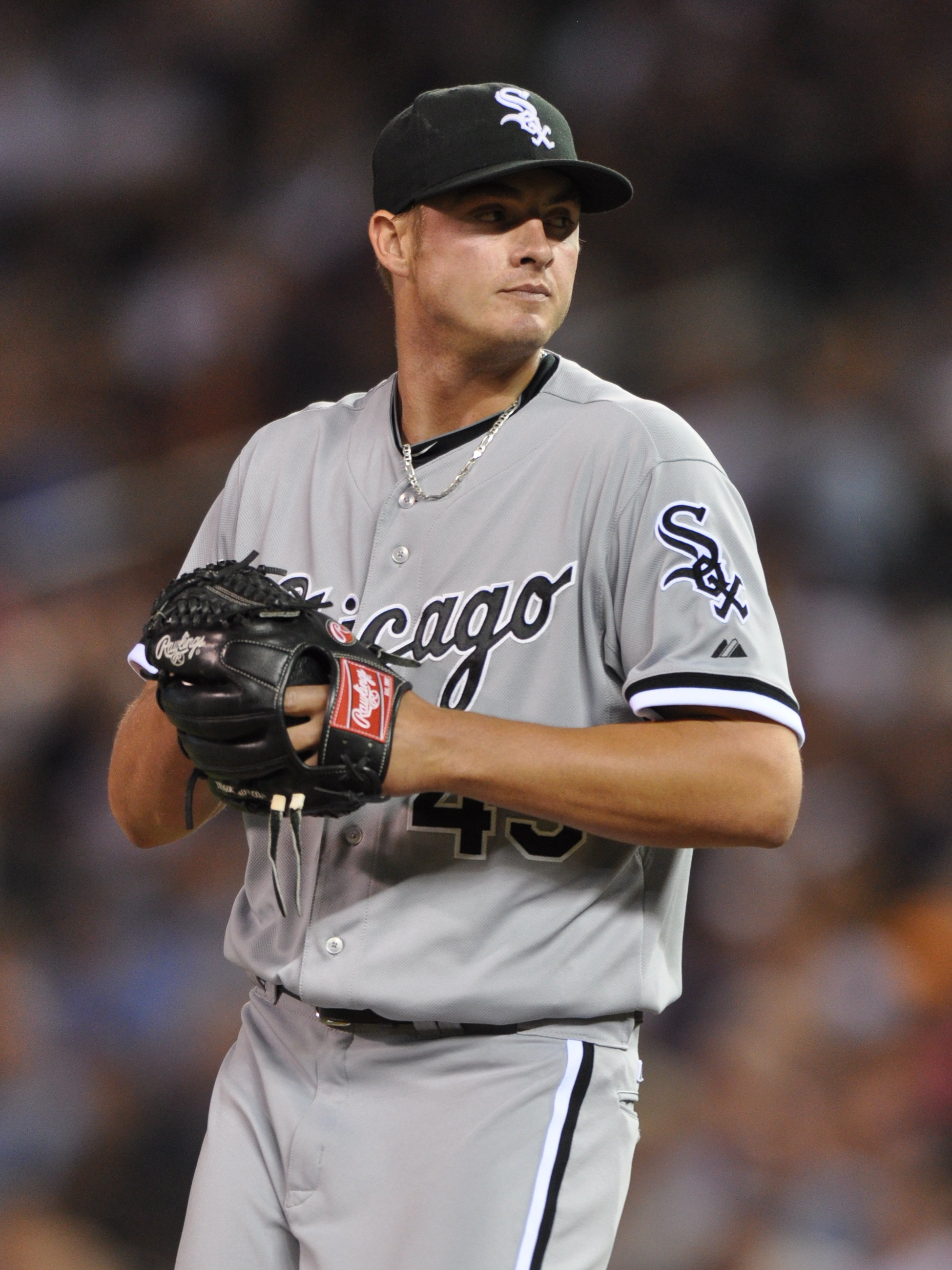
Reed with the Chicago White Sox

The Chicago White Sox selected Reed in the third round of the 2010 Major League Baseball draft. He was named the relief pitcher on Baseball America's 2011 Minor League All Star team.

Reed was called up to the majors for the first time on September 2, 2011. Reed picked up his first career save on May 5, 2012, against the Detroit Tigers pitching one-third of an inning, striking out the only batter he faced, Austin Jackson, during a 3-2 White Sox victory. On May 23, 2012, manager Robin Ventura officially named Reed as the team's closer.

Reed finished the 2012 season with 29 saves despite an ERA of 4.75 in 62 games.

Reed played the 2013 season as the team's closer. Reed earned his 50th career save in a game against the Kansas City Royals on June 22, 2013. On August 22, 2013, Reed saved a sixth consecutive game, becoming the first player in Chicago White Sox history to do so, and the first player in the Major Leagues since Éric Gagné did it for the Los Angeles Dodgers in 2003. Reed finished the year going 40–48 in save opportunities, going 5–4 with a 3.79 ERA, striking out 72 in 71.1 innings over 68 appearances.

=== Arizona Diamondbacks ===
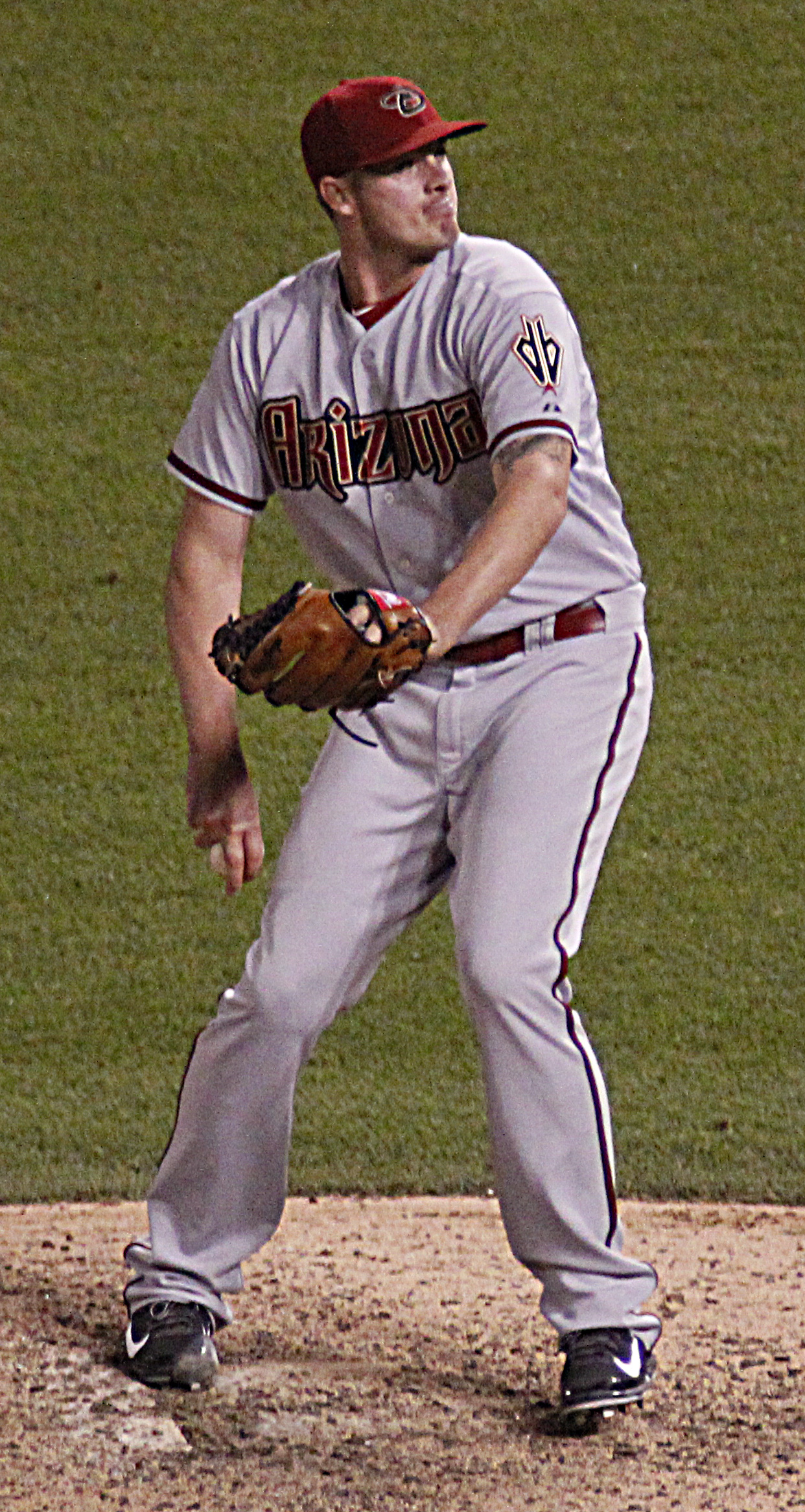
Reed with the Arizona Diamondbacks

On December 16, 2013, the White Sox traded Reed to the Arizona Diamondbacks for infielder Matt Davidson. Reed was named the new Diamondbacks closer for the 2014 season. He was removed from the closer role in May 2015, and optioned to the Reno Aces in June after allowing 16 runs in 24 innings. The Diamondbacks recalled Reed in July.

Reed finished the 2014 season with a record of 1–7, a 4.25 ERA, 32 saves with a 1.21 WHIP in 59 1/3 innings pitched in 62 games.

=== New York Mets ===
On August 30, 2015, the Diamondbacks traded Reed to the New York Mets for Matt Koch and Miller Diaz. Reed was the losing pitcher in the deciding Game 5 of the 2015 World Series. Reed finished the 2015 season with a record of 3-3, 3.38 ERA, 4 saves with 51 Ks and a WHIP of 1.38 in 56 innings pitched in 55 games with both the Diamondbacks and the Mets. He had a major-league-leading 40 holds.

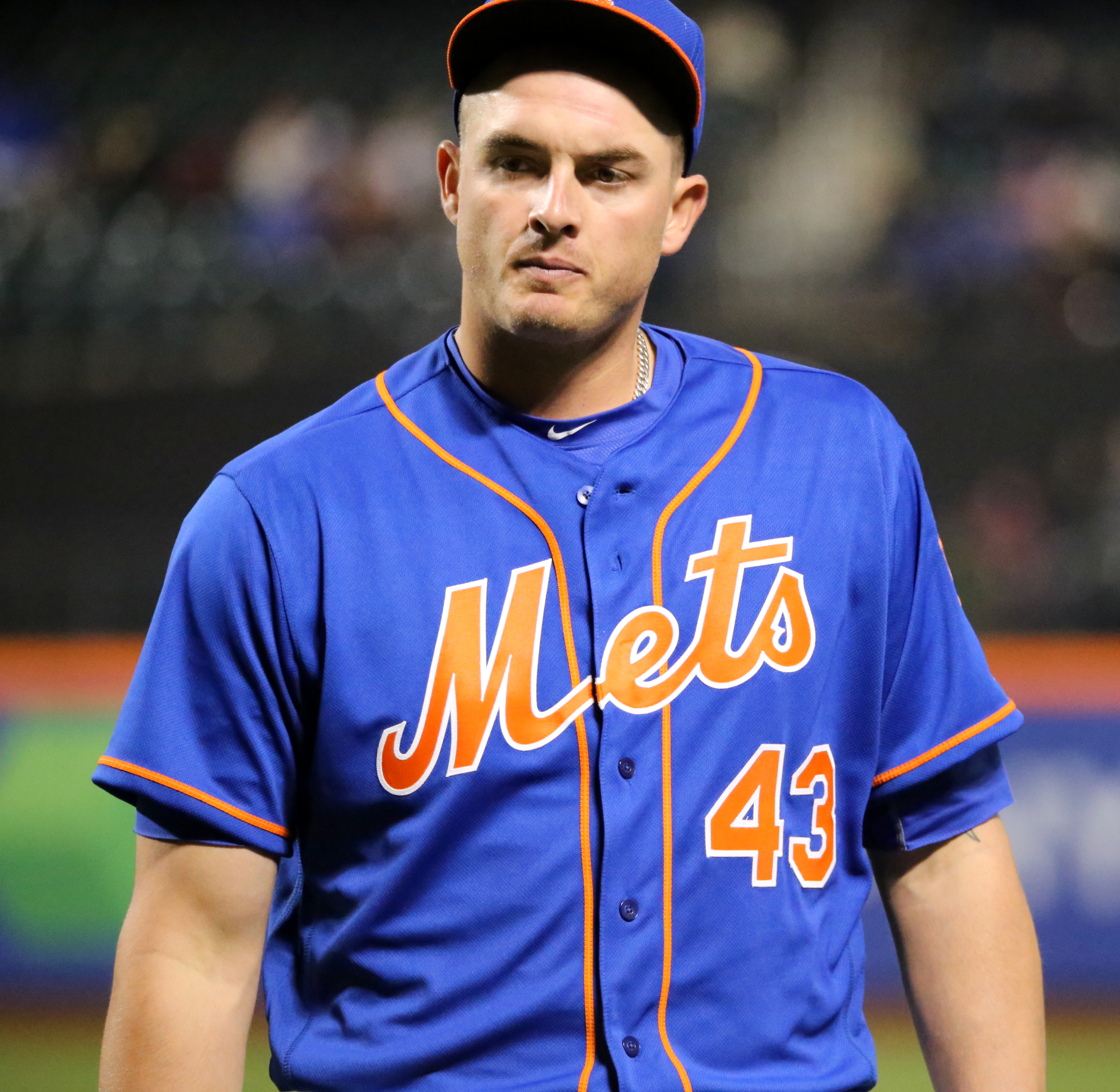
Reed with the Mets in 2016

Reed made the 2016 Opening Day Roster as the setup man for Jeurys Familia. The 2016 season was one of Reed's best, as he posted career numbers as well as nabbing the Mets franchise record for the most holds in a season. In 2017, with Familia injured, Reed served as the Mets' closer.

=== Boston Red Sox ===
On July 31, 2017, the Mets traded Reed to the Boston Red Sox for three minor league pitchers, Jamie Callahan, Stephen Nogosek, and Gerson Bautista. He became a free agent following the season.

=== Minnesota Twins ===
On January 15, 2018, Reed signed a two-year, $16.75 million contract with the Minnesota Twins. Through 55 appearances in 2018, he had an ERA of 4.50 and allowed 65 hits in 56 innings. He began the 2019 season on the injured list with a thumb sprain. He was designated for assignment on May 16, 2019. He was released on May 21.

== Personal life ==
Reed and his wife Cady married in November 2014. They welcomed their first child, a daughter, in July 2015.
