= Jamie Callahan =

American baseball player (born 1994)

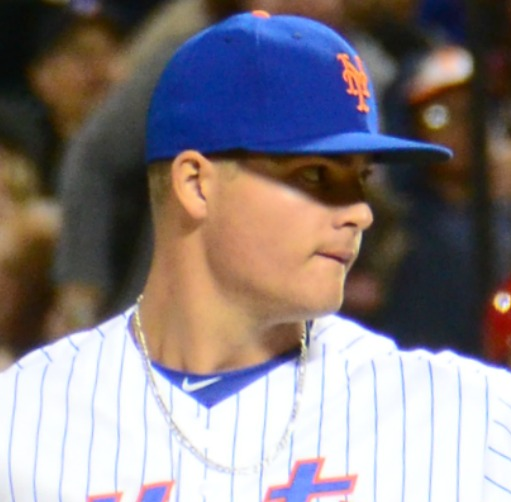
- Callahan with the Mets in 2017
- Pitcher
- Born: August 24, 1994 (age 31); Florence, South Carolina, U.S.
- Batted: Right Threw: Right

MLB debut
- September 2, 2017, for the New York Mets

Last MLB appearance
- October 1, 2017, for the New York Mets

MLB statistics
- Win–loss record: 0–0
- Earned run average: 4.05
- Strikeouts: 5
- Stats at Baseball Reference

Teams
- New York Mets (2017)

James Douglas Callahan (born August 24, 1994) is an American former professional baseball pitcher. He has previously played in Major League Baseball (MLB) for the New York Mets.

== Career ==
Callahan attended Dillon High School. He earned the 2012 Gatorade South Carolina Baseball Player of the Year and Region 8-2A Player of the Year in his senior season, after posting a 7–1 win–loss record with a 0.89 earned run average (ERA) and 111 strikeouts in 50 innings pitched to help his team reach the regional championship. In addition, he was an All-State selection in 2011 and 2012. Callahan committed to play college baseball for the South Carolina Gamecocks.

=== Boston Red Sox ===
The Boston Red Sox selected Callahan in the second round (87th overall) of the 2012 MLB draft and he chose to forego his commitment to South Carolina in favor of a $565,500 signing bonus. He was assigned immediately to the Gulf Coast Red Sox where he was 1–0 with a 5.19 ERA in 8.2 innings pitched. In 2013 he pitched for the Lowell Spinners where he was 5–1 with a 3.92 ERA in 13 games (12 starts), in 2014 he played with the Greenville Drive where he pitched to a 3–13 record with a 6.96 ERA in 25 starts, and in 2015 he returned to Greenville where he was 7–6 with a 4.53 ERA in 31 games (six starts). Callahan spent 2016 with the Salem Red Sox where he posted a 5–3 record and 3.29 ERA in 36 relief appearances, and he began 2017 with the Portland Sea Dogs. He was promoted to the Pawtucket Red Sox in May.

=== New York Mets ===
On July 31, 2017, the New York Mets acquired Callahan, Stephen Nogosek, and Gerson Bautista in exchange for Addison Reed. New York assigned him to the Las Vegas 51s. The Mets promoted Callahan to the major leagues on September 1. In 41 relief appearances between Portland, Pawtucket, and Las Vegas prior to his promotion he was 6–3 with a 2.94 ERA. He made his Major League debut on September 2 against the Houston Astros at Minute Maid Park.

Callahan was assigned to Las Vegas to begin the 2018 season. He was placed on the disabled list in April and he underwent shoulder surgery in June, thus ending his season. He elected free agency on November 2, 2018.

=== San Francisco Giants ===
On December 28, 2018, Callahan signed a minor league contract with the San Francisco Giants that included an invitation to spring training. He split the 2019 campaign between the rookie–level Arizona League Giants, High–A San Jose Giants, Double–A Richmond Flying Squirrels, Triple–A Sacramento River Cats. In 22 appearances split between the four affiliates, Callahan accumulated a 5.01 ERA with 30 strikeouts and 4 saves across 23 1/3 innings pitched. He elected free agency following the season on November 4, 2019.

=== Chicago Dogs ===
On June 17, 2020, Callahan signed with the Chicago Dogs of the American Association. He struggled in 4 games, going 0–1 with an 8.10 ERA and two strikeouts in 3 1/3 innings. Callahan was released by the Dogs on August 24.

=== Gastonia Honey Hunters ===
On May 21, 2021, Callahan signed with the Gastonia Honey Hunters of the Atlantic League of Professional Baseball. In 26 games for Gastonia, he logged a 2–0 record and 7.04 ERA with 25 strikeouts over 23 innings of work. Callahan became a free agent following the season.

=== Wild Health Genomes ===
On April 26, 2022, Callahan signed with the Wild Health Genomes of the Atlantic League of Professional Baseball. He appeared in 9 games going 1–0 with a 1.08 ERA and 7 strikeouts in 8 1/3 innings. Callahan became a free agent following the season.
