= Robert Gsellman =

American baseball player (born 1993)

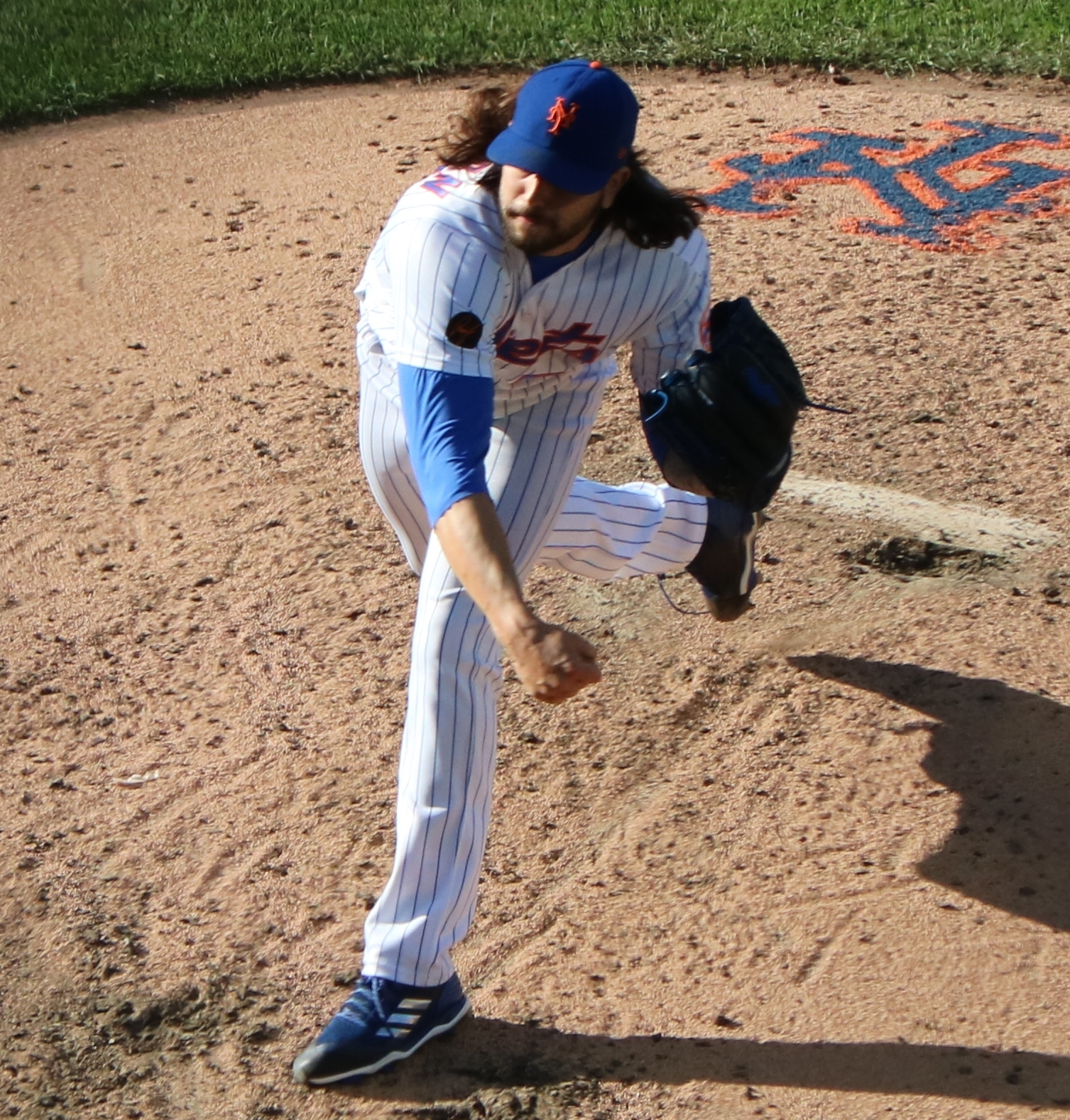
- Gsellman with the Mets in 2018

Bravos de León – No. 65
- Pitcher
- Born: July 18, 1993 (age 32); Santa Monica, California, U.S.
- Bats: Right Throws: Right

Professional debut
- MLB: August 23, 2016, for the New York Mets
- NPB: August 27, 2022, for the Yokohama DeNA BayStars

MLB statistics (through 2022 season)
- Win–loss record: 20–18
- Earned run average: 4.60
- Strikeouts: 289

NPB statistics (through 2023 season)
- Win–loss record: 4–6
- Earned run average: 4.02
- Strikeouts: 55
- Stats at Baseball Reference

Teams
- New York Mets (2016–2021); Chicago Cubs (2022); Yokohama DeNA BayStars (2022–2023)

Robert John Gsellman (/ɡəˈzɛlmən/ gə-ZEL-mən; born July 18, 1993) is an American professional baseball pitcher for the Bravos de León of the Mexican League. He has previously played in Major League Baseball for the New York Mets and Chicago Cubs, and in Nippon Professional Baseball (NPB) for the Yokohama DeNA BayStars.

== Early life and amateur career ==
Gsellman is the son of Bob Gsellman, a former minor league catcher drafted by the Philadelphia Phillies in the 23rd round of the 1984 MLB draft from Culver City High School in California. Gsellman attended Westchester High School in Los Angeles, where he played both basketball and baseball. He was a California Interscholastic Federation state champion in basketball as a junior and voted team captain as a senior. As a junior baseball player, he had a .649 batting average and 1.67 ERA. He was also named to ESPN RISE's Underclassmen All-California team. As a senior, he finished with a .608 batting average with eight home runs and a 1.70 ERA. He verbally committed to Los Angeles Harbor College as a senior.

== Professional career ==
=== New York Mets ===
Gsellman was drafted by the New York Mets in the 13th round of the 2011 Major League Baseball draft. He signed with the Mets and made his professional debut with the Gulf Coast Mets. From 2012 to 2015 he played for the Kingsport Mets, Brooklyn Cyclones, Savannah Sand Gnats, St. Lucie Mets and Binghamton Mets. During 2015 with St. Lucie, he was named to the FSL mid-season All Star team, however, did not participate due to his promotion to Binghamton. The Mets added him to their 40-man roster after the season. Also, the team announced that Robert Gsellman was named the Sterling Organizational Pitcher of The Year. For the year Gsellman went 13-7 with a 2.89 ERA in 24 combined starts for St. Lucie and Binghamton. He led the organization with 13 wins and was third in the organization in ERA among qualified pitchers.

Gsellman began the 2016 season with the Las Vegas 51s of the Triple–A Pacific Coast League. The Mets promoted him to the major leagues on August 22 when Steven Matz was placed on the disabled list. Gsellman made his Major League debut on August 23, 2016. Taking over for Jonathan Niese, who had left the game with left knee pain after pitching 1/3 of an inning, Gsellman pitched 3 and 1/3 innings, racking up 2 strikeouts, giving up no runs, and earning his first Major League win, the second Met rookie to do so in his debut in 2016, after Gabriel Ynoa. Due to an injury to his labrum, Gsellman was unable to swing the bat during his 2016 Major League stint. Nevertheless, on September 25 at Citi Field, Gsellman picked up his first Major League hit on a bunt off of Phillies pitcher Jake Thompson.

Gsellman began the 2017 season as a member of the Mets starting rotation. He was 8-7 with a 5.19 ERA. Batters reached base against him on errors 16 times, tops in the major leagues.

In the 2018 season, Gsellman pitched exclusively out of the bullpen for the Mets. He was 6-3 with a 4.28 ERA and 13 saves. On May 20, he picked up five outs against the Arizona Diamondbacks and recorded the first save of his major league career.

In 2019 for the Mets, Gsellman pitched to a 4.66 ERA in 63.2 innings across 52 appearances before suffering a partially torn right lat in August that would cause him to miss the remainder of the season.

Gsellman opened the pandemic shortened 2020 season on the injured list due to right triceps soreness. On September 8, 2020, Gsellman suffered a fractured rib in an appearance against the Baltimore Orioles, and missed the remainder of the 2020 season. On the year, Gsellman had pitched to a ghastly 9.64 ERA in six appearances, four of them starts, to go along with 9 strikeouts in 14.0 innings pitched.

On June 23, 2021, Gsellman was placed on the 60-day injured list with a right lat strain.

On November 30, Gsellman was non-tendered, making him a free agent.

=== Chicago Cubs ===
On March 17, 2022, Gsellman signed a minor league contract with the Chicago Cubs. He was assigned to the Triple-A Iowa Cubs to begin the season, pitching to a 1.17 ERA with 12 strikeouts in 5 appearances. On May 3, Gsellman was selected to the active roster. In 8 appearances with Chicago, he posted a 4.70 ERA and 1.30 WHIP in 15.1 innings pitched. He was designated for assignment on May 30. He cleared waivers and was sent outright to Triple-A Iowa on June 2. He was released on July 13, 2022.

=== Yokohama DeNA BayStars ===
On July 28, 2022, Gsellman signed with the Yokohama DeNA BayStars of Nippon Professional Baseball. He re-signed a one-year contract extension for the 2023 season on November 26, 2022. He became a free agent following the 2023 season.

=== Washington Nationals ===
On January 31, 2024, Gsellman signed a minor league contract with the Washington Nationals. In 17 games for the Triple–A Rochester Red Wings, he struggled to an 8.75 ERA with 34 strikeouts across 36 innings of work. On June 19, Gsellman was released by the Nationals organization.

=== Lake Country DockHounds ===
On April 7, 2025, Gsellman signed with the Lake Country DockHounds of the American Association of Professional Baseball. In 36 games as a relief pitcher, he posted a 3-2 record with a 3.38 ERA, 40 strikeouts, and eight saves across 40 innings pitched.

=== Bravos de León ===
On February 20, 2026, Gsellman's contract was transferred to the Bravos de León of the Mexican League.
