= 2018 Philadelphia Phillies season =

Major League Baseball season

2018 Philadelphia Phillies
- League: National League
- Division: East
- Ballpark: Citizens Bank Park
- City: Philadelphia
- Record: 80–82 (.494)
- Divisional place: 3rd
- Owners: John Middleton, Bill Giles, David Montgomery
- General managers: Matt Klentak
- Managers: Gabe Kapler
- Television: NBC Sports Philadelphia; NBC Sports Philadelphia + NBC Philadelphia (Tom McCarthy, John Kruk, Ben Davis, Mike Schmidt, Gregg Murphy)
- Radio: Phillies Radio Network; WIP SportsRadio 94.1 FM (English) (Scott Franzke, Larry Andersen, Jim Jackson); WTTM (Spanish) (Danny Martinez, Bill Kulik, Rickie Ricardo)
- Stats: ESPN.com; Baseball Reference

The 2018 Philadelphia Phillies season was the 136th season in the history of the franchise, its 15th season at Citizens Bank Park, and the first season with manager Gabe Kapler. They improved from their 66–96 season in 2017 by posting an 80–82 record, but missed the postseason for the seventh consecutive season. Kapler had the second-most wins among Phillies managers historically after 100 games (56), and under Kapler, the 2018 team improved its end-of-season won-lost record by 14 games. Despite these improvements, the team ended the season with a massive collapse in late August and September after staying above .500 most of the season.

== Season standings ==
=== National League East ===
NL East
Team	W	L	Pct.	GB	Home	Road
Atlanta Braves	90	72	.556	—	43‍–‍38	47‍–‍34
Washington Nationals	82	80	.506	8	41‍–‍40	41‍–‍40
Philadelphia Phillies	80	82	.494	10	49‍–‍32	31‍–‍50
New York Mets	77	85	.475	13	37‍–‍44	40‍–‍41
Miami Marlins	63	98	.391	26½	38‍–‍43	25‍–‍55

=== National League Wild Card ===
Division leaders
Team	W	L	Pct.
Milwaukee Brewers	96	67	.589
Los Angeles Dodgers	92	71	.564
Atlanta Braves	90	72	.556

Wild Card teams (Top 2 teams qualify for postseason)
Team	W	L	Pct.	GB
Chicago Cubs	95	68	.583	+4
Colorado Rockies	91	72	.558	—
St. Louis Cardinals	88	74	.543	2½
Pittsburgh Pirates	82	79	.509	8
Arizona Diamondbacks	82	80	.506	8½
Washington Nationals	82	80	.506	8½
Philadelphia Phillies	80	82	.494	10½
New York Mets	77	85	.475	13½
San Francisco Giants	73	89	.451	17½
Cincinnati Reds	67	95	.414	23½
San Diego Padres	66	96	.407	24½
Miami Marlins	63	98	.391	27

=== Record vs. opponents ===
2018 National League record Source: MLB Standings Grid – 2018
Team	AZ	ATL	CHC	CIN	COL	LAD	MIA	MIL	NYM	PHI	PIT	SD	SF	STL	WSH	AL
Arizona	—	3–4	3–4	3–3	8–11	11–8	6–1	1–5	2–5	4–2	6–1	12–7	8–11	3–3	2–5	10–10
Atlanta	4–3	—	3–3	3–4	2–5	2–5	14–5	3–4	13–6	12–7	5–1	4–3	3–3	4–2	10–9	8–12
Chicago	4–3	3–3	—	11–8	3–3	4–3	5–2	11–9	6–1	4–2	10–9	5–2	3–3	9–10	4–3	13–7
Cincinnati	3–3	4–3	8–11	—	2–4	6–1	2–5	6–13	3–3	3–4	5–14	3–4	4–2	7–12	1–6	10–10
Colorado	11–8	5–2	3–3	4–2	—	7–13	2–4	2–5	6–1	5–2	3–3	11–8	12–7	2–5	5–2	13–7
Los Angeles	8–11	5–2	3–4	1–6	13–7	—	2–4	4–3	4–2	3–4	5–1	14–5	10–9	3–4	5–1	12–8
Miami	1–6	5–14	2–5	5–2	4–2	4–2	—	2–5	7–12	8–11	1–4	2–5	4–3	3–3	6–13	9–11
Milwaukee	5–1	4–3	9–11	13–6	5–2	3–4	5–2	—	4–3	3–3	7–12	4–2	6–1	11–8	4–2	13–7
New York	5–2	6–13	1–6	3–3	1–6	2–4	12–7	3–4	—	11–8	3–4	4–2	4–3	3–3	11–8	8–12
Philadelphia	2–4	7–12	2–4	4–3	2–5	4–3	11–8	3–3	8–11	—	6–1	3–3	4–3	4–3	8–11	12–8
Pittsburgh	1–6	1–5	9–10	14–5	3–3	1–5	4–1	12–7	4–3	1–6	—	3–4	4–3	8–11	2–5	15–5
San Diego	7–12	3–4	2–5	4–3	8–11	5–14	5–2	2–4	2–4	3–3	4–3	—	8–11	4–3	2–4	7–13
San Francisco	11–8	3–3	3–3	2–4	7–12	9–10	3–4	1–6	3–4	3–4	3–4	11–8	—	2–5	4–2	8–12
St. Louis	3–3	2–4	10–9	12–7	5–2	4–3	3–3	8–11	3–3	3–4	11–8	3–4	5–2	—	5–2	11–9
Washington	5–2	9–10	3–4	6–1	2–5	1–5	13–6	2–4	8–11	11–8	5–2	4–2	2–4	2–5	—	9–11

The October 1 tiebreaker games were regular-season games that are included here.

=== Game log ===
Legend
	Phillies win
	Phillies loss
	Postponement
**Bold**	Phillies team member

2018 Game Log Overall Record: 80–82
March (1–2)

#	Date	Opponent	Score	Win	Loss	Save	Attendance	Record
1	March 29	@ Braves	5–8	Arodys Vizcaíno (1–0)	**Héctor Neris** (0–1)	—	40,208	0–1
2	March 30	@ Braves	5–4 (11)	**Drew Hutchison** (1–0)	Shane Carle (0–1)	—	35,123	1–1
3	March 31	@ Braves	2–15	Brandon McCarthy (1–0)	**Vince Velasquez** (0–1)	—	37,777	1–2

April (15–10)

#	Date	Opponent	Score	Win	Loss	Save	Attendance	Record
—	April 2	@ Mets	Postponed (cold and wet conditions; snow) Makeup: July 9 as a single-admission doubleheader					
4	April 3	@ Mets	0–2	Jerry Blevins (1–0)	**Ben Lively** (0–1)	Jeurys Familia (2)	21,397	1–3
5	April 4	@ Mets	2–4	Robert Gsellman (1–0)	**Drew Hutchison** (1–1)	Jeurys Familia (3)	21,328	1–4
6	April 5	Marlins	5–0	**Nick Pivetta** (1–0)	Caleb Smith (0–1)	—	44,488	2–4
7	April 7	Marlins	20–1	**Vince Velasquez** (1–1)	Dillon Peters (1–1)	**Jake Thompson** (1)	33,660	3–4
8	April 8	Marlins	3–6	Odrisamer Despaigne (2–0)	**Luis García** (0–1)	Brad Ziegler (1)	34,326	3–5
9	April 9	Reds	6–5	**Luis García** (1–1)	Kevin Quackenbush (0–1)	**Héctor Neris** (1)	18,127	4–5
10	April 10	Reds	6–1	**Aaron Nola** (1–0)	Jared Hughes (0–1)	—	20,895	5–5
11	April 11	Reds	4–3 (12)	**Yacksel Ríos** (1–0)	Austin Brice (0–1)	—	19,099	6–5
12	April 13	@ Rays	2–1	**Edubray Ramos** (1–0)	Álex Colomé (0–2)	**Héctor Neris** (2)	13,372	7–5
13	April 14	@ Rays	9–4	**Jake Arrieta** (1–0)	Chris Archer (1–1)	—	20,934	8–5
14	April 15	@ Rays	10–4	**Yacksel Ríos** (2–0)	Ryan Yarbrough (0–1)	—	19,841	9–5
15	April 16	@ Braves	1–2	Julio Teherán (1–1)	**Aaron Nola** (1–1)	Arodys Vizcaíno (1)	17,812	9–6
16	April 17	@ Braves	5–1 (10)	**Héctor Neris** (1–1)	José Ramírez (0–2)	—	17,913	10–6
17	April 18	@ Braves	3–7	Brandon McCarthy (3–0)	**Vince Velasquez** (1–2)	—	22,135	10–7
18	April 19	Pirates	7–0	**Jake Arrieta** (2–0)	Jameson Taillon (2–1)	—	19,071	11–7
19	April 20	Pirates	2–1	**Luis García** (2–1)	George Kontos (1–2)	**Héctor Neris** (3)	20,183	12–7
20	April 21	Pirates	6–2	**Aaron Nola** (2–1)	Michael Feliz (0–1)	**Héctor Neris** (4)	28,161	13–7
21	April 22	Pirates	3–2 (11)	**Yacksel Ríos** (3–0)	Richard Rodríguez (0–1)	—	29,199	14–7
22	April 24	Diamondbacks	4–8	Fernando Salas (3–1)	**Vince Velasquez** (1–3)	—	18,195	14–8
23	April 25	Diamondbacks	5–3	**Jake Arrieta** (3–0)	Zack Greinke (2–2)	**Héctor Neris** (5)	21,349	15–8
24	April 26	Diamondbacks	2–8	Matt Koch (1–0)	**Ben Lively** (0–2)	—	20,335	15–9
25	April 27	Braves	7–3	**Aaron Nola** (3–1)	Max Fried (0–2)	—	27,076	16–9
26	April 28	Braves	1–4	Mike Foltynewicz (2–1)	**Nick Pivetta** (1–1)	Arodys Vizcaíno (3)	27,794	16–10
27	April 29	Braves	1–10	Brandon McCarthy (4–0)	**Vince Velasquez** (1–4)	—	30,010	16–11
28	April 30	@ Marlins	4–8	Merandy González (2–0)	**Jake Arrieta** (3–1)	—	5,415	16–12

May (15–11)

#	Date	Opponent	Score	Win	Loss	Save	Attendance	Record
29	May 1	@ Marlins	1–2 (10)	Junichi Tazawa (1–1)	**Yacksel Ríos** (3–1)	—	5,844	16–13
30	May 2	@ Marlins	6–0	**Aaron Nola** (4–1)	José Ureña (0–5)	—	5,941	17–13
31	May 4	@ Nationals	3–7	Gio González (4–2)	**Nick Pivetta** (1–2)	–	35,497	17–14
32	May 5	@ Nationals	3–1	**Vince Velasquez** (2–4)	Tanner Roark (2–3)	**Héctor Neris** (6)	34,687	18–14
33	May 6	@ Nationals	4–5	Sean Doolittle (1–1)	**Héctor Neris** (1–2)	—	30,611	18–15
34	May 7	Giants	11–0	**Zach Eflin** (1–0)	Jeff Samardzija (1–2)	—	17,050	19–15
35	May 8	Giants	4–2	**Aaron Nola** (5–1)	Derek Holland (1–4)	**Héctor Neris** (7)	22,456	20–15
36	May 9	Giants	11–3	**Nick Pivetta** (2–2)	Chris Stratton (3–3)	—	18,448	21–15
37	May 10	Giants	6–3	**Vince Velasquez** (3–4)	Ty Blach (3–4)	**Héctor Neris** (8)	30,204	22–15
38	May 11	Mets	1–3	A. J. Ramos (2–2)	**Héctor Neris** (1–3)	Jeurys Familia (11)	29,247	22–16
—	May 12	Mets	Postponed (rain) Makeup: August 16 as a single-admission doubleheader					
39	May 13	Mets	4–2	**Aaron Nola** (6–1)	Paul Sewald (0–3)	**Edubray Ramos** (1)	34,091	23–16
—	May 15	@ Orioles	Postponed (rain) Makeup: July 12 as a single game					
40	May 16	@ Orioles	4–1	**Nick Pivetta** (3–2)	Andrew Cashner (1–5)	—	29,706	24–16
41	May 17	@ Cardinals	6–2	**Vince Velasquez** (4–4)	Luke Weaver (3–3)	—	41,309	25–16
42	May 18	@ Cardinals	4–12	Michael Wacha (5–1)	**Jake Arrieta** (3–2)	—	42,050	25–17
43	May 19	@ Cardinals	7–6	**Tommy Hunter** (1–0)	Greg Holland (0–2)	**Seranthony Domínguez** (1)	44,431	26–17
44	May 20	@ Cardinals	1–5	Jack Flaherty (1–1)	**Aaron Nola** (6–2)	—	43,560	26–18
45	May 21	Braves	3–0	**Nick Pivetta** (4–2)	Mike Foltynewicz (3–3)	**Héctor Neris** (9)	21,284	27–18
46	May 22	Braves	1–3	Brandon McCarthy (5–2)	**Vince Velasquez** (4–5)	Arodys Vizcaíno (9)	18,545	27–19
47	May 23	Braves	4–0	**Jake Arrieta** (4–2)	Luiz Gohara (0–1)	—	27,647	28–19
48	May 25	Blue Jays	5–6	Sam Gaviglio (2–0)	**Zach Eflin** (1–1)	Ryan Tepera (1)	21,374	28–20
49	May 26	Blue Jays	2–1	**Seranthony Domínguez** (1–0)	Joe Biagini (0–4)	**Luis García** (1)	26,788	29–20
50	May 27	Blue Jays	3–5	J. A. Happ (7–3)	**Nick Pivetta** (4–3)	Ryan Tepera (2)	24,182	29–21
51	May 28	@ Dodgers	4–5	Yimi García (1–0)	**Adam Morgan** (0–1)	Kenley Jansen (12)	39,759	29–22
52	May 29	@ Dodgers	6–1	**Jake Arrieta** (5–2)	Kenta Maeda (4–4)	—	40,044	30–22
53	May 30	@ Dodgers	2–8	Ross Stripling (3–1)	**Zach Eflin** (1–2)	—	43,302	30–23
54	May 31	@ Dodgers	2–1	**Aaron Nola** (7–2)	Josh Fields (2–2)	**Seranthony Domínguez** (2)	40,986	31–23

June (13–14)

#	Date	Opponent	Score	Win	Loss	Save	Attendance	Record
55	June 1	@ Giants	0–4	Chris Stratton (7–3)	**Nick Pivetta** (4–4)	—	38,119	31–24
56	June 2	@ Giants	0–2	Andrew Suarez (2–4)	**Vince Velasquez** (4–6)	Hunter Strickland (12)	39,208	31–25
57	June 3	@ Giants	1–6	Dereck Rodríguez (1–0)	**Jake Arrieta** (5–3)	—	40,491	31–26
58	June 5	@ Cubs	6–1	**Zach Eflin** (2–2)	Kyle Hendricks (4–5)	—	40,553	32–26
59	June 6	@ Cubs	5–7	Cory Mazzoni (1–0)	**Adam Morgan** (0–2)	—	40,275	32–27
60	June 7	@ Cubs	3–4	Brian Duensing (2–0)	**Nick Pivetta** (4–5)	Brandon Morrow (15)	40,057	32–28
61	June 8	Brewers	4–12	Jhoulys Chacín (5–1)	**Vince Velasquez** (4–7)	—	22,196	32–29
62	June 9	Brewers	3–12	Brent Suter (6–4)	**Jake Arrieta** (5–4)	—	25,304	32–30
63	June 10	Brewers	4–3	**Zach Eflin** (3–2)	Dan Jennings (3–2)	**Tommy Hunter** (1)	31,175	33–30
64	June 12	Rockies	5–4	**Aaron Nola** (8–2)	Jon Gray (6–7)	**Seranthony Domínguez** (3)	19,556	34–30
65	June 13	Rockies	2–7	Tyler Anderson (4–1)	**Nick Pivetta** (4–6)	—	20,075	34–31
66	June 14	Rockies	9–3	**Vince Velasquez** (5–7)	Germán Márquez (4–7)	—	22,500	35–31
67	June 15	@ Brewers	2–13	Brent Suter (7–4)	**Jake Arrieta** (5–5)	—	40,945	35–32
68	June 16	@ Brewers	4–1	**Zach Eflin** (4–2)	Junior Guerra (3–5)	**Héctor Neris** (10)	40,531	36–32
69	June 17	@ Brewers	10–9	**Tommy Hunter** (2–0)	Chase Anderson (5–6)	**Jake Thompson** (2)	40,985	37–32
70	June 18	Cardinals	6–5 (10)	**Jake Thompson** (1–0)	Matt Bowman (0–2)	—	22,083	38–32
71	June 19	Cardinals	6–7	Jordan Hicks (3–1)	**Seranthony Domínguez** (1–1)	—	21,122	38–33
72	June 20	Cardinals	4–3	**Edubray Ramos** (2–0)	Sam Tuivailala (1–3)	**Adam Morgan** (1)	26,120	39–33
73	June 22	@ Nationals	12–2	**Zach Eflin** (5–2)	Tanner Roark (3–8)	—	35,630	40–33
74	June 23	@ Nationals	5–3	**Aaron Nola** (9–2)	Erick Fedde (0–3)	**Seranthony Domínguez** (4)	40,341	41–33
75	June 24	@ Nationals	6–8	Ryan Madson (2–3)	**Seranthony Domínguez** (1–2)	Sean Doolittle (21)	29,314	41–34
76	June 25	Yankees	2–4	Jonathan Loáisiga (2–0)	**Vince Velasquez** (5–8)	Aroldis Chapman (28)	44,136	41–35
77	June 26	Yankees	0–6	Luis Severino (12–2)	**Jake Arrieta** (5–6)	—	43,569	41–36
78	June 27	Yankees	3–0	**Zach Eflin** (6–2)	Luis Cessa (0–1)	**Seranthony Domínguez** (5)	42,028	42–36
79	June 28	Nationals	4–3	**Aaron Nola** (10–2)	Tanner Roark (3–9)	**Seranthony Domínguez** (6)	25,026	43–36
80	June 29	Nationals	7–17	Erick Fedde (1–3)	**Nick Pivetta** (4–7)	—	36,903	43–37
81	June 30	Nationals	3–2	**Víctor Arano** (1–0)	Jeremy Hellickson (2–1)	**Seranthony Domínguez** (7)	42,746	44–37

July (15–11)

#	Date	Opponent	Score	Win	Loss	Save	Attendance	Record
82	July 1	Nationals	4–3 (13)	**Nick Pivetta** (5–7)	Justin Miller (5–1)	—	22,051	45–37
83	July 3	Orioles	3–2	**Zach Eflin** (7–2)	Alex Cobb (2–10)	**Seranthony Domínguez** (8)	28,204	46–37
84	July 4	Orioles	4–1	**Aaron Nola** (11–2)	Yefry Ramírez (0–2)	**Víctor Arano** (1)	30,943	47–37
85	July 6	@ Pirates	17–5	**Edubray Ramos** (3–0)	Trevor Williams (6–7)	—	24,846	48–37
86	July 7	@ Pirates	3–2	**Jake Arrieta** (6–6)	Jameson Taillon (5–7)	**Víctor Arano** (2)	28,150	49–37
87	July 8	@ Pirates	1–4	Nick Kingham (3–4)	**Drew Anderson** (0–1)	Felipe Vázquez (18)	19,542	49–38
88	July 9 (1)	@ Mets	3–4 (10)	Tim Peterson (2–1)	**Víctor Arano** (1–1)	—	see 2nd game	49–39
89	July 9 (2)	@ Mets	3–1	**Aaron Nola** (12–2)	Corey Oswalt (0–2)	**Víctor Arano** (3)	24,139	50–39
90	July 10	@ Mets	7–3	**Enyel De Los Santos** (1–0)	Drew Gagnon (0–1)	—	22,416	51–39
91	July 11	@ Mets	0–3 (10)	Robert Gsellman (6–2)	**Mark Leiter Jr.** (0–1)	—	22,137	51–40
92	July 12	@ Orioles	5–4	**Nick Pivetta** (6–7)	Kevin Gausman (4–7)	**Seranthony Domínguez** (9)	20,100	52–40
93	July 13	@ Marlins	2–0	**Jake Arrieta** (7–6)	Wei-Yin Chen (2–7)	**Pat Neshek** (1)	8,090	53–40
94	July 14	@ Marlins	0–2	Trevor Richards (3–5)	**Aaron Nola** (12–3)	Kyle Barraclough (9)	14,793	53–41
95	July 15	@ Marlins	5–10	Elieser Hernández (2–5)	**Edubray Ramos** (3–1)	—	8,829	53–42
–	July 17	**2018 Major League Baseball All-Star Game at Nationals Park in Washington, D.C.**						
96	July 20	Padres	11–5	**Austin Davis** (1–0)	Clayton Richard (7–9)	—	30,034	54–42
—	July 21	Padres	Postponed (rain) Makeup: July 22 as a split-admission doubleheader					
97	July 22 (1)	Padres	2–10	Tyson Ross (6–8)	**Nick Pivetta** (6–8)	—	29,392	54–43
98	July 22 (2)	Padres	5–0	**Vince Velasquez** (6–8)	Luis Perdomo (1–5)	—	25,054	55–43
99	July 23	Dodgers	6–7	Scott Alexander (2–0)	**Seranthony Domínguez** (1–3)	Kenley Jansen (29)	33,753	55–44
100	July 24	Dodgers	7–4 (16)	**Vince Velasquez** (7–8)	Enrique Hernández (0–1)	—	35,028	56–44
101	July 25	Dodgers	7–3	**Jake Arrieta** (8–6)	Walker Buehler (4–3)	**Seranthony Domínguez** (10)	35,659	57–44
102	July 26	@ Reds	9–4	**Ranger Suárez** (1–0)	Michael Lorenzen (1–1)	—	17,031	58–44
103	July 27	@ Reds	4–6	David Hernandez (4–0)	**Nick Pivetta** (6–9)	Raisel Iglesias (20)	24,776	58–45
104	July 28	@ Reds	2–6	Wandy Peralta (2–2)	**Tommy Hunter** (2–1)	Jared Hughes (7)	35,249	58–46
105	July 29	@ Reds	0–4	Luis Castillo (6–8)	**Zach Eflin** (7–3)	Raisel Iglesias (21)	21,649	58–47
106	July 30	@ Red Sox	1–2 (13)	Héctor Velázquez (7–0)	**Austin Davis** (1–1)	—	37,722	58–48
107	July 31	@ Red Sox	3–1	**Jake Arrieta** (9–6)	Drew Pomeranz (1–5)	**Seranthony Domínguez** (11)	37,816	59–48

August (13–14)

#	Date	Opponent	Score	Win	Loss	Save	Attendance	Record
108	August 2	Marlins	5–2	**Tommy Hunter** (3–1)	Kyle Barraclough (0–5)	—	26,050	60–48
109	August 3	Marlins	5–1	**Vince Velasquez** (8–8)	Trevor Richards (3–6)	**Seranthony Domínguez** (12)	33,737	61–48
110	August 4	Marlins	8–3	**Zach Eflin** (8–3)	José Ureña (3–11)	—	35,194	62–48
111	August 5	Marlins	5–3	**Pat Neshek** (1–0)	Drew Steckenrider (3–2)	**Tommy Hunter** (2)	42,343	63–48
112	August 6	@ Diamondbacks	2–3 (14)	Yoshihisa Hirano (3–2)	**Austin Davis** (1–2)	—	21,131	63–49
113	August 7	@ Diamondbacks	5–2	**Nick Pivetta** (7–9)	Zack Greinke (12–7)	**Pat Neshek** (2)	22,382	64–49
114	August 8	@ Diamondbacks	0–6	Patrick Corbin (9–4)	**Vince Velasquez** (8–9)	—	23,384	64–50
115	August 10	@ Padres	0–2	Jacob Nix (1–0)	**Zach Eflin** (8–4)	Kirby Yates (4)	26,306	64–51
116	August 11	@ Padres	5–1	**Aaron Nola** (13–3)	Walker Lockett (0–3)	—	35,098	65–51
117	August 12	@ Padres	3–9	Joey Lucchesi (6–6)	**Jake Arrieta** (9–7)	—	26,930	65–52
118	August 14	Red Sox	1–2	Rick Porcello (15–5)	**Tommy Hunter** (3–2)	Craig Kimbrel (36)	33,081	65–53
119	August 15	Red Sox	7–4	**Tommy Hunter** (4–2)	Joe Kelly (4–1)	**Seranthony Domínguez** (13)	35,266	66–53
120	August 16 (1)	Mets	4–24	Corey Oswalt (2–2)	**Ranger Suárez** (1–1)	—	see 2nd game	66–54
121	August 16 (2)	Mets	9–6	**Zach Eflin** (9–4)	Steven Matz (5–10)	**Seranthony Domínguez** (14)	33,049	67–54
122	August 17	Mets	4–2	**Aaron Nola** (14–3)	Noah Syndergaard (8–3)	**Pat Neshek** (3)	40,460	68–54
123	August 18	Mets	1–3	Jacob deGrom (8–7)	**Jake Arrieta** (9–8)	—	35,158	68–55
124	August 19	Mets	2–8	Jason Vargas (3–8)	**Nick Pivetta** (7–10)	—	2,429	68–56
125	August 21	@ Nationals	4–10	Jimmy Cordero (1–0)	**Víctor Arano** (1–2)	—	24,080	68–57
126	August 22	@ Nationals	7–8	Matt Grace (1–1)	**Seranthony Domínguez** (1–4)	—	31,855	68–58
127	August 23	@ Nationals	2–0	**Aaron Nola** (15–3)	Max Scherzer (16–6)	**Pat Neshek** (4)	29,475	69–58
128	August 24	@ Blue Jays	2–4	Ryan Borucki (3–3)	**Jake Arrieta** (9–9)	Ken Giles (17)	26,292	69–59
129	August 25	@ Blue Jays	6–8	Joe Biagini (2–7)	**Seranthony Domínguez** (1–5)	Ken Giles (18)	33,127	69–60
130	August 26	@ Blue Jays	8–3	**Vince Velasquez** (9–9)	Marco Estrada (7–10)	—	28,209	70–60
131	August 27	Nationals	3–5	Stephen Strasburg (7–7)	**Zach Eflin** (9–5)	Justin Miller (1)	21,261	70–61
132	August 28	Nationals	4–5	Koda Glover (1–2)	**Pat Neshek** (1–1)	Greg Holland (1)	21,083	70–62
133	August 29	Nationals	8–6	**Seranthony Domínguez** (2–5)	Jimmy Cordero (1–1)	**Tommy Hunter** (3)	22,525	71–62
134	August 31	Cubs	2–1 (10)	**Pat Neshek** (2–1)	Steve Cishek (4–2)	—	22,556	72–62

September (8–20)

#	Date	Opponent	Score	Win	Loss	Save	Attendance	Record
135	September 1	Cubs	1–7	Kyle Hendricks (11–10)	**Zach Eflin** (9–6)	—	33,040	72–63
136	September 2	Cubs	1–8	Jon Lester (15–5)	**Aaron Nola** (15–4)	—	36,517	72–64
137	September 3	@ Marlins	1–3	José Ureña (5–12)	**Vince Velasquez** (9–10)	Drew Steckenrider (3)	7,771	72–65
138	September 4	@ Marlins	9–4	**Jake Arrieta** (10–9)	Trevor Richards (3–8)	—	7,131	73–65
139	September 5	@ Marlins	1–2	Sandy Alcántara (2–0)	**Nick Pivetta** (7–11)	Drew Steckenrider (4)	6,427	73–66
140	September 7	@ Mets	4–3	**Aaron Nola** (16–4)	Tyler Bashlor (0–3)	**Tommy Hunter** (4)	23,379	74–66
141	September 8	@ Mets	5–10	Noah Syndergaard (11–3)	**Zach Eflin** (9–7)	—	25,094	74–67
142	September 9	@ Mets	4–6	Drew Gagnon (1–1)	**Vince Velasquez** (9–11)	Seth Lugo (2)	24,153	74–68
—	September 10	Nationals	Postponed (wet grounds) Makeup: September 11 as a single-admission doubleheader					
143	September 11 (1)	Nationals	1–3	Erick Fedde (2–3)	**Nick Pivetta** (7–12)	Sean Doolittle (23)	see 2nd game	74–69
144	September 11 (2)	Nationals	6–7 (10)	Wander Suero (3–0)	**Yacksel Ríos** (3–2)	Greg Holland (3)	19,630	74–70
145	September 12	Nationals	1–5	Stephen Strasburg (8–7)	**Aaron Nola** (16–5)	—	20,258	74–71
146	September 14	Marlins	14–2	**Zach Eflin** (10–7)	Wei-Yin Chen (6–11)	—	21,671	75–71
147	September 15	Marlins	5–4	**Luis García** (3–1)	Drew Rucinski (4–2)	**Pat Neshek** (5)	24,695	76–71
148	September 16	Marlins	4–6	José Ureña (7–12)	**Nick Pivetta** (7–13)	—	30,040	76–72
149	September 17	Mets	4–9	Zack Wheeler (12–7)	**Tommy Hunter** (4–3)	—	21,767	76–73
150	September 18	Mets	5–2	**Pat Neshek** (3–1)	Drew Smith (1–1)	**Héctor Neris** (11)	18,895	77–73
151	September 19	Mets	4–0	**Zach Eflin** (11–7)	Noah Syndergaard (12–4)	—	19,085	78–73
152	September 20	@ Braves	3–8	Jesse Biddle (6–1)	**Tommy Hunter** (4–4)	—	27,474	78–74
153	September 21	@ Braves	5–6	Jonny Venters (5–1)	**Pat Neshek** (3–2)	A. J. Minter (15)	34,370	78–75
154	September 22	@ Braves	3–5	Mike Foltynewicz (12–10)	**Jake Arrieta** (10–10)	Arodys Vizcaíno (16)	35,616	78–76
155	September 23	@ Braves	1–2	Aníbal Sánchez (17–6)	**Aaron Nola** (16–6)	Shane Carle (1)	34,214	78–77
156	September 24	@ Rockies	1–10	Jon Gray (12–8)	**Zach Eflin** (11–8)	—	30,366	78–78
157	September 25	@ Rockies	3–10	D. J. Johnson (1–0)	**Vince Velasquez** (9–12)	—	30,217	78–79
158	September 26	@ Rockies	0–14	Germán Márquez (14–10)	**Nick Pivetta** (7–14)	—	35,181	78–80
159	September 27	@ Rockies	3–5	Scott Oberg (8–1)	**Jake Arrieta** (10–11)	Wade Davis (42)	36,448	78–81
160	September 28	Braves	2–10	Mike Foltynewicz (13–10)	**Jerad Eickhoff** (0–1)	—	24,306	78–82
161	September 29	Braves	3–0	**Aaron Nola** (17–6)	Jonny Venters (5–2)	**Seranthony Domínguez** (15)	30,886	79–82
162	September 30	Braves	3–1	**Tommy Hunter** (5–4)	Kevin Gausman (10–11)	**Seranthony Domínguez** (16)	34,202	80–82

== Roster ==
All players who made an appearance for the Phillies during 2018 are included.

2018 Philadelphia Phillies
Roster
Pitchers: 63 Drew Anderson; 64 Víctor Arano; 49 Jake Arrieta; 70 Luis Avilán; 52 Zac Curtis; 54 Austin Davis; 51 Enyel De Los Santos; 58 Seranthony Domínguez; 56 Zach Eflin; 48 Jerad Eickhoff; 57 Luis García; 40,96 Tommy Hunter; 33 Drew Hutchison; 31 Mark Leiter; 19 Ben Lively; 47 Aaron Loup; 55 Hoby Milner; 46 Adam Morgan; 50 Héctor Neris; 93 Pat Neshek; 27 Aaron Nola; 43 Nick Pivetta; 61 Edubray Ramos; 53 Yacksel Ríos; 55 Ranger Suárez; 44 Jake Thompson; 28 Vince Velasquez	Catchers: 38 Jorge Alfaro; 15 Andrew Knapp; 40 Wilson Ramos; Infielders: 33 Justin Bour; 13 Asdrúbal Cabrera; 2 J. P. Crawford; 18 Pedro Florimón; 7 Maikel Franco; 16 César Hernández; 4 Scott Kingery; 10 Trevor Plouffe; 41 Carlos Santana; 9 Jesmuel Valentín; 29 Mitch Walding	Outfielders: 23 Aaron Altherr; 12,19 José Bautista; 25 Dylan Cozens; 37 Odúbel Herrera; 17 Rhys Hoskins; 24 Roman Quinn; 5 Nick Williams	Manager: 22 Gabe Kapler; Coaches: 81 Craig Driver (bullpen catcher); 3 José David Flores (first base); 35 Jim Gott (bullpen); 88 Pedro Guerrero (assistant hitting); 39 Rick Kranitz (pitching); 8 John Mallee (hitting); 82 Bob Stumpo (bullpen catcher); 59 Rob Thomson (bench); 62 Dusty Wathan (third base); 45 Chris Young (assistant pitching)

== Player stats ==
=== Batting ===
Note: G = Games played; AB = At bats; R = Runs; H = Hits; 2B = Doubles; 3B = Triples; HR = Home runs; RBI = Runs batted in; SB = Stolen bases; BB = Walks; AVG = Batting average; SLG = Slugging average

Player	G	AB	R	H	2B	3B	HR	RBI	SB	BB	AVG	SLG
César Hernández	161	605	91	153	15	3	15	60	19	95	.253	.362
Carlos Santana	161	560	82	128	28	2	24	86	2	110	.229	.414
Rhys Hoskins	153	558	89	137	38	0	34	96	5	87	.246	.496
Odúbel Herrera	148	550	64	140	19	3	22	71	5	38	.255	.420
Scott Kingery	147	452	55	102	23	2	8	35	10	24	.226	.338
Maikel Franco	131	433	48	117	17	1	22	68	1	29	.270	.467
Nick Williams	140	407	53	104	12	3	17	50	3	32	.256	.425
Jorge Alfaro	108	344	35	90	16	2	10	37	3	18	.262	.407
Aaron Altherr	105	243	28	44	11	1	8	38	3	36	.181	.333
Andrew Knapp	84	187	19	37	6	2	4	15	1	24	.198	.316
Asdrúbal Cabrera	49	171	20	39	13	0	5	17	0	12	.228	.392
Roman Quinn	50	131	13	34	6	4	2	12	10	10	.260	.412
J. P. Crawford	49	117	17	25	6	3	3	12	2	13	.214	.393
Wilson Ramos	33	89	9	30	8	1	1	17	0	10	.337	.483
Jesmuel Valentín	46	79	8	14	5	1	1	6	0	8	.177	.304
Pedro Florimón	50	71	13	16	6	1	2	5	1	5	.225	.423
Justin Bour	29	49	6	11	3	0	1	5	1	4	.224	.347
José Bautista	27	45	12	11	4	0	2	6	2	11	.244	.467
Dylan Cozens	26	38	2	6	2	0	1	2	1	6	.158	.289
Mitch Walding	13	17	1	1	0	0	1	2	0	2	.059	.235
Trevor Plouffe	7	12	1	3	0	0	1	3	0	0	.250	.500
Pitcher totals	162	266	11	28	3	1	2	10	0	8	.105	.147
Team totals	162	5424	677	1270	241	30	186	653	69	582	.234	.393

=== Pitching ===
Note: W = Wins; L = Losses; ERA = Earned run average; G = Games pitched; GS = Games started; SV = Saves; IP = Innings pitched; H = Hits allowed; R = Runs allowed; ER = Earned runs allowed; BB = Walks allowed; SO = Strikeouts

Player	W	L	ERA	G	GS	SV	IP	H	R	ER	BB	SO
Aaron Nola	17	6	2.37	33	33	0	212.1	149	57	56	58	224
Jake Arrieta	10	11	3.96	31	31	0	172.2	165	93	76	57	138
Nick Pivetta	7	14	4.77	33	32	0	164.0	163	91	87	51	188
Vince Velasquez	9	12	4.85	31	30	0	146.2	138	83	79	59	161
Zach Eflin	11	8	4.36	24	24	0	128.0	130	69	62	37	123
Tommy Hunter	5	4	3.80	65	0	4	64.0	65	28	27	15	51
Victor Arano	1	2	2.73	60	0	3	59.1	54	19	18	17	60
Seranthony Dominguez	2	5	2.95	53	0	16	58.0	32	19	19	22	74
Adam Morgan	0	2	3.83	67	0	1	49.1	49	25	21	22	50
Héctor Neris	1	3	5.10	53	0	11	47.2	46	27	27	16	76
Luis García	3	1	6.07	59	0	1	46.0	49	31	31	18	51
Edubray Ramos	3	1	2.32	52	0	1	42.2	34	14	11	15	42
Yacksel Ríos	3	2	6.75	36	0	0	36.0	43	28	27	15	36
Austin Davis	1	2	4.15	32	0	0	34.2	35	20	16	12	38
Pat Neshek	3	2	2.59	30	0	5	24.1	23	9	7	5	15
Ben Lively	0	2	6.85	5	5	0	23.2	34	18	18	10	22
Drew Hutchison	1	1	4.64	11	0	0	21.1	21	11	11	13	19
Enyel De Los Santos	1	0	4.74	7	2	0	19.0	19	10	10	8	15
Mark Leiter Jr.	0	1	5.40	12	0	0	16.2	22	17	10	8	13
Jake Thompson	1	0	4.96	9	0	2	16.1	14	10	9	11	14
Ranger Suárez	1	1	5.40	4	3	0	15.0	21	14	9	6	11
Drew Anderson	0	1	4.97	5	1	0	12.2	17	7	7	2	11
Zac Curtis	0	0	1.86	7	0	0	9.2	6	2	2	10	10
Luis Avilán	0	0	3.18	12	0	0	5.2	4	2	2	4	5
Jerad Eickhoff	0	1	6.75	3	1	0	5.1	10	4	4	0	11
Hoby Milner	0	0	7.71	10	0	0	4.2	6	4	4	3	4
Aaron Loup	0	0	4.50	9	0	0	4.0	4	2	2	1	2
Pedro Florimón	0	0	9.00	2	0	0	2.0	1	2	2	1	0
Roman Quinn	0	0	37.80	1	0	0	1.2	6	7	7	2	0
Scott Kingery	0	0	13.50	1	0	0	1.1	4	2	2	0	0
Jesmuel Valentin	0	0	27.00	1	0	0	1.0	2	3	3	2	1
Team totals	80	82	4.14	162	162	44	1445.2	1366	728	665	500	1465

== Farm system ==
Level	Team	League	Manager
AAA	Lehigh Valley IronPigs	International League	Gary Jones
AA	Reading Fightin Phils	Eastern League	Greg Legg
A-Advanced	Clearwater Threshers	Florida State League	Shawn Williams
A	Lakewood BlueClaws	South Atlantic League	Marty Malloy
A-Short Season	Williamsport Crosscutters	New York–Penn League	Pat Borders
Rookie	GCL Phillies	Gulf Coast League	Roly de Armas
Rookie	DSL Phillies	Dominican Summer League	Waner Santana

== See also ==
- 2018 MLB Little League Classic
- 1964 Philadelphia Phillies season
