= Valentin (surname) =

Valentin or Valentín is a surname. Notable people with the surname include:

- Barbara Valentin (1940–2002), Austrian actress
- Dave Valentin (1952–2017), American Latin jazz flautist
- Isabelle Valentin (born 1962), French politician
- Javier Valentín (born 1975), Puerto Rican baseball player
- Jesmuel Valentín (born 1994), Puerto Rican baseball player
- José Valentín (born 1969), Puerto Rican baseball player
- Katy Valentin (1902-1970), Danish stage and film actress
- Lydia Valentín (born 1985), Spanish Olympic weightlifter
- Rodolfo Valentin (born 1944), Argentine hairdresser
