= Walding (surname) =

Walding is a surname. Notable people with the surname include:

- Jim Walding (1937–2007), Canadian politician
- Joe Walding (1926–1985), New Zealand politician
- Mitch Walding (born 1992), American baseball player
