= Jonah Cox =

American baseball player (born 2001)

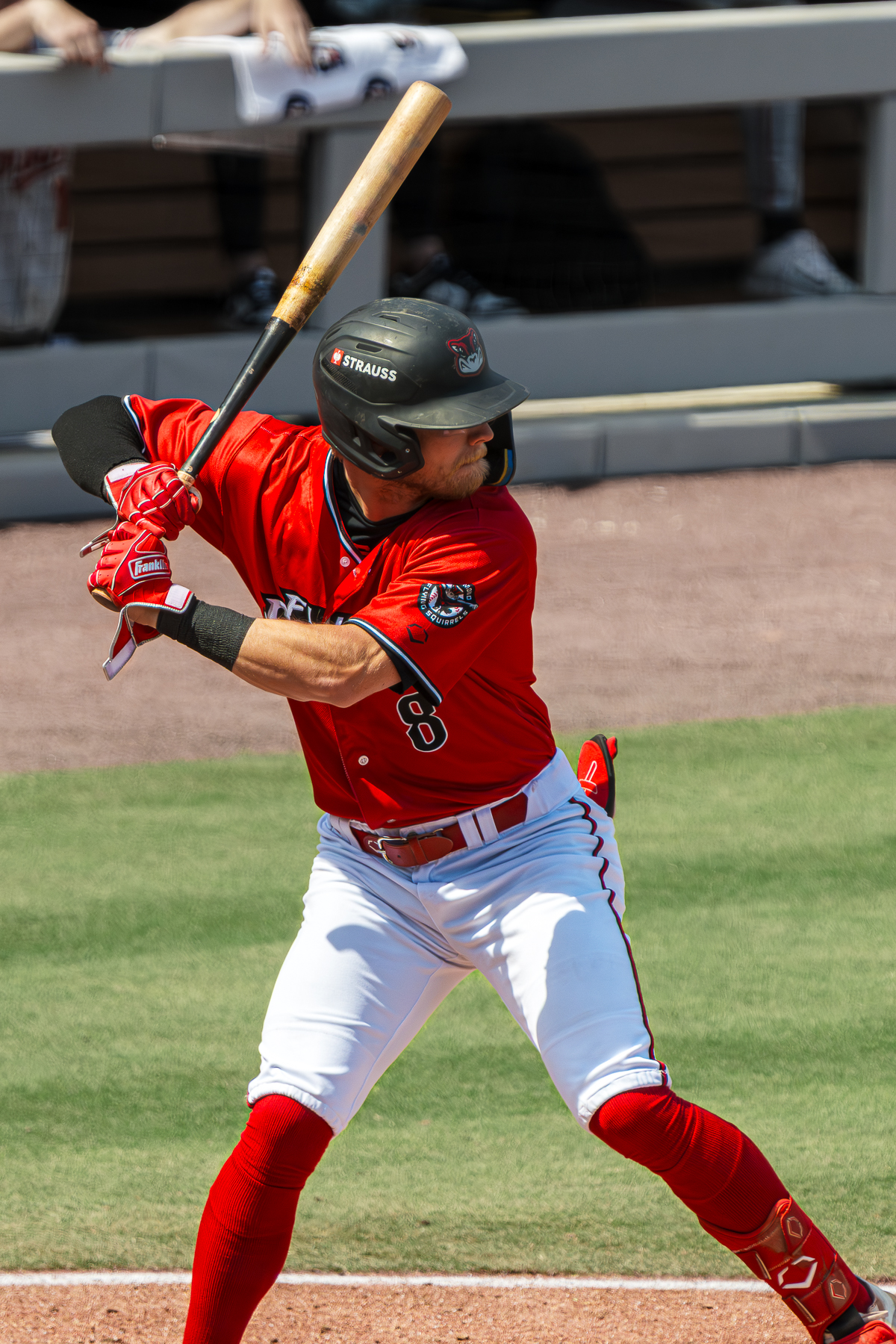
- Cox with the Richmond Flying Squirrels in 2026

San Francisco Giants – No. 53
- Outfielder
- Born: August 4, 2001 (age 25); Louisville, Colorado, U.S.
- Bats: Right Throws: Right

MLB debut
- May 31, 2026, for the San Francisco Giants

MLB statistics (through September 18, 2026)
- Batting average: .295
- Home runs: 4
- Runs batted in: 14
- Stats at Baseball Reference

Teams
- San Francisco Giants (2026–present)

Jonah Abbott Cox (born August 4, 2001) is an American professional baseball outfielder for the San Francisco Giants of Major League Baseball (MLB). He made his MLB debut in 2026.

== Amateur career ==
Cox attended Flatirons Academy in Westminster, Colorado and played college baseball at Butler Community College, Eastern Oklahoma State College and Oral Roberts University. With Oral Roberts in 2023, he had a 47-game hitting streak, which was tied for the third highest in NCAA history.

== Professional career ==
The Oakland Athletics selected Cox in the sixth round of the 2023 Major League Baseball draft. He spent his first professional season with the Arizona Complex League Athletics and Stockton Ports.

On February 2, 2024, the Athletics traded Cox to the San Francisco Giants for Ross Stripling and cash. He played 2024 with the San Jose Giants and Eugene Emeralds and 2025 with Eugene. Cox started 2026 with the Richmond Flying Squirrels.

On May 31, 2026, Cox was promoted to the major leagues for the first time. He made his major league debut later that day as a pinch-runner, scoring from first base on a single from Rafael Devers and recording his first major league hit off of Colorado Rockies catcher Brett Sullivan. On June 5, Cox hit his first career home run off of Carson Kelly of the Chicago Cubs; in doing so, he became the first player to record his first career hit and home run off of position players since Mitch Walding in 2018.

== Personal life ==
His father, Darron Cox, played in Major League Baseball.
