= Saint Valentin =

Saint Valentin, St. Valentin or Saint-Valentin may refer to:

- Sankt Valentin, a town in Austria
- Saint-Valentin, Quebec, a municipality in Canada
- Saint-Valentin, a commune in France
- St. Valentin, Kiedrich, a church in Germany
- St. Valentin, an Austrian wine grape otherwise known as Roter Veltliner

== See also ==
- Saint Valentine
- Valentin (disambiguation)
- San Valentino (disambiguation)
