= Yacksel Ríos =

Puerto Rican baseball player (born 1993)

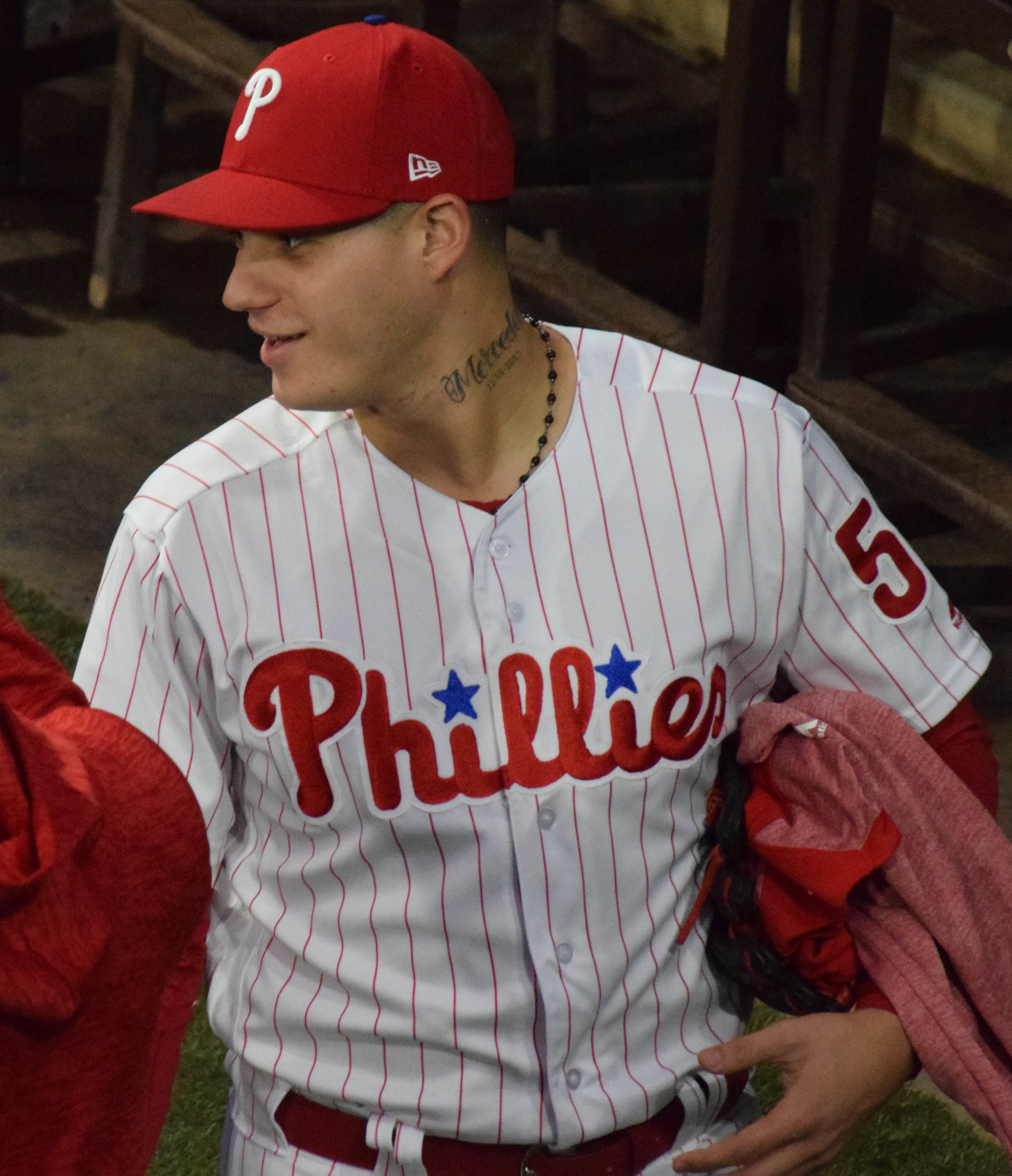
- Ríos with the Philadelphia Phillies in 2018

Free agent
- Pitcher
- Born: June 27, 1993 (age 33); Caguas, Puerto Rico
- Bats: Right Throws: Right

Professional debut
- MLB: August 22, 2017, for the Philadelphia Phillies
- KBO: June 10, 2026, for the LG Twins

MLB statistics (through April 26, 2026)
- Win–loss record: 8–2
- Earned run average: 6.21
- Strikeouts: 95

KBO statistics (through 2026 season)
- Win–loss record: 1–2
- Earned run average: 3.63
- Strikeouts: 17
- Stats at Baseball Reference

Teams
- Philadelphia Phillies (2017–2019); Pittsburgh Pirates (2019–2020); Seattle Mariners (2021); Boston Red Sox (2021); Oakland Athletics (2023); Chicago Cubs (2026); LG Twins (2026)

Yacksel Ríos Melendez (Note: Yacksel is pronounced with a leading J-sound; see voiced palatal affricate.) (born June 27, 1993) is a Puerto Rican professional baseball pitcher who is a free agent. He has previously played in Major League Baseball (MLB) for the Philadelphia Phillies, Pittsburgh Pirates, Seattle Mariners, Boston Red Sox, Oakland Athletics, and Chicago Cubs. He has also played in the KBO League for the LG Twins. The Phillies selected him in 12th round of the 2011 MLB draft.

== Career ==
=== Philadelphia Phillies ===
Ríos was born in Caguas, Puerto Rico, and attended Doctora Conchita Cuevas High School in Gurabo, Puerto Rico. The Philadelphia Phillies selected Ríos in the 12th round of the 2011 Major League Baseball draft. He made his professional debut later that year, with the Gulf Coast League Phillies where he pitched to a 0–1 record, and 8.47 ERA, in 11 1/3 innings. Ríos returned to the GCL in 2012, where he was 2–2 with a 6.60 ERA in 30 innings pitched. In 2013, he played for the Williamsport Crosscutters, where he was 5–3 with a 3.59 ERA in 15 games (including 10 games started). The 2014 season found Ríos pitching for the Lakewood BlueClaws, where he compiled a 6–2 record and 3.69 ERA in 102 1/3 innings pitched.

Ríos spent 2015 with the Clearwater Threshers, where he was 6–5, with a 2.75 ERA, in 26 games (10 starts). The next year, 2016, again found him with Clearwater, the GCL Phillies, and the Reading Fightin Phils, where he was a combined 5–4, with a 5.74 ERA, in 37 games (seven starts). Ríos began 2017 with Reading, then finished that year with the Phillies’ Triple-A farm team, the Lehigh Valley IronPigs; over 37 total minor league appearances that year, he was 1–3, with a 1.92 ERA, with 64 strikeouts, in 56 1/3 innings.

On August 22, 2017, the Phillies promoted Ríos to the major leagues. He made his MLB debut that same day, pitching 1 2/3 innings of no-hit baseball against the Miami Marlins. On September 27, Ríos earned his first career win, pitching in relief against the Washington Nationals. He spent the rest of the 2017 season with the Phillies and in 13 games he was 1–0 with a 4.41 ERA. For the 2018 Phillies, Ríos was 3–2, with a 6.75 ERA, in 36 innings pitched. With Lehigh Valley, he was 0–0 with a 3.97 ERA in 22 2/3 innings in which he walked 17 batters and struck out 26 batters. In 2019 with the Phillies, he went 0–0 with a 13.50 ERA in 2 2/3 innings over four games. With the Triple-A Lehigh Valley IronPigs, he was 1–3 with a 7.41 ERA in 34 innings in which he walked 22 batters and struck out 37 batters. He was designated for assignment on July 29, 2019.

=== Pittsburgh Pirates ===
On August 3, 2019, Ríos was claimed off waivers by the Pittsburgh Pirates. Pitching for the Indianapolis Indians in 2019 he was 0–0 with one save and a 2.35 ERA in nine games (15 1/3 innings). Pitching for the Pirates he was 1–0 with a 5.23 ERA in 10 games (10 1/3 innings). On June 28, 2020, Ríos was outrighted off of the 40-man roster. On August 3, Ríos was selected to the active roster. In three games with Pittsburgh, he pitched to a 9.00 ERA. On October 30, he was again outrighted. He elected free agency that day.

=== Tampa Bay Rays ===
On January 21, 2021, Ríos signed a minor league contract with the Tampa Bay Rays organization and was invited to spring training. In 12 games for the Triple-A Durham Bulls, Ríos recorded a 0.66 ERA with 17 strikeouts.

=== Seattle Mariners ===
On June 4, 2021, Ríos was traded to the Seattle Mariners in exchange for cash considerations. The next day, his contract was selected to the active roster. Ríos logged a 9.00 ERA in three appearances for Seattle before being designated for assignment on June 11.

=== Boston Red Sox ===
On June 14, 2021, Ríos was traded to the Boston Red Sox in exchange for cash considerations. He made his Red Sox debut on June 16, retiring the one batter he faced and earning a win in relief against the Atlanta Braves. He appeared in 20 games with Boston, all in relief, compiling a 3.70 ERA. On September 23, Ríos was designated for assignment by the Red Sox. He cleared waivers and was sent outright to the Triple-A Worcester Red Sox on September 26.

=== Chicago White Sox ===
On December 6, 2021, Ríos signed a minor league contract with the Chicago White Sox. He spent the 2022 season with the Triple-A Charlotte Knights, recording a 4–3 record and 4.91 ERA with 38 strikeouts in 33.0 innings pitched. On August 7, 2022, Ríos was released.

=== Atlanta Braves ===
On January 6, 2023, Ríos signed a minor league contract with the Atlanta Braves organization. In 21 appearances for the Triple–A Gwinnett Stripers, Ríos logged a pristine 1.46 ERA with 30 strikeouts and 7 saves across 24 2/3 innings.

=== Oakland Athletics ===
On June 18, 2023, Ríos was traded to the Oakland Athletics in exchange for cash considerations. Two days later, Oakland selected Ríos to their major league roster. After three games for Oakland, he was placed on the injured list on June 30 after being diagnosed with Raynaud syndrome.

Ríos underwent surgery to address the syndrome on July 7, and was transferred to the 60-day injured list the following day. On July 17, Ríos underwent season–ending surgery to repair an axillary branch aneurysm in his right shoulder. On October 4, Ríos was removed from the 40–man roster and sent outright to the Triple–A Las Vegas Aviators. On October 6, Ríos elected free agency.

=== New York Mets ===
On January 10, 2024, Ríos signed a minor league contract with the New York Mets. He made 27 appearances for the Triple-A Syracuse Mets, compiling a 3-1 record and 3.30 ERA with 30 strikeouts and three saves over 30 innings of work.

In 2025, Ríos made four appearances for Syracuse, the Single-A St. Lucie Mets, and rookie-level Florida Complex League Mets, accumulating an 18.00 ERA with three strikeouts across three innings pitched. He elected free agency following the season on November 6, 2025.

=== Chicago Cubs ===
On January 17, 2026, Ríos signed a minor league contract with the Chicago Cubs. On April 26, the Cubs selected Ríos' contract, adding him to their active roster. He made one appearance for the team, tossing a scoreless 1 2/3 innings against the Los Angeles Dodgers that day. On May 3, Ríos was designated for assignment by the Cubs. He cleared waivers and was sent outright to the Triple-A Iowa Cubs on May 6. Ríos was released by the Cubs organization on June 1.

=== LG Twins ===
On June 2, 2026, Ríos signed with the LG Twins of the KBO League. He made 14 appearances for the Twins, posting a 1–2 record and 3.63 ERA with 17 strikeouts and two saves across 17 2/3 innings pitched. Ríos was released by the team on July 21, in anticipation of another foreign player signing (later revealed to be Carlos Carrasco).

== International career ==
During the 2023 World Baseball Classic (WBC), Ríos pitched for the Puerto Rico national team. On March 13, 2023, he pitched in relief versus Israel and retired every batter faced over after José De León tossed 5 2/3 perfect innings. Edwin Díaz, and Duane Underwood Jr. each relieved De León and retired every batter faced, and Martín Maldonado caught on the way to a 10–0 win. The contest ended when Maldonado scored on a walk-off hit in the bottom of the eighth inning that invoked the tournament's mercy rule. However, it did not qualify as an official perfect game per the Elias Sports Bureau, due to lasting fewer than nine innings.
