= Darron Cox =

American baseball player (born 1967)

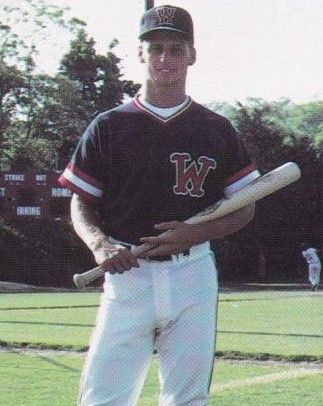
- Catcher
- Born: November 21, 1967; Oklahoma City, Oklahoma, U.S.
- Batted: Right Threw: Right

MLB debut
- April 6, 1999, for the Montreal Expos

Last MLB appearance
- June 26, 1999, for the Montreal Expos

MLB statistics
- Games: 15
- At bats: 25
- Hits: 6
- Stats at Baseball Reference

Teams
- Montreal Expos (1999)

James Darron Cox (born November 21, 1967) is an American former Major League Baseball catcher who played 15 games for the Montreal Expos in the 1999 season.

== Biography ==
A native of Oklahoma City, Oklahoma, Cox attended Mustang High School and the University of Oklahoma. In 1987, he played collegiate summer baseball with the Harwich Mariners of the Cape Cod Baseball League, and returned to the league the following season when he was named a league all-star for the Wareham Gatemen.

Cox was selected by the Cincinnati Reds in the fifth round of the 1989 MLB draft. After spending several seasons in the minor leagues, he signed with the Montreal Expos as a free agent in 1999. In his lone major league season, Cox posted six hits in 25 at-bats, with one home run and two RBIs over 15 games for Montreal.

Cox’s son, Jonah, is currently an outfielder in the San Francisco Giants organization.
