= San Valentino =

San Valentino (Italian for "Saint Valentine") may refer to:

- San Valentino in Abruzzo Citeriore, a municipality in the Province of Pescara, Abruzzo
- San Valentino Torio, a municipality in the Province of Salerno, Campania
- San Valentino, Sorano, a hamlet of Sorano (GR), Tuscany
- San Valentino alla Muta, a hamlet of Graun im Vinschgau (BZ), Trentino-South Tyrol
- San Valentino della Collina, a hamlet of Marsciano (PG), Umbria
