= Javier Valentín =

Puerto Rican baseball player (born 1975)

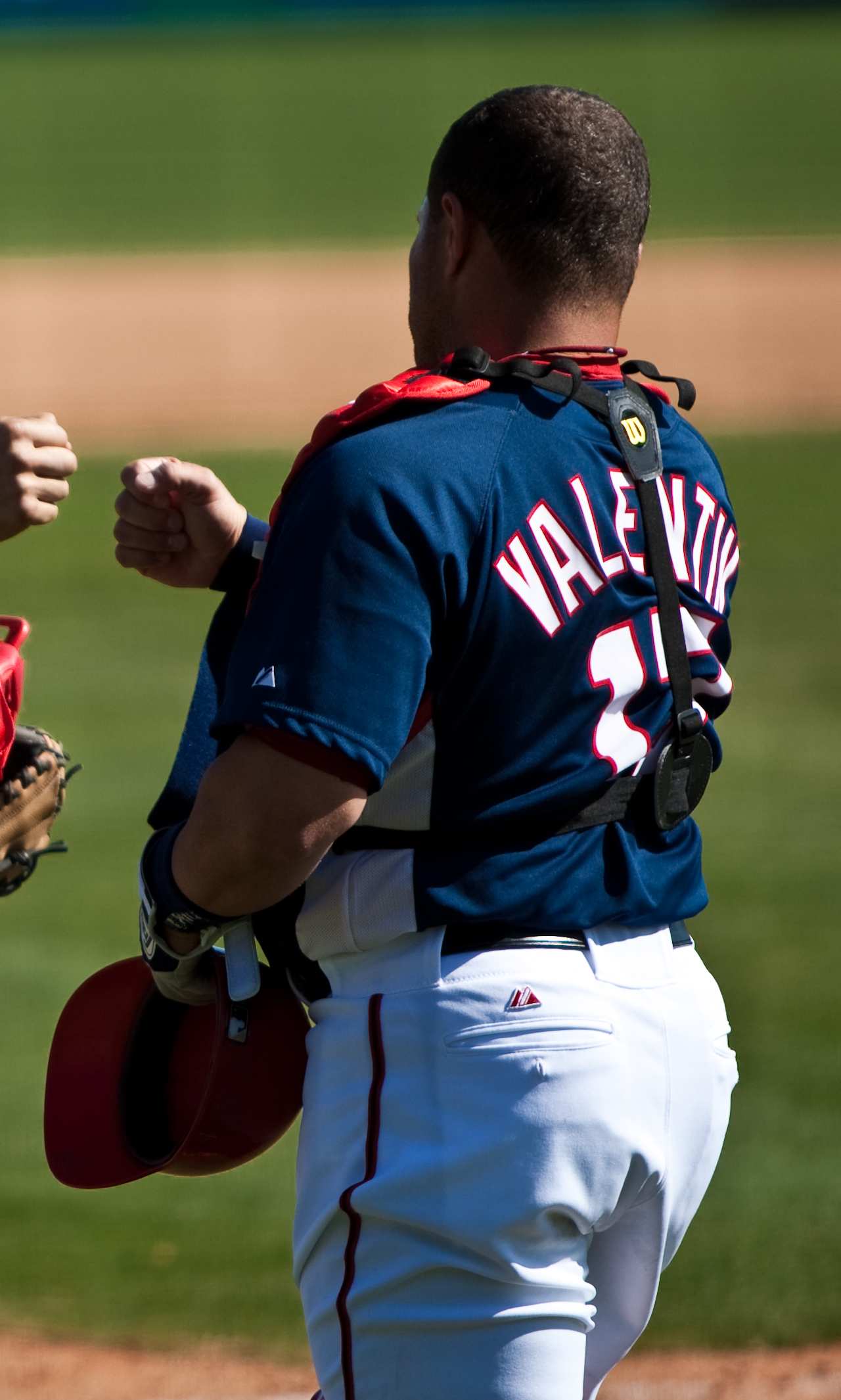
- Valentín as a non-roster invitee of the Washington Nationals in 2009 spring training.
- Catcher / Coach / Manager
- Born: September 19, 1975 (age 51); Manatí, Puerto Rico
- Batted: Switch Threw: Right

MLB debut
- September 13, 1997, for the Minnesota Twins

Last MLB appearance
- September 28, 2008, for the Cincinnati Reds

MLB statistics
- Batting average: .251
- Home runs: 45
- Runs batted in: 210
- Stats at Baseball Reference

Teams
- Minnesota Twins (1997–1999, 2002); Tampa Bay Devil Rays (2003); Cincinnati Reds (2004–2008)

José Javier Valentín Rosario (born September 19, 1975) is a Puerto Rican former professional baseball catcher. From 2004-2008, he played for the Cincinnati Reds after playing with the Tampa Bay Devil Rays (2003) and four brief stints for the Minnesota Twins from 1997-2002. In 2005, he hit .281 with a career-high 14 home runs as a backup catcher for the Reds. He is a switch-hitter. Valentín played briefly at first base and even more infrequently at third base in his time with Cincinnati.

== Playing career ==
=== Minnesota Twins ===
Valentín was drafted on June 3, 1993, by the Minnesota Twins in the third round (93rd overall) of the 1993 Major League Baseball draft. He made his major league debut on September 13, 1997, and ended up playing three seasons for the Twins.

=== Tampa Bay Devil Rays ===
On November 15, 2002, the Twins traded Valentín and Matt Kinney to the Milwaukee Brewers in exchange for minor league prospects Gerry Oakes and Matt Yeatman. On March 24, 2003, the Brewers sent Valentín to the Tampa Bay Devil Rays in exchange for Jason Conti. He made 49 appearances for the Devil Rays during the season, batting .222/.254/.356 with three home runs and 15 RBI.

=== Cincinnati Reds ===
Valentín signed with the Cincinnati Reds on January 8, 2004. He made 82 appearances for Cincinnati on the year, slashing .233/.293/.381 with six home runs and 20 RBI.

Valentín played in 76 contests for the Reds during the 2005 season, slashing .281/.362/.520 with career-highs in home runs (14) and RBI (50).

Valentín played in 92 games for Cincinnati in 2006, hitting .269/.313/.441 with eight home runs and 27 RBI. He made another 97 appearances for the team during the 2007 campaign, batting .276/.328/.387 with two home runs and 34 RBI. On October 31, 2007, the Reds exercised Valentín's $1.35 million option, preventing him from reaching free agency.

Valentín made 94 appearances for Cincinnati during the 2008 season, slashing .256/.326/.411 with four home runs and 18 RBI. During his five-year stint with the Reds, Valentín operated mainly as a back-up catcher and a specialized pinch hitter.

=== New York Mets ===
On February 3, 2009, Valentín signed a minor league contract with the Washington Nationals to battle with Wil Nieves to be Washington's backup catcher. However, on March 28, he was reassigned to minor league camp, declined his assignment, and opted to become a free agent.

On May 14, 2009, Valentín signed a minor league contract with the New York Mets. In 23 appearances for the Triple-A Buffalo Bisons, he batted .260/.360/.416 with three home runs and 10 RBI. Valentín was released by the Mets organization on June 22.

== Coaching career ==
On December 19, 2018, Valentín was hired by the Minnesota Twins to serve as the hitting coach for their Triple-A affiliate, the Rochester Red Wings.

On July 23, 2026, Valentín was named as the manager for the Guerreros de Oaxaca of the Mexican League following the firing of Roberto Vizcarra. He was not retained following the 2026 season.

== Personal life ==
Valentín is the younger brother of former Major League Baseball second baseman José Valentín and the uncle of former Philadelphia Phillies infielder Jesmuel Valentín.

== See also ==
- List of Major League Baseball players from Puerto Rico
