= Vince Velasquez =

Mexican-American baseball player (born 1992)

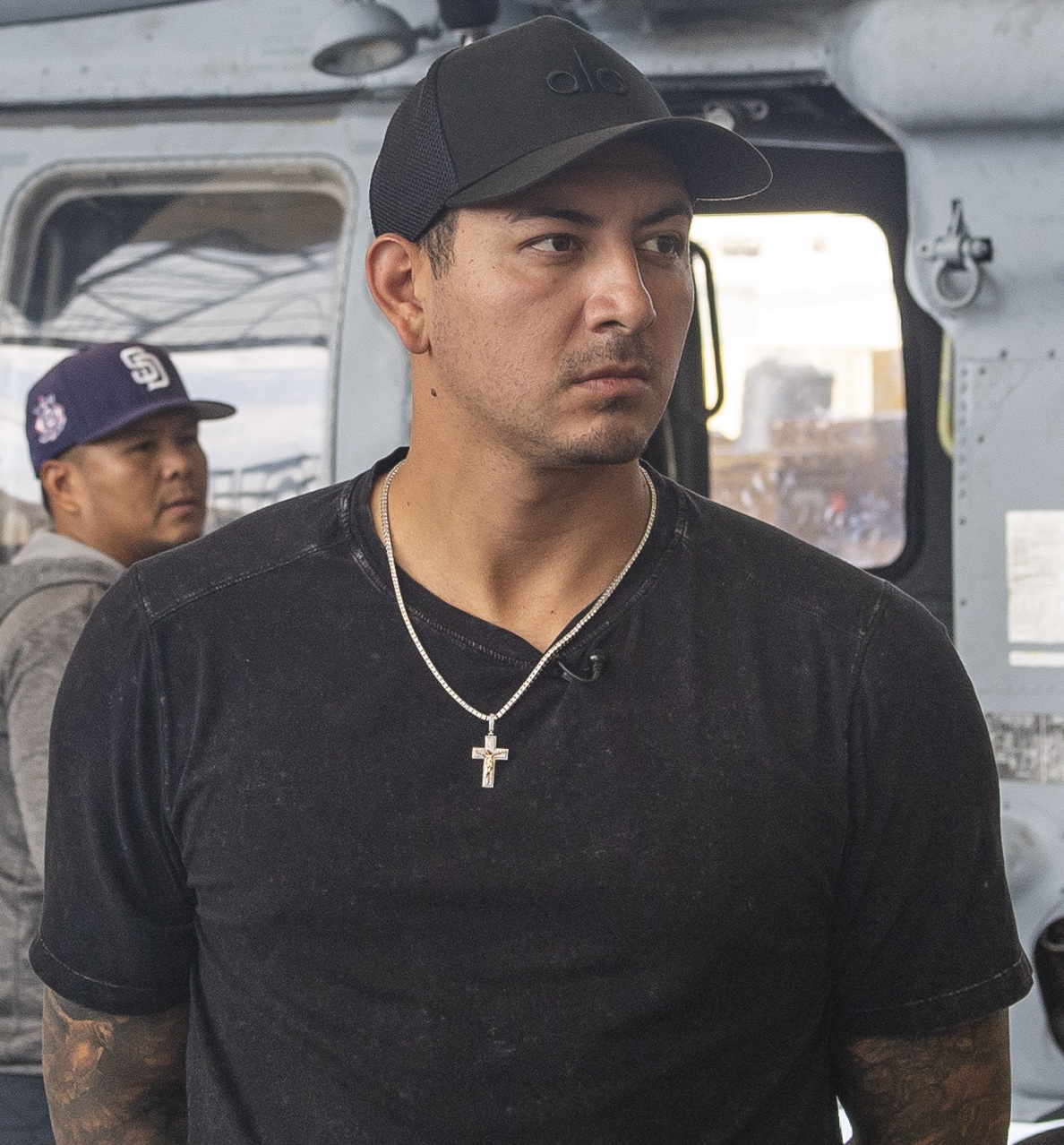
- Velasquez in 2023

Kansas City Royals
- Pitcher
- Born: June 7, 1992 (age 34); Montclair, California, U.S.
- Bats: Right Throws: Right

Professional debut
- MLB: June 10, 2015, for the Houston Astros
- KBO: August 13, 2025, for the Lotte Giants

MLB statistics (through 2026 season)
- Win–loss record: 38–51
- Earned run average: 4.86
- Strikeouts: 823

KBO statistics (through 2025 season)
- Win–loss record: 1–4
- Earned run average: 8.23
- Strikeouts: 28
- Stats at Baseball Reference

Teams
- Houston Astros (2015); Philadelphia Phillies (2016–2021); San Diego Padres (2021); Chicago White Sox (2022); Pittsburgh Pirates (2023); Lotte Giants (2025); Chicago Cubs (2026)

Vincent John Velasquez (/vəˈlɑːskɛz/ veh-LAS-kehz; born June 7, 1992) is an American professional baseball pitcher in the Kansas City Royals organization. He has previously played in Major League Baseball (MLB) for the Houston Astros, Philadelphia Phillies, San Diego Padres, Chicago White Sox, Pittsburgh Pirates, and Chicago Cubs and in the KBO League for the Lotte Giants.

Born in Montclair, California, Velasquez was a multi-sport athlete at Garey High School in Pomona. After bone spurs in his right elbow kept him from pitching and playing shortstop, he learned how to field left-handed. A growth spurt prior to his senior year of high school caused him to draw interest from the soccer and gridiron football teams, but Velasquez opted to focus on baseball on the advice of a scout for the Chicago White Sox. The Astros selected him in the second round of the 2010 MLB draft, and Velasquez chose to pitch for them rather than honor his commitment to play college baseball as a shortstop for Cal State Fullerton. He was assigned to the Greeneville Astros in 2010, but underwent Tommy John surgery later that year and did not return to the field until 2012. He had a successful season with the Quad Cities River Bandits in 2013, but struggles during a three-game stretch with the Lancaster JetHawks inspired him to sharpen his curveball. The following year, he helped take the JetHawks to a California League championship title.

Velasquez made his major league debut in 2015, replacing Roberto Hernández in the starting rotation after the latter was moved to the bullpen. Velasquez played one season with the Astros before he was traded to the Phillies as part of a major trade that brought Ken Giles to Houston. He had a strong debut for the team, striking out 25 batters in his first two games, but the next few seasons were hindered by injury, including a season-ending finger injury in 2017. By 2020, Velasquez's inconsistent performance had placed his role on the Phillies roster in question, and he took advantage of the MLB's pause to diversify his pitch repertoire and improve his efficacy against batters. Since then, he has alternated between starting games and relief appearances, depending on the needs of the team. The Phillies released him in September 2021 and he finished the season with the Padres before signing with the White Sox before the 2022 season.

== Early life ==
Velasquez was born on June 7, 1992, in Montclair, California. His father Leonard worked as a package delivery driver for the United Parcel Service (UPS), though he sometimes worked four jobs at once to provide for Velasquez and his brothers. Vince's mother Juanita, meanwhile, worked as a hospital billing supervisor. In addition to playing as a shortstop and pitcher for the Garey High School baseball team in Pomona, California, Velasquez served as the quarterback for the school gridiron football team. As a sophomore, Velasquez developed bone spurs in his right elbow, which made it impossible to pitch or play in the infield. Inspired by the story of Billy Wagner, who became a left-handed pitcher after breaking his right arm as a child, Velasquez became a center fielder and learned how to throw left-handed. Between his junior and senior season, Velasquez underwent a growth spurt that took him from 5 feet 8 inches (1.73 m) to 6 feet 1 inch (1.85 m), and the school soccer team expressed interest in making him a center midfielder. A scout for the Chicago White Sox dissuaded Velasquez from pursuing other sports, warning him that an injury in football or soccer would compromise his baseball career.

As a junior in 2009, Velasquez was named the Garey High School Most Valuable Player. On the mound, he posted a 6–1 win–loss record, with a 1.89 earned run average (ERA); at the plate, he batted .608 with 14 doubles, 29 runs batted in (RBIs), and 18 stolen bases. Velasquez pitched his first complete game on May 21, 2010, against the San Dimas High School Saints, the reigning California Interscholastic Federation (CIF) Southern Section division champions. He struck out 17 batters in the 9–1 victory, striking out every batter he faced at least once, and held the Saints to three hits, two walks, and one unearned run. Less than a week later, Velasquez was named to the 2010 Inland Valley High School All-Star game.

== Professional career ==
=== Houston Astros ===
==== Minor leagues ====
The Houston Astros of Major League Baseball (MLB) selected Velasquez in the second round, 58th overall, of the 2010 MLB draft. At the time, he had already committed to play college baseball as a shortstop for Cal State Fullerton, but he chose to sign with the Astros after the team indicated that they would prefer him as a pitcher. Velasquez signed with the team on June 22, 2010, the day after his high school graduation, and was assigned to the Rookie Greeneville Astros of the Appalachian League. Velasquez pitched in eight games during his rookie season, including six starts. He posted a 2–2 record and a 3.07 ERA in Greeneville, striking out 25 batters in 29 1/3 innings pitched.

Velasquez underwent Tommy John surgery in 2010, citing "overuse". He contemplated abandoning baseball after the injury, but was encouraged to continue by his father. Velasquez reported to spring training early in 2011, building up the strength to throw 40 feet (12 m). He missed the 2011 Minor League Baseball season entirely, instead practicing in bullpen sessions and in the Astros' instructional league. Velasquez regained his pitch velocity quickly after the surgery. His fastball speed jumped from 88–90 mph (142–145 km/h) to 90–93 mph (145–150 km/h), but it took him the season to regain control. He was assigned to the Low–A Tri-City ValleyCats in 2012, with the Astros believing that a shorter season would help Velasquez ease back into pitching. He started nine games that season, posting a 4–1 record and a 3.35 ERA while striking out 51 batters in 45 2/3 innings.

After spending the offseason building his strength and working on improving his strikeout-to-walk ratio, Velasquez began the 2013 season with the Single–A Quad Cities River Bandits. His preseason work proved successful; in his first 75 innings, Velasquez led the Midwest League with 88 strikeouts. By the time that he was promoted to the High–A Lancaster JetHawks that August, Velasquez had posted a 9–4 record with a 3.19 ERA at Quad Cities, while his 123 strikeouts in 110 innings were good enough for a league-leading 10.06 strikeouts per nine innings pitched. Velasquez stumbled in his promotion to Lancaster, however, going 0–2 with a 6.14 ERA in his three starts. He realized that, at higher levels of baseball, simply having a strong fastball was insufficient to strike out batters, and he spent the offseason working on a curveball to supplement his primary pitch.

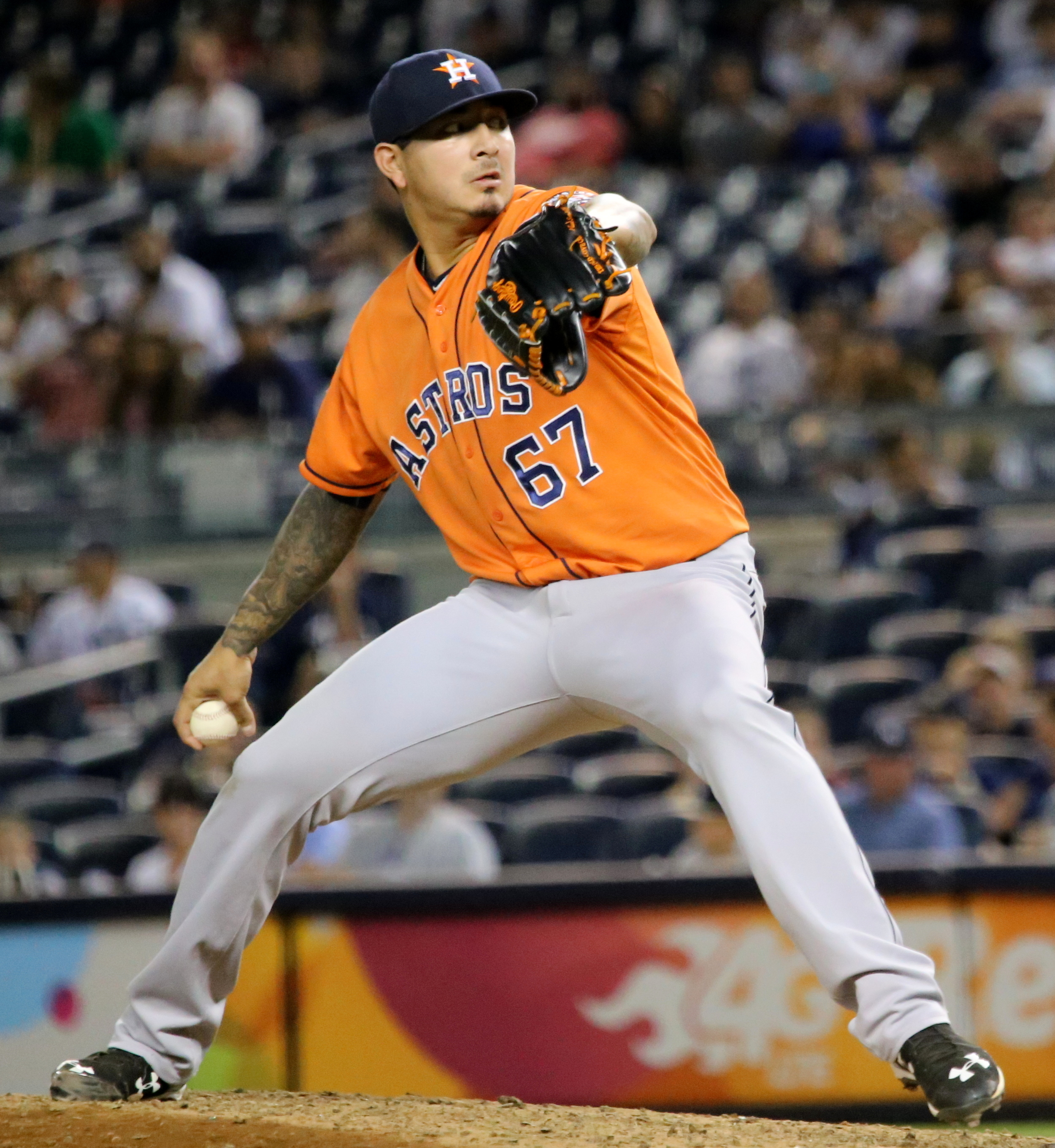
Velasquez with the Astros in 2015

Going into the 2014 season, Baseball America ranked Velasquez as the sixth-highest prospect in the Astros' farm system. He returned to Lancaster to start the season as part of an eight-man rotation that alternated between starting games and pitching in relief. Although Velasquez missed two months of the season with a groin injury, 2014 proved to be a breakout season for him. He started seven games and appeared 12 times in relief, posting a 4.37 ERA in the process. Velasquez also helped take Lancaster to the California League playoffs. Their performance in the first half of the season led to a bye for the first playoff round before they went on to sweep the Inland Empire 66ers in the South Division finals. Velasquez pitched in Game 1 of the South Division series, allowing only two hits in six innings of a 7–3 victory. He went on to start Game 3 of the championship series against the Visalia Rawhide, earning a no decision in the Jethawks' 5–4 walk-off home run win. Lancaster went on to take the California League title, their second championship in their 19-year history.

Following the 2014 season, Velasquez played in the Arizona Fall League with the Salt River Rafters. After giving up four hits and three runs in one inning, Velasquez left his final scheduled start of the season with a strained latissimus dorsi muscle. He went 2–1 with the team, with a 4.85 ERA and 12 strikeouts.

==== Major leagues ====
Prior to the 2015 season, Velasquez was promoted to the Double-A Corpus Christi Hooks. There, he went 3–0 with a 1.37 ERA in his first five starts, striking out 37 batters and allowing 15 hits in 26 1/3 innings. Meanwhile, veteran starting pitcher Roberto Hernández disappointed for the Astros, going 2–5 with a 5.18 ERA in his first 11 starts. On June 8, 2015, the Astros moved Hernández to the bullpen and called up Velasquez to take his place in the rotation. He made his major league debut on June 10, pitching five shutout innings against the Chicago White Sox before the bullpen gave up three home runs, leading the Astros to a 4–1 loss. With the acquisition of Scott Kazmir in July, the Astros moved Velasquez to the bullpen, where the shorter innings requirement improved his velocity and focus on the mound. Velasquez played in 19 games with the Astros as a rookie in 2015, starting seven games and finishing five. He posted a 1–1 record for the season, with a 4.37 ERA and 58 strikeouts in 55 2/3 innings.

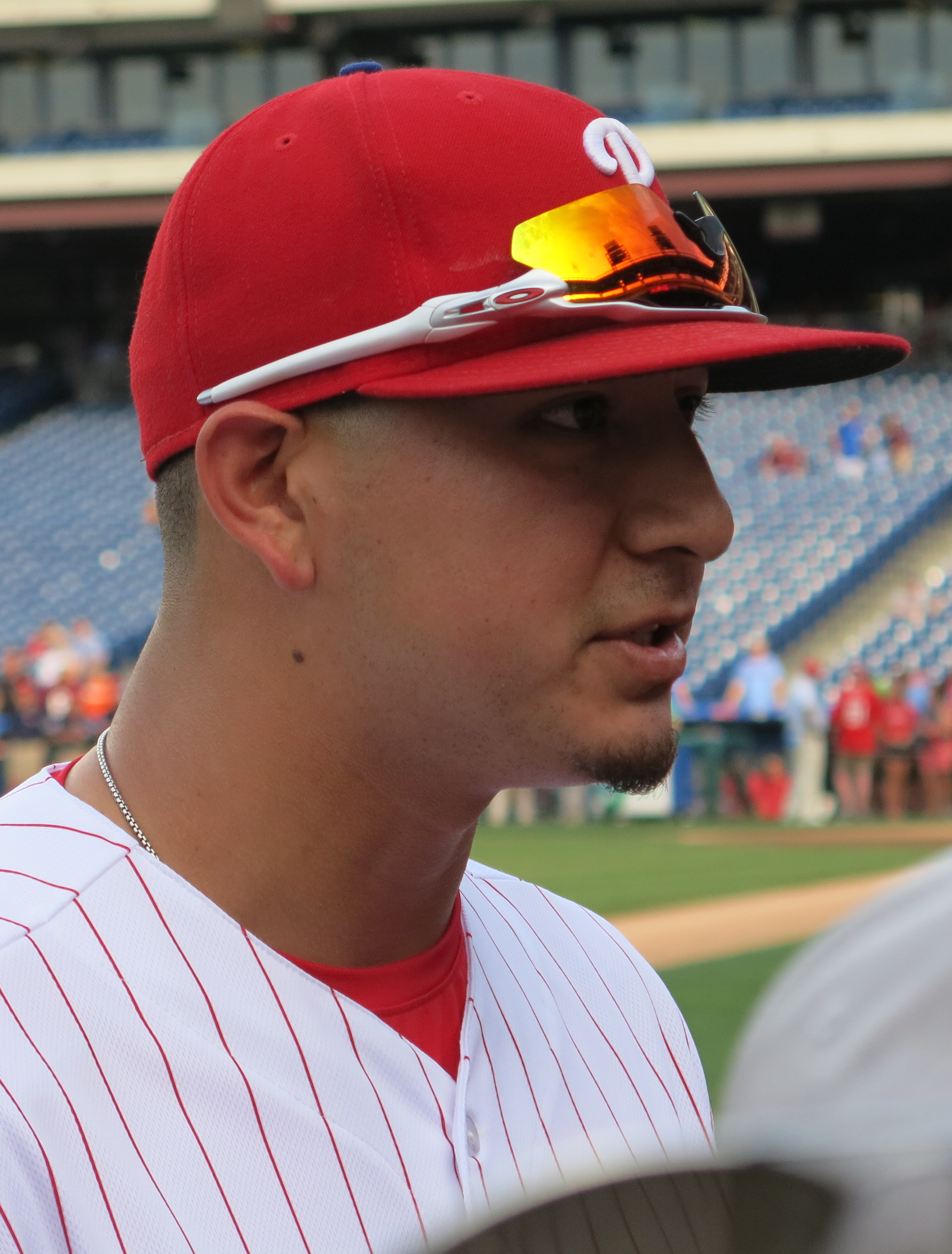
Velasquez in 2016

=== Philadelphia Phillies ===
==== 2016 ====
On December 9, 2015, Velasquez was part of a massive trade with the Philadelphia Phillies. Velasquez and fellow pitchers Mark Appel, Thomas Eshelman, Harold Arauz, and Brett Oberholtzer, were sent to Philadelphia in exchange for prospect Jonathan Arauz and closer Ken Giles. It was Matt Klentak’s first major trade as the Phillies' general manager; he used Giles as a bargaining chip to attempt a rebuild of a struggling team.

Velasquez debuted with the Phillies on April 9, 2016, pitching six shutout innings in a 1–0 win against the New York Mets. Striking out nine batters in the process, Velasquez became the first Phillies pitcher to strike out at least that many in his team debut since Roy Halladay in 2010. He continued to impress in his following start, fanning a career-high 16 batters in a 3–0 victory over the San Diego Padres. Velasquez was only the second pitcher since 2000 to pitch a shutout game with 16 or more strikeouts and zero walks; the other, Max Scherzer, struck out 17 in a no-hitter the year prior. Striking out 25 in his first two Phillies starts, Velasquez surpassed Jim Bunning, who fanned 20 in 1964, for the franchise record.

Through his first 11 starts with the Phillies, Velasquez posted a 5–2 record with a 3.67 ERA. His strong performance came to a halt on June 8, when Velasquez abruptly left after two pitches in a game against the Chicago Cubs with a strained right biceps. Velasquez was placed on the 15-day disabled list on June 10, returning to the active roster 17 days later on June 27. In his final start of 2016, Velasquez allowed three runs, two earned, in seven innings against the Atlanta Braves. The Phillies shut Velasquez down for the season on September 4, after the pitcher threw a career-high 131 innings of work in 24 starts. He went 8–6 for his rookie season, with a 4.12 ERA and 10.4 strikeouts per nine innings pitched.

==== 2017 ====
Velasquez was named to the Phillies' 2017 opening day roster as the fourth starter in a five-man rotation with Jeremy Hellickson, Jerad Eickhoff, Clay Buchholz, and Aaron Nola. In his first start of the season, Velasquez struck out 10 batters in four innings, becoming the first Phillies player of the modern era to record a double-digit number of strikeouts in four or fewer innings pitched, and the first starter to strike out 10 or more batters in the first four innings of a game since Cole Hamels in 2006. However, he had to be taken out after throwing 94 pitches in those four innings, including 25 in the first inning alone, and the Phillies ultimately lost to the Washington Nationals 7–6.

The 2017 season was hindered by injury for Velasquez. First, on May 30, he was placed on the 10-day disabled list with a right elbow flexor strain suffered in the second inning of a game against the Miami Marlins. On August 10, he exited a game 32 pitches into an ultimate 10–0 loss to the New York Mets, suffering bruising and numbness in his right middle finger. On August 22, the Phillies announced that Velasquez was suffering from restricted blood flow to the finger, and that he would be placed on the 60-day disabled list while he recovered from surgery. He made 15 starts in 2017, posting a 2–7 record and a 5.13 ERA in 72 innings.

==== 2018 ====
In 2018, Velasquez was part of an opening day rotation that was undergoing several changes: Jake Arrieta, despite being scheduled to pitch on April 8, was not officially named to the 25-man roster, while Eickhoff began the season on the injured list and Eflin was optioned to make room for Ben Lively. On June 30, a 97 mph (156 km/h) line drive off the bat of Adam Eaton hit Velasquez in his right arm, requiring the pitcher to pull off his glove and make a left-handed throw to first base. After successfully making the play, Velasquez fell to the ground in pain from the injury, and was placed on the disabled list until July 11. The line drive incident came in the middle of a successful stretch for Velasquez, who boasted a 2.38 ERA and held his opponents to a .134 batting average in six starts between mid-June and mid-July, while improving his pace between pitches and his pitches per inning. As the season went on, however, Velasquez's performance became inconsistent, with high pitch counts in the early innings and worse luck against hitters. Velasquez pitched 146 2/3 innings in 2018, striking out 161 batters, and posted a 9–12 record with a 4.85 ERA in 30 starts.

==== 2019 ====
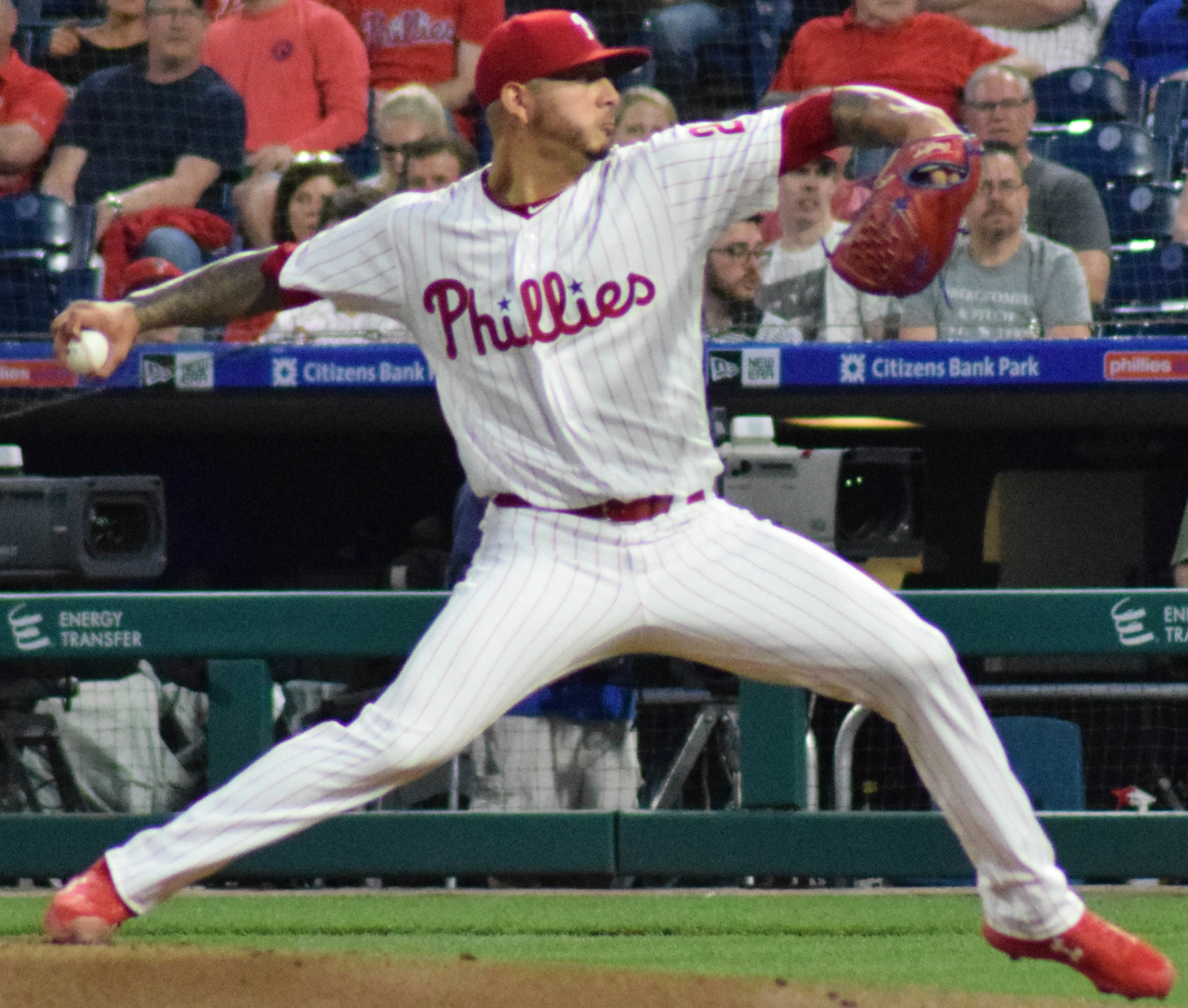
Velasquez pitching for the Phillies in 2019

On January 11, 2019, shortly before the arbitration deadline, Velasquez signed a one-year, $2.249 million contract with the team. After recording a 1.99 ERA in his first four starts, Velasquez allowed 18 base runners, four home runs, and eight runs in a span of 7 2/3 innings before he was placed on the 10-day injured list with a right forearm strain on May 11. His difficulty in keeping batters off base came to a head on May 7, when Velasquez ignored catcher J. T. Realmuto's pitch calling and proceeded to give up three home runs in a span of seven batters. The St. Louis Cardinals took the game 6–0. On June 28, Velasquez both struck out his 500th career batter and recorded his first home run as a batter, although he and the Phillies ultimately lost 6–2 to the Marlins.

On August 3, when a game against the White Sox went into the 14th inning, the understaffed Phillies placed Velasquez in left field and allowed outfielder Roman Quinn to pitch. Although the White Sox ultimately won in the 15th inning, Velasquez kept the game alive when his 94.7 mph (152.4 km/h) throw from left field to home plate successfully threw out José Abreu. It was the first time that a major league pitcher recorded an outfield assist since Ned Garver in 1950. Velasquez finished the season with a 7–8 record and a 4.91 ERA in 33 games (23 starts), as well as 130 strikeouts in 117 1/3 innings.

==== 2020 ====
Going into the 2020 season, Velasquez spent spring training in competition with Nick Pivetta for the fifth place in the Phillies' starting rotation. When the season was suspended indefinitely due to the COVID-19 pandemic, Velasquez continued to practice his pitching so that, when MLB returned to play, he could make a strong return to the mound. He undertook a series of pitching lessons with assistant coach David Lundquist over FaceTime, with particular focus on improving his efficacy against left-handed batters. When the season eventually began on July 24, both Velasquez and Pivetta were given opportunities to start, as Zach Eflin was returning from injury, while Zack Wheeler was on paternity leave following the birth of his first child. Velasquez debuted with a new pitch repertoire, adding a cutter and changeup to his mainstay fastball and curveball. He was sent to the bullpen that August, but returned to the rotation the following week to assist in a series of doubleheaders for the pandemic-shortened season. Velasquez played in nine games with the Phillies in the abbreviated 60-game season, starting in seven, and posted a 1–1 record with a 5.56 ERA in the process. That December, the Phillies tendered a one-year, $4 million contract for Velasquez to pitch in the 2021 season, shortly before the 8 p.m. arbitration deadline.

==== 2021 ====
When the Phillies signed veteran pitchers Matt Moore and Chase Anderson during the 2020–21 offseason, they were concerned that neither would be able to regularly pitch past the fifth inning. Velasquez was moved to the bullpen, where he and David Hale were asked to serve as long relievers for Moore and Anderson. After Moore was placed on the COVID-19 list, Velasquez was called to make his first start of the season on April 20, in which he gave up two runs in four innings of an eventual 5–4 walk-off loss to the Colorado Rockies. May proved to be the best streak of Velasquez's major-league career; he posted a 2.84 ERA in five starts before a numb index finger led to his last-minute scratch for a May 20 game against the Miami Marlins.

The following month, Velasquez became involved in an ongoing MLB controversy regarding pitchers' use of foreign substances to increase spin rate and pitch control. In the third inning of a June 7 game against the Washington Nationals, Velasquez lost control of a 90 mph (140 km/h) fastball, striking and accidentally fracturing the nose of opposing pitcher Austin Voth. Nationals manager Dave Martinez suggested that injuries of that sort would be more common if MLB banned the use of foreign substances that were supposed to enhance pitch grip, saying, "I understand them trying to clean some stuff up. But it's hot, it's slippery, it's sweaty. I know Velasquez didn't throw in there intentionally, but I'm afraid that if we don't come up with something unified for everybody, you'll see a lot more of that."

The Phillies moved Velasquez back to the bullpen at the trading deadline, as he failed to pitch past the fourth inning in nine of his 17 starts for the season. He went onto the injured list with a blistered finger on August 2, and was in the midst of a series of minor-league rehab assignments when he was designated for assignment by the Phillies on September 11. He was unclaimed by other MLB teams on waivers, and was subsequently released into free agency. At the time of his release, Velasquez had a 3–6 record and a 5.95 ERA in 81 2/3 innings.

=== San Diego Padres ===
On September 15, 2021, the day after his release from the Phillies, Velasquez signed a minor league deal with the San Diego Padres. The team told Velasquez that they intended to use him as a reliever, but an injury to Blake Snell left the Padres in need of an additional starting pitcher. Velasquez was called up for a start on September 17 against the St. Louis Cardinals, giving up four earned runs and taking the loss in an 8–2 defeat. He pitched 12 2/3 innings in the Padres' rotation, allowing 12 earned runs and increasing his overall 2021 ERA to 6.30 for the year. Velasquez became a free agent at the end of the season.

=== Chicago White Sox ===
On March 14, 2022, Velasquez signed a one-year, $3 million contract with the Chicago White Sox. He made 27 appearances (nine starts) for the White Sox, compiling a 3–3 record and 4.78 ERA with 69 strikeouts across 75 1/3 innings pitched.

=== Pittsburgh Pirates ===
On December 13, 2022, Velasquez signed a one-year contract with the Pittsburgh Pirates. He made 8 starts for the Pirates in 2023, registering a 4–4 record and 3.86 ERA with 37 strikeouts in 37 1/3 innings pitched. On May 28, 2023, Velasquez was placed on the injured list with right elbow inflammation. On June 9, it was announced that Velasquez would undergo season–ending surgery to repair damage to his right ulnar collateral ligament, with a recovery timetable of 11–12 months. He became a free agent following the season.

=== Cleveland Guardians ===
On February 4, 2025, Velasquez signed a minor league contract with the Cleveland Guardians that included an invitation to spring training. On April 29, the Guardians selected Velasquez's contract, adding him to their active roster. He did not pitch for Cleveland before he was designated for assignment on May 2. Velasquez cleared waivers and was sent outright to the Triple-A Columbus Clippers on May 4. He made 18 appearances for Columbus, logging a 5–4 record and 3.42 ERA with 95 strikeouts across 81 2/3 innings pitched.

=== Lotte Giants ===
On August 6, 2025, Velasquez signed with the Lotte Giants of the KBO League. In 11 appearances (seven starts) for the Giants, he struggled to a 1–4 record and 8.23 ERA with 28 strikeouts over 35 innings of work. Velasquez became a free agent following the season.

=== Chicago Cubs ===
On February 3, 2026, Velasquez signed a minor league contract with the Chicago Cubs. He was assigned to the Triple-A Iowa Cubs to begin the regular season. On April 24, the Cubs selected Velasquez's contract, adding him to their active roster. He made his team debut in relief against the Los Angeles Dodgers during that day's game. Velasquez was designated for assignment by Chicago the following day. On April 28, he cleared waivers and was sent outright to Triple-A Iowa. However, two days later, Velasquez rejected the assignment and elected free agency. He re-signed with the Cubs on a new minor league contract on May 4. On June 24, Chicago added Velasquez back to their active roster. He recorded a scoreless inning in an appearance against the Milwaukee Brewers on June 27, and was designated for assignment by the Cubs the following day. On June 30, after clearing waivers, Velasquez elected free agency.

=== Kansas City Royals ===
On July 10, 2026, Velasquez signed a minor league contract with the Kansas City Royals. In 12 games (10 starts) with Triple-A Omaha Storm Chasers he threw 52.1 innings going 2-2 with a 6.36 ERA and 45 strikeouts. He elected free agency on November 2.

On November 17, 2026, Velasquez re-signed with the Royals on a minor league contract.

== Pitcher profile ==
Throughout his pitching career, Velasquez has relied heavily on a four-seam fastball with an average speed of 93.5 mph (150.5 km/h), paired with a slider. Together, those two balls made up more than 87% of pitches he threw in 2019. At the end of the season, Velasquez and manager Joe Girardi agreed that the pitcher would need to expand his repertoire and "learn to locate something away from righties and in on lefties". He has since expanded his pitches, adding a curveball and changeup while replacing his slider with a cutter.

Velasquez's major league performance has been inconsistent; in 2018, his ERA was 5.70 in his first six starts, 3.51 for the middle 11, and 8.45 in the last nine. One problem that has followed him throughout his career has been a high pitch count, which in turn limits his depth. Until the 2021 season, Velasquez had never made three or more starts in a row where he lasted five innings and held the opposing team to one run or less.

== Personal life ==
Velasquez's two older brothers, Leonard Jr. and Christopher, followed their father Leonard Sr. into the United States Marine Corps, where they served in the Iraq War.
