= José Valentín =

Puerto Rican baseball player (born 1969)

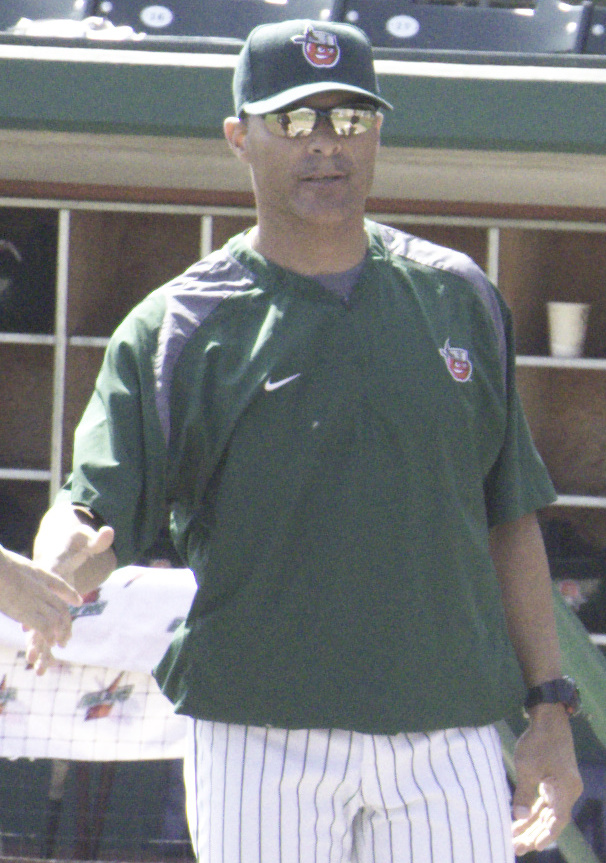
- Valentín with the Fort Wayne TinCaps in 2012

Saraperos de Saltillo
- Shortstop / Coach
- Born: October 12, 1969 (age 56); Manatí, Puerto Rico
- Batted: Switch Threw: Right

MLB debut
- September 17, 1992, for the Milwaukee Brewers

Last MLB appearance
- July 20, 2007, for the New York Mets

MLB statistics
- Batting average: .243
- Home runs: 249
- Runs batted in: 816
- Stats at Baseball Reference

Teams
- Milwaukee Brewers (1992–1999); Chicago White Sox (2000–2004); Los Angeles Dodgers (2005); New York Mets (2006–2007)

Career highlights and awards
- Milwaukee Brewers Wall of Honor
Medals
Representing Puerto Rico
Men's baseball
World Baseball Classic
Silver medal – second place	2013 San Francisco	Team
Silver medal – second place	2017 Los Angeles	Team

José Antonio Valentín (born October 12, 1969) is a Puerto Rican former professional baseball infielder who currently serves as the bench coach for the Saraperos de Saltillo of the Mexican League. He played in Major League Baseball (MLB) for the Milwaukee Brewers (1992–1999), Chicago White Sox (2000–2004), Los Angeles Dodgers (2005), and New York Mets (2006–2007).

== Baseball career ==
=== Early years ===
Valentín was signed on October 12, 1986, by the San Diego Padres as an amateur free agent. However, he was sent to the Milwaukee Brewers on March 26, 1992, with Ricky Bones and Matt Mieske in exchange for Gary Sheffield and Minor League prospect Geoff Kellogg. He made his major league debut with the Brewers on September 17, 1992. On January 12, 2000, and after eight seasons with the Brewers, he was traded with Cal Eldred to the Chicago White Sox in exchange for Jaime Navarro and John Snyder. He played five seasons with the White Sox before becoming a free agent on October 29, 2004.

=== Decline and injuries ===
As Valentín got older, however, his range in the field lessened with his foot speed. Therefore, he shifted from a strict shortstop to a player who can handle duties at third base, second base, shortstop and left field. He hit a career-high 30 home runs in 2004, but had a league-worst .216 batting average. On December 21, 2004, he was signed by the Los Angeles Dodgers. However, during spring training, he went down with torn ligaments in his left knee, and ended up with only a .170 batting average in 56 games that season after he returned, serving as a third baseman, left fielder and lefty pinch-hitter. Due to Valentin's struggles, he began to bat strictly left-handed for a time being rather than switch hitting. He would resume switch hitting later in his career. On October 27 of the same year, the Dodgers granted him free agency.

=== Resurgence with the Mets ===
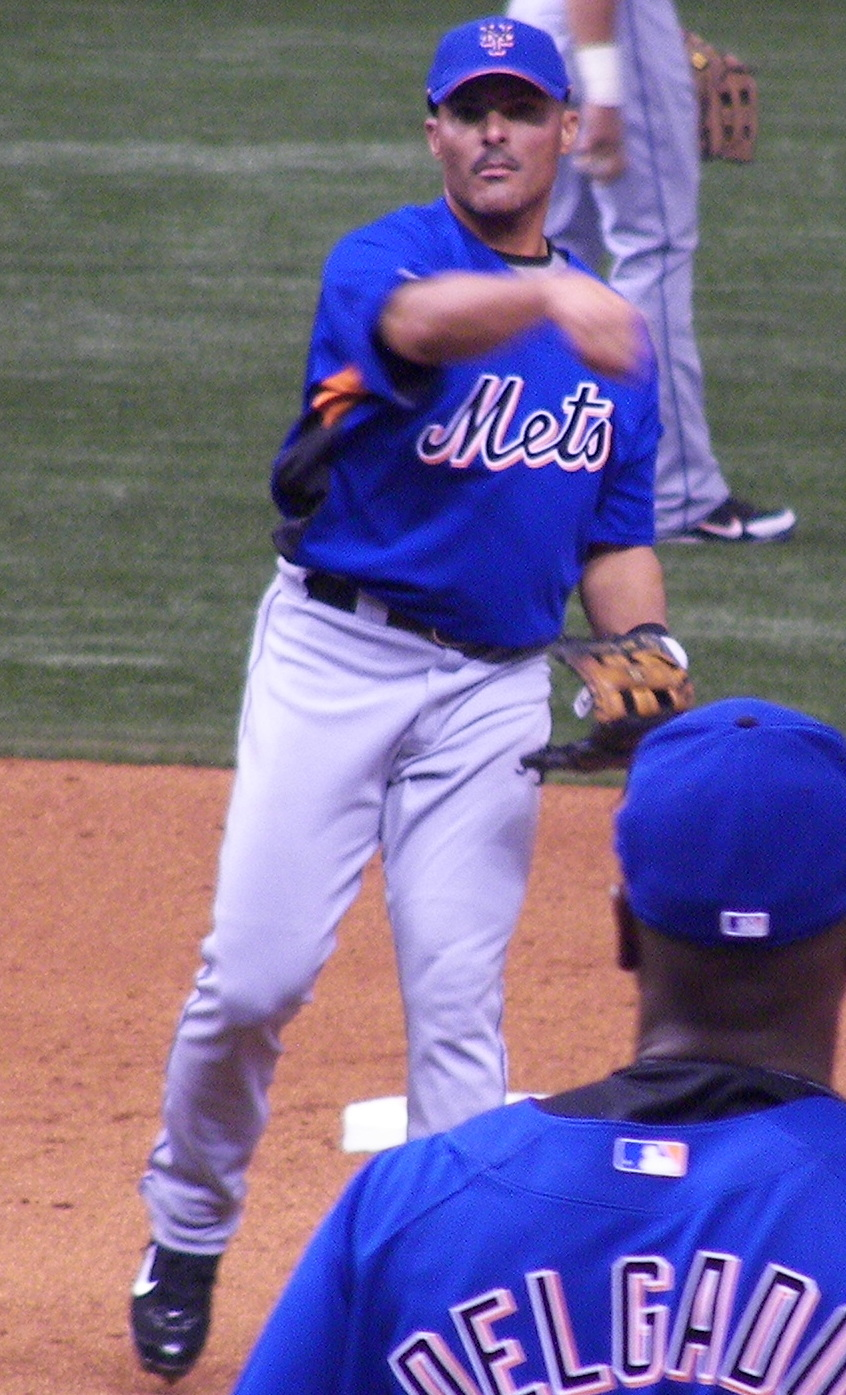
Valentín with the New York Mets in 2007

On December 12, 2005, Valentín signed with the New York Mets hoping to make the team as a utility player off the bench, but rebounded from the previous season to have one of the best seasons of his career. He emerged as one of the most solid players in the line-up, becoming the Mets regular second baseman after they traded away Kazuo Matsui. His consistent hitting played a big part in helping the Mets to the 2006 National League Eastern Division title. Valentín capped off his great regular season by hitting two home runs against the Florida Marlins on September 18, 2006, in the division-clinching game.

On November 14, 2006, Valentin re-signed with the Mets for one year, with an option for 2008. Valentín agreed to switch his uniform number from 18 to 22 for the newly signed Moisés Alou a few days later. On July 20, 2007, Valentín fouled a ball off his right leg, breaking his tibia and ending his season after 51 games and a .241 batting average. He re-signed with the Mets to a minor league contract on January 18, 2008, with an invitation to spring training. With the Triple-A New Orleans Zephyrs, Valentin told the Mets his season was over on June 21, due to physical and mental wear and tear. The Mets released him shortly thereafter. In February 2009, he re-signed with the Mets to a minor league contract; he was released after not making the team out of Spring training.

=== Major league statistics ===
Valentín had success as one of the few shortstops with good home run power, averaging 25 homers and 80 RBI over a 162-game season for his career. Although he only has a .243 lifetime batting average (the lowest average among all qualified active players), he has established a .332 lifetime on-base percentage, evidencing his propensity to walk.

== Post-playing career ==
=== Owner/Player of Santurce Crabbers ===
In 2004 it was announced that Valentín bought the Santurce Crabbers, one of the most historic professional baseball franchises of the Puerto Rico Baseball League (formerly known as LBPPR). He relocated the team to his native town, and renamed them the Manatí Atenienses. But after a decline in attendance and the restructuring of the league, Valentín moved the team back to Santurce in 2008, therefore launching the return of the Cangrejeros. He joined his home team as their second baseman becoming the only owner-player in the league.

=== Double A coach ===
In 2011, Valentín became the manager of the Mulos de Manatí team of the Puerto Rico Double A Baseball League.

=== Manager Fort Wayne Tin Caps ===
In 2012 Jose became the manager for the Fort Wayne Tin Caps baseball team which is the Class A minor league farm team of the San Diego Padres.

=== Bench coach of Leones de Ponce ===
In 2012, Valentín served as bench coach for the Leones de Ponce team of the Puerto Rico Baseball League.

=== Puerto Rican team assistant coach ===
During the 2013 World Baseball Classic, Valentín served as one of the assistant coaches under Edwin Rodríguez. He was mostly seen as a first-base coach.

=== San Diego Padres ===
After the end of the 2013 season, Valentín was promoted to the first base coach role for the San Diego Padres after bench coach Rick Renteria was hired as manager of the Chicago Cubs and former first base coach Dave Roberts became the team's bench coach.

=== Dorados de Chihuahua ===
Valentín was appointed as the manager for the Dorados de Chihuahua of the Mexican League to begin the 2025 season. On May 21, 2025, Valentín was fired and replaced by Gerónimo Gil.

=== Saraperos de Saltillo ===
On June 2, 2026, Valentín was hired to serve as the bench coach for the Saraperos de Saltillo of the Mexican League.

== Personal life ==
Valentín is married and has three children. His son, Jesmuel, played in Major League Baseball for the Philadelphia Phillies.

Valentín is the older brother of major league catcher Javier Valentín.

== See also ==
- List of Major League Baseball career home run leaders
- List of Major League Baseball players to hit for the cycle

Sporting positions
Preceded by Dave Roberts	San Diego Padres first base coach 2014–2015	Succeeded by Tarrik Brock
Achievements
Preceded by Chris Singleton	Hitting for the cycle April 27, 2000	Succeeded by Jason Kendall
