= Jesmuel Valentín =

Puerto Rican baseball player (born 1994)

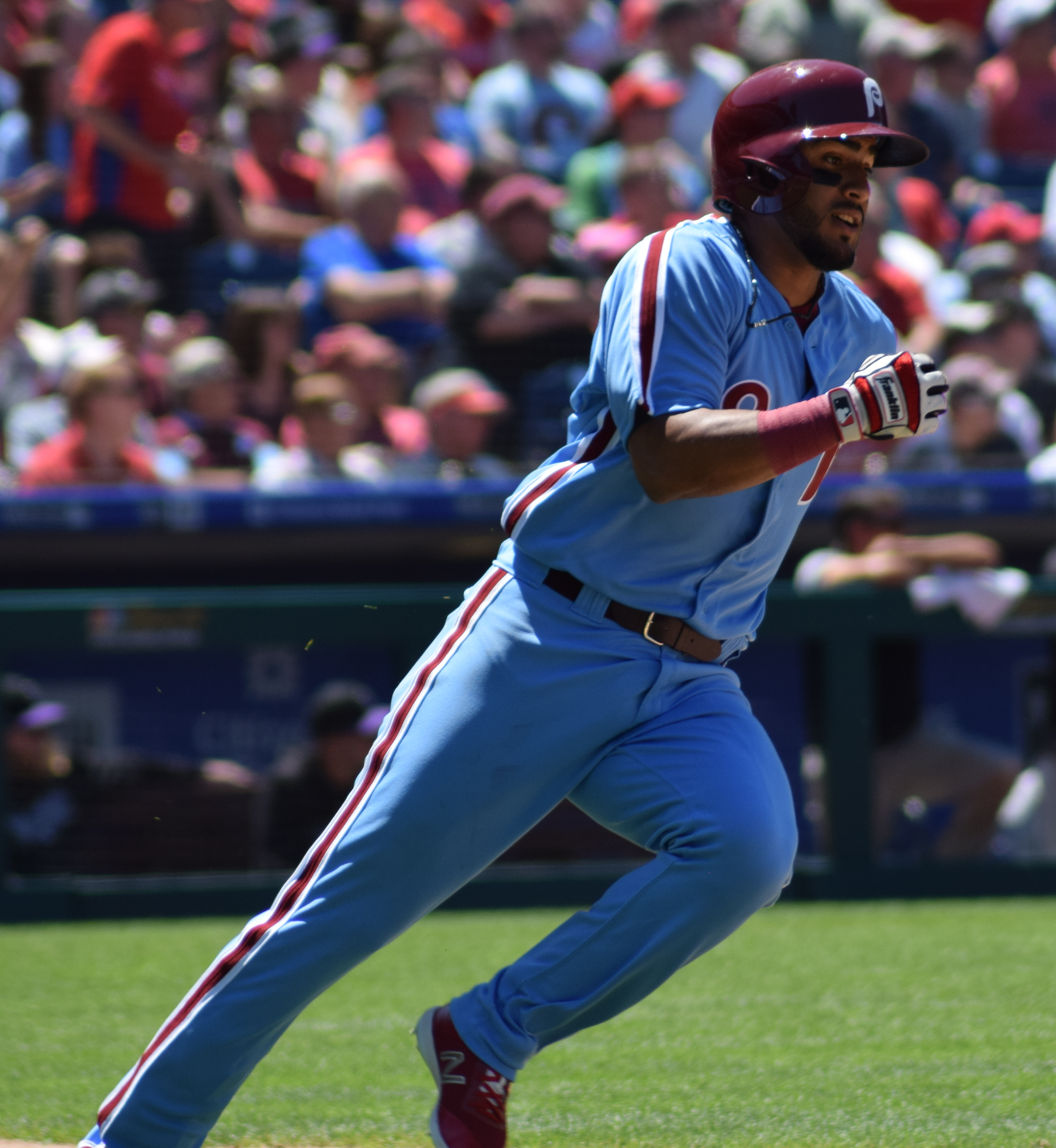
- Valentín with the Philadelphia Phillies in 2018
- Second baseman / Shortstop
- Born: May 12, 1994 (age 32); Manatí, Puerto Rico
- Batted: Switch Threw: Right

MLB debut
- April 29, 2018, for the Philadelphia Phillies

Last MLB appearance
- July 27, 2018, for the Philadelphia Phillies

MLB statistics
- Batting average: .177
- Home runs: 1
- Runs batted in: 6
- Stats at Baseball Reference

Teams
- Philadelphia Phillies (2018)

Jesmuel José Valentín (born May 12, 1994), is a Puerto Rican former professional baseball second baseman and shortstop. He played in Major League Baseball (MLB) for the Philadelphia Phillies in 2018.

== Career ==
=== Los Angeles Dodgers ===
The Los Angeles Dodgers selected Valentín in the first round of the 2012 MLB draft (51st overall) out of the Puerto Rico Baseball Academy and he signed, forgoing his commitment to play college baseball at LSU. The Dodgers assigned him to the Arizona League Dodgers to begin his professional career that year and he hit .211 with two home runs and 18 RBIs in 43 games. He split 2013 between the Great Lakes Loons and the Ogden Raptors, and he hit .264 with four home runs and 29 RBIs in 95 games. He began 2014 with Great Lakes where he hit .280 with seven home runs and 47 RBIs in 108 games.

=== Philadelphia Phillies ===
The Dodgers traded Valentín to the Philadelphia Phillies on August 16, 2014, as a player to be named later (along with Victor Arano) in a deal that sent Roberto Hernández to the Dodgers. The Phillies assigned him to the Clearwater Threshers where he batted .205 in 12 games. He began 2015 with Clearwater.

On April 11, 2015, he was placed on the restricted list and suspended indefinitely following his arrest for a domestic violence incident. The Phillies added him to their 40-man roster after the 2016 season. After he was activated off the restricted list, he returned to Clearwater, where he spent the whole season, posting a .273 batting average with one home run and 14 RBIs in 31 games. In 2016, he spent time with both the Reading Fightin Phils and the Lehigh Valley IronPigs, batting .269 with nine home runs, 52 RBIs and a .736 OPS in 125 combined games between both teams. He spent 2017 with Lehigh Valley where he batted .229 in 29 games before a separated shoulder caused him to miss the remainder of the season. He began 2018 with Lehigh Valley.

==== Major leagues ====
Valentín was promoted to the majors for the first time on April 29, 2018. He recorded his first career Major League hit on May 7 against the San Francisco Giants. He hit his first career home run and recorded his first multi-hit game on June 13 against the Colorado Rockies. Valentín made an appearance as a pitcher in during a June 15 game against the Milwaukee Brewers, surrendering three runs over one inning while recording one strikeout. He was designated for assignment on September 1. Valentín elected free agency following the season on November 2.

=== Baltimore Orioles ===
On April 11, 2019, Valentín signed with the High Point Rockers of the Atlantic League of Professional Baseball. The next day, his contract was purchased by the Baltimore Orioles organization. In 115 games for the Double–A Bowie Baysox, he hit .256/.334/.390 with 8 home runs, 46 RBI, and 10 stolen bases. Valentín did not play in a game in 2020 due to the cancellation of the minor league season because of the COVID-19 pandemic. He became a free agent following the season on November 2, 2020.

=== Québec Capitales ===
On August 24, 2023, Valentín signed with the Québec Capitales of the Frontier League. In 9 games for the team, he batted .323/.417/.387 with no home runs and five RBI.

On November 21, 2023, Valentín re-signed with the Capitales. In 65 games for Québec, he slashed .271/.383/.442 with nine home runs, 49 RBI, and nine stolen bases.

On September 23, 2024, Valentín signed with the Dorados de Chihuahua of the Mexican League. However, he did not appear for Chihuahua, and re-signed with Québec on June 10, 2025. In 61 appearances for the Capitales, Valentín slashed .297/.388/.431 with four home runs, 39 RBI, and three stolen bases.

== Personal life ==
His father, José Valentín, and uncle, Javier Valentín played in Major League Baseball. His first child, a daughter named Ximena, was born on June 25, 2018.

== See also ==
- List of second-generation Major League Baseball players
