= Víctor Arano =

Mexican baseball player (born 1995)

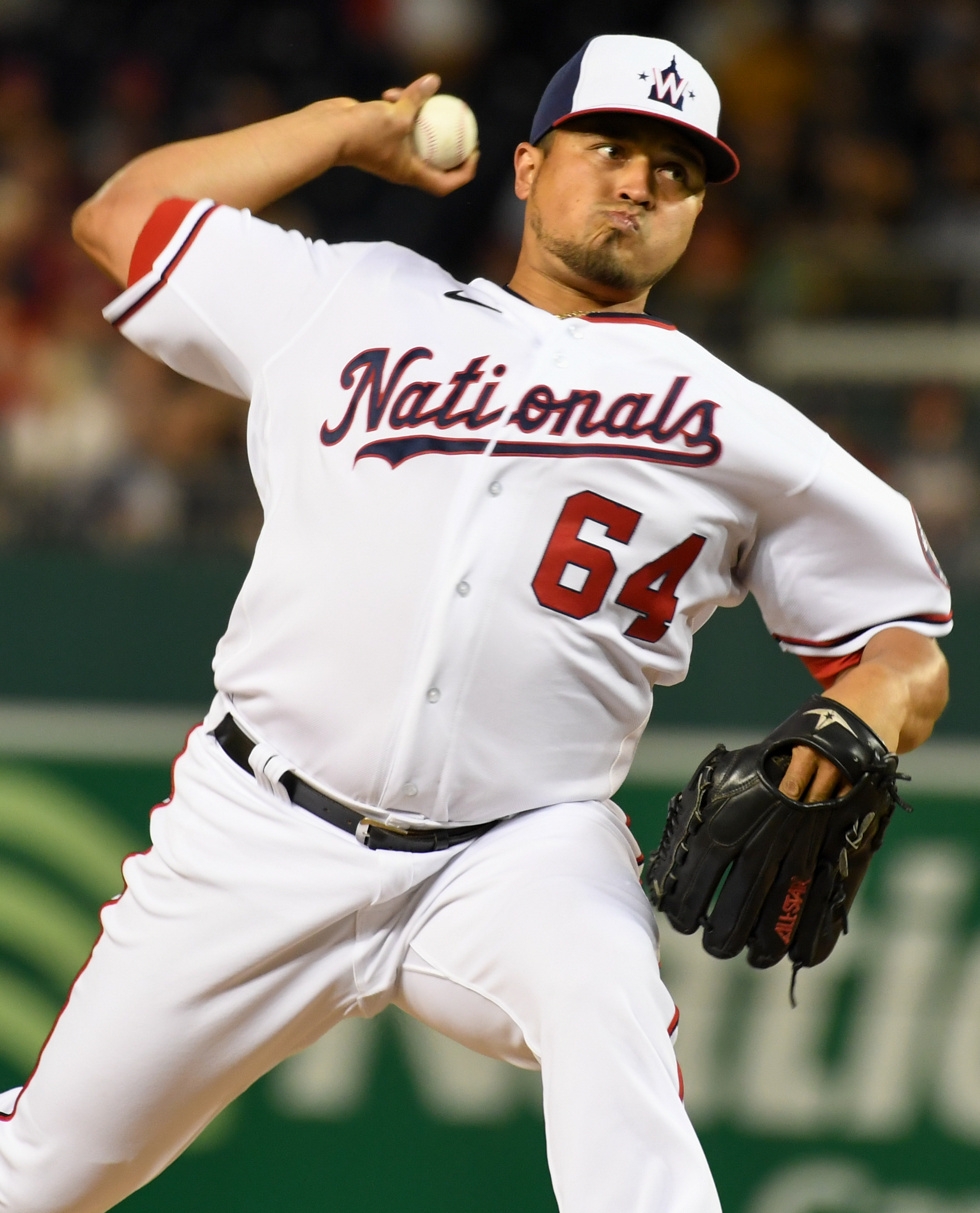
- Arano with the Washington Nationals in 2022

Free agent
- Pitcher
- Born: February 7, 1995 (age 31); Cosamaloapan, Veracruz, Mexico
- Bats: Right Throws: Right

MLB debut
- September 12, 2017, for the Philadelphia Phillies

MLB statistics (through 2022 season)
- Win–loss record: 4–3
- Earned run average: 3.32
- Strikeouts: 124
- Stats at Baseball Reference

Teams
- Philadelphia Phillies (2017–2019); Washington Nationals (2022)

Víctor Teodoro Arano Armas (born February 7, 1995) is a Mexican professional baseball pitcher who is a free agent. He has previously played in Major League Baseball (MLB) for Philadelphia Phillies and Washington Nationals.

== Career ==
=== Los Angeles Dodgers ===
Arano was born in Cosamaloapan, Veracruz, Mexico. He signed with the Los Angeles Dodgers as an international free agent in April 2013. He made his professional debut that year with the Arizona League Dodgers and spent the whole season there, going 3–2 with a 4.20 ERA in 13 games, with eight being starts. He began 2014 with the Great Lakes Loons. In 22 games (15 starts), he was 4–7 with a 4.08 ERA, and 83 strikeouts in 86 innings.

=== Philadelphia Phillies ===
On August 28, 2014, the Philadelphia Phillies acquired Arano as the player to be named later from an earlier trade for Roberto Hernández. Arano was assigned to the Clearwater Threshers but did not pitch after being acquired. In 2015, he had a 4–12 record and 4.72 ERA in 24 games (22 starts) and 69 strikeouts in 124 innings for Clearwater.

In 2016, Arano played with both Clearwater and the Reading Fightin Phils, compiling a combined 5–2 record and 2.26 ERA in 46 relief appearances, and 95 strikeouts in 79 2/3 innings. He was named an MiLB 2016 Philadelphia Organization All Star. After the 2016 season Arano pitched in the Arizona Fall League.

In 2017, Arano pitched for Reading, where he was 1–2 with a 4.19 ERA and 38 strikeouts in 38 2/3 innings in 32 appearances out of the bullpen. The Phillies selected his contract on September 12, and he made his major league debut that same night. In 10 2/3 innings pitched for the Phillies he was 1–0 with a 1.69 ERA and 13 strikeouts.

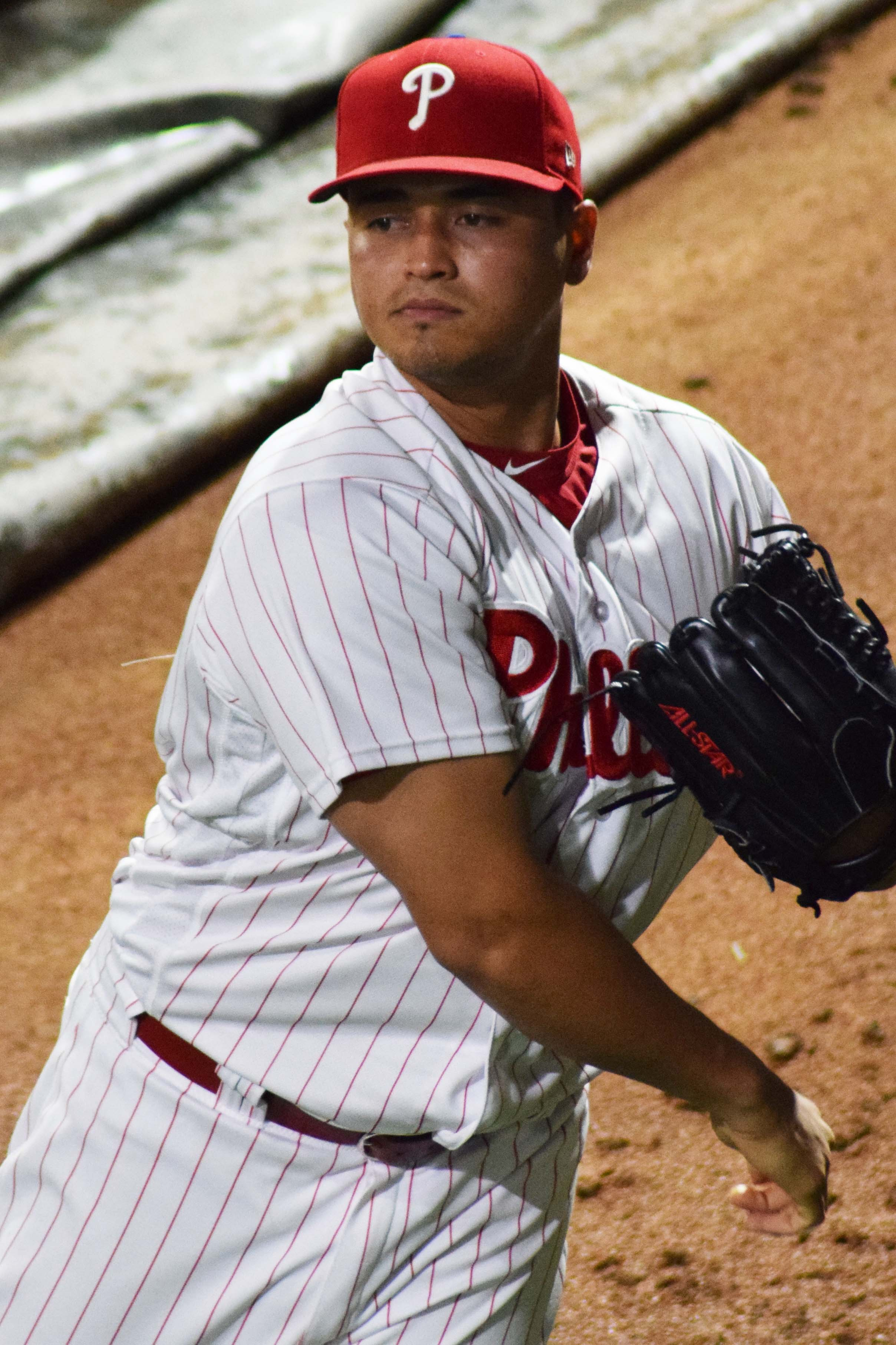
Arano with the Philadelphia Phillies in 2018

Arano began 2018 with the Phillies. He was placed on the disabled list on April 30 retroactive to April 29 and was activated on May 19. He recorded his first career save on July 4 against the Baltimore Orioles. In 2018 with the Phillies, he was 1–2 with a 2.73 ERA, and 60 strikeouts in 59 1/3 innings. He retired the first 25 batters he faced and 32 consecutive batters dating back to 2017, most by a Phillie since 1971, and held right-handed-hitters to a .207/.248/.319 slash line.

In 2019, Arano pitched in three relief appearances for the Lehigh Valley IronPigs, going 2–0 with a 0.00 ERA in four innings in which he struck out seven batters, and in three games for the Phillies, in which he was 1–0 with a 3.86 ERA in 4 2/3 innings in which he struck out seven batters. Arano missed most of the season with a right elbow injury, which eventually required arthroscopic surgery and would cause him to miss the 2020 season as well.

On January 18, 2021, Arano was designated for assignment following the acquisition of C. J. Chatham.

=== Atlanta Braves ===
On January 22, 2021, Arano was claimed off waivers by the Atlanta Braves. Arano was designated for assignment by Atlanta on June 4, without having appeared in an MLB game for the team. He was outrighted to the Triple-A Gwinnett Stripers on June 6.

=== Washington Nationals ===
On November 24, 2021, Arano signed a minor league deal with the Washington Nationals. On April 7, 2022, the Nationals selected Arano's contract, adding him to their opening day roster. He appeared in 43 games for Washington in 2022, recording a 4.50 ERA with 44 strikeouts in 42 innings pitched.

On January 13, 2023, Arano agreed to a one-year, $925K contract with the Nationals, avoiding salary arbitration. On March 30, Arano was placed on the 60-day injured list with a right shoulder strain. On June 6, it was announced that Arano would require right shoulder surgery. On October 5, Arano was removed from the 40-man roster and sent outright to Triple-A. However, Arano rejected the assignment and subsequently elected free agency.

=== Rieleros de Aguascalientes ===
On March 4, 2025, Arano signed with the Diablos Rojos del México of the Mexican League. He spent the entire year on the reserve list and did not appear in a game.

On October 10, 2025, Arano and Fernando Villalobos were traded to the Rieleros de Aguascalientes of the Mexican League. He failed to make an appearance for Aguascalientes prior to his release on April 28, 2026.

== Personal life ==
Arano has a son, born in November 2016.
