= Mitch Walding =

American baseball player (born 1992)

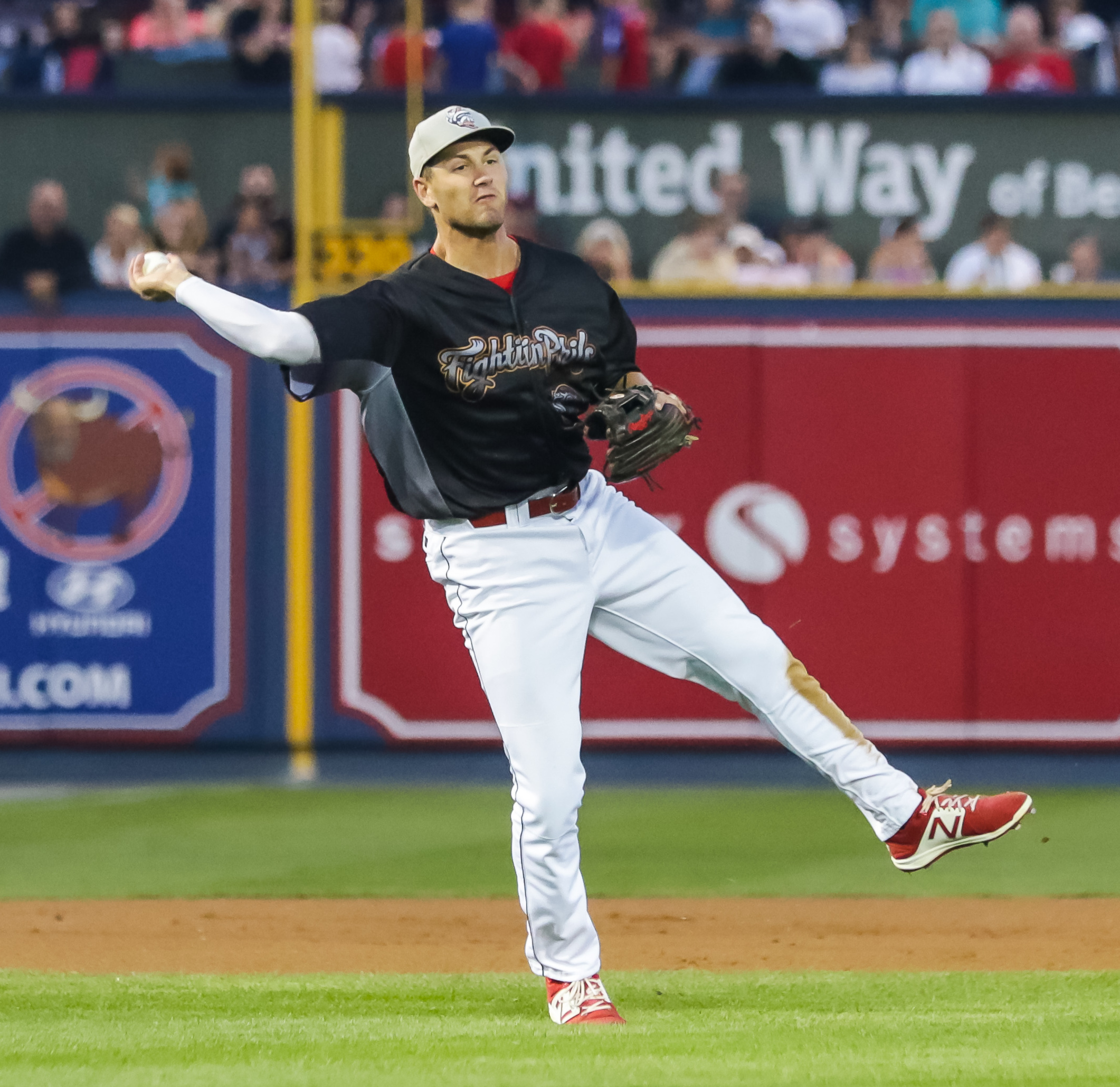
- Walding with the Reading Fightin Phils in 2017
- Third baseman / Catcher
- Born: September 10, 1992 (age 34); Lodi, California, U.S.
- Batted: Left Threw: Right

MLB debut
- May 30, 2018, for the Philadelphia Phillies

Last MLB appearance
- April 23, 2019, for the Philadelphia Phillies

MLB statistics
- Batting average: .053
- Home runs: 1
- Runs batted in: 2
- Stats at Baseball Reference

Teams
- Philadelphia Phillies (2018–2019)

Mitchell S. Walding (born September 10, 1992) is an American former professional baseball infielder. He played in Major League Baseball (MLB) for the Philadelphia Phillies in 2018 and 2019. Walding was drafted by the Phillies in the fifth round of the 2011 Major League Baseball draft.

== Early life ==
Walding was born in Lodi, California. He attended St. Mary's High School in Stockton, California, where he was a starting pitcher and shortstop on the baseball team as well as an all-league quarterback on the football team, graduating in 2011. In his senior year he batted .442 with a .584 slugging percentage, and as a pitcher he was 6-1 with a 0.63 ERA.

== Professional career ==
=== Philadelphia Phillies ===
==== Minor leagues ====
Walding was drafted in the fifth round (181st overall) of the 2011 Major League Baseball draft by the Philadelphia Phillies. He signed for a signing bonus of $800,000, plus having the Phillies pay for his future college expenses. In 2012 in Williamsport he batted .233/.326/.308 with one home run and 31 RBI, and 66 strikeouts in 253 at–bats.

Entering the 2013 season, Walding was ranked #20 among Phillies prospects by MLB.com. In 2013 in Lakewood he batted .224/.323/.286 with one home run, 42 RBI, and 121 strikeouts in 402 at–bats. In 2014, again in Lakewood, he batted .237/.308/.372 with seven home runs, 55 RBI, and 116 strikeouts in 371 at–bats. In 2015 with Clearwater he batted .233/.318/.315 with four home runs, 31 RBI, and 117 strikeouts (8th in the Florida State League) in 403 at–bats.

In 2016 Walding was a mid-season Florida State League All Star with the High–A Clearwater Threshers, an FSL Player of the Week on both April 17 and June 12, a post-season FSL All Star, and an MiLB.com Phillies Organization All Star. For the season, he batted .269 and was tied for 8th in the league with a .440 slugging percentage, and tied for 10th in the league with 111 strikeouts in 350 at–bats.

In 2017, Walding was a mid–season Eastern League All Star with the Double–A Reading Fightin Phils. In June 2017, Walding was Eastern League Player of the Month and Phillies Minor League Hitter of the Month, as he hit 13 home runs in 25 games. For the season, he was fourth in the Eastern League with 25 home runs as he batted .236, fourth in the league in slugging percentage as well at .516, and sixth in the league in strikeouts with 127 (in 351 at–bats).

After starting the 2018 season with the Lehigh Valley IronPigs of the Triple–A International League, for whom he was batting .271/.379/.484 with seven home runs and 54 strikeouts in 155 at–bats, Walding was called up to the major leagues on May 30. He was the MiLB.com International League Player of the Month for July. He concluded his season with Lehigh Valley batting .265/.390 (7th in the league)/.474 (5th) and leading the league with 73 walks, with 70 runs (7th), 19 home runs (3rd), and 69 RBI (5th) with 148 strikeouts (2nd) in 388 at–bats. He was named an International League post-season All Star.

==== Major Leagues ====
Walding made his Major League debut on May 30, 2018, against the Los Angeles Dodgers, going hitless in all four at–bats with four strikeouts. He was the first Phillies player to earn a Golden Sombrero in his MLB debut, and the 6th position player in MLB history to do so. Walding was sent back down to the minor leagues on June 6.

Walding was called back up to the major leagues on June 20, and struck out again in his first plate appearance, making him the first player in the 143 years of Major League Baseball to strike out in all seven of his first seven major league plate appearances. Additionally, he became the only position player in Major League history to come to bat more than four times to start his career with each at bat ending in a strikeout and joined relief pitcher Logan Ondrusek, who is the only other player ever to strike out seven times in their first seven career plate appearances. On September 14, he got his first major league hit when he hit a two-run home run in the bottom of the 8th inning against Bryan Holaday, after an 0–for–14 streak to begin his career. In 2018, he batted .059/.158/.235 in 17 at–bats for the Phillies with a home run, 12 strikeouts, and two RBI.

Walding began the 2019 season with Lehigh Valley but was recalled by the Phillies on April 20, 2019, following injuries to starting infielders Jean Segura and Scott Kingery. In 2019 he batted .206/.351/.369 with 62 walks, 11 home runs, 40 RBI, and 130 strikeouts in 282 at–bats for Lehigh Valley, and struck out in both at-bats for the Phillies. On July 30, 2019, Walding was designated for assignment. He elected free agency following the season on November 4.

=== Toronto Blue Jays ===
On March 9, 2020, Walding signed a minor league deal with the Toronto Blue Jays. Walding did not play in a game in 2020 due to the cancellation of the minor league season because of the COVID-19 pandemic. He became a free agent on November 2.

=== Los Angeles Angels ===
On February 17, 2021, Walding signed with the High Point Rockers of the Atlantic League of Professional Baseball. However, on May 12, before the start of the ALPB season, Walding signed a minor league contract with the Los Angeles Angels organization. Walding spent the majority of the season with the Triple-A Salt Lake Bees, hitting .238/.326/.451 with six home runs and 25 RBI in 33 games. He elected minor league free agency following the season on November 7.

=== San Diego Padres ===
On March 9, 2022, Walding signed a minor league deal with the San Diego Padres. Upon signing, it was announced that Walding would convert to catching. He was assigned to the Double-A San Antonio Missions to begin the year, but limped to a .046/.276/.091 slash in 7 games. On April 30, Walding announced his retirement from professional baseball.
