= 2017 St. Louis Cardinals season =

Major League Baseball season

2017 St. Louis Cardinals
- League: National League
- Division: Central
- Ballpark: Busch Stadium
- City: St. Louis, Missouri
- Record: 83–79 (.512)
- Divisional place: 3rd
- Owners: William DeWitt, Jr. Fred Hanser
- General managers: Mike Girsch (June 30, 2017 – ), John Mozeliak ( -June 29, 2017)
- Managers: Mike Matheny
- Television: Fox Sports Midwest (Dan McLaughlin, Al Hrabosky, Rick Horton, Tim McCarver, Jim Edmonds)
- Radio: KMOX NewsRadio 1120; St. Louis Cardinals Radio Network (Mike Shannon, John Rooney, Rick Horton, Mike Claiborne)
- Stats: ESPN.com; Baseball Reference

The 2017 St. Louis Cardinals season was the 136th for the St. Louis Cardinals of Major League Baseball (MLB), a franchise in St. Louis, Missouri. It was the 126th season for the Cardinals in the National League (NL), and their 12th at Busch Stadium III. The Cardinals missed the playoffs for a second consecutive season, having last done that between the 2007 and 2008 seasons.

== Off-season ==
=== Overview ===
Major League Baseball and the Players' Association reached a new, tentative CBA contract to reduce the 15-day disabled list timetable to 10-days. This change will allow teams to make quicker decisions on whether to bring up a roster replacement rather than wait to see if the injured player would be ready to return to action in less than two weeks. In addition, the home field advantage in the World Series for the league winning the All-Star Game is repealed starting this year. Home field advantage in the World Series will be awarded to the league champion team with the better regular season win–loss record. The details of the new five-years contract (expiring Nov. 30, 2021) listed here .

Commissioner Rob Manfred levied a severe penalty, Jan. 30, 2017, on the Cardinals organization from former scouting director Chris Correa's hacking of the Houston Astros database in 2013 and 2014, who was fired by early-July 2015, and is now serving out a 46-month sentence (for unlawfully accessing another company's information) that began in July 2016, and ordered to pay a $279,038 fine. The Cardinals must give the Astros their No. 56 overall selection, part of the Draft's second round, and the No. 75 overall selection, part of Compensation Round B. St. Louis does not possess a first-round pick in this year's Draft. Additionally, the team must pay the Astros $2 million. No other person was responsible for hacking into the Astros' database. Correa has been placed on baseball's permanently ineligible list.

=== Acquisitions, departures, and roster moves ===
==== Players ====
Former Cubs' center fielder and free agent Dexter Fowler signed with the Cardinals on December 9, 2016, for $82.5 mil. over 5 years. The contract includes a full no-trade clause.

Yadier Molina reached an agreement for a 3-year contract extension on April 2, for a reported $60 million, making him the highest-paid catcher in baseball. He wasn't interested in exercising his 2018 mutual option, which would have been worth $15 million. The average annual value of Giants' catcher Buster Posey's contract is $18.5 million. The extension assures Molina of remaining in St. Louis through 2020, and increases the chances that he will finish his career having played for just one organization that drafted him (2000), and he has been in the majors since 2004. This distinction of having Molina retire as a Cardinal is something that carried weight for both parties throughout the negotiations.

In the 12 seasons Molina has been the No. 1 catcher, the Cards won more regular-season games than any other National League team (1,075). Their 48 postseason victories were the most in baseball in that time, and they had three NL pennants and World Series wins in 2006 and 2011. Molina was a seven-time All-Star and an eight-time Gold Glove winner. The Cards have a 3.79 ERA over the past 12 years, the second lowest in the Majors. The Cards had two other factors to weigh. One is that one of their top prospects, Carson Kelly, is a catcher and widely considered Major League ready. Another is that Molina's 1,582 games are the 24th most in history at his position, and he's likely to become just the sixth to break the 2,000-game mark.

No position takes its toll on a body more than catcher. Still, at 34, Molina is coming off a season in which he started a career-high 142 games and batted .307. He batted .333 in the World Baseball Classic (Puerto Rico), and looked as good as ever behind the plate.

April 3 brought yet another contract extension. Stephen Piscotty, 26, signed a six-year extension for a reported $33.75 million ($5.625 mil. average), with a $15 million option for 2023 on April 3. Piscotty was not yet arbitration-eligible, and his first year of free-agent eligibility was to be 2022. Five years ago, the Cardinals plucked Piscotty out of Stanford University with one of the two picks they netted as compensation for Albert Pujols' departure. Since making his big league debut, Piscotty has posted a .282/.349/.467 slash line and an .816 OPS. In 2016, Piscotty led the Cards in games played (153), runs scored (86), RBIs (85) and game-winning RBIs (10).

Contract options

St. Louis Cardinals
St. Louis Cardinals Declined and bought out for $2 million

Trades

November 2016	To Atlanta Braves Jaime García	To St. Louis Cardinals Chris Ellis, Luke Dykstra, John Gant
	To	To

Major league free agents

Brett Cecil (RP)	Departed Toronto Blue Jays November 1, 2016 Contract expired after World Series	Signed with St. Louis Cardinals November 21, 2016 4 years, $30.5 million
Matt Holliday (LF)	Departed St. Louis Cardinals November 1, 2016 Contracts expired after World Series	Signed with New York Yankees December 7, 2016 1 year, $13 million
Dexter Fowler (CF)	Departed Chicago Cubs November 1, 2016 Contract expired after World Series	Signed with St. Louis Cardinals December 9, 2016 5 years, $82.5 million

== Spring training ==
The Cardinals had 66 players in camp before 11 were sent to minor league camp on March 13, including three on the 40-man roster, and eight non-roster invitees. Among those sent down was left-handed pitcher Marco Gonzales (40-man), who still is working his way back from Tommy John surgery that he had about 11 months ago. Gonzales has been working behind the scenes with a few bullpen sessions during Spring Training, and it's possible he could wrap up his recovery by the end of May. "Once Marco gets healthy, it's just a matter of how well he's able to execute his pitches," Matheny said of the left-hander's potential return to the Cardinals.

The other players reassigned were RHP Sandy Alcántara, INF Eliezer Alvarez (40-man), RHP Jack Flaherty, LHP Austin Gomber, C Andrew Knizner, C Jeremy Martinez, C Dennis Ortega, RHP Daniel Poncedeleon, RHP Robby Rowland and INF Edmundo Sosa (40-man).

Matheny praised all of them, and said he was especially impressed with Ortega's work in camp.

"Dennis really showed a lot of moxie behind the plate," Matheny said of the 19-year-old prospect. "He catches older than 19, and I think you're going to see a high ceiling with him. ... All of them have had a good spring. The development staff has done such a great job. It just seems every one of these kids, they're coming in and they just look a little more refined. They've been really on top of their game, and you can tell they have a lot of things to look forward to."

On March 16, RHP Corey Baker and Trey Nielsen were sent to Min. Lg. camp.

NRI (LHP) Jordan Schafer had arm surgery on March 17.

The Cardinals optioned RHP Luke Weaver to AAA-Memphis, and reassigned RH reliever Mitch Harris to minor league camp on March 18. The moves left 35 active players and 16 non-roster invitees in big league Spring Training.

2 NRIs, (RHP) Josh Lucas and (LHP) Zach Phillips, were reassigned on March 19, to Min. Lg. camp. Right-hander Rowan Wick and outfielder Anthony García were optioned to AAA-Memphis. On March 20, 2 more NRIs, (C) Gabriel Lino and (OF) Todd Cunningham were also reassigned to Min. Lg. camp. (2B/SS) Breyvic Valera was optioned to AAA-Memphis.

(RHP) Sam Tuivailala was optioned to AAA-Memphis on March 22, leaving 31 on the active roster and 42 in big league camp. Matt Adams played the outfield for the first time since Little League. The Cardinals are introducing a new mobile ticket subscription idea called "Ballpark Pass" that gives fans all the home games they want to attend, $29.99/month (with auto-renewal) for each of the six months of the season, by using their smartphone, with no printed tickets. But there are no seats with this new attendance feature, only standing-room. The pass covers all 80 home games, except for Opening Day/Night. More information at Ballpark Pass

(OF) Tommy Pham was optioned to AAA on March 25, leaving 30 on the active roster and 41 in big league camp. The Opening Day (Night) roster has now been finalized, at the earliest date since Matheny became manager, with (OF) Jose Martinez, 28, having the most poignant story. After 10 years of toiling in the minors, the Venezuelan made his debut last September when he was called up by the Cardinals. But as for making the Opening Day roster, he didn't think that would ever happen. He leads the Cardinals with 17 hits, four homers and 13 RBIs this spring. He also enhanced his credentials by showing that he could play first base, in addition to both corner outfield spots. (RHP) Miguel Socolovich, (RHP) Matt Bowman, (SS/2B) Greg Garcia, and (C) Eric Fryer were also assured spots on the active roster. Tyler Lyons, Zach Duke, and Alex Reyes will start the season on the disabled list.

Four more cuts on March 27, sent (C) Carson Kelly (Cardinals' #2 prospect ) to get more at-bats, and (RHP) Mike Mayers optioned to AAA. (OF) Adolis García and (3B) Patrick Wisdom gone to Min. Lg. camp. These changes gave the team 28 active players, and 9 NRIs remaining.

On the last day at Jupiter on March 29, the Cardinals purchased (C) Eric Fryer's contract from AAA-Memphis, and added him to the 40-man roster. He will be Yadier Molina's backup. To make room on the 40-man roster, the injured (P) Zach Duke is transferred to the 60-day DL. Five NRIs: (3B) Paul DeJong, (RHP) Arturo Reyes, (LHP) Ryan Sherriff, (OF) Harrison Bader, and (OF) Chad Huffman were assigned to Min. Lg. camp. These changes bring the NRIs to 3, with 28 active. The last spring training game for 2017 got the team 20 wins (beating the Washington Nationals, Box Score), first time since 1997, vs. 8 losses. Michael Wacha pitched four innings in 64 pitches, giving up five hits in a 6–2 win. Cardinals outfielder/first baseman José Martínez capped a terrific spring with a two-run double off reliever Phillips Valdez to extend the lead in the sixth. Martinez finished with a team-most 19 hits, 14 runs, 15 RBIs, .508 OBP, .740 Slg% and 1.248 OPS (50 AB), in the Grapefruit League season batting .

The Cardinals will play an exhibition game "Battle of the Birds" against their Triple-A affiliate in Memphis on Thu. March 30. First pitch is scheduled for 7:05 p.m. CT on KMOX (1120AM), and Gameday Audio. The Cardinals will use several relievers to cover the game, beginning with right-hander Jonathan Broxton, who will be making his first career start. The Cardinals beat the Redbirds, 9–3 in slugging four home runs, with Broxton getting the win, pitching only the first inning. Randal Grichuk, who took a pitch off his hand in Wednesday's (March 29) Grapefruit finale, was not in the lineup. He hopes to return soon. The sellout attendance was 10,220 at AutoZone Park.

The Cardinals will close out their exhibition schedule Friday (March 31) with a 5:05 p.m. CT game with the Double-A Springfield Cardinals at Hammons Field in Springfield, Mo. Mike Leake, 3–1 in Grapefruit League play, will get his final tuneup. On March 31, Leake threw 89 pitches in a 5–2 win over the team's AA-level Springfield affiliate. Leake called this spring, "the best spring I've had in my career." Randal Grichuk returned to the lineup after missing the AAA-Memphis game with his sore right hand, after getting a HBP to it. He singled on the first pitch he saw. Since Springfield became a Cardinals affiliate in 2005, 104 of its players have reached the big leagues.

=== Injuries ===
After an MRI, Alex Reyes, 22 (RHP), was diagnosed with a partial UCL tear in his elbow on February 14, and will have Tommy John surgery, losing him for the entire 2017 season. General manager John Mozeliak said an MRI taken of Reyes' elbow in 2013 showed a strain. He didn't begin his minor league season until June that season. He made his major league debut Aug. 9, 2016, and was 4–1 with a 1.57 ERA in five starts and seven relief appearances, with 52 strikeouts in 46 innings. MLBPipeline.com ranks him the #3 pitching prospect in baseball, and #14 overall. ESPN's Keith Law has Reyes ranked as the #2 pitching prospect in baseball.

Reyes had successful surgery in Florida on February 16. Head team physician Dr. George Paletta performed the procedure.

NRI (LHP) Jordan Schafer went under the knife on March 17. Instead of replacing Schafer's ulnar collateral ligament in his elbow, Cardinals team doctor George Paletta performed a repair of the ligament. By avoiding Tommy John surgery, Schafer has an estimated recovery time of seven months. If the ligament had been replaced, recovery would have taken at least a year.

The injury-bug hit the Cardinals once again on March 30, with (RHP) Trevor Rosenthal going on the 10-day disabled list with a right lat strain. The move gives (RHP) Sam Tuivailala an active roster spot. The Cardinals have three off-days over their first 10-game stretch, giving them more leeway for the starters' rotation and relievers needed. Others who start the season on the 10-day DL are: (LHP) Tyler Lyons (right knee), and (RHP) John Gant (right groin), and (RHP) Alex Reyes (Tommy John surgery).

== Season standings ==
=== National League playoff standings ===
Playoff standings

Division leaders
Team	W	L	Pct.
Los Angeles Dodgers	104	58	.642
Washington Nationals	97	65	.599
Chicago Cubs	92	70	.568

Wild Card teams (Top 2 teams qualify for postseason)
Team	W	L	Pct.	GB
Arizona Diamondbacks	93	69	.574	+6
Colorado Rockies	87	75	.537	—
Milwaukee Brewers	86	76	.531	1
St. Louis Cardinals	83	79	.512	4
Miami Marlins	77	85	.475	10
Pittsburgh Pirates	75	87	.463	12
Atlanta Braves	72	90	.444	15
San Diego Padres	71	91	.438	16
New York Mets	70	92	.432	17
Cincinnati Reds	68	94	.420	19
Philadelphia Phillies	66	96	.407	21
San Francisco Giants	64	98	.395	23

=== National League head-to-head records ===
Head-to-head records

2017 National League record Source: MLB Standings Grid – 2017
Team	AZ	ATL	CHC	CIN	COL	LAD	MIA	MIL	NYM	PHI	PIT	SD	SF	STL	WSH	AL
Arizona	—	2–4	3–3	3–3	11–8	11–8	3–4	4–3	6–1	6–1	4–3	11–8	12–7	3–4	2–4	12–8
Atlanta	4–2	—	1–6	3–3	3–4	3–4	11–8	4–2	7–12	6–13	2–5	5–2	4–3	1–5	9–10	9–11
Chicago	3–3	6–1	—	12–7	2–5	2–4	4–3	10–9	4–2	4–3	10–9	2–4	4–3	14–5	3–4	12–8
Cincinnati	3–3	3–3	7–12	—	3–4	0–6	2–5	8–11	3–4	4–2	13–6	3–4	4–3	9–10	1–6	5–15
Colorado	8–11	4–3	5–2	4–3	—	10–9	2–4	4–3	3–3	5–2	3–3	12–7	12–7	2–4	3–4	10–10
Los Angeles	8–11	4–3	4–2	6–0	9–10	—	6–1	3–3	7–0	4–3	6–1	13–6	11–8	4–3	3–3	16–4
Miami	4–3	8–11	3–4	5–2	4–2	1–6	—	2–4	12–7	8–11	3–4	5–1	5–1	2–5	6–13	9–11
Milwaukee	3–4	2–4	9–10	11–8	3–4	3–3	4–2	—	5–2	3–3	9–10	5–2	3–4	11–8	4–3	11–9
New York	1–6	12–7	2–4	4–3	3–3	0–7	7–12	2–5	—	12–7	3–3	3–4	5–1	3–4	6–13	7–13
Philadelphia	1–6	13–6	3–4	2–4	2–5	3–4	11–8	3–3	7–12	—	2–5	1–5	4–3	1–5	8–11	5–15
Pittsburgh	3–4	5–2	9–10	6–13	3–3	1–6	4–3	10–9	3–3	5–2	—	3–3	1–5	8–11	4–3	10–10
San Diego	8–11	2–5	4–2	4–3	7–12	6–13	1–5	2–5	4–3	5–1	3–3	—	12–7	3–4	2–5	8–12
San Francisco	7–12	3–4	3–4	3–4	7–12	8–11	1–5	4–3	1–5	3–4	5–1	7–12	—	3–4	1–5	8–12
St. Louis	4–3	5–1	5–14	10–9	4–2	3–4	5–2	8–11	4–3	5–1	11–8	4–3	4–3	—	3–3	8–12
Washington	4–2	10–9	4–3	6–1	4–3	3–3	13–6	3–4	13–6	11–8	3–4	5–2	5–1	3–3	—	10–10

== Regular season summary ==
Manager Mike Matheny made the speculation official on March 19: Michael Wacha would join Carlos Martínez, Adam Wainwright, Lance Lynn, and Mike Leake in an all-righty rotation. Wacha entered Spring Training without a confirmed rotation spot. He had posted a 2.65 ERA and 1.24 WHIP over five starts. Wacha had struck out 15 and walked four over 17 innings. He had two spring starts remaining. The Cards had yet to reveal how they will order the five to begin the season, or who would start the team's season opener in two weeks.

On March 22, manager Matheny decided the Opening Night starter would be Carlos Martínez, his first opening day start. At 25, he was the youngest pitcher to draw an Opening Day start for the Cards since Joe Magrane in 1989. Martinez was opposed by the Chicago Cubs' Jon Lester in the nationally televised game from Busch Stadium. He signed a five-year, $51 million contract with the team in January. He was St. Louis' top starter in 2016, going 16–9, with a 3.04 ERA and 174 strikeouts in a career-high 195.1 innings. Adam Wainwright started the second game on April 4.

It was announced that the Cardinals and Pittsburgh Pirates would be the latest MLB teams to play a game in historic Williamsport, Pennsylvania, site of the annual Little League World Series, at BB&T Ballpark at Historic Bowman Field, home of the Williamsport Crosscutters, a Philadelphia Phillies affiliate in the short-season (New York-Penn League). The stadium has an official seating capacity of 2,366. They would play on Sunday, August 20, with Pittsburgh as the home team. It would be televised by ESPN as its weekly Sunday Night Baseball game. Outfielder Randal Grichuk played (and pitched) for the Lamar Little League team that reached the World Series in 2003 and 2004.

=== April ===
==== Opening Night win over Cubs at Busch Stadium ====
Opening Night (7:35 pm) was on Sunday April 2, with a nationwide audience on ESPN saw Randal Grichuk drive in three runs, including the game-winning single, a 390-foot blast to left field in the bottom of the ninth to beat the Cubs, 4–3 for the first win of the 2017 season. It was his second career walk-off hit and both were against the Cubs. Grichuk batted a lowly eighth in the lineup after a sub-par spring. Jose Martinez, 28, but a rookie this year and on an Opening Day roster for the first time in his career, crushed a one-out, pinch-hit double in the ninth that landed 397 feet away in right-center, to ignite the Cardinals' game-winning rally. Closer Seung-Hwan Oh had given up a three-run home run in the top of the ninth to Willson Contreras to tie the game 3–3. The homer left a no-decision, after an outstanding 7.1 innings from ace Carlos Martínez, enjoying his first Opening Day start of his career. Martinez carved up the Cubs' lineup, struck out 10 (including reigning National League MVP Kris Bryant three times), walking none, scattering six hits (one double), and never allowed a runner to advance past second. Martinez became the first starting pitcher in the Statcast Era (since 2015) to record three swinging strikeouts on pitches faster than 99 mph. Martinez fanned Bryant with a 99.7-mph fastball in the first and a 99.1-mph fastball in the sixth. Addison Russell struck out on a 99.6-mph fastball in the second inning. The Cubs' manager Joe Maddon said, "He's got as good a right-handed arm as anybody in the league." Dexter Fowler legged-out an infield hit in the third inning, his first since defecting from the Cubs to the Cardinals over the off-season, giving the Cards their first run of the game and season after Matt Carpenter's sacrifice fly. Yadier Molina had the distinction of becoming the first player in baseball history to receive a no-pitch intentional walk, that loaded the bases for Grichuk, who, having smashed a critical two-run homer an inning earlier making it 3–0, launched a 1–1 pitch off the wall in left-center to set off a celebration. MLB columnist Phil Rogers opined about this most-intense rivalry in baseball: "You better believe the Cardinals have their hopes of winning it all. They might be at their most dangerous when you don't see them coming, and this could be that kind of year. The march to October has begun, and don't be surprised if it includes teams on both ends of this rivalry." Commissioner Rob Manfred was among those in attendance. The three hour 33 minute game featured the third-largest attendance (47,566) in Busch Stadium history.

Opening Night starting lineup
at Busch Stadium, April 2, 2017
defeated CHI, 4–3
No.	Name	Pos.
25	Dexter Fowler	CF
36	Aledmys Díaz	SS
13	Matt Carpenter	1B
27	Jhonny Peralta	3B
4	Yadier Molina	C
55	Stephen Piscotty	RF
3	Jedd Gyorko	2B
15	Randal Grichuk	LF
18	Carlos Martínez	P

==== Rosenthal activated, Tuivailala optioned ====
On April 10, injured reliever Trevor Rosenthal was activated from the 10-day DL and Sam Tuivailala was optioned to AAA Memphis. The organization liked the idea of using Rosenthal as a flex reliever who could pitch multiple innings mid-game or meaningful ones late in games. One week into the season, the Cards' bullpen had allowed 13 runs and six home runs over 17.1 innings.

==== Lyons activated, Peralta on DL ====
On April 20, injured LH Reliever Tyler Lyons was activated from the DL. Jhonny Peralta was placed on the DL due to an upper respiratory illness.

==== Carpenter serves one-game suspension ====
Matt Carpenter served a one-game suspension on April 25, for bumping umpire John Tumpane on April 23. Carpenter was ejected by Tumpane after arguing a pair of called strikes in the seventh inning. As the argument turned heated, the top of Carpenter's helmet scraped the bottom of Tumpane's hat. Any contact with an umpire automatically triggers a suspension. Carpenter also paid a fine. The Cardinals on April 25 out-righted outfielder Anthony Garcia and did not immediately fill the roster spot

==== Chris Coghlan does aerial flip to score ====
Blue Jays pinch-hitter Chris Coghlan performed an acrobatic aerial flip and somersault over Yadier Molina to score the go-ahead run in the seventh inning in the April 25, 6–5 loss in 11 innings. The run snapped reliever Matt Bowman's 19.2 inning scoreless streak. The Cardinals answered in the bottom of the seventh with outfielder José Martínez hitting his first career home run, a two-run blast to tie the game at four. The Blue Jays blew two saves in a game for the first time since 2014, but it avoided its worst 20-game start in franchise history by improving to 6–14, while the Cardinals missed a chance to get to .500 and fell to 9–11.

==== Carpenter hits grand slam in 11th to beat Blue Jays ====
Matt Carpenter hit a walk-off grand slam, and first grand slam of his career, in the 11th inning of an 8–4 victory versus the Blue Jays in the first game of a split double-header on April 27.

=== May ===
==== Lyons back on DL, Tuivailala recalled ====
LHP Tyler Lyons was placed back on the DL on May 2 with a right intercostal muscle strain. RHP Sam Tuivailala was recalled.

==== Piscotty on DL for first time, Pham recalled ====
On May 5, RF Stephen Piscotty was placed on the DL for the first time in his career with a right hamstring strain. Tommy Pham was recalled. CF Dexter Fowler, on the other hand, avoided the DL altogether from a sore right shoulder, and, after undergoing an MRI exam in St. Louis, was cleared to pinch-hit on Friday (May 5).

==== Magneuris Sierra makes debut, Jose Martinez on DL ====
Twenty-one year old (advanced) A-level outfielder Magneuris Sierra made his major league debut on May 7, after José Martínez was put on the DL with a left groin strain. Sierra was the youngest position player to appear with the Cardinals since Miguel Mejia did it 10 days after his 21st birthday in 1996. Sierra, who was hitting .272/.337/.407 with seven extra-base hits and three stolen bases in 20 games for the Palm Beach Cardinals (Class A-Advanced) in the Florida State League, was just the third 21-year-old position player to reach the Majors with the Cardinals in the last 22 years; Albert Pujols (2001) was the most recent. Sierra's speed had a big impact on the Cardinals since his first three days from May 7. The Cardinals' #7 prospect in the 6–5 win on May 9, singled and scored in a four-run eighth inning that tied the game at 5, and then singled and scored what proved to be the winning run in the top of the ninth. He dashed home with the game-deciding run on Dexter Fowler's pinch-hit single in the ninth, sliding in ahead of the tag in blazing fashion. His sprint, which was clocked by Statcast at 7.24 seconds despite a modest 14.2-foot secondary lead. The dash was St. Louis' second-fastest second-to-home time this year on a play with a secondary lead of less than 15 feet. On his ninth-inning single he went from home to first base in 3.88 seconds, helping force an error that got him into scoring position at second. Only seven players this season have recorded a faster home-to-first time on a non-bunt. It tied Sierra's own record (set Monday night, May 8) for the Cardinals' fastest non-bunt, home-to-first time in the Statcast Era (since 2015).

==== Series win vs. Cubs, consecutive attendance records set ====
The Cardinals beat the Cubs two best aces in the last two games of the three-set after losing the Friday (May 12, attendance 47,601) game, setting consecutive attendance records at the newest Busch Stadium in the process. On May 13, the Birds beat Jon Lester 5–3, setting a new stadium record with 47,882 paid, with Carlos Martínez the victor. The next (day) game, May 14, saw Adam Wainwright return to his usual superb form over seven innings, shutting out the Cubs and ace Jake Arrieta, 5–0, thanks in part to Matt Carpenter's first hit in the regular season off good buddy and former teammate at Texas Christian University, and groomsman at his wedding, Arrieta. Prior to that home run, Carpenter was 0-for-28 in the regular season against him. The attendance of 47,925 broke the previous day's record. The three-game total of 143,408 set the all-time series record. The Cardinals retained first place in the NL Central (21–15, .583; 1 game ahead of the surprising Milwaukee Brewers, 21–17), while the Cubs, who fell below .500 (18–19, .486) with their seventh loss in nine games, sit 3 1/2 games back.

==== Gant activated, optioned to Memphis ====
RH reliever John Gant was activated from the DL on May 16, and sent to AAA Memphis.

==== Peralta activated, Sierra optioned ====
May 19 brought 3B-man Jhonny Peralta back to active status since April 17, while speedy OF'er Magneuris Sierra was optioned (played in May 17 game, no game May 18), with a promotion to the (AA Level) Springfield Cardinals. Peralta batted only .120 (3-for-25) in eight games, while Sierra made his major league debut on May 7, hitting safely in each of his seven games played, batting .367 (11-for-30) with eight runs scored.

==== Cardinals lose, committing 35th error ====
The San Francisco Giants won on May 19, 6–5, thanks to the Cardinals' NL-leading 35th error of the season helping the Giants to their three-run seventh. Dexter Fowler brought the Cardinals to a 5–3 lead with a three-run home run in the bottom of the inning after a 46-min rain delay, before the Giants answered with a run in the eighth, and two more in the ninth for the win. Prior to the loss, the Cardinals had not lost a game this season when taking a lead into the ninth. The Giants are now 2–21 this season when trailing after eight innings, and they entered 6–15 on the road. Mark Melancon, making his first appearance since May 3, converted his 17th career save against the Cardinals, most against any opponent.

==== Matt Adams traded, Piscotty activated from DL ====
Before the game on May 20, the Cardinals announced a trade: 1B Matt Adams to the Atlanta Braves and cash considerations for a minor league infielder Juan Yepez. Stephen Piscotty was activated from the DL after finishing a rehab assignment since his May 4 injured right hamstring strain. 1B/3B Yepez is 19, from Caracas, Venezuela, who signed with the Braves in July 2014, as a non-drafted free agent, who was playing at A-level with the Rome Braves.

==== Tuivailala optioned to Memphis Redbirds, Lyons activated ====
On May 22, RH reliever Sam Tuivailala was optioned to the AAA Memphis Redbirds, leaving 24 on the active roster and 38 on the 40-man roster. The next day, LH reliever Tyler Lyons was activated, joining the team in time for the series in Los Angeles against the Dodgers.

==== Piscotty on personal leave ====
RF Stephen Piscotty took personal leave before the Friday, May 26 game. He remained on the roster after he left Friday, and Matheny said he didn't know when to expect him to return to the club. The Cardinals did not appear to have a player available to add to the roster in time for Friday's game, but they could add a player during the weekend to take Piscotty's place. He left a couple hours before the first pitch. He was not in the lineup, but that was unrelated to his personal matter.

==== Socolovich DFA, John Brebbia purchased (AAA) ====
RH reliever Miguel Socolovich was designated for assignment (removed from the 40-man roster temporarily) on May 27. He was 0–1 with one save in 15 appearances, striking out 14 in 18 2/3 innings. RH reliever John Brebbia was purchased from the AAA Memphis Redbirds. Brebbia has made nine straight scoreless appearances for Memphis. He has a 1.69 ERA, 29 strikeouts and five walks over 26 2/3 innings.

==== Wong on DL, Paul DeJong purchased ====
2B Kolten Wong was placed on the DL, retroactive to May 27, from a left elbow strain before the game on May 28. 3B/SS Paul DeJong, 23, was purchased from AAA.

==== Martinez activated, Grichuk optioned to A-level ====
RF José Martinez was activated before the May 29 game. LF Randal Grichuk was optioned to A-level Palm Beach. The team decided to send Grichuk to Palm Beach rather than the Triple-A affiliate in Memphis. GM John Mozeliak said this was to put Grichuk in a lower-stress environment where he could play consistently and work on things like his strike zone management. Mozeliak added that Grichuk will have a different voice to learn from, working with George Greer as he tries to get back to the Majors.

==== DeJong homers in first at-bat ====
Newly promoted 2B/3B/SS Paul DeJong hit a home run in his first at-bat in the majors. It came as a pinch-hitter at Coors Field in the ninth inning off veteran closer Greg Holland, who was before the game, 19-for-19 in saves and boasting a 0.96 ERA. The home run was the fourth for the Cardinals, but it did them no good as they fell 4–8 to the Colorado Rockies. The ball sailed 388 feet into the left field stands. DeJong hit .294 with a team-high 11 homers and 31 RBIs in 46 games with the Memphis Redbirds this spring, but he has little experience as a pinch-hitter, so he made frequent trips from the dugout to the indoor batting cage. With his parents in the stands, DeJong unwound on a 92 mph fastball and circled the bases into the history books. "It was just a dream come true," DeJong said. "I've been playing baseball since I was four years old, and to do that in my first at bat was something I'll remember forever." DeJong was the ninth Cardinals' player to accomplish the feat: the last time was by Mark Worrell in the second game of a June 5, 2008 doubleheader. He followed up the next day (May 29) with a single and a double against the Los Angeles Dodgers. DeJong is the Cardinals #11 Prospect .

==== Gyorko on personal leave, Piscotty on the way back ====
Jedd Gyorko took personal leave in a hurry before the May 30 game to be with his wife who is expecting. Stephen Piscotty is on his way back to St. Louis after leaving the team Friday (May 26) afternoon to deal with a personal matter at his home in Pleasanton, California. His mother was diagnosed with ALS. He returned to the team in time for the May 31 game after missing five games. Because of the two personal leaves, the Cardinals played with a two-man bench on May 30.

==== Broxton released, John Gant recalled ====
RH reliever John Gant was recalled before the game on May 31, after Jonathan Broxton was released. Should Broxton sign elsewhere, the Cardinals will be responsible for the remainder of his $3.75 million salary in 2017, minus the pro-rated minimum. Broxton, 32, threw 15 2/3 innings for the Cardinals this year with an awful 6.89 ERA. Gant, 24, was acquired by the Cardinals last December as part of the package that sent Jaime Garcia to the Atlanta Braves. He had begun 2017 on the disabled list with a right groin strain, but returned on May 16, and had been working as a starter in Memphis. In three starts for the Memphis Redbirds, Gant was 0–1 with a 2.19 ERA and 11 strikeouts in 12 1/3 total innings. He will be available for Wednesday night's (May 31) game against the Dodgers out of the bullpen as the long reliever.

=== June ===
==== Pujols hits his 600th home run with Angels ====
Former Cardinals' superstar Albert Pujols hit his 600th career home run on June 3 for the Los Angeles Angels, becoming only the ninth player to achieve that feat. He was the first to hit a grand slam for his 600th. He hit his 500th on April 22, 2014. Pujols at 37 and 139 days, is the fourth-youngest player (behind Alex Rodriguez, Babe Ruth, and Hank Aaron) to hit 600 homers. He joined Barry Bonds (762), Hank Aaron (755), Babe Ruth (714), Alex Rodriguez (696), Willie Mays (660), Ken Griffey Jr. (630), Jim Thome (612), and Sammy Sosa (609), as the only other players to have 600. Thome was the last to do it on August 15, 2011. Pujols hit .328 with a 1.037 OPS averaging 40 Doubles (455 with the Cardinals), 40 home runs (445 with the Cardinals), and 121 RBIs per season when with the Cardinals in the 11 years, 2001–2011. He signed a 10-year, $240 million contract with the Angels before the 2012 campaign, though age and a spate of lower-body injuries have stunted his production in recent years. He hit .328/.420/.617 in those 11 years (21–32), but only .265/.323/.469 (.793 OPS) with the Angels (2012 – June 3, 2017; 32–37) from injuries.

==== Gyorko returns from paternity leave, Sierra optioned ====
3B Jedd Gyorko was reinstated from paternity leave in the birth of his third child, before the finale on June 4; after missing the first two games against the Cubs. OF'er Magneuris Sierra was optioned to AA-level Springfield Cardinals. Gyorko leads the team with a .321 average.

==== Ballpark Village a finalist for ULI's Global Award for Excellence ====
Ballpark Village is one of 25 finalists for the Urban Land Institute's Global Award for Excellence, founded in 1979. The award recognizes "outstanding development projects on an international platform in the private, public and nonprofit sectors". The Cardinals and The Cordish Companies collaborated on the planning and construction of Ballpark Village, which opened in 2014. It marked the first time that a professional sports venue was master planned and fully integrated into a broader mixed-use development. Ballpark Village has attracted more than 10 million guests since opening, and it will soon be expanding. Over the offseason, the Cardinals and The Cordish Companies announced plans for a 550,000 square feet (12.6 acres) second phase that will include a residential towner, office space and additional retail restaurant and entertainment space. Construction on that $220 million phase is expected to begin later this year. ULI will select a winner among these finalists during its October meeting in Los Angeles. The Cordish Companies have been awarded seven ULI Awards for Excellence, more than any other developer in the world.

==== Scooter Gennett hits 4 home runs ====
On June 6, the Cincinnati Reds' utility infielder, Scooter Gennett, 27, had the night of his career with a 4-home run game (#4, 5, 6, and 7) including a grand slam, going 5-for-5 (a single), and driving in 10 runs, in a 13–1 thrashing of the plummeting Cardinals with their fifth-straight loss. He became the 17th player, and it was the first time against any Cardinals' team, to accomplish the 4-homer game feat, with his fourth in the bottom of the eighth inning with a man on-base, for his 9th and 10th RBIs. His slash line jumped from .270/.308/.450 with a .758 OPS to .302/.336/.578 and .914 OPS with a 135 OPS+, and his RBIs from 20 to 30. Josh Hamilton was the last player to have a 4-home run game on May 8, 2012.

==== Chad Huffman promoted, Gant optioned ====
1B Chad Huffman, a longtime friend of Matt Carpenter, was promoted from AAA. RHP John Gant was optioned The Cardinals had an open spot for Huffman on the 40-man roster, and made space for him on the active roster by optioning RHP John Gant. The move reduced the pitching staff to 12 for the first time since April 20.

==== Peralta DFA, Wong activated; coaching changes ====
The Cardinals held a press conference before the game on June 9, with GM John Mozeliak announcing a number of personnel changes after a disastrous 0–7 road trip. 3B Jhonny Peralta was DFA, and 2B Kolten Wong was activated. In addition, there were a number of coaching changes. Assistant hitting coach Bill Mueller was given a leave of absence, replaced by Mark Budaska (hitting coach at AAA-Memphis). 3B coach Chris Maloney was reassigned within the organization, replaced by quality control coach Mike Shildt. Ron "Pop" Warner was added to the coaching staff. This is the first time Mozeliak had to make a mid-season coaching staff change. The drop to 26–32, was the lowest below .500 that Mgr. Mike Matheny has seen since his hire after the 2011 season. It is also the first time since the end of the 2007 season that they have had a record this poor this late in the season. During the road trip, there wasn't a facet of the game that could support the Cardinals. The starting pitching faltered and frayed with an ERA greater than 7.00 and not one quality start. The manager twice removed a starter early in order to goose the substandard offense with a pinch-hitter, and still the Cardinals scored a total of 20 runs in the seven-day trip. They allowed more than 40. The bullpen ruptured in the final three games of the series in Cincinnati with a close game Wednesday coming apart on lefty Brett Cecil.

==== Cards end seven-game losing streak ====
The Cardinals ended their worst losing streak (7 games) since 2007 on June 9 at home against the weak Phillies, from strong pitching by Michael Wacha, a key home run by Aledmys Díaz, and a four-star catch by Tommy Pham to end the threat in the ninth inning.

==== Martínez throws first complete game and shutout ====
Carlos Martínez threw his first career complete game and shutout on June 10 (afternoon game), at home against the Phillies, 7–0. He scattered four hits, striking out 11. It was his first shutout in 80 starts. Eric Fryer was the catcher, with Yadier Molina out with a strained back. Martinez had been oh-so-close to checking the accomplishment off his list a month ago when he twirled nine scoreless innings against the San Francisco Giants. He had to settle for a no-decision, however, since his offense couldn't muster a run of support. In becoming the first Cardinals' pitcher to notch a complete game this year, Martinez highlighted why the Cardinals believe he's a budding ace in this rotation. The Phillies did not advance a runner as far as third, and with 11 strikeouts, Martinez became the first Cards' pitcher since Adam Wainwright (2010) with four straight starts of at least eight strikeouts. He finished with a pitch count of 107. His 2.84 runs support was third-lowest in the National League, but a day after general manager John Mozeliak called out the offense's timid production, it came through with its biggest inning output (four runs) of the season.

==== Cardinals sweep Phillies, Wainwright leads pitchers ====
Adam Wainwright pitched five strong innings on June 11, in his team-leading 7th win (against 4 losses), giving up 2 runs, leading the team to a 6–5 win, in its first sweep of an opponent since May 8–10. Dexter Fowler hit a monster-length 3-run home run, giving the Cards a 3–2 lead after five innings, which they kept, although surviving a 2-run scare (after leading 6–3) in the ninth. Yadier Molina missed his third consecutive game. The team enjoys an off-day on Monday, June 12. The bats showed life, but it was against a Phillies' pitching staff that ranks last in ERA (5.02), versus the Cardinals that had been mostly listless at the plate during a winless seven-game road trip. The Cardinals arrived home on Friday (June 9) having been outscored, 42–20, while slashing .212/.285/.332 over the previous week. Little had looked right, and that led Cardinals GM John Mozeliak to put the group on notice. Production over the next four to six weeks, Mozeliak said, would likely determine the Cardinals' position at the non-waiver Trade Deadline at the end of July. "It's hard to win games when you're scoring 2.5 runs per game," Mozeliak said. "Certainly when you look at how we were thinking this offense would work, it hasn't done so. We can start at the top."

That would be with Matt Carpenter and Dexter Fowler, neither of whom has played up to expectation. Matheny sought to jostle things by flipping their spots in the lineup, and, for at least one weekend, it worked. Fowler's three-run homer out of the second spot in the lineup put the Cardinals ahead for good on Sunday (June 11), and it capped a three-game series in which he and Carpenter, hitting from in his familiar spot at leadoff, went 8-for-22 with five extra-base hits, four runs and five RBIs. All eight starting position players reached base at least once on Sunday. In both Friday and Saturday's (June 10) win, seven of the eight did so. The offense tallied 27 hits and 16 runs in all. Its 13 combined runs scored in the final two games represented the most the Cardinals have scored in consecutive games in more than a month.

==== DeJong optioned to AAA, M Gonzalez and Tuivailala recalled for DH, Peralta released ====
2B Paul DeJong was optioned to AAA on June 12. LHP Marco Gonzales was recalled, as was RHP Sam Tuivailala for the June 13 split double-header, which temporarily gives the team 26 on the active roster. 3B Jhonny Peralta was given his release after the Cardinals could not find another team interested in him after his designated for assignment. The club will pay the remainder of his $10 million salary. Gonzalez will be making his first start since 2015, from injury and returned after Tommy John surgery in May.

==== Cards-Brewers split DH ====
The Cardinals and Milwaukee Brewers split their split-DH on June 13, and no change in their standings. In the first game (1:15pm), Jose Martinez had his first multi-HR game in slugging two homers, driving in three runs. It meant more than usual for him, because his mom was there to see it. Lance Lynn pitched five strong innings, in a 6–0 shutout of the first-place Brewers. Lynn got his first win (5–3) since May 5, allowing only three hits, striking out eight, but walking four. He had 95 pitches on a 95-degree day at Busch. Chad Huffman, pinch-hitting for Lynn, got his first major-league hit since 2010, with his first career triple. LHP Tyler Lyons recorded his first major-league save, pitching the last three innings. The Cardinals' bullpen blew another lead and lost the nightcap, 8–5, giving them no advance on the Brewers for the day, with two more games to play against them in the next two days. Marco Gonzales started for the first time since 2015, but could only go 3.1 innings, giving up six hits, five runs on three HRs, walking none, striking out two.

==== Wong back on DL, DeJong recalled ====
2B Kolten Wong was back on the DL, before the June 15 game with a right triceps strain. Paul DeJong was recalled. Wong was taken out of the June 15 game prior to the sixth inning. He came off the DL on June 9, recovering from a left elbow injury, missing 13 games from May 27 – June 8.

==== Another flurry of roster moves to right a sinking ship ====
Before the June 25 Sunday Night Baseball game on ESPN, the Cardinals announced another flurry of moves designed to right a sinking ship after losing three straight to a season-low, seven-below-.500 mark of 33–40 (.452). The Cardinals recalled OF Randal Grichuk and RHP-reliever Mike Mayers from AAA, purchased the contract of 1B Luke Voit, 26,–a St. Louis native (Lafayette High School) making his major-league debut, optioned 1B Chad Huffman, and DL'ed OF Dexter Fowler (right heel spur), and LH-reliever Kevin Siegrist (cervical spine sprain). In 70 games with AAA-Memphis, Voit hit .322/.406/.561 (.967 OPS), with 23 doubles, 12 home runs, and 45 RBIs, before his debut. He serves as a backup to first baseman Matt Carpenter, and as a pinch-hitter off the bench.

==== DeJong switched to SS ====
After his 20th game playing 2B, Paul DeJong was switched to SS. He played SS for four games prior to his switch on June 27 (June 6, 17, 21, and 24).

==== Díaz optioned, Mejia recalled, A. Reyes to 60-day DL ====
Before the June 28 game against the Arizona Diamondbacks (50–28, .641, 2nd in NL West), the Cardinals optioned the struggling hitting-and-fielding SS Aledmys Díaz to AAA, purchased the contract of utility infielder Alex Mejia, and cleared the 40-man spot for Mejia by transferring starter RHP Alex Reyes to the 60-day DL. Díaz' OPS+ of 80 is 54 points lower than it was a year ago, and his slugging percentage has dropped from .510 to .396. He has struck out more frequently, walked less often, and not shown the same discipline that made him so successful last year. Díaz has swung and missed at 14% of the pitches outside the strike zone. That's five percentage points higher than last year. His .260 batting average would be much lower if not for his ability to beat out 21 infield hits. His minus-9 Defensive Runs Saved ranked second worst in the Majors among players with at least 250 innings played at short. Matheny said the Cardinals will prioritize work for Díaz at short in Memphis, though getting him exposure at other infield spots hadn't been ruled out. With Díaz gone, the Cardinals expected to give rookie Paul DeJong a heavy dose of work at short. Greg Garcia and Mejia, who is considered an above-average defensive shortstop, will also be options. Mejia, a fourth-round Draft pick in 2012, has fluctuated between AA Springfield and AAA Memphis for the last three seasons. The 26-year-old hit .251/.305/.366 in 63 AA games this year before earning a promotion to AAA, where he batted .263/.333/.289 in 11 games. He made his major league debut on June 29, playing 2B.

==== Cardinals promote GM Mozeliak to Pres of BB Ops; Mike Girsch new GM ====
On June 30, the Cardinals promoted GM John Mozeliak to the new position of President of Baseball Operations, and Assistant GM Mike Girsch to be the new GM. Mozeliak was hired as GM on October 31, 2007. Mozeliak's promotion continues a trend across baseball of how personnel departments are now structured, giving one person the power of overseeing baseball operations while also retaining a GM position. Other teams who use such a structure include the Chicago Cubs, Los Angeles Dodgers, Cleveland Indians, Oakland Athletics and the Tampa Bay Rays. Mozeliak is still expected to oversee the club's baseball operations decisions and remain heavily involved in the department. Girsch joined the Cardinals in 2006, when they also won the World Series, as coordinator of amateur scouting, and he later spent three years in the baseball development department before being promoted. Both will receive contract extensions through 2020.

==== Cardinals played more high-leverage moments than any other team ====
Through games of June 30, the Cardinals have played in more high-leverage moments than any other major-league team. The first time the team scored five runs in one inning did not occur until its 69th game of the season. The second time came on June 30 with a five-run fourth inning against the Arizona Diamondbacks, in a 10–4 win. According to Fangraphs' leverage index, no team has played under more stress this season than St. Louis. The Cardinals also entered Friday (June 30) tied with the Phillies for the highest percentage of plate appearances (20.7%) in high-leverage spots. Forty-three of the Cardinals' games have been decided by two runs or fewer, whereas Friday marked the 22nd time this year that the margin was at least five. All those close games highlight why the team's defense and baserunning continue to come under scrutiny. Little mistakes have big consequences when there's no wiggle room. After the July 1 win (2–1) over the Washington Nationals, the Cardinals now have 44 games of their 80 played decided by two runs or fewer.

=== July ===
==== Alex Mejia gets first hit, HR in Wacha birthday win ====
Starting off July in a game broadcast by Fox, the Cardinals won the three-game series (after besting them 8–1 on June 30) against the #1 team in the NL East, the Washington Nationals (47–33, .588), with a 2–1 win. SS, but playing 2B Alex Mejia, recorded his first major-league hit, and later added his first HR, to support Michael Wacha's win on Wacha'a 26th birthday. Holding the Nationals to four hits, Wacha struck out a season-high nine over a 94-pitch, six-inning outing. The Nationals weren't able to advance a runner to third against him. Washington starter Gio González was just as stingy, as he limited the Cardinals to two hits over seven innings. But he was clipped for a two-out run, driven in by Mejia, in the second inning. Mejia padded the 1–0 lead by blasting a first-pitch home run to open the eighth. The insurance proved to be necessary, too. Trevor Rosenthal, who was being given another look as a closer, allowed Washington's first run and loaded the bases with a two-out walk. Cardinals manager Mike Matheny then turned to Matt Bowman, who notched his first career save by freezing Adrian Sanchez on a full-count fastball in Sanchez's first Major League at-bat. After Paul DeJong extended the second inning by drawing only his second walk in 104 plate appearances, Mejia smacked a single up the middle to drive home Luke Voit, who had earlier beaten out a potential inning-ending double play. Mejia, who was making his second career start, had been hitless in his first three Major League at-bats. In addition to Bowman earning his first save and Mejia tallying his first hits, several other Cardinals reached notable numbers on Saturday: With a fourth-inning single, Yadier Molina extended his hitting streak to 16 games, tying a career high; only Ted Simmons has a longer streak by a Cardinals' catcher with 19 games, Wacha tied Steve Carlton as the second-fastest Cardinals' pitcher to reach 500 strikeouts by getting there in his 106th game, (Lance Lynn, 101 G). Mgr. Matheny earned managerial win No. 500, making him the second-quickest manager in franchise history to reach that mark, achieving the milestone in his 890th game, for a .562 win percentage. He started the 2017 season with a 461–349 (.569) managerial record. Billy Southworth hit 500 wins in 766 games, (.653).

==== Carlos Martínez and Yadier Molina named to All-Star Game roster ====
Carlos Martínez and Yadier Molina were named to the All-Star Game reserves (on a July 2 ESPN televised report), in Miami on July 11. Molina made the All-Star team for seven consecutive seasons before having that streak broken last year. Molina leads all NL catchers with 66 starts and 580 innings caught. He also ranks among the top four in total hits (69), home runs (nine) and RBIs (35). He is slashing .273/.308/.409 on the season, entered Sunday riding a 16-game hitting streak. It's his second hitting streak of that length this year. Martinez is a second-time All-Star, though he'll be looking for his first appearance when he travels to Miami. Martinez did not pitch in the All-Star Game two summers ago (2015) after winning a spot on the roster through the Final Vote competition. Martinez entered Sunday's (July 2) showdown against Max Scherzer (Washington Nationals) ranked fourth in the NL in ERA (2.88), second in opponents' batting average (.199), fourth in WHIP (1.07) and sixth in strikeouts per nine innings (10.24). This marks the second consecutive season that the Cardinals have placed two players on the All-Star team. All-Star Game rosters list

==== Carlos Martínez vs. Max Scherzer ====
On the night (July 2) he was named to the All-Star team, Carlos Martínez (6–6, 2.88 ERA, 1 Shutout, 121 strikeouts, 10.2 per 9 IP; 1.072 WHIP; .199/.275/.325 opp. slash and .600 opp OPS) pitched against St. Louis native, and Parkway Central High School graduate Max Scherzer (Washington Nationals, in a nationally televised ESPN Sunday Night Baseball Game of the Week. Scherzer is the best pitcher in the NL in terms of ERA (2.06; 212 ERA+), strikeouts (151; 12.0 per 9 IP) and WHIP (0.783). His opp. slash is .164/.227/.292 and .520 opp OPS. Scherzer also has two complete games this year. Looking for his 10th win (9–5), the Chesterfield, MO native and University of Missouri alum has been fantastic of late. He's allowed more than one earned run just once in his last seven starts and reached double-digit strikeouts in six of those games. Scherzer ranks first in right-handed-hitters' batting average against, but Martinez is right behind him in second place (Scherzer, .125; Martinez, .171). Scherzer was drafted by the St. Louis Cardinals in the 43rd round (1,291st overall) in the 2003 Major League Baseball draft, but did not sign, and instead attended the University of Missouri. He was then drafted again in 2006 by the Arizona Diamondbacks, this time in the 1st round as the 11th overall pick. He was Mizzou's first-ever 1st round MLB pick. On January 9, 2012, it was announced that Scherzer would be one of six new inductees to the University of Missouri Intercollegiate Athletics Hall of Fame. While at Mizzou, he won Big 12 Pitcher of the Year in 2005.[Wikipedia entry for Max Scherzer]

Scherzer and the Nationals beat the Cardinals in an easy 7–2 win. Scherzer (10–5) pitched 7 innings, giving up only 3 hits and no runs, lowering his ERA to an NL-leading 1.94. He struck out seven his first time through the Cardinals' order. He finished the night with 12, marking the 10th time this season—and 59th of his career—that Scherzer reached the double-digit strikeout mark in a game. Scherzer was supported early by Bryce Harper, who spoiled the night of All-Star starter Carlos Martínez (6–7). Harper crushed a slider over the right-field wall to give the Nationals a two-run lead in the first inning, before golfing a third-inning pitch for another two-run homer, hie 13th career multi-homer game, to punctuate a three-run third. Martinez allowed as many runs on Sunday (five) as he had in his previous five starts combined, with his ERA ballooning to 3.15. Tommy Pham hit a two-run home run (10th), in the eighth inning (Enny Romero) for the only Cardinals runs.

==== Halfway through season record ====
At the half-way point through 2017 after the July 2 game, the Cardinals are 39–42 (.481), in third place in the NL Central, 3.5 G behind the Milwaukee Brewers (44–40, .524), and 1.5 G behind the Chicago Cubs (41–41, .500).

==== Luke Weaver recalled, Mike Mayers optioned ====
The #3 prospect in the Cardinals' organization, RHP Luke Weaver was recalled before the game on July 3. Mike Mayers was optioned. Arguably the most dominant pitcher in the organization's Minor League system this year, Weaver made eight starts in 2016. He will not be held back as a long reliever, but will instead be considered a relief option for any situation. He was due to start for Triple-A Memphis today, is rested and ready to pitch as soon as he's needed. At Memphis, he was 7–1 with a 1.93 ERA in 11 starts. He's walked 13, struck out 60, and allowed three home runs in 56 innings. Most recently, he posted a 1.59 ERA in four June starts. Weaver made his Major League debut last August, and finished 1–4 with a 5.70 ERA and 1.596 WHIP. He opened his big league career by allowing three or fewer runs in each of his first six starts, but was pulled from the rotation after two abbreviated mid-September performances. The #1 and 32 prospects are RHP Alex Reyes, and C Carson Kelly.

==== Cardinals offense erupts for 14 runs ====
The offense had their biggest game this season on July 3, with a 14–6 rout (BOX SCORE) of the Miami Marlins, at Busch Stadium. With more hits in the first three innings than they had in their last two games combined, the Cardinals pummeled starter Jeff Locke and held on for the win. The Cardinals had their most productive first inning (four runs) of the season, and sent 12 batters to the plate during a seven-run third inning that chased Locke. By the end of that inning, everyone in the Cardinals' lineup had reached base at least once and eight different batters had scored a run. Luke Voit, crushed his first Major League home run (two-runs in the 8th inning) and his first four RBIs. Tommy Pham (batting second) was a perfect 3-for-3 including a triple, 2 RBIs, plus two walks reaching base safely every time at-bat. Yadier Molina also went 3-for-3 with 3 RBIs. The offense has scored 61 runs over the team's last nine games, of which the Cardinals have won seven. Adam Wainwright had a rocky fifth inning but finished it before being pulled, giving up 8 hits and 6 runs (all earned) for his ninth win, and a 6–1 record at home. He also contributed at-bat with a two-run single. He is now batting .226 with a .678 OPS.

==== July 4 record ====
The Cardinals were 103–100–2 (.507) on July 4 games in their history before today's loss. They played a double header every year between 1927 and 1950. The July 3 game started a stretch of 14 consecutive games against sub-.500 teams (FL, NYM, PIT, NYM). After the July 4 loss, they are 23–16 (.590) against teams below .500.

==== Fowler activated, Jose Martinez optioned ====
The Cardinals activated CF Dexter Fowler before the game on July 7, optioning OF José_Martínez. Fowler missed 12 games due to a right heel spur from June 25 – July 6. He ranks 2nd among St. Louis players with 40 runs scored, and his 35 RBI rank 4th. Fowler is batting .245 with 10 doubles, four triples and 13 home runs (2nd among StL hitters). Martinez opened the season on the Major League roster for the first time in his career. The right-handed hitter batted .280 with five home runs and 17 RBI this season, and has appeared in 50 games. Martinez has made 26 starts and has two outfield assists, coming in back-to-back games April 17 and 18 vs. Pittsburgh. Martinez missed 17 games (May 7–28) earlier this season with a left groin injury.

==== Four Home Runs not enough to win ====
The July 7 game saw four Cardinals hit Home Runs, but they were all solo shots, and it wasn't enough for Carlos Martínez (6–8) as he gave up five runs in five innings for the second consecutive games, allowing seven hits, losing 6–5 to the New York Mets. Randal Grichuk, Paul DeJong, Dexter Fowler, and Jedd Gyorko all homered, but the team lost for the fourth time in six games. Winner Jacob deGrom is the first pitcher to allow four home runs against the Cardinals and win since Robin Roberts in 1955. Preacher Roe of the Brooklyn Dodgers also accomplished that feat in 1953. The Cardinals hit back-to-back home runs for the third game this season, and hit two sets of back-to-back homers in the same game for the ninth time in club history. The last time that happened was on May 2, 2016, against the Phillies. The last time the Cardinals hit four home runs in a game on two sets of back-to-back home runs that were all solo homers was May 7, 2012, at Arizona.

==== DeJong, Pham, Voit get hot at the break ====
The Cardinals are heading into the All-Star break (43–45, .489) having won or tied their past four series. They are tied with the Cubs for 2nd place, 5.5 games behind the Milwaukee Brewers (50–41, .549). After 88 games, the team has scored 402 runs, while giving up 389. In 2016, they scored 779, giving up 712. The players who have helped lead them to their recent success, however, could not have been predicted 88 games ago. In the Cardinals' 6–0 victory over the Mets on Sunday (July 9) at Busch Stadium, Tommy Pham and rookies Paul DeJong and Luke Voit accounted for the club's three home runs and four of its six runs.

Paul DeJong, the starting shortstop, stepped up against the Mets, breaking records across the three games. In the series, he went 9-for-12 (.750) with three home runs, five doubles and four RBIs. He is in the midst of a six-game hitting streak, and his eight extra-base hits in the series are the most by a Cardinals' player in a three-game series in the modern era (post-1900). He has 10 Doubles, nine homers, 20 RBIs, and is hitting .313/.331/.602 (.932 OPS, 139 OPS+) at the break.

Tommy Pham, who hit his 11th home run Sunday, has 11 stolen bases. He became the first Cardinal since Albert Pujols in 2009 to have at least 10 homers and 10 stolen bases before the break. He is hitting .299/.386/.510 (.895 OPS, 134 OPS+) with 8 Doubles and a Triple, with 34 RBIs.

Luke Voit, a St. Louis native, has also posted impressive numbers, hitting .316/.366/.684 (1.050 OPS, 168 OPS+) in 38 at-bats in 14 games. He has five doubles and eight RBIs in July, including his four-RBI day July 3 against the Marlins.

==== Yadier Molina hits HR in All-Star Game ====
Yadier Molina got the NL its only run in the All-Star Game on July 11, when he hit a home run in the sixth inning off Ervin Santana (Minn. Twins) to tie the game at 1. But the NL lost 1–2 in 10 inn. Reggie Smith was the last Cardinal to hit an All-Star Game home run in the 1974 game. He became the oldest catcher to hit a home run in an All-Star Game, two days before his 35th birthday (July 13), passing Yogi Berra.

==== "Take Me Out to the Ball Game" ====
The famous baseball song, Take Me Out to the Ball Game was first performed in a baseball park: Sportsman's Park before Game 4 of the 1934 World Series by the famous Gashouse Gang players Pepper Martin and his Marvelous Musical Mississippi Mudcats Band. The song was written in 1908, with words by Jack Norworth and music from Albert Von Tilzer. Ironically, neither had attended a baseball game. It was the #1 song for 1908, selling over 6 million sheet copies. Major League Baseball realized that Ladies Days, when women were admitted to the ballpark for free, were no longer necessary. In 1909, the National League banned the practice, assuming women would now attend on a regular basis. "Katie Casey was baseball mad; Had the fever and had it bad; Just to root for the home town crew ... On a Saturday, her young beau called to see if she'd like to go, To see a show but Miss Kate said "No, I'll tell you what you can do." That leads into the iconic chorus that everyone sings throughout the summer.

==== Wong and Siegrist activated, Mejia and Weaver optioned ====
At the break on Thu. July 13, the Cardinals activated 2B Kolten Wong and LHP Kevin Siegrist, optioning SS Alex Mejia and RHP Luke Weaver.

==== Grichuck on DL, Jose Martinez recalled ====
Before the game on July 14, LF Randal Grichuk was placed on the DL from a lower back strain. OF José Martínez was recalled.

==== Piscotty on DL, Sierra recalled ====
Before the game on July 15, RF Stephen Piscotty was placed on the DL from a right groin strain. OF Magneuris Sierra was recalled from AA Springfield.

==== Wacha throws first complete game, shutout ====
Michael Wacha threw his first complete game and a 5–0 shutout win against the New York Mets at Citi Field on July 18. He gave up only three hits, one walk, and allowing just one runner to reach third base, in the ninth inning with two outs. He pitched after an 11-day layoff to give his troublesome right shoulder additional rest. He threw a career-high 119 pitches. He started the ninth inning at 97 pitches. The shutout was the first by a Cardinals' pitcher on the road since Shelby Miller on June 7, 2014. Since posting an 8.17 ERA over a six-game stretch that had some calling for his removal from the rotation, Wacha is 4–0 with a 1.01 ERA in four starts. His strikeout rate has jumped, and he's found the cutter to be a put-away pitch. After notching five strikeouts on it over his first 14 appearances, Wacha has logged eight in his last three. Wacha garnered 12 outs on his fastball, eight with his cutter, four via the changeup and three with the curve.

==== Carson Kelly promoted, Zach Duke and Randal Grichuk activated ====
The top catching prospect in baseball and the #2 Cardinals prospect, Carson Kelly, 23, was promoted to the majors before the game on July 21. He hit .283/.375/.459 with 10 home runs and 41 RBIs in 68 games for Triple-A Memphis this season. He made his Major League debut last season, and went 2-for-13 with a double in 10 games for St. Louis. LF Randal Grichuk was activated from the disabled list, as was LHP Zach Duke from the 60-day DL. Grichuk is batting .215 with nine home runs and 30 RBIs in 61 games for the Cardinals this season. Duke is a 12-year MLB veteran, making nine Minor League rehab appearances before being activated, throwing nine scoreless innings. RHP Sam Tuivailala was optioned to AAA-Memphis, as was OF Magneuris Sierra to AA-Springfield. To make room, C Eric Fryer was designated for assignment, with Duke taking Fryer's spot on the 40-man roster.

==== Cardinals trade LHP Marco Gonzales for OF prospect Tyler O'Neill ====
Before the game on July 21, the Cardinals traded LHP Marco Gonzales for a power-hitting #75 prospect in baseball ( #4 Cardinals ) Tyler O'Neill, 22, of the Seattle Mariners. Both players were products of the 2013 MLB Draft, with Gonzales taken in the first round, and O'Neill by Seattle in the third. O'Neill had 14 homers in his past 19 games at Triple-A Tacoma and was batting .244/.328/.479 with 19 homers, 21 doubles and 56 RBIs in 93 games this season. His 19 home runs ranked eighth in the Pacific Coast League. He was the Mariners' Minor League Player of the Year last season when he batted .293 with 24 home runs and 102 RBIs at the Double-A level. GM John Mozeliak said, "It adds to our offensive depth. [It's] not that we're not proud of our outfield depth, but we do think this offensive profile is unique. [He has] middle-of-the-order potential." O'Neill will report to Triple-A Memphis, where he'll play alongside another Cardinals outfield prospect, Harrison Bader. Gonzales' status as an out-of-options player next year left the Cardinals uncertain of how they'd find a fit for him on the Major League roster.

==== Fowler on DL, Harrison Bader promoted ====
On July 25, Dexter Fowler was placed on the DL from a left wrist strain, and promoted their No. 6 prospect OF Harrison Bader, 23, from AAA-Memphis. He is in the lineup, and will make his major league debut. He hit .297/.354 with 19 home runs and slugging .517 with 48 RBIs, stealing 9 bases in 350 at-bats. He was their third-round pick in 2015. Fowler is hitting .241/.333/.452, with 29 extra-base hits and 37 RBIs in 333 plate appearances over 81 games this season. Memphis outfielder Chad Huffman was outrighted and subsequently granted his unconditional release.

==== Wainwright on DL, retroactive to July 23 ====
Before the July 25 game, starting pitcher Adam Wainwright, 35, was placed on the 10-day DL, retroactive to July 23, due to mid-back tightness. The team will announce a corresponding roster move tomorrow. Wainwright is leading the Cardinals with 11 wins and has posted a 4.89 ERA in his 20 games started, striking out 95 batters in 110.1 innings pitched. This marks just the fourth time in his career that Wainwright has been disabled: 2008 for right middle finger sprain, 2011 for right elbow Tommy John surgery, and 2015 for a ruptured right Achilles. The three-time All-Star owns a career mark of 145–81 with a 3.27 ERA in 340 games pitched, ranking 5th on the Cardinals all-time wins list. He has 1,582 strikeouts as a Cardinals' pitcher, ranking second behind Bob Gibson (3,117).

RHP Mike Mayers was recalled on July 26, as the temporary help from Wainwright's DL.

==== Bader gets first hit, run ====
Harrison Bader, scarcely 12 hours after his call-up, recorded his first major league hit, a double to open the ninth inning that turned into a run that decided the 3–2 win over Colorado Rockies (now 58–44 .569), who hold a 4 1/2 game lead over the Cubs for one of the two Wild Card spots. Paul DeJong gave the Cards the lead with a two-run home run in the first, his seventh for the month that matched the most by a Cardinals' rookie in July, and is tied for second place among NL home run leaders in the month. Starter Lance Lynn has now given up one run in his last 25 1/3 innings, lowering his ERA to 3.21 (with the Cardinals overall at 3.83, third-best in NL L.A. Dodgers 3.15 and Arizona Diamondbacks 3.52 in NL West); and opposing batters hitting a team-lowest .210 against him (min. 25 IP). Reliever Matt Bowman blew a save (giving up a solo home run to tie it at 2–2 in the eighth inning), which is the 15th for the team, fourth-most in the NL. DeJong is one of only two players to ever hit double-digit home runs for both the Cardinals, and Triple-A Memphis in the same season. He joins Rick Ankiel, who did so in 2007. DeJong has 13 with each team, while Ankiel spent the majority of 2007 with Memphis, hitting 32 home runs there, and 11 with St. Louis. The win kept the Cardinals after 100 games (49–51 .490) four games back of the Milwaukee Brewers (54–48 .529) in the wild NL Central, playing leap-frog over the Cubs (52–47 .525), who are one-half game behind.

==== Luke Weaver recalled, Mike Mayers optioned ====
RHP Luke Weaver was recalled on July 27, and recalled from yesterday RHP Mike Mayers was optioned. Weaver is the No. 64 overall prospect in the Majors, and the Cardinals' fourth-best prospect. Weaver will make his first start in 2017. In two relief appearances with St. Louis this season, Weaver has allowed three hits and no runs over three innings. As a starter in AAA Memphis, he has excelled this year, going 9–1 in 13 starts with a 1.91 ERA. He made eight starts in nine appearances in 2016 (1–4, 5.70 ERA).

==== Cardinals set single-game attendance record at Busch Stadium III ====
The Cardinals set a Busch Stadium III attendance record on July 29, with an announced crowd of 48,052. That figure surpassed all previous attendance marks—even those from the postseason and All-Star Game—at the 12-year-old ballpark. The previous record was 47,925 on May 14, 2017.

==== Cardinals hold at non-waiver trade deadline ====
The Cardinals decided to make no changes by the non-waiver trade deadline on July 31, 3pm CDT. That means that the Cardinals will enter the final two months of the season with Lance Lynn still a member of their rotation, and an overcrowded outfield. The latter is expected to be addressed during the off-season. As for Lynn, he'll play out the rest of this year as a pending free agent. The Cardinals have not initiated extension talks with the 30-year-old right-hander, and GM John Mozeliak confirmed the organization will "table all of that until the year end". Mozeliak added that momentum never picked up among the teams that had inquired about Lynn's availability. The Cardinals can still net a compensatory Draft pick—which would come after Compensation Round B in 2018—if they make Lynn a qualifying offer and he declines. The value of the qualifying offer is expected to be around $18 million for one year. The club entered the day (off-day) at 52–53, sitting in third-place in the NL Central, 4 1/2 games behind the Cubs, and 2 games behind the Brewers.
Teams can still make trades in August, but with restrictions. Reporter Jayson Stark outlines the waiver rules.

=== August ===
==== Piscotty activated, Bader optioned ====
On August 1, before a crucial series against the second-place Milwaukee Brewers, the Cardinals activated OF Stephen Piscotty from the DL, and optioned OF Harrison Bader to AAA. Piscotty missed 16 games after hitting .236/.348/.371 with a 90 OPS+ in 69 games. Bader got his first hit and scored the game-winning run in his first game, hitting .286/.348/.381 (6 for 21) .729 OPS and a 92 OPS+ with 2 doubles, two walks, and nine strikeouts in his six games.

==== Paul DeJong wins NL Rookie of the Month Award for July ====
After batting .298/.347/.638 (.985 OPS) with 6 home runs and 16 RBI's in the month of July, Paul DeJong was named the NL Rookie of the Month on his 24th birthday (August 2). He was the first Cardinals' player to win the award since Kolten Wong in May 2014. Through the game on August 1, DeJong was hitting .281/.308/.558 (.865 OPS, 121 OPS+), with 14 home runs and 32 RBIs in 54 games and 208 plate appearances. Among rookies with at least 50 games played, only the Yankees' Aaron Judge and the Dodgers' Cody Bellinger have a higher slugging percentage than DeJong.

==== August injuries/transactions ====
On August 4, starting pitcher Luke Weaver was optioned to AAA, and for the fifth time this season, reliever Sam Tuivailala was recalled.

Adam Wainwright was activated before the August 6 game he pitched, missing two starts. LHP Kevin Siegrist was placed on the DL with left forearm tendinitis.

Before the August 7 game, OF Dexter Fowler was activated from the DL after missing 12 games. OF Stephen Piscotty was optioned to AAA Memphis.

After the showing problems with decreased velocity and command in the ninth inning of the August 16 game, reliever Trevor Rosenthal was placed on the 10-day DL from a right posterior elbow irritation. RHP Luke Weaver was recalled from AAA. Rosenthal was 11 for 13 in save opportunities, with a 3.40 ERA and 76 strikeouts in 47.2 innings.

Pitching only three innings with 55 pitches but decreased velocity on August 18, starter Adam Wainwright was placed on the DL from right elbow impingement. He was 12–5 with a 5.12 ERA. Opponent batters were hitting .283 against him. RHP Mike Mayers was recalled from AAA Memphis.

Before the August 19 game, the Cardinals promoted reliever Josh Lucas, 26, from AAA Memphis, to make his major league debut. To make room for him, RHP Mike Mayers was optioned to the Memphis. Lucas had been in the organization since the Cardinals took him in the 21st round of the 2010 MLB draft. He had a 3.34 ERA, 1.165 WHIP and 14 saves in 43 appearances at AAA, striking out 65, walking only nine in 56.2 innings. Sixteen of Lucas' appearances have been for one-plus innings. In his debut, Lucas gave up four hits, including a home run for his lone run allowed, walking none, striking out two in his two innings pitched.

On August 21, OF Stephen Piscotty remained with the team after his 26th-man callup for the 2017 MLB Little League Classic on August 20. 1B Luke Voit was optioned to make the active roster down to the usual 25.

Before the August 23 game, the Cardinals announced that RH reliever Trevor Rosenthal will have Tommy John surgery to repair a partially torn ulnar collateral ligament in his right elbow. Dr. Neal ElAttrache will perform the procedure next week. The surgery not only ends Rosenthal's season, but it will cost him much—and possibly all—of 2018 as well. He led the Majors with 93 saves from 2014 to 2015. The timing also complicates his move toward free agency, and it leaves the Cardinals without an obvious answer as to who will fill the ninth-inning void in his absence. He was to be arbitration-eligible for a third time this winter and due for a salary increase from the $6.4 million he's earning in 2017. It's a financial commitment the Cardinals won't want to make for a pitcher who may need the full season to recover from surgery. The club could choose to not tender Rosenthal a contract and try to re-sign him for a lesser amount, or under a Minor League contract, to retain control of him. The Cardinals transferred Rosenthal to the 60-day DL ending his season, while calling-up LH reliever Ryan Sherriff, 27, for his major-league debut later. He is 5–1, 3.19 ERA converting six-out-of-seven save opportunities at AAA-Memphis. Reliever Josh Lucas was optioned. Rosenthal was 3–4 with a 3.40 ERA, with 11 saves.

In the eighth inning of a 4–4 game, about to score the lead run from third base of the August 26 game against the Tampa Bay Rays, 3B Jedd Gyorko suffered a right hamstring strain. He was placed on the 10-day DL the next day. Gyorko was the team-leader with 64 RBIs, hitting .272 with 18 HRs in 114 games. Luke Voit was recalled from AAA.

==== Second consecutive game with go-ahead grand slam ====
For the first time in the Cardinals' long history, the team won consecutive games, on August 9–10, featuring a go-ahead grand slam. The 59th win of the season (against 56 losses, .513) for their sixth consecutive win, tied their longest win streak (May 5–10), and pushed the Cardinals to within one game of the first-place Cubs in the NL Central, passing the Brewers for second place, with 47 games remaining. Dexter Fowler slammed the Royals in the seventh inning on August 10 (8–6 win), when tied at 3–3, while Yadier Molina hit a grand slam in the sixth inning the previous night (8–5 win), after trailing 5–4. The game on August 9 featured Molina's slam coming one pitch after a cat, subsequently known as the "Rally Cat", ran into center field. The cat was picked up by a groundskeeper, who got scratched and clawed for his trouble. Molina's 387-foot homer was the fifth grand slam of his career, tying him with Tim McCarver for second all-time among Cardinals' catchers for grand slams. He needs two more to tie Ted Simmons. Because of Molina's key hit, the Cardinals moved closer in the chase for the NL Central. Fowler's slam (fifth in his career) was the Cardinals' third in their last five games, and his five RBIs in a game was his highest. He had scored a run in his last five games. The Rally Cat went missing after the game and the Cardinals released a statement: "We are hopeful someone will find the cat and contact us so we can properly care for it. Our grounds crew is working on developing a stray animal protocol to ensure the safety of both crew and animal should this happen again. In the meantime, the Cardinals are looking to scratch and claw their way back to the top of the division standings." The Rally Cat was found early on August 11, and transported to a veterinarian to be checked out, and eventually available for adoption. It was not a feral cat as initially thought. It is a medium haired tabby. It's still unknown if anyone in the Cardinals' organization will open their doors to the cat. Custody of the cat remains in dispute.

==== Cards in a virtual tie for first in NL Central ====
After the 6–5 win on August 12 (61–56, .521) and the Cubs' loss later that night (60–55, .522), the teams were in a virtual tie for first place in the NL Central. The August 12 win was the team's season-high eighth consecutive win. Carlos Martínez won his ninth game, and Paul DeJong hit his team-leading 17th home run for the deciding run in the seventh inning. The Cardinals' eight-game winning streak was their most since April 28 to May 5, 2015, and the longest of Matheny's managerial career. The Cards were five and one-half games back less than two weeks ago. DeJong's team-leading 17th home run came in his 64th game and 244th at-bat. He tied five other Cardinals for the seventh-most home runs by a rookie in Cardinals' history, with six of them coming in the seventh inning or later. He was slashing .291/.320/.566. Before the game on August 12, his 16 home runs in his first 63 games were second only to future Hall of Famer Albert Pujols' 20 in the same number of games in 2001. During the team's eight-game winning streak, DeJong 's ability and consistency played a pivotal role. He had at least one hit in all but one of those games, with three home runs and nine RBIs over that stretch. Combined with the 13 homers he hit in 48 games with the AAA Memphis, DeJong has 30 home runs this season. Adam Wainwright's hit in the August 11 game drove in his 11th RBI, which led all MLB pitchers. Compared to the team's previous game on August 11 for their seventh consecutive win (8–5), the six runs scored on August 12 were the lowest from the previous six games, when eight runs or more were scored. That streak was the first time since April 11–16, 2011, tying the franchise record. The club also achieved the feat Sept. 9–15, 1922.

However, following the win, the Cardinals would lose three straight and five of their next seven games. The Cubs, in the same span, won six of eight games to extend the lead over the Cardinals to 3.5 games as of August 21.

==== Paul DeJong becomes fourth Cards' rookie to hit 20 HRs ====
Paul DeJong became only the fourth Cardinals' rookie to hit 20 home runs, doing so in only his 70th game on August 19. Albert Pujols (37 in 2001), Chris Duncan (22 in '06), and Ray Jablonski (21 in 1953) previously accomplished the feat. He also has 17 doubles, 48 RBIs in 269 AB, hitting .305/.336/.591 with a .927 OPS.

==== Ryan Sherriff makes debut ====
LH reliever Ryan Sherriff made his major-league debut against the Tampa Bay Rays on August 25. He pitched three scoreless innings, registering four strikeouts, while scattering two hits. But the Cards fell 3–7 to the Rays, with their eighth loss in 11 games, remaining 4 1/2 games behind the Cubs in the National League Central and five back of the Rockies for the NL's second Wild Card spot.

==== Matt Carpenter donates to Hurricane Harvey relief ====
On August 29, Galveston, Texas native and Houston-area resident, Matt Carpenter, announced a personal donation of $10,000 for each home run he hits until the end of the season, to the relief efforts in the tragedy of Hurricane Harvey, which smashed into Rockport, Texas (just south of Houston) as a Category 4 hurricane, on August 25, with wind gusts up to 132 mph (212 km/h). Adam Wainwright and the Cardinals' owner William DeWitt, Jr., also pledged the same $10,000 per Carpenter home run, totaling $30,000 for each one Carpenter hits. Carpenter has hit 17 this year through the 130 games played. Randal Grichuk said he has remained in constant contact with his parents, who still live in his hometown of Rosenberg, Texas, a suburb southwest of downtown Houston. In the first game after his pledge, that same evening Carpenter hit a home run, his 18th (a 10–2 win), which gave $30,000 to the relief efforts.

==== Leake traded to Seattle ====
Starting RH pitcher Mike Leake was traded to the Seattle Mariners on August 30, on the eve of the waiver trade deadline (August 31), $750,000 in international cap space as well as cash considerations, for a minor league shortstop Rayder Ascanio, 21. Prior to this deadline, a player is eligible to play in post-season games, as Leake now is, should Seattle earn a Wild Card spot. Leake, 29, signed a five-year contract with the Cards in December 2015, and he has three years and $48 million remaining on his deal after 2017, with a mutual $18 million option, or a $5 million buyout in 2021. The contract, which included a full no-trade clause, was no problem as Leake waived it to help facilitate the trade, according to reports. The Cardinals are picking up $17 million of the remaining $53 million money on Leake's contract. Leake began the year red-hot, going 3–1 with a 1.35 ERA in five April outings, before seeing his ERA increase in each month of the season. The right-hander is 0–3 with an 8.88 ERA and a .375 opponents batting average in five starts in August. He is 7–12 with a 4.21 ERA in 26 starts for the Cards this season, after going 9–12 with a 4.69 ERA in 30 starts in 2016. Leake is 80–76 with a 4.02 ERA in 223 career appearances (228 starts). The shortstop received by the Cardinals is a switch-hitter, signed out of Venezuela with the Mariners' organization since 2012. Ascanio hit .217/.295/.355 with a .649 OPS in 111 Minor League games this season, and he will be added to the Cardinals' Class A Advanced Palm Beach Cardinals roster for the remainder of this year. The #3 prospect in the Cardinals' organization, RHP Jack Flaherty, 21, will take Leake's place in the rotation, starting on September 1, making his major league debut. He is three years removed after high school, now with the AAA Memphis Redbirds.

==== Siegrist DFA, John Gant recalled ====
LH reliever Kevin Siegrist was DFA on August 31, after activating him from the DL, making room for RH reliever John Gant, recalled from AAA, who will take the roster spot that Mike Leake vacated after his trade. Gant, 25, has a 3.83 ERA with 99 strikeouts in 103 1/3 innings over 18 starts for the Memphis Redbirds this season. He was acquired last December from Atlanta in the Jaime Garcia trade. His lone appearance with the big league club this year came on June 6, when he allowed the Cincinnati Reds two runs on three hits over 3 1/3 innings. Siegrist was in the midst of a tough season with a 4.98 ERA over 34 1/3 innings and a 13.3% walk rate that ranked 192nd among 203 relievers with at least 30 innings. He had been battling left forearm tendinitis as well. Siegrist, who was under team control for two more seasons, had fallen out of favor as a top left-hander in the Cardinals' bullpen, with Left-handers slugging a career-best .420 against him this year. He was claimed off waivers by the Philadelphia Phillies on September 2.

=== September ===
==== Apr–Aug 1,2-run games record ====
At the end of August, the team is 67–66 (.504), and had an 18–25 (.419) record in one-run games. They are 9–12 (.429) record in 2-run games. For 1- or 2-run games, the team is 27–37 (.422). The Cardinals have 7 players with 15+ HR's, tops among NL teams and T2nd in the majors, with Houston and Baltimore, trailing only the Texas (9 players). The Cardinals had a franchise record 8 players hit 15+ HR's last year, as they paced the NL with 225 home runs. They have scored 245 runs via the home run, giving up 231 that way. In total, the Cardinals have scored 631 runs, giving up 581.

==== Jack Flaherty makes ML debut ====
Starting RHP Jack Flaherty made his major league debut on September 1, at AT&T Park against the San Francisco Giants. He pitched a perfect first inning, striking out the first and third batters, and got the second on a fly ball. But, he gave up a two-run home run among five hits, in the second inning. Overall, he allowed five runs on eight hits over four innings with six strikeouts and one intentional walk. Harrison Bader also had a memorable night when he clubbed his first Major League home run in the third inning, a two-run blast that got the Cardinals on the scoreboard.

==== Rosters expand ====
The rosters expanded on September 1, and the Cardinals brought up from AAA-Memphis: OF Harrison Bader, 2B/SS Alex Mejia, C Alberto Rosario, plus RHP Sandy Alcántara from AA-Springfield Cardinals. Bader is the #5 prospect in the Cardinals' organization . Alcántara is particularly intriguing for the Cardinals, with his power arm, and is the #9 prospect in the Cardinals' organization . He will initially be used in relief. At AA-Springfield, he was 7–5 with a 4.31 ERA in 25 games (22 starts), and had 106 strikeouts with 54 walks in 125 1/3 innings. Alcántara held opponents to a .262 average this season, while relying primarily on a fastball that routinely clocked between 94 and 96 mph. That velocity, coupled with a hard curve and solid changeup, have the Cardinals salivating about Alcántara's prospects. He stands 6' 4", a lean 170 pounds (77 kg)

==== Alcántara makes ML debut ====
RH reliever Sandy Alcántara made his major-league debut on September 3, in a 7–3 win over the lowly San Francisco Giants (54–85). He pitched 0.2 innings, giving up two hits, a run (home run), one walk, and one strikeout.

==== Carlos Martínez throws second shutout ====
Carlos Martínez threw his second shutout of the season on September 4 against the San Diego Padres. He joins Ervin Santana (3, Minnesota Twins), and Corey Kluber (2, Cleveland Indians), as the only other MLB pitchers to record at least two shutouts. Martinez struck out 10, walked three, giving up only three singles, with no runners reaching second base. He threw 109 pitches, 76 for strikes. His 183 innings pitched in 2017, ranks second among all NL starters. Opponent batters are hitting .228 against him, third-best of the Cardinals' starters. Lance Lynn is first at .211 and Luke Weaver second at .220.

==== Cardinals acquire reliever Juan Nicasio ====
The Cardinals made a rare September trade when they acquired Philadelphia Phillies RH reliever and setup man Juan Nicasio, 31, for minor league infielder Eliezer Alvarez on September 5. He won't be eligible for a postseason roster should the Cards advance to the playoffs. He has made a NL-high 67 appearances this year, 65 with the Pittsburgh Pirates, who put him on waivers. He posted a 2.79 ERA and a 1.09 WHIP over 61 1/3 innings this season. He's struck out 16, walked 18, and held opponents to a .218 batting average. Nicasio's 21 Holds rank as the fifth most in the NL.

==== Attendance passes 3 million ====
The year's attendance passed 3 million (3,026,081) for the 14th consecutive year at the September 10 game, the 71st home game (39–32; Road 35–37). An average per game of 42,621. Their highest attendance year was in 2007, when they received 3,552,180 for an average of 43,854.

==== NL Central race going down to the wire ====
With 19 games to play over the next 20 days including the September 12 game, the Cardinals (75–68, .524) are only two games behind the Cubs (77–66) for the division lead, and the Brewers (75–69) a shade behind in third place. The Cubs have lost six of their last eight, while the Cardinals have won seven of their last eight, cutting five games off the Cubs' lead. They are 8–2 in September, with only the Cleveland Indians better, with an amazing 19 consecutive games won, now 88–56 (.611; 40–29 Home, 48–27 Road), 13 1/2 ahead in the AL Central. No team has gotten better starting pitching in this stretch than the Cardinals: 1.91 ERA (Cleveland starters have a 1.97 ERA over the same time period). The Cardinals were 33–40 after the June 24 game. Since then, they are 42–28 (.600). The Brewers play 11 of their final 18 games against teams with a losing record, and the other seven are against the Cubs and Cardinals. The two NL Wild Card berths may not provide a safety net. The Arizona D-backs (83–61) are cruising toward one, and the Colorado Rockies (79–65) lead the Cardinals by 3 1/2 games in the race for the other. The Cubs have seven games remaining against the Cardinals, and four against the Brewers. The Cardinals finish the season with three home games against the Brewers, but they also play the Reds and Pirates nine times.

==== Gyorko activated ====
3B Jedd Gyorko activated before the September 13 game, can pinch-hit, but will take it slow with base-running after he suffered a right hamstring strain during the August 26 game. He lost his team-leading categories of 64 RBIs and 18 HRs, while hitting .272. He missed 15 games.

==== Swept in Chicago ====
A crucial visit to Wrigley Field for the September 15–17 series against the Cubs, going into it, led the Cardinals by only three games. The three games there turned into a sweep by the home team pushing the Cardinals behind by six games to win the NL Central, with only 13 remaining. In this series, the Cardinals finished 2-for-14 with runners in scoring position and cost themselves runs at least four times with poor defensive plays. The losses also dropped the team to third place in the NL Central, two games behind the Brewers. They are also 4 1/2 games behind the Colorado Rockies for the second Wild Card spot. The Cardinals have only four more (home) games against the Cubs, with six road games against the Reds and Pirates prior, and ending the season at home after the Cubs, against the Brewers.

==== Wainwright to return, as a reliever ====
Adam Wainwright is poised to return from the DL in time for the September 19 game, but he will as a reliever. He was placed on the DL with a right elbow impingement on August 28. The Cardinals plan to continue starting rookie Jack Flaherty, who has made three appearances since being called up at the start of the month. Flaherty, whose next start will be on September 19, is in line to make three starts over the team's final 13 games. None of those would be against the Cubs. Wainwright was activated from the DL before the September 19 game, missing 28 games and five starts. 3B-man Jedd Gyorko returned to the field, making his first start there since August 26.

==== Molina starts a GoFundMe page for Puerto Rico ====
Yadier Molina and his wife Wanda, started a GoFundMe page for victims of Hurricane Maria on September 21, with a goal of $1 million. It has raised $20,000 in seven hours. More than 3 million people there are without power, and over 95% of cell service is down. Molina is a native of Bayamon and reportedly owns a home in Vega Alta. Drone video on The Weather Channel described Bayamon as looking "like a war zone".

==== Cardinals eliminated from NL Central title ====
The team was eliminated from the NL Central race with the loss to the Cubs in the first game of their final head-to-head four-game series on September 25. The club is 4–12 against the Cubs, with three games remaining between them. They are seven games behind the Cubs with six to play. Cardinals' pitching has served up 19 home runs in 16 games to the Cubs this season. The Cardinals (81–75) trail the Colorado Rockies by 2 1/2 games in the NL Wild Card chase. The Cardinals also trail the second-place Milwaukee Brewers by one game in the Wild Card hunt.

==== Molina on concussion protocol ====
Yadier Molina was placed on baseball's concussion protocol after consecutive foul tip pitches off his catcher's mask on September 25. Protocol requires that a player be evaluated 48 hours (2 days) after sustaining the head trauma before a diagnosis is determined. Molina noted that his headaches and nausea had subsided since Monday (September 25), though he has not been cleared to drive a car. It was the first time Molina said he could remember being hit by foul balls on consecutive pitches. He missed three games following the incident. He hopes to play again before the final regular season game on (Sunday) October 1. After the team was eliminated from post-season play with the loss on September 28, he and three other players were shut down on September 29, for the remaining three games in the season, to prevent further damage from their injuries. Adam Wainwright, Matt Carpenter, and LH-reliever Tyler Lyons were given rest for the last three games. Lyons did not miss any time this season due to injury, but had started to recently show signs of weakness in his surgically repaired left knee. The Cardinals don't want to risk any additional stress over this final weekend.

On August 28, Carpenter announced that he would make a $10,000 donation, to relief efforts from Hurricane Harvey in his hometown of Houston, for every home run he hit for the rest of the season. Wainwright and the Cardinals quickly matched that pledge. Though he played with a shoulder injury, Carpenter went on to hit six homers over the final 24 games to bring the donation total to $180,000. Carpenter said he has already given his $60,000 portion to the American Red Cross.

==== Lance Lynn's final start, Cardinals knocked out of playoffs ====
Lance Lynn made what is probably his last start as a Cardinals' pitcher, since his rookie year in 2011. He pitched five strong innings, giving up just one run (1st inn. HR), three hits, walking four, striking out five, on September 28. He led the pitching staff with 33 starts, (and 3.43 ERA for the starters), while giving up a team-high 27 home runs. He is expected to become a free agent after the season end, with the team not interested in conducting contract extension talks with him. He is tied with Adam Wainwright for the most post-season appearances with 24. He is third in franchise history with five post-season wins. His career numbers are 72–47 (.605), 3.38 ERA in 183 G with 161 starts, 369 walks, 919 strikeouts, 1.29 WHIP, and 114 ERA+. The club was knocked out of the playoffs as a possible Wild Card entry with the extra-inning loss to the Cubs, where Paul DeJong was robbed of a would-be game-tying home run by center fielder Leonys Martin in the 11th inning to end the game. The Cubs had a 14–5 record against their division rivals, and won seven of eight one-run games against them. With the loss on September 28, that game was the last since the start of the 2011 season that the Cards took the field for a regular-season game knowing they had post-season aspirations. That covered 1,131 consecutive games, which was the longest active streak in major league baseball.

=== October ===
==== Final game ====
The final game on October 1, was a loss to the second-place Milwaukee Brewers (86–76), scoring only one run. The Cardinals ended 2017 with an 83–79 (.512) record, in third place in the NL Central, nine games behind the division-winning Cubs (92–70), and four games behind the second Wild Card Colorado Rockies (87–75).

==== Attendance ====
The attendance for their 81 home games (44–37 .543), was 3,448,337 up 0.1% from the 3,444,490 in 2016. Their attendance is second in the 15-team NL only to the Los Angeles Dodgers that has over four times the St. Louis metro population and a stadium that has a capacity of 56,000, over 13,000 more than Busch Stadium. Away, the club was 39–42 (.481). The team had a 24–29 (.453) record in one-run games. They are 11–13 (.458) record in 2-run games. For 1- or 2-run games, the team is 35–42 (.455). Scored 761 runs, giving up 705, +56. In 2016, scored 779, allowed 712, +67.

== Schedule and results ==
Regular Season Schedule (sortable text)

Regular season schedule (calendar format)

Most games were broadcast on Fox Sports Midwest, unless noted on the game dates. Games broadcast on the MLB Network not noted.
Small notation (TBS / ESPN) game broadcasts are for out-of-metro area only.

=== Game log ===
2017 St. Louis Cardinals Game Log, 83–79 (.512)
April: 12–12 (.500) (Home: 8–6; Away: 4–6)

#	Date	Opponent	Score	Win	Loss	Save	Attendance	Record	Box / L10
1	April 2	Cubs (ESPN)	4–3	**Oh** (1–0)	Montgomery (0–1)		47,566	1–0	1–0
2	April 4	Cubs (MLB)	1–2	Arrieta (1–0)	**Wainwright** (0–1)	Davis (1)	46,760	1–1	1–1
–	April 5	Cubs (MLB)	Postponed (rain). Makeup date: April 6th.						
3	April 6	Cubs (MLB)	4–6	Lackey (1–0)	**Cecil** (0–1)	Davis (2)	44,039	1–2	1–2
4	April 7	Reds	0–2	Garrett (1–0)	**Leake** (0–1)	Iglesias (2)	44,653	1–3	1–3
5	April 8	Reds	10–4	**Wacha** (1–0)	Arroyo (0–1)		46,558	2–3	2–3
6	April 9	Reds	0–8	Feldman (1–1)	**Martinez** (0–1)		45,200	2–4	2–4
7	April 10	@Nationals	6–14	Roark (2–0)	**Wainwright** (0–2)		27,413	2–5	2–5
8	April 11	@Nationals (ESPN)	3–8	Gonzalez (1–0)	**Lynn** (0–1)		30,663	2–6	2–6
9	April 12	@Nationals	6–1	**Leake** (1–1)	Scherzer (1–1)		31,647	3–6	3–6
10	April 14	@Yankees (MLB)	3–4	Tanaka (1–1)	**Wacha** (1–1)	Chapman (3)	39,102	3–7	3–7
11	April 15	@Yankees (MLB)	2–3	Sabathia (2–0)	**Martinez** (0–2)	Clippard (1)	43,031	3–8	2–8
12	April 16	@Yankees (ESPN)	3–9	Pineda (2–1)	**Wainwright** (0–3)		31,706	3–9	2–8
13	April 17	Pirates	2–1	**Lynn** (1–1)	Nova (1–2)	**Oh** (1)	40,172	4–9	3–7
14	April 18	Pirates	2–1	**Leake** (2–1)	Kuhl (1–1)	**Oh** (2)	38,806	5–9	4–6
15	April 19	Pirates	2–1	**Wacha** (2–1)	Cole (1–2)	**Rosenthal** (1)	40,182	6–9	4–6
16	April 20	@Brewers	5–7	Davies (1–2)	**Martinez** (0–3)	Barnes (1)	26,451	6–10	4–6
17	April 21	@Brewers	6–3	**Wainwright** (1–3)	Peralta (3–1)	**Oh** (3)	23,126	7–10	5–5
18	April 22	@Brewers	4–1	**Lynn** (2–1)	Torres (0–2)	**Oh** (4)	30,865	8–10	6–4
19	April 23	@Brewers	6–4	**Leake** (3–1)	Nelson (1–1)	**Oh** (5)	31,158	9–10	6–4
20	April 25	Blue Jays	5–6 (11)	Grilli (1–2)	**Socolovich** (0–1)	Tepera (1)	40,223	9–11	6–4
–	April 26	Blue Jays	Postponed (rain). Makeup date: April 27th.						
21	April 27	Blue Jays	8–4 (11)	**Bowman** (1–0)	Tepera (1–1)		40,099	10–11	7–3
22	April 27	Blue Jays	6–4	**Wainwright** (2–3)	Lawrence (0–3)	**Rosenthal** (2)	40,035	11–11	8–2
23	April 28	Reds	7–5	**Lynn** (3–1)	Adleman (0–1)	**Oh** (6)	42,722	12–11	8–2
–	April 29	Reds	Postponed (rain). Makeup date: June 26.						
24	April 30	Reds	4–5	Peralta (1–0)	**Rosenthal** (0–1)	Iglesias (4)	45,682	12–12	7–3

May: 13–13 (.500) (Home: 5–9; Away: 8–4)

#	Date	Opponent	Score	Win	Loss	Save	Attendance	Record	Box / L10
25	May 1	Brewers	4–6 (10)	Drake (1–0)	**Oh** (1–1)	Feliz (7)	36,323	12–13	6–4
26	May 2	Brewers	2–1	Martinez (1–3)	**Peralta** (4–2)	**Rosenthal** (3)	38,616	13–13	7–3
–	May 3	Brewers	Postponed (rain). Makeup date: June 13 (1st G).						
27	May 4	Brewers	4–5	Drake (2–0)	**Bowman** (1–1)	Feliz (8)	36,250	13–14	6–4
28	May 5	@Braves	10–0	**Lynn** (4–1)	Foltynewicz (0–4)		34,465	14–14	6–4
29	May 6	@Braves	5–3	**Leake** (4–1)	Teheran (2–3)	**Oh** (7)	40,706	15–14	7–3
30	May 7	@Braves	6–4 (14)	**Tuivailala** (1–0)	Collmenter (0–1)	**Siegrist** (1)	40,200	16–14	7–3
31	May 8	@Marlins	9–4	**Martinez** (2–3)	Conley (2–3)	**Socolovich** (1)	16,750	17–14	7–3
32	May 9	@Marlins	6–5	**Rosenthal** (1–1)	Ramos (1–2)	**Oh** (8)	17,166	18–14	7–3
33	May 10	@Marlins	7–5	**Tuivailala** (2–0)	Garcia (0–1)	**Oh** (9)	18,614	19–14	7–3
34	May 12	Cubs	2–3	Butler (1–0)	**Leake** (4–2)	Davis (8)	47,601	19–15	7–3
35	May 13	Cubs (FS1)	5–3	**Martinez** (3–3)	Lester (1–2)	**Oh** (10)	47,882	20–15	8–2
36	May 14	Cubs	5–0	**Wainwright** (3–3)	Arrieta (4–3)		47,925	21–15	8–2
37	May 16	Red Sox	3–6	Rodriguez (2–1)	**Lynn** (4–2)	Kimbrel (12)	41,514	21–16	8–2
38	May 17	Red Sox	4–5 (13)	Abad (1–0)	**Tuivailala** (2–1)	Taylor (1)	44,365	21–17	7–3
39	May 19	Giants	5–6	Morris (2–0)	**Oh** (1–2)	Melancon (7)	44.548	21–18	6–4
40	May 20	Giants (FOX)	1–3 (13)	Strickland (1–1)	**Siegrist** (0–1)	Melancon (8)	45,072	21–19	5–5
41	May 21	Giants	8–3	**Wainwright** (4–3)	Cain (3–2)		47,533	22–19	5–5
42	May 23	@Dodgers	1–2 (13)	Fields (1–0)	**Broxton** (0–1)		41,248	22–20	4–6
43	May 24	@Dodgers	6–1	**Leake** (5–2)	Hill (1–2)		40,653	23–20	4–6
44	May 25	@Dodgers	3–7	Maeds (4–2)	**Wacha** (2–2)	Ryu (1)	47,427	23–21	4–6
45	May 26	@Rockies	0–10	Senzatela (7–1)	**Martinez** (3–4)		40,312	23–22	3–7
46	May 27	@Rockies	3–0	**Wainwright** (5–3)	Freeland (5–3)	**Oh** (11)	48,106	24–22	3–7
47	May 28	@Rockies	4–8	Marquez (4–2)	**Lynn** (4–3)		48,372	24–23	3–7
48	May 29	Dodgers	1–5	Hill (2–2)	**Leake** (5–3)		46,241	24–24	3–7
49	May 30	Dodgers	4–9	Morrow (1–0)	**Wacha** (2–3)		38,466	24–25	3–7
50	May 31	Dodgers	2–1	**Martinez** (4–4)	Stripling (0–3)	**Oh** (12)	40,304	25–25	4–6

June: 13–16 (.448) (Home: 8–5; Away: 5–11)

#	Date	Opponent	Score	Win	Loss	Save	Attendance	Record	Box / L10
51	June 1	Dodgers	2–0	**Wainwright** (6–3)	McCarthy (5–2)	**Oh** (13)	40,477	26–25	4–6
52	June 2	@Cubs	2–3	Strop (1–2)	**Rosenthal** (1–2)	Davis (11)	41,051	26–26	4–6
53	June 3	@Cubs	3–5	Rondon (1–1)	**Leake** (5–4)	Davis (12)	41,164	26–27	3–7
54	June 4	@Cubs (ESPN)	6–7	Strop (2–2)	**Bowman** (1–2)	Uehara (2)	39,868	26–28	3–7
55	June 5	@Reds	2–4	Bonilla (1–3)	**Martinez** (4–5)	Iglesias (10)	16,325	26–29	3–7
56	June 6	@Reds	1–13	Adleman (4–2)	**Wainwright** (6–4)		18,620	26–30	2–8
57	June 7	@Reds	4–6	Peralta (3–1)	**Cecil** (0–2)	Iglesias (11)	20,891	26–31	2–8
58	June 8	@Reds	2–5	Feldman (5–4)	**Leake** (5–5)	Iglesias (12)	28,917	26–32	2–8
59	June 9	Phillies	3–2	**Wacha** (3–3)	Hellickson (5–4)	**Oh** (14)	42,971	27–32	3–7
60	June 10	Phillies	7–0	**Martinez** (5–5)	Pivetta (1–3)		43,911	28–32	3–7
61	June 11	Phillies	6–5	**Wainwright** (7–4)	Nola (3–4)	**Oh** (15)	47,325	29–32	3–7
62	June 13	Brewers	6–0	**Lynn** (5–3)	Suter (0–1)	**Lyons** (1)	40,083	30–32	4–6
63	June 13	Brewers	5–8	Hughes (2–1)	**Rosenthal** (1–3)	Knebal (9)	40,115	30–33	4–6
64	June 14	Brewers	6–7	Garza (3–2)	**Leake** (5–6)	Knebal (10)	38,061	30–34	4–6
65	June 15	Brewers	4–6	Torres (3–4)	**Oh** (1–3)	Drake (1)	45,228	30–35	4–6
66	June 16	@Orioles	11–2	**Martinez** (6–5)	Gausman (3–6)		26,341	31–35	5–5
67	June 17	@Orioles	7–15	Miley (3–4)	**Wainwright** (7–5)		27,788	31–36	5–5
68	June 18	@Orioles	5–8	Jiménez (2–2)	**Lynn** (5–4)	Brach (12)	34,854	31–37	5–5
69	June 20	@Phillies	8–1 (11)	**Siegrist** (1–1)	Ramos (0–5)		22,070	32–37	5–5
70	June 21	@Phillies	7–6 (10)	**Cecil** (1–2)	Ramos (0–6)	**Oh** (16)	25,037	33–37	5–5
71	June 22	@Phillies	1–5	Nola (4–5)	**Martinez** (6–6)		23,623	33–38	4–6
72	June 23	Pirates	3–4	Rivero (3–1)	**Oh** (1–4)		47,112	33–39	3–7
73	June 24	Pirates (FOX)	3–7	Cole (6–6)	**Lynn** (5–5)		46,735	33–40	3–7
74	June 25	Pirates (ESPN)	8–4	**Rosenthal** (2–3)	Nicasio (1–4)		43,719	34–40	4–6
75	June 26	Reds	8–2	**Wacha** (4–3)	Finnegan (1–1)		46,535	35–40	5–5
76	June 27	@D'Backs	5–6 (10)	Rodney (2–2)	**Bowman** (1–3)		24,256	35–41	4–6
77	June 28	@D'Backs	4–3	**Wainwright** (8–5)	Godley (3–2)	**Rosenthal** (4)	23,188	36–41	5–5
78	June 29	@D'Backs	10–4	**Lynn** (6–5)	De La Rosa (0–1)		27,603	37–41	6–4
79	June 30	Nationals	8–1	**Leake** (6–6)	Roark (6–6)		41,398	38–41	6–4

July: 14–12 (.538) (Home: 10–6; Away: 4–6)

#	Date	Opponent	Score	Win	Loss	Save	Attendance	Record	Box / L10
80	July 1	Nationals (FOX)	2–1	**Wacha** (5–3)	González (7–3)	**Bowman** (1)	43,614	39–41	6–4
81	July 2	Nationals (ESPN)	2–7	Scherzer (10–5)	**Martinez** (6–7)		43,640	39–42	6–4
82	July 3	Marlins	14–6	**Wainwright** (9–5)	Locke (0–5)		42,694	40–42	7–3
83	July 4	Marlins	2–5	Ureña (7–3)	**Lynn** (6–6)	Ramos (14)	38,497	40–43	7–3
84	July 5	Marlins	6–9	McGowan (5–0)	**Leake** (6–7)	Ramos (15)	40,204	40–44	6–4
85	July 6	Marlins	4–3	**Wacha** (6–3)	Koehler (1–4)	**Oh** (17)	37,780	41–44	6–4
86	July 7	Mets	5–6	deGrom (9–3)	**Martinez** (6–8)	Reed (15)	43,849	41–45	6–4
87	July 8	Mets	4–1	**Wainwright** (10–5)	Wheeler (3–6)	**Oh** (18)	44,013	42–45	6–4
88	July 9	Mets	6–0	**Lynn** (7–6)	Matz (2–2)		42,925	43–45	6–4
ASG	**88th All-Star Game** at Marlins Park in Miami, Florida, United States								Box
ASG	July 11	**NL All-Stars** 1, AL All-Stars 2 (10)		Kimbrel (BOS)	Davis (CHN)	Miller (CLE)	37,188	TIED 43–43–2	Box
ASG	Representing the Cardinals, as reserves: Carlos Martinez and Yadier Molina								Box
89	July 14	@Pirates	2–5	Rivero (4–2)	**Oh** (1–5)		24,988	43–46	5–5
90	July 15	@Pirates	4–0	**Lynn** (8–6)	Taillon (5–3)		35,658	44–46	5–5
91	July 16	@Pirates	3–4	LeBlanc (4–2)	**Cecil** (1–3)		29,247	44–47	5–5
92	July 17	@Mets	6–3	**Wainwright** (11–5)	Wheeler (3–7)	**Cecil** (1)	29,977	45–47	5–5
93	July 18	@Mets	5–0	**Wacha** (7–3)	Montero (1–6)		29,964	46–47	6–4
94	July 19	@Mets	3–7	deGrom (11–3)	**Leake** (6–8)	Reed (16)	32,228	46–48	6–4
95	July 20	@Mets	2–3	Reed (1–2)	**Rosenthal** (2–4)		39,640	46–49	5–5
96	July 21	@Cubs	11–4	**Bowman** (2–3)	Edwards (3–2)		42,186	47–49	6–4
97	July 22	@Cubs (FS1)	2–3	Lester (7–6)	**Bowman** (2–4)	Davis (19)	41,969	47–50	5–5
98	July 23	@Cubs (ESPN)	3–5	Quintana (6–8)	**Wacha** (7–4)	Davis (20)	41,582	47–51	4–6
99	July 24	Rockies	8–2	**Leake** (7–8)	Senzatela (10–4)		40,486	48–51	5–5
100	July 25	Rockies	3–2	**Rosenthal** (3–4)	McGee (0–1)		41,514	49–51	5–5
101	July 26	Rockies	10–5	**Martinez** (7–8)	Hoffman (6–3)		38,162	50–51	6–4
102	July 27	D'Backs	0–4	Godley (4–4)	**Weaver** (0–1)		39,208	50–52	5–5
103	July 28	D'Backs	1–0	**Wacha** (8–4)	McFarland (4–3)	**Rosenthal** (5)	41,230	51–52	5–5
104	July 29	D'Backs	1–7	Greinke (13–4)	**Leake** (7–9)		**48,052**	51–53	5–5
105	July 30	D'Backs	3–2	**Lynn** (9–6)	Walker (6–5)	**Rosenthal** (6)	40,827	52–53	6–4

August: 15–13 (.536) (Home: 6–5; Away: 9–8)

#	Date	Opponent	Score	Win	Loss	Save	Attendance	Record	Box / L10
106	August 1	@Brewers	2–3	Nelson (9–5)	**Martinez** (7–9)	Knebel (19)	30,150	52–54	5–5
107	August 2	@Brewers	5–4	**Weaver** (1–1)	Suter (2–2)	**Rosenthal** (7)	34,433	53–54	6–4
108	August 3	@Brewers	1–2	Garza (5–5)	**Cecil** (1–4)	Knebel (20)	40,170	53–55	6–4
109	August 4	@Reds	2–3	Wojciechowski (2–1)	**Leake** (7–10)	Iglesias (19)	36,443	53–56	5–5
110	August 5	@Reds	4–1	**Lynn** (10–6)	Castillo (2–5)	**Rosenthal** (8)	35,571	54–56	5–5
111	August 6	@Reds	13–4	**Cecil** (2–4)	Bailey (3–6)		25,168	55–56	5–5
112	August 7	@Royals	11–3	**Martinez** (8–9)	Kennedy (4–8)		38,478	56–56	6–4
113	August 8	@Royals (FS1)	10–3	**Wacha** (9–4)	Vargas (13–6)		37,267	57–56	6–4
114	August 9	Royals	8–5	**Bowman** (3–4)	Maurer (1–5)	**Rosenthal** (9)	44,139	58–56	7–3
115	August 10	Royals	8–6	**Lyons** (1–0)	Minor (5–4)	**Rosenthal** (10)	41,706	59–56	7–3
116	August 11	Braves	8–5	**Wainwright** (12–5)	Foltynewicz (10–7)	**Bowman** (2)	41,928	60–56	8–2
117	August 12	Braves	6–5	**Martinez** (9–9)	Sims (0–3)	**Rosenthal** (11)	46,360	61–56	8–2
118	August 13	Braves	3–6	Dickey (8–7)	**Wacha** (9–5)	Vizcaíno (6)	44,534	61–57	8–2
119	August 15	@Red Sox	4–10	Porcello (7–14)	**Leake** (7–11)		37,345	61–58	8–2
120	August 16	@Red Sox	4–5	Kimbrel (5–0)	**Duke** (0–1)		37,181	61–59	7–3
121	August 17	@Pirates	11–7	**Tuivailala** (3–1)	Benoit (1–6)		31,499	62–59	7–3
122	August 18	@Pirates	11–10	**Martinez** (10–9)	Williams (5–6)	**Oh** (19)	29,906	63–59	7–3
123	August 19	@Pirates	4–6	Kuhl (6–8)	**Wacha** (9–6)	Rivero (13)	34,660	63–60	6–4
124	August 20 * @BB&T	@Pirates (ESPN)	3–6	Nova (11–10)	**Leake** (7–12)	Rivero (14)	2,596	63–61	5–5
125	August 22	Padres	4–12	Stammen (1–2)	**Bowman** (3–5)		38,767	63–62	4–6
126	August 23	Padres	6–2	**Weaver** (2–1)	Chacin (11–9)		38,762	64–62	4–6
127	August 24	Padres	3–4	Yates (3–4)	**Tuivailala** (3–2)	Hand (12)	38,726	64–63	3–7
128	August 25	Rays	3–7	Romo (2–1)	**Wacha** (9–7)		40,050	64–64	3–7
129	August 26	Rays	6–4	**Lyons** (2–0)	Boxberger (3–4)		41,295	65–64	4–6
130	August 27	Rays	2–3 (10)	Romo (3–1)	**Tuivailala** (3–3)	Colomé (39)	44,469	65–65	4–6
131	August 29	@Brewers	10–2	**Weaver** (3–1)	Garza (6–8)		31,985	66–65	4–6
132	August 30	@Brewers	5–6	Anderson (8–3)	**Martinez** (10–10)	Knebel (30)	28,964	66–66	3–7
133	August 31	@Giants	5–2	**Wacha** (10–7)	Cain (3–11)	**Oh** (20)	40,783	67–66	4–6

September: 16–12 (.571) (Home: 7–5; Away: 9–7)

#	Date	Opponent	Score	Win	Loss	Save	Attendance	Record	Box / L10
134	September 1	@Giants	11–6	**Lyons** (3–0)	Dyson (2–8)		37,797	68–66	5–5
135	September 2	@Giants (FS1)	1–2 (10)	Dyson (3–8)	**Sherriff** (0–1)		39,513	68–67	5–5
136	September 3	@Giants	7–3	**Weaver** (4–1)	Bumgarner (3–7)		39,784	69–67	5–5
137	September 4	@Padres	2–0	**Martinez** (11–10)	Perdomo (7–9)		25,028	70–67	6–4
138	September 5	@Padres	8–4	**Wacha** (11–7)	Wood (3–5)		17,806	71–67	7–3
139	September 6	@Padres	3–1	**Sherriff** (1–1)	Lamet (7–7)	**Lyons** (2)	21,411	72–67	7–3
140	September 7	@Padres	0–3	Richard (7–13)	**Lynn** (10–7)	Hand (16)	21,334	72–68	7–3
141	September 8	Pirates	4–1	**Weaver** (5–1)	Williams (6–8)	**Nicasio** (3)	40,966	73–68	7–3
142	September 9	Pirates	4–3	**Lyons** (4–0)	Kontos (0–6)	**Nicasio** (4)	44,378	74–68	8–2
143	September 10	Pirates	7–0	**Wacha** (12–7)	Nova (11–13)		44,683	75–68	8–2
144	September 12	Reds	13–4	**Lynn** (11–7)	Stephenson (4–5)		40,030	76–68	8–2
145	September 13	Reds	0–6	Mahle (1–2)	**Flaherty** (0–1)		40,124	76–69	8–2
146	September 14	Reds	5–2	**Weaver** (6–1)	Garrett (3–8)		40,230	77–69	8–2
147	September 15	@Cubs	2–8	Edwards (4–4)	**Martinez** (11–11)		38,464	77–70	7–3
148	September 16	@Cubs	1–4	Hendricks (7–5)	**Wacha** (12–8)	Davis (30)	40,959	77–71	6–4
149	September 17	@Cubs (FSM / TBS)	3–4	Strop (5–4)	**Lyons** (4–1)	Davis (31)	37,242	77–72	5–5
150	September 19	@Reds	8–7 (10)	**Nicasio** (4–5)	Adleman (5–11)	**Lyons** (3)	17,165	78–72	6–4
151	September 20	@Reds	9–2	**Weaver** (7–1)	Davis (1–3)		12,903	79–72	6–4
152	September 21	@Reds	8–5	**Martinez** (12–11)	Bailey (5–9)		14,803	80–72	6–4
153	September 22	@Pirates	4–3	**Nicasio** (5–5)	Rivero (5–3)		23,942	81–72	6–4
154	September 23	@Pirates	6–11	Cole (12–11)	**Lynn** (11–8)		29,672	81–73	5–5
155	September 24	@Pirates	1–4	Taillon (8–7)	**Oh** (1–6)	Rivero (19)	28,550	81–74	5–5
156	September 25	Cubs	2–10	Lester (12–8)	**Weaver** (7–2)		42,516	81–75	4–6
157	September 26	Cubs (FSM / ESPN)	8–7	**Duke** (1–1)	Arrieta (14–10)	**Nicasio** (5)	41,944	82–75	5–5
158	September 27	Cubs (FSM / ESPN)	1–5	Lackey (12–11)	**Wacha** (12–9)		42,070	82–76	5–5
159	September 28	Cubs	1–2 (11)	Tseng (1–0)	**Bowman** (3–6)		43,094	82–77	5–5
160	September 29	Brewers	3–5	Anderson (12–4)	**Gant** (0–1)		44,815	82–78	4–6
161	September 30	Brewers (FS1)	7–6	**Sherriff** (2–1)	Swarzak (6–4)	**Nicasio** (6)	42,246	83–78	4–6

October: 0–1 (.000) (Home: 0–1; Away: 0–0)

#	Date	Opponent	Score	Win	Loss	Save	Attendance	Record	Box / L10
162	October 1	Brewers	1–6	Wilkerson (1–0)	**Flaherty** (0–2)		44,787	83–79	3–7

Legend: = Win = Loss = Postponement
Bold = Cardinals player

• August 20 game vs Pittsburgh Pirates to be played at BB&T Ballpark at Historic Bowman Field in Williamsport, Pennsylvania, as part of MLB Little League Classic.

== Roster ==
2017 St. Louis Cardinals
Roster
Pitchers: 56 Sandy Alcantara; 67 Matt Bowman; 60 John Brebbia; 21,27 Brett Cecil; 29 Zach Duke; 32 Jack Flaherty; 53 John Gant; 56 Marco Gonzales; 8 Mike Leake; 77 Josh Lucas; 31 Lance Lynn; 70 Tyler Lyons; 18 Carlos Martínez; 59 Mike Mayers; 12 Juan Nicasio; 26 Seung-hwan Oh; 44 Trevor Rosenthal; 65 Ryan Sherriff; 46 Kevin Siegrist; 63 Miguel Socolovich; 64 Sam Tuivailala; 52 Michael Wacha; 50 Adam Wainwright; 62 Luke Weaver	Catchers: 41 Eric Fryer; 30 Carson Kelly; 4 Yadier Molina; 68 Alberto Rosario; Infielders: 32 Matt Adams; 13 Matt Carpenter; 11 Paul DeJong; 36 Aledmys Díaz; 35 Greg Garcia; 3 Jedd Gyorko; 54 Alex Mejia; 27 Jhonny Peralta; 68 Alberto Rosario; 41 Breyvic Valera; 40 Luke Voit; 16 Kolten Wong	Outfielders: 48 Harrison Bader; 25 Dexter Fowler; 15 Randal Grichuk; 65 Chad Huffman; 58 José Martinez; 28 Tommy Pham; 55 Stephen Piscotty; 43 Magneuris Sierra	Manager: 22 Mike Matheny; Coaches: 33 David Bell (bench); 49 Blaise Ilsley (bullpen); 34 Derek Lilliquist (pitching); 47 John Mabry (hitting); 37 Oliver Marmol (first base); 23 Bill Mueller (assistant hitting); -- Gaylen Pitts (special assistant); 39 Jamie Pogue (bullpen catcher); 38 Mike Shildt (third base); 76 Kleininger Teran (bullpen catcher); 75 Ron 'Pop' Warner (quality control coach / assistant coach)

=== Injury report ===
Injury Report

Name	Duration of Injury on DL		Injury type	Disabled list	Games missed	Ref.
Name	Start	End	Injury type	Disabled list	Games missed	Ref.
John Gant (RHP)	March 30	May 16	Right groin strain	March 30 (10-day)	36	
Zach Duke (LHP)	March 29, 2017; October 14, 2016	July 21	Tommy John surgery, forearm flexor (October 3–7)	March 29 (60-day)	95	
Alex Reyes (RHP)	March 30	TBD	Tommy John surgery, partial elbow UCL tear (February 14)	March 30 (10-day); Trans. to 60-day DL, June 28	162	
Jordan Schafer (OF/LHP)	TBD	TBD	UCL tear repaired (March 17)		XX	
Trevor Rosenthal (RHP)	March 30	April 10	Right lat strain	March 30 (10-day)	6	
Tyler Lyons (LHP)	March 30	April 20	Right knee	March 30 (10-day)	15	
Jhonny Peralta (3B)	April 20	May 18	Upper respiratory	Apr 20 (retroactive, Apr 17)	26	
Tyler Lyons (LHP)	May 2	May 23	Right intercostal muscle strain	May 2 (10-day)	16	
Stephen Piscotty (RF)	May 5	May 20	Right hamstring strain	May 5 (10-day)	12	
Jose Martinez (OF)	May 7	May 29	Left groin strain	May 7 (10-day)	18	
Kolten Wong (2B)	May 28	June 9	Left elbow strain	May 28 (retroactive, May 27)	13	
Kolten Wong (2B)	June 15	July 13	Right triceps strain	June 15 (10-day)	24	
Dexter Fowler (CF)	June 25	July 7	Right heel spur	June 25 (10-day)	12	
Kevin Siegrist (LHP)	June 25	July 13	Cervical spine strain	June 25 (retroactive, Jun 23)	17	
Randal Grichuk (LF)	July 14	July 21	Lower back strain	July 14 (retroactive, Jul 10)	7	
Stephen Piscotty (RF)	July 15	August 1	Right groin strain	July 15 (10-day)	16	
Dexter Fowler (CF)	July 25	August 7	Right wrist sprain	July 25 (10-day)	12	
Adam Wainwright (RHP)	July 25	August 6	Mid-back tightness	July 25 (retroactive, Jul 23)	11 (2 starts)	
Kevin Siegrist (LHP)	August 6	August 31 (DFA)	Left forearm Tendinitis	August 6 (10-day)	22	
Trevor Rosenthal (RHP)	August 17	TBD	Right posterior elbow irritation Tommy John surgery, elbow UCL tear (DATE)	August 17 (10-day); Trans. to 60-day DL, Aug 23	42	
Adam Wainwright (RHP)	August 18	September 19	Right elbow impingement	August 18 (10-day)	28 (5 starts)	
Jedd Gyorko (3B)	August 27	September 13	Right hamstring sprain	August 27 (10-day)	15	

== Statistics ==
=== Batting statistics ===
(through October 1)

Legend
Pos	Position	R	Runs scored	HR	Home runs	SB	Stolen bases	AVG	Batting average
G	Games played	H	Hits	RBI	Runs batted in	CS	Caught stealing	OBP	On-base percentage
PA	Plate appearances	2B	Doubles	BB	Bases on balls	HBP	HBP	SLG	Slugging percentage
AB	At bats	3B	Triples	SO	Strikeouts	GIDP	GIDP	OPS	On-base plus slugging percentage

	Key to symbols and categories
**Names**	* – left-handed batter or pitcher; # – switch hitter; Bold: active and on both 25-man roster and 40-man roster; ''₤ – on 40-man roster but not 25-man roster; Italics: on 10-day disabled list (DL) or 60-day DL (§)
**Starting lineup** / **rotation**	Table half above first double line: Appeared in most games at that position or top five pitchers in starts Below double line: Ranked by AB regardless of position for position players / Role, then IP for pitchers
**Statistics**	: Team leader; Bold: Major League Baseball (MLB) leader or tied for lead; **Bold** (non-italicized): American (AL) or National League (NL) leader or tied for lead; ^{†} – top-ten in AL or NL

Players in italics no longer on the roster
BOLD = team leader in category

Regular season
Pos (most-least)	Batter (last game)	G	AB	R	H	2B	3B	HR	RBI	BB	SO	SB	CS	HBP	GIDP	AVG	OBP	SLG	OPS
LF/1B	M. Adams ( -5/19)	31	48	4	14	2	0	1	7	4	17	0	0	0	0	0.292	0.340	0.396	0.735
CF/LF/RF	H. Bader ( -10/1)	32	85	10	20	3	0	3	10	5	24	2	1	1	1	0.235	0.283	0.376	0.659
1B/3B/2B	M. Carpenter ( -9/28)	**145**	497	91	120	**31**	2	23	69	**109**	125	2	1	9	5	0.241	0.384	0.451	0.835
SS/2B	P. DeJong ( -10/1)	108	417	55	119	26	1	**25**	65	21	124	1	0	4	8	0.285	0.325	0.532	0.857
SS/3B/LF	A. Diaz ( -10/1)	79	286	31	74	17	0	7	20	13	42	4	1	0	9	0.259	0.290	0.392	0.682
CF	D. Fowler ( -9/28)	118	420	68	111	22	**9**	18	64	63	101	7	3	4	10	0.264	0.363	0.488	0.851
C	E. Fryer ( -7/20)	34	71	7	11	3	0	0	3	11	18	0	0	1	3	0.155	0.277	0.197	0.474
3B/2B/SS	G. Garcia ( -10/1)	133	241	27	61	9	2	2	20	37	64	2	1	6	6	0.253	0.365	0.332	0.697
LF/RF/CF	R. Grichuk ( -10/1)	122	412	53	98	25	3	22	59	26	**133**	6	1	2	9	0.238	0.285	0.473	0.758
3B/1B/2B	J. Gyorko ( -9/28)	125	426	52	116	21	2	20	67	47	105	6	2	1	12	0.272	0.341	0.472	0.813
PH/RF	C. Huffman ( -6/24)	12	14	3	4	0	1	0	0	1	6	0	0	0	0	0.286	0.333	0.429	0.762
C	C. Kelly ( -10/1)	34	69	5	12	3	0	0	6	5	11	0	0	1	3	0.174	0.240	0.217	0.457
1B/LF/RF	J. Martinez ( -10/1)	106	272	47	84	13	1	14	46	32	60	4	0	0	9	0.309	0.379	0.518	0.897
3B/SS/2B	A. Mejia ( -10/1)	29	46	6	5	0	0	1	3	2	13	0	0	0	2	0.109	0.146	0.174	0.320
C	Y. Molina ( -9/25)	136	**501**	60	**137**	27	1	18	**82**	28	74	9	4	4	14	0.273	0.312	0.439	0.751
3B	J. Peralta ( -6/6)	21	54	3	11	0	0	0	0	4	13	0	0	0	2	0.204	0.259	0.204	0.462
LF/CF	T. Pham ( -9/30)	128	444	**95**	136	22	2	23	73	71	117	**25**	**7**	10	**18**	**0.306**	**0.411**	**0.520**	**0.931**
RF	S. Piscotty ( -9/30)	107	341	40	80	16	1	9	39	52	87	3	6	5	11	0.235	0.342	0.367	0.708
C	A. Rosario ( -10/1)	3	3	0	0	0	0	0	0	0	1	0	0	0	1	0.000	0.000	0.000	0.000
RF/CF/LF	M. Sierra ( -10/1)	22	60	10	19	0	0	0	5	4	14	2	2	0	0	0.317	0.359	0.317	0.676
2B	B. Valera ( -10/1)	5	10	0	1	0	0	0	0	1	0	0	0	0	0	0.100	0.182	0.100	0.282
1B	L. Voit ( -10/1)	62	114	18	28	9	0	4	18	7	31	0	0	3	4	0.246	0.306	0.430	0.736
2B	K. Wong ( -9/25)	108	354	55	101	27	3	4	42	41	60	8	2	**12**	4	0.285	0.376	0.412	0.788
**Non-pitcher totals**			**5,185**	**740**	**1,362**	**276**	**28**	**194**	**698**	**584**	**1,240**	**81**	**31**	**63**	**131**	**0.263**	**0.342**	**0.439**	**0.781**
Pitcher totals			285	21	40	8	0	2	30	9	108	0	0	2	8	0.140	0.172	0.189	0.361
TEAM TOTALS (10/1)		162	5,470	761	1,402	284	28	196	728	593	1,348	81	31	65	139	0.256	0.334	0.426	0.760
Rank of 15 teams in NL			11th	7th	6th	9th	10th	8th	7th	3rd	8th	7th	7th	6th	2nd	5th	4th	10th	8th

Pos Name G, AB, R, H, 2B, 3B, HR, RBI, BB, SO, SB, CS, HBP, GIDP, AVG, OBP, SLG, OPS -->

NL Team Batting

=== Pitching statistics ===
(through October 1)

Legend
Role	Pitcher	G	Games pitched	ShO	Shutouts	HR	Home runs allowed	H/9	Hits per nine innings pitched
W	Wins	GS	Games started	SV	Save	BB	Bases on balls allowed	BB/9	Bases on balls per 9 innings pitched
L	Losses	GF	Games finished	IP	Innings pitched	SO	Strikeouts	SO/9	Strikeouts per 9 innings pitched
ERA	Earned run average	CG	Complete game	H	Hits allowed	WHIP	Walks plus hits per inning pitched	BFP	Batters faced by pitcher

	Key to symbols and categories
**Names**	* – left-handed batter or pitcher; # – switch hitter; Bold: active and on both 25-man roster and 40-man roster; ''₤ – on 40-man roster but not 25-man roster; Italics: on 10-day disabled list (DL) or 60-day DL (§)
**Starting lineup** / **rotation**	Table half above first double line: Appeared in most games at that position or top five pitchers in starts Below double line: Ranked by AB regardless of position for position players / Role, then IP for pitchers
**Statistics**	: Team leader; Bold: Major League Baseball (MLB) leader or tied for lead; **Bold** (non-italicized): American (AL) or National League (NL) leader or tied for lead; ^{†} – top-ten in AL or NL

Players in italics no longer on the roster
BOLD = team leader in categoryRole Name W L W-L& ERA G GS GF CG ShO SV IP H HR BB SO WHIP Opp. BA H/9 BB/9 SO/9 BB/9 SO/BB bgcolor="gold"| for leader in category -->

Regular season
Pitcher (last game)	W	L	W%	ERA	G	GS	GF	CG	ShO	SV	IP	H	HR	BB	SO	WHIP	Opp.BA	H/9	BB/9	SO/9	BFP
S. Alcantara ( -10/1)	0	0	.000	4.32	8	0	3	0	0	0	8.1	9	2	6	10	1.800	0.273	9.7	6.5	10.8	39
M. Bowman ( -9/28)	3	6	.333	3.99	**75**	0	10	0	0	2	58.2	52	4	18	46	1.193	0.239	8.0	2.8	7.1	247
J. Brebbia ( -10/1)	0	0	.000	2.44	50	0	13	0	0	0	51.2	37	8	11	51	0.929	0.193	6.4	1.9	8.9	209
J. Broxton ( -5/30)	0	1	.000	6.89	20	0	8	0	0	0	15.2	23	2	11	16	2.170	0.371	13.2	6.3	9.2	78
B. Cecil ( -10/1)	2	4	.333	3.88	73	0	12	0	0	1	67.1	67	7	16	66	1.233	0.262	9.0	2.1	8.8	277
Z. Duke ( -9/30)	1	1	.500	3.93	27	0	1	0	0	0	18.1	13	3	6	12	1.036	0.197	6.4	2.9	5.9	74
J. Flaherty ( -10/1)	0	2	.000	6.33	6	5	0	0	0	0	21.1	23	4	10	20	1.547	0.284	9.7	4.2	8.4	94
J. Gant ( -9/29)	0	1	.000	4.67	7	2	1	0	0	0	17.1	17	4	10	11	1.558	0.266	8.8	5.2	5.7	76
M. Gonzales ( -6/13)	0	0	.000	13.50	1	1	0	0	0	0	3.1	6	3	0	2	1.800	0.375	16.2	0.0	5.4	16
M. Leake ( -8/26)	7	**12**	.368	4.21	26	26	0	0	0	0	154.0	169	19	35	103	1.325	0.282	9.9	2.0	6.0	654
J. Lucas ( -9/29)	0	0	.000	3.68	5	0	2	0	0	0	7.1	7	2	4	7	1.500	0.259	8.6	4.9	8.6	32
L. Lynn ( -9/28)	11	8	.579	**3.43**	33	**33**	0	0	0	0	186.1	151	**27**	**78**	153	1.229	**0.223**	**7.3**	3.8	7.4	776
T. Lyons ( -9/26)	4	1	.800	2.83	50	0	12	0	0	3	54.0	39	3	20	68	1.093	0.206	6.5	3.3	11.3	220
C. Martinez ( -9/26)	**12**	11	.522	3.64	32	32	0	**2**	**2**	0	**205.0**	**179**	**27**	71	**217**	**1.220**	0.232	7.9	**3.1**	**9.5**	**858**
M. Mayers ( -8/18)	0	0	.000	11.57	3	0	1	0	0	0	4.2	8	2	4	3	2.571	0.421	15.4	7.7	5.8	25
J. Nicasio (9/8-9/30)	2	0	1.000	1.64	9	0	7	0	0	4	11.0	9	1	2	11	1.000	0.214	7.4	1.6	9.0	44
S. Oh ( -9/24)	1	6	.143	4.10	62	0	**38**	0	0	**20**	59.1	68	10	15	54	1.399	0.285	10.3	2.3	8.2	264
T. Rosenthal ( -8/16)	3	4	.429	3.40	50	0	16	0	0	11	47.2	37	3	20	76	1.196	0.210	7.0	3.8	14.3	202
R. Sherriff ( -9/30)	2	1	.667	3.14	13	0	2	0	0	0	14.1	13	2	4	15	1.186	0.236	8.2	2.5	9.4	60
K. Siegrist ( -8/3)	1	1	.500	4.98	39	0	7	0	0	1	34.1	35	4	20	36	1.602	0.271	9.2	5.2	9.4	151
M. Socolovich ( -5/26)	0	1	.000	8.68	15	0	7	0	0	1	18.2	27	4	4	14	1.661	0.338	13.0	1.9	6.8	87
S. Tuivailala ( -10/1)	3	3	.500	2.55	37	0	19	0	0	0	42.1	35	4	11	34	1.087	0.223	7.4	2.3	7.2	171
M. Wacha ( -9/27)	**12**	9	**.571**	4.13	30	30	0	1	1	0	165.2	170	17	55	158	1.358	0.267	9.2	3.0	8.6	701
A. Wainwright ( -9/23)	**12**	5	.706	5.11	24	23	0	0	0	0	123.1	140	14	45	96	1.500	0.286	10.2	3.3	7.0	546
L. Weaver ( -9/30)	7	2	.778	3.88	13	10	0	0	0	0	60.1	59	7	17	72	1.260	0.254	8.8	2.5	10.7	252
STARTER Totals	61	50	.550	4.13	162	162	0	3	3	0	919.1	900	119	312	821	1.318	0.257	8.81	3.05	8.04	3,903
RELIEVER Totals	22	29	.431	3.81	546	-	159	-	-	43	531.0	493	64	181	530	1.267	0.246	8.36	3.07	8.98	2,250
TEAM TOTALS	83	79	.512	4.01	162	162	159	3	3	43	1,450.1	1,393	183	493	1,351	1.300	0.253	8.64	3.06	8.38	6,153
Rank of 15 teams in NL				6th	-	-	13th	1st	2nd	6th	2nd	10th	12th	14th	6th	5th	6th	-	-	-	11th

NL Team Pitching

== Records, awards, and milestones ==
=== Records ===
Records
Performer	Organization or venue	Accomplishment	Date	Ref.
Randal Grichuk	Busch Stadium	Longest HR by a Cardinals' player in Busch Stadium III history-478 feet (146 m), Keon Broxton (Mil. Brewers) hit a 489-ft. HR, 6/15	June 25	
Paul DeJong	Busch Stadium	First Cardinals shortstop, First Cardinals' #8 hitter to record 4 Extra-base hits in a game (3 Doubles, 1 HR)	July 8	
Paul DeJong	Busch Stadium	8 Extra-base hits, most by a Cardinals' player in a 3-game series in modern era (post-1900)	July 9	
Magneuris Sierra	PNC Park	First Cardinal to hit safely in his first 9 games (16-for-36, .444)	July 16	
Paul DeJong	Busch Stadium	One of only two Cardinals to ever hit double-digit HRs for both the Cardinals, and AAA Memphis in the same season, 13–13. (Rick Ankiel, 2007, 32-AAA,11-StL)	July 25	
n/a	Busch Stadium	Largest attendance at Busch Stadium: 48,052 (previous May 14, 2017; 47,925)	July 29	
Paul DeJong	PNC Park	Only 4th Cardinals' rookie to hit 20 HRs.	August 19	

=== Awards ===
Major League Baseball All-Star Game selections

Cardinals representing the National League
Player	Pos.	Sel. (rank)	Notes	Ref.
Carlos Martinez	P	12 (5th)	Selected as reserve by player ballot	
Yadier Molina	C	1 (1st)	Selected as reserve by player ballot	

Other awards

Regular season awards
Performer	Date	Awards	Ref.
Jedd Gyorko	July 18	Heart and Hustle Award (Cardinals' nominee) (MLBPAA)	
Paul DeJong	August 2	NL Rookie of the Month Award (July) (.298/.347/.638 .985 OPS, 121 OPS+, 6 HR, 16 RBIs)	
Adam Wainwright	September 5 (voting Oct. 2–6)	Roberto Clemente Award (Cardinals' nominee) (Major League Baseball); Previous Cardinals' winners: Lou Brock (1975), Ozzie Smith (1995), Albert Pujols (2008)	
Jose Martinez	October 2	NL Rookie of the Month Award (September/October) (.353/.433/.553 .986 OPS, 121 OPS+, 30 H, 12 W, 4 HR, 18 RBIs; 25G)	
Adam Wainwright	November 9	NL Silver Slugger Award (1st among P: .262 BA, .452 SLG, .731 OPS, 11 RBIs, 7 Runs) (Joins Cardinals' P Bob Forsch (1980, 1987), Jason Marquis (2005)	

=== Milestones ===
Regular season milestones
Performer	Accomplishment	Date	Ref.
Adam Wainwright	10th (tie) Games Pitched, Cardinals (330)	May 27	
Paul DeJong	Major League debut, Home Run in first AB (9th Cardinals' player)	May 28	
Jose Martinez	First multi-HR game	June 13	
Tommy Pham	2 Home Runs, 2 Assists (1st Cardinals' player)	June 21	
Luke Voit	Major League debut, Hit-by-pitch	June 25	
Alex Mejia	Major League debut, groundout	June 29	
Alex Mejia	First Hit, HR, RBIs	July 1	
Matt Bowman	First Save	July 1	
Yadier Molina	16-game hit streak; ties his longest	July 1	
Michael Wacha	Second-fastest Cardinals' pitcher (tied with Steve Carlton to 500 strikeouts, 106 G; Lance Lynn 101 G)	July 1	
Mike Matheny	Mgr. win 500, 2nd-fastest in Cardinals' history (890 G); Billy Southworth (766 G)	July 1	
Luke Voit	First HR, RBIs (4)	July 3	
Adam Wainwright	144th Cardinals' win (tied Bill Doak for 5th place)	July 8	
Yadier Molina	321st Double (tied Yogi Berra for 18th place, Catchers)	July 8	
Adam Wainwright	145th Cardinals' win (5th place on Cardinals' win list)	July 17	
Adam Wainwright	Double-digit RBIs for 2nd consecutive year (only active MLB pitcher with multiple 10-plus RBI seasons)	July 17	
Michael Wacha	First complete game, shutout (most pitches, 119)	July 18	
Matt Carpenter	21 consecutive games reaching base (longest active in NL, 2017); 3 first-pitch hits in a game 1st time (career)	July 18	
Harrison Bader	Major League debut (groundout), First Hit, Run	July 25	
Jose Martinez	First grand slam	August 6	
St. Louis Cardinals	First time a grand slam was go-ahead runs in consecutive games	August 9–10	
St. Louis Cardinals	6 Consecutive Games of 8+ Runs Scored	August 6–11	
Adam Wainwright	11th RBI leads all MLB pitchers	August 11	
Josh Lucas	Major League debut (First strikeout)	August 19	
Ryan Sherriff	Major League debut (First strikeout)	August 25	
Jack Flaherty	Major League debut (First strikeout)	September 1	
Harrison Bader	First HR, RBIs (2)	September 1	
Sandy Alcantara	Major League debut (First strikeout)	September 3	
Breyvic Valera	Major League debut	September 5	
Yadier Molina	5-RBI Game, ties high	September 10	
Tommy Pham	20 HR-20 SB (6th Cardinal; Reggie Sanders last, 2004)	September 14	
Yadier Molina	1,727 Hits (ties Jim Bottomley 1922–1932, for 10th place as Cardinal); Leads all NL catchers 134 Hits, 78 RBIs (2017)	September 19	
Yadier Molina	1,728 Hits (passes Jim Bottomley 1922–1932, for 10th place as Cardinal)	September 20	
Dexter Fowler	18 Home Runs, a career high	September 20	
Luke Weaver	7 Consecutive Wins by a Cardinals' Rookie (longest since Ted Wilks (11, 1944); Weaver 7–1, 2.05 ERA)	September 20	
Tommy Pham	First Cardinals' player since 1900 to have 20 HRs, 20 doubles, 20 Stolen Bases, and .300 batting average (23 HR, 22 Doubles, 25 Stolen Bases, .306 BA)	October 1	

== Executives and Club officials ==
Source: Cardinals front office (archived)

Executive officers

- Chairman and chief executive officer: William DeWitt Jr.
- President: Bill DeWitt III
- Senior vice president and general counsel: Mike Whittle
- Vice president of business development: Dan Good

Baseball Operations department

- President of Baseball Operations: John Mozeliak (promoted from GM on June 30, 2017)
- General Manager (GM) / Senior VP of Baseball Operations: Mike Girsch (June 30- )
- Assistant General Manager: Moisés Rodriguez (promoted from Director of International Relations on Sep. 27)
- Senior special assistants to the GM: Bob Gebhard, Mike Jorgensen, Red Schoendienst
- Special assistants to the GM: Ryan Franklin, Willie McGee, Jose Oquendo
- Director of player development: Gary LaRocque
- Director of baseball administration: John Vuch
- Administrator, Minor League Operations: Tony Ferreira
- Director of scouting: Randy Flores
- Special Assistant to Amateur Scouting: Mike Roberts
- Amateur Scouting Analyst: Matthew Bayer
- Analyst, Baseball Operations: Tyler Hadzinsky
- Manager, Professional Scouting: Jared Odom
- Director of International Operations: Moisés Rodríguez (promoted to Asst. GM on Sep. 27)
- Assistant director of international scouting: Luís Morales
- Director, Baseball Analytics and Systems: Jeremy Cohen
- Director, Baseball Development: Dane Sorensen
- Analysts, Baseball Development analysts: Kevin Seats, Brian Seyfert
- Manager, Baseball Systems: Patrick Casanta
- Director of player personnel: Matt Slater
- Director of Major League administration: Judy Carpenter-Barada
- Director of Performance: Robert Butler

Manager/Coaching Staff

- Field Manager: Mike Matheny
- Pitching Coach: Derek Lilliquist
- Hitting Coach: John Mabry
- Assistant Hitting Coach: Bill Mueller ( −6/9, 6/27- ), (Mark Budaska, Jun. 9–27)
- First-Base Coach: Oliver Marmol
- Third-Base Coach: Mike Shildt
- Bench Coach: David Bell
- Bullpen Coach: Blaise Ilsley
- Assistant coach: Ron "Pop" Warner
- Quality Control Coach:
- Bullpen Catcher/Catching Instructor: Jamie Pogue
- Strength/Cond. Coach: Pete Prinzi

Medical Staff

- Head Athletic Trainer: Adam Olsen
- Assistant Athletic Trainers: Chris Conroy, Jeremy Clipperton
- Head Orthopedic Surgeon: George Paletta, MD
- Team Orthopedist: Lyndon Gross, MD
- Team Orthopedist: Julienne Lippe, MD
- Team Orthopedist: Husam Nawas, MD
- Team Internist: Joshua Binek, MD
- Primary Care Sport Medicine and MiLB Liaison: Brian Mahaffey, MD
- Team Physician: Charles Rehm, MD
- Team Physician: Alok Sengupta, MD
- Senior Medical Advisor: Barry Weinberg
- Physical Therapist: Thomas Knox
- Performance Specialist: Jason Shutt

Clubhouse Staff

- Equipment managers: Ernie Moore, Mark Walsh
- Traveling secretary: C. J. Cherre
- Visiting clubhouse manager: Rip Rowan
- Video coordinator, major leagues: Chad Blair
- Assistant video coordinator, major leagues: Ben Bultmann

Communications department

- Vice president: Ron Watermon
- Director: Brian Bartow

Cardinals Care and community relations department

- Vice president for community relations and executive director for Cardinals Care: Michael Hall
- Vice president for event services and merchandising: Vicki Bryant

Finance and administration department

- Senior vice president and chief financial officer: Brad Wood

Stadium Operations department

- Vice president: Matt Gifford

Ticket sales, marketing and corporate sales department

- Senior vice president of sales and marketing: Dan Farrell

== Minor league system and first-year player draft ==
=== Teams ===
Level	Team	League	Division	Manager	W–L/Stats	Standing	Refs
AAA	Memphis Redbirds	Pacific Coast	American–South	Stubby Clapp	91–50 (.645)	1st (PCL championship)	
AA	Springfield Cardinals	Texas	North	Johnny Rodriguez			
A+	Palm Beach Cardinals	Florida State	South	Dann Bilardello	74–60 (.552)		
A	Peoria Chiefs	Midwest	Western	Chris Swauger			
A (SS)	State College Spikes	New York–Penn	Pinckney	Joe Kruzel			
Rookie	Johnson City Cardinals	Appalachian	West	Roberto Espinoza			
Rookie	GCL Cardinals	Gulf Coast	East	Steve Turco			
Rookie	DSL Cardinals	Dominican Summer	Boca Chica North	Frey Peniche			

=== Major League Baseball draft ===
The 2017 Major League Baseball (MLB) First-Year Player Draft will begin on June 12, 2017, at Secaucus, New Jersey. The draft assigned amateur baseball players to MLB teams.

With the worst record in the 2016 MLB season, the Minnesota Twins received the first overall pick. In addition, compensation picks will be distributed for players who did not sign from the 2016 MLB draft.

MLB Network will broadcast the first 36 picks (Round 1 and Competitive Balance Round A), while MLB.com will stream all 75 picks on Day 1. MLB.com will also provide live pick-by-pick coverage of Rounds 3–10 on Day 2, starting at 12 p.m. CT. Rounds 11–40 can be heard live on MLB.com on Wednesday, beginning at 11 a.m. CT.

For the first time since 2002, the Cardinals will not be making a selection in the first round. Under the Collective Bargaining Agreement, each team has an allotted bonus pool equal to the sum of the values of that club's selections in the first 10 rounds of the Draft. The more picks a team has, and the earlier it picks, the larger the pool. The signing bonuses for a team's selections in the first 10 rounds, plus any bonus greater than $125,000 for a player taken after the 10th round, will apply toward the bonus-pool total.

Any team going up to five percent over its allotted pool will be taxed at a 75-percent rate on the overage. A team that overspends by 5–10 percent gets a 75-percent tax plus the loss of a first-round pick. A team that goes 10–15 percent over its pool amount will be hit with a 100-percent penalty on the overage and the loss of a first- and second-round pick. Any overage of 15 percent or more gets a 100-percent tax plus the loss of first-round picks in the next two drafts. The Cardinals have the lowest bonus pool money of any team. The value assigned to the Cardinals' first pick (No. 94) is $570,900.

The Cardinals made 30 picks on Day 3 (June 14) drafting 38 players because of no picks in rounds one and two. Eight of those were high schoolers. Twenty-two (22) of their 38 picks were pitchers: seven lefties and 15 righties; no pitchers before the eighth round. Their total bonus pool ($2.176 million) was significantly lower than all the others. Because of this financial limitations, it drew the club to more college seniors who are considered easier signees, of which the Cardinals drafted 16. The breakdown of 16 position players includes: four catchers, six middle infielders, two third basemen, and four outfielders. The Cardinals now start scouring the country for talent ahead of the 2018 Draft, and will work against a July 7 (4 p.m. CT) deadline to sign members of this year's class.

There were 1,215 players drafted, 771 (63.5%) from 4-year schools, 312 from high school (25.7%), 130 from junior college, and 2 from no schools. Pitching, as usual, ruled the draft, with 660 (54.3%) of the total. 472 RH, and 188 LH. Next in declining order were: OF 205, SS 100, C 99, 3B 61, 2B 42, 1B 37, and Utility 5.

Thirteen draftees were signed by June 19. All 13 players who agreed to terms have been placed on either the State College Spikes (PA) Short Season, or Johnson City Cardinals (TN) Rookie roster. Both of the short-season clubs open play this week.

2017 Draft Order

2017 St. Louis Cardinals complete draft list

Round	Pick	Name, Age	Pos / Bats	School (State)	Bonus amount	Date sgnd.	Notes	Refs
3	94	Scott Hurst, 21	CF / L	Cal State-Fullerton (CA)	$450,000; Value: $570,900	@6/14drft -> Jun 28	.332/.424/.585 12 HR,39 RBI 34BB/33SO, 61 G.328/.419/.575 12 HR,40 RBI 35BB/36SO, 63 G	
4	124	Kramer Robertson, 22	SS / R	LSU (LA)	$150,000; Value: $424,800	Jun 28	.319; 8 HR, 43 RBI's, .504 SLG; 63 G	
5	154	Zach Kirtley, 20	2B / R	Saint Mary's (CA)	$317,100; Value: $317,100	Jun 20	.292; 5 HR, 42 RBI's, .433 OBP	
6	184	Zach Jackson, 19	C / L	Winter Haven High School (FL)	$400,000; Value: $243,500	Jun 28	.441; 9 HR, 26 RBI 95 PA-senior.Forgo FL.	
7	214	Chase Pinder, 21	CF / R	Clemson (SC)	$300,000; Value: $190,700	Jun 22	.305; 7 HR, 32 RBI's, .883 OPS; 61 G	
8	244	Wilberto Rivera, 18	RHP / R	Carlos Beltrán Baseball Acad. (PR)	$350,000; Value: $155,600	July 2	6' 3", 207 lbs. Forgo commit. to FIU	
9	274	Evan Kruczynski, 22	LHP / L	East Carolina (NC)	$3,000 Val: $140,600	Jun 16	4.47 ERA, 10 starts; 48 K's; 56.1 IP	
10	304	Brett Seeburger, 22	LHP / L	San Diego State (CA)	$3,000; Value: $132,800	Jun 19	10–3, 4.55 ERA, 15 starts; 93.1 IP	
11	334	Evan Mendoza, 20	3B / R (RHP)	NC State (NC)	$150,000; Value: $125,000	Jun 18	.262 BA, 5 HR, 35 RBI; .397 SLG; 61G	
12	364	Andrew Summerville, 21	LHP / L	Stanford (CA)		Jun 22	5–2, 4.10 ERA; 13 starts; 69 K's in 74.2 IP	
13	394	Jacob Patterson, 21	LHP / R	Texas Tech (TX)		Jun 18	3.86 ERA; avg. 11.0/K per 9 IP; 51.1 IP	
14	424	Donivan Williams, 17	3B / R	Harold L. Richards HS (IL)	$300,000; Value: $125,000	July 1		
15	454	Terry Fuller, 18	LF / L [CF, senior]	Griffin High School (GA)	$200,000; Val: $125,000	Jun 22	6'4" 240 lbs .625/.800 BA/OBP;13HR; 40 RBI	
16	484	Jake Walsh, 21	RHP / R	Florida Southern (FL)		Jun 19	12–1, 2.62 ERA; 16 starts; 104 K's; 99.2 IP	
17	514	Will Latcham, 21	RHP / R	Coastal Carolina (SC)		Jun 18	1.05 ERA in 25.2 IP; 29 K's	
18	544	Shane McCarthy, 20	RHP / R	Seton Hall (NJ)			3–7, 5.13 ERA, 12 starts '17; PG '16	
19	574	Irving Lopez, 21	2B / S	FL Int'l University (FL)		Jun 19	.319 BA, 6 HR, 43 RBI's; 904 OPS	
20	604	Brandon Benson, 23	OF / R	GA College & State Univ.(GA)		Jun 18	.395, 22 home runs, .824 SLG in '16	
21	634	Jake Dahlberg, 23	LHP / L	Univ. of Illinois-Chicago (IL)		Jun 20	10–2, 2.17 ERA in 16G	
22	664	Kevin Hamann, 23	RHP / R	Lewis–Clark State College (ID)		Jun 20	3.62 ERA 7 starts; 1 CG	
23	694	Evan Guillory, 21	RHP / R	Univ. of Louisiana-Lafayette (LA)		Jun 19	4–3, 3.57 ERA starter (6), and relief. 19G	
24	724	Thomas St. Clair, 23	RHP / R	Lenoir-Rhyne University (NC)		Jun 19	10–4, 2.28 ERA, 3 CG, 13 starts '17.	
25	754	Patrick Dayton, 21	LHP / L	Kent State University (OH)		Jun 19	2.77 ERA, 4 Saves in 26 IP; 23 G '17	
26	784	Paul Balestrieri, 22	RHP / R	Cornell University (NY)		Jun 19	5–4, 2.18 ERA, 9 starts in '17.	
27	814	Kodi Whitley, 22	RHP / R	University of Mount Olive (NC)		Jun 20	3 relief appear., 5.1 IP. TJ surgery '16.	
28	844	Cameron Saylor, 23	RHP / R	San Diego State (CA)		Jun 20	2.45 ERA, 13 SV, 32 relief, 40 IP '17	
29	874	Wood Myers, 22	2B / L	Coastal Carolina University (SC)		Jun 19	.330; 43 RBI in 53 G	
30	904	Alex Fagalde, 23	RHP / R	Univ. of California-Riverside (CA)		Jun 22	7–4, 3.39 ERA; 11 starts; CG ShO	
31	934	Saul Garza, 19	C / R	Edinburg North High School (TX)				
32	964	Cameron Knight, 22	C / R	Univ. of Arkansas-Little Rock (AR)		Jun 20	.310 (2 yrs.), .437 SLG ('17)	
33	994	Taylor Bryant, 22	2B / R	California State-Fullerton (CA)		Jun 25	.266, 3 HR, .382 OBP; Scott Hurst teammate	
34	1024	Cory Malcolm, 22	RHP / R	Univ. of Arkansas-Little Rock (AR)		Jun 22	4–5. 3.46 ERA, 14 starts	
35	1054	Alex Gallegos, 19	RHP / R	Torrance High School (CA)		Jun 26	6' 3". Unlikely to sign with the team.	
36	1084	Michael Brdar, 23	SS / R	University of Michigan (MI)		Jun 19	.310, 37 RBI in all 59 G '17	
37	1114	Adam Kerner, 18	C / R	Oaks Christian HS (CA)			5' 11", 175 lbs. Quick, athletic. U. San Diego comm.	
38	1144	Jim Voyles, 22	RHP / R	Florida State University (FL)		Jun 27	6' 7". 4.46 ERA; 36.1 IP, 26 relief appear.	
39	1174	Christopher Hunt, 22	RHP / R	Henderson State University (AR)		Jun 20	7–5, 4.78 ERA; 14 starts in '17	
40	1204	Austin Pollock, 18	LHP / L	Lincoln HS (FL)			6' 3", 183 lbs. Unlikely to sign. FL St.Univ. commit	

=== Free agents signed ===
Non-drafted free agents signed

Name, age	Position / Bats	School (state)	Bonus amount	Date signed	Notes	Refs
Hector Soto, 18	RHP / R			Nov. 8, 2016	6' 1", 175 lbs. born Tepic, (Nayarit), Mexico	
Zach Phillips, 30	LHP / L			Nov. 18, 2016	Drafted 2004, Texas Rangers	
Kendry Flores, 24	RHP / R			Nov. 18, 2016	born in Azua, Dominican Republic	
Mark Montgomery, 26	RHP / R			April 3	Drafted in 2011, New York Yankees, 11th rd.	
Rangel Ravelo, 24	1B / R			April 7	Drafted in 2010, Chicago White Sox, 6th rd.	
Nick Neumann, 25	RHP / R			April 14	Drafted in 2014, Pittsburgh Pirates, 28th rd.	
Dionis Zamora, 20	RHP / R			June 2	born in Caracas, Venezuela	
Hector Mendoza, 23	RHP / R	n/a	$500,000	June 7	Nippon Professional Baseball League (Japan, 2014–2016)	
Joe Gomez, 22	C / S	University of Miami (FL)		June 20		
Gabriel Gentner, 21	RHP / R	California State-Los Angeles (CA)		June 21		
Robbie Coman, 23	C / R	University of Virginia (VA)		June 22		
Austin Warner, 22	LHP / L	Bellarmine University (KY)		June 23	River City Rascals (O'Fallon, MO)	
Sander Mora, 16	SS / R		$300,000	July 2	5' 9", 155 lbs., born in Yaracuy, Venezuela	
Darlyn Del Villar, 16	SS / R			July 2	6' 0", 176 lbs., born in Santo Domingo, Dominican Republic	
Luis Rodriguez, 17	C / R			July 2	5' 11", 167 lbs., born in Punto Fijo, Venezuela	
Gustavo Rodriguez, 17	OF / R			July 2	6' 1", 182 lbs., born in Mao, Dominican Republic	
Joerlin De Los Santos, 16	CF / R			July 2	5' 11", 175 lbs., born in Santo Domingo, Dominican Republic	
Jose Zapata, 16	C / R			July 2	5' 11", 195 lbs., born in Ocumare del Tuy, Venezuela	
Adanson Cruz, 16	OF / R		$300,000	July 2	6' 2", 175 lbs., born in Puerto Plata, Dominican Republic	
Jesus Orecchia, 16	C / R		$300,000	July 2	6' 1", 175 lbs., born in Aragua, Venezuela	
Leudy Pena, 16	OF / L		$300,000	July 2	6' 3", 197 lbs., born in Nigua, Dominican Republic	
Jesus Cruz, 22	RHP / R			July 2	8.49 ERA, 17 H, 7 W, 11 K, 11.2 IP (13G) Monterrey Sultans, Mexico	
Francisco Hernandez, 17	3B / R			July 7	5' 11", 190 lbs., born in Montreal, Quebec, Canada	

The Cardinals have $5.75 million in bonus pool money to spend in the international market from now until June 15, 2018. They have already traded a portion of that away.
