= 2017 Chicago Cubs season =

2017 Chicago Cubs
- National League Central champions
- League: National League
- Division: Central
- Ballpark: Wrigley Field
- City: Chicago
- Record: 92–70 (.568)
- Divisional place: 1st
- Owners: Tom Ricketts
- President of baseball operations: Theo Epstein
- General managers: Jed Hoyer
- Managers: Joe Maddon
- Television: WGN-TV; CSN Chicago; CSN Chicago Plus; WLS-TV (Len Kasper, Jim Deshaies)
- Radio: WSCR (AM); Chicago Cubs Radio Network (Pat Hughes, Ron Coomer, Mark Grote)
- Stats: ESPN.com; Baseball Reference

The 2017 Chicago Cubs season was the 146th season of the Chicago Cubs franchise, the 142nd in the National League and the Cubs' 102nd season at Wrigley Field. The Cubs were managed by Joe Maddon, in his third year as Cubs manager, and played their home games at Wrigley Field as members of the National League Central.

The Cubs were the defending World Series champions, having defeated the Cleveland Indians in the 2016 World Series.

The Cubs began the season on April 2, 2017, at the St. Louis Cardinals and finished the regular season October 1 at home against the Cincinnati Reds. The Cubs finished the season 92–70 in first place in the Central Division. With a win over the Cardinals on September 27, the Cubs won the division title for the second consecutive year.

The Cubs defeated the Washington Nationals in the NLDS three games to two to advance to face the Los Angeles Dodgers in the NLCS in a rematch of the previous year's series. In the best of seven NLCS, the Cubs lost to the Dodgers four games to one.

== Previous season ==
The Cubs finished the 2016 season 103–58 in first place in the Central Division, reaching the playoffs for the second consecutive season. The Cubs defeated the San Francisco Giants three games to one in the National League Division Series. In the National League Championship Series, the Cubs defeated the Los Angeles Dodgers four games to two to advance the franchise's first World Series since 1945. In the World Series, the Cubs rallied from a three games to one deficit to defeat the Cleveland Indians to win the World Series for the first time since 1908.

== Offseason ==
=== Wrigley Field renovations ===
The Cubs continued their $500 million, multiyear renovation project at Wrigley Field. Changes to the stadium for the 2017 season included:

- Relocated bullpens – Both bullpens, previously located down the first and third base lines, have been moved to their new locations under the bleachers in left (home bullpen) and right (visitor bullpen). The bullpens have windows that allow fans in the bleachers to look into each bullpen. Green-tinted transparent doors lead on to the field which allow the players see the game action, but cannot be seen through from the field.
- New rows of seats – Where the bullpens were located, down each line, four rows of seats were added.
- Seats behind home plate replaced – All seating in the lower bull behind home plate were replaced. An area underneath the seats will eventually become the American Airlines 1914 Club. Of the new seats, 700 were padded will be part of the Club in 2018.
- Partial facade restoration – The facade facing Addison Street was restored to match earlier changes to the west facade.
- Concourse replaced – The right field concourse was replaced with new bathrooms and additional concession stands.
- Office building and The Park at Wrigley – To the west of Wrigley Field, the Cubs built a new office building for organization offices. A plaza named The Park at Wrigley with stores and video monitors was added and can be used by the neighborhood when the Cubs are not playing at home.

=== Transactions ===
==== November 2016 ====
November 6	Declined to exercise option on RHP Jason Hammel.
November 6	OF Dexter Fowler declined his mutual option with the club.
November 7	RHP Jose Rosario was added to the 40-man roster from AAA Iowa.
November 7	RHP Conor Mullee was claimed off waiver from the New York Yankees. On the same day, RHP Aaron Brooks and IF Christian Villaneuva were activated from the 60-day DL. Also on November 7, the Cubs activated RHP Dallas Beeler from the 60-day DL and outrighted him to AAA Iowa. RHP Andury Acevedo and C Tim Federowicz were also sent outright to AAA Iowa the same day.
November 19	Claimed LHP David Rollins off waivers from the Seattle Mariners. The contracts of LHP Jack Leathersich, OF Jacob Hannemann, C Victor Caratini, and RHP Duane Underwood Jr. were selected.
November 20	Signed OF Jon Jay to a one-year contract.

==== December 2016 ====
December 2	Declined to tender a 2017 contract to LHP Gerardo Concepcion, LHP Zac Rosscup, RHP Conor Mullee, and INF Christian Villanueva. Agreed to terms with LHP Brian Duensing on a one-year contract.
December 7	Traded OF Jorge Soler to the Kansas City Royals for RHP Wade Davis.
December 8	Acquired LHP Caleb Smith from the Milwaukee Brewers for cash.
December 14	RHP Koji Uehara agreed to terms on a one-year contract.
December 16	Named Desi Wilson and Mariano Duncan hitting coaches for AAA Iowa; Jacob Cruz hitting coach, Ricardo Medina assistant coach, and Mike McNulty athletic trainer for AA Tennessee; Guillermo Martinez hitting coach and Ty Wright assistant coach for A Myrtle Beach; Brian Lawrence pitching coach, Jeremy Farrell hitting coach, Jonathan Mota assistant coach, Logan Severson athletic trainer, and Ryan Nordtvedt strength coach for A South Bend; David Rosario pitching coach, Juan Cabreja hitting coach, and James Edwards athletic trainer for A Eugene; Armando Gabino pitching coach, Osmin Melendez hitting coach, Leo Perez assistant coach, Ben Carhart rehab coach and Sean Folan athletic trainer for Mesa.

==== January 2017 ====
January 14	Named former C David Ross as a special assistant to baseball operations. Agreed to terms on one-year contracts with RHP Héctor Rondón and RHP Justin Grimm.
January 17	RHP Dylan Floro was claimed off waivers from the Tampa Bay Rays.

==== February 2017 ====
February 1	Traded RHP James Farris and international bonus money slot number 28 to the Colorado Rockies for RHP Eddie Butler and international bonus money slot number 74. Designated RHP Dylan Floro for assignment.
February 3	Assigned RHP Dylan Floro to Iowa.
February 8	Designated LHP David Rollins for assignment.
February 10	Promoted Kyle Evans to director of pro scouting/special assistant to the president and general manager; Alex Suarez to director of international pro scouting, assistant director of player development and international amateur scouting; Jason Parks to special assistant to the president and general manager; Greg Davey, promoted to coordinator, baseball operations; Albert Lyu to developer, research and development; Andrew Bassett to assistant director, pro scouting; Min Sung to supervisor, Pacific Rim scouting/special assignment professional scout; John Baker to coordinator, mental skills; Jason Cooper to special assignment scout; Jake Ciarrachi to MLB scout; Shane Farrell to Upper Midwest area.
February 14	Assigned LHP David Rollins outright to Iowa.
February 24	Agreed to terms with RHP Pedro Strop on a one-year contract for 2018 to avoid arbitration.

==== March 2017 ====
March 7	Assigned RHPs Andury Acevedo, Daniel Corcino, Fernando Rodriguez and Ryan Williams; and LHPs Gerardo Concepcion and Manny Parra to their minor league camp.
March 10	Agreed to terms with RHPs Aaron Brooks, Jake Buchanan, Eddie Butler, Carl Edwards Jr., Kyle Hendricks, Pierce Johnson, Alec Mills, Felix Pena, Jose Rosario, and Duane Underwood Jr.; LHPs Jack Leathersich, Mike Montgomery, Caleb Smith, and Rob Zastryzny; Cs Victor Caratini, Willson Contreras and Kyle Schwarber; INFs Javier Báez, Kris Bryant, Jeimer Candelario, Tommy La Stella, and Addison Russell; and OFs Albert Almora Jr., Jacob Hannemann, and Matt Szczur on one-year contracts.
March 14	Released RHP Maikel Cleto. Also optioned RHPs Aaron Brooks and Jose Rosario and LHP Jack Leathersich to Iowa (PCL) and RHP Duane Underwood Jr. to Tennessee. Assigned RHPs Seth Frankoff, Casey Kelly, Jhondaniel Medina and Conor Mullee, and LHP Rosscup to their minor league camp.
March 17	Optioned RHPs Pierce Johnson and Felix Pena, C Victor Caratini and OF Jacob Hannemann to Iowa. Assigned INF Chesny Young and OFs Eloy Jimenez and Mark Zagunis to their minor league camp.
March 23	Released RHP Jim Henderson. Optioned RHPs Jake Buchanan and Alec Mills, and INF Jeimer Candelario to Iowa. Assigned RHPs Williams Perez and Dylan Floro and LHP David Rollins to minor league camp.
March 28	Optioned RHP Eddie Butler and LHP Rob Zastryzny to Iowa. Assigned INF Ian Happ, OF John Andreoli and C Taylor Davis to their minor league camp.
March 29	Released INF Munenori Kawasaki.
March 29	Placed LHP Brian Duensing on the 10-day disabled list to start the season.

== Regular season ==
=== Game log ===
2017 regular season game log: 92–70 (Home: 48–33; Away: 44–37)
April: 13–11 (Home: 4–5; Away: 9–6)

#	Date	Opponent	Score	Win	Loss	Save	Attendance	Record	Box/ Streak
1	April 2	@ Cardinals	3–4	Oh (1–0)	**Montgomery** (0–1)	—	47,566	0–1	L1
2	April 4	@ Cardinals	2–1	**Arrieta** (1–0)	Wainwright (0–1)	**Davis** (1)	46,760	1–1	W1
—	April 5	@ Cardinals	**Postponed (rain)** (Makeup date: April 6)						
3	April 6	@ Cardinals	6–4	**Lackey** (1–0)	Cecil (0–1)	**Davis** (2)	44,039	2–1	W2
4	April 7	@ Brewers	1–2 (11)	Hughes (1–0)	**Montgomery** (0–2)	—	28,728	2–2	L1
5	April 8	@ Brewers	11–6	**Hendricks** (1–0)	Mariñez (0–2)	—	43,080	3–2	W1
6	April 9	@ Brewers	7–4	**Arrieta** (2–0)	Davies (0–2)	—	38,483	4–2	W2
7	April 10	Dodgers	3–2	**Davis** (1–0)	Romo (0–1)	—	41,166	5–2	W3
8	April 12	Dodgers	0–2	McCarthy (2–0)	**Lackey** (1–1)	Jansen (2)	40,844	5–3	L1
9	April 13	Dodgers	4–0	**Anderson** (1–0)	Ryu (0–2)	—	38,379	6–3	W1
10	April 14	Pirates	2–4	Cole (1–1)	**Hendricks** (1–1)	Watson (3)	40,430	6–4	L1
11	April 15	Pirates	7–8	Williams (1–0)	**Strop** (0–1)	Watson (4)	41,814	6–5	L2
12	April 16	Pirates	1–6	Taillon (1–0)	**Uehara** (0–1)	—	39,422	6–6	L3
13	April 17	Brewers	3–6	Anderson (2–0)	**Lackey** (1–2)	Feliz (5)	38,636	6–7	L4
14	April 18	Brewers	9–7	**Grimm** (1–0)	Hughes (1–1)	**Davis** (3)	39,026	7–7	W1
15	April 19	Brewers	7–4	**Davis** (2–0)	Feliz (0–2)	—	34,864	8–7	W2
16	April 21	@ Reds	6–5 (11)	**Edwards Jr.** (1–0)	Stephenson (0–1)	**Davis** (4)	29,350	9–7	W3
17	April 22	@ Reds	12–8	**Arrieta** (3–0)	Reed (1–1)	—	27,189	10–7	W4
18	April 23	@ Reds	5–7	Arroyo (2–2)	**Lackey** (1–3)	—	32,670	10–8	L1
19	April 24	@ Pirates	14–3	**Anderson** (2–0)	Kuhl (1–2)	—	13,445	11–8	W1
20	April 25	@ Pirates	1–0	**Hendricks** (2–1)	Cole (1–3)	**Davis** (5)	15,236	12–8	W2
21	April 26	@ Pirates	5–6	LeBlanc (1–0)	**Lester** (0–1)	Watson (7)	16,904	12–9	L1
22	April 28	@ Red Sox	4–5	Pomeranz (2–1)	**Arrieta** (3–1)	Kimbrel (8)	37,054	12–10	L2
23	April 29	@ Red Sox	7–4	**Lackey** (2–3)	Wright (1–4)	**Davis** (6)	36,776	13–10	W1
24	April 30	@ Red Sox	2–6	Barnes (3–0)	**Uehara** (0–2)	—	36,916	13–11	L1

May: 12–16 (Home: 10–6; Away: 2–10)

#	Date	Opponent	Score	Win	Loss	Save	Attendance	Record	Box/ Streak
25	May 1	Phillies	2–10	Velasquez (2–2)	**Anderson** (2–1)	—	38,567	13–12	L2
26	May 2	Phillies	8–3	**Lester** (1–1)	Hellickson (4–1)	—	38,660	14–12	W1
27	May 3	Phillies	5–4	**Arrieta** (4–1)	Eickhoff (0–3)	**Davis** (7)	39,335	15–12	W2
28	May 4	Phillies	5–4 (13)	**Uehara** (1–2)	Rodríguez (1–1)	—	36,397	16–12	W3
29	May 5	Yankees	2–3	Holder (1–0)	**Rondón** (0–1)	Chapman (7)	40,395	16–13	L1
30	May 6	Yankees	6–11	Montgomery (2–1)	**Anderson** (2–2)	—	40,735	16–14	L2
31	May 7	Yankees	4–5 (18)	Shreve (1–0)	**Strop** (0–2)	—	40,584	16–15	L3
—	May 8	@ Rockies	**Postponed (rain)** (Makeup date: May 9)						
32	May 9 (1)	@ Rockies	4–10	Senzatela (5–1)	**Arrieta** (4–2)	—	34,779	16–16	L4
33	May 9 (2)	@ Rockies	8–1	**Lackey** (3–3)	Freeland (3–2)	—	36,563	17–16	W1
34	May 10	@ Rockies	0–3	Márquez (1–2)	**Hendricks** (2–2)	Holland (14)	35,213	17–17	L1
35	May 12	@ Cardinals	3–2	**Butler** (1–0)	Leake (4–2)	**Davis** (8)	47,601	18–17	W1
36	May 13	@ Cardinals	3–5	Martínez (3–3)	**Lester** (1–2)	Oh (10)	47,882	18–18	L1
37	May 14	@ Cardinals	0–5	Wainwright (3–3)	**Arrieta** (4–3)	—	47,925	18–19	L2
38	May 16	Reds	9–5	**Lackey** (4–3)	Arroyo (3–3)	—	40,653	19–19	W1
39	May 17	Reds	7–5	**Hendricks** (3–2)	Feldman (2–4)	**Davis** (9)	38,715	20–19	W2
40	May 18	Reds	9–5	**Lester** (2–2)	Garrett (3–3)	**Uehara** (1)	36,023	21–19	W3
41	May 19	Brewers	3–6	Peralta (5–2)	**Montgomery** (0–3)	Torres (1)	36,923	21–20	L1
—	May 20	Brewers	**Postponed (rain)** (Makeup date: July 6)						
42	May 21	Brewers	13–6	**Arrieta** (5–3)	Anderson (2–1)	—	41,671	22–20	W1
43	May 22	Giants	4–6	Blach (2–2)	**Lackey** (4–4)	Melancon (9)	36,204	22–21	L1
44	May 23	Giants	4–1	**Lester** (3–2)	Cueto (4–4)	—	32,905	23–21	W1
45	May 24	Giants	5–4	**Hendricks** (4–2)	Moore (2–5)	**Davis** (10)	35,617	24–21	W2
46	May 25	Giants	5–1	**Butler** (2–0)	Samardzija (1–6)	**Montgomery** (1)	37,513	25–21	W3
47	May 26	@ Dodgers	0–4	Wood (6–0)	**Arrieta** (5–4)	—	45,017	25–22	L1
48	May 27	@ Dodgers	0–5	McCarthy (5–1)	**Lackey** (4–5)	Stripling (1)	48,322	25–23	L2
49	May 28	@ Dodgers	4–9	Fields (2–0)	**Lester** (3–3)	—	47,732	25–24	L3
50	May 29	@ Padres	2–5	Torres (3–2)	**Hendricks** (4–3)	Maurer (7)	41,414	25–25	L4
51	May 30	@ Padres	2–6	Lamet (2–0)	**Butler** (2–1)	—	33,232	25–26	L5
52	May 31	@ Padres	1–2	Hand (1–3)	**Uehara** (1–3)	Maurer (8)	23,995	25–27	L6

June: 15–13 (Home: 8–5; Away: 7–8)

#	Date	Opponent	Score	Win	Loss	Save	Attendance	Record	Box/ Streak
53	June 2	Cardinals	3–2	**Strop** (1–2)	Rosenthal (1–2)	**Davis** (11)	41,051	26–27	W1
54	June 3	Cardinals	5–3	**Rondón** (1–1)	Leake (5–4)	**Davis** (12)	41,164	27–27	W2
55	June 4	Cardinals	7–6	**Strop** (2–2)	Bowman (1–2)	**Uehara** (2)	39,868	28–27	W3
56	June 5	Marlins	3–1	**Butler** (3–1)	Straily (4–4)	**Montgomery** (2)	34,037	29–27	W4
57	June 6	Marlins	10–2	**Arrieta** (6–4)	Locke (0–1)	—	34,082	30–27	W5
58	June 7	Marlins	5–6	Ureña (4–2)	**Lackey** (4–6)	Ramos (9)	34,294	30–28	L1
59	June 8	Rockies	1–4	Chatwood (6–7)	**Lester** (3–4)	Holland (22)	39,385	30–29	L2
60	June 9	Rockies	3–5	Rusin (3–0)	**Frankoff** (0–1)	Holland (23)	41,229	30–30	L3
61	June 10	Rockies	1–9	Hoffman (4–0)	**Butler** (3–2)	—	41,226	30–31	L4
62	June 11	Rockies	7–5	**Edwards Jr.** (2–0)	Lyles (0–2)	**Davis** (13)	41,116	31–31	W1
63	June 12	@ Mets	1–6	deGrom (5–3)	**Lackey** (4–7)	—	33,268	31–32	L1
64	June 13	@ Mets	14–3	**Lester** (4–4)	Wheeler (3–4)	—	32,651	32–32	W1
65	June 14	@ Mets	4–9	Blevins (4–0)	**Edwards Jr.** (2–1)	—	34,566	32–33	L1
66	June 16	@ Pirates	9–5	**Uehara** (2–3)	Nicasio (1–3)	—	25,420	33–33	W1
67	June 17	@ Pirates	3–4	Nova (7–4)	**Arrieta** (6–5)	Rivero (3)	34,383	33–34	L1
68	June 18	@ Pirates	7–1	**Lackey** (5–7)	Taillon (3–2)	—	34,539	34–34	W1
69	June 19	Padres	3–2	**Rondón** (2–1)	Yates (1–1)	**Davis** (14)	40,802	35–34	W2
70	June 20	Padres	4–0	**Montgomery** (1–3)	Chacín (6–6)	—	41,607	36–34	W3
71	June 21	Padres	2–3	Maton (1–0)	**Uehara** (2–4)	Maurer (13)	41,708	36–35	L1
72	June 22	@ Marlins	11–1	**Arrieta** (7–5)	Locke (0–3)	—	23,472	37–35	W1
73	June 23	@ Marlins	0–2	Urena (6–2)	**Lackey** (5–8)	Ramos (11)	24,684	37–36	L1
74	June 24	@ Marlins	5–3	**Lester** (5–4)	Wittgren (1–1)	**Davis** (15)	25,448	38–36	W1
75	June 25	@ Marlins	2–4	Vólquez (4–8)	**Montgomery** (1–4)	Ramos (12)	25,110	38–37	L1
76	June 26	@ Nationals	5–4	**Butler** (4–2)	González (7–2)	—	29,651	39–37	W1
77	June 27	@ Nationals	1–6	Scherzer (9–5)	**Arrieta** (7–6)	—	31,202	39–38	L1
78	June 28	@ Nationals	4–8	Strasburg (9–2)	**Lackey** (5–9)	—	31,072	39–39	L2
79	June 29	@ Nationals	5–4	**Peña** (1–0)	Treinen (0–2)	**Davis** (16)	37,097	40–39	W1
80	June 30	@ Reds	0–5	Feldman (7–5)	**Montgomery** (1–5)	—	39,501	40–40	L1

July: 16–8 (Home: 5–6; Away: 11–2)

#	Date	Opponent	Score	Win	Loss	Save	Attendance	Record	Box/ Streak
81	July 1	@ Reds	3–5	Stephens (1–0)	**Butler** (4–3)	Iglesias (15)	39,826	40–41	L2
82	July 2	@ Reds	6–2	**Arrieta** (8–6)	Adleman (5–5)	—	38,536	41–41	W1
83	July 4	Rays	5–6	Archer (7–5)	**Lester** (5–5)	Colomé (22)	42,046	41–42	L1
84	July 5	Rays	7–3	**Strop** (3–2)	Ramírez (4–3)	—	39,855	42–42	W1
85	July 6	Brewers	2–11	Davies (10–4)	**Montgomery** (1–6)	—	41,576	42–43	L1
86	July 7	Pirates	6–1	**Edwards Jr.** (3–1)	Williams (3–4)	—	41,294	43–43	W1
87	July 8	Pirates	2–4	Nova (9–6)	**Arrieta** (8–7)	Rivero (6)	41,865	43–44	L1
88	July 9	Pirates	3–14	Schugel (1–0)	**Lester** (5–6)	—	41,604	43–45	L2
**88th All-Star Game in Miami, Florida**
89	July 14	@ Orioles	9–8	**Uehara** (3–4)	Brach (2–2)	**Davis** (17)	34,335	44–45	W1
90	July 15	@ Orioles	10–3	**Arrieta** (9–7)	Miley (4–8)	—	40,258	45–45	W2
91	July 16	@ Orioles	8–0	**Quintana** (5–8)	Jiménez (4–5)	—	31,105	46–45	W3
92	July 17	@ Braves	4–3	**Lester** (6–6)	Teheran (7–7)	**Davis** (18)	41,256	47–45	W4
93	July 18	@ Braves	5–1	**Lackey** (6–9)	Newcomb (1–5)	—	41,541	48–45	W5
94	July 19	@ Braves	8–2	**Montgomery** (2–6)	Dickey (6–6)	—	40,054	49–45	W6
95	July 21	Cardinals	4–11	Bowman (2–3)	**Edwards** (3–2)	—	42,186	49–46	L1
96	July 22	Cardinals	3–2	**Lester** (7–6)	Bowman (2–4)	**Davis** (19)	41,969	50–46	W1
97	July 23	Cardinals	5–3	**Quintana** (6–8)	Wacha (7–4)	**Davis** (20)	41,582	51–46	W2
98	July 24	White Sox	1–3	González (5–9)	**Grimm** (1–1)	Swarzak (1)	40,849	51–47	L1
99	July 25	White Sox	7–2	**Lackey** (7–9)	Rodon (1–4)	—	40,717	52–47	W1
100	July 26	@ White Sox	8–3	**Arrieta** (10–7)	Shields (2–3)	—	38,517	53–47	W2
101	July 27	@ White Sox	6–3	**Lester** (8–6)	Pelfrey (3–8)	—	39,422	54–47	W3
102	July 28	@ Brewers	1–2	Suter (2–1)	**Quintana** (6–9)	Knebel (18)	42,574	54–48	L1
103	July 29	@ Brewers	2–1 (11)	**Montgomery** (3–6)	Hughes (3–3)	**Davis** (21)	44,709	55–48	W1
104	July 30	@ Brewers	4–2	**Lackey** (8–9)	Davies (12–5)	**Davis** (22)	44,269	56–48	W2

August: 17–12 (Home: 11–6; Away: 6–6)

#	Date	Opponent	Score	Win	Loss	Save	Attendance	Record	Box/ Streak
105	August 1	D-backs	16–4	**Rondón** (3–1)	Corbin (8–10)	**Montgomery** (3)	40,709	57–48	W3
106	August 2	D-backs	0–3	Godley (5–4)	**Arrieta** (10–8)	Rodney (23)	41,321	57–49	L1
107	August 3	D-backs	8–10	Barrett (1–0)	**Davis** (2–1)	Rodney (24)	39,525	57–50	L2
108	August 4	Nationals	2–4	Roark (9–7)	**Hendricks** (4–4)	Doolittle (8)	41,396	57–51	L3
109	August 5	Nationals	7–4	**Lackey** (9–9)	Jackson (2–2)	**Davis** (23)	41,857	58–51	W1
110	August 6	Nationals	4–9	Kintzler (3–2)	**Edwards** (3–3)	—	41,047	58–52	L1
111	August 7	@ Giants	5–3	**Arrieta** (11–8)	Moore (3–12)	**Davis** (24)	40,462	59–52	W1
112	August 8	@ Giants	3–6	Blach (8–7)	**Quintana** (2–2)	Dyson (7)	39,864	59–53	L1
113	August 9	@ Giants	1–3	Bumgarner (2–5)	**Duensing** (0–1)	Dyson (8)	41,099	59–54	L2
114	August 11	@ D-backs	8–3	**Lackey** (10–9)	Walker (6–6)	—	39,131	60–54	W1
115	August 12	@ D-backs	2–6	Corbin (9–11)	**Lester** (8–7)	Hernandez (2)	42,219	60–55	L1
116	August 13	@ D-backs	7–2	**Arrieta** (12–8)	Godley (5–5)	—	41,760	61–55	W1
117	August 14	Reds	15–5	**Quintana** (7–10)	Wojciechowski (3–2)	—	40,263	62–55	W2
118	August 15	Reds	1–2	Lorenzen (7–2)	**Strop** (3–3)	Iglesias (21)	36,698	62–56	L1
119	August 16	Reds	7–6	**Davis** (3–1)	Peralta (3–3)	—	37,021	63–56	W1
120	August 17	Reds	10–13	Storen (4–2)	**Grimm** (1–2)	Iglesias (22)	38,675	63–57	L1
121	August 18	Blue Jays	7–4	**Arrieta** (13–8)	Happ (6–9)	**Davis** (25)	41,814	64–57	W1
122	August 19	Blue Jays	4–3	**Quintana** (8–10)	Barnes (2–4)	**Davis** (26)	41,558	65–57	W2
123	August 20	Blue Jays	6–5 (10)	**Wilson** (4–4)	Osuna (3–4)	—	41,459	66–57	W3
124	August 22	@ Reds	13–9	**Rondón** (4–1)	Peralta (3–4)	—	16,467	67–57	W4
125	August 23	@ Reds	9–3	**Montgomery** (4–6)	Wojciechowski (3–3)	—	15,355	68–57	W5
126	August 24	@ Reds	2–4	Lorenzen (8–2)	**Strop** (3–4)	Iglesias (24)	18,191	68–58	L1
127	August 25	@ Phillies	1–7	Eickhoff (4–7)	**Quintana** (8–11)	—	24,424	68–59	L2
128	August 26	@ Phillies	17–2	**Hendricks** (5–4)	Lively (1–5)	—	29,379	69–59	W1
129	August 27	@ Phillies	3–6	Pivetta (5–9)	**Lackey** (10–10)	Neris (16)	28,689	69–60	L1
130	August 28	Pirates	6–1	**Montgomery** (5–6)	Williams (5–7)	—	38,453	70–60	W1
131	August 29	Pirates	4–1	**Arrieta** (14–8)	Kuhl (6–10)	**Davis** (27)	37,370	71–60	W2
132	August 30	Pirates	17–3	**Quintana** (9–11)	Nova (11–12)	—	36,628	72–60	W3
133	August 31	Braves	6–2	**Hendricks** (6–4)	Newcomb (2–8)	—	38,031	73–60	W4

September/October: 19–10 (Home: 10–5; Away: 9–5)

#	Date	Opponent	Score	Win	Loss	Save	Attendance	Record	Box/ Streak
134	September 1	Braves	2–0	**Lackey** (11–10)	Foltynewicz (10–11)	**Davis** (28)	37,280	74–60	W5
135	September 2	Braves	14–12	**Lester** (9–7)	Sims (2–5)	—	41,329	75–60	W6
136	September 3	Braves	1–5	Fried (1–0)	**Montgomery** (5–7)	—	42,145	75–61	L1
137	September 4	@ Pirates	0–12	Kuhl (7–10)	**Arrieta** (14–7)	—	21,068	75–62	L2
138	September 5	@ Pirates	3–4	LeBlanc (5–2)	**Edwards Jr.** (3–4)	Rivero (18)	14,079	75–63	L3
139	September 6	@ Pirates	1–0	**Strop** (4–4)	Hudson (2–6)	**Davis** (29)	17,067	76–63	W1
140	September 7	@ Pirates	8–2	**Lester** (10–7)	Taillon (7–6)	—	19,201	77–63	W2
141	September 8	Brewers	0–2	Nelson (12–6)	**Lackey** (11–11)	Knebel (33)	41,020	77–64	L1
142	September 9	Brewers	2–15	Anderson (9–3)	**Montgomery** (5–8)	—	41,167	77–65	L2
143	September 10	Brewers	1–3	Davies (17–8)	**Hendricks** (6–5)	Knebel (34)	40,113	77–66	L3
144	September 12	Mets	8–3	**Quintana** (10–11)	Gsellman (6–7)	—	37,834	78–66	W1
145	September 13	Mets	17–5	**Lester** (11–7)	Harvey (5–5)	—	36,008	79–66	W2
146	September 14	Mets	14–6	**Montgomery** (6–8)	Lugo (6–5)	—	37,867	80–66	W3
147	September 15	Cardinals	8–2	**Edwards Jr.** (4–4)	Martínez (11–11)	—	38,464	81–66	W4
148	September 16	Cardinals	4–1	**Hendricks** (7–5)	Wacha (12–8)	**Davis** (30)	40,959	82–66	W5
149	September 17	Cardinals	4–3	**Strop** (5–4)	Lyons (4–1)	**Davis** (31)	37,242	83–66	W6
150	September 19	@ Rays	2–1	**Montgomery** (7–8)	Archer (9–11)	**Davis** (32)	25,046	84–66	W7
151	September 20	@ Rays	1–8	Snell (4–6)	**Lester** (11–8)	—	24,238	84–67	L1
152	September 21	@ Brewers	5–3 (10)	**Davis** (4–1)	Drake (3–5)	—	35,114	85–67	W1
153	September 22	@ Brewers	5–4 (10)	**Edwards** (5–4)	Knebel (1–4)	—	40,116	86–67	W2
154	September 23	@ Brewers	3–4 (10)	Jeffress (5–2)	**Davis** (4–2)	—	44,067	86–68	L1
155	September 24	@ Brewers	5–0	**Quintana** (11–11)	Anderson (11–4)	—	42.212	87–68	W1
156	September 25	@ Cardinals	10–2	**Lester** (12–8)	Weaver (7–2)	—	42,516	88–68	W2
157	September 26	@ Cardinals	7–8	Duke (1–1)	**Arrieta** (14–10)	Nicasio (5)	41,944	88–69	L1
158	September 27	@ Cardinals	5–1	**Lackey** (12–11)	Wacha (12–9)	—	42,070	89–69	W1
159	September 28	@ Cardinals	2–1 (11)	**Tseng** (1–0)	Bowman (3–6)	—	43,094	90–69	W2
160	September 29	Reds	5–4	**Duensing** (1–1)	Lorenzen (8–4)	**Grimm** (1)	36,258	91–69	W3
161	September 30	Reds	9–0	**Lester** (13–8)	Stephens (2–1)	—	41,493	92–69	W4
162	October 1	Reds	1–3	McGuire (1–1)	**Lackey** (12–12)	Iglesias (28)	40,971	92–70	L1

Legend: = Win = Loss = Postponement
Bold = Cubs team member

=== Season standings ===
NL Central
Team	W	L	Pct.	GB	Home	Road
Chicago Cubs	92	70	.568	—	48‍–‍33	44‍–‍37
Milwaukee Brewers	86	76	.531	6	46‍–‍38	40‍–‍38
St. Louis Cardinals	83	79	.512	9	44‍–‍37	39‍–‍42
Pittsburgh Pirates	75	87	.463	17	44‍–‍37	31‍–‍50
Cincinnati Reds	68	94	.420	24	39‍–‍42	29‍–‍52

Division leaders
Team	W	L	Pct.
Los Angeles Dodgers	104	58	.642
Washington Nationals	97	65	.599
Chicago Cubs	92	70	.568

Wild Card teams (Top 2 teams qualify for postseason)
Team	W	L	Pct.	GB
Arizona Diamondbacks	93	69	.574	+6
Colorado Rockies	87	75	.537	—
Milwaukee Brewers	86	76	.531	1
St. Louis Cardinals	83	79	.512	4
Miami Marlins	77	85	.475	10
Pittsburgh Pirates	75	87	.463	12
Atlanta Braves	72	90	.444	15
San Diego Padres	71	91	.438	16
New York Mets	70	92	.432	17
Cincinnati Reds	68	94	.420	19
Philadelphia Phillies	66	96	.407	21
San Francisco Giants	64	98	.395	23

=== Record vs. opponents ===
2017 National League record Source: MLB Standings Grid – 2017
Team	AZ	ATL	CHC	CIN	COL	LAD	MIA	MIL	NYM	PHI	PIT	SD	SF	STL	WSH	AL
Arizona	—	2–4	3–3	3–3	11–8	11–8	3–4	4–3	6–1	6–1	4–3	11–8	12–7	3–4	2–4	12–8
Atlanta	4–2	—	1–6	3–3	3–4	3–4	11–8	4–2	7–12	6–13	2–5	5–2	4–3	1–5	9–10	9–11
Chicago	3–3	6–1	—	12–7	2–5	2–4	4–3	10–9	4–2	4–3	10–9	2–4	4–3	14–5	3–4	12–8
Cincinnati	3–3	3–3	7–12	—	3–4	0–6	2–5	8–11	3–4	4–2	13–6	3–4	4–3	9–10	1–6	5–15
Colorado	8–11	4–3	5–2	4–3	—	10–9	2–4	4–3	3–3	5–2	3–3	12–7	12–7	2–4	3–4	10–10
Los Angeles	8–11	4–3	4–2	6–0	9–10	—	6–1	3–3	7–0	4–3	6–1	13–6	11–8	4–3	3–3	16–4
Miami	4–3	8–11	3–4	5–2	4–2	1–6	—	2–4	12–7	8–11	3–4	5–1	5–1	2–5	6–13	9–11
Milwaukee	3–4	2–4	9–10	11–8	3–4	3–3	4–2	—	5–2	3–3	9–10	5–2	3–4	11–8	4–3	11–9
New York	1–6	12–7	2–4	4–3	3–3	0–7	7–12	2–5	—	12–7	3–3	3–4	5–1	3–4	6–13	7–13
Philadelphia	1–6	13–6	3–4	2–4	2–5	3–4	11–8	3–3	7–12	—	2–5	1–5	4–3	1–5	8–11	5–15
Pittsburgh	3–4	5–2	9–10	6–13	3–3	1–6	4–3	10–9	3–3	5–2	—	3–3	1–5	8–11	4–3	10–10
San Diego	8–11	2–5	4–2	4–3	7–12	6–13	1–5	2–5	4–3	5–1	3–3	—	12–7	3–4	2–5	8–12
San Francisco	7–12	3–4	3–4	3–4	7–12	8–11	1–5	4–3	1–5	3–4	5–1	7–12	—	3–4	1–5	8–12
St. Louis	4–3	5–1	5–14	10–9	4–2	3–4	5–2	8–11	4–3	5–1	11–8	4–3	4–3	—	3–3	8–12
Washington	4–2	10–9	4–3	6–1	4–3	3–3	13–6	3–4	13–6	11–8	3–4	5–2	5–1	3–3	—	10–10

=== Opening Day starters ===
Sunday, April 2, 2017, at St. Louis Cardinals

Name	Pos.
Kyle Schwarber	LF
Kris Bryant	3B
Anthony Rizzo	1B
Ben Zobrist	RF
Addison Russell	SS
Jason Heyward	CF
Willson Contreras	C
Jon Lester	P
Javier Báez	2B

=== Season summary ===
==== March ====
- **March 2** – The Cubs announced Jon Lester would be the opening day starter on April 2 vs. St. Louis.

==== April ====
- **April 2** – On opening night in St. Louis, Willson Contreras homered in the ninth to tie the game before the Cubs lost in the bottom half of the ninth. The loss marked the first time since the third game of 2015 that the Cubs record was under .500.
- **April 4** – Jake Arrieta pitched six strong innings while allowing one run against the Cardinals. Jason Heyward and Javier Báez each drove in a run in the fifth as the Cubs won 2–1.
- **April 6** – After a rainout the prior day, John Lackey gave up four runs in six innings, but the Cub bullpen held the Cardinals in check thereafter. Kyle Schwarber hit a three-run home run in the seventh to give the Cubs the lead and Wade Davis got the save as the Cubs won 6–4.
- **April 7** – Kris Bryant flew out to right field in the first inning to move to 0–14 on the season. The start marked the worst start to a season by a reigning MVP. However, the Cubs went into extra innings tied at one against the Milwaukee Brewers at Miller Park. In extra innings, Mike Montgomery threw a wild pitch with the bases loaded to allow the winning run to score as the Cubs fell 2–1.
- **April 8** – The Cub offense awoke in game two against the Brewers as Kris Bryant had three hits and drove in three runs while Willson Contreras, Javier Báez, and Albert Almora Jr. each drove in two. Kyle Hendricks, who chipped in offensively with two hits himself, allowed four runs in six innings of work as the Cubs won easily 11–6.
- **April 9** – In the final game of the series, Addison Russell doubled with the bases loaded and Jason Heyward tripled in the first inning to give the Cubs an early lead on the Brewers. Jake Arrieta pitched seven innings while allowing three runs while Heyward drove in three runs as the Cubs beat the Brewers 7–4.
- **April 10** – On opening night at Wrigley Field against the Los Angeles Dodgers, the Cubs raised their World Series banner following a rain delay of over an hour. Kyle Schwarber walked three times as the Cubs won the game with a walk-off single by Anthony Rizzo in the bottom of the ninth inning 2–1.
- **April 12** – John Lackey gave up a run in the first, but pitched six strong innings as the Cubs struggled against the Dodger pitching, losing 2–0.
- **April 13** – Brett Anderson pitched five innings and allowed no runs as the Cub bullpen also shut out the Dodgers. Anthony Rizzo homered and drove in two runs as Addison Russell also homered leading the Cubs to a 4–0 shutout victory.
- **April 14** – Kyle Hendricks gave up three runs in five innings as the Pittsburgh Pirates came to Chicago. Ben Zobrist and Kyle Schwarber drove in a run each for the Cubs, but it was not enough as the Cubs fell 4–2.
- **April 15** – The Cubs took an early 6–2 lead on the Pirates behind two Kris Bryant home runs and three RBIs, but the Cub bullpen gave up five runs in the seventh as the Cubs lost 8–7.
- **April 16** – The Cubs were swept by the Pirates at Wrigley Field losing 6–1. RHP Koji Uehara gave up three runs in the top of the eighth inning to end his scoreless inning streak at 20 innings. The Cubs fell to .500 on the season.
- **April 17 –** With the Brewers in town, the Cubs lost their fourth straight game, losing 6–3. John Lackey allowed four runs in six innings as the Cub offense struggled. The loss dropped the Cubs record to 6–7, marking the first time they had a losing record that late into a season since their last-place finish in 2014.
- **April 18** – Looking to avoid a fifth straight loss, Brett Anderson gave up six runs in 3.2 innings of work and left the game trailing 5–2. However, Miguel Montero homered to tighten the score and the Cubs pushed across four runs in the sixth inning to beat the Brewers 9–7.
- **April 19** – Kyle Hendricks gave up four runs in five innings and left with the Cubs trailing 4–1. The Cubs battled back and trailed by one entering the ninth inning Kris Bryant drove in the tying run and Addison Russell hit a game-winning, two-out, three-run home run the Cubs came from behind to beat the Brewers 7–4.
- **April 20** – Jon Lester gave up five runs in 5.2 innings as the Cubs traveled to Cincinnati. Trailing the Reds 5–2 in the top of the ninth, Anthony Rizzo hit a three-run game-tying home run to send the game to extra innings. In the 11th, Kris Bryant drove in the winning run on a sacrifice fly as the Cubs extended their winning streak to three games and moved into sole possession of first place.
- **April 21** – The Cubs belted three homers against the Reds including a grand slam by Willson Contreras, his first career grand slam. Anthony Rizzo and Jason Heyward homered for the second straight game as the Cubs extended their winning streak to four games by beating the Reds 12–8. The Cubs have homered in each of their last 14 games in Cincinnati.
- **April 22** – John Lackey gave up seven runs in six innings of work as the Cubs fell to the Red 7–5. Anthony Rizzo homered for the third straight game and drove in two runs, but it was not enough to overcome Lackey's poor start.
- **April 24** – The Cubs traveled to Pittsburgh and jumped early on the Pirates scoring nine runs in the first three innings. Jason Heyward homered for the third straight game and drove in four runs and Ben Zobrist drove in three as the Cubs hammered the Pirates 14–3.
- **April 25** – Kyle Hendricks pitched six strong innings and the Cub bullpen shut out the Pirates. The only run of the game scored on an error by Pirate second baseman Alen Hanson in the second inning as the Cubs won 1–0.
- **April 26** – Looking for the sweep, Jon Lester gave up six runs on 10 hits in 5.2 innings. Anthony Rizzo homered and drove in four runs, but it was not enough as the Cubs fell 6–5.
- **April 28** – In their first interleague game of the year against the Boston Red Sox at Fenway Park, Kris Bryant homered in his first at-bat at Fenway, the stadium where his father, a Red Sox minor-leaguer, proposed to his mom. Jake Arrieta struggled early as the Cubs fell behind 5–1 and lasted only 4.1/innings. Despite a homer by Albert Almora Jr., the Cubs could not complete the comeback, falling 5–4.
- **April 29** – The Cubs, behind homers by Anthony Rizzo, Miguel Montero, and Ben Zobrist, came from behind to beat the Red Sox 7–4. The Cubs remained in first place in their division with a 13–10 record.
- **April 30** – In the ESPN Sunday night game, the Cubs battled back from an early 2–0 deficit to tie the game in the seventh. However, Koji Uehara allowed three runs and Pedro Strop one run in the eighth as the Cubs lost to the Red Sox 6–2.

==== May ====
- **May 1** – Brett Anderson lasted only 1 1/3 innings as the Cubs were blown out 10–2 by the Philadelphia Phillies at Wrigley Field, losing their fourth game in the last five. The loss dropped the Cubs into a tie for the division lead with the Brewers, though the Cubs led by percentage points.
- **May 2** – The Cubs beat the Phillies 8–3 with homers by Kris Bryant, Javier Báez, and Kyle Schwarber. Bryant also left the game late with tightness in his calf. Báez came within a double of hitting for the cycle, with four hits and three RBI. Jon Lester earned his first win of the season, allowing three runs in five innings.
- **May 3** – The Cubs scored four times in the bottom of the sixth after trailing 3–1, highlighted by Willson Contreras' pinch-hit two-run double to take the lead. Contreras then scored from second on an infield hit by Matt Szczur to give the Cubs their fifth run of the game. Jake Arrieta got the win, 5–4 over the Phillies, but allowed two runs in the first inning as Cubs starting pitchers' ERA moved to 11.00 in the first inning.
- **May 4** – Miguel Montero homered in the bottom of the eighth to tie the game at four and the Cubs won in the 13th on an error by Phillies' shortstop Freddy Galvas. Koji Uehara, the eighth Cub pitcher used in the game, got the win with a perfect 13th inning as Albert Almora Jr. scored on an error in the bottom of the 13th. The Cubs moved to 16–12 on the season. Starter John Lackey failed to pitch six innings for the first time on the season, pitching five-plus innings and allowing three runs.
- **May 5** – Brett Gardner hit a three-run home run off of Héctor Rondón in the top of the ninth as the New York Yankees beat the Cubs 3–2 at Wrigley Field. Rondón, who was pitching in the ninth as closer Wade Davis was unavailable after pitching three days in a row, gave up the homer with two outs and two strikes on Gardner. Former Cub closer and current Yankee closer, Aroldis Chapman, got the save for the Yankees.
- **May 6** – Brett Anderson, after getting knocked out in the second inning of his prior start, lasted only 1/3 of an inning as he gave up five runs before leaving with soreness in his lower back. The Cub bullpen, trailing 6–0 after the first and needing a starter to go long because of recent use, could not hold the Yankees at six runs as the Cubs lost 11–6. Miguel Montero pitched a scoreless ninth for the Cubs.
- **May 7** – The Cubs, trailing 4–1 going into the bottom of the ninth, scored three runs off former closer Aroldis Chapman to tie the game and force extra innings. Despite several chances to win the game, the Cubs fell 5–4 in 18 innings, getting swept by the Yankees. The game marked the longest interleague game in MLB history and had the most strikeouts, 48, in a game in MLB history. It was also only the second game ever where both teams had 20 or more strikeouts.
- **May 9** – In the first game of a day-night doubleheader, due to a rainout of the first game of the series at Coors Field, the Colorado Rockies knocked Jake Arrieta out of the game in the fourth, scoring nine runs en route to a 10–4 win over the Cubs. The loss marked the Cubs fourth straight and dropped them to .500 on the season at 16–16.
- **May 9** – In the nightcap of the doubleheader, the Cubs rebounded to win 8–1. John Lackey pitched seven strong innings without giving up a run and striking out 10 Rockies. Javier Báez and Kris Bryant homered as the Cubs moved to 17–16 on the season.
- **May 10** – Following an almost one-hour rain delay, the Cubs were no-hit through six innings and were unable to push across a run, falling 3–0 to the Rockies. The loss left the Cubs with a 17–17 record on the season, having lost five of their previous six games, and in fourth place in the division, 2.5 games behind the Cardinals.
- **May 12** – As the Cubs returned to St. Louis to face the first-place Cardinals, Eddie Butler was called up from the minors to pitch in Brett Anderson's vacated starting spot. Butler pitched six scoreless innings as the Cubs, behind Willson Contreras' two homers, beat the Cardinals 3–2. The win moved the Cubs within 1.5 games of the Cardinals for first place. Kris Bryant was a late scratch before the game due to an illness and his replacement, Jon Jay, left after two innings with back issues.
- **May 13** – Looking to move within a half game of first, but short-handed with Bryant and Jay's issues, the Cubs called up highly touted rookie Ian Happ from AAA Iowa to make his major league debut. Happ homered in the seventh inning, but the Cards has already taken a 5–1 lead off Cub starter Jon Lester and the Cubs bullpen. The Cubs lost 5–3.
- **May 14** – The Cardinal offense teed off against Jake Arrieta in the finale of the series as Yadier Molina hit a two-run home run in the second and Matt Carpenter, a career 1-for-31 against college teammate Arrieta, hit a two-run shot in the third. The Cubs could not push across a run against the Cardinals as Molina homered again in the eighth and the Cubs lost 5–0. The loss moved the Cubs under .500 at 18–19 and put them 3.5 games out of first.
- **May 16** – The Cubs returned home to face the Reds and, with the wind blowing out, seven homers left the park. Happ, Rizzo, Russell, and Schwarber each homered for the Cubs as they out-slugged the Reds 9–5. The win marked Joe Maddon's 1,000th win as a manager.
- **May 17** – For a second straight day, the wind was blowing out at Wrigley, but the Cubs failed to homer. Scoring seven runs on six hits, the Cubs outlasted the Reds 7–5 as Kyle Hendricks pitched a solid six innings while allowing two runs. Hendricks reduced his ERA to 1.82 over his previous five starts. The win put the Cubs back over .500 at 20–19 on the season.
- **May 18** – Javier Báez had three hits and knocked in five runs, including a first-inning grand slam, to lead the Cubs to a 9–5 victory over Cincinnati. Kris Byrant also homered as Jon Lester allowed three runs in six innings.
- **May 19** – Cub pitchers issued 10 walks in a rain-delayed 6–3 loss to the first-place Brewers in Chicago. Three errors also hurt the Cubs as starting pitcher Eddie Butler could not get out of the third inning.
- **May 21** – After a rainout the prior day, Jake Arrieta pitched well, allowing only one run in six innings. Kris Bryant homered twice, while Ben Zobrist homered batting in the leadoff position, and Anthony Rizzo homered as well as the Cubs beat the Brewers 13–6.
- **May 22** – John Lackey gave up five runs in five innings as the San Francisco Giants came to Wrigley for a four-game series. Javier Báez and Ben Zobrist hit two-run homers in the bottom of the eighth to put the Cubs in striking distance, but they could muster no more and fell 6–4.
- **May 23** – Jon Lester pitched a complete game, allowing only one run on 99 pitches as the Cubs defeated the Giants 4–1. Schwarber, Heyward, and Rizzo homered for the Cubs in a game whose start was delayed an hour by rain.
- **May 24** – Anthony Rizzo homered twice and the Cubs survived a rough ninth inning by Wade Davis to beat the Giants 5–4. Davis gave up his first earned runs on the season by allowing a two-run homer to Mac Williamson, but recovered to save a strong performance by Kyle Hendricks (two runs in seven innings). The win put the Cubs at 24–21 on the season.
- **May 25** – The Cubs beat the Giants 5–1 to go 7–2 on their homestand. Kris Bryant, Jason Heyward, and Ben Zobrist all homered for the Cubs as they moved to four games over .500 on the season.
- **May 26** – The Cubs were shut out by the Dodgers in Los Angeles, 4–0. Jake Arrieta struggled again for the Cubs as he gave five hits and four runs in six innings. The Cubs only managed two hits in the game.
- **May 27** – For the second consecutive game, the Cubs were shut out by the Dodgers, only managing three hits as they fell 5–0. John Lackey struggled for the Cubs, giving up five runs and six hits while walking four.
- **May 28** – The Cubs offense finally came alive as it homered three times off of Dodger ace Clayton Kershaw, but Jon Lester gave up a pair of three-run homers and the Cubs were swept out of LA losing 9–4. Willson Contreras, Javier Báez, and Anthony Rizzo homered for the Cubs in the losing effort.
- **May 29** – Kyle Hendricks took the mound for the Cubs looking to avoid a four-game losing streak as the Cubs took on the last-place San Diego Padres in San Diego. However, Hendricks allowed a grand slam to Hunter Renfroe and the Cubs mustered only two runs despite being walked 10 times losing 5–2. The Cubs dropped to 25–25 on the season with their fourth straight loss.
- **May 30** – The Cubs lost their fifth straight game, losing to the Padres 6–2 despite Kyle Schwarber's eighth homer on the season. Eddie Butler gave up six runs in less than five innings as the Cubs dropped a game under .500 on the season.
- **May 31** – Jake Arrieta pitched well, only allowing one run in six innings, but Koji Uehara gave up the winning run in the bottom of the eighth as the Cubs losing streak moved to six games. The 2–1 loss ended a 12–16 month (with a dismal 2–10 record on the road) with the Cubs two games under .500 and 2.5 games out of first in the NL Central.

==== June ====
- **June 2** – The Cubs returned home and John Lackey pitched seven solid innings, giving up only two runs on four hits. Kris Bryant homered and Jason Heyward drove in two runs, including the game winner in the bottom of the eighth, as the Cubs ended their six-game losing streak, beating the Cardinals 3–2.
- **June 3** – Kyle Schwarber, batting .163 on the season and relegated to batting ninth, hit a grand slam in the seventh inning as the Cubs again came back to beat the Cardinals. Cardinals manager Mike Matheny chose to leave starter Mike Leake in the game to face Schwarber with the bases loaded and the Cubs trailing 3–1, but Schwarber crushed the first pitch he saw to left-center field for his first career grand slam. The 5–3 win moved the Cubs back to .500 on the season.
- **June 4** – Kyle Hendricks struggled for the Cubs, only lasting four innings while giving up four runs. However, Ian Happ homered twice for the Cubs and pinch-hitter Jon Jay drove in the winning run in the bottom of the eighth as the Cubs swept the Cardinals 7–6.
- **June 5** – Eddie Butler pitched 5 2/3 innings and Mike Montgomery pitched the remaining 3 1/33.1 innings for the save as the Cubs beat the Miami Marlins 3–1 at Wrigley Field. Kris Bryant's two-run homer in the first and Albert Almora Jr.'s solo shot in the fourth were enough as the Cubs won their fourth straight. The win moved the Cubs into a first place tie in the division with the Brewers.
- **June 6** – Jake Arrieta pitched six strong innings, only allowing one run, while the Cub offense exploded for 10 runs to win their fifth straight game. Anthony Rizzo's three-run homer in the fifth put the Cubs up for good and they added six runs in the seventh to rout the Marlins 10–2.
- **June 7** – John Lackey gave up five runs in six innings of work as the Cubs fell to the Marlins 6–5. Ian Happ and Kyle Schwarber homered for the Cubs who were unable to sweep the Marlins and failed to win their sixth in a row.
- **June 8** – With the Rockies in town, Jon Lester allowed a three-run homer to DJ LeMahieu which proved to be the difference in the game as the Cubs fell 4–1. Kris Bryant homered in the first inning, but the Cubs could not manage any further runs as they lost their second in a row. Addison Russell missed the game as he was under investigation by Major League Baseball after a domestic violation accusation was made against him on social media. It was unclear how much time he would miss.
- **June 9** – Rockies pitchers walked nine and hit two more batters, but the Cub offense was only able to manage three runs as the Cubs fell 5–3 for their third consecutive loss. Mike Montgomery starting for the injured Kyle Hendricks allowed two runs in four innings of work. Addison Russell was available, but did not play.
- **June 10** – Cubs starter Eddie Butler pitched five innings and gave up three runs against his old team, but the Cub offense continued to struggle, managing only one run. The Rockies added five runs in the top of the ninth to blow out the Cubs 9–1. Russell returned to the starting lineup and went 0–2.
- **June 11** – The Cubs jumped out in the first on the Rockies on a run-scoring double by Anthony Rizzo and a three-run homer by Ben Zobrist. However, it was homers by Addison Russell, Kyle Schwarber (pinch-hit), and Miguel Montero that broke a late tie to give the Cubs the 7–5 win and broke their four-game losing streak.
- **June 12** – The Cubs returned to the road to face the New York Mets while looking to end their eight-game road losing streak. John Lackey gave up three home runs as the Cubs offense struggled again, only scoring on an Addison Russell solo homer in the seventh. Mets' starter Jacob deGrom pitched a complete game to silence the Cubs' bats by inducing four double plays. The Cubs fell 6–1, their ninth straight road loss, and again fell under .500 on the season.
- **June 13** – The Cubs bats came alive in the second game of a three-game series to break the team's nine-game road losing streak. With Anthony Rizzo batting leadoff, the Cubs hit five home runs, but the biggest was a grand slam in the second inning off the bat of rookie Ian Happ which put the Cubs up 6–1. The Cubs routed the Mets 14–3 as Jon Lester earned his 150th career win.
- **June 14** – For the second consecutive game, Anthony Rizzo batted leadoff and homered in his first at-bat. Ian Happ followed with a homer as well, but the Cubs could not hold the early lead. Kyle Schwarber's fourth inning homer was still not enough as the Cubs bullpen allowed six runs, five of those in the eighth inning as the Cubs fell 9–4.
- **June 16** – After a day off, the Cubs traveled to Pittsburgh and Anthony Rizzo again led off. He homered again in his first at-bat, but it was overturned by the umpires which led to manager Joe Maddon being ejected for arguing the overturn. The Cubs still managed three runs in the first and took a lead into sixth, but again could not hold the lead. Trailing by one in the ninth, the Cubs exploded for six runs to beat the Pirates 9–5. For the game, both teams wore Negro league baseball throwback uniforms.
- **June 17** – In the second game of the series against the Pirates, Jake Arrieta struggled again, giving up four runs in 4 2/3 innings of work. Arrieta and Addison Russell homered for the Cubs, but the offense could not manage any more, losing 4–3.
- **June 18** – Looking to win their first road series since April 24–26, Rizzo led off for the fifth consecutive game and hit his 150th career homer in the seventh inning while going 3–5 in the game. John Lackey pitched well, allowing two hits in six innings, as the Cubs won 7–1.
- **June 19** – Returning to Wrigley for a three-game series against the Padres, Jon Lester pitched well, allowing two home runs in six innings of work. Rizzo led off again for the Cubs, reaching on a bunt single in the first. With the Cubs trailing by a run, Rizzo tripled in the sixth inning and was thrown at home trying to score on a Kris Bryant flyout. Rizzo collided with Padres catcher Austin Hedges, but Hedges held on to the ball to end the inning. Following the game, Rizzo's collision was questioned by Padres manager Andy Green as a dirty play. The Cubs would tie the game at two in the seventh with a Willson Contreras homer and would take the lead as Javier Báez scored following an error on an Albert Almora Jr. double giving the Cubs a 3–2 lead. Wade Davis pitched a stressful ninth, but was able to prevent the Padres from scoring the tying run as the Cubs won.
- **June 20** – Anthony Rizzo again homered to lead off the game again for the Cubs as Mike Montgomery and the Cub bullpen shut out the Padres 4–0. Ian Happ hit his ninth homer on the season as Addison Russell and Alberta Almora Jr. also drove in runs as the Cubs won their third straight to pull within half a game of the first place Brewers.
- **June 21** – The Cubs' winning streak ended with a 3–2 loss to the Padres. The Cubs managed only two hits, one a homer by Ian Happ, and gave up the winning run in the eighth on bases loaded walk by Koji Uehara. The Cubs fell back to one game over .500 on the season.
- **June 22** – Returning to the road to face the Miami Marlins, the Cub offense came alive as Kris Bryant, Addison Russell, and Willson Contrerars all homered in the Cubs 11–1 rout of the Marlins. Ian Happ and Russell each had four hits and two RBI and Jake Arrieta pitched well giving up one run in seven innings of work. The game marked the MLB debut of Mark Zagunis who was recalled due to Kyle Schwarber being sent to AAA Iowa.
- **June 23** – After the offensive output the previous day, the Cubs were shut out by the Marlins 2–0. John Lackey gave up just three hits and two runs in six innings, but still received the loss as the Cub offense could not push across a run.
- **June 24** – Jon Lester gave an up a three-run homer in the first to J. T. Realmuto, but shut down the Marlins for the rest of his seven-inning outing. Javier Báez led the way for the Cubs, driving in three runs, while Ian Happ and Addison Russell each had two hits and an RBI as the Cubs won 5–3.
- **June 25** – In the finale of the four-game series with the Marlins, the Cubs wasted Mike Montgomery's strong outing as they left 11 runners on base and allowed three unearned runs in the first inning. Addison Russell left the game in the fourth with pain in his throwing shoulder as the Cubs lost 4–2.
- **June 26** – The Cubs traveled to Washington to take on the Nationals in a four-game set. In game one, Eddie Butler and five relievers combined to shut out the Nationals for eight innings. Willson Contreras batted leadoff and homered in his first at-bat to give the difference in the game until late. The Cubs added four runs in the eighth and ninth innings to take a 5–1 lead into the bottom of the ninth. In the ninth, Héctor Rondón and Wade Davis gave up two runs apiece, but Davis struck out Ryan Zimmerman with the tying run on third and the winning run on second as the Cubs held on 5–4. Javier Báez made two great defensive plays in place of the injured Addison Russell.
- **June 27** – Jake Arrieta and Miguel Montero struggled mightily attempting to contain Washington's running game as the Nationals stole seven bases against the combo and Arrieta allowed six runs in four-plus innings of work. The Cub offense was silenced by Nationals ace Max Scherzer and the Cubs fell 6–1. Following the game, Montero complained that he received the blame for the steals when it was actually Arrieta's fault. The next day, Montero was designated for assignment.
- **June 28** – John Lackey gave up eight runs in 5 1/3 innings of work on three homers as the Cubs were blown out 8–4. Kris Bryant left the game in the fifth after he turned an ankle catching a popup. X-rays were negative, but Bryant was expected to miss some time. The injury added to a growing list for the Cubs as Ben Zobrist, Jason Heyward, and Kyle Hendricks were all on the DL already, while Addison Russell had not started for three games.
- **June 29** – In the finale of the four-game series with the Nationals, Jeimer Candelario's first career home run gave the Cubs the lead in the seventh, but the Cub bullpen surrendered it in the bottom half. Down to their last out in the top of the ninth, Tommy La Stella drove in a run and Jon Jay doubled in the tying and go-ahead runs. Wade Davis silenced the National bats for the save as the Cubs won 5–4. The Cubs played without Kris Bryant due to the ankle injury he suffered the day before.
- **June 30** – The Cubs road trip ended with a trip to Cincinnati. Cub bats were silenced however, only managing three hits against the Reds as Mike Montgomery gave up four runs in 6 2/3 innings as the Cubs lost 5–0. Kris Bryant missed his second straight game with an ankle injury.

==== July ====
- **July 1** – Kris Bryant returned to the lineup and Ben Zobrist was activated off the DL, but the Cubs again fell to the Reds. A three-run lead on Jon Jay's first homer of the season and a two-run home run by Willson Contreras quickly vanished as Eddie Butler gave up four runs in 3.2 innings as the Cubs lost their second straight, falling to a game under .500.
- **July 2** – Ben Zobrist returned to the starting lineup as Ian Happ homered twice and drove in four runs for the Cubs against the Reds. Jake Arrieta pitched seven innings while allowing only one hit as the Cubs avoided the sweep, winning 6–2.
- **July 2** – Major League Baseball announced the rosters for the All Star Game and, after having seven All Stars the prior season, only one Cub, Wade Davis, was named to the All Star team. Kris Byrant was one of five NL players with a chance to be voted into the game for the final spot on the roster.
- **July 4** – The Cubs returned home for a brief two-game series with the Tampa Bay Rays. Jon Lester gave up an early Cub lead and allowed six runs in five innings of work. Trailing 6–3 in the ninth, the Cubs scored twice off Rays closer Álex Colomé, but could not tie the game. The loss put the Cubs 3.5 games behind the Brewers in the division.
- **July 5** – Jon Jay hit a pinch-hit, three-run homer in the sixth inning to tie the game and the Cubs added four more runs in the seventh and eighth innings to beat the Rays 7–3. Ian Happ and Anthony Rizzo drove in two runs each as the Cubs returned to the .500 mark on the season.
- **July 6** – In a makeup game for an earlier rainout at Wrigley Field, Mike Montgomery gave up seven runs in 2 1/3 innings of work against the Milwaukee Brewers. Jon Jay pitched the ninth for the Cubs in attempt to save the bullpen as the Cubs were blown out 11–2. Kyle Schwarber went 0–4 in his return to the big league club as the Cubs dropped to 4.5 game behind the division-leading Brewers, marking the furthest out of first place the Cubs had been since October 3, 2015.
- **July 7** – Kris Bryant homered twice and drove in four runs while Anthony Rizzo also homered and drove in two runs as the Cubs beat the visiting Pirates 6–1.
- **July 8** – Despite back-to-back home runs by Ian Happ and Kyle Schwarber, Jake Arrieta allowed four runs in 5 2/3 innings as the Cubs lost to the Pirates 4–2.
- **July 9** – Jon Lester gave up 10 runs and did not make it out of the first inning as the Cubs were blown out 14–3 in their last game before the All-Star break. The loss put them two games under .500 and 5.5 games out of first.
- **July 14** – Returning from the All Star break, the Cubs visited the Baltimore Orioles and jumped to an early 8–0 lead. However, Mike Montgomery and the Cub bullpen could not hold the lead as the Orioles tied it in the eighth. Addison Russell gave the Cubs the lead again as he homered in the top of the ninth and Wade Davis blanked the Orioles to earn the save as the Cubs won 9–8.
- **July 15** – Jake Arrieta pitched well against his former team, giving up two runs in 6 2/3 innings of work. Jason Heyward drove in three runs with a bases-loaded triple while Addison Russell, Albert Almora Jr., and Anthony Rizzo homered. The Cubs held on to their lead this time, blowing out the Orioles 10–3.
- **July 16** – Newly acquired pitcher José Quintana struck out 12 while shutting out the Orioles in seven innings of work. The Cubs offense continued its hot hitting with homers by Kris Bryant and Anthony Rizzo as the Cubs blew out the Orioles 8–0, earning the sweep and their third straight win.
- **July 17** – Jon Lester took the mound as the Cubs traveled to Atlanta to face the Atlanta Braves. Lester, coming off the worst start of his career, pitched seven innings and allowed one run. Ben Zobrist drove in two runs and Anthony Rizzo homered to give the Cubs a 3–1 lead. A pinch hit double by Addison Russell pushed the lead to 4–1 heading to the ninth. However, Cubs closer Wade Davis gave up two runs in the ninth and faced a bases loaded situation before retiring the final Brave and giving the Cubs the 4–3 win.
- **July 18** – John Lackey returned from the DL to pitch five innings of one-run ball. Willson Contreras hit a three-run homer and Javier Báez homered as well as the Cubs beat the Braves 5–1. The win marked the Cubs fifth straight, tying their season high.
- **July 19** – Mike Montgomery allowed two hits and one run in six innings on the mound for the Cubs and also hit his first career homer. Javier Báez and Tommy La Stella also homered for the Cubs as they extended their winning streak to a season-high six games, beating the Brave 8–2. Kris Bryant left the game in the first inning after injuring his finger on a head-first slide at third base. It was revealed after the game that it was a sprained finger and Bryant was listed as day-to-day.
- **July 21** – After an off day, the Cubs returned home to Wrigley Field without Kris Bryant in the lineup. The Cubs took a 3–2 lead into the eighth looking for their seventh straight win. However, the Cardinals scored nine runs in the eighth before an out was recorded off Cub relievers Carl Edwards Jr., Héctor Rondón, and Justin Grimm. The Cubs' win streak ended as they lost 11–4.
- **July 22** – Kris Bryant returned to the lineup as Jon Lester and Adam Wainwright engaged in a pitchers' duel, each allowing no runs through their first seven innings of work. Lester gave up back-to-back solo home runs in the top of the eighth and Wainwright was chased from the game after allowing a run in the bottom half of the eighth. Kris Bryant tied it with a broken-bat single and Anthony Rizzo drove Bryant home on a bloop double to give the Cubs the 3–2 win.
- **July 23** – In the finale of the three-game series, José Quintana allowed three runs in six innings of work and Willson Contreras hit the game-winning two-run home run in the bottom of the sixth as the Cubs won 5–3. The win put the Cubs a season-high five games over .500 and moved them in to a tie for first place in the division.
- **July 24** – Kyle Hendricks returned from the DL as the Cubs welcomed the Chicago White Sox to Wrigley Field. Hendricks allowed one run in 4 1/3 innings and Justin Grimm gave up the game-winning homer in the sixth as the Cubs lost 3–1. The Cub offense went 0–10 with runners in scoring position as they left 12 runners on base.
- **July 25** – Willson Contreras drove in four runs, three on a first inning home run, as the Cubs pulled away from the White Sox to win 7–2. John Lackey pitched five innings and allowed two runs while hitting four batters. Kris Bryant was ejected for the first time in his career for arguing a strike call in the fourth inning.
- **July 26** – Jake Arrieta pitched 6 2/3 innings while allowing two runs on two hits and Anthony Rizzo drove in four runs as the Cubs beat the White Sox at Guaranteed Rate Field 8–3. The win moved the Cubs to 10–2 since the All-Star break and moved them into sole possession of first place, half a game ahead of the Brewers.
- **July 27** – Kyle Schwarber tripled and homered twice, driving in four runs as the Cubs beat the White Sox 6–3. Anthony Rizzo also homered for the Cubs as Jon Lester pitched seven strong innings while allowing two runs. The win moved the Cubs 1.5 games ahead of the Brewers in the Central Division as they improved their record to 11–2 since the All-Star break and moved to a season-high seven games over .500.
- **July 28** – Looking to extend their 1.5 game division lead, the Cubs traveled to Milwaukee, but could not get a big hit when they needed it. Javier Báez homered in the eighth, but it was not enough as the Cubs fell 2–1. José Quintana allowed two runs in six innings of work as the lead in the division moved to half a game.
- **July 29** – In game two of the series, Kyle Hendricks gave up one run in five innings of work, but the Cub offense struggled again. Kris Bryant drove in Jon Jay in the seventh to tie the game, but the game went to extra innings. In the 11th, Jason Heyward homered to give the Cubs the 2–1 win and extend the division lead to 1.5 games.
- **July 30** – Victor Caratini hit his first career home run to break 2–2 tie in the seventh and Kris Bryant added a homer as the Cubs beat the Brewers 4–2. John Lackey pitched six innings allowing only two runs. Anthony Rizzo sat out the game with back soreness and Caratini started in his place. The win moved the Cubs eight games over .500 and put the division lead at 2.5 games over the Brewers.

==== August ====
- **August 1** – Jon Lester hit his first career home run and struck out nine Arizona Diamondbacks to achieve 2,000 career strikeouts in his career. Anthony Rizzo homered twice and Javier Báez and Ian Happ each homered as the Cubs clobbered the Diamondbacks 16–4. The 16 runs were the most scored by the Cubs this year as they moved to 14–3 since the All Star break and moved nine games over .500.
- **August 2** – Jake Arrieta pitched seven innings and gave up only two runs, but the Cubs offense failed to muster a base runner after the third inning as the Diamondbacks beat the Cubs 3–0.
- **August 3** – The final game of the series with Arizona was delayed by three separate rain delays. José Quintana allowed six runs in five innings of work, giving up three home runs. Willson Contreras homered twice for the Cubs and drove in six runs as the Cubs retook the lead in the seventh. However, the D-backs retook the lead in the eighth off Carl Edwards Jr. and newly acquired Justin Wilson. The Cubs tied the game in the bottom half of the eighth and, following another rain delay, Wade Davis allowed back-to-back home runs in the ninth including Paul Goldschmidt's third of the game. The Cubs lost 10– 8 while losing their first series since the All Star break.
- **August 4** – With the first-place Washington Nationals in town, Kyle Hendricks pitched seven innings, but gave up three runs on two home runs by Daniel Murphy as the Cubs lost 4–2. Javier Báez homered for the Cubs as they dropped their third straight game.
- **August 5** – The Cubs ended their losing streak as Willson Contreras, starting in left field, homered again. Alex Avila hit his first homer as a Cubs and John Lackey allowed three runs in five innings of work as the Cubs beat the Nationals 7–4.
- **August 6** – Willson Contreras homered twice and Kyle Schwarber added a homer as the Cubs took a 4–1 lead against the Nationals. However, Carl Edwards Jr. continued his poor play allowing five runs in the eighth, the big blow coming on a Matt Wieters grand slam. The Cubs lost 9–4, their fourth loss in their last five games.
- **August 7** – The Cubs traveled to San Francisco to take on the Giants with Jake Arrieta on the mound. Arrieta allowed three runs, two earned, in 6 1/3 innings of work while Javier Báez hit a two-run inside-the-park home run to help give the Cubs an early lead. The bullpen held the lead for Arrieta with Wade Davis getting his 24th save on the season as the Cubs won 5–3.
- **August 8** – José Quintana struggled again for the Cubs, allowing four runs in six innings of work against the Giants. The Cub offense stumbled going 1–8 with runners in scoring position and managing only three runs. The bullpen allowed two runs as the Cubs lost for the fifth time in their prior seven games, 6–3. Koji Uehara left the game after facing two batters with an apparent injury.
- **August 9** – Kyle Hendricks pitched 4.2 innings while giving up one run as the Cub offense continued to struggle against the Giants. Albert Almora Jr. homered for the Cubs, but the bullpen gave up two runs as the Cubs lost 3–1. Willson Contreras left the game in the eighth inning with an apparent hamstring injury after attempting to reach on a ground ball out. The loss marked the Cubs' sixth loss in their last eight.
- **August 11** – After learning Willson Contreras would miss an estimated four to six weeks, John Lackey pitched 5.1 innings while allowing only two runs to win his fifth consecutive start. Kyle Schwarber and Alex Avila homered for the Cubs as they beat the Diamondbacks in Arizona 8–3.
- **August 12** – Jon Lester allowed four runs, all in the fifth inning as the Cubs lost 6–2 to the D-backs. The loss, combined with a Cardinal win, placed the Cubs in a virtual tie for first place in the division.
- **August 13** – Jake Arrieta pitched six innings and allowed only one run against Arizona. Kris Bryant continued his hot hitting, going three for four with a homer and reaching base in 13 of his 15 plate appearances in the series. Javier Báez and Ian Happ hit back-to-back homers in the eighth as the Cubs pulled away for a 7–2 win. With a Cardinal loss on the day, the Cubs moved a game up in the division.
- **August 14** – José Quintana allowed two runs in five innings of work as the Cubs returned to Wrigley Field to pound the Cincinnati Reds 15–5. Anthony Rizzo drove in five runs and hit back-to-back home runs with Kris Bryant as Jon Jay and Tommy La Stella each had three hits. Javier Báez also homered for the Cubs as they moved 1.5 games up on the idle St. Louis Cardinals in the division.
- **August 15** – The day after scoring 15 runs, the Cubs managed only one run, losing to the Reds 2–1. Kyle Hendricks pitched six-plus innings without allowing a run, but Pedro Strop and Justin Wilson each allowed a run as the Cubs remained 1.5 games ahead of the Cardinals.
- **August 16** – Anthony Rizzo hit a grand slam in the first inning as the Cubs jumped to an early lead against the Reds. John Lackey, who stole his first career base, allowed one run in six innings of work and left with a 6–1 lead. However, the Cub bullpen could not hold the lead, giving up five runs in the seventh and eighth innings to allow the Reds to tie the game at six. Javier Báez scored on a wild pitch with two out in the bottom of the ninth to secure the win for the Cubs.
- **August 17** – Jon Lester gave up nine runs in the second inning before leaving with an apparent injury as the Cubs trailed the Reds 9–0. The Cubs slugged six homers, two by Ian Happ, to tie the game at nine in the fifth inning, but the Cub bullpen again struggled. Justin Grimm surrendered two runs while Justin Wilson and Héctor Rondón each gave up a run as the Cubs fell 13–10. After the game, it was announced that Lester would likely go to the disabled list though the injury is not believed to be serious.
- **August 18** – As the Cubs welcomed the Toronto Blue Jays to Wrigley Field, Javier Báez drove in three runs, two on an eighth inning home run, and Anthony Rizzo drove in two. Jake Arrieta pitched 6.1 innings to get the win as the Cubs held off the Blue Jays 7–4.
- **August 19** – José Quintana pitched six strong innings against Toronto, giving up only two runs on four hits while Ian Happ homered and drove in two runs. Wade Davis converted his 26 consecutive save for the Cubs, tying the Cub record, as the Cubs won 4–3.
- **August 20** – With Kyle Hendricks on the mound, the Cubs jumped out to an early 3–0 lead on a bases-clearing double by Albert Almora Jr. in the third. However, the Blue Jays battled back to tie the game before Hendricks would leave after pitching six innings. The game remained tied into the 10th when the Cub bullpen continued its struggles as Koji Uehara, just off the disabled list, and Justin Wilson gave up two runs. However, in the bottom of the 10th, the Cubs loaded the bases on two dropped third strike reaches by Kyle Schwarber and Javier Báez. Ben Zobrist drove in one run while Alex Avila drove in two with the game-winning single giving the Cubs the sweep with a 6–5 win.
- **August 22** – Ben Zobrist did not start after having travel issues getting to the game, but did pinch hit and drive in three runs in two at-bats while Jason Heyward and Javier Báez each drove in two runs. The Cubs, trailing 3–0 and 6–3, came back to beat the Reds in Cincinnati 13–9. Kris Bryant was hit by a pitch in his left hand late in the game, however, x-rays were negative. Due to Bryant's injury and the Cubs bench being empty, Anthony Rizzo played third base in the ninth inning, becoming the first left-hander since 1997 to play third base.
- **August 23** – Kyle Schwarber hit a three-run home run and Tommy La Stella, playing for the injured Kris Bryant, hit a two-run shot as the Cubs blew out the Reds 9–3. Mike Montgomery, pitching in Jon Lester's spot in the starting rotation, went six innings and allowed no runs. The fifth straight win put the Cubs a season-high 11 games over .500 and a season-high 3.5 games up in the division.
- **August 24** – Ian Happ homered and Javier Báez had two hits and drove in a run as the Cubs took a 2–1 lead into the eighth. However, with two outs in the eighth, Pedro Strop allowed three runs as the Cubs lost to the Reds 4–2. The loss snapped the Cubs' five-game winning streak. Kris Bryant returned to the lineup after missing a game after getting hit with a pitch two days earlier.
- **August 25** – As the Cubs traveled to Philadelphia to take on the Phillies, José Quintana gave up six runs in the first two innings and the Cub offense struggled, managing only a solo home run by Kyle Schwarber. The Cubs lost their second straight game, falling 7–1.
- **August 26** – In the second game of the series, the Cubs pounded out six homers, two each by Anthony Rizzo and Tommy La Stella. Kyle Hendricks pitched seven strong innings allowing only two runs and got two hits in the seventh inning as the Cubs scored seven in that inning. Setting a season-high for runs scored, the Cubs pummeled the Phillies 17–2.
- **August 27** – The Cubs took an early 3–0 lead in the first inning of the series finale, but left the bases loaded in the inning. In the fifth inning with runners at first and second, the Phillies turned a triple play on a line drive caught by Rhys Hoskins as the Phillies were able to throw out the runners who had not tagged thinking the ball would drop. John Lackey, pitching well up to that point, then gave up five runs in the bottom half of the inning. As a result, the Cubs would fall 6–3.
- **August 28** – Returning home to face the Pirates, Mike Montgomery pitched seven strong innings, allowing only an eighth inning home run. The Cub offense scored three runs in the bottom of the seventh on a bases loaded ground out by Alex Avila that resulted in all three runners scoring on two throwing errors, the second and third errors in the inning by the Pirates. The Cubs went on to win 6–1, moving 2.5 games ahead of the idle Brewers in the division.
- **August 29** – In game two against the Pirates, Jake Arrieta pitched six innings while giving up no runs to earn the win. Ben Zobrist had two hits including a home run and Jason Heyward had two hits and an RBI as the Cubs won 4–1. Wade Davis pitched a scoreless ninth for a team-record 27th straight save. With the win and a Brewers loss, the Cubs extended their division lead to 3.5 games.
- **August 30** – Looking to complete the sweep of the Pirates, José Quintana struggled early for the Cubs, giving up two runs in the first inning. However, the Cubs offense made up for it, scoring 17 runs for the second time this season. Kyle Schwarber homered twice and drove in four runs while Ian Happ also homered and drove in four. Happ's homer gave the Cubs six players with 20 or more home runs on the season, a franchise record. The homer also gave the Cubs five players 25 or under with at least 20 home runs, a Major League record. Quintana also drove in a run and allowed only the two first inning runs to the Pirates as the Cubs completed the sweep, beating the Pirates 17–3. The win moved the Cubs a season-high 12 games over .500 as the Cubs' division lead remained at 3.5 games over the Brewers.
- **August 31** – Looking for their fourth straight win, Kyle Hendricks pitched 6 2/3 innings allowing only two runs while the bullpen shut out the visiting Atlanta Braves. Kris Bryant homered and drove in two runs and Jon Jay had four hits as the Cubs beat the Braves 6–2. The win moved the Cubs to a season-high 13 games over .500, but the division lead remained 3.5 games. Kris Bryant's homer, his 25th on the year, made him the first Cub in franchise history to hit 25 home runs in each of his first three seasons.

==== September ====
- **September 1** – In game two of the series, John Lackey allowed three baserunners in seven innings of work while Ian Happ and Kyle Schwarber each drove in a run. Wade Davis pitched a scoreless ninth, extending his club-record 28th consecutive save streak, for a 2–0 Cub shutout of the Braves. The Cubs division lead remained at 3.5 games.
- **September 2** – Looking for their sixth straight win, Jon Lester took the hill after being activated from the DL. Lester allowed four runs on eight hits in five innings of work. The Cub offense took an early 10–4 lead, but the bullpen struggled, giving up eight runs in the final three innings. The offense compensated, pounding out 12 hits and 14 runs as the Cubs beat the Braves 14–12. A loss by the Brewers extend the Cub division lead to 4.5 games.
- **September 3** – Looking to sweep the series against the Braves and finish the homestand 7–0, Mike Montgomery took the hill and gave up three runs in five innings. The Cub offense struggled after scoring 14 runs the day before and managed only one run on Ian Happ's second inning homer. Javier Báez left the game in the third inning after suffering from blurred vision after getting hit in the head on a slide. As a result, the Cubs fell 5–1. A win by the Brewers reduced the Cub division lead to 3.5 games.
- **September 4** – Traveling to Pittsburgh to take on the Pirates, Jake Arrieta, recently named NL August Pitcher of the Month, gave up three runs before leaving the game in the third inning with hamstring tightness. The Cub offense struggled for the second straight day, failing to score a run. The bullpen imploded late as the Cubs lost 12–0. A loss by the Brewers kept the Cub division lead at 3.5 games. A day after leaving the game due to blurred vision, Javier Báez was in the starting lineup originally, but was scratched with a thumb injury prior to the game.
- **September 5** – Javier Báez returned to the lineup as Kyle Hendricks took the mound for the Cubs. Ian Happ drove in two runs to give the Cubs an early 3–2 lead as Hendricks pitched well, allowing two runs in 6 2/3 innings of work. In the eighth, Carl Edwards Jr. walked the leadoff batter, gave up three hits and the lead as the Pirates came back to beat the Cubs 4–3. The Cub offense went 1–8 with runners in scoring position in the game. Despite the Cubs third loss in a row, their division lead remained at 3.5 games with another Brewers loss. It was announced that Jake Arrieta had a grade 1 hamstring strain and would miss at least one start.
- **September 6** – José Quintana pitched six scoreless innings and the bullpen completed the shutout of the Pirates. However, the game was still tied at 0–0 in the top of the ninth when Alex Avila tripled in the game-winning run. Wade Davis pitched a perfect ninth inning for his 29th save as the Cubs won 1–0. The win moved the Cubs 4.5 games ahead of the Brewers, who fell to third place in the division, and four games ahead of the second-place Cardinals.
- **September 7** – In his second start since coming off the disabled list, Jon Lester pitched six innings while allowing only one run following a 52-minute rain delay. The Cub offense scored a run in each of the first four innings and two in the fifth to take a 6–1 lead. Albert Almora Jr. hit a two-run home run in the seventh to further extend the Cub lead. Ian Happ had two of the Cubs seven doubles in the game as the Cubs beat the Pirates 8–2. The win extended the Cub division lead to five games over both the Cardinals and the Brewers and reduced the Cub magic number to 18.
- **September 8** – John Lackey pitched seven innings and allowed only two runs as the Cubs played their first Friday night game at Wrigley Field. However, the Brewer pitching staff was even better, shutting out the Cubs 2–0. The win moved the Brewers and Cardinals within four games of the Cubs in the division.
- **September 9** – Mike Montgomery gave up four runs in two-plus innings of work and the Cub bullpen was even worse giving up 11 additional runs. For the second straight day, the Cub offense was quiet, managing only two runs as the Cubs fell 15–2. The Brewers and Cardinals, with their win, moved within three games of the division lead.
- **September 10** – As the Cubs looked to avoid the sweep, Kyle Hendricks gave up three runs in six innings of work, but the Cub offense again struggled. The Brewers won 3–1 as the Cubs were swept and saw their division lead reduced to two games over the Brewers and Cardinals. Willson Contreras was activated from the DL before the game and struck out as a pinch-hitter. The Cubs scored three runs in the three-game series with the Brewers as the division race tightened up to two games over the Cardinals and Brewers.
- **September 12** – After an off day, the Cubs welcomed the New York Mets to Wrigley looking to end their three-game losing streak. José Quintana pitched seven strong innings allowing only two runs while Kris Bryant hit a three-run homer. Ian Happ also homered as Kyle Schwarber had three hits including his 26th homer of the season to lead the Cubs to an 8–3 win. Following another win by the Cardinals and Brewers, the Cubs division lead remained at two games over the Cardinals and 2.5 games over the Brewers who had lost on September 11.
- **September 13** – Albert Almora Jr. homered and drove in six runs in two at-bats late in the game and Javier Báez had four hits including a home run as the Cubs blew out the Mets 17–5. Jon Lester pitched six innings allowing two runs and Willson Contreras drove in three runs in the rout. A Cardinals loss and Brewers win moved the Brewers into second place in the division, still 2.5 games behind, while the Cardinals fell to three games out.
- **September 14** – In the final game of the series against the Mets, the Cubs started their minor league pitcher of the year, Jen-Ho Tseng. Tseng struggled, pitching three innings and giving up five runs. The Cub bullpen performed well however only allowing one additional run to score in the game. The offense continued its hot hitting as Jason Heyward homered and drove in four runs while Anthony Rizzo had three hits and drove in two. The Cubs blew out the Mets for the second straight game 14–6, completing the series sweep. A Cardinals win and Brewers off day left both teams three games behind the Cubs in the division race.
- **September 15** – John Lackey took the hill as the Cubs welcomed the Cardinals to Wrigley Field. Lackey gave up two runs in 4 2/3 innings of work before being ejected arguing a strike call with the home plate umpire. Willson Contreras was also ejected during the altercation, his mask hitting the umpire after he threw it to the ground in anger. Kris Bryant homered and drove in two runs while Ian Happ drove in two runs with a pinch-hit single as the Cubs scored seven runs in the sixth inning to pull away from the Cards, winning 8–2. The win was the Cubs fourth in a row and moved the Cardinals four games behind the Cubs.
- **September 16** – Kyle Hendricks pitched seven shutout innings before allowing a run in the eighth and exiting with a 3–1 lead. Addison Russell, who was activated from the DL prior to the game, hit his first career pinch-hit home run in the eighth as the Cubs beat the Cardinals 4–1. Albert Almora Jr. had three hits and drove in two as the Cubs magic number was reduced to 11. Prior to the game it was announced that Willson Contreras was fined and suspended two game for his ejection the day before while John Lackey was fined.
- **September 17** – As the Cubs looked to complete the sweep, José Quintana pitched 5 2/3 innings while allowing three runs. Ben Zobrist drove in two runs while Kyle Schwarber homered and Jason Heyward had the game-winning RBI single in the bottom of the seventh as the Cubs beat the Cardinals 4–3. The sweep moved the Cardinals six games behind the Cubs. With the Brewers remaining four games behind the Cubs, the Cubs magic number was reduced to 10 with 13 games remaining. Prior to the game it was announced that Willson Contreras had appealed his two-game suspension and had it reduced to one game; he served the suspension on September 17.
- **September 19** – After an off day, the Cubs traveled to Tampa to take on the Rays in a two-game set looking to notch a season-high with their seventh straight win. Kyle Schwarber homered and Javier Báez drove in a run to give the Cubs an early 2–0 lead. Mike Montgomery pitched 5.1 innings of no-hit ball before surrendering a solo home run. Montgomery finished with six innings of one-hit ball while the bullpen shut down the Rays as well combing with Montgomery to allow only the one hit. Wade Davis pitched his first three up, three down, three strikeout inning for his 32nd consecutive save, extending his Cub record. The Cubs magic number was reduced to nine as the Brewers (who had won on the Cub off day) remained 3.5 games out of first. The win moved the Cubs to a season-high 18 games over .500 as they won their season-high seventh straight game.
- **September 20** – Jon Lester pitched 4.1 innings while allowing seven runs as the Cubs' win streak ended at seven as the Cubs lost to the Rays 8–1. As Lester continued to struggle, the Cubs offense struggled, managing only a Jon Jay RBI single in the loss. However, the Brewers lost as well, reducing the Cubs magic number to eight as the Cubs headed to Milwaukee for a four-game series.
- **September 21** – Jake Arrieta returned from his absence due to his injured hamstring to pitch as the Cubs traveled to Milwaukee for a four-game set against the Brewers. Arrieta pitched well, allowing one run in five innings of work and left the game with a 2–1 lead on the strength of a Kyle Schwarber home run and Anthony Rizzo run-scoring single. The Cub bullpen could not hold the lead as Pedro Strop and Justin Wilson surrendered a run each leaving the Cubs trailing 3–2 in the top of the ninth. Following an Ian Happ infield single, Javier Báez singled with two strikes and two outs to score Happ and tie the game. Wade Davis escaped a bases loaded one-out situation in the bottom of the ninth to move the game to extra innings and Kris Bryant slammed a two-run home run to center field in the top of the 10th to give the Cubs a 5–3 victory. The win reduced the Cub magic number to six as the Brewers moved to 4.5 games out of first while the Cardinals remained five games out.
- **September 22** – John Lackey lasted only four innings while giving up three runs to the Brewers, but trailed only 3–2 upon his departure. Ben Zobrist drove in two runs in the top of the fifth with a run-scoring single to give the Cubs a 4–2 lead before the Cub bullpen surrendered the lead in the bottom half of the inning. Neither team could manage another run until the top of the 10th when pinch-hitter Tommy La Stella took a bases-loaded walk to give the Cubs a 5–4 lead. Carl Edwards Jr. pitched a scoreless 10th, his second inning of work in the game, as the Cubs pulled out a second consecutive extra inning win. The win moved the Brewers into third place 5.5 games out as the Cardinals remained five games out. The Cubs magic number moved to five.
- **September 23** – Kyle Hendricks pitched six innings allowing eight hits, but only one run and left with the game tied 1–1. The Cubs took the lead in the top of the eighth on Ian Happ double and Kris Bryant sacrifice fly. Wade Davis took the mound in the bottom of the ninth looking to extend his 32 consecutive save streak, but gave up a home run to the first batter, Orlando Arcia, marking his first blown save of the year. In the top of the 10th, Jon Jay drove in Ian Happ to again give the Cubs the lead. Davis returned for the 10th, but, following a one-out double by Ryan Braun, surrendered a walk-off two-run home run to Travis Shaw as the Cubs fell 4–3. The loss reduced the division lead over the Brewers to 4.5 games, but a Cardinals loss moved the Cubs magic number to four.
- **September 24** – In the finale of the four-game series against the Brewers, José Quintana pitched a complete game, allowing no runs and three hits. Ben Zobrist homered, driving in two runs, and Anthony Rizzo also drove in two runs as the Cubs won easily 5–0. The win moved the Brewers 5.5 games out of first, while another Cardinals loss left them six games out. The Cubs magic number was reduced to two as the Cubs headed to St. Louis for a four-game series.
- **September 25** – Jon Lester pitched six innings while allowing only one run as the Cubs put up eight runs in the first three innings to blow out the Cardinals 10–2. Kris Bryant had three hits and homered while Javier Baez hit a three-run homer as the Cubs eliminated the Cardinals from division contention. The win also clinched at least a division tie for the Cubs as their magic number was reduced to one.
- **September 26** – Jason Heyward hit a three-run homer to bring the Cubs close and Ben Zobrist also homered. However, Jake Arrieta struggled, giving up five runs in just three innings of work as the Cubs could not come from behind against the Cardinals. The 8–7 loss combined with a Brewers win, left the Cubs' magic number at one.
- **September 27** – For the second consecutive day, the Cubs had a chance to clinch the division with a win or a Brewers loss. John Lackey pitched six effective innings only allowing one run, but still trailed 1–0 heading into the top of the seventh. A three-run home run by Addison Russell in the seventh gave the Cubs the lead and run-scoring doubles by Jason Heyward and Tommy La Stella moved the lead to 5–1. The Cub bullpen shut down the Cardinals for the last three innings as the Cubs won 5–1. The win clinched the NL Central division title for the Cubs marking the first time that they had won back-to-back division titles since 2007 and 2008 and the first time that they have reached the postseason in three straight years since 1906, 1907, and 1908.
- **September 28** – Following the division-clinching win, Kyle Hendricks pitched five shutout innings and Ian Happ homered to give the Cubs the early lead. The Cardinals tied it in the sixth and the game went to extra innings tied at one. In the 11th, Taylor Davis doubled in Kyle Schwarber to give the Cubs the lead. Jen-Ho Tseng pitched three scoreless innings for the win as Leonys Martín robbed a would-be game-tying home run by Paul DeJong for the final out. The 2–1 Cubs' win eliminated the Cardinals from postseason contention.
- **September 29** – Returning home for the final series of the regular season, José Quintana gave up four runs in 4 2/3 innings of work as the Cubs trailed 4–2 heading into the eighth inning. However, Ian Happ homered for the second consecutive game, driving in three, to give the Cubs the win over the Reds 5–4.
- **September 30** – In his final start of the season, Jon Lester pitched five shutout innings to earn the win. Kyle Schwarber hit his 30th home run of the season and drove in four runs as the Cubs routed the Reds 9–0.

==== October ====
- **October 1** – In the final game of the regular season, John Lackey worked out of the bullpen in anticipation of a similar role in the postseason, but gave up one run in one inning. The Cubs only managed one run as they fell to the Reds 3–1. The Cubs had the second-best record in the majors since the All-Star game at 50–25.

=== Transactions ===
==== April ====
April 14	LHP Brian Duensing activated off of the 10-day disabled list, RHP Carl Edwards Jr. placed on the bereavement list.
April 17	RHP Carl Edwards Jr. reinstated, INF Tommy La Stella to bereavement list.
April 22	INF Tommy La Stella activated from bereavement list and optioned to AAA Iowa.

==== May ====
May 5	RHP Justin Grimm optioned to AAA Iowa, RHP Félix Peña recalled from Iowa.
May 6	OF Matt Szczur designated for assignment, LHP Rob Zastryzny recalled from Iowa.
May 7	LHP Brett Anderson placed on 10-day DL (back). LHP Rob Zastryzny sent to Iowa. RHP Justin Grimm and IF Tommy La Stella recalled from Iowa.
May 8	OF Jason Heyward placed on 10-day DL (sprained finger), RHP Dylan Floro's contract purchased from AAA Iowa.
May 8	OF Matt Szcur traded to the San Diego Padres for minor league RHP Justin Hancock.
May 9	3B Jeimer Candelario recalled from AAA Iowa for doubleheader extra roster spot.
May 10	RHP Dylan Floro optioned to AAA Iowa.
May 11	RHP Justin Grimm sent to AAA Iowa, RHP Eddie Butler recalled.
May 13	IF Ian Happ recalled from AAA Iowa, RHP Félix Peña sent down.
May 17	3B Jeimer Candelario sent to AAA Iowa, RHP Pierce Johnson recalled.
May 21	OF Jason Heyward activated from DL. RHP Pierce Johnson and IF Tommy La Stella optioned to AAA Iowa. RHP Dylan Floro recalled from Iowa.
May 22	RHP Dylan Floro sent to AAA Iowa. Cubs select contract of LHP Zac Rosscup, RHP Jake Buchanan designated for assignment to make room for Rosscup on the 40 man roster.
May 23	LHP Zac Rosscup sent to AAA Iowa, RHP Félix Peña recalled.
May 25	RHP Jake Buchanan claimed off waivers by Cincinnati Reds.
May 29	RHP Justin Grimm recalled from AAA Iowa, RHP Félix Peña sent down.

==== June ====
June 5	RHP Wade Davis placed on paternity list, RHP Dylan Floro recalled.
June 6	RHP Wade Davis activated from paternity list, RHP Dylan Floro optioned to AAA Iowa.
June 8	RHP Kyle Hendricks placed on 10-day DL retroactive to June 5 (tendinitis in his right hand). RHP Seth Frankoff recalled from AAA Iowa. LHP Brett Anderson transferred to 60-day DL.
June 10	RHP Félix Peña recalled from AAA Iowa. Seth Frankoff optioned to AAA Iowa.
June 16	IF Ben Zobrist placed on 10-day DL (wrist) retroactive to June 13, IF Tommy La Stella recalled.
June 22	OF Kyle Schwarber sent to AAA Iowa. OF Jason Heyward placed on 10-day disabled list. RHP Dylan Floro and OF Mark Zagunis recalled from AAA Iowa. LHP Zac Rosscup was designated for assignment to make room for Zagunis on the 40-man roster.
June 26	IF Jeimer Candelario recalled from AAA Iowa, RHP Dylan Floro optioned to Iowa.
June 27	LHP Zac Rosscup traded to Colorado for RHP Matt Carasiti.
June 28	C Miguel Montero designated for assignment. C Víctor Caratini recalled from AAA Iowa.

==== July ====
July 1	IF Ben Zobrist activated from DL, OF Mark Zagunis optioned to Iowa.
July 3	C Miguel Montero traded to Toronto Blue Jays for a player to be named or cash considerations. OF Jason Heyward activated from DL, IF Jeimer Candelario optioned to Iowa. LHP Jack Leathersich recalled from Iowa, RHP Félix Peña sent down.
July 6	OF Kyle Schwarber recalled from Iowa, RHP John Lackey placed on 10-day DL (plantar faciitis).
July 13	Cubs trade minor league prospects OF Eloy Jiménez, RHP, Dylan Cease, IF Matt Rose, and RHP Bryant Flete to the Chicago White Sox for LHP José Quintana.
July 14	RHP Dylan Floro sent to AAA Iowa to make room for LHP José Quintana on roster.
July 18	RHP Eddie Butler optioned to AAA Iowa, RHP John Lackey activated from DL.
July 22	IF Tommy La Stella optioned to AAA Iowa, RHP Félix Peña recalled.
July 24	RHP Kyle Hendricks activated from DL, RHP Félix Peña optioned to AAA Iowa.
July 26	LHP Brett Anderson activated from 60-day DL and designated for assignment.
July 30	Cubs trade IF Jeimer Candelario, SS prospect Isaac Paredes, and a player to be named or cash considerations to the Detroit Tigers for LHP Justin Wilson and C Alex Avila.
July 31	RHP Dylan Floro designated for assignment. C Victor Caratini and RHP Jusitn Grimm optioned to AAA Iowa.

==== August ====
August 4	Addison Russell placed on 10-day DL (foot), LHP Rob Zastryzny recalled from Iowa.
August 6	IF Tommy La Stella recalled from AAA Iowa, LHP Rob Zastryzny optioned to AAA.
August 9	RHP Koji Uehara placed on 10-day DL (neck), RHP Justin Grimm recalled from AAA.
August 11	C Willson Contreras placed on 10-day DL (hamstring), C Victor Caratini recalled from AAA Iowa.
August 18	LHP Jon Lester (lat strain, shoulder fatigue) and RHP Justin Grimm (finger) placed on 10-day DL. RHP Félix Peña and LHP Rob Zastryzny recalled from Iowa.
August 19	C René Rivera claimed off waivers from New York Mets.
August 20	C René Rivera added to active roster, C Victor Caratini optioned to AAA Iowa.
August 20	RHP Koji Uehara activated from DL, LHP Rob Zastryzny optioned to AAA.
August 23	Milwaukee Brewers claim RHP Aaron Brooks off waivers from Cubs.
August 31	OF Leonys Martin acquired from Seattle Mariners for a player to be named later or cash considerations.

==== September ====
September 1	RHP Justin Grimm activated from DL. C Victor Caratini recalled from AAA Iowa. RHP Dillon Maples and IF Mike Freeman's contracts selected from AAA Iowa. RHP José Rosario and RHP Seth Frankoff designated for assignment.
September 2	LHP Jon Lester activated from DL, LHP Jake Leathersich designated for assignment. OF Leonys Martin's contract selected from AAA Iowa.
September 3	LHP Rob Zastryzny recalled from AAA Iowa.
September 4	Seattle Mariners claim RHP Seth Frankoff and OF Jacob Hannemann off waivers from Cubs. Pittsburgh Pirates claimed LHP Jack Leathersich off waivers from Cubs. C Taylor Davis' contract selected by Cubs and Davis was added to the active roster.
September 10	Cubs activated C Willson Contreras from disabled list.
September 13	Cubs selected contract of RHP Jen-Ho Tseng, designated RHP Pierce Johnson for assignment.
September 16	SS Addison Russell activated from DL.

=== Regular season roster ===
(Contains all players who played in a game for the Cubs during the 2017 season.)

2017 Chicago Cubs
**Roster**
**Pitchers**: 49 Jake Arrieta; 37 Brett Anderson; 33 Eddie Butler; 71 Wade Davis; 32 Brian Duensing; 6 Carl Edwards Jr.; 15 Dylan Floro; 43 Seth Frankoff; 52 Justin Grimm; 28 Kyle Hendricks; 48 Pierce Johnson; 41 John Lackey; 51 Jack Leathersich; 34 Jon Lester; 36 Dillon Maples; 38 Mike Montgomery; 60 Félix Peña; 62 José Quintana; 56 Héctor Rondón; 59 Zac Rosscup; 46 Pedro Strop; 39 Jen-Ho Tseng; 19 Koji Uehara; 37 Justin Wilson; 29 Rob Zastryzny	**Catchers**: 13 Alex Avila; 20 Víctor Caratini; 40 Willson Contreras; 47 Miguel Montero; 7 René Rivera; **Infielders**: 9 Javier Báez; 17 Kris Bryant; 7 Jeimer Candelario; 43 Taylor Davis; 15 Mike Freeman; 2 Tommy La Stella; 44 Anthony Rizzo; 27 Addison Russell; 18 Ben Zobrist	**Outfielders**: 5 Albert Almora; 8 Ian Happ; 22 Jason Heyward; 30 Jon Jay; 24 Leonys Martín; 12 Kyle Schwarber; 20 Matt Szczur; 21 Mark Zagunis	**Manager**: 70 Joe Maddon; **Coaches**: 64 Henry Blanco (quality assurance); 58 Mike Borzello (catching); 25 Chris Bosio (pitching); -- Doug Dascenzo (outfield); 77 Eric Hinske (assistant hitting); 16 Brandon Hyde (first base); 1 Gary Jones (third base); 11 John Mallee (hitting); 4 Dave Martinez (bench); 95 Chad Noble (bullpen catcher); 35 Lester Strode (bullpen)

== Postseason ==
=== Game log ===
2017 postseason game log: 4–6 (Home: 2–3; Away: 2–3)
National League Division Series: 3–2 (Home: 1–1; Away: 2–1)

#	Date	Opponent	Score	Win	Loss	Save	Attendance	Series
1	October 6	@ Nationals	3–0	Hendricks (1–0)	Strasburg (0–1)	Davis (1)	43,898	1–0
2	October 7	@ Nationals	3–6	Pérez (1–0)	Edwards Jr. (0–1)	Doolittle (1)	43,860	1–1
3	October 9	Nationals	2–1	Edwards Jr. (1–1)	Kintzler (0–1)	Davis (2)	42,445	2–1
–	October 10	Nationals	Postponed (rain); Rescheduled for October 11.					
4	October 11	Nationals	0–5	Strasburg (1–1)	Arrieta (0–1)	—	42,264	2–2
5	October 12	@ Nationals	9–8	Duensing (1–0)	Scherzer (0–1)	Davis (3)	43,849	3–2

National League Championship Series: 1–4 (Home: 1–2; Away: 0–2)

#	Date	Opponent	Score	Win	Loss	Save	Attendance	Series
1	October 14	@ Dodgers	2–5	Maeda (1–0)	Rondón (0–1)	Jansen (1)	54,289	0–1
2	October 15	@ Dodgers	1–4	Jansen (1–0)	Duensing (1–1)	—	54,479	0–2
3	October 17	Dodgers	1–6	Darvish (1–0)	Hendricks (1–1)	—	41,871	0–3
4	October 18	Dodgers	3–2	Arrieta (1–0)	Wood (0–1)	Davis (1)	42,195	1–3
5	October 19	Dodgers	1–11	Kershaw (1–0)	Quintana (0–1)	—	42,735	1–4

=== Division Series ===
On October 4, 2017, the Cubs announced that Kyle Hendricks would start Game 1 of the Division Series while Jon Lester would start Game 2. Joe Maddon also announced that José Quintana would start Game 3 and Jake Arrieta Game 4 (if necessary). On October 5, Nationals manager Dusty Baker announced that Stephen Strasburg would start Game 1 for the Nationals, but did not state who would start any other games. The Nationals later announced Gio González would start Game 2 while Max Scherzer would start Game 3. On October 8, Baker announced that Tanner Roark would start Game 4 for the Nationals.

==== Game 1 ====
Friday, October 6, 2017 6:31 pm CDT at Nationals Park in Washington, D.C.
Team	1	2	3	4	5	6	7	8	9	R	H	E
Chicago	0	0	0	0	0	2	0	1	0	3	5	1
Washington	0	0	0	0	0	0	0	0	0	0	2	1
WP: Kyle Hendricks (1–0) LP: Stephen Strasburg (0–1) Sv: Wade Davis (1); Home runs: CHI: None; WAS: None; Attendance: 43,898

In Game 1 of the Division series, the Cubs faced the Nationals' Stephen Strasburg and were held hitless for five innings. Kyle Hendricks also shut out the Nationals, pitching seven shutout innings while allowing only two hits. In the sixth, Javier Báez reached on an error by Nationals' third basemen Anthony Rendon. Hendricks bunted him to second and, following a flyout by Ben Zobrist, Kris Bryant drove in Baez with a single to right to give the Cubs the 1–0 lead. Bryant, who advanced to second on the throw, was then driven in on a single by Anthony Rizzo to extend the lead to 2–0. The Cubs added to the lead on a Rizzo double following a Jon Jay double to push the lead to 3–0. Carl Edwards Jr. pitched a perfect eighth and Wade Davis slammed the door on the Nationals in the ninth as the Cubs took a 1–0 lead in the series.

==== Game 2 ====
Saturday, October 7, 2017 4:38 pm CDT at Nationals Park in Washington, D.C.
Team	1	2	3	4	5	6	7	8	9	R	H	E
Chicago	0	1	0	2	0	0	0	0	0	3	6	0
Washington	1	0	0	0	0	0	0	5	X	6	6	0
WP: Óliver Pérez (1–0) LP: Carl Edwards Jr. (0–1) Sv: Sean Doolittle (1); Home runs: CHI: Wilson Contreras (1), Anthony Rizzo (1); WAS: Anthony Rendon (1), Bryce Harper (1), Ryan Zimmerman (1); Attendance: 43,860

Looking to take a 2–0 lead in the series, the Cubs sent Jon Lester to the mound while the Nationals went with Gio González. Lester gave up a first inning home run to Anthony Rendon, but Willson Contreras quickly answered with a homer in the top of the second to tie the game at one. Anthony Rizzo gave the Cubs a 3–1 lead in the fourth when he homered to deep right with Kris Bryant at second. Lester cruised through the Nationals until the fifth inning with two outs and a runner on when he walked back-to-back batters to load the bases. However, Lester struck out Trea Turner to end the threat and would pitch a scoreless sixth. Pedro Strop pitched a scoreless seventh in relief and the Cubs looked to be in command as Carl Edwards Jr. took the hill in the eighth. Edwards gave up a pinch hit to Adam Lind but struck out Turner before Bryce Harper came to the plate. Harper crushed a hanging slider into the right field seats to tie the game at three. Edwards then walked Rendon and gave up a single to Daniel Murphy before being replaced by Mike Montgomery to face Ryan Zimmerman. Zimmerman homered just over the wall in left to give the Nationals a 6–3 lead heading into the ninth. In the ninth, Addison Russell singled with one out, but was wiped out on a game-ending double play grounder by Ben Zobrist. The loss moved the series to one game each as the series headed to Chicago for games three and four.

==== Game 3 ====
Monday, October 9, 2017 3:08 pm CDT at Wrigley Field in Chicago, Illinois
Team	1	2	3	4	5	6	7	8	9	R	H	E
Washington	0	0	0	0	0	1	0	0	0	1	3	1
Chicago	0	0	0	0	0	0	1	1	X	2	4	4
WP: Carl Edwards Jr. (1–1) LP: Brandon Kintzler (0–1) Sv: Wade Davis (2); Home runs: WAS: none CHI: none Attendance: 42,445

As the series shifted to Wrigley Field, the Nationals sent their ace Max Scherzer to the mound while the Cubs countered with José Quintana. Quintana pitched well, but was not helped by his defense. Ben Zobrist committed an error on a grounder with a runner on in the third inning to put runners at the corners with two out. However, Quintana retired the next batter to escape the inning. In the sixth, with two outs, Kyle Schwarber dropped an easy fly ball that would have ended the inning and then kicked the ball allowing Daniel Murphy to reach third. Joe Maddon then lifted Quintana in favor of Pedro Strop. Strop, however, gave up a double to Ryan Zimmerman to give the Nationals the 1–0 lead. Meanwhile, Scherzer held the Cubs hitless until the seventh inning when Zobrist doubled with one out. Nationals manager Dusty Baker brought in Sammy Solis to pitch to Albert Almora Jr. who was pinch hitting for Schwarber. With a full count, Almora singled to left center to drive in Zobrist and tie the game. Jason Heyward followed with single, but was doubled off of first on Addison Russell's flyout to end the inning. Carl Edwards Jr., after struggling in Game 2, started the eighth, struck out Bryce Harper, and then retired the side. In the bottom of the eighth, Tommy La Stella pinch hit for Edwards and drew a walk from reliever Brandon Kintzler. He was then pinch run for by Leonys Martín as Jon Jay sacrificed Martín to second. Following a strikeout by Bryant, Baker brought in Óliver Pérez to face Anthony Rizzo. Rizzo, who said after the game that he expected to be walked with first base open and two outs, blooped a single to short left center that fell between three Nationals and scored Martín to give the Cubs the 2–1 lead. Wade Davis pitched a perfect ninth to close out the win and give the Cubs a 2–1 lead in the series.

==== Game 4 ====
October 11, 2017 4:08 pm EDT at Wrigley Field in Chicago, Illinois
Team	1	2	3	4	5	6	7	8	9	R	H	E
Washington	0	0	1	0	0	0	0	4	0	5	5	1
Chicago	0	0	0	0	0	0	0	0	0	0	3	2
WP: Stephen Strasburg (1–1) LP: Jake Arrieta (0–1); Home runs: WAS: Michael Taylor (1); CHC: None; Attendance: 42,264

Game 4, originally scheduled to be played on October 10, was postponed to October 11 due to rain. The Cubs announced that Jake Arrieta would still pitch Game 4 despite the extra day off. Reports stated that the Nationals wanted Stephen Strasburg to pitch the game as he would be on normal rest. However, Strasburg declined stating that he was under the weather. However, hours before Game 4 was to begin, the Nationals announced that Strasburg would start. Jake Arrieta started for the Cubs and pitched well allowing only an unearned run on an error by Addison Russell in the third inning. Strasburg struck out 12 Cubs in his seven innings of work while not allowing a run. Arrieta left the game after four innings of work having thrown 90 pitches and trailing 1–0. Jon Lester relieved Arrieta and pitched 3.2 innings in relief, leaving in the eighth with a runner on first and two outs. Carl Edwards Jr. made his fourth relief appearance in the series and walked the next two Nationals he faced, loading the bases. Wade Davis then replaced Edwards and gave up a grand slam to Michael Taylor to stretch the Nationals lead to 5–0. The Cubs could manage nothing further and fell 5–0. The loss set the stage for a deciding Game 5 in Washington the next day with the series tied at two.

==== Game 5 ====
October 12, 2017 8:08 pm EDT at Nationals Park in Washington, D.C.
Team	1	2	3	4	5	6	7	8	9	R	H	E
Chicago	1	0	2	0	4	1	1	0	0	9	9	0
Washington	0	4	0	0	0	2	1	1	0	8	14	2
WP: Brian Duensing (1–0) LP: Max Scherzer (0–1) Sv: Wade Davis (3); Home runs: CHC: none WAS: Daniel Murphy (1), Michael Taylor (2); Attendance: 43,849

As the teams returned to Washington for the deciding Game 5, the Cubs sent Game 1 starter Kyle Hendricks to the mound while the Nationals started Gio González. The Cubs started the scoring in the first as Jon Jay led off the game with a double and scored on an Anthony Rizzo groundout. The Cubs then loaded the bases with two outs in the first, but Jason Heyward grounded out to end the threat. In the second inning, Daniel Murphy homered and Michael Turner hit a three-run homer to put the Nationals up 4–1. González continued to struggle in the third as Kris Bryant doubled and Willson Contreras and Albert Almora Jr. walked to the load the bases. Addison Russell drove in his first run of the night on a groundout and Contreras scored on a wild pitch to narrow the lead to 4–3. Heyward would again end the threat by striking out. The Nationals went to the pen in the fourth and in the fifth brought in starter Max Scherzer. After Bryant and Rizzo were retired by Scherzer, seven straight Cubs batters reached base, scoring four runs, two on a double by Russell, to give the Cubs the lead 7–4. The Cubs added to their lead in the sixth as Russell doubled in Ben Zobrist on a fly ball that was misplayed by Jayson Werth. The Cubs went to the bullpen in the bottom of the fifth and in the sixth the Nationals added two runs on a wild pitch by Mike Montgomery which scored a run and a double by Murphy. Leading 8–6 in the seventh, the Cubs added another run when Kyle Schwarber pinch hit and doubled, scoring on a groundout by Kris Bryant. The Nationals answered in the seventh as the Cubs used Carl Edwards Jr. and José Quintana to get two outs, but a sacrifice fly by Bryce Harper narrowed the lead to 9–7. Wade Davis came in for the Cubs to get a seven-out save and struck out Ryan Zimmerman to end the inning. In the eighth, Davis gave up a run-scoring single by Taylor to bring the lead to one at 9–8. Following a single by José Lobatón to put runners on first and second with two outs, Contreras picked Lobatón off of first to end the inning. In the ninth, Davis set the Nationals down in order, striking out Werth and Harper to end the game and win the series for the Cubs.

==== Composite line score ====
2017 NLDS (3–2): Chicago Cubs defeated Washington Nationals

Team	1	2	3	4	5	6	7	8	9	R	H	E
Chicago Cubs	1	1	2	2	4	3	2	2	0	17	27	7
Washington Nationals	1	4	1	0	0	3	1	10	0	20	30	5
Total attendance: 216,316 Average attendance: 43,263

=== Championship Series ===
==== Game 1 ====
October 14, 2017 7:08 pm CDT at Dodger Stadium in Los Angeles, California
Team	1	2	3	4	5	6	7	8	9	R	H	E
Chicago	0	0	0	2	0	0	0	0	0	2	4	0
Los Angeles	0	0	0	0	2	1	2	0	X	5	5	0
WP: Kenta Maeda (2–0) LP: Héctor Rondón (0–1) Sv: Kenley Jansen (3); Home runs: CHC: Albert Almora Jr. (1); LAD: Chris Taylor (1), Yasiel Puig (1); Attendance: 54,289

As the Cubs traveled to Los Angeles for Game 1 of the Championship Series, their flight was forced to make an emergency landing in Albuquerque, New Mexico as José Quintana's wife suffered a medical issue. The Cubs were on the ground for five hours before continuing on to Los Angeles, Quintana joined the team later that day. Quintana was named the starting pitcher despite this issue and pitched well for the Cubs. Albert Almora Jr. gave the Cubs the lead in the fourth on a two-run home run off Dodger starter Clayton Kershaw. The Dodgers answered in the fifth on an RBI double by Yasiel Puig and a sacrifice fly by Charlie Culberson. Quintana left after five innings and Héctor Rondón, who had replaced Justin Wilson on the Championship Series roster, gave up a home run to Chris Taylor in the sixth to give the Dodgers a 3–2 lead. Puig homered off Mike Montgomery in the seventh and Justin Turner drove in a run to stretch the Dodger lead to 5–2. The Cubs managed nothing against the Dodger bullpen which relieved Kershaw after five innings as the Cubs fell behind in the series 1–0.

==== Game 2 ====
October 15, 2017 4:38 pm (PDT) at Dodger Stadium in Los Angeles, California
Team	1	2	3	4	5	6	7	8	9	R	H	E
Chicago	0	0	0	0	1	0	0	0	0	1	3	0
Los Angeles	0	0	0	0	1	0	0	0	3	4	5	0
WP: Kenley Jansen (1–0) LP: Brian Duensing (1–1); Home runs: CHC: Addison Russell (1); LAD: Justin Turner (1); Attendance: 54,479

In Game 2, the Cubs sent Jon Lester to the mound on short rest after pitching 3.2 innings in relief in Game 4 of the NLDS. Addison Russell homered off Rich Hill in the fifth to give the Cubs a 1–0 lead, but the Dodger tied it in the bottom half of the fifth on a Culberson double and a Justin Turner single. As the game went to the bullpens after five innings, the Cubs were again shut out, managing only a hit-by-pitch of Anthony Rizzo. In the bottom of the ninth, Yasiel Puig led off with a walk off of Brian Duensing. A sacrifice bunt moved him to second, but Duensing struck out Kyle Farmer for the second out. Joe Maddon then lifted Duensing to bring in usual starting pitcher John Lackey. Lackey, who had pitched 1.2 innings in relief the day before, had never pitched on back-to-back days in his career. He walked the first batter he faced and then gave up a three-run, game-winning home run to Turner to give the Dodgers the 4–1 win and a 2–0 lead in the series.

==== Game 3 ====
October 17, 2017 8:08 pm (CDT) at Wrigley Field in Chicago, Illinois
Team	1	2	3	4	5	6	7	8	9	R	H	E
Los Angeles	0	1	1	0	1	1	0	2	0	6	9	0
Chicago	1	0	0	0	0	0	0	0	0	1	8	2
WP: Yu Darvish (2–0) LP: Kyle Hendricks (1–1); Home runs: LAD: Andre Ethier (1), Chris Taylor (2); CHC: Kyle Schwarber (1); Attendance: 41,871

As the series shifted to Wrigley Field with the Cubs in an 0–2 hole, Kyle Hendricks looked to keep the Cubs in the series. Kyle Schwarber homered in the first inning to give the Cubs a 1–0 lead, but solo home runs in the second and third innings gave the Dodgers the lead. Hendricks was lifted in the sixth with two runners on and trailing 3–1, but a walk to Dodger starting pitcher Yu Darvish by Carl Edwards Jr. with the bases loaded moved the score to 4–1. The Dodgers added two more runs in the eighth on a wild pitch by Mike Montgomery and a sacrifice fly to increase the lead to 6–1. Albert Almora Jr. and Alex Avila singled and doubled in the ninth to put runners on second and third with no outs, but Dodger closer Kenley Jansen retired the next three batters to end the game. The loss moved the Cubs to brink of elimination, trailing in the series 3–0.

==== Game 4 ====
October 18, 2017 8:08 pm (CDT) at Wrigley Field in Chicago, Illinois
Team	1	2	3	4	5	6	7	8	9	R	H	E
Los Angeles	0	0	1	0	0	0	0	1	0	2	4	0
Chicago	0	2	0	0	1	0	0	0	X	3	5	0
WP: Jake Arrieta (1–1) LP: Alex Wood (0–1) Sv: Wade Davis (4); Home runs: LAD: Cody Bellinger (2), Justin Turner (3); CHC: Willson Contreras (2), Javier Báez 2 (2); Attendance: 42,195

Looking to stave off elimination, the Cubs sent Jake Arrieta to the mound against Dodger starter Alex Wood who had not yet appeared in the postseason. The Cubs started the scoring in the second on a 491-foot home run by Willson Contreras and, in his first hit in the postseason, Javier Báez also homered to give the Cubs a 2–0 lead in the second inning. The Dodgers answered immediately as Cody Bellinger hit a solo shot in the top of the third to cut the lead in half. Báez homered again in the fifth to extend the lead to 3–1. Arrieta pitched well, allowing only one run in 6.2 innings of work and left with two runners on in the seventh, but Brian Duensing retired the only batter he faced to end the inning. Wade Davis entered in the eighth for a two-inning save and promptly gave up a home run to Justin Turner, reducing the lead to 3–2. After two walks and an overturned strike three call that led to Joe Maddon being ejected, Davis was able to get out of the inning. In the ninth, Davis struck out Austin Barnes before walking Chris Taylor. Davis was able to induce Bellinger to hit into a game-ending double play to give the Cubs the win and extend the series to Game 5.

==== Game 5 ====
October 19, 2017 7:08 pm (CDT) at Wrigley Field in Chicago, Illinois
Team	1	2	3	4	5	6	7	8	9	R	H	E
Los Angeles	1	1	5	2	0	0	0	0	2	11	16	0
Chicago	0	0	0	1	0	0	0	0	0	1	4	0
WP: Clayton Kershaw (2–0) LP: José Quintana (0–1); Home runs: LAD: Enrique Hernández 3 (3), Chris Taylor (2), Logan Forsythe (1); CHC: Kris Bryant (1); Attendance: 42,735

The Dodgers scored first on an RBI hit by Cody Bellinger, followed by a second inning home run by Enrique Hernández. He would hit two more home runs later in the game; a grand slam in the third and two-run homer in the ninth. He became the fourth Dodger player to hit a postseason grand slam (joining Ron Cey and Dusty Baker from the 1977 NLCS and James Loney in the 2008 NLDS which was also against the Cubs). His seven RBIs were also a NLCS record. Chris Taylor and Justin Turner were voted co-MVPs of the series. The lone Chicago run came on a Kris Bryant home run in the fourth. Every Cubs run scored in the series came via a home run. With the 11–1 victory the Dodgers returned to the World Series for the first time since 1988.

==== Composite line score ====
2017 NLCS (4–1): Los Angeles Dodgers beat Chicago Cubs

Team	1	2	3	4	5	6	7	8	9	R	H	E
Chicago Cubs	1	2	0	3	2	0	0	0	0	8	23	2
Los Angeles Dodgers	1	2	7	2	4	2	2	3	5	28	42	0
Total attendance: 235,569 Average attendance: 47,114

=== Postseason rosters ===
Playoff rosters
National League Division Series

- Pitchers: 6 Carl Edwards Jr. 28 Kyle Hendricks 32 Brian Duensing 34 Jon Lester 37 Justin Wilson 38 Mike Montgomery 41 John Lackey 46 Pedro Strop 49 Jake Arrieta 62 José Quintana 71 Wade Davis
- Catchers: 13 Alex Avila 40 Willson Contreras
- Infielders: 2 Tommy La Stella 8 Ian Happ 9 Javier Báez 17 Kris Bryant 18 Ben Zobrist 27 Addison Russell 44 Anthony Rizzo
- Outfielders: 5 Albert Almora 12 Kyle Schwarber 22 Jason Heyward 24 Leonys Martín 30 Jon Jay

National League Championship Series

- Pitchers: 6 Carl Edwards Jr. 28 Kyle Hendricks 32 Brian Duensing 34 Jon Lester 38 Mike Montgomery 41 John Lackey 46 Pedro Strop 49 Jake Arrieta 56 Héctor Rondón 62 José Quintana 71 Wade Davis
- Catchers: 13 Alex Avila 40 Willson Contreras
- Infielders: 2 Tommy La Stella 8 Ian Happ 9 Javier Báez 17 Kris Bryant 18 Ben Zobrist 27 Addison Russell 44 Anthony Rizzo
- Outfielders: 5 Albert Almora 12 Kyle Schwarber 22 Jason Heyward 24 Leonys Martín 30 Jon Jay

== Achievements and records ==
- On April 14, Kris Bryant flew out to right field in the first inning to move to 0–14 on the season marking the worst start to a season by a reigning MVP.
- On August 19, Wade Davis converted his 26th consecutive save for the Cubs, tying the Cub record.
- On August 29, Wade Davis recorded his 27th consecutive save, a franchise record.
- On August 30, the Cubs set a Major League record with five players 25 years old or younger hitting at least 20 home runs: Javier Báez, Kris Bryant, Willson Contreras, Ian Happ, and Kyle Schwarber.
- On August 30, the Cubs set a franchise record with six players with 20 or more home runs on the season: Javier Báez, Kris Bryant, Willson Contreras, Ian Happ, Anthony Rizzo, and Kyle Schwarber.
- On August 30, Ian Happ became the fastest Cub to hit 20 home runs in franchise history, doing so in 89 games.
- On August 31, Kris Bryant became the first Cub in franchise history to hit 25 home runs in each of his first three seasons.
- The Cubs tied the franchise record, set the previous year, of nine players with at least 10 home runs.

== Statistics ==
=== Regular season ===
==== Batting ====
(Final regular season stats)

Note: G = Games played; AB = At bats; R = Runs; H = Hits; 2B = Doubles; 3B = Triples; HR = Home runs; RBI = Runs batted in; SB = Stolen bases; BB = Walks; K = Strikeouts; AVG = Batting average; OBP = On-base percentage; SLG = Slugging percentage; TB = Total bases

Player	G	AB	R	H	2B	3B	HR	RBI	SB	BB	K	AVG	OBP	SLG	TB
Albert Almora Jr.	132	299	39	89	18	1	8	46	1	19	53	.298	.338	.445	133
Brett Anderson	6	7	0	1	0	0	0	0	0	1	3	.143	.250	.393	1
Jake Arrieta	32	61	2	8	0	1	1	5	0	1	32	.131	.145	.213	13
Alex Avila	35	92	11	22	2	1	3	17	0	19	40	.239	.369	.380	35
Javier Báez	145	469	75	128	24	2	23	75	10	30	144	.273	.317	.480	225
Kris Bryant	151	549	111	162	38	4	29	73	7	95	128	.295	.409	.537	295
Eddie Butler	13	15	0	1	0	0	0	0	0	0	1	.067	.125	.067	1
Jeimer Candelario	11	33	2	5	2	0	1	3	0	1	12	.152	.222	.303	37
Víctor Caratini	31	59	6	15	3	0	1	2	0	4	13	.254	.333	.356	21
Willson Contreras	117	377	50	104	21	0	21	74	5	45	98	.276	.356	.499	188
Taylor Davis	8	13	1	3	1	0	0	1	0	0	4	.231	.231	.308	4
Brian Duensing	68	4	0	0	0	0	0	0	0	0	2	.000	.000	.000	0
Carl Edwards Jr.	74	1	1	0	0	0	0	0	0	0	1	.000	.000	.000	0
Dylan Floro	3	4	0	0	0	0	0	0	0	0	2	.000	.000	.000	0
Mike Freeman	15	25	3	4	2	0	0	0	0	2	8	.160	.222	.240	6
Justin Grimm	50	3	0	0	0	0	0	0	0	0	1	.000	.000	.000	0
Ian Happ	115	364	62	92	17	3	24	68	8	39	129	.253	.328	.514	187
Kyle Hendricks	25	50	3	5	1	0	0	5	0	0	28	.100	.100	.120	6
Jason Heyward	126	432	59	112	15	4	11	59	4	41	67	.259	.326	.389	168
Jon Jay	141	379	65	112	18	3	2	34	6	37	80	.296	.374	.375	142
Tommy La Stella	73	125	18	36	8	0	5	22	0	20	18	.288	.389	.472	59
John Lackey	32	53	2	7	1	0	0	1	1	3	23	.132	.179	.151	8
Jon Lester	32	54	5	8	3	0	1	6	1	4	26	.148	.203	.259	14
Leonys Martín	15	13	2	2	1	0	0	1	1	3	4	.154	.313	.231	3
Miguel Montero	44	98	12	28	3	0	4	8	1	11	24	.286	.366	.439	43
Mike Montgomery	44	27	5	5	1	0	1	3	0	0	10	.185	.185	.333	9
Félix Peña	25	3	0	0	0	0	0	0	0	1	1	.000	.250	.000	0
José Quintana	14	22	2	2	0	0	0	2	0	1	15	.091	.130	.091	2
René Rivera	20	44	8	15	5	0	2	12	0	5	16	.341	.408	.591	26
Anthony Rizzo	157	572	99	156	32	3	32	109	10	91	90	.273	.392	.507	290
Héctor Rondón	61	1	0	0	0	0	0	0	0	0	0	.000	.000	.000	0
Addison Russell	110	352	52	84	21	3	12	43	2	29	91	.239	.304	.418	147
Kyle Schwarber	129	422	67	89	16	1	30	59	1	59	150	.211	.315	.467	197
Pedro Strop	69	1	0	0	0	0	0	0	0	0	0	.000	.000	.000	0
Matt Szczur	15	19	2	4	1	0	0	3	0	2	4	.211	.273	.263	5
Jen-Ho Tseng	2	1	0	0	0	0	0	1	0	0	0	.000	.000	.000	0
Mark Zagunis	7	14	0	0	0	0	0	1	2	4	6	.000	.222	.000	0
Rob Zastryzny	4	3	0	1	0	0	0	0	0	0	0	.333	.333	.333	1
Ben Zobrist	128	435	58	101	20	3	12	50	2	54	71	.232	.318	.375	163
Team totals	162	5496	822	1402	274	29	223	785	62	622	1401	.255	.338	.437	2403

==== Pitching ====
(Final regular season stats)

Note: W = Wins; L = Losses; ERA = Earned run average; G = Games pitched; GS = Games started; SV = Saves; IP = Innings pitched; H = Hits allowed; R = Runs allowed; ER = Earned runs allowed; BB = Walks allowed; K = Strikeouts

Player	W	L	ERA	G	GS	SV	IP	H	R	ER	BB	K
Brett Anderson	2	2	8.18	6	6	0	22.0	34	22	120	12	16
Jake Arrieta	14	10	3.53	30	30	0	168.1	150	82	66	55	163
Eddie Butler	4	3	3.95	13	11	0	54.2	50	24	24	28	30
Wade Davis	4	2	2.30	59	0	32	58.2	39	16	15	28	79
Brian Duensing	1	1	2.74	68	0	0	62.1	58	19	19	18	61
Carl Edwards Jr.	5	4	2.98	73	0	0	66.1	29	22	22	38	94
Dylan Floro	0	0	6.52	3	0	0	9.2	15	7	7	2	6
Seth Frankoff	0	2	9.00	1	0	0	2.0	4	2	2	0	2
Justin Grimm	1	2	5.53	50	0	0	55.1	47	34	34	27	59
Kyle Hendricks	7	5	3.03	24	24	0	139.2	126	49	47	40	123
Jon Jay	0	0	0.00	1	0	0	1.0	1	0	0	0	0
Pierce Johnson	0	0	0.00	1	0	0	1.0	2	2	0	1	2
John Lackey	12	12	4.59	31	30	0	170.2	165	93	87	53	149
Jack Leathersich	0	0	27.00	1	0	0	0.2	1	2	2	4	2
Jon Lester	13	8	4.33	32	32	0	180.2	179	101	87	60	180
Dillon Maples	0	0	10.13	6	0	0	5.1	6	6	6	6	11
Leonys Martín	0	0	27.00	1	0	0	0.2	3	2	2	0	0
Miguel Montero	0	0	0.00	1	0	0	1.0	0	0	0	2	0
Mike Montgomery	7	8	3.38	44	14	3	130.2	103	52	49	55	100
Félix Peña	1	0	5.24	25	0	0	34.1	35	21	20	18	37
José Quintana	7	3	3.74	14	14	0	84.1	72	37	35	21	98
Héctor Rondón	4	1	4.24	61	0	0	57.1	50	30	27	20	69
Zac Rosscup	0	0	0.00	1	0	0	0.2	0	0	0	0	0
Pedro Strop	5	4	2.83	69	0	0	60.1	45	22	19	26	65
Jen-Ho Tseng	1	0	7.50	2	1	0	6.0	5	5	5	2	8
Koji Uehara	3	4	3.98	49	0	2	43.0	38	21	19	12	50
Justin Wilson	1	0	5.09	23	0	0	17.2	18	11	10	19	25
Rob Zastryzny	0	0	8.31	4	0	0	13.0	19	13	12	7	11
Team totals	92	70	3.95	162	162	38	1447.1	1294	695	636	554	1439

=== Postseason ===
==== Batting ====
(Final)

Note: G = Games played; AB = At bats; R = Runs; H = Hits; 2B = Doubles; 3B = Triples; HR = Home runs; RBI = Runs batted in; SB = Stolen bases; BB = Walks; K = Strikeouts; Avg. = Batting average; OBP = On-base percentage; SLG = Slugging percentage; TB = Total bases

Player	G	AB	R	H	2B	3B	HR	RBI	SB	BB	K	AVG	OBP	SLG	TB
Albert Almora Jr.	9	22	1	5	1	0	1	3	0	1	3	.227	.261	.409	9
Jake Arrieta	2	3	0	1	0	0	0	0	0	0	2	.333	.333	.333	1
Alex Avila	1	1	0	1	0	0	0	0	0	0	0	1.000	1.000	1.000	1
Javier Báez	10	26	3	2	0	0	2	8	2	2	11	.077	.143	.308	8
Kris Bryant	10	40	4	8	2	0	1	3	0	1	14	.200	.220	.325	13
Willson Contreras	10	32	5	7	0	0	2	2	0	6	11	.219	.342	.406	13
Wade Davis	5	1	0	0	0	0	0	0	0	1	0	000	.000	.000	0
Ian Happ	5	7	0	1	0	0	0	0	0	1	5	.143	.250	.143	1
Kyle Hendricks	3	5	0	0	0	0	0	0	0	0	4	.000	.000	.000	0
Jason Heyward	8	17	1	2	0	0	0	0	0	3	3	.118	.286	.118	2
Jon Jay	9	23	2	4	2	0	0	1	0	1	6	.174	.296	.261	6
Tommy La Stella	4	2	0	0	0	0	0	0	0	1	1	000	.333	.000	0
Jon Lester	3	4	0	1	0	0	0	0	0	0	2	.250	.250	.250	1
Leonys Martín	5	3	1	0	0	0	0	0	0	0	1	.000	.000	.000	0
José Quintana	4	4	0	1	0	0	0	0	0	0	3	.250	.250	.250	1
Anthony Rizzo	10	37	1	5	1	0	1	6	0	2	14	.135	.200	.243	9
Addison Russell	10	34	2	6	2	0	1	5	1	2	13	.176	.222	.324	11
Kyle Schwarber	7	17	2	3	0	0	1	1	0	3	5	.176	.300	.353	6
Ben Zobrist	9	26	3	4	2	0	0	0	0	1	6	.154	.185	.231	6

==== Pitching ====
(Final)

Note: W = Wins; L = Losses; ERA = Earned run average; G = Games pitched; GS = Games started; SV = Saves; IP = Innings pitched; H = Hits allowed; R = Runs allowed; ER = Earned runs allowed; BB = Walks allowed; K = Strikeouts

Player	W	L	ERA	G	GS	SV	IP	H	R	ER	BB	K
Jake Arrieta	1	1	0.84	2	2	0	10.2	5	2	1	10	13
Wade Davis	0	0	4.26	5	0	4	6.1	5	3	3	6	8
Brian Duensing	1	1	1.69	5	0	0	5.1	1	1	1	4	4
Carl Edwards Jr.	1	1	11.57	7	0	0	4.2	2	6	6	6	8
Kyle Hendricks	1	1	3.94	3	3	0	16.0	17	7	7	5	18
John Lackey	0	0	7.36	3	0	0	3.2	5	4	4	2	3
Jon Lester	0	0	1.88	3	2	0	14.1	6	3	3	8	7
Mike Montgomery	0	0	8.31	5	0	0	4.1	14	8	8	4	4
José Quintana	0	1	5.40	4	3	0	13.1	11	8	8	5	12
Héctor Rondón	0	1	6.00	3	0	0	3.0	5	2	2	0	4
Pedro Strop	0	0	1.69	5	0	0	5.1	1	1	1	3	1
Justin Wilson	0	0	0.00	1	0	0	0.2	0	0	0	0	0

== Farm system ==
Level	Team	League	Manager
AAA	Iowa Cubs	Pacific Coast League	Marty Pevey
AA	Tennessee Smokies	Southern League	Mark Johnson
A	Myrtle Beach Pelicans	Carolina League	Buddy Bailey
A	South Bend Cubs	Midwest League	Jimmy Gonzalez
A-Short Season	Eugene Emeralds	Northwest League	Jesús Feliciano
Rookie	AZL Cubs	Arizona League	Carmelo Martinez
Rookie	DSL Cubs	Dominican Summer League	Lance Rymel
