= Pedro Strop =

Dutch-Dominican baseball player (born 1985)

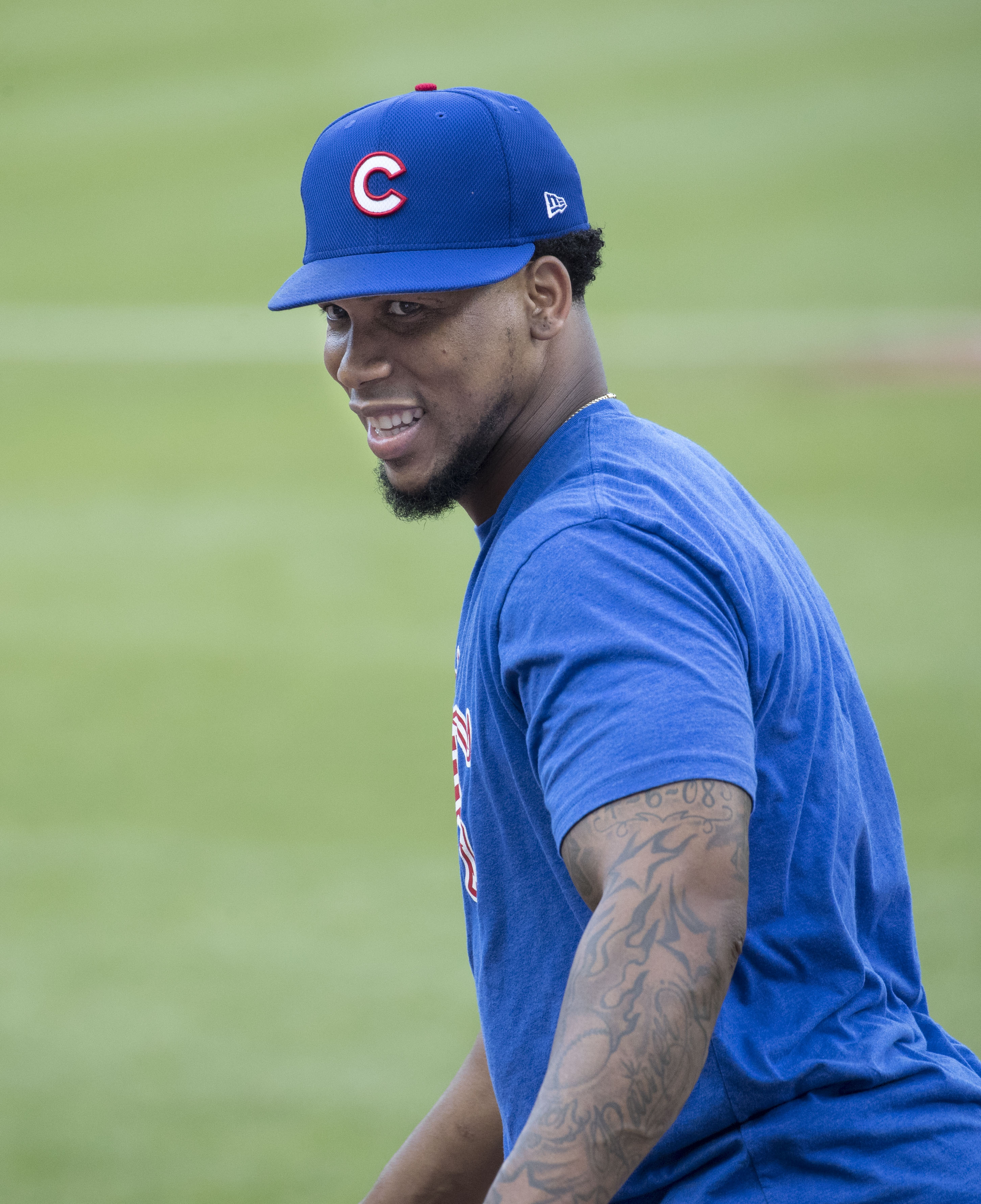
- Strop with the Chicago Cubs in 2017
- Pitcher
- Born: June 13, 1985 (age 41); San Cristóbal, Dominican Republic
- Batted: Right Threw: Right

MLB debut
- August 28, 2009, for the Texas Rangers

Last MLB appearance
- April 16, 2021, for the Chicago Cubs

MLB statistics
- Win–loss record: 29–30
- Earned run average: 3.20
- Strikeouts: 554
- Stats at Baseball Reference

Teams
- Texas Rangers (2009–2011); Baltimore Orioles (2011–2013); Chicago Cubs (2013–2019); Cincinnati Reds (2020); Chicago Cubs (2021)

Career highlights and awards
- World Series champion (2016)
Medals
Men's baseball
Representing Dominican Republic
World Baseball Classic
Gold medal – first place	2013 San Francisco	Team

Pedro Ángel Strop (born June 13, 1985) is a Dominican former professional baseball pitcher. He played in Major League Baseball (MLB) for the Texas Rangers, Baltimore Orioles, Cincinnati Reds, and Chicago Cubs.

== Career ==
=== Colorado Rockies ===
Strop originally signed as an international free agent with the Colorado Rockies in 2002. He was a position player in the minor leagues from 2002 to 2005, primarily playing shortstop. Strop moved from shortstop to pitching in 2006 due to posting poor hitting numbers. The Rockies released him on September 19, 2008.

=== Texas Rangers ===
Strop signed with the Texas Rangers as a free agent on September 23, 2008. On August 28, 2009, he made his MLB debut and struck out his first batter, future Hall of Famer Joe Mauer. Strop appeared in seven games in 2009, pitching seven innings. He gave up six hits, six runs, and four walks and had an ERA of 7.71. He struck out nine batters.

Strop pitched for the Rangers on June 2, 2010, against the White Sox in which he struck out one batter and walked a batter, then went back to the minors. After Texas traded for Bengie Molina, Strop returned to the majors. He pitched in three games before returning to the minors, when other trades were made. As of his last appearance on July 9 against Baltimore, he appeared in four games overall in the 2010 season, pitching 3.2 innings while giving up three hits and a run. He walked three batters and struck out three batters.

=== Baltimore Orioles ===
On August 31, 2011, Strop was traded from the Rangers to the Baltimore Orioles as the player to be named later in the trade for Mike Gonzalez. He finished the season going 2–0 for Baltimore with a 0.73 ERA. His pitching success continued for the majority of 2012.Through August 15, Strop hadd a 1.20 ERA primarily as a set up man to closer Jim Johnson. But over the final six weeks of the season, Strop's ERA was 7.24 with an OPS against of .916. He picked up a win against the Yankees pitching two innings in extra innings in the American League Division Series playoffs.

Though he pitched well in the World Baseball Classic prior to the start of the 2013 season, Strop's late season 2012 struggles continued. In 29 games for the Orioles, Strop went 0–3 with a 7.25 ERA. Baltimore crowds began to boo the reliever, and Strop said of the booing, "They [the fans] don't care about players, they care about good results." About two weeks after his comments, Strop was traded.

=== Chicago Cubs ===
==== 2013–2015 ====
On July 2, 2013, Strop was traded along with Jake Arrieta to the Cubs in exchange for Scott Feldman and Steve Clevenger. Strop primarily served in the setup role for the Cubs. In 37 appearances with the Cubs to finish 2013, Strop had a 2–2 record and a 2.83 ERA. Overall in 2013, combined with both teams, Strop made 66 total appearances with a 2–5 record and a 4.55 ERA.

In 2014, Strop made 65 appearances with a 2–4 record and a 2.21 ERA.

In 2015, Strop made 76 appearances with a 2–6 record, a 2.91 ERA, and 81 strikeouts.

==== 2016 ====
In 2016, Strop made 54 appearances with a 2–2 record and a 2.85 ERA. The Cubs would eventually win the World Series, giving Strop his first World Series title.

==== 2017–2019 ====
In 2017, Strop made 69 appearances with a 5–4 record, 65 strikeouts and a 2.83 ERA.

In 2018, Strop had one of his best seasons as a professional. He appeared in 60 games with a 6–1 record, 57 strikeouts, a career-high 13 saves, and a 2.26 ERA, the second best of his career.

In 2019, Strop had arguably his worst season as a professional. He appeared in only 50 games, his fewest since 2011. He finished the season with a 2–5 record, 49 strikeouts, 10 saves, and a 4.97 ERA, the worst of his career.

=== Cincinnati Reds ===
On January 30, 2020, Strop was signed by the Cincinnati Reds for a one-year, $1.8 million contract. Strop was designated for assignment by the Reds on August 26 and released on August 31.

=== Chicago Cubs (second stint) ===
On September 4, 2020, Strop signed a minor league contract to return to the Chicago Cubs. He joined the team at their alternate training site but did not join the big league team. He became a free agent on November 2.

On February 27, 2021, Strop re-signed with the Cubs organization on a minor league contract that included a Spring Training invitation. If he made the major league roster, he would earn a $800,000 salary. On April 12, Strop was selected to the active roster. Strop was removed from the 40-man roster on April 17 after 2 scoreless innings in 2 appearances. On May 5, Strop requested and was granted his release from the organization.

=== Sultanes de Monterrey ===
On June 24, 2021, Strop signed with the Sultanes de Monterrey of the Mexican League. Strop made 12 appearances for Monterrey, logging a 3.21 ERA with 16 strikeouts and three saves in 14 innings pitched. He was released by the team on March 1, 2022.

On May 6, 2023, Strop announced via Twitter that he was attempting a comeback.

=== Toros de Tijuana ===
On May 16, 2023, Strop signed with the Toros de Tijuana of the Mexican League. In 40 games for Tijuana, he compiled a 4–5 record and 4.38 ERA with 51 strikeouts across 39 innings pitched. Strop became a free agent following the season.

== International career ==
Strop was born in the Dominican Republic to a Curaçaoan father, making him eligible to represent the Dominican Republic, Curaçao, and the Netherlands in international competition. In 2013, Strop pitched as a reliever in the World Baseball Classic for the championship-winning Dominican Republic.

At the 2023 World Baseball Classic, Strop represented the Netherlands.

== Hat orientation ==
Strop is known for the unique way he wears his hat while pitching, slightly crooked to his left, similar to that of Fernando Rodney. Strop has said, "It goes back to when I was a little kid ... If you see pictures of me in baseball or out of baseball, my hat is like that or backwards."
