= Jack Leathersich =

American baseball player (born 1990)

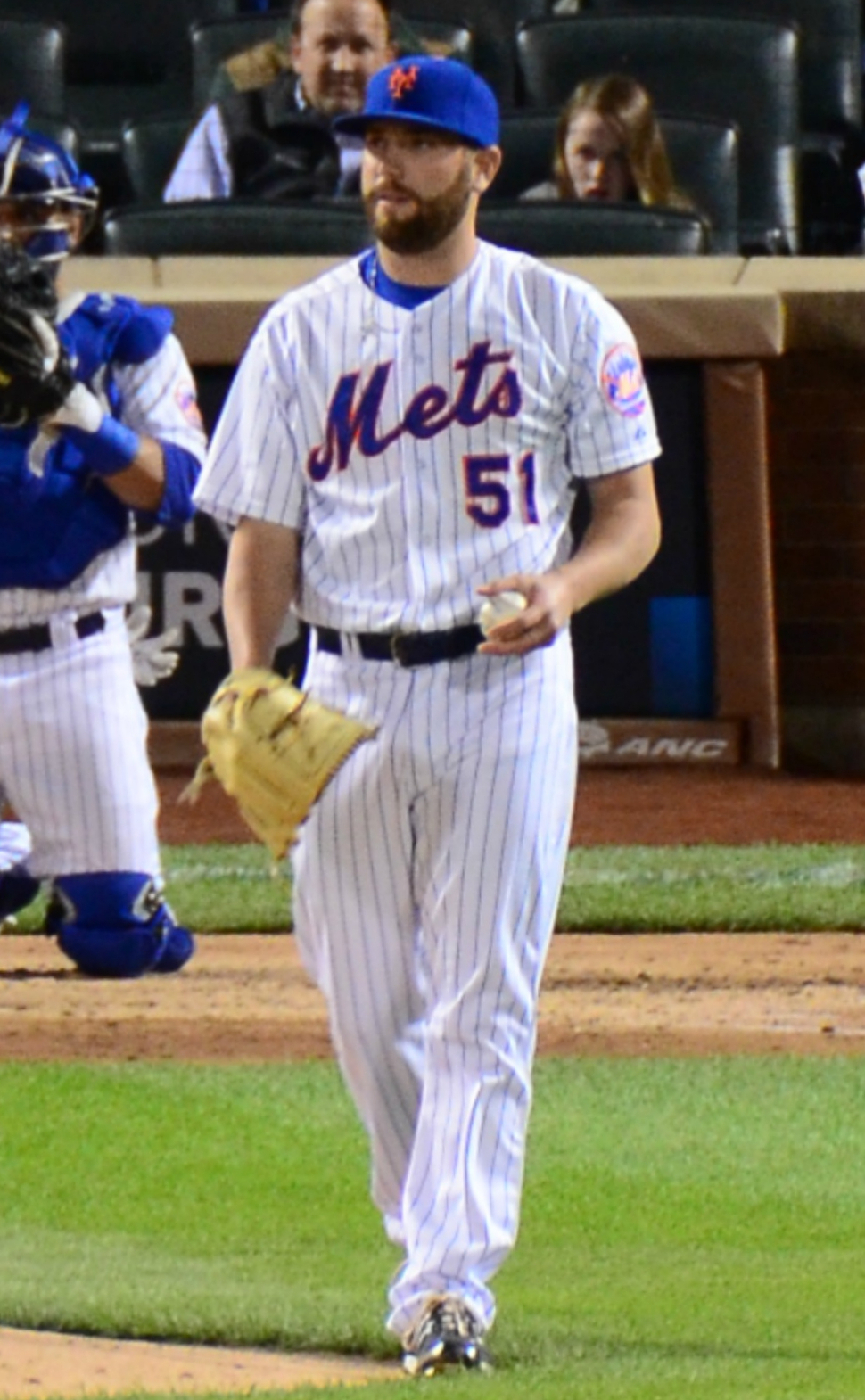
- Leathersich with the New York Mets in 2015
- Pitcher
- Born: July 14, 1990 (age 36); Beverly, Massachusetts, U.S.
- Batted: Right Threw: Left

MLB debut
- April 29, 2015, for the New York Mets

Last MLB appearance
- October 1, 2017, for the Pittsburgh Pirates

MLB statistics
- Win–loss record: 0–1
- Earned run average: 2.70
- Strikeouts: 21
- Stats at Baseball Reference

Teams
- New York Mets (2015); Chicago Cubs (2017); Pittsburgh Pirates (2017)

John Victor Leathersich (born July 14, 1990) is an American former professional baseball pitcher. He played in Major League Baseball (MLB) for the New York Mets, Chicago Cubs, and Pittsburgh Pirates between 2015 and 2017.

== Amateur career ==
After graduating from Beverly High School, Leathersich attended the University of Massachusetts Lowell. In 2010 and 2011, he played collegiate summer baseball with the Orleans Firebirds of the Cape Cod Baseball League. As a senior, he went 6–2 with a 1.62 earned run average 126 strikeouts (12.74 strikeouts per nine). The strikeouts and strikeouts per nine were both school records.

== Professional career ==
=== New York Mets ===
Leathersich was drafted by the New York Mets in the fifth round of the 2011 Major League Baseball draft. Leathersich made his professional debut with the short season Brooklyn Cyclones of the New York–Penn League. He finished the season with a 0.71 ERA and 26 strikeouts in 12 2/3 innings pitched. Leathersich started the 2012 season with the Savannah Sand Gnats of the South Atlantic League. He was promoted to the High-A St. Lucie Mets after posting a 0.75 earned run average and 37 strikeouts in 24 innings. In 48 innings with St. Lucie, he had a 4.26 ERA and 76 strikeouts. Leathersich was invited to spring training by the Mets in 2013. He started the season with the Double-A Binghamton Mets.

Leathersich was promoted to the major leagues for the first time on April 28, 2015. On May 1, 2015, Leathersich was sent down back to the Las Vegas 51s to make room for Dilson Herrera. He was called back up on May 14, 2015. On July 30, 2015, it was announced Jack Leathersich would undergo season ending Tommy John surgery.

Leathersich finished the 2015 season with a 0–1 record, 2.31 ERA in 17 games with 14 strikeouts in 11.2 innings pitched with a WHIP of 1.63 while giving up 12 hits, 3 runs, and 7 walks.

=== Chicago Cubs ===
Leathersich was claimed off waivers by the Chicago Cubs on November 19, 2015. He was then non-tendered by the Cubs on December 2, thus making him a free agent. On December 23, the Cubs re-signed Leathersich, and he spent the 2016 season in rehabilitation due to his Tommy John procedure. On November 18, 2016, the Cubs added Leathersich to their 40-man roster to protect him from the Rule 5 draft.

Leathersich's sole appearance for the Cubs came on July 6, 2017, against the Milwaukee Brewers, where he allowed two runs over 2/3 of an inning. The rest of his with the organization was spent with the Triple-A Iowa Cubs, for whom he compiled a 2–4 record and 2.84 ERA with 72 strikeouts across 41 appearances. On September 2, Leathersich was designated for assignment following the acquisition of Leonys Martín.

=== Pittsburgh Pirates ===
On September 4, 2017, Leathersich was claimed off waivers by the Pittsburgh Pirates. He made six scoreless appearances for the Pirates, recording six strikeouts across 4 1/3 innings pitched. Leathersich was placed on waivers on March 26, 2018.

=== Cleveland Indians ===
Leathersich was claimed off waivers by the Cleveland Indians on March 27, 2018. He was designated for assignment on April 26, following the promotion of Jeff Beliveau. Leathersich cleared waivers and was sent outright to the Triple-A Columbus Clippers on May 1. In 35 appearances for Columbus, he compiled an 0–2 record and 3.98 ERA with 34 strikeouts across 31 2/3 innings pitched. Leathersich was released by the Indians organization on July 12.

=== Texas Rangers ===
On December 21, 2018, Leathersich signed a minor league contract with the Texas Rangers. He was released prior to the start of the regular season on March 14, 2019.
