= 2017 Pittsburgh Pirates season =

Major League Baseball season

2017 Pittsburgh Pirates
- League: National League
- Division: Central
- Ballpark: PNC Park
- City: Pittsburgh, Pennsylvania
- Record: 75–87 (.463)
- Divisional place: 4th
- Owners: Bob Nutting
- General managers: Neal Huntington
- Managers: Clint Hurdle
- Television: Root Sports Pittsburgh (April–July); AT&T SportsNet Pittsburgh (July–October)
- Radio: KDKA-FM; Pittsburgh Pirates Radio Network (Steve Blass, Joe Block, Greg Brown, Bob Walk, John Wehner)
- Stats: ESPN.com; Baseball Reference

The 2017 Pittsburgh Pirates season was the franchise's 136th season overall, 131st season as a member of the National League, and the 17th season at PNC Park. They failed to improve on their record from the previous season and finished fourth in the National League Central. The Pirates failed to qualify for the playoffs for the second consecutive season.

== Offseason and spring training ==
Infielder Jung-ho Kang was found guilty by a South Korean court for his third offense of driving under the influence, and as a result, the initial request for a work visa to enter the United States for the 2017 season was denied. He would miss the whole season with the Pirates.

The Pirates recorded a 19–12 win–loss record in preseason spring training, the third best record in the Grapefruit League. In addition, two of their games finished tied and were therefore not included in the standings.

== Regular season ==
=== April ===
- April 3 – The Pirates lost on Opening Day to the Boston Red Sox 5–3.
- April 7 – In their home opener against the Atlanta Braves, the Pirates defeated the Braves 5–4. The Pirates would go on to win all three games of the series to sweep the Braves.
- April 9 – Starling Marte hit a walk-off home run in the tenth inning to propel the Pirates to a 5–4 win and series sweep over the Braves.
- April 12 – The Pirates were swept by the Cincinnati Reds following a 9–2 loss.
- April 16 – Following a four-game losing streak, the Pirates rally to beat the Chicago Cubs 6–1 to sweep the three-game series at Wrigley Field.
- April 18 – Starling Marte was suspended 80 games after testing positive for nandrolone, a performance-enhancing substance; he will not be eligible to return until after the team's 93rd game on July 17 and is ineligible for postseason play if the team qualifies.
- April 19 – The Pirates were swept following three straight 2–1 losses to the St. Louis Cardinals. The Pirates have been swept in three of the five series to date and have swept their opponent in the other two series to date.
- April 22 – The Pirates lost to the New York Yankees 11–5 after beating them in the first game of the series. The series marks the first series of the year where the Pirates did not sweep their opponent nor did they get swept.
- April 24 - the Pirates fielded the first baseball player to be born and raised in Lithuania, to reach the major leagues, Dovydas Neverauskas. In 1933, Joe Zapustas was the first Lithuanian-born player to play in MLB, as a member of the Philadelphia Athletics, however he grew up in Boston.
- April 26 - The Pirates promoted South African Gift Ngoepe from the AAA Indianapolis Indians; making him the first African-born player in MLB history.
- The Pirates finished the month with a win–loss record of 11–13, fourth in the NL Central at 2.0 games out of first.

=== May ===
- May 3 – Iván Nova was named NL Pitcher of the Month for April.

=== June ===
- Andrew McCutchen is named the National League Player of the Month

=== July ===
- July 2 – Josh Harrison is elected to the 2017 Major League Baseball All-Star Game.
- July 18 – Starling Marte is reactivated after performance-enhancing drug suspension

=== August ===
- August 6 – Sean Rodriguez, in his first game since being re-acquired by the Pirates a day earlier, hits a walk-off home run in the twelfth inning to give the Pirates a 5–4 victory over the San Diego Padres.
- August 20 – The Pirates defeated the St. Louis Cardinals, 6–3, in the 2017 MLB Little League Classic held at Bowman Field, located in Williamsport, Pennsylvania.
- August 23 – Josh Harrison became the first player in MLB history to break up a no-hitter in extra innings with a walk-off home run. The home run was hit in the tenth inning, off of pitcher Rich Hill, to give the Pirates a 1–0 win over the Los Angeles Dodgers.

=== September ===
- September 4 - Josh Bell broke the National League record for most home runs by a rookie switch hitter, hitting his 24th of the season off of Jake Arrieta, in a 12-0 Pirates' rout of the Chicago Cubs
- September 5 - Longtime Pirates TV broadcaster Kent Tekulve announced his retirement, after the Pirates' 4–3 win over the visiting Chicago Cubs.

== Season standings ==
=== National League Central ===
NL Central
Team	W	L	Pct.	GB	Home	Road
Chicago Cubs	92	70	.568	—	48‍–‍33	44‍–‍37
Milwaukee Brewers	86	76	.531	6	46‍–‍38	40‍–‍38
St. Louis Cardinals	83	79	.512	9	44‍–‍37	39‍–‍42
Pittsburgh Pirates	75	87	.463	17	44‍–‍37	31‍–‍50
Cincinnati Reds	68	94	.420	24	39‍–‍42	29‍–‍52

=== National League playoff standings ===
Division leaders
Team	W	L	Pct.
Los Angeles Dodgers	104	58	.642
Washington Nationals	97	65	.599
Chicago Cubs	92	70	.568

Wild Card teams (Top 2 teams qualify for postseason)
Team	W	L	Pct.	GB
Arizona Diamondbacks	93	69	.574	+6
Colorado Rockies	87	75	.537	—
Milwaukee Brewers	86	76	.531	1
St. Louis Cardinals	83	79	.512	4
Miami Marlins	77	85	.475	10
Pittsburgh Pirates	75	87	.463	12
Atlanta Braves	72	90	.444	15
San Diego Padres	71	91	.438	16
New York Mets	70	92	.432	17
Cincinnati Reds	68	94	.420	19
Philadelphia Phillies	66	96	.407	21
San Francisco Giants	64	98	.395	23

=== Record vs. opponents ===
2017 National League record Source: MLB Standings Grid – 2017
Team	AZ	ATL	CHC	CIN	COL	LAD	MIA	MIL	NYM	PHI	PIT	SD	SF	STL	WSH	AL
Arizona	—	2–4	3–3	3–3	11–8	11–8	3–4	4–3	6–1	6–1	4–3	11–8	12–7	3–4	2–4	12–8
Atlanta	4–2	—	1–6	3–3	3–4	3–4	11–8	4–2	7–12	6–13	2–5	5–2	4–3	1–5	9–10	9–11
Chicago	3–3	6–1	—	12–7	2–5	2–4	4–3	10–9	4–2	4–3	10–9	2–4	4–3	14–5	3–4	12–8
Cincinnati	3–3	3–3	7–12	—	3–4	0–6	2–5	8–11	3–4	4–2	13–6	3–4	4–3	9–10	1–6	5–15
Colorado	8–11	4–3	5–2	4–3	—	10–9	2–4	4–3	3–3	5–2	3–3	12–7	12–7	2–4	3–4	10–10
Los Angeles	8–11	4–3	4–2	6–0	9–10	—	6–1	3–3	7–0	4–3	6–1	13–6	11–8	4–3	3–3	16–4
Miami	4–3	8–11	3–4	5–2	4–2	1–6	—	2–4	12–7	8–11	3–4	5–1	5–1	2–5	6–13	9–11
Milwaukee	3–4	2–4	9–10	11–8	3–4	3–3	4–2	—	5–2	3–3	9–10	5–2	3–4	11–8	4–3	11–9
New York	1–6	12–7	2–4	4–3	3–3	0–7	7–12	2–5	—	12–7	3–3	3–4	5–1	3–4	6–13	7–13
Philadelphia	1–6	13–6	3–4	2–4	2–5	3–4	11–8	3–3	7–12	—	2–5	1–5	4–3	1–5	8–11	5–15
Pittsburgh	3–4	5–2	9–10	6–13	3–3	1–6	4–3	10–9	3–3	5–2	—	3–3	1–5	8–11	4–3	10–10
San Diego	8–11	2–5	4–2	4–3	7–12	6–13	1–5	2–5	4–3	5–1	3–3	—	12–7	3–4	2–5	8–12
San Francisco	7–12	3–4	3–4	3–4	7–12	8–11	1–5	4–3	1–5	3–4	5–1	7–12	—	3–4	1–5	8–12
St. Louis	4–3	5–1	5–14	10–9	4–2	3–4	5–2	8–11	4–3	5–1	11–8	4–3	4–3	—	3–3	8–12
Washington	4–2	10–9	4–3	6–1	4–3	3–3	13–6	3–4	13–6	11–8	3–4	5–2	5–1	3–3	—	10–10

=== Detailed records ===
National League
Opponent	W	L	WP	RS	RA
NL East
Atlanta Braves	5	2	0.714	45	33
Miami Marlins	4	3	0.571	37	38
New York Mets	3	3	0.500	33	31
Philadelphia Phillies	5	2	0.714	23	19
Washington Nationals	4	3	0.571	40	33
Total	21	13	0.618	178	154
NL Central
Chicago Cubs	9	10	0.474	79	99
Cincinnati Reds	6	13	0.316	60	84
Milwaukee Brewers	10	9	0.526	67	59
**Pittsburgh Pirates**					
St. Louis Cardinals	8	11	0.421	78	84
Total	33	43	0.434	284	326
NL West
Arizona Diamondbacks	3	4	0.429	24	32
Colorado Rockies	3	3	0.500	32	34
Los Angeles Dodgers	1	6	0.143	19	40
San Diego Padres	3	3	0.500	28	33
San Francisco Giants	1	5	0.167	23	36
Total	11	21	0.344	126	175
American League
Baltimore Orioles	2	2	0.500	26	19
Boston Red Sox	0	3	0.000	6	12
Detroit Tigers	3	1	0.750	16	18
New York Yankees	2	1	0.667	13	15
Tampa Bay Rays	2	1	0.667	12	6
Toronto Blue Jays	1	2	0.333	7	16
Total	10	10	0.500	80	86
Season Total	75	87	0.463	668	731

Month	Games	Won	Lost	Win %	RS	RA
April	24	11	13	0.458	90	110
May	30	13	17	0.433	122	140
June	26	13	13	0.500	129	126
July	25	14	11	0.560	105	94
August	29	12	17	0.414	114	159
September	27	11	16	0.407	97	94
October	1	1	0	1.000	11	8
Total	162	75	87	0.463	668	731

	Games	Won	Lost	Win %	RS	RA
Home	80	43	37	0.543	329	352
Away	81	31	50	0.383	339	379
Total	162	75	87	0.463	668	731

=== Game log ===
2017 Game Log: 75–87 (Home: 44–37; Away: 31–50)
April: 11–13 (Home: 6–6; Away: 5–7)

#	Date	Opponent	Score	Win	Loss	Save	Attendance	Record	Streak
1	April 3	@ Red Sox	3–5	Porcello (1–0)	**Cole** (0–1)	Kimbrel (1)	36,594	0–1	L1
2	April 5	@ Red Sox	0–3 (12)	Kelly (1–0)	**Bastardo** (0–1)	—	36,137	0–2	L2
–	April 6	@ Red Sox	PPD, RAIN; rescheduled for April 13						
3	April 7	Braves	5–4	**Nova** (1–0)	Foltynewicz (0–1)	**Watson** (1)	36,484	1–2	W1
4	April 8	Braves	6–4	**Kuhl** (1–0)	Dickey (0–1)	**Watson** (2)	33,004	2–2	W2
5	April 9	Braves	5–4 (10)	**Rivero** (1–0)	Ramírez (0–1)	—	22,713	3–2	W3
6	April 10	Reds	1–7	Lorenzen (1–0)	**Glasnow** (0–1)	—	28,264	3–3	L1
7	April 11	Reds	2–6	Storen (1–0)	**Nicasio** (0–1)	Iglesias (3)	11,027	3–4	L2
8	April 12	Reds	2–9	Garrett (2–0)	**Nova** (1–1)	—	12,327	3–5	L3
9	April 13	@ Red Sox	3–4	Barnes (2–0)	**Nicasio** (0–2)	Kimbrel (3)	32,400	3–6	L4
10	April 14	@ Cubs	4–2	**Cole** (1–1)	Hendricks (1–1)	**Watson** (3)	40,430	4–6	W1
11	April 15	@ Cubs	8–7	**Williams** (1–0)	Duensing (0–1)	**Watson** (4)	41,814	5–6	W2
12	April 16	@ Cubs	6–1	**Taillon** (1–0)	Uehara (0–1)	—	39,422	6–6	W3
13	April 17	@ Cardinals	1–2	Lynn (1–1)	**Nova** (1–2)	Oh (1)	40,172	6–7	L1
14	April 18	@ Cardinals	1–2	Leake (2–1)	**Kuhl** (1–1)	Oh (2)	38,806	6–8	L2
15	April 19	@ Cardinals	1–2	Wacha (2–1)	**Cole** (1–2)	Rosenthal (1)	40,182	6–9	L3
16	April 21	Yankees	6–3	**Nicasio** (1–2)	Sabathia (2–1)	**Watson** (5)	30,565	7–9	W1
17	April 22	Yankees	5–11	Betances (2–1)	**Rivero** (1–1)	—	36,140	7–10	L1
18	April 23	Yankees	2–1	**Nova** (2–2)	Montgomery (1–1)	**Watson** (6)	27,840	8–10	W1
19	April 24	Cubs	3–14	Anderson (2–0)	**Kuhl** (1–2)	—	13,445	8–11	L1
20	April 25	Cubs	0–1	Hendricks (2–1)	**Cole** (1–3)	Davis (5)	15,326	8–12	L2
21	April 26	Cubs	6–5	**LeBlanc** (1–0)	Lester (0–1)	**Watson** (7)	16,904	9–12	W1
22	April 28	@ Marlins	12–2	**Taillon** (2–0)	Conley (1–2)	—	19,690	10–12	W2
23	April 29	@ Marlins	4–0	**Nova** (3–2)	Straily (1–2)	—	33,152	11–12	W3
24	April 30	@ Marlins	3–10	McGowan (1–0)	**Williams** (1–1)	—	26,245	11–13	L1

May: 13–17 (Home: 8–7; Away: 5–10)

#	Date	Opponent	Score	Win	Loss	Save	Attendance	Record	Streak
25	May 1	@ Reds	3–4 (10)	Lorenzen (2–0)	**Hudson** (0–1)	—	14,753	11–14	L2
26	May 2	@ Reds	12–3	**Glasnow** (1–1)	Feldman (1–3)	**LeBlanc** (1)	13,909	12–14	W1
27	May 3	@ Reds	2–7	Davis (1–1)	**Taillon** (2–1)	—	14,297	12–15	L1
28	May 4	@ Reds	2–4	Adleman (1–1)	**Nova** (3–3)	Iglesias (5)	17,896	12–16	L2
29	May 5	Brewers	4–0	**LeBlanc** (2–0)	Scahill (0–1)	—	21,129	13–16	W1
30	May 6	Brewers	2–1 (10)	**Watson** (1–0)	Torres (1–3)	—	22,902	14–16	W2
31	May 7	Brewers	2–6	Davies (3–2)	**Glasnow** (1–2)	—	25,108	14–17	L1
32	May 8	@ Dodgers	1–12	Wood (3–0)	**Williams** (1–2)	—	37,314	14–18	L2
33	May 9	@ Dodgers	3–4 (10)	Jansen (2–0)	**Hudson** (0–2)	—	47,720	14–19	L3
34	May 10	@ Dodgers	2–5	Maeda (3–2)	**Kuhl** (1–3)	—	40,719	14–20	L4
35	May 11	@ Diamondbacks	1–2	Greinke (4–2)	**Cole** (1–4)	Rodney (9)	17,527	14–21	L5
36	May 12	@ Diamondbacks	4–11	Corbin (3–4)	**Glasnow** (1–3)	—	21,911	14–22	L6
37	May 13	@ Diamondbacks	4–3	**Williams** (2–2)	Walker (3–3)	**Watson** (8)	31,673	15–22	W1
38	May 14	@ Diamondbacks	6–4 (10)	**Watson** (2–0)	Wilhelmsen (0–1)	—	34,088	16–22	W2
39	May 16	Nationals	4–8	Strasburg (4–1)	**Kuhl** (1–4)	—	16,992	16–23	L1
40	May 17	Nationals	6–1	**Cole** (2–4)	Turner (2–2)	—	18,803	17–23	W1
41	May 18	Nationals	10–4	**Glasnow** (2–3)	Roark (3–2)	—	27,728	18–23	W2
42	May 19	Phillies	2–7	Hellickson (5–1)	**Williams** (2–3)	—	25,795	18–24	L1
43	May 20	Phillies	6–3	**Nova** (4–3)	Velasquez (2–4)	**Watson** (9)	32,572	19–24	W1
44	May 21	Phillies	1–0	**LeBlanc** (3–0)	Nola (2–1)	**Watson** (10)	24,445	20–24	W2
45	May 22	@ Braves	2–5	Foltynewicz (3–4)	**Cole** (2–5)	Johnson (9)	21,896	20–25	L1
46	May 23	@ Braves	5–6	Jackson (1–0)	**Watson** (2–1)	—	25,040	20–26	L2
47	May 24	@ Braves	12–5 (10)	**Rivero** (2–1)	Collmenter (0–2)	—	25,981	21–26	W1
48	May 25	@ Braves	9–4	**Nova** (5–3)	Colón (2–5)	—	33,713	22–26	W2
49	May 26	Mets	1–8	deGrom (4–1)	**Kuhl** (1–5)	—	29,408	22–27	L1
50	May 27	Mets	5–4 (10)	**Watson** (3–1)	Pill (0–1)	—	31,658	23–27	W1
51	May 28	Mets	2–7	Harvey (4–3)	**Glasnow** (2–4)	—	21,828	23–28	L1
52	May 29	Diamondbacks	4–3	**Watson** (4–1)	Bradley (1–1)	—	16,939	24–28	W1
53	May 30	Diamondbacks	0–3	Ray (5–3)	**Nova** (5–4)	—	14,996	24–29	L1
54	May 31	Diamondbacks	5–6 (14)	McFarland (3–0)	**Mariñez** (0–3)	—	20,990	24–30	L2

June: 13–13 (Home: 7–7; Away: 6–6)

#	Date	Opponent	Score	Win	Loss	Save	Attendance	Record	Streak
55	June 2	@ Mets	12–7	**Cole** (3–5)	Sewald (0–1)	—	33,047	25–30	W1
56	June 3	@ Mets	2–4	Gsellman (4–3)	**Glasnow** (2–5)	Reed (8)	34,035	25–31	L1
57	June 4	@ Mets	11–1	**Williams** (3–3)	Pill (0–2)	—	35,323	26–31	W1
58	June 6	@ Orioles	5–6 (10)	Brach (1–1)	**LeBlanc** (3–1)	—	26,724	26–32	L1
59	June 7	@ Orioles	6–9 (11)	Givens (6–0)	**LeBlanc** (3–2)	—	19,957	26–33	L2
60	June 8	Marlins	1–7	Vólquez (3–7)	**Cole** (3–6)	—	21,744	26–34	L3
61	June 9	Marlins	5–12	McGowan (4–0)	**Glasnow** (2–6)	—	23,950	26–35	L4
62	June 10	Marlins	7–6	**Hudson** (1–2)	Phelps (2–3)	**Rivero** (1)	27,275	27–35	W1
63	June 11	Marlins	3–1	**Nova** (6–4)	Locke (0–2)	**Rivero** (2)	22,925	28–35	W2
64	June 12	Rockies	7–2	**Taillon** (3–1)	Freeland (7–4)	—	16,320	29–35	W3
65	June 13	Rockies	5–2	**Cole** (4–6)	Ottavino (0–1)	—	16,764	30–35	W4
66	June 14	Rockies	1–5	Márquez (5–3)	**Kuhl** (1–6)	—	17,308	30–36	L1
67	June 16	Cubs	5–9	Uehara (2–3)	**Nicasio** (1–3)	—	25,420	30–37	L2
68	June 17	Cubs	4–3	**Nova** (7–4)	Arrieta (6–5)	**Rivero** (3)	34,383	31–37	W1
69	June 18	Cubs	1–7	Lackey (5–7)	**Taillon** (3–2)	—	34,539	31–38	L1
70	June 19	@ Brewers	8–1	**Cole** (5–6)	Garza (3–3)	—	25,489	32–38	W1
71	June 20	@ Brewers	7–3	**Kuhl** (2–6)	Davies (7–4)	—	23,982	33–38	W2
72	June 21	@ Brewers	3–4	Drake (3–2)	**Hudson** (1–3)	Knebel (11)	25,134	33–39	L1
73	June 22	@ Brewers	2–4	Anderson (6–2)	**Nova** (7–5)	Knebel (12)	28,428	33–40	L2
74	June 23	@ Cardinals	4–3	**Rivero** (3–1)	Oh (1–4)	—	47,112	34–40	W1
75	June 24	@ Cardinals	7–3	**Cole** (6–6)	Lynn (5–5)	—	46,735	35–40	W2
76	June 25	@ Cardinals	4–8	Rosenthal (2–3)	**Nicasio** (1–4)	—	43,719	35–41	L1
77	June 27	Rays	2–4 (10)	Colomé (2–3)	**Rivero** (3–2)	Hunter (1)	20,424	35–42	L2
78	June 28	Rays	6–2	**Nova** (8–5)	Snell (0–5)	—	21,582	36–42	W1
79	June 29	Rays	4–0	**Taillon** (4–2)	Archer (6–5)	—	22,595	37–42	W2
80	June 30	Giants	5–13	Cueto (6–7)	**Cole** (6–7)	—	26,407	37–43	L1

July: 14–11 (Home: 6–3; Away: 8–8)

#	Date	Opponent	Score	Win	Loss	Save	Attendance	Record	Streak
81	July 1	Giants	1–2 (11)	Osich (2–1)	**Hudson** (1–4)	Dyson (1)	27,247	37–44	L2
82	July 2	Giants	3–5	Samardzija (4–9)	**Watson** (4–2)	Dyson (2)	32,144	37–45	L3
83	July 3	@ Phillies	0–4	Nola (6–5)	**Nova** (8–6)	—	26,498	37–46	L4
84	July 4	@ Phillies	3–0	**Taillon** (5–1)	Leiter (1–1)	**Rivero** (4)	24,087	38–46	W1
85	July 5	@ Phillies	5–2	**Cole** (7–7)	Lively (1–4)	**Rivero** (5)	19,099	39–46	W2
86	July 6	@ Phillies	6–3	**Kuhl** (3–6)	Benoit (1–3)	**Nicasio** (1)	33,059	40–46	W3
87	July 7	@ Cubs	1–6	Edwards Jr. (3–1)	**Williams** (3–4)	—	41,294	40–47	L1
88	July 8	@ Cubs	4–2	**Nova** (9–6)	Arrieta (8–7)	**Rivero** (6)	41,865	41–47	W1
89	July 9	@ Cubs	14–3	**Schugel** (1–0)	Lester (5–6)	—	41,604	42–47	W2
**88th All-Star Game in Miami, Florida**
90	July 14	Cardinals	5–2	**Rivero** (4–2)	Oh (1–5)	—	24,988	43–47	W3
91	July 15	Cardinals	0–4	Lynn (8–6)	**Taillon** (5–3)	—	35,658	43–48	L1
92	July 16	Cardinals	4–3	**LeBlanc** (4–2)	Cecil (1–3)	—	29,247	44–48	W1
93	July 17	Brewers	4–2	**Hudson** (2–4)	Hader (1–1)	**Rivero** (7)	18,506	45–48	W2
94	July 18	Brewers	4–3	**Nova** (10–6)	Drake (3–3)	**Rivero** (8)	20,462	46–48	W3
95	July 19	Brewers	3–2 (10)	**Watson** (5–2)	Hughes (3–2)	—	24,401	47–48	W4
96	July 20	Brewers	4–2	**Taillon** (6–3)	Nelson (8–5)	**Rivero** (9)	33,493	48–48	W5
97	July 21	@ Rockies	13–5	**Williams** (4–4)	Hoffman (6–2)	—	41,192	49–48	W6
98	July 22	@ Rockies	3–7	Márquez (8–4)	**Kuhl** (3–7)	Holland (31)	48,235	49–49	L1
99	July 23	@ Rockies	3–13	Freeland (10–7)	**Nova** (10–7)	—	40,118	49–50	L2
100	July 24	@ Giants	10–3	**Cole** (8–7)	Cain (3–9)	—	40,030	50–50	W1
101	July 25	@ Giants	3–11	Bumgarner (1–4)	**Taillon** (6–4)	Stratton (1)	41,232	50–51	L1
102	July 26	@ Giants	1–2	Samardzija (5–11)	**Watson** (5–3)	Dyson (6)	41,038	50–52	L2
103	July 28	@ Padres	2–3	Wood (2–3)	**Hudson** (2–5)	Hand (6)	24,215	50–53	L3
104	July 29	@ Padres	2–4	Lamet (5–4)	**Nova** (10–8)	Yates (1)	37,286	50–54	L4
105	July 30	@ Padres	7–1	**Cole** (9–7)	Richard (5–12)	—	30,267	51–54	W1

August: 12–17 (Home: 8–8; Away: 4–9)

#	Date	Opponent	Score	Win	Loss	Save	Attendance	Record	Streak
106	August 1	Reds	1–9	Bailey (3–5)	**Taillon** (6–5)	—	22,403	51–55	L1
107	August 2	Reds	2–5	Lorenzen (6–2)	**Benoit** (1–5)	Iglesias (18)	22,367	51–56	L2
108	August 3	Reds	6–0	**Kuhl** (4–7)	Romano (2–3)	—	25,955	52–56	W1
109	August 4	Padres	10–6	**Schugel** (2–0)	Yates (2–2)	—	32,243	53–56	W2
110	August 5	Padres	2–5	Lamet (6–4)	**Cole** (9–8)	Hand (8)	31,817	53–57	L1
111	August 6	Padres	5–4 (12)	**Neverauskas** (1–0)	Baumann (0–1)	—	34,175	54–57	W1
112	August 7	Tigers	3–0	**Williams** (5–4)	Zimmermann (7–9)	**Nicasio** (2)	21,651	55–57	W2
113	August 8	Tigers	6–3	**Kuhl** (5–7)	Boyd (5–6)	**Rivero** (10)	25,112	56–57	W3
114	August 9	@ Tigers	0–10	Verlander (8–7)	**Nova** (10–9)	—	28,902	56–58	L1
115	August 10	@ Tigers	7–5	**Cole** (10–8)	VerHagen (0–2)	**Rivero** (11)	33,490	57–58	W1
116	August 11	@ Blue Jays	4–2	**Taillon** (7–5)	Stroman (10–6)	**Rivero** (12)	35,965	58–58	W2
117	August 12	@ Blue Jays	2–7	Rowley (1–0)	**Williams** (5–5)	—	46,179	58–59	L1
118	August 13	@ Blue Jays	1–7	Happ (6–8)	**Kuhl** (5–8)	—	43,618	58–60	L2
119	August 15	@ Brewers	1–3	Davies (14–6)	**Nova** (10–10)	Knebel (23)	32,605	58–61	L3
120	August 16	@ Brewers	6–7	Swarzak (5–3)	**Nicasio** (1–5)	Knebel (24)	32,439	58–62	L4
121	August 17	Cardinals	7–11	Tuivailala (3–1)	**Benoit** (1–6)	—	31,499	58–63	L5
122	August 18	Cardinals	10–11	Martinez (10–9)	**Williams** (5–6)	Oh (19)	29,906	58–64	L6
123	August 19	Cardinals	6–4	**Kuhl** (6–8)	Wacha (9–6)	**Rivero** (13)	34,660	59–64	W1
124**	August 20	Cardinals	6–3	**Nova** (11–10)	Leake (7–12)	**Rivero** (14)	2,596	60–64	W2
125	August 21	Dodgers	5–6 (12)	Avilan (2–1)	**Neverauskas** (1–1)	Stripling (2)	19,094	60–65	L1
126	August 22	Dodgers	5–8	Watson (7–4)	**Barbato** (0–1)	Jansen (34)	17,288	60–66	L2
127	August 23	Dodgers	1–0 (10)	**Nicasio** (2–5)	Hill (9–5)	—	19,859	61–66	W1
128	August 24	Dodgers	2–5	Ryu (5–6)	**Kuhl** (6–9)	Morrow (1)	22,115	61–67	L1
129	August 25	@ Reds	5–9	Stephenson (2–4)	**Nova** (11–11)	—	20,561	61–68	L2
130	August 26	@ Reds	1–0	**Cole** (11–8)	Castillo (2–7)	**Rivero** (15)	35,259	62–68	W1
131	August 27	@ Reds	5–2	**Schugel** (3–0)	Mahle (0–1)	**Rivero** (16)	26,155	63–68	W2
132	August 28	@ Cubs	1–6	Montgomery (5–6)	**Williams** (5–7)	—	38,453	63–69	L1
133	August 29	@ Cubs	1–4	Arrieta (14–8)	**Kuhl** (6–10)	Davis (27)	37,370	63–70	L2
134	August 30	@ Cubs	3–17	Quintana (9–11)	**Nova** (11–12)	—	36,628	63–71	L3

September/October: 12–16 (Home: 9–6; Away: 3–10)

#	Date	Opponent	Score	Win	Loss	Save	Attendance	Record	Streak
135	September 1	Reds	3–7	Wojciechowski (4–3)	**Cole** (11–9)	—	23,569	63–72	L4
136	September 2	Reds	5–0	**Schugel** (4–0)	Lorenzen (8–3)	—	23,529	64–72	W1
137	September 3	Reds	3–1	**Williams** (6–7)	Romano (4–6)	**Rivero** (17)	24,474	65–72	W2
138	September 4	Cubs	12–0	**Kuhl** (7–10)	Arrieta (14–7)	—	21,068	66–72	W3
139	September 5	Cubs	4–3	**LeBlanc** (5–2)	Edwards Jr. (3–4)	**Rivero** (18)	14,079	67–72	W4
140	September 6	Cubs	0–1	Strop (4–4)	**Hudson** (2–6)	Davis (29)	17,067	67–73	L1
141	September 7	Cubs	2–8	Lester (10–7)	**Taillon** (7–6)	—	19,201	67–74	L2
142	September 8	@ Cardinals	1–4	Weaver (5–1)	**Williams** (6–8)	Nicasio (3)	40,966	67–75	L3
143	September 9	@ Cardinals	3–4	Lyons (4–0)	**Kontos** (2–6)	Nicasio (4)	44,378	67–76	L4
144	September 10	@ Cardinals	0–7	Wacha (12–7)	**Nova** (11–13)	—	44,683	67–77	L5
145	September 11	@ Brewers	7–0	**Brault** (1–0)	Woodruff (1–2)	—	27,422	68–77	W1
146	September 12	@ Brewers	2–5	Jeffress (4–2)	**Cole** (11–10)	Knebel (35)	30,331	68–78	L1
147	September 13	@ Brewers	2–8	Anderson (10–3)	**Glasnow** (2–7)	—	27,436	68–79	L2
148	September 15	@ Reds	2–4	Bailey (5–8)	**Kuhl** (7–11)	Iglesias (27)	17,625	68–80	L3
149	September 16	@ Reds	1–2	Romano (5–6)	**Nova** (11–14)	Reed (1)	25,685	68–81	L4
150	September 17	@ Reds	2–5	Stephenson (5–5)	**Cole** (11–11)	Lorenzen (2)	22,228	68–82	L5
151	September 18	Brewers	0–3	Suter (3–2)	**Taillon** (7–7)	Knebel (36)	16,283	68–83	L6
152	September 19	Brewers	0–1	Anderson (11–3)	**Williams** (6–9)	Knebel (37)	13,929	68–84	L7
153	September 20	Brewers	6–4	**Rivero** (5–2)	Knebel (1–3)	—	15,747	69–84	W1
154	September 22	Cardinals	3–4	Nicasio (5–5)	**Rivero** (5–3)	—	23,942	69–85	L1
155	September 23	Cardinals	11–6	**Cole** (12–11)	Lynn (11–8)	—	29,672	70–85	W1
156	September 24	Cardinals	4–1	**Taillon** (8–7)	Oh (1–6)	**Rivero** (19)	28,550	71–85	W2
157	September 26	Orioles	10–1	**Williams** (7–9)	Gausman (11–11)	**Brault** (1)	19,318	72–85	W3
158	September 27	Orioles	5–3	**Kuhl** (8–11)	Ynoa (2–3)	**Rivero** (20)	24,779	73–85	W4
159	September 28	@ Nationals	4–5	Doolittle (2–0)	**Hudson** (2–7)	–	26,380	73–86	L1
160	September 29	@ Nationals	1–6	Strasburg (15–4)	**Cole** (12–12)	–	36,339	73–87	L2
161	September 30	@ Nationals	4–1	**Kontos** (3–6)	Kintzler (4–3)	**Rivero** (21)	32,240	74–87	W1
162	October 1	@ Nationals	11–8	**Sánchez** (1–0)	González (15–9)	**Kontos** (1)	35,652	75–87	W2

Legend: = Win = Loss = Postponement
Bold = Pirates team member

• August 20 game vs St. Louis Cardinals to be played at BB&T Ballpark at Historic Bowman Field in Williamsport, Pennsylvania as part of the 2017 MLB Little League Classic.

== Roster ==
2017 Pittsburgh Pirates
Roster
Pitchers: 51 Johnny Barbato; 59 Antonio Bastardo; 53 Joaquín Benoit; 43 Steven Brault; 45 Gerrit Cole; 24 Tyler Glasnow; 41 Daniel Hudson; 70 George Kontos; 39 Chad Kuhl; 52 Jack Leathersich; 38 Wade LeBlanc; 47 Josh Lindblom; 52 Jhan Mariñez; 66 Dovydas Neverauskas; 12 Juan Nicasio; 46 Iván Nova; 48 Dan Runzler; 59 Ángel Sánchez; 37 Edgar Santana; 31 A. J. Schugel; 50 Jameson Taillon; 73 Felipe Vázquez; 44 Tony Watson; 57 Trevor Williams	Catchers: 29 Francisco Cervelli; 32 Elías Díaz; 58 Jacob Stallings; 19 Chris Stewart; Infielders: 55 Josh Bell; 63 Chris Bostick; 23 David Freese; 17 Phil Gosselin; 37 Alen Hanson; 5 Josh Harrison; 10 Jordy Mercer; 62 Max Moroff; 61 Gift Ngoepe; 3 Sean Rodriguez	Outfielders: 26 Adam Frazier; 28 John Jaso; 47 Jordan Luplow; 6 Starling Marté; 22 Andrew McCutchen; 69 Daniel Ortiz; 36,64 José Osuna; 25 Gregory Polanco; Other batters: 64 John Bormann	Manager: 13 Clint Hurdle; Coaches: 86 Heberto Andrade (bullpen catcher); 18 Kimera Bartee (first base); 2 Jeff Branson (hitting); 89 Jordan Comadena (bullpen catcher); 15,3 Joey Cora (third base); 85 Dave Jauss (coach); 75 Jeff Livesey (assistant hitting); 14 Tom Prince (bench); 56 Euclides Rojas (bullpen); 54 Ray Searage (pitching)

== Player stats ==
=== Batting ===
Note: G = Games played; AB = At bats; R = Runs; H = Hits; 2B = Doubles; 3B = Triples; HR = Home runs; RBI = Runs batted in; SB = Stolen bases; BB = Walks; AVG = Batting average; SLG = Slugging average

Player	G	AB	R	H	2B	3B	HR	RBI	SB	BB	AVG	SLG
Andrew McCutchen	156	570	94	159	30	2	28	88	1	73	.279	.486
Josh Bell	159	549	75	140	26	6	26	90	2	66	.255	.466
Jordy Mercer	145	502	52	128	24	5	14	58	0	51	.255	.406
Josh Harrison	128	486	66	132	26	2	16	47	12	28	.272	.432
David Freese	130	426	44	112	16	0	10	52	0	58	.263	.371
Adam Frazier	121	406	55	112	20	6	6	53	9	36	.276	.399
Gregory Polanco	108	379	39	95	20	0	11	35	8	27	.251	.391
Starling Marte	77	309	48	85	7	2	7	31	21	20	.275	.379
Francisco Cervelli	81	265	31	66	13	2	5	31	0	32	.249	.370
John Jaso	126	256	28	54	19	0	10	35	1	40	.211	.402
José Osuna	104	215	31	50	13	4	7	30	0	9	.233	.428
Elías Díaz	64	188	18	42	14	0	1	19	1	11	.223	.314
Chris Stewart	51	131	8	24	1	2	0	4	0	9	.183	.221
Max Moroff	56	120	19	24	4	1	3	21	0	16	.200	.325
Sean Rodriguez	39	95	12	16	1	0	3	5	0	8	.168	.274
Jordan Luplow	27	78	6	16	3	1	3	11	0	6	.205	.385
Alen Hanson	37	57	8	11	0	2	0	1	2	2	.193	.263
Gift Ngoepe	28	54	10	12	2	1	0	6	0	8	.222	.296
Phil Gosselin	28	40	3	6	1	0	0	2	0	2	.150	.175
Christopher Bostick	20	27	6	8	2	0	0	1	0	4	.296	.370
Jacob Stallings	5	14	3	5	2	0	0	3	0	2	.357	.500
Danny Ortiz	9	12	1	1	0	0	0	0	0	1	.083	.083
John Bormann	1	1	0	0	0	0	0	0	0	0	.000	.000
Pitcher totals	162	278	11	33	5	0	1	12	0	10	.119	.147
Team totals	162	5458	668	1331	249	36	151	635	67	519	.244	.386

=== Pitching ===
Note: W = Wins; L = Losses; ERA = Earned run average; G = Games pitched; GS = Games started; SV = Saves; IP = Innings pitched; H = Hits allowed; R = Runs allowed; ER = Earned runs allowed; BB = Walks allowed; SO = Strikeouts

Player	W	L	ERA	G	GS	SV	IP	H	R	ER	BB	SO
Gerrit Cole	12	12	4.26	33	33	0	203.0	199	98	96	55	196
Iván Nova	11	14	4.14	31	31	0	187.0	203	96	86	36	131
Chad Kuhl	8	11	4.35	31	31	0	157.1	159	81	76	72	142
Trevor Williams	7	9	4.07	31	25	0	150.1	145	73	68	52	117
Jameson Taillon	8	7	4.44	25	25	0	133.2	152	69	66	46	125
Felipe Vázquez	5	3	1.67	73	0	21	75.1	47	19	14	20	88
Wade LeBlanc	5	2	4.50	50	0	1	68.0	64	35	34	17	54
Tyler Glasnow	2	7	7.69	15	13	0	62.0	81	61	53	44	56
Daniel Hudson	2	7	4.38	71	0	0	61.2	57	34	30	33	66
Juan Nicasio	2	5	2.85	65	0	2	60.0	49	20	19	18	60
Tony Watson	5	3	3.66	47	0	10	46.2	57	20	19	14	35
Steven Brault	1	0	4.67	11	4	1	34.2	41	21	18	14	23
Jhan Mariñez	0	1	3.18	24	0	0	34.0	34	12	12	12	26
A. J. Schugel	4	0	1.97	32	0	0	32.0	31	8	7	14	27
Johnny Barbato	0	1	4.08	24	0	0	28.2	25	13	13	18	23
Dovydas Neverauskas	1	1	3.91	24	0	0	25.1	24	11	11	8	17
Edgar Santana	0	0	3.50	19	0	0	18.0	16	8	7	12	20
George Kontos	1	1	1.84	15	0	1	14.2	9	3	3	3	15
Ángel Sánchez	1	0	8.76	8	0	0	12.1	16	12	12	1	10
Josh Lindblom	0	0	7.84	4	0	0	10.1	18	9	9	3	10
Antonio Bastardo	0	1	15.00	9	0	0	9.0	16	15	15	9	8
Joaquín Benoit	0	2	7.56	8	0	0	8.1	11	9	7	6	3
Jack Leathersich	0	0	0.00	6	0	0	4.1	3	0	0	2	6
Dan Runzler	0	0	4.50	8	0	0	4.0	7	4	2	2	4
Team totals	75	87	4.22	162	162	36	1440.2	1464	731	676	511	1262

=== Opening Day lineup ===
Opening Day Starters
Name	Position
Adam Frazier	LF
Starling Marte	CF
Andrew McCutchen	RF
Gregory Polanco	DH
David Freese	3B
Francisco Cervelli	C
Josh Bell	1B
Josh Harrison	2B
Jordy Mercer	SS
Gerrit Cole	SP

=== Disabled lists ===
==== 7-day disabled list ====
Player	Injury	Placed	Activated
Francisco Cervelli	Concussion	June 7, 2017	June 14, 2017
Francisco Cervelli	Concussion	June 22, 2017	July 3, 2017

==== 10-day disabled list ====
Player	Injury	Placed	Activated
Adam Frazier	Left Hamstring Strain	April 23, 2017	May 12, 2017
Antonio Bastardo	Left Quad Strain	April 25, 2017	June 27, 2017
David Freese	Right Hamstring Strain	April 26, 2017	May 12, 2017
Jameson Taillon	Groin Discomfort	May 4, 2017	June 12, 2017
Gregory Polanco	Left Hamstring Strain	May 17, 2017	May 25, 2017
Josh Lindblom	Left Side Discomfort	May 20, 2017	June 24, 2017
Chris Stewart	Left Hamstring Strain	May 30, 2017	June 18, 2017
Gregory Polanco	Left Hamstring Strain	July 22, 2017	August 2, 2017
Gregory Polanco	Left Hamstring Strain	August 13, 2017	September 8, 2017
Francisco Cervelli	Left Wrist Inflammation	August 14, 2017	August 25, 2017
Wade LeBlanc	Strained Left Quadriceps	August 18, 2017	September 1, 2017
George Kontos	Right Groin Strain	August 22, 2017	September 7, 2017
Joaquín Benoit	Left Knee Inflammation	August 22, 2017	September 1, 2017
Francisco Cervelli	Strained Left Quadriceps	August 26, 2017	October 2, 2017
Adam Frazier	Right Hamstring Strain	August 28, 2017	September 8, 2017
Josh Harrison	Fractured Left Hand	September 3, 2017	September 10, 2017

==== 60-day disabled list ====
Player	Injury	Placed	Activated
Josh Harrison	Fractured Left Hand	September 10, 2017	November 6, 2017

== Notable achievements ==
=== Awards ===
National League Pitcher of the Month

- Iván Nova (April)

National League Player of the Month

- Andrew McCutchen (June)

2017 Major League Baseball All-Star Game

- Josh Harrison, INF, Reserve

National League Player of the Week

- Andrew McCutchen (September 25-October 1)

== Farm system ==
Level	Team	League	Manager
AAA	Indianapolis Indians	International League	Andy Barkett
AA	Altoona Curve	Eastern League	Michael Ryan
A	Bradenton Marauders	Florida State League	Gera Alvarez
A	West Virginia Power	South Atlantic League	Wyatt Toregas
Short-Season A	West Virginia Black Bears	New York–Penn League	Brian Esposito
Rookie	Bristol Pirates	Appalachian League	Kory DeHaan
Rookie	GCL Pirates	Gulf Coast League	Bob Herold
Rookie	DSL Pirates	Dominican Summer League	Kieran Mattison

LEAGUE CHAMPIONS: Altoona
