= 2017 Milwaukee Brewers season =

2017 Milwaukee Brewers
- League: National League
- Division: Central
- Ballpark: Miller Park
- City: Milwaukee, Wisconsin
- Record: 86–76 (.531)
- Divisional place: 2nd
- Owners: Mark Attanasio
- General managers: David Stearns
- Managers: Craig Counsell
- Television: Fox Sports Wisconsin (Brian Anderson, Bill Schroeder, Craig Coshun, Matt Lepay); Telemundo Wisconsin (Spanish-language coverage, Sunday home games; Hector Molina, Kevin Holden)
- Radio: 620 WTMJ (Bob Uecker, Jeff Levering, Lane Grindle)
- Stats: ESPN.com; Baseball Reference

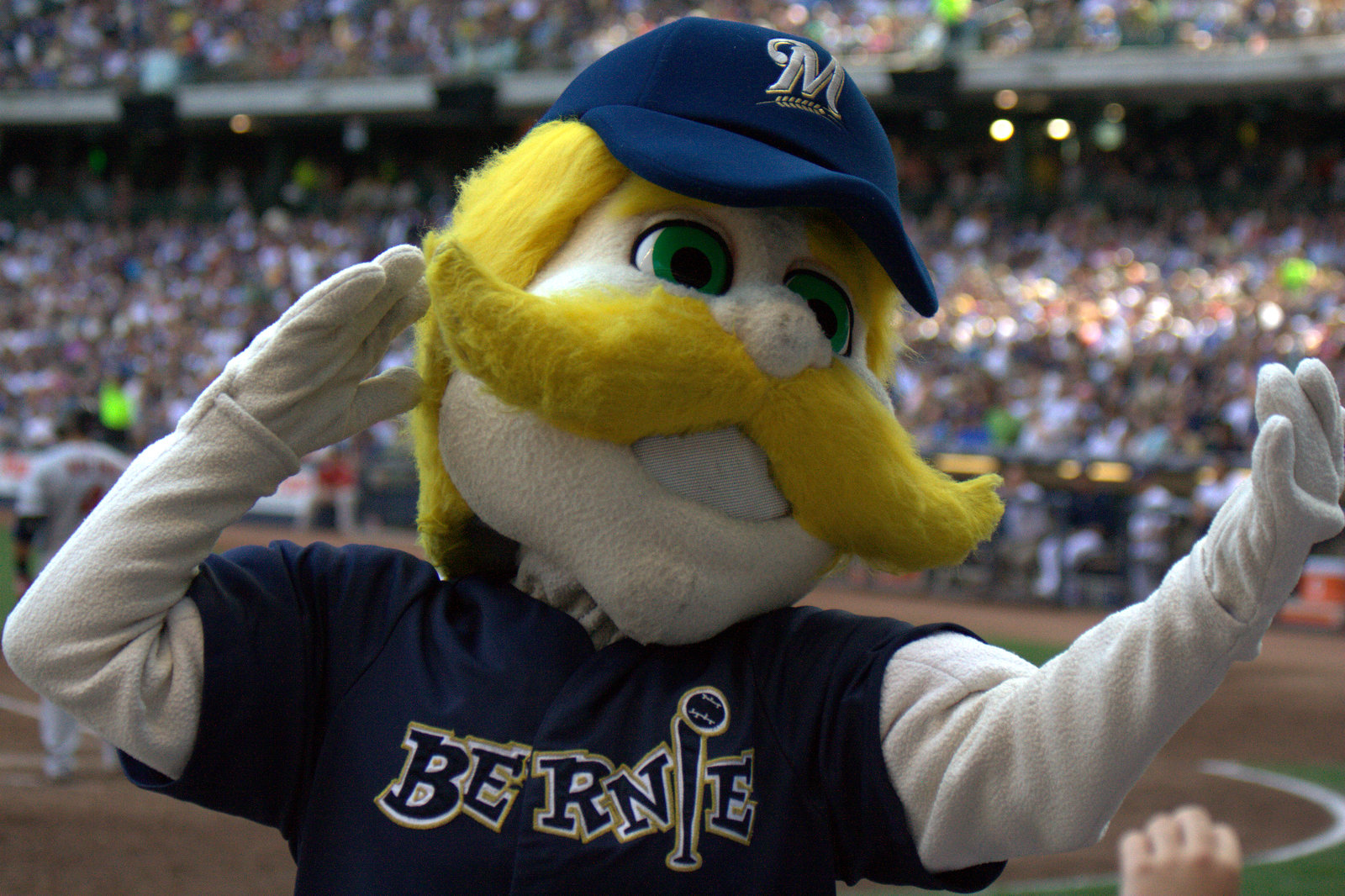
Bernie Brewer embedded in crowd, encouraging fans to make noise.

The 2017 Milwaukee Brewers season was the 48th season for the Brewers in Milwaukee, the 20th in the National League, and 49th overall. The Brewers were managed by Craig Counsell in his third season as manager. They finished the season 86–76 to finish six games behind the Chicago Cubs in the National League Central. The Brewers finished one game behind the Colorado Rockies for the second Wild Card spot. The season marked the first time the Brewers had finished above .500 in three years and their best season in terms of winning percentage since 2011.

== Offseason ==
=== Trades and acquisitions ===
==== November 2016 ====
- November 9, Yhonathan Barrios is signed as a free agent.
- November 23, Blake Parker is claimed off of waivers from the Los Angeles Angels of Anaheim.
- November 28, Steve Geltz is claimed off of waivers from the Tampa Bay Rays.
- November 29, Eric Thames is signed as a free agent.

==== December 2016 ====
- December 6, Tyler Thornburg is traded to the Boston Red Sox in exchange for Mauricio Dubon, Josh Pennington, Travis Shaw, and a player to be named later.
- December 8, Tim Dillard is signed as a free agent.
- December 8, Ryan Webb is signed as a free agent.
- December 12, Ivan De Jesus Jr. is signed as a free agent.
- December 13, Drew Gagnon and Martin Maldonado are traded to the Los Angeles Angels of Anaheim in exchange for Jett Bandy.
- December 14, Tommy Milone is signed as a free agent.
- December 15, Hiram Burgos is signed as a free agent.
- December 15, Andy Oliver is signed as a free agent.
- December 15, Eric Sogard is signed as a free agent.

==== January 2017 ====
- January 9, Cody Decker is signed as a free agent.
- January 19, Neftali Feliz is signed as a free agent.
- January 21, Joba Chamberlain is signed as a free agent.
- January 31, Ehire Adrianza is claimed off of waivers from the San Francisco Giants.

==== February 2017 ====
- February 2, Jesus Aguilar is claimed off of waivers from the Cleveland Indians.
- February 14, Nick Noonan is signed as a free agent.

== Regular season ==
=== Season standings ===
==== National League Central ====
NL Central
Team	W	L	Pct.	GB	Home	Road
Chicago Cubs	92	70	.568	—	48‍–‍33	44‍–‍37
Milwaukee Brewers	86	76	.531	6	46‍–‍38	40‍–‍38
St. Louis Cardinals	83	79	.512	9	44‍–‍37	39‍–‍42
Pittsburgh Pirates	75	87	.463	17	44‍–‍37	31‍–‍50
Cincinnati Reds	68	94	.420	24	39‍–‍42	29‍–‍52

==== National League Wild Card ====
Division leaders
Team	W	L	Pct.
Los Angeles Dodgers	104	58	.642
Washington Nationals	97	65	.599
Chicago Cubs	92	70	.568

Wild Card teams (Top 2 teams qualify for postseason)
Team	W	L	Pct.	GB
Arizona Diamondbacks	93	69	.574	+6
Colorado Rockies	87	75	.537	—
Milwaukee Brewers	86	76	.531	1
St. Louis Cardinals	83	79	.512	4
Miami Marlins	77	85	.475	10
Pittsburgh Pirates	75	87	.463	12
Atlanta Braves	72	90	.444	15
San Diego Padres	71	91	.438	16
New York Mets	70	92	.432	17
Cincinnati Reds	68	94	.420	19
Philadelphia Phillies	66	96	.407	21
San Francisco Giants	64	98	.395	23

==== Record vs. opponents ====
2017 National League record Source: MLB Standings Grid – 2017
Team	AZ	ATL	CHC	CIN	COL	LAD	MIA	MIL	NYM	PHI	PIT	SD	SF	STL	WSH	AL
Arizona	—	2–4	3–3	3–3	11–8	11–8	3–4	4–3	6–1	6–1	4–3	11–8	12–7	3–4	2–4	12–8
Atlanta	4–2	—	1–6	3–3	3–4	3–4	11–8	4–2	7–12	6–13	2–5	5–2	4–3	1–5	9–10	9–11
Chicago	3–3	6–1	—	12–7	2–5	2–4	4–3	10–9	4–2	4–3	10–9	2–4	4–3	14–5	3–4	12–8
Cincinnati	3–3	3–3	7–12	—	3–4	0–6	2–5	8–11	3–4	4–2	13–6	3–4	4–3	9–10	1–6	5–15
Colorado	8–11	4–3	5–2	4–3	—	10–9	2–4	4–3	3–3	5–2	3–3	12–7	12–7	2–4	3–4	10–10
Los Angeles	8–11	4–3	4–2	6–0	9–10	—	6–1	3–3	7–0	4–3	6–1	13–6	11–8	4–3	3–3	16–4
Miami	4–3	8–11	3–4	5–2	4–2	1–6	—	2–4	12–7	8–11	3–4	5–1	5–1	2–5	6–13	9–11
Milwaukee	3–4	2–4	9–10	11–8	3–4	3–3	4–2	—	5–2	3–3	9–10	5–2	3–4	11–8	4–3	11–9
New York	1–6	12–7	2–4	4–3	3–3	0–7	7–12	2–5	—	12–7	3–3	3–4	5–1	3–4	6–13	7–13
Philadelphia	1–6	13–6	3–4	2–4	2–5	3–4	11–8	3–3	7–12	—	2–5	1–5	4–3	1–5	8–11	5–15
Pittsburgh	3–4	5–2	9–10	6–13	3–3	1–6	4–3	10–9	3–3	5–2	—	3–3	1–5	8–11	4–3	10–10
San Diego	8–11	2–5	4–2	4–3	7–12	6–13	1–5	2–5	4–3	5–1	3–3	—	12–7	3–4	2–5	8–12
San Francisco	7–12	3–4	3–4	3–4	7–12	8–11	1–5	4–3	1–5	3–4	5–1	7–12	—	3–4	1–5	8–12
St. Louis	4–3	5–1	5–14	10–9	4–2	3–4	5–2	8–11	4–3	5–1	11–8	4–3	4–3	—	3–3	8–12
Washington	4–2	10–9	4–3	6–1	4–3	3–3	13–6	3–4	13–6	11–8	3–4	5–2	5–1	3–3	—	10–10

=== Game log ===
2017 Brewers Game Log: 86–76 (Home: 44–37; Away: 42–39)
April 13–13 (Home: 7–10; Road 6–3)

#	Date	Opponent	Time	Score	Win	Loss	Save	Record	Attendance	Streak/ Box
1	April 3	Rockies	1:10 pm	5–7	Estévez (1–0)	**Mariñez** (0–1)	Holland (1)	0–1	43,336	L1/Box
2	April 4	Rockies	6:40 pm	5–6	Anderson (1–0)	**Davies** (0–1)	Holland (2)	0–2	21,458	L2/Box
3	April 5	Rockies	7:10 pm	6–1	**Peralta** (1–0)	Chatwood (0–1)	**Feliz** (1)	1–2	21,824	W1/Box
4	April 6	Rockies	12:40 pm	1–2	Dunn (1–0)	**Feliz** (0–1)	Holland (3)	1–3	23,828	L1/Box
5	April 7	Cubs	7:10 pm	2–1 (11)	**Hughes** (1–0)	Montgomery (0–2)	—	2–3	28,728	W1/Box
6	April 8	Cubs	6:10 pm	6–11	Hendricks (1–0)	**Mariñez** (0–2)	—	2–4	43,080	L1/Box
7	April 9	Cubs	1:10 pm	4–7	Arrieta (2–0)	**Davies** (0–2)	—	2–5	38,483	L2/Box
8	April 11	@ Blue Jays	6:07 pm	4–3	**Peralta** (2–0)	Happ (0–2)	**Feliz** (2)	3–5	48,456	W1/Box
9	April 12	@ Blue Jays	6:07 pm	2–0	**Anderson** (1–0)	Stroman (1–1)	**Feliz** (3)	4–5	29,919	W2/Box
10	April 13	@ Reds	6:10 pm	5–1	**Nelson** (1–0)	Arroyo (0–2)	—	5–5	13,574	W3/Box
11	April 14	@ Reds	6:10 pm	10–4	**Milone** (1–0)	Wood (0–1)	—	6–5	23,850	W4/Box
12	April 15	@ Reds	12:10 pm	5–7	Iglesias (1–0)	**Torres** (0–1)	Lorenzen (1)	6–6	31,008	L1/Box
13	April 16	@ Reds	12:10 pm	4–2	**Peralta** (3–0)	Romano (0–1)	**Feliz** (4)	7–6	12,625	W1/Box
14	April 17	@ Cubs	7:05 pm	6–3	**Anderson** (2–0)	Lackey (1–2)	**Feliz** (5)	8–6	38,636	W2/Box
15	April 18	@ Cubs	7:05 pm	7–9	Grimm (1–0)	**Hughes** (1–1)	Davis (3)	8–7	39,026	L1/Box
16	April 19	@ Cubs	1:20 pm	4–7	Davis (2–0)	**Feliz** (0–2)	—	8–8	34,864	L2/Box
17	April 20	Cardinals	7:10 pm	7–5	**Davies** (1–2)	Martínez (0–3)	**Barnes** (1)	9–8	26,451	W1/Box
18	April 21	Cardinals	7:10 pm	3–6	Wainwright (1–3)	**Peralta** (3–1)	Oh (3)	9–9	23,126	L1/Box
19	April 22	Cardinals	6:10 pm	1–4	Lynn (2–1)	**Torres** (0–2)	Oh (4)	9–10	30,865	L2/Box
20	April 23	Cardinals	1:10 pm	4–6	Leake (3–1)	**Nelson** (1–1)	Oh (5)	9–11	31,158	L3/Box
21	April 24	Reds	6:40 pm	11–7	**Torres** (1–2)	Garrett (2–2)	—	10–11	23,943	W1/Box
22	April 25	Reds	6:40 pm	9–1	**Davies** (2–2)	Feldman (1–2)	**Milone** (1)	11–11	28,449	W2/Box
23	April 26	Reds	12:40 pm	9–4	**Peralta** (4–1)	Davis (0–1)	—	12–11	19,062	W3/Box
24	April 28	Braves	7:10 pm	8–10	Ramírez (1–1)	**Feliz** (0–3)	Johnson (4)	12–12	26,453	L1/Box
25	April 29	Braves	6:10 pm	3–11	García (1–1)	**Nelson** (1–2)	—	12–13	30,026	L2/Box
26	April 30	Braves	1:10 pm	4–3	**Garza** (1–0)	Foltynewicz (0–3)	**Feliz** (6)	13–13	24,395	W1/Box

May 15–12 (Home: 7–5; Road: 8–7)

#	Date	Opponent	Time	Score	Win	Loss	Save	Record	Attendance	Streak/ Box
27	May 1	@ Cardinals	7:15 pm	7–5 (10)	**Drake** (1–0)	Oh (1–1)	**Feliz** (7)	14–13	36,339	W2/Box
28	May 2	@ Cardinals	7:15 pm	1–2	Martínez (1–3)	**Peralta** (4–2)	Rosenthal (3)	14–14	38,616	L1/Box
—	May 3	@ Cardinals	7:15 pm	**Postponed (rain)** (Rescheduled for June 13)						
29	May 4	@ Cardinals	6:15 pm	5–4	**Drake** (2–0)	Bowman (1–1)	**Feliz** (8)	15–14	36,250	W1/Box
30	May 5	@ Pirates	6:05 pm	0–4	LeBlanc (2–0)	**Scahill** (0–1)	—	15–15	21,129	L1/Box
31	May 6	@ Pirates	6:05 pm	1–2 (10)	Watson (1–0)	**Torres** (1–3)	—	15–16	22,902	L2/Box
32	May 7	@ Pirates	12:35 pm	6–2	**Davies** (3–2)	Glawnow (1–2)	—	16–16	25,108	W1/Box
33	May 9	Red Sox	6:40 pm	11–7	**Torres** (2–3)	Pomeranz (3–2)	—	17–16	22,524	W2/Box
34	May 10	Red Sox	7:10 pm	7–4	**Scahill** (1–1)	Kendrick (0–2)	—	18–16	23,095	W3/Box
35	May 11	Red Sox	12:10 pm	1–4	Kimbrel (2–0)	**Feliz** (0–4)	—	18–17	26,499	L1/Box
36	May 12	Mets	7:10 pm	7–4	**Garza** (2–0)	Harvey (2–3)	**Hughes** (1)	19–17	28,306	W1/Box
37	May 13	Mets	6:10 pm	11–4	**Davies** (4–2)	Gsellman (2–3)		20–17	33,849	W2/Box
38	May 14	Mets	1:10 pm	11–9	**Feliz** (1–4)	Reed (0–2)	**Knebel** (1)	21–17	30,623	W3/Box
39	May 15	@ Padres	9:10 pm	5–6 (10)	Torres (2–2)	**Drake** (2–1)		21–18	15,866	L1/Box
40	May 16	@ Padres	9:10 pm	6–2	**Nelson** (2–2)	Richard (2–5)		22–18	16,657	W1/Box
41	May 17	@ Padres	9:10 pm	3–1	**Barnes** (1–0)	Maurer (0–3)	**Knebel** (2)	23–18	17,356	W2/Box
42	May 18	@ Padres	2:40 pm	4–2	**Davies** (5–2)	Quackenbush (0–1)	**Knebel** (3)	24–18	14,359	W3/Box
43	May 19	@ Cubs	1:20 pm	6–3	**Peralta** (5–2)	Montgomery (0–3)	**Torres** (1)	25–18	36,923	W4/Box
—	May 20	@ Cubs	1:20 pm	**Postponed (rain)** (Rescheduled for July 6)						
44	May 21	@ Cubs	1:20 pm	6–13	Arrieta (5–3)	**Anderson** (2–1)		25–19	41,671	L1/Box
45	May 23	Blue Jays	6:40 pm	3–4	Barnes (1–2)	**Nelson** (2–3)	Osuna (7)	25–20	30,742	L2/Box
46	May 24	Blue Jays	12:10 pm	4–8	Stroman (5–2)	**Garza** (2–1)		25–21	26,607	L3/Box
47	May 25	Diamondbacks	7:10 pm	0–4	Ray (4–3)	**Davies** (5–3)		25–22	30,081	L4/Box
48	May 26	Diamondbacks	7:10 pm	2–4 (10)	McFarland (2–0)	**Peralta** (5–3)	Rodney (13)	25–23	25,391	L5/Box
49	May 27	Diamondbacks	3:10 pm	6–1	**Anderson** (3–1)	Greinke (6–3)		26–23	29,746	W1/Box
50	May 28	Diamondbacks	1:10 pm	9–5	**Nelson** (3–3)	Corbin (4–5)	**Barnes** (2)	27–23	41,698	W2/Box
51	May 29	@ Mets	3:10 pm	2–4	Gsellman (3–3)	**Garza** (2–2)	Reed (7)	27–24	34,830	L1/Box
52	May 30	@ Mets	6:10 pm	4–5 (12)	Smoker (1–2)	**Peralta** (5–4)		27–25	24,457	L2/Box
53	May 31	@ Mets	6:10 pm	7–1	**Guerra** (1–0)	deGrom (4–2)		28–25	26,517	W1/Box

June 15–14 (Home: 8–7; Road: 7–7)

#	Date	Opponent	Time	Score	Win	Loss	Save	Record	Attendance	Streak/ Box
54	June 1	@ Mets	12:10 pm	2–1	**Anderson** (4–1)	Wheeler (3–3)	**Knebel** (4)	29–25	35,123	W2/Box
55	June 2	Dodgers	7:10 pm	1–2 (12)	Jansen (3–0)	**Feliz** (1–5)		29–26	30,140	L1/Box
56	June 3	Dodgers	3:10 pm	8–10	Morrow (2–0)	**Torres** (2–4)	Jansen (9)	29–27	34,354	L2/Box
57	June 4	Dodgers	1:10 pm	3–0	**Davies** (6–3)	Maeda (4–3)	**Knebel** (5)	30–27	30,330	W1/Box
58	June 5	Giants	6:40 pm	2–7	Samardzija (2–7)	**Scahill** (1–2)		30–28	21,452	L1/Box
59	June 6	Giants	6:40 pm	5–2	**Anderson** (5–1)	Cain (3–5)	**Knebel** (6)	31–28	21,214	W1/Box
60	June 7	Giants	7:10 pm	6–3	**Nelson** (4–3)	Blach (4–3)	**Knebel** (7)	32–28	20,580	W2/Box
61	June 8	Giants	1:10 pm	5–9 (10)	Melancon (1–1)	**Barnes** (1–1)		32–29	23,005	L1/Box
62	June 9	@ Diamondbacks	8:40 pm	8–6	**Davies** (7–3)	McFarland (3–1)	**Knebel** (8)	33–29	25,009	W1/Box
63	June 10	@ Diamondbacks	9:10 pm	2–3	Godley (2–1)	**Guerra** (1–1)	Rodney (16)	33–30	40,195	L1/Box
64	June 11	@ Diamondbacks	3:10 pm	1–11	Ray (7–3)	**Anderson** (5–2)		33–31	30,370	L2/Box
65	June 13	@ Cardinals	1:15 pm	0–6	Lynn (5–3)	**Suter** (0–1)	Lyons (1)	33–32	40,083	L3/Box
66	June 13	@ Cardinals	7:15 pm	8–5	**Hughes** (2–1)	Rosenthal (1–3)	**Knebel** (9)	34–32	40,115	W1/Box
67	June 14	@ Cardinals	7:15 pm	7–6	**Garza** (3–2)	Leake (5–6)	**Knebel** (10)	35–32	38,061	W2/Box
68	June 15	@ Cardinals	6:15 pm	6–4	**Torres** (3–4)	Oh (1–3)	**Drake** (1)	36–32	45,228	W3/Box
69	June 16	Padres	7:10 pm	6–5 (10)	**Hughes** (3–1)	Buchter (3–3)		37–32	31,161	W4/Box
70	June 17	Padres	3:10 pm	5–7 (11)	Torres (4–2)	**Drake** (2–2)	Maton (1)	37–33	34,312	L1/Box
71	June 18	Padres	1:10 pm	2–1	**Nelson** (5–3)	Perdomo (1–4)		38–33	34,518	W1/Box
72	June 19	Pirates	6:40 pm	1–8	Cole (5–6)	**Garza** (3–3)		38–34	25,489	L1/Box
73	June 20	Pirates	6:40 pm	3–7	Kuhl (2–6)	**Davies** (7–4)		38–35	23,982	L2/Box
74	June 21	Pirates	7:10 pm	4–3	**Drake** (3–2)	Hudson (1–3)	**Knebel** (11)	39–35	25,134	W1/Box
75	June 22	Pirates	1:10 pm	4–2	**Anderson** (6–2)	Nova (7–5)	**Knebel** (12)	40–35	28,428	W2/Box
76	June 23	@ Braves	6:35 pm	4–5	Foltynewicz (5–5)	**Nelson** (5–4)	Vizcaíno (1)	40–36	30,521	L1/Box
77	June 24	@ Braves	3:10 pm	1–3	Dickey (6–5)	**Garza** (3–4)	Johnson (15)	40–37	38,463	L2/Box
78	June 25	@ Braves	12:35 pm	7–0	**Davies** (8–4)	Teherán (6–6)		41–37	31,634	W1/Box
79	June 27	@ Reds	6:10 pm	6–8	Adleman (5–4)	**Guerra** (1–2)	Iglesias (13)	41–38	18,577	L1/Box
80	June 28	@ Reds	6:10 pm	3–4	Storen (2–2)	**Knebel** (0–1)	Iglesias (14)	41–39	21,842	L2/Box
81	June 29	@ Reds	6:10 pm	11–3	**Nelson** (6–4)	Bailey (0–2)		42–39	20,419	W1/Box
82	June 30	Marlins	7:10 pm	3–2	**Torres** (4–4)	Phelps (2–4)	**Knebel** (13)	43–39	35,549	W2/Box

July 12–13 (Home: 7–4; Road: 5–9)

#	Date	Opponent	Time	Score	Win	Loss	Save	Record	Attendance	Streak/ Box
83	July 1	Marlins	3:10 pm	8–4	**Davies** (9–4)	Koehler (1–3)		44–39	30,712	W3/Box
84	July 2	Marlins	1:10 pm	3–10	Straily (6–4)	**Guerra** (1–3)		44–40	33,834	L1/Box
85	July 3	Orioles	1:10 pm	8–1	**Suter** (1–1)	Miley (3–7)		45–40	36,457	W1/Box
86	July 4	Orioles	3:10 pm	6–2	**Nelson** (7–4)	Jiménez (3–4)		46–40	31,818	W2/Box
87	July 5	Orioles	7:10 pm	4–0	**Garza** (4–4)	Aquino (1–2)		47–40	27,734	W3/Box
88	July 6	@ Cubs	1:20 pm	11–2	**Davies** (10–4)	Montgomery (1–6)		48–40	41,576	W4/Box
89	July 7	@ Yankees	6:05 pm	9–4	**Hader** (1–0)	Clippard (1–5)		49–40	43,472	W5/Box
90	July 8	@ Yankees	12:05 pm	3–5	Chapman (2–0)	**Knebel** (0–2)		49–41	40,224	L1/Box
91	July 9	@ Yankees	12:05 pm	5–3	**Nelson** (8–4)	Tanaka (7–8)	**Knebel** (14)	50–41	43,952	W1/Box
**88th All-Star Game in Miami, Florida**
92	July 14	Philles	7:10 pm	9–6	**Davies** (11–4)	Pivetta (2–5)	**Knebel** (15)	51–41	41,941	W2/Box
93	July 15	Phillies	6:10 pm	3–2	**Barnes** (2–1)	Benoit (1–4)	**Knebel** (16)	52–41	37,950	W3/Box
94	July 16	Phillies	1:10 pm	2–5	Hellickson (6–5)	**Scahill** (1–3)	Neris (8)	52–42	41,747	L1/Box
95	July 17	@ Pirates	6:05 pm	2–4	Hudson (2–4)	**Hader** (1–1)	Rivero (7)	52–43	18,506	L2/Box
96	July 18	@ Pirates	6:05 pm	3–4	Nova (10–6)	**Drake** (3–3)	Rivero (8)	52–44	20,462	L3/Box
97	July 19	@ Pirates	6:05 pm	2–3 (10)	Watson (5–2)	**Hughes** (3–2)		52–45	24,401	L4/Box
98	July 20	@ Pirates	11:35 am	2–4	Taillon (6–3)	**Nelson** (8–5)	Rivero (9)	52–46	33,493	L5/Box
99	July 21	@ Phillies	6:05 pm	1–6	Nola (7–6)	**Garza** (4–5)		52–47	17,550	L6/Box
100	July 22	@ Phillies	6:05 pm	9–8	**Barnes** (3–1)	Neris (2–4)	**Knebel** (17)	53–47	17,712	W1/Box
101	July 23	@ Phillies	12:35 pm	3–6	Eickhoff (2–7)	**Guerra** (1–4)	García (1)	53–48	21,258	L1/Box
102	July 25	@ Nationals	6:05 pm	8–0	**Davies** (12–4)	Jackson (1–1)		54–48	28,428	W1/Box
103	July 26	@ Nationals	6:05 pm	5–8	Madson (3–4)	**Barnes** (3–2)		54–49	35,296	L1/Box
104	July 27	@ Nationals	11:05 am	2–15	Scherzer (12–5)	**Blazek** (0–1)		54–50	32,118	L2/Box
105	July 28	Cubs	7:10 pm	2–1	**Suter** (2–1)	Quintana (6–9)	**Knebel** (18)	55–50	42,574	W1/Box
106	July 29	Cubs	6:10 pm	1–2 (11)	Montgomery (3–6)	**Hughes** (3–3)	Davis (21)	55–51	44,709	L1/Box
107	July 30	Cubs	1:10 pm	2–4	Lackey (8–9)	**Davies** (12–5)	Davis (22)	55–52	44,269	L2/Box

August 15–12 (Home: 8–5; Road: 7–7)

#	Date	Opponent	Time	Score	Win	Loss	Save	Record	Attendance	Streak/ Box
108	August 1	Cardinals	6:40 pm	3–2	**Nelson** (9–5)	Martínez (7–9)	**Knebel** (19)	56–52	30,150	W1/Box
109	August 2	Cardinals	7:10 pm	4–5	Weaver (1–1)	**Suter** (2–2)	Rosenthal (7)	56–53	34,433	L1/Box
110	August 3	Cardinals	1:10 pm	2–1	**Garza** (5–5)	Cecil (1–4)	**Knebel** (20)	57–53	40,170	W1/Box
111	August 4	@ Rays	6:10 pm	2–0	**Woodruff** (1–0)	Faria (5–2)	**Knebel** (21)	58–53	21,164	W2/Box
112	August 5	@ Rays	5:10 pm	3–0	**Davies** (13–5)	Cobb (9–8)	**Swarzak** (2)	59–53	15,849	W3/Box
113	August 6	@ Rays	12:10 pm	1–2	Hunter (1–2)	**Barnes** (3–3)		59–54	12,129	L1/Box
114	August 7	@ Twins	7:10 pm	4–5	Boshers (1–0)	**Drake** (3–4)	Belisle (2)	59–55	31,339	L2/Box
115	August 8	@ Twins	7:10 pm	4–11	Duffey (1–3)	**Garza** (5–6)	Gee (1)	59–56	34,185	L3/Box
116	August 9	Twins	7:10 pm	0–4	Colón (4–9)	**Woodruff** (1–1)		59–57	30,174	L4/Box
117	August 10	Twins	7:10 pm	2–7	Busenitz (1–0)	**Davies** (13–6)		59–58	33,904	L5/Box
118	August 11	Reds	7:10 pm	10–11	Bailey (4–6)	**Nelson** (9–6)	Iglesias (20)	59–59	34,517	L6/Box
119	August 12	Reds	6:10 pm	6–5 (10)	**Knebel** (1–2)	Adleman (5–10)		60–59	38,256	W1/Box
120	August 13	Reds	1:10 pm	7–4	**Garza** (6–6)	Romano (2–5)	**Knebel** (22)	61–59	43,248	W2/Box
121	August 15	Pirates	6:40 pm	3–1	**Davies** (14–6)	Nova (10–10)	**Knebel** (23)	62–59	32,605	W3/Box
122	August 16	Pirates	1:10 pm	7–6	**Swarzak** (5–3)	Nicasio (1–5)	**Knebel** (24)	63–59	32,439	W4/Box
123	August 18	@ Rockies	7:40 pm	4–8	Márquez (10–5)	**Garza** (6–7)		63–60	32,385	L1/Box
124	August 19	@ Rockies	7:10 pm	6–3	**Swarzak** (6–3)	Holland (2–4)	**Knebel** (25)	64–60	47,216	W1/Box
125	August 20	@ Rockies	2:10 pm	8–4	**Anderson** (7–2)	Freeland (11–8)	**Knebel** (26)	65–60	34,426	W2/Box
126	August 21	@ Giants	9:15 pm	0–2	Stratton (2–2)	**Davies** (14–7)	Dyson (11)	65–61	39,341	L1/Box
127	August 22	@ Giants	9:15 pm	4–3	**Jeffress** (1–0)	Suárez (0–3)	**Knebel** (27)	66–61	39,523	W1/Box
128	August 23	@ Giants	2:45 pm	2–4	Strickland (3–3)	**Barnes** (3–4)	Dyson (12)	66–62	40,015	L1/Box
129	August 25	@ Dodgers	9:10 pm	1–3	Maeda (12–5)	**Anderson** (7–3)	Jansen (35)	66–63	52,455	L2/Box
130	August 26	@ Dodgers	8:10 pm	3–0	**Davies** (15–7)	Ravin (0–1)	**Knebel** (28)	67–63	52,345	W1/Box
131	August 27	@ Dodgers	3:10 pm	3–2	**Nelson** (10–6)	Darvish (8–10)	**Knebel** (29)	68–63	51,355	W2/Box
132	August 29	Cardinals	6:40 pm	2–10	Weaver (3–1)	**Garza** (6–8)		68–64	31,985	L1/Box
133	August 30	Cardinals	1:10 pm	6–5	**Anderson** (8–3)	Martínez (10–10)	**Knebel** (30)	69–64	28,964	W1/Box
134	August 31	Nationals	7:10 pm	6–3	**Davies** (16–7)	González (13–6)	**Knebel** (31)	70–64	26,384	W2/Box

September/October 16–12 (Home: 7–6; Road: 9–6)

#	Date	Opponent	Time	Score	Win	Loss	Save	Record	Attendance	Streak/ Box
135	September 1	Nationals	7:10 pm	1–0	**Nelson** (11–6)	Roark (11–9)	**Knebel** (32)	71–64	40,044	W3/Box
136	September 2	Nationals	6:10 pm	2–3	Madson (5–4)	**Hader** (1–2)	Doolittle (17)	71–65	35,341	L1/Box
137	September 3	Nationals	1:10 pm	7–2	**Jeffress** (3–2)	Jackson (5–4)		72–65	36,937	W1/Box
138	September 4	@ Reds	12:10 pm	4–5	Iglesias (3–2)	**Hader** (1–3)		72–66	22,403	L1/Box
139	September 5	@ Reds	6:10 pm	3–9	Stephenson (4–4)	**Davies** (16–8)	Iglesias (25)	72–67	12,135	L2/Box
140	September 6	@ Reds	11:35 am	1–7	Castillo (3–7)	**Garza** (6–9)		72–68	12,626	L3/Box
141	September 8	@ Cubs	7:05 pm	2–0	**Nelson** (12–6)	Lackey (11–11)	**Knebel** (33)	73–68	41,020	W1/Box
142	September 9	@ Cubs	3:05 pm	15–2	**Anderson** (9–3)	Montgomery (5–8)		74–68	41,167	W2/Box
143	September 10	@ Cubs	1:20 pm	3–1	**Davies** (17–8)	Hendricks (6–5)	**Knebel** (34)	75–68	40,113	W3/Box
144	September 11	Pirates	6:40 pm	0–7	Brault (1–0)	**Woodruff** (1–2)		75–69	27,422	L1/Box
145	September 12	Pirates	6:40 pm	5–2	**Jeffress** (4–2)	Cole (11–10)	**Knebel** (35)	76–69	30,331	W1/Box
146	September 13	Pirates	7:10 pm	8–2	**Anderson** (10–3)	Glasnow (2–7)	—	77–69	27,436	W2/Box
147	September 15	Marlins (Note: Games moved to Miller Park for safety concerns due to Hurricane Irma. These games are recorded in the MLB standings as home games for the Brewers.)	7:10 pm	10–2	**Hughes** (4–3)	Ellington (0–1)	—	78–69	19,369	W3/Box
148	September 16	Marlins	6:10 pm	4–7	Conley (7–7)	**Davies** (17–9)	—	78–70	25,079	L1/Box
149	September 17	Marlins	1:10 pm	10–3	**Woodruff** (2–2)	Peters (0–2)		79–70	24,535	W1/Box
150	September 18	@ Pirates	6:05 pm	3–0	**Suter** (3–2)	Taillon (7–7)	**Knebel** (36)	80–70	16,283	W2/Box
151	September 19	@ Pirates	6:05 pm	1–0	**Anderson** (11–3)	Williams (6–9)	**Knebel** (37)	81–70	13,929	W3/Box
152	September 20	@ Pirates	6:05 pm	4–6	Rivero (5–2)	**Knebel** (1–3)		81–71	15,741	L1/Box
153	September 21	Cubs	7:10 pm	3–5 (10)	Davis (4–1)	**Drake** (3–5)		81–72	35,114	L2/Box
154	September 22	Cubs	6:35 pm	4–5 (10)	Edwards (5–4)	**Knebel** (1–4)		81–73	40,116	L3/Box
155	September 23	Cubs	12:05 pm	4–3 (10)	**Jeffress** (5–2)	Davis (4–2)		82–73	44,067	W1/Box
156	September 24	Cubs	1:10 pm	0–5	Quintana (11–11)	**Anderson** (11–4)		82–74	42,212	L1/Box
157	September 26	Reds	6:40 pm	7–6	**Hader** (2–3)	McGuire (0–1)	**Knebel** (38)	83–74	30,079	W1/Box
158	September 27	Reds	7:10 pm	0–6	Bailey (6–9)	**Woodruff** (2–3)		83–75	34,882	L1/Box
159	September 28	Reds	3:10 pm	4–3	**Hughes** (5–3)	Romano (5–8)	**Knebel** (39)	84–75	30,293	W1/Box
160	September 29	@ Cardinals	7:15 pm	5–3	**Anderson** (12–4)	Gant (0–1)		85–75	44,815	W2/Box
161	September 30	@ Cardinals	3:15 pm	6–7	Sherriff (2–1)	**Swarzak** (6–4)	Nicasio (6)	85–76	42,246	L1/Box
162	October 1	@ Cardinals	2:15 pm	6–1	**Wilkerson** (1–0)	Flaherty (0–2)		86–76	44,787	W1/Box

- Brewers win
- Brewers loss
- Postponement
- Bold: Brewers team member

=== Detailed Records ===
**National League**
Opponent	Home	Away	Total	Pct.	Runs scored	Runs allowed
**NL East**
Atlanta Braves	1–2	1–2	2–4	.333	27	32
Miami Marlins	2–1	2–1	4–2	.667	38	28
New York Mets	3–0	2–2	5–2	.714	44	28
Philadelphia Phillies	2–1	1–2	3–3	.500	27	33
Washington Nationals	3–1	1–2	4–3	.571	31	31
	**11–5**	**7–9**	**18–14**	**.563**	**167**	**152**
**NL Central**
**Milwaukee Brewers**	—	—	—	—	—	—
Chicago Cubs	3–7	6–3	9–10	.474	88	84
Cincinnati Reds	7–2	4–6	11–8	.579	115	97
Pittsburgh Pirates	6–3	3–7	9–10	.474	56	67
St. Louis Cardinals	4–5	7–3	11–8	.579	83	87
	**20–17**	**20–19**	**40–36**	**.526**	**342**	**335**
**NL West**
Arizona Diamondbacks	2–2	1–2	3–4	.429	28	34
Colorado Rockies	1–3	2–1	3–4	.429	35	31
Los Angeles Dodgers	1–2	2–1	3–3	.500	19	17
San Diego Padres	2–1	3–1	5–2	.714	31	24
San Francisco Giants	2–2	1–2	3–4	.429	24	30
	**8–10**	**9–7**	**17–17**	**.500**	**137**	**136**

**American League**
Opponent	Home	Away	Total	Pct.	Runs scored	Runs allowed
Baltimore Orioles	3–0	—	3–0	1.000	18	3
Boston Red Sox	2–1	—	2–1	.667	19	15
Minnesota Twins	0–2	0–2	0–4	.000	10	27
New York Yankees	—	2–1	2–1	.667	17	12
Tampa Bay Rays	—	2–1	2–1	.667	6	2
Toronto Blue Jays	0–2	2–0	2–2	.500	13	15
	**5–5**	**6–4**	**11–9**	**.550**	**83**	**74**

== Roster ==
2017 Milwaukee Brewers
Roster
Pitchers: 57 Chase Anderson; 50 Jacob Barnes; 54 Michael Blazek; 27 Zach Davies; 51 Oliver Drake; 56 Paolo Espino; 37 Neftalí Feliz; 22 Matt Garza; 32 David Goforth; 41 Junior Guerra; 71 Josh Hader; 48 Jared Hughes; 32 Jeremy Jeffress; 26 Taylor Jungmann; 46 Corey Knebel; 28 Jorge López; 53 Jhan Mariñez; 33 Tommy Milone; 52 Jimmy Nelson; 38 Wily Peralta; 58 Rob Scahill; 35 Brent Suter; 37 Anthony Swarzak; 59 Carlos Torres; 58 Wei-Chung Wang; 39 Tyler Webb; 56 Aaron Wilkerson; 45 Taylor Williams; 53 Brandon Woodruff	Catchers: 47 Jett Bandy; 9 Manny Piña; 13 Andrew Susac; 12 Stephen Vogt; Infielders: 24 Jesús Aguilar; 3 Orlando Arcia; 29 Yadiel Rivera; 21 Travis Shaw; 18 Eric Sogard; 7 Eric Thames; 5 Jonathan Villar; 15 Neil Walker	Outfielders: 2 Quintin Berry; 8 Ryan Braun; 20 Lewis Brinson; 23 Keon Broxton; 2 Nick Franklin; 10 Kirk Nieuwenhuis; 14 Hernán Pérez; 33 Brett Phillips; 16 Domingo Santana	Manager: 30 Craig Counsell; Coaches: 11 Darnell Coles (hitting); 63 Robinzon Díaz (bullpen catcher); 55 Marcus Hanel (bullpen catcher); 36 Derek Johnson (pitching); 40 Jason Lane (assistant hitting); 49 Pat Murphy (bench); 6 Ed Sedar (third base); 31 Carlos Subero (first base); 43 Lee Tunnell (bullpen)

== Statistics ==
=== Batting ===
Players in bold are on the active MLB roster as of 2022.

Note: G = Games played; AB = At bats; R = Runs; H = Hits; 2B = Doubles; 3B = Triples; HR = Home runs; RBI = Runs batted in; SB = Stolen bases; BB = Walks; K = Strikeouts; AVG = Batting average; OBP = On-base percentage; SLG = Slugging percentage; TB = Total bases

Player	G	AB	R	H	2B	3B	HR	RBI	SB	BB	K	AVG	OBP	SLG	TB
**Jesús Aguilar**	133	279	40	74	15	2	16	52	0	25	94	.265	.331	.505	141
**Orlando Arcia**	153	506	56	140	17	2	15	53	14	36	100	.277	.321	.407	206
Jett Bandy	60	169	14	35	6	0	6	18	1	15	51	.207	.287	.349	59
Quintin Berry	7	3	0	0	0	0	0	0	2	0	2	.000	.000	.000	0
Ryan Braun	104	380	58	102	28	2	17	52	12	38	76	.268	.336	.487	185
Lewis Brinson	21	47	2	5	0	1	2	3	1	7	17	.106	.236	.277	13
Keon Broxton	143	414	66	91	15	4	20	49	21	40	175	.220	.299	.420	174
Nick Franklin	53	82	7	16	2	1	2	10	2	5	19	.195	.258	.317	26
Kirk Nieuwenhuis	16	26	3	3	1	0	1	1	0	4	15	.115	.258	.269	7
Hernán Pérez	136	432	47	112	19	3	14	51	13	20	79	.259	.289	.414	179
**Brett Phillips**	37	87	9	24	3	0	4	12	5	9	34	.276	.351	.448	39
Manny Piña	107	330	45	92	21	0	9	43	2	20	79	.279	.327	.424	140
Yadiel Rivera	1	2	0	0	0	0	0	0	0	0	1	.000	.000	.000	0
Domingo Santana	151	525	88	146	29	0	30	85	15	73	178	.278	.371	.505	265
**Travis Shaw**	144	538	84	147	34	1	31	101	10	60	138	.273	.349	.513	276
Eric Sogard	94	249	37	68	15	1	3	18	3	48	37	.273	.393	.378	94
Andrew Susac	8	12	0	1	0	0	0	0	0	0	6	.083	.083	.083	1
Eric Thames	138	469	83	116	26	4	31	63	4	75	163	.247	.359	.518	243
**Jonathan Villar**	122	403	49	97	18	1	11	40	23	30	132	.241	.293	.372	150
**Stephen Vogt**	45	122	13	31	7	0	8	20	0	5	25	.254	.281	.508	62
Neil Walker	38	120	19	32	8	0	4	13	0	28	30	.267	.409	.433	52
Pitcher totals	162	272	12	31	3	0	0	11	0	12	120	.114	.157	.125	34
**Team totals**	**162**	**5467**	**732**	**1363**	**267**	**22**	**224**	**695**	**128**	**547**	**1571**	**.249**	**.322**	**.429**	**2346**

=== Pitching ===
Players in bold are on the active MLB roster as of 2022.

Note: W = Wins; L = Losses; ERA = Earned run average; G = Games pitched; GS = Games started; SV = Saves; IP = Innings pitched; H = Hits allowed; R = Runs allowed; ER = Earned runs allowed; HR = Home runs allowed; BB = Walks allowed; K = Strikeouts

Player	W	L	ERA	G	GS	SV	IP	H	R	ER	HR	BB	K
Chase Anderson	12	4	2.74	25	25	0	141.1	113	47	43	14	41	133
**Jacob Barnes**	3	4	4.00	73	0	2	72.0	57	35	32	8	33	80
Michael Blazek	0	1	8.31	5	1	0	8.2	12	9	8	6	1	7
**Zach Davies**	17	9	3.90	33	33	0	191.1	204	90	83	20	55	124
Oliver Drake	3	5	4.44	61	0	1	52.2	57	28	26	6	22	59
**Paolo Espino**	0	0	6.11	6	2	0	17.2	17	13	12	5	5	13
Neftalí Feliz	1	5	6.00	29	0	8	27.0	23	22	18	8	15	21
Matt Garza	6	9	4.94	24	22	0	114.2	121	72	63	17	45	79
David Goforth	0	0	0.00	1	0	0	1.0	0	0	0	0	1	0
Junior Guerra	1	4	5.12	21	14	0	70.1	61	44	40	18	43	67
**Josh Hader**	2	3	2.08	35	0	0	47.2	25	11	11	4	22	68
Jared Hughes	5	3	3.02	67	0	1	59.2	49	21	20	4	24	48
Jeremy Jeffress	4	0	3.65	22	1	0	24.2	24	10	10	2	15	22
Taylor Jungmann	0	0	13.50	1	0	0	0.2	2	1	1	0	1	1
**Corey Knebel**	1	4	1.78	76	0	39	76.0	48	15	15	6	40	126
**Jorge López**	0	0	4.50	1	0	0	2.0	4	1	1	0	1	0
Jhan Mariñez	0	2	5.40	15	0	0	16.2	23	12	10	2	11	14
**Tommy Milone**	1	0	6.43	6	3	1	21.0	29	15	15	6	2	16
Jimmy Nelson	12	6	3.49	29	29	0	175.1	171	75	68	16	48	199
**Wily Peralta**	5	4	7.85	19	8	0	57.1	73	51	50	10	32	52
Hernán Pérez	0	0	0.00	1	0	0	1.0	1	0	0	0	1	0
Rob Scahill	1	3	4.43	18	0	0	22.1	21	14	11	3	10	10
**Brent Suter**	3	2	3.42	22	14	0	81.2	83	33	31	8	22	64
Anthony Swarzak	2	1	2.48	29	0	1	29.0	21	9	8	4	9	39
Carlos Torres	4	4	4.21	67	0	1	72.2	78	37	34	10	33	56
Wei-Chung Wang	0	0	13.50	8	0	0	1.1	5	2	2	1	0	2
Tyler Webb	0	0	9.00	2	0	0	2.0	6	2	2	1	1	3
Aaron Wilkerson	1	0	3.48	3	2	0	10.1	6	4	4	1	1	7
Taylor Williams	0	0	1.93	5	0	0	4.2	4	1	1	0	2	4
**Brandon Woodruff**	2	3	4.81	8	8	0	43.0	43	23	23	5	14	32
**Team totals**	**86**	**76**	**4.00**	**162**	**162**	**54**	**1445.2**	**1381**	**697**	**642**	**185**	**553**	**1346**

== Farm system ==
The Brewers' farm system consisted of eight minor league affiliates in 2017. The Brewers operated a Dominican Summer League team as a co-op with the Cleveland Indians.

Level	Team	League	Manager
Triple-A	Colorado Springs Sky Sox	Pacific Coast League	Rick Sweet
Double-A	Biloxi Shuckers	Southern League	Mike Guerrero
Class A-Advanced	Carolina Mudcats	Carolina League	Joe Ayrault
Class A	Wisconsin Timber Rattlers	Midwest League	Matt Erickson
Rookie	Helena Brewers	Pioneer League	Néstor Corredor
Rookie	AZL Brewers	Arizona League	Rafael Neda
Rookie	DSL Brewers	Dominican Summer League	Victor Estevez
Rookie	DSL Indians/Brewers	Dominican Summer League	Carlos Fermin
