= John Bormann =

American baseball player (born 1993)

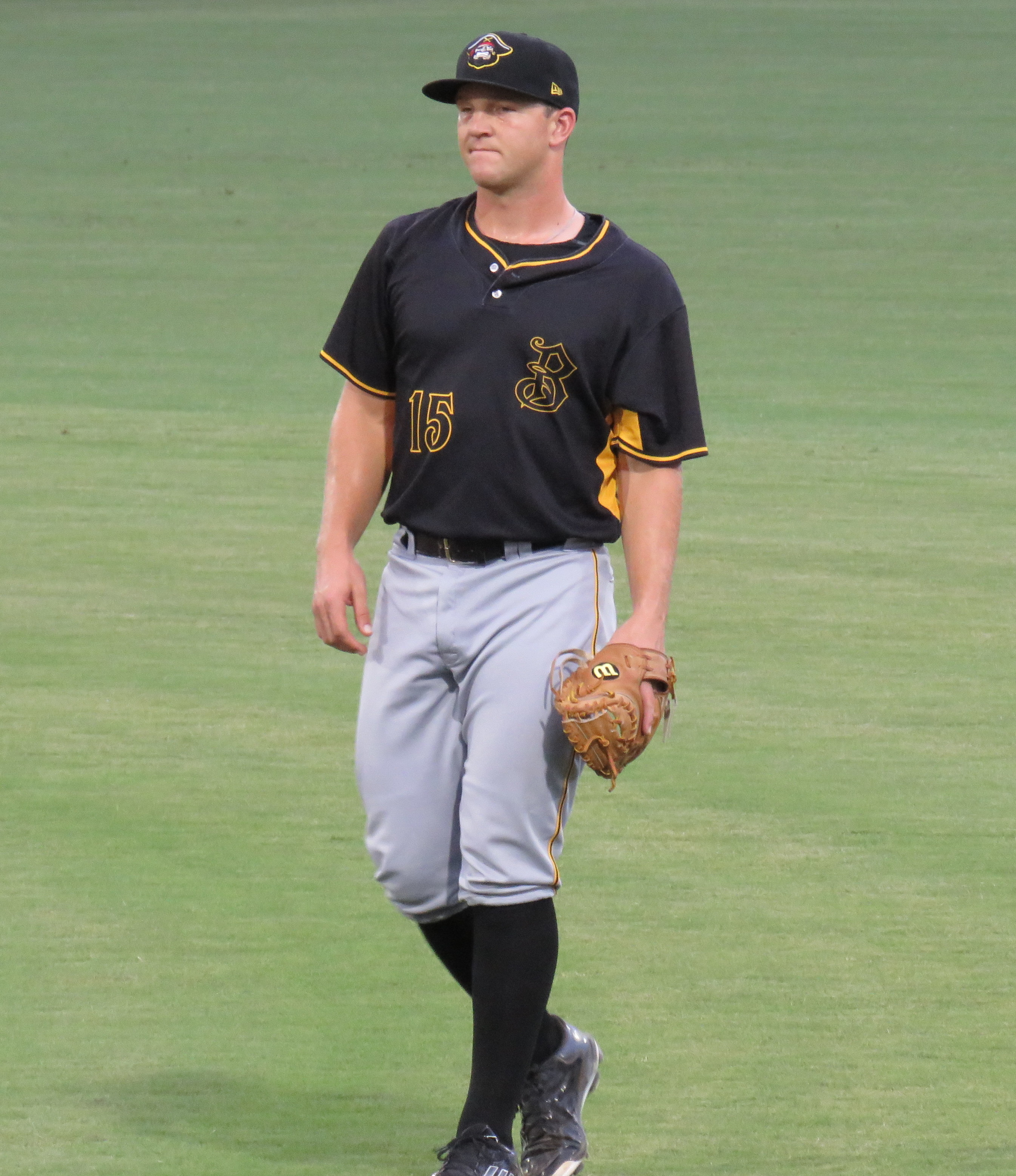
- Bormann in 2018
- Catcher
- Born: April 4, 1993 (age 33); Danville, Virginia, U.S.
- Batted: Right Threw: Right

MLB debut
- April 30, 2017, for the Pittsburgh Pirates

Last MLB appearance
- April 30, 2017, for the Pittsburgh Pirates

MLB statistics
- Batting average: .000
- Home runs: 0
- Runs batted in: 0
- Stats at Baseball Reference

Teams
- Pittsburgh Pirates (2017)

John William Bormann (born April 4, 1993) is an American former professional baseball catcher. He played in Major League Baseball (MLB) in 2017 for the Pittsburgh Pirates.

== Amateur career ==
Bormann attended Navarro High School in Geronimo, Texas. At Navarro, he played as a pitcher and shortstop for the baseball team, and quarterback and safety for the football team. The Seguin Gazette named him their All-Area Player of the Year in football in 2010.

He enrolled at the University of Texas at San Antonio (UTSA), where he played college baseball for the UTSA Roadrunners as a catcher. In 2014, he played collegiate summer baseball with the Wareham Gatemen of the Cape Cod Baseball League. The Los Angeles Angels of Anaheim selected him in the 19th round of the 2014 MLB draft, but he did not sign, returning to UTSA for his senior year later graduating with a degree in Real Estate Finance and Development.

== Professional career ==
The Pittsburgh Pirates selected Bormann in the 24th round (727th overall) of the 2015 Major League Baseball draft. He made his professional debut with the rookie-level Bristol Pirates. Bormann spent the 2016 season with the Single-A West Virginia Power, playing in 52 games and batting .243/.286/.339 with two home runs and 20 RBI.

Bormann played in seven games for the Bradenton Marauders of the High-A Florida State League in 2017, before the Pirates promoted him to the major leagues on April 30, 2017. He made his major league debut that day. Bormann received one at bat for the Pirates before they removed him from the 40-man roster and sent him outright to Bradenton. In his minor league career through 2017, Bormann batted .226/.286/.296 with two home runs and no stolen bases in 399 at-bats.

Bormann split the 2018 campaign between West Virginia, Bradenton, and the Double-A Altoona Curve. He made 31 appearances for the three affiliates, slashing a combined .228/.343/.283 with seven RBI and two stolen bases. Bormann was assigned to High-A Bradenton to start the 2019 season, going 0-for-13 with one walk over five games. He announced his retirement from professional baseball on August 11, 2019.

== Post-baseball career ==
After retiring from baseball, he received a Master of Real Estate degree from Texas A&M University and, beginning in 2021, worked as an analyst at Mason Joseph Company.
