= Carlos Torres (pitcher) =

American baseball player (born 1982)

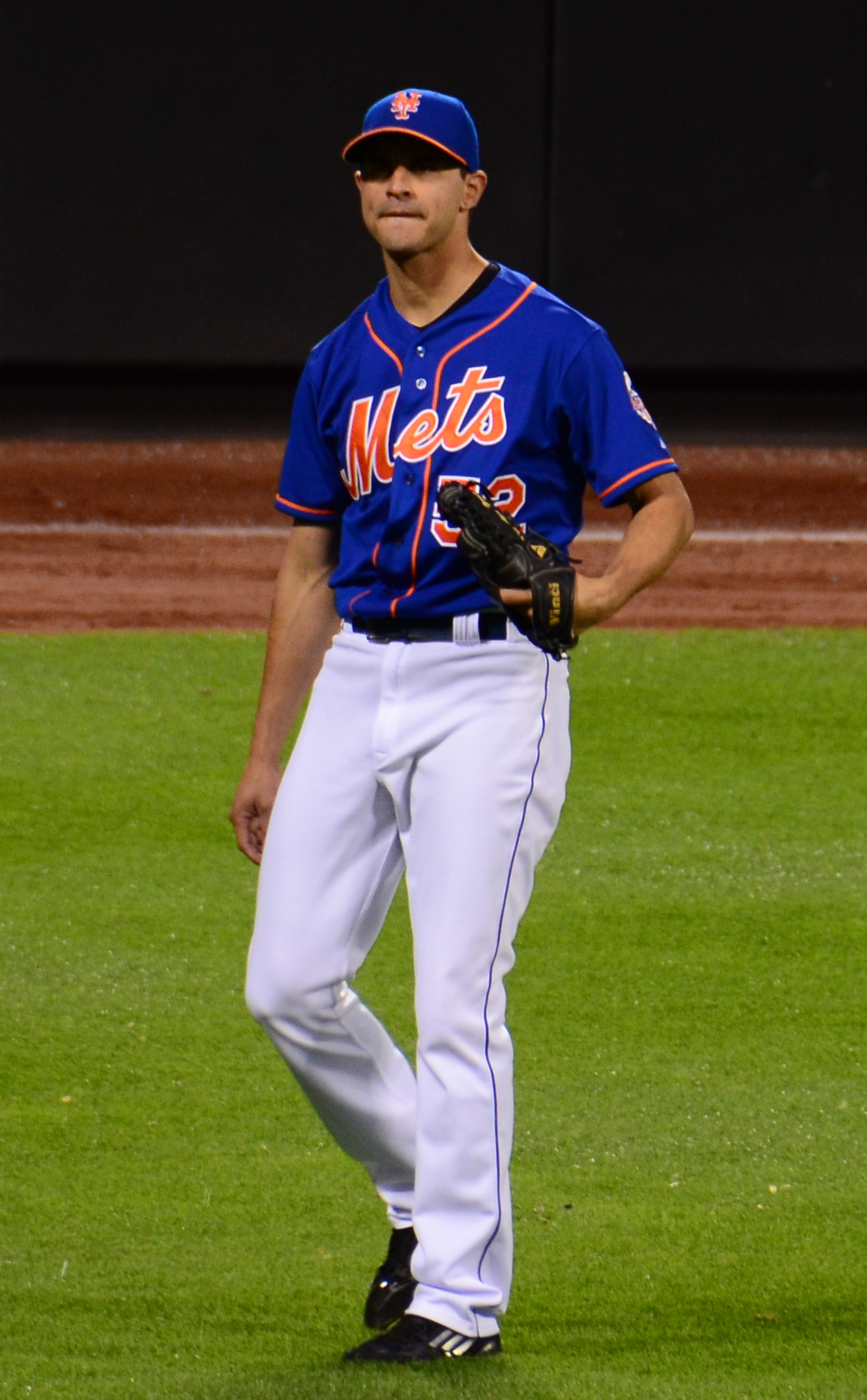
- Torres with the New York Mets in 2013
- Pitcher
- Born: October 22, 1982 (age 43); Santa Cruz, California, U.S.
- Batted: Right Threw: Right

Professional debut
- MLB: July 22, 2009, for the Chicago White Sox
- NPB: April 20, 2011, for the Yomiuri Giants

Last appearance
- MLB: June 16, 2019, for the Detroit Tigers
- NPB: August 11, 2011, for the Yomiuri Giants

MLB statistics
- Win–loss record: 30–31
- Earned run average: 4.09
- Strikeouts: 447

NPB statistics
- Win–loss record: 1–2
- Earned run average: 6.26
- Strikeouts: 19
- Stats at Baseball Reference

Teams
- Chicago White Sox (2009–2010); Yomiuri Giants (2011); Colorado Rockies (2012); New York Mets (2013–2015); Milwaukee Brewers (2016–2017); Washington Nationals (2018); Detroit Tigers (2019)

Carlos Ephriam Torres (born October 22, 1982) is an American former professional baseball pitcher. He played in Major League Baseball (MLB) for the Chicago White Sox, Colorado Rockies, New York Mets, Milwaukee Brewers, Washington Nationals, and Detroit Tigers, and in Nippon Professional Baseball (NPB) for the Yomiuri Giants.

== Early life ==
Carlos Torres was born in Santa Cruz, California after his father, Jose, emigrated from Zacatecas, Mexico. As a child, Torres moved from house to house in Santa Cruz County's "south county" agricultural region where his father looked for work to support his five children. Before focusing on baseball, Torres lettered in four sports (baseball, football, basketball and track and field) at Aptos High School, graduating in 2000. His father encouraged his playing sports in order to keep him active and out of trouble.

== Career ==
=== College ===
Torres first began his collegiate career at Allan Hancock College then moved up north to San Jose City College before transferring to San Jose State University, pitching in 20 games, (starting seven) in 2003. He ultimately transferred to Kansas State University in 2004, pitching in 16 games, (15 starts), compiling an ERA of 4.12.

=== Chicago White Sox ===
Torres was drafted in the 15th round, 449th overall, in the 2004 MLB draft by the Chicago White Sox and signed for $1,000. He worked his way up through the White Sox minor league system, before making his Major League debut on July 22, 2009, against the Tampa Bay Rays. Prior to his call-up Torres had posted an 8–4 record with a 2.20 ERA with the White Sox' Triple-A affiliate, the Charlotte Knights. Scheduled starter John Danks had a blister on his index finger. Torres pitched six strong innings, giving up three runs on two homers and striking out three to record a quality start. On September 3, Torres picked up his first major league victory by defeating Ryan Dempster and the Chicago Cubs 5–0 in a make-up game at Wrigley Field. He was released on October 26, 2010.

=== Yomiuri Giants ===
On November 16, 2010, Torres signed with the Yomiuri Giants of Nippon Professional Baseball. At the beginning of the season, Torres was expected to compete for a place in the starting rotation. He earned his first Nippon Professional Baseball win on July 28, 2011, against the Yokohama BayStars. He became a free agent following the season.

=== Colorado Rockies ===
On January 11, 2012, Torres signed a minor league contract with the Colorado Rockies. He had his contract selected to the major league roster on May 4. On August 12, 2012, Torres got his first career base hit, an RBI single off George Kontos of the San Francisco Giants. He was sent outright off the major league roster and he subsequently elected free agency on November 2.

=== New York Mets ===
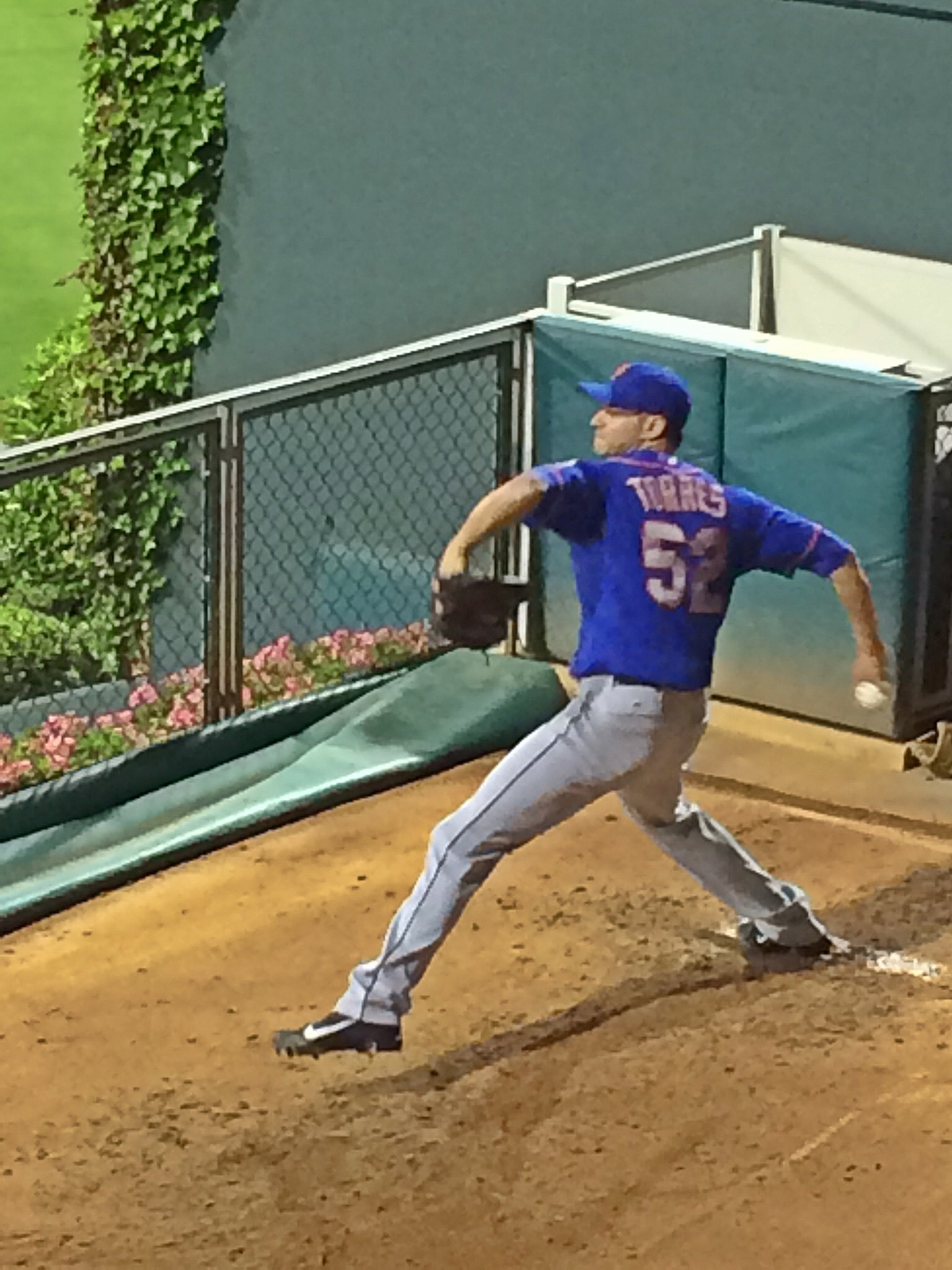
Torres warming up in the bullpen

On November 15, 2012, Torres signed a minor league contract with the New York Mets He had his contract selected to the major league roster on June 16, 2013. In 33 games for the team, Torres compiled 86.1 IP, 4–6, 3.44 ERA, 75 K's, and 1.12 WHIP. During the 2014 season, Torres appeared in a career-high 73 games, while compiling a record of 8–6, 3.06 ERA, 96 K's and 1.31 WHIP in 97.0 IP.

For the 2015 season, Torres appeared in 59 games, while compiling a record of 5–6, 4.68 ERA, 48 K's and 1.37 WHIP in 57.2 IP.

On January 22, 2016, Torres was designated for assignment by the Mets. On January 30, the Mets placed Torres on waivers. Torres cleared waivers on the next day and elected free agency.

=== Milwaukee Brewers ===
On February 19, 2016, Torres signed a minor league contract with the Atlanta Braves. He was released on March 31, 2016.

On April 2, 2016, Torres signed a one-year major league deal with the Milwaukee Brewers. He was outrighted to AAA and elected free agency on November 2, 2017.

=== Washington Nationals ===
On February 22, 2018, Torres signed a minor league contract with the Cleveland Indians. The deal included an invitation to the Indians' major league spring training camp. Torres was released by the Indians on March 24, 2018.

On March 30, 2018, Torres signed a minor league deal with the Washington Nationals, who assigned him to the Syracuse Chiefs in the Class AAA International League. He appeared in four games for the Chiefs, pitching five scoreless innings. On April 20, 2018, the Nationals selected his contract from Syracuse and placed him on their 25-man roster. He appeared in 10 games for the Nationals, pitching to a 6.52 ERA over 9 2/3 innings. The Nationals designated him for assignment on May 23, he cleared waivers and was sent outright to Triple-A Syracuse Chiefs on May 25. He declared free agency on October 2, 2018.

=== San Diego Padres ===
On January 24, 2019, Torres signed a minor league contract with the San Diego Padres that included an invitation to spring training. On May 16, 2019, he opted out of his contract and became a free agent.

=== Detroit Tigers ===
On May 26, 2019, Torres signed a minor league contract with the Detroit Tigers. On June 8, 2019, Torres was recalled by the Tigers. He was designated for assignment on June 22 after recording a 7.50 ERA in four appearances. Torres later elected free agency on June 24.

=== Minnesota Twins ===
On June 26, 2019, Torres signed a minor league contract with the Minnesota Twins. He was subsequently assigned to the Triple–A Rochester Red Wings. On July 24, the Twins selected Torres' contract, adding him to their active roster. He did not make an appearance for Minnesota, and was designated for assignment on July 28. Torres cleared waivers and was sent outright to Rochester on July 30, but rejected the assignment and elected free agency.

=== San Francisco Giants ===
On August 11, 2019, Torres signed a minor league contract with the San Francisco Giants. In 4 games (3 starts) for the Triple–A Sacramento River Cats, he struggled to a 9.64 ERA with 12 strikeouts across 14 innings pitched. Torres was released by the Giants organization on August 27.

=== Toros de Tijuana ===
On February 26, 2020, Torres signed with the Toros de Tijuana of the Mexican League. In 2020, he did not play a game because of the cancellation of the Mexican League season due to the COVID-19 pandemic. After the 2020 season, he played for Tomateros de Culiacán of the Mexican Pacific League (LVMP). He also played for Mexico in the 2021 Caribbean Series.

Torres made 16 appearances for Tijuana in 2021, compiling a 1–0 record and 1.71 ERA with 27 strikeouts across 21 innings of relief.

On December 9, 2022, Torres retired from professional baseball.
