= Rob Scahill =

American baseball player (born 1987)

- Pitcher
- Born: February 15, 1987 (age 39); Winfield, Illinois, U.S.
- Batted: Left Threw: Right

MLB debut
- September 11, 2012, for the Colorado Rockies

Last MLB appearance
- September 28, 2018, for the Chicago White Sox

MLB statistics
- Win–loss record: 5–7
- Earned run average: 3.85
- Strikeouts: 99
- Stats at Baseball Reference

Teams
- Colorado Rockies (2012–2014); Pittsburgh Pirates (2015–2016); Milwaukee Brewers (2016–2017); Chicago White Sox (2018)

Robert Joseph Scahill (born February 15, 1987) is an American former professional baseball pitcher. He played in Major League Baseball (MLB) for the Colorado Rockies, Pittsburgh Pirates, Milwaukee Brewers, and Chicago White Sox.

== Career ==
=== Colorado Rockies ===
Scahill attended Willowbrook High School in Villa Park, Illinois, and Bradley University, where he played college baseball for the Bradley Braves. The New York Yankees selected Scahill in the 48th round of the 2008 Major League Baseball draft, but he did not sign, and returned to Bradley for his senior year. He was then drafted by the Colorado Rockies in the ninth round (241st overall) of the 2009 Major League Baseball draft.

On September 6, 2012, Scahill was selected to the 40-man roster and promoted to the major leagues for the first time. In six appearances for Colorado during his rookie campaign, Scahill recorded a 1.04 ERA with four strikeouts across 8 2/3 innings pitched.

Scahill made 23 appearances for Colorado during the 2013 campaign, registering a 1-0 record and 5.13 ERA with 20 strikeouts across 33 1/3 innings pitched. He pitched in 12 games for the Rockies in 2014, logging a 1-0 record and 4.80 ERA with 11 strikeouts over 15 innings of work.

=== Pittsburgh Pirates ===
On November 11, 2014, Scahill was traded to the Pittsburgh Pirates in exchange for Shane Carle. He made 28 appearances for Pittsburgh during the 2015 season, compiling a 2-4 record and 2.64 ERA with 24 strikeouts across 30 2/3 innings pitched.

Scahill pitched in 15 games for the Pirates to begin the 2016 season, recording a 4.41 ERA with 13 strikeouts over 16 1/3 innings of work.

=== Milwaukee Brewers ===
On July 12, 2016, Scahill was claimed off waivers by the Milwaukee Brewers and optioned to the Colorado Springs Sky Sox of the Triple–A Pacific Coast League. In 16 appearances down the stretch for Milwaukee, he pitched to a 2.45 ERA with 14 strikeouts across 18 1/3 innings pitched.

Scahill was designated for assignment by the Brewers on January 31, 2017, following the waiver claim of Ehire Adrianza. He cleared waivers and was sent outright to Triple-A Colorado Springs on February 6. On May 1, the Brewers purchased Scahill's contract, adding him to their active roster. He was designated for assignment again following the promotion of Brandon Woodruff on June 13. On June 30, Milwaukee added Scahill back to their active roster. In 18 total appearances for the Brewers, he compiled a 1-3 record and 4.43 ERA with 10 strikeouts across 22 1/3 innings pitched. Scahill was designated for assignment for a third time on July 23. He elected free agency on October 6.

=== Chicago White Sox ===
On December 1, 2017, Scahill signed a minor league contract with the Chicago White Sox. He began the season with the Triple–A Charlotte Knights, and was promoted to the major leagues on September 8, 2018. In six appearances for the White Sox, Scahill logged a 5.40 ERA with three strikeouts across five innings pitched. On October 26, he was removed from the 40–man roster and sent outright to Triple–A.

=== Chicago Cubs ===
On January 18, 2019, Scahill signed a minor league deal with the Chicago Cubs. He was released on March 9, 2019.
