= Zach Davies =

American baseball player (born 1993)

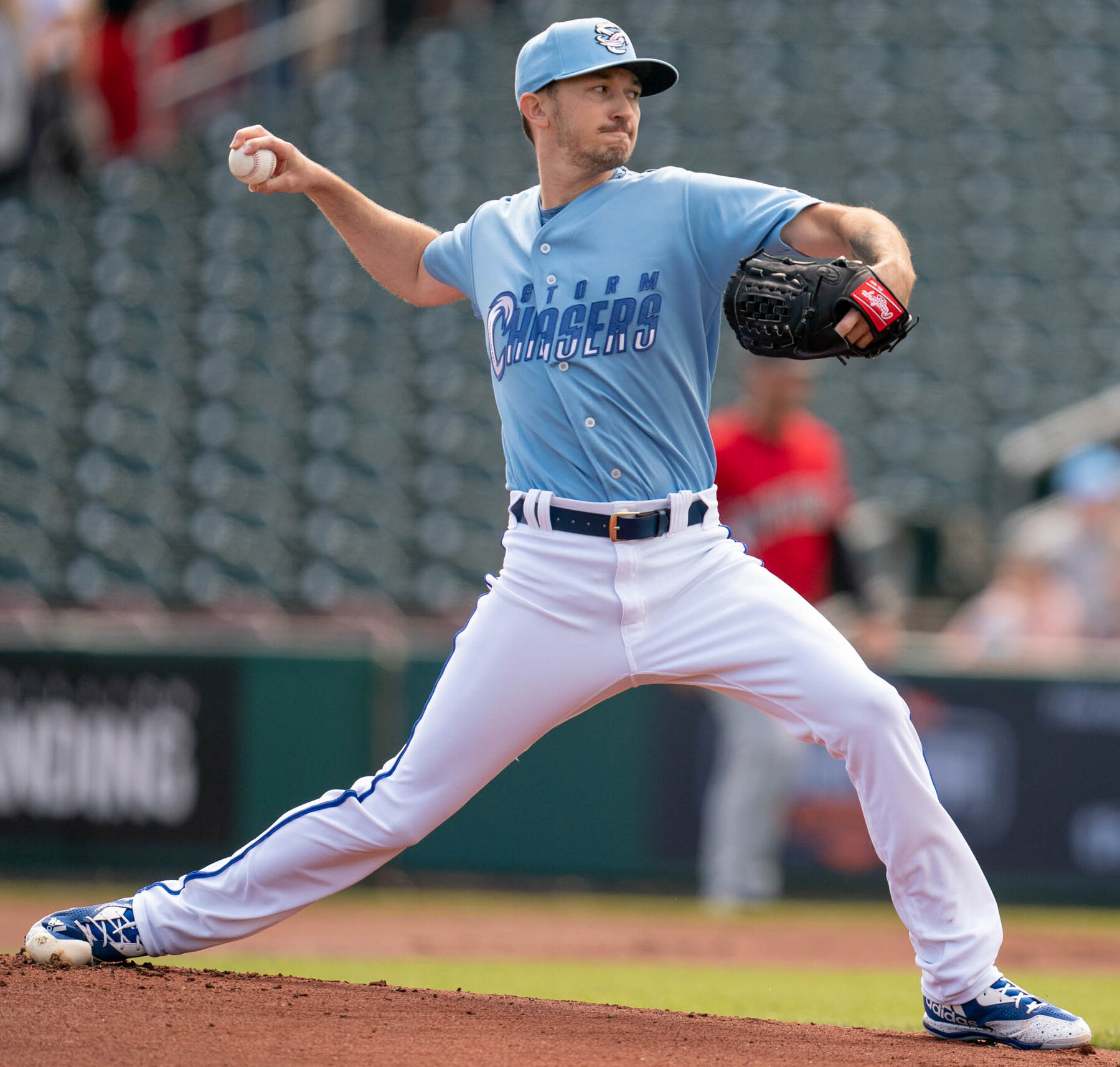
- Davies with the Omaha Storm Chasers in 2024
- Pitcher
- Born: February 7, 1993 (age 33); Puyallup, Washington, U.S.
- Batted: Right Threw: Right

MLB debut
- September 2, 2015, for the Milwaukee Brewers

Last MLB appearance
- September 26, 2023, for the Arizona Diamondbacks

MLB statistics
- Win–loss record: 60–58
- Earned run average: 4.36
- Strikeouts: 785
- Stats at Baseball Reference

Teams
- Milwaukee Brewers (2015–2019); San Diego Padres (2020); Chicago Cubs (2021); Arizona Diamondbacks (2022–2023)

Career highlights and awards
- Pitched a combined no-hitter on June 24, 2021

Zachary Ryan Davies (born February 7, 1993) is an American former professional baseball pitcher. He played in Major League Baseball (MLB) for the Milwaukee Brewers, San Diego Padres, Chicago Cubs, and Arizona Diamondbacks.

The Baltimore Orioles selected Davies in the 26th round of the 2011 MLB draft. Davies appeared in the All-Star Futures Game in 2015, and later that year was traded to the Brewers. He made his MLB debut for Milwaukee in 2015, and was traded to the Padres after the 2019 season. The Padres traded Davies to the Cubs after the 2020 season.

== Amateur career ==
Davies grew up near Seattle before moving to Arizona when he was seven, where he attended Mesquite High School, in Gilbert, Arizona. He played for the school's baseball team initially as a middle infielder, becoming a pitcher in his junior year.

== Professional career ==
=== Baltimore Orioles ===
The Baltimore Orioles selected Davies in the 26th round of the 2011 MLB draft. Davies signed with the Orioles, forgoing his commitment to Arizona State University for a $575,000 signing bonus.

Davies made his professional debut with the Delmarva Shorebirds of the Single–A South Atlantic League in 2012, where he pitched to a 3.86 earned run average (ERA). He had a 3.69 ERA for the Frederick Keys of the High–A Carolina League in 2013. In 2014, he pitched for the Bowie Baysox of the Double–A Eastern League. For Bowie, Davies pitched to a 3.35 ERA. He represented the Orioles in the Arizona Fall League after the regular season. Davies began the 2015 season with the Norfolk Tides of the Triple–A International League, and was chosen to represent the Orioles at the 2015 All-Star Futures Game. With Norfolk, Davies pitched to a 2.84 ERA in 19 games.

=== Milwaukee Brewers ===
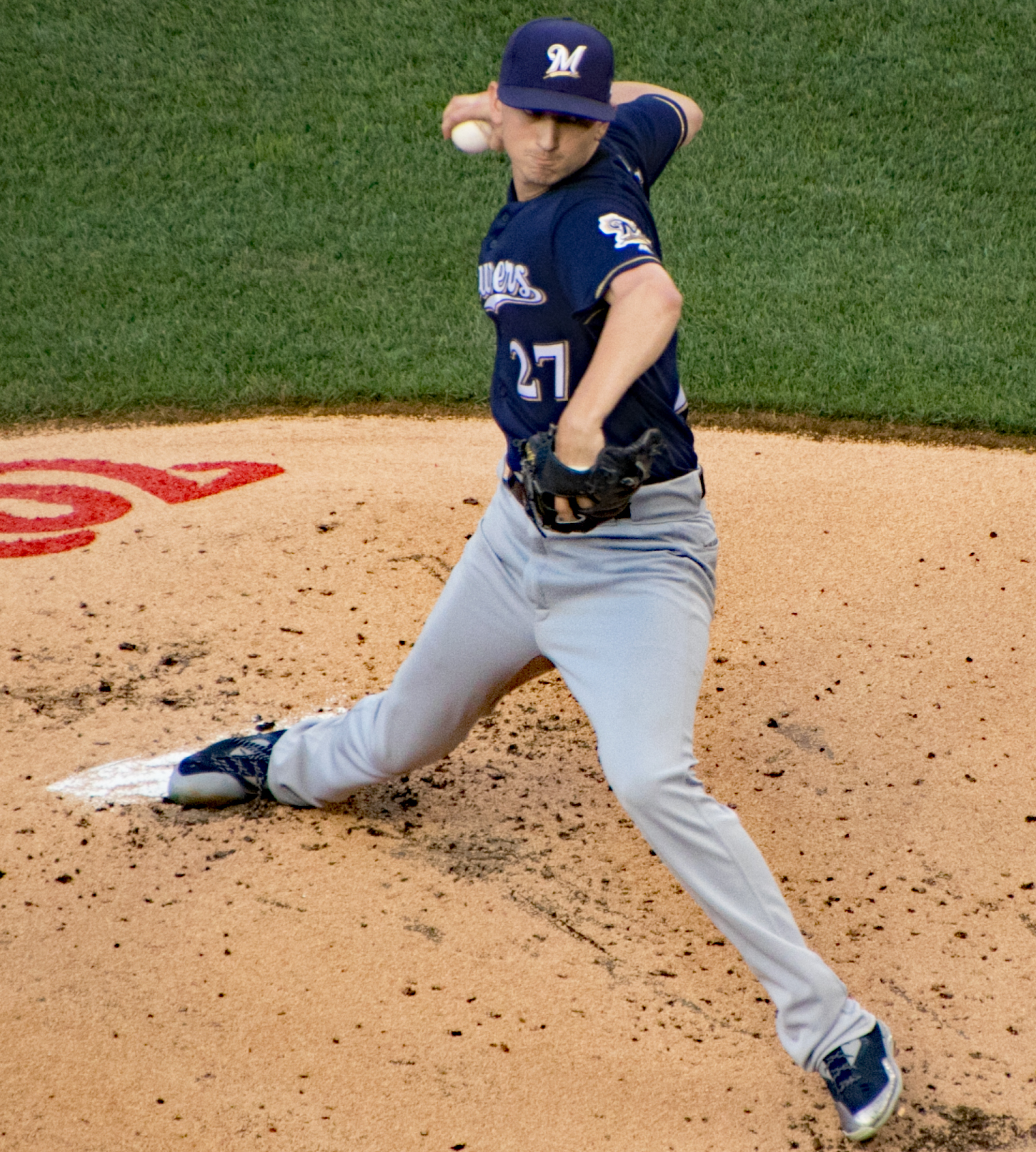
Davis pitching for the Milwaukee Brewers

On July 31, 2015, the Orioles traded Davies to the Milwaukee Brewers for Gerardo Parra. The Brewers assigned Davies to the Colorado Springs Sky Sox of the Triple–A Pacific Coast League, with whom he was 1–2 with a 5.00 ERA, and promoted him to make his major league debut on September 2. In 2016 with Milwaukee, Davies pitched to a 3.97 ERA in 28 games. In 2017, Davies was 17-9 and carried a 3.90 ERA in 33 games. He tied Zack Greinke in wins for second-most in the NL, behind the 18 wins of league leader Clayton Kershaw.

In 2018, Davies pitched in 13 games for the Brewers, and was 2–7 with a 4.77 ERA, as with three minor league teams he was 2–4 with a 4.40 ERA. In 2019, Davies had a 3.55 ERA in 31 games for Milwaukee.

=== San Diego Padres ===
On November 27, 2019, the Brewers traded Davies, Trent Grisham, and cash considerations or a player to be named later to the San Diego Padres in exchange for Luis Urías and Eric Lauer.

In 2020, Davies was 7–4 with a 2.73 ERA. He once again finished with second-most wins in the NL, this time tying with Max Fried behind the 8 wins of league leader Yu Darvish.

=== Chicago Cubs ===
On December 29, 2020, the Padres traded Davies, Owen Caissie, Reginald Preciado, Yeison Santana, and Ismael Mena to the Chicago Cubs in exchange for pitcher Yu Darvish and catcher Víctor Caratini. On June 24, 2021, Davies pitched a combined no-hitter against the Los Angeles Dodgers along with Ryan Tepera, Andrew Chafin, and Craig Kimbrel. He was named a finalist for the 2021 NL Gold Glove Award at pitcher, but it was won by Max Fried. Davies elected free agency following the season.

=== Arizona Diamondbacks ===
On March 24, 2022, Davies signed a one-year, $1.75 million contract with a mutual option with the Arizona Diamondbacks. In 27 starts for the Diamondbacks, he compiled a 4.09 ERA with 102 strikeouts across 134 1/3 innings pitched. On November 7, Davies declined his mutual option with Arizona and became a free agent.

On January 11, 2023, Davies re-signed with the Diamondbacks on a one-year, $5 million contract. In 18 starts for Arizona, he struggled to a 2–5 record and 7.00 ERA with 72 strikeouts in 82 1/3 innings pitched. On September 27, Davies was designated for assignment by the Diamondbacks. He was released on September 29.

=== Kansas City Royals ===
On February 16, 2024, Davies signed a minor league contract with the Washington Nationals. He was released on March 22 when he didn't make the team's Opening Day roster.

On April 8, 2024, Davies signed a minor league contract with the Kansas City Royals. In five starts for the Triple–A Omaha Storm Chasers, he compiled a 4.29 ERA with 12 strikeouts across 21 innings of work. On May 21, Davies was released by the Royals organization.

== Personal life ==
Davies married Megan White on December 3, 2016. They were divorced in May 2022.

Awards and achievements
Preceded by Corey Kluber	No-hit game June 24, 2021 (with Tepera, Chafin & Kimbrel)	Succeeded by Tyler Gilbert
