= Jared Hughes =

American baseball player (born 1985)

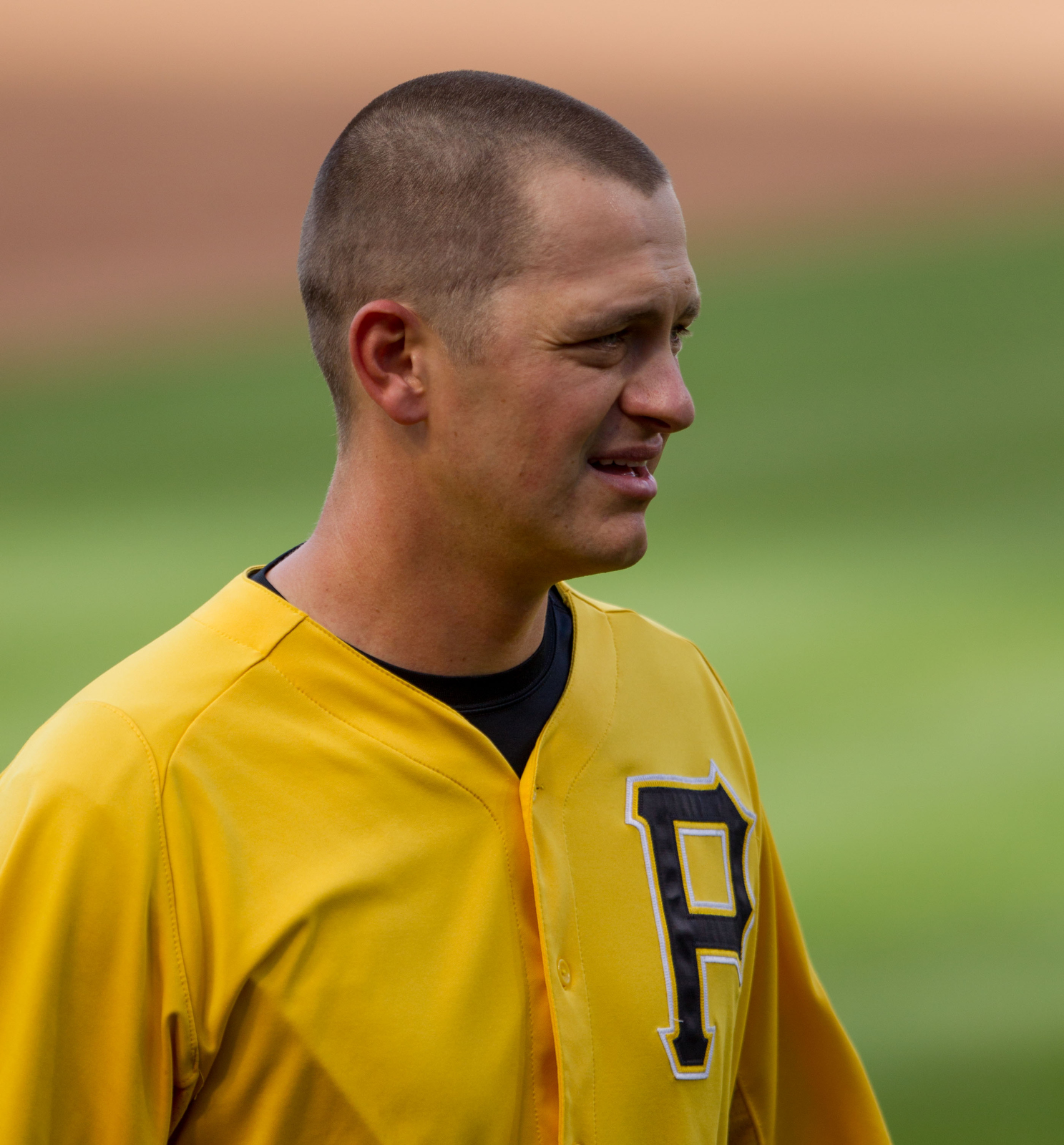
- Hughes with the Pittsburgh Pirates
- Pitcher
- Born: July 4, 1985 (age 41); Stamford, Connecticut, U.S.
- Batted: Right Threw: Right

MLB debut
- September 7, 2011, for the Pittsburgh Pirates

Last MLB appearance
- September 27, 2020, for the New York Mets

MLB statistics
- Win–loss record: 30–26
- Earned run average: 2.96
- Strikeouts: 371
- Stats at Baseball Reference

Teams
- Pittsburgh Pirates (2011–2016); Milwaukee Brewers (2017); Cincinnati Reds (2018–2019); Philadelphia Phillies (2019); New York Mets (2020)

William Jared Hughes (born July 4, 1985) is an American former professional baseball relief pitcher. He made his Major League Baseball (MLB) debut in 2011 with the Pittsburgh Pirates. He also played for the Milwaukee Brewers, Cincinnati Reds, Philadelphia Phillies, and New York Mets.

== Amateur career ==
Born in Stamford, Connecticut, Hughes was raised in San Marino, California and attended Santa Margarita Catholic High School. He was drafted by the Tampa Bay Devil Rays in the 16th round of the 2003 Major League Baseball draft, but chose to attend Santa Clara University. After the 2004 season, Hughes transferred to California State University, Long Beach, where he was a starting pitcher for two seasons in 2005 and 2006 and posted a 16–7 record with a 3.29 earned run average (ERA), pitching 197 innings with 164 strikeouts. In 2005, he played collegiate summer baseball for the Chatham A's of the Cape Cod Baseball League and was named a league all-star.

== Professional career ==
=== Pittsburgh Pirates ===
Hughes was drafted by the Pittsburgh Pirates in the fourth round of the 2006 Major League Baseball draft. He started his professional career as a starting pitcher in 2006 with the Williamsport Crosscutters and the Hickory Crawdads. He spent the 2007 season with Hickory, where he was 8–9 with a 4.64 ERA, and led the league with 27 wild pitches in 145 1/3 innings.

He spent the 2008 season with the Lynchburg Hillcats and the Altoona Curve. He led the league in wild pitches. In 2009, Hughes pitched for the Gulf Coast League Pirates and Altoona, and was a combined 1–6 with three saves and an ERA of 3.61.

In 2010, Hughes pitched for Altoona, and was Pitcher of the Week in the Eastern League on May 17. For the season he was 12–8, and his 12 wins tied for the second-most in the league, were the third-most in a season in club history, and tied for first among all Pittsburgh minor leaguers. He also led the league in wild pitches, with 15 in 150 2/3 innings. Hughes started the 2011 season in the Altoona rotation, but was promoted and moved to the bullpen with the Triple-A League Indianapolis Indians. Between the two teams in 2011, he was 6–5 with a 3.28 ERA in 48 games (11 starts) covering 104 1/3 innings.

When Hughes was promoted to the majors in September 2011, he became the 41st major leaguer in Long Beach history. He appeared in 12 games, going 0–1 with a 4.09 ERA.

On April 25, 2012, Hughes was recalled from Triple-A League Indianapolis. A day later he was optioned back but recalled again on May 1. On August 12, Hughes was optioned back to Indianapolis to make room for Juan Cruz coming off the disabled list. He was recalled again on August 14. Hughes finished the season with 66 appearances, going 2–2 with two saves and a 2.85 ERA. He led National League rookie relief pitchers in ERA, and was second in both games and innings pitched.

The 2013 season was a setback for Hughes, as he battled injuries and inconsistency throughout the year, with a 2–3 record in 29 appearances and a 4.78 ERA. As a result, he also spent time in the Triple-A League again, pitching in 18 games, with a record of 1–0 with two saves and an ERA of 0.43 in 21 innings.

In 2014 Hughes pitched in 63 games and posted a 7–5 record, with a 1.96 ERA. In 64 1/3 innings, he allowed 51 hits and 1.09 walks plus hits per inning pitched.

The 2015 season was another successful one for Hughes, as he put together a 3–1 record in a career-high 76 games (5th in the National League), with a 2.28 ERA and 1.33 walks plus hits per inning pitched.

In 2016, he was 1–1 with one save and had an ERA of 3.03 in 67 games for the Pirates. In 59 1/3 innings, he struck out 34 batters.

Hughes was released on March 29, 2017.

=== Milwaukee Brewers ===
On April 2, 2017, Hughes signed a one-year contract with the Milwaukee Brewers. He made 53 appearances for the Brewers, posting a 5–3 record and 3.02 ERA with 48 strikeouts and one save across 59 2/3 innings pitched. On December 1, Hughes was non-tendered by Milwaukee, making him a free agent.

=== Cincinnati Reds ===
On December 26, 2017, Hughes signed a two-year contract with the Cincinnati Reds, with a $3 million club option or a $250,000 buyout for 2020. In his first season in Cincinnati, in 2018 Hughes posted a career-low 1.94 ERA (fourth-best in the majors among pitchers who threw at least 78 innings) and 1.017 walks plus hits per inning pitched during 72 appearances covering 78 2/3 innings. He finished 4–3 with 7 saves.

In the seven seasons from 2012 to 2018, his 2.66 ERA ranked fourth-best among major league relief pitchers who made at least 440 appearances, behind only Craig Kimbrel (1.94), Kenley Jansen (2.21), and Tony Watson (2.56), and among relievers he tied for second with 65 batters grounding into 65 double plays, behind Brad Ziegler (86), tied with Jim Johnson (65), and 10th with a ground ball rate of 62.0%.

In the first part of 2019, before he was put on waivers, Hughes was 3–4 with one save and a 4.10 ERA in 47 appearances covering 48 1/3 innings.

=== Philadelphia Phillies ===
On August 15, 2019, Hughes was claimed off waivers by the Philadelphia Phillies. On August 17 Hughes made his debut against the San Diego Padres. In 2019 for the Phillies, he was 2–1 with a 3.91 ERA in 25 relief appearances covering 23 innings. As of 2019 he had the best range factor per 9 innings of active pitchers, at 2.69. He became a free agent following the season.

=== Houston Astros ===
On February 17, 2020, the Astros signed Hughes to a minor league contract. He was released on March 19.

=== New York Mets ===
On June 30, 2020, Hughes signed with the New York Mets. He appeared as a relief pitcher in 18 games for them, winning one and losing two, striking out 21 batters in 22 1/3 innings. He became a free agent again after the season ended.

On February 14, 2021, Hughes announced his retirement from professional baseball after 10 major league seasons.

== Executive career ==
In 2021, after his retirement from playing professional baseball, Hughes was hired as an analyst by the Los Angeles Angels. As of 2024, he serves as the coordinator of pitching analysis for the Angels.

== Personal life ==
Hughes is married to Kelly Hughes. They married in 2011. The couple have a son, William, who was born in 2016. Hughes is a Christian.

Throughout his professional career, Hughes gained notoriety for sprinting from the bullpen to the mound when relief pitching. The tradition inspired a meme, when Phillies catcher J.T. Realmuto was recorded shaking his head after Hughes was called into the game, although Realmuto has since gone on the record to say that the .gif of the moment was not him reacting to Hughes's sprint but rather the previous at-bat when the New York Mets scored two runs. Hughes said he started sprinting to the mound in 2011 as a minor leaguer; the first time he did it, "I was out of breath," he said, but "then I started grunting and throwing as hard as I could. Even though I was in the low 90s, it was just way different and it felt good.”
