= Sal Romano =

American baseball player (born 1993)

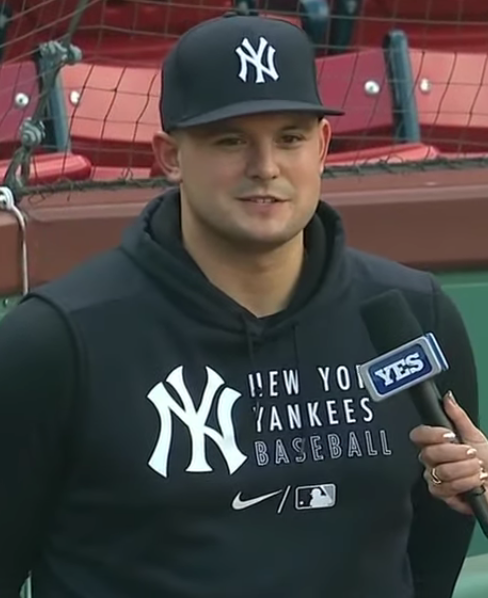
- Romano with the New York Yankees in 2021

Long Island Ducks – No. 30
- Pitcher
- Born: October 12, 1993 (age 32); Syosset, New York, U.S.
- Bats: Left Throws: Right

MLB debut
- April 16, 2017, for the Cincinnati Reds

MLB statistics (through 2021 season)
- Win–loss record: 15–21
- Earned run average: 5.23
- Strikeouts: 211
- Stats at Baseball Reference

Teams
- Cincinnati Reds (2017–2021); New York Yankees (2021); Milwaukee Brewers (2021); New York Yankees (2021)

Salvatore J. Romano (born October 12, 1993) is an American professional baseball pitcher for the Long Island Ducks of the Atlantic League of Professional Baseball. He has previously played in Major League Baseball (MLB) for the Cincinnati Reds, Milwaukee Brewers, and New York Yankees.

== Early life ==
Romano was born in Syosset, New York, and raised in Southington, Connecticut. He attended Southington High School and played for the school's baseball team. He was the Gatorade State Player of the Year in 2011, his senior year.

== Career ==
=== Cincinnati Reds ===
The Cincinnati Reds selected Romano in the 23rd round of the 2011 Major League Baseball draft. He signed with the Reds rather than play college baseball for the University of Tennessee. He had moved to Knoxville, Tennessee, and taken two courses before he signed with the Reds just before the August 17 signing deadline.

After signing, Romano made his professional debut with the Billings Mustangs and he spent the whole season there, going 5–6 with a 5.32 ERA in 15 starts. He spent 2013 with the Dayton Dragons where he compiled a 7–11 record and 4.86 ERA in 15 starts, and he returned there in 2014, going 8–11 with a 4.12 ERA in 28 starts. He spent 2015 with the Daytona Tortugas and Pensacola Blue Wahoos, compiling a combined 6–9 record and 4.82 ERA in 26 games (25 starts). After the season, the Reds added him to their 40-man roster. In 2016, Romano returned to Pensacola where he pitched to a 6–11 record with a 3.52 ERA and 1.22 WHIP in 27 starts.

Romano began the 2017 season with the Louisville Bats. He was recalled to the Reds on April 16 and he made his major league debut that same day. Romano was sent back down to Louisville two days later. He was recalled from Louisville multiple times during the season before being recalled for the last time on July 18. In ten starts for Louisville he was 1–4 with a 3.47 ERA, and in 16 starts for Cincinnati, he compiled a 5–8 record and 4.45 ERA.

Romano began 2018 as a member of Cincinnati's starting rotation. He ended the season with a record of 8–11 and a 5.31 ERA in 39 games (25 starts). Romano began 2019 as a relief pitcher with Louisville. On July 22, Romano was recalled back to Cincinnati. The next day, Romano would pitch three innings while giving up only three hits and one earned run and recorded two strikeouts en route to recording a save in a win over the Milwaukee Brewers.

Romano was designated for assignment by the Reds on February 5, 2020. On September 13, 2020, Romano was added to the Reds’ active roster. He pitched 1.1 shutout innings in 2020. After recording a 5.23 ERA in 14 appearances, Romano was again designated for assignment on May 14, 2021. On May 17, Romano cleared waivers and elected free agency.

=== New York Yankees ===
On May 19, 2021, Romano signed a minor league contract with the New York Yankees organization. Romano recorded a 3.63 ERA in 17 games with the Triple-A Scranton/Wilkes-Barre RailRiders before he was released on July 18. Romano re-signed with the Yankees organization on a new minor league contract the same day. The Yankees selected Romano's contract to the major league roster on July 22. In two appearances for the Yankees, Romano pitched 2 1/3 scoreless innings with three strikeouts. On July 31, Romano was designated for assignment by the Yankees.

=== Milwaukee Brewers ===
Romano was claimed off waivers by the Milwaukee Brewers on August 3, 2021. In 1 inning pitched for the Brewers, Romano gave up 3 runs. On August 10, 2021, Romano was designated for assignment by the Brewers. On August 13, Romano elected free agency.

=== New York Yankees (second stint) ===
On August 14, 2021, Romano signed a minor league contract to return to the New York Yankees. He was assigned to Triple-A Scranton. The Yankees selected his contract on September 8, and he made 1 appearance, getting 2 outs while giving up 1 run. On September 10, the Yankees designated Romano for assignment. On September 13, Romano cleared waivers, but rejected his outright assignment, making him a free agent. The next day, Romano re-signed a major league contract with the Yankees. Romano once again only made 1 appearance for the Yankees, getting 1 out and giving up 1 run. After being injured and placed on the 10-day IL, the Yankees released Romano on September 20.

=== Seattle Mariners ===
On March 22, 2022, Romano signed a minor league contract with the Seattle Mariners. On April 4, Romano retired from professional baseball.

=== Gastonia Honey Hunters ===
On April 12, 2023, Romano came out of retirement to sign with the Gastonia Honey Hunters of the Atlantic League of Professional Baseball. In 28 games (15 starts), he logged a 4.91 ERA with 75 strikeouts across 84 1/3 innings pitched. Romano became a free agent following the season.

=== Boston Red Sox ===
On April 26, 2024, Romano signed a minor league contract with the Boston Red Sox. In 15 games for the Triple–A Worcester Red Sox, he struggled to a 9.24 ERA with 15 strikeouts across 25 1/3 innings pitched. Romano was released by the Red Sox organization on July 13.

=== Long Island Ducks ===
On July 26, 2024, Romano signed with the Long Island Ducks of the Atlantic League of Professional Baseball. In 8 games (6 starts) for Long Island, he compiled a 2–1 record and 4.72 ERA with 25 strikeouts across 34 1/3 innings pitched. Romano became a free agent following the season.

=== Guerreros de Oaxaca ===
On March 5, 2025, Romano signed with the Guerreros de Oaxaca of the Mexican League. In eight starts for Oaxaca, he struggled to a 1-4 record and 6.89 ERA with 14 strikeouts across 31 1/3 innings pitched. Romano was released by the Guerreros on July 3.

=== Long Island Ducks (second stint) ===
On July 15, 2025, Romano signed with the Long Island Ducks of the Atlantic League of Professional Baseball. He made 20 appearances for the Ducks, compiling a 1–1 record and 2.25 ERA with 20 strikeouts over 20 innings of relief.

On May 4, 2026, Romano re-signed with Long Island.
