= 2017 Atlanta Braves season =

2017 Atlanta Braves
- League: National League
- Division: East
- Ballpark: SunTrust Park
- City: Atlanta
- Record: 72–90 (.444)
- Divisional place: 3rd
- Owners: Liberty Media/John Malone
- General managers: John Coppolella
- Managers: Brian Snitker
- Television: Fox Sports Southeast; Fox Sports South (Chip Caray, Joe Simpson, Tom Glavine, Dale Murphy, Jeff Francoeur)
- Radio: 680 The Fan; Rock 100.5; Atlanta Braves Radio Network (Jim Powell, Don Sutton, Mark Lemke)

The 2017 Atlanta Braves season was the Braves' 52nd season in Atlanta and 147th overall. This was the Braves' first season at SunTrust Park, after playing the previous 20 seasons at Turner Field. The Braves began the season on April 3 at Citi Field against the New York Mets and finished the season on October 1 against the Miami Marlins at Marlins Park. The Braves improve on their 68–93 record from 2016. On September 22, 2017, the Braves were eliminated from postseason play. They finished the season 72–90 to finish in third place in the National League East, 25 games behind the Washington Nationals. They failed to make the playoffs for the fourth consecutive season.

This was the last time the Braves missed the playoffs and finished with a losing record until the 2025 season.

== Offseason ==
=== October ===
The Braves made a number of changes during the offseason, starting with releasing Roger McDowell, who served as pitching coach for 11 seasons, on October 7, 2016. Four days later, Brian Snitker, who took over as interim manager for Fredi Gonzalez on May 17, 2016 and the team finished the season with a 59–65 record, including winning 20 of its last 30 games, was named as the new manager of the Atlanta Braves.

=== November ===
On November 10, the Braves signed a two–year, $8 million deal with veteran pitcher and 2012 National League Cy Young Award winner R. A. Dickey. The next day, they signed a one–year, $12.5 million deal with veteran pitcher Bartolo Colón. On November 28, the Braves acquired outfield prospect Alex Jackson and a player to be named at a later date in a trade with the Mariners. In exchange, the Braves sent pitcher Rob Whalen, who went 1–2 with a 6.57 ERA in five starts, and Max Povse to the Mariners.

=== December ===
The Braves continued their offseason realignment of their starting rotation in a December 1 trade acquisition of Jaime García, sending John Gant, who went 1–4 with a 5.76 ERA in 20 games (including seven starts), and two minor league prospects to the Cardinals. The next day, they signed one–year deals with catcher Anthony Recker and relief pitcher Paco Rodriguez, while releasing reliever Chris Withrow. On December 4, the team signed a one–year deal with pitching prospect Jacob Lindgren.

=== January ===
On January 11, the Braves traded Shae Simmons and Mallex Smith to the Mariners in exchange for two left-handed pitching prospects. On January 30, the Braves signed a one–year, $1.5 million contract with veteran catcher Kurt Suzuki.

=== February ===
On February 12, the Braves acquired Brandon Phillips in a trade that sent left-handed pitcher Andrew McKirahan and minor league right-hander Carlos Portuondo to the Reds.

== Spring training ==
The Braves recorded a 9–22 win–loss record in pre-season spring training, excluding two tie games that did not count toward the standings. Their .290 winning percentage was the worst among MLB teams in pre-season.

== Regular season ==
=== Season standings ===
==== National League East ====
NL East
Team	W	L	Pct.	GB	Home	Road
Washington Nationals	97	65	.599	—	47‍–‍34	50‍–‍31
Miami Marlins	77	85	.475	20	42‍–‍36	35‍–‍49
Atlanta Braves	72	90	.444	25	37‍–‍44	35‍–‍46
New York Mets	70	92	.432	27	37‍–‍44	33‍–‍48
Philadelphia Phillies	66	96	.407	31	39‍–‍42	27‍–‍54

==== National League Wild Card ====
Division leaders
Team	W	L	Pct.
Los Angeles Dodgers	104	58	.642
Washington Nationals	97	65	.599
Chicago Cubs	92	70	.568

Wild Card teams (Top 2 teams qualify for postseason)
Team	W	L	Pct.	GB
Arizona Diamondbacks	93	69	.574	+6
Colorado Rockies	87	75	.537	—
Milwaukee Brewers	86	76	.531	1
St. Louis Cardinals	83	79	.512	4
Miami Marlins	77	85	.475	10
Pittsburgh Pirates	75	87	.463	12
Atlanta Braves	72	90	.444	15
San Diego Padres	71	91	.438	16
New York Mets	70	92	.432	17
Cincinnati Reds	68	94	.420	19
Philadelphia Phillies	66	96	.407	21
San Francisco Giants	64	98	.395	23

==== Record vs. opponents ====
2017 National League record Source: MLB Standings Grid – 2017
Team	AZ	ATL	CHC	CIN	COL	LAD	MIA	MIL	NYM	PHI	PIT	SD	SF	STL	WSH	AL
Arizona	—	2–4	3–3	3–3	11–8	11–8	3–4	4–3	6–1	6–1	4–3	11–8	12–7	3–4	2–4	12–8
Atlanta	4–2	—	1–6	3–3	3–4	3–4	11–8	4–2	7–12	6–13	2–5	5–2	4–3	1–5	9–10	9–11
Chicago	3–3	6–1	—	12–7	2–5	2–4	4–3	10–9	4–2	4–3	10–9	2–4	4–3	14–5	3–4	12–8
Cincinnati	3–3	3–3	7–12	—	3–4	0–6	2–5	8–11	3–4	4–2	13–6	3–4	4–3	9–10	1–6	5–15
Colorado	8–11	4–3	5–2	4–3	—	10–9	2–4	4–3	3–3	5–2	3–3	12–7	12–7	2–4	3–4	10–10
Los Angeles	8–11	4–3	4–2	6–0	9–10	—	6–1	3–3	7–0	4–3	6–1	13–6	11–8	4–3	3–3	16–4
Miami	4–3	8–11	3–4	5–2	4–2	1–6	—	2–4	12–7	8–11	3–4	5–1	5–1	2–5	6–13	9–11
Milwaukee	3–4	2–4	9–10	11–8	3–4	3–3	4–2	—	5–2	3–3	9–10	5–2	3–4	11–8	4–3	11–9
New York	1–6	12–7	2–4	4–3	3–3	0–7	7–12	2–5	—	12–7	3–3	3–4	5–1	3–4	6–13	7–13
Philadelphia	1–6	13–6	3–4	2–4	2–5	3–4	11–8	3–3	7–12	—	2–5	1–5	4–3	1–5	8–11	5–15
Pittsburgh	3–4	5–2	9–10	6–13	3–3	1–6	4–3	10–9	3–3	5–2	—	3–3	1–5	8–11	4–3	10–10
San Diego	8–11	2–5	4–2	4–3	7–12	6–13	1–5	2–5	4–3	5–1	3–3	—	12–7	3–4	2–5	8–12
San Francisco	7–12	3–4	3–4	3–4	7–12	8–11	1–5	4–3	1–5	3–4	5–1	7–12	—	3–4	1–5	8–12
St. Louis	4–3	5–1	5–14	10–9	4–2	3–4	5–2	8–11	4–3	5–1	11–8	4–3	4–3	—	3–3	8–12
Washington	4–2	10–9	4–3	6–1	4–3	3–3	13–6	3–4	13–6	11–8	3–4	5–2	5–1	3–3	—	10–10

=== Season summary ===
==== April ====
Opening Day for the Braves on April 3 started with Julio Teherán pitching six scoreless innings, only surrendering four hits, but ended with the New York Mets scoring six runs in a five-walk seventh inning against the relievers of Ian Krol, Chaz Roe and Eric O'Flaherty and the Braves lost 6-0 to the Mets. In the second game of the series two nights later, Matt Kemp hit a go-ahead two-run double in the 12th inning to lift the Braves to a 3-1 victory over the Mets. In the final game of the series, Matt Kemp's two home runs couldn't lift the Braves past Travis d'Arnaud's two-run double and a two-run homer by Wilmer Flores in a 6-2 loss to the Mets.

The Braves made a late rally with three runs in the eighth, two off a hit single to center field by Brandon Phillips, but fell one run short in a 5-4 loss to the Pittsburgh Pirates on April 7. R. A. Dickey's debut with the Braves the following night, which included a two-run single to shallow right, was marred by two errors and surrendering six runs, three earned, in a 6-4 loss. In the final game of the series, the Braves pulled to a two-run lead, surrendered two unearned runs in the fourth inning, pulled ahead to a 4-2 lead with homers by Freddie Freeman in the fifth and seventh and allowed a third unearned run in the eighth. In the ninth, Jim Johnson loaded the bases for Francisco Cervelli, who hit a groundball to left side of infield and allowed Gregory Polanco to score the tying run. The Braves retook the lead with an RBI groundout by Tyler Flowers in the top of the 10th, but Starling Marte completed the sweep of the Braves with a two-run walk-off homer in the bottom of the inning to hand the Braves a 6-5 loss.

Bartolo Colón put the Braves in a six-run hole after three innings and only put up four runs in an 8-4 loss to the Miami Marlins on April 11. The next night, Ender Inciarte of the Braves and Giancarlo Stanton of the Marlins matched each other for home runs, with two, but it was Flowers who hit the winning go-ahead homer to snap the Braves five-game losing skid and defeat the Marlins 5-4.

Inciarte recorded the first hit and home run to highlight a 5-2 Braves victory over the San Diego Padres in the first official game at SunTrust Park on April 14. The next night, back-to-back homers from Phillips and Adonis García in the sixth led the Braves to a 4-2 victory over the Padres. In the third game of the series, the Braves opened the flood gates with a nine-run performance, including a solo homer from Inciarte, to defeat the Padres 9-2 and win their first series of the season. The final game of the series turned into a home run derby with two from Freeman, solo and two-run, a pinch-hit homer from Allen Córdoba and a two-run homer in the eighth inning by Austin Hedges, but it was Dansby Swanson's left field single in the ninth that scored the walk-off RBI to give the Braves a 5-4 victory over the Padres.

Entering the bottom of the ninth inning trailing three runs, Washington Nationals closer Blake Treinen loaded up the bases and allowed one run to score on a walk, but struck out Chase d'Arnaud to hand the Braves their first loss at SunTrust Park on April 18. A solo homer by Freeman was the highlight of the Braves's performance that included two grand slams surrendered to Bryce Harper and Ryan Zimmerman in a 14-4 loss in the second game of the series against the Nationals. In the final game of the series, Zimmerman hit a two-run homer and Stephen Strasburg struck out 10 to complete the sweep in a 3-2 Nationals victory over the Braves.

Freeman hit his seventh homer on the season in the first of a three-game road series on April 21, but that wasn't enough to overcome Jeremy Hellickson holding the Braves to three hits over seven innings in a 4-3 loss to the Philadelphia Phillies. Phillips's homer in the ninth tied the second game of the series and a throwing error by Tommy Joseph of the Phillies allowed Swanson to score an unearned run, but Johnson couldn't secure the game for the Braves, thanks to Swanson unable to get the ball out of his glove to secure a game-ending double play, and Maikel Franco hit a walk-off two-run single to deep right to hand the Braves their fifth straight loss. Kemp's solo home run in the seventh was the best the Braves could do against Aaron Altherr, César Hernández and Odubel Herrera hitting consecutive homers in the eighth and were swept by the Phillies in a 5-2 loss.

The Braves posted a five-run first inning, including a three-run double by Flowers, and Teherán allowed four hits and two runs in six and 1/3 innings pitched in an 8-2 win over the Mets on April 27, snapping a six-game losing skid. The final game of the two-game series the next night went back and forth for the first five innings, but Kurt Suzuki hit a three-run homer in the top of the fifth to lead the Braves to a 7-5 victory and sweep of the Mets.

The Braves rallied twice from four-run deficits, thanks to a three-run double in the third inning and Suzuki's pinch-hit single in the eighth, and hit the go-ahead two-run homer to center field in the ninth to clinch a 10-8 win over the Milwaukee Brewers on April 28. Kemp's three-homer performance highlighted an 11-run, 20-hit rout of the Brewers the following night and Jamie Garcia gave up only two runs on three hits over six innings pitched in an 11-3 win over the Brewers. The Braves carried a 2-1 lead into the sixth inning, but Swanson bobbled a grounder hit by Hernan Perez trying to throw to second and end the inning with two outs. This proved fatal to the Braves as Domingo Santana came up to bat and knocked in a three-run homer that ended the Braves's four-game win streak in a 4-3 loss.

==== May ====
Teherán started the Braves first game back home since April 20 by giving up a leadoff homer to Michael Conforto and gave up five runs in the fourth inning in a 7-5 loss to an injury-depleted New York Mets squad on May 1. The following night, Matt Harvey of the Mets surrendered six runs in five and a third innings pitched to three runs by Dickey. Jay Bruce's grand slam in the top of the ninth with two outs on the board pulled the Mets within two runs of the Braves, but Braves closer Johnson recorded the final out to give the Braves a 9-7 victory. The Braves could only muster five runs against an onslaught of 20 hits and 16 runs by the Mets in a 16-5 loss in the third game of the series.

The Braves couldn't muster a run in a 10-0 loss to the St. Louis Cardinals on May 5. Garcia's three-run homer kept the Braves alive, but couldn't overcome a two-run homer from Matt Carpenter, a solo shot from Matt Adams and being held to one hit through the first six innings in a 5-3 loss the following night. A four-run rally to send the game into extra innings on May 7 was rendered moot by Tommy Pham's two-run homer in the 14th in a 6-4 loss to the Cardinals.

Colón surrendered five runs in the first inning alone in an 8-3 loss to the Houston Astros on May 9. Freeman and García homered to give the Braves a 2-1 lead in the fourth inning on May 10, but Carlos Correa landed a double in left-field to bring in two runs and the Astros won 4-2.

Mike Foltynewicz surrendered just six hits and one run in six innings pitched, and the Braves ballooned a 2-1 lead with a six-run seventh inning to beat the Miami Marlins 8-3 on May 12 and snap a six-game losing skid. Teherán pitched six scoreless innings, allowing only three hits, and Nick Markakis and Swanson brought in runners with singles in the fourth inning to clinch a series win in a 3-1 victory the following night. The Marlins took the final game of the series with a three-run homer off the bat of Tyler Moore and beating the Braves 3-1.

Freeman's 13th homer of the season highlighted a 10-run barrage the Braves put up on the road in Toronto in a 10-6 victory over the Toronto Blue Jays on May 15. Swanson and Freeman homered in the seventh inning the next night to lift the Braves 9-5 over the Blue Jays in the second game of the series and last in Toronto. Back in Atlanta on May 17 for the third of four games against the Blue Jays, the Braves took advantage of a poor start by Joe Biagini with a six-run first inning, including a three-run homer by Kurt Suzuki, to take the series victory in an 8-4 game win. Marcus Stroman's fourth inning homer highlighted a nine-run shutout of the Braves in the last of a four-game interleague series.

With the score tied at four in the eighth inning on May 19, Enny Romero of the Nationals issued Phillips a one-out walk, who then stole second a few moments, gave up a right-field single to Markakis, allowing Phillips to score, and then surrendered a two-run homer to Suzuki to give the Braves a 7-4 victory. Flowers, Kemp and Rio Ruiz all homered to give the Braves a 5-2 victory the following day. Stephen Strasburg recorded 11 strikeouts and held the Braves to five hits in 7 and 2/3rd innings pitched in a 3-2 victory over the Braves in the final game of the series.

The Braves put the pressure from the start on Pittsburgh Pirates pitcher Gerrit Cole, earning five runs over 4 and 2/3rd's innings, including Phillips's 200th career homer, in a 5-2 victory on May 22. The Braves and Pirates swapped the lead three times after play resumed following a three and a half hour rain delay the following night, but Matt Adams lined a walk-off single to give the Braves a 6-5 victory. The Pirates rallied from a two-run deficit in the ninth inning and posted a seven-run rally in the 10th, thanks to three consecutive homers from David Freese, Jose Osuna and Jordy Mercer, to hand the Braves a 12-5 loss. Iván Nova held the Braves to two runs over 8 and 1/3rd innings pitched in a 9-4 loss to the Pirates to close out the series.

After Swanson was intentionally walked, putting two runners on base in the seventh inning, pitcher Garcia singled to left field and brought in Flowers, who was hit by a throw from Brandon Belt, and Swanson to score the first and only runs of the game in a 2-0 victory over the San Francisco Giants on May 26. Ty Blach held the Braves to a three-hit shutout heading into the eighth inning and faltered, allowing the Braves to score two runs, but it made no difference in the end as the Braves fell 6-3. Johnny Cueto allowed just one run and six hits over six innings pitched to beat the Braves 7-1 in the final of the three-game series on May 28.

Teherán surrendered three home runs on six hits over 6 and 1/3rd innings pitched, but was bailed out by a six-run third inning to give the Braves the victory over the Anaheim Angels on May 29. After Peterson bobbled a double-play that would've ended the seven-pitch scoreless third inning, Albert Pujols knocked a three-run homer to left-field and opened a nine-run inning that relegated the Braves to a 9-3 loss. Kemp's second inning homer put the Braves up 1-0 through the seventh inning, but the Angels tied the game on a Rio Ruiz throwing error and Eric Young Jr.'s go-ahead homer in the eighth closed out the three game series with a 2-1 defeat for the Braves.

==== June ====
Foltynewicz allowed just two hits and recorded 10 strikeouts over seven scoreless innings and Swanson put the Braves up early with a two-run homer in the third, but Johnson blew the save in the bottom of the ninth and Devin Mesoraco's walk-off homer in the 10th ended the game in a 3-2 win for the Cincinnati Reds on June 2. Adams recorded the first grand slam of his career with a four-run shot over the center field wall in the fifth inning, but the Reds responded with a five-run rally the following inning and the game went into extra innings. In the 12th, Adams launched a left-center field go-ahead homer to give the Braves a 6-5 victory. Inciarte had a career day with five hits and driving in five runs in an offensive shootout game that ended in a 13-8 victory for the Braves.

The Braves returned home on June 5 for the first of a three-game series against the Philadelphia Phillies, and opened the first game by surrendering nine unanswered runs, including a two-run homer to Odubel Herrera, in an 11-4 loss. García allowed a mere three runs on eight hits over 7 and 2/3rd innings pitched, his fourth consecutive game of allowing three or fewer runs, but the lack of run support relegated the Braves to a 3-1 loss. Swanson's three-run homer and Adams's two-run homer highlighted an offensive rout of the Phillies, and Foltynewicz complemented the rout with a four-hit, seven-inning performance to deliver the Braves a 14-1 victory. Dickey surrendered just three hits in seven innings to deliver the Braves a 3-1 victory over the Phillies in the last of the four-game series.

With the score tied at two, Swanson hit a double and scored on a walk-off single by Rio Ruiz to win 3-2 in the first of a four-game series against the New York Mets on June 9. The next day, Yoenis Céspedes's ninth inning grand slam hit to left-center field sealed a 6-1 victory for the Mets in the first game of the doubleheader. Steven Matz held the Braves to one run on five hits over seven innings pitched, Jay Bruce hit a three-run homer in the fifth and T. J. Rivera hit a two-run homer in the seventh to complete an 8-1 doubleheader sweep of the Braves. Seth Lugo gave up just one run off of six hits over seven innings pitched to clinch a 2-1 victory over the Braves in the final game of the series on June 11.

The Braves opened the first of three games in the nation's capital on June 12 with six runs and three homers in the first three innings, and blew multi-run leads twice, but Flowers put the Braves up with a three-run opposite-field go-ahead homer in the ninth and Johnson pitched the save to clinch an 11-10 victory over the Washington Nationals. Swanson recorded an RBI double in the fourth inning and Ruiz knocked out a two-run homer in the Braves' three-run sixth, taking a 5-3 lead, but Dickey failed to retire the five batters he faced in the bottom of the sixth – which included a two-run homer from Zimmerman, his second of the night – and fell 10-5 to the Nationals. Teherán surrendered only a two-run homer off six hits in seven innings pitched, while the Braves piled on the runs, including a homer from Suzuki, to deliver a 13-2 blowout over the Nationals.

Back home on June 16, Justin Bour's solo shot in the top of the fourth inning highlighted a five-run shutout of the Braves by the Miami Marlins. The following day, Tyler Moore's two-run shot over the left-field wall unleashed a seven-run barrage over the course of the fifth and sixth innings that put the Marlins up 7-3 over the Braves. Flowers led off the Braves comeback in the sixth with a two-run homer, Adams cut the deficit to one with an RBI double in the seventh to bring in Flowers and Phillips scored the tying run on a Markakis double in the ninth. With the score tied at seven in the 10th, Phillips drove in the winning run on a walk-off single to center and the Braves won 8-7. After the Braves carried a 4-2 lead out of the seventh inning and the Marlins tied the game on a two-run Marcell Ozuna homer in the eighth, Phillips knocked in a walk-off RBI single to give the Braves a 5-4 victory in the final game of the series.

The first of four games against the San Francisco Giants began as a pitching duel with Dickey giving up just three hits in seven innings pitched and Johnny Cueto surrendering just two runs on five hits through seven pitched, but the Giants bullpen collapsed in the final two innings – surrendering seven runs in the process – and the Braves took a 9-0 victory. After Swanson botched a double-play in the eighth inning, Austin Slater hooked the ball around the right field pole to record a three-run homer and the Giants scored two more runs – unearned – to beat the Braves 6-3. Hunter Pence tied the contest at three runs each with a solo shot in the ninth inning, but Kemp blasted a two-run walk-off homer in the 11th to hand the Braves a 5-3 victory. Lane Adams dispensed a three-hit homer in the fifth inning as part of an eight-run scoring barrage by the Braves, giving them a 12-6 cushion over the Giants that proved vital in the remaining four innings of a 12-11 victory.

In the first of three games against the Milwaukee Brewers on June 23, Phillips sent a shot over the left field wall in the first inning, Eric Sogard dropped an inning-ending double play feed – resulting in a run-scoring error – and the Braves halted their two-run rally in the eighth to claim a 5-4 victory. Dickey surrendered a run in the first inning, but halted the Brewers through seven innings pitched – and was aided by a two-run shot in the third by Phillips – to gives the Braves a 3-1 victory. Travis Shaw's two-run homer to right-field in the first inning sparked a seven-run shutout of the Braves in the final game of the series.

Sean Newcomb allowed only six hits and recorded eight strikeouts in six innings pitched in a 3-0 victory over the San Diego Padres on June 27. Manuel Margot sparked a trio of two-run rallies, giving the Padres a six-run cushion, to hold off a late rally by the Braves and win 7-4. Padres rookie pitcher Dinelson Lamet allowed only four hits through seven innings pitched as the Padres blanked the Braves 6-0.

Foltynewicz carried a no-hitter into the ninth inning, until it was broken up by a leadoff homer from Matt Olson, but Foltynewicz got the run support needed to deliver the Braves a 3-1 victory over the Oakland Athletics on June 30.

==== July ====
Swanson doubled to bring home Danny Santana in the ninth and give the Braves a 4-3 victory over the Athletics. Suzuki hit two homers, including a shot to left field in the 12th inning, to complete a three-game sweep of the Athletics on July 2.

Josh Reddick's grand slam in the ninth inning capped off a 16-4 rout of the Braves by the Houston Astros back in Atlanta on July 4. The Astros improved to a league-best record of 58-27 with a 10-4 season sweep of the Braves on July 5.

Freeman, back from a seven-week DL stint, hit two RBI doubles to put his career hit total over 1000, Suzuki homered in the sixth inning and Foltynewicz gave up just two runs off eight hits through six innings pitched to hand the Braves a 5-2 victory over the Nationals in the nation's capital on July 6. The following night, Dickey gave up just one run off three hits, and only surrendered his first hit of the game in the sixth inning, in seven innings pitched and Freeman drove in three runs to give the Braves a three-run lead in the ninth. But Johnson blew the three-run save opportunity in the ninth and Murphy hit a walk-off single in the 10th to hand the Braves a 5-4 loss. Teherán gave up no runs off four hits in seven innings pitched and the Braves pounced on Stephen Strasburg through three innings pitched to deliver a 13-run shutout of the Nationals. Rendon reached base four times in a 10-5 victory over the Braves in the last of a four-game series on July 9.

The Arizona Diamondbacks were gifted with a go-ahead run in the eighth on a throwing error, but when Freeman hit a clean base two-run single towards Gregor Blanco, who then proceeded to pick up and throw it to second, Phillips slipped rounding third, saw Blanco was throwing to second and raced home to score the game-winning run in a 4-3 victory on July 14. After Diamondbacks reliever Randall Delgado didn't get a full count call go his way, thus escaping the sixth inning with a 3-2 lead, pinch-hitter Lane Adams knocked in a bases-clearing, three-run go-ahead double that put the Braves up 5-3 and the Braves held on to win 8-5. García allowed just one run off four hits through seven innings pitched, Phillips doubled three times and Matt Adams and Kemp combined to add four runs with homers in the third inning to complete a 7-1 sweep of the Diamondbacks, putting the Braves at .500 on the season for the first time since April 17.

Wade Davis allowed the Braves to close to within a run of the Chicago Cubs in the ninth inning, but Johan Camargo hit a fly ball to left field that was caught to clinch a 4-3 loss for the Braves on July 17. John Lackey gave up one run, a leadoff second inning shot from Markakis, in a five-inning pitch performance, and was propped up by a four-run third inning that clinched a 5-1 victory for the Cubs. Mike Montgomery allowed one run off two hits through six innings and hit his first career home run in an 8-2 series sweep of the Braves by the Cubs.

Suzuki put the Braves up with a two-run homer in the first inning and Foltynewicz surrendered three runs off six hits over 6 1/3 innings pitched to end the Los Angeles Dodgers' 11-game win streak on July 20. In what wound up García's final start in a Braves uniform, he allowed three runs off seven hits over seven innings pitched and hit a fifth inning grand slam in support of a 12-3 victory over the Dodgers. Teherán's perfect road record on the season came to an end on July 22 when he surrendered three homers in a 6-2 loss. The Dodgers took a 3-1 lead in the fourth inning with a three-run hook to left by Austin Barnes, followed by an eighth inning solo shot from Cody Bellinger. Matt Adams erased the three-run deficit with a three-run homer in the ninth. The rally was for not, however, as Logan Forsythe hit a walk-off, bases-loaded single to beat the Braves 5-4.

Dickey exited the game after surrendering four runs without escaping the fourth inning, contributing to a 10-2 rout of the Braves by the Arizona Diamondbacks on July 24. Foltynewicz allowed two runs off five hits over six innings pitched, Suzuki broke a two-run tie in the seventh inning and added a leadoff homer in the eighth to highlight an 8-3 victory over the Diamondbacks. J. D. Martinez's two homers topped off a 10-3 rout of the Braves in the last of a three-game series on July 26.

Back east in Philadelphia on July 28, Teherán suffered a fifth-inning collapse, surrendering seven runs – including back to back solo homers to Aaron Altherr and Cameron Rupp, and a three-run shot to Tommy Joseph – as the Braves fell 10-3 to the league-worst Phillies. Newcomb exited the fifth inning after giving up one run off two hits in five innings pitched, but the 3-1 lead the Braves maintained collapsed through faulty relief pitching, resulting in Herrera's game-tying shot in the ninth and Ty Kelly's walk-off single in the 11th. Dickey allowed just six hits and no earned runs, only allowing one unearned run off a wild pitch, over seven innings pitched, but their inability to score with runners in scoring position (they went 1-for-8 on July 30) cost them when Freddy Galvis' walk-off single notched them a 2-1 loss. Herrera and Maikel Franco's homers completed a four-game sweep of the Braves on July 31.

==== August ====
Kenta Maeda surrendered only two hits in seven innings pitched and Cody Bellinger homered in the fourth inning to deal a 3-2 loss to the Braves back home in Atlanta on August 1. Flowers hit a two-run, pinch-hit homer in the eighth inning to snap both a six-game losing skid and the Dodgers' nine-game winning streak in a 5-3 victory. Wood allowed just a single run off seven hits through six innings pitched and Chris Taylor amassed three hits, including a two-run homer, to cap the three-game series with the Braves in a 7-4 victory.

Giancarlo Stanton's two homers midway through the first of a three-game series on August 4 put the Miami Marlins up 3-1, but sloppy fielding from the Marlins and a three-run shot in the sixth inning by Markakis sealed a 5-3 victory for the Braves. The next night, the Braves took advantage of the Marlins' depleted bullpen to score five runs, three off a left-center Freeman homer, in the seventh inning to put the 7-2 contest out of reach. Six strong innings from Jose Urena, allowing only a single run off three hits, and a three-run homer by Marcell Ozuna prevented the Braves from completing a three-game sweep of the Marlins in a 4-1 loss.

Herrera added to his hit streak against the Braves with a two-run shot to right field as the Braves fell 5-2 to the Philadelphia Phillies on August 8.

==== September ====
The Braves took three games out of four in their home series with the Marlins, with all three wins coming by way of a walk-off.

Noteworthy: The Braves never held a winning record at any point during the 2017 regular season. Multiple times they had a .500 record, but would lose at least their next game to drop them back to a losing record.

=== Game log ===
Legend
	Braves win
	Braves loss
	Postponement
**Bold**	Braves team member

2017 Game Log: 72–90 (Home: 37–44; Away: 35–46)
April: 10–13 (Home: 4–3; Away: 6–10)

#	Date	Opponent	Score	Win	Loss	Save	Attendance	Record	Box/Streak
1	April 3	@ Mets	0–6	Robles (1–0)	**Krol** (0–1)	—	44,384	0–1	L1
2	April 5	@ Mets	3–1 (12)	**Johnson** (1–0)	Montero (0–1)	—	28,113	1–1	W1
3	April 6	@ Mets	2–6	Harvey (1–0)	**García** (0–1)	—	23,100	1–2	L1
4	April 7	@ Pirates	4–5	Nova (1–0)	**Foltynewicz** (0–1)	Watson (1)	36,484	1–3	L2
5	April 8	@ Pirates	4–6	Kuhl (1–0)	**Dickey** (0–1)	Watson (2)	33,004	1–4	L3
6	April 9	@ Pirates	5–6 (10)	Rivero (1–0)	**Ramirez** (0–1)	—	22,713	1–5	L4
7	April 11	@ Marlins	4–8	Straily (1–1)	**Colón** (0–1)	—	36,519	1–6	L5
8	April 12	@ Marlins	5–4	**Vizcaíno** (1–0)	Ramos (0–1)	**Johnson** (1)	16,808	2–6	W1
9	April 14	Padres	5–2	**Teherán** (1–0)	Chacín (1–2)	**Johnson** (2)	41,149	3–6	W2
10	April 15	Padres	4–2	**Dickey** (1–1)	Richard (1–2)	**Johnson** (3)	41,149	4–6	W3
11	April 16	Padres	9–2	**Colón** (1–1)	Cahill (0–2)	—	37,147	5–6	W4
12	April 17	Padres	5–4	**Johnson** (2–0)	Maurer (0–1)	—	24,516	6–6	W5
13	April 18	Nationals	1–3	Scherzer (2–1)	**Foltynewicz** (0–2)	Kelley (1)	21,834	6–7	L1
14	April 19	Nationals	4–14	Ross (1–0)	**Teherán** (1–1)	—	22,101	6–8	L2
15	April 20	Nationals	2–3	Strasburg (2–0)	**Dickey** (1–2)	Kelley (2)	27,498	6–9	L3
16	April 21	@ Phillies	3–4	Hellickson (3–0)	**Colón** (1–2)	Neris (2)	24,189	6–10	L4
17	April 22	@ Phillies	3–4 (10)	Gómez (2–1)	**Johnson** (2–1)	—	31,334	6–11	L5
18	April 23	@ Phillies	2–5	Rodriguez (1–0)	**Vizcaíno** (1–1)	—	28,632	6–12	L6
	April 25	@ Mets	Postponed (rain); rescheduled for September 25 as part of a doubleheader						
19	April 26	@ Mets	8–2	**Teherán** (2–1)	Gsellman (0–2)	—	22,819	7–12	W1
20	April 27	@ Mets	7–5	**Dickey** (2–2)	Harvey (2–1)	—	23,243	8–12	W2
21	April 28	@ Brewers	10–8	**Ramirez** (1–1)	Feliz (0–3)	**Johnson** (4)	26,453	9–12	W3
22	April 29	@ Brewers	11–3	**García** (1–1)	Nelson (1–2)	—	30,026	10–12	W4
23	April 30	@ Brewers	3–4	Garza (1–0)	**Foltynewicz** (0–3)	Feliz (6)	24,395	10–13	L1

May: 12–16 (Home: 6–9; Away: 6–7)

#	Date	Opponent	Score	Win	Loss	Save	Attendance	Record	Box/Streak
24	May 1	Mets	5–7	Gsellman (1–2)	**Teherán** (2–2)	Familia (2)	21,668	10–14	L2
25	May 2	Mets	9–7	**Dickey** (3–2)	Harvey (2–2)	**Johnson** (5)	21,359	11–14	W1
26	May 3	Mets	5–16	deGrom (2–1)	**Colón** (1–3)	—	22,656	11–15	L1
	May 4	Mets	Postponed (rain); Rescheduled for June 10 as part of a doubleheader						
27	May 5	Cardinals	0–10	Lynn (4–1)	**Foltynewicz** (0–4)	—	34,465	11–16	L2
28	May 6	Cardinals	3–5	Leake (4–1)	**Teherán** (2–3)	Oh (7)	40,706	11–17	L3
29	May 7	Cardinals	4–6 (14)	Tuivailala (1–0)	**Collmenter** (0–1)	Siegrist (1)	40,200	11–18	L4
30	May 9	@ Astros	3–8	Morton (4–2)	**Colón** (1–4)	—	28,724	11–19	L5
31	May 10	@ Astros	2–4	Musgrove (2–3)	**García** (1–2)	Giles (9)	23,676	11–20	L6
32	May 12	@ Marlins	8–4	**Foltynewicz** (1–4)	Urena (1–1)	—	20,052	12–20	W1
33	May 13	@ Marlins	3–1	**Teherán** (3–3)	Volquez (0–5)	**Johnson** (6)	26,692	13–20	W2
34	May 14	@ Marlins	1–3	Barraclough (1–0)	**Dickey** (3–3)	Ramos (4)	17,277	13–21	L1
35	May 15	@ Blue Jays	10–6	**Colón** (2–4)	Bolsinger (0–2)	—	29,766	14–21	W1
36	May 16	@ Blue Jays	9–5	**Ramírez** (2–1)	Barnes (0–1)	—	34,431	15–21	W2
37	May 17	Blue Jays	8–4	**Foltynewicz** (2–4)	Biagini (1–2)	—	28,293	16–21	W3
38	May 18	Blue Jays	0–9	Stroman (4–2)	**Teherán** (3–4)	—	25,419	16–22	L1
39	May 19	Nationals	7–4	**Vizcaíno** (2–1)	Romero (2–2)	**Johnson** (7)	35,369	17–22	W1
40	May 20	Nationals	5–2	**Krol** (1–1)	Scherzer (4–3)	**Johnson** (8)	37,347	18–22	W2
41	May 21	Nationals	2–3	Strasburg (5–1)	**García** (4–3)	Glover (3)	32,895	18–23	L1
42	May 22	Pirates	5–2	**Foltynewcz** (3–4)	Cole (2–5)	**Johnson** (9)	21,896	19–23	W1
43	May 23	Pirates	6–5	**Jackson** (1–0)	Watson (2–1)	—	25,040	20–23	W2
44	May 24	Pirates	5–12 (10)	Rivero (2–1)	**Collmenter** (0–2)	—	25,981	20–24	L1
45	May 25	Pirates	4–9	Nova (5–3)	**Colón** (2–5)	—	33,713	20–25	L2
46	May 26	@ Giants	2–0	**García** (2–3)	Cain (3–3)	**Johnson** (10)	41,326	21–25	W1
47	May 27	@ Giants	3–6	Blach (3–2)	**Foltynewicz** (3–5)	Melancon (10)	41,355	21–26	L1
48	May 28	@ Giants	1–7	Cueto (5–4)	**Dickey** (3–4)	—	42,343	21–27	L2
49	May 29	@ Angels	6–3	**Teherán** (4–4)	Nolasco (2–5)	**Johnson** (11)	37,891	22–27	W1
50	May 30	@ Angels	3–9	Bridwell (1–0)	**Colón** (2–6)	—	32,028	22–28	L1
51	May 31	@ Angels	1–2	Parker (1–2)	**Vizcaíno** (2–2)	Norris (10)	35,795	22–29	L2

June: 16–12 (Home: 10–8; Away: 6–4)

#	Date	Opponent	Score	Win	Loss	Save	Attendance	Record	Box/Streak
52	June 2	@ Reds	2–3 (10)	Iglesias (2–0)	**Ramírez** (2–2)	—	27,300	22–30	L3
53	June 3	@ Reds	6–5 (12)	**Johnson** (3–1)	Wood (0–4)	—	26,485	23–30	W1
54	June 4	@ Reds	13–8	**Teherán** (5–5)	Garrett (3–4)	—	26,227	24–30	W2
55	June 5	Phillies	4–11	Pivetta (1–2)	**Colón** (2–7)	—	20,942	24–31	L1
56	June 6	Phillies	1–3	Nola (3–3)	**García** (2–4)	Neshek (1)	23,489	24–32	L2
57	June 7	Phillies	14–1	**Foltynewicz** (4–5)	Eickhoff (0–7)	—	24,185	25–32	W1
58	June 8	Phillies	3–1	**Dickey** (4–4)	Lively (1–1)	**Johnson** (12)	25,095	26–32	W2
59	June 9	Mets	3–2	**Johnson** (4–1)	Salas (0–2)	—	36,791	27–32	W3
60	June 10 (1)	Mets	1–6	Gsellman (5–3)	**Newcomb** (0–1)	Reed (10)	27,684	27–33	L1
61	June 10 (2)	Mets	1–8	Matz (1–0)	**Wisler** (0–1)	—	40,174	27–34	L2
62	June 11	Mets	1–2	Lugo (1–0)	**García** (2–5)	Reed (11)	30,638	27–35	L3
63	June 12	@ Nationals	11–10	**Motte** (1–0)	Albers (2–1)	**Johnson** (13)	28,909	28–35	W1
64	June 13	@ Nationals	5–10	Gott (1–0)	**Dickey** (4–5)	—	31,762	28–36	L1
65	June 14	@ Nationals	13–2	**Teherán** (6–4)	Roark (6–4)	—	36,227	29–36	W1
66	June 16	Marlins	0–5	Straily (5–4)	**Newcomb** (0–2)	—	38,123	29–37	L1
67	June 17	Marlins	8–7 (10)	**Vizcaino** (3–2)	Ramos (1–3)	—	38,661	30–37	W1
68	June 18	Marlins	5–4	**Johnson** (5–1)	Steckenrider (0–1)	—	36,912	31–37	W2
69	June 19	Giants	9–0	**Dickey** (5–5)	Cueto (5–7)	—	24,723	32–37	W3
70	June 20	Giants	3–6	Moore (3–7)	**Teherán** (6–5)	Melancon (11)	23,823	32–38	L1
71	June 21	Giants	5–3 (11)	**Jackson** (2–0)	**Gearrin** (1–2)	—	25,771	33–38	W1
72	June 22	Giants	12–11	**Hursh** (1–0)	**Cain** (3-7)	**Johnson** (14)	25,521	34–38	W2
73	June 23	Brewers	5–4	**Foltynewicz** (5–5)	Nelson (5–4)	**Vizcaino** (1)	30,521	35–38	W3
74	June 24	Brewers	3–1	**Dickey** (6–5)	Garza (3–4)	**Johnson** (15)	38,463	36–38	W4
75	June 25	Brewers	0–7	Davies (8–4)	**Teherán** (6–6)	—	31,634	36–39	L1
76	June 27	@ Padres	3–0	**Newcomb** (1–2)	Chacín (6–7)	**Johnson** (16)	20,667	37–39	W1
77	June 28	@ Padres	4–7	Perdomo (3–4)	**Colón** (2–8)	Maurer (15)	19,312	37–40	L1
78	June 29	@ Padres	0–6	Lamet (2–2)	**García** (2–6)	—	20,936	37–41	L2
79	June 30	@ Athletics	3–1	**Foltynewicz** (6–5)	Gray (3–4)	**Johnson** (17)	19,286	38–41	W1

July: 10–15 (Home: 3–5; Away: 7–10)

#	Date	Opponent	Score	Win	Loss	Save	Attendance	Record	Box/Streak
80	July 1	@ Athletics	4–3	**Freeman** (1–0)	Casilla (1–3)	**Johnson** (18)	22,230	39–41	W2
81	July 2	@ Athletics	4–3 (11)	**Johnson** (6–1)	Axford (0–1)	**Vizcaíno** (2)	18,438	40–41	W3
82	July 4	Astros	4–16	Peacock (6–1)	**Newcomb** (1–3)	—	41,456	40–42	L1
83	July 5	Astros	4–10	Devenski (6–3)	**García** (2–7)	—	37,278	40–43	L2
84	July 6	@ Nationals	5–2	**Foltynewicz** (7–5)	González (7–4)	**Johnson** (19)	22,724	41–43	W1
85	July 7	@ Nationals	4–5 (10)	Albers (5–1)	**Krol** (1–2)	—	32,664	41–44	L1
86	July 8	@ Nationals	13–0	**Teherán** (7–6)	Strasburg (9–3)	—	38,439	42–44	W1
87	July 9	@ Nationals	5–10	Grace (1–0)	**Newcomb** (1–4)	—	35,030	42–45	L1
**88th All-Star Game in Miami, Florida**
88	July 14	D-backs	4–3	**Brothers** (1–0)	Bradley (3–2)	**Johnson** (20)	38,852	43–45	W1
89	July 15	D-backs	8–5	**Krol** (2–2)	Delgado (1–2)	**Johnson** (21)	41,627	44–45	W2
90	July 16	D-backs	7–1	**García** (3–7)	Godley (3–4)	—	36,637	45–45	W3
91	July 17	Cubs	3–4	Lester (6–6)	**Teherán** (7–7)	Davis (18)	41,256	45–46	L1
92	July 18	Cubs	1–5	Lackey (6–9)	**Newcomb** (1–5)	—	41,541	45–47	L2
93	July 19	Cubs	2–8	Montgomery (2–6)	**Dickey** (6–6)	—	40,054	45–48	L3
94	July 20	@ Dodgers	6–3	**Foltynewicz** (8–5)	McCarthy (6–4)	**Johnson** (22)	45.636	46–48	W1
95	July 21	@ Dodgers	12–3	**García** (4–7)	Wood (11–1)	—	46,083	47–48	W2
96	July 22	@ Dodgers	2–6	Hill (7–4)	**Teherán** (7–8)	—	47,497	47–49	L1
97	July 23	@ Dodgers	4–5 (10)	Morrow (3–0)	**Johnson** (6–2)	—	44,701	47–50	L2
98	July 24	@ D-backs	2–10	Greinke (12–4)	**Dickey** (6–7)	—	20,862	47–51	L3
99	July 25	@ D-backs	8–3	**Foltynewicz** (9–5)	Hoover (1–1)	—	25,069	48–51	W1
100	July 26	@ D-backs	3–10	Corbin (8–9)	**Blair** (0–1)	—	25,836	48–52	L1
101	July 28	@ Phillies	3–10	Thompson (1–0)	**Teherán** (7–9)	Benoit (2)	17,177	48–53	L2
102	July 29	@ Phillies	3–4 (11)	Neris (3–4)	**Brothers** (1–1)	—	28,162	48–54	L3
103	July 30	@ Phillies	1–2	Neris (4–4)	**Brothers** (1–2)	—	20,680	48–55	L4
104	July 31	@ Phillies	6–7	Pivetta (4–6)	**Foltynewicz** (9–6)	Neris (10)	20,297	48–56	L5

August: 11–17 (Home: 6–11; Away: 5–6)

#	Date	Opponent	Score	Win	Loss	Save	Attendance	Record	Box/Streak
105	August 1	Dodgers	2–3	Maeda (10–4)	**Sims** (0–1)	Jansen (28)	32,174	48–57	L6
106	August 2	Dodgers	5–3	**Brothers** (2–2)	Báez (3–2)	**Vizcaíno** (3)	28,107	49–57	W1
107	August 3	Dodgers	4–7	Wood (13–1)	**Newcomb** (1–6)	—	29,680	49–58	L1
108	August 4	Marlins	5–3	**Dickey** (7–7)	Conley (4–4)	**Vizcaíno** (4)	35,914	50–58	W1
109	August 5	Marlins	7–2	**Foltynewicz** (10–6)	Straily (7–8)	**Vizcaíno** (5)	40,731	51–58	W2
110	August 6	Marlins	1–4	Ureña (10–5)	**Sims** (0–2)	Ziegler (2)	29,651	51–59	L1
111	August 8	Phillies	2–5	Eflin' (1–3)	**Teherán** (7–10)	Neris (12)	25,783	51–60	L2
112	August 9	Phillies	2–3	Eickhoff (3–7)	**Newcomb** (1–7)	Neris (13)	22,776	51–61	L3
113	August 11	@ Cardinals	5–8	Wainwright (12–5)	**Foltynewicz** (10–7)	Bowman (2)	41,928	51–62	L4
114	August 12	@ Cardinals	5–6	Martinez (9–9)	**Sims** (0–3)	Rosenthal (11)	46,360	51–63	L5
115	August 13	@ Cardinals	6–3	**Dickey** (8–7)	Wacha (9–5)	**Vizcaíno** (6)	44,534	52–63	W1
116	August 14	@ Rockies	0–3	Dunn (5–1)	**Brothers** (2–3)	Holland (35)	33,641	52–64	L1
117	August 15	@ Rockies	4–3	**Freeman** (2–0)	Neshek (3–3)	**Vizcaíno** (7)	28,655	53–64	W1
118	August 16	@ Rockies	2–17	Gray (5–2)	**Foltynewicz** (10–8)	—	30,695	53–65	L1
119	August 17	@ Rockies	10–4	**Sims** (1–3)	Hoffman (6–5)	—	30,020	54–65	W1
120	August 18	Reds	3–5	Romano (3–5)	**Dickey** (8–8)	Iglesias (23)	31,174	54–66	L1
121	August 19	Reds	8–11	Stephenson (1–4)	**Teherán** (7–11)	—	39,317	54–67	L2
122	August 20	Reds	8–1	**Newcomb** (2–7)	Castillo (2–6)	—	25,758	55–67	W1
123	August 21	Mariners	5–6	Albers (2–0)	**Foltynewicz** (10–9)	Diaz (28)	21,284	55–68	L1
124	August 22	Mariners	4–0	**Sims** (2–3)	Gonzales (0–1)	—	22,947	56–68	W1
125	August 23	Mariners	6–9	Phelps (4–5)	**Johnson** (6–3)	Diaz (29)	23,890	56–69	L1
126	August 25	Rockies	5–2	**Teherán** (8–11)	Bettis (0–1)	**Vizcaíno** (8)	33,577	57–69	W1
127	August 26	Rockies	6–7	Neshek (4–3)	**Vizcaíno** (3–3)	McGee (2)	32,448	57–70	L1
128	August 27	Rockies	0–3	Gray (6–3)	**Foltynewicz** (10–10)	McGee (3)	28,154	57–71	L2
129	August 28	@ Phillies	1–6	Nola (10–9)	**Sims** (2–4)	—	15,154	57–72	L3
	August 29	@ Phillies	Postponed (rain); rescheduled for August 30 as part of a doubleheader						
130	August 30 (1)	@ Phillies	9–1	**Dickey** (9–8)	Eickhoff (4–8)	—		58–72	W1
131	August 30 (2)	@ Phillies	5–2	**Teherán** (9–11)	Leiter Jr. (2–4)	**Vizcaíno** (9)	15,706	59–72	W2
132	August 31	@ Cubs	2–6	Hendricks (6–4)	**Newcomb** (2–8)	—	38,031	59–73	L1

September/October: 13–16 (Home: 8–8; Away: 5–8)

#	Date	Opponent	Score	Win	Loss	Save	Attendance	Record	Box/Streak
133	September 1	@ Cubs	0–2	Lackey (11–10)	**Foltynewicz** (10–11)	Davis (28)	37,280	59–74	L2
134	September 2	@ Cubs	12–14	Lester (9–7)	**Sims** (2–5)	—	41,329	59–75	L3
135	September 3	@ Cubs	5–1	**Fried** (1–0)	Montgomery (5–7)	—	42,145	60–75	W1
136	September 4	Rangers	2–8	Cashner (9–9)	**Dickey** (9–9)	—	23,474	60–76	L1
	September 5	Rangers	Postponed (rain); rescheduled for September 6 as part of a doubleheader						
137	September 6 (1)	Rangers	8–12	Bibens-Dirkx (5–2)	**Gohara** (0–1)	—	19,971	60–77	L2
138	September 6 (2)	Rangers	5–4	**Teherán** (10–11)	Hamels (9–3)	**Vizcaíno** (10)	20,364	61–77	W1
139	September 7	Marlins	6–5	**Brothers** (3–3)	Ziegler (1–4)	—	23,561	62–77	W2
140	September 8	Marlins	1–7	Ureňa (13–6)	**Foltynewicz** (10–12)	—	30,056	62–78	L1
141	September 9	Marlins	6–5	**Vizcaíno** (4–3)	Barraclough (5–2)	—	34,403	63–78	W1
142	September 10	Marlins	10–8 (11)	**Vizcaíno** (5–3)	Worley (2–5)	—	34,974	64–78	W2
143	September 12	@ Nationals	8–0	**Teherán** (11–11)	González (14–7)	—	22,769	65–78	W3
144	September 13	@ Nationals	8–2	**Gohara** (1–1)	Scherzer (14–6)	—	24,850	66–78	W4
145	September 14	@ Nationals	2–5	Roark (13–9)	**Foltynewicz** (10–13)	Doolittle (21)	25,192	66–79	L1
146	September 15	Mets	3–2	**Newcomb** (3–8)	Montero (5–10)	**Vizcaíno** (11)	29,402	67–79	W1
147	September 16	Mets	3–7	deGrom (15–9)	**Dickey** (9–10)	—	37,846	67–80	L1
148	September 17	Mets	1–5	Gsellman (7–7)	**Teherán** (11–12)	—	32,785	67–81	L2
149	September 19	Nationals	2–4	Scherzer (15–6)	**Gohara** (1–2)	Doolittle (22)	26,709	67–82	L3
150	September 20	Nationals	3–7	González (15–7)	**Ramírez** (2–3)	—	25,054	67–83	L4
151	September 21	Nationals	3–2	**Dickey** (10–10)	Roark (13–10)	**Vizcaíno** (12)	32,702	68–83	W1
152	September 22	Phillies	7–2	**Newcomb** (4–8)	Lively (3–7)	—	33,702	69–83	W2
153	September 23	Phillies	4–2	**Brothers** (4–3)	García (2–5)	**Vizcaíno** (13)	39,809	70–83	W3
154	September 24	Phillies	0–2	Pivetta (7–10)	**Gohara** (1–3)	Neris (24)	33,183	70–84	L1
155	September 25 (1)	@ Mets	9–2	**Sims** (3–5)	Flexen (3–5)	—		71–84	W1
156	September 25 (2)	@ Mets	2–3	Lugo (7–5)	**Fried** (1–1)	Familia (5)	21,698	71–85	L1
157	September 26	@ Mets	3–4	Familia (2–2)	**Minter** (0–1)	—	21,938	71–86	L2
158	September 27	@ Mets	1–7	Gsellman (8–7)	**Newcomb** (4–9)	—	28,617	71–87	L3
159	September 28	@ Marlins	1–7	Peters (1–2)	**Teherán** (11–13)	—	17,305	71–88	L4
160	September 29	@ Marlins	5–6	Conley (8–8)	**Winker** (0–1)	Ziegler (10)	19,527	71–89	L5
161	September 30	@ Marlins	2–10	Despaigne (2–3)	**Sims** (3–6)	—	25,264	71–90	L6
162	October 1	@ Marlins	8–5	**Winkler** (1–1)	Tazawa (3–5)	**Vizcaíno** (14)	25,222	72–90	W1

Legend: = Win = Loss = Postponement
Bold = Braves team member

== Roster ==
2017 Atlanta Braves
Roster
Pitchers: 36 Aaron Blair; 57 Rex Brothers; 55 Josh Collmenter; 40 Bartolo Colón; 19 R. A. Dickey; 26 Mike Foltynewicz; 39 Sam Freeman; 61 Max Fried; 54 Jaime García; 64 Luiz Gohara; 56 Jason Hursh; 58 Luke Jackson; 53 Jim Johnson; 46 Ian Krol; 67 A. J. Minter; 60 Akeel Morris; 30 Jason Motte; 51 Sean Newcomb; 34 Eric O'Flaherty; 52 José Ramírez; 50 Chaz Roe; 50 Lucas Sims; 49 Julio Teherán; 38 Arodys Vizcaíno; 63 Daniel Winkler; 45 Matt Wisler	Catchers: 25 Tyler Flowers; 20 David Freitas; 20 Anthony Recker; 24 Kurt Suzuki; Infielders: 18 Matt Adams; 1 Ozzie Albies; 17 Johan Camargo; 5 Freddie Freeman; 13 Adonis García; 4 Brandon Phillips; 15 Sean Rodriguez; 14 Rio Ruiz; 7 Dansby Swanson	Outfielders: 16,18 Lane Adams; 64 Emilio Bonifácio; 23 Chase d'Arnaud; 11 Ender Inciarte; 2 Micah Johnson; 27 Matt Kemp; 22 Nick Markakis; 8 Jace Peterson; 23 Danny Santana; Other batters: 15 Tony Sanchez	Manager: 43 Brian Snitker; Coaches: 65 Alan Butts (bullpen catcher); 59 José Castro (assistant hitting); 33 Chuck Hernandez (pitching); 9 Terry Pendleton (bench); 12 Eddie Pérez (first base); 32 Marty Reed (bullpen); 68 Braeden Schlehuber (bullpen catcher); 28 Kevin Seitzer (hitting); -- Dave Wallace (special assistant to pitching); 37 Ron Washington (third base); 66 José Yepez (bullpen catcher)

== Statistics ==
=== Batting ===
Players in bold are on the active MLB roster as of the 2022 season.

Note: G = Games played; AB = At bats; R = Runs; H = Hits; 2B = Doubles; 3B = Triples; HR = Home runs; RBI = Runs batted in; AVG = Batting average; OBP = On-base percentage; SLG = Slugging percentage; SB = Stolen bases

Player	G	AB	R	H	2B	3B	HR	RBI	AVG	OBP	SLG	SB
Nick Markakis	160	593	76	163	39	1	8	76	.275	.354	.384	0
**Ender Inciarte**	157	662	93	201	27	5	11	57	.304	.350	.409	22
**Dansby Swanson**	144	488	59	113	23	2	6	51	.232	.312	.324	3
Brandon Phillips	120	488	68	137	27	1	11	52	.291	.329	.423	10
**Freddie Freeman**	117	440	84	135	35	2	28	71	.307	.403	.586	8
Matt Kemp	115	438	47	121	23	1	19	64	.276	.318	.463	0
Matt Adams	100	291	42	79	20	1	19	58	.271	.315	.543	0
Tyler Flowers	99	317	41	89	16	0	12	49	.281	.378	.445	0
**Jace Peterson**	89	186	15	40	9	2	2	17	.215	.318	.317	3
Lane Adams	85	109	19	30	4	1	5	20	.275	.339	.468	10
**Johan Camargo**	82	241	30	72	21	2	3	27	.299	.331	.452	0
**Kurt Suzuki**	81	276	38	78	13	0	19	50	.283	.351	.536	0
Danny Santana	69	143	16	29	9	2	3	22	.203	.245	.357	0
**Ozzie Albies**	57	217	34	62	9	5	6	28	.286	.354	.456	8
Rio Ruiz	53	150	22	29	5	0	4	19	.193	.283	.307	1
Adonis García	52	173	19	41	4	0	5	19	.237	.273	.347	4
Emilio Bonifácio	38	38	2	5	1	1	0	3	.132	.150	.211	0
Micah Johnson	18	10	2	2	0	0	0	0	.200	.200	.200	1
Sean Rodriguez	15	37	6	6	1	0	2	3	.162	.326	.351	1
Chase D'Arnaud	11	8	5	3	0	0	0	0	.375	.500	.375	0
David Freitas	6	17	2	4	2	0	0	2	.235	.235	.353	0
Anthony Recker	6	7	1	1	0	0	0	0	.143	.143	.143	0
Tony Sanchez	1	1	0	0	0	0	0	0	.000	.000	.000	0
Pitcher totals	162	272	11	27	1	0	1	18	.099	.121	.114	0
**Team totals**	**162**	**5584**	**732**	**1467**	**289**	**26**	**165**	**706**	**.263**	**.326**	**.412**	**77**

=== Pitching ===
Players in bold are on the active MLB roster as of the 2022 season.

Note: W = Wins; L = Losses; ERA = Earned run average; G = Games pitched; GS = Games started; SV = Saves; IP = Innings pitched; H = Hits allowed; R = Runs allowed; ER = Earned runs allowed; HR = Home runs allowed; BB = Walks allowed; K = Strikeouts

Player	W	L	ERA	G	GS	SV	IP	H	R	ER	HR	BB	K
Julio Teherán	11	13	4.49	32	32	0	188.1	186	103	94	31	72	151
R. A. Dickey	10	10	4.26	31	31	0	190.0	193	99	90	26	67	136
Mike Foltynewicz	10	13	4.79	29	28	0	154.0	169	86	82	20	59	143
Jim Johnson	6	3	5.56	61	0	22	56.2	59	39	35	8	25	61
**Arodys Vizcaíno**	5	3	2.83	62	0	14	57.1	42	19	18	7	21	64
Rex Brothers	4	3	7.23	27	0	0	23.2	23	19	19	3	12	33
**Sean Newcomb**	4	9	4.32	19	19	0	100.0	100	51	48	10	57	108
Jaime García	4	7	4.30	18	18	0	113.0	108	58	54	12	41	85
**Lucas Sims**	3	6	5.62	14	10	0	57.2	64	37	36	9	23	44
José Ramírez	2	3	3.19	68	0	0	62.0	45	26	22	9	29	56
Sam Freeman	2	0	2.55	58	0	0	60.0	48	19	17	3	27	59
Ian Krol	2	2	5.33	51	0	0	49.0	50	34	29	8	21	44
Luke Jackson	2	0	4.62	43	0	0	50.2	55	26	26	4	19	33
Bartolo Colón	2	8	8.14	13	13	0	63.0	92	66	57	11	20	42
Jason Motte	1	0	3.54	46	0	0	40.2	28	16	16	6	20	27
Luiz Gohara	1	3	4.91	5	5	0	29.1	32	17	16	2	8	31
**Max Fried**	1	1	3.81	9	4	0	26.0	30	15	11	3	12	22
Dan Winkler	1	1	2.51	16	0	0	14.1	7	4	4	1	6	18
Jason Hursh	1	0	5.06	9	0	0	10.2	13	6	6	1	4	7
**Matt Wisler**	0	1	8.35	20	1	0	32.1	43	31	30	5	13	22
Eric O'Flaherty	0	0	7.85	22	0	0	18.1	20	16	16	4	9	15
Josh Collmenter	0	2	9.00	11	0	0	17.0	29	19	17	7	6	18
**A. J. Minter**	0	1	3.00	16	0	0	15.0	13	5	5	1	2	26
Akeel Morris	0	0	1.23	8	0	0	7.1	6	1	1	0	4	9
Aaron Blair	0	1	15.00	1	1	0	3.0	5	5	5	1	5	3
Chaz Roe	0	0	9.00	3	0	0	2.0	3	4	2	0	2	1
**Team totals**	**72**	**90**	**4.72**	**162**	**162**	**36**	**1441.1**	**1463**	**821**	**756**	**192**	**584**	**1258**

== Farm system ==
Level	Team	League	Manager
AAA	Gwinnett Braves	International League	Damon Berryhill
AA	Mississippi Braves	Southern League	Luis Salazar
A-Advanced	Florida Fire Frogs	Florida State League	Paul Runge
A	Rome Braves	South Atlantic League	Randy Ingle
Rookie	Danville Braves	Appalachian League	Nestor Pérez
Rookie	GCL Braves	Gulf Coast League	Barrett Kleinknecht
Rookie	DSL Braves	Dominican Summer League	
