= Danny Santana =

Dominican baseball player (born 1990)

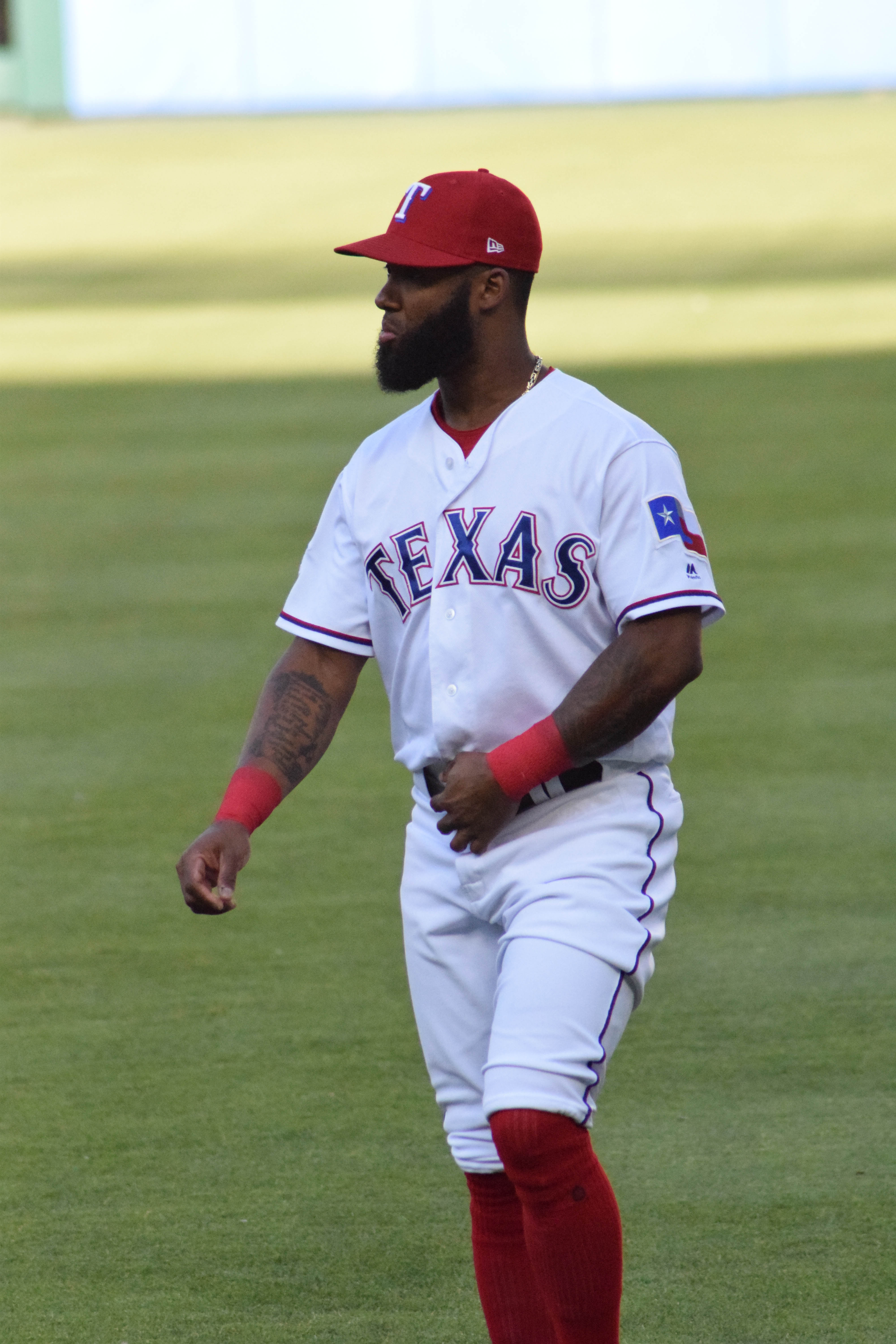
- Santana with the Texas Rangers

Free agent
- Infielder / Outfielder
- Born: November 7, 1990 (age 36); Monte Plata, Dominican Republic
- Bats: Switch Throws: Right

MLB debut
- May 5, 2014, for the Minnesota Twins

MLB statistics (through 2021 season)
- Batting average: .255
- Home runs: 47
- Runs batted in: 202
- Stolen bases: 75
- Stats at Baseball Reference

Teams
- Minnesota Twins (2014–2017); Atlanta Braves (2017–2018); Texas Rangers (2019–2020); Boston Red Sox (2021)

Daniel Ernesto Santana (born November 7, 1990) is a Dominican professional baseball infielder and outfielder who is a free agent. He has previously played in Major League Baseball (MLB) for the Minnesota Twins, Atlanta Braves, Texas Rangers, and Boston Red Sox.

== Career ==
=== Minnesota Twins ===
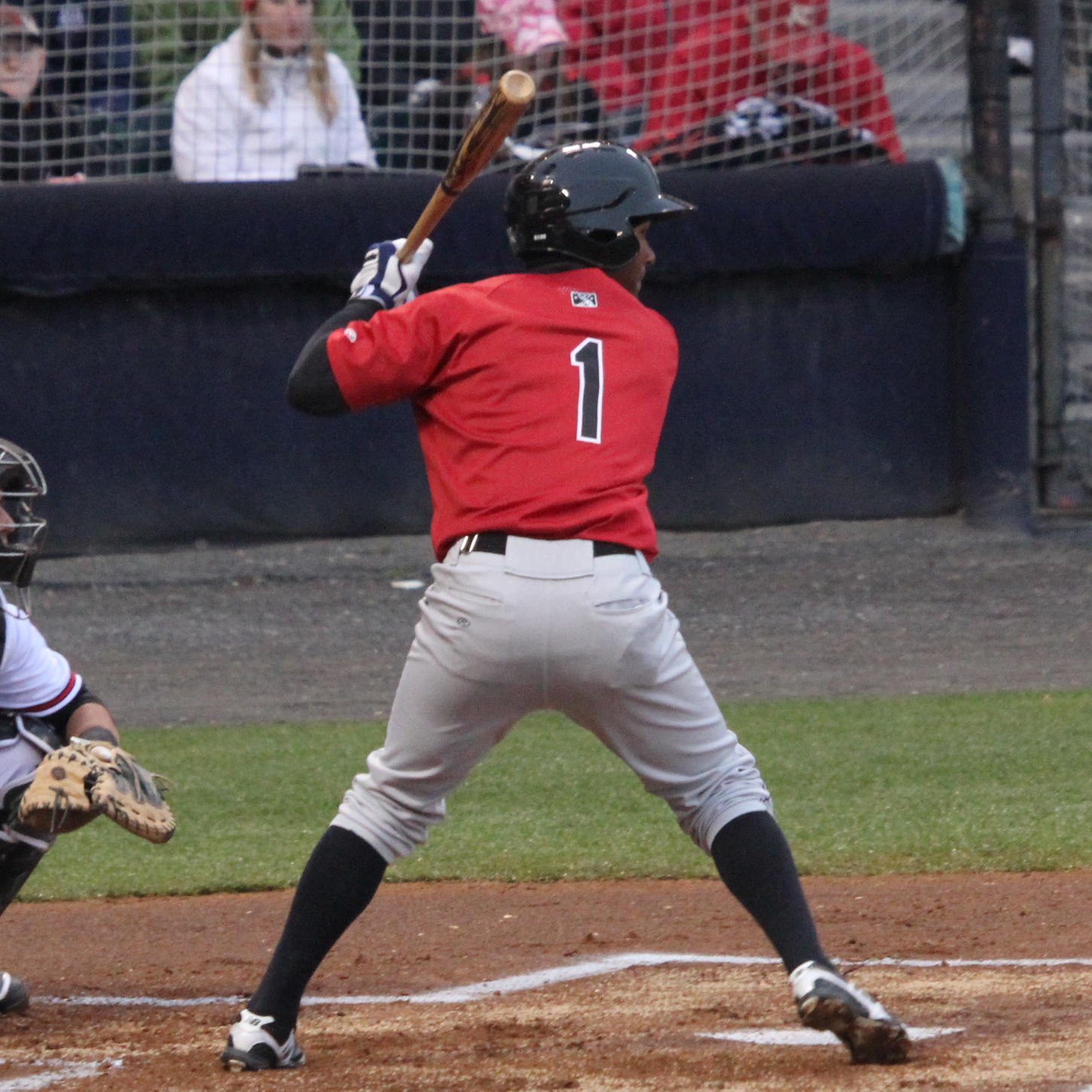
Santana batting for the New Britain Rock Cats in 2013

The Minnesota Twins signed Santana as an undrafted free agent in December 2007. In November 2012, the Twins added him to the 40-man roster in order to protect him from the Rule 5 draft.

Santana was called up to the major leagues for the first time on May 2, 2014. After a solid start to his career, Santana was placed on the 15-day disabled list on June 27. He spent the season splitting time between center field and shortstop, and he accumulated a .319 batting average, 7 home runs, 20 stolen bases in 101 games, leading all rookies. He finished seventh in American League Rookie of the Year Award voting. Additionally, Santana's rookie year batting average of .319 is a Twins franchise record (minimum 130 at bats).

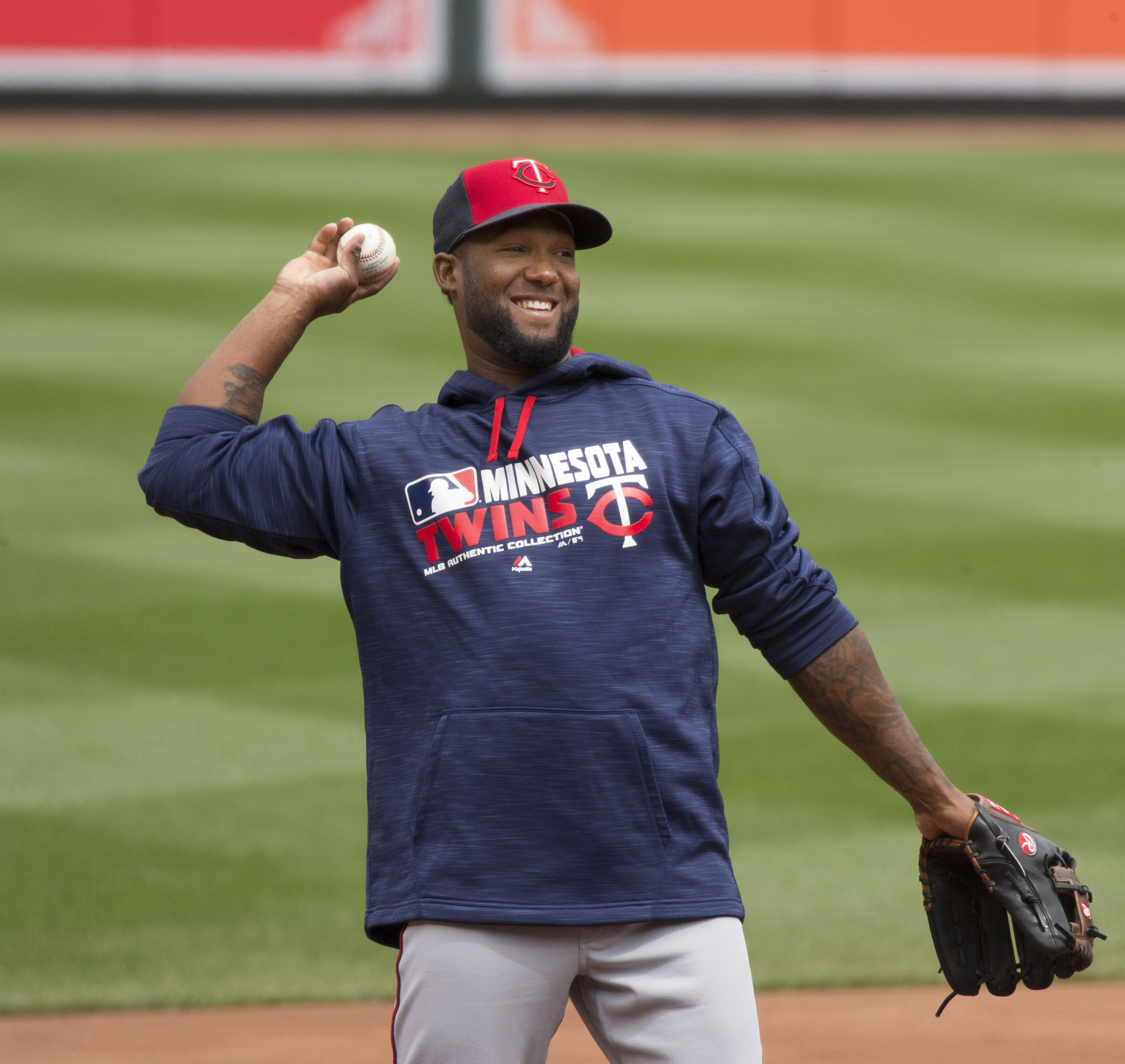
Santana with the Minnesota Twins in 2016

Santana began the 2015 season as the Twins' shortstop. He regressed throughout the season, being demoted to the Triple-A Rochester Red Wings. He finished the major league season hitting just .215 with no home runs. Santana continued to see his playing time decrease in 2016 due to other players on the team performing better. Despite this, Santana continued to see playing time at shortstop, but an injury cost him half the season. He was designated for assignment on May 5, 2017.

=== Atlanta Braves ===
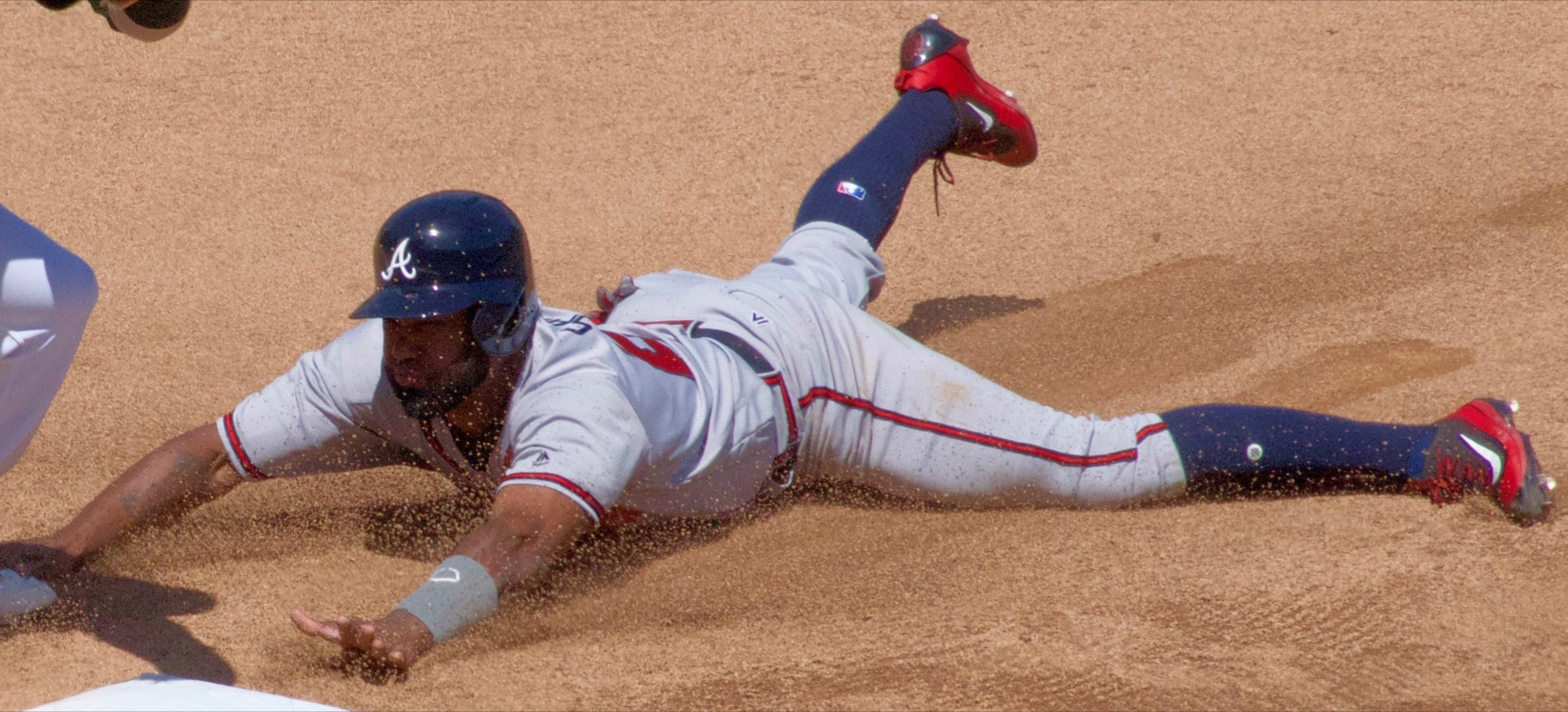
Santana with the Atlanta Braves in 2017

On May 8, 2017, Santana was traded to the Atlanta Braves in exchange for Kevin Chapman. He elected free agency on December 1, 2017, but was resigned to a minor league deal later that month. Santana was assigned to the Triple-A Gwinnett Stripers to begin the 2018 season, and was called up to Atlanta on June 22. He was designated for assignment on July 19, and was outrighted on July 22. He elected free agency after the season.

=== Texas Rangers ===
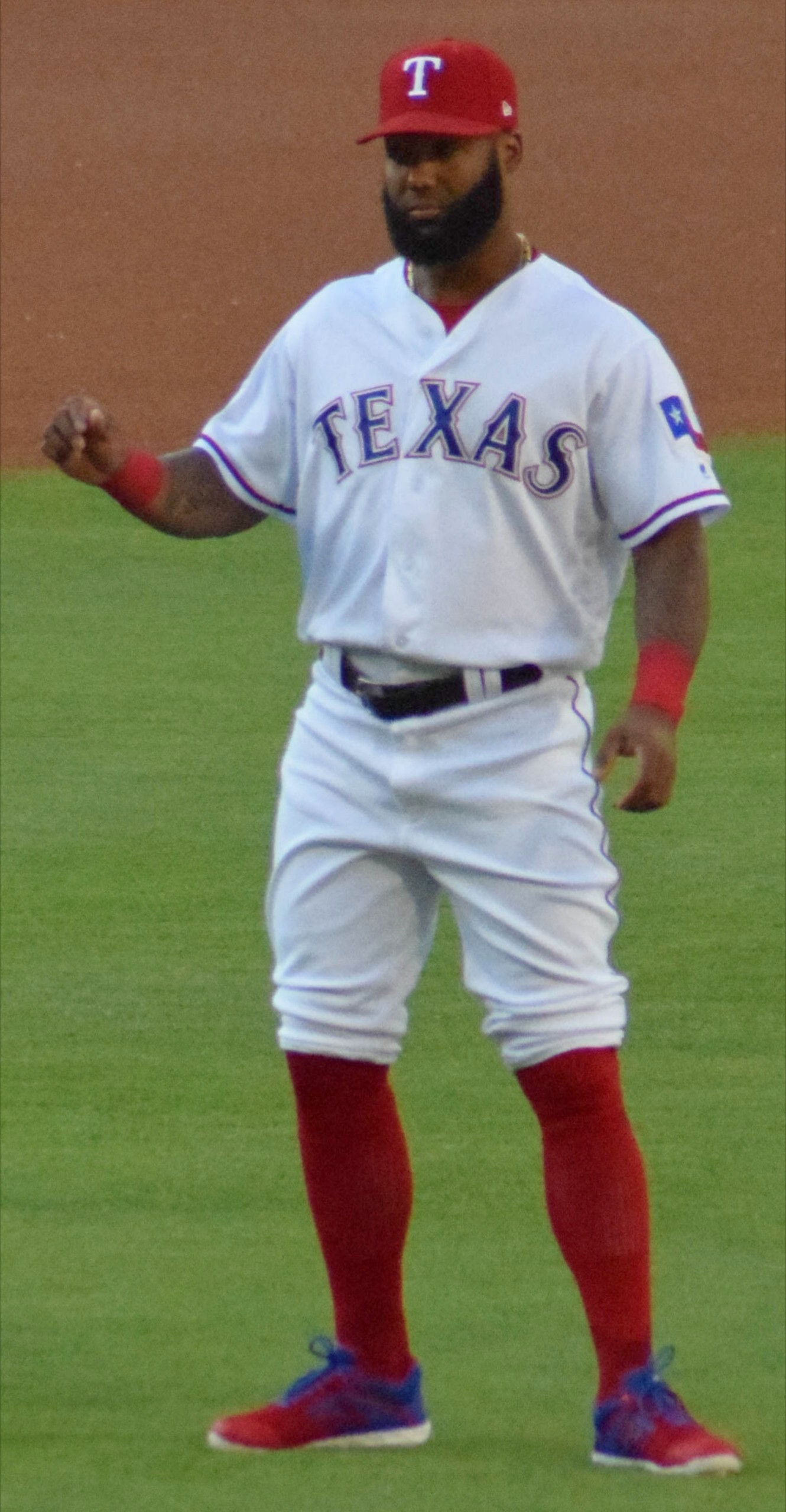
Santana with the Texas Rangers in 2019

On January 9, 2019, Santana signed a minor league contract, which included an invitation to major league spring training, with the Texas Rangers. He was assigned to the Triple-A Nashville Sounds to open the 2019 season. His contract was purchased on April 13, and he was added to the major league roster. Santana played in 130 games for the Rangers in 2019, slashing .283/.324/.534 with 28 home runs and 81 RBI in 474 at-bats.

Santana only played in 15 contests for the Rangers in 2020, hitting .145/.238/.273 with 1 home run and 7 RBI in 55 at-bats. On December 2, 2020, Santana was non-tendered by the Rangers.

=== Boston Red Sox ===
On March 7, 2021, Santana was signed to a minor league contract by the Boston Red Sox, and received a non-roster invitation to spring training. Santana began the year on a rehabilitation assignment with the High-A Greenville Drive, then played in Triple-A with the Worcester Red Sox. On May 21, Santana was added to Boston's active roster. He made his Red Sox debut that night at Citizens Bank Park against the Philadelphia Phillies, hitting a home run in an 11–3 Red Sox win. Santana was placed on the injured list on July 9 due to a left quad strain, was sent on a rehabilitation assignment with Worcester a week later, and was activated on July 19. Santana returned to the injured list on July 22 due to a left groin strain. He was activated on September 1, placed on the COVID-related injured list on September 5, and returned to the team on September 7. On September 11, Santana was again placed on the COVID-related injured list. Overall with Boston during the regular season, Santana played in 38 games while batting .181 with five home runs and 14 RBI. He appeared in five postseason games, batting 0-for-3, as the Red Sox advanced to the American League Championship Series. Santana also appeared in 20 minor league games, batting .343 with six home runs and 12 RBI. On November 3, Santana elected to become a free agent.

On April 4, 2022, Santana was suspended by MLB for 80 games after violation of their Joint Drug Prevention and Treatment Program, testing positive for Boldenone. On July 28, Santana was re-signed by the Red Sox to a minor league contract. In 7 games for the rookie-level Florida Complex League Red Sox, he went 6-for-21 (.286) with no home runs and five RBI. Santana was released by the Red Sox organization on August 20.

=== Guerreros de Oaxaca ===
On April 14, 2025, Santana signed with the Guerreros de Oaxaca of the Mexican League. In 37 appearances for Oaxaca, he batted .306/.422/.421 with two home runs, 18 RBI, and three stolen bases. Santana was released by the Guerreros on June 17.
