= Thomas Burrows =

American baseball player (born 1994)

- Pitcher
- Born: September 14, 1994 (age 30); Florence, Alabama, U.S.
- Bats: Left Throws: Left

Thomas E. Burrows (born September 14, 1994) is an American former professional baseball pitcher. The Seattle Mariners selected Burrows in the fourth round, with the 117th overall selection, of the 2016 MLB draft.

== Career ==
=== Amateur ===
Burrows attended Mars Hill Bible School in Florence, Alabama. As a pitcher for the school's baseball team, he was named to the Alabama Sports Writers Association Super All-State team in 2012 and 2013.

He enrolled at the University of Alabama, where he played college baseball for the Alabama Crimson Tide. He was named a Freshman All-American by the National Collegiate Baseball Writers Association (NCBWA) and Collegiate Baseball Newspaper in 2014. He was also added to the watch list for the NCBWA Stopper of the Year Award. During the summer of 2015, he played collegiate summer baseball for the Hyannis Harbor Hawks of the Cape Cod Baseball League. He set a Crimson Tide record with 30 saves in his collegiate career.

=== Seattle Mariners ===
The Seattle Mariners selected Burrows in the fourth round, with the 117th overall selection, of the 2016 MLB draft. After he signed with the Mariners, he made his professional debut with the Everett AquaSox of the Low–A Northwest League for whom in 24 2/3 innings he had an ERA of 2.55.

=== Atlanta Braves ===
On January 11, 2017, the Mariners traded Burrows and Luiz Gohara to the Atlanta Braves in exchange for Mallex Smith and Shae Simmons. The Braves assigned him to the Rome Braves, where he spent all of 2017, posting a 3–5 record with a 2.16 ERA in 66 2/3 innings pitched. He began the 2018 season with Rome before being promoted to the Florida Fire Frogs of the High–A Florida State League, and finishing the season with the Mississippi Braves of the Double–A Southern League. Over 45 relief appearances between the three clubs, he went 6–2 with a 2.66 ERA. In 2019, he split time between Mississippi and the Triple–A International League Gwinnett Stripers, going 2–4 with a 4.42 ERA and 63 strikeouts over 57 innings.

Burrows did not play in a game in 2020 due to the cancellation of the minor league season because of the COVID-19 pandemic. Burrows began the 2021 season at spring training, and returned to minor league camp in March. He spent the remainder of the year with the Gwinnett Stripers. In 35 games for Gwinnett, he logged a 2.64 ERA with 67 strikeouts across 47 2/3 innings pitched. Burrows returned to Gwinnett in 2022, making 32 appearances out of the bullpen and recording a 4–3 record and 5.50 ERA with 41 strikeouts in 34 1/3 innings. He elected free agency following the season on November 10, 2022.
