= Shae Simmons =

American baseball player (born 1990)

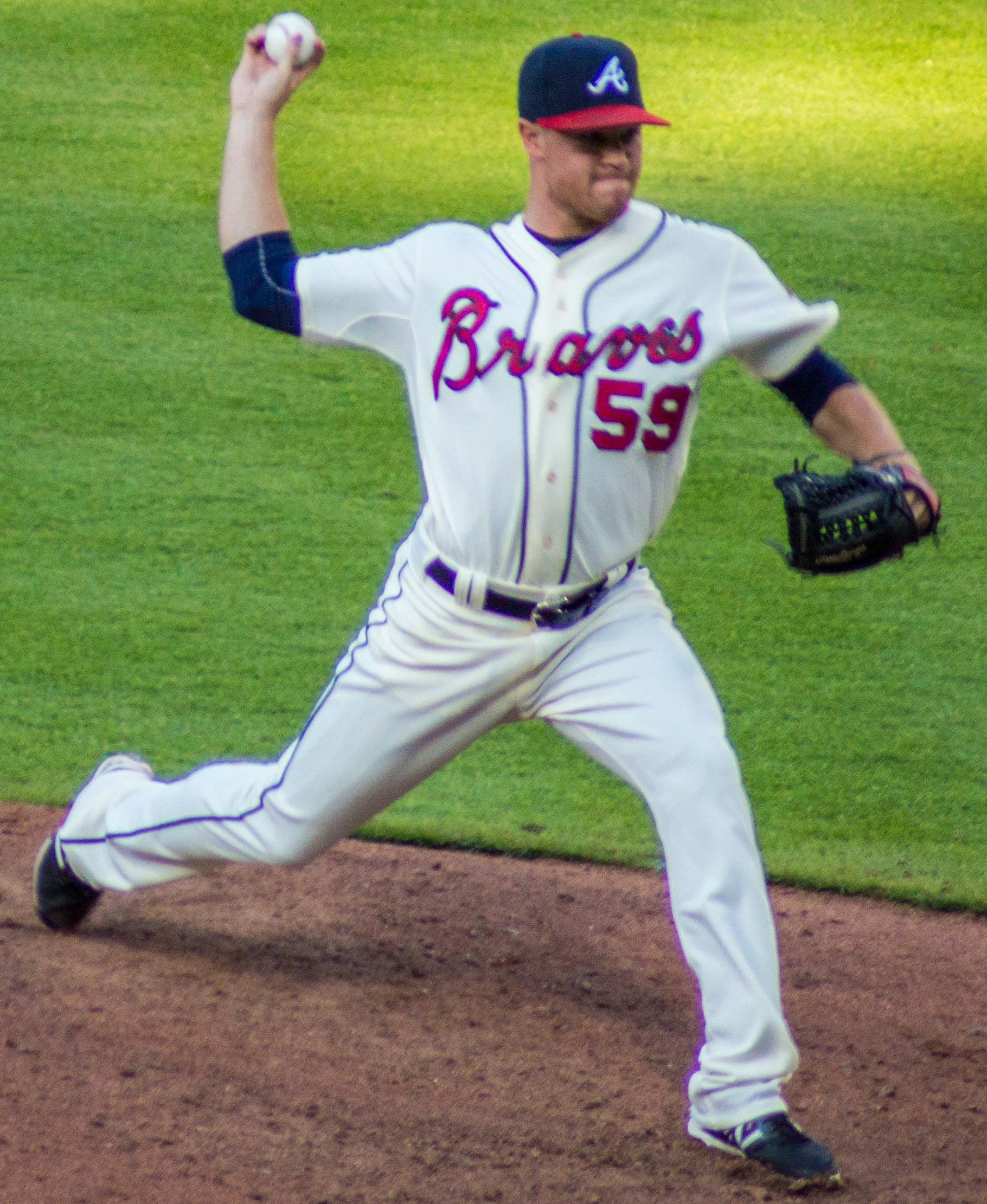
- Simmons with the Atlanta Braves in 2014
- Pitcher
- Born: September 3, 1990 (age 36); Cape Girardeau, Missouri, U.S.
- Batted: Right Threw: Right

MLB debut
- May 31, 2014, for the Atlanta Braves

Last MLB appearance
- October 1, 2017, for the Seattle Mariners

MLB statistics
- Win–loss record: 1–4
- Earned run average: 3.50
- Strikeouts: 34
- Stats at Baseball Reference

Teams
- Atlanta Braves (2014, 2016); Seattle Mariners (2017)

Shae Austin Simmons (born September 3, 1990) is an American former professional baseball pitcher. He played in Major League Baseball (MLB) for the Atlanta Braves and Seattle Mariners.

== Career ==
Simmons attended Scott City High School in Scott City, Missouri and Southeast Missouri State University, where he played college baseball.

=== Atlanta Braves ===
Simmons was drafted by the Atlanta Braves in the 22nd round of the 2012 Major League Baseball draft.

In his first professional season, Simmons pitched for the Danville Braves and Gulf Coast Braves. He appeared in 16 games with a 1.46 earned run average (ERA) and 36 strikeouts in 24 2/3 innings pitched. In 2013, he played for the Rome Braves and Mississippi Braves. He finished the season with a 1.69 ERA and 82 strikeouts over 53 1/3 innings in 50 games. He was named to the South Atlantic League All-Star Game.

In 2014, Simmons was invited to spring training with the Braves. He started the 2014 season back with Double-A Mississippi. He was called up to the major leagues for the first time on May 30, 2014. He made his major league debut the next day, striking out the only batter he faced. On July 19, 2014, Simmons gave up a home run to Phillies shortstop Jimmy Rollins. This marked the first time Simmons had allowed a home run since May 18, 2012, his senior year in college. Simmons was enjoying a successful ride in the Braves bullpen until he landed on the disabled list on July 29 with shoulder soreness. In his first 20 appearances, he had a 0.96 ERA with 19 strikeouts and 6 walks. Simmons told reporters he "held off" telling the Braves about the tightness, thinking it wasn't "too serious". On August 20, he was temporarily shut down following an unsuccessful rehab assignment with Triple-A Gwinnett, and he didn't return to the mound the rest of the season. Despite the abrupt end to his season, he impressed in a mere 21.2 innings, going 1-2 with a 2.91 ERA and 23 strikeouts to only 11 walks.

Expected to enter the season competing for the primary setup role to closer Craig Kimbrel, Simmons received unfortunate news when an MRI revealed a tear to his UCL in his throwing elbow, causing him to miss the entire 2015 season. On February 12, 2015, Simmons underwent successful Tommy John surgery, performed by Dr. James Andrews. He began pitching again in May 2016, but recovery was slow, as he was affected by other minor injuries. The Braves recalled Simmons on August 30.

=== Seattle Mariners ===
On January 11, 2017, Simmons was traded, along with Mallex Smith, to the Seattle Mariners in exchange for minor league pitchers Luiz Gohara and Thomas Burrows. He made nine appearances for the Mariners, posting an 0-2 record and 7.04 ERA with eight strikeouts across 7 2/3 innings pitched. On December 1, Simmons was non-tendered by Seattle, and became a free agent.

=== Chicago Cubs ===
On February 14, 2018, Simmons signed a one-year split contract with the Chicago Cubs. Simmons was placed on waivers on June 26, and was outrighted on June 27, but rather than accept the assignment, he rejected it in favor of free agency.
