= Luiz Gohara =

Brazilian baseball player (born 1996)

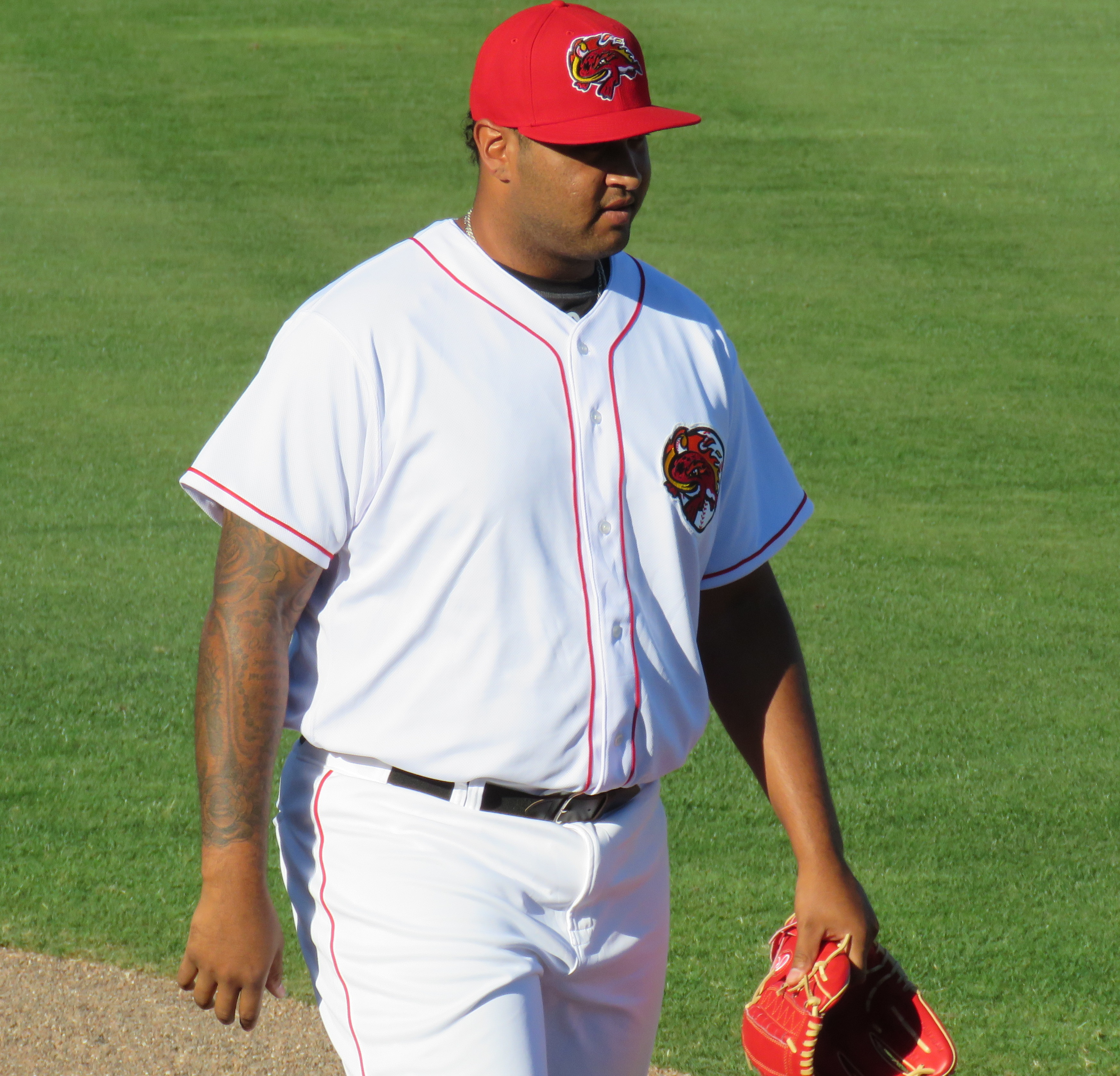
- Gohara with the Florida Fire Frogs in 2017
- Pitcher
- Born: July 31, 1996 (age 29); Tupã, São Paulo, Brazil
- Batted: Left Threw: Left

MLB debut
- September 6, 2017, for the Atlanta Braves

Last MLB appearance
- July 8, 2018, for the Atlanta Braves

MLB statistics
- Win–loss record: 1–4
- Earned run average: 5.33
- Strikeouts: 49
- Stats at Baseball Reference

Teams
- Atlanta Braves (2017–2018)

Luiz Henrique Gohara (born July 31, 1996) is a Brazilian former professional baseball pitcher who played in Major League Baseball (MLB) for the Atlanta Braves in 2017 and 2018.

== Career ==
=== Seattle Mariners ===
Gohara signed with the Seattle Mariners for $880,000 as an international free agent on August 14, 2012. He was originally on Brazil's roster for the 2013 World Baseball Classic, however he left the team before the competition started. He made his professional debut that season for the Pulaski Mariners, going 1–2 with a 4.15 ERA in 2013.

In 2014, Gohara pitched for the rookie-level Arizona League Mariners and Low-A Northwest League Everett AquaSox, going a combined 1–7 with a 6.66 ERA and 53 strikeouts across 13 total starts. In 2015, Gohara made 16 starts split between the Low-A Everett AquaSox and Single-A Clinton LumberKings, posting a combined 3-8 record and 5.54 ERA with 67 strikeouts across 63 1/3 innings pitched.

Gohara returned to Everett and Clinton for the 2016 season, making 13 starts and compiling an aggregate 7-2 record and 1.81 ERA with 81 strikeouts across 69 2/3 innings pitched.

=== Atlanta Braves ===
On January 11, 2017, Gohara was traded to the Atlanta Braves, along with pitcher Thomas Burrows, in exchange for outfielder Mallex Smith and pitcher Shae Simmons. He was promoted twice during the 2017 season, joining the Mississippi Braves on May 10, and the Gwinnett Braves in July.

Gohara was called up to the majors for the first time on September 5, 2017. In five starts he was 1–3 with an ERA of 4.91. Gohara missed the entirety of spring training in 2018, and was eventually assigned to the Gwinnett Stripers on April 28. Recalled for the first time that season on May 8, Gohara returned to the minor leagues on June 17. In July 2018, Gohara was called up a second time, only to be sent down before the All-Star Game. He spent the rest of the season at the minor league level, and was placed on the 60-day disabled list in September. Gohara participated in spring training prior to the 2019 season, and was assigned to the Gwinnett Stripers in March.

Gohara mysteriously did not pitch in the early part of 2019, but it was revealed in late July that he had an arthroscopic procedure on his shoulder to alleviate soreness that he experienced since spring training. No significant tissue damage was discovered. He was designated for assignment on July 31, 2019, to make room for newly acquired Shane Greene. Gohara was released on August 2.

=== Los Angeles Angels ===
On August 28, 2019, Gohara signed a minor league deal with the Los Angeles Angels. He was released on May 29, 2020.

== Personal life ==
He is a Brazilian of Japanese descent. He was born in Tupã, São Paulo to parents Luiz and Maria Gohara. His father was a professional baseball player in Japan and died at the age of 58 in December 2017.
