= Jason Hursh =

American baseball player (born 1991)

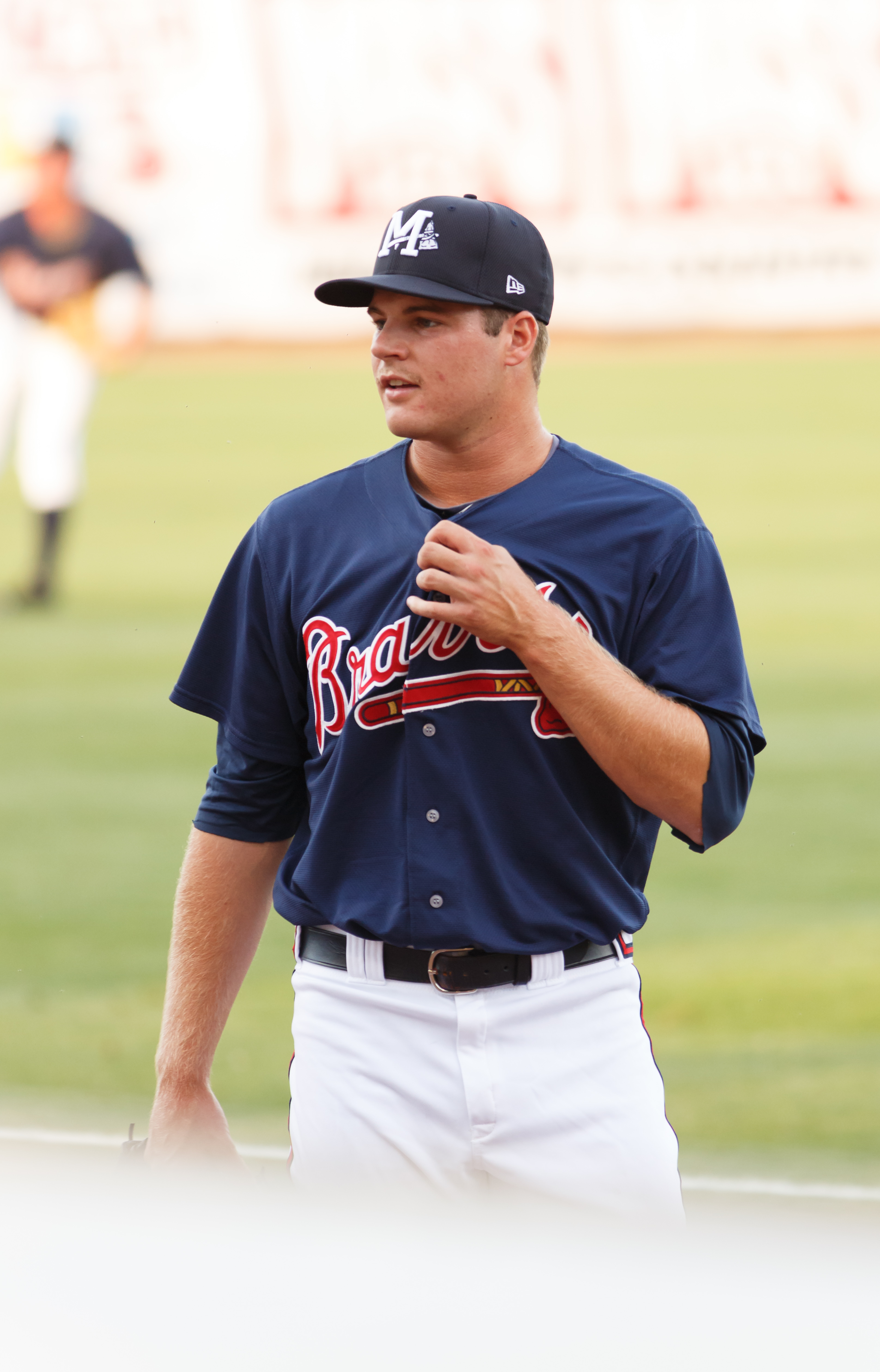
- Hursh with the Mississippi Braves in 2015
- Pitcher
- Born: October 2, 1991 (age 34); Dallas, Texas, U.S.
- Batted: Right Threw: Right

MLB debut
- August 13, 2016, for the Atlanta Braves

Last MLB appearance
- August 3, 2017, for the Atlanta Braves

MLB statistics
- Win–loss record: 1–0
- Earned run average: 8.25
- Strikeouts: 8
- Stats at Baseball Reference

Teams
- Atlanta Braves (2016–2017)

Jason Brewster Hursh (born October 2, 1991) is an American former professional baseball pitcher. He played in Major League Baseball (MLB) for the Atlanta Braves.

== High school and college ==
Hursh attended Trinity Christian Academy in Addison, Texas. After graduating, the Pittsburgh Pirates selected Hursh in the sixth round of the 2010 Major League Baseball (MLB) Draft. Hursh decided not to sign, instead enrolling at Oklahoma State University–Stillwater, to play college baseball for the Oklahoma State Cowboys baseball team. He underwent Tommy John surgery in his sophomore year. As a junior, Hursh pitched to a 6–5 win–loss record with a 2.79 earned run average (ERA) in 16 games started. He was named to the All-Big 12 Conference second team.

== Professional career ==
The Atlanta Braves selected Hursh with the 31st overall selection in the 2013 MLB draft. Hursh signed with the Braves, receiving a $1.7 million signing bonus, and was assigned to the Rome Braves of the Single–A South Atlantic League. With Rome, Hursh had a 0.67 ERA in 27 innings. Hursh began the 2014 season with the Mississippi Braves of the Double–A Southern League. Hursh spent the entire season there, making 26 starts and one relief appearance, with a 3.58 ERA. Hursh spent most of the 2015 season with Mississippi, appearing in 25 games. He was converted to a reliever in July and promoted to the Gwinnett Braves in August. He made 15 starts and ten relief appearances with a 5.14 ERA at the Double–A level. On August 12, 2016, Hursh was promoted to the major leagues for the first time. Six days later, he was optioned to Gwinnett.

Hursh began the 2017 season with Gwinnett and was called up on April 12. He was optioned back to Gwinnett two days later, while Luke Jackson was called up. Hursh would remain at Triple–A until May 11, 2017, when he was demoted to Double–A. After 10 relief appearances at Mississippi during which he had a 1.23 ERA, the Braves recalled Hursh on June 6, replacing the injured Bartolo Colón on the roster. Hursh was optioned to Gwinnett on June 10, when Sean Newcomb was called up. However, he was recalled the following day to replace Eric O'Flaherty. Hursh was optioned back to Gwinnett when Colón was activated from the disabled list on June 28. Hursh was recalled again on July 14, replacing Jason Motte. He was optioned back to Gwinnett three days later when the Braves made a series of roster moves. He was once again recalled on July 27, replacing Aaron Blair who had been optioned. Hursh was optioned back to Gwinnett on August 5, while Max Fried was called up, and was called up on August 30, but would be optioned back the next day. He would not be included in expanded rosters in September.

Hursh began 2018 in major league spring training, but was sent to minor league camp on March 4, 2018. He split the year between Mississippi and Gwinnett, posting a cumulative 2–6 record and 3.71 ERA with 58 strikeouts and 8 saves over 53 appearances. On August 8, 2018, Hursh was removed from the 40-man roster and sent outright to Triple–A Gwinnett.

Hursh spent the entirety of the 2019 campaign with Mississippi, making 34 appearances out of the bullpen and posting a 3–3 record and 3.45 ERA with 32 strikeouts across 47 innings pitched. He elected free agency following the season on November 4, 2019.
