= Lane Adams =

American baseball player (born 1989)

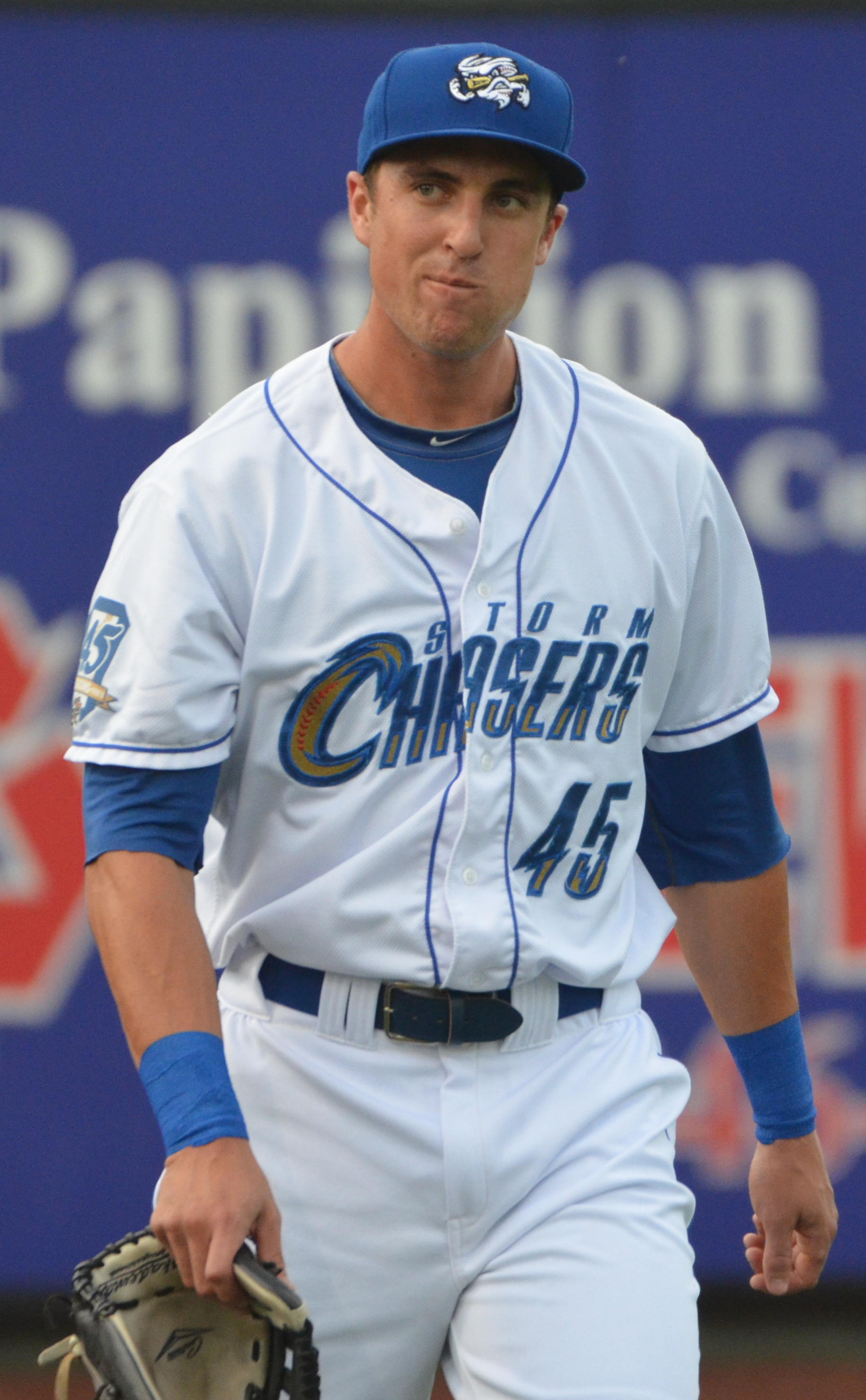
- Adams with the Omaha Storm Chasers in 2013
- Outfielder
- Born: November 13, 1989 (age 36); Talihina, Oklahoma, U.S.
- Batted: Right Threw: Right

MLB debut
- September 1, 2014, for the Kansas City Royals

Last MLB appearance
- September 30, 2018, for the Atlanta Braves

MLB statistics
- Batting average: .263
- Home runs: 7
- Runs batted in: 26
- Stats at Baseball Reference

Teams
- Kansas City Royals (2014); Atlanta Braves (2017–2018)

Lane Weston Adams (born November 13, 1989) is an American former professional baseball outfielder. He played in Major League Baseball (MLB) for the Kansas City Royals and Atlanta Braves.

== Early life ==
Adams is a Red Oak, Oklahoma native. He is part Native American and a member of Choctaw Nation of Oklahoma.

Adams attended Red Oak High School in Red Oak. Playing guard for the school's basketball team, he scored 3,251 points, making him the fifth-highest scorer in Oklahoma high school basketball history. His 93.7% free throw percentage as a junior led all of Oklahoma. He committed to attend Missouri State University on a basketball scholarship.

== Career ==
=== Kansas City Royals ===
The Royals selected Adams in the 13th round of the 2009 MLB draft, and he signed with the Royals for a $225,000 signing bonus rather than attend college.

Adams was a 2012 Midwest League Mid-Season All Star. He played for the Northwest Arkansas Naturals of the Class AA Texas League in 2013. He was a 2013 MiLB Royals Organization All Star, and was named Royals’ 2013 co-Minor League Player of the Year with pitcher Yordano Ventura. After the 2013 season, the Royals added Adams to their 40-man roster.

In 2014, playing for the Northwest Arkansas Naturals he batted .269/.352/.427 with 65 runs (tied for 6th in the league), 25 doubles (tied for 5th), 38 stolen bases (3rd) while being caught 6 times, and 9 hit by pitch (tied for 6th) in 524 at bats. Adams was a Mid-Season Texas League All Star and Post-Season All Star. On September 1, 2014, the Royals promoted Adams to the major leagues. He made his Major League debut that night, replacing Raúl Ibañez as a pinch runner in the eighth inning of the Royals' game against the Texas Rangers.

In 2015, again playing for the Northwest Arkansas Naturals, Adams batted .298/.360/.466 with 29 stolen bases (tied for 4th in the league) while being caught 6 times in 373 at bats. He was released in November 2015.

=== New York Yankees ===
After the 2015 season, the New York Yankees claimed Adams off of waivers. In 2016 for the Trenton Thunder he batted .253/.343/.363 with 31 stolen bases in 36 attempts in 289 at bats. On July 28, 2016, he was released by the Yankees. He contemplated retiring at 26 years of age.

=== Chicago Cubs ===
On August 3, 2016, Adams signed a minor league contract with the Chicago Cubs organization. Playing for the Tennessee Smokies, he batted .325/.378/.506 with 9 stolen bases without being caught, in 83 at bats. Adams elected free agency following the season on November 7.

=== Atlanta Braves ===
Adams signed a minor league contract with the Atlanta Braves organization on December 13, 2016. Braves manager Brian Snitker said: “I didn’t know who he was. I’d never heard of him.” With the Gwinnett Stripers in 2017, he batted .264/.320/.461 with 15 stolen bases in 18 attempts, in 178 at bats.

The Braves promoted him to the Major Leagues on April 25, 2017. Adams recorded his first major league hit in a game against the Milwaukee Brewers four days later. Adams hit his first major league home run, a three-run shot, against the San Francisco Giants on June 22. On September 10, Adams hit a 2-run, walk off home run against the Miami Marlins in the 11th inning. The home run clinched the NL East for the Washington Nationals. For the 2017 season with the Braves, he batted .275/.339/.468, and was successful in all 10 of his stolen base attempts, in 109 at bats.

On April 19, 2018, Adams was designated for assignment by the Braves. He refused an assignment to the Gwinnett Stripers and elected free agency on April 27.

=== Chicago Cubs (second stint) ===
On May 5, 2018, Adams signed a minor league deal with the Chicago Cubs. He hit .325 in 22 games for the Double–A Tennessee Smokies and .231 in 7 games for the Triple–A Iowa Cubs. Adams was released by the Cubs organization on June 30.

=== Atlanta Braves (second stint) ===
On July 16, 2018, Adams signed a minor league deal with the Atlanta Braves. He was called up to the major leagues on September 1. With the Braves in 2018, he batted .240/.345/.520 with one steal in 25 at bats. The Braves outrighted him to the minors on October 31. He elected free agency on November 2.

Through 2018, in his major league career Adams had batted .263/.333/.467 with 11 stolen bases without being caught, in 137 at bats. In his minor league career he had batted .264/.338/.403 with 235 stolen bases while being caught 44 times, in 3,718 at bats.

=== Philadelphia Phillies ===
On January 14, 2019, Adams signed a minor league contract with the Philadelphia Phillies. He played for the Triple–A Lehigh Valley IronPigs, batting .255/.340/.465 with 12 home runs and 29 RBIs in 271 at bats, as he stole eight bases in ten attempts. He was released on July 1, 2019.

=== Atlanta Braves (third stint) ===
On July 31, 2019, Adams signed a minor league deal with the Atlanta Braves. In 18 games for the Double–A Mississippi Braves, he went 3–for–39 (.077) with three RBI and two stolen bases. Adams elected free agency following the season on November 4.

=== Minnesota Twins ===
On February 17, 2020, Adams signed a minor league deal with the Minnesota Twins. Adams did not play in a game in 2020 due to the cancellation of the minor league season because of the COVID-19 pandemic. He became a free agent on November 2.

=== Acereros de Monclova ===
On May 20, 2021, Adams signed with the Acereros de Monclova of the Mexican League. Adams hit .263/.324/.326 with 11 RBI in 26 games, but was released on June 21.

=== Tigres de Quintana Roo ===
On June 24, 2021, Adams signed with the Tigres de Quintana Roo of the Mexican League. In 9 games for Quintana Roo, he went 2–for–25 (.080) with no home runs and one RBI.

Adams retired from professional baseball following the season and later became a private hitting instructor.
