= Mallex Smith =

American baseball player (born 1993)

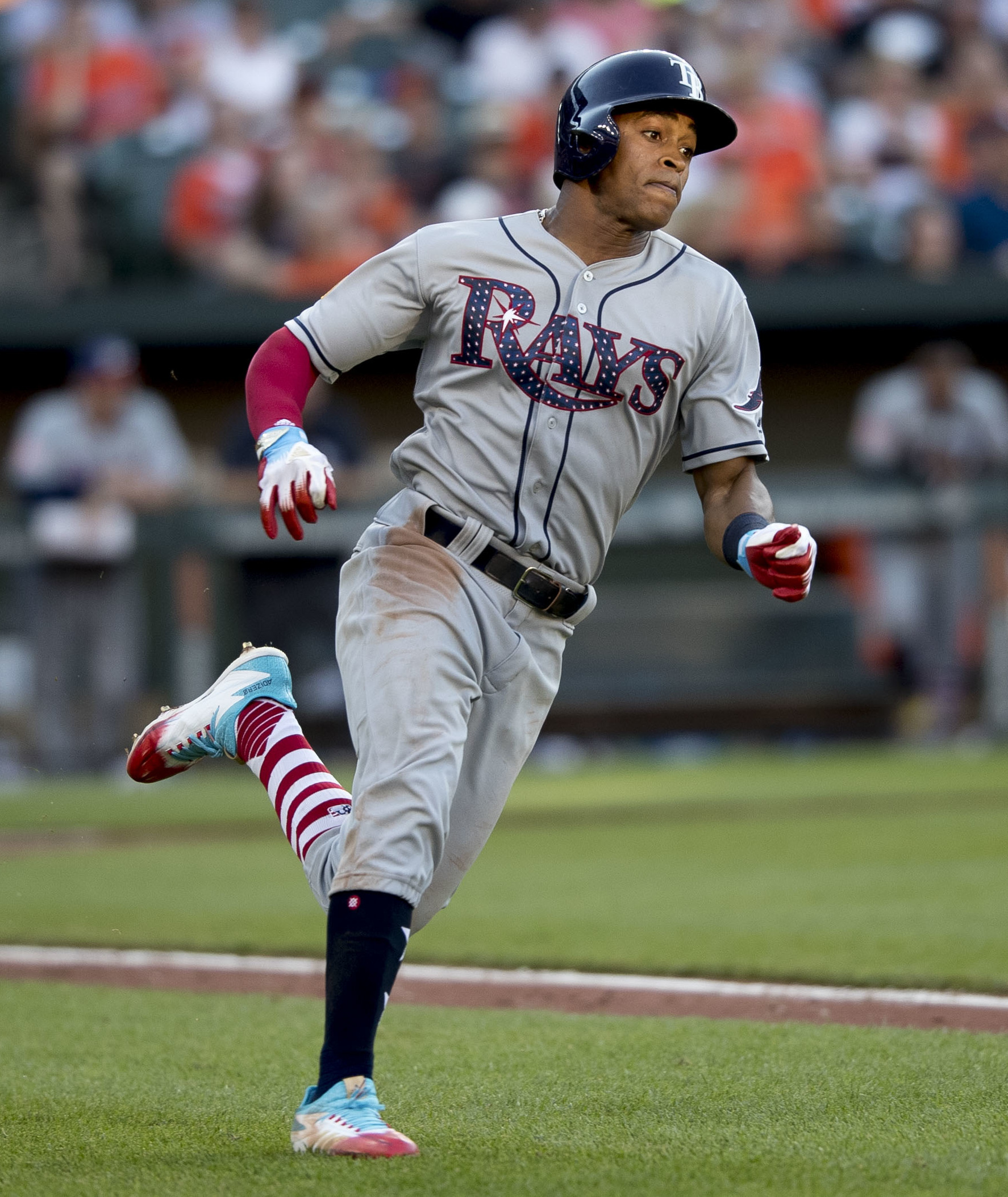
- Smith with the Tampa Bay Rays in 2017

Shenzhen Bluesox – No. 0
- Outfielder
- Born: May 6, 1993 (age 33); Tallahassee, Florida, U.S.
- Bats: Left Throws: Right

MLB debut
- April 11, 2016, for the Atlanta Braves

MLB statistics (through 2020 season)
- Batting average: .255
- Home runs: 13
- Runs batted in: 114
- Stolen bases: 120
- Stats at Baseball Reference

Teams
- Atlanta Braves (2016); Tampa Bay Rays (2017–2018); Seattle Mariners (2019–2020)

Career highlights and awards
- AL stolen base leader (2019)

Mallex Lydell Smith (born May 6, 1993) is an American professional baseball outfielder for the Shenzhen Bluesox of Chinese Professional Baseball. He has previously played in Major League Baseball (MLB) for the Atlanta Braves, Tampa Bay Rays, and Seattle Mariners.

Smith played college baseball at Santa Fe College. He was drafted in the fifth round of the 2013 MLB draft by the San Diego Padres. In the 2014 offseason, he was traded to Atlanta, where he made his MLB debut on April 11, 2016. On January 11, 2017, Smith was traded to the Mariners, who then traded him to the Rays on the same day. Smith had a breakout season in 2018, making the Opening Day roster and hitting .296/.367/.406 in a career-high 141 games with a 3.5 bWAR. Following the 2018 season, he was traded back to the Seattle Mariners, where he played for two seasons. Smith played in the Mexican Baseball League in 2023 and 2025.

== Early life ==
Smith was born in Tallahassee, Florida on May 6, 1993, as one of four children to Michael and Loretta Smith. He attended James S. Rickards High School, where he played football as a safety, along with baseball.

Smith was drafted by the Milwaukee Brewers in the 13th round of the 2011 Major League Baseball draft out of high school. He did not sign with the Brewers, instead playing college baseball at Santa Fe College. In his only collegiate baseball season, Smith hit for a .380 batting average, 17 extra-base hits, 17 runs batted in, and 31 stolen bases.

== Professional career ==
=== San Diego Padres ===
Smith was drafted by the San Diego Padres in the fifth round of the 2012 Draft. He signed with the Padres for a $375,000 signing bonus and made his professional debut that season with the Arizona League Padres. He also played for the Eugene Emeralds in 2012, hitting .305 with two home runs and 17 stolen bases between the two teams.

Smith opened the 2013 season with the Fort Wayne TinCaps. He played in 110 games, hitting .262/.367/.340 with four home runs and 64 stolen bases. The stolen bases were one short of the TinCaps record. Smith started 2014 back with Fort Wayne. During the season, he was promoted to the Lake Elsinore Storm. He finished the year hitting .310 with five home runs and led all minor league players in stolen bases with 88.

=== Atlanta Braves ===
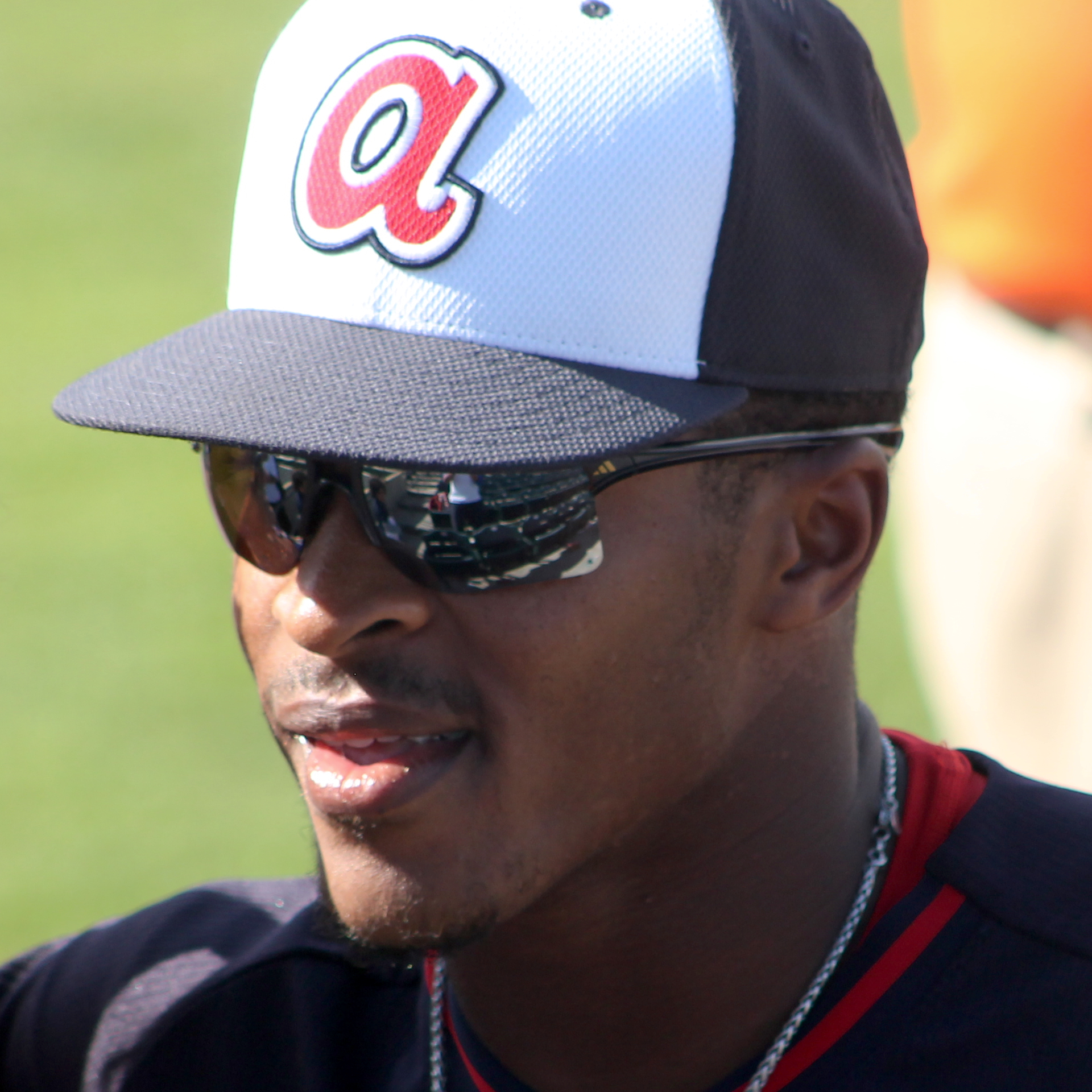
Smith with the Braves during spring training in 2015

On December 19, 2014, the Padres traded Smith, Dustin Peterson, Max Fried, and Jace Peterson to the Atlanta Braves for Justin Upton and Aaron Northcraft. Smith was invited to attend spring training with the Braves, despite not having any Double-A experience at the time. He began the 2015 season with the Mississippi Braves, appearing in 57 games, hitting for a .340 batting average and a .418 on-base percentage, before being promoted to the Gwinnett Braves of the Triple-A International League in June. Smith finished the season at Triple-A, hitting .306, with a .706 on base plus slugging percentage for the year. He was named the Braves' Minor League Player of the Year for all levels and added to 40-man roster after the season.

Smith started the 2016 season with Gwinnett. The Braves promoted Smith to the major leagues on April 11, 2016. He debuted that night against the Washington Nationals, starting in center field. Smith went 1-for-3 in his first game, with a strikeout and a single against Max Scherzer. Smith's helmet lacerated his forehead on a stolen base attempt in the fourth inning, and he left the game. Two days later, Smith recorded his first stolen base, also against Washington. His first career RBI on April 17 helped the Braves sweep the Miami Marlins. Smith hit his first career home run off New York Mets pitcher Matt Harvey on May 3. On June 20, Smith fractured his thumb after Mets pitcher Antonio Bastardo hit him with a fastball. The next day, Smith was placed on the disabled list and expected to miss eight to ten weeks of the season. After a July reevaluation, his return date was moved to September. Braves interim manager Brian Snitker later stated Smith would likely miss the remainder of the season. However, Smith returned on September 17, with two weeks left in the regular season, to serve as a bench player.

Smith began the 2016 offseason with the Naranjeros de Hermosillo of the Liga Mexicana del Pacífico and was released in October. He then joined the Indios de Mayagüez of Liga de Béisbol Profesional Roberto Clemente. Smith strained his oblique while playing in Puerto Rico and left the team in December.

=== Tampa Bay Rays ===
==== 2017 ====
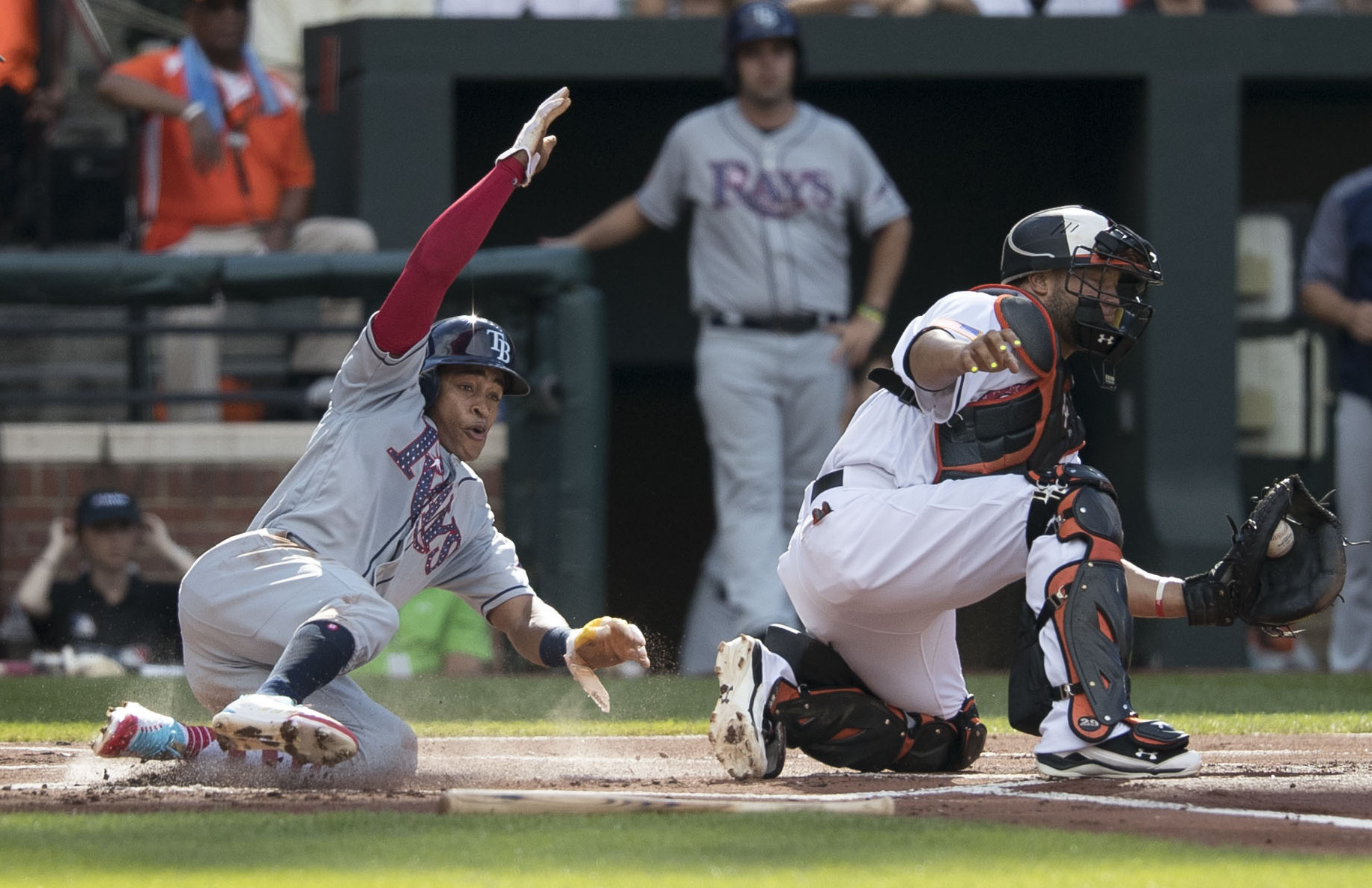
Smith (left) sliding at home plate with the Rays in 2017

On January 11, 2017, the Braves traded Smith and Shae Simmons to the Seattle Mariners for minor-league pitchers Luiz Gohara and Thomas Burrows. That same day, the Mariners traded Smith, Ryan Yarbrough, and Carlos Vargas to the Tampa Bay Rays for Drew Smyly.

With the Braves, Smith had worn uniform number 17, but switched to 0 upon joining the Rays because his preferred number 13 was unavailable. A longtime fan of Friday the 13th, Smith said after his trade to the Rays that the franchise's main character Jason Voorhees represents his effort to be opposing teams' "worst nightmare." Smith has stated of his switch to zero, "My name's kinda different, my game is a little bit different, you know what, I'm gonna go with zero." On April 9, after reaching base five times (a single, double and three walks), stealing two bases, and scoring the walk-off run in a 3–2 victory against the Toronto Blue Jays, Chris Archer coined the term "Mallex Effect" to describe Smith's ability to wreak havoc and change games with his scrappy and speedy play. On August 18, Smith was optioned down to Triple-A Durham to make room for Kevin Kiermaier, who returned from the disabled list. At the time of his demotion, Smith was hitting .279 with 16 stolen bases through 67 games. He was later recalled, and finished the season hitting .270 with 16 stolen bases in 81 games.

==== 2018 ====
Smith made the opening day roster in 2018 with the plan to platoon with Denard Span in left field. Smith began wearing a large Florida shaped gold chain in order to represent his Florida roots. After an injury to Kiermaier, he became the starting center fielder. Due to his play and the trade of Denard Span, Smith began playing every day upon Kiermaier's return. By the All-Star break, Smith set a career high in games played at 86. On August 26, Smith was placed on the 10-day disabled list with a viral infection. At this time, Smith was seventh in the American League with a .307 batting average and fourth with 27 steals. Smith was announced as a nominee for the Roberto Clemente Award, which recognizes a player who best represents the game of baseball through extraordinary character, community involvement, philanthropy and positive contributions on and off the field. Smith was also named the winner of the Paul C. Smith Champion Award, given to the Rays player who best exemplifies the spirit of true professionalism. Smith ended his breakout season setting career highs: he slashed .296/.367/.406 in 544 plate appearances over 141 games (which led the team), recording 40 stolen bases (second in the American League), 10 triples (tied for most in the American League), 65 runs, and 40 runs batted in. Smith also ended the season with 3.5 Wins Above Replacement, the second highest among Rays position players, behind Joey Wendle, according to Baseball Reference.

=== Seattle Mariners ===
==== 2019 ====
On November 8, 2018, the Rays traded Smith back to the Mariners along with minor leaguer Jake Fraley for Mike Zunino, Guillermo Heredia, and Michael Plassmeyer. During spring training, Smith injured the flexor bundle in his right arm when overdoing his throwing routine, sidelining him for the 2019 Opening Series in Tokyo, Japan. However, Smith returned in time for the Mariners home opener on March 28, going 1-for-5 in his Mariners debut. On April 30, Smith was optioned to Triple-A Tacoma after hitting just .165/.255/.247 and struggling defensively during the first month of the season. After hitting .333 with three doubles and a home run in 10 games in Tacoma, Smith was called back up on May 16.

In 2019, Smith batted .227/.300/.335, had the highest soft contact percentage of all major league batters (25.0%), and led the major leagues with 46 stolen bases.

==== 2020 ====
Smith was outrighted from the Mariners 40-man roster on September 11, 2020. At the time of his removal from the roster, he had hit .133/.170/.178 over 47 plate appearances for the Mariners. Smith elected free agency on September 28.

=== New York Mets ===
On November 4, 2020, Smith signed a minor league deal with the New York Mets. He batted .211 in spring training but did not play in a regular season game before the Mets released him on May 28, 2021.

=== Cincinnati Reds ===
On June 18, 2021, Smith signed a minor league contract with the Cincinnati Reds organization. In 22 games with the Triple-A Louisville Bats, Smith hit .231 with 1 home run and 5 RBIs.

=== Toronto Blue Jays ===
On August 14, 2021, Smith was traded to the Toronto Blue Jays. He was assigned to the Triple-A Buffalo Bisons. On November 29, Smith signed a minor league contract with the Blue Jays and was invited to 2022 spring training. He was released on June 2, 2022.

=== Kansas City Monarchs ===
On June 12, 2022, Smith signed with the Kansas City Monarchs of the American Association of Professional Baseball. He appeared in 27 games, slashing .281/.374/.368 with 2 home runs and 6 RBI. Smith was released on October 4.

=== Saraperos de Saltillo ===
On January 31, 2023, Smith re-signed with the Monarchs. However, on February 8, he signed with the Saraperos de Saltillo of the Mexican League. In 13 games, he batted .269/.377/.365 with 1 home run, 2 RBI, and 5 stolen bases. Smith was released by Saltillo on May 24.

=== Mariachis de Guadalajara ===
On June 2, 2023, Smith signed with the Mariachis de Guadalajara of the Mexican League. In 49 games for Guadalajara, Smith batted .340/.397/.449 with one home run, 21 RBI, and 20 stolen bases.

On May 3, 2024, Smith signed with El Águila de Veracruz of the Mexican League. He spent the entire year on the reserve list and did not appear in a game in 2024. Smith was released by Veracruz on January 6, 2025.

On January 15, Smith signed with the Pericos de Puebla of the Mexican League. He was released by the Pericos on March 31.

=== Bravos de León ===
On May 1, 2025, Smith signed with the Bravos de León of the Mexican League. In 11 appearances for León, he batted .231/.318/.282 with four RBI and one stolen base. Smith was released by the Bravos on May 16.

=== Charros de Jalisco ===
On May 17, 2025, Smith was claimed off waivers by the Charros de Jalisco. He made 59 appearances for Jalisco, batting .267/.326/.381 with two home runs, 28 RBI, and 16 stolen bases. On February 17, 2026, Smith was released by the Charros.

=== Cleburne Railroaders ===
On June 3, 2026, Smith signed with the Cleburne Railroaders of the American Association of Professional Baseball. In 50 appearances for the Railroaders, he batted .272/.343/.374 with two home runs, 18 RBI, and 40 stolen bases. On August 2, Smith was released by the Railroaders.

=== Shenzhen Bluesox ===
On August 21, 2026, Smith signed with the Shenzhen Bluesox of Chinese Professional Baseball.
