= 2017 Philadelphia Phillies season =

2017 Philadelphia Phillies
- League: National League
- Division: East
- Ballpark: Citizens Bank Park
- City: Philadelphia, Pennsylvania
- Record: 66–96 (.407)
- Divisional place: 5th
- Owners: John Middleton, Bill Giles, David Montgomery
- General managers: Matt Klentak
- Managers: Pete Mackanin
- Television: NBC Sports Philadelphia; Comcast Network Philadelphia; NBC Philadelphia (Tom McCarthy, John Kruk, Ben Davis, Mike Schmidt, Gregg Murphy)
- Radio: Phillies Radio Network; WIP SportsRadio 94.1 FM (English) (Scott Franzke, Larry Andersen, Jim Jackson); WTTM (Spanish) (Danny Martinez, Bill Kulik, Rickie Ricardo)
- Stats: ESPN.com; Baseball Reference

The 2017 Philadelphia Phillies season was the 135th season in the history of the franchise, and its 14th season at Citizens Bank Park. The Phillies opened the season against the Cincinnati Reds at the Great American Ball Park on April 3 and finished the season on October 1 against the New York Mets in Philadelphia. They were coached by Pete Mackanin in his third year as manager of the Phillies. On September 17, 2017, the Phillies were mathematically eliminated from postseason contention. They finished the season 66–96 to finish in last place in the National League East for the third time in four seasons, failing to make the playoffs for the sixth consecutive year.

Manager Pete Mackanin was reassigned to a front office position following the season.

== Offseason ==
The Phillies made several moves over the offseason to bolster the bullpen and add a veteran presence to the lineup. On November 4, the Phillies acquired relief pitcher Pat Neshek from the Houston Astros for a player to be named later. A few days later, Darin Ruf and Darnell Sweeney were traded to the Los Angeles Dodgers for left fielder Howie Kendrick. Andrés Blanco signed a one-year, $3 million contract to return to the Phillies on December 14. On January 19, the Phillies signed free agent outfielder Michael Saunders to a one-year deal.

Matt Stairs was hired as the team's hitting coach in the offseason. He replaced Steve Henderson, who had served in the role since 2013.

== Regular season ==
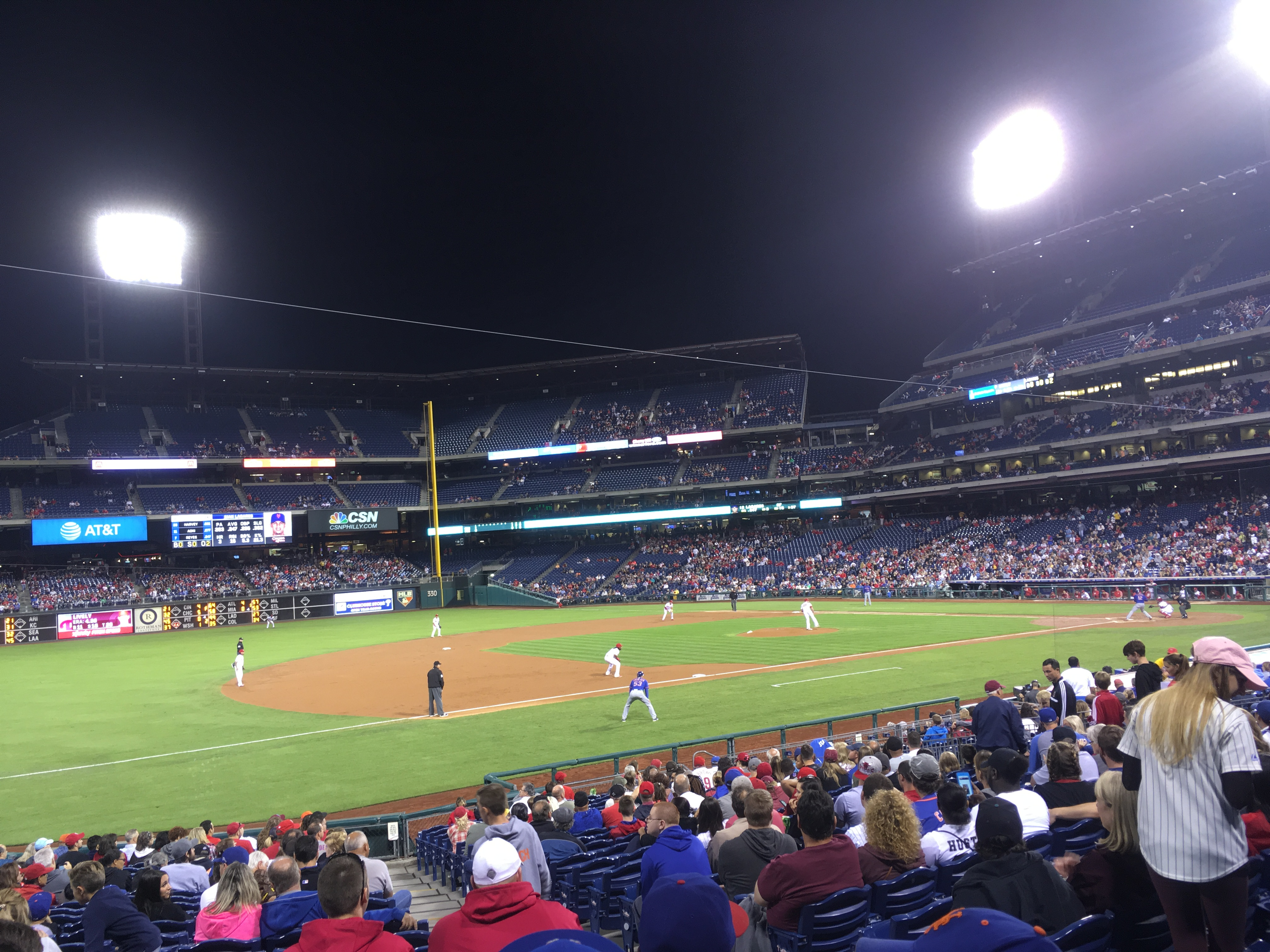
The Phillies take on the New York Mets at Citizens Bank Park on September 29. The Phillies won, 6–2.

=== April ===
For the second consecutive season, the Phillies faced the Cincinnati Reds on the road to start the season. The Phillies won the game 4–3, behind a leadoff home run by César Hernández; the first Opening Day leadoff home run for the Phillies since 1938.

The Phillies faced the Washington Nationals in their home opener on April 7. The Nationals would win the game 7–6. The next night, the Phillies scored 12 runs in the first inning off of Jeremy Guthrie and Enny Romero en route to a 17–3 victory over Washington. During the same homestand, Clay Buchholz left a game with a torn flexor tendon in his pitching arm. He was placed on the disabled list, and the Phillies called up Zach Eflin to take his place in the rotation.

=== August ===
The Phillies turned a triple play on August 27 in the 5th inning against the reigning World Series champion Chicago Cubs. The Phillies would go on to win the game 6–3.

=== Season standings ===
==== National League East ====
NL East
Team	W	L	Pct.	GB	Home	Road
Washington Nationals	97	65	.599	—	47‍–‍34	50‍–‍31
Miami Marlins	77	85	.475	20	42‍–‍36	35‍–‍49
Atlanta Braves	72	90	.444	25	37‍–‍44	35‍–‍46
New York Mets	70	92	.432	27	37‍–‍44	33‍–‍48
Philadelphia Phillies	66	96	.407	31	39‍–‍42	27‍–‍54

==== National League Wild Card ====
Division leaders
Team	W	L	Pct.
Los Angeles Dodgers	104	58	.642
Washington Nationals	97	65	.599
Chicago Cubs	92	70	.568

Wild Card teams (Top 2 teams qualify for postseason)
Team	W	L	Pct.	GB
Arizona Diamondbacks	93	69	.574	+6
Colorado Rockies	87	75	.537	—
Milwaukee Brewers	86	76	.531	1
St. Louis Cardinals	83	79	.512	4
Miami Marlins	77	85	.475	10
Pittsburgh Pirates	75	87	.463	12
Atlanta Braves	72	90	.444	15
San Diego Padres	71	91	.438	16
New York Mets	70	92	.432	17
Cincinnati Reds	68	94	.420	19
Philadelphia Phillies	66	96	.407	21
San Francisco Giants	64	98	.395	23

==== Record vs. opponents ====
2017 National League record Source: MLB Standings Grid – 2017
Team	AZ	ATL	CHC	CIN	COL	LAD	MIA	MIL	NYM	PHI	PIT	SD	SF	STL	WSH	AL
Arizona	—	2–4	3–3	3–3	11–8	11–8	3–4	4–3	6–1	6–1	4–3	11–8	12–7	3–4	2–4	12–8
Atlanta	4–2	—	1–6	3–3	3–4	3–4	11–8	4–2	7–12	6–13	2–5	5–2	4–3	1–5	9–10	9–11
Chicago	3–3	6–1	—	12–7	2–5	2–4	4–3	10–9	4–2	4–3	10–9	2–4	4–3	14–5	3–4	12–8
Cincinnati	3–3	3–3	7–12	—	3–4	0–6	2–5	8–11	3–4	4–2	13–6	3–4	4–3	9–10	1–6	5–15
Colorado	8–11	4–3	5–2	4–3	—	10–9	2–4	4–3	3–3	5–2	3–3	12–7	12–7	2–4	3–4	10–10
Los Angeles	8–11	4–3	4–2	6–0	9–10	—	6–1	3–3	7–0	4–3	6–1	13–6	11–8	4–3	3–3	16–4
Miami	4–3	8–11	3–4	5–2	4–2	1–6	—	2–4	12–7	8–11	3–4	5–1	5–1	2–5	6–13	9–11
Milwaukee	3–4	2–4	9–10	11–8	3–4	3–3	4–2	—	5–2	3–3	9–10	5–2	3–4	11–8	4–3	11–9
New York	1–6	12–7	2–4	4–3	3–3	0–7	7–12	2–5	—	12–7	3–3	3–4	5–1	3–4	6–13	7–13
Philadelphia	1–6	13–6	3–4	2–4	2–5	3–4	11–8	3–3	7–12	—	2–5	1–5	4–3	1–5	8–11	5–15
Pittsburgh	3–4	5–2	9–10	6–13	3–3	1–6	4–3	10–9	3–3	5–2	—	3–3	1–5	8–11	4–3	10–10
San Diego	8–11	2–5	4–2	4–3	7–12	6–13	1–5	2–5	4–3	5–1	3–3	—	12–7	3–4	2–5	8–12
San Francisco	7–12	3–4	3–4	3–4	7–12	8–11	1–5	4–3	1–5	3–4	5–1	7–12	—	3–4	1–5	8–12
St. Louis	4–3	5–1	5–14	10–9	4–2	3–4	5–2	8–11	4–3	5–1	11–8	4–3	4–3	—	3–3	8–12
Washington	4–2	10–9	4–3	6–1	4–3	3–3	13–6	3–4	13–6	11–8	3–4	5–2	5–1	3–3	—	10–10

=== Game log ===
Legend
	Phillies win
	Phillies loss
	Postponement
**Bold**	Phillies team member

2017 Game Log Overall Record: 66–96 (Home: 39–42; Away: 27–54)
April: 11–12 (Home: 7–4; Away: 4–8)

#	Date	Opponent	Score	Win	Loss	Save	Attendance	Record	Streak
1	April 3	@ Reds	4–3	**Jeremy Hellickson** (1–0)	Scott Feldman (0–1)	**Jeanmar Gómez** (1)	43,804	1–0	W1
2	April 5	@ Reds	0–2	Brandon Finnegan (1–0)	**Jerad Eickhoff** (0–1)	Raisel Iglesias (1)	19,944	1–1	L1
3	April 6	@ Reds	4–7	Cody Reed (1–0)	**Adam Morgan** (0–1)	Drew Storen (1)	10,586	1–2	L2
4	April 7	Nationals	6–7	Max Scherzer (1–0)	**Vince Velasquez** (0–1)	Blake Treinen (3)	45,121	1–3	L3
5	April 8	Nationals	17–3	**Aaron Nola** (1–0)	Jeremy Guthrie (0–1)	—	37,241	2–3	W1
6	April 9	Nationals	4–3	**Jeanmar Gómez** (1–0)	Koda Glover (0–1)	—	36,917	3–3	W2
7	April 10	Mets	3–4	Jerry Blevins (1–0)	**Edubray Ramos** (0–1)	Addison Reed (2)	33,359	3–4	L1
8	April 11	Mets	4–14	Matt Harvey (2–0)	**Clay Buchholz** (0–1)	—	28,659	3–5	L2
9	April 12	Mets	4–5	Zack Wheeler (1–1)	**Vince Velasquez** (0–2)	Addison Reed (3)	28,272	3–6	L3
10	April 14	@ Nationals	2–3 (10)	Shawn Kelley (1–0)	**Jeanmar Gómez** (1–1)	—	38,664	3–7	L4
11	April 15	@ Nationals	4–2	**Jeremy Hellickson** (2–0)	Joe Blanton (0–2)	**Joaquín Benoit** (1)	35,626	4–7	W1
12	April 16	@ Nationals	4–6	Shawn Kelley (2–0)	**Joaquín Benoit** (0–1)	—	29,774	4–8	L1
13	April 18	@ Mets	6–2 (10)	**Luis García** (1–0)	Rafael Montero (0–2)	—	23,536	5–8	W1
14	April 19	@ Mets	4–5	Hansel Robles (3–0)	**Edubray Ramos** (0–2)	Addison Reed (4)	22,243	5–9	L1
15	April 20	@ Mets	6–4	**Aaron Nola** (2–0)	Noah Syndergaard (1–1)	**Héctor Neris** (1)	24,656	6–9	W1
16	April 21	Braves	4–3	**Jeremy Hellickson** (3–0)	Bartolo Colón (1–2)	**Héctor Neris** (2)	24,189	7–9	W2
17	April 22	Braves	4–3 (10)	**Jeanmar Gómez** (2–1)	Jim Johnson (2–1)	—	31,334	8–9	W3
18	April 23	Braves	5–2	**Joely Rodríguez** (1–0)	Arodys Vizcaíno (1–1)	—	28,632	9–9	W4
–	April 25	Marlins	Postponed (rain); Makeup: August 22 as a straight doubleheader						
19	April 26	Marlins	7–4	**Vince Velasquez** (1–2)	Wei-Yin Chen (2–1)	—	26,191	10–9	W5
20	April 27	Marlins	3–2	**Jeremy Hellickson** (4–0)	Edinson Vólquez (0–3)	**Héctor Neris** (3)	22,180	11–9	W6
21	April 28	@ Dodgers	3–5	Kenta Maeda (2–2)	**Jerad Eickhoff** (0–2)	Kenley Jansen (6)	46,729	11–10	L1
22	April 29	@ Dodgers	5–6	Grant Dayton (1–0)	**Héctor Neris** (0–1)	—	53,110	11–11	L2
23	April 30	@ Dodgers	3–5	Hyun-jin Ryu (1–4)	**Nick Pivetta** (0–1)	Kenley Jansen (7)	48,961	11–12	L3

May: 6–22 (Home: 3–9; Away: 3–13)

#	Date	Opponent	Score	Win	Loss	Save	Attendance	Record	Streak
24	May 1	@ Cubs	10–2	**Vince Velasquez** (2–2)	Brett Anderson (2–1)	—	38,567	12–12	W1
25	May 2	@ Cubs	3–8	Jon Lester (1–1)	**Jeremy Hellickson** (4–1)	—	38,660	12–13	L1
26	May 3	@ Cubs	4–5	Jake Arrieta (4–1)	**Jerad Eickhoff** (0–3)	Wade Davis (7)	39,335	12–14	L2
27	May 4	@ Cubs	4–5 (13)	Koji Uehara (1–2)	**Joely Rodríguez** (1–1)	—	36,394	12–15	L3
28	May 5	Nationals	2–4	Stephen Strasburg (3–1)	**Nick Pivetta** (0–2)	Matt Albers (1)	20,237	12–16	L4
29	May 6	Nationals	2–6	A. J. Cole (1–0)	**Vince Velasquez** (2–3)	—	21,298	12–17	L5
30	May 7	Nationals	6–5 (10)	**Héctor Neris** (1–1)	Blake Treinen (0–1)	—	30,464	13–17	W1
31	May 9	Mariners	9–10	Nick Vincent (1–0)	**Héctor Neris** (1–2)	Edwin Díaz (7)	31,715	13–18	L1
32	May 10	Mariners	6–11	Tony Zych (2–0)	**Joaquín Benoit** (0–2)	—	26,697	13–19	L2
–	May 12	@ Nationals	Postponed (rain); Makeup: May 14 as a split doubleheader						
33	May 13	@ Nationals	4–6	Shawn Kelley (3–0)	**Edubray Ramos** (0–3)	—	31,473	13–20	L3
34	May 14 (1)	@ Nationals	4–3	**Joaquín Benoit** (1–2)	Shawn Kelley (3–1)	**Héctor Neris** (4)	31,738	14–20	W1
35	May 14 (2)	@ Nationals	5–6	Jacob Turner (2–1)	**Pat Neshek** (0–1)	Matt Albers (2)	30,137	14–21	L1
36	May 16	@ Rangers	1–5	Yu Darvish (4–2)	**Jerad Eickhoff** (0–4)	—	23,110	14–22	L2
37	May 17	@ Rangers	3–9	Andrew Cashner (1–3)	**Zach Eflin** (0–1)	—	28,703	14–23	L3
38	May 18	@ Rangers	4–8	Martín Pérez (2–5)	**Joely Rodríguez** (1–2)	—	35,007	14–24	L4
39	May 19	@ Pirates	7–2	**Jeremy Hellickson** (5–1)	Trevor Williams (2–3)	—	25,795	15–24	W1
40	May 20	@ Pirates	3–6	Iván Nova (4–3)	**Vince Velasquez** (2–4)	Tony Watson (9)	32,572	15–25	L1
41	May 21	@ Pirates	0–1	Wade LeBlanc (3–0)	**Aaron Nola** (2–1)	Tony Watson (10)	24,445	15–26	L2
42	May 22	Rockies	1–8	Jeff Hoffman (2–0)	**Jerad Eickhoff** (0–5)	—	21,251	15–27	L3
43	May 23	Rockies	2–8	Germán Márquez (3–2)	**Zach Eflin** (0–2)	—	17,109	15–28	L4
44	May 24	Rockies	2–7	Tyler Chatwood (4–6)	**Jeremy Hellickson** (5–2)	—	19,160	15–29	L5
45	May 25	Rockies	4–3 (11)	**Jeanmar Gómez** (3–1)	Scott Oberg (0–1)	—	18,143	16–29	W1
46	May 26	Reds	2–5	Tim Adleman (3–2)	**Aaron Nola** (2–2)	Raisel Iglesias (9)	21,388	16–30	L1
47	May 27	Reds	4–3	**Héctor Neris** (2–2)	Michael Lorenzen (3–1)	—	30,100	17–30	W1
48	May 28	Reds	4–8	Scott Feldman (4–4)	**Zach Eflin** (0–3)	—	25,413	17–31	L1
49	May 29	@ Marlins	1–4	Edinson Vólquez (1–7)	**Jeremy Hellickson** (5–3)	A. J. Ramos (6)	17,032	17–32	L2
50	May 30	@ Marlins	2–7	Dustin McGowan (2–0)	**Vince Velasquez** (2–5)	—	16,241	17–33	L3
51	May 31	@ Marlins	2–10	Dan Straily (4–3)	**Aaron Nola** (2–3)	—	15,197	17–34	L4

June: 9–18 (Home: 4–7; Away: 5–11)

#	Date	Opponent	Score	Win	Loss	Save	Attendance	Record	Streak
52	June 2	Giants	0–10	Ty Blach (4–2)	**Jerad Eickhoff** (0–6)	—	22,491	17–35	L5
53	June 3	Giants	5–3	**Ben Lively** (1–0)	Johnny Cueto (5–5)	**Jeanmar Gómez** (2)	32,413	18–35	W1
54	June 4	Giants	9–7	**Pat Neshek** (1–1)	Derek Law (3–1)	**Héctor Neris** (5)	25,063	19–35	W2
55	June 5	@ Braves	11–4	**Nick Pivetta** (1–2)	Bartolo Colón (2–7)	—	20,942	20–35	W3
56	June 6	@ Braves	3–1	**Aaron Nola** (3–3)	Jaime García (2–4)	**Pat Neshek** (1)	23,489	21–35	W4
57	June 7	@ Braves	1–14	Mike Foltynewicz (4–5)	**Jerad Eickhoff** (0–7)	—	24,185	21–36	L1
58	June 8	@ Braves	1–3	R. A. Dickey (4–4)	**Ben Lively** (1–1)	Jim Johnson (12)	25,095	21–37	L2
59	June 9	@ Cardinals	2–3	Michael Wacha (3–3)	**Jeremy Hellickson** (5–4)	Seung-hwan Oh (14)	42,971	21–38	L3
60	June 10	@ Cardinals	0–7	Carlos Martínez (5–5)	**Nick Pivetta** (1–3)	—	43,911	21–39	L4
61	June 11	@ Cardinals	5–6	Adam Wainwright (7–4)	**Aaron Nola** (3–4)	Seung-hwan Oh (15)	47,325	21–40	L5
62	June 12	@ Red Sox	5–6 (11)	Matt Barnes (5–2)	**Casey Fien** (0–1)	—	36,757	21–41	L6
63	June 13	@ Red Sox	3–4 (12)	Fernando Abad (2–0)	**Luis García** (1–1)	—	37,141	21–42	L7
64	June 14	Red Sox	3–7	Héctor Velázquez (1–1)	**Jeremy Hellickson** (5–5)	—	28,263	21–43	L8
65	June 15	Red Sox	1–0	**Pat Neshek** (2–1)	Chris Sale (8–3)	**Héctor Neris** (6)	30,729	22–43	W1
66	June 16	Diamondbacks	4–5	Patrick Corbin (6–6)	**Aaron Nola** (3–5)	Fernando Rodney (19)	18,140	22–44	L1
67	June 17	Diamondbacks	1–5	Jorge de la Rosa (3–1)	**Edubray Ramos** (0–4)	—	21,108	22–45	L2
68	June 18	Diamondbacks	4–5 (12)	Archie Bradley (3–1)	**Jeanmar Gómez** (3–2)	Fernando Rodney (20)	31,131	22–46	L3
69	June 20	Cardinals	1–8 (11)	Kevin Siegrist (1–1)	**Edubray Ramos** (0–5)	—	22,070	22–47	L4
70	June 21	Cardinals	6–7 (10)	Brett Cecil (1–2)	**Edubray Ramos** (0–6)	Seung-hwan Oh (16)	25,037	22–48	L5
71	June 22	Cardinals	5–1	**Aaron Nola** (4–5)	Carlos Martínez (6–6)	—	23,623	23–48	W1
72	June 23	@ Diamondbacks	6–1	**Mark Leiter** (1–0)	Patrick Corbin (6–7)	—	31,648	24–48	W2
73	June 24	@ Diamondbacks	2–9	Robbie Ray (8–3)	**Ben Lively** (1–2)	—	40,557	24–49	L1
74	June 25	@ Diamondbacks	1–2 (11)	T. J. McFarland (4–1)	**Edubray Ramos** (0–7)	—	28,179	24–50	L2
75	June 26	@ Diamondbacks	1–6	Zack Greinke (9–4)	**Nick Pivetta** (1–4)	—	20,765	24–51	L3
76	June 27	@ Mariners	8–2	**Aaron Nola** (5–5)	James Paxton (5–3)	—	22,648	25–51	W1
77	June 28	@ Mariners	5–4	**Ricardo Pinto** (1–0)	Edwin Díaz (2–3)	**Héctor Neris** (7)	29,505	26–51	W2
78	June 30	@ Mets	1–2	Jacob deGrom (8–3)	**Ben Lively** (1–3)	Addison Reed (13)	37,134	26–52	L1

July: 13–12 (Home: 9–8; Away: 4–4)

#	Date	Opponent	Score	Win	Loss	Save	Attendance	Record	Streak
79	July 1	@ Mets	6–7	Fernando Salas (1–2)	**Pat Neshek** (2–2)	Addison Reed (14)	33,080	26–53	L2
80	July 2	@ Mets	7–1	**Nick Pivetta** (2–4)	Rafael Montero (1–5)	—	30,343	27–53	W1
81	July 3	Pirates	4–0	**Aaron Nola** (6–5)	Iván Nova (8–6)	—	26,498	28–53	W2
82	July 4	Pirates	0–3	Jameson Taillon (5–1)	**Mark Leiter** (1–1)	Felipe Rivero (4)	24,087	28–54	L1
83	July 5	Pirates	2–5	Gerrit Cole (7–7)	**Ben Lively** (1–4)	Felipe Rivero (5)	19,099	28–55	L2
84	July 6	Pirates	3–6	Chad Kuhl (3–6)	**Joaquín Benoit** (1–3)	Juan Nicasio (1)	33,059	28–56	L3
85	July 7	Padres	3–4	Brad Hand (2–4)	**Héctor Neris** (2–3)	Brandon Maurer (18)	38,533	28–57	L4
86	July 8	Padres	1–2	Jhoulys Chacín (8–7)	**Aaron Nola** (6–6)	Brandon Maurer (19)	33,216	28–58	L5
87	July 9	Padres	7–1	**Jerad Eickhoff** (1–7)	Trevor Cahill (3–3)	—	21,184	29–58	W1
–	July 11	**2017 Major League Baseball All-Star Game at Marlins Park in Miami**							
88	July 14	@ Brewers	6–9	Zach Davies (11–4)	**Nick Pivetta** (2–5)	Corey Knebel (15)	41,941	29–59	L1
89	July 15	@ Brewers	2–3	Jacob Barnes (2–1)	**Joaquín Benoit** (1–4)	Corey Knebel (16)	37,950	29–60	L2
90	July 16	@ Brewers	5–2	**Jeremy Hellickson** (6–5)	Rob Scahill (1–3)	**Héctor Neris** (8)	41,747	30–60	W1
91	July 17	@ Marlins	5–6 (10)	Drew Steckenrider (1–1)	**Mark Leiter** (1–2)	—	17,146	30–61	L1
92	July 18	@ Marlins	5–2	**Pat Neshek** (3–2)	Dustin McGowan (5–1)	**Héctor Neris** (9)	18,176	31–61	W1
93	July 19	@ Marlins	10–3	**Nick Pivetta** (3–5)	Dan Straily (7–5)	—	31,854	32–61	W2
94	July 21	Brewers	6–1	**Aaron Nola** (7–6)	Matt Garza (4–5)	—	17,550	33–61	W3
95	July 22	Brewers	8–9	Jacob Barnes (3–1)	**Héctor Neris** (2–4)	Corey Knebel (17)	17,712	33–62	L1
96	July 23	Brewers	6–3	**Jerad Eickhoff** (2–7)	Junior Guerra (1–4)	**Luis García** (1)	21,258	34–62	W1
97	July 24	Astros	4–13	Joe Musgrove (5–8)	**Vince Velasquez** (2–6)	—	17,567	34–63	L1
98	July 25	Astros	0–5	Charlie Morton (8–4)	**Nick Pivetta** (3–6)	—	17,176	34–64	L2
99	July 26	Astros	9–0	**Aaron Nola** (8–6)	Mike Fiers (7–5)	—	19,718	35–64	W1
100	July 28	Braves	10–3	**Jake Thompson** (1–0)	Julio Teherán (7–9)	**Joaquín Benoit** (2)	17,177	36–64	W2
101	July 29	Braves	4–3 (11)	**Héctor Neris** (3–4)	Rex Brothers (1–1)	—	28,162	37–64	W3
102	July 30	Braves	2–1	**Héctor Neris** (4–4)	Rex Brothers (1–2)	—	20,680	38–64	W4
103	July 31	Braves	7–6	**Nick Pivetta** (4–6)	Mike Foltynewicz (9–6)	**Héctor Neris** (10)	20,297	39–64	W5

August: 11–19 (Home: 5–9; Away: 6–10)

#	Date	Opponent	Score	Win	Loss	Save	Attendance	Record	Streak
104	August 1	@ Angels	1–7	Ricky Nolasco (5–12)	**Aaron Nola** (8–7)	—	36,344	39–65	L1
105	August 2	@ Angels	0–7	J. C. Ramírez (10–9)	**Jake Thompson** (1–1)	—	34,623	39–66	L2
106	August 3	@ Angels	4–5	Yusmeiro Petit (3–0)	**Luis García** (1–2)	Bud Norris (17)	34,710	39–67	L3
107	August 4	@ Rockies	3–4	Mike Dunn (4–1)	**Luis García** (1–3)	Greg Holland (34)	35,092	39–68	L4
108	August 5	@ Rockies	5–8	Jon Gray (4–2)	**Nick Pivetta** (4–7)	—	40,563	39–69	L5
109	August 6	@ Rockies	3–2	**Edubray Ramos** (1–7)	Greg Holland (2–2)	**Héctor Neris** (11)	48,069	40–69	W1
110	August 8	@ Braves	5–2	**Zach Eflin** (1–3)	Julio Teherán (7–10)	**Héctor Neris** (12)	25,783	41–69	W2
111	August 9	@ Braves	3–2	**Jerad Eickhoff** (3–7)	Sean Newcomb (1–7)	**Héctor Neris** (13)	22,776	42–69	W3
112	August 10	Mets	0–10	Jacob deGrom (13–5)	**Vince Velasquez** (2–7)	—	27,716	42–70	L1
113	August 11	Mets	6–7	Hansel Robles (7–3)	**Héctor Neris** (4–5)	A. J. Ramos (22)	26,925	42–71	L2
114	August 12	Mets	3–1	**Aaron Nola** (9–7)	Steven Matz (2–6)	**Luis García** (2)	34,131	43–71	W1
115	August 13	Mets	2–6	Chris Flexen (2–1)	**Zach Eflin** (1–4)	—	24,106	43–72	L1
116	August 14	@ Padres	4–7	José Torres (7–3)	**Ricardo Pinto** (1–1)	Brad Hand (10)	20,873	43–73	L2
117	August 15	@ Padres	4–8	Dinelson Lamet (7–4)	**Mark Leiter** (1–3)	—	23,368	43–74	L3
118	August 16	@ Padres	0–3	Clayton Richard (6–12)	**Nick Pivetta** (4–8)	—	21,564	43–75	L4
119	August 17	@ Giants	4–5	Jeff Samardzija (8–12)	**Aaron Nola** (9–8)	Sam Dyson (20)	41,279	43–76	L5
120	August 18	@ Giants	2–10	Matt Moore (4–12)	**Zach Eflin** (1–5)	—	39,487	43–77	L6
121	August 19	@ Giants	12–9	**Adam Morgan** (1–1)	Ty Blach (8–9)	**Héctor Neris** (14)	40,719	44–77	W1
122	August 20	@ Giants	5–2	**Adam Morgan** (2–1)	Hunter Strickland (2–3)	**Héctor Neris** (15)	39,921	45–77	W2
123	August 22 (1)	Marlins	8–12	Dan Straily (8–8)	**Aaron Nola** (9–9)	—	see 2nd game	45–78	L1
124	August 22 (2)	Marlins	4–7	José Ureña (12–5)	**Nick Pivetta** (4–9)	Brad Ziegler (7)	20,761	45–79	
125	August 23	Marlins	8–0	**Mark Leiter** (2–3)	Justin Nicolino (2–2)	—	19,161	46–79	W1
126	August 24	Marlins	8–9	Jarlin García (1–2)	**Luis García** (1–4)	Brad Ziegler (8)	18,083	46–80	L1
127	August 25	Cubs	7–1	**Jerad Eickhoff** (4–7)	José Quintana (8–11)	—	24,424	47–80	W1
128	August 26	Cubs	2–17	Kyle Hendricks (5–4)	**Ben Lively** (1–5)	—	29,379	47–81	L1
129	August 27	Cubs	6–3	**Nick Pivetta** (5–9)	John Lackey (10–10)	**Héctor Neris** (16)	28,689	48–81	W1
130	August 28	Braves	6–1	**Aaron Nola** (10–9)	Lucas Sims (2–4)	—	15,154	49–81	W2
–	August 29	Braves	Postponed (rain); Makeup: August 30 as a straight doubleheader						
131	August 30 (1)	Braves	1–9	R. A. Dickey (9–8)	**Jerad Eickhoff** (4–8)	—	see 2nd game	49–82	L1
132	August 30 (2)	Braves	2–5	Julio Teherán (9–11)	**Mark Leiter** (2–4)	Arodys Vizcaíno (9)	15,706	49–83	L3
133	August 31	@ Marlins	3–2	**Ben Lively** (2–5)	Odrisamer Despaigne (0–2)	**Héctor Neris** (17)	17,013	50–83	W1

September/October: 16–13 (Home: 11–5; Away: 5–8)

#	Date	Opponent	Score	Win	Loss	Save	Attendance	Record	Streak
134	September 1	@ Marlins	2–1	**Juan Nicasio** (3–5)	Brad Ziegler (1–3)	**Héctor Neris** (18)	17,998	51–83	W1
135	September 2	@ Marlins	9–10	Dan Straily (9–8)	**Aaron Nola** (10–10)	Drew Steckenrider (1)	18,262	51–84	L1
136	September 3	@ Marlins	3–1 (12)	**Adam Morgan** (3–1)	Junichi Tazawa (3–4)	**Héctor Neris** (19)	19,404	52–84	W1
137	September 4	@ Mets	7–11	Rafael Montero (4–9)	**Mark Leiter** (2–5)	—	28,808	52–85	L1
138	September 5	@ Mets	9–1	**Ben Lively** (3–5)	Jacob deGrom (14–9)	—	22,230	53–85	W1
139	September 6	@ Mets	3–6 (6)	Robert Gsellman (6–6)	**Nick Pivetta** (5–10)	—	19,617	53–86	L1
140	September 7	@ Nationals	3–4	Tanner Roark (12–9)	**Adam Morgan** (3–2)	Sean Doolittle (19)	26,267	53–87	L2
141	September 8	@ Nationals	10–11	Max Scherzer (14–5)	**Jake Thompson** (1–2)	Sean Doolittle (20)	29,837	53–88	L3
142	September 9	@ Nationals	5–4	**Mark Leiter** (3–5)	Edwin Jackson (5–5)	**Héctor Neris** (20)	35,694	54–88	W1
143	September 10	@ Nationals	2–3	Stephen Strasburg (13–4)	**Ben Lively** (3–6)	Ryan Madson (2)	32,627	54–89	L1
144	September 12	Marlins	9–8 (15)	**Edubray Ramos** (2–7)	Javy Guerra (1–1)	—	16,439	55–89	W1
145	September 13	Marlins	8–1	**Aaron Nola** (11–10)	Dan Straily (9–9)	—	16,745	56–89	W2
146	September 14	Marlins	10–0	**Jake Thompson** (2–2)	Vance Worley (2–6)	—	16,302	57–89	W3
147	September 15	Athletics	0–4	Daniel Mengden (1–1)	**Mark Leiter** (3–6)	—	24,061	57–90	L1
148	September 16	Athletics	5–3	**Víctor Arano** (1–0)	Simón Castro (1–3)	**Héctor Neris** (21)	24,290	58–90	W1
149	September 17	Athletics	3–6	Sean Manaea (11–10)	**Henderson Álvarez** (0–1)	Blake Treinen (11)	28,054	58–91	L1
150	September 18	Dodgers	4–3	**Nick Pivetta** (6–10)	Clayton Kershaw (17–4)	**Héctor Neris** (22)	16,690	59–91	W1
151	September 19	Dodgers	6–2	**Aaron Nola** (12–10)	Pedro Báez (3–6)	—	20,145	60–91	W2
152	September 20	Dodgers	7–5	**Luis García** (2–4)	Luis Avilán (2–3)	**Héctor Neris** (23)	20,175	61–91	W3
153	September 21	Dodgers	4–5	Walker Buehler (1–0)	**Ricardo Pinto** (1–2)	Kenley Jansen (39)	18,735	61–92	L1
154	September 22	@ Braves	2–7	Sean Newcomb (4–8)	**Ben Lively** (3–7)	—	33,702	61–93	L2
155	September 23	@ Braves	2–4	Rex Brothers (4–3)	**Luis García** (2–5)	Arodys Vizcaíno (13)	39,809	61–94	L3
156	September 24	@ Braves	2–0	**Nick Pivetta** (7–10)	Luiz Gohara (1–3)	**Héctor Neris** (24)	33,183	62–94	W1
157	September 25	Nationals	1–3	A. J. Cole (3–5)	**Aaron Nola** (12–11)	Sean Doolittle (24)	17,026	62–95	L1
158	September 26	Nationals	4–1	**Jake Thompson** (3–2)	Gio González (15–8)	**Héctor Neris** (25)	16,437	63–95	W1
159	September 27	Nationals	7–5	**Yacksel Ríos** (1–0)	Tanner Roark (13–11)	**Héctor Neris** (26)	17,642	64–95	W2
160	September 29	Mets	6–2	**Ben Lively** (4–7)	Matt Harvey (5–7)	—	19,375	65–95	W3
161	September 30	Mets	4–7 (11)	Jacob Rhame (1–1)	**Adam Morgan** (3–3)	Jeurys Familia (6)	25,138	65–96	L1
162	October 1	Mets	11–0	**Nick Pivetta** (8–10)	Chris Flexen (3–6)	—	25,754	66–96	W1

== Roster ==
All players who made an appearance for the Phillies during 2017 are included.

2017 Philadelphia Phillies
Roster
Pitchers: 58 Henderson Álvarez; 63 Drew Anderson; 64 Víctor Arano; 47 Pedro Beato; 53 Joaquín Benoit; 21 Clay Buchholz; 52 Zac Curtis; 56 Zach Eflin; 48 Jerad Eickhoff; 54 Casey Fien; 57 Luis García; 46 Jeanmar Gómez; 58 Jeremy Hellickson; 59 Mark Leiter; 49 Ben Lively; 55 Hoby Milner; 39 Adam Morgan; 50 Héctor Neris; 17 Pat Neshek; 58 Juan Nicasio; 27 Aaron Nola; 51 Ricardo Pinto; 43 Nick Pivetta; 61 Edubray Ramos; 53 Yacksel Ríos; 63 Joely Rodríguez; 54 Kevin Siegrist; 46 Jesen Therrien; 44 Jake Thompson; 28 Vince Velasquez	Catchers: 38 Jorge Alfaro; 34 Andrew Knapp; 29 Cameron Rupp; Infielders: 4 Andrés Blanco; 2 J. P. Crawford; 7 Maikel Franco; 13 Freddy Galvis; 16 César Hernández; 19 Tommy Joseph; 15 Ty Kelly; 41 Brock Stassi	Outfielders: 23 Aaron Altherr; 18 Pedro Florimón; 37 Odubel Herrera; 17 Rhys Hoskins; 47 Howie Kendrick; 31 Hyun-soo Kim; 25 Daniel Nava; 30 Cameron Perkins; 5 Michael Saunders; 5 Nick Williams	Manager: 45 Pete Mackanin; Coaches: 10 Larry Bowa (bench); 33 Rick Kranitz (assistant pitching); 22 Bob McClure (pitching); -- Doug Mansolino (Field Coordinator); 9 John McLaren (bullpen); 12 Mickey Morandini (first base); 8 Juan Samuel (third base); 40 Matt Stairs (hitting); 81 Jesús Tiamo (bullpen catcher)

== Player stats ==
=== Batting ===
Note: G = Games played; AB = At bats; R = Runs; H = Hits; 2B = Doubles; 3B = Triples; HR = Home runs; RBI = Runs batted in; SB = Stolen bases; BB = Walks; AVG = Batting average; SLG = Slugging average

Player	G	AB	R	H	2B	3B	HR	RBI	SB	BB	AVG	SLG
Freddy Galvis	162	608	71	155	29	6	12	61	14	45	.255	.382
Maikel Franco	154	575	66	132	29	1	24	76	0	41	.230	.409
Odúbel Herrera	138	526	67	148	42	3	14	56	8	31	.281	.452
César Hernández	128	511	85	150	26	6	9	34	15	61	.294	.421
Tommy Joseph	142	495	51	119	27	1	22	69	1	33	.240	.432
Aaron Altherr	107	372	58	101	24	5	19	65	5	32	.272	.516
Nick Williams	83	313	45	90	14	4	12	55	1	20	.288	.473
Cameron Rupp	88	295	35	64	17	0	14	34	1	34	.217	.417
Michael Saunders	61	200	25	41	9	2	6	20	0	13	.205	.360
Daniel Nava	80	183	21	55	8	1	4	21	1	26	.301	.421
Andrew Knapp	56	171	26	44	8	1	3	13	1	31	.257	.368
Rhys Hoskins	50	170	37	44	7	0	18	48	2	37	.259	.618
Howie Kendrick	39	141	16	48	8	1	2	16	8	11	.340	.454
Andrés Blanco	80	130	10	25	4	0	3	13	1	12	.192	.292
Jorge Alfaro	29	107	12	34	6	0	5	14	0	3	.318	.514
Ty Kelly	69	88	11	17	7	0	2	14	0	8	.193	.341
Cameron Perkins	42	88	9	16	5	0	1	8	0	5	.182	.273
Hyun-soo Kim	40	87	9	20	4	1	0	4	0	10	.230	.299
Brock Stassi	51	78	6	13	2	1	2	7	0	12	.167	.295
J. P. Crawford	23	70	8	15	4	1	0	6	1	16	.214	.300
Pedro Florimón	15	46	6	16	4	1	0	6	0	3	.348	.478
Pitcher totals	162	281	16	35	3	1	2	14	0	10	.125	.164
Team totals	162	5535	690	1352	287	36	174	654	59	494	.250	.409

=== Pitching ===
Note: W = Wins; L = Losses; ERA = Earned run average; G = Games pitched; GS = Games started; SV = Saves; IP = Innings pitched; H = Hits allowed; R = Runs allowed; ER = Earned runs allowed; BB = Walks allowed; SO = Strikeouts

Player	W	L	ERA	G	GS	SV	IP	H	R	ER	BB	SO
Aaron Nola	12	11	3.54	27	27	0	168.0	154	67	66	49	184
Nick Pivetta	8	10	6.02	26	26	0	133.0	144	91	89	57	140
Jerad Eickhoff	4	8	4.71	24	24	0	128.0	142	74	67	53	118
Jeremy Hellickson	6	5	4.73	20	20	0	112.1	111	62	59	30	65
Mark Leiter Jr.	3	6	4.96	27	11	0	90.2	90	59	50	31	84
Ben Lively	4	7	4.26	15	15	0	88.2	90	45	42	24	52
Héctor Neris	4	5	3.01	74	0	26	74.2	68	26	25	26	86
Vince Velasquez	2	7	5.13	15	15	0	72.0	74	44	41	34	68
Luis García	2	5	2.65	66	0	2	71.1	61	22	21	26	60
Zach Eflin	1	5	6.16	11	11	0	64.1	79	45	44	12	35
Edubray Ramos	2	7	4.21	59	0	0	57.2	57	29	27	28	75
Adam Morgan	3	3	4.12	37	0	0	54.2	51	25	25	18	63
Jake Thompson	3	2	3.88	11	8	0	46.1	50	27	20	22	35
Joaquín Benoit	1	4	4.07	44	0	2	42.0	32	19	19	16	43
Pat Neshek	3	2	1.12	43	0	1	40.1	28	5	5	5	45
Hoby Milner	0	0	2.01	37	0	0	31.1	30	7	7	16	22
Ricardo Pinto	1	2	7.89	25	0	0	29.2	39	28	26	17	25
Joely Rodríguez	1	2	6.33	26	0	0	27.0	37	26	19	15	18
Jeanmar Gómez	3	2	7.25	18	0	2	22.1	31	19	18	7	21
Jesen Therrien	0	0	8.35	15	0	0	18.1	24	17	17	7	10
Yacksel Ríos	1	0	4.41	13	0	0	16.1	15	8	8	9	17
Henderson Álvarez	0	1	4.30	3	3	0	14.2	14	7	7	11	6
Victor Arano	1	0	1.69	10	0	0	10.2	6	2	2	4	13
Clay Buchholz	0	1	12.27	2	2	0	7.1	16	10	10	3	5
Casey Fien	0	1	10.50	4	0	0	6.0	14	7	7	2	4
Kevin Siegrist	0	0	3.60	7	0	0	5.0	4	2	2	2	7
Zac Curtis	0	0	2.45	3	0	0	3.2	3	1	1	2	4
Drew Anderson	0	0	23.14	2	0	0	2.1	6	7	6	1	2
Juan Nicasio	1	0	0.00	2	0	0	1.1	0	0	0	0	1
Pedro Beato	0	0	0.00	1	0	0	0.2	0	0	0	0	1
Andres Blanco	0	0	27.00	1	0	0	0.1	1	1	1	0	0
Team totals	66	96	4.55	162	162	33	1441.0	1471	782	729	527	1309

== Farm system ==
Level	Team	League	Manager
AAA	Lehigh Valley IronPigs	International League	Dusty Wathan
AA	Reading Fightin Phils	Eastern League	Greg Legg
A-Advanced	Clearwater Threshers	Florida State League	Shawn Williams
A	Lakewood BlueClaws	South Atlantic League	Marty Malloy
A-Short Season	Williamsport Crosscutters	New York–Penn League	Pat Borders
Rookie	GCL Phillies	Gulf Coast League	Roly de Armas
Rookie	DSL Phillies	Dominican Summer League	
