= Odúbel Herrera =

Venezuelan baseball player (born 1991)

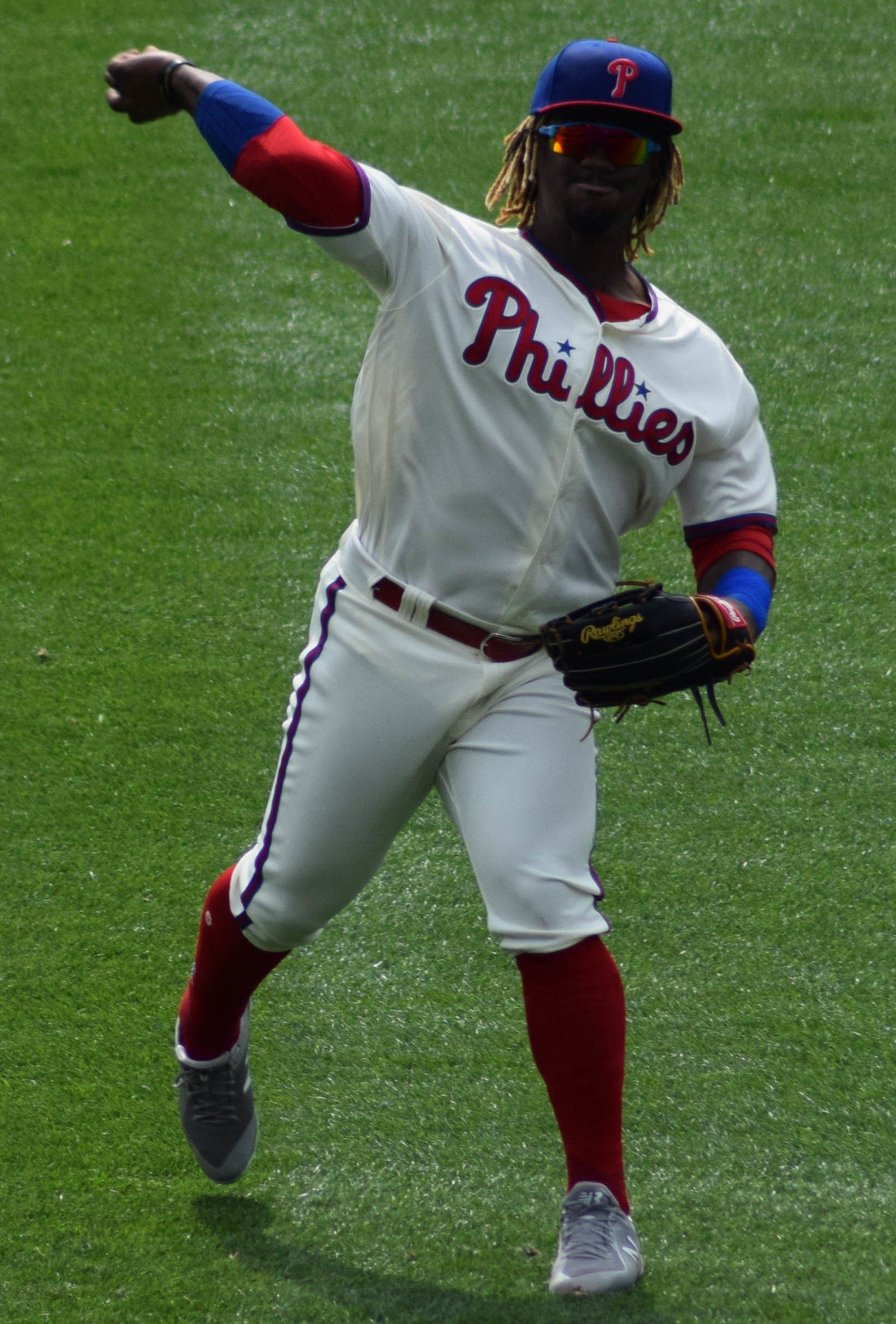
- Herrera with the Phillies in 2019

Centauros de La Guaira – No. 27
- Center fielder
- Born: December 29, 1991 (age 34); Zulia, Venezuela
- Bats: Left Throws: Right

MLB debut
- April 6, 2015, for the Philadelphia Phillies

MLB statistics (through 2022 season)
- Batting average: .272
- Home runs: 78
- Runs batted in: 302
- Stats at Baseball Reference

Teams
- Philadelphia Phillies (2015–2019, 2021–2022)

Career highlights and awards
- All-Star (2016)

Odúbel David Herrera Jr. (/oʊˈduːbʌl ɛərˈɛərə/ oh-DOO-bull air-RAIR-uh; born December 29, 1991) is a Venezuelan professional baseball center fielder for the Centauros de La Guaira of the Venezuelan Major League. He has previously played in Major League Baseball (MLB) for the Philadelphia Phillies.

Herrera grew up in Zulia, Venezuela, receiving the nickname "El Torito" (the little bull) from his father as a young baseball player. The Texas Rangers of MLB signed him as an international free agent in 2008, and he began playing the following year in the Dominican Summer League. Herrera spent the next several seasons rising through the Rangers' farm system, including back-to-back Texas League Midseason All-Star honors in 2013 and 2014. The Phillies selected Herrera in December 2014 during the Rule 5 draft. At that point, he had played most of his career at second base, but the Phillies were interested in his potential as an outfielder, and he made the opening day roster in 2015.

Herrera's first three seasons with the Phillies were marked by a strong offensive performance, including an All-Star selection in 2016, but he frequently clashed with manager Pete Mackanin in disagreements over base running. Mackanin repeatedly benched Herrera mid-game in the 2016 and 2017 seasons for a perceived lack of hustle, as well as ignoring coaches' signals on the base path. On May 27, 2019, Herrera was arrested for a domestic violence incident in Atlantic City, New Jersey. Charges were ultimately dropped, but MLB suspended him for the remainder of the season. Herrera was designated for assignment prior to the 2020 season, and the COVID-19 pandemic prevented him from playing in Minor League Baseball that year. He spent nearly two years away from American professional baseball before the Phillies re-signed him in 2021.

== Early life ==
Herrera was born in San José de Zulia, Venezuela, on December 29, 1991. His father, Odúbel Herrera Sr., is a guava and passion fruit farmer who also played second base in a local baseball league. Herrera's mother Nerida chose to name her son after his father, while Herrera's middle name, David, was in honor of Venezuelan shortstop Dave Concepción. In addition to baseball, which Herrera and his father began to take seriously when he was 12 years old, Herrera played volleyball in high school, and his affinity for spiking the ball helped to develop his athletic performance as he grew up. As Odúbel was known for being "strong and powerful" as a child, Herrera's father gave him the nickname "El Torito", Spanish for "the little bull".

== Professional career ==
=== Texas Rangers ===
The Texas Rangers of Major League Baseball (MLB) signed Herrera as an international free agent in 2008. His professional baseball career began in 2009 in the Dominican Summer League (DSL). In 58 games and 260 plate appearances with the DSL Rangers, Herrera batted .280 with 47 runs scored, 24 runs batted in (RBIs), and 58 hits. He played 51 of those games at shortstop, making 34 errors and posting a .863 fielding percentage. The following year, Herrera played for the Rookie-level Arizona League Rangers, with whom he batted .337 and recorded 31 RBIs. At the end of the season, he was named to the 2010 Arizona League Postseason All-Star Team at shortstop, one of three All-Stars from the Rangers. Herrera also played in four games for the Spokane Indians of the Low–A Northwest League. There, he registered two hits and one double in nine plate appearances.

In 2011, at the age of 19, Herrera served as the second baseman for the Single–A Hickory Crawdads of the South Atlantic League. He was a League All-Star, batting .306 with 26 doubles, three triples, three home runs, and 56 RBIs. He also had 36 stolen bases, and his 72 double plays turned were the second-highest of anyone in franchise history. The following year, Herrera was promoted to the High–A Myrtle Beach Pelicans. In the second game of a doubleheader against the Potomac Nationals on May 30, 2012, Herrera reached base safely for his 20th game in a row, tying a Carolina League record set by J. C. Holt in 2006. He batted .257 for the year, hitting two home runs and 30 RBIs, scoring 37 runs, and stealing 27 bases in 551 plate appearances.

Throughout the 2013 and 2014 seasons, Herrera played predominantly with the Pelicans and with the Double-A Frisco RoughRiders. He started the 2013 season in Frisco, batting .257 with two home runs and 100 hits in 101 games, before he was transferred back to Myrtle Beach on August 1, finishing out the season there. Herrera was assigned to the Pelicans to begin the 2014 season but was promoted back to Frisco on May 12. By the time of his promotion, he had hit .297 in 29 Carolina League games. In both seasons, he appeared as a Texas League Mid-Season All-Star, replacing Rougned Odor in 2014. At the end of the season, he captured the Texas League batting title with a .321 average, and between Myrtle Beach and Frisco, Herrera scored 73 runs and 59 RBIs during the 2014 season. He also began to dabble in the outfield, playing there for 13 games and continuing to play the position in the Venezuelan Winter League. There, Herrera hit .372, capturing the league Most Valuable Player and Rookie of the Year Awards, as well as their batting title.

=== Philadelphia Phillies ===
==== 2015–16 ====
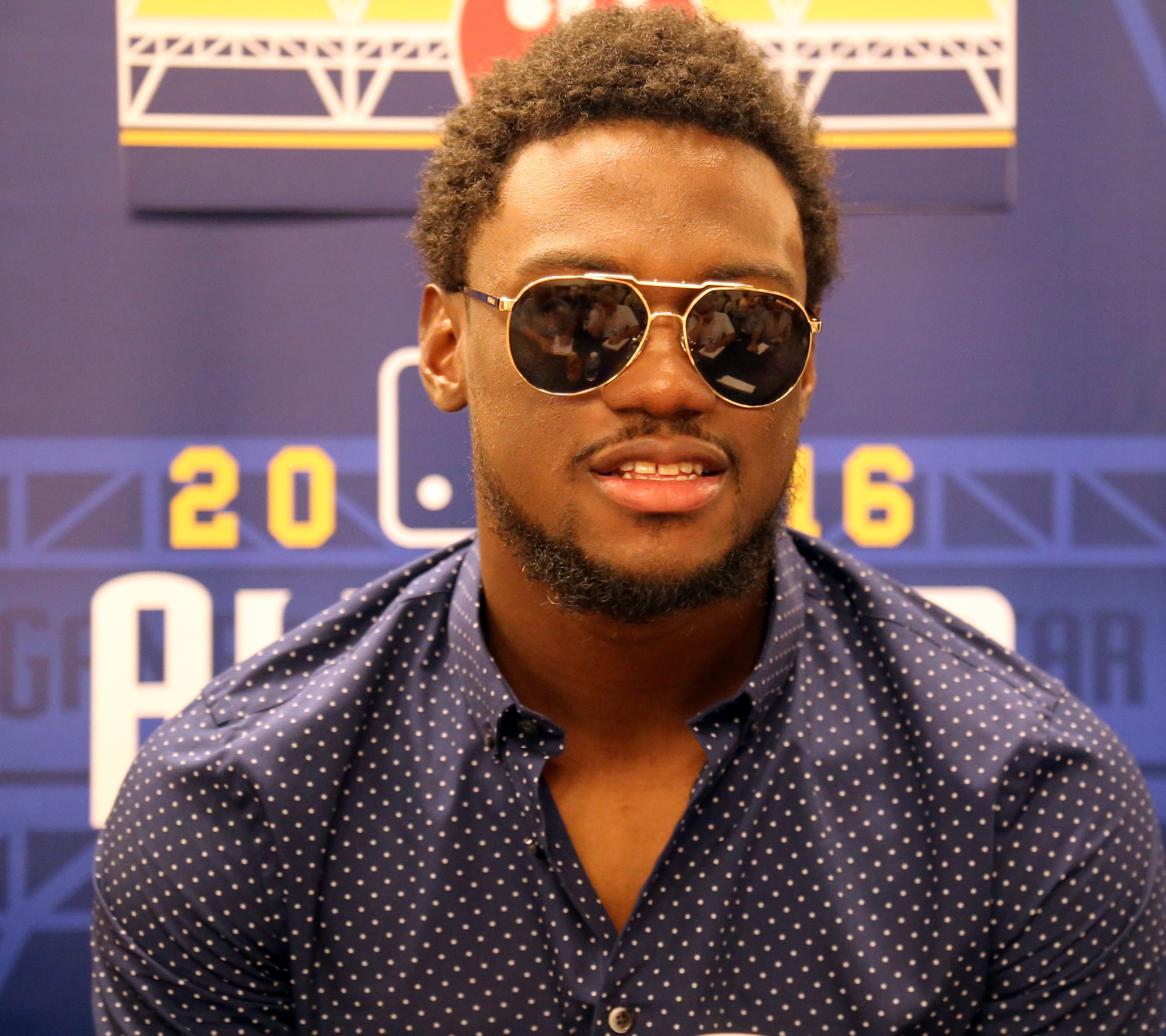
Herrera talking to reporters at 2016 All-Star Game

The Philadelphia Phillies selected Herrera from the Rangers on December 11, 2014, as part of the Rule 5 draft. Although he had served primarily as a second baseman during his minor league career, the Phillies were interested in utilizing Herrera as an outfielder. General manager Rubén Amaro, Jr. described Herrera as a player who "fits the bill of what we were trying to do", as the team looked to emphasize youth and athleticism going into the 2015 season.

During spring training, the Phillies experimented with placing Herrera in center field, pushing Ben Revere to left field in the process. Revere's defensive underperformance in spring training, as well as an injury to Domonic Brown, led Herrera to making the Phillies' opening day lineup in center field. He made his major league debut on April 6, 2015, joining Freddy Galvis as the second Phillies rookie since 1970 to make his MLB debut on opening day. His first major league hit came on April 12, with a walk-off RBI double in the 10th inning of a game against the Washington Nationals. On May 12, after striking out 14 times in his last 24 at bats, Herrera hit his first career home run off of closer Mark Melancon in the Phillies' 4–3 loss to the Pittsburgh Pirates. On July 25, Herrera made two late-inning diving catches to preserve Cole Hamels' no-hitter against the Chicago Cubs: once in the eighth inning against catcher David Ross, and again in the ninth, against third baseman Kris Bryant. Herrera also came within one game of tying Bryant's 14-game hitting streak, the longest of any National League (NL) rookie in 2015, before he went 0-for-4 in a 13–1 loss to the Arizona Diamondbacks. At the end of the year, the Phillies nominated Herrera for the Hank Aaron Award, given by fans and Hall of Fame members to the best offensive performer in each League. Herrera finished his rookie season leading the Phillies in batting (.297), runs scored (64), and doubles (30). He was also the first Phillies rookie to record 30 or more doubles in a season since Scott Rolen in 1997.

Despite his breakout rookie season, Herrera was disappointed with his offensive performance, particularly with his impatience at the plate and high strikeout rate. He spent the offseason practicing with his father, and he returned to the Phillies in 2016 with a more measured approach. As a result, Herrera swung at fewer pitches outside the strike zone and began to draw more walks, including a seven-game walk streak in April. Despite Herrera's offensive success, Phillies manager Pete Mackanin was often frustrated with Herrera's lack of defensive speed, culminating in a mid-game benching on May 23, when he failed to run for a ground ball in a game against the Detroit Tigers. After batting .294 for the first half of the season, with 10 home runs and 12 stolen bases, Herrera received his first All-Star Game selection in 2016. He entered as a pinch hitter in the sixth inning, flying out to Ian Desmond of the Rangers. He finished the season batting .286 with 15 home runs, 49 RBIs, 87 runs scored, and 25 stolen bases. In addition to his All-Star selection, Herrera was a finalist for the 2016 National League Gold Glove Award after registering 11 outfield assists and leading the team with 4.2 Wins Above Replacement (WAR). On December 15, 2016, the Phillies signed Herrera to a five-year, $30.5 million contract extension. He was the first player on the Phillies core roster to receive a contract extension beyond the 2017 season.

==== 2017–18 ====
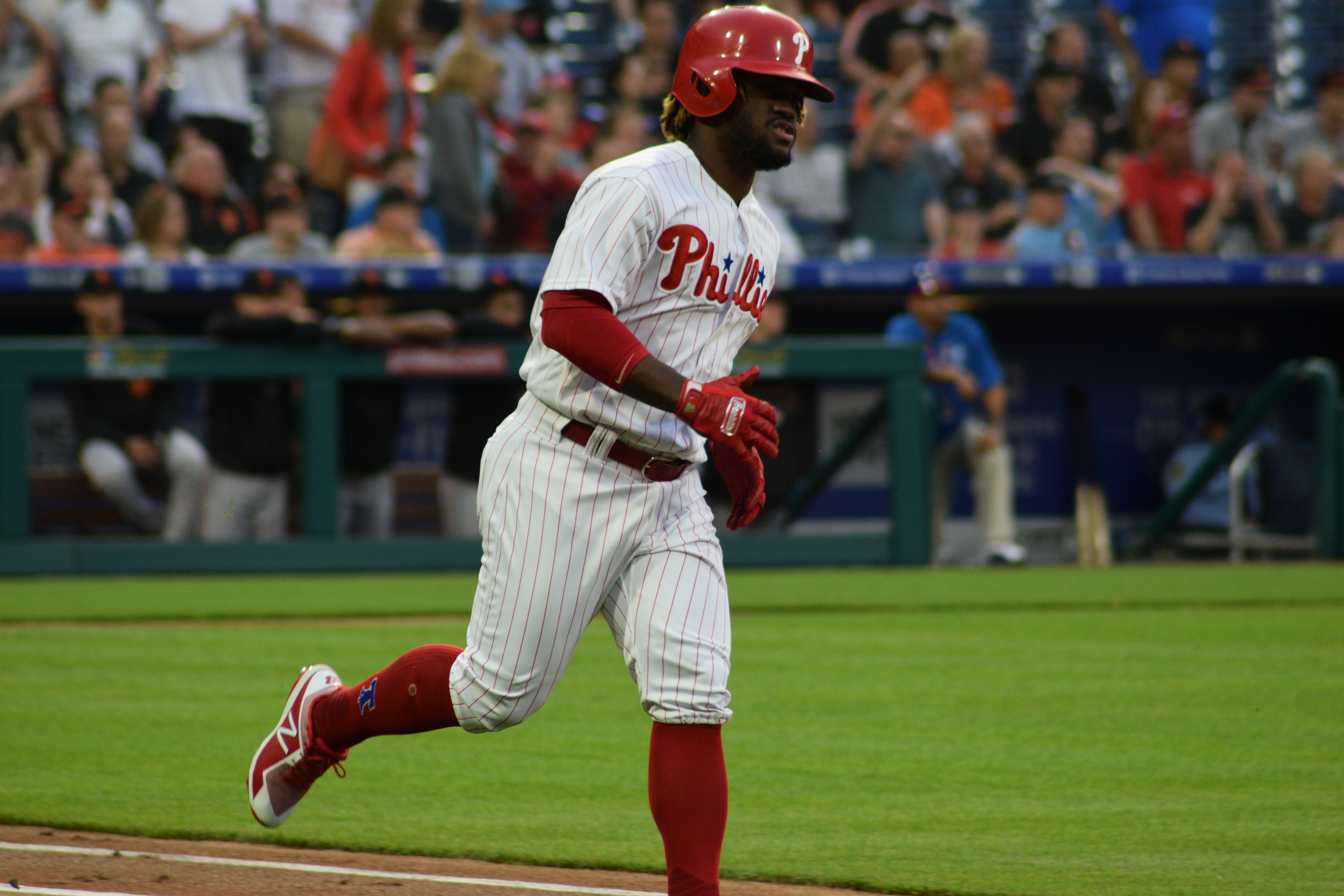
Herrera with the Phillies in 2018

The Phillies struggled in the first stretch of the 2017 season, posting a 6-22 record in the month of May. Herrera helped to ignite a winning streak at the start of June, joining Bobby Abreu and Heinie Sand as the third Phillies slugger to double in six consecutive games. He continued to clash with Mackanin, particularly for ignoring coaches' signals when deciding whether or not to steal a base. This came to a head at the end of June, when Herrera ignored third base coach Juan Samuel's stop sign and was caught stealing while representing the potential game-winning run against the Diamondbacks. Mackanin fined Herrera several hundred dollars for ignoring the signal, and he was out of the lineup for the Phillies' next game, against the Seattle Mariners. Mackanin, as well as Phillies teammates Freddy Galvis and Cameron Rupp, both criticized Herrera's lack of concentration and energy, and he was benched again at the end of July for failing to run out a dropped third strike in a game against the Houston Astros. Despite these frustrations, Herrera continued to dominate the team offensively, boosting his .256 average in the first half of the season to .383 in the month after the All-Star break and accumulating 36 doubles by August 18. Herrera finished the season with a .281 batting average, including 14 home runs, 56 RBIs, 67 runs scored, and 42 doubles.

Herrera began the 2018 season with a multi-game on-base streak, the longest to start a season since Matt Holliday reached base in his first 30 games in 2015. On May 7, he recorded his 500th career hit against the Washington Nationals. It was Herrera's 476th major league game, making him the first Phillies player to reach that milestone in fewer than 500 games since Chase Utley in 2007. On May 20, Herrera's on-base streak ended at 45 consecutive games, the fourth-longest in Phillies history. Although he did reach base in the ninth inning, he did so on a dropped third strike, which did not count towards his on-base numbers. Herrera followed his on-base streak with a five-game home run streak in June, tying a Phillies record. Midseason acquisitions like Asdrubal Cabrera and Wilson Ramos pushed Herrera further down the batting order as the season went on, and after he had a 4-for-29 stretch in the middle of August, manager Gabe Kapler considered replacing Herrera in center field with Roman Quinn. Despite setting career highs with 22 home runs and 71 RBIs, Herrera also set career worsts with a .255 batting average, .310 on-base percentage, and .730 on-base plus slugging in 597 plate appearances.

==== 2019–22 ====
During 2019 spring training, Herrera was in competition for an overcrowded outfield. Andrew McCutchen was guaranteed to start in left field, leaving Herrera, Quinn, Nick Williams, and Aaron Altherr to battle for the remaining two positions. Herrera was ultimately named the Phillies' starting center fielder, with Quinn on the injured list, Williams and Altherr on the bench, and new acquisition Bryce Harper in right field. His season was cut short when he was placed on administrative leave on May 28 following a domestic violence arrest in Atlantic City, New Jersey. On July 5, MLB announced that Herrera had violated the MLB Joint Domestic Violence, Sexual Assault and Child Abuse Policy, and that he would be suspended for the remainder of the season, retroactive to June 24. His suspension was thus for 85 regular season games, also including any potential postseason games. In the 39 games that Herrera played for the Phillies before his suspension, he batted .222 with one home run and 16 RBIs. With McCutchen recovering from knee surgery, Scott Kingery took over from Herrera as the Phillies' starting center fielder for the remainder of the season.

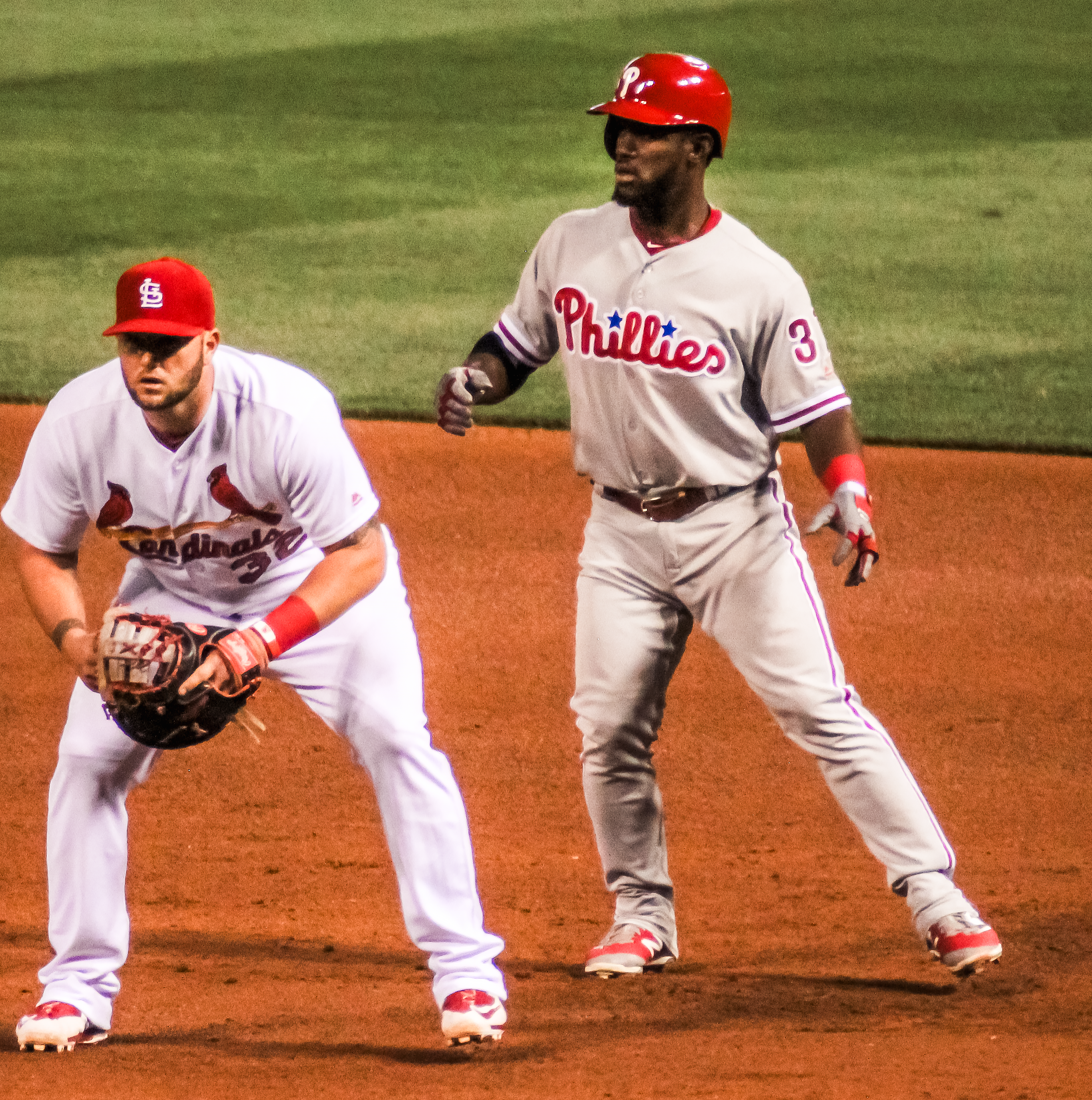
Odubel Herrera (right) with Cardinals 1st Baseman Matt Adams (left).

On January 14, 2020, Herrera was designated for assignment. The Phillies' outfield presence had been bolstered by Adam Haseley and Jay Bruce, and general manager Matt Klentak cited the fact that Herrera "wasn't very good for the first couple months last year" as a reason to remove him from the roster. Herrera cleared waivers on January 16 and was assigned outright to the Triple-A Lehigh Valley IronPigs. The COVID-19 pandemic forced the cancellation of both spring training and the 2020 Minor League Baseball season, preventing Herrera from playing that summer. He played two games later that year for the Gigantes del Cibao of the Dominican Winter League, recording two hits in seven at bats.

The Phillies invited Herrera to spring training in 2021, but he was ultimately optioned to an alternate site in Lehigh Valley, allowing Adam Haseley the starting center field job. After Haseley went on personal leave and Mickey Moniak struggled in the major leagues, the Phillies selected Herrera's major league contract on April 26, 2021. He played his first game since the suspension that same day, batting seventh and going 0-for-3 in a 2–1 victory over the St. Louis Cardinals. He served as the Phillies' leadoff hitter upon his return, but was benched at the start of July for a combination of unproductive batting and tendinitis in his left ankle, the latter of which placed Herrera on the 10-day injured list on July 9. He finished the 2021 season batting .260/.310/.416 with 13 home runs and 51 RBIs in 124 games. At the end of the season, the Phillies bought out the remaining $11.5 million of Herrera's contract, giving him $2.5 million instead. However, Philadelphia still retained arbitration control of Herrera. He was outrighted off the 40-man roster two days later and elected free agency.

On March 16, 2022, the Phillies re-signed Herrera to a one-year contract. He suffered an oblique strain during the Phillies' abbreviated spring training that caused him to miss the beginning of the 2022 MLB season. On August 2, 2022, Herrera was designated for assignment after batting .238/.279/.378 with 5 home runs in 62 games, and having the slowest sprint speed of all major league center fielders, at 26.9 feet/second. He cleared waivers and was released outright on August 6.

=== Kansas City Monarchs ===
On June 21, 2023, Herrera signed with the Kansas City Monarchs of the American Association of Professional Baseball. In 55 games for the Monarchs, he batted .292/.362/.403 with four home runs, 20 RBI, and 15 stolen bases. After the 2023 season, Herrera became a free agent.

=== Pericos de Puebla ===
On May 14, 2024, Herrera signed with the Pericos de Puebla of the Mexican League. In 17 games, he batted .279/.389/.459 with three home runs and 10 RBI.

=== Acereros de Monclova ===
On June 11, 2024, Herrera was traded to the Acereros de Monclova of the Mexican League in exchange for Chris Carter. In 37 games for Monclova, he slashed .256/.320/.387 with two home runs, 13 RBI and seven stolen bases.

On September 19, 2024, Herrera was traded back to the Pericos de Puebla in exchange for Chris Carter. He was released by the Pericos on November 27.

=== Centauros de La Guaira ===
On April 17, 2025, Herrera signed with the Centauros de La Guaira of the Venezuelan Major League.

== Player profile ==
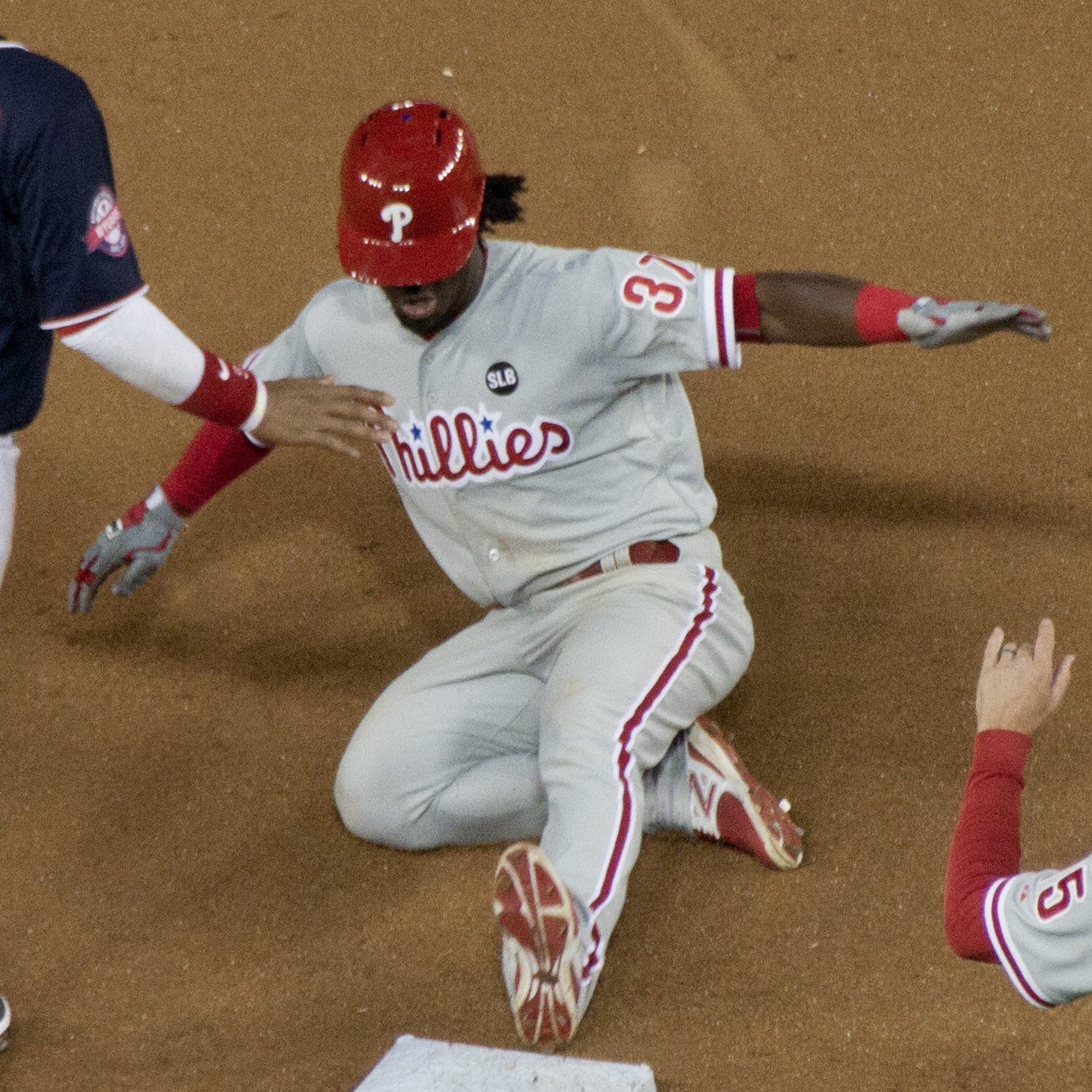
Herrera with the Phillies in 2015

Herrera captured the Phillies' attention early in his major league career for his plate discipline, selectively swinging at pitches both early and late in an appearance and displaying solid judgment. Pete Mackanin called Herrera a "perennial .300" batter in 2016, praising his pitch selection abilities. Herrera developed his plate discipline during the 2015–16 MLB offseason, as he was disappointed at his high strikeout numbers as a rookie. Herrera, a left-handed batter, takes a wide stance at the plate and angles his right leg towards first base, a technique that he developed when Venezuelan pitchers would pitch inside. That discipline in batting has not consistently translated to baserunning, and Herrera has been criticized by Phillies management for ignoring coaches' signals and not hustling to beat out throws.

Herrera is known for his extensive bat flipping, doing so every time he gets a hit, takes a walk, or grounds out to second base. In 2017, a Twitter account called "Odubel's Bat Flips" began counting every instance in which he flipped his bat after a plate appearance. The practice has been mocked by members of opposing teams, such as one instance in which Herrera flipped his bat for what ended up being a fly out to center field against the Astros. In addition to bat flipping, after making what he considers to be an impressive hit, Herrera will tap his hands against his helmet while making a gesture that mimics a pair of bull horns, a reference to his "El Torito" nickname. He developed these celebratory gestures while playing in Venezuela, where the practice is much more common.

== Personal life ==
Herrera has two daughters, Ana Paula and Danna Victoria.

When he first joined the Phillies, Herrera, a native Spanish speaker, had limited experience with English, and he learned the language by listening to and practicing conversations with teammates. As the Phillies lacked a full-time Spanish-English interpreter in 2015, Herrera would use bilingual teammates like Andres Blanco to communicate with reporters. In 2017, Phillies Hall of Famer Mike Schmidt came under fire for saying that the team could not build around Herrera due to a "language barrier". Schmidt apologized for the remark, saying he did not mean to be "disrespectful to Herrera and Latin players in general".

=== Domestic violence suspension ===
On May 27, 2019, following reports of a domestic violence incident at the Golden Nugget Atlantic City hotel and casino in New Jersey, Herrera was arrested and charged with simple assault. Authorities found Herrera's 20-year-old girlfriend with "visible signs of injury to her arms and neck", and he was taken into custody without incident. The maximum punishment for simple assault in the state of New Jersey is six months of jail time, as well as a $1,000 fine. Herrera was placed on administrative leave as MLB conducted its own investigation, and the Phillies both removed his player banners from Citizens Bank Park and asked MLB to strike his name from the All-Star ballot. Although the reported victim, Melany Martinez-Angulo, ultimately dropped the charges against Herrera, MLB suspended him for the remainder of the season for violations of the league's Joint Domestic Violence, Sexual Assault and Child Abuse Policy.

The Phillies' decision to allow Herrera to play with the team again during the 2021 season was met with a mixed response from Phillies fans and players. President of baseball operations Dave Dombrowski consulted with domestic violence organizations before agreeing to select Herrera's contract. Although the Phillies were not explicitly permitted to impose additional penalties on Herrera beyond the 85-game suspension placed by MLB, concerns with his performance and the impacts of the COVID-19 pandemic both kept Herrera from playing with the Phillies organization until spring training in 2021. Speaking to reporters in March 2021, Herrera apologized for the incident and acknowledged that he may not be universally forgiven. He also planned on speaking to every member of the Phillies clubhouse individually to address their concerns over the incident. First baseman and Phillies union representative Rhys Hoskins told reporters that "it's on [Herrera] to try to gain the trust of the organization back", while pitcher Aaron Nola said that he "believe[s] in second chances" and that he believed his teammates would be just as accepting.

== See also ==
- List of Major League Baseball players from Venezuela
