= Ricardo Pinto (baseball) =

Venezuelan baseball player (born 1994)

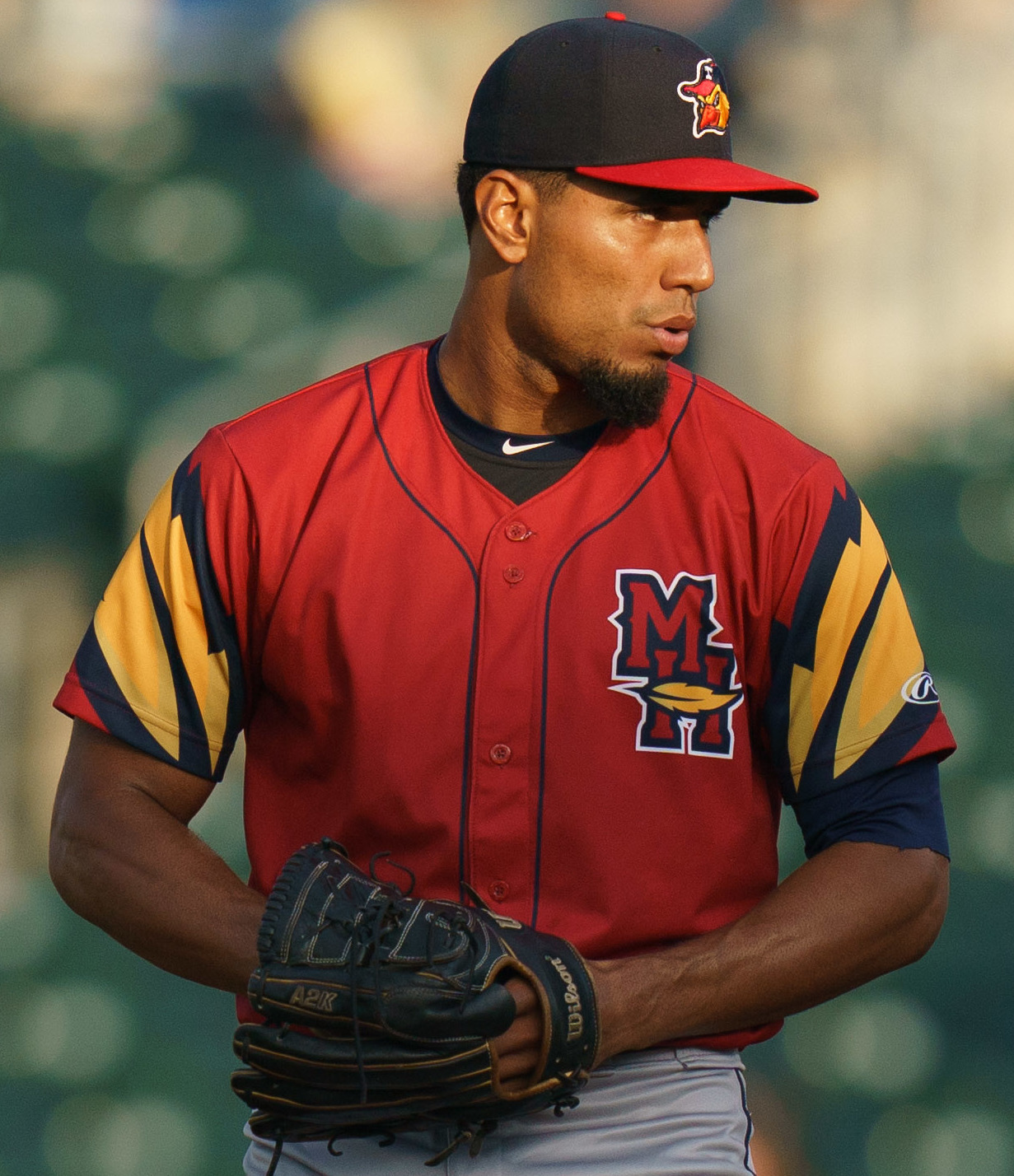
- Pinto with the Toledo Mud Hens in 2021

Diablos Rojos del México – No. 77
- Pitcher
- Born: January 20, 1994 (age 32); Guacara, Carabobo, Venezuela
- Bats: Right Throws: Right

Professional debut
- MLB: May 31, 2017, for the Philadelphia Phillies
- KBO: May 6, 2020, for the SK Wyverns
- CPBL: September 14, 2022, for the Rakuten Monkeys

MLB statistics (through 2024 season)
- Win–loss record: 1–2
- Earned run average: 9.07
- Strikeouts: 33

KBO statistics (through 2020 season)
- Win–loss record: 6–15
- Earned run average: 6.17
- Strikeouts: 112

CPBL statistics (through 2022 season)
- Win–loss record: 1–2
- Earned run average: 6.06
- Strikeouts: 9
- Stats at Baseball Reference

Teams
- Philadelphia Phillies (2017); Tampa Bay Rays (2019); SK Wyverns (2020); Rakuten Monkeys (2022); Philadelphia Phillies (2024)

Ricardo Antonio Pinto Valera (born January 20, 1994) is a Venezuelan professional baseball pitcher for the Diablos Rojos del México of the Mexican League. He has previously played in Major League Baseball (MLB) for the Philadelphia Phillies and Tampa Bay Rays, in the KBO League for the SK Wyverns, and in the Chinese Professional Baseball League (CPBL) for the Rakuten Monkeys.

== Career ==
=== Philadelphia Phillies ===
Pinto signed with the Philadelphia Phillies as an international free agent in December 2011. He made his professional debut with the Venezuelan Summer League Phillies in 2012 and also played with them in 2013. In 2014, he played for the Williamsport Crosscutters. Pinto spent 2015 with the Lakewood BlueClaws and Clearwater Threshers. He won the Paul Owens Award as the Phillies Minor League Pitcher of the Year after going 15–4 with a 2.97 earned run average (ERA) and 105 strikeouts. The Phillies added him to their 40-man roster after the 2016 season.

Pinto started the 2017 season with the Lehigh Valley IronPigs, and was called up to the Phillies on May 31, making his MLB debut the same day. In his debut against the Miami Marlins, Pinto pitched two innings in relief, allowing four runs on six hits along with three walks and a home run, and struck out two. On March 25, 2018, the Phillies designated Pinto for assignment.

=== Chicago White Sox ===
On March 28, 2018, Pinto was traded to the Chicago White Sox in exchange for international signing bonus pool money. He was designated for assignment on May 28. Pinto cleared waivers and was outrighted to the Triple–A Charlotte Knights on June 2. In 30 appearances split between Charlotte and the High–A Winston-Salem Dash, he accumulated a 5.95 ERA with 46 strikeouts across 65 innings of work. Pinto elected free agency following the season on November 2.

=== Tampa Bay Rays ===
On January 28, 2019, Pinto signed a minor league deal with the Tampa Bay Rays. On August 30, the Rays selected Pinto's contract.

=== San Francisco Giants ===
On September 6, 2019, the San Francisco Giants claimed Pinto off waivers from the Rays. Pinto was designated for assignment on November 5.

=== SK Wyverns ===
Pinto was released by the Giants on November 12, so he could sign with the SK Wyverns of the KBO League. He became a free agent following the season. In one season of work in the KBO, Pinto pitched to a 6–15 record with a 6.17 ERA and 112 strikeouts in 162 innings of work.

=== Detroit Tigers ===
On February 20, 2021, Pinto signed a minor league contract with the Detroit Tigers organization. Pinto split the year between the Double-A Erie SeaWolves and the Triple-A Toledo Mud Hens, recording a cumulative 14–4 record and 4.29 ERA with 107 strikeouts in 123.2 innings of work between the two teams. He elected minor league free agency following the season on November 7.

On March 13, 2022, Pinto re-signed with the Tigers organization on a new minor league deal. He was released on July 3, 2022.

=== Rakuten Monkeys ===
On July 28, 2022, Pinto signed with the Rakuten Monkeys of the Chinese Professional Baseball League. Pinto appeared in 4 games (3 starts) for Rakuten, struggling to a 1–2 record and 6.06 ERA with 9 strikeouts in 16.1 innings pitched.

=== Tecolotes de los Dos Laredos ===
On February 8, 2023, Pinto signed with the Tecolotes de los Dos Laredos of the Mexican League. In 10 starts, Pinto went 2–3 with a 5.44 ERA and 41 strikeouts over 49.2 innings. He was released on June 14, 2023.

=== Diablos Rojos del México ===
On June 19, 2023, Pinto signed with the Diablos Rojos del México of the Mexican League. In 9 games (5 starts) for México, he posted a 3.34 ERA with 18 strikeouts in 32 1/3 innings of work.

=== Philadelphia Phillies (second stint) ===
On February 18, 2024, Pinto signed a minor league contract to return to the Phillies. On April 2, he had his contract selected to the active roster. He made his return to the MLB that night, earning his first career save while pitching 4 innings in a win over the Cincinnati Reds. In 6 appearances for Philadelphia, Pinto struggled to a 10.97 ERA with 8 strikeouts across 10 2/3 innings of work. He was designated for assignment on April 28 when Taijuan Walker returned from the injured list. Pinto elected free agency after clearing waivers on May 2. He was re-signed to a minor league contract on May 9. In 16 games (6 starts) for the Triple–A Lehigh Valley IronPigs, Pinto posted a 4–1 record and 5.27 ERA with 40 strikeouts across 56 1/3 innings pitched. He was released by the Phillies organization on August 12.

=== Diablos Rojos del México (second stint) ===
On January 29, 2025, Pinto signed with the Diablos Rojos del México of the Mexican League. He made 12 starts for México, logging a 2-1 record and 5.62 ERA with 35 strikeouts across 49 2/3 innings pitched. With the team, Pinto won the Serie del Rey.
