= Jake Thompson =

American baseball player (born 1994)

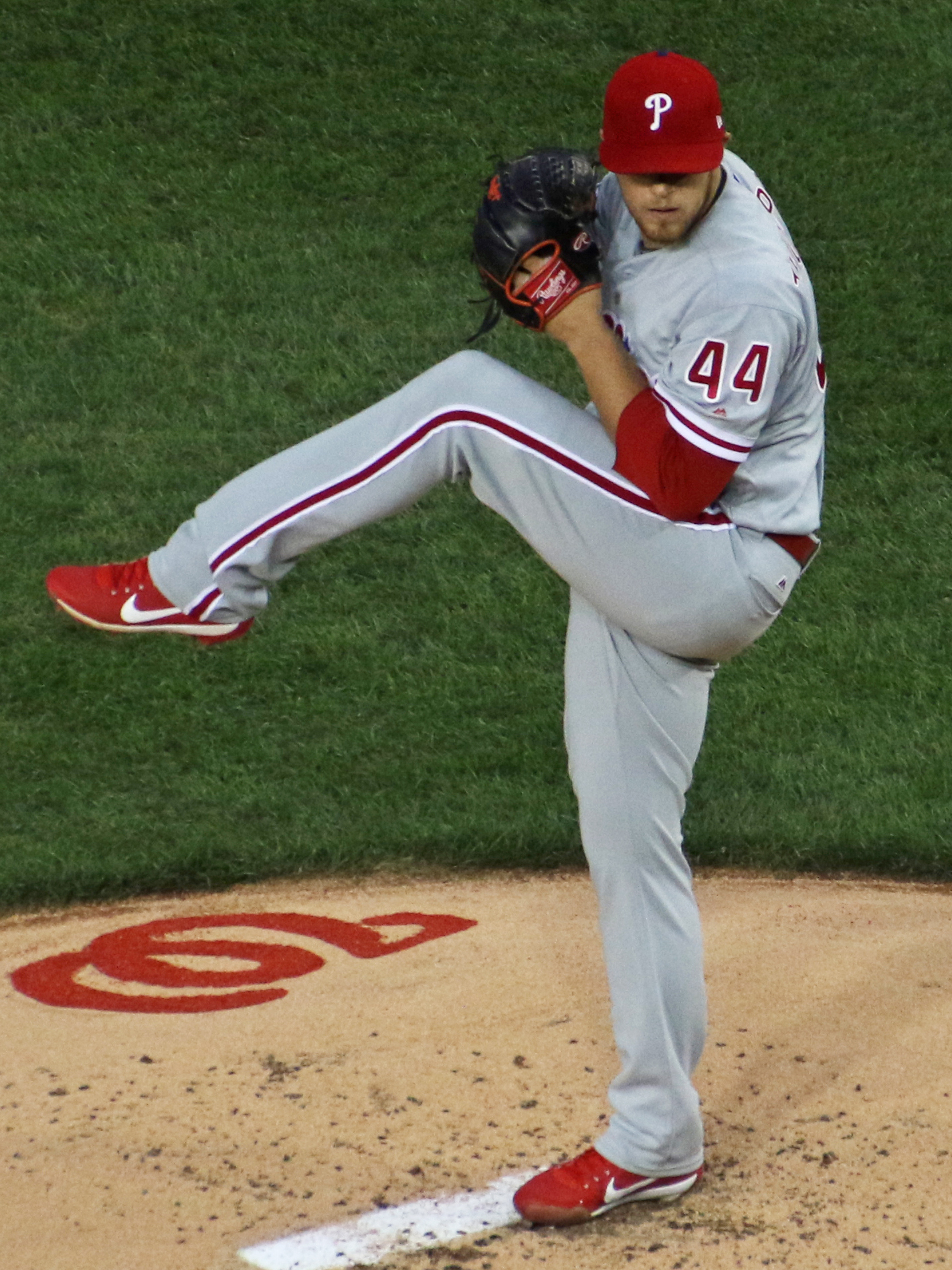
- Thompson pitching for the Philadelphia Phillies in 2017

Piratas de Campeche – No. 32
- Pitcher
- Born: January 31, 1994 (age 32); Dallas, Texas, U.S.
- Bats: Right Throws: Right

Professional debut
- MLB: August 6, 2016, for the Philadelphia Phillies
- KBO: March 26, 2019, for the Lotte Giants

MLB statistics (through 2018 season)
- Win–loss record: 7–8
- Earned run average: 4.87
- Strikeouts: 81

KBO statistics (through 2019 season)
- Win–loss record: 2–3
- Earned run average: 4.74
- Strikeouts: 60
- Stats at Baseball Reference

Teams
- Philadelphia Phillies (2016–2018); Lotte Giants (2019)
Medals
Men's baseball
Representing United States
Pan American Games
Silver medal – second place	2015 Toronto	Team

Jacob Keith Thompson (born January 31, 1994) is an American professional baseball pitcher for the Piratas de Campeche of the Mexican League. He has previously played in Major League Baseball (MLB) for the Philadelphia Phillies, and in the KBO League for the Lotte Giants.

== Career ==
=== Amateur career ===
Thompson attended Rockwall-Heath High School in Heath, Texas. There, in his senior year he was 12-3 with a 1.90 ERA and batted .504 with 15 home runs and 58 RBIs in 131 at bats, and Baseball America named him a First-Team High School All-American. He committed to attend Texas Christian University (TCU) on a college baseball scholarship to play for the TCU Horned Frogs baseball team. However, the Detroit Tigers selected Thompson in the second round of the 2012 MLB draft, and he signed with the Tigers for a $532,000 signing bonus.

=== Detroit Tigers ===
==== Minor leagues ====
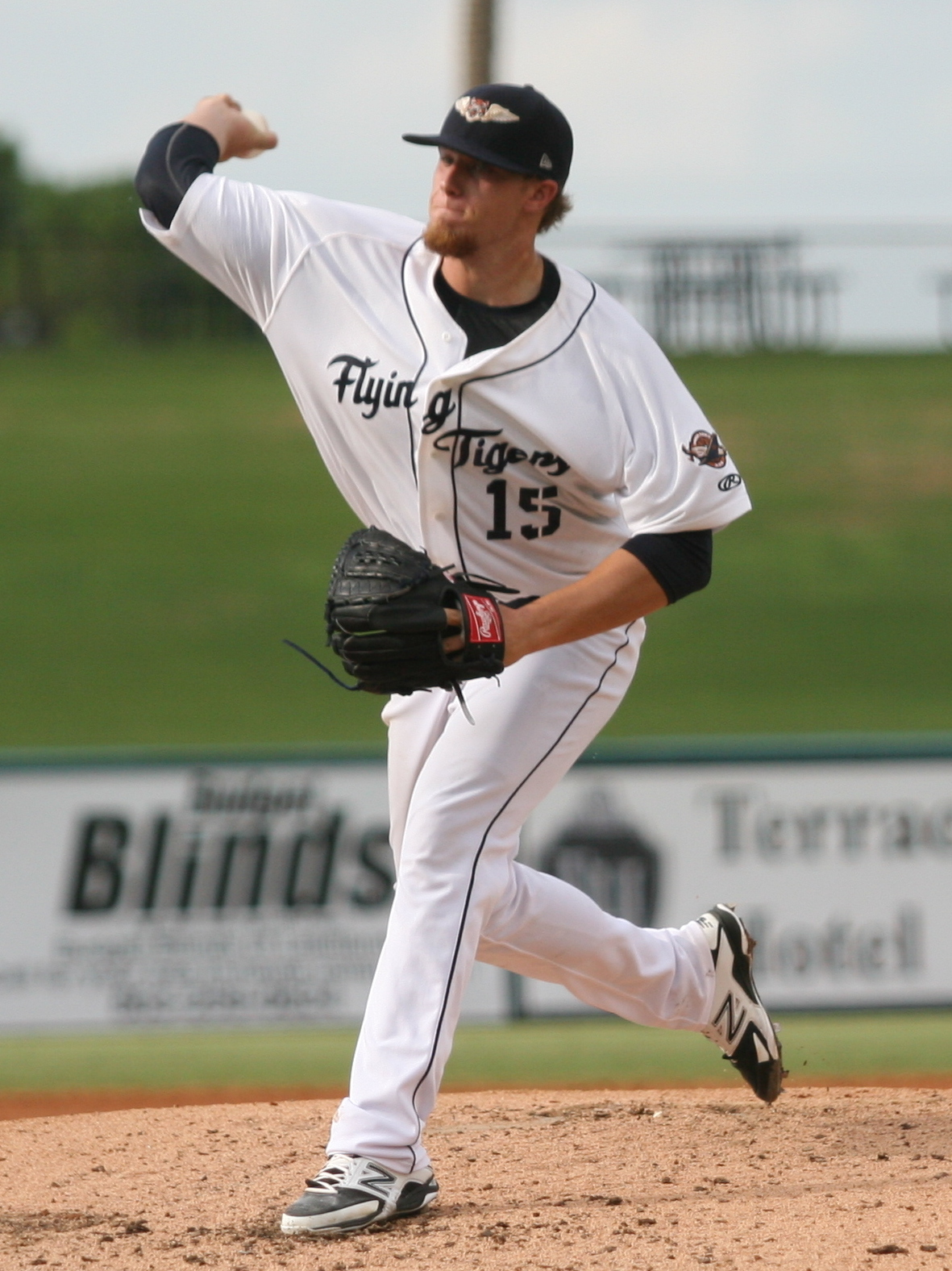
Thompson with the Lakeland Flying Tigers in 2014

He made his professional debut for the Gulf Coast League Tigers of the Rookie-level Gulf Coast League, recording six strikeouts over four innings with one hit allowed. He finished his first season 1–2 with a 1.91 earned run average (ERA) and 31 strikeouts over 28 1/3 innings in seven starts. Right-handed batters hit .125 against him.

Thompson played the 2013 season with the West Michigan Whitecaps of the Single-A Midwest League. He pitched in 17 games with 16 starts, going 3–3 with a 3.13 ERA and 91 strikeouts in 83 1/3 innings. He started the 2014 season with the Lakeland Flying Tigers of the High-A Florida State League. He was a mid-season Florida State League All Star. In July, Thompson played in the All-Star Futures Game, and was promoted to the Erie SeaWolves of the Double-A Eastern League.

=== Texas Rangers ===
On July 23, 2014, the Tigers traded Thompson and Corey Knebel to the Texas Rangers in exchange for reliever Joakim Soria. The Rangers assigned Thompson to the Frisco RoughRiders of the Double-A Texas League. After the 2014 season, MLB.com named him the 6th-best prospect in Texas's minor league system. In 2015 he was a Texas League mid-season All-Star.

=== Philadelphia Phillies ===
On July 31, 2015, Thompson was traded to the Philadelphia Phillies along with Nick Williams, Jorge Alfaro, Alec Asher, Matt Harrison, and Jerad Eickhoff in exchange for Cole Hamels and Jake Diekman. Thompson pitched for the Reading Fightin Phils of the Double-A Eastern League. After the 2015 season, Baseball America him the 3rd-best prospect in the Phillies minor league system.

In 2016, Thompson pitched for the Lehigh Valley IronPigs of the Triple-A International League. He led the league with a 2.50 ERA and tied for the most wins with 11. He won the International League Most Valuable Pitcher Award. He was also named an International League Post-Season All Star, and Baseball America Triple-A All Star.

==== Major leagues ====
Thompson received his MLB callup on August 6, 2016, as the starting pitcher against the San Diego Padres in a 9–7 loss. He earned his first MLB win on August 12, in a 10–6 victory over the Colorado Rockies at Citizens Bank Park. He also struck out four batters in the second inning of that game. Thompson finished his rookie season with a 3-6 record with a 5.70 ERA and 32 strikeouts over ten MLB starts.

During the 2017 season Thompson split time between the Phillies and Lehigh Valley, posting a 3-2 record with a 3.88 ERA and 35 strikeouts in 11 appearances (8 starts).

Thompson recorded his first MLB career save on April 8, 2018 against the Miami Marlins, pitching three scoreless innings to end a 20-1 blowout. Despite this performance, Thompson was optioned Triple-A immediately after the game. He was designated for assignment by the Phillies on August 10.

=== Milwaukee Brewers ===
On August 14, 2018, the Phillies traded Thompson to the Milwaukee Brewers in exchange for cash considerations, and Milwaukee optioned him to the Colorado Springs Sky Sox of the Triple-A Pacific Coast League. He was designated for assignment on August 31. Thompson was removed from the 40–man roster and outrighted to Triple-A on September 3. He elected free agency following the season on November 2.

=== Lotte Giants ===
On December 13, 2018, Thompson signed a one-year, $900,000 contract with the Lotte Giants of the KBO League.

On June 9, 2019, he was released by the Giants.

=== Detroit Tigers (second stint) ===
On July 25, 2019, Thompson signed a minor league contract with the Detroit Tigers organization. In 7 games (5 starts) for the High-A Lakeland Flying Tigers and Double-A Erie SeaWolves, Thompson registered a cumulative 5-0 record and 1.99 ERA with 34 strikeouts in 31 2/3 innings of work. He became a free agent following the season on November 4.

=== Los Angeles Angels ===
On January 22, 2020, Thompson signed a minor league contract with the Los Angeles Angels organization. Thompson did not play in a game in 2020 due to the cancellation of the minor league season because of the COVID-19 pandemic. He became a free agent on November 2.

=== Leones de Yucatán ===
On May 25, 2021, Thompson signed with the Leones de Yucatán of the Mexican League. He started 11 games for the team, posting a 4-3 record and 3.02 ERA with 35 strikeouts in 59 2/3 innings pitched. The following year, Thompson made 17 appearances (14 starts) for the team, but struggled to a 5-4 record and 6.93 ERA with 49 strikeouts in 61 innings of work. Thompson won the Mexican League Championship with the Leones in 2022. In 2023, Thompson made 18 starts for Yucatán, posting a 6–3 record and 2.71 ERA with 83 strikeouts in 89 2/3 innings of work.

=== Caliente de Durango ===
On November 22, 2023, Thompson was traded to the Toros de Tijuana of the Mexican League in exchange for Xorge Carrillo. On April 5, 2024, Thompson was loaned to the Caliente de Durango. In five starts, he posted a 1–2 record with a 3.24 ERA and 16 strikeouts over 25 innings.

=== Toros de Tijuana ===
On May 28, 2024, Thompson was returned back to the Toros de Tijuana of the Mexican League. In 5 starts for Tijuana, Thompson struggled to an 8.35 ERA with 7 strikeouts across 18 1/3 innings pitched.

=== Bravos de León ===
On July 3, 2024, Thompson was traded to the Bravos de León of the Mexican League in exchange for Wendolyn Bautista. In 3 starts for León, he posted a 1–1 record and 3.52 ERA with 9 strikeouts across 15 1/3 innings pitched. Thompson became a free agent following the season.

=== Caliente de Durango (second stint) ===
On March 5, 2025, Thompson signed with the Caliente de Durango of the Mexican League. In 11 starts for Durango, he struggled to a 2-4 record and 6.94 ERA with 29 strikeouts across 46 2/3 innings pitched. Thompson was released by Durango on June 18.

=== Piratas de Campeche ===
On July 10, 2025, Thompson signed with the Piratas de Campeche of the Mexican League. In four starts for Campeche, Thompson logged an 0–1 record and 6.60 ERA with seven strikeouts over 15 innings of work.

== See also ==
- List of Major League Baseball single-inning strikeout leaders
- List of baseball players who have represented more than one nation
