= Xorge Carrillo =

Mexican baseball player (born 1989)

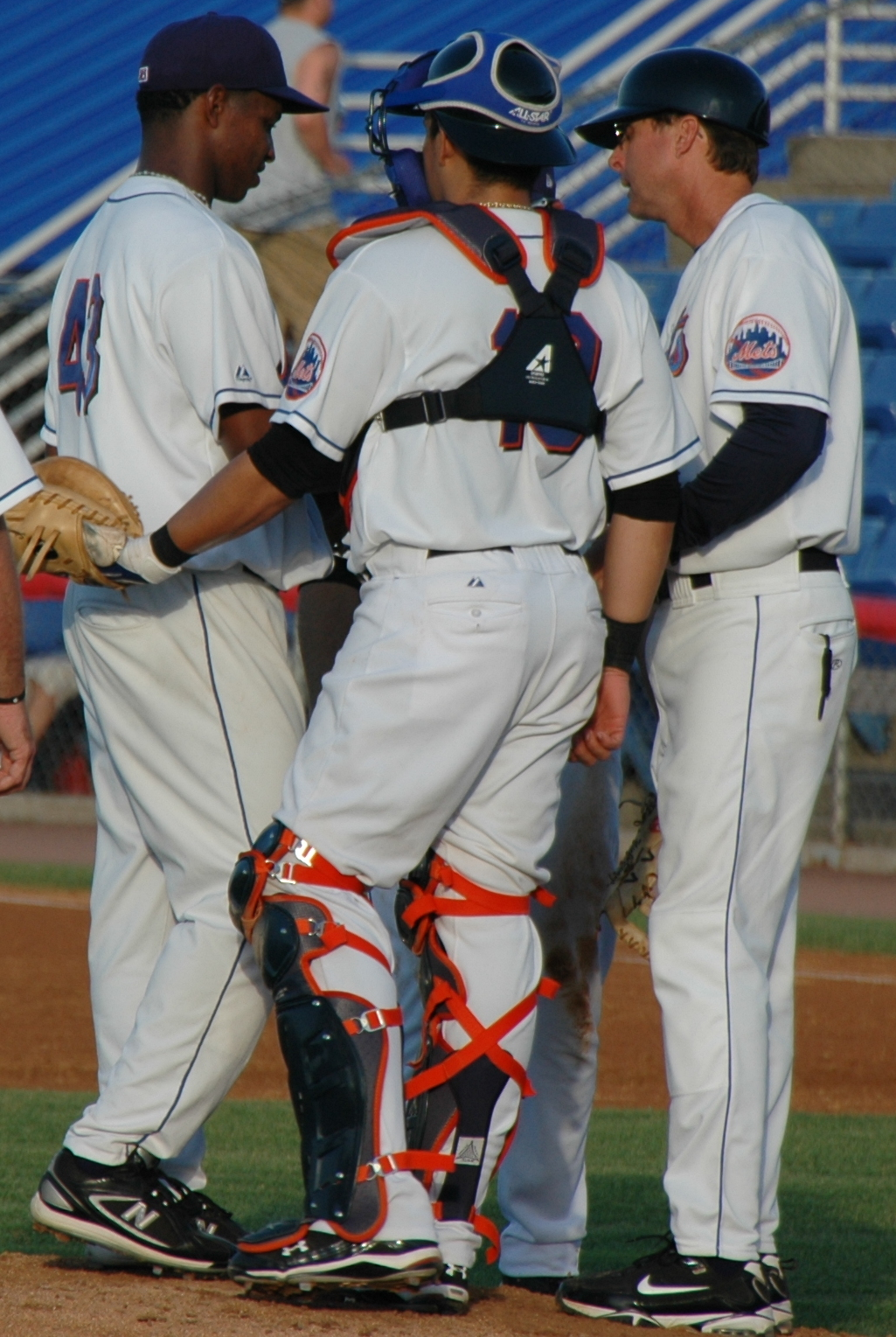
- Carrillo (center) with the Binghamton Mets in 2010

Leones de Yucatán – No. 24
- Catcher
- Born: April 12, 1989 (age 37); Tijuana, Baja California, Mexico
- Bats: Right Throws: Right
- Stats at Baseball Reference

Xorge Carrillo (born April 12, 1989) is a Mexican professional baseball catcher for the Leones de Yucatán of the Mexican League and for the Águilas de Mexicali of the Liga Mexicana del Pacifico. He represented Mexico in the 2017 World Baseball Classic, 2019 Pan American Games Qualifier, and 2019 exhibition games against Japan.

== Career ==
Carrillo was drafted by the Toronto Blue Jays in the 28th round of the 2007 Major League Baseball draft out of McClintock High School, but did not sign. He was again drafted in the 29th round of the 2009 Major League Baseball draft out of Central Arizona College, this time by the Cleveland Indians, but again did not sign. He then went on to attend Arizona State University, where he played baseball for the Sun Devils. He was drafted for a third time in the 2010 Major League Baseball draft, selected in the 23rd round by the San Diego Padres, but for a third time did not sign and returned to ASU. He was drafted for a fourth time in the 14th round of the 2011 Major League Baseball draft by the New York Mets and agreed to sign with the club.

=== New York Mets ===
He made his professional debut with the Low-A Brooklyn Cyclones, appearing in 27 games for the club. In 2012, Carrillo played for the Single-A Savannah Sand Gnats, but only played in 11 games. He split the 2013 season between the High-A St. Lucie Mets and the Double-A Binghamton Mets, batting a cumulative .278/.331/.330 in 36 games for the two clubs. The next year, Carrillo split the year between Binghamton and the Triple-A Las Vegas 51s, slashing .285/.355/.357 with 2 home runs and 22 RBI. He was invited to Spring Training for the 2015 season, but did not make the club and was assigned to Binghamton, where he batted .240/.318/.382 in 94 games. In 2016, Carrillo spent the majority of the year in Binghamton, also playing in 5 games for Las Vegas with a cumulative batting line of .272/.347/.362 in 85 games. He was invited to Spring Training for a second time in 2017 but again did not make the team and was assigned to Las Vegas. With Las Vegas, Carrillo batted .270/.320/.425 with 9 home runs and 44 RBI before electing free agency on November 6, 2017.

=== Tampa Bay Rays ===
On January 31, 2018, Carrillo signed a minor league contract with the Tampa Bay Rays organization and was invited to spring training. Carrillo did not make the club and was assigned to the Triple-A Durham Bulls.

=== Toros de Tijuana ===
On July 3, 2018, Carrillo was assigned to the Toros de Tijuana of the Mexican League and finished the season with Tijuana. In 2019, Carrillo batted .307/.383/.458 in 63 games. Carrillo did not play in a game in 2020 due to the cancellation of the Mexican League season because of the COVID-19 pandemic.

In 2023, Carrillo played in 60 games for Tijuana, batting .233/.303/.323 with 3 home runs and 26 RBI.

=== Leones de Yucatán ===
On November 22, 2023, Carrillo was traded to the Leones de Yucatán of the Mexican League in exchange for Jake Thompson. However, he was placed on the 60–day injured list prior to the season on March 8, 2024.
