= Brock Stassi =

American baseball player (born 1989)

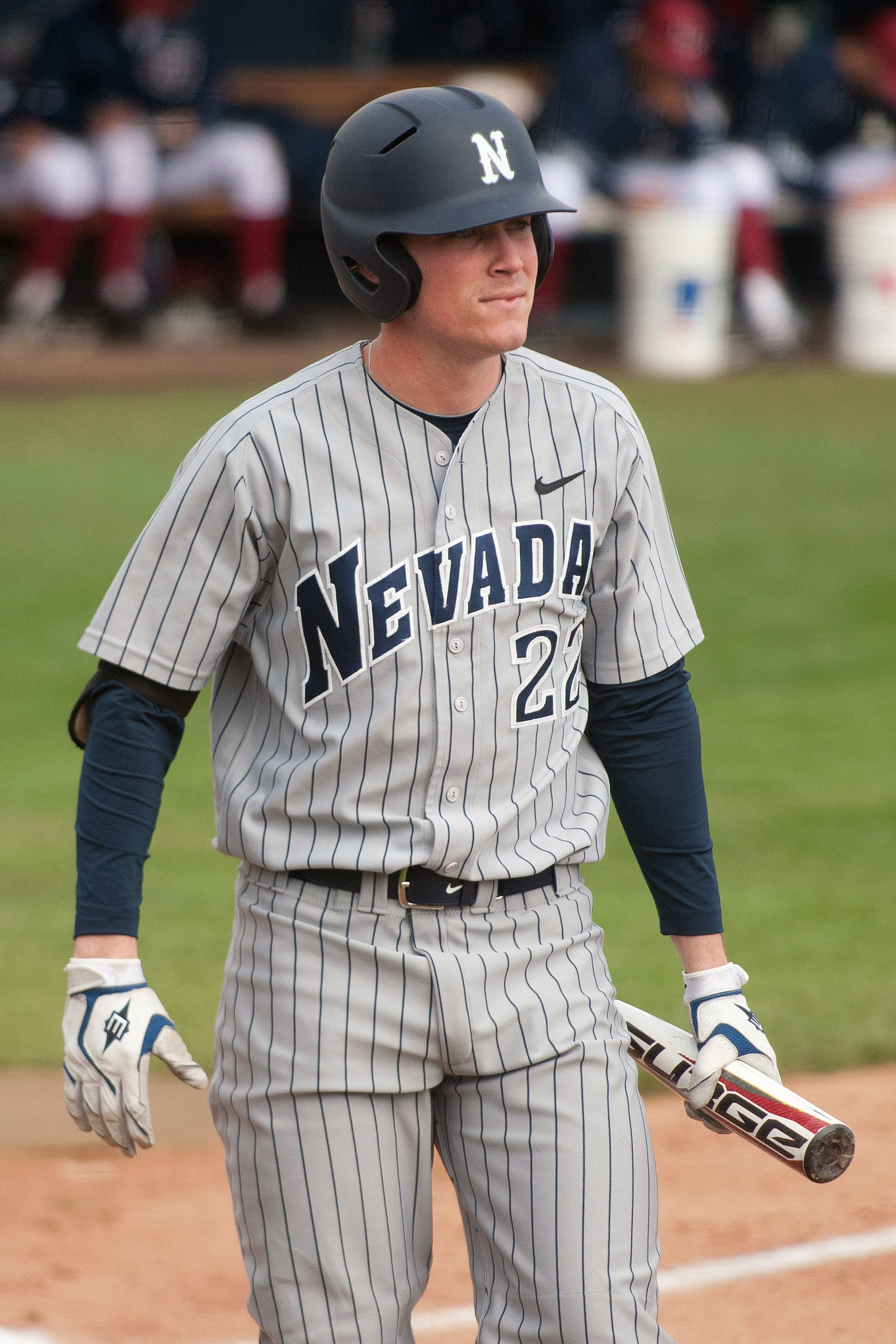
- Stassi with the Nevada Wolf Pack in 2011
- First baseman
- Born: August 7, 1989 (age 36); Yuba City, California, U.S.
- Batted: Left Threw: Left

MLB debut
- April 3, 2017, for the Philadelphia Phillies

Last MLB appearance
- July 18, 2017, for the Philadelphia Phillies

MLB statistics
- Batting average: .167
- Home runs: 2
- Runs batted in: 7
- Stats at Baseball Reference

Teams
- Philadelphia Phillies (2017)

Brock James Stassi (/ˈstæsi/ STASS-ee; born August 7, 1989) is an American former professional baseball first baseman. Selected by the Philadelphia Phillies in the 33rd round of the 2011 MLB draft out of University of Nevada, Reno, Stassi made his Major League Baseball (MLB) debut for the club on April 3, 2017.

== Early life ==
From Northern California, Stassi attended Barry Elementary School, after which he attended Yuba City High School, for which his father was the baseball coach.

== Playing career ==
=== Amateur ===
In 2009, he played collegiate summer baseball with the Orleans Firebirds of the Cape Cod Baseball League. Stassi was drafted by the Cleveland Indians in 2010, but decided to stay at school.

Stassi was a two-way player in his final three years at University of Nevada, Reno. In 2010, Stassi was named the Western Athletic Conference Pitcher of the Year and also earned second-team All-WAC utility honors. He hit 360 with 19 doubles, driving in 34 runs and scoring 29 times in 55 games for the Nevada Wolf Pack, earning First Team All-WAC honors as a first baseman during his senior season.

=== Philadelphia Phillies ===
The Phillies selected Stassi in the 33rd round of the 2011 MLB draft out of University of Nevada, Reno. Stassi debuted with the Low-A Williamsport Crosscutters in 2011, slashing .200/.291/.233 in 50 games. He split the next season between Williamsport, the Single-A Lakewood BlueClaws, and the High-A Clearwater Threshers, posting a .243/.329/.358 slash line with 3 home runs and 33 RBI. He returned to Clearwater for the 2013 season, slashing .295/.347/.399 with 3 home runs and 32 RBI in 89 games. In 2014, Stassi played for the Double-A Reading Fightin Phils, hitting .232/.302/.327 with 8 home runs and 44 RBI.

His breakout season came with Reading in 2015, when he posted a .300/.394/.470 slash line with career-highs in home runs (15) and RBI (90) in 133 games, helping lead Reading to first place in the Eastern League Division standings while earning an All-Star berth. Additionally, Stassi led the league in RBI and doubles (32), ending second in total bases (225) and walks (77), third in on OBP and runs scored (76), fifth in hits (140), and sixth in home runs. In addition to his offensive contributions, Stassi led Eastern League first baseman with a .995 fielding percentage, making five errors in 112 games. At the end of the season, he was selected as the winner of the 2015 Eastern League Most Valuable Player Award. In 2016, playing for the Triple-A Lehigh Valley IronPigs in the International League, he hit .267/.369/.437 with 12 home runs and 58 RBI.

Stassi made the Phillies' Opening Day roster in 2017. He made his major league debut on Opening Day. In 51 games for Philadelphia, he batted .167/.278/.295 with 2 home runs and 7 RBI. Stassi was designated for assignment on August 31, 2017, to make room for newly-acquired Juan Nicasio on the 40-man roster. Stassi elected free agency on November 6.

=== Minnesota Twins ===
On December 8, 2017, Stassi signed a minor league contract with the Minnesota Twins. He was assigned to the Triple-A Rochester Red Wings to begin the 2018 season. After hitting .315/.412/.452 with 2 home runs and 10 RBI, Stassi was released from the organization on May 25, 2018.

=== New Britain Bees ===
On June 21, 2018, Stassi signed with the New Britain Bees of the Atlantic League of Professional Baseball. Stassi played in 40 games for New Britain, posting a .361/.458/.592 slash line with 5 home runs and 36 RBI.

=== San Francisco Giants ===
On August 10, 2018, Stassi's contract was purchased by the San Francisco Giants. He finished the season with the Triple-A Sacramento River Cats, hitting .391/.536/.547 with 11 RBI. He elected free agency after the season, but re-signed with the team on November 9. In 2019 with Sacramento, Stassi went 3-for-13 in 3 games. On Mother's Day, Stassi tore a tendon in his wrist and missed the remainder of the season. On November 4, 2019, he elected free agency.

=== Long Island Ducks ===
On February 23, 2020, Stassi signed a minor league contract with the Oakland Athletics organization. He was released by the A’s in March prior to the beginning of the season. On April 10, Stassi signed with the Long Island Ducks of the Atlantic League of Professional Baseball. He did not play a game for the team because of the cancellation of the ALPB season due to the COVID-19 pandemic and became a free agent after the year.

On May 17, 2021, Stassi re-signed with the Ducks for the 2021 season. In 14 games for the Ducks, Stassi slashed .191/.309/.298 with 7 RBI.

=== Philadelphia Phillies (second stint) ===
On June 14, 2021, Stassi had his contract purchased by the Philadelphia Phillies organization and was assigned to the Double-A Reading Fightin Phils. He appeared in 25 games for Reading, limping to a .169/.348/.254 slash with 2 home runs and 8 RBI. He elected free agency on November 7, 2021.

== Coaching career ==
=== Philadelphia Phillies ===
On January 31, 2023, Stassi was hired by the Philadelphia Phillies organization to serve as the hitting coach for their High-A affiliate, the Jersey Shore BlueClaws.

He was named hitting coach for the Double–A Reading Fightin' Phils for the 2024 season.

=== Seattle Mariners ===
On January 16, 2025, the Seattle Mariners hired Stassi to serve as the hitting coach for their Low-A affiliate, the Modesto Nuts.

== Personal life ==
Stassi's father, grandfather, and great-grandfather played as catchers in the minor leagues. His younger brother, Max Stassi, is a catcher who debuted with the Houston Astros in 2013.

Brock and Max hold an annual charity event that began in 2009 in their hometown of Yuba City, California; the money collected goes to 12 food banks within a 50-mile radius of Yuba City and Hands of Hope, a charity that offers support to homeless children and their families. The event consists of a home run derby between the brothers at the Yuba City High School field. In 2014, the event was expanded to include a home run derby with one player from each of eight local high schools, taking donations based on the number of homers hit, as well as accepting flat-rate donations.
