= Edubray Ramos =

Venezuelan baseball player (born 1992)

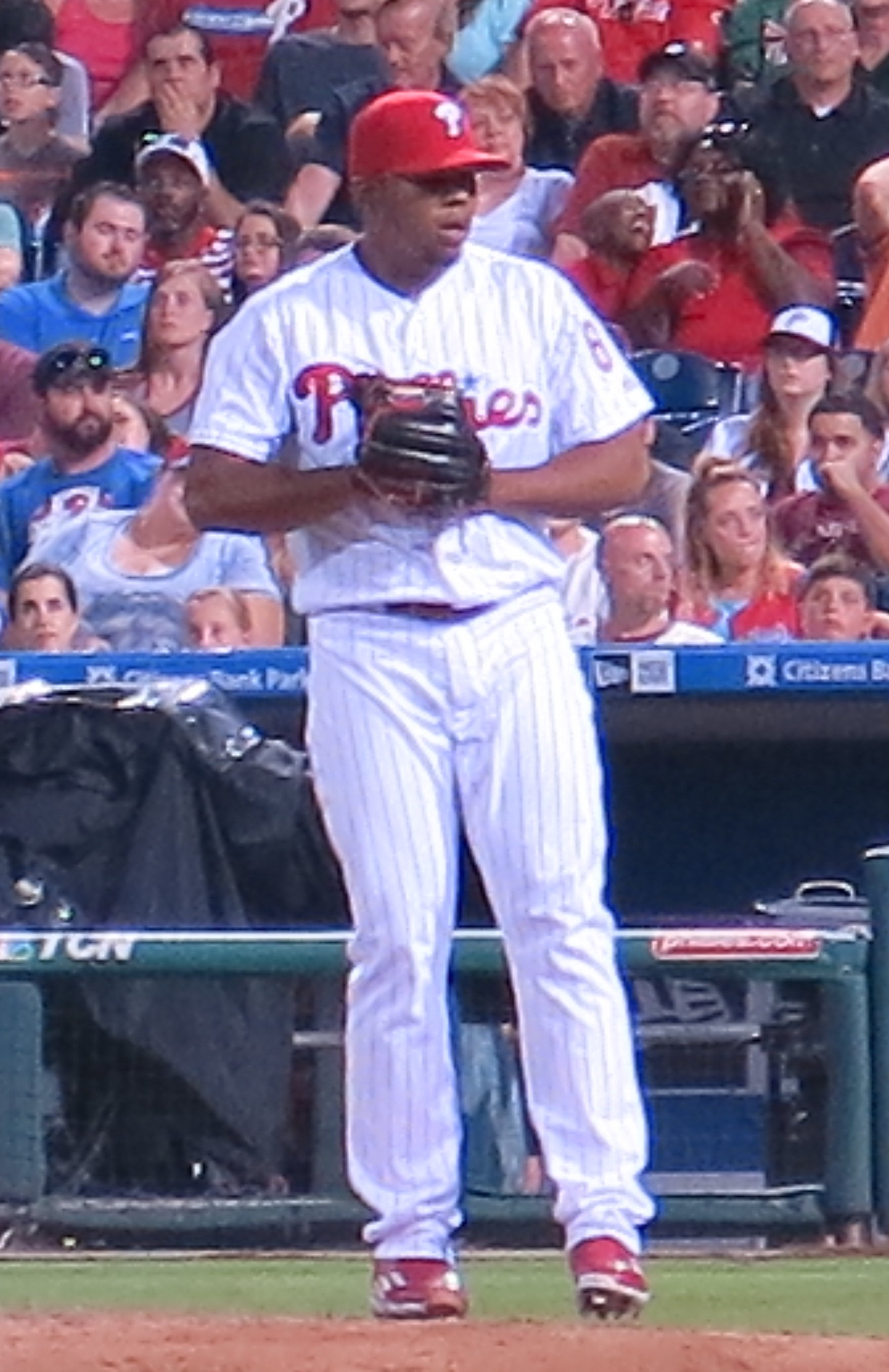
- Ramos with the Phillies in 2016
- Pitcher
- Born: December 19, 1992 (age 33); Caracas, Venezuela
- Batted: Right Threw: Right

MLB debut
- June 24, 2016, for the Philadelphia Phillies

Last MLB appearance
- September 23, 2019, for the Philadelphia Phillies

MLB statistics
- Win–loss record: 7–11
- Earned run average: 3.71
- Strikeouts: 168
- Stats at Baseball Reference

Teams
- Philadelphia Phillies (2016–2019)

Edubray Eduar Ramos (pronounced eh-doo-BRAY RAH-mohs; born December 19, 1992) is a Venezuelan former professional baseball pitcher. He played in Major League Baseball (MLB) for the Philadelphia Phillies. Ramos signed with the St. Louis Cardinals as an international free agent in 2010 and made his MLB debut in 2016 for Philadelphia.

== Early life ==
Ramos was born in Caracas, Venezuela. He attended Liceo Diego Ibarra Privado, where he played volleyball and baseball, graduating in 2008.

== Career ==
=== St. Louis Cardinals ===
Ramos signed with the St. Louis Cardinals as an international free agent in May 2010. They released him in February 2011.

=== Philadelphia Phillies ===
On November 21, 2012, he signed as a free agent with the Philadelphia Phillies. In 2013 he pitched for the VSL Phillies of the Venezuelan Summer League, and was 2–3 with one save and a 5.08 ERA with 36 strikeouts in 33 2/3 innings, averaging 9.6 strikeouts per 9 innings.

On August 4, 2014, while pitching for the Low–A Williamsport Crosscutters he was the New York-Penn League Pitcher of the Week. He was named Phillies Minor League Pitcher of the Week on September 1. Pitching for the VS Phillies, GCL Phillies, and Williamsport in 2014, he was 2–1 with 10 saves and an 0.81 ERA, and 48 strikeouts in 44 1/3 innings, averaging 9.7 strikeouts per 9 innings pitched.

On June 15, 2015, while pitching for the High–A Clearwater Threshers, he was the Florida State League Pitcher of the Week and Phillies Minor League Pitcher of the Week. Pitching for Clearwater and the Double–A Reading Fightin Phils in 2015, he was 4–6 with eight saves and a 2.07 ERA, and 65 strikeouts in 69 2/3 innings. Pitching for the Glendale Desert Dogs in the Arizona Fall League in 2015, he was named a Rising Star and an AFL All Star. On November 20, 2015, the Phillies added Ramos to their 40-man roster to protect him from the Rule 5 draft.

Pitching for Reading and the Triple–A Lehigh Valley IronPigs in 2016, he was 2–1 with 10 saves and a 1.16 ERA, and 41 strikeouts in 38 2/3 innings, averaging 9.5 strikeouts per 9 innings. He was named Phillies Minor League Pitcher of the Month for May.

Ramos was promoted to the major leagues for the first time on June 24, 2016. He made his MLB debut the same night against the San Francisco Giants, retiring the only batter he faced. Three weeks later he earned his first MLB decision, when the Phillies defeated the New York Mets. In 2016 with the Phillies he was 1–3 with a 3.83 ERA, and 40 strikeouts in 40 innings. He struck out 25% of the batters he faced with the Phillies. His fastball averaged 95 miles per hour.

In 2017 with the Phillies he was 2–7 with a 4.21 ERA, and 75 strikeouts in 57 2/3 innings. He averaged 11.7 strikeouts per 9 innings pitched, the 7th-highest mark ever by a Phillies reliever. He also pitched in Lehigh Valley, going 2–0 with a save and a 1.54 ERA, and 10 strikeouts in 11 2/3 innings.

Ramos recorded his first career save on May 13, 2018. In 2018 with the Phillies, he was 3–1 with a save and a 2.32 ERA, and 42 strikeouts in 42 2/3 innings. He held batters to a .191 batting average with runners on base. He also pitched 6 2/3 innings between Reading and Lehigh Valley.

In 2019 in the minor leagues he pitched for Clearwater, Reading, and Lehigh Valley, and was a combined 2–0 with six saves and a 3.21 ERA in 14 games (2 starts), during which he pitched 14 innings. In 2019 with the Phillies, he was 1–0 with a 5.40 ERA, as in 20 relief appearances he pitched 15 innings. Ramos was outrighted off of the Phillies roster on November 4, and subsequently elected free agency.

=== Wild Health Genomes ===
On January 9, 2020, Ramos signed a minor league contract with the Los Angeles Dodgers. Ramos did not play in a game in 2020 due to the cancellation of the minor league season because of the COVID-19 pandemic. He became a free agent on November 2.

On December 11, 2020, Ramos signed a minor league contract with the Texas Rangers organization. Ramos did not play in a game for the Rangers organization and became a free agent following the 2021 season.

On February 21, 2022, Ramos signed with the Wild Health Genomes of the Atlantic League of Professional Baseball. He made 16 appearances for the team, registering a 2-0 record and 5.71 ERA while striking out 15 in 17 1/3 innings of work.

=== Long Island Ducks ===
On July 17, 2022, Ramos was traded to the Long Island Ducks in the Atlantic League. In 16 games 14 2/3 innings of relief he struggled immensely going 0-2 with a 9.20 ERA and 13 strikeouts. He became a free agent following the season.

On November 19, 2022, while playing for the Tiburones de la Guaira in the Venezuelan Winter League, Ramos was involved in a brawl that started after Asdrúbal Cabrera punched Carlos Castro as he rounded the bases. In the ensuing brawl, Ramos threw a baseball full force into the middle of the fight. The ball struck Caribes de Anzoategui player Liarvis Breto in the head, causing a hematoma. The next day, Ramos was suspended indefinitely by the league.

=== Guerreros de Oaxaca ===
On January 11, 2023, Ramos signed with the Guerreros de Oaxaca of the Mexican League. In 3 appearances, Ramos posted a 1–0 record with a 10.80 ERA and 4 strikeouts over 3 1/3 innings. He was released on May 2.

=== Hagerstown Flying Boxcars ===
On March 6, 2024, Ramos signed with the Hagerstown Flying Boxcars of the Atlantic League of Professional Baseball. In 36 appearances for Hagerstown, he compiled a 4.67 ERA with 43 strikeouts across 34 2/3 innings pitched. Ramos retired from professional baseball on July 18.

== See also ==
- List of Major League Baseball players from Venezuela
