= Cameron Rupp =

American baseball player (born 1988)

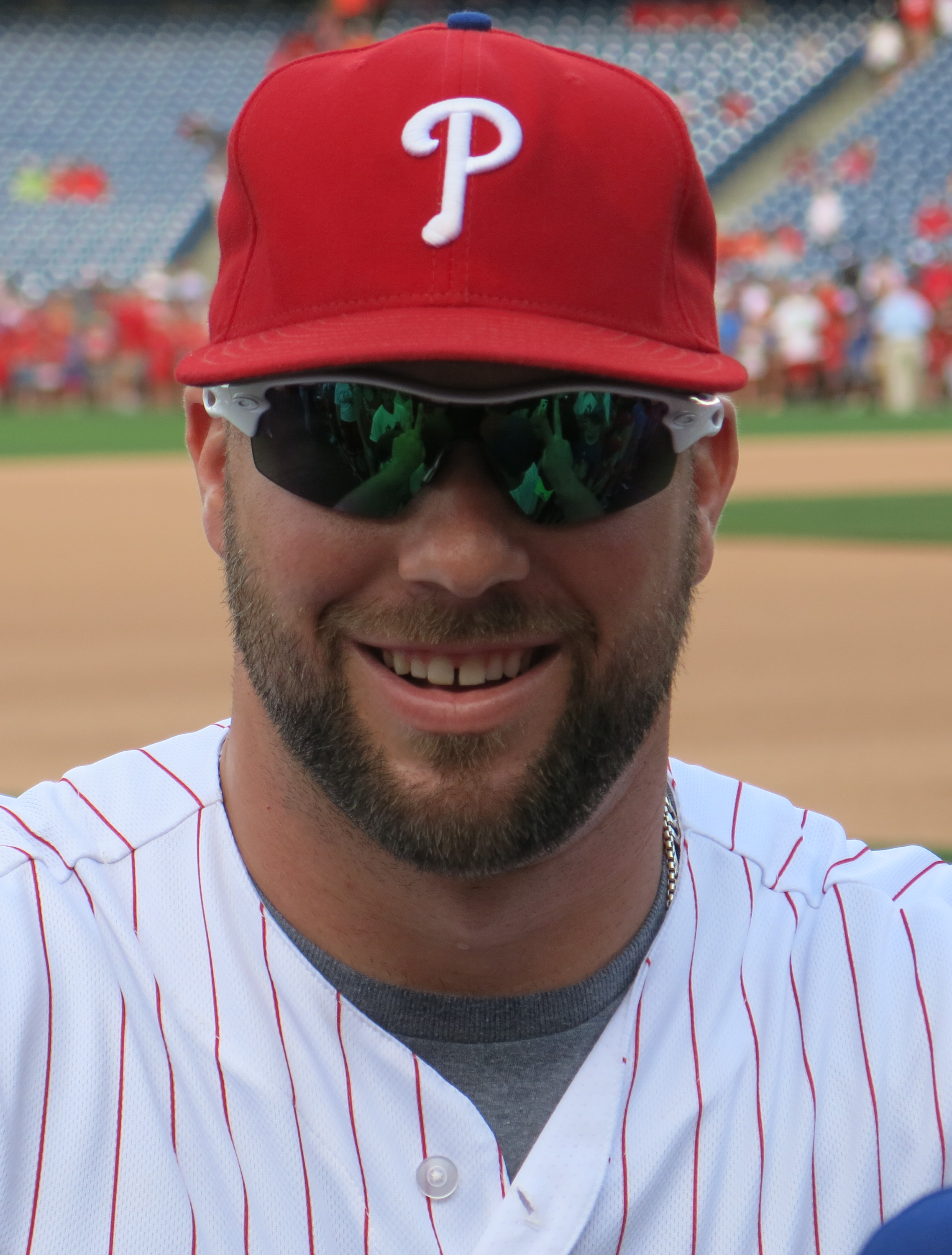
- Rupp with the Phillies in 2016
- Catcher
- Born: September 28, 1988 (age 38); Dallas, Texas, U.S.
- Batted: Right Threw: Right

MLB debut
- September 10, 2013, for the Philadelphia Phillies

Last MLB appearance
- September 30, 2017, for the Philadelphia Phillies

MLB statistics
- Batting average: .234
- Home runs: 39
- Runs batted in: 124
- Stats at Baseball Reference

Teams
- Philadelphia Phillies (2013–2017)

Cameron Arthur Rupp (born September 28, 1988) is an American former professional baseball catcher. He played in Major League Baseball (MLB) for the Philadelphia Phillies from 2013 to 2017.

== Career ==
=== Amateur career ===
Rupp attended Prestonwood Christian Academy in Plano, Texas. The Pittsburgh Pirates selected Rupp in the 43rd round of the 2007 Major League Baseball draft, but he did not sign with the Pirates.

Rupp enrolled at the University of Texas at Austin and played college baseball for the Texas Longhorns. In 54 games as a freshman, he batted .309 with four home runs and 32 runs batted in (RBIs) and had a .990 fielding percentage. He was named a Freshman All-American by the National Collegiate Baseball Writers Association and Louisville Slugger. That summer, he played collegiate summer baseball for the Santa Barbara Foresters of the California Collegiate League. In 63 games as a sophomore, he hit .292 with a team-high 11 home runs and 46 RBIs during their College World Series runner-up season and was named to the All-College World Series team. That summer he played for the Cotuit Kettleers of the Cape Cod Baseball League and was named a league all-star. In 63 games as a junior, Rupp hit .304 with 10 home run and 54 RBIs.

=== Professional career ===
==== Philadelphia Phillies ====
The Philadelphia Phillies selected Rupp in the third round of the 2010 Major League Baseball draft. Rupp signed with the Phillies and was assigned to the Williamsport Crosscutters of the Low-A New York-Penn League. In 55 games, he hit .218 with five home runs and 28 RBIs. Rupp played for the Lakewood BlueClaws of the Single-A South Atlantic League in 2011. In 99 games, he hit .272 with four home runs and 44 RBIs, and struck out 96 times.

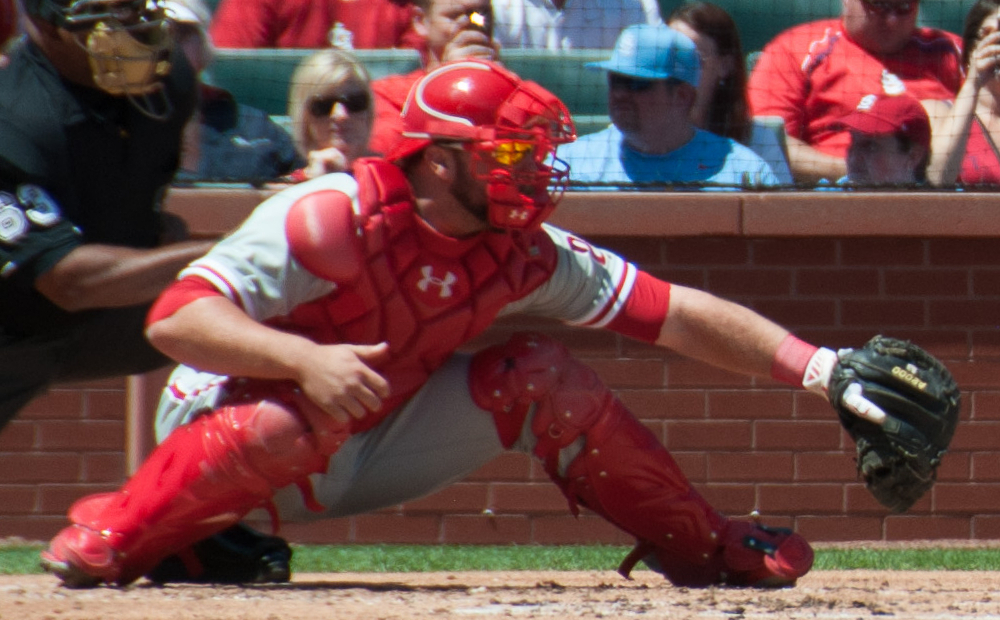
Rupp catching for the Phillies in 2015

Rupp played the 2012 season with the Clearwater Threshers of the High-A Florida State League, where in 104 games, he hit .267 with 10 home runs and 49 RBIs. Rupp began the 2013 season with the Reading Fightin Phils of the Double-A Eastern League, where in 41 games, he hit .245 with eight home runs and 21 RBIs before being promoted to the Lehigh Valley IronPigs of the Triple-A International League in early June. In 53 games for the IronPigs, he hit .269 with six home runs and 24 RBIs.

On September 3, Rupp was promoted to the major leagues by the Phillies. In his first start, he recorded his first hit, off of Andrew Cashner, and later scored his first run. He started three games at catcher, and made one appearance as a pinch hitter. He hit 4-for-13 (.308) with two RBIs. After the season, he played for the Peoria Javelinas of the Arizona Fall League.

Rupp began the 2015 season as the Phillies' backup catcher, but by the end of June, with primary catcher Carlos Ruiz struggling and Rupp's performance starting to improve, Rupp began to see increased playing time. On June 23, 2015, Rupp hit his first major league home run off New York Yankees pitcher CC Sabathia. When Ruiz was traded in 2016, Rupp officially became the Phillies starting catcher. He batted .217 in 2017, his only full season as starting catcher.

In January 2018, the Phillies and Rupp avoided salary arbitration by agreeing to a salary of $2.08 million for the 2018 season. Rupp was released by the Phillies on March 26, 2018.

==== Texas Rangers ====
On April 3, 2018, Rupp signed a minor-league contract with the Texas Rangers. On June 1, he exercised the opt-out clause in his contract and was granted his release.

==== Minnesota Twins ====
On June 4, 2018, Rupp signed a minor-league deal with the Minnesota Twins. Rupp was released on July 11, 2018.

==== Seattle Mariners ====
On July 16, 2018, Rupp signed a minor league contract with the Seattle Mariners. He played in 33 games for the Triple-A Tacoma Rainiers, hitting .218/.328/.391 with four home runs and 12 RBI. Rupp elected free agency following the season on November 2.

==== San Francisco Giants ====
On December 7, 2018, Rupp signed a minor-league deal with the San Francisco Giants that included an invitation to spring training.

==== Detroit Tigers ====
On March 8, 2019, Rupp was traded to the Detroit Tigers in exchange for cash considerations. He was released on May 13, 2019.

==== Oakland Athletics ====
On May 18, 2019, Rupp signed a minor league contract with the Oakland Athletics organization. In 38 games for the Triple-A Las Vegas Aviators, he batted .209/.324/.487 with nine home runs and 17 RBI. Rupp elected free agency following the season on November 4.

==== Cleveland Indians ====
On February 7, 2020, Rupp signed a minor league deal with the Cleveland Indians with an invitation to major league spring training. In July, Rupp signed on to play for Team Texas of the Constellation Energy League (a makeshift 4-team independent league created as a result of the COVID-19 pandemic) for the 2020 season. Rupp was added to the Indians' player pool for the 2020 season in August. He became a free agent on November 2.
