= Andrés Blanco =

Venezuelan baseball player (born 1984)

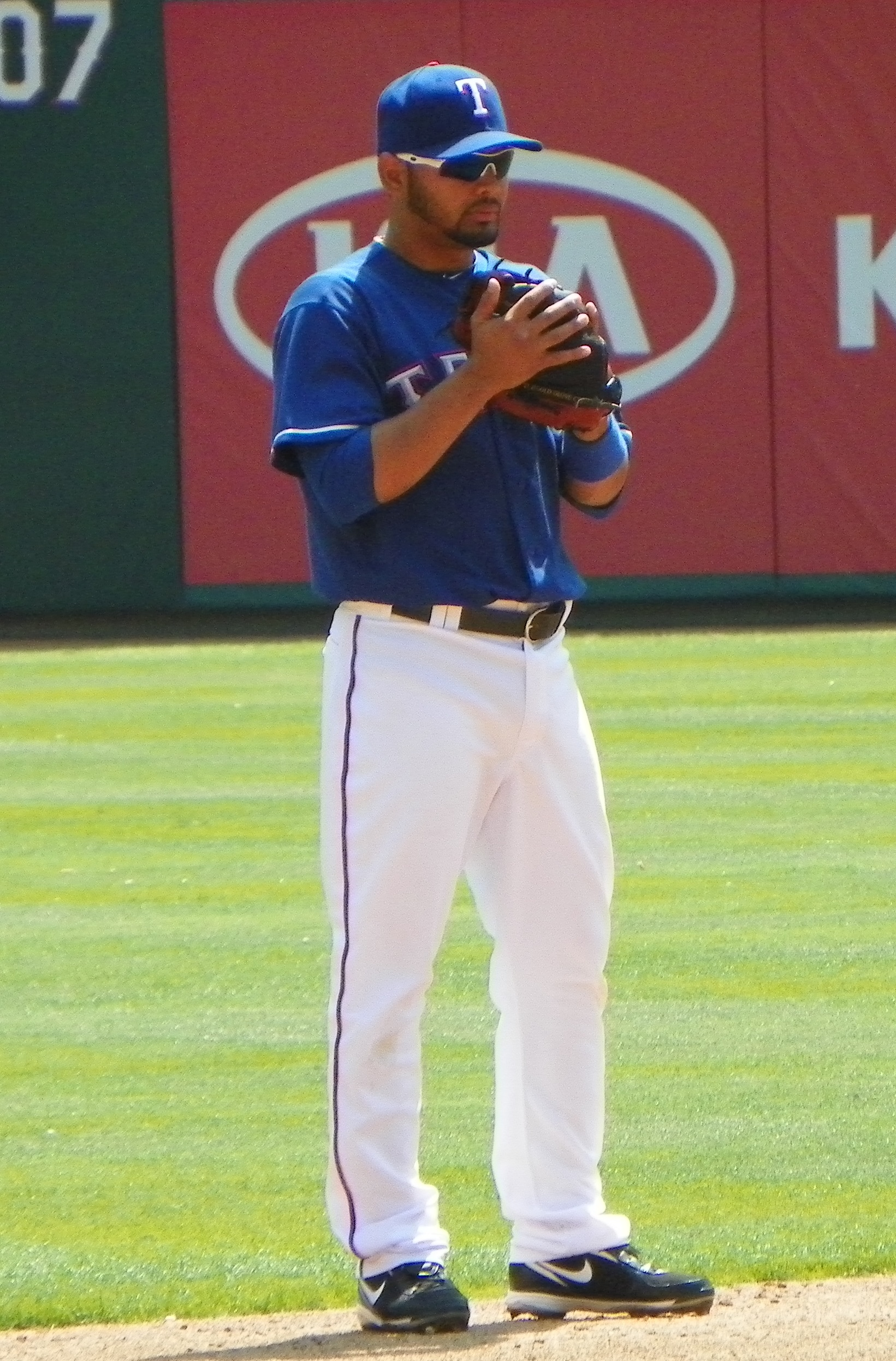
- Blanco with the Texas Rangers in 2011
- Infielder
- Born: April 11, 1984 (age 41); Caracas, Venezuela
- Batted: Switch Threw: Right

MLB debut
- April 17, 2004, for the Kansas City Royals

Last MLB appearance
- September 12, 2017, for the Philadelphia Phillies

MLB statistics
- Batting average: .256
- Home runs: 18
- Runs batted in: 109
- Stats at Baseball Reference

Teams
- Kansas City Royals (2004–2006); Chicago Cubs (2009); Texas Rangers (2010–2011); Philadelphia Phillies (2014–2017)

Andrés Eloy Blanco Perez (born April 11, 1984) is a Venezuelan former professional baseball infielder. He played in Major League Baseball (MLB) for the Kansas City Royals, Chicago Cubs, Texas Rangers, and Philadelphia Phillies.

== Baseball career ==
=== Kansas City Royals ===
Blanco made his major league debut with the Kansas City Royals on April 18, 2004. He hit .317 (19-for-60) with five RBI, nine runs, two doubles, two triples, and one stolen base in 19 games.

He hit .215 with a .220 on-base percentage in 2005, and .241 with a .290 on-base percentage in 2006, both with Kansas City. Blanco had surgery on September 29, 2006, to repair a posterior labrum tear in his left shoulder, which he injured during a swing five days prior against the Tigers.

He did not play in the major leagues in 2007, but batted .192 in the minor leagues with a .226 on-base percentage and a .212 slugging percentage.

=== Chicago Cubs ===
Blanco signed a minor league contract with the Chicago Cubs in November 2007, played the 2008 season with the Iowa Cubs where he hit .285/.327/.336, and became a free agent at the end of the season. In December 2008, he re-signed with the Cubs.

On June 20, 2009, during an interleague game between the Cubs and Cleveland Indians, Blanco hit an RBI single to tie a game in extra innings. He later scored the winning run for the Cubs on a wild pitch thrown by Indians' closer Kerry Wood.

Blanco hit his first major league home run on July 29, 2009 while playing the Houston Astros at Wrigley Field.

=== Texas Rangers ===
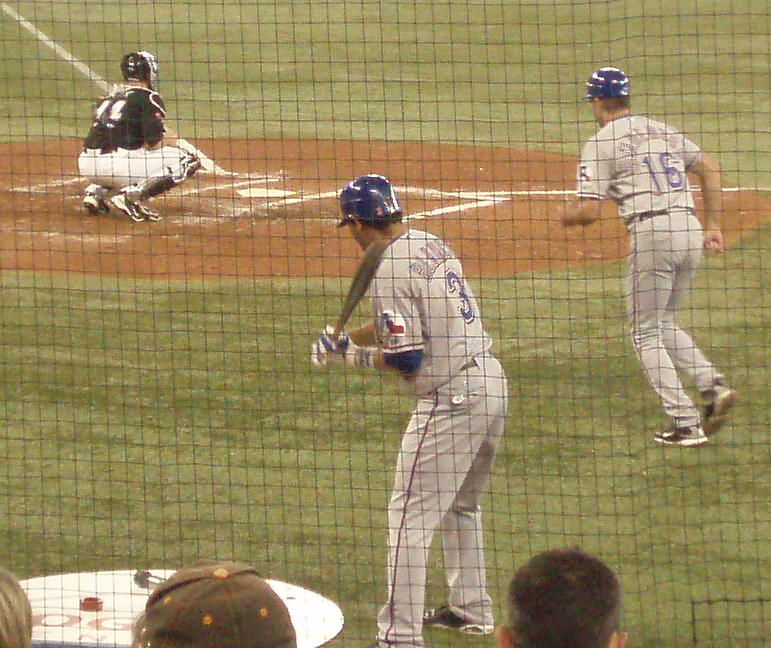
Blanco with the Texas Rangers in September 2010

On March 27, 2010, Blanco was traded to the Texas Rangers in exchange for a player to be named later or cash considerations. He subsequently won the Rangers' utility infielder position. In 2011, Blanco batted .224/.263/.342 for Texas. On November 2, 2011, Blanco was removed from the 40-man roster and sent outright to the Triple-A Oklahoma City RedHawks. He became a free agent two days later.

=== Washington Nationals ===
Blanco signed a minor league contract with the Washington Nationals on December 16, 2011. He also received an invitation to spring training.

=== Philadelphia Phillies ===
On March 31, 2012, Blanco signed a minor league contract with the Philadelphia Phillies organization. Playing for the Triple–A Lehigh Valley IronPigs in 2012, he batted .235/.301/.346 with 10 home runs and 40 RBI. He had right shoulder surgery in February 2013, and missed playing the entire 2013 season.

The Phillies re-signed Blanco to a minor league contract that included a spring training invitation on November 21, 2013. On June 29, 2014, Blanco was selected to the 40-man roster and promoted to the major leagues for the first time.

On December 14, 2016, Blanco signed a one-year, $3 million contract with the Phillies. On June 7, 2017, Blanco pitched 1/3 of an inning in a blowout loss to the Atlanta Braves, giving up a two-run home run for an ERA of 27.00.

=== Milwaukee Brewers ===
On January 30, 2018, Blanco signed a minor league contract with the San Francisco Giants. He was released by the Giants organization prior to the start of the season on March 23.

On April 2, 2018, Blanco signed a minor league contract with the Milwaukee Brewers. In 96 games for the Triple–A Colorado Springs Sky Sox, he batted .271/.362/.435 with 9 home runs and 47 RBI. Blanco elected free agency following the season on November 2.

=== Atlanta Braves ===
On December 7, 2018, Blanco signed a minor league contract with the Atlanta Braves that included an invitation to spring training. He spent the 2019 campaign with the Triple–A Gwinnett Stripers, playing in 118 games and hitting .262/.364/.443 with 19 home runs and 61 RBI. Blanco elected free agency following the season on November 4, 2019.

=== Milwaukee Brewers (second stint) ===
On January 31, 2020, Blanco signed a minor league deal with the Milwaukee Brewers. He did not play in a game in 2020 due to the cancellation of the minor league season because of the COVID-19 pandemic. Blanco was released by the Brewers organization on May 28.

== See also ==
- List of Major League Baseball players from Venezuela
