= 2015 Philadelphia Phillies season =

2015 Philadelphia Phillies
- League: National League
- Division: East
- Ballpark: Citizens Bank Park
- City: Philadelphia, Pennsylvania
- Record: 63–99 (.389)
- Divisional place: 5th
- Owners: Bill Giles; David Montgomery
- General managers: Rubén Amaro, Jr. (dismissed September 10); Scott Proefrock (interim)
- Managers: Pete Mackanin (interim, beginning June 26); Ryne Sandberg (resigned June 26)
- Television: Comcast SportsNet Philadelphia; Comcast Network Philadelphia; NBC Philadelphia (Tom McCarthy, Ben Davis, Matt Stairs, Mike Schmidt, Gregg Murphy)
- Radio: Phillies Radio Network; WPHT 1210 AM & WIP 94.1 FM (English) (Scott Franzke, Larry Andersen, Jim Jackson); WTTM (Spanish) (Danny Martinez, Bill Kulik, Rickie Ricardo)
- Stats: ESPN.com; Baseball Reference

The 2015 Philadelphia Phillies season was the 133rd season in the history of the franchise, and its twelfth season at Citizens Bank Park. The team finished the season with a record of 63–99 (.389), the worst record in the majors, and missed the playoffs for a fourth consecutive season.

== Offseason ==
Players becoming free agents:

- A. J. Burnett – Signed with the Pittsburgh Pirates for one year. – 11/14/14
- Kyle Kendrick – Signed with the Colorado Rockies for one year. – 2/4/15
- Mike Adams – Signed a minor league contract with the Los Angeles Dodgers. – 3/1/15
- Wil Nieves – Signed a minor league deal with the San Diego Padres. – 2/4/15

Trades and signings:

- October 21, 2014 – Re-signed pitcher Jerome Williams to a one-year deal.
- October 23, 2014 – Re-signed Grady Sizemore to a one-year deal.
- December 10, 2014 – Traded Antonio Bastardo to the Pittsburgh Pirates for Joely Rodriguez.
- December 19, 2014 – Traded Jimmy Rollins and cash to the Los Angeles Dodgers for minor leaguers Tom Windle and Zach Eflin.
- December 31, 2014 – Traded Marlon Byrd and cash to the Cincinnati Reds for RHP Ben Lively.
- January 5, 2015 – Signed Aaron Harang to a one-year deal worth $5 million, that included performance bonuses.
- January 29, 2015 – Signed Chad Billingsley to a one-year deal.

=== Broadcasting changes ===
After only one season, Jamie Moyer departed the Phillies' broadcast booth. Comcast SportsNet hired Ben Davis, previously a pre-game and post-game analyst, to replace Moyer as a game analyst, working with Matt Stairs (another analyst), Tom McCarthy (play-by-play), Gregg Murphy (field reporter), and Mike Schmidt (analyst for weekend home games).

== Season standings ==
=== National League East ===
NL East
Team	W	L	Pct.	GB	Home	Road
New York Mets	90	72	.556	—	49‍–‍32	41‍–‍40
Washington Nationals	83	79	.512	7	46‍–‍35	37‍–‍44
Miami Marlins	71	91	.438	19	41‍–‍40	30‍–‍51
Atlanta Braves	67	95	.414	23	42‍–‍39	25‍–‍56
Philadelphia Phillies	63	99	.389	27	37‍–‍44	26‍–‍55

=== National League Wild Card ===
Division leaders
Team	W	L	Pct.
St. Louis Cardinals	100	62	.617
Los Angeles Dodgers	92	70	.568
New York Mets	90	72	.556

Wild Card teams (Top 2 teams qualify for postseason)
Team	W	L	Pct.	GB
Pittsburgh Pirates	98	64	.605	+1
Chicago Cubs	97	65	.599	—
San Francisco Giants	84	78	.519	13
Washington Nationals	83	79	.512	14
Arizona Diamondbacks	79	83	.488	18
San Diego Padres	74	88	.457	23
Miami Marlins	71	91	.438	26
Milwaukee Brewers	68	94	.420	29
Colorado Rockies	68	94	.420	29
Atlanta Braves	67	95	.414	30
Cincinnati Reds	64	98	.395	33
Philadelphia Phillies	63	99	.389	34

=== Record vs. opponents ===
2015 National League record Source: MLB Standings Grid – 2015
Team	AZ	ATL	CHC	CIN	COL	LAD	MIA	MIL	NYM	PHI	PIT	SD	SF	STL	WSH	AL
Arizona	—	3–3	2–4	6–1	13–6	6–13	5–2	5–2	2–5	2–4	1–5	9–10	11–8	0–7	3–4	11–9
Atlanta	3–3	—	1–6	3–4	1–6	3–3	10–9	5–2	8–11	11–8	2–4	2–5	3–4	4–2	5–14	6–14
Chicago	4–2	6–1	—	13–6	4–2	3–4	3–3	14–5	7–0	2–5	11–8	3–3	5–2	8–11	4–3	10–10
Cincinnati	1–6	4–3	6–13	—	2–4	1–6	3–4	9–10	0–7	4–2	11–8	2–4	2–5	7–12	5–1	7–13
Colorado	6–13	6–1	2–4	4–2	—	8–11	2–5	5–1	0–7	5–2	1–6	7–12	11–8	3–4	3–3	5–15
Los Angeles	13–6	3–3	4–3	6–1	11–8	—	4–2	4–3	3–4	5–2	1–5	14–5	8–11	2–5	4–2	10–10
Miami	2–5	9–10	3–3	4–3	5–2	2–4	—	4–2	8–11	9–10	1–6	2–5	5–2	1–5	9–10	7–13
Milwaukee	2–5	2–5	5–14	10–9	1–5	3–4	2–4	—	3–3	7–0	10–9	5–2	1–5	6–13	3–4	8–12
New York	5–2	11–8	0–7	7–0	7–0	4–3	11–8	3–3	—	14–5	0–6	2–4	3–3	3–4	11–8	9–11
Philadelphia	4–2	8–11	5–2	2–4	2–5	2–5	10–9	0–7	5–14	—	2–5	5–1	1–5	2–5	7–12	8–12
Pittsburgh	5–1	4–2	8–11	8–11	6–1	5–1	6–1	9–10	6–0	5–2	—	5–2	6–1	9–10	3–4	13–7
San Diego	10–9	5–2	3–3	4–2	12–7	5–14	5–2	2–5	4–2	1–5	2–5	—	8–11	4–3	2–5	7–13
San Francisco	8–11	4–3	2–5	5–2	8–11	11–8	2–5	5–1	3–3	5–1	1–6	11–8	—	2–4	4–3	13–7
St. Louis	7–0	2–4	11–8	12–7	4–3	5–2	5–1	13–6	4–3	5–2	10–9	3–4	4–2	—	4–2	11–9
Washington	4–3	14–5	3–4	1–5	3–3	2–4	10–9	4–3	8–11	12–7	4–3	5–2	3–4	2–4	—	8–12

=== Game log ===
Legend
	Phillies win
	Phillies loss
	Postponement
**Bold**	Phillies team member

2015 Game Log
Overall Record: 63–99
April (8–15)

#	Date	Opponent	Score	Win	Loss	Save	Attendance	Record
1	April 6	Red Sox	0–8	Clay Buchholz (1–0)	**Cole Hamels** (0–1)	—	45,549	0–1
2	April 8	Red Sox	4–2	**Aaron Harang** (1–0)	Rick Porcello (0–1)	**Jonathan Papelbon** (1)	26,465	1–1
3	April 9	Red Sox	2–6	Justin Masterson (1–0)	**David Buchanan** (0–1)	—	23,418	1–2
4	April 10	Nationals	4–1	**Luis García** (1–0)	Gio González (0–1)	**Jonathan Papelbon** (2)	19,047	2–2
5	April 11	Nationals	3–2 (10)	**Dustin McGowan** (1–0)	Tanner Roark (0–1)	—	23,740	3–2
6	April 12	Nationals	3–4 (10)	Aaron Barrett (1–0)	**Jake Diekman** (0–1)	Drew Storen (2)	30,094	3–3
7	April 13	@ Mets	0–2	Jacob deGrom (1–1)	**Aaron Harang** (1–1)	Jeurys Familia (2)	43,947	3–4
8	April 14	@ Mets	5–6	Matt Harvey (2–0)	**David Buchanan** (0–2)	Jeurys Familia (3)	38,849	3–5
9	April 15	@ Mets	1–6	Jon Niese (1–0)	**Jerome Williams** (0–1)	—	21,052	3–6
10	April 16	@ Nationals	2–5	Doug Fister (1–0)	**Cole Hamels** (0–2)	Drew Storen (3)	24,768	3–7
11	April 17	@ Nationals	2–7	Max Scherzer (1–1)	**Sean O'Sullivan** (0–1)	—	31,608	3–8
12	April 18	@ Nationals	5–3	**Aaron Harang** (2–1)	Jordan Zimmermann (1–2)	**Jonathan Papelbon** (3)	35,330	4–8
13	April 19	@ Nationals	1–4	Stephen Strasburg (1–1)	**David Buchanan** (0–3)	Drew Storen (4)	36,631	4–9
14	April 21	Marlins	7–3	**Jerome Williams** (1–1)	Dan Haren (1–1)	—	21,993	5–9
15	April 22	Marlins	1–6	Jarred Cosart (1–1)	**Luis García** (1–1)	—	23,417	5–10
16	April 23	Marlins	1–9	David Phelps (1–0)	**Dustin McGowan** (1–1)	—	17,097	5–11
17	April 24	Braves	1–0	**Ken Giles** (1–0)	Jim Johnson (1–2)	—	21,164	6–11
18	April 25	Braves	2–5	Shelby Miller (3–0)	**David Buchanan** (0–4)	Jason Grilli (7)	24,748	6–12
19	April 26	Braves	5–4	**Jerome Williams** (2–1)	Trevor Cahill (0–3)	**Jonathan Papelbon** (4)	28,702	7–12
20	April 27	@ Cardinals	4–1	**Cole Hamels** (1–2)	John Lackey (1–1)	**Jonathan Papelbon** (5)	40,052	8–12
21	April 28	@ Cardinals	5–11	Michael Wacha (4–0)	**Severino González** (0–1)	—	40,143	8–13
22	April 29	@ Cardinals	2–5	Carlos Martínez (3–0)	**Aaron Harang** (2–2)	Trevor Rosenthal (8)	40,399	8–14
23	April 30	@ Cardinals	3–9	Carlos Villanueva (2–1)	**David Buchanan** (0–5)	—	40,715	8–15

May (11–18)

#	Date	Opponent	Score	Win	Loss	Save	Attendance	Record
24	May 1	@ Marlins	3–4	Steve Cishek (1–1)	**Ken Giles** (1–1)	—	18,511	8–16
25	May 2	@ Marlins	0–7	Dan Haren (3–1)	**Cole Hamels** (1–3)	—	33,348	8–17
26	May 3	@ Marlins	6–2	**Severino González** (1–1)	Jarred Cosart (1–2)	—	20,461	9–17
27	May 4	@ Braves	5–2	**Aaron Harang** (3–2)	Alex Wood (1–2)	—	17,293	10–17
28	May 5	@ Braves	0–9	Shelby Miller (4–1)	**Chad Billingsley** (0–1)	—	14,451	10–18
29	May 6	@ Braves	5–7	Mike Foltynewicz (2–0)	**Jerome Williams** (2–2)	Jason Grilli (9)	17,772	10–19
30	May 8	Mets	3–1	**Cole Hamels** (2–3)	Matt Harvey (5–1)	**Jonathan Papelbon** (6)	32,734	11–19
31	May 9	Mets	2–3	Jon Niese (3–2)	**Aaron Harang** (3–3)	Jeurys Familia (12)	29,373	11–20
32	May 10	Mets	4–7	Bartolo Colón (6–1)	**Chad Billingsley** (0–2)	Jeurys Familia (13)	27,935	11–21
33	May 11	Pirates	3–4	Gerrit Cole (5–1)	**Jerome Williams** (2–3)	Mark Melancon (8)	21,358	11–22
34	May 12	Pirates	2–7	A. J. Burnett (2–1)	**Sean O'Sullivan** (0–2)	—	20,393	11–23
35	May 13	Pirates	3–2	**Cole Hamels** (3–3)	Francisco Liriano (1–3)	**Jonathan Papelbon** (7)	29,576	12–23
36	May 14	Pirates	4–2	**Aaron Harang** (4–3)	Vance Worley (2–3)	**Jonathan Papelbon** (8)	29,205	13–23
37	May 15	Diamondbacks	4–3	**Elvis Araújo** (1–0)	Óliver Pérez (1–1)	**Luis García** (1)	21,383	14–23
38	May 16	Diamondbacks	7–5	**Jerome Williams** (3–3)	Archie Bradley (2–1)	**Jonathan Papelbon** (9)	33,649	15–23
39	May 17	Diamondbacks	6–0	**Sean O'Sullivan** (1–2)	Josh Collmenter (3–5)	—	22,123	16–23
40	May 18	@ Rockies	4–3	**Cole Hamels** (4–3)	Jordan Lyles (2–4)	**Jonathan Papelbon** (10)	24,061	17–23
41	May 19	@ Rockies	5–6	Scott Oberg (2–1)	**Justin De Fratus** (0–1)	John Axford (5)	21,249	17–24
42	May 20	@ Rockies	4–2	**Severino González** (2–1)	Eddie Butler (2–5)	**Jonathan Papelbon** (11)	21,714	18–24
43	May 21	@ Rockies	3–7	Christian Bergman (2–0)	**Jerome Williams** (3–4)	—	25,418	18–25
44	May 22	@ Nationals	1–2	Max Scherzer (5–3)	**Sean O'Sullivan** (1–3)	Drew Storen (13)	35,893	18–26
45	May 23	@ Nationals	8–1	**Cole Hamels** (5–3)	Stephen Strasburg (3–6)	—	41,722	19–26
46	May 24	@ Nationals	1–4	Gio González (4–2)	**Aaron Harang** (4–4)	Drew Storen (14)	41,044	19–27
47	May 25	@ Mets	3–6	Bartolo Colón (7–3)	**Elvis Araújo** (1–1)	Jeurys Familia (14)	30,946	19–28
48	May 26	@ Mets	4–5 (10)	Jeurys Familia (1–0)	**Jeanmar Gómez** (0–1)	—	21,064	19–29
49	May 27	@ Mets	0–7	Noah Syndergaard (2–2)	**Sean O'Sullivan** (1–4)	—	24,406	19–30
50	May 29	Rockies	1–4	Chad Bettis (2–0)	**Cole Hamels** (5–4)	—	22,227	19–31
51	May 30	Rockies	2–5	Eddie Butler (3–5)	**Aaron Harang** (4–5)	John Axford (9)	23,510	19–32
52	May 31	Rockies	1–4	Chris Rusin (1–0)	**Jerome Williams** (3–5)	Scott Oberg (1)	22,166	19–33

June (8–19)

#	Date	Opponent	Score	Win	Loss	Save	Attendance	Record
53	June 2	Reds	5–4	**Jonathan Papelbon** (1–0)	Tony Cingrani (0–2)	—	20,209	20–33
54	June 3	Reds	5–4 (11)	**Luis García** (2–1)	Ryan Mattheus (0–1)	—	21,253	21–33
55	June 4	Reds	4–6	Anthony DeSclafani (4–4)	**Aaron Harang** (4–6)	Aroldis Chapman (10)	21,057	21–34
56	June 5	Giants	4–5	Tim Lincecum (6–3)	**Luis García** (2–2)	Santiago Casilla (16)	20,638	21–35
57	June 6	Giants	5–7	Madison Bumgarner (7–2)	**Severino González** (2–2)	Santiago Casilla (15)	29,102	21–36
58	June 7	Giants	6–4	**Ken Giles** (2–1)	Ryan Vogelsong (4–4)	**Jonathan Papelbon** (12)	24,799	22–36
59	June 8	@ Reds	4–6	Mike Leake (3–4)	**Cole Hamels** (5–5)	Aroldis Chapman (11)	30,900	22–37
60	June 9	@ Reds	2–11	Anthony DeSclafani (5–4)	**Aaron Harang** (4–7)	—	27,993	22–38
61	June 10	@ Reds	2–5	Jon Moscot (1–1)	**Jerome Williams** (3–6)	Aroldis Chapman (12)	32,994	22–39
62	June 12	@ Pirates	0–1 (13)	Antonio Bastardo (1–1)	**Dustin McGowan** (1–2)	—	33,749	22–40
63	June 13	@ Pirates	3–4	Gerrit Cole (10–2)	**Sean O'Sullivan** (1–5)	Mark Melancon (20)	37,516	22–41
64	June 14	@ Pirates	0–1 (11)	Antonio Bastardo (2–1)	**Jonathan Papelbon** (1–1)	—	34,518	22–42
65	June 15	@ Orioles	0–4	Wei-Yin Chen (3–4)	**Aaron Harang** (4–8)	—	23,730	22–43
66	June 16	@ Orioles	3–19	Chris Tillman (5–7)	**Jerome Williams** (3–7)	—	26,964	22–44
67	June 17	Orioles	4–6	Ubaldo Jiménez (5–3)	**Kevin Correia** (0–1)	Zach Britton (18)	26,162	22–45
68	June 18	Orioles	2–1	**Jake Diekman** (1–1)	Bud Norris (2–5)	**Jonathan Papelbon** (13)	26,220	23–45
69	June 19	Cardinals	4–12	Tyler Lyons (2–0)	**Phillippe Aumont** (0–1)	—	21,169	23–46
70	June 20	Cardinals	1–10	John Lackey (6–4)	**Aaron Harang** (4–9)	—	24,256	23–47
71	June 21	Cardinals	9–2	**Adam Morgan** (1–0)	Michael Wacha (9–3)	—	30,423	24–47
72	June 22	@ Yankees	11–8	**Jake Diekman** (2–1)	Michael Pineda (8–4)	—	36,883	25–47
73	June 23	@ Yankees	11–6	**Ken Giles** (3–1)	Dellin Betances (4–1)	—	36,198	26–47
74	June 24	@ Yankees	2–10	Iván Nova (1–0)	**Cole Hamels** (5–6)	—	45,877	26–48
75	June 26	Nationals	2–5	Max Scherzer (9–5)	**Aaron Harang** (4–10)	Drew Storen (22)	22,292	26–49
–	June 27	Nationals	Postponed (rain) (Note: The game on June 27, 2015, began but was called after 1 1/2 innings with the score tied 0–0.) Rescheduled for June 28 as part of a doubleheader					
76	June 28 (1)	Nationals	2–3	Stephen Strasburg (5–5)	**Kevin Correia** (0–2)	Drew Storen (23)	see 2nd game	26–50
77	June 28 (2)	Nationals	8–5	**Severino González** (3–2)	Tanner Roark (3–3)	**Jonathan Papelbon** (14)	27,126	27–50
78	June 29	Brewers	4–7	Jimmy Nelson (5–8)	**Sean O'Sullivan** (1–6)	Francisco Rodríguez (16)	18,423	27–51
79	June 30	Brewers	3–4	Neal Cotts (1–0)	**Ken Giles** (3–2)	Francisco Rodríguez (17)	20,564	27–52

July (13–12)

#	Date	Opponent	Score	Win	Loss	Save	Attendance	Record
80	July 1	Brewers	5–9	Kyle Lohse (5–9)	**Aaron Harang** (4–11)	—	27,069	27–53
81	July 2	Brewers	7–8 (11)	Michael Blazek (5–2)	**Luis García** (2–3)	Francisco Rodríguez (18)	30,485	27–54
82	July 3	@ Braves	1–2	Julio Teherán (6–4)	**Adam Morgan** (1–1)	Jim Johnson (5)	33,090	27–55
83	July 4	@ Braves	5–9	Alex Wood (6–5)	**Kevin Correia** (0–3)	—	34,401	27–56
84	July 5	@ Braves	4–0 (10)	**Luis García** (3–3)	Nick Masset (2–2)	—	18,763	28–56
85	July 6	@ Dodgers	7–10	J. P. Howell (4–1)	**Jeanmar Gómez** (0–2)	Kenley Jansen (14)	45,180	28–57
86	July 7	@ Dodgers	7–2	**Chad Billingsley** (1–2)	Brett Anderson (5–5)	—	46,614	29–57
87	July 8	@ Dodgers	0–5	Clayton Kershaw (6–6)	**Adam Morgan** (1–2)	—	45,135	29–58
88	July 9	@ Dodgers	0–6	Zack Greinke (8–2)	**Severino González** (3–3)	—	41,290	29–59
89	July 10	@ Giants	2–15	Madison Bumgarner (9–5)	**Cole Hamels** (5–7)	—	41,895	29–60
90	July 11	@ Giants	5–8	Josh Osich (1–0)	**Luis García** (3–4)	Santiago Casilla (22)	41,980	29–61
91	July 12	@ Giants	2–4	Chris Heston (9–5)	**Chad Billingsley** (1–3)	Santiago Casilla (23)	42,387	29–62
–	July 14	**2015 Major League Baseball All-Star Game at Great American Ball Park in Cincinnati**						
92	July 17	Marlins	6–3	**Ken Giles** (4–2)	Bryan Morris (3–2)	—	23,074	30–62
93	July 18	Marlins	3–1	**Chad Billingsley** (2–3)	Tom Koehler (7–6)	**Jonathan Papelbon** (15)	23,655	31–62
94	July 19	Marlins	8–7	**Héctor Neris** (1–0)	A. J. Ramos (0–2)	—	21,739	32–62
95	July 20	Rays	5–3	**David Buchanan** (1–5)	Matt Moore (1–1)	**Jonathan Papelbon** (16)	20,148	33–62
96	July 21	Rays	0–1	Nathan Karns (5–5)	**Aaron Nola** (0–1)	Brad Boxberger (24)	28,703	33–63
97	July 22	Rays	5–4 (10)	**Jonathan Papelbon** (2–1)	Brad Boxberger (4–6)	—	22,252	34–63
98	July 24	@ Cubs	5–3 (10)	**Ken Giles** (5–2)	James Russell (0–2)	**Jonathan Papelbon** (17)	41,230	35–63
99	July 25	@ Cubs	5–0	**Cole Hamels** (6–7)	Jake Arrieta (11–6)	—	41,683	36–63
100	July 26	@ Cubs	11–5	**Aaron Nola** (1–1)	Jason Hammel (5–5)	—	41,123	37–63
101	July 28	@ Blue Jays	3–2	**Adam Morgan** (2–2)	Félix Doubront (1–1)	**Ken Giles** (1)	30,516	38–63
102	July 29	@ Blue Jays	2–8	R. A. Dickey (5–10)	**Jerome Williams** (3–8)	—	27,060	38–64
103	July 30	Braves	4–1	**Aaron Harang** (5–11)	Shelby Miller (5–8)	**Ken Giles** (2)	21,706	39–64
104	July 31	Braves	9–3	**David Buchanan** (2–5)	Williams Pérez (4–1)	—	29,290	40–64

August (12–16)

#	Date	Opponent	Score	Win	Loss	Save	Attendance	Record
105	August 1	Braves	12–2	**Aaron Nola** (2–1)	Matt Wisler (5–2)	—	25,523	41–64
106	August 2	Braves	2–6	Julio Teherán (7–6)	**Adam Morgan** (2–3)	—	24,361	41–65
107	August 4	Dodgers	6–2	**Jeanmar Gómez** (1–2)	Alex Wood (7–7)	**Ken Giles** (3)	28,733	42–65
108	August 5	Dodgers	3–4	Brett Anderson (6–6)	**Aaron Harang** (5–12)	Kenley Jansen (20)	26,197	42–66
109	August 6	Dodgers	8–10	Zack Greinke (11–2)	**David Buchanan** (2–6)	Kenley Jansen (21)	27,839	42–67
110	August 7	@ Padres	4–3 (12)	**Héctor Neris** (2–0)	Kevin Quackenbush (1–2)	**Ken Giles** (4)	31,334	43–67
111	August 8	@ Padres	4–2	**Adam Morgan** (3–3)	Tyson Ross (8–9)	**Ken Giles** (5)	44,567	44–67
112	August 9	@ Padres	5–3	**Jerome Williams** (4–8)	Andrew Cashner (4–12)	**Ken Giles** (6)	24,156	45–67
113	August 10	@ Diamondbacks	3–13	Rubby De La Rosa (10–5)	**Aaron Harang** (5–13)	—	16,495	45–68
114	August 11	@ Diamondbacks	1–13	Jeremy Hellickson (8–8)	**David Buchanan** (2–7)	—	19,836	45–69
115	August 12	@ Diamondbacks	7–6	**Aaron Nola** (3–1)	Chase Anderson (5–5)	**Ken Giles** (7)	18,047	46–69
116	August 14	@ Brewers	1–3	Wily Peralta (3–7)	**Adam Morgan** (3–4)	Francisco Rodríguez (27)	34,735	46–70
117	August 15	@ Brewers	2–4	Will Smith (6–2)	**Justin De Fratus** (0–2)	Francisco Rodríguez (28)	39,204	46–71
118	August 16	@ Brewers	1–6	Taylor Jungmann (7–4)	**Aaron Harang** (5–14)	Francisco Rodríguez (29)	33,920	46–72
119	August 18	Blue Jays	5–8	Liam Hendriks (4–0)	**Jeanmar Gómez** (1–3)	Roberto Osuna (14)	26,547	46–73
120	August 19	Blue Jays	7–4	**Adam Morgan** (4–4)	Mark Buehrle (13–6)	**Ken Giles** (8)	26,246	47–73
121	August 20	@ Marlins	7–9	Brad Hand (3–3)	**Jerome Williams** (4–9)	A. J. Ramos (21)	19,689	47–74
122	August 21	@ Marlins	7–1	**Jerad Eickhoff** (1–0)	Kendry Flores (1–2)	—	19,391	48–74
123	August 22	@ Marlins	4–2	**Elvis Araújo** (2–1)	A. J. Ramos (1–4)	**Ken Giles** (9)	22,113	49–74
124	August 23	@ Marlins	2–0	**Aaron Nola** (4–1)	Adam Conley (1–1)	**Ken Giles** (10)	22,693	50–74
125	August 24	Mets	7–16	Sean Gilmartin (3–1)	**Héctor Neris** (2–1)	—	23,744	50–75
126	August 25	Mets	5–6	Noah Syndergaard (8–6)	**Jerome Williams** (4–10)	Jeurys Familia (34)	23,544	50–76
127	August 26	Mets	4–9	Bartolo Colón (11–11)	**Jerad Eickhoff** (1–1)	Tyler Clippard (19)	22,184	50–77
128	August 27	Mets	5–9	Carlos Torres (5–5)	**Héctor Neris** (2–2)	—	22,526	50–78
129	August 28	Padres	7–1	**Aaron Nola** (5–1)	Ian Kennedy (8–12)	**Jerome Williams** (1)	25,145	51–78
130	August 29	Padres	4–3	**Adam Morgan** (5–4)	Colin Rea (2–2)	**Ken Giles** (11)	22,090	52–78
131	August 30	Padres	4–9	James Shields (10–6)	**Alec Asher** (0–1)	—	22,624	52–79
132	August 31	@ Mets	1–3	Bartolo Colón (12–11)	**Jerad Eickhoff** (1–2)	Jeurys Familia (36)	34,233	52–80

September (9–17)

#	Date	Opponent	Score	Win	Loss	Save	Attendance	Record
133	September 1	@ Mets	14–8	**Jeanmar Gómez** (2–3)	Jon Niese (8–10)	—	30,104	53–80
134	September 2	@ Mets	4–9	Matt Harvey (12–7)	**Aaron Nola** (5–2)	—	32,464	53–81
135	September 4	@ Red Sox	5–7	Joe Kelly (9–6)	**Adam Morgan** (5–5)	Robbie Ross, Jr. (1)	33,674	53–82
136	September 5	@ Red Sox	2–9	Wade Miley (11–10)	**Alec Asher** (0–2)	—	36,534	53–83
137	September 6	@ Red Sox	2–6	Eduardo Rodríguez (9–5)	**Jerad Eickhoff** (1–3)	—	34,708	53–84
138	September 7	Braves	2–7	Williams Pérez (5–6)	**Aaron Harang** (5–15)	—	15,125	53–85
139	September 8	Braves	5–0	**Aaron Nola** (6–2)	Ryan Weber (0–1)	**Ken Giles** (12)	15,610	54–85
140	September 9	Braves	1–8	Julio Teherán (10–7)	**David Buchanan** (2–8)	—	15,241	54–86
–	September 10	Cubs	Postponed (rain) Rescheduled for September 11 as part of a doubleheader					
141	September 11 (1)	Cubs	1–5	Jake Arrieta (19–6)	**Adam Morgan** (5–6)	—	see 2nd game	54–87
142	September 11 (2)	Cubs	3–7	Kyle Hendricks (7–6)	**Alec Asher** (0–3)	Héctor Rondón (28)	22,538	54–88
143	September 12	Cubs	7–5	**Ken Giles** (6–2)	Héctor Rondón (5–4)	—	20,813	55–88
144	September 13	Cubs	7–4	**Dalier Hinojosa** (1–0)	Clayton Richard (3–2)	**Ken Giles** (13)	23,450	56–88
145	September 14	Nationals	7–8 (11)	Jonathan Papelbon (4–2)	**Luis García** (3–5)	Doug Fister (1)	15,402	56–89
146	September 15	Nationals	0–4	Stephen Strasburg (9–7)	**David Buchanan** (2–9)	—	15,325	56–90
147	September 16	Nationals	2–12	Gio González (11–7)	**Alec Asher** (0–4)	—	15,753	56–91
148	September 18	@ Braves	1–2	Williams Pérez (6–6)	**Adam Morgan** (5–7)	Arodys Vizcaíno (5)	22,525	56–92
149	September 19	@ Braves	1–2	Edwin Jackson (3–3)	**Jerome Williams** (4–11)	Arodys Vizcaíno (6)	24,855	56–93
150	September 20	@ Braves	1–2	Peter Moylan (1–0)	**Luis García** (3–6)	—	23,723	56–94
151	September 22	@ Marlins	6–2	**Aaron Harang** (6–15)	Tom Koehler (10–14)	—	16,742	57–94
152	September 23	@ Marlins	3–4 (11)	Brian Ellington (2–1)	**Jerome Williams** (4–12)	—	15,662	57–95
153	September 24	@ Marlins	0–1	Bryan Morris (5–3)	**Alec Asher** (0–5)	A. J. Ramos (29)	17,083	57–96
154	September 25	@ Nationals	8–2	**Jerad Eickhoff** (2–3)	Jordan Zimmermann (13–9)	—	31,019	58–96
155	September 26	@ Nationals	1–2 (12)	Matt Thornton (2–1)	**Colton Murray** (0–1)	—	32,086	58–97
156	September 27	@ Nationals	12–5	**Dalier Hinojosa** (2–0)	Jonathan Papelbon (4–3)	—	28,661	59–97
157	September 29	Mets	4–3	**Adam Loewen** (1–0)	Bartolo Colón (14–13)	**Ken Giles** (14)	15,227	60–97
158	September 30	Mets	7–5	**Ken Roberts** (1–1)	Bobby Parnell (2–4)	**Ken Giles** (15)	15,201	61–97

October (2–2)

#	Date	Opponent	Score	Win	Loss	Save	Attendance	Record
159	October 1	Mets	3–0	**Jerad Eickhoff** (3–3)	Sean Gilmartin (3–2)	**Luis García** (2)	13,238	62–97
–	October 2	Marlins	Postponed (rain) Rescheduled for October 3 as part of a doubleheader					
160	October 3 (1)	Marlins	6–7	Chris Narveson (3–1)	**Ken Giles** (6–3)	A. J. Ramos (31)	see 2nd game	62–98
161	October 3 (2)	Marlins	2–5	Justin Nicolino (5–4)	**Alec Asher** (0–6)	A. J. Ramos (32)	16,240	62–99
162	October 4	Marlins	7–2	**Luis García** (4–6)	André Rienzo (0–1)	—	21,734	63–99

== Roster ==
All players who made an appearance for the Phillies during 2015 are included.

2015 Philadelphia Phillies
Roster
Pitchers: 59 Elvis Araújo; 49 Alec Asher; 48 Phillippe Aumont; 38 Chad Billingsley; 55 David Buchanan; 28 Kevin Correia; 30 Justin De Fratus; 63 Jake Diekman; 48 Jerad Eickhoff; 57 Luis García; 53 Ken Giles; 46 Jeanmar Gómez; 52 Severino González; 35 Cole Hamels; 34 Aaron Harang; 94 Dalier Hinojosa; 56 César Jiménez; 21 Adam Loewen; 40 Dustin McGowan; 39 Adam Morgan; 60 Colton Murray; 50 Héctor Neris; 27 Aaron Nola; 61,47 Sean O'Sullivan; 56 Nefi Ogando; 58 Jonathan Papelbon; 62 Kenny Roberts; 60 Seth Rosin; 31 Jerome Williams	Catchers: 28 Erik Kratz; 51 Carlos Ruiz; 29 Cameron Rupp; Infielders: 4 Andrés Blanco; 2 Chase d'Arnaud; 7 Maikel Franco; 13 Freddy Galvis; 16 César Hernández; 6 Ryan Howard; 18 Darin Ruf; 26 Chase Utley	Outfielders: 40 Aaron Altherr; 25 Cody Asche; 17 Brian Bogusevic; 9 Domonic Brown; 15 Jordan Danks; 3 Jeff Francoeur; 37 Odubel Herrera; 2 Ben Revere; 24 Grady Sizemore; 24 Darnell Sweeney	Manager: 45 Pete Mackanin; 23 Ryne Sandberg; Coaches: 10 Larry Bowa (bench); 5 Steve Henderson (hitting); 22 Bob McClure (pitching); 45 Pete Mackanin (third base); 12 John Mizerock (assistant hitting) (third base); 54 Rod Nichols (bullpen); 8 Juan Samuel (first base); 82 Bob Stumpo (bullpen catcher); 81 Jesús Tiamo (bullpen catcher); 61 Jorge Velandia (assistant coach)

== Season notes ==
=== Spring training ===
The Phillies entered spring training with rather low expectations for the upcoming season; in fact, Baseball Prospectus projected the Phillies would go 69–93, which would be the worst record in baseball. Even Phillies' front office personnel conceded that the Phillies were unlikely to be particularly competitive, although eventually, acting team president Pat Gillick suggested the team could hover around .500, depending on whether the team stays healthy, and whether it trades some of its better players such as Cole Hamels, Cliff Lee, or Jonathan Papelbon. Nevertheless, manager Ryne Sandberg expressed optimism at the team's chances, noting they might "surprise some people" in what he called a "transition" season rather than a "rebuilding" one. Among those transitions was at shortstop, where Freddy Galvis was expected to replace all-time Phillies' hits leader Jimmy Rollins. Also, the Phillies sought to piece together an outfield. Domonic Brown moved from left field to right field in the offseason, and Ben Revere was the presumptive starter in center field, which left several players vying for playing time as reserves and situational players. However, at one point Revere spent time in left field while Odubel Herrera played center field; Sandberg commented that Revere's arm may be a better fit in left, and that he was using spring training to experiment.

"Darin Ruf could be a surprise guy for me. Cody Asche and Sizemore might be guys who can chip in. Who knows how many home runs they can hit? If we're just thinking about solid contact and more contact and cutting down strikeouts from the type of team we had last year, I think that will go a long way with us. Driving balls into the gaps and some of those doubles turning into home runs."

— Phillies' manager Ryne Sandberg discussing Phillies lack of power hitters

During spring training, the Phillies did not hit many home runs, which prompted Sandberg to note that throughout the season, the Phillies would play small ball to manufacture runs, especially via bunting and hit and run. As part of that strategy, Sandberg announced that both Revere and Herrera would make the opening day roster, with Revere playing left field and Herrera playing center.

Another key storyline for the Phillies was completing their starting rotation. Hamels, Lee, Aaron Harang, and Jerome Williams comprised the presumed first four in the rotation, but there was significant competition for the fifth starter spot. Among the leading candidates was David Buchanan, who looked to improve after a rookie campaign during which he posted a 6–8 record with a 3.75 earned run average (ERA), and struggled with surrendering home runs. Other candidates included Cuban import Miguel Alfredo Gonzalez, who had failed to live up to expectations after the Phillies signed him as an international free agent due to injuries, among other factors, and Chad Billingsley, who was still recovering from two right elbow surgeries. Late in spring training, after it became clear that Lee was going to miss significant time, the Phillies announced that Hamels, Harang, Williams, and Buchanan were their first four starters, and that there were both internal and external candidates to be the fifth starter. Hamels would start on opening day. On the last day of spring training, the Phillies signed relief pitcher Dustin McGowan who, despite a track record as a reliever, could potentially start if the Phillies needed him to while they awaited the return of Billingsley from the disabled list.

Ultimately, 12 pitchers, two catchers, seven infielders, and four outfielders comprised the Phillies opening day roster.

- Starting pitchers: David Buchanan, Aaron Harang, Cole Hamels, Jerome Williams
- Relief pitchers: Justin De Fratus, Luis Garcia, Ken Giles, Jeanmar Gómez, Dustin McGowan, Jonathan Papelbon, Jake Diekman, Cesar Jimenez
- Catchers: Carlos Ruiz, Cameron Rupp
- Infielders: Cody Asche, Andrés Blanco, Freddy Galvis, Cesar Hernandez, Ryan Howard, Darin Ruf, Chase Utley
- Outfielders: Jeff Francoeur, Odubel Herrera, Ben Revere, Grady Sizemore

=== April ===
After a "drubbing" on opening day in which the Phillies surrendered five home runs to lose 8–0 – their worst opening day shutout in team history – they rebounded to beat the Boston Red Sox in the series' second game behind a strong start from Aaron Harang that "closely emulated [the opening day starts] of the pitcher who made five consecutive opening-day starts for the Reds" before a loss in the rubber match during which David Buchanan pitched only three innings, allowing six runs, and snapping a streak of 16 starts in which Buchanan allowed three or fewer earned runs. Against the NL East favorite Washington Nationals, the Phillies won two of three, including a 10-inning bout in which Darin Ruf hit a home run, and Cody Asche had three hits.

The Phillies' third series of the year was against the New York Mets; both squads entered the series with a 3–3 record. Despite one game in which Chase Utley homered twice and another in which Odubel Herrera notched three extra-base hits, the Mets swept the Phillies. The team continued a road trip in Washington, and opened a four-game set with the Nationals by losing two, extending their losing streak to six games before beating the Nationals 5–3 thanks to strong offensive efforts from Herrera and Freddy Galvis, and a quality start from Harang. Unable to build momentum, the Phillies lost the series finale to drop their record to 4–9 on the season.

The Phillies entered their next series with the Marlins averaging only 2.46 runs per game, among the worst in the major leagues. However, they did win the first game of the series 7–3 thanks to home runs from Galvis and Ryan Howard, and a two-RBI triple from Ben Revere. The woeful offense manifested itself during the remainder of the series, as the squad mustered only two total runs, losing both games. The homestand continued with a series against the Atlanta Braves. After winning the first game 1–0 thanks to a strong start from Harang and a late-inning error by Freddie Freeman and losing the second game 5–2 with Buchanan's fourth loss of the season, the Phillies took the rubber match when Howard hit his second home run of the series (third of the season).

The team's final series of the month was a four-game set in St. Louis to face the Cardinals. Notwithstanding heating trade rumors including a potential deal to the Cardinals, Hamels picked up his first win of the season, leading the Phillies to a 4–1 victory. The next evening, Panamanian rookie Severino González made his major league debut, but was unsuccessful, relinquishing seven runs in 2 2/3 innings as the Phillies lost 11–5. The Phillies also lost the final two games, and finished the month of April with an 8–15 record, their worst April record since 2002.

The team's .223 batting average was also the worst in the National League; they also ranked last or tied for last in the NL in runs, runs per game, and home runs. The bullpen was markedly better than the starting rotation; the former ranked fourth in the NL in ERA, while the latter ranked 13th. As of the end of the month, Chase Utley had a .114 batting average, the worst in the major leagues. Meanwhile, Harang posted a rotation-leading 2.51 ERA in 32 1/3 innings pitched during the month, and was even mentioned as a potential candidate to be traded to a contending team.

=== May ===
The Phillies began the month by reshuffling their pitching staff, optioning David Buchanan (0–5, 8.76 ERA in April) to Triple-A Lehigh Valley, recalling Elvis Araújo (who conspicuously had similar struggles in the minor leagues), and preparing to add Chad Billingsley to the starting rotation.

== Statistics ==
Through October 4, 2015

=== Batting ===
Note: G = Games played; AB = At bats; R = Runs scored; H = Hits; 2B = Doubles; 3B = Triples; HR = Home runs; RBI = Runs batted in; BB = Base on balls; SO = Strikeouts; AVG = Batting average; SB = Stolen bases

Player	G	AB	R	H	2B	3B	HR	RBI	BB	SO	AVG	SB
Aaron Altherr, OF	39	137	25	33	11	4	5	22	16	41	.241	6
Elvis Araújo, P	40	1	0	0	0	0	0	0	0	1	.000	0
Cody Asche, LF	129	425	41	104	22	3	12	39	26	111	.245	1
Alec Asher, P	7	6	0	2	1	0	0	0	0	3	.333	0
Phillippe Aumont, P	1	0	0	0	0	0	0	0	1	0	.000	0
Chad Billingsley, P	7	13	2	1	0	0	1	1	0	5	.077	0
Andrés Blanco, 3B	106	233	32	68	22	3	7	25	21	44	.292	1
Brian Bogusevic, RF	22	58	9	15	3	0	2	5	3	21	.259	2
Domonic Brown, RF	63	189	19	43	6	1	5	25	14	36	.228	3
David Buchanan, P	15	20	2	4	1	0	0	1	2	8	.200	0
Kevin Correia, P	5	6	0	1	0	0	0	0	0	1	.167	0
Jordan Danks, LF	4	4	0	0	0	0	0	0	0	2	.000	0
Chase d'Arnaud, IF	11	17	2	3	0	1	0	0	1	7	.176	0
Justin De Fratus, P	61	3	0	1	0	0	0	0	0	1	.333	0
Jerad Eickhoff, P	8	14	1	2	0	0	0	2	0	7	.143	0
Maikel Franco, 3B	80	304	45	85	22	1	14	50	26	52	.280	1
Jeff Francoeur, RF	119	326	34	84	16	1	13	45	13	77	.258	0
Freddy Galvis, SS	151	559	63	147	14	5	7	50	30	103	.263	10
Severino González, P	7	10	2	1	0	0	0	1	1	4	.100	0
Cole Hamels, P	20	39	2	6	1	0	0	0	0	15	.154	0
Aaron Harang, P	29	48	4	8	1	0	0	0	1	18	.167	0
César Hernández, 2B	127	405	57	110	20	4	1	35	40	86	.272	19
Odubel Herrera, CF	147	495	64	147	30	3	8	41	28	129	.297	16
Ryan Howard, 1B	129	467	53	107	29	1	23	77	27	138	.229	0
Erik Kratz, UT	12	22	3	5	2	0	0	2	1	3	.227	0
Adam Loewen, P	20	3	0	1	0	0	0	0	0	0	.333	0
Dustin McGowan, P	14	3	0	0	0	0	0	0	0	3	.000	0
Adam Morgan, P	15	26	2	2	1	0	0	1	0	12	.077	0
Héctor Neris, P	32	1	0	0	0	0	0	0	0	1	.000	0
Aaron Nola, P	13	23	0	2	0	0	0	1	1	16	.087	0
Sean O'Sullivan, P	13	20	2	2	1	0	0	0	1	10	.100	0
Ben Revere, OF	96	366	49	109	13	6	1	26	19	36	.298	24
Darin Ruf, 1B	106	268	30	63	12	0	12	39	21	69	.235	1
Carlos Ruiz, C	86	284	23	60	13	1	2	22	28	43	.211	1
Cameron Rupp, C	81	270	24	63	9	1	9	28	24	71	.233	0
Grady Sizemore, RF	39	98	4	24	5	0	0	6	6	23	.245	0
Darnell Sweeney, CF	37	85	9	15	4	1	3	11	13	27	.176	0
Chase Utley, 2B	73	249	23	54	12	1	5	30	22	35	.217	3
Jerome Williams, P	33	31	0	2	1	0	0	1	1	14	.065	0
Team totals	162	5529	626	1374	272	37	130	586	387	1274	.249	88

=== Pitching ===
Note: W = Wins; L = Losses; ERA = Earned run average; G = Games pitched; GS = Games started; SV = Saves; IP = Innings pitched; H = Hits allowed; R = Runs allowed; ER = Earned runs allowed; HR = Home runs allowed; BB = Walks allowed; K = Strikeouts

Player	W	L	ERA	G	GS	SV	IP	H	R	ER	HR	BB	K
Elvis Araújo	2	1	3.38	40	0	0	34.2	29	16	13	1	19	34
Alec Asher	0	6	9.31	7	7	0	29.0	42	30	30	8	10	16
Phillippe Aumont	0	1	13.50	1	1	0	4.0	5	6	6	2	7	3
Chad Billingsley	2	3	5.84	7	7	0	37.0	53	26	24	5	8	15
David Buchanan	2	9	6.99	15	15	0	74.2	109	58	58	12	29	44
Kevin Correia	0	3	6.56	5	5	0	23.1	37	23	17	4	8	14
Justin De Fratus	0	2	5.51	61	0	0	80.0	92	52	49	9	32	68
Jake Diekman	2	1	5.15	41	0	0	36.2	40	23	21	3	24	49
Jerad Eickhoff	3	3	2.65	8	8	0	51.0	40	15	15	5	13	49
Jeff Francoeur	0	0	9.00	1	0	0	2.0	1	2	2	1	3	1
Luis García	4	6	3.51	72	0	2	66.2	72	27	26	4	37	63
Ken Giles	6	3	1.80	69	0	15	70.0	59	21	14	2	25	87
Jeanmar Gómez	2	3	3.01	65	0	0	74.2	82	27	25	4	17	50
Severino González	3	3	7.92	7	7	0	30.2	44	27	27	5	7	28
Cole Hamels	6	7	3.64	20	20	0	128.2	113	53	52	12	39	137
Aaron Harang	6	15	4.86	29	29	0	172.1	189	99	93	26	51	108
Dalier Hinojosa	2	0	0.78	18	0	0	23.0	15	2	2	1	8	21
César Jiménez	0	0	0.00	3	0	0	3.1	1	0	0	0	0	4
Adam Loewen	1	0	6.98	20	0	0	19.1	20	15	15	3	17	22
Dustin McGowan	1	2	6.94	14	1	0	23.1	29	21	18	7	20	21
Adam Morgan	5	7	4.48	15	15	0	84.1	88	43	42	14	17	49
Colton Murray	0	1	5.87	8	0	0	7.2	11	5	5	2	2	9
Héctor Neris	2	2	3.79	32	0	0	40.1	38	17	17	8	10	41
Aaron Nola	6	2	3.59	13	13	0	77.2	74	31	31	11	19	68
Nefi Ogando	0	0	9.00	4	0	0	4.0	7	5	4	0	2	2
Sean O'Sullivan	1	6	6.08	13	13	0	71.0	94	49	48	16	20	35
Jonathan Papelbon	2	1	1.59	37	0	17	39.2	31	9	7	3	8	40
Ken Roberts	1	0	10.38	6	0	0	4.1	9	5	5	0	1	1
Seth Rosin	0	0	22.50	1	0	0	2.0	7	5	5	1	1	0
Jerome Williams	4	12	5.80	33	21	1	121.0	161	83	78	22	34	74
Team totals	63	99	4.69	162	162	35	1436.1	1592	809	749	191	488	1153

== Farm system ==
Level	Team	League	Manager
AAA	Lehigh Valley IronPigs	International League	Dave Brundage
AA	Reading Fightin Phils	Eastern League	Dusty Wathan
A-Advanced	Clearwater Threshers	Florida State League	Greg Legg
A	Lakewood BlueClaws	South Atlantic League	Shawn Williams
A-Short Season	Williamsport Crosscutters	New York–Penn League	Pat Borders
Rookie	GCL Phillies	Gulf Coast League	Roly de Armas
Rookie	VSL Phillies	Venezuelan Summer League	
Rookie	DSL Phillies	Dominican Summer League	Manny Amador
