= David Buchanan (baseball) =

American baseball player (born 1989)

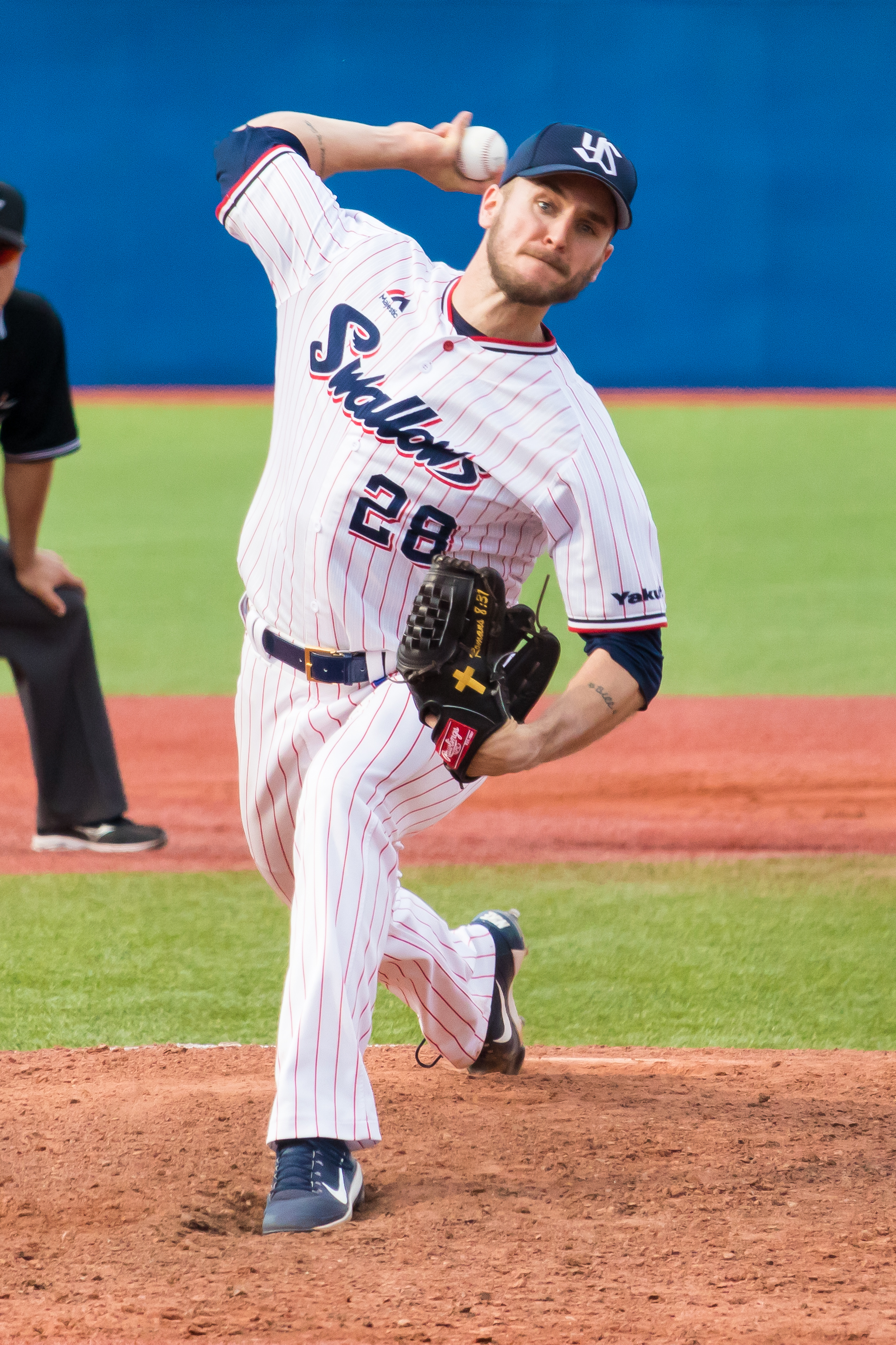
- Buchanan with the Yakult Swallows

TSG Hawks – No. 98
- Starting pitcher
- Born: May 11, 1989 (age 37); Atlanta, Georgia, U.S.
- Bats: Right Throws: Right

Professional debut
- MLB: May 24, 2014, for the Philadelphia Phillies
- NPB: April 4, 2017, for the Tokyo Yakult Swallows
- KBO: May 7, 2020, for the Samsung Lions
- CPBL: June 13, 2025, for the Fubon Guardians

MLB statistics (through 2024 season)
- Win–loss record: 8–17
- Earned run average: 4.97
- Strikeouts: 116

NPB statistics (through 2019 season)
- Win–loss record: 20–30
- Earned run average: 4.07
- Strikeouts: 265

KBO statistics (through 2023 season)
- Win–loss record: 54–28
- Earned run average: 3.02
- Strikeouts: 539

CPBL statistics (through May 10, 2026)
- Win–loss record: 3–6
- Earned run average: 2.46
- Strikeouts: 61
- Stats at Baseball Reference

Teams
- Philadelphia Phillies (2014–2015); Tokyo Yakult Swallows (2017–2019); Samsung Lions (2020–2023); Cincinnati Reds (2024); Fubon Guardians (2025); TSG Hawks (2026–present)

Career highlights and awards
- 2× KBO All–Star (2022, 2023); KBO Wins leader (2021)

David Andrew Buchanan (born May 11, 1989), is an American professional baseball pitcher for the TSG Hawks of the Chinese Professional Baseball League (CPBL). He has previously played in Major League Baseball (MLB) for the Philadelphia Phillies and Cincinnati Reds, in Nippon Professional Baseball (NPB) for the Tokyo Yakult Swallows, and in the KBO League for the Samsung Lions, and in the CPBL for the Fubon Guardians.

After growing up in Atlanta, Georgia, Buchanan attended Chipola College from which the New York Mets drafted him in 2009; he did not sign, instead attending Georgia State University. The Philadelphia Phillies drafted Buchanan in 2010, and he quickly moved through their Minor League Baseball (MiLB) system.

== Early life ==
The son of Andrew Buchanan and Stacy Wood, Buchanan is one of seven children, (he has two sisters, three step-sisters and one step-brother). He was born in Atlanta, Georgia on May 11, 1989. He attended Fayette County High School, where he played baseball, and, during his senior season, won team most valuable player accolades. He also holds the Fayette County single-game strikeout record (19). Subsequently, he attended Chipola College, a junior college, for two seasons, and earned placement on Baseball America's list of the top 40 prospects in Florida. After the 2009 season, the New York Mets drafted him in the sixth round of the 2009 Major League Baseball draft, however he did not sign, instead opting to attend Georgia State University. He played for Georgia State during the 2010 season, and was the team's top pitcher, earning several honors from the Colonial Athletic Association before a finger injury caused him to miss significant time. After the 2010 season, he briefly played collegiate summer baseball with the Brewster Whitecaps of the Cape Cod Baseball League. The Philadelphia Phillies drafted him in the seventh round of the 2010 Major League Baseball draft. Scout Ellis Dungan signed him to a contract, and he thus began his professional career.

== Professional career ==
=== Philadelphia Phillies ===
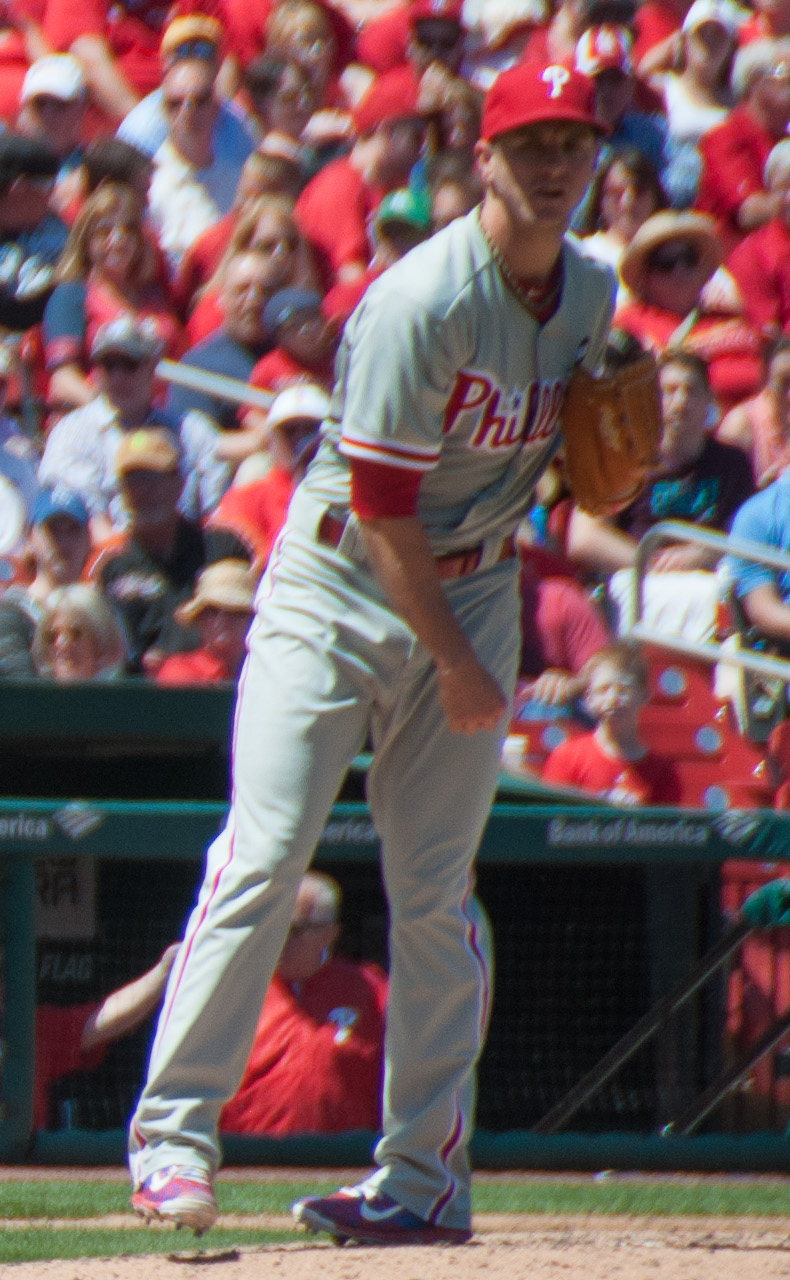
Buchanan with the Philadelphia Phillies

He began his professional career in 2010 as a member of the Williamsport Crosscutters, with whom he started 13 games, losing only one of them, and recording a 4.21 earned run average (ERA). At the conclusion of the season, he played in the Florida Instructional League. He progressed to the Single–A and High–A level in 2011, pitching for both the Lakewood BlueClaws and the Clearwater Threshers, and combining to post a 3.49 ERA in 26 starts. He finished third in the South Atlantic League (with Lakewood) by posting 11 wins, and finished seventh with a 3.38 ERA. His steady advancement through the minor league system continued in 2012; the next year, he spent a full season with the Reading Fightin Phils of Double–A. Despite his fast ascent through the minor league system, he flew "under the radar" with Reading, despite a 3.86 ERA. However, his season ended in June when the Phillies placed him on the disabled list due to a ligament injury in his middle finger.

After splitting his time in the 2013 season between the Fightin Phils and the Lehigh Valley IronPigs (Triple–A – International League), Buchanan attended a Prospect Education Program hosted by the Phillies organization in January 2014. At the time, he was the only one of the eight attendees who had not been invited to major league camp at spring training, however after taking a "leadership role" at the program, Joe Jordan (the Phillies' director of player development) and manager Ryne Sandberg tendered Buchanan an invitation to big league camp. He entered camp competing for a spot in the Phillies rotation, and impressed the Phillies' staff, ultimately becoming a finalist for the position with Jeff Manship. He did not make the opening day roster despite his strong performance, but would remain in consideration for promotion during the 2014 season, particularly as a spot starter or even the Phillies' fifth starter if needed due to injury. Buchanan commented, "I wanted to come in here and make an impression and open us some eyes and I feel like I did that. I feel like I proved myself that I am ready for the next level. I had a blast every day in camp."

With his college coach on hand to witness a "monumental time in Georgia State baseball history", Buchanan made his major league debut against the Los Angeles Dodgers on May 24, 2014. Replacing Cliff Lee, who was injured, Buchanan pitched five innings, and struck out two batters, and allowed five hits, two runs, and no walks in only 66 pitches, en route to earning the win. In his 2014 rookie campaign, Buchanan went 6–8 in 20 starts, with a 3.75 ERA along with 71 strikeouts in 117 2/3 innings.

Coming off of an efficient rookie season, the Phillies placed Buchanan as the third starter in their starting rotation going into their 2015 season. After recording a 8.76 ERA giving up 15 walks and 32 hits in first 5 starts to begin the season, the Phillies optioned Buchanan to Lehigh Valley, calling up left-handed relief pitcher Elvis Araujo from Double-A Reading in his place.

Buchanan was called back up on July 7, 2015, to fill the starting rotation in place of Kevin Correia and Sean O'Sullivan, who were designated for assignment. Buchanan pitched two games with a more respectable 3.18 ERA, giving up 14 hits and 3 walks en route to winning his first decision of the season on July 21, 2015, against the Tampa Bay Rays when he was optioned again to Triple-A after the game to make space in the rotation for Jerome Williams and Aaron Nola. He was recalled a second time just 11 days after roster spots were filled up with trades of Cole Hamels, Jake Diekman and Ben Revere at the trade deadline. Earning his second winning decision against the Atlanta Braves that same day, he lost his next two starts with a 14.54 ERA, giving up 29 hits (5 of them home runs) and 3 walks in the 3 starts since being recalled a second time including a game against the Arizona Diamondbacks where he gave up 11 earned runs in just 1 2/3 innings.

After that poor start, Buchanan was optioned a third time to Triple-A, with reliever Cesar Jimenez being called up. Buchanan returned to the major league club for the final two months of the season after the conclusion of the Lehigh Valley Iron Pigs' season, pitching in a sixth-man starting rotation manufactured by the Phillies to conserve pitchers. Buchanan started 5 more games for the Phillies that season, going winless with two losses for final record of 2–9 in 15 starts, with a team-high 6.99 ERA among qualifying pitchers that season with 44 strikeouts in 74 2/3 innings pitched.

Buchanan did not play for the Phillies during their 2016 season, spending the whole season with Lehigh Valley and was designated for assignment in November 2016, being released by the organization on November 23.

=== Tokyo Yakult Swallows ===
On December 19, 2016, Buchanan signed with the Tokyo Yakult Swallows of Nippon Professional Baseball. On December 13, 2019, he became a free agent.

=== Samsung Lions ===
On January 16, 2020, Buchanan signed a one-year, $850,000 deal with the Samsung Lions of the KBO League. On December 8, 2020, Buchanan resigned with the Lions on a one-year, $1MM deal after pitching to a 3.45 ERA over 174.2 innings for the club in 2020. On December 16, 2021, Buchanan again re-signed for the 2022 season after tying the league-high in wins (16) and setting franchise records for most victories and innings pitched by a foreign player in 2021. Buchanan was named a KBO All-Star for the team in 2022. On December 4, 2022, Buchanan re-signed a one-year $1.6 million contract for the 2023 season.

Buchanan was again named a KBO All–Star in 2023.

On January 4, 2024, Buchanan posted on his wife's Instagram account that he would not be returning to the Samsung Lions for a fifth season.

=== Philadelphia Phillies (second stint) ===
On February 13, 2024, Buchanan signed a minor league contract with the Philadelphia Phillies. In 22 games for the Triple–A Lehigh Valley IronPigs, Buchanan logged a 9–3 record and 4.82 ERA with 78 strikeouts across 102 2/3 innings pitched.

=== Cincinnati Reds ===
On August 27, 2024, Buchanan was traded to the Cincinnati Reds in exchange for cash considerations. His contract was selected on August 31 and he was added to the Major League roster, his first time on an MLB roster in nearly nine years. He tossed 3 1/3 innings of one–run ball against the Milwaukee Brewers, and was designated for assignment by Cincinnati the following day. Buchanan cleared waivers and was sent outright to the Triple–A Louisville Bats on September 3. He elected free agency on October 31.

=== Texas Rangers ===
On January 3, 2025, Buchanan signed a minor league contract with the Texas Rangers. In six starts for the Triple-A Round Rock Express, he logged an 0–1 record and 5.28 ERA with 19 strikeouts over 29 innings of work. Buchanan was released by the Rangers organization on April 28.

=== Fubon Guardians ===
On May 3, 2025, Buchanan signed with the Fubon Guardians of the Chinese Professional Baseball League. He made 11 starts for the Guardians, compiling a 1-4 record and 1.95 ERA with 39 strikeouts across 64 2/3 innings pitched. Buchanan became a free agent following the season.

=== TSG Hawks ===
On February 28, 2026, Buchanan signed with the TSG Hawks of the Chinese Professional Baseball League.

== Pitcher profile ==
Almost as soon as he was drafted into the Phillies organization, Buchanan drew comparisons to Kyle Kendrick, a pitcher who possesses similar attributes, specifically that they are built similarly in terms of height and weight, and that they both are reliable groundball pitchers. Also similar to Kendrick, many fans and others have overlooked Buchanan during his minor league tenure; he did not receive any interview requests during the Reading Phillies' media day in 2012, despite being one of the team's top starting pitchers. An article in The Times Herald asserted, "Most of what gets Buchanan overlooked are the things that get his pitching compared to Kendrick’s: He isn’t overpowering, but he uses a sinker and control on the corners to coax ground balls and keep his team in games. That capability has earned Kendrick 153 starts and 64 wins over the last seven seasons with the Phillies, not to mention a $7.7 million deal in 2014 as he approaches free agency." Buchanan also possesses a strong work ethic – instead of talking to the media or celebrating with teammates after throwing seven scoreless innings and striking out nine, he completed a 45-minute medicine ball workout. In addition to the aforementioned sinker, he throws a slider and a changeup.

== Personal life ==
Outside of baseball, Buchanan's hobbies include playing the drums and guitar, golfing, drawing, yoga, watching movies, playing spades, and other various "outdoor activities". During the offseason, he resides in Peachtree City, Georgia.
