= Adam Morgan (baseball) =

American baseball player (born 1990)

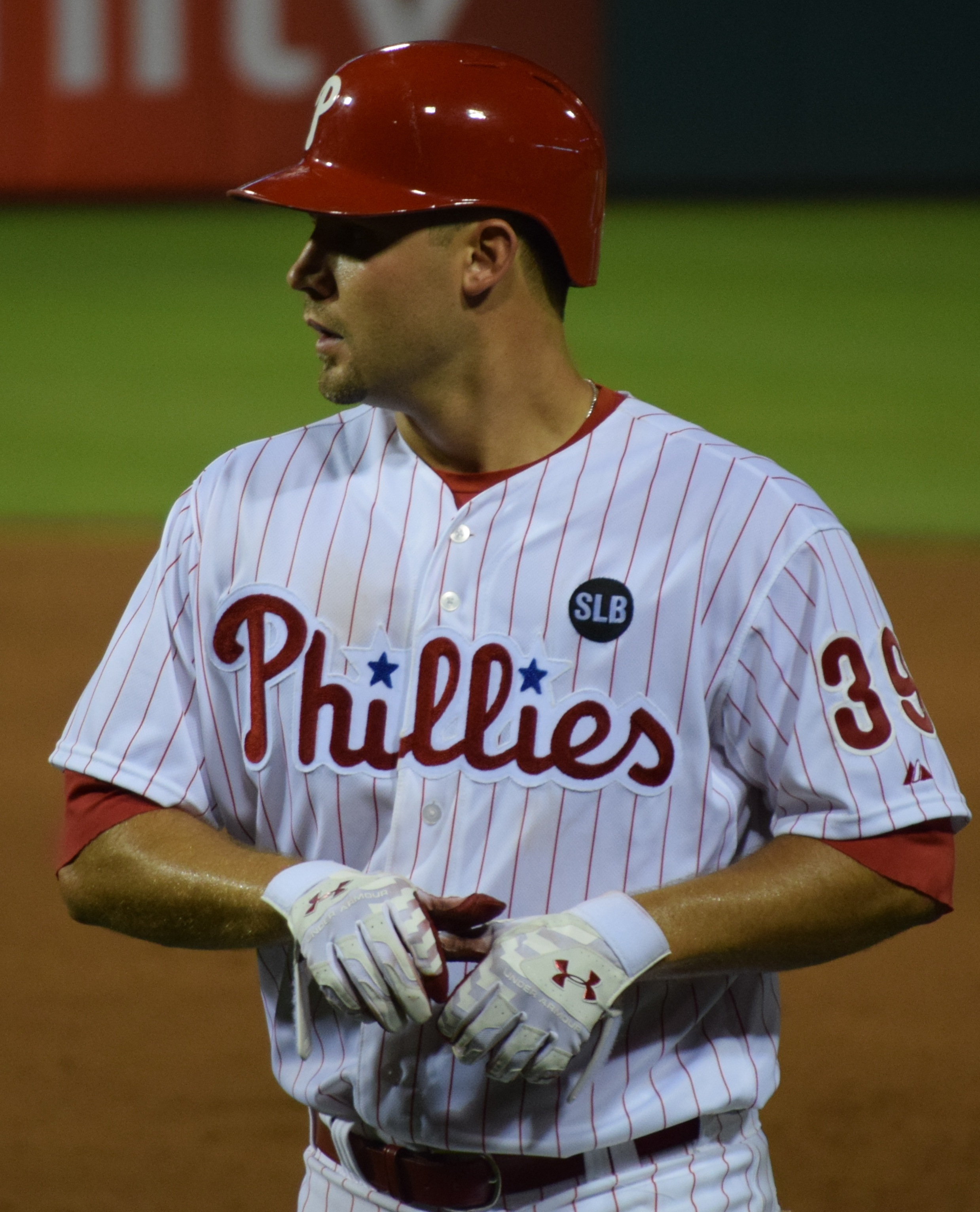
- Morgan with the Philadelphia Phillies in 2015
- Pitcher
- Born: February 27, 1990 (age 36); Tampa, Florida, U.S.
- Batted: Left Threw: Left

MLB debut
- June 21, 2015, for the Philadelphia Phillies

Last MLB appearance
- September 29, 2021, for the Chicago Cubs

MLB statistics
- Win–loss record: 15–28
- Earned run average: 4.80
- Strikeouts: 330
- Stats at Baseball Reference

Teams
- Philadelphia Phillies (2015–2020); Chicago Cubs (2021)

Adam Christopher Morgan (born February 27, 1990) is an American former professional baseball pitcher. He played in Major League Baseball (MLB) for the Philadelphia Phillies and the Chicago Cubs.

After growing up and playing high school baseball in Marietta, Georgia, he enrolled at the University of Alabama, where, as his father had done, he played college baseball. The Phillies drafted him in the third round of the 2011 MLB draft. Morgan was among the top pitching prospects in the organization until a torn rotator cuff caused him to miss all of the 2014 season. He made his major league debut in 2015. He became a relief pitcher in 2017.

== Early life ==
Morgan was born to Wiley and Karen Morgan in Tampa, Florida, and has a younger brother named Grant. He attended Kell High School ('08) in Marietta, Georgia, where he played baseball on a team that went to the state playoffs three times. He also played on various travel teams, including in the Amateur Athletic Union (AAU).

Morgan attended the University of Alabama, where he played college baseball for the Alabama Crimson Tide baseball team. His father had played college baseball as a pitcher at the university. With Alabama, he developed a "devastating slider" that contributed to high strikeout rates throughout his career. He notched the first complete game of his collegiate career in an outing against Georgia Tech in the 2010 NCAA Baseball Regional. After the 2010 season, he played collegiate summer baseball with the Harwich Mariners of the Cape Cod Baseball League and was named a league all-star. His junior year, he formed part of a tandem atop Alabama's starting rotation that helped lead the Crimson Tide back to the NCAA Super Regional.

== Professional career ==
=== Philadelphia Phillies ===
==== Minor leagues ====
The Philadelphia Phillies drafted Morgan in the third round of the 2011 MLB draft and signed him for a $250,000 signing bonus, and assigned him to the Williamsport Crosscutters of the Class A-Short Season New York-Pennsylvania League, with whom he compiled a 3–3 win–loss record and a 2.01 earned run average (ERA) and 43 strikeouts in 53 2/3 innings. Advancing to the Clearwater Threshers of the Class A-Advanced Florida State League in 2012, Morgan made 20 starts and struck out 10.24 batters per nine innings (5th in the league) with 28 walks and 140 strikeouts (2nd) in 123 innings, and a second-best in the league 5.00 strikeouts/walk ratio. That earned him a promotion to the Reading Phillies of the Class AA Eastern League in August with whom he was 4–1 with a 3.53 ERA and 29 strikeouts in 35 2/3 innings.

After notching an "impressive" performance with Reading, the Phillies invited him to spring training in 2013. A column written years later noted, "At 22, he was seen as one of the most advanced pitching prospects in the organization, and a call-up to the big club seemed imminent for sometime in 2013 ... However, as happens with pitchers, Morgan suffered a setback." Pitching for the Lehigh Valley IronPigs of the Class AAA International League, after pitching to a record of 2–7 with a 4.04 ERA and 49 strikeouts in 79 1/3 innings, Morgan suffered a torn rotator cuff in his left throwing shoulder in May 2013, which required surgery; he did not undergo surgery, however, until January, and thus missed the 2014 season. After the 2014 season, the Phillies added Morgan to their 40-man roster.

Entering 2015 fully healthy with improved mechanics, Morgan looked to re-establish himself in the IronPigs' starting rotation before a potential call-up to the major leagues later in the season. With Lehigh Valley, Morgan posted a record of 0–6 with a 4.74 ERA with 33 strikeouts in 68 1/3 innings in 13 starts. His mediocre statistics notwithstanding, minor league talent evaluator Matt Winkelman commented that Morgan's "velocity [is] almost back and slider is almost there."

==== Major leagues ====
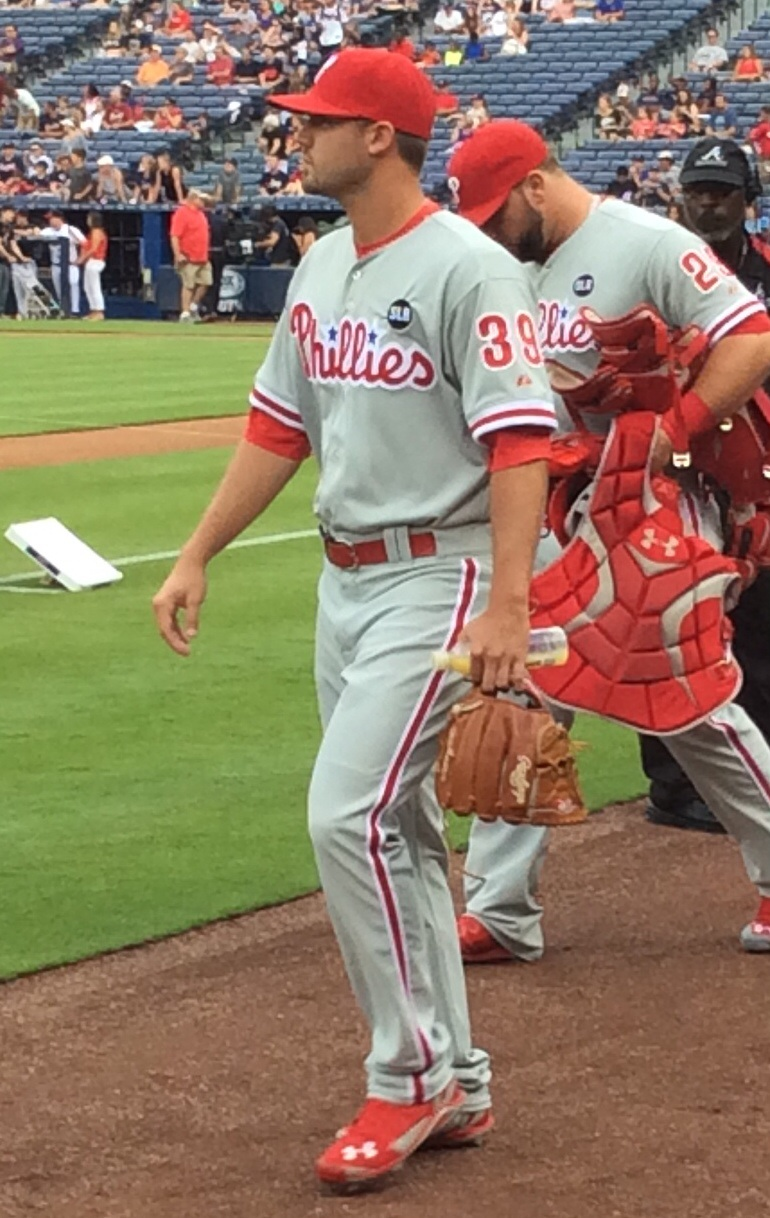
Morgan before a game against the Braves on July 3, 2015

Morgan began the 2015 season with Lehigh Valley, and the Phillies promoted him to the major leagues to make his debut on June 21 in place of injured Phillies' starter Jerome Williams despite him posting a poor 0–6 record in 13 starts with Lehigh Valley. Morgan pitched 5 2/3 innings in his debut, which came against the St. Louis Cardinals, who coming into the game had the best record in the National League. He allowed only one run, struck out 6, and earned the win, also earning an opportunity to start a second game. Morgan after making his major league debut stated that "he looked down the whole game" and that he "didn't want to try to do too much or overthink." Morgan started the first game after the All-Star break for the Phillies, and although one columnist opined that he "deserves better" than to be removed from a game with a low pitch count only to have the lead he helped build evaporate, the Phillies ended up earning the win, and Morgan received praise from interim manager Pete Mackanin, who said Morgan "showed no fear" on the mound. Mackanin expressed a willingness to let Morgan pitch in tough situations to see how he would respond during the second half of the season. Through his first several starts, Morgan showed promise of developing into a legitimate middle-to-back-of-the-rotation starter, but needed to focus on keeping the ball down to avoid allowing hitters to make solid contact and hit home runs, something they had done five times in his first five starts. In 2015 with the Phillies he was 5–7 starting 15 games, with a 4.48 ERA with 49 strikeouts in 84 1/3 innings.

In 2016 with the IronPigs he was 6–1 with a 3.04 ERA and 52 strikeouts in 50 1/3 innings. On August 14, 2016, he was recalled by the Phillies. In 2016 with the Phillies he was 2–11 starting 21 games, with a team-high 6.04 ERA among qualified pitchers that season with 95 strikeouts in 113 1/3 innings.

Morgan made the 2017 Opening Day roster in the role as a long reliever. He was optioned to Lehigh Valley two weeks later, after struggling in two appearances. Morgan considered retiring and moving to Atlanta to become a firefighter, but reported to Lehigh Valley and returned to the major leagues briefly in May and again in June for the rest of the season. After his June promotion, Morgan's average fastball velocity increased from 90 miles per hour (140 km/h) to 97 miles per hour (156 km/h) as he acclimated to pitching more as a left-handed specialist out of the Phillies' bullpen. At the end of his 2017 season, he was 3–3 with a 4.12 ERA with 63 strikeouts in 54 2/3 innings.

In 2018, he was 0–2 with one save and a 3.83 ERA with 50 strikeouts in 49 1/3 innings for the Phillies. In 2019, he was 3–3 with a 3.94 ERA along with 29 strikeouts in 29 2/3 innings for the Phillies, and ended his season early on the injured list with a left hip flexor strain.

In the pandemic shortened 2020 season, Morgan went 0–1 in 17 games, with a 5.54 ERA with 16 strikeouts in 13 innings for the Phillies. On October 29, 2020, Morgan was outrighted off of the 40-man roster after having surgery to repair an injury he received on the flexor pronator in his throwing arm, and he elected free agency the next day.

=== Chicago Cubs ===
On January 3, 2021, Morgan signed a minor league contract with the Chicago Cubs organization that included an invitation to Spring Training. On June 29, Morgan was selected to the active roster posting a 2–1 record in 34 games, a 4.26 ERA with 28 strikeouts along with 2 saves in 25 1/3 innings. He elected free agency on November 4, 2021.

=== Houston Astros ===
On March 21, 2022, Morgan signed a minor league contract with the Houston Astros. On May 1, Morgan triggered the opt-out clause in his contract and became a free agent.

== Pitching style ==
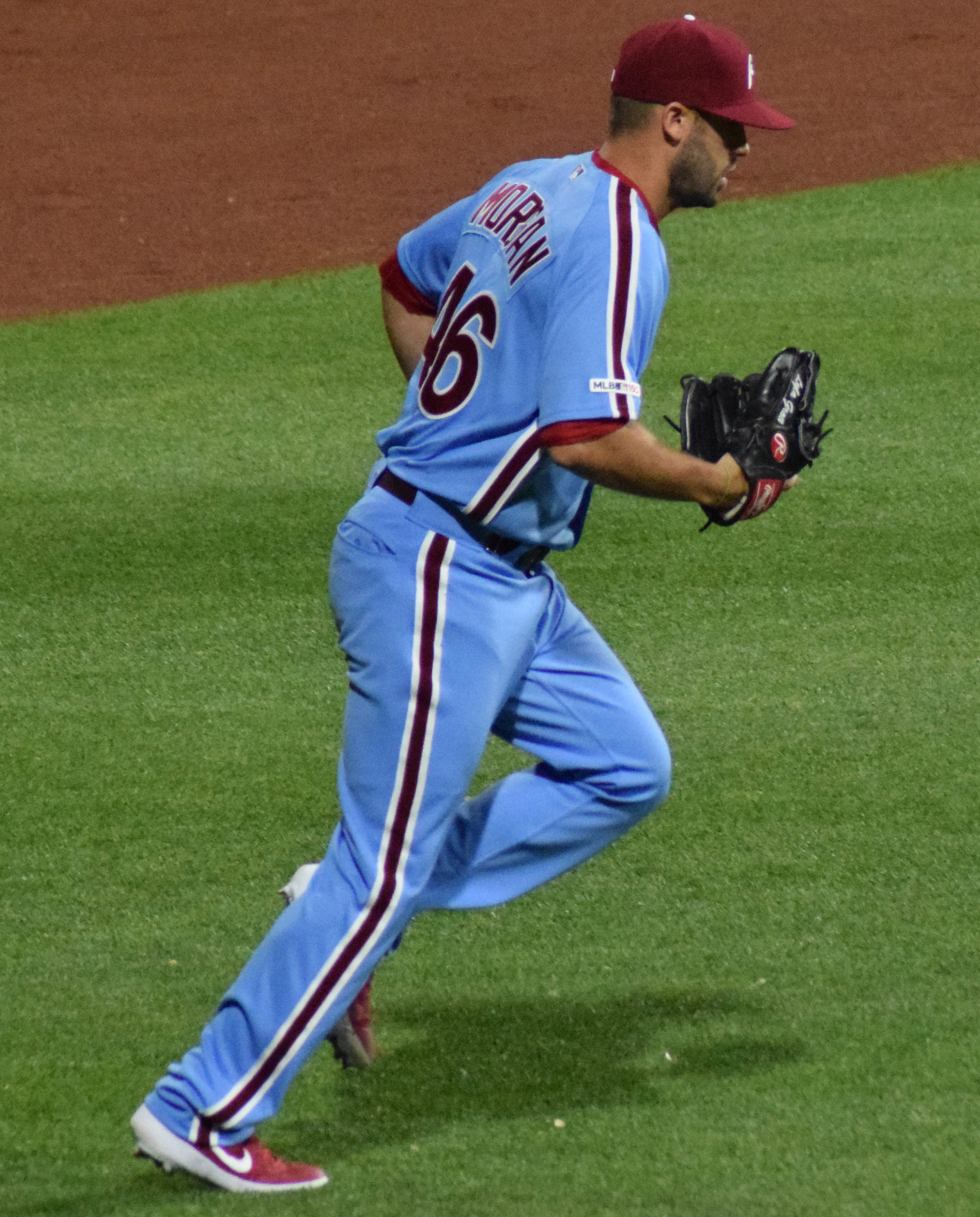
Morgan in 2019 during a game at Citizen Bank Park

Morgan as a starting pitcher early in his career was a control pitcher who lacked overwhelming velocity, instead relying on maintaining good command of his pitches to get weak contact and retire hitters. He relied on three predominant pitches – a four-seam fastball that seldom exceeded 92 miles per hour (148 km/h), and averaged around 89 miles per hour (143 km/h), a slider with which he can generate swings and misses, a changeup, and an occasional curveball. Phillies' interim manager Pete Mackanin in 2015 praised Morgan's feel for pitching, and said of his pitching style: "He knows what he’s doing. He knows how to mix his pitches, change speeds. He has that excellent changeup to fool a lot of hitters with, and when he spots his fastball down in the zone, he’s a real good pitcher." After another start, Mackanin complimented Morgan's changeup, referring to it as a "Bugs Bunny changeup".

After transitioning to the bullpen full-time and being called back up from Lehigh Valley in 2017, Morgan's velocity went up on his slider and fastball as his fastballs particularly risen up to an average of 94 miles per hour (151 km/h). Morgan claimed this jump in velocity is a result of "his becoming more accustomed to a reliever's routine. It allows him to do more long-tossing during workouts and that has improved his arm strength. He has also become more confident."

Morgan since becoming a relief pitcher, has used his slider more than his fastball especially against left-handed hitters, utilizing it at least 61 percent of his pitches thrown against left-handed batters each season since 2017 and using it at least over 32 percent against all batters. Morgan has used his slider to generate a large majority of his swings and misses since 2017 as well as striking out higher percentage of batters he faced as reliever than as a starter. Morgan developed and began relying more on a sinker/two-seam fastball in his arsenal, throwing it 56 more times than his four-seam fastball between 2017 and 2021.

== Personal life ==
Morgan and his wife, Rachel, have one son and one daughter together.
