= Nefi Ogando =

Dominican baseball player (born 1989)

- Pitcher
- Born: June 3, 1989 (age 37); Santo Domingo, Distrito Nacional, Dominican Republic
- Batted: Right Threw: Right

MLB debut
- September 9, 2015, for the Philadelphia Phillies

Last MLB appearance
- October 2, 2016, for the Miami Marlins

MLB statistics
- Win–loss record: 0–0
- Earned run average: 3.66
- Strikeouts: 10
- Stats at Baseball Reference

Teams
- Philadelphia Phillies (2015); Miami Marlins (2016)

Nefi Ismael Ogando (born June 3, 1989) is a Dominican former professional baseball pitcher. He previously played in Major League Baseball (MLB) for the Philadelphia Phillies and Miami Marlins.

== Career ==
=== Boston Red Sox ===
Ogando signed as an international free agent with the Boston Red Sox.

=== Philadelphia Phillies ===
In 2013, the Red Sox traded Ogando to the Philadelphia Phillies for John McDonald. In 2014, Ogando pitched for the Reading Fightin' Phils of the Double-A Eastern League. The Phillies assigned Ogando to the Arizona Fall League, and he appeared in the league's all-star game. After the season, the Phillies added Ogando to their 40-man roster.

The Philles promoted Ogando to the major leagues in August, but optioned him back to the minor leagues without making an appearance.

Ogando made his major league debut on September 9 against the Atlanta Braves at Citizens Bank Park. He pitched an inning in relief of Dalier Hinojosa and gave up two runs on a bases-clearing triple by Michael Bourn.

=== Miami Marlins ===
After the 2015 season, the Miami Marlins claimed Ogando from the Phillies off of waivers. Ogando began the 2016 season with the New Orleans Zephyrs of the Triple–A Pacific Coast League, and promoted him to the major leagues on May 3.

On December 23, 2016, Ogando was claimed off waivers by the Pittsburgh Pirates. He was designated for assignment on February 10, 2017, following the acquisition of Phil Gosselin.

=== Cincinnati Reds ===
On February 14, 2017, Ogando was claimed off waivers by the Cincinnati Reds. He was placed on the disabled list to begin the season with a right hand strain. While on rehab assignment, Ogando was shut down after experiencing shoulder soreness. He was subsequently shifted to the 60-day disabled list on May 20. Ogando began a second rehab assignment in August with the rookie–level Arizona League Reds, and was shifted to the Double–A Pensacola Blue Wahoos later in the month. Upon being activated from the disabled list on August 26, Ogando was removed from the 40-man roster and sent outright to the Triple–A Louisville Bats. In 4 games for Louisville down the stretch, he logged a 4.15 ERA with 4 strikeouts across 4 1/3 innings of work. He elected free agency following the season on November 6.

=== Cleburne Railroaders ===
On February 8, 2019, Ogando signed with the Cleburne Railroaders of the American Association of Independent Professional Baseball for the season. He was released on January 20, 2020.

=== High Point Rockers ===
On April 1, 2021, Ogando signed with the High Point Rockers of the Atlantic League of Professional Baseball. In 15 relief appearances, Ogando posted a 1–2 record with a 8.53 ERA and 8 strikeouts. He was released on August 3.
