= Jerad Eickhoff =

American baseball player (born 1990)

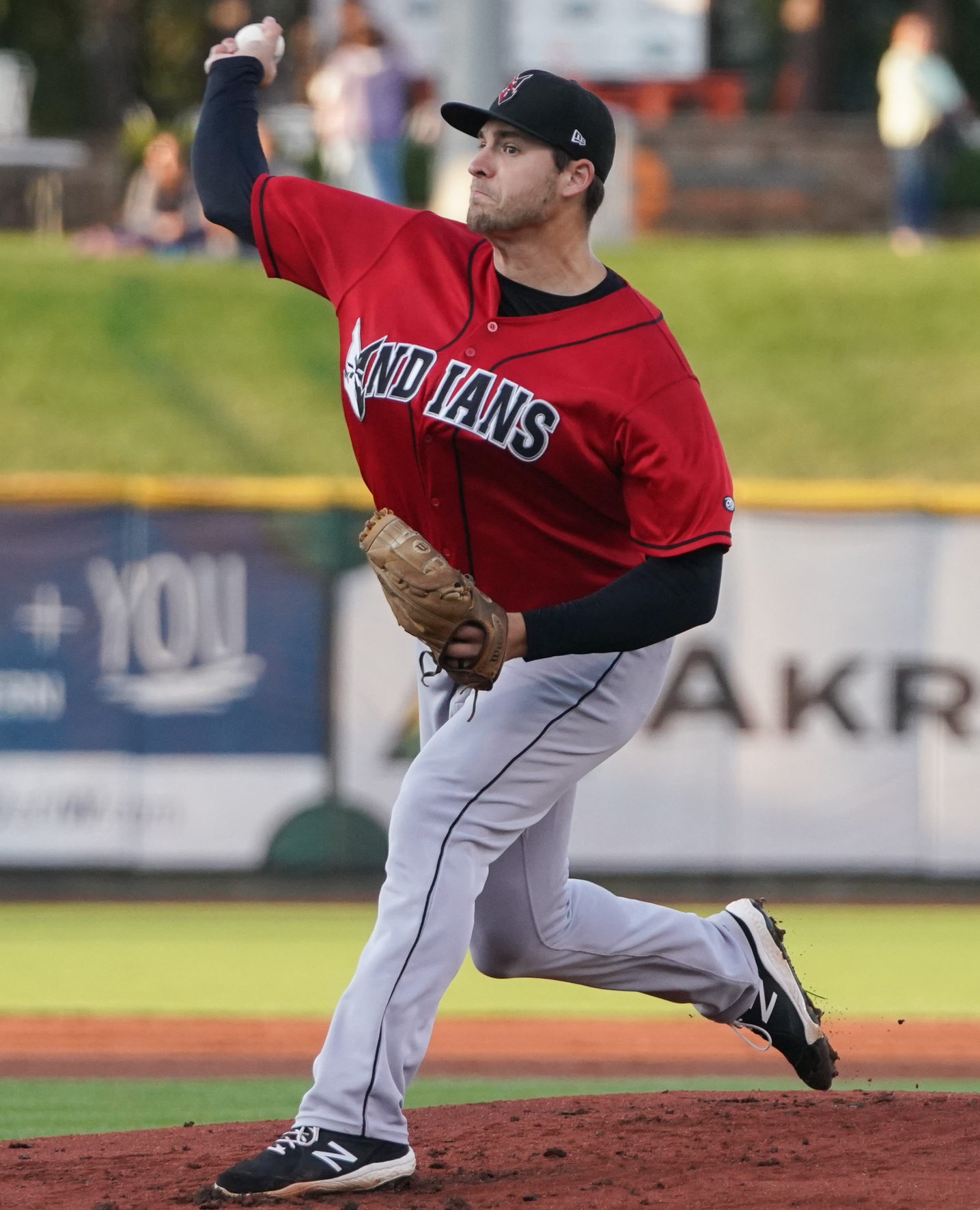
- Eickhoff with the Indianapolis Indians in 2022
- Pitcher
- Born: July 2, 1990 (age 36); Evansville, Indiana, U.S.
- Batted: Right Threw: Right

MLB debut
- August 21, 2015, for the Philadelphia Phillies

Last MLB appearance
- June 22, 2022, for the Pittsburgh Pirates

MLB statistics
- Win–loss record: 21–33
- Earned run average: 4.50
- Strikeouts: 413
- Stats at Baseball Reference

Teams
- Philadelphia Phillies (2015–2019); New York Mets (2021); Pittsburgh Pirates (2022)

Jerad Joseph Eickhoff (/ˈaɪkɒf/ EYE-kof; born July 2, 1990) is an American former professional baseball pitcher. He played in Major League Baseball (MLB) for the Philadelphia Phillies, New York Mets and Pittsburgh Pirates. Eickhoff was drafted by the Texas Rangers in the 15th round (474th overall) of the 2011 Major League Baseball draft. In July 2015, the Rangers traded him to the Phillies, with whom he made his big league debut in 2015.

== Early life ==
Eickhoff was born on July 2, 1990, in Evansville, Indiana. His father, Ron, was a local carpenter who would help Eickhoff and his brothers, Jonathan and Jordan, practice baseball in their backyard. His mother DeeDee, meanwhile, drove Eickhoff and his brothers to baseball games and tournaments throughout their childhood. Growing up, Eickhoff was a supporter of the St. Louis Cardinals of Major League Baseball (MLB), and frequently attended games at Busch Memorial Stadium.

Eickhoff played baseball and basketball at Mater Dei High School in Indiana. He was primarily a third baseman, and only began pitching during his junior year. Eickhoff went mostly unnoticed by scouts and college recruiters until October 2008, where, as a senior with his fall travel team, Eickhoff pitched seven strong innings at the World Wood Bat Association (WWBA) National Championships. Eickhoff would eventually become the second Mater Dei alumnus to play in MLB, following Rob Maurer.

== College career ==
Following his WWBA performance, Eickhoff received offers from baseball programs at schools like Michigan State and Indiana University, but many of those programs wanted him to play as a walk-on pitcher. A scout for the Baltimore Orioles suggested that Eickhoff attend a junior college, where he was more likely to receive playing time. Eickhoff ultimately committed to play college baseball as a pitcher for Olney Central College in Olney, Illinois. After his freshman season, the Chicago Cubs selected Eickhoff in the 46th round of the 2010 MLB draft. He declined to sign with the team, choosing instead to return to Olney. That year, Eickhoff played collegiate summer baseball with the Wisconsin Woodchucks of the Northwoods League. He made 16 appearances with the Woodchucks, posting a 3–2 win–loss record and a 6.69 earned run average (ERA), while striking out 35 batters in 39 innings pitched.

As a sophomore in 2011, Eickhoff continued to grow as a player, with his pitch velocity reaching up to 95 mph (153 km/h). He posted a 10–4 record and a 1.90 ERA for the year, enough to win the title of Great Rivers Athletic Conference Pitcher of the Year. He also set a school record with 116 strikeouts in 88 2/3 innings, while walking only 27. After the season, Eickhoff committed to Western Kentucky University.

== Professional career ==
=== Texas Rangers ===
The Texas Rangers selected Eickhoff in the 15th round, with the 474th overall selection, of the 2011 Major League Baseball draft. He agreed to nullify his National Letter of Intent with Western Kentucky in order to sign with the Rangers. He was initially assigned to the rookie–level Arizona League Rangers, but was promoted to the Low–A Spokane Indians of the Northwest League after only four games. In 14 appearances between Arizona and Spokane, Eickhoff was 1–2 in his rookie season, with a 2.37 ERA and 22 strikeouts in 19 innings pitched.

In 2012, Eickhoff pitched for the Single–A Hickory Crawdads of the South Atlantic League. He was 13–7 with a 4.69 ERA — his 13 wins were third in the league and matched the 2nd-highest single-season win total in team history.

Eickhoff started 2013 with the High–A Myrtle Beach Pelicans of the Carolina League, and was promoted to the Double–A Frisco RoughRiders of the Texas League during the season. He had the 3rd-lowest WHIP (1.17) and the 8th–lowest ERA (3.41) in the Carolina League, and his 11 wild pitches were 6th in the league.

Eickhoff returned to Frisco in 2014, where he was named Pitcher of the Week, on May 5. Eickhoff's 144 strikeouts and 12 wild pitches with Frisco led the Texas League, and his 1.17 WHIP was 4th-best in the league.

On November 20, 2024, Eickhoff had his contract selected to the major league roster to protect him from the Rule 5 draft.

In 2015, between Frisco, the Triple–A Round Rock Express, and the Lehigh Valley IronPigs, Eickhoff was 12–5, with a 3.85 ERA, and 126 strikeouts, in 133 1/3 innings.

=== Philadelphia Phillies ===
On July 31, 2015, the Rangers traded Eickhoff, Nick Williams, Matt Harrison, Jake Thompson, Alec Asher, and Jorge Alfaro to the Philadelphia Phillies for Cole Hamels and Jake Diekman. He made his major league debut for the Phillies on August 21. Eickhoff's 2015 big league pitching totals included a 3-3 win–loss record with a 2.65 ERA, while he struck out 49 batters in 51 innings pitched.

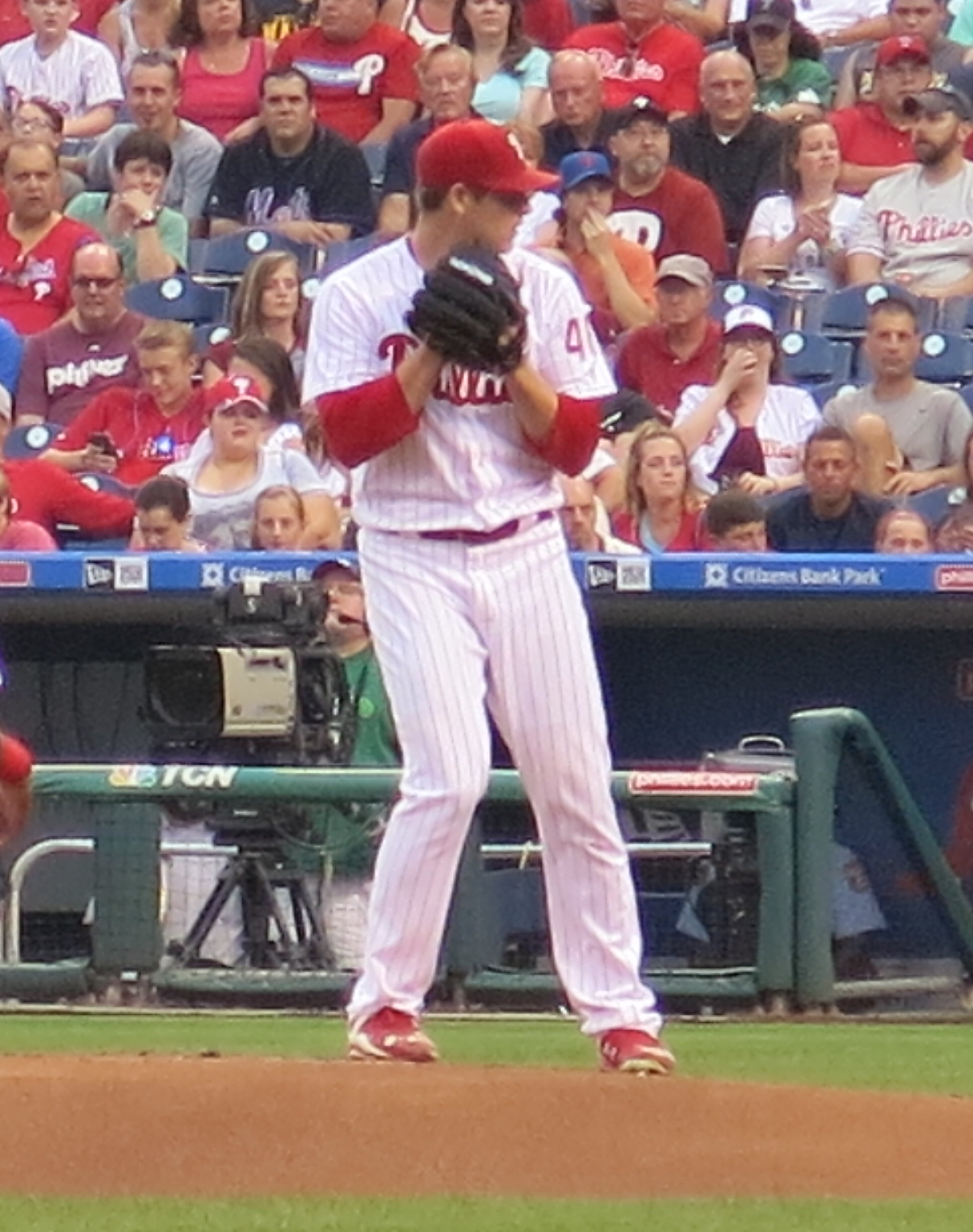
Eickhoff with the Phillies in 2016

In 2016 (his first full season with the Phillies), Eickhoff was 11–14, with a 3.65 ERA, gave up 1.92 walks per 9 innings pitched (4th in the National League), had 20 quality starts (tied for 6th), struck out 167 batters in 197 1/3 innings (8th), and had a strikeout-to-walk ratio of 3.976 (9th).

In 2017, Eickhoff was 4–8, with a 4.71 ERA, and struck out 118 batters, in 128 innings. He held opposing hitters to a .218 batting average with runners in scoring position, the 6th-lowest average among NL pitchers. In 2017, with the Double–A Reading Fightin Phils he was 0–1 with a 1.80 ERA in one start. Eickhoff missed the end of the 2017 season because he was experiencing numbness in his fingers.

In 2018, Eickhoff was 0–1, with a 6.75 ERA, and struck out 11 batters in 5 1/3 innings. In a game on September 28, against Atlanta, he tied a Phillies franchise record shared by Steve Carlton in 1981 and Curt Schilling in 1996 (later broken by Aaron Nola in 2021) by striking out seven consecutive batters at one point. Eickhoff missed most of the season due to a strained back muscle, followed by a return of the numbness in his fingers, which caused him to be put on the disabled list. He met with a number of specialists during the summer to evaluate nerve damage that was leading to the numbness, twinges, and tingling in the fingers of his right hand, especially when he threw his curveball; their diagnoses ranged from thoracic outlet syndrome (which was ruled out) to carpal tunnel syndrome, and Eickhoff was given two cortisone shots. In 2018, with the High–A Clearwater Threshers, Reading, and the Triple–A Lehigh Valley IronPigs, he was 0–1 with a 2.90 in eight starts. In the off–season he signed a one–year contract for $975,000.

In 2019 with the Phillies he was 3–4 with one save and a 5.71 ERA, and struck out 51 batters in 58 1/3 innings. In 2019, with Clearwater, Reading, and Lehigh Valley, he was 3–2 with a 5.93 ERA and 24 strikeouts in eight starts. Eickhoff ended the season on the injured list, first with right biceps tendinitis and then with a blister/laceration on his right middle finger. On November 4, he was sent outright off the 40-man roster and elected free agency.

=== San Diego Padres ===
On December 27, 2019, Eickhoff signed a minor league deal with the San Diego Padres. On August 2, 2020, Eickhoff's contract was selected to the active roster. The next day he was optioned down and he was outrighted off of the roster on August 24, without making a major league appearance. He elected free agency on August 26.

=== Texas Rangers (second stint) ===
On August 30, 2020, Eickhoff signed a minor league contract with the Texas Rangers. He did not play in a game with the Rangers organization due to the cancellation of the minor league season because of the COVID-19 pandemic. He became a free agent on November 2.

=== New York Mets ===
On December 21, 2020, Eickhoff signed a minor league contract with the New York Mets organization. He was assigned to the Triple-A Syracuse Mets to begin the year. On June 20, Eickhoff was selected to the active roster. After posting a 4.50 ERA in 2 starts for the Mets, Eickhoff was designated for assignment on June 29. He was outrighted to Syracuse on July 3. However, Eickhoff rejected the assignment and elected free agency. Eickhoff re-signed with the Mets on a minor league contract on July 5. On July 11, Eickhoff was re-selected to the active roster. Eickhoff allowed 4 runs in 6 1/3 innings of work before he was designated for assignment a second time on July 20. Eickhoff elected free agency for a second time on July 24. Eickhoff again re-signed with the Mets organization on a minor league contract. On July 27, Eickhoff was added to the team's major league roster for a third time. That day, Eickhoff took the loss after giving up 10 runs in his start against the Atlanta Braves, and was designated for assignment yet again the following day. On October 6, 2021, Eickhoff elected free agency.

=== Pittsburgh Pirates ===
On November 28, 2021, Eickhoff signed a minor league contract with the Pittsburgh Pirates. He was assigned to the Triple-A Indianapolis Indians to begin the season.

On June 22, 2022, Eickhoff was selected to the 40-man and active rosters. In his only appearance, a start against the Chicago Cubs, he was shelled for 10 runs on 10 hits in 4 1/3 innings of work. He made history as the first Pirate to allow 10 runs in their first start with the squad. He also became the first pitcher to allow 10 runs in back-to-back starts since Chubby Dean of the Philadelphia Athletics in 1940. Eickhoff was designated for assignment on June 24. He cleared waivers and was sent outright to Triple-A Indianapolis on June 27. In 28 games (20 starts) for Indianapolis, he posted a 6–7 record and 4.96 ERA with 107 strikeouts in 114 1/3 innings pitched. He elected free agency on October 6.

=== Lexington Counter Clocks ===
On April 13, 2023, Eickhoff signed with the Lexington Counter Clocks of the Atlantic League of Professional Baseball. In 9 starts for Lexington, Eickhoff struggled to a 3–4 record and 6.16 ERA with 40 strikeouts in 49 2/3 innings pitched.

=== Cleveland Guardians ===
On June 20, 2023, Eickhoff had his contract purchased by the Cleveland Guardians organization. In 14 games (13 starts) for the Triple–A Columbus Clippers, he struggled to a 1–7 record and 6.92 ERA with 41 strikeouts across 67 2/3 innings pitched. Eickhoff elected free agency following the season on November 6.

== Coaching career ==
On January 15, 2024, Eickhoff was named the pitching coach for the Miami Marlins' Double–A affiliate, the Pensacola Blue Wahoos. On February 13, 2026, Eickhoff was promoted to serve as the pitching coach for the Jacksonville Jumbo Shrimp, Miami's Triple-A affiliate.
