= Alec Asher =

American baseball player (born 1991)

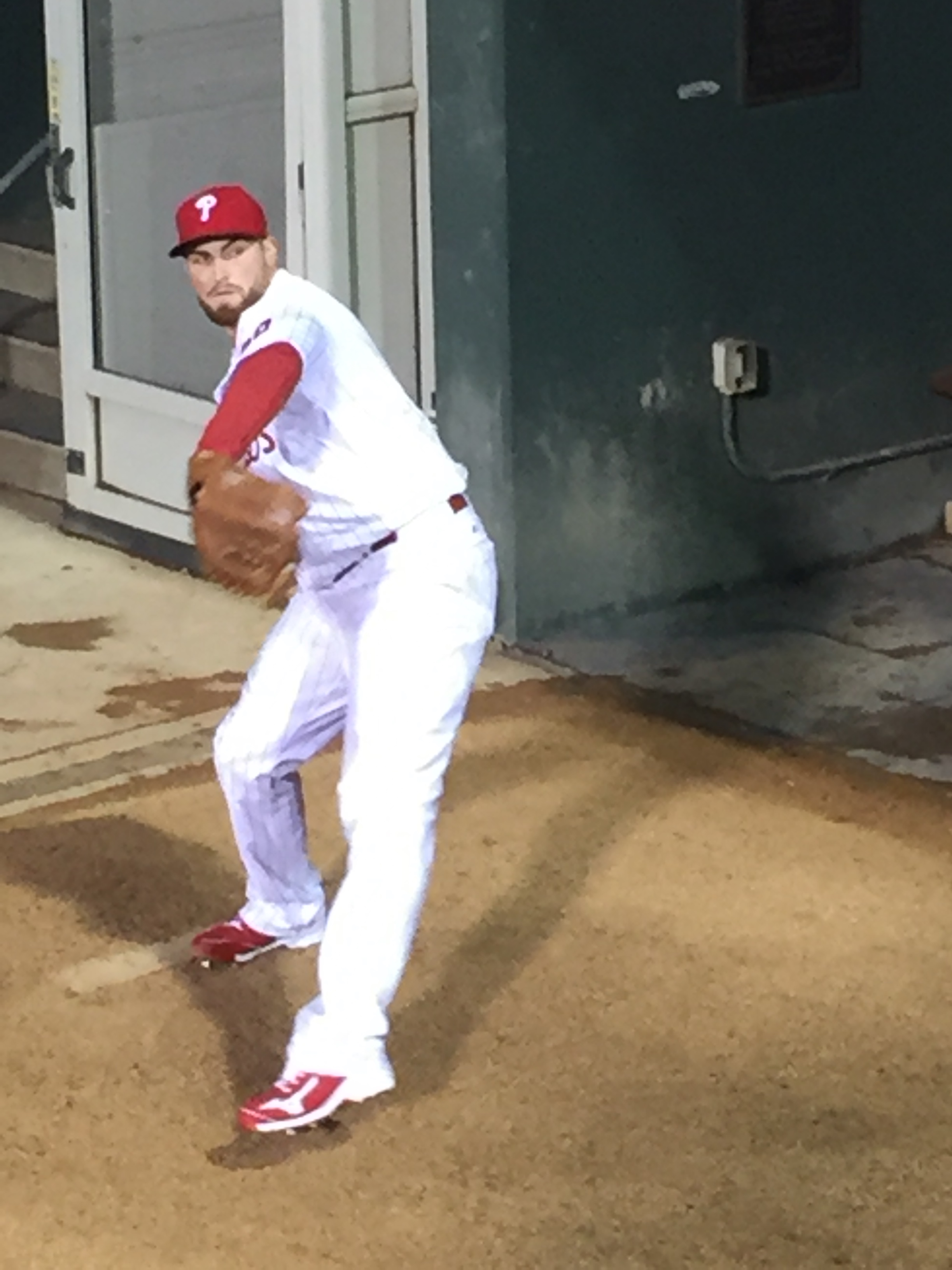
- Asher with the Philadelphia Phillies in 2015
- Pitcher
- Born: October 4, 1991 (age 35); Lakeland, Florida, U.S.
- Batted: Right Threw: Right

MLB debut
- August 30, 2015, for the Philadelphia Phillies

Last MLB appearance
- July 12, 2018, for the Milwaukee Brewers

MLB statistics
- Win–loss record: 4–12
- Earned run average: 5.42
- Strikeouts: 78
- Stats at Baseball Reference

Teams
- Philadelphia Phillies (2015–2016); Baltimore Orioles (2017); Milwaukee Brewers (2018)

Alec Edward Asher (born October 4, 1991) is an American former professional baseball pitcher. He played in Major League Baseball (MLB) for the Philadelphia Phillies, Baltimore Orioles, and Milwaukee Brewers, and in the Chinese Professional Baseball League (CPBL) for the Uni-President Lions.

== Playing career ==
Asher had Tommy John surgery when he was 14 years old. He attended McKeel Academy of Technology through his sophomore year of high school. He then transferred to Charlotte High School during his Junior year, but later went on to graduate from Lakeland Senior High School.

Asher was drafted by the San Francisco Giants in the 23rd round of the 2010 Major League Baseball draft out of high school. He had agreed to an $80,000 signing bonus with the Giants; however the team decided not to sign Asher after a bone spur was revealed in his physical. He attended Santa Fe College for a year before transferring to Polk Community College.

=== Texas Rangers ===
The Texas Rangers selected Asher in the fourth round of the 2012 Major League Baseball (MLB) draft. He made his professional debut for the Spokane Indians that year. He pitched in 20 games as a relief pitcher, finishing with a 3.09 earned run average (ERA), five saves and 50 strikeouts over 35 innings.

In 2013, Asher was a starting pitcher for the Myrtle Beach Pelicans. He appeared in 26 games with 25 starts and went 9–7 with a 2.90 ERA and 139 strikeouts over 133 1/3 innings.

=== Philadelphia Phillies ===
On July 31, 2015, Asher was traded to the Philadelphia Phillies along with Nick Williams, Jorge Alfaro, Jake Thompson, Matt Harrison, and Jerad Eickhoff in exchange for Cole Hamels and Jake Diekman. He made his major league debut on August 30. Asher made seven starts for Philadelphia during his rookie campaign, but struggled to an 0-6 record and 9.31 ERA with 16 strikeouts over 29 innings of work.

On June 16, 2016, Asher was suspended for 80 games for violating MLB's drug policy after testing positive for chlorodehydromethyltestosterone. He would make five starts for the Phillies during the regular season, with a 2–1 record , 2.28 ERA, and 13 strikeouts over 27 2/3 innings of work.

=== Baltimore Orioles ===
Asher was traded to the Baltimore Orioles for a player to be named later on March 28, 2017. He made his season debut on April 15 against the Toronto Blue Jays, he tossing 6 1/3 innings, giving up just one run while striking out five. He earned a no decision in a 2–1 Orioles' loss. Asher earned his first win of the year on April 26 against the Tampa Bay Rays. Out of the bullpen, Asher gave up a run in the 11th inning, before the Orioles would score two in the bottom half to win 5–4. Asher made 24 total appearances (including six starts) for Baltimore, posting a 2–5 record, 5.25 ERA, and 47 strikeouts across 60 innings pitched.

Asher was designated for assignment on March 29, 2018, after the Orioles added players to their Opening Day roster.

=== Los Angeles Dodgers ===
Asher was claimed off waivers by the Los Angeles Dodgers on April 5, 2018. He made one start for the Triple-A Oklahoma City Dodgers, allowing two runs (one earned) on three hits with one strikeout over three innings pitched.

=== Milwaukee Brewers ===
On April 17, 2018, Asher was claimed off of waivers by the Milwaukee Brewers. The Brewers designated him for assignment two days later, following the acquisition of Tyler Saladino. Asher cleared waivers and was sent outright to the Triple-A Colorado Springs Sky Sox on April 23. On May 12, the Brewers selected Asher's contract, adding him to their active roster. He made two scoreless appearances for Milwaukee, recording two strikeouts over three innings. On August 14, Asher was designated for assignment by the Brewers after they acquired Jake Thompson. Asher cleared waivers and was sent outright to Colorado Springs on August 17. He elected free agency on October 23.

=== Atlantic League ===
On January 26, 2019, Asher signed a minor league contract with the Colorado Rockies. He was released by the Rockies prior to the start of the regular season on March 14.

On April 15, Asher signed with the Sugar Land Skeeters of the Atlantic League of Professional Baseball. He made two appearances for Sugar Land, registering a 1–0 record and 9.00 ERA with three strikeouts over three innings of relief. Asher was released by the Skeeters on May 2.

On May 13, Asher signed with the Long Island Ducks of the Atlantic League. In seven appearances (six starts) for the Ducks, Asher had a 3–1 record, 3.12 ERA, and 21 strikeouts across 34 2/3 innings pitched.

=== Uni-President Lions ===
On June 19, 2019, Asher's contract was purchased by the Uni-President Lions of the Chinese Professional Baseball League. Asher made 15 appearances (including nine starts) for the Lions, logging a 1–6 record and 4.29 ERA with 43 strikeouts and two saves across 56 2/3 innings pitched.

=== Minnesota Twins ===
On January 28, 2020, Asher signed a minor league contract with the Minnesota Twins. Asher did not play in a game in 2020 due to the cancellation of the minor league season because of the COVID-19 pandemic. He became a free agent on November 2.

== Coaching career ==
On September 8, 2023, Asher was hired as the pitching coach for the baseball team at Polk State College.

== See also ==
- List of Major League Baseball players suspended for performance-enhancing drugs
