= Elvis Araújo =

Venezuelan baseball player (born 1991)

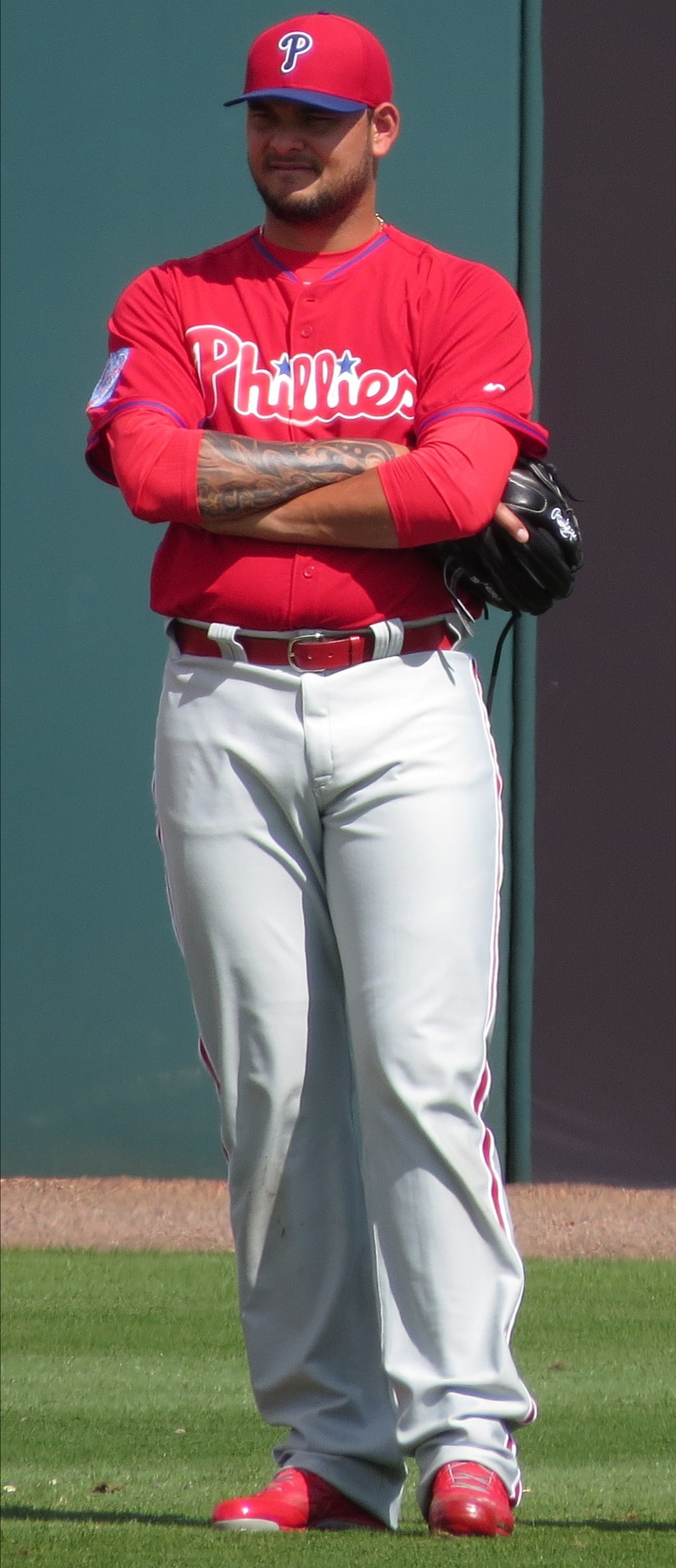
- Araújo in 2015 spring training

Free agent
- Pitcher
- Born: July 15, 1991 (age 35); Maracaibo, Venezuela
- Bats: Left Throws: Left

Professional debut
- MLB: May 5, 2015, for the Philadelphia Phillies
- NPB: May 9, 2017, for the Chunichi Dragons

MLB statistics (through 2016 season)
- Win–loss record: 4–2
- Earned run average: 4.35
- Strikeouts: 63

NPB statistics (through 2017 season)
- Win–loss record: 1–0
- Earned run average: 6.48
- Strikeouts: 6
- Stats at Baseball Reference

Teams
- Philadelphia Phillies (2015–2016); Chunichi Dragons (2017)

Elvis Alejandro Araújo (born July 15, 1991) is a Venezuelan professional baseball pitcher who is a free agent. He has previously played in Major League Baseball (MLB) for the Philadelphia Phillies, and in Nippon Professional Baseball (NPB) for the Chunichi Dragons.

== Career ==
=== Cleveland Indians ===
Araújo signed as an international free agent with the Cleveland Indians in 2007. Araujo made his professional debut in 2008 for the DSL Indians. Araujo did not appear in a professional game until 2011 when he appeared for the AZL Indians. He spent the 2012 season in Single-A with the Lake County Captains, pitching to a 7–10 record and 5.00 ERA in 28 innings. Araujo only appeared in 2 game in 2013, both with the High-A Carolina Mudcats, and allowed 8 runs in 9 2/3 innings. He split 2014 with the Double-A Akron RubberDucks and Carolina, accumulating a 2–1 record and 3.42 ERA in 43 games.

=== Philadelphia Phillies ===
The Phillies signed Araujo to a major league contract on November 13, 2014.

Araújo was promoted to the major leagues on May 2, 2015, making his debut on May 5. He earned his first career victory on May 15. While pitching only 1/3 of an inning, striking out the Arizona Diamondbacks' David Peralta to shut down the 7th inning for the Phillies defense, he was the pitcher of record when the Phillies regained the lead in the next half-inning. Araujo suffered a strained left groin late in the 2015 season and was placed on the 60-day disabled list. He had recorded a 3.38 ERA in 40 appearances up to that point. In 2016 for Philadelphia, Araujo made 32 appearances, but struggled to a 5.60 ERA in 27 1/3 innings.

=== Miami Marlins ===
On November 18, 2016, Araújo was claimed off waivers by the Miami Marlins. He was designated for assignment on December 23. and subsequently was released on January 5, 2017.

=== Chunichi Dragons ===
Following his release from the Marlins organization, Araújo signed with the Chunichi Dragons in Japan's Nippon Professional Baseball. Araujo made 6 appearances for Chunichi in 2017, recording a 6.48 ERA with 6 strikeouts.

=== Baltimore Orioles ===
On February 6, 2018, Araújo signed a minor league contract with the Baltimore Orioles organization. Araujo struggled to a 5.85 ERA with the High-A Frederick Keys before being released on July 26, 2018.

=== Miami Marlins (second stint) ===
On February 18, 2019, Araújo signed a minor league contract with the Miami Marlins. He was released on June 20, 2019, after stumbling to a 7.64 ERA with the Double-A Jacksonville Jumbo Shrimp.

=== Sultanes de Monterrey ===
On May 29, 2021, Araújo signed with the Sultanes de Monterrey of the Mexican League. He made 16 appearances (12 starts) for the club, registering a 4–2 record and 4.14 ERA with 68 strikeouts across 63 innings pitched. Araújo was released by the team on March 17, 2022.

=== Mariachis de Guadalajara ===
On May 11, 2022, Araújo signed with the Mariachis de Guadalajara. In 8 starts, Araújo posted a 1–2 record with a 6.90 ERA. He was waived on June 21.

=== Sultanes de Monterrey (second stint) ===
On June 24, 2022, Araújo was claimed off waivers by the Sultanes de Monterrey. In 3 starts, Araújo registered a 1–0 record with a 4.22 ERA. He was waived on July 14.

=== Bravos de León ===
The same day he was waived by Monterrey, Araújo was claimed off waivers by the Bravos de León. In 6 games for León, he struggled to a 6.75 ERA with 22 strikeouts across 20 innings of work. Araújo was later released on December 6, 2022.

=== Tigres de Quintana Roo ===
On January 11, 2024, Araújo signed with the Leones de Yucatán of the Mexican League. However, prior to the season on April 7, Araújo was released by Yucatán.

On April 11, 2024, Araújo signed with the Tigres de Quintana Roo of the Mexican League. In seven starts, he posted a 2–2 record with a 6.16 ERA and 34 strikeouts over 30 2/3 innings. On May 23, Araújo was released by Quintana Roo.

=== El Águila de Veracruz ===
On July 5, 2024, Araújo signed with El Águila de Veracruz of the Mexican League. In 4 games (3 starts) for Veracruz, He logged a 2–0 record and 2.79 ERA with 8 strikeouts across19 1/3 innings pitched. Araújo was released by Veracruz on January 20, 2025.

=== Centauros de La Guaira ===
On February 18, 2025, Araujo signed with the Centauros de La Guaira of the Venezuelan Major League. He became a free agent following the season.

== See also ==
- List of Major League Baseball players from Venezuela
