= Dalier Hinojosa =

Cuban baseball player (born 1986)

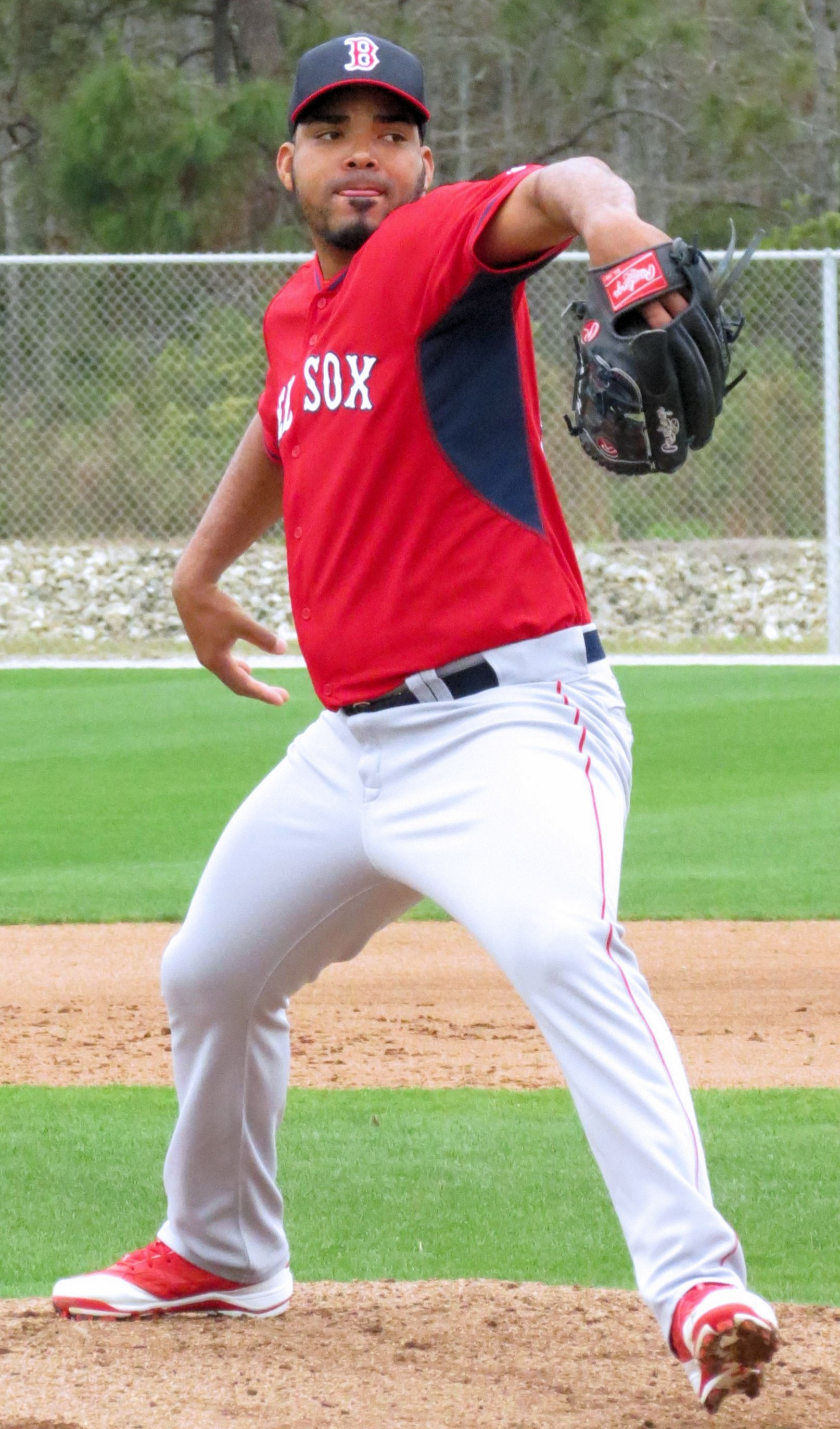
- Hinojosa pitching for the Boston Red Sox in 2015 spring training
- Pitcher
- Born: February 10, 1986 (age 40); Isla de la Juventud, Cuba
- Batted: Right Threw: Right

MLB debut
- May 3, 2015, for the Boston Red Sox

Last MLB appearance
- April 28, 2016, for the Philadelphia Phillies

Career statistics
- Win–loss record: 2–1
- Earned run average: 1.51
- Strikeouts: 31
- Stats at Baseball Reference

Teams
- Boston Red Sox (2015); Philadelphia Phillies (2015–2016)
Medals
Men's baseball
Representing Cuba
Pan American Games
Bronze medal – third place	2011 Guadalajara	Team competition

Dalier Hinojosa Hernández [dahl-yair' / eeno-hoe'-sah] (born February 10, 1986) is a Cuban former professional baseball pitcher. Hinojosa pitched for the Indios de Guantánamo of the Cuban National Series and for the Cuban national baseball team before he defected from Cuba in 2012. Hinojosa then played in Major League Baseball (MLB) for the Boston Red Sox and Philadelphia Phillies.

== Cuban career ==
Hinojosa played for the Indios de Guantánamo of the Cuban National Series from 2005 through 2012. As a 19-year-old rookie, he posted a 2–6 record with a 6.25 earned run average for Guantánamo in the 2005–2006 season. He then went 4–7 with a 4.83 ERA in 2006–2007, followed with a 1–2 mark and a 6.44 ERA in 2007–2008.

Hinojosa improved to 7–4 with a 3.61 ERA in 2008–2009, which included one shutout and 48 strikeouts in 87 innings, while tying for sixth in the Cuban Series with four complete games. After that, he was 9–6 with a 4.07 ERA in 2009–2010, ending fourth in the league with 99 strikeouts, trailing only Vladimir García, Odrisamer Despaigne and Yulieski González. Besides, he posted career numbers in starts (18) and innings pitched (126), while tying for the lead with six complete games, even with Maikel Folch, Norberto González, Fidel Romero, and the aforementioned González.

In the 2010 World University Baseball Championship, Hinojosa threw a seven-inning mercy rule perfect game against the Sri Lanka squad, striking out 16 in the process. In his only other appearance in the event, he walked the two batters he faced. Cuba went on to take the gold medal. Besides, he played for Cuba in the 2010 Pan American Games Qualifying Tournament, as the team won spots in both the 2011 Baseball World Cup and 2011 Pan American Games. He then threw another mercy rule perfecto against a third-rate Asian power, blanking the Hong Kong national team in a five-inning perfect game at the 2010 Intercontinental Cup.

Hinojosa followed with two strong seasons in Cuba, going 8–4 with a 3.56 ERA in 2010–2011 and 9–7, 3.40 in 2011–2012. He only made two appearances in 2012–2013, ending 1–1 with a 5.40 ERA in just 8 1/3 innings. He defected from Cuba in February 2013 and petitioned Major League Baseball to become a free agent.

== Major League Baseball career ==
=== Boston Red Sox ===
Hinojosa was declared a free agent in July 2013, and he signed with the Boston Red Sox to a Minor League deal worth $4.25 million in 2013. The Red Sox invited Hinojosa to spring training in 2014 and started the regular season with the Pawtucket Red Sox of the Triple-A International League.

Hinojosa made 41 relief appearances at Pawtucket, and despite struggling early, he turned his year around by posting a 1.57 ERA in his final 23 innings of work. Overall, he finished with a 3–5 record and a 3.79 ERA in 61 2/3 of work. He opened 2015 at Pawtucket, where he went 1–0 with a 3.68 ERA (3 ER/7 1/3 IP) and nine strikeouts in four games before being promoted to the Red Sox on April 29.

Hinojosa made his majors debut on May 3, 2015, at Fenway Park in an 8–5 loss to the New York Yankees. He would go on to thread 1 2/3 scoreless innings of relief and did not allow a hit, issuing three base on balls and hitting one batter, while striking out Alex Rodriguez on four pitches and Chris Young looking on three.

After the game, Hinojosa was optioned back to Pawtucket in order to make room on the 25-man roster for infielder Luis Jiménez and then was designated for assignment on July 11, when the Red Sox made room for Brian Johnson on their 40-man roster.

=== Philadelphia Phillies ===
Hinojosa was claimed off waivers by the Philadelphia Phillies on July 15, 2015. After playing 2 weeks with the Triple-A Lehigh Valley IronPigs, he was recalled to the majors on July 31 making his National League debut the same day.

On April 28, 2016, in his last MLB appearance against the Washington Nationals, Hinojosa suffered an injury to his pitching hand after nationals center fielder, Matt den Dekker hit a line drive to the mound during the 8th inning. Hinojosa exited the game and was sent onto the disabled list for rehabilitation. He later missed the remainder of the season with a persistent shoulder injury. On October 7, Hinojosa was removed from the 40-man roster and sent outright to Triple-A Lehigh Valley. He was released from his minor league contract on May 17, 2017.

On March 1, 2018, Hinojosa announced his retirement from professional baseball.

== See also ==
- List of baseball players who defected from Cuba
