= Jerome Williams (baseball) =

American baseball player (born 1981)

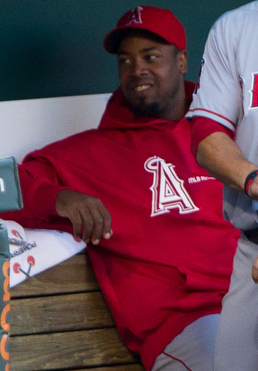
- Williams with the Los Angeles Angels of Anaheim in 2012

Yuba-Sutter High Wheelers
- Pitcher
- Born: December 4, 1981 (age 44); Honolulu, Hawaii, U.S.
- Batted: Right Threw: Right

Professional debut
- MLB: April 26, 2003, for the San Francisco Giants
- CPBL: March 21, 2010, for the Uni-President Lions

Last appearance
- MLB: September 26, 2016, for the St. Louis Cardinals
- CPBL: October 3, 2010, for the Uni-President Lions

MLB statistics
- Win–loss record: 52–66
- Earned run average: 4.59
- Strikeouts: 655

CPBL statistics
- Win–loss record: 7–9
- Earned run average: 3.11
- Strikeouts: 76
- Stats at Baseball Reference

Teams
- San Francisco Giants (2003–2005); Chicago Cubs (2005–2006); Washington Nationals (2007); Uni-President Lions (2010); Los Angeles Angels of Anaheim (2011–2013); Houston Astros (2014); Texas Rangers (2014); Philadelphia Phillies (2014–2015); St. Louis Cardinals (2016)

Jerome Lee Williams (born December 4, 1981) is an American former professional baseball pitcher who played 13 seasons in Major League Baseball (MLB) from 2003 to 2016. He played in Major League Baseball (MLB) for the San Francisco Giants, Chicago Cubs, Washington Nationals, Los Angeles Angels of Anaheim, Houston Astros, Texas Rangers, Philadelphia Phillies and St. Louis Cardinals, and in the Chinese Professional Baseball League (CPBL) for the Uni-President Lions.

== Career ==
=== San Francisco Giants ===
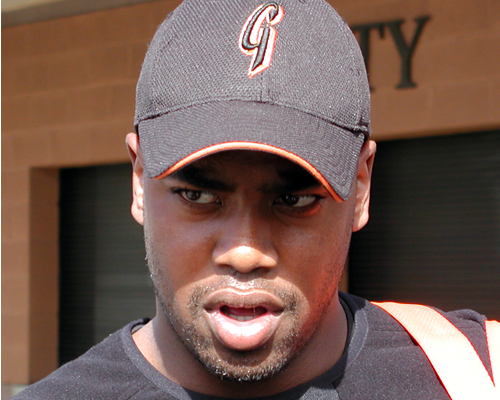
Williams during his tenure with the San Francisco Giants in 2005 spring training.

Williams was the San Francisco Giants first-round draft pick in the 1999 Major League Baseball draft, the 39th overall selection. He spent 4 1/2 years in the minors, compiling a record of 27–26 before being called up in 2003. He was a regular starter in the Giants rotation in 2003–2004, going 7–5 with a 3.30 ERA in 2003.

In 2004, Williams started 22 games for the Giants, recording 10 wins with a 4.24 ERA.

In 2005, Williams started 3 games for the Giants before being traded to the Cubs.

=== Chicago Cubs ===
He was acquired by the Chicago Cubs along with David Aardsma for LaTroy Hawkins during the 2005 season. In Williams' Cubs debut, he pitched 7 innings, giving up 2 runs and striking out six Milwaukee Brewers players, and ended up going 6–8 for the Cubs. Williams, however, played most of 2006 with the Cubs' Triple-A affiliate, the Iowa Cubs, appearing only in 5 games for the Cubs.

=== Washington Nationals ===
On January 12, 2007, Williams was signed by the Washington Nationals organization and in spring training earned a slot in the Nationals starting rotation.

Williams had a rough April for the Nationals, his ERA ballooning to 7.77 before he pitched a brilliant game at the end of the month, pitching six innings of one-hit shut-out ball against the New York Mets. But he sprained his left ankle sliding into second base, and landed on the 15-day disabled list. He came back on May 15, lasting only two innings, allowing five runs on seven hits, and leaving with a rotator-cuff injury. His rehabilitation in the minors did not go well, and after 14 appearances with Double-A Harrisburg, in which he compiled a 9.08 ERA, on August 5, he was released.

=== Minnesota Twins ===
On August 8, 2007, he signed a minor league contract with the Minnesota Twins.

Williams, however, struggled mightily with Rochester and in 8 games had an ERA of 9.00 and was let go after the season.

=== Long Beach Armada ===
In April 2008, he signed a contract with the Long Beach Armada of the Golden Baseball League.

=== Los Angeles Dodgers ===
On June 24, 2008, the Los Angeles Dodgers purchased his contract and he played in their minor league system through the end of the season.

=== Oakland Athletics ===
At the end of the minor league season, September 5, 2008, Williams was waived by the Dodgers and then claimed by the Oakland Athletics. Williams did not play for Oakland and was not tendered a contract after the season, making him a free agent. He subsequently re-signed with Oakland and spent 2009 with their top farm club, the Sacramento River Cats of the Pacific Coast League.

=== Indios de Mayaguez and Uni–President Lions ===
Williams played winter baseball for the Indios de Mayaguez in Puerto Rico in 2008–09. He played for the Uni-President Lions of CPBL in Taiwan during 2010.

=== Los Angeles Angels of Anaheim ===
On June 16, 2011, Williams signed a minor league contract with the Los Angeles Angels of Anaheim. He was assigned to the Triple-A Salt Lake Bees. Williams had his contract purchased on August 16, after recording a 3.91 ERA in 11 games and 73 2/3 innings in Triple-A.

On August 21, 2011, Williams acquired his first major league win since 2005 in his first major league start since 2007. He finished the season with a 4–0 record in 10 games.

In June 2012, Williams had breathing problems and later collapsed in the clubhouse, forcing the Angels to place him on the disabled list. For the first time since his rookie year, Williams spent the whole season in the big leagues. He was a key asset for Anaheim out of the bullpen, being their long man/spot starter. Williams appeared in 32 games, and made 15 starts for the Angels. He compiled a 6–8 record with a 4.58 ERA.

In 2013, Williams made 25 starts for the Angels, appearing in 37 games overall. After recording a 9–10 record with a 4.57 ERA in 2013, Williams was non-tendered by the Angels, making him a free agent.

=== Houston Astros ===
On February 6, 2014, Williams signed a one-year contract with the Houston Astros. He was designated for assignment on July 1, 2014. He was released on July 8.

=== Texas Rangers ===
On July 11, 2014, Williams inked a minor league deal with the Texas Rangers. He was designated for assignment on August 8.

=== Philadelphia Phillies ===
On August 10, 2014, the Philadelphia Phillies claimed Williams off waivers. On September 20, Williams became the first pitcher in MLB history to defeat the same club with three different teams in the same season, defeating the Athletics with the Astros, Rangers, and Phillies. He signed a one-year contract to stay with the Phillies on October 21, 2014.

=== St. Louis Cardinals ===
On June 3, 2016, the St. Louis Cardinals signed Williams to Minor League contract. He was immediately added to the rotation of the Memphis Redbirds, their AAA team.

=== Somerset Patriots ===
On May 12, 2017, Williams signed with the Somerset Patriots of the Atlantic League of Professional Baseball. He became a free agent following the season. In 11 starts 47.2 innings he went 2-4 with a 4.91 ERA with 32 strikeouts and throwing 1 complete game.

=== Acereros de Monclova ===
On May 4, 2018, Williams signed with the Acereros de Monclova of the Mexican Baseball League. He was released on July 3. In 4 starts 22.2 innings he struggled going 2-2 with a 5.96 ERA with 8 strikeouts.

=== Retirement ===
Williams' retirement from baseball was confirmed on December 10, 2018.

== Coaching career ==
=== New York Mets ===
On March 8, 2021, Williams was announced as the pitching coach for the St. Lucie Mets, the Low-A affiliate of the New York Mets.

=== State College Spikes ===
On March 7, 2023, Williams was announced as the pitching coach for the State College Spikes, member of the MLB Draft League.

=== Yolo High Wheelers ===
On January 23, 2024, Williams was named the pitching coach for the Yolo High Wheelers of the Pioneer League for their inaugural season.

== Pitching style ==
He threw a sinker at 89–93 mph, a four-seam fastball at 90–94 mph, a cut fastball at 87–91 mph, a changeup from 83–86 mph, a slider at 78–83 mph, and a curveball at 70–75 mph.

== Personal life ==
Williams grew up in Waipahu, Hawaii and is a 1999 graduate of Waipahu High School.

He was well known for wearing a puka shell necklace at all times on the playing field, in honor of his mother Deborah, who died of breast cancer in 2001 while he was still a minor league pitcher. He stopped wearing it after a bad start in 2005, but resumed wearing it by spring training of 2007. He also sported a pink glove whenever he pitched, a symbol for the efforts of finding the cure for breast cancer.
