= X-mode =

X-mode may refer to:

- The extraordinary mode, an electromagnetic wave mode for propagation in a cold magnetoplasma
- X-Mode, a US data broker specialized in location data
- X-MODE, an AWD-system from Subaru, used in the Toyota bZ4X.

== See also ==
- Mode X, an alternative video graphics display mode of IBM VGA graphics hardware
