= Nathan Patterson =

Nathan Patterson may refer to:

- Nathan Patterson (baseball) (born 1996), American baseball player
- Nathan Patterson (footballer) (born 2001), Scottish footballer
