= Rob Friedman (baseball analyst) =

American baseball analyst and internet personality (born 1966)

- Education: University of North Carolina (B.A.); Emory Law School (J.D.)
- Known for: Baseball analyst, social media personality

Rob Friedman (born c. 1966), also known by the moniker PitchingNinja, is an American baseball analyst, social media personality and author. He is known for his pitching GIF and videos on Social media and for creating social media resources for baseball recruiting and scouting. He is an analyst for Major League Baseball, Peacock, Fox Sports, NESN and ESPN. A licensed attorney and former high school baseball coach, Friedman also founded the geolocation software company Digital Envoy. As of August 2026, his PitchingNinja accounts had over 575,000 followers on X (social network) account and over 710,000 followers on Instagram. The PitchingNinja account has been referred to as "one of baseball’s most famous social media accounts". Friedman also has approximately 325,000 subscribers on the PitchingNinja YouTube channel. He is the author of Unhittable: How Technology, Mavericks, and Innovators Engineered Baseball's New Era of Pitching Dominance.

== Major League Baseball dispute and resolution ==
In 2019, Friedman was briefly suspended from X (social network) (thenTwitter) by Major League Baseball and Twitter, due to a copyright dispute, but eventually was reinstated and hired as an analyst for Major League Baseball, in what was seen as a potential change for baseball's restrictive social media policy. Since Friedman's reinstatement, his work has been featured on MLB.com.

== Pitching analyst ==
Friedman creates pitching analysis videos and GIFs on Instagram,Twitter, YouTube and TikTok. He has been a pitching analyst for ESPN Sunday Night Baseball, Peacock (streaming service), ESPN College Baseball and Major League Baseball. An ESPN article previewing the 2019 Major League Baseball (MLB) postseason referred to certain pitchers as "PitchingNinja Bait", meaning: "A pitcher whose pitches are so unrepentantly sexy they are likely to be turned into GIFs by invaluable Twitterer, @pitchingninja."

During the 2019 season, he also contributed to a weekly segment for "Changeup" on DAZN with Cespedes Family BBQ featuring each week's MLB pitching highlights and also a weekly segment for ESPN Sunday Night Baseball.

Friedman's analysis has frequently been used by journalists and media outlets to help visually illustrate the pitches of major league pitchers. Additionally, Major League and Minor League pitchers have publicly credited him with helping them develop and refine their pitches. In 2020, Jake Diekman said Friedman helped him develop his slider through interactions on Twitter. Also, in 2020, at a postgame press conference, Yu Darvish said Friedman helped improve his slider by sharing grips with him. Cole Irvin said he learned his cutter from watching Corbin Burnes' interview with Friedman on Friedman's PitchingNinja YouTube Channel.

Friedman gave the nickname "Airbender" to Devin Williams' changeup, which was called baseball's most "absurd" pitch. At the time, some credited Friedman's coverage of Williams with helping him win the National League's Rookie of the Year Award.

Friedman's pitching analysis style has been described as "combin[ing] the knowledge of someone who studied pitching to help his young son improve with the wonderment of a fan who can’t help but plotz at how major leaguers are capable of manipulating a baseball".

Friedman was included in the Topps 2020 Allen And Ginter Baseball Card series due to his contributions to baseball as a pitching analyst.

Friedman's PitchingNinja Twitter account was recognized by ESPN as helping to drive change in baseball's culture by adding flair and individuality to the game, and was #30 on the "67 Things Baseball Fans Can Be Grateful for in 2020" in Sports Illustrated.

At the 2021 MLB All-Star Game, Friedman convinced Liam Hendriks to throw a knuckleball in exchange for a donation to charity, which was considered the sixth biggest All-Star moment. Trevor Bauer's Watch Momentum company sponsored Friedman's Pitching Ninja show on YouTube for a few months during the 2021 season, before Friedman and Momentum ended the sponsorship relationship in mid-2021. Friedman was awarded the "2020 Game Changer of the Year Award" from Lost Boyz Inc. for his support of their mission of helping inner-city youth through baseball.

For the 2022 season, Friedman joined the Peacock MLB team as lead Pitching Analyst on their broadcasts. He also was named MLB Pitching Analyst for Fox Sports. Friedman is a regular contributor to Fox Sports, writing about pitching, where he breaks down pitchers and their pitches, such as Shohei Ohtani and his new sinker. He is also the lead Pitching Analyst for FanDuel. Friedman's interview with Nolan Ryan was featured on the Blu-ray edition of the 2022 documentary "Facing Nolan".

In January 2024, MLB announced that it was officially adding a "sword" stat to Statcast in honor of PitchingNinja calling weak swings a "sword".

== Pitching Books ==
Friedman has written at least two books on pitching.

In 2025, he wrote a book analyzing Japanese pitchers including Yu Darvish, Yoshinobu Yamamoto and Shohei Ohtani. This book is available primarily in Japan.

In 2026, Friedman's book "Unhittable," which chronicled the advent of modern pitching, was reviewed in The Wall Street Journal by Will Leitch who called it "Pitch Perfect" and concluded: "Mr. Friedman is well-situated to explain how the sport has changed in the two decades since “Moneyball.” If you want to understand modern baseball, whether you like it or not, “Unhittable” is an instructive guide."

In August 2026, Friedman was featured in the author series at the National Baseball Hall of Fame and Museum.

== FlatGround ==
In January 2019, Friedman started the FlatGround app with a focus on pitchers getting recruited and scouted through social media. Friedman's FlatGround app account has been cited as a new development in baseball recruiting and scouting. FlatGround is followed by many MLB executives, which allows players to get free exposure.

Some of the professional pitchers who have publicly mentioned that Friedman and FlatGround have helped them get noticed by Major League affiliated organizations include: Justin Topa, Taylor Grover, Chris Dula, Chris Nunn, Nathan Patterson, Tyler Gillies, Casey Crosby, D. J. Snelten and Jordan Brink.

In August 2019, Nathan Patterson's signing received coverage by national publications, where Patterson mentioned that the exposure he received due to a viral video on FlatGround app and PitchingNinja assisted him in signing a professional contract with the Oakland Athletics. Patterson's signing has been referred to as Friedman's "most public success story."

Later, in 2022, Friedman's tweet of independent league pitcher Logan Sawyer was credited with helping get him signed by the St. Louis Cardinals.

Additionally, in early 2019, a young baseball player, Jax Nystrom, who was highlighted on Friedman's FlatGroundBats account was contacted by Alex Bregman to hit with him in Spring Training, which was featured on MLB.com as well as other publications.
