= Digital Envoy =

Information services company

DigitalEnvoy
- Industry: Information broker
- Founded: 1999
- Headquarters: Peachtree Corners, Georgia
- Website: http://www.digitalenvoy.com

Digital Envoy, Inc., part of Dominion Enterprises, is a media and information services company. It is the parent company of Digital Element and Digital Resolve, whose primary product is the NetAcuity IP location service. The incumbent President of Digital Envoy is Jerrod Stoller.

== Company & History ==
Founded in 1999 by Rob Friedman, Sanjay Parekh and Dennis Maicon, Digital Envoy patented, and introduced geotargeting technology (also recognized as geolocation or IP location technology). In 2005, Digital Envoy created two business units: Digital Element and Digital Resolve. In 2007, Landmark Communications, Inc. purchased Digital Envoy. The company became part of Dominion Enterprises in 2009.

Digital Envoy, through its Digital Element business unit, is often considered to be the main supplier of IP targeting technology to the online advertising industry. According to AdOps Insider, "practically speaking, most of the advertising industry relies on a small company called Digital Envoy" for IP address geolocation of advertisements.

In August 2021, Digital Envoy acquired location data provider, X-Mode and rebranded it as "Outlogic". In 2024, the Federal Trade Commission (FTC) issued an order prohibiting Digital Envoy's data broker companies X-Mode Social and its successor Outlogic from selling or sharing sensitive location data. This action follows allegations that the company sold precise location data without proper consumer consent, potentially revealing visits to sensitive locations such as medical clinics and places of worship.
