= BluE Nexus =

Automotive parts joint venture company

BluE Nexus Corporation
- Company type: Joint venture
- Industry: Automotive
- Headquarters: Anjō, Aichi, Japan
- Key people: Kazuhisa Ozaki (CEO)
- Owner: Aisin (45%); Denso (45%); Toyota (10%)
- Website: blue-nexus.co.jp/en

BluE Nexus is a joint venture company established by Aisin and Denso in April 2019 to build powertrain systems for electric vehicles. Both Aisin and Denso are members of the Toyota Group and the Toyota Motor Corporation has a 10% stake in the company.

The main product from BluE Nexus is the e-Axle, which integrates an electric motor, gears and inverter. Aisin makes the motor and gears while Denso makes the inverter. The e-Axle is used in the Toyota Mirai fuel cell vehicle along with the Lexus UX, Toyota C-HR/IZOA and Toyota bZ4X/Subaru Solterra electric vehicles. BluE Nexus will also market the hybrid drive systems (including the Hybrid Synergy Drive) produced by Aisin.
