= Jake Diekman =

American baseball player and coach (born 1987)

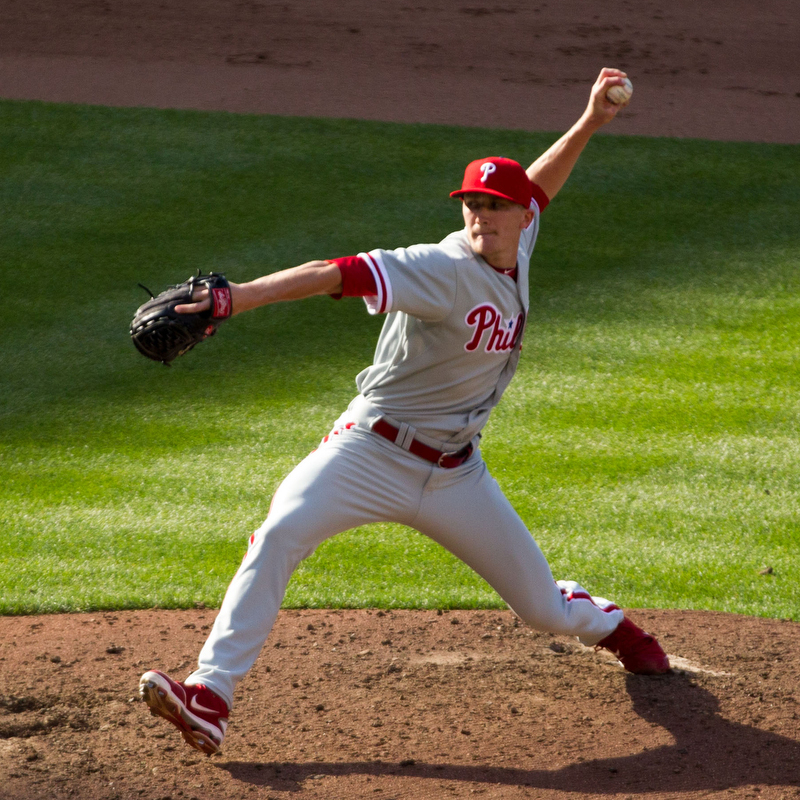
- Diekman with the Philadelphia Phillies in 2012
- Pitcher
- Born: January 21, 1987 (age 39); Wymore, Nebraska, U.S.
- Batted: Right Threw: Left

MLB debut
- May 15, 2012, for the Philadelphia Phillies

Last MLB appearance
- July 28, 2024, for the New York Mets

MLB statistics
- Win–loss record: 27–34
- Earned run average: 3.91
- Strikeouts: 764
- Stats at Baseball Reference

Teams
- Philadelphia Phillies (2012–2015); Texas Rangers (2015–2018); Arizona Diamondbacks (2018); Kansas City Royals (2019); Oakland Athletics (2019–2021); Boston Red Sox (2022); Chicago White Sox (2022–2023); Tampa Bay Rays (2023); New York Mets (2024)

Career highlights and awards
- Pitched a combined no-hitter on September 1, 2014

Jacob Tanner Diekman (born January 21, 1987) is an American former professional baseball pitcher and current coach. He played in Major League Baseball (MLB) for the Philadelphia Phillies, Texas Rangers, Arizona Diamondbacks, Kansas City Royals, Oakland Athletics, Boston Red Sox, Chicago White Sox, Tampa Bay Rays, and New York Mets.

With the Phillies, Diekman began as a starting pitcher and progressed through a few levels of the Phillies' farm system in his first two years in that role, before adjusting his mechanics and lowering his arm slot to throw sidearm out of the bullpen, as a relief pitcher. The adjustment worked and helped him move through the remaining levels of the Phillies' farm system. In 2012, Diekman made his major league debut. Over the next two seasons, he split time between the major league Phillies and their Triple-A affiliate, the Lehigh Valley IronPigs, though while he was with the major league team, he was considered one of the "lone bright spots" in both 2012 and 2013. Diekman throws a fastball in the upper-90s (mph), a slider, and an occasional changeup.

== Early career ==
Diekman was born to Paul and Billie Diekman, in 1987. He has one brother, Brian. The Diekmans lived in Wymore, Nebraska, where Jake attended Southern High School. His alma mater was too small to field a baseball team, so he instead focused on golf. Eventually, Diekman joined an American Legion baseball team, playing in the summer with other players from Wymore and several surrounding towns, which he called "the best experience of my life ... so much fun." Concurrently, Diekman worked full-time at a lawn mower factory, to earn money to pursue a post-secondary education.

After graduating from high school, Diekman enrolled at Doane College, pitching one season for the school's ball team. He then transferred to Cloud County Community College, in Kansas. Following Diekman's sophomore season, he attended a junior college baseball showcase at which, with a fastball well over 90 miles per hour (140 km/h), Diekman drew much interest. He received a full scholarship offer from Nebraska, which he would have accepted, had the Phillies not drafted him in the 2007 Major League Baseball draft's 30th round.

== Professional career ==
=== Philadelphia Phillies ===
Between 2007 and 2010, Diekman pitched in the lower levels of the Philadelphia Phillies' Minor League system initially as a starter, and subsequently as a reliever. Although he initially saw success in 2007, posting a 2.72 ERA in 10 starts with the rookie-level Gulf Coast League Phillies and Low-A Williamsport Crosscutters, he struggled in 2008, posting an ERA of 5.09 in 27 starts, split between Williamsport and the Single-A Lakewood BlueClaws. At the conclusion of both 2008 and 2009, he pitched in the Florida Instructional League to continue honing his skills on the mound.

Diekman converted from a starting pitcher to a reliever in 2009, along with several other Phillies pitching prospects. Around that time, he also, at the suggestion of the same minor league pitching coaches who converted him to relief, lowered his release point to his current low angle. Success did not manifest itself immediately, as he still posted a 4.04 ERA in 2009, his first season in relief, but in 2010, he cut his ERA to 2.91 while splitting time between Lakewood and the Clearwater Threshers, the Phillies' High-A affiliate. At the end of the 2010 season, he played for the Mesa Solar Sox in the Arizona Fall League. He spent the 2011 season with the Double-A Reading Phillies, accruing a 0–1 record and a 3.05 ERA and three saves in 53 games. Thereafter, the Phillies added him to their 40-man roster to protect him from the Rule 5 draft.

After receiving praise from Phillies' pitching coach Rich Dubee for his performance in spring training, Diekman opened the 2012 season with the Triple-A Lehigh Valley IronPigs. With Lehigh Valley, he posted a 1–0 record and a 0.59 ERA with five saves in 13 games in the season's first month. Diekman was added to the Phillies' 25-man Major League roster on May 11, and four days later recorded a win against the Houston Astros in his MLB debut. He finished the year an established lefty specialist, and had a 3.95 ERA, though walked 6.6 batters per 9 innings, and was erratic in his control.

Entering 2013, Diekman was expected to be a key part of the Phillies bullpen after his success in 2012, however he did not break camp with the big league club, beginning the season in Triple-A. In Triple-A, he struggled, which delayed his arrival to the major league team until June. While with the big league club, he continued his dominance of left-handed hitters, however was not as good against right-handed hitters (a 150-point differential in opponent batting average and over 300 point differential in On-base plus slugging (OPS)). Diekman improved his control, which made him a presumptive member of the 2014 bullpen, as he was one of 2013's "lone bright spots" for the otherwise dismal Phillies' bullpen. Ultimately, he did make the Phillies' opening day roster as a member of the bullpen.

Early in the season, Diekman emerged as a reliable reliever in the Phillies' bullpen, and was used extensively by manager Ryne Sandberg. As the season progressed, Diekman was more successful against left-handed hitters than right-handed hitters, but was used against both in a variety of situations. On September 1, 2014, Diekman was one of four pitchers who combined for a no-hitter in the Phillies' 7–0 win over the Atlanta Braves in Turner Field. By the end of the season, the Phillies had one of the best bullpens in the league, and it consisted predominantly of young players such as Diekman. There was excitement from both Phillies' personnel and writers that the bullpen could remain solid for a long time because of young pitchers such as Diekman, Ken Giles, and Justin De Fratus. Moreover, Diekman and Giles had potential as closers should the Phillies trade Jonathan Papelbon. Overall, Diekman emerged as a name to be mentioned among the "elite" relievers of the National League, but was overused against right-handed batters, which hurt his statistics.

=== Texas Rangers ===
On July 31, 2015, Diekman was traded to the Texas Rangers along with Cole Hamels in exchange for Matt Harrison, Nick Williams, Jorge Alfaro, Jake Thompson, Alec Asher, and Jerad Eickhoff. He became an important bullpen piece in the Rangers' run to the playoffs in 2016. Diekman and the Rangers agreed to a one-year deal worth $1.225 million on January 29, 2016, and avoided arbitration. Diekman finished the 2016 season with a 4–2 record, 4 saves and a 3.40 ERA in 66 appearances. On January 25, 2017, Diekman underwent surgery for chronic ulcerative colitis. He only made 11 appearances towards the end of the season. In 2018, fully healthy, Diekman posted an ERA of 3.69 in 47 games. He struck out 48 batters in 39 innings.

=== Arizona Diamondbacks ===
On July 31, 2018, Diekman was traded to the Arizona Diamondbacks for Wei-Chieh Huang and Joshua Javier. The trade took place while the Diamondbacks and Rangers were facing off in a two-game series in Arizona. Diekman struggled after being acquired by Arizona, posting an ERA of 7.53 in 24 appearances. Diekman became a free agent following the 2018 season.

=== Kansas City Royals ===
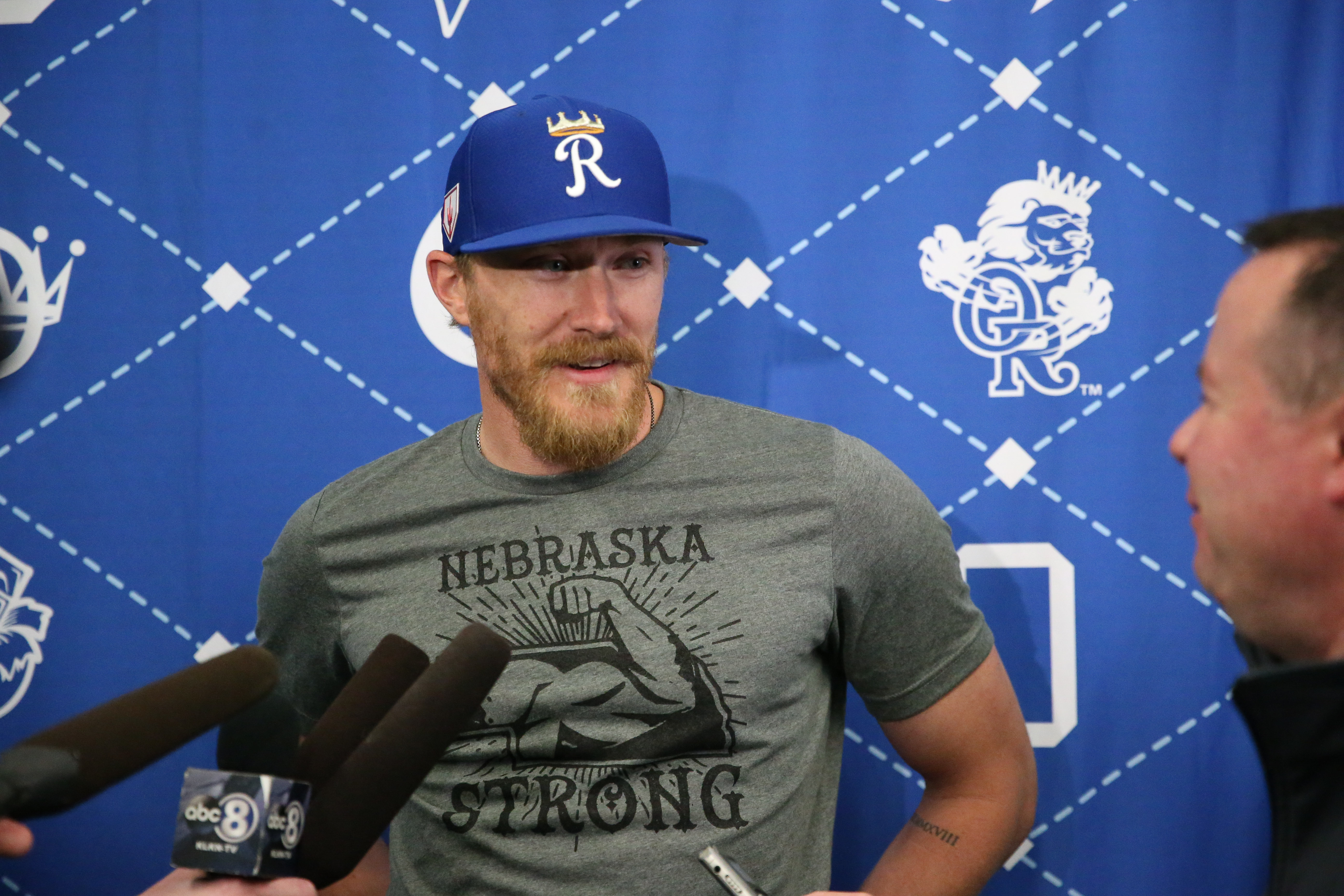
Diekman with the Royals in 2019

On February 13, 2019, Diekman signed a one-year contract with a mutual option for 2020 with the Kansas City Royals. The deal was worth a reported $2.75 million guaranteed, plus performance incentives. In 48 relief appearances with the 2019 Royals, Diekman accrued a 4.75 ERA and an 0–6 record while striking out 63 batters in 41 2/3 innings.

=== Oakland Athletics ===
On July 27, 2019, the Royals traded Diekman to the Oakland Athletics for Ismael Aquino and Dairon Blanco. On September 6, Diekman pitched in a suspended game between the Athletics and Detroit Tigers that originally started on May 19, allowing a double in a scoreless inning. This appearance was recorded on the original game date of May 19, when Diekman threw an inning of relief for the Royals against the Los Angeles Angels. Diekman thus accomplished the rare feat of having pitched for two different teams on the same day, statistically. For the 2019 season, he tied for the major league lead in holds (31). In 28 games for the A's, Diekman struck out 21 in 20 1/3 innings.

Diekman became a free agent following the 2019 season after the Athletics declined his contract option. On December 3, 2019, Diekman re-signed with Oakland on a two-year contract. In the 2020 shortened season, Diekman only allowed 2 runs in 21 1/3 innings.

=== Boston Red Sox ===
On March 16, 2022, Diekman signed a two-year contract with a club option for 2024 with the Boston Red Sox. In 44 relief appearances through the end of July, he compiled a 5–1 record and a 4.23 ERA while striking out 51 batters in 38 1/3 innings.

=== Chicago White Sox ===
On August 1, 2022, Diekman was traded to the Chicago White Sox for catcher Reese McGuire and Taylor Broadway. In 26 relief appearances through the end of the season, Diekman compiled an 0–3 record with a 6.52 ERA while striking out 28 batters in 19 1/3 innings.

In 2023, Diekman made 13 appearances for the White Sox, struggling immensely to a 7.94 ERA with 11 strikeouts in 11 1/3 innings pitched. On May 2, 2023, Diekman was designated for assignment by Chicago. He was released by the team on May 6.

=== Tampa Bay Rays ===
On May 10, 2023, Diekman signed a one-year, major league deal with the Tampa Bay Rays. In 50 relief appearances for the Rays, he recorded a 2.18 ERA with 53 strikeouts across 45 1/3 innings of work. He became a free agent following the season.

=== New York Mets ===
On February 6, 2024, Diekman signed a one-year, $4 million contract with the New York Mets. The deal included a vesting option for the 2025 season. In 43 appearances for the Mets, he compiled a 5.63 ERA with 40 strikeouts and 4 saves over 32 innings of work. On July 29, Diekman was designated for assignment by the Mets. He was then released by the team on August 3.

=== Lincoln Saltdogs ===
On February 11, 2025, Diekman signed a minor league contract with the Atlanta Braves organization. He was released prior to the start of the season on March 19.

On April 22, 2025, Diekman signed with the Lincoln Saltdogs of the American Association of Professional Baseball. Appearing in four games as a reliever, he pitched to a 3.00 ERA over three total innings of work, giving up one run while striking out seven batters. On May 23, Diekman announced his retirement from professional baseball.

== Coaching career ==
In December of 2025, Diekman accepted a position as head coach of Lincoln Christian School, in Lincoln, Nebraska.

== Pitching style ==
"Diekman's rise in the Phillies system commenced once he adjusted his mechanics to throw side-arm. His 96.3-m.p.h. average fastball velocity this season ranks among the fastest of all relievers. His 27 strikeouts were fourth entering the weekend. His skill-set - a funky lefthanded delivery with dominant stuff - could create a lengthy career."

— "Phillies' Diekman Holds Memory of His Mother Close", by Matt Gelb, The Philadelphia Inquirer, May 11, 2014

A lefty specialist, Diekman throws a fastball in the mid-90s, a slider at 78–81, and an occasional changeup to right-handed hitters. His fastball is among the fastest of left-handed relievers in the major leagues. Like most left-handed pitchers, particularly those who throw out of an arm angle similar to Diekman's, he is tough on left-handed hitters. In 2013, he held lefties to just a .368 OPS, though allowed a .765 OPS to right-handed hitters. Despite suggestions he remain a lefty specialist, he emerged in 2014 as a favorite middle reliever for manager Ryne Sandberg against both righties and lefties. In 2020, Diekman credited Rob Friedman with helping improve his slider grip through Twitter, increasing the horizontal break on his slider substantially.

== Personal life ==
Diekman's mother, Billie, died at age 57 just months before the Phillies drafted him. Diekman describes his father Paul as his "best friend", and one who has helped him cope with his mother's death. His mother was Diekman's "biggest fan" and had to order her husband to stop pacing and watch Diekman pitch. Diekman has sought therapy to cope with the loss of his mother, and meditates and thinks about her during "The Star-Spangled Banner" prior to each game.

"(After his mother's death) Diekman started to appreciate the little things. The game slowed down when he had fun. He invoked his mother's spirit rather than avoiding it. 'The drive and determination she had for all the projects she did, how hard she worked, the dedication she had for her job,' Diekman said. 'It really paid off. It really came to me. I thought, 'If I have a job, I want to put in the time and dedication like she did.' ' That is how Billie Diekman's legacy perseveres. It is why a young man from tiny Wymore, Neb., will cherish Sunday's rendition of "The Star-Spangled Banner" at a baseball stadium..."

— Excerpt from "Phillies' Diekman Holds Memory of His Mother Close", by Matt Gelb, The Philadelphia Inquirer, May 11, 2014

Away from baseball, Diekman holds an associate's degree in business administration from Cloud County Community College. He enjoys listening to music, working out, playing golf, and long walks on the beach. He resides in Beatrice, Nebraska, during the offseason. Because of his struggles with ulcerative colitis, he started a non-profit association called Gut It Out to benefit others who struggle with the disease.

Preceded by Tim Lincecum	No-hit game September 1, 2014 (with Hamels, Giles, & Papelbon)	Succeeded by Jordan Zimmermann
