= Toyota bZ4X =

Battery electric crossover SUVs produced by Subaru and Toyota

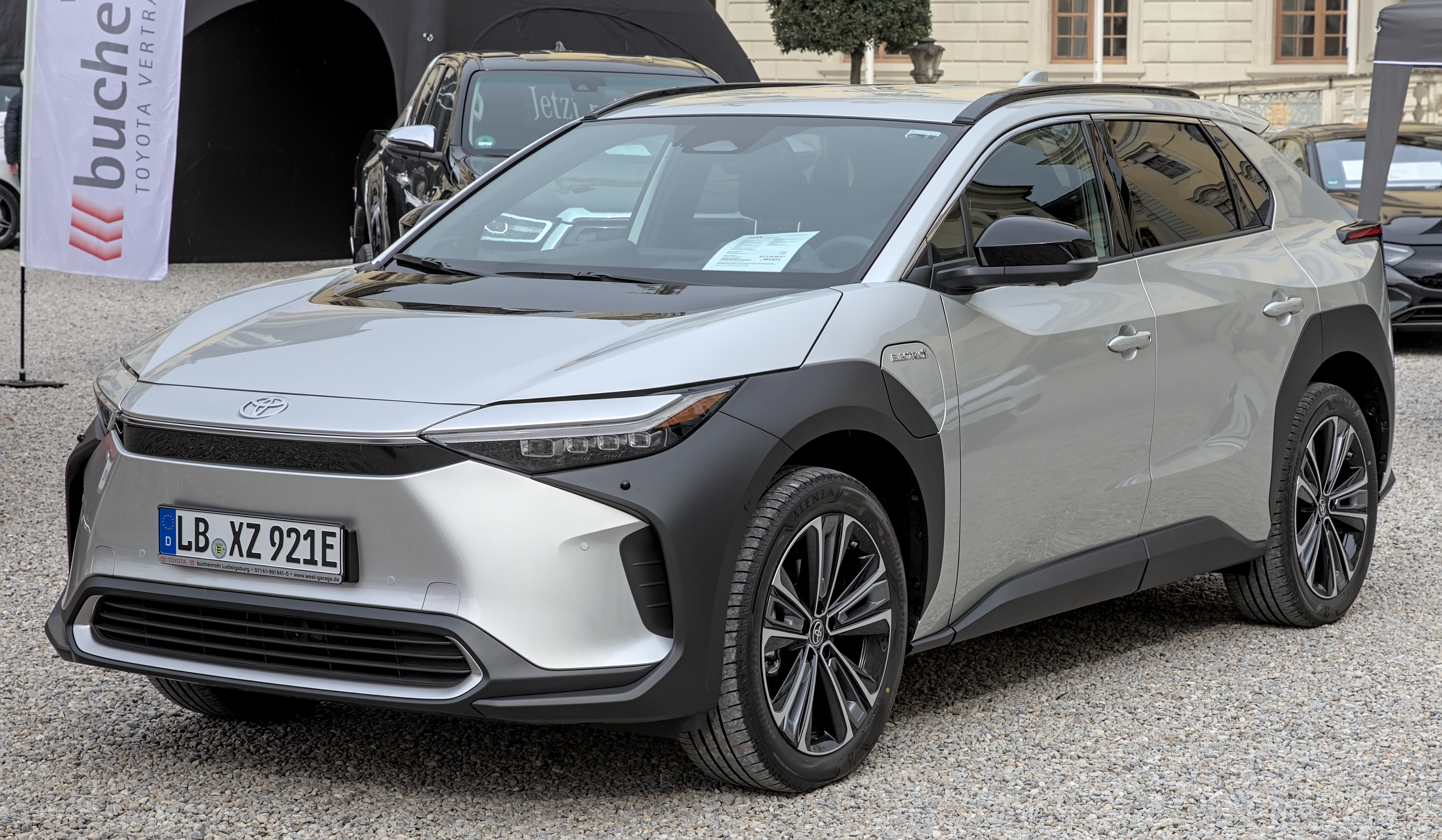
- 2023 Toyota bZ4X AWD (YEAM15, Europe)

Overview
- Manufacturer: Toyota
- Model code: EA10
- Also called: Toyota bZ (North America and Ireland, 2025–present); Subaru Solterra
- Production: April 2022 – present
- Model years: 2023–present
- Assembly: Japan: Toyota, Aichi (Motomachi plant); China: Guangzhou (GAC Toyota); Tianjin (FAW Toyota until 2023); Indonesia: Karawang, West Java (TMMIN, 2025–present)
- Designer: Katsuhiro Suzuki (Chief Designer); Hirotada Kobayashi, Nobuhiko Honda, Tsuyoshi Oba, Junya Ono, and Hiroyuki Tada

Body and chassis
- Class: Compact crossover SUV
- Body style: 5-door SUV
- Layout: Front-motor, front-wheel-drive; Dual-motor, all-wheel-drive
- Platform: e-TNGA
- Related: Lexus RZ; Toyota bZ3; Toyota C-HR+/C-HR / Subaru Uncharted

Powertrain
- Electric motor: Pre-facelift: 1×1XM AC permanent magnet synchronous (FWD); 2×1YM AC permanent magnet synchronous (AWD); Facelift: 1×2XM AC permanent magnet synchronous (FWD); 2×3XM AC permanent magnet synchronous (AWD)
- Power output: Pre-facelift: 150 kW (201 hp; 204 PS) (XEAM10); 160 kW (215 hp; 218 PS) (YEAM15); Facelift: 122 kW (164 hp; 166 PS) (Standard Range FWD); 165 kW (221 hp; 224 PS) (Long Range FWD); 252 kW (338 hp; 343 PS) (Long Range AWD)
- Transmission: BluE Nexus "eAxle"
- Battery: 50.3kWh CATL NMC; 66.7 kWh CATL NMC; 71.4 kWh PPES lithium-ion; 72.8 kWh CATL lithium-ion; Facelift: 57.7 kWh LGES LFP; 73.1 kWh PPES NMC; 74.7 kWh PPES NMC
- Range: 460–530 km (286–329 mi) (WLTP); 485–615 km (301–382 mi) (NEDC); 222–252 mi (357–406 km) (EPA)
- Plug-in charging: 6.6–11 kW AC; 150 kW DC CCS (FWD & European AWD); 100 kW DC CCS (North American AWD)

Dimensions
- Wheelbase: 2,850 mm (112.2 in)
- Length: 4,690 mm (184.6 in)
- Width: 1,860 mm (73.2 in)
- Height: 1,650 mm (65.0 in)
- Curb weight: 1,910–2,030 kg (4,211–4,475 lb)

Chronology
- Predecessor: Toyota RAV4 EV

The Toyota bZ4X, marketed as simply the Toyota bZ in North America and Ireland since 2025, is a battery electric compact crossover SUV manufactured by Toyota. A Subaru version is marketed as the Subaru Solterra. Lexus also offers a sibling model of the bZ4X, the Lexus RZ.

The vehicle debuted in April 2021 as the "bZ4X Concept". It is the first vehicle to be based on the e-TNGA platform co-developed by Toyota and Subaru, and the brand's first model to be part of their Toyota bZ ("beyond Zero") series of zero-emissions vehicles.

Worldwide sales of the bZ4X started out in mid-2022, with production planned in Japan and China. Sales in the United States also started in 2022. When first introduced, Toyota said it would be the first of seven "bZ" models to be launched globally by 2025; however, the company fell far short of that goal and began to move away from the bZ naming convention in 2025.

The model received a major refresh in 2025, initially for Europe and North America, with design updates and major mechanical improvements such as more efficient motors, improved cooling, and higher power output. For North America and Ireland, the model was renamed to Toyota bZ. An extended length, station wagon-like version was also introduced as the bZ Woodland in North America, and as the bZ4X Touring in Europe. A Subaru version of the extended length version is marketed as the Subaru Trailseeker (Japanese: スバル・トレイルシーカー, Hepburn: Subaru Toreirushīkā), and as the E-Outback in Europe, Singapore, and Taiwan.

== Name ==
According to Toyota, the meaning of the "bZ4X" nameplate breaks down into:

- "bZ": for "beyond Zero" emissions, representing the nature of a battery-electric vehicle by going "beyond Zero" emissions,
- "4": from the equivalent-sized Toyota RAV4 and the
- "X": describing it as a compact crossover ('X') SUV.

== Overview ==
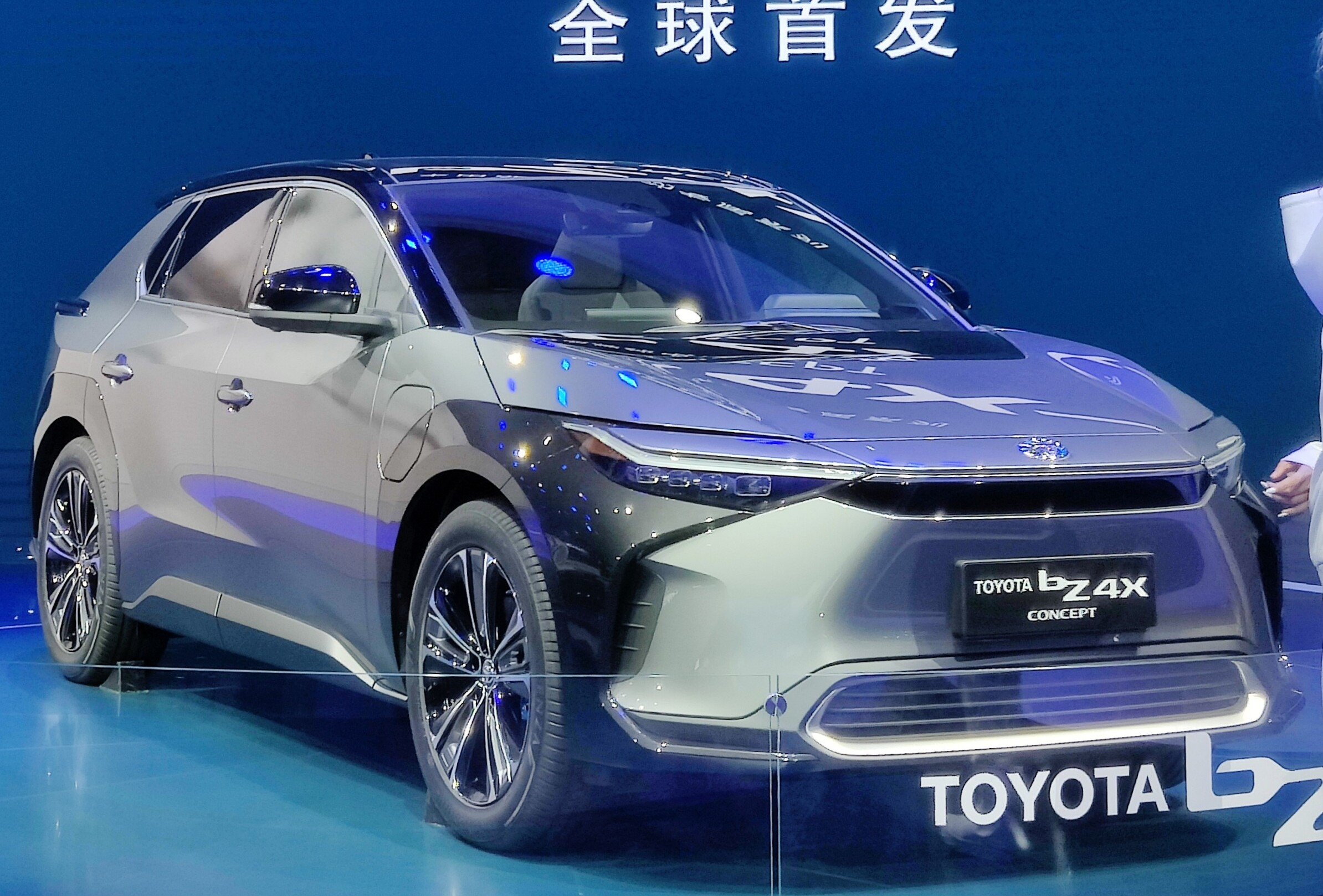
bZ4X Concept at 2021 Auto Shanghai

The design of the bZ4X was previewed by pictures of a series of electric concept vehicles released by Toyota in June 2019. The company highlighted the plan to release six electric vehicles between 2020 and 2025, using the e-TNGA platform. The vehicle was also previewed by Subaru, which is developing the vehicle with Toyota as a concept mockup showcasing a similar concept design in January 2020.

The bZ4X Concept was revealed on 19 April 2021 and was presented at Auto Shanghai the same day. While it is revealed as a concept vehicle, the vehicle appeared to be nearly production-ready. The bZ4X is similar in size to the RAV4, but stood lower with sharper styling and a longer wheelbase that matches the larger Highlander's. The vehicle has been developed in conjunction with Subaru, which is said to have had input into the car's all-wheel drive system.

== Design ==
The total length 4,690 mm (185 in) is comparable to a RAV4 (XA50), but the wheelbase of 2,850 mm (112 in) is similar to that of the Land Cruiser (J300), giving the bZ4X a large interior space. The e-TNGA platform was jointly developed by Toyota and Subaru, with Toyota receiving credit for battery and eAxle development and Subaru for the all-wheel-drive control and collision safety.

In some markets, the bZ4X is available with an optional steer-by-wire system. The steer-by-wire system was developed for the Chinese market and will be available with a yoke in lieu of a conventional steering wheel. Combined with the low instrument panel, Toyota stated the yoke provides a more open interior.

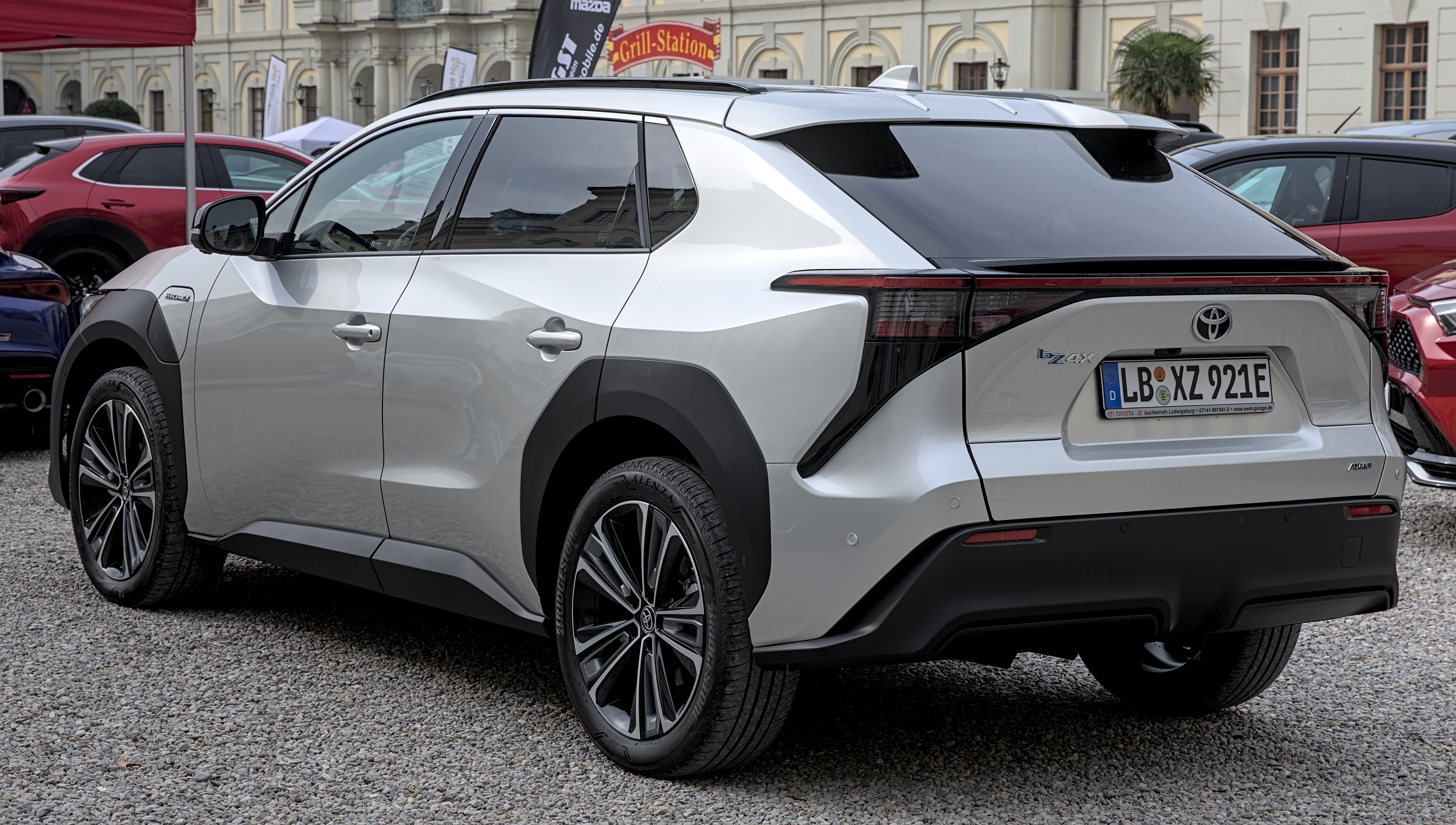
Rear view

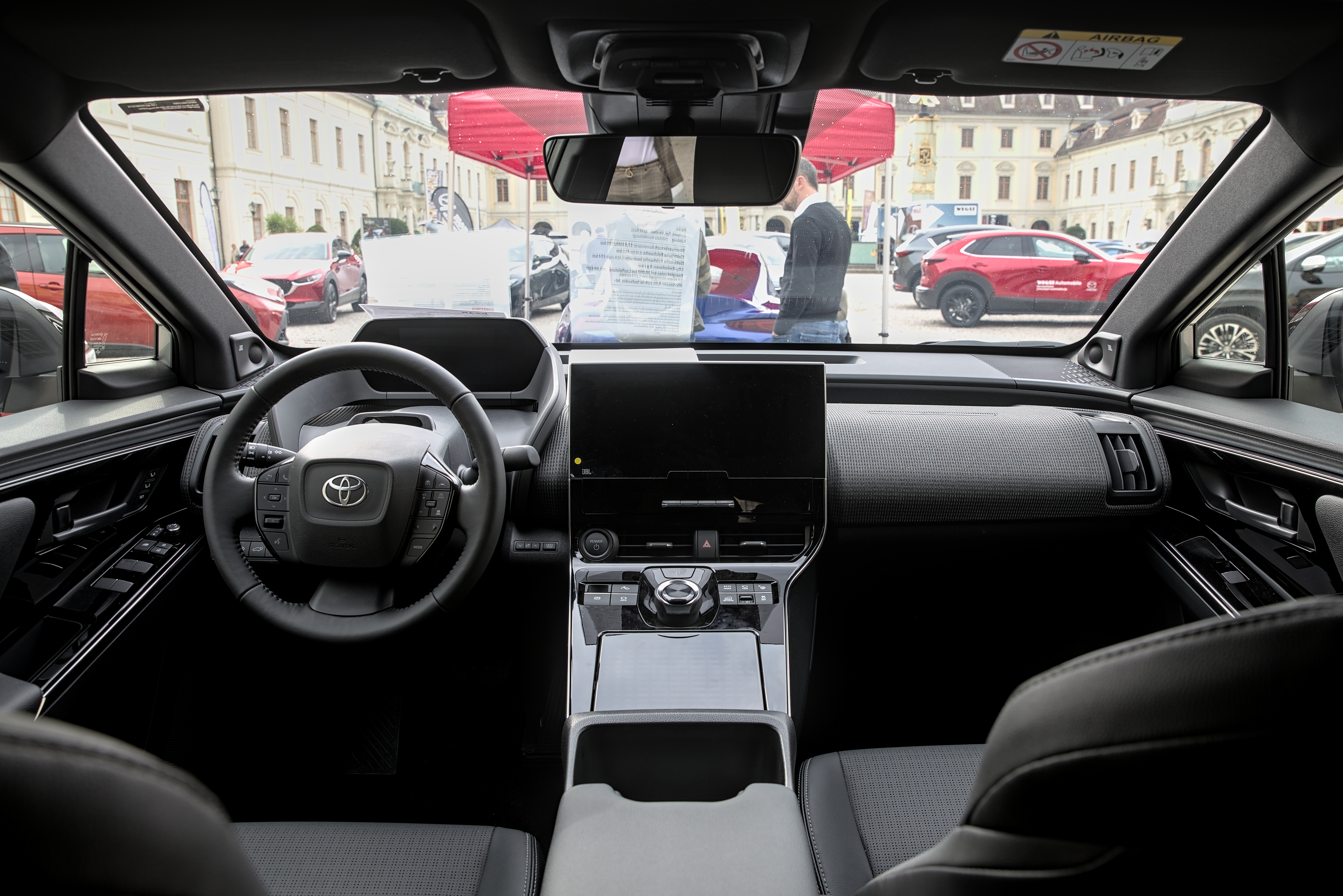
Interior

=== Original models ===
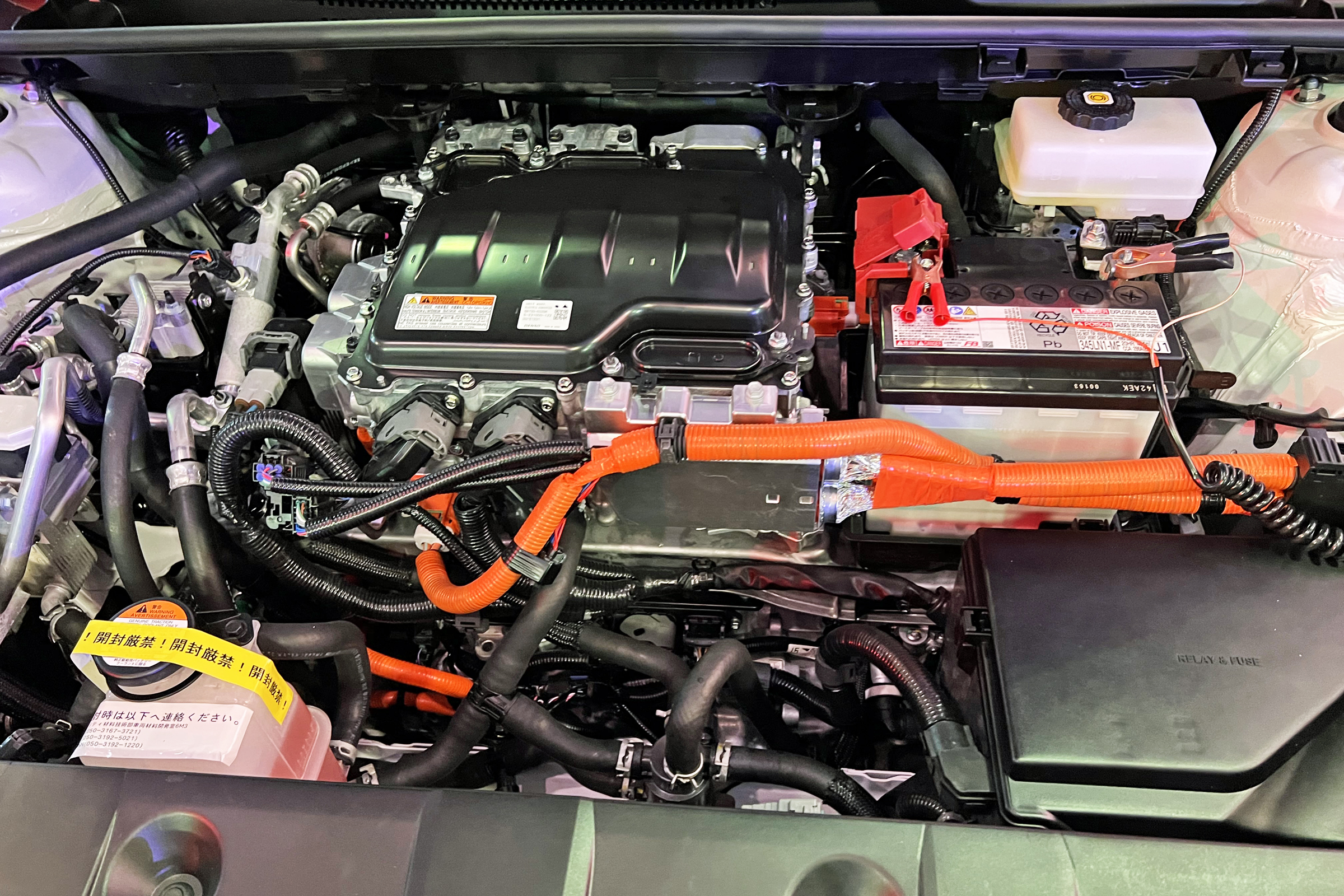
Under-the-hood equipment, including the main power inverter (center), 12V accessory battery, and fusebox

The bZ4X is powered by an e-Axle unit that integrates the electric motor, gears, and inverter, manufactured by BluE Nexus, a joint venture between Toyota Group companies Aisin and Denso, with investment from Toyota. Front-wheel-drive (FWD) models use a single 1XM e-Axle rated at 150 kilowatts (201 hp; 204 PS), while all-wheel-drive (AWD) models use dual 1YM e-Axles rated at 80 kW (107 hp; 109 PS) each, for a combined output of 160 kW (215 hp; 218 PS).

FWD models have an estimated range of 510 kilometers (317 miles) and accelerate from 0 to 100 km/h in 7.5 seconds. AWD models have an estimated range of 460 km (286 miles) and a 0–100 km/h time of 6.9 seconds. AWD versions feature the 'X-MODE' all-wheel-drive system, sourced from the Subaru Forester.

FWD variants are equipped with a 71.4 kWh lithium-ion battery pack supplied by Prime Planet Energy & Solutions (PPES), a joint venture between Toyota and Panasonic. AWD models for the North American market use a 72.8 kWh pack supplied by CATL. Both battery types operate at 355 volts and support DC fast charging: up to 150 kW for FWD and PPES battery AWD models and up to 100 kW for North America (CATL Battery) AWD models. The battery is expected to retain 90% of its original capacity over a ten-year period.

Using a fast charger, the PPES battery can charge to 80% capacity in approximately 30 minutes. However, AWD models with the CATL battery were subject to criticism, as charging from 0–80% could take up to one hour, and vehicles were limited to three fast-charging sessions per day.

An optional roof-mounted solar panel system can generate enough electricity to provide an estimated 1,800 km (1,100 miles) of range per year. The vehicle was originally announced to support bidirectional charging and act as a power supply in vehicle-to-home (V2H) or vehicle-to-load (V2L) applications, but as of July 2025, such functionality has not yet been enabled for the 2023, 2024 and 2025 models. Toyota is actively testing this feature with both San Diego Gas and Electric and PEPCO (Maryland).

| Model | Chassis code | Electric motor | Power | Torque | Range (WLTP) |
|---|---|---|---|---|---|
| FWD | XEAM10 | 1× BluE Nexus eAxle 1XM | 150 kW (201 hp; 204 PS) | 266 N⋅m (196 lb⋅ft) | 567 km (352 mi) |
| AWD | YEAM15 | 2× BluE Nexus eAxle 1YM | 80 kW (107 hp; 109 PS) per motor; 160 kW (215 hp; 218 PS) total | 338 N⋅m (249 lb⋅ft) | 487–542 km (303–337 mi) |

=== 2025 facelift ===
In May 2025, Toyota announced a mid-cycle refresh ("facelift") for the vehicle, introducing several updates aimed at addressing criticisms of the outgoing model. As part of the update, the model name was changed for the North American and Irish markets from Toyota bZ4X to simply Toyota bZ.

Among the most significant changes are to the vehicles DC fast charging capabilities, allowing the vehicle to charge from 10% to 80% in approximately 30 minutes. The outgoing model had been widely criticized for its poor charging performance, with some versions requiring up to an hour to reach 80% charge and being limited to only three DC fast charging sessions per day.

The improved charging performance is enabled by an improved charging curve (its ability to sustain a high level of power for a long time) and a new battery pre-conditioning feature, made possible by an upgraded heat pump system that warms the battery prior to charging. However, charging still caps out at a maximum of 150 kW, behind some competitors and on par with others. The onboard AC charger has been upgraded from a 7.6 kW unit to an 11 kW unit, improving Level 2 charging performance.

For the North American market, the vehicle adopts the North American Charging Standard (NACS) port. The port was located on the front right side instead of front left side. The vehicle gains Plug & Charge functionality, both changes improving compatibility with the Tesla Supercharger network.

The refresh introduces a larger lithium-ion battery with a total capacity of 74.7 kWh, offering a manufacturer-estimated range of up to 505 km (314 miles). This battery is standard on all grades except the base XLE FWD, which will use a 57.7 kWh battery. A new XLE FWD Plus trim offers the larger battery, bringing the total number of trims to five: XLE FWD, XLE FWD Plus, XLE AWD, Limited FWD, and Limited AWD.

Powertrain enhancements include updated BluE Nexus eAxle motors that utilize silicon carbide semiconductors, contributing to higher power output. All-wheel drive models uprated to deliver a combined 338 hp (343 PS), a 50% increase over the previous version, with a 0 to 60 mph time of 4.9 seconds. Front-wheel drive models also see an increase, uprated to produce up to 221 hp (224 PS).

Interior updates address several user complaints. The plastic frame that previously separated the steering wheel from the digital gauge cluster has been removed. A larger 14-inch infotainment display replaces the earlier 12.3-inch screen, and included physical knobs for volume and climate control, which were notably absent and frequently criticized in the previous model.

Exterior changes include revised styling, most notably the adoption of Toyota's new "Hammerhead"-style front fascia, as well as the replacement of the divisive black plastic overfenders with available color-matched panels for select colors.

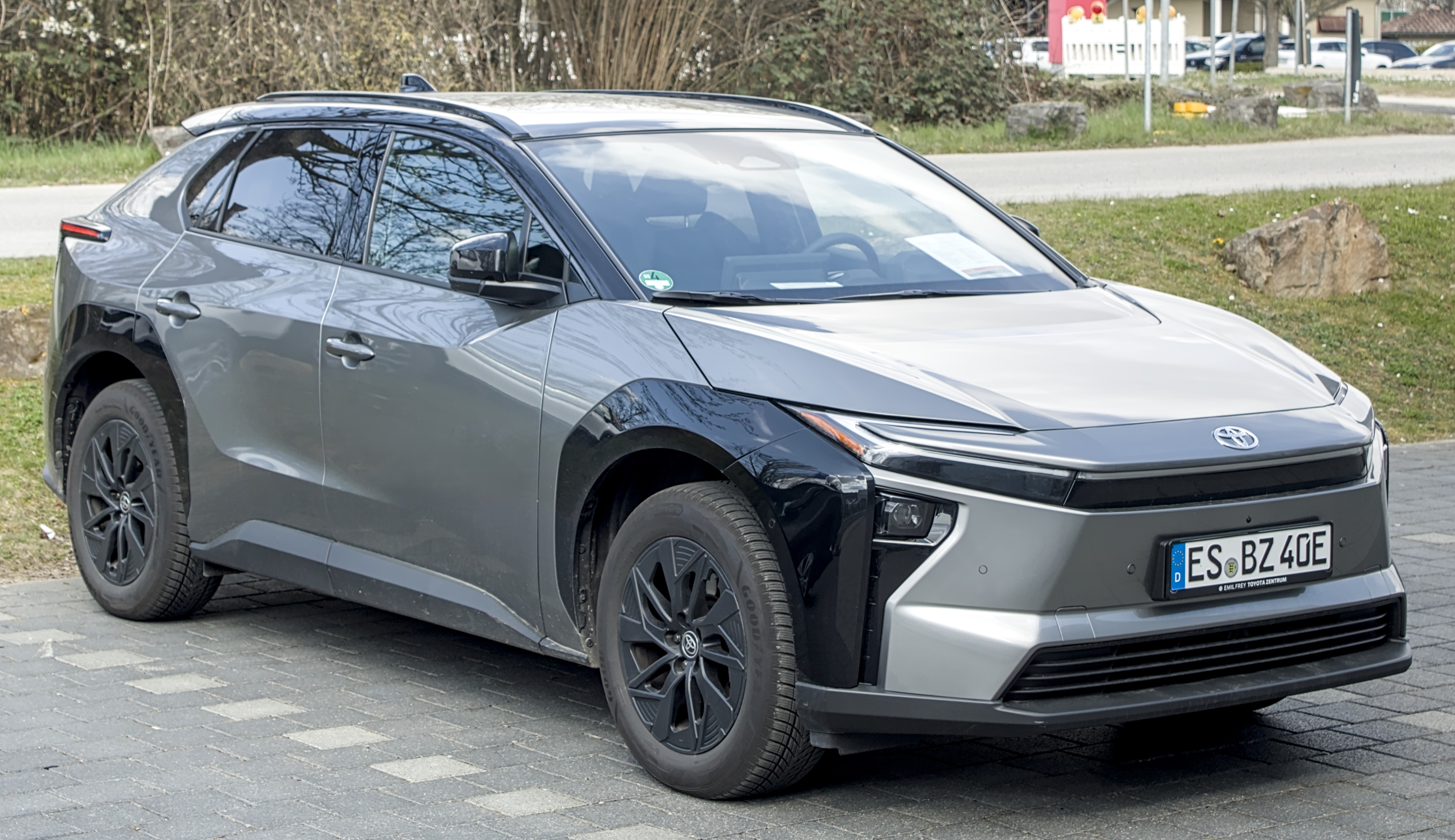
Toyota bZ4X AWD (facelift, Europe)

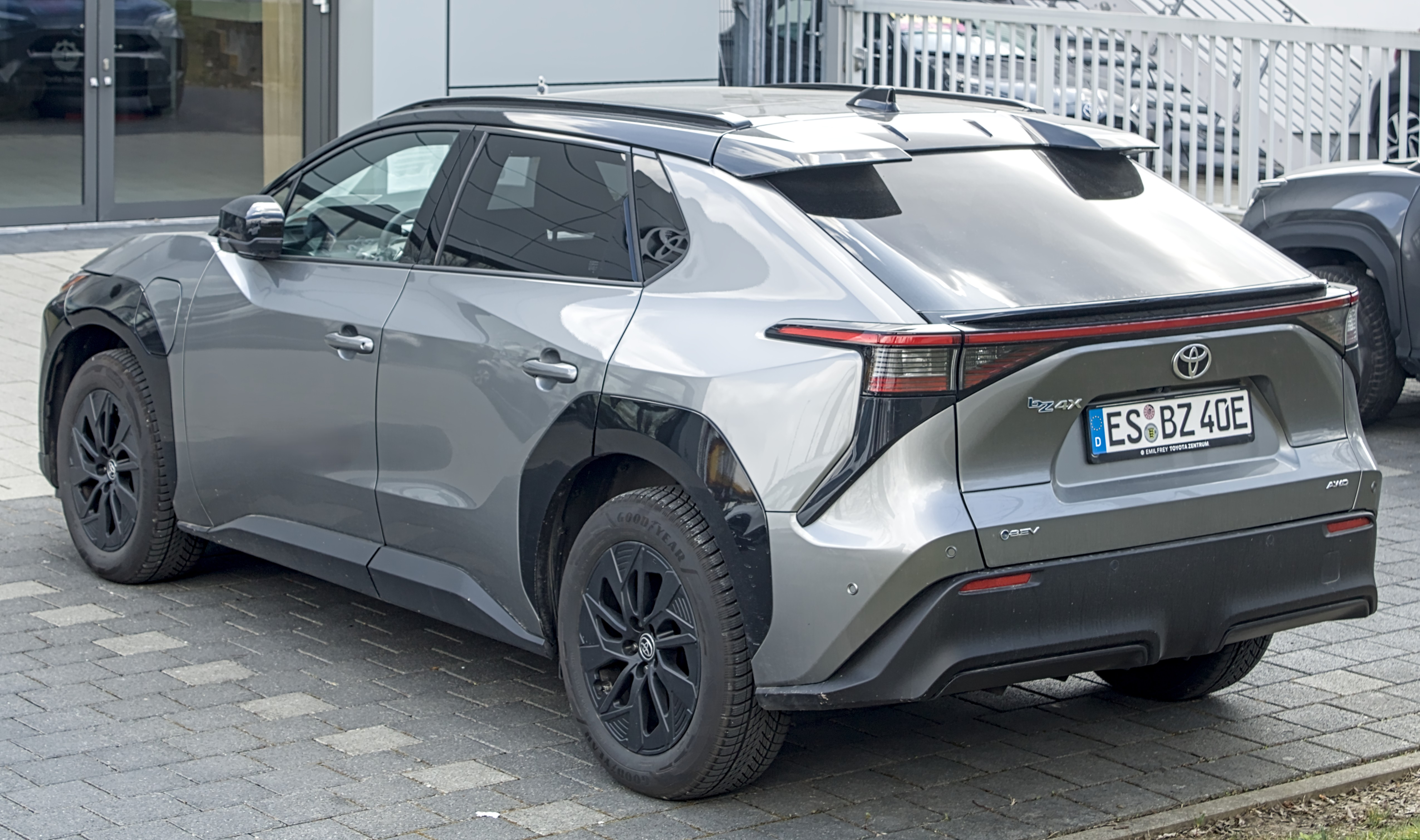
Rear view (facelift, Europe)

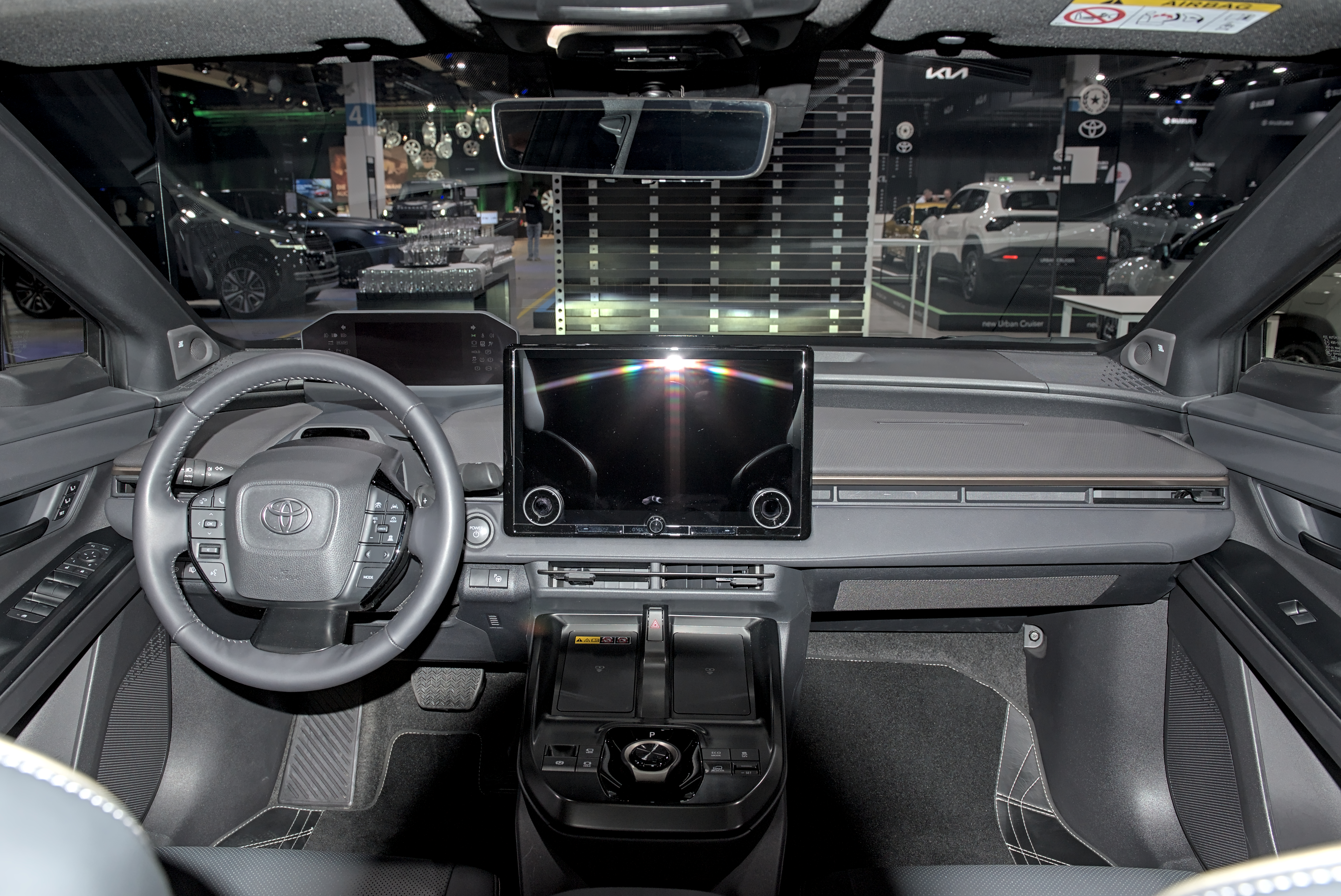
Interior (facelift, Europe)

Battery pack specifications
| Capacity | Chemistry | Supplier | Region and model | Year |
|---|---|---|---|---|
| 50.3 kWh | NMC | CATL | China | 2022–23 |
| 66.7 kWh | NMC | CATL | China | 2022–present |
| 71.4 kWh | Li-ion | PPES | FWD & European AWD | 2022–25 |
| 72.8 kWh | Li-ion | CATL | North American AWD | 2022–25 |
Facelift
| 57.7 kWh | LFP | LGES | Standard Range | 2025–present |
| 73.1 kWh | NMC | PPES | Europe & Asia | 2025–present |
| 74.4 kWh | NMC | PPES | North America | 2025–present |

== Markets ==
=== Japan ===
The Japanese market-spec bZ4X was announced in April 2022 and launched on 12 May 2022. The model is only available for lease through the company's Kinto service to "eliminate customer concerns" regarding battery electric vehicles while "taking the environment into consideration".

In the first phase, up to 3,000 lease applications will be accepted starting from 12 May; a second phase will follow in fall 2022, and Toyota/Kinto plan to lease up to 5,000 vehicles per year thereafter.

The bZ4X is available in one grade, Z, with front-wheel drive and all-wheel drive options. Specific packages include a choice of roof (standard or panoramic moon roof) and wheel size (18- or 20-inch diameter). The car is available with one of two interior colors and one of eleven exterior colors.

The facelifted bZ4X was launched in 9 October 2025, with two grades: Z and G. The G grade is only offered in front-wheel drive.

Since October 2025, the facelift bZ4X is also produced by the Takaoka Plant.

=== North America ===
The North American market-spec bZ4X was unveiled at the 2021 Los Angeles Auto Show, with its specifications also detailed by that time, including its on-sale date set in mid-2022, for the 2023 model year. Toyota-estimated range for the front-wheel-drive XLE model is up to 400 km (250 miles).

At launch, American buyers qualify for the full US$7,500 federal tax subsidy for purchasing an electric vehicle; each automobile manufacturer may sell up to 200,000 cars that qualify for the tax credit. Because Toyota plug-in hybrid vehicles also qualify for the tax credit, the credits are anticipated to be exhausted shortly after the launch of the bZ4X. The bZ4X is not eligible for electric vehicle incentives from the Inflation Reduction Act because it is made in Japan, not the US, Canada, or Mexico.

=== Europe ===
Under the WLTP driving cycle, the 2026 front-wheel-drive bZ4X achieves a range of 444 km (276 miles) with the 57.7 kWh battery or 569 km (354 miles) with the 73.1 kWh battery, and the four-wheel-drive model achieves 516 km (321 miles). Deliveries of the first vehicles commenced in summer 2022. In Ireland, the bZ4X has been sold as the bZ since 2025, as the four-wheel-drive version is not sold there.

=== Southeast Asia ===
The bZ4X was first announced in Singapore by Borneo Motors (Toyota's authorised retailer in Singapore) in June 2022 as part of an electric car-sharing program in the country's Tengah New Town. Although the car-sharing program would be rolled out in June 2023, the car has not been made available for sale in the country until 2026. The bZ4X went to sale officially in 2026 for private buyers.

The bZ4X was first showcased in Indonesia at the 29th Gaikindo Indonesia International Auto Show, and launched to the market on 10 November 2022. It is imported from Japan. It was one of the official VIP vehicles used at the 2022 G20 Bali summit. The facelifted model was unveiled on 23 July 2025 at the 32nd Gaikindo Indonesia International Auto Show, where it was declared that it would be produced in Indonesia, It was launched on 21 November 2025 at the Gaikindo Jakarta Auto Week, and local production started in November 2025. Marking the first Toyota's BEV car produced in Indonesia.

The bZ4X was launched in Thailand on 9 November 2022.

The vehicle was launched in the Philippines in December 2025.

The Toyota bZ4X EV was launched in Malaysia on 2 April 2026, along with Toyota Hilux BEV and Toyota Urban Cruiser BEV. Previously the pre-facelift bZ4X was initially shown in Malaysia in 2023.

=== Australasia ===
The bZ4X was planned to debut in Australia in 2021 but was delayed. Imports from Japan began in 2024 to Australia, New Zealand, and New Caledonia, with orders taken from late 2023. The bZ4X was Toyota's first battery EV in the Australasian market, and only available in one trim level.

From May 2025, mining company Fortescue used the pre-facelift bZ4X as a transport vehicle. Modifications over standard form include all-terrain tyres, full size spare wheel, cargo barrier and a pedestrian alert system. Supplied by Pilbara Toyota, vehicles were also fitted with Hi-Vis decals, orange roof lights and Fortescue branding. The vehicles are likely being used as a trial for electric vehicles in the mining sector, implied by decarbonisation GM Sinead Booth stating “we’re excited to bring the bZ4X to a Pilbara operations and to see how they perform in real world conditions”, as well as the easily reversible modifications for ease of sale in later years.

=== China ===
The Chinese market bZ4X was produced and marketed by two separate joint ventures, GAC Toyota and FAW Toyota. Introduced in October 2022, both versions are equipped with batteries produced by CATL. The capacity options were 50.3 kWh and 66.7 kWh with a CLTC range of 400 km (250 mi) and 615 km (382 mi) respectively.

After a series of price cuts due to slow sales, Toyota released an update for the bZ4X in November 2023. A four-wheel drive option became available, the 50.3 kWh battery option was removed, and the exterior plastic body claddings became body colored. The vehicle received a Chinese name (Chinese: 铂智4X; pinyin: Bózhì 4X; lit. 'Platinum Intelligence 4X'). The 'Bozhi' name will be the Chinese sub-brand for GAC Toyota's electric vehicles, mirroring the bZ sub-brand globally. The FAW Toyota version was discontinued.

=== South Africa ===
The bZ4X was launched in South Africa on 3 July 2026, alongside the bZ4X Touring. The South Africa variant of the bZ4X uses an electric motor on each axle, with a total system output of at 252 kW and 438 Nm. It employs a 73.1 kWh lithium battery, providing a WLTP range of up to 481 km (300 miles).

== Subaru Solterra ==
The rebadged version of the bZ4X is sold by Subaru as the Subaru Solterra (Japanese: スバル・ソルテラ, Hepburn: Subaru Sorutera). The name Solterra derives from sol and terra, Latin words for 'sun' and 'earth' respectively. The Solterra features minor design changes on the interior and exterior, including regen paddles, a squared steering wheel, and a tweaked frontend and rear lights. It uses the same e-TNGA platform rebranded to "e-Subaru Global Platform" (e-SGP). The Solterra went on sale in mid-2022 in Japan, US, Canada, Europe, and China.

In Japan, the Solterra is offered in ET-SS (FWD and AWD) and ET-HS (AWD only) grade levels. Unlike the bZ4X in Japan, the Solterra is available for purchase.

The Solterra STI Concept was introduced at 2022 Tokyo Auto Salon. The Solterra STI Concept equipped with STI parts has already been released. The lower end of the body is vibrant with a cherry red front lip spoiler, side steps, and rear under spoiler, and the upper rear end is equipped with a large roof spoiler.

Solterra vehicles use the same Toyota Safety Sense collision avoidance system, even though it is rebranded as Subaru EyeSight. They also use the same Toyota connected services for in-car navigation and entertainment, with branding removed.

Subaru Solterra (pre-facelift)

Rear view

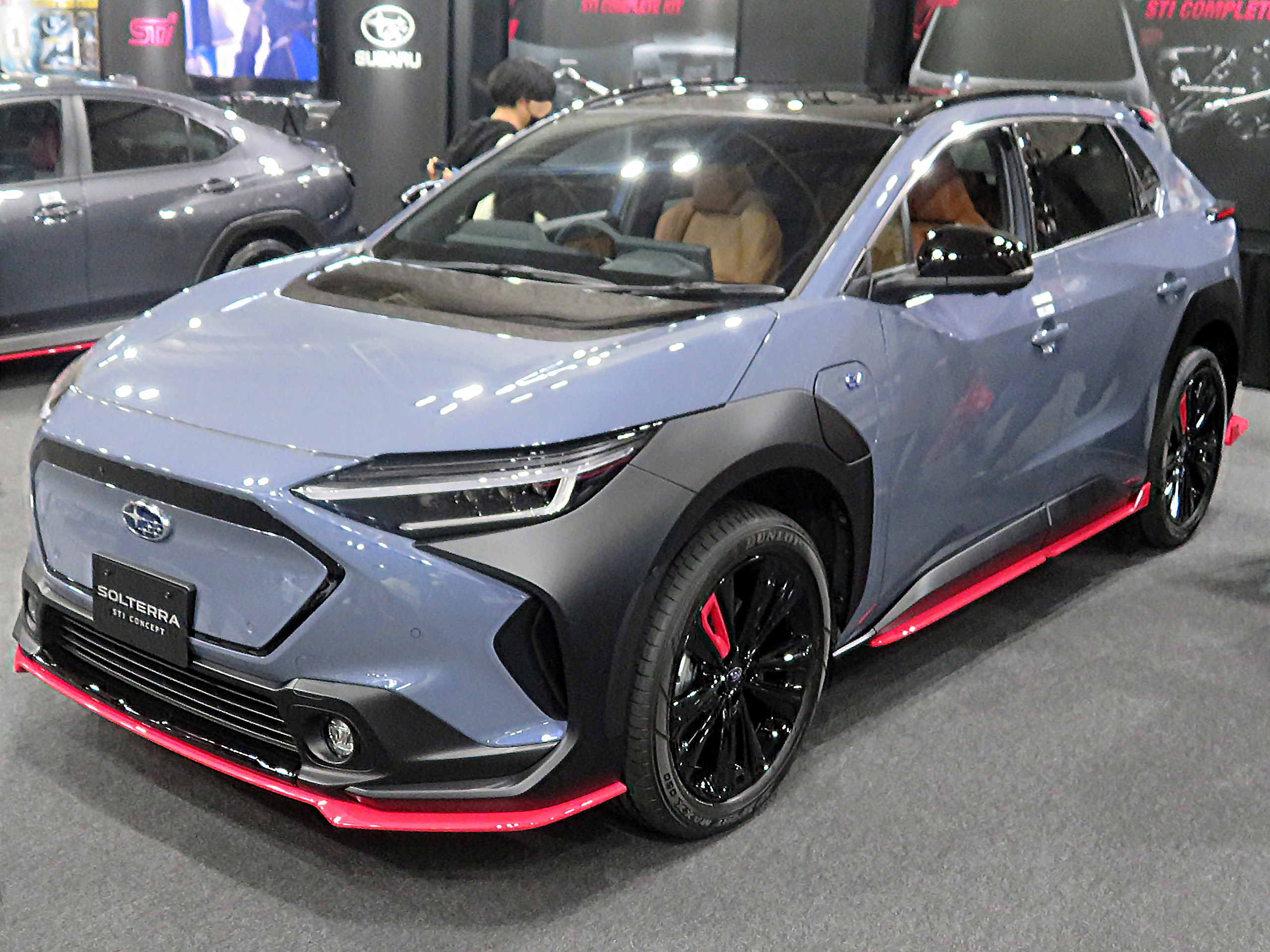
Subaru Solterra STI Concept front

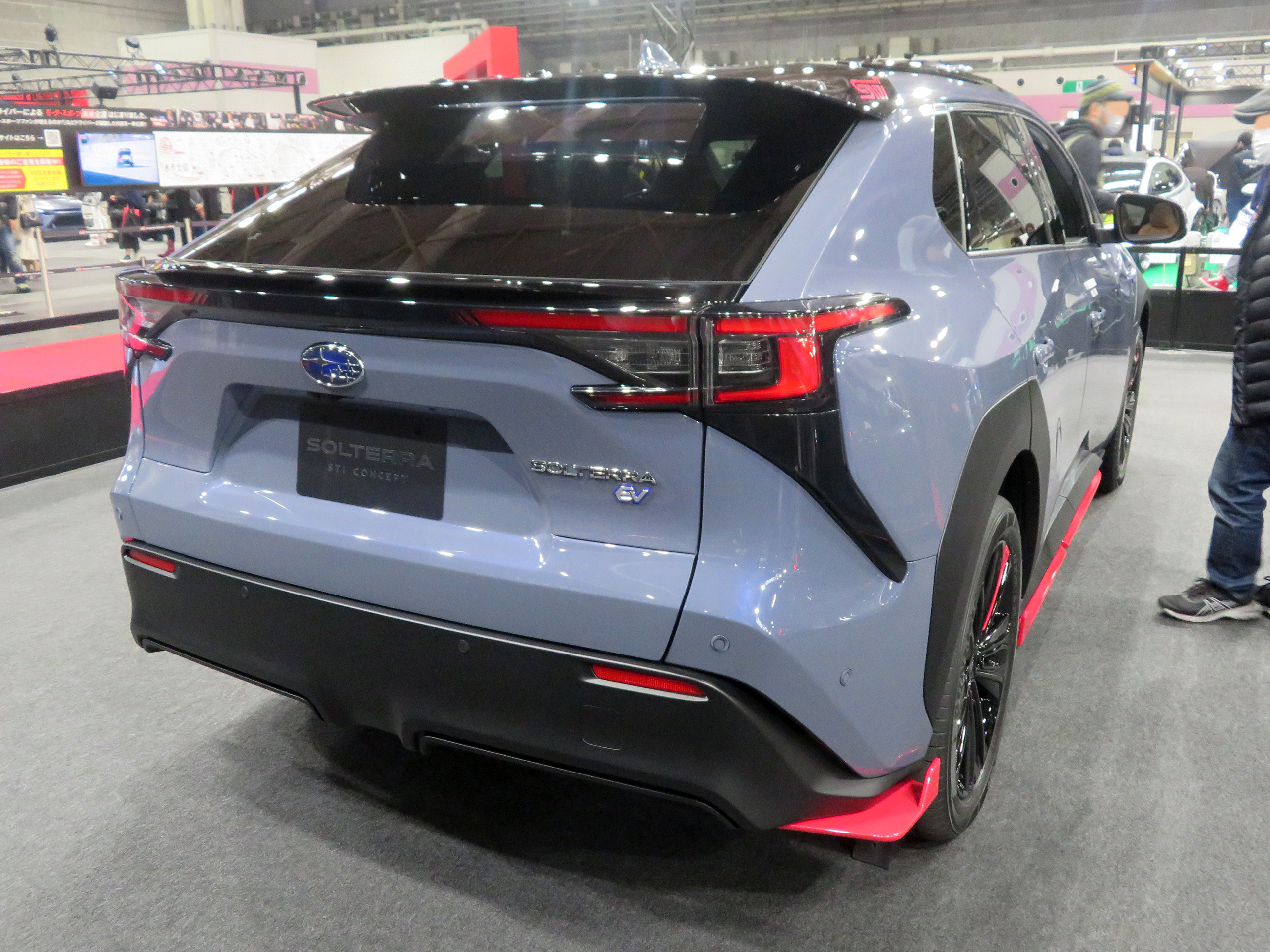
Rear view

=== Facelift ===
The facelifted Solterra was unveiled at the April 2025 New York Auto Show for the 2026 model year. It received a new front end and a 25 percent range improvement over the pre-facelift model. Power was also increased to 233 hp (236 PS) thanks to stronger front and rear motors. The battery size was also increased to 74.7 kWh. A new Solterra XT trim added more powerful dual electric motors, producing a combined power output of 338 hp (343 PS).

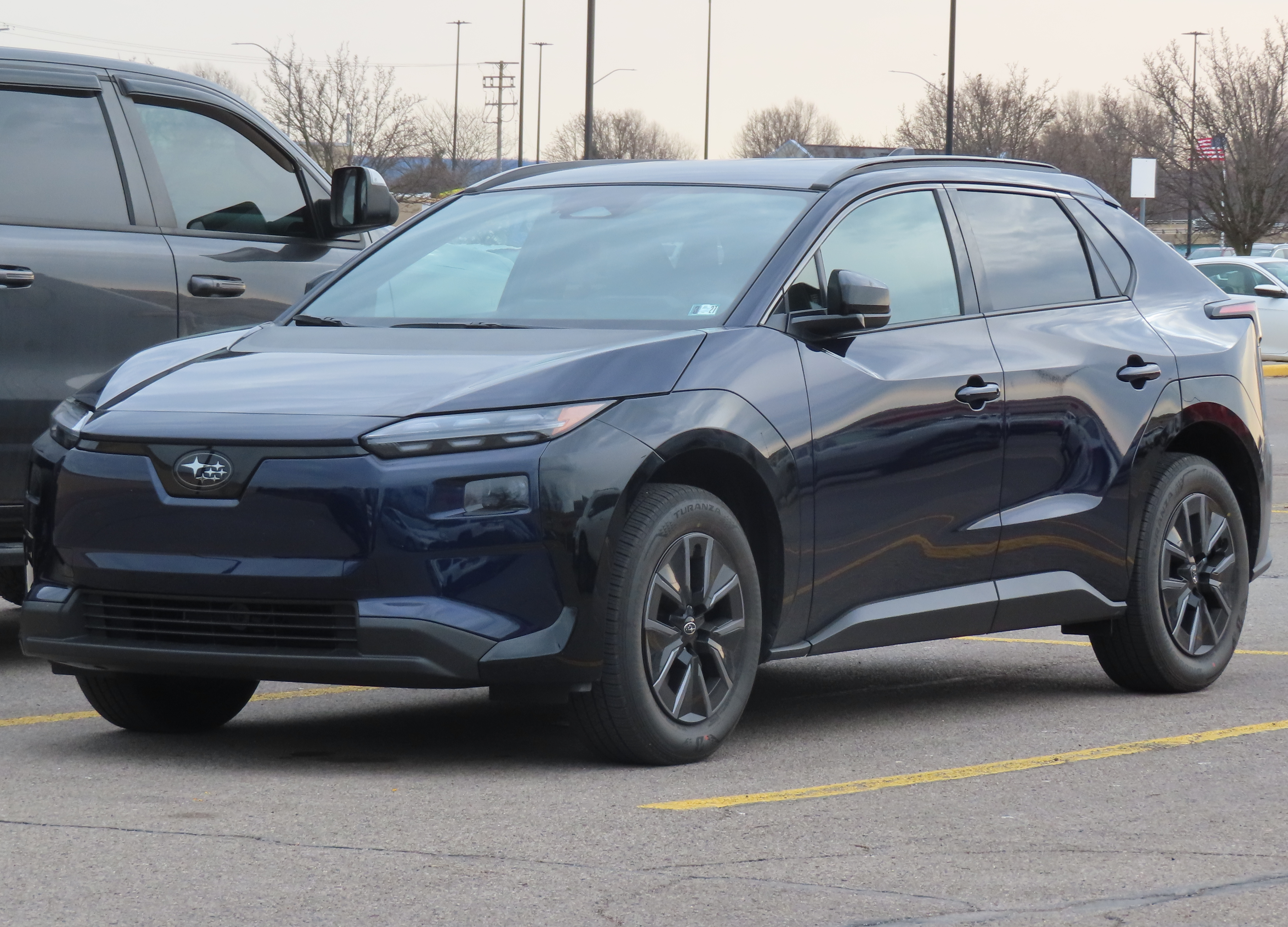
Subaru Solterra (facelift)

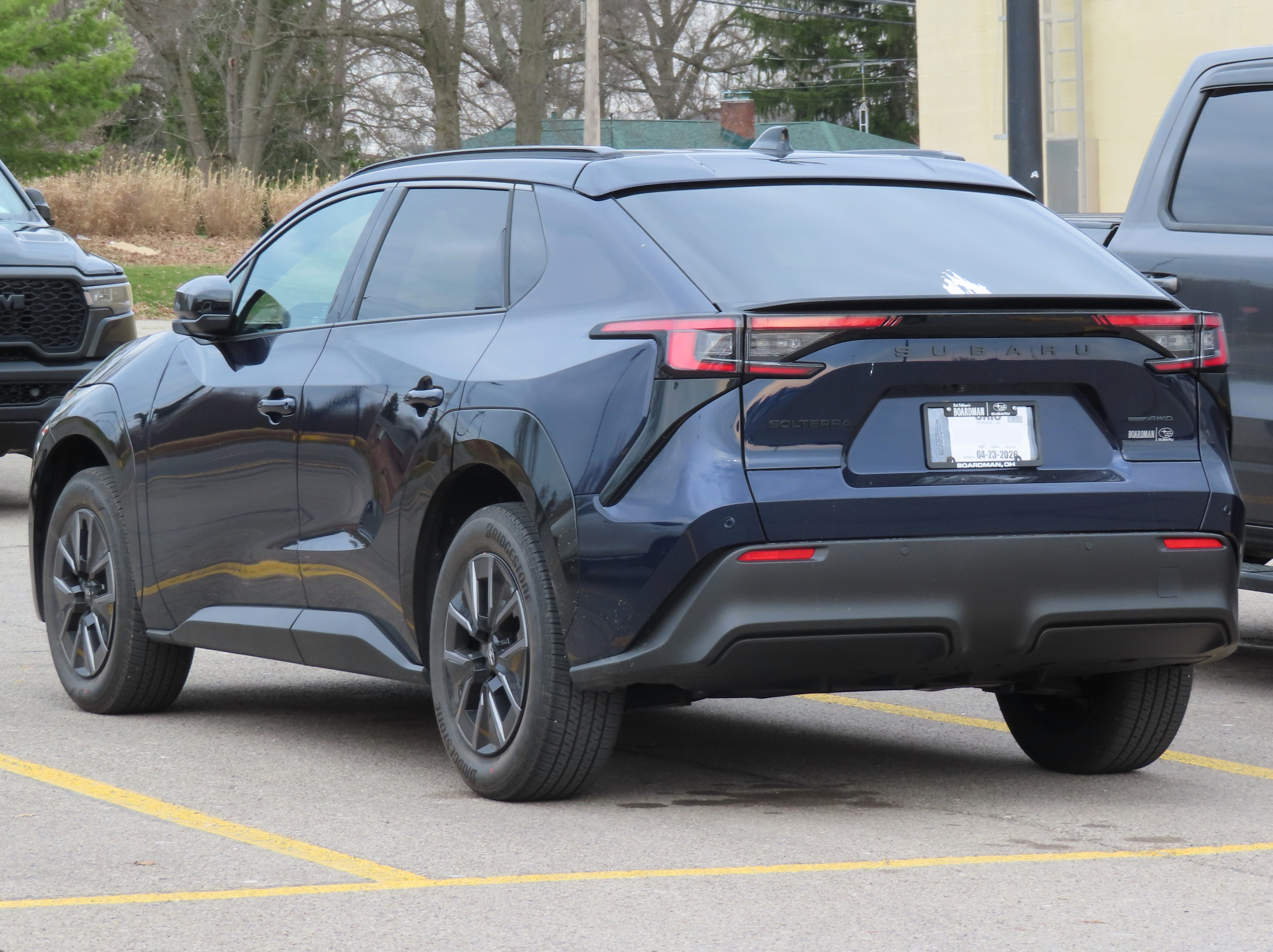
Rear view (facelift)

== bZ4X Touring / bZ Woodland / Subaru Trailseeker / Subaru E-Outback ==
Toyota bZ4X Touring
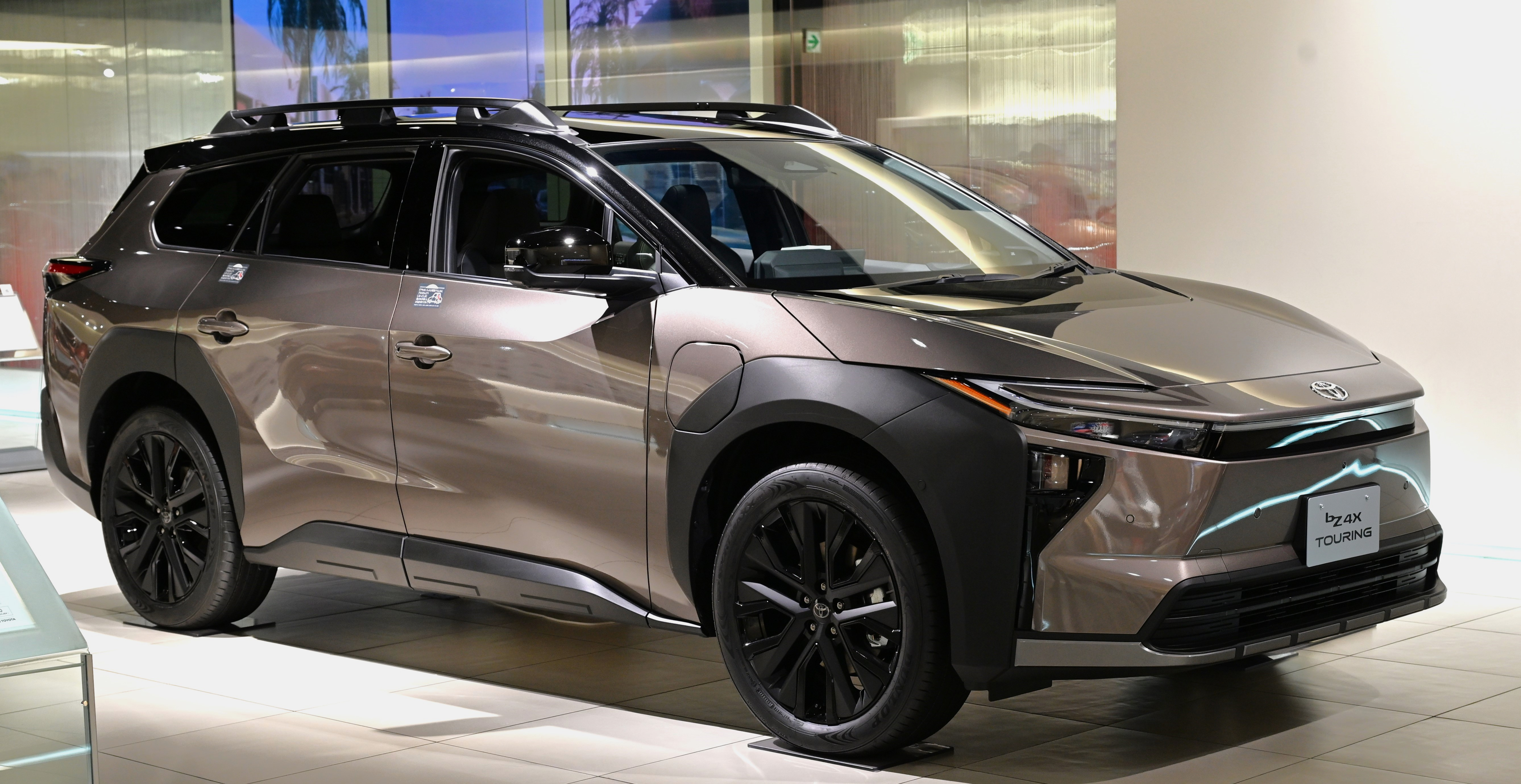

Overview
- Model code: EA10
- Also called: Toyota bZ Woodland (North America); Subaru Trailseeker (North America, Japan and Australia); Subaru E-Outback (Europe, Singapore and Taiwan)
- Production: February 2026 – present
- Model years: 2026–present
- Assembly: Japan: Ōta, Gunma (Subaru Corp. Yajima Plant)

Body and chassis
- Class: Mid-size crossover SUV
- Body style: 5-door SUV
- Layout: Front-motor, front-wheel-drive; Dual-motor, all-wheel-drive
- Platform: e-TNGA/e-SGP
- Related: Toyota C-HR+/C-HR / Subaru Uncharted; Lexus RZ

Powertrain
- Electric motor: 2XM Permanent magnet synchronous
- Power output: 224–375 hp (167–280 kW; 227–380 PS)
- Transmission: BluE Nexus "eAxle"
- Battery: 74.7 kWh lithium-ion

Dimensions
- Wheelbase: 2,850 mm (112.2 in)
- Length: 4,830 mm (190.2 in); 4,845 mm (190.7 in) (Trailseeker)
- Width: 1,860 mm (73.2 in)
- Height: 1,670 mm (65.7 in)

A lengthened version of the bZ4X/bZ was introduced as the bZ Woodland (North America) and the bZ4X Touring (Europe) on 15 May 2025. A Subaru version called the Subaru Trailseeker (North America, Japan and Australia) and the Subaru E-Outback (Europe) were introduced earlier, on 16 April 2025. It is based on the refreshed version of the bZ4X/bZ (2026 model year for North America).

Compared to the standard bZ4X, the bZ4X Touring / bZ Woodland is 140 mm (5.5 in) longer, 20 mm (0.79 in) taller for additional cargo space, and has standard roof rails. It has a single battery option, the 74.7 kWh pack.

The vehicle's AWD system includes driving modes for Snow/Dirt and Deep Snow/Mud. It is also equipped with hill descent control and 8.3 inches (210 mm) of ground clearance. Towing capacity is rated at 3,500 pounds (1,590 kg).

The interior features a 14-inch touchscreen with wireless Android Auto and Apple CarPlay compatibility. There are two 15W wireless smartphone chargers upfront and two fast USB-C chargers for the rear occupants.

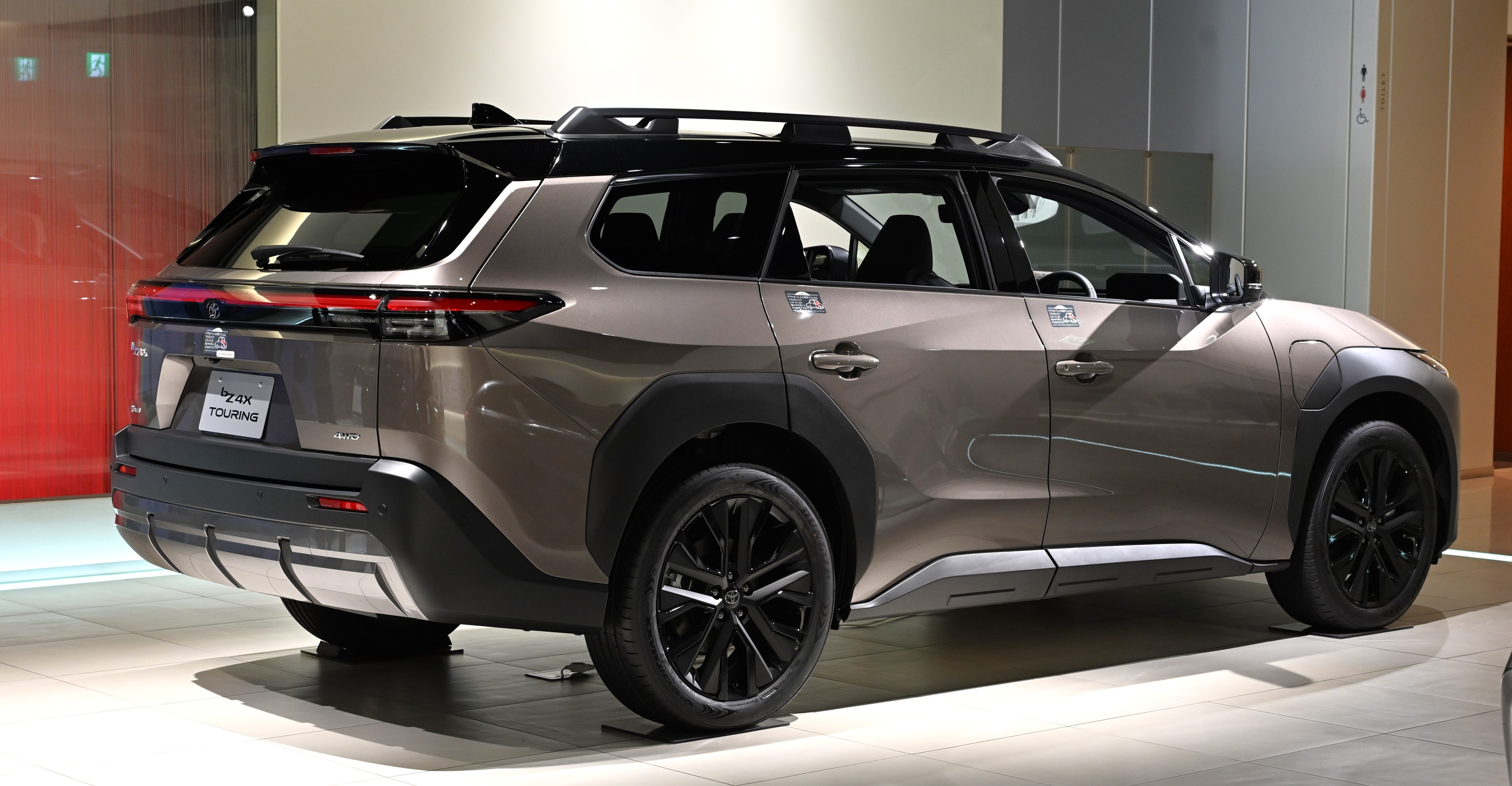
Rear view

Interior

=== Markets ===
==== Australia ====
The Trailseeker went on sale in Australia on 10 April 2026, it is available with AWD and AWD Touring variants.

The bZ4X Touring went on sale in Australia on 15 April 2026, in the sole AWD variant.

==== Europe ====
In Europe, the extended-length model is marketed as the bZ4X Touring. It will be released in 2026 with front-wheel drive and all-wheel drive options.

The Subaru version is marketed in Europe as the E-Outback, as Subaru chose to not continue to market the internal-combustion Outback model in Europe due to its high CO2 emissions, as the seventh generation ICE Outback is unable to meet the Euro 7 emissions standards.

Subaru E-Outback (Europe)

Subaru E-Outback (Europe)

Interior

==== Japan ====
The Japanese spec bZ4X Touring was launched on 25 February 2026. The bZ4X Touring is available in a sole variant, Z, with front-wheel drive and all-wheel drive options.

Pre-orders of the Trailseeker commenced on 9 April 2026. It was offered in ET-SS and ET-HS. The ET-HS was available in front-wheel drive and four-wheel drive layouts, while the ET-SS was only available in a front-wheel drive layout.

==== North America ====
In North America, both the Toyota bZ Woodland and Subaru Trailseeker are offered. Both models are only offered as all-wheel drive, and the bZ Woodland is only marketed in a single fully equipped trim.

Compared to the Toyota version, the Subaru Trailseeker has a differentiated front fascia design with redesigned headlights. At the rear, it has 3D "SUBARU" lettering and rear gate garnish on the rear fascia.

The cruising range for both the Toyota bZ Woodland and Subaru Trailseeker is estimated at 420 km (260 miles), which is slightly less than the 2026 Toyota bZ / Subaru Solterra at 459 km (285 miles). A standard NACS charge port at the right fender of the vehicle allows for recharging at Tesla Supercharger stations, and the maximum DC charging rate is 150 kW.

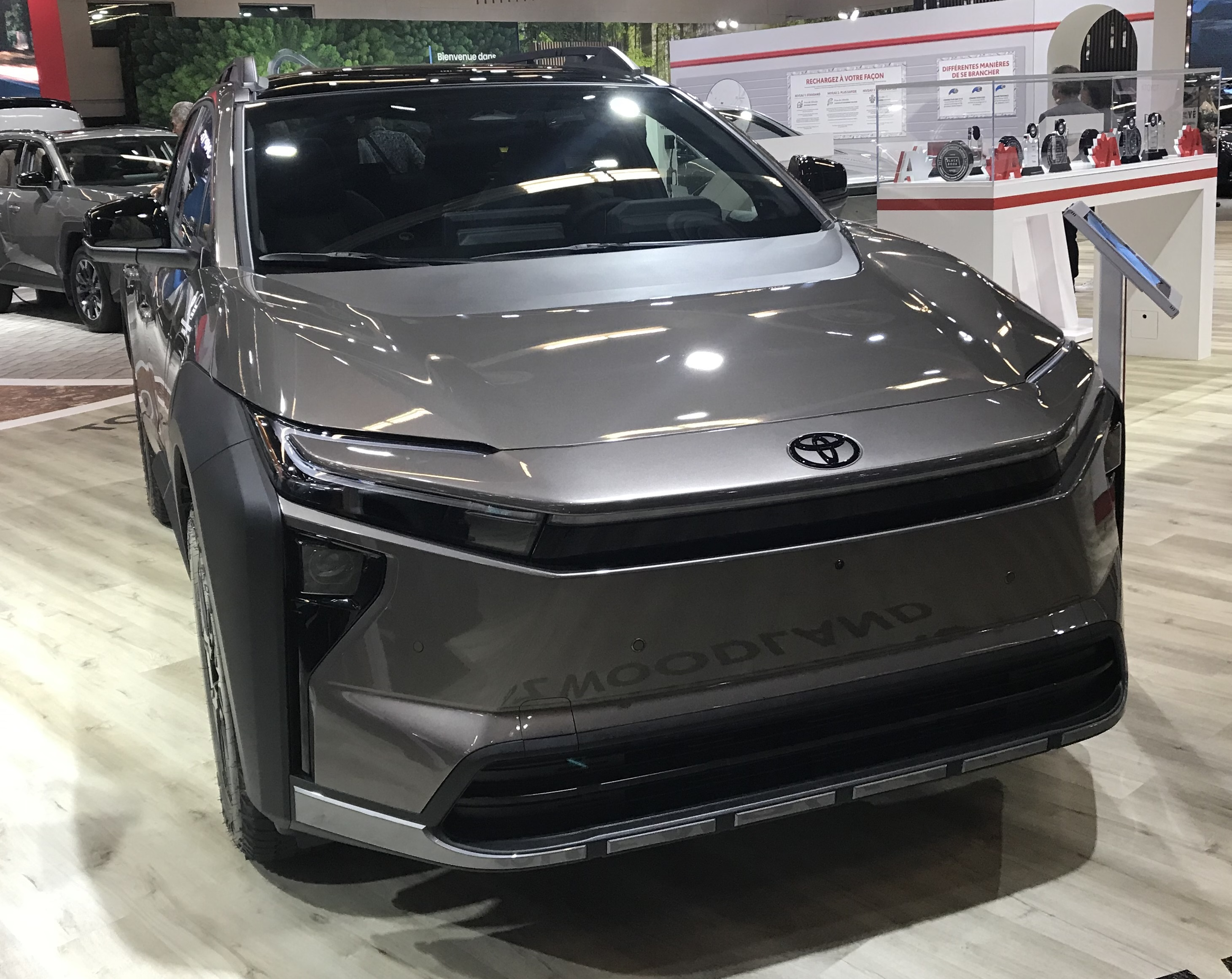
Toyota bZ Woodland

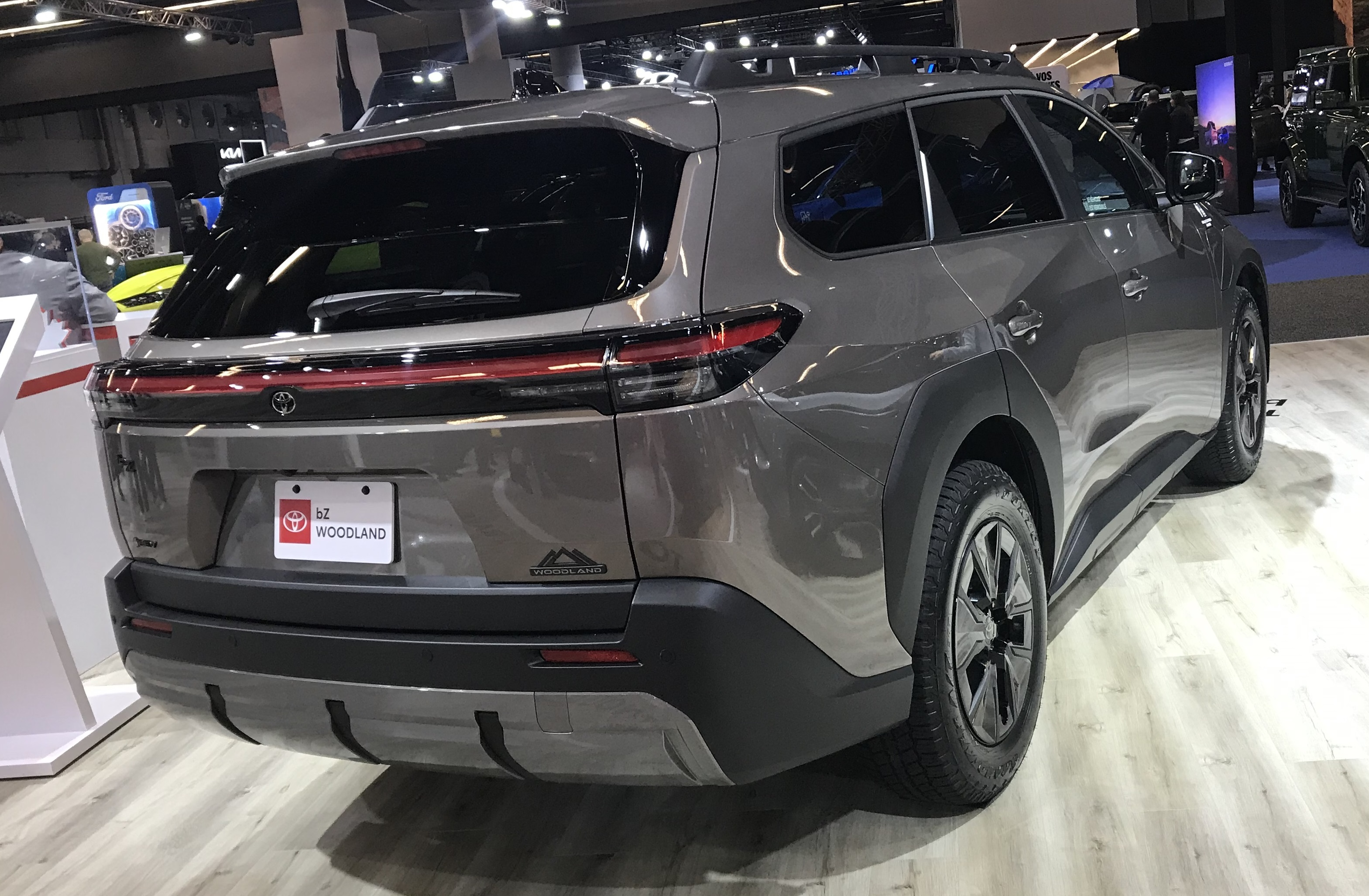
bZ Woodland (rear view)

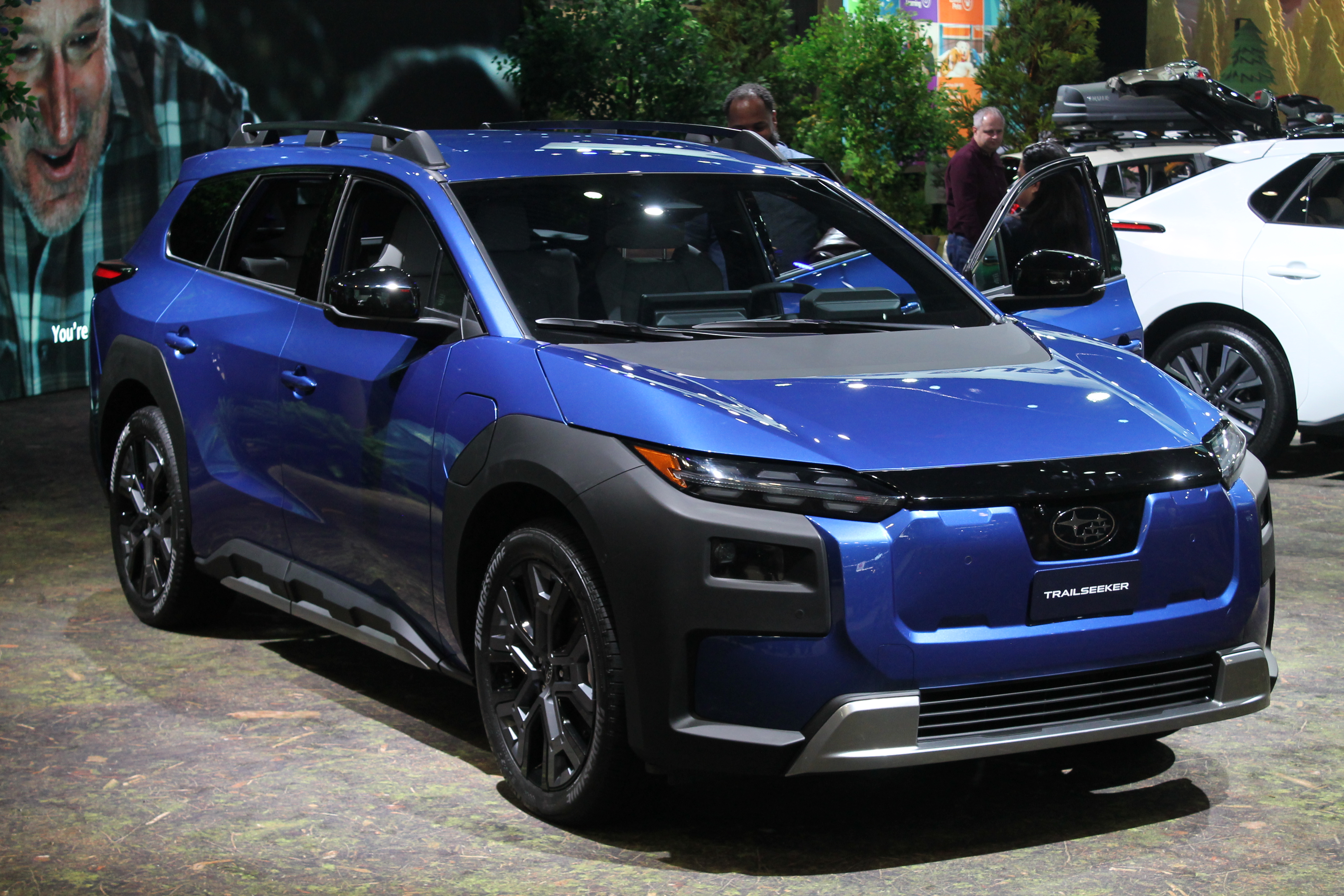
Subaru Trailseeker

==== Southeast Asia ====
The Subaru version is marketed as the E-Outback in Singapore and was launched on 5 May 2026, in the sole AWD variant, featuring a 74.7kWh battery which offers up to 443km of driving range. The seventh generation ICE-powered Outback model is not sold in Singapore due to it not meeting Singapore's stringent automotive emissions standards as well as Singapore's Certificate of Entitlement regulations.

The bZ4X Touring was launched in Indonesia on 29 July 2026 at the 33rd Gaikindo Indonesia International Auto Show, in the sole AWD variant.

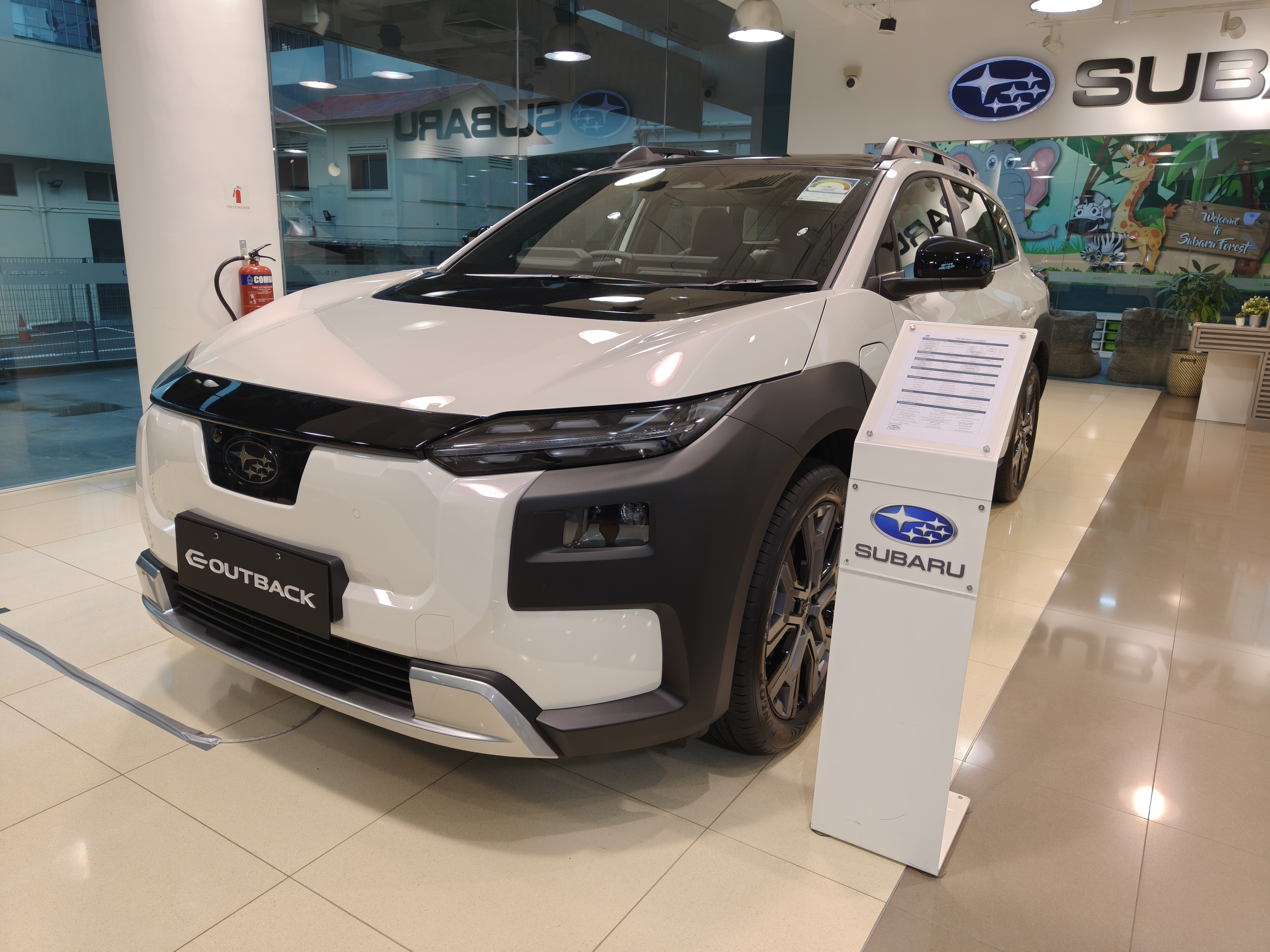
Subaru E-Outback (Singapore)

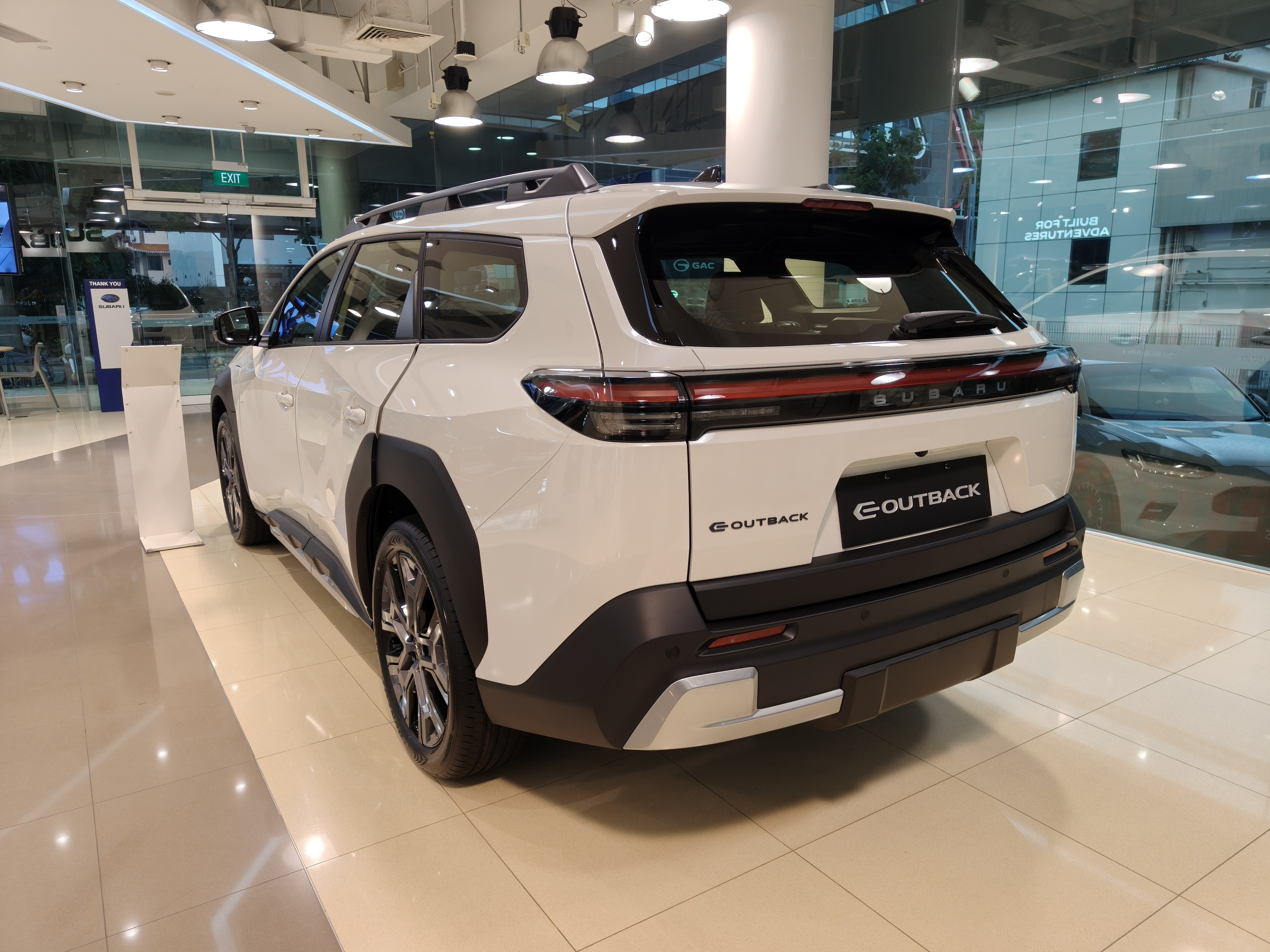
Subaru E-Outback (Singapore)

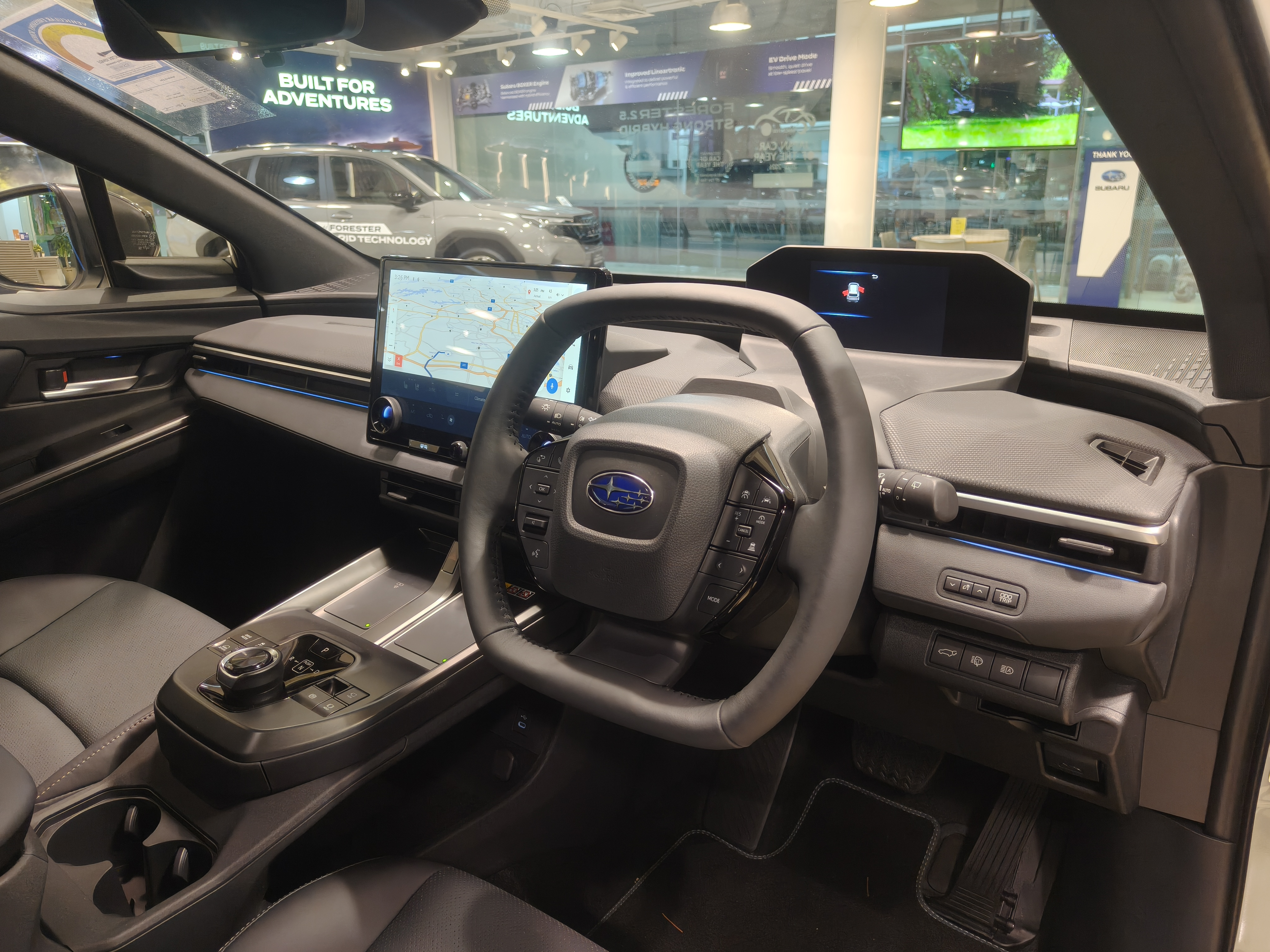
Interior (Singapore)

==== South Africa ====
The bZ4X Touring was launched in South Africa on 3 July 2026, alongside the bZ4X. In South Africa, the Touring is the more powerful of the two vehicles, providing a total system output of 334 kW and 438 Nm. Compared to the standard bZ4X, the Touring uses a slightly larger 74.7 kWh lithium battery, providing a marginally increased WLTP range of up to 487 km (305 miles).

==== Middle East ====
The bZ4X Touring was unveiled in the Middle East on 27 September 2026 in Amman, Jordan; in Iraq on 4 October 2026; in Qatar on 6 October 2026 at the Lexus Main Showroom in Doha, during an exclusive preview ahead of the public Al Abdulghani Motor Show 2026 from 7 to 10 October 2026; and in the United Arab Emirates on 20 October 2026. In Jordan, Iraq and the United Arab Emirates, it was unveiled alongside the sixth-generation RAV4 Plug-in Hybrid, while it was not unveiled alongside the sixth-generation RAV4 Plug-in Hybrid in Qatar.

==== Taiwan ====
The E-Outback Pre-orders commenced on 16 October 2026 in Taiwan. The 7th generation ICE Outback is not sold in Taiwan due to it not being able to meet Taiwan's automotive emissions standards.

== Safety ==
On 23 June 2022, Toyota and Subaru recalled 2,700 bZ4Xs and 2,600 Solterras due to the possibility that wheels could come loose. They also halted production and sales of any new models.

On 6 October 2022, Toyota reported it has found a fix to the loose wheel recall and has resumed production of the bZ4X and Solterra.

=== Euro NCAP ===
The bZ4X and the Solterra also achieved a five-star 2022 Euro NCAP rating.

Euro NCAP test results Toyota bZ4X (LHD) (2022)
| Test | Points | % |
|---|---|---|
| Overall: | 5 /5 stars | |
| Adult occupant: | 33.7 | 88% |
| Child occupant: | 43 | 87% |
| Pedestrian: | 42.8 | 79% |
| Safety assist: | 14.7 | 91% |

Euro NCAP test results Toyota bZ4X (LHD) (2025)
| Test | Points | % |
|---|---|---|
| Overall: | 5 /5 stars | |
| Adult occupant: | 35.5 | 88% |
| Child occupant: | 41.9 | 85% |
| Pedestrian: | 50.5 | 80% |
| Safety assist: | 14.4 | 79% |

=== IIHS ===
The 2025 model year bZ4x was awarded as the "Top Safety Pick+" by the US IIHS.

IIHS scores (2025 model year)
| Small overlap front | Good |
| Moderate overlap front (original test) | Good |
| Moderate overlap front (updated test) | Good |
| Side impact (updated test) | Good |
| Headlights (Limited and XLE trims after 2025) | Good |
| Headlights (XLE trim before 2025) | Marginal |
| Front crash prevention: pedestrian | Superior |
| Seatbelt reminders | Superior |
| Child restraint LATCH ease of use | Good+ |

=== NASVA ===
The bZ4X and Solterra achieved a five star JNCAP rating from Japan's National Agency for Automotive Safety and Victim's Aid (NASVA) for comprehensive safety performance, based on testing conducted on a Subaru Solterra.

NASVA New Car Assessment - 2022 Toyota bZ4X
| Section | Score |
|---|---|
| Collision safety performance | A (87%) |
| Preventive safety performance | A (99%) |
| Comprehensive safety performance | 93% |
| Overall evaluation | 5/5 stars |

=== ANCAP ===
ANCAP test results Subaru Solterra (2022, aligned with Euro NCAP)
| Test | Points | % |
|---|---|---|
| Overall: | 5 /5 stars | |
| Adult occupant: | 33.69 | 88% |
| Child occupant: | 43.43 | 88% |
| Pedestrian: | 42.76 | 79% |
| Safety assist: | 14.90 | 93% |

ANCAP test results Toyota bZ4X (2022, aligned with Euro NCAP)
| Test | Points | % |
|---|---|---|
| Overall: | 5 /5 stars | |
| Adult occupant: | 33.69 | 88% |
| Child occupant: | 43.43 | 88% |
| Pedestrian: | 42.76 | 79% |
| Safety assist: | 14.90 | 93% |

ANCAP test results Toyota bZ4X (2025, aligned with Euro NCAP)
| Test | Points | % |
|---|---|---|
| Overall: | 5 /5 stars | |
| Adult occupant: | 35.48 | 88% |
| Child occupant: | 41.36 | 86% |
| Pedestrian: | 50.47 | 80% |
| Safety assist: | 14.86 | 82% |

ANCAP test results Subaru Solterra (2025, aligned with Euro NCAP)
| Test | Points | % |
|---|---|---|
| Overall: | 5 /5 stars | |
| Adult occupant: | 35.48 | 88% |
| Child occupant: | 41.36 | 86% |
| Pedestrian: | 50.47 | 80% |
| Safety assist: | 14.86 | 82% |

ANCAP test results Subaru Trailseeker (2025, aligned with Euro NCAP)
| Test | Points | % |
|---|---|---|
| Overall: | 5 /5 stars | |
| Adult occupant: | 35.60 | 89% |
| Child occupant: | 42.43 | 86% |
| Pedestrian: | 50.47 | 80% |
| Safety assist: | 14.86 | 82% |

== Sales ==
=== Toyota bZ4X ===
| Year | Japan | Europe | Australia | China | US | Canada | Indonesia |
|---|---|---|---|---|---|---|---|
| 2022 | | 2,382 | | 1,487 | 1,220 | | 1 |
| 2023 | 138 | 19,606 | | 12,121 | 9,329 | 4,179 | 479 |
| 2024 | 927 | 24,465 | 977 | 4,998 | 18,570 | 6,720 | 60 |
| 2025 | 3,663 | 27,191 | | 1,263 | 15,609 | | 77 |

=== Subaru Solterra ===
| Year | Japan | Australia | US | Canada |
|---|---|---|---|---|
| 2022 | 105 | | 919 | |
| 2023 | 632 | 14 | 8,872 | |
| 2024 | 225 | 386 | 12,447 | 2,468 |
| 2025 | 264 | | 10,715 | |

== See also ==
- List of Toyota vehicles
- List of Subaru vehicles
