= X-Mode social =

Location tracking company

X-Mode Social
- Industry: Data broker
- Founded: 2013
- Founder: Joshua Anton
- Headquarters: Reston, Virginia
- Key people: Joshua Anton (CEO), Jacob Ellenburg (co-founder and chief marketing officer), Peter Connolly (data manager)
- Website: https://xmode.io/, https://outlogic.io/

Founded in 2013, X-Mode Social is a US company based in Reston, Virginia.

X-Mode specializes in the collection of smartphone-location datasets. In August 2021, the company was bought by Digital Envoy and subsequently rebranded as Outlogic.

== Company history ==
Joshua Anton, a student at the University of Virginia, created a mobile application named Drunk Mode to prevent users from dialing phone numbers or texting while inebriated. The application was free and had more than one million downloads. He came up with the idea of collecting data from the application's users and reselling it to advertisers, and he founded X-Mode in 2013.

X-Mode offers a software development kit (SDK), which is a small piece of code that, once embedded into a given application, allows X-Mode to receive copies of the location data of the smartphone (thereby pinpointing the co-ordinates of the person who is carrying the smartphone). In total, X-Mode's SDK is present in the apps from more than 70 developers on more than 300 applications such as games, travel guides, and dating sites. In total, more than 50 million active people per month are sharing their location every 5 to 7 minutes with X-Mode.

The smartphone-location datasets are derived from GPS data, data from Bluetooth signals emitted by the phone and picked up via detection beacons, and data from Wi-Fi routers (especially inside buildings). Users are able to turn off this data-sharing by adjusting the permission settings on their smartphone. X-Mode is one of a number of firms which provide smartphone-tracking capabilities and data collection.

Because X-Mode pays money to developers to incorporate its location-tracking SDK into mobile applications, this provides a source of revenue for developers: $0.03 per U.S user per month, and $0.005 per international user. 25 million active users in the U.S. and 40 million more worldwide are tracked through more than 400 different apps. Another example, in September 2018, the company offered $100,000 to Scruff, a dating site for gay and bisexual men, to integrate its library into the code, which its founder refused.

In spring 2020, the company made a demonstration (using the location-tracking datasets from phones of users) showing how, when social distancing is neglected, COVID-19 infections can spread. In order to facilitate the monitoring of compliance with home quarantine orders, the company shares location data with federal agencies such as the Centers for Disease Control and Prevention.

== Critics ==
In November 2020, an article published by Vice reported that data from Muslim Pro, an application for Muslims that had been downloaded 98 million times, were allegedly shared by X-Mode with a U.S. military intelligence contractor. Muslim Pro then announced that it would stop transferring this data to X-Mode and user complaints were filed in France and the United Kingdom.

In December 2020, Google and Apple asked the developers to remove the SDK from any code otherwise their apps will be eliminated from their app stores.

In January 2022, an analysis made by The Markup indicated that 107 applications in 140 countries for which X-mode sent location data to X-mode. For some apps, the X-mode SDK was not necessary, the data was sent directly to the data broker.

In January 2024, the Federal Trade Commission charged X-Mode for failing to obtain consumer consent for sensitive raw location data the company was selling, stating how X-Mode "did not have any policies in place to remove sensitive locations from the raw location data it sold".
