= Nathan Patterson (baseball) =

American baseball player (born 1996)

- Pitcher
- Born: February 5, 1996 (age 30); Kansas City, Missouri, U.S.
- Bats: Right Throws: Right

Nathan Patterson (born February 5, 1996) is an American former professional baseball pitcher. Patterson attracted national media attention for throwing a fastball at 96 miles per hour in a carnival-style pitching game at a ballpark, video of which became popular and directly led to the signing of a minor league contract with the Oakland Athletics. He later played in the Milwaukee Brewers organization before retiring.

== Early life ==
Patterson was born in 1996 in Kansas City, Missouri. His mother is a long-time nurse and real estate agent and his father a former high school baseball coach in Overland Park, Kansas. He played baseball as a middle infielder on the junior varsity team at Overland Park, but suffered a fracture in the elbow of his throwing arm during his junior year and never recovered sufficiently from the injury to resume his high school career. He enrolled in a local community college before leaving to start his own landscaping business.

Patterson moved to Austin, Texas, in the summer of 2015 and met his girlfriend, with whom he relocated to Nashville, Tennessee, in January 2018. There he worked as a salesman of computer software.

== Professional career ==
In August 2018, Patterson was attending a Nashville Sounds game with his father and a friend, who convinced him to throw in a speed pitch game set up on the concourse of First Tennessee Park.

Patterson recalled:

"I hadn’t thrown a ball in years. We're all hanging out, having a great time. My friend and dad go, 'Hey, let's go in the speed-pitch and throw a ball.' All right, let's go have a little fun here.

"My buddy hit 65 (mph), something like that. I stepped in next, first ball was 90, I was blown away. Honestly, I thought it was a joke, I thought they just jacked up the gun just to make you pay another dollar to throw another ball. I threw about five balls, and the last one I threw was 96 miles an hour. It just blew my mind, honestly."

The impressive velocity inspired Patterson to resume training for a possible return to baseball. He signed with a sports agent who put him in touch with Jarrod Parker, a former pitcher for the A's, who worked with Patterson on his pitching technique. Patterson's long-shot effort was sidetracked in December 2018 when he was hit by a car and forced to undergo surgery on his left, non-throwing wrist.

Having assured himself that he was on the path to full recovery, Patterson contacted the Oakland Athletics, parent major league team of the Nashville Sounds, in February 2019 and joined an amateur baseball team to hone his skill. On July 15, 2019, Patterson made a trip to Coors Field, home of the major league Colorado Rockies and lit up another fan-pitch speed booth with another 96 mph fastball. Video of his achievement came to the attention of pitching talent evaluator Rob Friedman, known as "the pitching ninja," and a few days later Patterson was contacted by the A's with an offer for an entry-level minor league contract. Video of Patterson had previously been featured on Friedman's FlatGroundApp in January 2019.

=== Oakland Athletics ===
Patterson signed a minor league contract with the Oakland Athletics on July 31, 2019. He was assigned to the rookie-level Athletics Green of the Arizona League on August 5. Patterson was reassigned to the Athletics Gold on August 15 and pitched in his first professional game that evening. He struck out all three batters he faced. In addition to a fastball, Patterson featured a slider clocked in the 80s. In 3 games for the AZL Athletics, he compiled an 0-1 record and 4.76 ERA with 8 strikeouts across 5 2/3 innings pitched.

Patterson did not play in a game in 2020 due to the cancellation of the minor league season because of the COVID-19 pandemic. On November 18, 2020, Patterson was released by the Athletics organization.

=== Milwaukee Brewers ===
On February 2, 2021, Patterson signed a minor league contract with the Milwaukee Brewers organization. He appeared in five games for the High-A Wisconsin Timber Rattlers pitching 4 1/3 innings of relief while accumulating a 13.50 earned run average. Patterson elected to retire from baseball on May 27.
