= 2016 Philadelphia Phillies season =

Major League Baseball season

2016 Philadelphia Phillies
- League: National League
- Division: East
- Ballpark: Citizens Bank Park
- City: Philadelphia, Pennsylvania
- Record: 71–91 (.438)
- Divisional place: 4th
- Owners: Bill Giles; David Montgomery
- General managers: Matt Klentak
- Managers: Pete Mackanin
- Television: Comcast SportsNet Philadelphia; Comcast Network Philadelphia; NBC Philadelphia (Tom McCarthy, Ben Davis, Matt Stairs, Mike Schmidt, Gregg Murphy)
- Radio: Phillies Radio Network; WIP 94.1 FM (English) (Scott Franzke, Larry Andersen, Jim Jackson); WTTM (Spanish) (Danny Martinez, Bill Kulik, Rickie Ricardo)
- Stats: ESPN.com; Baseball Reference

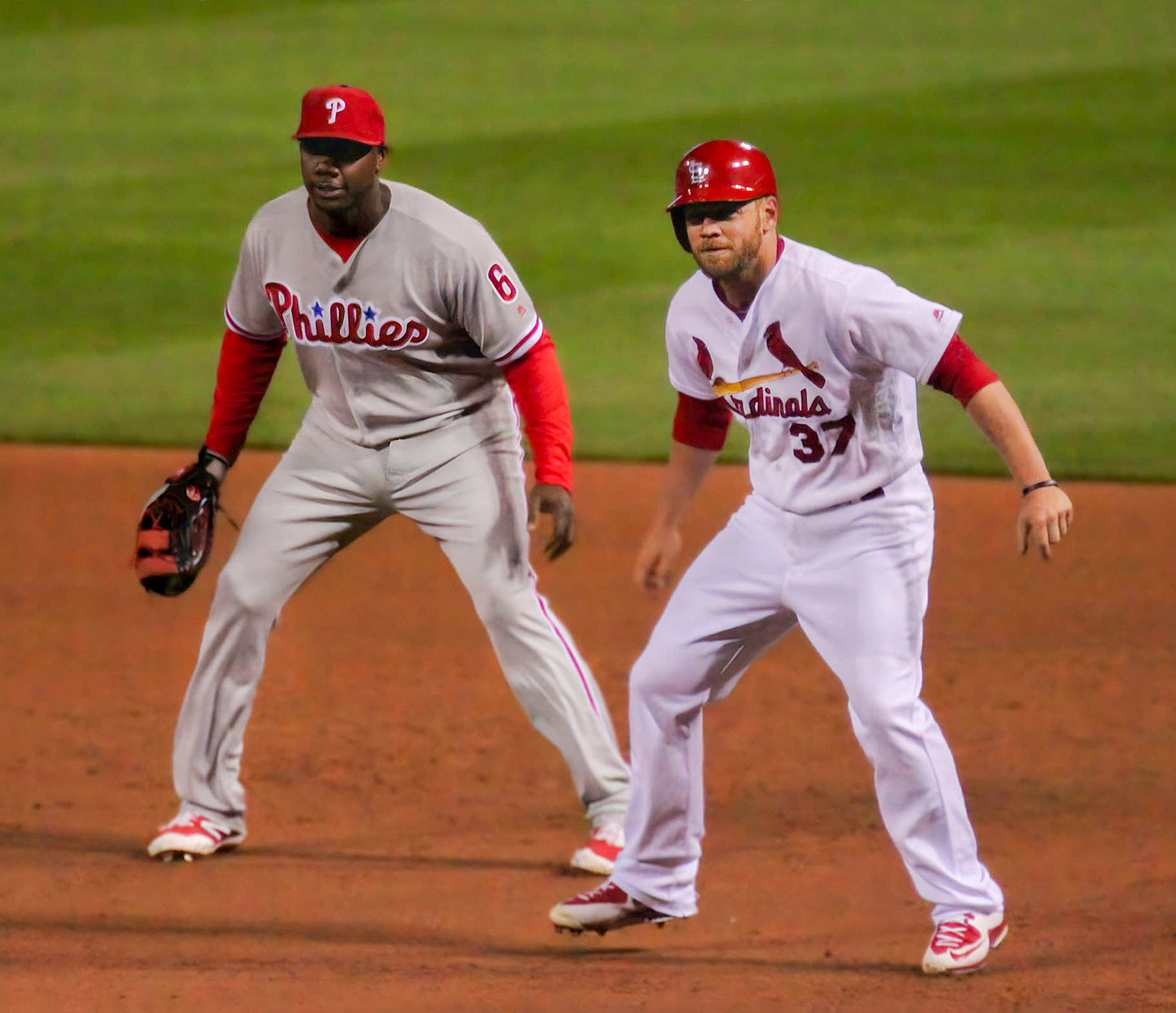
Ryan Howard (left) and Brandon Moss in 2016.

The 2016 Philadelphia Phillies season was the 134th season in the history of the franchise, and its 13th season at Citizens Bank Park. They improved upon their 63–99 (.389) mark from the year before and finished with a record of 71–91 (.438) and fourth place in the National League East. They missed the playoffs for the fifth consecutive season.

== Offseason ==
=== Arrivals ===
Name	Position	Former team	Transaction type	Notes	Reference
David Hernandez	RP	Diamondbacks	Free agent	Signed one-year contract in December	
Emmanuel Burriss	IF	Nationals	Free agent	Spent most of 2015 season in AAA	
Chris Leroux	RP	Yankees	Free agent	Spent most of 2015 season in AAA	
Ryan Jackson	IF	Angels	Free agent	Came from Angels, where new Phillies general manager Matt Klentak was assistant GM	
Jeremy Hellickson	SP	Diamondbacks	Trade	Acquired in exchange for prospect Sam McWilliams	
James Russell	RP	Cubs	Free agent	Spent most of 2015 season in Cubs' bullpen	
Dan Otero	RP	Athletics	Waivers	Spent most of 2015 season in Athletics' bullpen	

== Season standings ==
=== National League East ===
NL East
Team	W	L	Pct.	GB	Home	Road
Washington Nationals	95	67	.586	—	50‍–‍31	45‍–‍36
New York Mets	87	75	.537	8	44‍–‍37	43‍–‍38
Miami Marlins	79	82	.491	15½	40‍–‍40	39‍–‍42
Philadelphia Phillies	71	91	.438	24	37‍–‍44	34‍–‍47
Atlanta Braves	68	93	.422	26½	31‍–‍50	37‍–‍43

=== National League Wild Card ===
Division leaders
Team	W	L	Pct.
Chicago Cubs	103	58	.640
Washington Nationals	95	67	.586
Los Angeles Dodgers	91	71	.562

Wild Card teams (Top 2 teams qualify for postseason)
Team	W	L	Pct.	GB
New York Mets	87	75	.537	—
San Francisco Giants	87	75	.537	—
St. Louis Cardinals	86	76	.531	1
Miami Marlins	79	82	.491	7½
Pittsburgh Pirates	78	83	.484	8½
Colorado Rockies	75	87	.463	12
Milwaukee Brewers	73	89	.451	14
Philadelphia Phillies	71	91	.438	16
Arizona Diamondbacks	69	93	.426	18
Atlanta Braves	68	93	.422	18½
San Diego Padres	68	94	.420	19
Cincinnati Reds	68	94	.420	19

=== Record vs. opponents ===
2016 National League record Source: MLB Standings Grid – 2016
Team	AZ	ATL	CHC	CIN	COL	LAD	MIA	MIL	NYM	PHI	PIT	SD	SF	STL	WSH	AL
Arizona	—	5–2	2–5	3–3	10–9	7–12	2–4	3–4	5–1	4–3	1–5	10–9	6–13	4–3	2–5	5–15
Atlanta	2–5	—	3–3	3–4	1–6	1–5	11–7	2–5	10–9	11–8	3–4	4–2	3–4	2–4	4–15	8–12
Chicago	5–2	3–3	—	15–4	2–4	4–3	4–3	11–8	2–5	5–1	14–4	4–2	4–3	10–9	5–2	15–5
Cincinnati	3–3	4–3	4–15	—	5–2	2–5	3–4	11–8	0–6	4–2	9–10	3–4	3–3	9–10	3–4	5–15
Colorado	9–10	6–1	4–2	2–5	—	7–12	2–5	1–5	6–1	2–5	2–5	10–9	9–10	2–4	4–2	9–11
Los Angeles	12–7	5–1	3–4	5–2	12–7	—	1–6	5–2	4–3	4–2	2–5	11–8	8–11	4–2	5–1	10–10
Miami	4–2	7–11	3–4	4–3	5–2	6–1	—	4–2	7–12	9–10	6–1	3–3	2–4	4–3	9–10	6–14
Milwaukee	4–3	5–2	8–11	8–11	5–1	2–5	2–4	—	2–5	3–4	9–10	3–4	1–5	6–13	4–2	11–9
New York	1–5	9–10	5–2	6–0	1–6	3–4	12–7	5–2	—	12–7	3–3	4–3	4–3	3–3	7–12	12–8
Philadelphia	3–4	8–11	1–5	2–4	5–2	2–4	10–9	4–3	7–12	—	3–4	5–2	3–3	2–5	5–14	11–9
Pittsburgh	5–1	4–3	4–14	10–9	5–2	5–2	1–6	10–9	3–3	4–3	—	3–3	4–3	9–10	2–4	9–11
San Diego	9–10	2–4	2–4	4–3	9–10	8–11	3–3	4–3	3–4	2–5	3–3	—	8–11	1–6	4–3	6–14
San Francisco	13–6	4–3	3–4	3–3	10–9	11–8	4–2	5–1	3–4	3–3	3–4	11–8	—	3–4	3–4	8–12
St. Louis	3–4	4–2	9–10	10–9	4–2	2–4	3–4	13–6	3–3	5–2	10–9	6–1	4–3	—	2–5	8–12
Washington	5–2	15–4	2–5	4–3	2–4	1–5	10–9	2–4	12–7	14–5	4–2	3–4	4–3	5–2	—	12–8

=== Game log ===
Legend
	Phillies win
	Phillies loss
	Postponement
**Bold**	Phillies team member

2016 Game Log (71–91)
April (14–10)

#	Date	Opponent	Score	Win	Loss	Save	Attendance	Record
1	April 4	@ Reds	2–6	Ross Ohlendorf (1–0)	**David Hernandez** (0–1)	—	43,683	0–1
2	April 6	@ Reds	2–3	Blake Wood (1–0)	**Dalier Hinojosa** (0–1)	—	21,621	0–2
3	April 7	@ Reds	6–10	Robert Stephenson (1–0)	**Charlie Morton** (0–1)	—	10,784	0–3
4	April 8	@ Mets	2–7	Jacob deGrom (1–0)	**Jerad Eickhoff** (0–1)	—	44,099	0–4
5	April 9	@ Mets	1–0	**Vince Velasquez** (1–0)	Bartolo Colón (0–1)	**Jeanmar Gómez** (1)	37,083	1–4
6	April 10	@ Mets	5–2	**Jeremy Hellickson** (1–0)	Matt Harvey (0–2)	**Jeanmar Gómez** (2)	37,233	2–4
7	April 11	Padres	3–4	Kevin Quackenbush (1–0)	**Aaron Nola** (0–1)	Fernando Rodney (1)	45,229	2–5
8	April 12	Padres	3–0	**Charlie Morton** (1–1)	Robbie Erlin (1–1)	**Jeanmar Gómez** (3)	21,043	3–5
9	April 13	Padres	2–1	**Jerad Eickhoff** (1–1)	Colin Rea (0–1)	**Jeanmar Gómez** (4)	17,638	4–5
10	April 14	Padres	3–0	**Vince Velasquez** (2–0)	Drew Pomeranz (1–1)	—	18,079	5–5
11	April 15	Nationals	1–9	Joe Ross (2–0)	**Jeremy Hellickson** (1–1)	—	22,624	5–6
12	April 16	Nationals	1–8	Max Scherzer (2–0)	**Aaron Nola** (0–2)	—	30,320	5–7
13	April 17	Nationals	3–2 (10)	**Jeanmar Gómez** (1–0)	Jonathan Papelbon (0–1)	—	37,378	6–7
14	April 18	Mets	2–5	Noah Syndergaard (2–0)	**Jerad Eickhoff** (1–2)	—	21,585	6–8
15	April 19	Mets	1–11	Logan Verrett (1–0)	**Vince Velasquez** (2–1)	—	22,417	6–9
16	April 20	Mets	5–4 (11)	**Jeanmar Gómez** (2–0)	Hansel Robles (0–1)	—	20,057	7–9
17	April 22	@ Brewers	5–2	**Aaron Nola** (1–2)	Zach Davies (0–2)	—	23,439	8–9
18	April 23	@ Brewers	10–6	**Brett Oberholtzer** (1–0)	Chase Anderson (1–2)	—	34,813	9–9
19	April 24	@ Brewers	5–8	Wily Peralta (1–3)	**Jerad Eickhoff** (1–3)	Jeremy Jeffress (6)	28,131	9–10
20	April 26	@ Nationals	4–3	**Vince Velasquez** (3–1)	Óliver Pérez (1–1)	**Jeanmar Gómez** (5)	25,097	10–10
21	April 27	@ Nationals	3–0	**Jeremy Hellickson** (2–1)	Gio González (1–1)	**Jeanmar Gómez** (6)	24,186	11–10
22	April 28	@ Nationals	3–0	**Elvis Araújo** (1–0)	Felipe Rivero (0–1)	**Jeanmar Gómez** (7)	22,112	12–10
23	April 29	Indians	4–3 (11)	**David Hernandez** (1–1)	Cody Allen (0–3)	—	18,677	13–10
24	April 30	Indians	4–3	**Andrew Bailey** (1–0)	Tommy Hunter (0–1)	**Jeanmar Gómez** (8)	23,363	14–10

May (12–16)

#	Date	Opponent	Score	Win	Loss	Save	Attendance	Record
25	May 1	Indians	2–1	**Vince Velasquez** (4–1)	Danny Salazar (2–2)	**Héctor Neris** (1)	23,809	15–10
26	May 2	@ Cardinals	3–10	Adam Wainwright (2–3)	**Jeremy Hellickson** (2–2)	—	40,438	15–11
27	May 3	@ Cardinals	1–0	**Aaron Nola** (2–2)	Michael Wacha (2–2)	**Jeanmar Gómez** (9)	40,087	16–11
28	May 4	@ Cardinals	4–5	Kevin Siegrist (4–0)	**Jeanmar Gómez** (2–1)	—	40,725	16–12
29	May 5	@ Cardinals	0–4	Jaime García (2–2)	**Jerad Eickhoff** (1–4)	—	41,818	16–13
30	May 6	@ Marlins	4–6	Kyle Barraclough (2–0)	**Héctor Neris** (0–1)	David Phelps (2)	19,983	16–14
31	May 7	@ Marlins	4–3	**Brett Oberholtzer** (2–0)	Craig Breslow (0–2)	**Jeanmar Gómez** (10)	21,719	17–14
32	May 8	@ Marlins	6–5	**Héctor Neris** (1–1)	David Phelps (2–2)	**Jeanmar Gómez** (11)	19,625	18–14
33	May 10	@ Braves	3–2	**Adam Morgan** (1–0)	Matt Wisler (1–3)	**Jeanmar Gómez** (12)	14,490	19–14
34	May 11	@ Braves	1–5	Williams Pérez (1–0)	**Jerad Eickhoff** (1–5)	—	13,760	19–15
35	May 12	@ Braves	7–4 (10)	**Andrew Bailey** (2–0)	Jason Grilli (1–2)	**Jeanmar Gómez** (13)	15,643	20–15
36	May 13	Reds	3–2	**Jeremy Hellickson** (3–2)	Brandon Finnegan (1–2)	**Jeanmar Gómez** (14)	22,230	21–15
37	May 14	Reds	4–3	**Aaron Nola** (3–2)	Tim Adleman (1–1)	**David Hernandez** (1)	29,535	22–15
38	May 15	Reds	4–9	Dan Straily (2–1)	**Adam Morgan** (1–1)	Tony Cingrani (3)	27,869	22–16
39	May 16	Marlins	3–5	Adam Conley (3–2)	**Jerad Eickhoff** (1–6)	A. J. Ramos (12)	28,348	22–17
40	May 17	Marlins	3–1	**Vince Velasquez** (5–1)	Wei-Yin Chen (3–2)	**Jeanmar Gómez** (15)	18,240	23–17
41	May 18	Marlins	4–2	**Jeremy Hellickson** (4–2)	Tom Koehler (2–4)	**Jeanmar Gómez** (16)	29,579	24–17
42	May 20	Braves	1–7	Matt Wisler (2–3)	**Aaron Nola** (3–3)	—	27,257	24–18
43	May 21	Braves	0–2	Williams Pérez (2–1)	**Adam Morgan** (1–2)	Arodys Vizcaíno (5)	20,196	24–19
44	May 22	Braves	5–0	**Jerad Eickhoff** (2–6)	Casey Kelly (0–1)	—	23,367	25–19
45	May 23	@ Tigers	4–5	Justin Wilson (1–1)	**Colton Murray** (0–1)	Francisco Rodríguez (13)	26,400	25–20
46	May 24	@ Tigers	3–1	Justin Verlander (4–4)	**Jeremy Hellickson** (4–3)	Francisco Rodríguez (14)	26,531	25–21
47	May 25	@ Tigers	8–5	**Aaron Nola** (4–3)	Aníbal Sánchez (3–6)	**Jeanmar Gómez** (17)	31,187	26–21
48	May 27	@ Cubs	2–6	Jon Lester (5–3)	**Adam Morgan** (1–3)	—	38,941	26–22
49	May 28	@ Cubs	1–4	Kyle Hendricks (3–4)	**Jerad Eickhoff** (2–7)	—	41,555	26–23
50	May 29	@ Cubs	2–7	John Lackey (5–2)	**Vince Velasquez** (5–2)	—	41,575	26–24
51	May 30	Nationals	3–4	Tanner Roark (4–4)	**Héctor Neris** (1–2)	Jonathan Papelbon (14)	21,993	26–25
52	May 31	Nationals	1–5	Joe Ross (5–4)	**Aaron Nola** (4–4)	—	18,572	26–26

June (9–19)

#	Date	Opponent	Score	Win	Loss	Save	Attendance	Record
53	June 1	Nationals	2–7	Max Scherzer (6–4)	**Adam Morgan** (1–4)	—	19,052	26–27
54	June 2	Brewers	1–4	Chase Anderson (3–6)	**Jerad Eickhoff** (2–8)	Jeremy Jeffress (14)	22,890	26–28
55	June 3	Brewers	6–3	**Andrew Bailey** (3–0)	Jimmy Nelson (5–4)	**Jeanmar Gómez** (18)	20,138	27–28
56	June 4	Brewers	3–6	Will Smith (1–0)	**Héctor Neris** (1–3)	Jeremy Jeffress (15)	25,177	27–29
57	June 5	Brewers	8–1	**Aaron Nola** (5–4)	Wily Peralta (3–7)	—	24,259	28–29
58	June 6	Cubs	4–6	Jon Lester (7–3)	**Adam Morgan** (1–5)	Héctor Rondón (11)	22,162	28–30
59	June 7	Cubs	3–2	**Jerad Eickhoff** (3–8)	Kyle Hendricks (4–5)	**Jeanmar Gómez** (19)	27,381	29–30
60	June 8	Cubs	1–8	John Lackey (7–2)	**Brett Oberholtzer** (2–1)	—	28,650	29–31
61	June 10	@ Nationals	6–9	Stephen Strasburg (10–0)	**Jeremy Hellickson** (4–4)	Jonathan Papelbon (16)	37,941	29–32
62	June 11	@ Nationals	0–8	Tanner Roark (5–4)	**Aaron Nola** (5–5)	—	38,044	29–33
63	June 12	@ Nationals	4–5	Jonathan Papelbon (1–2)	**Jeanmar Gómez** (2–2)	—	34,294	29–34
64	June 13	@ Blue Jays	7–0	**Jerad Eickhoff** (4–8)	R. A. Dickey (4–7)	—	35,578	30–34
65	June 14	@ Blue Jays	3–11	Marcus Stroman (6–2)	**Zach Eflin** (0–1)	—	47,066	30–35
66	June 15	Blue Jays	3–7	Marco Estrada (5–2)	**Jeremy Hellickson** (4–5)	—	24,753	30–36
67	June 16	Blue Jays	2–13	J. A. Happ (8–3)	**Aaron Nola** (5–6)	—	22,279	30–37
68	June 17	Diamondbacks	2–10	Robbie Ray (4–5)	**Adam Morgan** (1–6)	—	19,282	30–38
69	June 18	Diamondbacks	1–4	Zack Greinke (10–3)	**Jerad Eickhoff** (4–9)	Brad Ziegler (14)	33,797	30–39
70	June 19	Diamondbacks	1–5	Archie Bradley (3–3)	**Zach Eflin** (0–2)	—	40,214	30–40
71	June 20	Diamondbacks	1–3	Shelby Miller (2–6)	**Jeremy Hellickson** (4–6)	Brad Ziegler (15)	22,118	30–41
72	June 21	@ Twins	10–14	Buddy Boshers (2–0)	**Aaron Nola** (5–7)	Brandon Kintzler (3)	25,714	30–42
73	June 22	@ Twins	5–6	Taylor Rogers (3–0)	**David Hernandez** (1–2)	Fernando Abad (1)	25,032	30–43
74	June 23	@ Twins	7–3	**Jerad Eickhoff** (5–9)	Ricky Nolasco (3–5)	—	30,012	31–43
75	June 24	@ Giants	4–5	Jake Peavy (4–6)	**Elvis Araújo** (1–1)	Santiago Casilla (17)	42,238	31–44
76	June 25	@ Giants	3–2	**Jeremy Hellickson** (5–6)	Madison Bumgarner (8–4)	**Jeanmar Gómez** (20)	41,928	32–44
77	June 26	@ Giants	7–8	Cory Gearrin (3–0)	**Severino González** (0–1)	—	41,479	32–45
78	June 27	@ Diamondbacks	8–0	**Vince Velasquez** (6–2)	Robbie Ray (4–7)	—	22,567	33–45
79	June 28	@ Diamondbacks	4–3	**Héctor Neris** (2–3)	Brad Ziegler (2–3)	**Jeanmar Gómez** (21)	19,645	34–45
80	June 29	@ Diamondbacks	9–8 (10)	**Jeanmar Gómez** (3–2)	Silvino Bracho (0–2)	**Brett Oberholtzer** (1)	18,603	35–45

July (13–14)

#	Date	Opponent	Score	Win	Loss	Save	Attendance	Record
81	July 1	Royals	4–3	**Jeremy Hellickson** (6–6)	Ian Kennedy (6–7)	**Jeanmar Gómez** (22)	30,263	36–45
82	July 2	Royals	2–6	Danny Duffy (4–1)	**Aaron Nola** (5–8)	—	40,331	36–46
83	July 3	Royals	7–2	**Vince Velasquez** (7–2)	Yordano Ventura (6–6)	—	20,473	37–46
84	July 4	Braves	8–2	**Jerad Eickhoff** (6–9)	Joel De La Cruz (0–2)	—	19,064	38–46
85	July 5	Braves	5–1	**Zach Eflin** (1–2)	Mike Foltynewicz (2–3)	—	18,426	39–46
86	July 6	Braves	4–3	**Héctor Neris** (3–3)	Arodys Vizcaíno (1–4)	**Jeanmar Gómez** (23)	19,211	40–46
87	July 7	@ Rockies	2–11	Chad Bettis (7–6)	**Adam Morgan** (1–7)	—	35,250	40–47
88	July 8	@ Rockies	5–3	**Vince Velasquez** (8–2)	Jake McGee (0–3)	**Jeanmar Gómez** (24)	42,335	41–47
89	July 9	@ Rockies	3–8	Tyler Anderson (1–3)	**Jerad Eickhoff** (6–10)	Jordan Lyles (1)	48,105	41–48
90	July 10	@ Rockies	10–3	**Zach Eflin** (2–2)	Tyler Chatwood (8–5)	—	32,113	42–48
—	July 12	**2016 Major League Baseball All-Star Game at Petco Park in San Diego**						
91	July 15	Mets	3–5	Bartolo Colón (8–4)	**Jeremy Hellickson** (6–7)	Jeurys Familia (32)	28,076	42–49
92	July 16	Mets	4–2	**Edubray Ramos** (1–0)	Jerry Blevins (3–1)	**Jeanmar Gómez** (25)	37,324	43–49
93	July 17	Mets	0–5	Jacob deGrom (6–4)	**Zach Eflin** (2–3)	—	30,894	43–50
94	July 18	Marlins	2–3 (11)	Kyle Barraclough (6–2)	**Brett Oberholtzer** (2–2)	A. J. Ramos (30)	19,115	43–51
95	July 19	Marlins	1–2 (10)	Mike Dunn (2–1)	**David Hernandez** (1–3)	A. J. Ramos (31)	18,347	43–52
96	July 20	Marlins	4–1	**Jeremy Hellickson** (7–7)	Wei-Yin Chen (5–4)	**Jeanmar Gómez** (26)	20,654	44–52
97	July 21	Marlins	3–9	Tom Koehler (7–8)	**Jerad Eickhoff** (6–11)	—	27,839	44–53
98	July 22	@ Pirates	4–0	**Zach Eflin** (3–3)	Gerrit Cole (5–6)	—	33,703	45–53
99	July 23	@ Pirates	4–7	Juan Nicasio (8–6)	**Aaron Nola** (5–9)	Mark Melancon (29)	35,802	45–54
100	July 24	@ Pirates	4–5	Neftalí Feliz (4–0)	**Edubray Ramos** (1–1)	Mark Melancon (30)	32,439	45–55
101	July 25	@ Marlins	4–0	**David Hernandez** (2–3)	Fernando Rodney (1–3)	—	19,465	46–55
102	July 26	@ Marlins	0–5	Tom Koehler (8–8)	**Jerad Eickhoff** (6–12)	—	20,365	46–56
103	July 27	@ Marlins	1–11	Adam Conley (7–5)	**Zach Eflin** (3–4)	—	32,403	46–57
104	July 28	@ Braves	7–5	**Aaron Nola** (6–9)	Matt Wisler (4–11)	**Jeanmar Gómez** (27)	22,785	47–57
105	July 29	@ Braves	1–2	Tyrell Jenkins (1–2)	**Vince Velasquez** (8–3)	Jim Johnson (5)	27,732	47–58
106	July 30	@ Braves	9–5	**Jeremy Hellickson** (8–7)	Julio Teherán (3–9)	—	38,236	48–58
107	July 31	@ Braves	1–2	Mauricio Cabrera (2–0)	**Andrew Bailey** (3–1)	Jim Johnson (6)	21,545	48–59

August (12–14)

#	Date	Opponent	Score	Win	Loss	Save	Attendance	Record
108	August 2	Giants	13–8	**Héctor Neris** (4–3)	Will Smith (1–4)	—	23,351	49–59
109	August 3	Giants	5–4 (12)	**Luis García** (1–0)	George Kontos (2–2)	—	23,162	50–59
110	August 4	Giants	2–3 (10)	Sergio Romo (1–0)	**Severino González** (0–2)	Santiago Casilla (25)	30,229	50–60
111	August 5	@ Padres	5–4	**Jeremy Hellickson** (9–7)	Christian Friedrich (4–7)	**Jeanmar Gómez** (28)	27,521	51–60
112	August 6	@ Padres	7–9	Buddy Baumann (1–0)	**Jake Thompson** (0–1)	—	37,453	51–61
113	August 7	@ Padres	6–5	**Jerad Eickhoff** (7–12)	Brad Hand (3–3)	**Jeanmar Gómez** (29)	32,710	52–61
114	August 8	@ Dodgers	4–9	Julio Urías (2–2)	**Zach Eflin** (3–5)	—	48,370	52–62
115	August 9	@ Dodgers	3–9	Kenta Maeda (11–7)	**Vince Velasquez** (8–4)	—	42,859	52–63
116	August 10	@ Dodgers	6–2	**Elvis Araújo** (2–1)	Scott Kazmir (9–6)	—	41,098	53–63
117	August 12	Rockies	10–6	**Jake Thompson** (1–1)	Jon Gray (8–6)	—	23,600	54–63
118	August 13	Rockies	6–3	**Jerad Eickhoff** (8–12)	Tyler Anderson (4–4)	**Jeanmar Gómez** (30)	23,203	55–63
119	August 14	Rockies	7–6	**Severino González** (1–2)	Tyler Chatwood (10–8)	**Jeanmar Gómez** (31)	20,068	56–63
120	August 16	Dodgers	5–15	Kenta Maeda (12–7)	**Vince Velasquez** (8–5)	—	28,118	56–64
121	August 17	Dodgers	2–7	Scott Kazmir (10–6)	**Jake Thompson** (1–2)	—	21,137	56–65
122	August 18	Dodgers	5–4	**Michael Mariot** (1–0)	Grant Dayton (0–1)	**Jeanmar Gómez** (32)	29,187	57–65
123	August 19	Cardinals	3–4 (11)	Seung-hwan Oh (3–2)	**Frank Herrmann** (0–1)	Alex Reyes (1)	20,627	57–66
124	August 20	Cardinals	4–2	**Jeremy Hellickson** (10–7)	Luke Weaver (0–1)	**Jeanmar Gómez** (33)	32,338	58–66
125	August 21	Cardinals	0–9	Mike Leake (9–9)	**Vince Velasquez** (8–6)	—	20,127	58–67
126	August 23	@ White Sox	1–9	Carlos Rodon (4–8)	**Jake Thompson** (1–3)	—	18,843	58–68
127	August 24	@ White Sox	5–3	**Jerad Eickhoff** (9–12)	James Shields (5–16)	**Jeanmar Gómez** (34)	15,630	59–68
128	August 26	@ Mets	4–9	Bartolo Colón (12–7)	**Adam Morgan** (1–8)	—	31,111	59–69
129	August 27	@ Mets	1–12	Noah Syndergaard (12–7)	**Jeremy Hellickson** (10–8)	—	35,832	59–70
130	August 28	@ Mets	5–1	**David Hernandez** (3–3)	Robert Gsellman (1–1)	—	32,033	60–70
131	August 29	Nationals	0–4	Tanner Roark (14–7)	**Jake Thompson** (1–4)	—	16,056	60–71
132	August 30	Nationals	2–3	Max Scherzer (15–7)	**Jerad Eickhoff** (9–13)	Mark Melancon (37)	16,378	60–72
133	August 31	Nationals	1–2	Gio González (10–9)	**Adam Morgan** (1–9)	Shawn Kelley (7)	16,503	60–73

September (10–17)

#	Date	Opponent	Score	Win	Loss	Save	Attendance	Record
134	September 2	Braves	4–8	Mauricio Cabrera (3–0)	**Jeanmar Gómez** (3–3)	—	17,175	60–74
135	September 3	Braves	4–6 (10)	Jed Bradley (1–0)	**Edubray Ramos** (1–2)	Mauricio Cabrera (4)	19,453	60–75
136	September 4	Braves	0–2	Julio Teherán (5–9)	**Jake Thompson** (1–5)	Jim Johnson (15)	21,322	60–76
137	September 5	@ Marlins	6–2	**Jerad Eickhoff** (10–13)	Jake Esch (0–1)	—	20,849	61–76
138	September 6	@ Marlins	4–3	**Adam Morgan** (2–9)	José Ureña (3–6)	**Jeanmar Gómez** (35)	16,169	62–76
139	September 7	@ Marlins	0–6	Andrew Cashner (5–11)	**Jeremy Hellickson** (10–9)	—	16,592	62–77
140	September 8	@ Nationals	4–1	**Alec Asher** (1–0)	A. J. Cole (1–2)	**Jeanmar Gómez** (36)	25,412	63–77
141	September 9	@ Nationals	4–5	Mark Melancon (2–1)	**Frank Herrmann** (0–2)	—	28,469	63–78
142	September 10	@ Nationals	0–3	Shawn Kelley (2–2)	**Luis García** (1–1)	Mark Melancon (40)	36,152	63–79
143	September 11	@ Nationals	2–3	Gio González (11–9)	**Adam Morgan** (2–10)	Mark Melancon (41)	31,805	63–80
144	September 12	Pirates	6–2	**Jeremy Hellickson** (11–9)	Gerrit Cole (7–10)	—	15,514	64–80
145	September 13	Pirates	3–5	Rivero (1–4)	**Jeanmar Gómez** (3–4)	Tony Watson (12)	16,190	64–81
146	September 14	Pirates	6–2	**Jake Thompson** (2–5)	Steven Brault (0–3)	**Jeanmar Gómez** (37)	16,112	65–81
147	September 15	Pirates	2–15	Chad Kuhl (4–3)	**Jerad Eickhoff** (10–14)	—	15,247	65–82
148	September 16	Marlins	4–3 (13)	**Frank Herrmann** (1–2)	A. J. Ramos (1–3)	—	18,179	66–82
149	September 17	Marlins	8–0	**Jeremy Hellickson** (12–9)	José Ureña (4–7)	—	24,597	67–82
150	September 18	Marlins	4–5	Mike Dunn (4–1)	**Héctor Neris** (4–4)	A. J. Ramos (37)	20,059	67–83
151	September 20	White Sox	7–6	**Jake Thompson** (3–5)	James Shields (5–18)	**Michael Mariot** (1)	16,096	68–83
152	September 21	White Sox	8–3	**Jerad Eickhoff** (11–14)	Chris Sale (16–9)	—	21,703	69–83
153	September 22	@ Mets	8–9 (11)	Jim Henderson (2–2)	**Edubray Ramos** (1–3)	—	35,759	69–84
154	September 23	@ Mets	5–10	Josh Smoker (3–0)	**Jeremy Hellickson** (12–10)	Hansel Robles (1)	37,873	69–85
155	September 24	@ Mets	10–8	**Alec Asher** (2–0)	Sean Gilmartin (0–1)	**Michael Mariot** (2)	39,995	70–85
156	September 25	@ Mets	0–17	Robert Gsellman (3–2)	**Jake Thompson** (3–6)	—	35,093	70–86
157	September 27	@ Braves	6–7	Mauricio Cabrera (4–1)	**David Hernandez** (3–4)	Jim Johnson (18)	22,348	70–87
158	September 28	@ Braves	2–12	Mike Foltynewicz (9–5)	**Adam Morgan** (2–11)	—	22,104	70–88
159	September 29	@ Braves	2–5	Mauricio Cabrera (5–1)	**Jeanmar Gómez** (3–5)	—	32,121	70–89
160	September 30	Mets	1–5	Robert Gsellman (4–2)	**Alec Asher** (2–1)	—	20,556	70–90

October (1–1)

#	Date	Opponent	Score	Win	Loss	Save	Attendance	Record
161	October 1	Mets	3–5	Bartolo Colón (15–8)	**Patrick Schuster** (0–1)	Jeurys Familia (51)	20,225	70–91
162	October 2	Mets	5–2	**Colton Murray** (1–1)	Erik Goeddel (2–2)	**Héctor Neris** (2)	36,935	71–91

== Roster ==
All players who made an appearance for the Phillies during 2016 are included.

2016 Philadelphia Phillies
Roster
Pitchers: 59 Elvis Araújo; 49 Alec Asher; 38 Andrew Bailey; 56 Zach Eflin; 48 Jerad Eickhoff; 57 Luis García; 46 Jeanmar Gómez; 52 Severino González; 58 Jeremy Hellickson; 30 David Hernandez; 53 Frank Herrmann; 94 Dalier Hinojosa; 43 Phil Klein; 31 Michael Mariot; 39 Adam Morgan; 47 Charlie Morton; 60 Colton Murray; 50 Héctor Neris; 27 Aaron Nola; 34 Brett Oberholtzer; 61 Edubray Ramos; 63 Joely Rodríguez; 40 James Russell; 62 Patrick Schuster; 53 Daniel Stumpf; 44 Jake Thompson; 28 Vince Velasquez	Catchers: 38 Jorge Alfaro; 34 A. J. Ellis; 51 Carlos Ruiz; 29 Cameron Rupp; Infielders: 4 Andrés Blanco; 15 Emmanuel Burriss; 21 Taylor Featherston; 7 Maikel Franco; 13 Freddy Galvis; 16 César Hernández; 6 Ryan Howard; 19 Tommy Joseph; 18 Darin Ruf	Outfielders: 23 Aaron Altherr; 25 Cody Asche; 17 Peter Bourjos; 2 Tyler Goeddel; 37 Odubel Herrera; 21 Cedric Hunter; 3 David Lough; 41 Jimmy Paredes; 24 Roman Quinn	Manager: 45 Pete Mackanin; Coaches: 10 Larry Bowa (bench); 5 Steve Henderson (hitting); 33 Rick Kranitz (bullpen); 82 Jose Mayorga (bullpen catcher); 22 Bob McClure (pitching); 9 John McLaren (catching); 12 Mickey Morandini (first base); 8 Juan Samuel (third base); 81 Jesús Tiamo (bullpen catcher)

== Player stats ==
=== Batting ===
Note: G = Games played; AB = At bats; R = Runs; H = Hits; 2B = Doubles; 3B = Triples; HR = Home runs; RBI = Runs batted in; SB = Stolen bases; BB = Walks; AVG = Batting average; SLG = Slugging average

Player	G	AB	R	H	2B	3B	HR	RBI	SB	BB	AVG	SLG
Freddy Galvis	158	584	61	141	26	3	20	67	17	25	.241	.399
Odúbel Herrera	159	583	87	167	21	6	15	49	25	63	.286	.420
Maikel Franco	152	581	67	148	23	1	25	88	1	40	.255	.427
César Hernández	155	547	67	161	14	11	6	39	17	66	.294	.393
Cameron Rupp	105	389	36	98	26	1	16	54	1	24	.252	.447
Peter Bourjos	123	355	40	89	20	7	5	23	6	17	.251	.389
Ryan Howard	112	331	35	65	10	0	25	59	0	27	.196	.453
Tommy Joseph	107	315	47	81	15	0	21	47	1	22	.257	.505
Tyler Goeddel	92	213	17	41	3	3	4	16	3	17	.192	.291
Aaron Altherr	57	198	23	39	6	0	4	22	7	23	.197	.288
Cody Asche	71	197	22	42	15	0	4	18	3	18	.213	.350
Andrés Blanco	90	190	26	48	15	1	4	21	2	11	.253	.405
Jimmy Paredes	76	143	13	31	7	0	4	17	0	5	.217	.350
Darin Ruf	43	83	8	17	2	0	3	9	0	4	.205	.337
David Lough	30	67	6	16	3	1	0	4	1	9	.239	.313
Roman Quinn	15	57	10	15	4	0	0	6	5	8	.263	.333
Emmanuel Burriss	39	45	3	5	1	1	0	0	1	2	.111	.178
Cedric Hunter	13	34	3	3	0	0	1	1	0	2	.088	.176
A.J. Ellis	11	32	3	10	3	0	1	9	1	3	.313	.500
Taylor Featherston	19	26	2	3	1	0	0	1	2	2	.115	.154
Jorge Alfaro	6	16	0	2	0	0	0	0	0	1	.125	.125
Pitcher totals	162	283	16	40	10	0	0	12	0	11	.141	.177
Team totals	162	5434	610	1305	231	35	161	574	96	424	.240	.384

=== Pitching ===
Note: W = Wins; L = Losses; ERA = Earned run average; G = Games pitched; GS = Games started; SV = Saves; IP = Innings pitched; H = Hits allowed; R = Runs allowed; ER = Earned runs allowed; BB = Walks allowed; SO = Strikeouts

Player	W	L	ERA	G	GS	SV	IP	H	R	ER	BB	SO
Jerad Eickhoff	11	14	3.65	33	33	0	197.1	187	88	80	42	167
Jeremy Hellickson	12	10	3.71	32	32	0	189.0	173	86	78	45	154
Vince Velasquez	8	6	4.12	24	24	0	131.0	129	64	60	45	152
Adam Morgan	2	11	6.04	23	21	0	113.1	141	81	76	29	95
Aaron Nola	6	9	4.78	20	20	0	111.0	116	68	59	29	121
Hector Neris	4	4	2.58	79	0	2	80.1	59	26	23	30	102
David Hernandez	3	4	3.84	70	0	1	72.2	77	31	31	32	80
Jeanmar Gómez	3	5	4.85	70	0	37	68.2	78	38	37	22	47
Zach Eflin	3	5	5.54	11	11	0	63.1	67	42	39	17	31
Jake Thompson	3	6	5.70	10	10	0	53.2	53	34	34	28	32
Brett Oberholtzer	2	2	4.83	26	0	1	50.1	58	28	27	20	38
Edubray Ramos	1	3	3.83	42	0	0	40.0	36	18	17	11	40
Severino González	1	2	5.60	27	0	0	35.1	40	22	22	7	34
Andrew Bailey	3	1	6.40	33	0	0	32.1	32	23	23	15	33
Colton Murray	1	1	6.25	24	0	0	31.2	34	22	22	13	31
Alec Asher	2	1	2.28	5	5	0	27.2	22	11	7	4	13
Elvis Araujo	2	1	5.60	32	0	0	27.1	35	22	17	17	29
Michael Mariot	1	0	5.82	25	0	2	21.2	18	14	14	14	23
Charlie Morton	1	1	4.15	4	4	0	17.1	15	8	8	8	19
Luis García	1	1	6.46	17	0	0	15.1	21	11	11	8	14
Frank Herrmann	1	2	8.40	14	0	0	15.0	20	16	14	5	14
Dalier Hinojosa	0	1	3.27	10	0	0	11.0	10	4	4	3	8
Phil Klein	0	0	8.44	4	2	0	10.2	15	10	10	7	7
Joely Rodríguez	0	0	2.79	12	0	0	9.2	8	3	3	4	7
Daniel Stumpf	0	0	10.80	7	0	0	5.0	9	6	6	2	2
James Russell	0	0	18.69	7	0	0	4.1	9	9	9	5	4
Patrick Schuster	0	1	45.00	6	0	0	2.0	6	11	10	4	2
Team totals	71	91	4.63	162	162	43	1437.0	1468	796	739	466	1299

== Farm system ==
Level	Team	League	Manager
AAA	Lehigh Valley IronPigs	International League	Dave Brundage
AA	Reading Fightin Phils	Eastern League	Dusty Wathan
A-Advanced	Clearwater Threshers	Florida State League	Greg Legg
A	Lakewood BlueClaws	South Atlantic League	Shawn Williams
A-Short Season	Williamsport Crosscutters	New York–Penn League	Pat Borders
Rookie	GCL Phillies	Gulf Coast League	Roly de Armas
Rookie	DSL Phillies	Dominican Summer League	
Rookie	DSL Phillies 2	Dominican Summer League	
