= Freddy Galvis =

Venezuelan baseball player (born 1989)

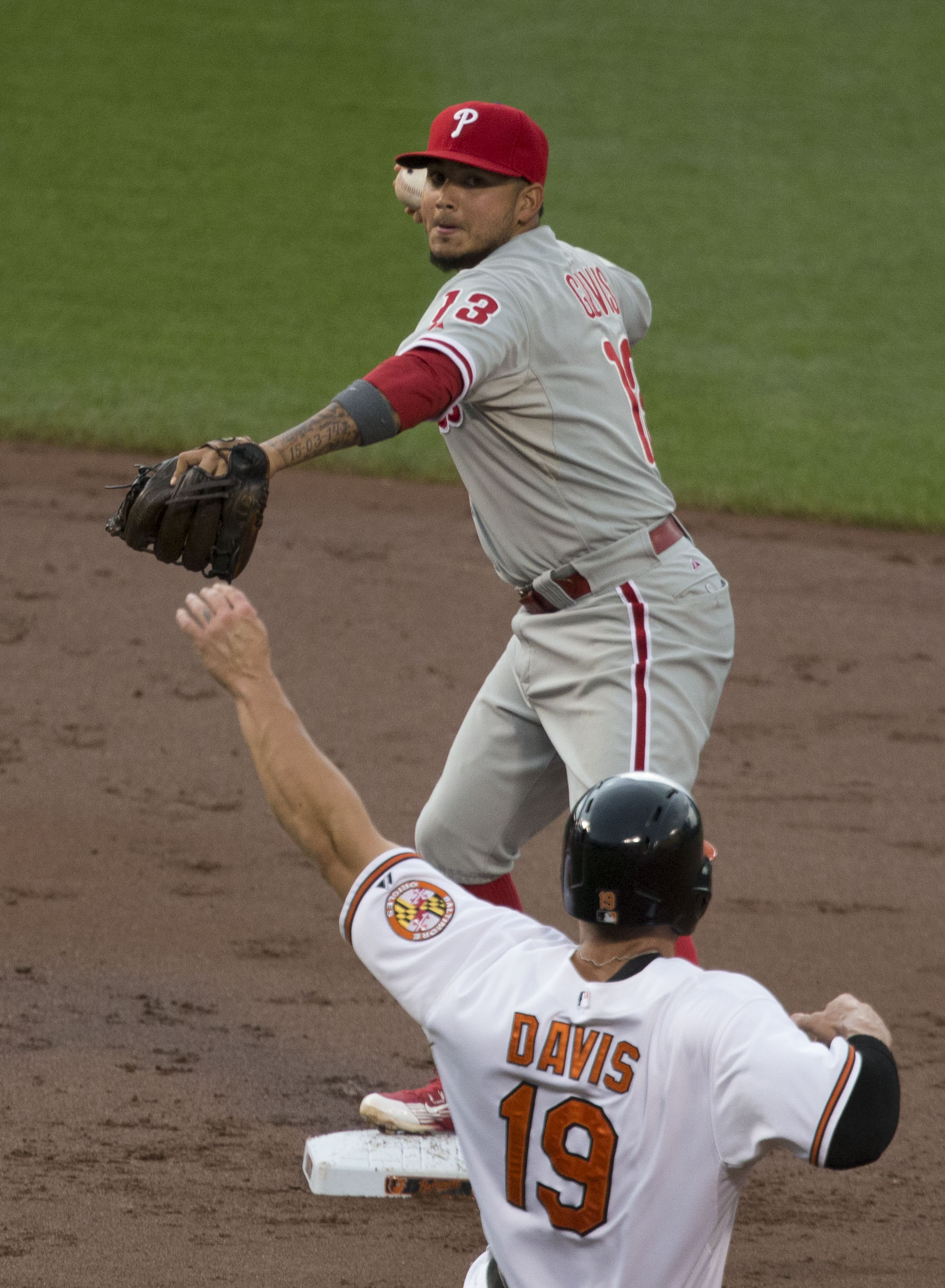
- Galvis with the Philadelphia Phillies in 2015
- Shortstop
- Born: November 14, 1989 (age 37); Punto Fijo, Falcón, Venezuela
- Batted: Switch Threw: Right

Professional debut
- MLB: April 5, 2012, for the Philadelphia Phillies
- NPB: March 25, 2022, for the Fukuoka SoftBank Hawks

Last appearance
- MLB: October 3, 2021, for the Philadelphia Phillies
- NPB: May 30, 2023, for the Fukuoka SoftBank Hawks

MLB statistics
- Batting average: .246
- Home runs: 109
- Runs batted in: 426

NPB statistics
- Batting average: .167
- Home runs: 2
- Runs batted in: 12
- Stats at Baseball Reference

Teams
- Philadelphia Phillies (2012–2017); San Diego Padres (2018); Toronto Blue Jays (2019); Cincinnati Reds (2019–2020); Baltimore Orioles (2021); Philadelphia Phillies (2021); Fukuoka SoftBank Hawks (2022–2023)

Freddy José Galvis (born November 14, 1989) is a Venezuelan former professional baseball shortstop. He played in Major League Baseball (MLB) for the San Diego Padres, Toronto Blue Jays, Cincinnati Reds, Baltimore Orioles, and Philadelphia Phillies, and in Nippon Professional Baseball (NPB) for the Fukuoka SoftBank Hawks.

Galvis was born in Punto Fijo, Falcón, Venezuela, and played Little League Baseball including the Little League World Series there before being discovered by one of the Phillies' scouts. At age 16, he signed a contract with the Phillies despite not receiving much attention from scouts. He spent the next several years in their minor league system, including a particularly lengthy stint with the Phillies' Double-A (AA) affiliate the Reading Phillies. He made his major league debut on Opening Day of 2012 at second base, substituting for the injured Chase Utley. He became a fan favorite for his performance early in the season, especially defensively, until he sustained an injury and subsequently was suspended for 50 games after a positive test for performance-enhancing drugs. He missed the remainder of the season. Over the course of the next two seasons, he split time between the Lehigh Valley IronPigs – the Phillies' Triple-A affiliate – and the major league ball club, but struggled to establish himself offensively.

Beginning in 2015, Galvis spent three seasons as the Phillies' starting shortstop. In 2016, 2017, and 2018, he led National League shortstops in fielding percentage, and was twice nominated for a Gold Glove Award. In December 2017 he was traded to the San Diego Padres, becoming their starting shortstop in 2018. He spent the first five months of the 2019 season with the Toronto Blue Jays before being claimed off waivers by the Cincinnati Reds in August.

== Early life ==
Galvis was born November 14, 1989, in Punto Fijo, Falcón, Venezuela, and at age 14, the Philadelphia Phillies began to scout him during his days playing youth baseball. He participated on Latin America's team in the Little League World Series, but due to his slight stature (5 feet 10 inches (1.78 m) 154 pounds (70 kg)), struggled to captivate scouts' attention. Galvis said, "They told me that I couldn't play (pro) baseball. But I knew I had the ability." In 2006, scouts Sal Agostinelli and Jesus Mendez signed him during the amateur player signing period. Galvis, 16 years old, was not a particularly heralded prospect, but did receive some attention from scouting experts before signing with the Phillies.

== Professional career ==
=== Philadelphia Phillies ===
==== Minor leagues ====
Galvis participated in the Florida Instructional League in 2006. The next season, he officially began affiliated baseball in 2007 with the Low-A Williamsport Crosscutters at age 17, as one of just five players not born in the United States. He made an impression with Phillies' personnel due to outstanding defensive skills that drew comparisons to those of Baseball Hall of Famer Omar Vizquel, and also demonstrated solid instincts while baserunning, despite struggling to get on base. Concurrently, he hit .203 with nine stolen bases in 38 games. In 2008, with the Single-A Lakewood BlueClaws in the South Atlantic League, Galvis hit .238 with 14 stolen bases in 127 games. He had a particularly strong May, during which he hit .313 with 14 RBI. Galvis also earned placement on the league's postseason all-star team. He began 2009 with the Clearwater Threshers in High-A, and was the Phillies minor league player of the week after he hit .417 from April 20 to 26. The following May, Galvis fractured his right ring finger, and spent more than two months on the disabled list. Thereafter, he spent seven games with the rookie-level Gulf Coast League Phillies before finishing the season at Double-A, where he hit just .197.

Galvis returned to Reading for his 2010 season after earning an invitation to the Phillies' major league spring training. He led all shortstops in the Eastern League in fielding percentage, assists, putouts, and total chances. Galvis was named an Eastern League All-Star. After the season, he played for Navegantes del Magallanes in the Venezuelan Winter League. Entering 2011, Galvis was "considered major-league-ready defensively but a major liability offensively." But in 2011, at age 21, Galvis had the best season of his career to date. Always known as an excellent defender, but mediocre hitter, he was finally able to improve at the plate, thanks in part to a much more rigorous off-season conditioning regimen, and also due to hitting higher in the batting order, where he was thus challenged to make greater offensive contributions by utilizing a more aggressive approach. He also improved his arm strength to the point that at least defensively, coaches and front office personnel felt he was ready to be a major league shortstop. Starting the year in Double-A with the Reading Phillies, Galvis hit .273, with 35 RBIs, in 464 plate appearances across 104 games. In August, Galvis was promoted to the Triple-A Lehigh Valley IronPigs, with whom he hit .321 with nine multi-hit games and 13 runs scored in his first 23 games. He hit in the leadoff spot with Lehigh Valley as well. Overall with Lehigh Valley, Galvis hit .298, with eight RBI in 126 plate appearances during 33 games. Between Double-A and Triple-A, he combined to hit .278 with eight home runs, 43 RBI, 78 runs, and 23 stolen bases in 137 games. His excellent numbers were enough to earn the 2011 Paul Owens Award, which is given to the best position player and pitcher, respectively, in the Philadelphia Phillies minor league system. At the end of the 2011 season, Galvis was sent to the Venezuelan Winter League, and despite a brief ganglion cyst injury, played there until December 1.

==== Major leagues ====
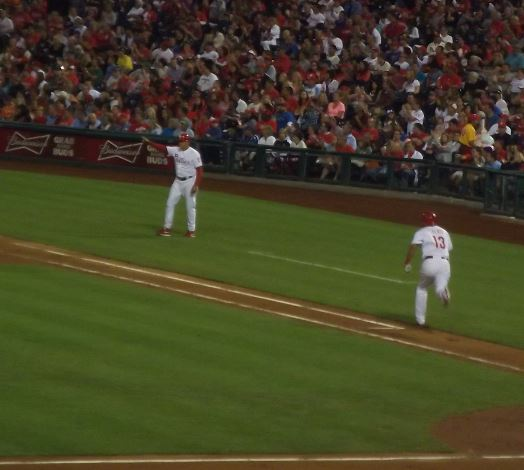
Freddy Galvis runs to first base and Wally Joyner waves him to go to second base in a Phillies game on September 7, 2013

Galvis was disappointed to learn that Phillies' shortstop Jimmy Rollins had re-signed with the Phillies during offseason preceding 2012, as Galvis had hoped to replace him. He said that he allowed himself to pout for two hours, and then moved on. With Rollins re-signing with the Phillies, Galvis thought he was headed back to the minor leagues. He entered spring training as "one of the most intriguing story lines" for the Phillies, and led the team in several statistical categories, but still presumed to open the season in Triple-A. However, on March 19, 2012, Phillies general manager Rubén Amaro, Jr. announced that Chase Utley would miss the beginning of the season due to a knee injury, and Galvis would be the opening day starter there.

Galvis became the first Phillies' player to make his major league debut on opening day in 42 years when he did so on April 5. In his debut, he hit into two double plays. Galvis recorded his first major league hit in his fourth career game on April 9, a two-run double off of Miami Marlins pitcher Aníbal Sánchez. Four days later, he hit his first major league home run off of R. A. Dickey in a game against the New York Mets. After spending two months as the Phillies' starting second baseman, Galvis injured his back on June 8; the injury was initially thought to be a lower back strain, but eventually diagnosed as a Pars fracture in his back. He was placed on the disabled list shortly thereafter. By that time, he had "won the hearts of fans and earned the confidence of his manager ... with dazzling defense."

While on the disabled list, Galvis tested positive for having a metabolite of Clostebol (a performance-enhancing synthetic steroid) in his system, a violation of Major League Baseball's Joint Drug Prevention and Treatment Program. Galvis denied any wrongdoing, commenting, "I cannot understand how even this tiny particle of a banned substance got into my body. I have not and never would knowingly use anything illegal to enhance my performance." He was suspended 50 games by Major League Baseball for testing positive for a banned substance. Phillies general manager Ruben Amaro, Jr. said "It's disappointing. We fully support the program and the decision. At the same time, we support the player." He did not play for the remainder of the Phillies' 2012 season.

There was considerable debate as to whether Galvis should open the 2013 season working on his hitting in Triple-A, or on the bench of the major league Phillies. Manager Charlie Manuel preferred the latter, commenting that even in 300 major league at bats splitting time between second base, shortstop, and third base, Galvis could make a greater contribution than in a season in the minor leagues. Ultimately, he did make the opening day roster, but struggled through the first third of the season, and was optioned to Triple-A on June 27. Correspondingly, the Phillies acquired veteran infielder John McDonald. He performed better in Triple-A, including a 40-game streak during which he did not commit any errors, and a leadoff home run on the Fourth of July. He returned to the major league Phillies as a September callup, and on September 7, 2013, he compiled four hits including a game-winning home run against the Atlanta Braves. Overall, 19 at second base, 14 at third base, 10 in left field, and six at shortstop comprised his 49 total major league starts. At the major league level, he hit .234 with six home runs and 19 RBI, and in Triple-A, he hit .245 with three home runs and 25 RBI.

Galvis opened the 2014 season with a health scare. During spring training, Galvis contracted a methicillin-resistant Staphylococcus aureus infection (more commonly known as MRSA), ostensibly from the Phillies' clubhouse at Bright House Field in Clearwater, Florida. "The team's most versatile and best defensive player", Galvis returned to the major league club on April 11. After he struggled early in the season, the Phillies optioned him to Triple-A on May 9 in favor of Reid Brignac. Two days later, he broke his clavicle, and spent two months on the disabled list. After a rehabilitation assignment, he performed well at Triple-A, and earned a call-up to the major leagues, replacing Brignac, whom the Phillies designated for assignment. Overall, Galvis posted his worst offensive season thus far; he hit .176 at the major league level with four home runs and 12 RBIs. After the season, Michael Baumann of Crashburn Alley wrote, "After two years of medical and developmental setbacks, Galvis is still only entering his age-25 season, so it's possible the bat develops from bad to below-average and Galvis turns into something. I wouldn’t count on it, but it's still within the realm of possibility."

When the Phillies traded Rollins to the Los Angeles Dodgers prior to the 2015 season, media reports speculated that Galvis and César Hernández were the presumptive nominees to start at shortstop for the upcoming season, likely seeking to bridge the gap between Rollins and J. P. Crawford, the top prospect in the Phillies' organization. Galvis indeed became the team's starting shortstop, where he would remain for the following three seasons. He finished the 2015 season with a .263 batting average in 151 total games played.

Galvis had a mixed year in the 2016 season both defensively and offensively. He led all National League shortstops in fielding percentage (.987) and was nominated for a Gold Glove Award, ultimately losing to Brandon Crawford of the San Francisco Giants. Offensively, Galvis collected 20 home runs and 67 RBIs with a .241 batting average in 158 games played. On the other hand, his .274 on base percentage was the lowest of all qualified major league batters.

Galvis played all 162 games in the 2017 season, including 155 games started at shortstop. On Opening Day, he hit a home run in the second inning against the Cincinnati Reds, one of 12 he would hit that season. Despite playing every game with the Phillies, Galvis slowly began to lose playing time at shortstop to top Phillies prospect J. P. Crawford following Crawford's September callup. Galvis finished with a .255 batting average and .690 OPS. He also performed well defensively, again leading National League shortstops in fielding percentage and being nominated for a Gold Glove Award, and again losing to the San Francisco Giants' Brandon Crawford.

=== San Diego Padres ===
On December 15, 2017, Galvis was traded to the San Diego Padres in exchange for pitcher Enyel De Los Santos. He opened the 2018 season as the Padres' starting shortstop, and again played in all 162 games. This included 157 starts at shortshop and five starts at second base, in a season in which Galvis batted .248 with 13 home runs and a .680 OPS. He also recorded the highest shortstop fielding percentage for the third consecutive season. At the end of the season, Galvis became a free agent.

=== Toronto Blue Jays ===
On January 29, 2019, Galvis signed a one-year, $4 million contract with the Toronto Blue Jays. The contract included a club option for the 2020 season. In 115 appearances for Toronto, Galvis slashed .267/.299/.444 with 18 home runs and 54 RBI.

=== Cincinnati Reds ===
On August 12, 2019, Galvis was claimed off waivers by the Cincinnati Reds. In 47 games in 2020 with Cincinnati, Galvis hit .220/.308/.404 with 31 hits and 7 home runs over 141 at-bats.

=== Baltimore Orioles ===
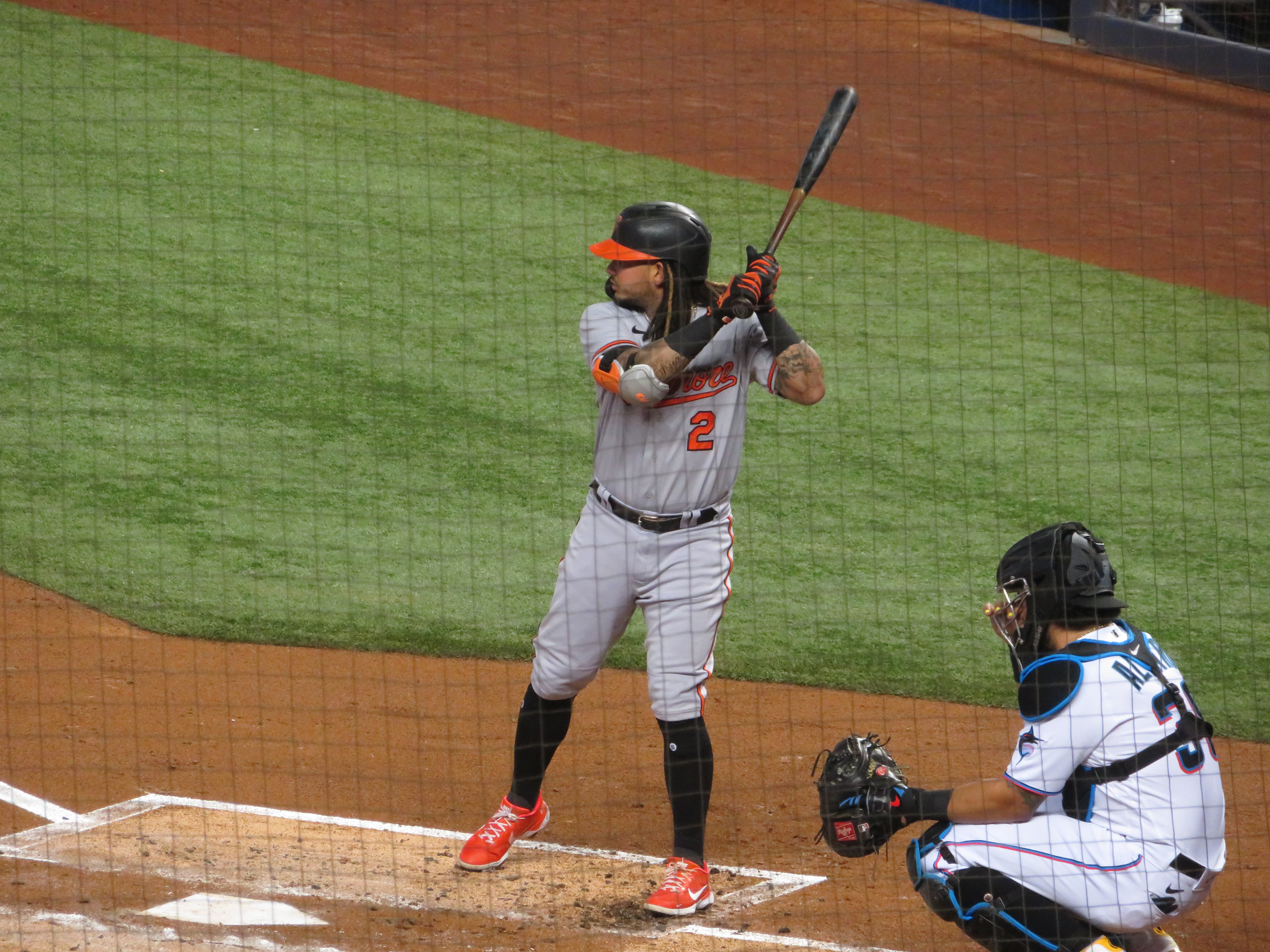
Galvis with the Orioles in 2021.

On January 26, 2021, Galvis signed a one-year, $1.5 million contract with the Baltimore Orioles. In 72 appearances for the Orioles, Galvis batted .249/.306/.414 with nine home runs and 26 RBI.

=== Philadelphia Phillies (second stint) ===
On July 30, 2021, Galvis was traded to the Philadelphia Phillies in exchange for minor league pitcher Tyler Burch. In 32 games down the stretch for the Phillies, he hit .224/.292/.393 with five home runs and 14 RBI.

=== Fukuoka SoftBank Hawks ===
On December 13, 2021, Galvis signed with the Fukuoka SoftBank Hawks of Nippon Professional Baseball on a two-year deal for an undisclosed salary.

Galvis made his NPB debut in the opening game against the Hokkaido Nippon-Ham Fighters on March 25, 2022, and went 2-for-2 with a grand slam. However, his batting average slumped to .129 in 27 games, and on May 2 he was removed from the first team registration. He was re-registered on June 7, but was again removed from the roster after only four games. On August 20, 2022, Galvis was re-registered and recorded his second grand slam against the Tohoku Rakuten Golden Eagles. He finished the regular season with a .171 batting average, two home runs, and 11 RBI in only 38 games due to his batting slumps and competition with fellow infielders Kenta Imamiya, who posted a career best .296 batting average in 2022, and rookie Masaki Mimori, who posted a .257 batting average, 9 home runs, and 36 RBI despite missing 41 games due to a broken thumb and being diagnosed with COVID-19.

On November 27, 2022, Galvis decided to change his uniform number from 3 to 0 beginning with the 2023 season. In 19 games for the Hawks, he batted .152/.177/.152 with no home runs and one RBI. On December 4, SoftBank announced that Galvis would not return to the team, making him a free agent.

=== Tecolotes de los Dos Laredos ===
On March 11, 2024, Galvis signed with the Tecolotes de los Dos Laredos of the Mexican League. In 69 appearances for Dos Laredos, he batted .269/.345/.430 with six home runs and 43 RBI. Galvis was released by the Tecolotes on March 11, 2025.

On July 4, 2025, Galvis announced his retirement from professional baseball via social media.

== Player profile ==
Galvis is a slap hitter who, throughout his major league career, has struggled to assert himself as a competent offensive player. Generally, he seeks to drive the ball in the center of the field, and has shortened his stroke. He has very little ability as a power hitter, but he has hit several home runs in key situations throughout his career, an anomaly that confounded Baumann, who noted that Galvis's inability "to force his way into the lineup by this point has probably scuttled any chance Galvis has of being the Phillies’ starting shortstop of the future." Despite his offensive struggles, Phillies staff and media have long recognized Galvis's strong defensive skills, noting his propensity to make acrobatic and athletic plays, as well as utilize a strong throwing arm. He aspires to emulate Omar Vizquel, his role model. Sam Donellon, a columnist for The Philadelphia Inquirer, noted that "there are similarities between Galvis and his idol. Both were signed at 16, both are switch-hitters, both struggled to hit pitching at any level in their early minor league seasons." Cognizant that he is a smaller player, Galvis has spent significant time working to improve his physical strength and conditioning in the offseasons.

== Personal life ==
Galvis struggled off the field after his injury in 2012, noting that he only emerged from the covers of his bed to answer the door for takeout food, mainly Chinese food, pizza, and cheesesteaks. Since then, he has started a daily therapeutic routine aimed at preventing future injuries, to which he is apparently susceptible after his first back injury. His hobbies include relaxing at the beach and playing basketball. Galvis married his wife, Anna, in 2013, and is the father of two girls named Anastasia and Nicole.

== See also ==
- List of Major League Baseball players from Venezuela
