= Michael Mariot =

American baseball player (born 1988)

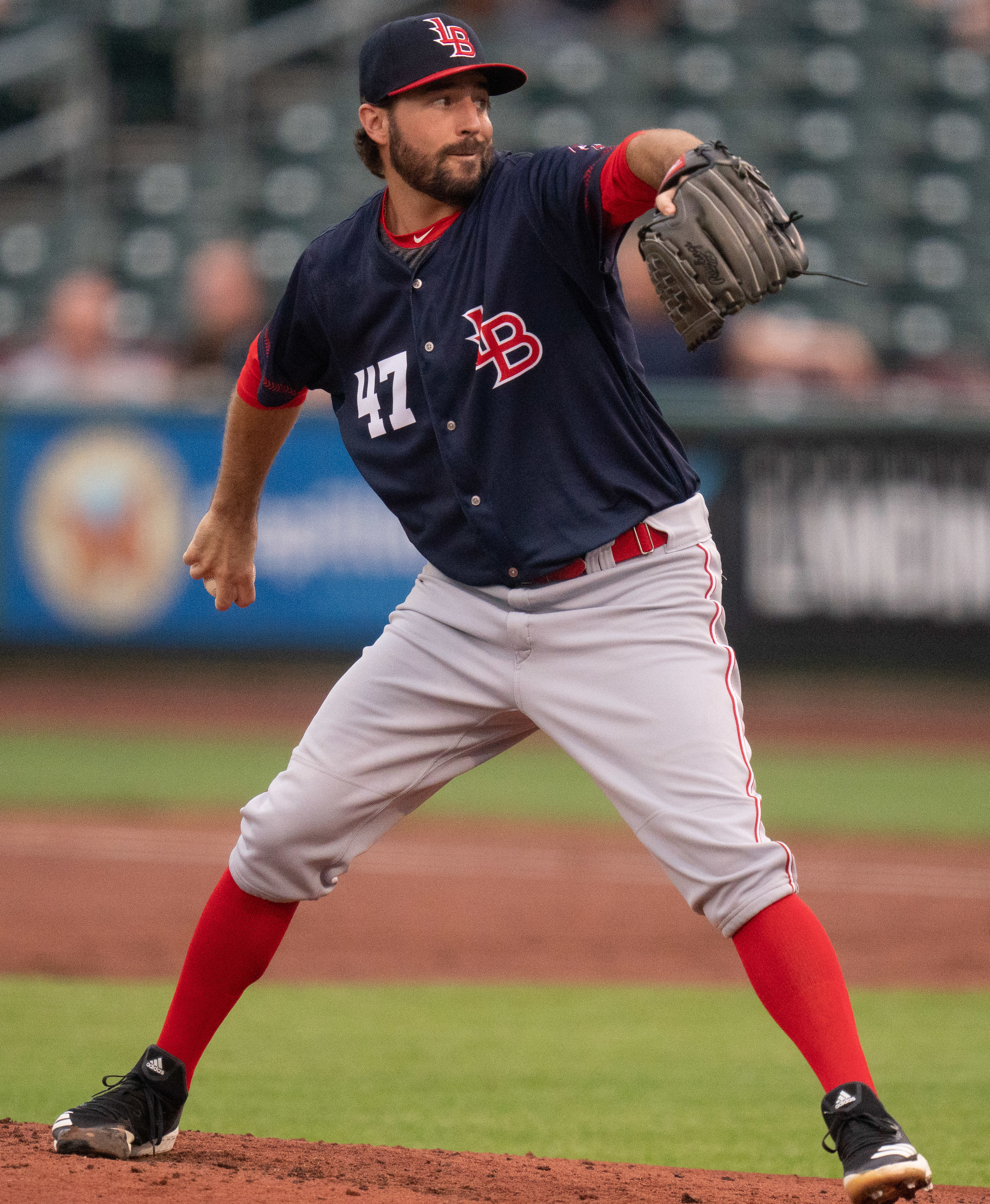
- Mariot with the Louisville Bats in 2021

Kansas City Monarchs – No. 19
- Pitcher
- Born: October 20, 1988 (age 37); West Hills, California, U.S.
- Bats: Right Throws: Right

Professional debut
- MLB: April 11, 2014, for the Kansas City Royals
- CPBL: August 21, 2022, for the CTBC Brothers

MLB statistics (through 2023 season)
- Win–loss record: 2–0
- Earned run average: 5.85
- Strikeouts: 47

CPBL statistics (through 2022 season)
- Win–loss record: 1–3
- Earned run average: 2.95
- Strikeouts: 11
- Stats at Baseball Reference

Teams
- Kansas City Royals (2014–2015); Philadelphia Phillies (2016); CTBC Brothers (2022); Cincinnati Reds (2023)

Michael Ryan Mariot (born October 20, 1988) is an American professional baseball pitcher for the Kansas City Monarchs of the American Association of Professional Baseball. He has previously played in Major League Baseball (MLB) for the Kansas City Royals, Philadelphia Phillies, and Cincinnati Reds, and in the Chinese Professional Baseball League (CPBL) for the CTBC Brothers.

== Career ==
=== Kansas City Royals ===
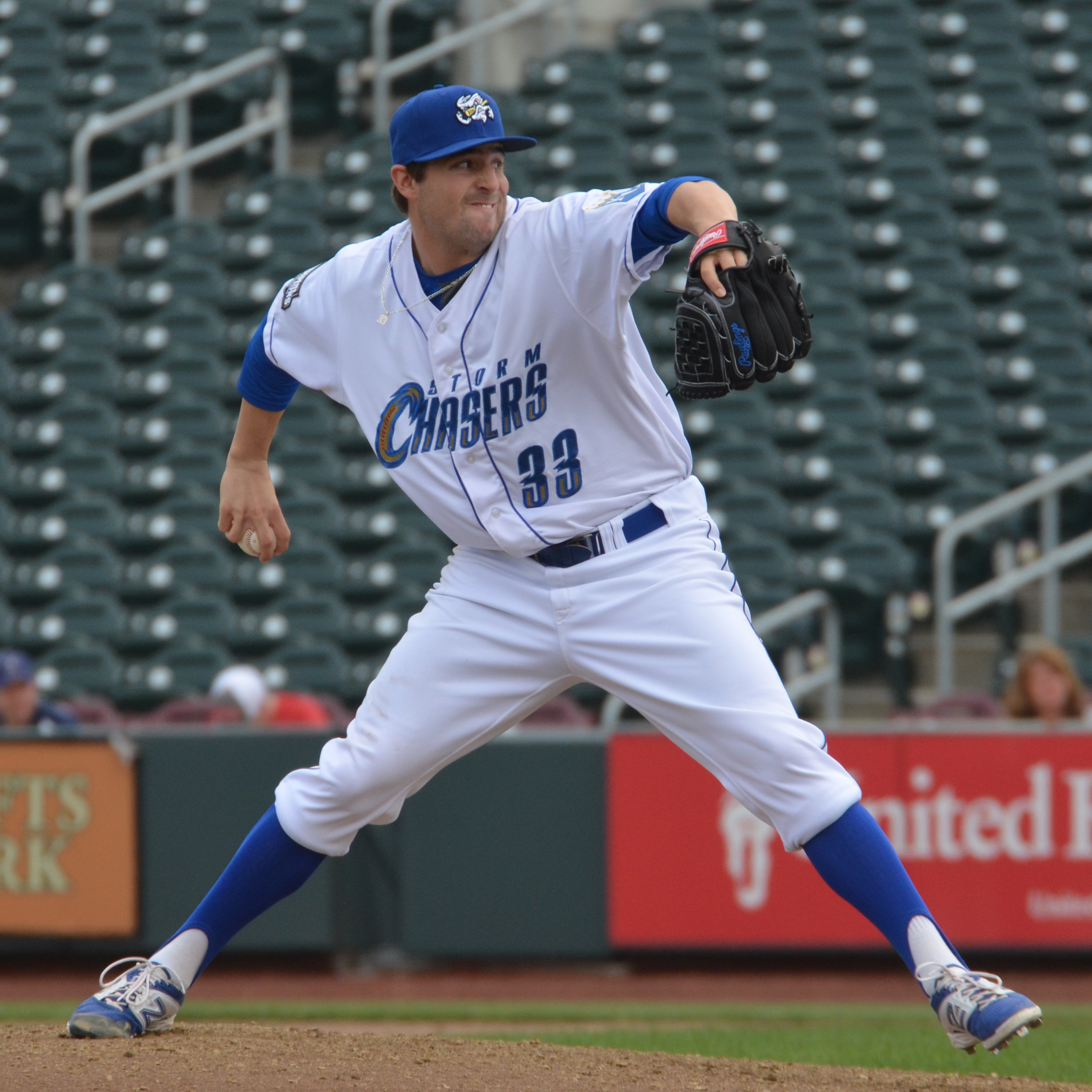
Mariot with the Omaha Storm Chasers in 2014

Mariot was drafted by the Kansas City Royals in the eighth round, with the 239th overall selection, of the 2010 Major League Baseball draft out of the University of Nebraska–Lincoln. He was added to the 40-man roster on November 20, 2013, in order to be protected from the Rule 5 draft.

Mariot was called up to the major leagues for the first time on April 7, 2014. In 17 appearances for Kansas City during his rookie campaign, Mariot posted a 1-0 record and 6.48 ERA with 21 strikeouts over 25 innings of work. He was not a part of the Royals' postseason roster, but earned his first World Series ring.

Mariot made two appearances for the Royals during the 2015 season, recording a 3.00 ERA with one strikeout over three innings of work.

=== Philadelphia Phillies ===
On November 30, 2015, the Philadelphia Phillies claimed Mariot off waivers. He was called up the Phillies on August 3, 2016, when Jeanmar Gómez was granted paternity leave for the birth of his son. Mariot made 25 appearances for Philadelphia, recording a 5.82 ERA with 23 strikeouts and two saves across 21 2/3 innings pitched.

On December 6, 2016, Mariot was designated for assignment following the signing of Joaquín Benoit. He spent the 2017 season with the Triple–A Lehigh Valley IronPigs. In 45 appearances out of the bullpen, he registered a 7–2 record and 4.42 ERA with 63 strikeouts and two saves in 57 innings of work. Mariot elected free agency following the season on November 6, 2017.

=== San Diego Padres ===
On November 21, 2017, Mariot signed a minor league contract with the San Diego Padres. Mariot was invited to Major League spring training that year as a non-roster invitee. In 10 appearances for the Triple–A El Paso Chihuahuas, he struggled to a 12.15 ERA with 14 strikeouts across 13 1/3 innings pitched. Mariot was released by the Padres organization on May 11, 2018.

=== Kansas City Royals (second stint) ===
On May 18, 2018, Mariot signed a minor league deal with the Kansas City Royals. He spent the remainder of the season split between the Double–A Northwest Arkansas Naturals (0.96 ERA in 7 games) and Triple–A Omaha Storm Chasers (3.81 ERA in 18 games). Mariot was released by the Royals organization on August 8.

=== Sugar Land Skeeters ===
On August 24, 2018, Mariot signed with the Sugar Land Skeeters of the Atlantic League of Professional Baseball. In 4 starts for the Skeeters, he recorded a 1.93 ERA with 8 strikeouts over 14 innings of work.

Mariot re-signed with the team for the 2019 season. In 8 appearances (5 starts), he compiled a 3-0 record and 3.00 ERA with 40 strikeouts across 36 innings pitched.

=== Toros de Tijuana ===
On June 5, 2019, Mariot's contract was purchased by the Toros de Tijuana of the Mexican League. In 6 appearances (5 starts) for Tijuana, he pitched to a 4-1 record and 4.56 ERA with 25 strikeouts across 23 2/3 innings pitched. Mariot was released by the Toros on July 29.

=== Tecolotes de los Dos Laredos ===
On July 29, 2019, Mariot signed with the Tecolotes de los Dos Laredos of the Mexican League. He made 2 starts for the team, logging a 1-1 record and 9.00 ERA with 9 strikeouts over 9 innings of work. Mariot became a free agent following the season.

=== Cleburne Railroaders ===
On March 29, 2021, Mariot signed with the Cleburne Railroaders of the American Association of Professional Baseball. Mariot recorded a 2–0 record and 1.00 ERA across three appearances for Cleburne.

=== Cincinnati Reds ===
On June 6, 2021, Mariot's contract was purchased by the Cincinnati Reds organization. Mariot made 19 appearances (18 of them starts) with the Triple-A Louisville Bats, working to a 6–5 record and 4.02 ERA with 83 strikeouts in 103 innings of work. He elected free agency following the season on November 7.

=== Philadelphia Phillies (second stint) ===
On March 16, 2022, Mariot signed a minor league contract with the Washington Nationals. He was released on March 23. On March 30, Mariot signed a minor league contract with the Philadelphia Phillies organization. In 11 starts for the Triple–A Lehigh Valley IronPigs, he registered a 4–1 record and 4.64 ERA with 36 strikeouts across 52 1/3 innings of work.

=== Detroit Tigers ===
On June 15, 2022, Mariot was traded to the Detroit Tigers in exchange for cash considerations. In 7 games (4 starts) for the Triple–A Toledo Mud Hens, Mariot posted a 3–1 record and 5.40 ERA with 20 strikeouts across 26 2/3 innings pitched.

=== CTBC Brothers ===
On July 24, 2022, Mariot's contract was purchased by the CTBC Brothers of the Chinese Professional Baseball League. Mariot made 5 appearances (3 starts) for the Brothers, posting a 1–3 record and 2.95 ERA with 11 strikeouts in 18.1 innings pitched. He was released by the team on September 19.

=== Cleburne Railroaders (second stint) ===
On May 2, 2023, Mariot signed with the Cleburne Railroaders of the American Association of Professional Baseball. In 5 starts for the Railroaders, Mariot registered a 1–1 record and 5.06 ERA with 29 strikeouts in 26 2/3 innings pitched.

=== Cincinnati Reds (second stint) ===
On June 10, 2023, Mariot's contract was purchased by the Cincinnati Reds, marking his second stint with the organization. In 4 starts for the Triple–A Louisville Bats, he registered a 2.59 ERA with 14 strikeouts in 24 1/3 innings pitched. On July 8, the Reds selected Mariot's contract, adding him to the major league roster. Mariot went unused out of the bullpen and was designated for assignment by the Reds the next day after Ben Lively was activated from the injured list. He cleared waivers and was sent outright to Triple–A Louisville on July 12. On September 4, Mariot was selected back to the major league roster. That day, he made his first MLB appearance since 2016, allowing one run on four hits, two strikeouts, and one walk in 2 2/3 innings of relief work. The following day, Mariot was designated for assignment following the promotion of Kevin Herget. He cleared waivers and accepted an outright assignment to Louisville on September 7. On October 2, Mariot elected free agency.

=== Seattle Mariners ===
On December 15, 2023, Mariot signed with the Diablos Rojos del México of the Mexican League. However, he was released prior to the LMB season on March 27, 2024. The following day, Mariot signed a minor league contract with the Seattle Mariners. He made 28 appearances (25 starts) for the Triple-A Tacoma Rainiers, compiling a 9-7 record and 5.84 ERA with 101 strikeouts across 126 1/3 innings pitched. Mariot elected free agency following the season on November 4.

On March 4, 2025, Mariot signed with the Diablos Rojos del México of the Mexican League. However, on April 11, Mariot signed a minor league contract to return to the Mariners organization. He made 23 appearances (eight starts) for Tacoma, compiling a 4-4 record and 5.74 ERA with 52 strikeouts over 69 innings of work. Mariot elected free agency following the season on November 6.

=== Diablos Rojos del México ===
On May 1, 2026, Mariot signed with the Diablos Rojos del México of the Mexican League. In 10 appearances (including six starts) for México, he posted a 1–1 record with a 8.59 ERA, 20 strikeouts, and 11 walks across 29 1/3 innings of work. On June 24, Mariot was released by the Diablos.

=== Kansas City Monarchs ===
On July 17, 2026, Mariot signed with the Kansas City Monarchs of the American Association of Professional Baseball.
