= César Hernández (infielder) =

Venezuelan baseball player (born 1990)

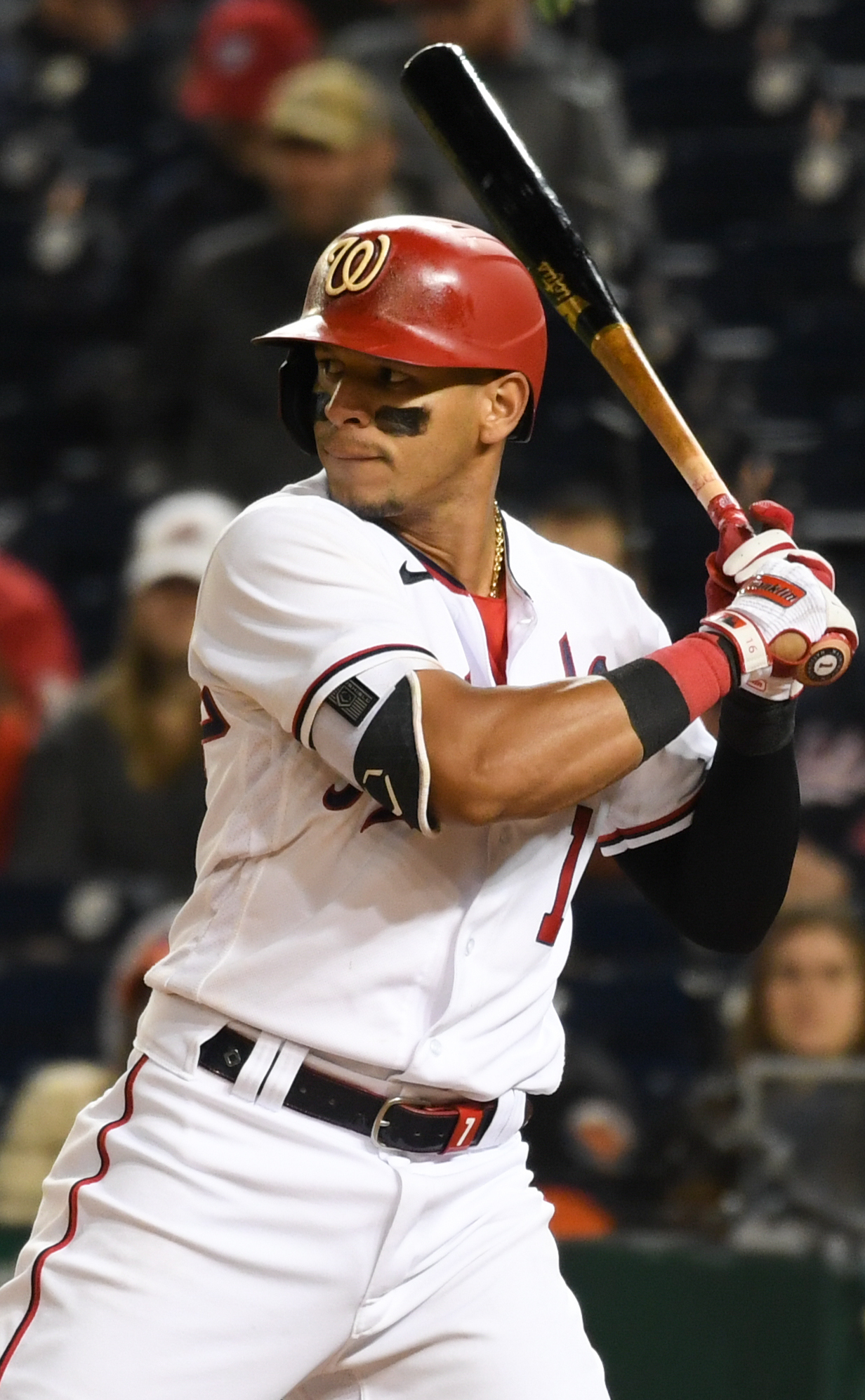
- Hernández with the Washington Nationals in 2022

Centauros de La Guaira – No. 7
- Second baseman
- Born: May 23, 1990 (age 36); Valencia, Venezuela
- Batted: Switch Threw: Right

MLB debut
- May 29, 2013, for the Philadelphia Phillies

Last MLB appearance
- October 5, 2022, for the Washington Nationals

MLB statistics
- Batting average: .267
- Home runs: 71
- Runs batted in: 369
- Stats at Baseball Reference

Teams
- Philadelphia Phillies (2013–2019); Cleveland Indians (2020–2021); Chicago White Sox (2021); Washington Nationals (2022)

Career highlights and awards
- Gold Glove Award (2020)

César Augusto Hernández (pronounced SAY-zahr; born May 23, 1990) is a Venezuelan professional baseball second baseman for the Centauros de La Guaira of the Venezuelan Major League. He played in Major League Baseball (MLB) for the Philadelphia Phillies, Cleveland Indians, Chicago White Sox, and Washington Nationals.

On July 2, 2006, the Phillies signed Hernández as an undrafted amateur free agent, at the age of 16. He made his major league debut during the 2013 season. In 2016, he led the major leagues in bunt hits, and led the National League (NL) in infield hits and triples. In 2018, he tied for the major league lead in bunt hits.

== Career ==
=== 2007–10; Early minor league career ===
Hernández was born in Valencia, Carabobo, in Venezuela, where he also resides in the offseason. He attended Unidad Educativa Cabriales, where he played basketball, volleyball, and baseball.

Phillies' scouts Sal Agostinelli and Jesus Mendez signed him as an amateur free agent on July 2, 2006, at age 16. Hernández began his professional career in 2007, spending his first two seasons with the Venezuelan Summer League (VSL) Phillies. That year, he hit .276./328/.436 with 8 triples (leading the league) and 7 sacrifice hits (4th) in 54 games; he committed 15 errors. In the Venezuelan Summer League again in 2008, Hernández hit .315 (8th in the league)/.412 (6th)/.426 with 6 triples (tied for the league lead) and 19 stolen bases (4th) in 60 games, reducing his error total to 8. Between his two seasons in the VSL, he made 59 starts as a second baseman and 35 starts as a shortstop.

He advanced a level in 2009, joining the Gulf Coast League (GCL) Phillies, with whom he played solely second base, and hit .267/.351/.313 with 13 stolen bases (tied for 7th in the league) in 41 games. He also participated in the Florida Instructional League during the 2009 season.

Hernandez's improvement earned him another promotion in 2010, when he advanced to the Williamsport Crosscutters of the New York–Penn League (NY-Penn), with whom he enjoyed significant success. He was named an NY-Penn League Mid-Season All Star, and his teammates voted him as their Most Valuable Player (MVP). In 2010, he hit .325 (5th in the league)/.390/.392, including .391 against left-handed pitchers, and added 32 stolen bases (2nd in the league). After the season, he played in the Venezuelan Winter League as a member of the Bravos de Margarita, the first of several seasons after which he would return home and continue to play baseball.

=== 2011–12; Upper levels of the minor leagues ===
Entering the 2011 season, Baseball America ranked Hernández the Phillies 14th-best prospect. John Sickels, a minor league baseball analyst for SBNation.com, noted that, entering the 2011 season, Hernández was an "overlooked" prospect with upper-echelon speed. In 2011, he played for the Clearwater Threshers, the Phillies' affiliate in Class A-Advanced, and hit .268/.306/.333, with 4 home runs and 37 runs batted in (RBIs). It was the first season during which he played in more than 100 games, appearing in 119, all at second base.

In 2012, he split time between the Reading Phillies and Lehigh Valley IronPigs, the Phillies Double-A (AA) and Triple-A (AAA) affiliates respectively. With Reading, he tied for the league lead in triples, with 11, and was second in the league in sacrifice hits, with 10. He combined to hit .291/.329/.404 with 2 home runs and 57 RBIs, stealing 21 bases. He was an Eastern League mid-season and post-season All Star for his performance with Reading, earning his call-up to Lehigh Valley in August. Baseball America ranked him the Phillies best defensive infielder after the 2012 season, and MiLB.com named him a Philadelphia Organization All Star.

=== Philadelphia Phillies ===
==== 2013–2014 ====
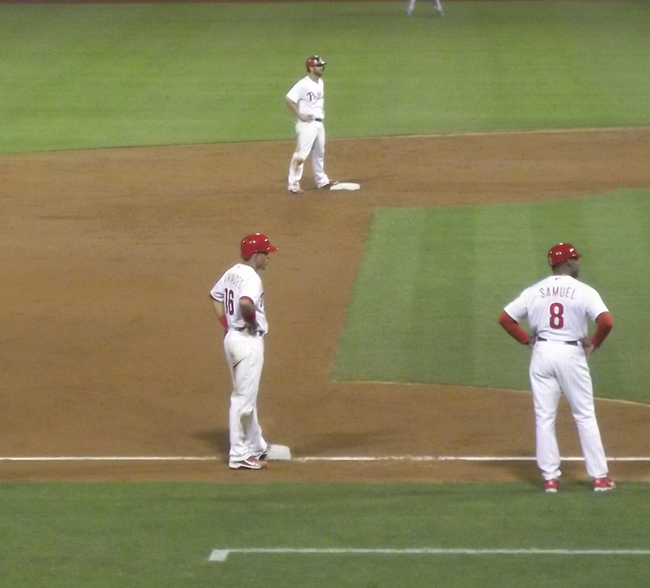
Cesar Hernandez stands on third base with third base coach Juan Samuel

Hernández began the 2013 season in AAA, but in May, Michael Young was placed on bereavement leave, and Hernández was promoted to the major leagues to fill Young's roster spot. On May 29, he made his debut, pinch hitting for Antonio Bastardo. Shortly after, he was optioned to the AAA Lehigh Valley IronPigs, with whom he was named to the International League mid-season and post-season All-Star teams, as he batted .309 (3rd in the league)/.375/.402, led the league in triples (9), and was 4th in the league in stolen bases (32). He was the International League Batter of the Week on July 7. In July, when Ben Revere sustained an injury, he was converted to a center fielder, a conversion he made quickly and effectively, garnering a call-up to the big leagues, as he was a "pleasant surprise". His manager, Dave Brundage, commented, "He's done very well offensively and now they're trying to see if we can create a spot or find a spot and see if it's a fit or not." MiLB.com named him a Philadelphia Organization All Star. While with the big-league club, Hernández played in 34 games, batting .289/.344/.331 to go along with 10 RBIs.

After the season, Hernández traveled to his native Venezuela to play for the Venezuelan Winter League Bravos de Margarita, with whom he hit .254/.318/.347, with 2 home runs and 15 RBIs. He stopped playing prior to the end of the season to rest prior to Phillies spring training. He had played with Bravos de Margarita in the winters since the 2010 season.

Entering the 2014 season, Hernández drew comparisons to fellow reserve Freddy Galvis. While Galvis could play shortstop and had experience in the corner outfield positions, Hernández could play center field and was a natural second baseman, and with Chase Utley's frequent injuries, Hernández would likely see time there. Both players were expected to see significant time with the big-league team, predominantly due to the established core – players such as Utley, Ryan Howard, and Jimmy Rollins – being relatively old (in 2013, the Phillies average age was 28.4, the third-oldest in the Major Leagues) and injury-prone over the preceding several seasons, leaving ample playing time for replacements such as Hernández, especially considering the fact that he would be able to continue his development in the minor leagues after MLB granted the Phillies a fourth option year, essentially meaning that they could keep him in the minor leagues during the season without him having to clear waivers. Ultimately, he began the season on the major league roster, but was sent down to Reading (AA) in April to focus on honing his defensive skills at third base and shortstop. In 2014 with the Phillies, he batted .237/.290/.281 with one home run, four RBIs, and one stolen base. In 2014 between Reading and Lehigh Valley, he batted .290/.358/.394 with 3 home runs, 24 RBIs, and 8 stolen bases.

==== 2015–2017 ====
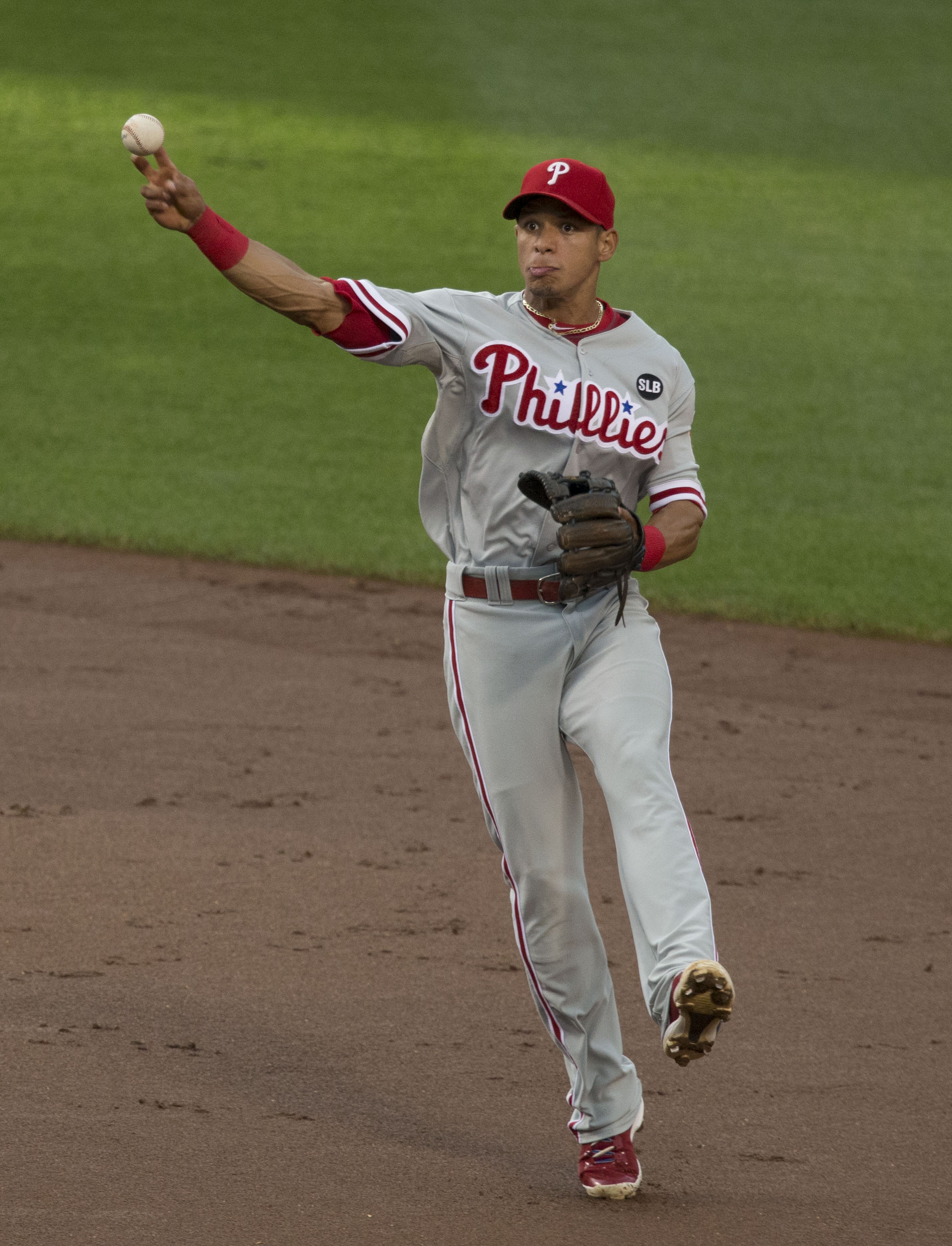
Hernández with the Philadelphia Phillies in 2015

Entering 2015, analysts doubted his future with the major league club out of spring training, as several attempts to broaden Hernández's defensive versatility had failed. After Chase Utley was injured, Hernández saw more playing time at second base and performed well enough that he was named starting second baseman even upon Utley's return, and eventually Utley was traded. Hernández ended up being a "highlight in an otherwise pathetic showing" for the Phillies, who finished with 99 losses on the season. Hernández had a 12-game hitting streak from June 26 to July 7, 2015. He batted .272/.339/.348 with one home run, 35 RBIs, and 19 stolen bases, and tied for 5th in the NL in bunt hits (7), for 6th in sacrifice hits (4), and for 9th in infield hits (22).

Most anticipated Hernández would start at second base on Opening Day in 2016, not necessarily because he was exceedingly good, but because there was no one else to replace him, and on a rebuilding club, an upgrade was not a high priority.

In 2016, he batted .294/.371/.393 with 6 home runs, 39 RBIs, and 17 stolen bases. Hernández led the major leagues in bunt hits, with 15 (the most by any Phillie since Larry Bowa also had 15, in 1975), and led the National League in infield hits (34) and triples (11), as he was tied for 6th in the league in sacrifice hits (6). On defense, he led NL second basemen in double plays turned, with 102.

Hernández began the Phillies' 2017 season by hitting a leadoff home run on Opening Day, April 3, at Cincinnati. He was the first Phillie to hit a leadoff homer on Opening Day since Heinie Mueller in 1938, and the first in the majors since Alfonso Soriano in 2009.

In 2017, he batted .294/.373/.421 with a career-high 26 doubles, 9 home runs, 34 RBIs, and 15 stolen bases. Hernández was 2nd in the NL in infield hits (35) and bunt hits (9), and tied for 6th in triples (6).

==== 2018–2019 ====
In 2018, he fouled a pitch off his right foot in early July, breaking it, but played with a broken foot for much of the second half of the season as his injury wasn't serious enough to require surgery. Hernández played all but one game during the season. In 2018, Hernández batted .253/.356/.362 with a career-high 95 walks (5th in the NL), 91 runs, 15 home runs, 60 RBIs, and 19 stolen bases. He led the majors in total pitches faced (3,009), and walks when leading off an inning (33), tied for the major league lead in bunt hits (8), was 2nd in the National League in plate appearances (708), 3rd in infield hits (26), 4th in pitches/plate appearance (4.25), 6th in games played (161), and 9th in strikeouts (155) and times on base (252). He had the fastest baserunning sprint speed of all major league second basemen, at 29.2 feet/second. On defense, he led all NL second basemen in errors, with 12. His broken foot later healed.

In January 2019, Hernández agreed to a one-year, $7.75 million contract with the Phillies.

In 2019, Hernández batted .279/.333/.408 in 161 games (2nd in the National League) with 612 at bats (7th), 45 walks, 77 runs, 123 singles (2nd), a career-high 31 doubles, 14 home runs, 71 RBIs, and 9 stolen bases, and led the NL in infield hits (22). On December 2, 2019, he was non-tendered by the Phillies, making him a free agent.

=== Cleveland Indians ===
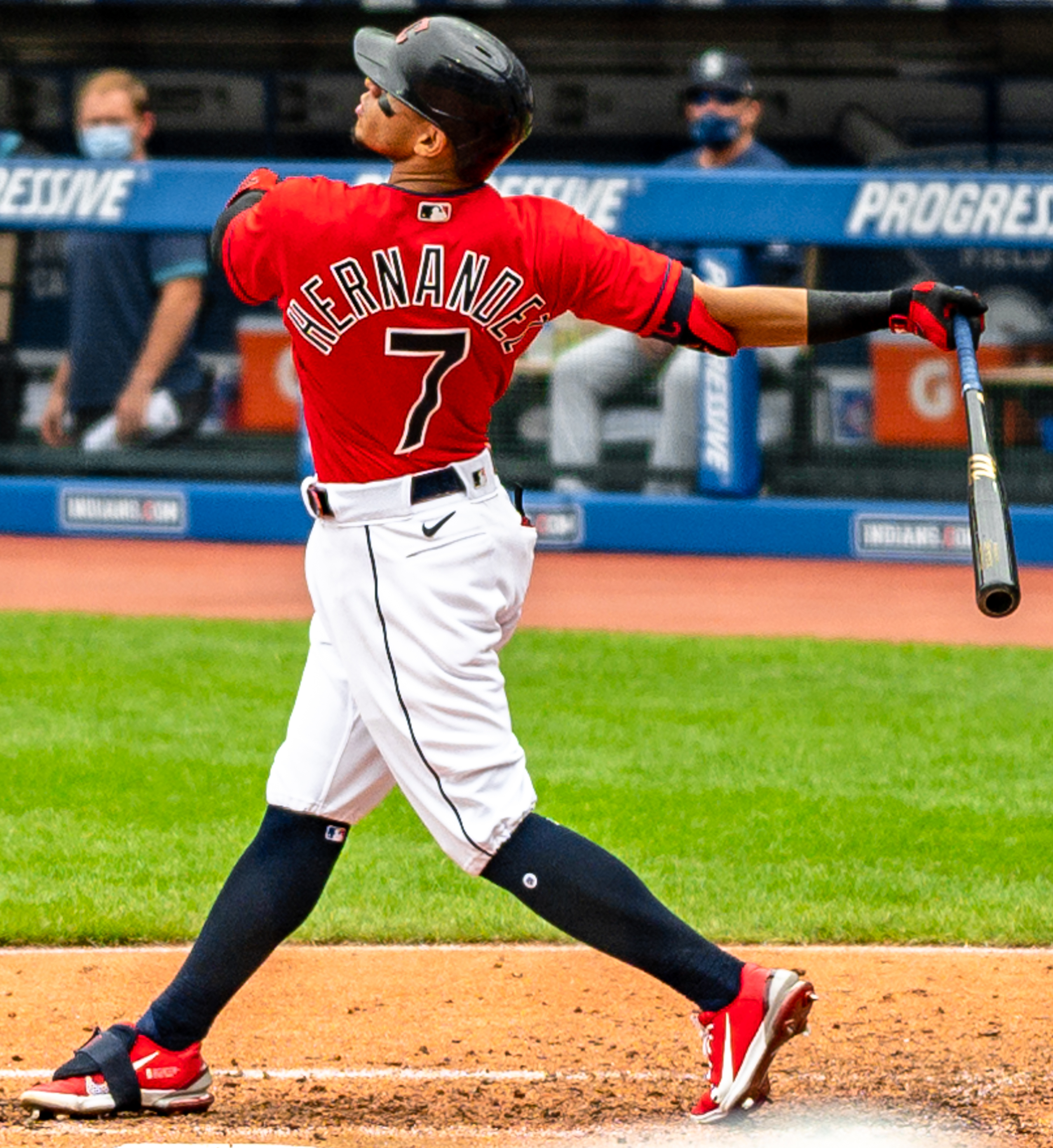
Hernandez in 2021 with the Indians.

On December 29, 2019, Hernández signed a one-year contract with the Cleveland Indians. Overall with the 2020 Cleveland Indians, Hernández batted .283/.355/.408 with a league-leading 20 doubles, three home runs, and 20 RBIs in 58 games. He also earned his first career Gold Glove Award after finishing second among American League second basemen in defensive runs saved and posting a .981 fielding percentage. Hernández became a free agent following the 2020 season.

On January 29, 2021, Hernández re-signed with the Indians on a one-year, $5 million contract with a club option for the 2022 season. In 96 games for the Indians in 2021, Hernández hit .231 with 18 home runs and 47 RBI's.

=== Chicago White Sox ===
On July 29, 2021, Hernández was traded to the Chicago White Sox in exchange for pitcher Konnor Pilkington. He immediately took on the role of the team's new everyday second baseman, rarely sitting out a game. On August 6, he hit his first White Sox home run off of Kyle Ryan of the Chicago Cubs. On September 23, during the same game in which the White Sox clinched the American League Central division title, he went 3-for-3, with one of his hits being the 1000th in his Major League career.

=== Washington Nationals ===
On November 30, 2021, Hernández signed a one-year, $4.5 million contract with the Washington Nationals. After going without a home run for the entirety of the 2022 season, on September 4, 2022, Hernández hit his first home run of the year. The blast came off of Trevor Williams in a 7–1 victory over the New York Mets. He appeared in 147 games for Washington in 2022, slashing .248/.311/.318 with just one home run to go along with 34 RBI and 10 stolen bases.

=== Seattle Mariners ===
On January 25, 2023, Hernández signed a minor league contract with the Detroit Tigers organization. On March 27, Hernández requested and was granted his release after not making the Opening Day roster. On March 31, he signed a new minor league contract with the Seattle Mariners. He played in 43 games for the Triple-A Tacoma Rainiers, hitting .272/.436/.336 with no home runs, 14 RBI, and 7 stolen bases. On June 1, Hernández opted out of his minor league contract and became a free agent.

=== Centauros de La Guaira ===
On February 19, 2026, Hernández signed with the Centauros de La Guaira of the Venezuelan Major League.

== Personal ==
Especially while he was in the minor leagues, Hernández spoke predominantly Spanish, and was uncomfortable speaking English with those he did not know well. As of January 2019, he knew some English but spoke almost entirely in Spanish.

Hernández is married to Gabriela Altuve, and has two children, the first born in 2014 and the second in 2020.

== See also ==
- List of Major League Baseball players from Venezuela
