= Colton Murray =

American baseball player (born 1990)

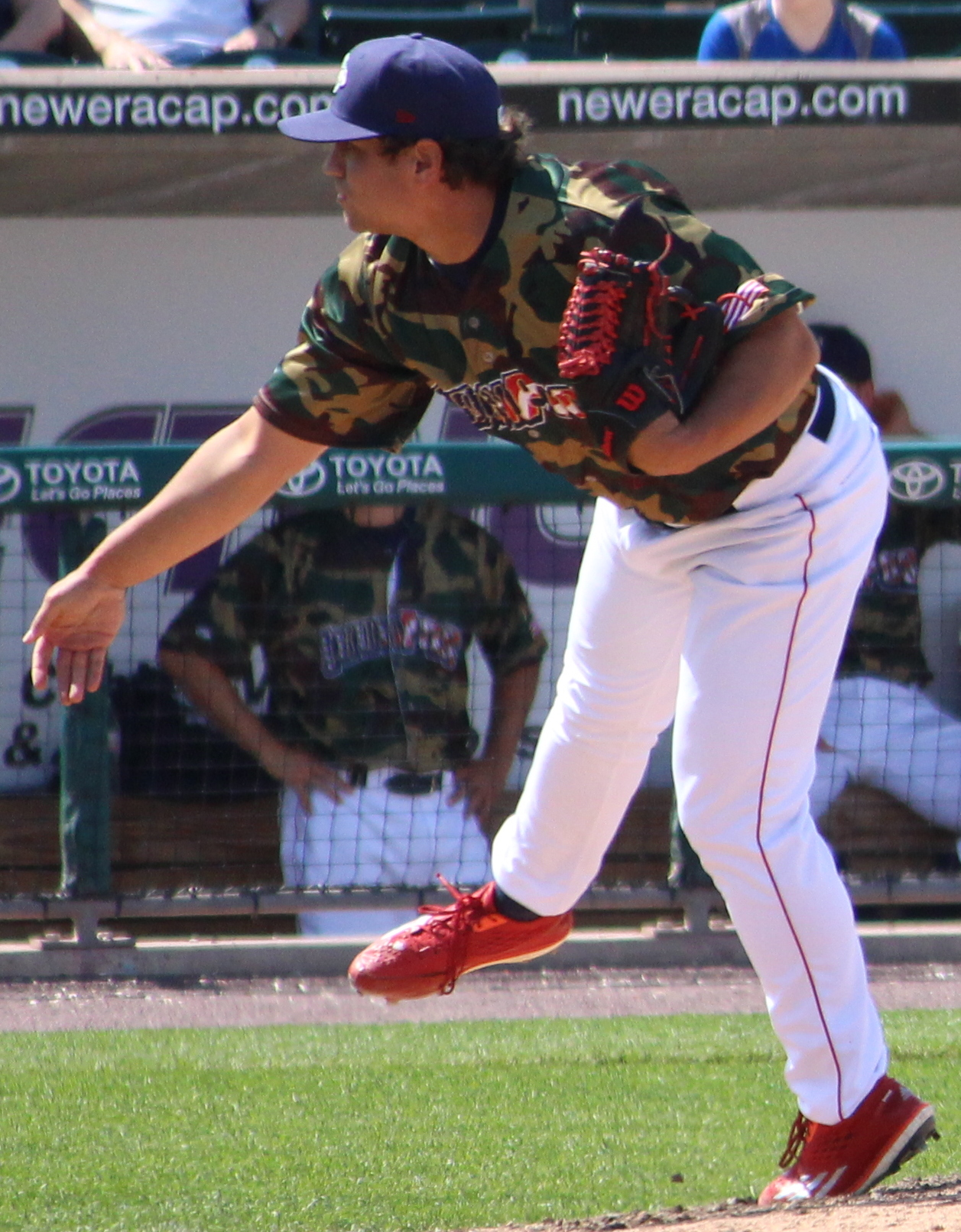
- Murray with the Lehigh Valley IronPigs
- Pitcher
- Born: April 22, 1990 (age 36); Overland Park, Kansas, U.S.
- Batted: Right Threw: Right

MLB debut
- September 2, 2015, for the Philadelphia Phillies

Last MLB appearance
- October 2, 2016, for the Philadelphia Phillies

MLB statistics
- Win–loss record: 1–2
- Earned run average: 6.18
- Strikeouts: 40
- Stats at Baseball Reference

Teams
- Philadelphia Phillies (2015–2016)

Colton Murray (born April 22, 1990) is an American former professional baseball relief pitcher. He played in Major League Baseball (MLB) for the Philadelphia Phillies. Murray signed with the team after being selected in the 13th round of the 2011 Major League Baseball draft.

== Amateur career ==
Murray attended Olathe East High School in Olathe, Kansas, where he lettered three years in baseball for coach John McDonald. He was a two-time All-State selection in 2007 and 2008, and was named Kansas Pitcher of the Year in 2007. As a senior, he went 5–1 with a 1.55 ERA, striking out 50 hitters in 31 2/3 innings. He also hit .481 with three home runs.

Murray went on to play at the University of Kansas, where as a freshman in 2009 he went 2–3 with an ERA of 3.23, and also striking out 39 batters in 39 innings pitched. In his sophomore year in 2010, he posted a record of 1–2 with an ERA of 4.83 in 27 appearances, recording 36 strikeouts and four saves, also earning Academic All-Big 12 honors. As a junior in 2011, he went 3–4 with an ERA of 3.79 and seven saves in 20 appearances, recording 33 strikeouts.

Murray played for the Pittsfield American Defenders in summer 2009, posting a record of 1–1 and an ERA of 3.27 in 10 appearances, recording 16 strikeouts and only 3 walks as well. In summer 2010, he played for the Brewster Whitecaps of the Cape Cod League where he was named a league all-star and posted a record of 1–1 with an ERA of 0.49 and eight saves in 18 appearances. Named a Top 30 Prospect in the league by ESPN's Keith Law.

== Professional career ==
=== Philadelphia Phillies ===
Murray was drafted by the Philadelphia Phillies in the 13th round, with the 421st overall selection, of the 2011 Major League Baseball draft. He made his professional debut with the Low-A Williamsport Crosscutters. In 2012, Murray split the season between the Single-A Lakewood BlueClaws and High-A Clearwater Threshers. In 44 appearances out of the bullpen, he accumulated a 3.73 ERA with 62 strikeouts and 8 saves across 60 1/3 innings pitched.

Murray made 47 appearances for Clearwater in 2013, posting a 5-7 record and 5.02 ERA with 75 strikeouts and 11 saves across 66 1/3 innings pitched. He split the 2014 season between Clearwater and the Double-A Reading Fightin Phils. In 47 appearances for the two affiliates, Murray compiled a 3-7 record and 2.23 ERA with 77 strikeouts and 8 saves over 76 2/3 innings of work. In 2015, he made 52 appearances split between Reading and the Triple-A Lehigh Valley IronPigs. In 52 combined appearances for the two affiliates, Murray registered an 8-3 record and 2.67 ERA with 77 strikeouts across 77 2/3 innings pitched.

On September 1, 2015, Murray was selected to the 40-man roster and promoted to the major leagues for the first time. In 8 games for the Phillies during his rookie campaign, he posted a 5.87 with 9 strikeouts over 7 2/3 innings of work.

Murray made 24 appearances for the Phillies in 2016, compiling a 1-1 record and 6.25 ERA with 31 strikeouts across 31 2/3 innings pitched. On October 7, 2016, Murray was removed from the 40-man roster and sent outright to Triple-A Lehigh Valley.

Murray split the 2017 season between the Double–A Reading and Triple–A Lehigh Valley. In 41 total appearances, he accumulated a 4.58 ERA with 63 strikeouts and 3 saves in 53 innings of work. Murray elected free agency following the season on November 6, 2017.

=== Miami Marlins ===
On December 14, 2017, Murray signed a minor league contract with the Tampa Bay Rays. He was released prior to the start of the season on March 28, 2018.

On April 2, 2018, Murray signed a minor league contract with the Miami Marlins. In 4 games for the Triple–A New Orleans Baby Cakes, he struggled to a 17.36 ERA with 2 strikeouts across 4 2/3 innings pitched. Murray was released by the Marlins organization on June 4.

=== Long Island Ducks ===
On June 13, 2018, Murray signed with the Long Island Ducks of the Atlantic League of Professional Baseball. In 24 appearances for the Ducks, he struggled to an 0-2 record and 6.86 ERA with 24 strikeouts across 21 innings of relief. Murray became a free agent following the season.
