= Sal Agostinelli =

American baseball player (born 1961)

Salvatore Peter Agostinelli (born September 4, 1961) has served many roles in professional baseball. He played in the minor leagues mostly as a catcher, coached and scouted. He is now the International Scouting Director for the Philadelphia Phillies.

== Early life ==
Agostinelli was born in Bronx, New York and grew up in Deer Park, New York. He attended Half Hollow Hills East High School in Dix Hills, New York. He later attended Slippery Rock University of Pennsylvania, where he hit .466 in 1981 – which was a record at the time and is still the third best mark in school history. He hit .417 with 25 stolen bases in 38 games in 1982.

== Playing career ==
He was drafted by the St. Louis Cardinals in the 22nd round of the 1983 Major League Baseball draft and began his professional career that season. He traveled throughout the Cardinals organization, reaching Triple-A – the level just before the major leagues – for the first time in 1987. He was assigned to major league training camp in 1988 and played at Triple-A again that year. He joined the Philadelphia Phillies organization in 1989, after being let go by the Cardinals. He played in their system – reaching Triple-A in 1990 and 1991, again earning an invitation to major league training camp that year – until 1992.

In his 10-year career, Agostinelli hit .245 with 433 hits, 3 home runs, 191 RBI, 53 stolen bases, 226 walks and 153 strikeouts in 657 games.

== Post-playing career ==
Agostinelli has remained with the Phillies organization since his playing career concluded.

Though he played in a single game in 1992, he spent most of the year as a coach for the Martinsville Phillies of the Appalachian League. He became a scout the next year and worked as an area scout until 1996, eventually becoming the northeast scouting supervisor. In 1997, he was offered the role of international scouting director, which he accepted.

As a scout, he signed numerous future major league players, including pitcher Carlos Carrasco, pitcher Lendy Castillo, infielder Jose Flores, second baseman Freddy Galvis, outfielder César Hernández, pitcher Elizardo Ramírez, pitcher Carlos Silva and pitcher Alfredo Simón. He is also credited with helping discover All-Star catcher Carlos Ruiz.

Outside of his work with the Phillies, he runs Sal Agostinelli Baseball Training on Long Island.

He was elected to the Slippery Rock University Hall of Fame in 1995. He won the Lou DeMartino Lifetime Achievement Award in 2012.

Sal was awarded the Dallas Green Award for 2015. He was inducted into the Suffolk Sports Hall of Fame during 2020.
