= Jeanmar Gómez =

Venezuelan baseball player (born 1988)

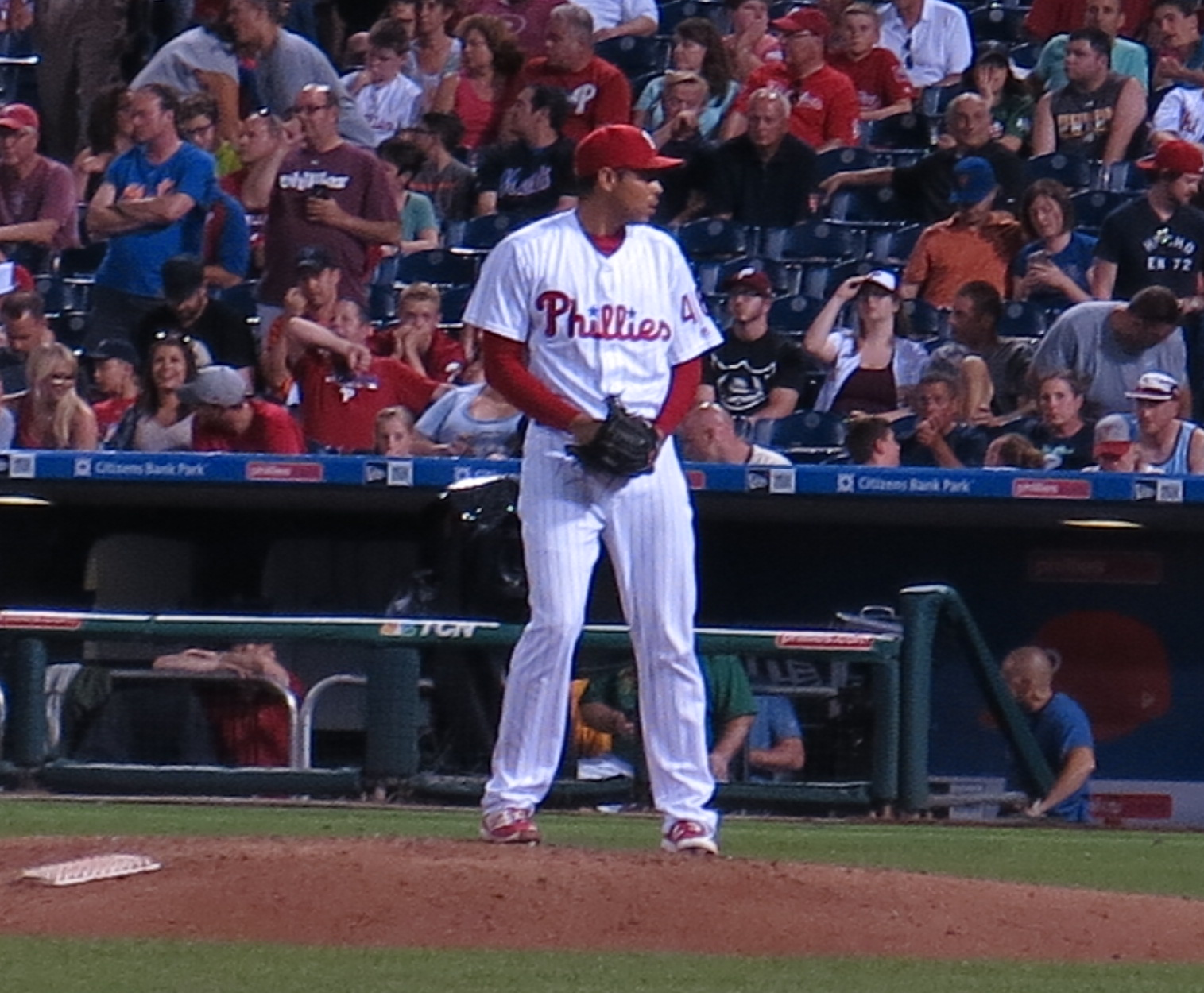
- Gómez with the Philadelphia Phillies
- Pitcher
- Born: February 10, 1988 (age 38); Caracas, Venezuela
- Batted: Right Threw: Right

MLB debut
- July 18, 2010, for the Cleveland Indians

Last MLB appearance
- May 19, 2019, for the Texas Rangers

MLB statistics
- Win–loss record: 28–30
- Earned run average: 4.51
- Strikeouts: 358
- Saves: 40
- Stats at Baseball Reference

Teams
- Cleveland Indians (2010–2012); Pittsburgh Pirates (2013–2014); Philadelphia Phillies (2015–2017); Chicago White Sox (2018); Texas Rangers (2019)

Jeanmar Alejandro Gómez (born February 10, 1988) is a Venezuelan former professional baseball pitcher. He played in Major League Baseball (MLB) for the Cleveland Indians, Pittsburgh Pirates, Philadelphia Phillies, Chicago White Sox, and Texas Rangers.

== Career ==
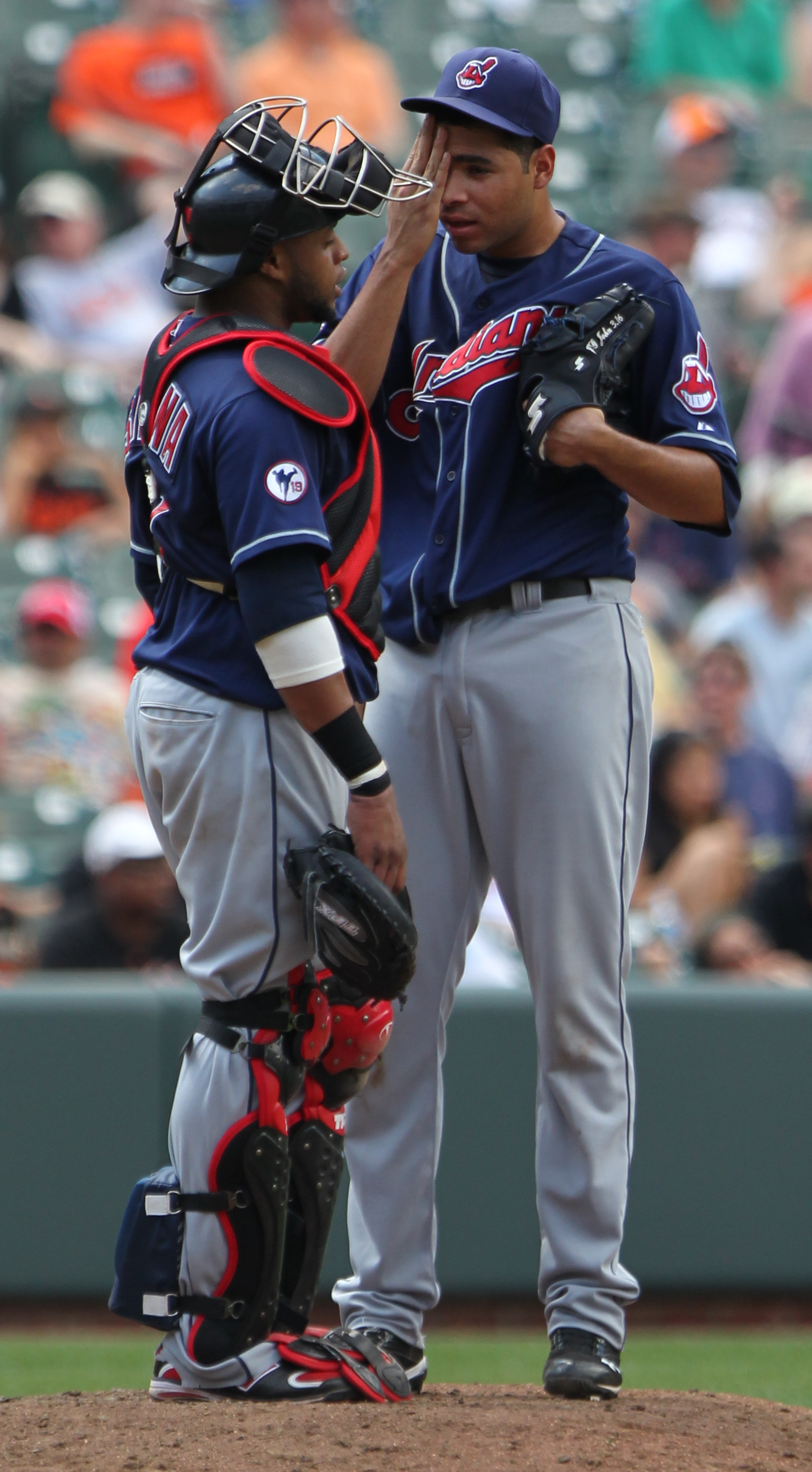
Gómez with Cleveland

=== Cleveland Indians ===
A native of Caracas, Venezuela, Gómez was signed by the Cleveland Indians as an undrafted free agent.

Since 2006, Gómez has played in the minors with the Gulf Coast League Indians, Lake County Captains, Kinston Indians, Akron Aeros, and the Columbus Clippers.

On May 21, 2009 Gómez pitched a nine-inning perfect game for Akron against the host Trenton Thunder at Waterfront Park. It was the first perfect game in Aeros team history and just the second nine-inning perfect game in Eastern League history, dating back to 1923.

On July 18, 2010 Gómez was called up to the Cleveland Indians from the Columbus Clippers to make his Major League Baseball debut in a spot start against the Detroit Tigers. He entered the game knowing it was his only start before returning to the minor leagues, even though he notched a "lights out" performance, throwing seven innings while surrendering only two unearned runs.

On April 14, 2012 Gómez was ejected after hitting the Kansas City Royals' third baseman Mike Moustakas. The benches had already been warned after Indian's outfielder Shin-Soo Choo was hit by a pitch.

Gómez got his first major league hit on June 12, 2012, off Cincinnati Reds pitcher Johnny Cueto.

On January 2, 2013, Gómez was designated for assignment by the Indians to make room on the roster for Russ Canzler who was claimed from the Blue Jays.

=== Pittsburgh Pirates ===
On January 9, 2013, Gómez was traded to the Pittsburgh Pirates in exchange for outfielder Quincy Latimore. Quite inconsistent in Cleveland, he found stability in the back end of Pittsburgh's rotation after improving during spring training. The recipient of direction from pitching coach Ray Searage to avoid moving his head so much, he simplified approach helped him post a 2.76 ERA during his first eight starts. During the second half of the season, he worked out of the bullpen, and ultimately compiled a 3–0 record with a 3.35 ERA, an improvement of more than 2.5 earned runs per nine innings from the prior season.

Entering 2014, Gómez was a candidate to work in long relief, particularly because he was out of options. He pitched in 44 games – all out of the bullpen – totaling 62 innings and posting a 3.19 ERA, but overall was "underwhelming". He was designated for assignment on October 25, and subsequently became a free agent.

=== Philadelphia Phillies ===
On January 8, 2015, Gómez signed a minor league contract with the Philadelphia Phillies. Although he had experience both as a starter and a reliever, he projected to work mainly in middle relief for the Phillies, assuming he made the club out of spring training, which he did, one of seven Venezuelans on the Phillies' roster, the most in the major leagues. Working exclusively out of the bullpen, he pitched in 65 games, and posted a 3.01 ERA with a 3:1 strikeout to walk ratio. That walk rate was the best of his career, and he increased the velocity of his fastball as well. He successfully reinvented himself to be a serviceable middle reliever on a subpar team, and to that end, was retained for the 2016 season.

To begin the 2016 season, the Phillies used Gómez as in middle relief. On April 9, 2016, he recorded his first save of the season in a game against the New York Mets. Following the game, the Phillies named him as their closer.

Gómez began the 2017 year in an unusual way as he allowed two home runs in his first three appearances. On April 10, 2017, he was removed from the closer role and replaced by Joaquin Benoit. Gomez continued to struggle with his command, allowing seven home runs in under 25 innings. On June 20, he was designated for assignment by the Phillies. He was released three days later.

=== Milwaukee Brewers ===
On July 15, 2017, Gómez signed a minor league contract with the Brewers. He opted out of the contract on August 7.

=== Seattle Mariners ===
On August 12, 2017, Gómez signed a minor league contract with the Seattle Mariners. He was released on August 26.

=== Chicago White Sox ===
On February 8, 2018, Gómez signed a minor league contract with the Chicago White Sox. He had his contract selected to the major league roster on July 11. He became a free agent following the season

=== Texas Rangers ===
On January 9, 2019, Gomez signed a minor-league contract with an invite to 2019 major league spring training with the Texas Rangers. On March 23, 2019, the Rangers announced that Gomez had made the opening day roster. Gomez was designated for assignment on May 27 and released on June 1.

== Pitching style ==
Gómez relies primarily on a sinker that he grips like a two-seam fastball, that ranges from about 90–92 miles per hour (145–148 km/h), as well as a slider and a changeup, the latter of which he uses primarily against left-handed hitters. Very occasionally, he mixes in a cutter. Over time, both his two seam fastball and slider have improved in terms of movement according to Carlos Santana, who served as the catcher for him both at the minor league and major league levels.

== See also ==
- List of Major League Baseball players from Venezuela
