= 2018 Miami Marlins season =

2018 Miami Marlins
- League: National League
- Division: East
- Ballpark: Marlins Park
- City: Miami, Florida
- Record: 63–98 (.391)
- Divisional place: 5th
- Owners: Marlins TEAMCO FC (Bruce Sherman, Derek Jeter, Michael Jordan )
- President of baseball operations: Michael Hill
- Managers: Don Mattingly
- Television: Fox Sports Florida; Sun Sports (English: Paul Severino, Todd Hollandsworth) (Spanish: Raul Striker Jr., Cookie Rojas)
- Radio: WINZ; Miami Marlins Radio Network (English) (Dave Van Horne, Glenn Geffner); WAQI (Spanish) (Luis Quintana)

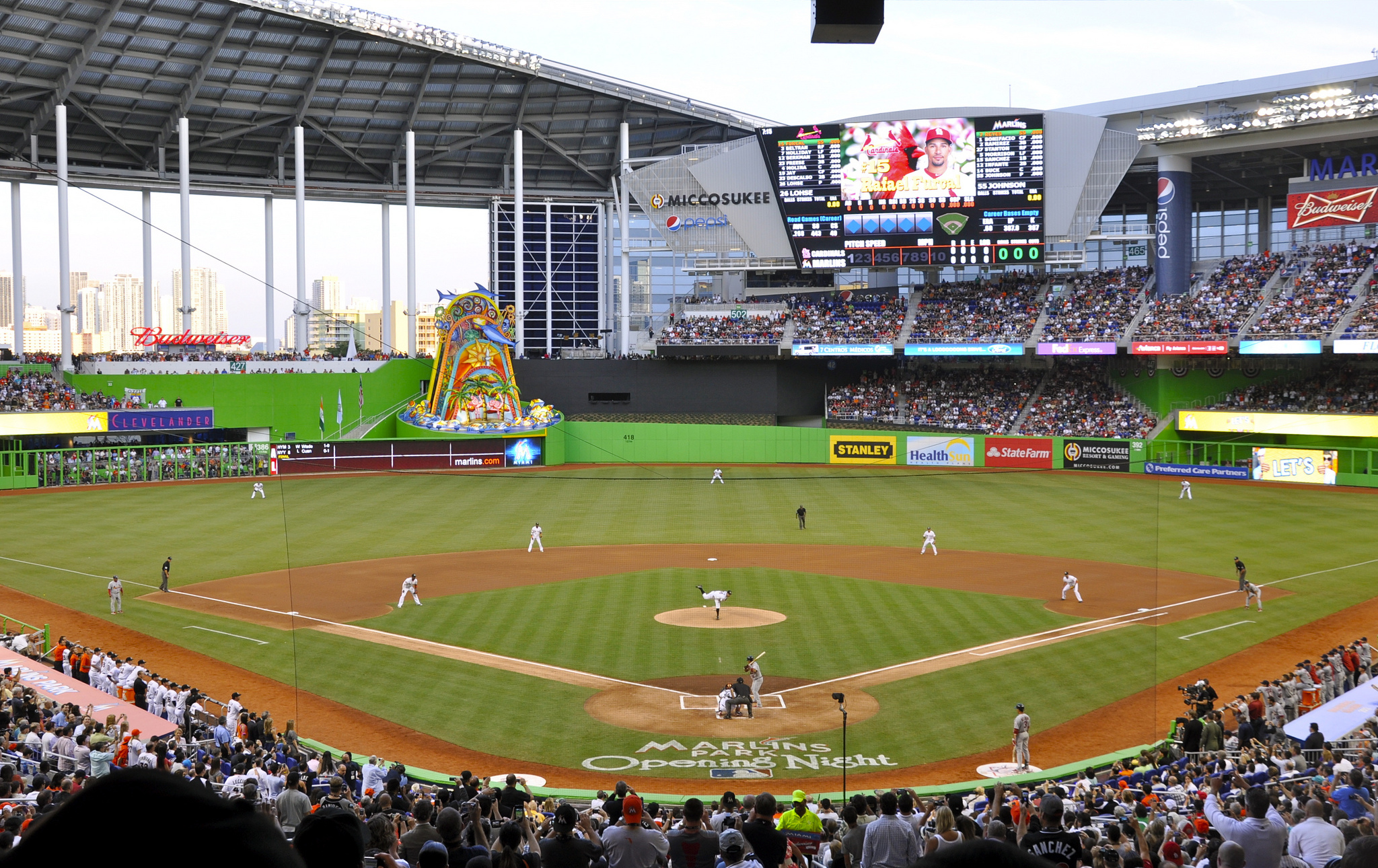

The Miami Marlins' 2018 season was the 26th season for the Major League Baseball (MLB) franchise in the National League and the seventh as the "Miami" Marlins. Don Mattingly was the manager of the Marlins for a third year. The Marlins played their home games at Marlins Park as members of the National League East. They failed to make the playoffs for the 15th consecutive season.

This year marked the first season under the new ownership group led by Derek Jeter and Bruce Sherman.

This was the team's first season since 2012 without right fielder Christian Yelich on the roster, as he was traded to the Milwaukee Brewers on January 25.

== Offseason ==
=== Ownership ===
On October 2, 2017, following the conclusion of the 2017 season, the Marlins were officially sold to a group led by Derek Jeter and Bruce Sherman for $1.2 billion.

=== The Jeter era ===
The deal that made Derek Jeter CEO of the Marlins was closed the day after the Marlins concluded the 2017 season. Jeter has roughly 4 percent stake in the ownership group, while Sherman has about 46 percent.

As CEO, Jeter plans to measure the success of the Marlins by more than just the score. Emphasis will be placed on the overall fan experience and embracing the culture in Miami.

=== Trades ===
On Dec. 7, 2017, the Marlins traded Dee Gordon and $1 million in international slot money to the Seattle Mariners for 3 minor leaguers. Two days later, the Marlins traded Giancarlo Stanton and $30 million in contract relief to the New York Yankees for Starlin Castro and two minor leaguers. The deal was made official on Dec. 11.

On Dec. 19, 2017, the Marlins traded Marcell Ozuna to the St. Louis Cardinals for two minor leaguers.

On Jan. 25, 2018, the Marlins traded Christian Yelich to the Milwaukee Brewers for Lewis Brinson and three other minor leaguers.

=== Jose Ureña ===
On August 15, 2018, starting pitcher Jose Ureña intentionally hit Ronald Acuña with a 98 MPH fastball on the elbow resulting to an ejection and controversy of the situation with the benches clearing.

== Regular season ==
=== Season standings ===
NL East
Team	W	L	Pct.	GB	Home	Road
Atlanta Braves	90	72	.556	—	43‍–‍38	47‍–‍34
Washington Nationals	82	80	.506	8	41‍–‍40	41‍–‍40
Philadelphia Phillies	80	82	.494	10	49‍–‍32	31‍–‍50
New York Mets	77	85	.475	13	37‍–‍44	40‍–‍41
Miami Marlins	63	98	.391	26½	38‍–‍43	25‍–‍55

Division leaders
Team	W	L	Pct.
Milwaukee Brewers	96	67	.589
Los Angeles Dodgers	92	71	.564
Atlanta Braves	90	72	.556

Wild Card teams (Top 2 teams qualify for postseason)
Team	W	L	Pct.	GB
Chicago Cubs	95	68	.583	+4
Colorado Rockies	91	72	.558	—
St. Louis Cardinals	88	74	.543	2½
Pittsburgh Pirates	82	79	.509	8
Arizona Diamondbacks	82	80	.506	8½
Washington Nationals	82	80	.506	8½
Philadelphia Phillies	80	82	.494	10½
New York Mets	77	85	.475	13½
San Francisco Giants	73	89	.451	17½
Cincinnati Reds	67	95	.414	23½
San Diego Padres	66	96	.407	24½
Miami Marlins	63	98	.391	27

=== Record vs. opponents ===
2018 National League record Source: MLB Standings Grid – 2018
Team	AZ	ATL	CHC	CIN	COL	LAD	MIA	MIL	NYM	PHI	PIT	SD	SF	STL	WSH	AL
Arizona	—	3–4	3–4	3–3	8–11	11–8	6–1	1–5	2–5	4–2	6–1	12–7	8–11	3–3	2–5	10–10
Atlanta	4–3	—	3–3	3–4	2–5	2–5	14–5	3–4	13–6	12–7	5–1	4–3	3–3	4–2	10–9	8–12
Chicago	4–3	3–3	—	11–8	3–3	4–3	5–2	11–9	6–1	4–2	10–9	5–2	3–3	9–10	4–3	13–7
Cincinnati	3–3	4–3	8–11	—	2–4	6–1	2–5	6–13	3–3	3–4	5–14	3–4	4–2	7–12	1–6	10–10
Colorado	11–8	5–2	3–3	4–2	—	7–13	2–4	2–5	6–1	5–2	3–3	11–8	12–7	2–5	5–2	13–7
Los Angeles	8–11	5–2	3–4	1–6	13–7	—	2–4	4–3	4–2	3–4	5–1	14–5	10–9	3–4	5–1	12–8
Miami	1–6	5–14	2–5	5–2	4–2	4–2	—	2–5	7–12	8–11	1–4	2–5	4–3	3–3	6–13	9–11
Milwaukee	5–1	4–3	9–11	13–6	5–2	3–4	5–2	—	4–3	3–3	7–12	4–2	6–1	11–8	4–2	13–7
New York	5–2	6–13	1–6	3–3	1–6	2–4	12–7	3–4	—	11–8	3–4	4–2	4–3	3–3	11–8	8–12
Philadelphia	2–4	7–12	2–4	4–3	2–5	4–3	11–8	3–3	8–11	—	6–1	3–3	4–3	4–3	8–11	12–8
Pittsburgh	1–6	1–5	9–10	14–5	3–3	1–5	4–1	12–7	4–3	1–6	—	3–4	4–3	8–11	2–5	15–5
San Diego	7–12	3–4	2–5	4–3	8–11	5–14	5–2	2–4	2–4	3–3	4–3	—	8–11	4–3	2–4	7–13
San Francisco	11–8	3–3	3–3	2–4	7–12	9–10	3–4	1–6	3–4	3–4	3–4	11–8	—	2–5	4–2	8–12
St. Louis	3–3	2–4	10–9	12–7	5–2	4–3	3–3	8–11	3–3	3–4	11–8	3–4	5–2	—	5–2	11–9
Washington	5–2	9–10	3–4	6–1	2–5	1–5	13–6	2–4	8–11	11–8	5–2	4–2	2–4	2–5	—	9–11

The October 1 tiebreaker games were regular-season games that are included here.

=== Game log ===
2018 game log: 63–98 (Home: 38–43; Away: 25–55)
March: 1–2 (Home: 1–2; Away: 0–0)

#	Date	Opponent	Score	Win	Loss	Save	Attendance	Record	Streak
1	March 29	Cubs	4–8	Cishek (1–0)	**Ureña** (0–1)	—	32,151	0–1	L1
2	March 30	Cubs	2–1 (17)	**Despaigne** (1–0)	Butler (0–1)	—	12,034	1–1	W1
3	March 31	Cubs	6–10 (10)	Strop (1–0)	**Ziegler** (0–1)	—	13,422	1–2	L1

April: 9–16 (Home: 5–8; Away: 4–8)

#	Date	Opponent	Score	Win	Loss	Save	Attendance	Record	Streak
4	April 1	Cubs	6–0	**Peters** (1–0)	Quintana (0–1)	—	10,428	2–2	W1
5	April 2	Red Sox	3–7	Johnson (1–0)	**Richards** (0–1)	—	11,113	2–3	L1
6	April 3	Red Sox	2–4 (13)	Hembree (1–0)	**Guerrero** (0–1)	—	14,953	2–4	L2
7	April 5	@ Phillies	0–5	Pivetta (1–0)	**Smith** (0–1)	—	44,488	2–5	L3
8	April 7	@ Phillies	1–20	Velasquez (1–1)	**Peters** (1–1)	Thompson (1)	33,660	2–6	L4
9	April 8	@ Phillies	6–3	**Despaigne** (2–0)	García (0–1)	**Ziegler** (1)	34,326	3–6	W1
10	April 9	Mets	2–4	Syndergaard (2–0)	**Ureña** (0–2)	Familia (5)	7,003	3–7	L1
11	April 10	Mets	6–8	Robles (2–0)	**Ziegler** (0–2)	Familia (6)	6,516	3–8	L2
12	April 11	Mets	1–4	Wheeler (1–0)	**O'Grady** (0–1)	—	6,150	3–9	L3
13	April 13	Pirates	7–2	**Peters** (2–1)	Kuhl (1–1)	—	6,852	4–9	W1
14	April 14	Pirates	0–1	Kontos (1–1)	**Ziegler** (0–3)	Vázquez (5)	26,816	4–10	L1
15	April 15	Pirates	3–7	Nova (2–1)	**Ureña** (0–3)	—	10,621	4–11	L2
16	April 16	@ Yankees	1–12	Severino (3–1)	**Smith** (0–2)	—	35,525	4–12	L3
17	April 17	@ Yankees	9–1	**García** (1–0)	Tanaka (2–2)	—	34,005	5–12	W1
18	April 19	@ Brewers	3–12	Anderson (2–1)	**Peters** (2–2)	—	26,087	5–13	L1
19	April 20	@ Brewers	0–8	Chacín (1–1)	**Richards** (0–2)	—	28,233	5–14	L2
20	April 21	@ Brewers	5–6	Jeffress (2–0)	**Tazawa** (0–1)	—	37,175	5–15	L3
21	April 22	@ Brewers	2–4	Guerra (2–0)	**Smith** (0–3)	Hader (3)	37,015	5–16	L4
22	April 23	@ Dodgers	1–2	Liberatore (1–0)	**Barraclough** (0–1)	Fields (1)	46,909	5–17	L5
23	April 24	@ Dodgers	3–2	**Steckenrider** (1–0)	Báez (0–1)	**Ziegler** (2)	39,284	6–17	W1
24	April 25	@ Dodgers	8–6	**González** (1–0)	Kershaw (1–4)	—	39,004	7–17	W2
25	April 27	Rockies	0–1	Senzatela (2–1)	**Ureña** (0–4)	Davis (10)	5,931	7–18	L1
26	April 28	Rockies	4–1	**Chen** (1–0)	Márquez (1–3)	**Barraclough** (1)	9,659	8–18	W1
27	April 29	Rockies	3–0	**Smith** (1–3)	Bettis (3–1)	**Ziegler** (3)	11,203	9–18	W2
28	April 30	Phillies	8–4	**González** (2–0)	Arrieta (3–1)	—	5,415	10–18	W3

May: 10–18 (Home: 5–8; Away: 5–10)

#	Date	Opponent	Score	Win	Loss	Save	Attendance	Record	Streak
29	May 1	Phillies	2–1 (10)	**Tazawa** (1–1)	Ríos (3–1)	—	5,415	11–18	W4
30	May 2	Phillies	0–6	Nola (4–1)	**Ureña** (0–5)	—	5,941	11–19	L1
31	May 4	@ Reds	1–4	Romano (2–3)	**Chen** (1–1)	Iglesias (4)	22,610	11–20	L2
32	May 5	@ Reds	6–0	**Smith** (2–3)	Mahle (2–4)	—	19,609	12–20	W1
33	May 6	@ Reds	8–5	**Wittgren** (1–0)	Finnegan (0–3)	**Ziegler** (4)	19,800	13–20	W2
34	May 7	@ Cubs	2–14	Hendricks (3–2)	García (1-1)	—	37,333	13-21	L1
35	May 8	@ Cubs	3–4	Edwards Jr (1–0)	**Barraclough** (0–2)	Morrow (8)	40,051	13-22	L2
36	May 9	@ Cubs	4–13	Quintana (4–2)	**Chen** (1–2)	—	34,486	13-23	L3
37	May 10	Braves	2–9	Foltynewicz (3–2)	**Smith** (2–4)	Gohara (1)	8,277	13-24	L4
38	May 11	Braves	6–3	**Straily** (1–0)	McCarthy (4–2)	**Ziegler** (5)	9,149	14-24	W1
39	May 12	Braves	5–10	Minter (1–0)	**Steckenrider** (1–1)	—	12,383	14–25	L1
40	May 13	Braves	3–4	Newcomb (4–1)	**Ureña** (0–6)	Vizcaíno (7)	7,435	14–26	L2
41	May 15	Dodgers	4–2	**Wittgren** (2–0)	Wood (0–4)	**Ziegler** (6)	6,242	15–26	W1
42	May 16	Dodgers	6–5	**Steckenrider** (2–1)	Báez (1–2)	**Ziegler** (7)	5,721	16–26	W2
43	May 17	Dodgers	0–7	Maeda (3–3)	**Smith** (2–5)	—	13,820	16–27	L1
44	May 18	@ Braves	2–0	**Straily** (2–0)	Wisler (1–1)	**Ziegler** (8)	27,705	17–27	W1
45	May 19	@ Braves	1–8	Newcomb (5–1)	**Ureña** (0–7)	—	37,715	17-28	L1
46	May 20	@ Braves	9–10	Minter (3–0)	**Guerrero** (0–2)	—	28,352	17–29	L2
47	May 21	@ Mets	0–2	Vargas (3–0)	**Hernández** (0–1)	Familia (13)	22,505	17–30	L3
48	May 22	@ Mets	5–1	**Smith** (3–5)	Wheeler (2–4)	—	22,195	18–30	W1
49	May 23	@ Mets	2–1	**Conley** (1–0)	Familia (2–2)	**Ziegler** (9)	24,808	19–30	W2
50	May 25	Nationals	5–9	Scherzer (8–1)	**Wittgren** (2–1)	Doolittle (10)	7,512	19–31	L1
51	May 26	Nationals	1–4	Miller (1–0)	**Ziegler** (0–4)	Doolittle (11)	11,646	19–32	L2
52	May 27	Nationals	2–5	Strasburg (6–4)	**Hernández** (0–2)	Kintzler (2)	11,641	19–33	L3
53	May 28	@ Padres	7–2	**Smith** (4–5)	Lauer (1–3)	—	27,932	20–33	W1
54	May 29	@ Padres	5–9	Stammen (3–0)	**Straily** (2–1)	—	16,321	20–34	L1
55	May 30	@ Padres	2–3	Strahm (1–2)	**Ziegler** (0–5)	—	15,733	20–35	L2
56	May 31	@ Padres	3–8	Lyles (2–1)	**Chen** (1–3)	Hand (17)	17,373	20–36	L3

June: 14–14 (Home: 7–6; Away: 7–8)

#	Date	Opponent	Score	Win	Loss	Save	Attendance	Record	Streak
57	June 1	@ Diamondbacks	1–9	Buchholz (1–1)	**Hernández** (0–3)	—	25,866	20–37	L4
58	June 2	@ Diamondbacks	2–6	Greinke (4–4)	**Smith** (4–6)	—	34,117	20–38	L5
59	June 3	@ Diamondbacks	1–6	Koch (4–3)	**Straily** (2–2)	—	31,727	20–39	L6
60	June 5	@ Cardinals	7–4	**Ureña** (1–7)	Guilmet (0–1)	**Barraclough** (2)	40,070	21–39	W1
61	June 6	@ Cardinals	11–3	**Rucinski** (1–0)	Flaherty (2–2)	—	40,109	22–39	W2
62	June 7	@ Cardinals	1–4	Mikolas (7–1)	**Richards** (0–3)	Norris (12)	41,297	22–40	L1
63	June 8	Padres	4–0	**Smith** (5–6)	Lauer (2–4)	—	10,654	23–40	W1
64	June 9	Padres	4–5	Stammen (4–0)	**Rucinski** (1–1)	Yates (2)	12,089	23–41	L1
65	June 10	Padres	1–3	Richard (5–6)	**Ureña** (1–8)	Hand (19)	12,984	23–42	L2
66	June 11	Giants	7–5	**Conley** (2–0)	Dyson (2–1)	**Barraclough** (3)	6,023	24–42	W1
67	June 12	Giants	3–1	**Richards** (1–3)	Stratton (7–4)	**Barraclough** (4)	5,928	25–42	W2
68	June 13	Giants	5–4	**Steckenrider** (3–1)	Moronta (2–1)	—	6,075	26–42	W3
69	June 14	Giants	3–6 (16)	Blach (4–5)	**Hernández** (0–4)	Dyson (1)	9,726	26–43	L1
70	June 15	@ Orioles	2–0	**Ureña** (2–8)	Gausman (3–6)	**Barraclough** (5)	23,968	27–43	W1
71	June 16	@ Orioles	5–4	**Chen** (2–3)	Cobb (2–9)	**Steckenrider** (1)	23,948	28–43	W2
72	June 17	@ Orioles	4–10	Bundy (5–7)	**Richards** (1–4)	—	21,421	28–44	L1
73	June 18	@ Giants	5–4	**Guerrero** (1–2)	Strickland (3–3)	**Barraclough** (6)	36,743	29–44	W1
74	June 19	@ Giants	3–6	Rodríguez (2–1)	**Straily** (2–3)	Dyson (2)	37,242	29–45	L1
75	June 20	@ Giants	5–6	Holland (5–7)	**Ureña** (2–9)	Moronta (1)	35,903	29–46	L2
76	June 22	@ Rockies	3–11	Gray (7–7)	**Chen** (2–4)	—	35,468	29–47	L3
77	June 23	@ Rockies	6–2	**Richards** (2–4)	Anderson (4–3)	—	39,032	30–47	W1
78	June 24	@ Rockies	8–5	**Rucinski** (2–1)	Márquez (5–8)	**Barraclough** (7)	34,172	31–47	W2
79	June 25	Diamondbacks	9–5	**Straily** (3–3)	Miller (0–1)	—	6,105	32–47	W3
80	June 26	Diamondbacks	3–5	Godley (9–5)	**Hernández** (0–5)	Boxberger (18)	6,159	32–48	L1
81	June 27	Diamondbacks	1–2	Ray (3–0)	**Chen** (2–5)	Boxberger (19)	6,382	32–49	L2
82	June 28	Diamondbacks	0–4	Greinke (8–5)	**Richards** (2–5)	—	12,715	32–50	L3
83	June 29	Mets	8–2	**Alcantara** (1–0)	Oswalt (0–1)	—	8,211	33–50	W1
84	June 30	Mets	5–2	**Lopez** (1–0)	deGrom (5–4)	**Barraclough** (8)	10,523	34–50	W2

July: 12–13 (Home: 9–7; Away: 3–6)

#	Date	Opponent	Score	Win	Loss	Save	Attendance	Record	Streak
85	July 1	Mets	2–5	Matz (4–5)	**Straily** (3–4)	Familia (15)	9,611	34–51	L1
86	July 2	Rays	3–2 (10)	**Rucinski** (3–1)	Stanek (1–2)	—	6,004	35–51	W1
87	July 3	Rays	6–9 (16)	Nuño (3–0)	**Graves** (0–1)	Alvarado (3)	6,259	35–52	L1
88	July 4	Rays	3–0	**Rucinski** (4–1)	Weber (0–1)	**Ziegler** (10)	7,572	36–52	W1
89	July 5	@ Nationals	12–14	Kelley (1–0)	**Conley** (2–1)	Doolittle (22)	24,314	36–53	L1
90	July 6	@ Nationals	2–3	Doolittle (3–2)	**Barraclough** (0–3)	—	32,652	36–54	L2
91	July 7	@ Nationals	4–18	Scherzer (11–5)	**Chen** (2–6)	—	34,364	36–55	L3
92	July 8	@ Nationals	10–2	**Conley** (3–1)	Roark (3–11)	—	30,464	37–55	W1
93	July 9	Brewers	4–3 (10)	**Ziegler** (1–5)	Knebel (2–1)	—	5,996	38–55	W2
94	July 10	Brewers	4–8	Chacín (8–3)	**López** (1–1)	Burnes (1)	5,624	38–56	L1
95	July 11	Brewers	5–4 (12)	**Hernández** (1–5)	López	—	5,265	39–56	W1
96	July 13	Phillies	0–2	Arrieta (7–6)	**Chen** (2–7)	Neshek (1)	8,090	39–57	L1
97	July 14	Phillies	2–0	**Richards** (3–5)	Nola (12–3)	**Barraclough** (9)	14,793	40–57	W1
98	July 15	Phillies	10–5	**Hernández** (2–5)	Ramos (3–1)	—	8,829	41–57	W2
ASG	**89th All-Star Game** at Nationals Park in Washington, District of Columbia, United States								Box
ASG	July 17	NL All-Stars 6, **AL All-Stars** 8 (10)		Díaz (SEA)	Stripling (LAD)	Happ (TOR)	43,843	AL; 44–43–2	Box
ASG	Representing the Marlins: J. T. Realmuto								Box
99	July 20	@ Rays	6–5	**Straily** (4–4)	Castillo (1–1)	**Conley** (1)	13,248	42–57	W3
100	July 21	@ Rays	3–2	**López** (2–1)	Yarbrough (8–5)	**Barraclough** (10)	13,808	43–57	W4
101	July 22	@ Rays	4–6	Kolarek (1–0)	**Barraclough** (0–4)	—	11,828	43–58	L1
102	July 23	Braves	1–12	Newcomb (9–5)	**Ureña** (2–10)	—	8.259	43–59	L2
103	July 24	Braves	9–3	**Chen** (3–7)	Teherán (7–7)	—	21,673	44–59	W1
104	July 26	Nationals	3–10	Miller (6–1)	**Conley** (3–2)	—	8,506	44–60	L1
105	July 27	Nationals	1–9	Scherzer (14–5)	**López** (2–2)	—	9,297	44–61	L2
106	July 28	Nationals	2–1 (10)	**Graves** (1–1)	Herrera (2–2)	—	11,779	45–61	W1
107	July 29	Nationals	5–0	**Ureña** (3–10)	Hellickson (4–2)	—	12,112	46–61	W2
108	July 30	@ Braves	3–5	Teherán (8–7)	**Chen** (3–8)	Minter (6)	21,230	46–62	L1
109	July 31	@ Braves	6–11	Allard (1–0)	**Straily** (4–5)	—	18,627	46–63	L2

August: 7–19 (Home: 5–8; Away: 2–11)

#	Date	Opponent	Score	Win	Loss	Save	Attendance	Record	Streak
–	August 1	@ Braves	Postponed (rain): Rescheduled for August 13 as part of a doubleheader.						
110	August 2	@ Phillies	2–5	Hunter (3–1)	**Barraclough** (0–5)	—	26,050	46–64	L3
111	August 3	@ Phillies	1–5	Velasquez (8–8)	**Richards** (3–6)	Domínguez (12)	33,737	46–65	L4
112	August 4	@ Phillies	3–8	Eflin (8–3)	**Ureña** (3–11)	—	35,194	46–66	L5
113	August 5	@ Phillies	3–5	Neshek (1–0)	**Steckenrider** (3–2)	Hunter (2)	42,343	46–67	L6
114	August 6	Cardinals	3–2	**Chen** (4–8)	Weaver (6–10)	**Guerra** (1)	8,563	47-67	W1
115	August 7	Cardinals	2-3	Mikolas (12–3)	**Hernández** (2–6)	Norris (22)	7,230	47–68	L1
116	August 8	Cardinals	1–7	Gant (4-4)	**Richards** (3–7)	—	7,306	47–69	L2
117	August 10	Mets	2–6	Wheeler (7–6)	**Ureña** (3–12)	—	6,993	47–70	L3
118	August 11	Mets	4–3 (11)	**Guerra** (1–0)	Rhame (0–2)	—	11,478	48–70	W1
119	August 12	Mets	3–4	Syndergaard (8–2)	**Chen** (4–9)	Lugo (1)	8,964	48–71	L1
120	August 13 (1)	@ Braves	1–9	Toussaint (1–0)	**López** (2–3)	—	16,049	48–72	L2
121	August 13 (2)	@ Braves	1–6	Foltynewicz (10–7)	**González** (2–1)	—	18,186	48–73	L3
122	August 14	@ Braves	6–10	Biddle (4–1)	**Conley** (3–3)	—	19,409	48–74	L4
123	August 15	@ Braves	2–5	Gausman (7–9)	**García** (1–2)	Minter (11)	19,045	48–75	L5
124	August 17	@ Nationals	2–8	Scherzer (16–5)	**Straily** (4–6)	—	37,106	48–76	L6
125	August 18	@ Nationals	7–5 (10)	**Steckenrider** (4–2)	Glover (0–2)	**Graves** (1)	30,900	49–76	W1
126	August 19	@ Nationals	12–1	**Ureña** (4–12)	González (7–10)	—	31,435	50–76	W2
127	August 21	Yankees	1–2 (12)	Cole (4–1)	**Guerra** (1–1)	Kahnle (1)	26,275	50–77	L1
128	August 22	Yankees	9–3	**García** (2–2)	Lynn (8–9)	—	25,547	51–77	W1
129	August 23	Braves	0-5	Newcomb (11–6)	**Hernandez** (2–7)	—	6,587	51–78	L1
130	August 24	Braves	1-0	**Straily** (5–6)	Foltynewicz (10–8)	**Conley** (2)	7,792	52–78	W1
131	August 25	Braves	3-1	**Chen** (5–9)	Sánchez (6–5)	**Steckenrider** (2)	7,823	53–78	W2
132	August 26	Braves	0-4	Gausman (9-9)	**López** (2–4)	—	12,770	53–79	L1
133	August 28	@ Red Sox	7–8	Kimbrel (4–1)	**Steckenrider** (4–3)	—	36,708	53–80	L2
134	August 29	@ Red Sox	6–14	Thornburg (2–0)	**Conley** (3–4)	—	36,628	53–81	L3
135	August 31	Blue Jays	5–6	Biagini (3–7)	**Steckenrider** (4–4)	Giles (19)	8,871	53–82	L4

September: 10–16 (Home: 7–4; Away: 3–12)

#	Date	Opponent	Score	Win	Loss	Save	Attendance	Record	Streak
136	September 1	Blue Jays	6–3	**Chen** (6–9)	Estrada (7–11)	—	11,174	54–82	W1
137	September 2	Blue Jays	1–6	Reid-Foley (1–2)	**Brigham** (0–1)	—	9,617	54–83	L1
138	September 3	Phillies	3–1	**Ureña** (5–12)	Velasquez (9–10)	**Steckenrider** (3)	7,771	55–83	W1
139	September 4	Phillies	4–9	Arrieta (10–9)	**Richards** (3–8)	—	7,131	55–84	L1
140	September 5	Phillies	2–1	**Alcántara** (2–0)	Pivetta (7–11)	**Steckenrider** (4)	6,427	56–84	W1
141	September 7	@ Pirates	3–5	Rodríguez (4–2)	**Guerrero** (1–3)	Vázquez (31)	19,515	56–85	L1
142	September 8	@ Pirates	1–5	Nova (8–9)	**Chen** (6–10)	—	16,110	56–86	L2
—	September 9	@ Pirates	Cancelled (rain; will not be made up)						
—	September 10	@ Mets	Postponed (rain): Rescheduled for September 12 as part of a doubleheader.						
143	September 11	@ Mets	5–3	**Ureña** (6–12)	deGrom (8–9)	—	20,849	57–86	W1
144	September 12 (1)	@ Mets	0–13	Wheeler (11–7)	**Richards** (3–9)	—	20,423	57–87	L1
—	September 12 (2)	@ Mets	Postponed (rain): Rescheduled for September 13 as part of a doubleheader.						
145	September 13 (1)	@ Mets	3–4	Blevins (3–2)	**Barraclough** (0–6)	—	22,640	57–88	L2
146	September 13 (2)	@ Mets	2–5	Vargas (6–9)	**Brigham** (0–2)	Gsellman (11)	22,640	57–89	L3
147	September 14	@ Phillies	2–14	Eflin (10–7)	**Chen** (6–11)	—	21,671	57–90	L4
148	September 15	@ Phillies	4–5	García (3–1)	**Rucinski** (4–2)	Neshek (5)	24,695	57–91	L5
149	September 16	@ Phillies	6–4	**Ureña** (7–12)	Pivetta (7–13)	—	30,040	58–91	W1
150	September 17	Nationals	8–5	**García** (3–2)	Glover (1–3)	**Conley** (3)	8,440	59–91	W2
151	September 18	Nationals	2–4	Strasburg (9–7)	**Alcántara** (2–1)	Doolittle (25)	7,726	59–92	L1
152	September 20	Reds	2–4	Reed (1–2)	**Brigham** (0–3)	Iglesias (29)	9,863	59–93	L2
153	September 21	Reds	1–0 (10)	**Barraclough** (1–6)	Hernandez (5–2)	—	11,471	60–93	W1
154	September 22	Reds	5–1	**Ureña** (8–12)	DeSclafani (7–7)	**Steckenrider** (5)	12,559	61–93	W2
155	September 23	Reds	6–0	**Richards** (4–9)	Lorenzen (3–2)	—	13,595	62–93	W3
156	September 24	@ Nationals	3–7	Miller (7–1)	**Alcántara** (2–2)	—	22,428	62–94	L1
157	September 25	@ Nationals	4–9	Scherzer (18–7)	**Brigham** (0–4)	—	26,483	62–95	L2
158	September 26	@ Nationals	3–9 (7)	**Suero** (4–1)	Chen (6–12)	—	28,680	62–96	L3
159	September 28	@ Mets	8–1	**Ureña** (9–12)	Sewald (0–7)	—	27,045	63–96	W1
160	September 29	@ Mets	0–1 (13)	Zamora (1–0)	**García** (3–3)	—	43,928	63–97	L1
161	September 30	@ Mets	0–1	Syndergaard (13–4)	**Alcántara** (2–3)	—	28,346	63–98	L2

Legend: = Win = Loss = Postponement
Bold = Marlins team member

== Roster ==
2018 Miami Marlins
Roster
Pitchers: 22 Sandy Alcántara; 46 Kyle Barraclough; 43 Jeff Brigham; 54 Wei-Yin Chen; 67 Tyler Cloyd; 61 Adam Conley; 43 Odrisamer Despaigne; 66 Jarlin García; 77 Merandy González; 53 Brett Graves; 40 Javy Guerra; 56 Tayron Guerrero; 57 Elieser Hernández; 39 Tyler Kinley; 49 Pablo López; 51 Ben Meyer; 50 Chris O'Grady; 76 Dillon Peters; 63 Trevor Richards; 55 Drew Rucinski; 31 Caleb Smith; 71 Drew Steckenrider; 58 Dan Straily; 25 Junichi Tazawa; 44 Jacob Turner; 62 José Ureña; 64 Nick Wittgren; 29 Brad Ziegler	Catchers: 28 Bryan Holaday; 11 J. T. Realmuto; 18 Tomás Telis; 17 Chad Wallach; Infielders: 48 Christopher Bostick; 41 Justin Bour; 13 Starlin Castro; 45 Peter O'Brien; 14 Martín Prado; 10 J. T. Riddle; 2 Yadiel Rivera; 19 Miguel Rojas	Outfielders: 15 Brian Anderson; 9 Lewis Brinson; 30 Garrett Cooper; 32 Derek Dietrich; 44 Austin Dean; 79 Isaac Galloway; 12 Braxton Lee; 1 Cameron Maybin; 52 Rafael Ortega; 3 J. B. Shuck; 34 Magneuris Sierra	Manager: 8 Don Mattingly; Coaches: 85 Rob Flippo (bullpen catcher); 33 Fredi González (third base); 7 Perry Hill (first base); 59 Ed Lucas (administrative coach); 4 Frank Menechino (assistant hitting); 47 Juan Nieves (pitching); 6 Mike Pagliarulo (hitting); 23 Brian Schneider (catching); 24 Dean Treanor (bullpen); 38 Tim Wallach (bench)

== Player stats ==
=== Batting ===
Note: G = Games played; AB = At bats; R = Runs; H = Hits; 2B = Doubles; 3B = Triples; HR = Home runs; RBI = Runs batted in; SB = Stolen bases; BB = Walks; AVG = Batting average; SLG = Slugging average

Player	G	AB	R	H	2B	3B	HR	RBI	SB	BB	AVG	SLG
Starlin Castro	154	593	76	165	32	2	12	54	6	48	.278	.400
Brian Anderson	156	590	87	161	34	4	11	65	2	62	.273	.400
Derek Dietrich	149	499	72	132	26	2	16	45	2	29	.265	.421
Miguel Rojas	153	488	44	123	13	0	11	53	6	24	.252	.346
J. T. Realmuto	125	477	74	132	30	3	21	74	3	38	.277	.484
Lewis Brinson	109	382	31	76	10	5	11	42	2	17	.199	.338
Justin Bour	112	374	43	85	10	1	19	54	1	69	.227	.412
J. T. Riddle	102	308	28	71	10	4	9	36	0	20	.231	.377
Cameron Maybin	99	251	20	63	12	1	3	20	8	32	.251	.343
Martín Prado	54	197	16	48	9	0	1	18	1	11	.244	.305
Bryan Holaday	61	151	7	31	5	0	1	16	0	10	.205	.258
Magneuris Sierra	54	147	10	28	3	0	0	7	3	6	.190	.211
Yadiel Rivera	111	139	13	24	3	0	1	9	2	19	.173	.216
Rafael Ortega	41	133	10	31	3	1	0	7	5	10	.233	.271
JB Shuck	70	130	10	25	3	1	0	4	2	10	.192	.231
Austin Dean	34	113	16	25	4	0	4	14	1	7	.221	.363
Peter O'Brien	22	66	8	18	5	0	4	10	0	7	.273	.530
Isaac Galloway	43	64	7	13	3	0	3	7	1	9	.203	.391
Chad Wallach	15	45	4	8	1	0	1	5	0	4	.178	.267
Garrett Cooper	14	33	2	7	1	0	0	2	0	4	.212	.242
Tomás Telis	23	29	2	6	1	0	0	1	0	2	.207	.241
Braxton Lee	8	17	0	3	0	0	0	2	0	1	.176	.176
Christopher Bostick	13	14	0	3	1	0	0	2	0	2	.214	.286
Pitcher totals	161	248	9	25	3	0	0	7	0	14	.101	.113
Team totals	161	5488	589	1303	222	24	128	554	45	455	.237	.357

=== Pitching ===
Note: W = Wins; L = Losses; ERA = Earned run average; G = Games pitched; GS = Games started; SV = Saves; IP = Innings pitched; H = Hits allowed; R = Runs allowed; ER = Earned runs allowed; BB = Walks allowed; SO = Strikeouts

Player	W	L	ERA	G	GS	SV	IP	H	R	ER	BB	SO
José Ureña	9	12	3.98	31	31	0	174.0	155	78	77	51	130
Wei-Yin Chen	6	12	4.79	26	26	0	133.1	131	75	71	47	111
Trevor Richards	4	9	4.42	25	25	0	126.1	121	65	62	54	130
Dan Straily	5	6	4.12	23	23	0	122.1	107	62	56	52	99
Caleb Smith	5	6	4.19	16	16	0	77.1	63	36	36	33	88
Jarlín García	3	3	4.91	29	7	0	66.0	59	37	36	28	40
Elieser Hernández	2	7	5.21	32	6	0	65.2	68	38	38	27	45
Drew Steckenrider	4	4	3.90	71	0	5	64.2	55	29	28	27	74
Pablo López	2	4	4.14	10	10	0	58.2	56	28	27	18	46
Tayron Guerrero	1	3	5.43	60	0	0	58.0	64	40	35	30	68
Kyle Barraclough	1	6	4.20	61	0	10	55.2	40	27	26	34	60
Brad Ziegler	1	5	3.98	53	0	10	52.0	49	25	23	17	37
Adam Conley	3	4	4.09	52	0	3	50.2	37	25	23	18	50
Javy Guerra	1	1	5.55	32	0	1	35.2	42	27	22	12	30
Drew Rucinski	4	2	4.33	32	0	0	35.1	34	21	17	13	27
Sandy Alcántara	2	3	3.44	6	6	0	34.0	25	13	13	23	30
Nick Wittgren	2	1	2.94	32	0	0	33.2	29	13	11	15	31
Brett Graves	1	1	5.40	21	0	1	33.1	41	22	20	12	21
Dillon Peters	2	2	7.16	7	5	0	27.2	34	22	22	15	17
Merandy González	2	1	5.73	8	1	0	22.0	31	14	14	8	19
Odrisamer Despaigne	2	0	5.31	11	1	0	20.1	22	16	12	8	18
Junichi Tazawa	1	1	9.00	22	0	0	20.0	28	21	20	13	24
Ben Meyer	0	0	10.42	13	0	0	19.0	26	23	22	14	9
Tyler Cloyd	0	0	8.66	7	0	0	17.2	25	17	17	10	13
Jeff Brigham	0	4	6.06	4	4	0	16.1	16	11	11	13	12
Tyler Kinley	0	0	7.04	9	0	0	7.2	6	6	6	4	9
Chris O'Grady	0	1	6.43	8	0	0	7.0	7	5	5	4	8
Jacob Turner	0	0	15.88	4	0	0	5.2	13	10	10	5	2
Bryan Holaday	0	0	13.50	2	0	0	2.0	4	3	3	0	1
Team totals	63	98	4.76	161	161	30	1442.0	1388	809	762	605	1249

== Farm system ==
Level	Team	League	Manager
AAA	New Orleans Baby Cakes	Pacific Coast League	
AA	Jacksonville Jumbo Shrimp	Southern League	
A-Advanced	Jupiter Hammerheads	Florida State League	
A	Greensboro Grasshoppers	South Atlantic League	
A-Short Season	Batavia Muckdogs	New York–Penn League	
Rookie	GCL Marlins	Gulf Coast League	
Rookie	DSL Marlins	Dominican Summer League	
