= Stephen Tarpley =

American baseball player (born 1993)

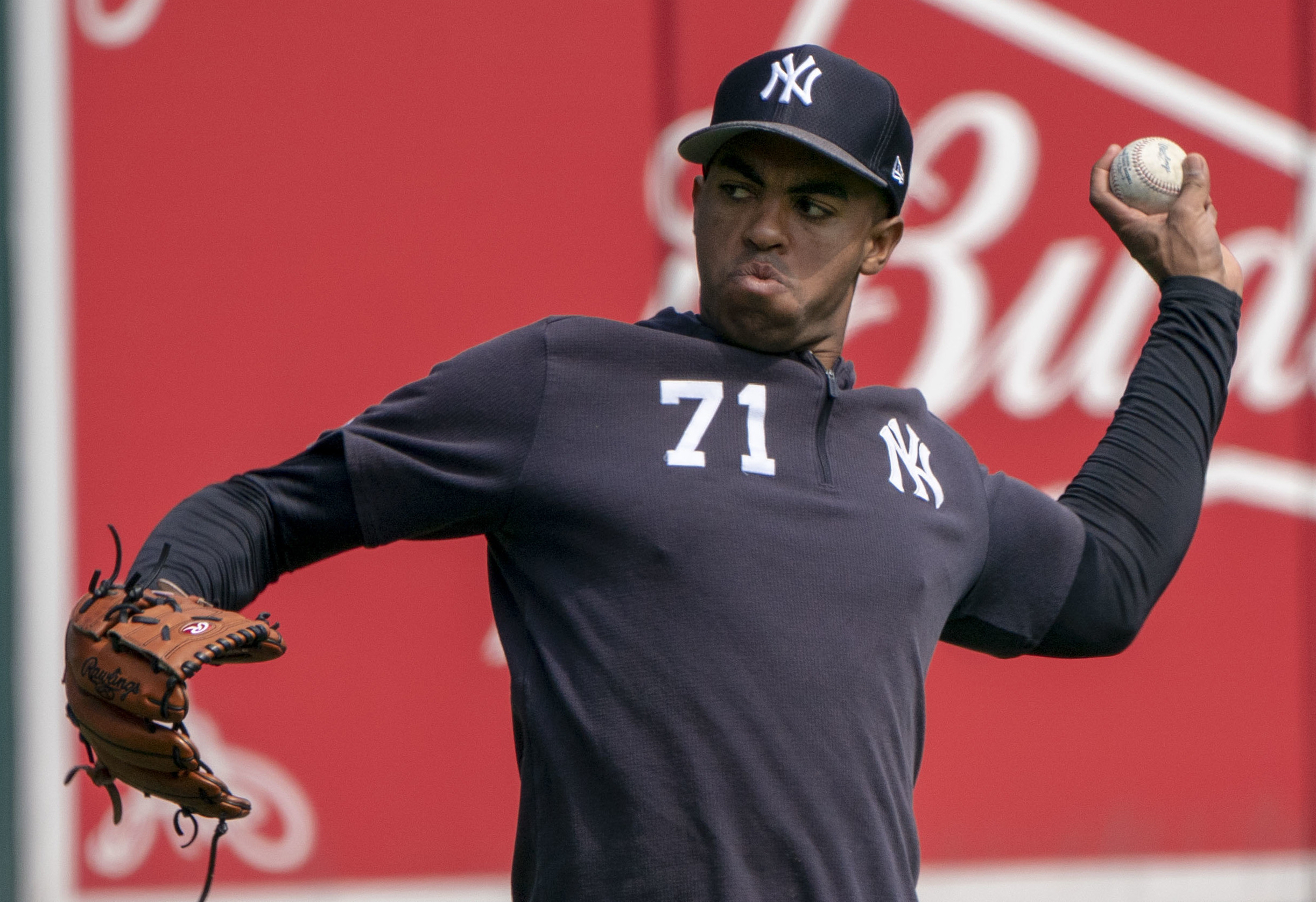
- Tarpley with the New York Yankees in 2019

Leones de Yucatán
- Pitcher
- Born: February 17, 1993 (age 33); Los Angeles, California, U.S.
- Bats: Right Throws: Left

MLB debut
- September 2, 2018, for the New York Yankees

MLB statistics (through 2021 season)
- Win–loss record: 3–2
- Earned run average: 7.05
- Strikeouts: 58
- Stats at Baseball Reference

Teams
- New York Yankees (2018–2019); Miami Marlins (2020); New York Mets (2021)

Stephen Nicholas Tarpley (born February 17, 1993) is an American professional baseball pitcher for the Leones de Yucatán of the Mexican League. He has previously played in Major League Baseball (MLB) for the New York Yankees, Miami Marlins, and New York Mets.

== Career ==
=== Amateur career ===
Tarpley attended Gilbert High School in Gilbert, Arizona. The Cleveland Indians selected him in the eighth round of the 2011 Major League Baseball draft. He did not sign with the Indians and enrolled at the University of Southern California (USC) to play college baseball for the Trojans. After one year at USC, he transferred to Scottsdale Community College. In 2013, his sophomore and lone year at Scottsdale, he went 3–2 with a 2.35 ERA in 16 games (15 starts).

=== Baltimore Orioles ===
The Baltimore Orioles selected Tarpley in the third round of the 2013 Major League Baseball draft. He signed with the Orioles, receiving a $525,000 signing bonus, and spent 2013 with the Gulf Coast League Orioles where he went 0–1 with a 2.14 ERA in seven starts. He spent 2014 with the Aberdeen IronBirds and compiled a 3–5 record and 3.66 ERA in 13 games (12 starts)

=== Pittsburgh Pirates ===
On January 27, 2015, the Orioles traded Tarpley along with a player to be named later to the Pittsburgh Pirates in exchange for Travis Snider. Pittsburgh assigned him to the West Virginia Power of the Single–A South Atlantic League and he spent the whole season there, pitching to an 11–4 record, 2.48 ERA, and 1.15 WHIP in 20 starts. He began 2016 with the Bradenton Marauders of the High–A Florida State League (FSL) and posted a 6–4 record and 4.32 ERA in 20 games started.

=== New York Yankees ===
On August 30, 2016, the Pirates traded Tarpley and Tito Polo to the New York Yankees as the players to be named later in the August 1 trade for Iván Nova. New York assigned him to the High–A Tampa Yankees of the FSL, and he pitched in one game for them, giving up five runs in five innings. He spent 2017 with both Tampa and the Trenton Thunder of the Double–A Eastern League, going a combined 7–0 with an 0.88 ERA and 0.88 WHIP in 18 total relief appearances between the two clubs.

In 2018, Tarpley pitched for Trenton and Scranton/Wilkes-Barre RailRiders of the Triple–A International League. The Yankees promoted him to the major leagues on September 1, and he made his major league debut the next day. Tarpley pitched in 10 regular season games for the Yankees during his September call up and impressed the Yankees enough to be placed on their post-season roster. During the playoffs he pitched one inning in game three of the 2018 American League Division Series against the Red Sox.

On June 9, 2019, Tarpley recorded his first career save in an extra-innings win against the Cleveland Indians. Tarpley logged a 6.93 ERA in 21 appearances on the year.

On January 11, 2020, Tarpley was designated for assignment by the Yankees following the re–signing of Brett Gardner.

=== Miami Marlins ===
On January 15, 2020, Tarpley was traded to the Miami Marlins in exchange for James Nelson. On August 5, 2020, Tarpley earned his first Marlins save. In 12 games with Miami, Tarpley recorded a 2–2 record 9.00 ERA. On January 3, 2021, the Marlins designated Tarpley for assignment.

=== New York Mets ===
On January 8, 2021, Tarpley was claimed off waivers by the New York Mets. Tarpley struggled to a 15.58 ERA in 9 appearances for the Triple-A Syracuse Mets, and allowed 1 run in his only appearance with the Mets without recording an out. He was designated for assignment on July 11. Tarpley was released by the Mets on July 16.

=== Long Island Ducks ===
On April 22, 2022, Tarpley signed with the Long Island Ducks of the Atlantic League of Professional Baseball. On July 9, Tarpley’s contract was purchased by the San Francisco Giants organization and he was assigned to the Double-A Richmond Flying Squirrels. However, Tarpley did not appear in a game for the Giants organization and re-signed with the Ducks on July 14. He appeared in 20 games, making 16 starts and going 4-7 with a 4.64 ERA and 92 strikeouts in 85 1/3 innings pitched.

On April 18, 2023, Tarpley re-signed with the Ducks for the 2023 season. In 14 starts, he registered a 4–5 record and 4.90 ERA with 70 strikeouts in 71 2/3 innings pitched.

=== Lexington Counter Clocks ===
On July 28, 2023, Tarpley was traded to the Lexington Counter Clocks in exchange for Merandy González. In one start for the Counter Clocks, he allowed seven runs on eight hits with five strikeouts. On February 27, 2024, Tarpley was released by Lexington.

=== Sultanes de Monterrey ===
On March 1, 2024, Tarpley signed with the Sultanes de Monterrey of the Mexican League. In 17 starts for Monterrey, he compiled a 7–3 record and 4.11 ERA with 75 strikeouts across 81 innings pitched.

Tarpley made 17 appearances (including 16 starts) for the team in 2025, posting a 4–4 record with a 5.74 ERA and 66 strikeouts in 78 1/3 innings pitched. He logged 16 starts for Monterrey in 2026, compiling a 3–6 record with a 5.21 ERA and 49 strikeouts across 67 1/3 innings pitched.

=== Leones de Yucatán ===
On August 4, 2026, Tarpley was traded to the Leones de Yucatán of the Mexican League in exchange for Miguel Castro.
