= Tyron Guerrero =

Colombian baseball player (born 1991)

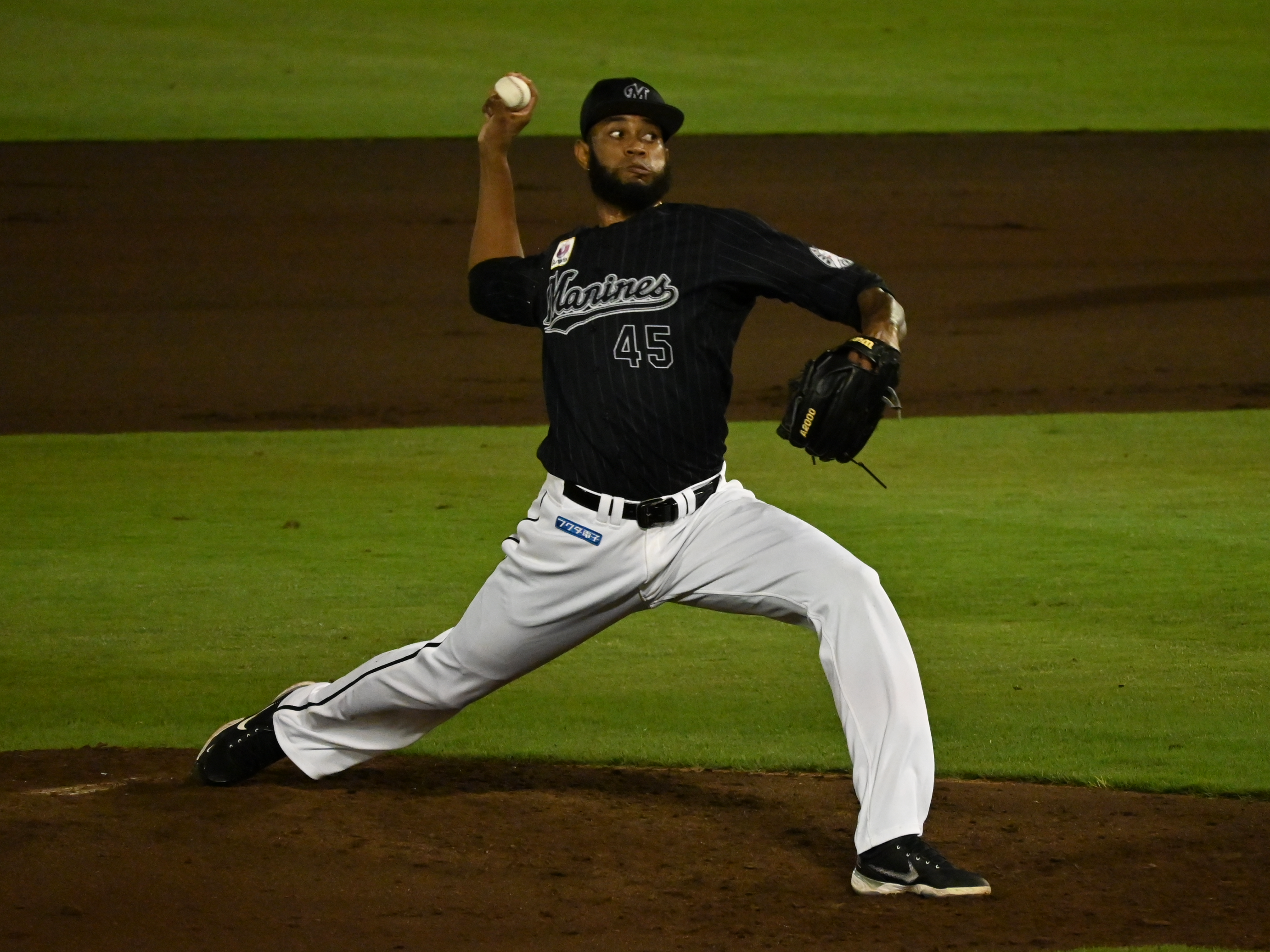
- Guerrero with the Chiba Lotte Marines in 2022

Boston Red Sox – No. 41
- Pitcher
- Born: January 9, 1991 (age 35); Bocachica, Tierra Bomba Island, Bolívar, Colombia
- Bats: Right Throws: Right

Professional debut
- MLB: May 17, 2016, for the San Diego Padres
- NPB: March 25, 2022, for the Chiba Lotte Marines

MLB statistics (through 2026 season)
- Win–loss record: 3–7
- Earned run average: 5.03
- Strikeouts: 152

NPB statistics (through 2025 season)
- Win–loss record: 4–6
- Earned run average: 4.39
- Strikeouts: 78
- Stats at Baseball Reference

Teams
- San Diego Padres (2016); Miami Marlins (2018–2019); Chiba Lotte Marines (2022, 2025); Boston Red Sox (2026–present)

Tyron Luis Guerrero (Note: Previously known as Tayron Guerrero) (born January 9, 1991) is a Colombian professional baseball pitcher for the Boston Red Sox of Major League Baseball (MLB). He has previously played in MLB for the San Diego Padres and Miami Marlins, and in Nippon Professional Baseball (NPB) for the Chiba Lotte Marines. Guerrero has also played for the Colombian national baseball team at the World Baseball Classic.

== Career ==
=== San Diego Padres ===
The Padres signed Guerrero as an amateur free agent in 2009. In 2014, Guerrero started the season with the Fort Wayne TinCaps of the Single–A Midwest League before receiving a promotion to the Lake Elsinore Storm of the High–A California League. Guerrero played in the 2014 All-Star Futures Game for the World Team, recording a strikeout of Peter O'Brien. After the season, the Padres assigned Guerrero to the Arizona Fall League to continue his development. He was added to the 40-man roster on November 20, 2014.

Guerrero was called up to the major leagues on May 15, 2016, and made his major league debut on May 17.

=== Miami Marlins ===
On July 29, 2016, the Padres traded Guerrero, Andrew Cashner, Colin Rea, and cash considerations to the Miami Marlins in exchange for Josh Naylor, Jarred Cosart, Carter Capps, and Luis Castillo. After the trade, he pitched for the Jacksonville Jumbo Shrimp of the Double–A Southern League, for whom he had a 0–1 win–loss record with a 3.38 earned run average (ERA), and 22 strikeouts in 16 innings pitched. Guerrero competed for the Colombian national baseball team in the 2017 World Baseball Classic. In 2018 with Miami he was 1–3 with a 5.43 ERA, and 68 strikeouts in 58 innings, averaging 10.6 strikeouts per 9 innings. His fastest pitch of 2018 was 104.0 miles an hour, third-best in MLB only to pitches by Jordan Hicks and Aroldis Chapman.

Guerrero made 52 appearances for the Marlins in 2019, compiling a 1-2 record and 6.26 ERA with 43 strikeouts over 46 innings of work. Guerrero was designated for assignment on December 2, 2019.

=== Chicago White Sox ===
On December 6, 2019, Guerrero was claimed off waivers by the Chicago White Sox from the Marlins. Guerrero was designated for assignment on January 2, 2020, following the promotion of Luis Robert. Guerrero did not play in a game in 2020 due to the cancellation of the minor league season because of the COVID-19 pandemic. Guerrero appeared in 18 games for the Triple-A Charlotte Knights in 2021, but struggled to a 6.63 ERA before being released on July 31, 2021.

=== Chiba Lotte Marines ===
On December 18, 2021, Guerrero signed with the Chiba Lotte Marines of Nippon Professional Baseball. In 2022, Guerrero appeared in 49 games for Lotte, recording a 3-3 record and 3.52 ERA with 63 strikeouts in 46 innings pitched.

=== Cincinnati Reds ===
On January 7, 2023, Guerrero signed a minor league contract with the Cincinnati Reds organization. In 20 appearances for the Triple–A Louisville Bats, he struggled immensely to an 0–4 record and 11.51 ERA with 20 strikeouts in 22 2/3 innings of work. Guerrero was released by the Reds on June 16.

=== Diablos Rojos del México ===
On July 8, 2023, Guerrero signed with the Diablos Rojos del México of the Mexican League. In eight games for México, he recorded a 1.17 ERA with eight strikeouts and six saves across 7 2/3 innings pitched.

=== Los Angeles Angels ===
On December 18, 2023, Guerrero signed a minor league contract with the Los Angeles Angels. He made 33 appearances split between the rookie–level Arizona Complex League Angels and Triple–A Salt Lake Bees, posting a cumulative 3–3 record and 5.70 ERA with 38 strikeouts across 36 1/3 innings pitched. Guerrero elected free agency following the season on November 4, 2024.

=== Chiba Lotte Marines (second stint) ===
On December 3, 2024, Guerrero signed a one–year, $600,000 contract with the Chiba Lotte Marines of Nippon Professional Baseball. He made 21 appearances for the Marines in 2025, compiling a 1-3 record and 6.41 ERA with 15 strikeouts and one save across 19 2/3 innings pitched. Guerrero became a free agent following the season.

=== Boston Red Sox ===
On January 9, 2026, Guerrero signed a minor league contract with the Boston Red Sox. He made 15 appearances for the Triple-A Worcester Red Sox, recording an 0.92 ERA with 22 strikeouts and three saves across 19 2/3 innings pitched. On May 22, the Red Sox selected Guerrero's contract, adding him to their active roster.

== Personal life ==
Guerrero's name was inaccurately listed as "Tayron" for much of his career due to a clerical error.
