= Merandy González =

Dominican baseball player (born 1995)

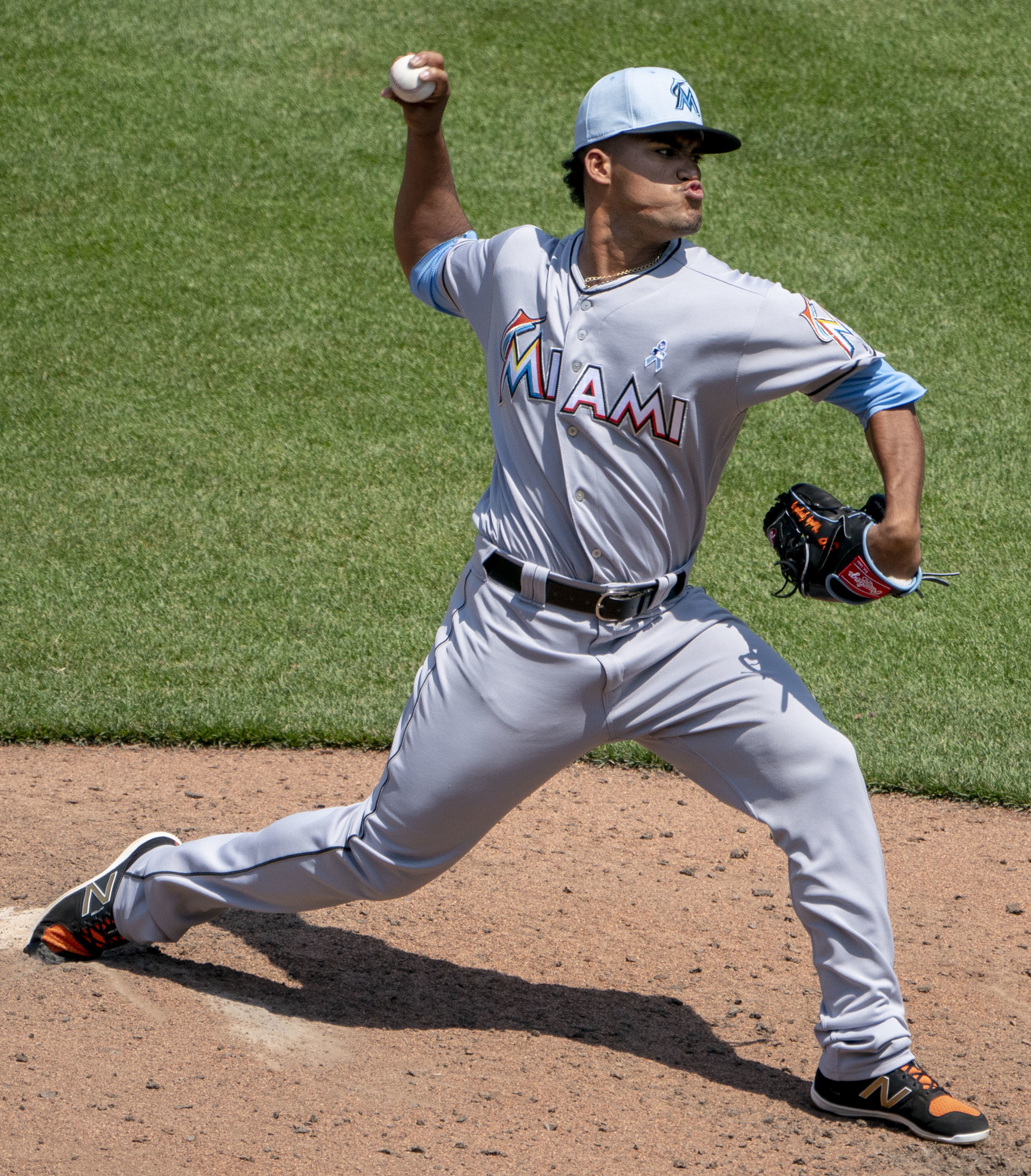
- González with the Miami Marlins
- Pitcher
- Born: October 9, 1995 (age 30); Cotui, Dominican Republic
- Batted: Right Threw: Right

MLB debut
- April 19, 2018, for the Miami Marlins

Last MLB appearance
- August 13, 2018, for the Miami Marlins

MLB statistics
- Win–loss record: 2–1
- Earned run average: 5.73
- Strikeouts: 19
- Stats at Baseball Reference

Teams
- Miami Marlins (2018)

Merandy González (born October 9, 1995) is a Dominican former professional baseball pitcher. He has previously played in Major League Baseball (MLB) for the Miami Marlins.

== Career ==
=== New York Mets ===
González was signed by the New York Mets as an international free agent on March 6, 2013. He made his professional debut that season with the DSL Mets and spent the whole season there, going 4–1 with a 2.82 ERA in 44.2 innings pitched. He returned to the DSL in 2014 and pitched to a 3–4 record and 3.51 ERA in 14 games (13 starts). In 2015, he pitched for the GCL Mets and Kingsport Mets where he compiled a 4–3 record and 2.57 ERA in 66.2 innings pitched, and in 2016 he played with the Brooklyn Cyclones where he posted a 6–3 record, 2.87 ERA, and 1.33 WHIP in 14 starts. He began 2017 with the Columbia Fireflies and was promoted to the St. Lucie Mets in June.

=== Miami Marlins ===
On July 28, 2017, he was traded by the Mets along with Ricardo Cespedes for A. J. Ramos. Miami assigned him to the Jupiter Hammerheads and he finished the season there. In 22 games (20 starts) between Columbia, St. Lucie, and Jupiter, he was 13–3 with a 1.66 ERA, 0.97 WHIP, and a .212 batting average against. On November 20, 2017, the Marlins added him to their 40-man roster to protect him from the Rule 5 draft. He began 2018 with the Jacksonville Jumbo Shrimp.

González made his Major League debut on April 19, 2018. In doing so, he became the first Columbia Fireflies played to reach the major leagues. He spent the majority of the year with Triple-A Jacksonville, posting a 3–6 record and 4.32 ERA across 14 starts. In 8 appearances for the Marlins during his rookie campaign, González registered a 5.73 ERA with 19 strikeouts in 22.0 innings pitched.

=== St. Louis Cardinals ===
On March 2, 2019, González was claimed off waivers by the San Francisco Giants. He was optioned to the Triple-A Sacramento River Cats to begin the year, but was designated for assignment on March 25 following the waiver claim of Tom Murphy.

On March 28, González was claimed off waivers by the St. Louis Cardinals and optioned to the Double-A Springfield Cardinals. He pitched to a 6.75 ERA, 2.17 WHIP and 21:19 K:BB in 24 innings for Springfield before he was designated for assignment on June 8 following the promotion of Tommy Edman. González finished the year making 39 appearances for Springfield, but struggled to a 6.64 ERA with 39 strikeouts in 40 2/3 innings pitched. He elected free agency following the season on November 4.

=== Washington Nationals ===
On January 7, 2020, González signed a minor league contract with the Washington Nationals. He was assigned to the Double-A Harrisburg Senators, but did not play in a game due to the cancellation of the minor league season because of the COVID-19 pandemic. González was released by the Nationals organization on May 29.

=== Tigres de Quintana Roo ===
On July 20, 2021, González signed with the Tigres de Quintana Roo of the Mexican League. He was released on August 5, after tossing 3 scoreless innings in 4 appearances for the team.

=== York Revolution ===
On March 1, 2022, González signed with the York Revolution of the Atlantic League of Professional Baseball. González struggled in 5 starts for York, recording a 1–4 record and 7.71 ERA with 18 strikeouts in 23 1/3 innings of work. He was released by the team on June 6.

=== Lexington Counter Clocks ===
On May 25, 2023, González signed with the Lexington Counter Clocks of the Atlantic League of Professional Baseball. In 12 games (11 starts) for Lexington, he registered a 3–2 record and 4.31 ERA with 46 strikeouts in 56 1/3 innings pitched.

=== Long Island Ducks ===
On July 28, 2023, González was traded to the Long Island Ducks in exchange for Stephen Tarpley. In 2 starts for Long Island, he allowed a staggering 13 runs (12 earned) on 14 hits and 9 walks with 14 strikeouts in 8 2/3 innings of work. On September 2, González was released by Long Island.
