= Isaac Galloway =

American baseball player (born 1989)

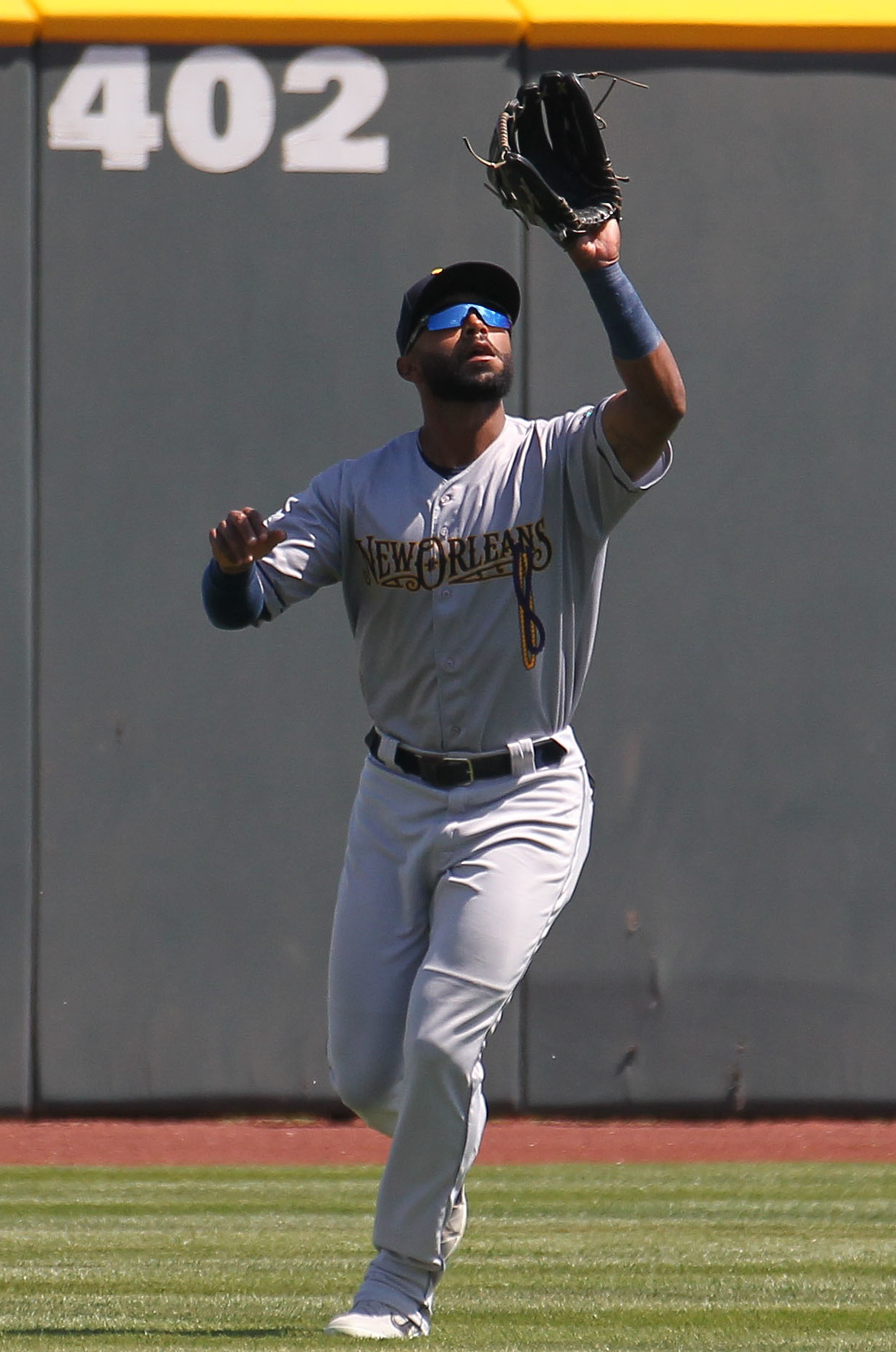
- Galloway with the New Orleans Baby Cakes at Werner Park in 2019
- Outfielder
- Born: October 10, 1989 (age 36); Pomona Valley, California, U.S.
- Batted: Right Threw: Right

MLB debut
- July 31, 2018, for the Miami Marlins

Last MLB appearance
- May 10, 2019, for the Miami Marlins

MLB statistics
- Batting average: .186
- Home runs: 3
- Runs batted in: 8
- Stats at Baseball Reference

Teams
- Miami Marlins (2018–2019)

Isaac Galloway IV (born October 10, 1989) is an American former professional baseball outfielder. He played in Major League Baseball (MLB) for the Miami Marlins.

== Career ==
Galloway attended Los Osos High School in Rancho Cucamonga, California, where he was teammates on the school's baseball team with Addison Reed. Galloway initially committed to play college baseball at San Diego State, but signed with the Florida Marlins after being taken in the 8th round of the 2008 MLB draft.

He logged 3,655 plate appearances, 947 games, and 11 seasons in the minors. He was called up to the majors for the first time on July 31, 2018. Galloway had the most minor league service time of any player to make his Major League debut with the Marlins since Brian Daubach's debut 20 years earlier.

On February 4, 2019, Galloway was designated for assignment following the waiver claim of Austin Brice and outrighted on February 10. He was assigned to Triple-A to start the 2019 season. On April 16, his contract was purchased and he was recalled to the major league roster. Galloway elected free agency on October 1, 2019.
