= Iván Nova =

Dominican baseball player (born 1987)

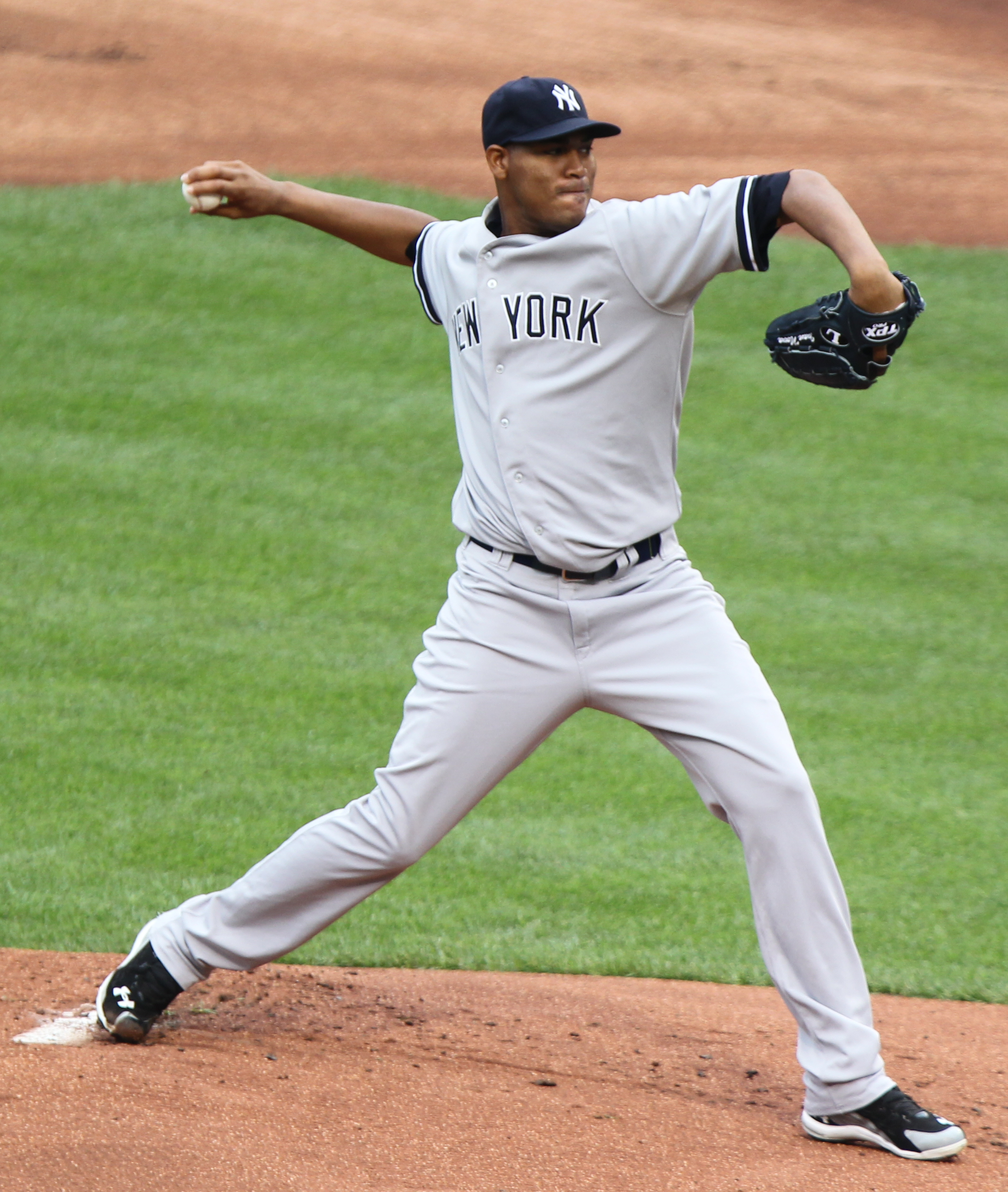
- Nova with the New York Yankees in 2011
- Pitcher
- Born: January 12, 1987 (age 39); San Cristóbal, Dominican Republic
- Batted: Right Threw: Right

Professional debut
- MLB: May 13, 2010, for the New York Yankees
- KBO: April 5, 2022, for the SSG Landers

Last appearance
- MLB: August 14, 2020, for the Detroit Tigers
- KBO: June 15, 2022, for the SSG Landers

MLB statistics
- Win–loss record: 90–77
- Earned run average: 4.38
- Strikeouts: 963

KBO statistics
- Win–loss record: 3-4
- Earned run average: 6.50
- Strikeouts: 32
- Stats at Baseball Reference

Teams
- New York Yankees (2010–2016); Pittsburgh Pirates (2016–2018); Chicago White Sox (2019); Detroit Tigers (2020); SSG Landers (2022)

Iván Manuel Nova Guance (born January 12, 1987) is a Dominican former professional baseball pitcher. He played in Major League Baseball (MLB) for the New York Yankees, Pittsburgh Pirates, Chicago White Sox, and Detroit Tigers. He also played in the KBO League for the SSG Landers.

Nova grew up poor in the Dominican Republic, where he started playing baseball at a young age. An unheralded prospect, Nova signed as an international free agent with the Yankees in 2004. After pitching in minor league baseball through the 2008 season, the San Diego Padres selected Nova from the Yankees in the Rule 5 draft. The Padres opted not to carry Nova on their 25-man roster, however, and returned him to the Yankees.

Nova enjoyed a breakout season in the minors for the Yankees in 2009. He made his MLB debut with the Yankees in 2010, and established himself as a key member of the Yankees' starting rotation during the 2011 season. After struggling in 2012, Nova reemerged in 2013, winning the American League Pitcher of the Month Award for August 2013. The Yankees traded Nova to the Pirates in 2016, and he won the National League Pitcher of the Month Award for April 2017. After the 2018 season, the Pirates traded Nova to the White Sox.

== Early life ==
Nova was raised in San Cristóbal, Dominican Republic. His father, Manuel, managed a restaurant on the beach. To make ends meet, Nova and his four siblings slept in the same bed and often worked in their father's restaurant.

"I really didn't want to sign with Boston. My father and I were both Yankee fans."

— Iván Nova

Nova rooted for the New York Yankees of Major League Baseball and the Leones del Escogido of the Dominican Professional Baseball League as a child. He played baseball as a shortstop and outfielder, but was not highly regarded as a prospect. He went unnoticed by scouts until he experienced a growth spurt at the age of 15. Local scouts asked Nova to pitch in a game against older players, and he continued to train as a pitcher.

The Boston Red Sox invited Nova to their Dominican academy, where they attempted to sign him. Nova declined their contract offer, however, as the Red Sox are rivals of the Yankees. When he was 17 years old, a trainer recommended Nova to Victor Mata, a Yankees scout, who invited Nova to attend their Dominican academy.

== Career ==
=== New York Yankees ===
After a two-week tryout, the Yankees signed Nova as an international free agent on July 15, 2004. Nova received an $80,000 signing bonus, about the average bonus given to a Dominican prospect. Though other teams would have offered Nova more money, he insisted on signing with the Yankees.

Nova made his professional debut with the Gulf Coast League Yankees in the Rookie-level Gulf Coast League in 2006, where he accumulated a 3–0 win–loss record with a 2.72 earned run average (ERA). After starting the 2007 season in extended spring training, the Yankees assigned him to the Charleston RiverDogs of the Single-A South Atlantic League.

In 2008, Nova pitched for the Tampa Yankees of the High-A Florida State League. Nova started the season with an 0–5 win–loss record and a 5.06 ERA, at which point he considered quitting baseball. But Nova persevered, and he rebounded to finish the season with an 8–13 win–loss record and a 4.36 ERA in 26 games, 24 of which he started. He recorded 109 strikeouts and 46 walks.

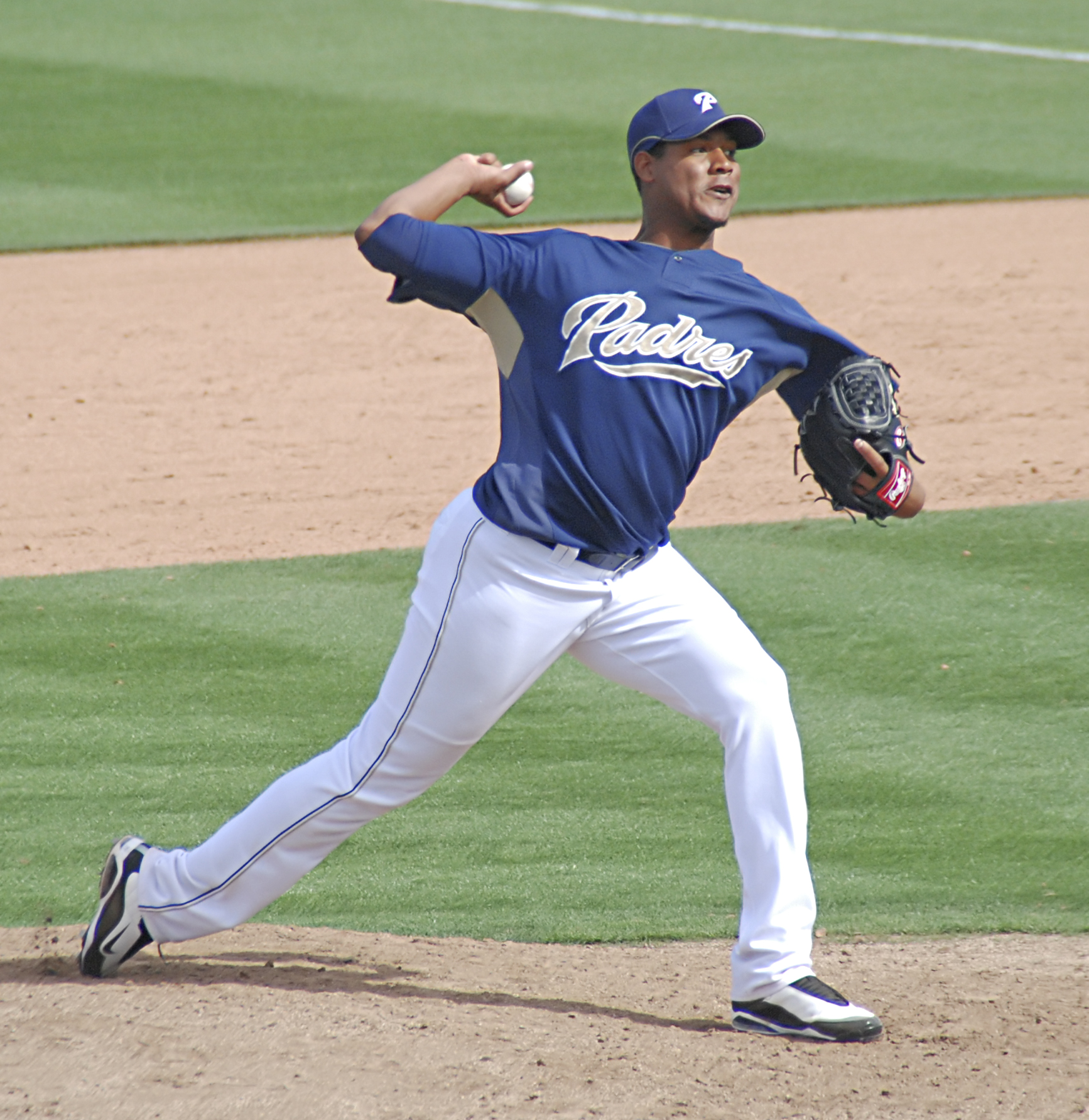
Nova with the San Diego Padres during spring training in 2009

The Yankees opted not to add Nova to their 40-man roster after the 2008 season, exposing him to the Rule 5 draft that off-season. They calculated that Nova, if selected, would be returned to the organization by the end of spring training, as he was unlikely to last the entire season on a team's 25-man roster, as required by the Rule 5 process. In December 2008, the San Diego Padres selected Nova with the twentieth selection in the Rule 5 draft. Competing for a spot on the Padres' roster, Nova had an 8.31 ERA in spring training, allowing eight earned runs and 13 hits in 8 2/3 innings pitched, while walking four and striking out three. He was returned to the Yankees after clearing outright waivers at the end of spring training.

Nova began the 2009 season with the Trenton Thunder of the Double-A Eastern League. He started the season with a 2.36 ERA in 12 games started. His performance led the Yankees to promote him to the Scranton/Wilkes-Barre Yankees of the Triple-A International League, where he made his first start on June 29, pitching 5 2/3 innings of no-hit baseball against the Rochester Red Wings. Combined, Nova finished with a 6–8 win–loss record and a 3.68 ERA during the regular season, and had a 1–0 record and a 1.93 ERA in two postseason starts with Scranton/Wilkes-Barre. Following the 2009 season, the Yankees added Nova to their 40-man roster, to ensure he was not selected in the Rule 5 draft again.

==== 2010–2011 ====
After recording a 2.43 ERA and 1.27 walks plus hits per inning pitched (WHIP) ratio over his first six starts for Scranton/Wilkes Barre, Nova was promoted to the major leagues on May 10, 2010, to serve as a long reliever in the Yankees' bullpen. He pitched three shutout innings in relief before he was optioned back to Scranton/Wilkes-Barre. Nova was recalled to the majors on August 21, and he made his first career major league start on August 23. He impressed the Yankees in his first start, going 5 1/3 innings and allowing two runs on six hits against the Toronto Blue Jays. He was given his second start, replacing Javier Vázquez in the Yankees' starting rotation. Nova struck out seven Chicago White Sox in his first MLB victory on August 29.

At the time of his MLB debut, the league investigated Nova and fellow Yankees pitching prospect Wilkins de la Rosa for injecting each other with Vitamin B12. Overall, Nova made seven starts for the Yankees in 2010, pitching to a 1–2 record and a 4.50 ERA. Nova reached the sixth inning only once, however, as he allowed a higher opponents' batting average and ERA in the fifth inning than in the first four. The Yankees did not include Nova on their postseason roster.

Nova entered spring training in 2011 expected to secure a spot in the starting rotation. Nova was named to the Yankees' starting rotation. On June 20, Nova had the longest start in his career to that point, allowing one run in eight innings against the Cincinnati Reds, while striking out seven. Through June, Nova had an 8–4 win–loss record and 4.15 ERA, including a 4–1 record and 3.35 ERA in his six most recent starts.

Despite Nova's success, he was demoted to Scranton/Wilkes-Barre due to the return of Bartolo Colón and Phil Hughes from the disabled list, as Nova had minor league options remaining. Nova used the time with Scranton/Wilkes-Barre to work on his slider.

Nova was called up to the majors due to a double-header against the Baltimore Orioles on July 30. Nova solidified himself in the Yankees rotation after a 7 2/3 inning, six hit, one run, ten strikeout, zero walk performance against the Chicago White Sox. He remained in the rotation when manager Joe Girardi decided to use six starters, instead of the usual five, in order to keep starting Nova. After his July 30 promotion, Nova had an 8–0 record with a 3.18 ERA. The Yankees selected Nova for their three-man postseason starting rotation at the end of the season. Girardi named Nova the starter in Game 2 of the 2011 American League Division Series (ALDS). When Game 1 was postponed by rain in the third inning, he pitched 6 2/3 innings of the resumed game, while allowing only two runs and earning the win. He pitched again for the Yankees in Game 5 but the team lost the series.

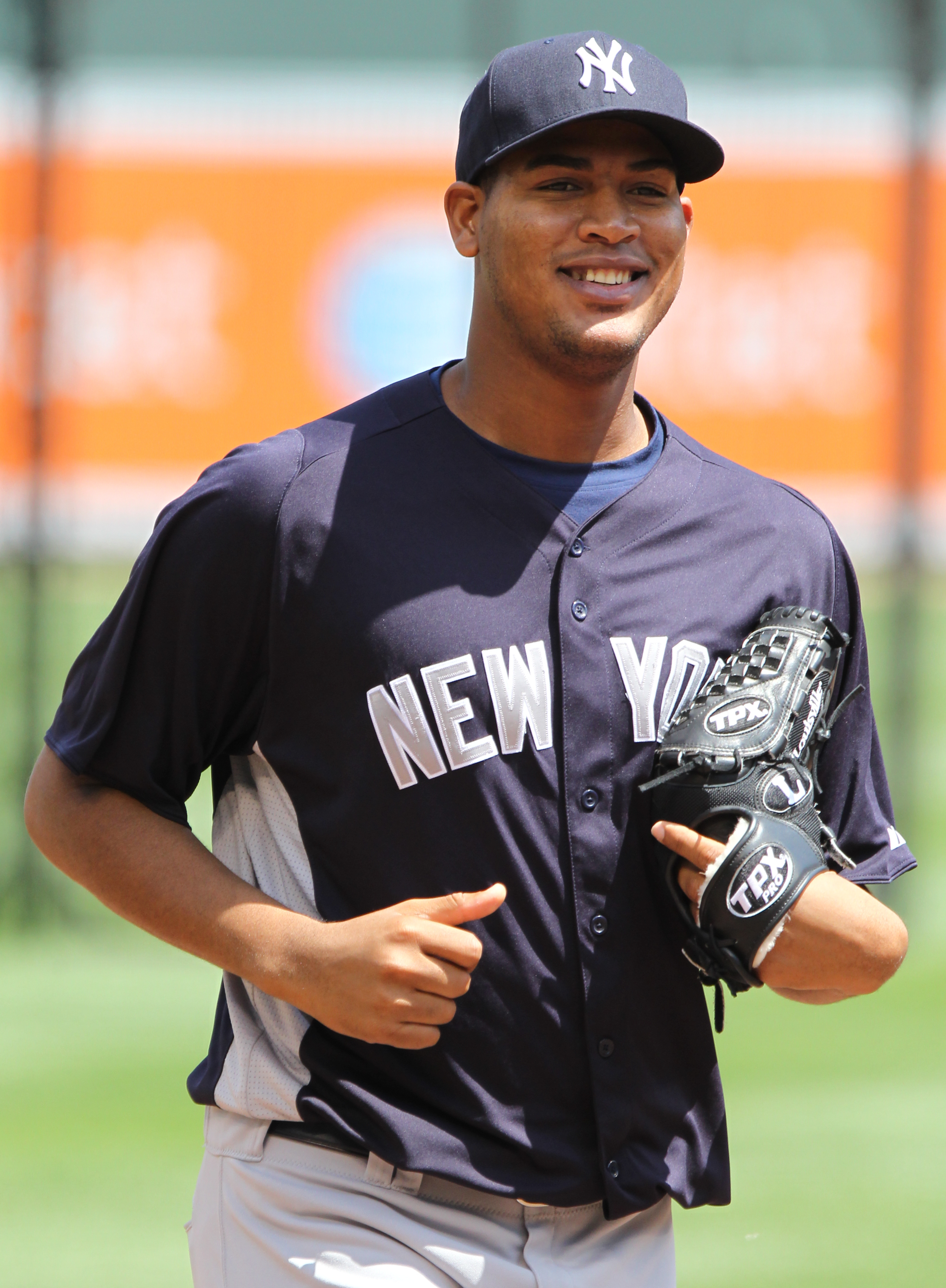
Nova in pre-game warmups in April 2011

Nova compiled a 16–4 record in 2011, the most wins for a Yankees rookie since Stan Bahnsen won 17 games in 1968. He also had a 3.70 ERA. He was named to the Baseball America All-Rookie Team following the season. Nova finished fourth in balloting for the American League (AL) Rookie of the Year Award, finishing behind Jeremy Hellickson, Mark Trumbo, and Eric Hosmer.

==== 2012–2016 ====
Nova secured for a spot in the starting rotation for the 2012 season in spring training. He won 15 consecutive games from June 2011 through May 2012, one short of the franchise record set by Roger Clemens. He surpassed the Yankees' rookie record of twelve consecutive wins, set by Atley Donald in 1939, during the 2011 season.

Nova struggled at the beginning of the 2012 season, recording a 5.60 ERA through May, but decreased it to 3.92 by the All-Star break. During an interleague game against the Atlanta Braves on June 11, 2012, Nova got his first career base hit off of Randall Delgado in a 3–0 win. Nova was not very effective after the All-Star break, pitching to a 2–5 record with a 6.40 ERA in 10 starts, and was placed on the 15-day disabled list due to rotator cuff inflammation. Due to his struggles late in the season, the Yankees decided to demote Nova to the bullpen for the postseason roster until the team lost in the 2012 ALCS to the Detroit Tigers. Despite his 5.02 ERA, he still finished the 2012 season with a record of 12–8 in 28 starts.

Nova struggled in his first four starts of the 2013 season, in which he failed to pitch past the fifth inning, pitching to a 1–1 record and a 6.28 ERA. On April 27, 2013, Nova was placed on the 15-day disabled list after an MRI revealed he had inflammation of his right triceps. Nova was activated on May 24, 2013, and demoted to the bullpen. He pitched an immaculate inning on May 29, 2013, against the New York Mets. However, he was demoted to Scranton/Wilkes-Barre the next day, as the Yankees decided they wanted Nova to continue to start.

The Yankees recalled Nova on June 23. On July 5, he pitched his first career complete game in a 3–2 win against the Orioles. Again facing the Orioles, Nova pitched his first career shutout on August 31. Nova was named the AL Pitcher of the Month for August 2013, in which he recorded a 4–0 record and a 2.08 ERA. From July 5 through August 31, Nova made seven consecutive starts in which he pitched at least seven innings and allowed three or fewer runs. Nova compiled a 7–5 record and a 2.70 ERA in 17 games, 16 of them starts, after being recalled from the minor leagues. His final 2013 record was 9–6 with a 3.10 ERA in 23 games pitched, 20 of them starts.

Eligible for salary arbitration, Nova and the Yankees agreed on a $3.3 million salary for the 2014 season. He was removed from his April 19 start with an elbow injury, which was diagnosed as a partially torn ulnar collateral ligament and required Tommy John surgery, ending Nova's season. He had a 2–2 record and an 8.47 ERA in four starts before the surgery.

Nova began a throwing program to rehabilitate his arm in September, and spent the winter at the Yankees' spring training facility in Tampa, Florida, rather than returning to the Dominican Republic. The Yankees signed Nova to a $3.3 million contract for the 2015 season, avoiding arbitration. On April 11, 2015, the Yankees placed Nova on the 60-day disabled list to begin the season recovering from his Tommy John surgery. He made his first rehabilitation start on June 8, and returned to the Yankees on June 24. Nova pitched to a 5.11 ERA in 14 starts before the Yankees took him out of the starting rotation on September 16; however, Nova returned to the rotation due to an injury to Masahiro Tanaka. He finished the 2015 season with a 6–11 record and a 5.07 ERA.

In his final year of arbitration, Nova signed a contract worth $4.1 million for the 2016 season. Nova began the 2016 season as a relief pitcher before making his first start on May 9. Nova split time between the bullpen and the rotation, posting an ERA of 4.90 in 21 games, 15 starts for the Yankees through the end of July. He tied for the major league lead in bunt hits allowed, with eight.

=== Pittsburgh Pirates ===
On August 1, 2016, the Yankees traded Nova to the Pittsburgh Pirates for two players to be named later. On August 30, the players were identified as Stephen Tarpley and Tito Polo. Nova made 11 starts for the Pirates, and pitched to a 3.06 ERA with 52 strikeouts and three walks in 64 2/3 innings pitched. He also pitched three complete games.

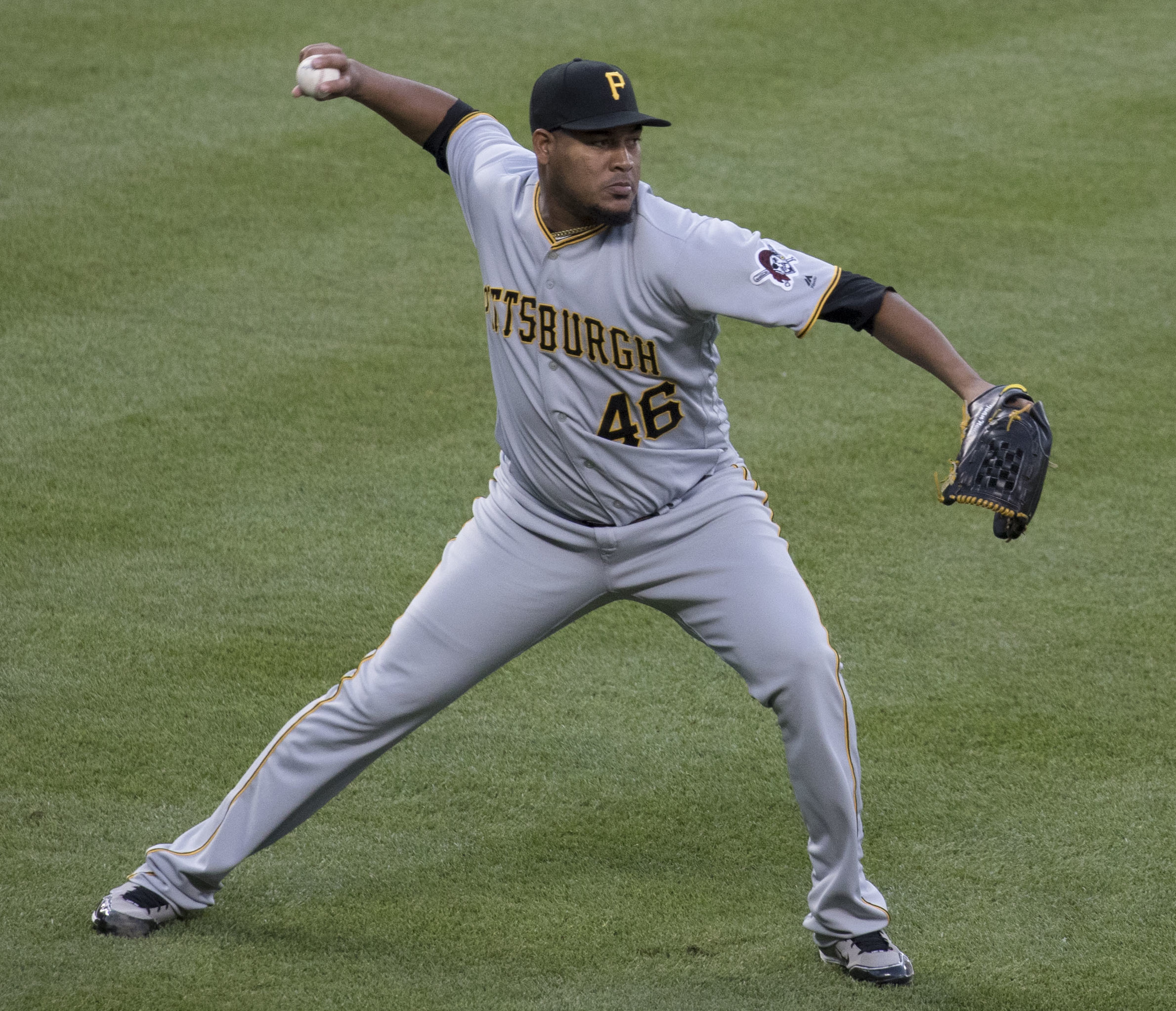
Nova with the Pirates in 2017

On December 27, 2016, Nova officially signed a three-year, $26 million contract with the Pirates. Nova won the National League's Pitcher of the Month Award for April 2017, after he led the league with an 0.75 WHIP, was second with 36 innings pitched and a 1.50 ERA, and threw two complete games (one shutout). After throwing six shutout innings against the Miami Marlins on June 11, Nova became the first Pirate to throw at least six innings in his first thirteen starts to begin a season since Eddie Solomon in 1981, who did it seventeen times. Nova's streak ended at fifteen starts, after pitching five innings of two run ball in a 6–2 win over the Rays in his sixteenth start of the year. At the All-Star break, Nova had a 3.21 ERA in 120 2/3 innings across 18 games started. He struggled in the second half of the season, including a three inning outing on August 30, which led the Pirates to skip Nova's next start. He ended the season with a 4.14 ERA in 187 innings pitched.

Nova started for the Pirates on Opening Day in 2018. He finished the season with a 9–9 record, a 4.19 ERA, 114 strikeouts and 35 walks in 161 innings pitched. He had the lowest fielding percentage among major league pitchers, at .792, and the most errors, with five.

=== Chicago White Sox ===
On December 11, 2018, the Pirates traded Nova to the Chicago White Sox for Yordi Rosario and $500,000 of international signing bonus money. In 2019, Nova posted a 11–12 record with a 4.72 ERA and led the American League with 225 hits allowed. Batters hit .300 against him, the highest batting average in the major leagues.

=== Detroit Tigers ===
On January 13, 2020, the Detroit Tigers signed Nova to a one-year, $1.5 million contract. With the 2020 Detroit Tigers, Nova appeared in four games, compiling a 1–1 record with 8.53 ERA and nine strikeouts in 19 innings pitched.

On January 26, 2021, Nova signed a minor league contract with the Philadelphia Phillies. On March 25, 2021, Nova requested and was granted his release by the Phillies once it became clear he would not make the major league team.

=== Colorado Rockies ===
On April 12, 2021, Nova signed a minor league contract with the Colorado Rockies organization. On April 29, Nova was released by the Rockies organization.

=== SSG Landers ===
On December 21, 2021, Nova signed a one-year, $1 million deal with the SSG Landers of the KBO League. He was released on July 13, 2022.

== Scouting report ==
"To me, baseball wasn't about being a prospect. What could I do when people doubted me? All I could do is not think about those things and forget about the world. Whether you're a prospect or not, it's difficult to get to the majors. I could only do my work. Think of all those prospects who are in the minors now. But they don't always get the chance. Sometimes, there simply isn't any room for them. It doesn't matter whether people used that word 'prospect' for you, I never worried about it. If I did my job, and there was room on the roster, I would get my call-up."

— Iván Nova

Nova throws four pitches: a four-seam fastball between 91 and 95 miles per hour (146–153 km/h) (tops out at 97 mph), a circle changeup between 85 and 88 miles per hour (137–142 km/h), a slider/cut fastball between 85 and 89 miles per hour (137–143 km/h), and a 12–6 curveball between 79 and 82 miles per hour (127–132 km/h). He relies heavily on his four-seamer against hitters from both sides of the plate. A high percentage (20–25%) of his pitches are curveballs, especially when facing left-handers.

Nova worked in 2011 to develop his slider, changing his grip at the suggestion of Yankees executive Billy Connors. The work paid off, as his slider garnered a whiff rate of 43% in 2011. Nova's changeup is not his main weapon and is not used against right-handed hitters.

== Personal life ==
Nova's family resides in the Dominican Republic. His father traveled to the United States to watch his second MLB start in person. Nova dedicated his 2011 season to his grandfather, who died in 2010.

== See also ==
- List of Major League Baseball players from the Dominican Republic
- Rule 5 draft results

Awards and achievements
Preceded by Jon Lester	National League; Pitcher of the Month; April 2017	Succeeded by Alex Wood
