= Kyle Barraclough =

American baseball player (born 1990)

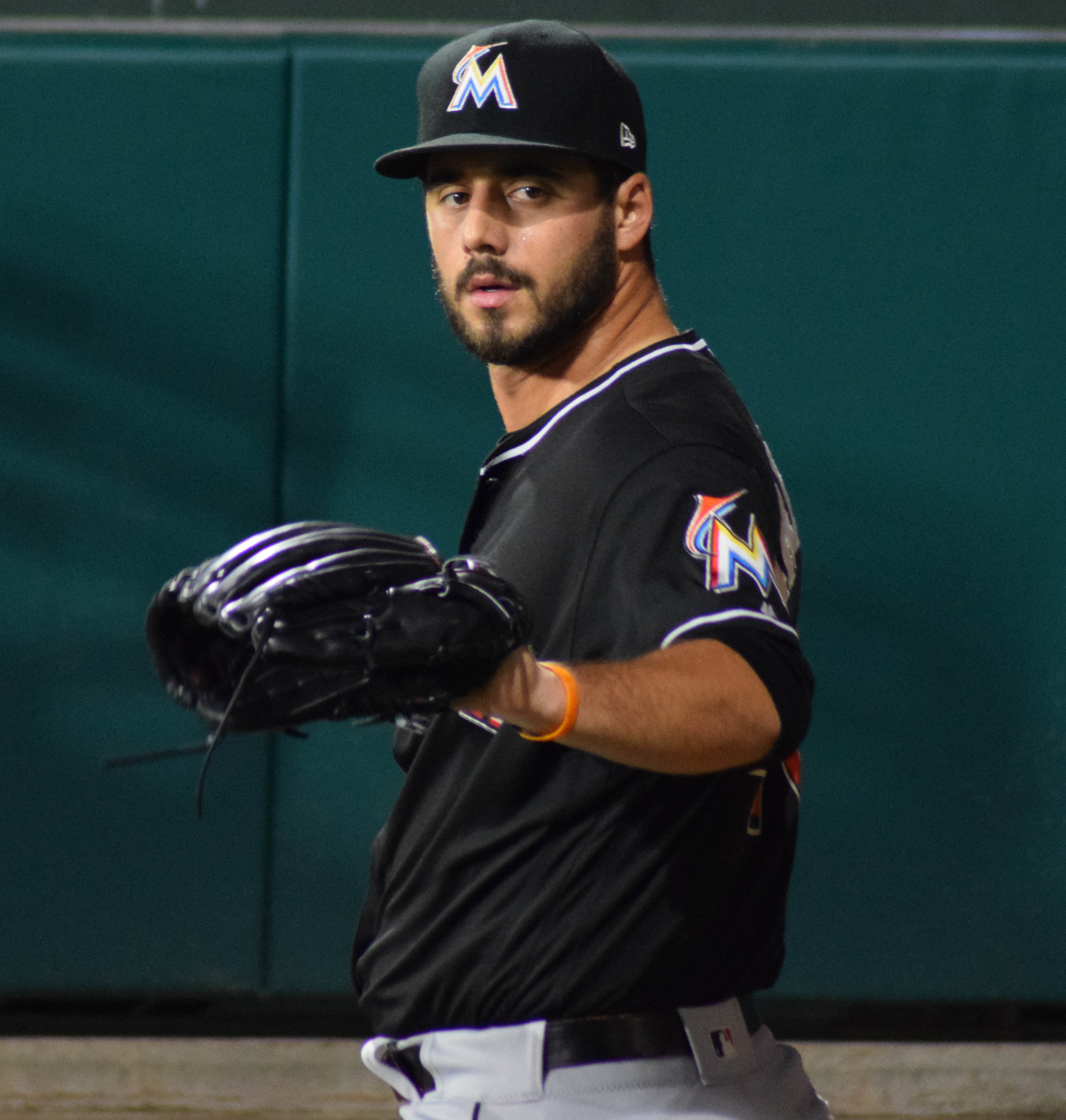
- Barraclough with the Miami Marlins in 2018

Free agent
- Pitcher
- Born: May 23, 1990 (age 36); Santa Clara, California, U.S.
- Bats: Right Throws: Right

MLB debut
- August 7, 2015, for the Miami Marlins

MLB statistics (through 2023 season)
- Win–loss record: 19–16
- Earned run average: 3.86
- Strikeouts: 350
- Stats at Baseball Reference

Teams
- Miami Marlins (2015–2018); Washington Nationals (2019); San Francisco Giants (2019); Minnesota Twins (2021); Los Angeles Angels (2022); Boston Red Sox (2023)

Kyle David Barraclough (bear-claw born May 23, 1990) is an American professional baseball pitcher who is a free agent. He has previously played in Major League Baseball (MLB) for the Miami Marlins, Washington Nationals, San Francisco Giants, Minnesota Twins, Los Angeles Angels, and Boston Red Sox.

== Career ==
After graduating from Wilcox High School in Santa Clara, California, Barraclough played college baseball at St. Mary's College of California. In 2011, his junior year, he had a 6–5 win–loss record with a 3.60 earned run average (ERA) in 15 games (14 starts). After the season, he was drafted by the Minnesota Twins in the 40th round of the 2011 MLB draft, but did not sign. As a senior in 2012, he pitched to a 2–9 record with a 3.95 ERA in 84 innings.

=== St. Louis Cardinals ===
Barraclough was drafted by the St. Louis Cardinals in the seventh round, 240th overall, of the 2012 Major League Baseball draft. He signed with the Cardinals and made his professional debut with the Low-A Batavia Muckdogs. In 15 games between Batavia and the Single-A Quad Cities River Bandits, Barraclough posted a 3.06 ERA with 33 strikeouts. In 2013, he played for the rookie-level Gulf Coast League Cardinals, struggling to a 13.50 ERA in 3 appearances and missing most of the season due to injury.

Barraclough split the 2014 season between the Single-A Peoria Chiefs and the High-A Palm Beach Cardinals, pitching to a cumulative 2–2 record and 2.45 ERA in 48 appearances between the two teams. In 2015, after logging a stellar 0.60 ERA in 11 games for Palm Beach, Barraclough received a promotion to the Double-A Springfield Cardinals, where he was named a Texas League All-Star after recording a 3.28 ERA with 28 strikeouts in 24 2/3 innings pitched.

=== Miami Marlins ===
On July 24, 2015, Barraclough was traded to the Miami Marlins in exchange for Steve Cishek. He was called up to the major leagues for the first time on August 7. Barraclough struck out Joey Terdoslavich of the Atlanta Braves for his first Major League strikeout. In 25 appearances during his rookie campaign, Barraclough compiled a 2-1 record and 2.59 ERA with 30 strikeouts and 18 walks across 24 1/3 innings pitched.

Barraclough made 75 appearances out of the bullpen for Miami during the 2016 season, registering a 6-3 record and 2.85 ERA with 113 strikeouts across 72 2/3 innings pitched. He pitched in 66 contests for the Marlins in 2017, posting a 6-2 record and 3.00 ERA with 76 strikeouts over 66 innings of work.

On June 3, 2018, Barraclough replaced Brad Ziegler as Miami's closer. In 61 appearances for the Marlins on the season, he compiled a 1-6 record and 4.20 ERA with 60 strikeouts and 10 saves across 55 2/3 innings pitched.

=== Washington Nationals ===
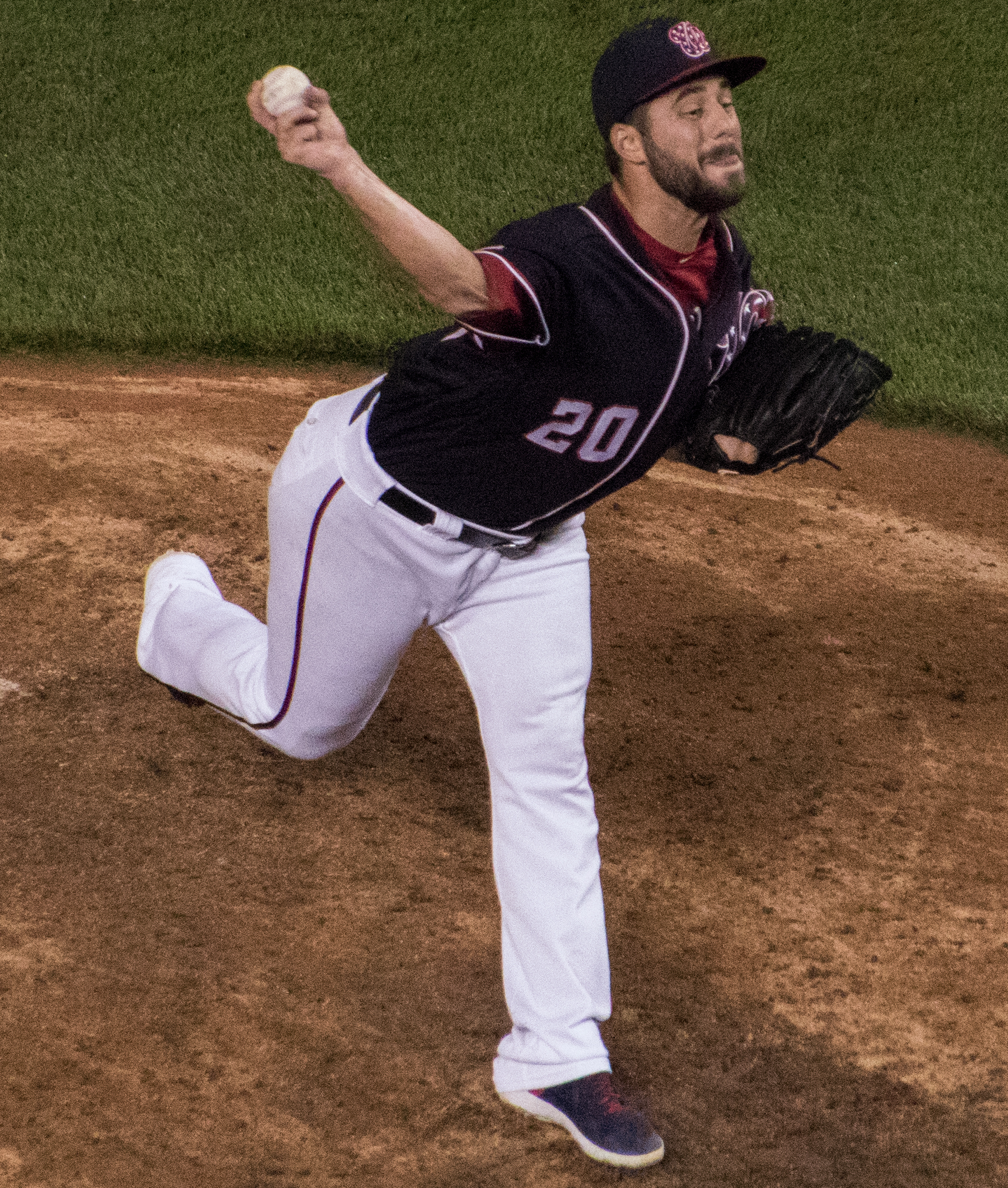
Barraclough with the Washington Nationals in 2019

On October 10, 2018, Barraclough was traded to the Washington Nationals for international slot value. He was sent down to the Harrisburg Senators of the Double–A Eastern League on July 27, 2019, after struggling to a 6.66 ERA in 33 appearances. On August 6, Barraclough was designated for assignment.

=== San Francisco Giants ===
On August 9, 2019, the San Francisco Giants claimed Barraclough from the Nationals off of waivers. On August 15, Barraclough was designated for assignment by San Francisco. He cleared waivers and was sent outright to the Triple-A Sacramento River Catsthe following day. On September 2, the Giants selected Barraclough's contract, adding him to their active roster. He made 10 appearances for San Francisco, recording a 2.25 ERA with 10 strikeouts over eight innings of work. Barraclough was designated for assignment on October 30 and elected free agency on November 1.

=== San Diego Padres ===
On December 17, 2019, Barraclough signed a minor league contract with the San Diego Padres organization. Barraclough did not play in a game in 2020 due to the cancellation of the minor league season because of the COVID-19 pandemic. He elected free agency on July 14, 2020.

=== New York Yankees ===
On February 2, 2021, Barraclough signed a minor league contract with the New York Yankees organization and was invited to Spring Training. Barraclough pitched to a 3.21 ERA in 14.0 innings of work for the Triple-A Scranton/Wilkes-Barre RailRiders, but was released on June 18.

=== Minnesota Twins ===
On June 20, 2021, Barraclough signed a minor league contract with the Minnesota Twins organization and was assigned to the Triple-A St. Paul Saints. After posting a 2.86 ERA with 31 strikeouts and 18 appearances for St. Paul, the Twins selected Barraclough's contract on August 19. Barraclough entered in relief for the Twins against the Yankees on August 20. Barraclough made 10 appearances for the Twins, going 2–0 with a 5.54 ERA and 18 strikeouts. On October 8, Barraclough was outrighted off of the 40-man roster. On October 14, Barraclough elected free agency.

=== Los Angeles Angels ===
On January 13, 2022, Barraclough signed a minor league contract with the Los Angeles Angels. He was assigned to the Triple-A Salt Lake Bees to begin the year. On May 7, Barraclough was selected to the 40-man and active rosters. Barraclough was designated for assignment on June 27 after Dillon Thomas was claimed off waivers. He was outrighted off the roster on June 30. He finished the season at 0–1 record with a 3.00 ERA and nine strikeouts in eight games. In 41 appearances for Salt Lake, Barraclough recorded a 3.00 ERA with 61 strikeouts and 2 saves in 45 innings pitched. On October 14, Barraclough elected to become a free agent.

=== High Point Rockers ===
On May 16, 2023, Barraclough signed with the High Point Rockers of the Atlantic League of Professional Baseball. In 7 games (2 starts) for the Rockers, Barraclough posted a 1.00 ERA with 17 strikeouts and one save in 18 innings of work.

=== Boston Red Sox ===
On June 19, 2023, Barraclough signed a minor-league contract with the Boston Red Sox organization. Barraclough was assigned the Red Sox Triple-A affiliate, the Worcester Red Sox. He enjoyed success in Worcester, going 7–0 with a 2.57 ERA in eight appearances, including seven starts. On August 9, his contract was selected and he was promoted to the major leagues. He made his Red Sox debut on August 11 in relief against the Detroit Tigers, pitching 1 1/3 scoreless innings with three strikeouts and earning the win. He was optioned back to Worcester on August 13, as Garrett Whitlock was activated from the injured list, and recalled again on August 28. Barraclough was hit hard during his second call-up, as Red Sox manager Alex Cora left him in a game against the Houston Astros (whom the Red Sox were pursuing for a postseason wild card berth) for 4 1/3 innings during which he threw a career-high 94 pitches while allowing 11 hits and 10 earned runs, while also hitting three batters. The decision was attributed to the majority of Boston's bullpen being tired, leaving Barraclough to pitch multiple innings despite the outcome. Cora gave Barraclough the option to end his outing before the ninth inning and have a position player pitch, but Barraclough declined and finished the game. Barraclough was optioned back to Worcester the next day. On September 24, Barraclough was designated for assignment following the activation of Zack Kelly from the injured list. On September 26, he cleared waivers and was subsequently outrighted to Worcester. Barraclough elected free agency on October 10.

=== High Point Rockers (second stint) ===
On April 24, 2024, Barraclough signed with the High Point Rockers of the Atlantic League of Professional Baseball. In two starts for the club, Barraclough registered a 2.00 ERA with 12 strikeouts across 9 innings pitched.

=== Texas Rangers ===
On May 6, 2024, Barraclough's contract was purchased by the Texas Rangers. In 31 appearances for the Triple-A Round Rock Express, posting a 1-4 record and 3.74 ERA with 67 strikeouts and 4 saves across 55 1/3 innings pitched. Barraclough elected free agency following the season on November 4.

=== High Point Rockers (third stint) ===
On April 16, 2025, Barraclough signed with the High Point Rockers of the Atlantic League of Professional Baseball. In eight starts for High Point, Barraclough logged a 5-0 record and 3.51 ERA with 38 strikeouts over 41 innings of work.

=== Guerreros de Oaxaca ===
On June 20, 2025, Barraclough signed with the Guerreros de Oaxaca of the Mexican League. He made eight starts for Oaxaca, posting a 3-3 record and 4.86 ERA with 37 strikeouts over 37 innings of work. On April 10, 2026, Barraclough was released by the Guerreros.

== Personal ==
Barraclough grew up a Giants fan.
