= Brett Graves =

American baseball player (born 1993)

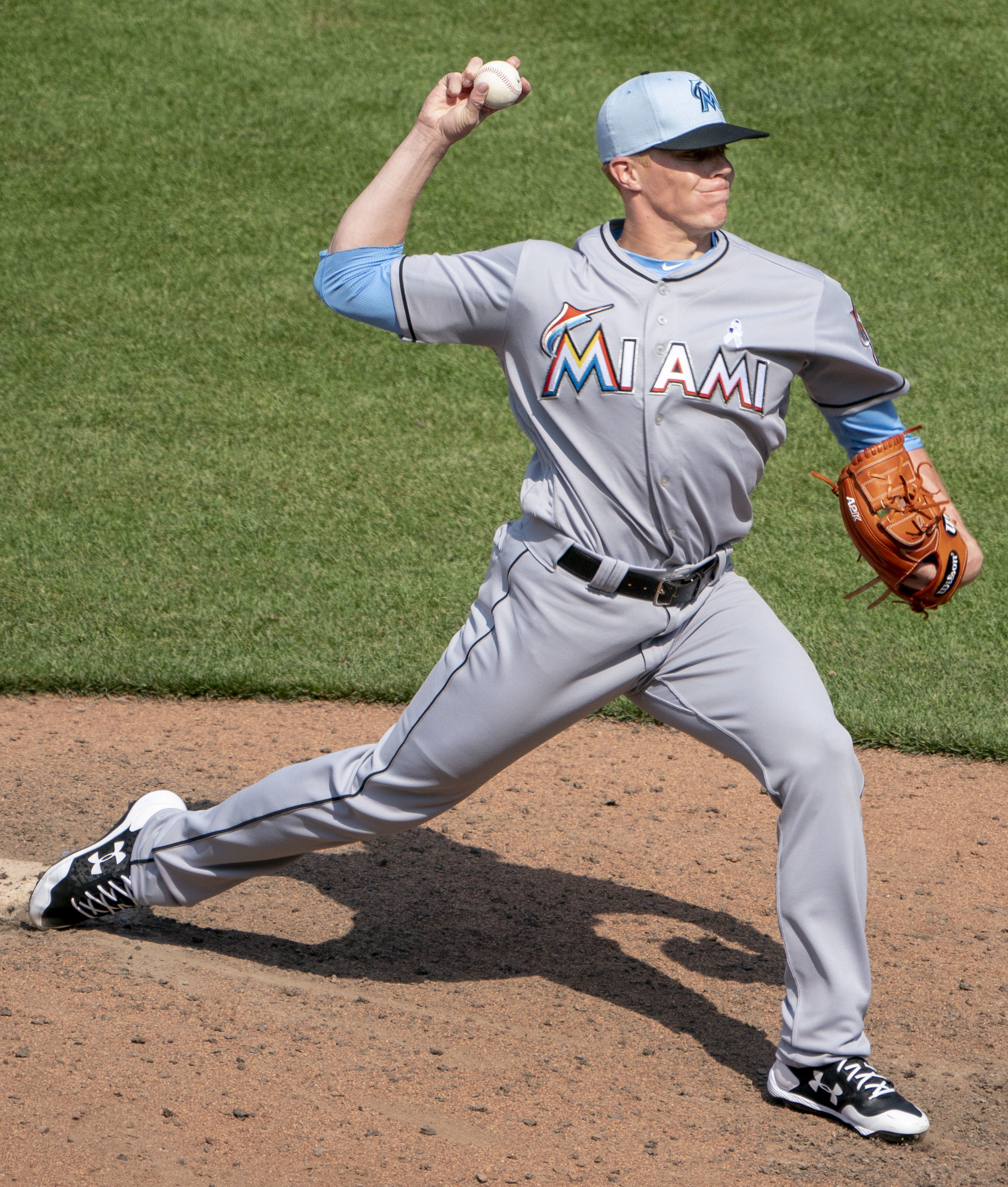
- Graves with the Miami Marlins in 2018
- Pitcher
- Born: January 30, 1993 (age 33); St. Charles, Missouri, U.S.
- Batted: Right Threw: Right

MLB debut
- June 17, 2018, for the Miami Marlins

Last MLB appearance
- September 26, 2018, for the Miami Marlins

MLB statistics
- Win–loss record: 1–1
- Earned run average: 5.40
- Strikeouts: 21
- Stats at Baseball Reference

Teams
- Miami Marlins (2018)

Brett Thomas Graves (born January 30, 1993) is an American former professional baseball pitcher. He played in Major League Baseball (MLB) for the Miami Marlins in 2018.

== Amateur career ==
Graves attended Francis Howell High School in Weldon Spring, Missouri. He played for the school's baseball team as a pitcher and shortstop and for the Gridiron football team as their quarterback. In 2011, his senior year, the St. Louis Post-Dispatch named him their All-Metro baseball player of the year and he won the Gatorade Baseball Player of the Year for Missouri.

The St. Louis Cardinals selected Graves in the 26th round of the 2011 MLB draft. Rather than sign, he attended the University of Missouri and played college baseball for the Missouri Tigers. In his junior year, Graves led the Tigers in games started, innings pitched, and strikeouts.

== Professional career ==
=== Oakland Athletics ===
The Oakland Athletics selected Graves in the third round of the 2014 Major League Baseball draft. He signed and spent his first professional season with both the Arizona Athletics of the Rookie-level Arizona League and the Vermont Lake Monsters of the Low-A New York-Penn League, posting a combined 3–2 win–loss record and a 6.55 earned run average (ERA) in 22 total innings. He spent the 2015 season with the Beloit Snappers of the Single-A Midwest League, where he went 12–8 with a 5.36 ERA, and the 2016 season with the Stockton Ports of the High-A California League, where he posted a 7–10 record and 4.60 ERA. In 2017, he pitched for both Stockton and the Midland RockHounds of the Double-A Texas League, going 1–1 with a 4.47 ERA in 56 1/3 total innings pitched. His 2017 season ended prematurely due to a strained tendon in his right ankle.

=== Miami Marlins ===
On December 14, 2017, the Miami Marlins selected Graves from the Athletics organization in the Rule 5 draft. He began the regular season on the 60-day disabled list, due to an oblique muscle strain, and made his major league debut on June 17, 2018. Graves made 21 appearances for the Marlins during his rookie campaign, compiling a 1-1 record and 5.40 ERA with 21 strikeouts and one save across 33 1/3 innings pitched. On December 11, Graves was removed from the 40-man roster and sent outright to the Triple–A New Orleans Baby Cakes.

Graves split the 2019 season between New Orleans and the Double–A Jacksonville Jumbo Shrimp, posting a cumulative 5–5 record and 2.60 ERA with 73 strikeouts and eight saves. He did not play in a game in 2020 due to the cancellation of the minor league season because of the COVID-19 pandemic.

=== Oakland Athletics (second stint) ===
On December 10, 2020, Graves was selected by the Oakland Athletics in the minor league phase of the Rule 5 draft. He made 21 appearances for the Double–A Midland RockHounds, logging a 1–2 record and 7.11 ERA with 29 strikeouts and one save across 25 1/3 innings pitched. Graves elected free agency following the season on November 7, 2021.

== See also ==
- Rule 5 draft results
