= Ben Meyer =

American baseball player (born 1993)

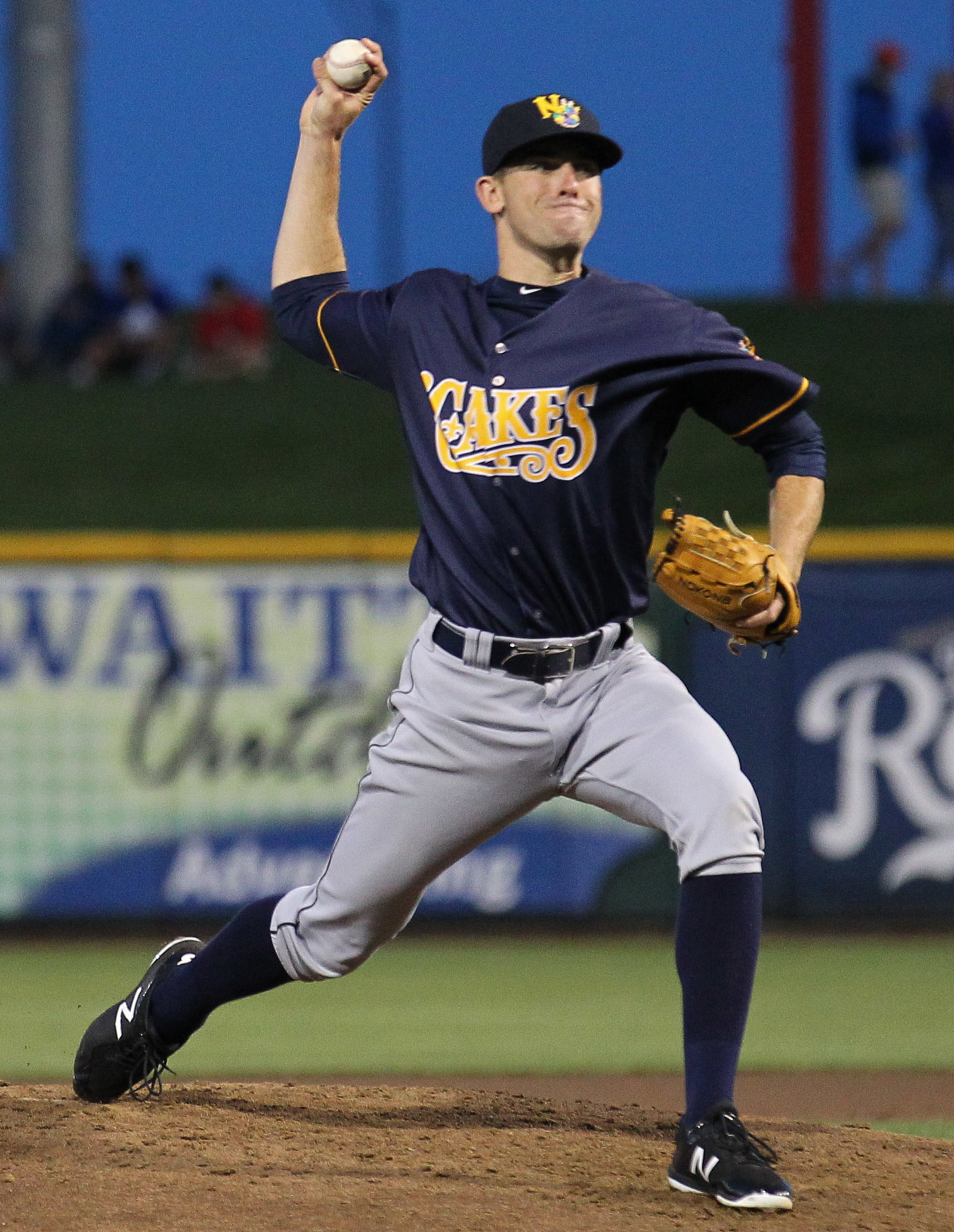
- Meyer with the New Orleans Baby Cakes in 2018
- Pitcher
- Born: January 30, 1993 (age 33); Minneapolis, Minnesota, U.S.
- Batted: Left Threw: Right

MLB debut
- June 7, 2018, for the Miami Marlins

Last MLB appearance
- September 25, 2018, for the Miami Marlins

MLB statistics
- Win–loss record: 0–0
- Earned run average: 10.42
- Strikeouts: 9
- Stats at Baseball Reference

Teams
- Miami Marlins (2018)

Benjamin K. Meyer (born January 30, 1993) is an American former professional baseball pitcher. He has previously played in Major League Baseball (MLB) for the Miami Marlins.

== Career ==
=== Amateur ===
Meyer attended Totino-Grace High School in Fridley, Minnesota and played college baseball at the University of Minnesota. In 2013, he played collegiate summer baseball with the Brewster Whitecaps of the Cape Cod Baseball League. In 2015, as a senior at Minnesota, he was 4-6 with a 4.31 ERA. In 288 total innings pitched for Minnesota over for years, he struck out 219 and compiled a 3.07 ERA.

=== Miami Marlins ===
After his senior year, the Miami Marlins selected Meyer in the 25th round of the 2015 MLB draft and he signed.

After signing, Meyer made his professional debut in June for the GCL Marlins. He was promoted to the Jupiter Hammerheads later in the month and the Greensboro Grasshoppers in August. In 35 relief innings pitched between the three clubs, he was 1-2 with a 2.57 ERA. In 2016, he played for Greensboro where he pitched to a 4-11 record and a 3.62 ERA in 33 games (ten starts), and in 2017, he played with both Greensboro and Jupiter, compiling a 6-3 record with a 2.02 ERA and a 0.93 WHIP in 32 games (12 starts), striking out 134 batters in 111.1 innings. After the season, he played in the Arizona Fall League. He began 2018 with the New Orleans Baby Cakes.

Miami promoted Meyer to the major leagues on June 6, 2018. In ten starts for New Orleans prior to his promotion, he was 3-4 with a 4.09 ERA and a 1.22 WHIP. He made his major league debut on June 7, pitching one scoreless inning of relief against the St. Louis Cardinals at Busch Stadium. He was designated for assignment on November 20, 2018 and then invited to spring training. He began 2019 with the New Orleans Baby Cakes and played with them before his release on June 25, 2019.

=== Colorado Rockies ===
On June 30, 2019, Meyer signed a minor league contract with the Colorado Rockies and was assigned to the Double-A Hartford Yard Goats. He also played with the Triple-A Albuquerque Isotopes, and logged a 7.59 ERA in Triple-A and a 9.00 ERA in Double-A to finish the year. Meyer did not play in a game in 2020 due to the cancellation of the minor league season because of the COVID-19 pandemic. On June 2, 2021, Meyer was released by the Rockies organization without playing in a game on the year.
