= Drew Rucinski =

American baseball player (born 1988)

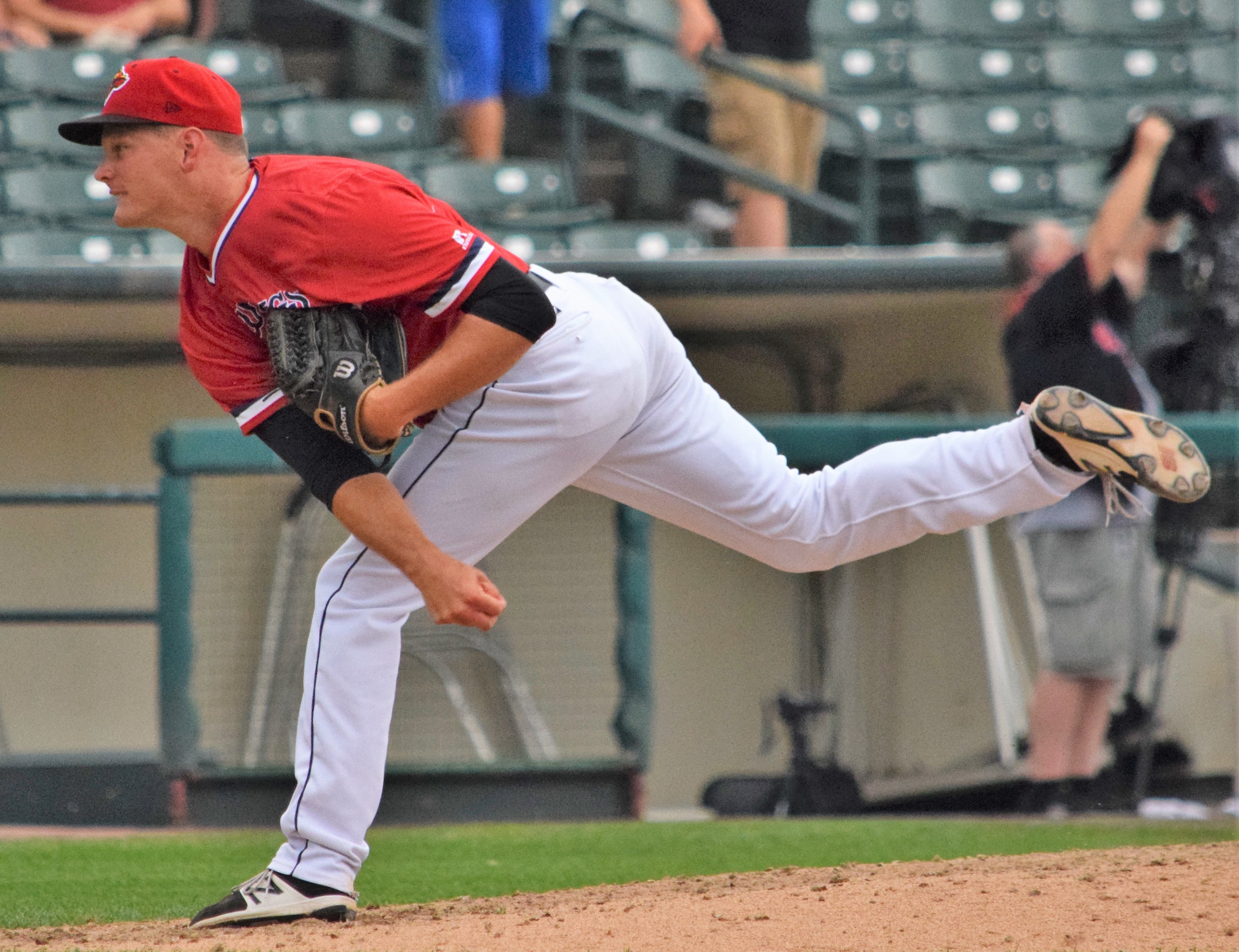
- Rucinski with the Rochester Red Wings in 2017
- Pitcher
- Born: December 30, 1988 (age 37); Neenah, Wisconsin, U.S.
- Batted: Right Threw: Right

Professional debut
- MLB: July 10, 2014, for the Los Angeles Angels of Anaheim
- KBO: March 24, 2019, for the NC Dinos

Last appearance
- KBO: October 6, 2022, for the NC Dinos
- MLB: May 15, 2023, for the Oakland Athletics

MLB statistics
- Win–loss record: 4–8
- Earned run average: 6.25
- Strikeouts: 50

KBO statistics
- Win–loss record: 53-36
- Earned run average: 3.06
- Strikeouts: 657
- Stats at Baseball Reference

Teams
- Los Angeles Angels of Anaheim (2014–2015); Minnesota Twins (2017); Miami Marlins (2018); NC Dinos (2019–2022); Oakland Athletics (2023)

Career highlights and awards
- KBO: Korean Series champion (2020); 1x KBO All–Star (2022)

Drew James Rucinski (born December 30, 1988) is an American former professional baseball pitcher. He has previously played in Major League Baseball (MLB) for the Los Angeles Angels of Anaheim, Minnesota Twins, Miami Marlins, and Oakland Athletics, and in the KBO League for the NC Dinos.

== Career ==
Rucinski attended Union High School in Tulsa, Oklahoma. He played college baseball at Ohio State University for the Ohio State Buckeyes from 2008 to 2011.

=== Cleveland Indians ===
The Cleveland Indians signed Rucinski as an undrafted free agent on June 15, 2011. He spent his first professional season split between the rookie–level Arizona League Indians, Low–A Mahoning Valley Scrappers, and Single–A Lake County Captains. In 22 appearances out of the bullpen, he logged a cumulative 4–0 record and 2.92 ERA with 47 strikeouts in 37.0 innings of work. Rucinski was released by the Indians organization on March 28, 2012.

=== Rockford RiverHawks/Aviators ===
On April 23, 2012, Rucinski signed with the Rockford RiverHawks of the Frontier League. In 22 games (15 starts), Rucinski logged a 7–4 record and 3.13 ERA with 91 strikeouts in 103 2/3 innings pitched. In 2013, Rucinski returned to Rockford, now the Aviators, making 15 starts and posting a 4–6 record and 2.88 ERA with 101 strikeouts in 100.0 innings of work.

=== Los Angeles Angels of Anaheim ===
On August 6, 2013, Rucinski signed a minor league contract with the Los Angeles Angels organization. He finished the year with the High–A Inland Empire 66ers, posting a 1.86 ERA across 5 starts. In 2014, Rucinski made 26 starts for the Double–A Arkansas Travelers, logging a 10–6 record and 3.15 ERA with 140 strikeouts in 148 2/3 innings pitched.

On July 10, 2014, Rucinski was selected to the 40-man roster and promoted to the major leagues for the first time. In 3 games for the Angels, he logged a 4.91 ERA with 8 strikeouts in 7 1/3 innings pitched. In 2015, Rucinski made the Angels' Opening Day roster, beating out Andrew Heaney and Nick Tropeano. He made only 4 appearances for the team, struggling to a 7.71 ERA with 4 strikeouts in 7.0 innings of work. On September 1, 2015, Rucinski was designated for assignment following the promotion of Wesley Wright. On September 4, he cleared waivers and was sent outright to the Triple–A Salt Lake Bees. He elected free agency following the season on November 6.

=== Chicago Cubs ===
On November 16, 2015, Rucinski signed a minor league contract with the Chicago Cubs organization. He spent the 2016 season with the Triple–A Iowa Cubs, making 28 starts and posting a 7–15 record and 5.92 ERA with 116 strikeouts in 155.0 innings of work. Rucinski elected free agency following the season on November 7, 2016.

=== Minnesota Twins ===
On December 15, 2016, Rucinski signed a minor league contract with the Minnesota Twins. He began the 2017 season with the Triple–A Rochester Red Wings, posting a 3.48 ERA with 13 strikeouts in 10 1/3 innings pitched. On May 5, 2017, the Twins selected Rucinski's contract, adding him to the major league roster. He struggled immensely in two appearances for Minnesota, allowing five runs on ten hits and two walks in 4 1/3 innings of work. On June 11, Rucinski was designated for assignment following the promotion of Nik Turley. On June 15, he re–signed with the Twins on a minor league deal after briefly becoming a free agent. On September 6, Rucinski was released by the Twins organization.

=== Miami Marlins ===
On November 30, 2017, Rucinski signed a minor league contract with the Miami Marlins. He began the 2018 season with the Triple–A New Orleans Baby Cakes, posting a 2.52 ERA with 21 strikeouts across 14 appearances. Rucinski had his contract purchased to the major league roster on June 3, 2018. He made 32 relief appearances for Miami, recording a 4.33 ERA with 27 strikeouts in 35 1/3 innings pitched. On October 27, Rucinski was removed from the 40–man roster and sent outright to Triple–A New Orleans; however, he subsequently elected free agency in lieu of the assignment.

=== NC Dinos ===
On November 29, 2018, Rucinski signed a one-year, $600,000 contract with the NC Dinos of the KBO League. On January 1, 2021, Rucinski re-signed with the Dinos on a one-year, $1.6 million contract. He posted a 15–10 record with a 3.17 ERA and 177 strikeouts over 178 2/3 innings. On December 21, 2021, Rucinski re-signed with the Dinos to a $2 million deal, which tied for the second-most lucrative contract for a foreign player at the time of his signing. Rucinski was named a KBO All-Star for the team in 2022. He became a free agent after the 2022 season.

=== Oakland Athletics ===
On December 21, 2022, Rucinski signed a one-year contract with the Oakland Athletics that contains a club option for the 2024 season. He began the 2023 season working out of Oakland's rotation, and went 0–4 through his first 4 starts with the club. On May 20, 2023, Rucinski was placed on the injured list with a gastrointestinal illness. On June 11, it was announced that he had recovered from the illness, but was dealing with a low–grade MCL sprain of his right knee. On June 20, Rucinski was transferred to the 60-day injured list. On July 18, it was announced that he would undergo season–ending back surgery to address a degenerative condition.
