= Peter O'Brien (outfielder) =

American baseball player (born 1990)

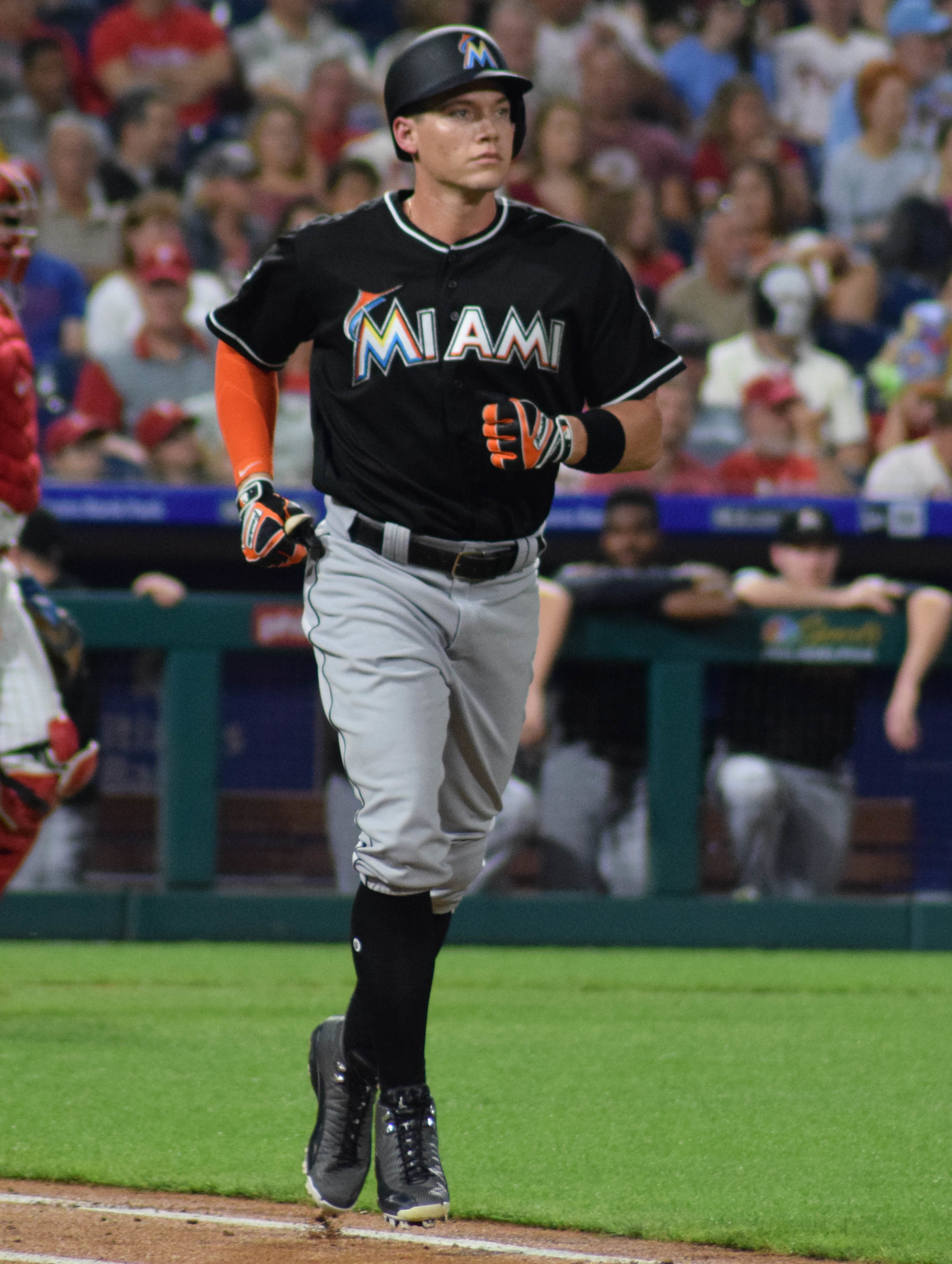
- O'Brien with the Miami Marlins in 2018

Free agent
- Left fielder
- Born: July 15, 1990 (age 36); Miami Gardens, Florida, U.S.
- Bats: Right Throws: Right

MLB debut
- September 11, 2015, for the Arizona Diamondbacks

MLB statistics (through 2019 season)
- Batting average: .209
- Home runs: 11
- Runs batted in: 26
- Stats at Baseball Reference

Teams
- Arizona Diamondbacks (2015–2016); Miami Marlins (2018–2019)

Peter Robert O'Brien (born July 15, 1990) is an American professional baseball left fielder who is a free agent. He has previously played in Major League Baseball (MLB) for the Arizona Diamondbacks and Miami Marlins.

== Amateur career ==
O'Brien attended G. Holmes Braddock High School in Miami, Florida. He played for the school's baseball team, and transitioned to catcher during his senior year. Unselected in the 2008 MLB draft, O'Brien chose to enroll at Bethune–Cookman University, where he played college baseball for the Bethune–Cookman Wildcats team in the Mid-Eastern Athletic Conference (MEAC). In 2010, he was named MEAC player of the year. After the 2010 season, he played collegiate summer baseball with the Bourne Braves of the Cape Cod Baseball League.

The Colorado Rockies selected O'Brien in the third round of the 2011 MLB draft, but he opted not to sign, and instead transferred to the University of Miami for his senior year, where he played for the Miami Hurricanes baseball team in the Atlantic Coast Conference (ACC). He was named All-ACC for the 2012 season.

== Professional career ==
=== New York Yankees ===
The New York Yankees selected O'Brien in the second round of the 2012 MLB draft, and O'Brien signed with the Yankees. O'Brien started his professional career with the Gulf Coast Yankees and after four games was promoted to the Staten Island Yankees. He finished his first season hitting .212/.256/.401 with 10 home runs and 34 runs batted in. O'Brien started the 2013 season with the Charleston RiverDogs. On June 21, 2013, he was promoted to the Tampa Yankees. After the 2013 season, he competed in the Arizona Fall League and played third base.

He was a non-roster invitee to Yankees spring training before the start of the 2014 season. O'Brien began the year with the Class AA Trenton Thunder and was named to the MLB Futures Game and Eastern League All-Star Game.

=== Arizona Diamondbacks ===
The Yankees traded O'Brien to the Arizona Diamondbacks for Martín Prado on July 31, 2014. The Diamondbacks assigned him to the Mobile BayBears of the Double–A Southern League an emphasized his role as a catcher. After the 2014 season, the Diamondbacks assigned O'Brien to the Arizona Fall League to get more reps behind the plate. The Diamondbacks assigned O'Brien to the Reno Aces of the Triple–A Pacific Coast League (PCL) in 2015, and converted him into an outfielder. On July 14, 2015, O'Brien participated in the Triple A Homerun Derby. He finished in second place with a total of 20 home runs.

O'Brien made his major league debut on September 11, 2015, at Chase Field against the Los Angeles Dodgers. He went 1-for-1 and drove in his first run while pinch hitting for pitcher Enrique Burgos. His first hit was a ground ball single up the middle to center field, coming off of Ian Thomas. He drove in shortstop Nick Ahmed on the hit. He appeared in eight games as a pinch hitter and left fielder.

O'Brien was called up to the big league club on June 10 after hitting .330 with 17 home runs and 52 RBI in 212 at-bats at Triple-A. However, after only seven hits in 56 at-bats with 24 strikeouts, he was sent back down on July 4. He returned to the majors on September 6 and was used sparingly as a pinch hitter. O'Brien was designated for assignment by the Diamondbacks on December 23, 2016.

=== Kansas City Royals ===
The Diamondbacks traded O'Brien to the Kansas City Royals for minor leaguer Sam Lewis. Following the Royals Spring Training camp, O'Brien was sent back to the minors and briefly played for the Omaha Storm Chasers of the PCL, before he was designated for assignment on May 10, 2017.

=== Cincinnati Reds ===
On May 16, 2017, the Cincinnati Reds claimed O'Brien off of waivers and assigned him to the Louisville Bats of the Triple-A International League. He played in five games for Louisville, and was designated for assignment by Cincinnati on May 25.

=== Texas Rangers ===
On May 27, 2017, the Texas Rangers claimed O'Brien off waivers. After playing in 16 games for the Triple-A Round Rock Express and Double-A Frisco RoughRiders, O'Brien was again designated for assignment on June 17, 2017, when Ernesto Frieri was selected to the roster.

=== Los Angeles Dodgers ===
O'Brien was claimed off waivers by the Los Angeles Dodgers on June 18, 2017. After hitting .219/.297/.465 in 45 games for the Double-A Tulsa Drillers, O'Brien was designated for assignment by the Dodgers on July 31. He was outrighted to the Triple-A Oklahoma City Dodgers on August 3.

=== Miami Marlins ===
On May 31, 2018, O'Brien was traded to the Miami Marlins in exchange for cash considerations. O'Brien had his contract selected on September 4, 2018. He hit 4 home runs with 10 RBI in 22 games for the Marlins in 2018.

He competed for an outfield position in spring training, but was ultimately sent down to the minors before the start of the 2019 season. He was soon recalled on March 31 but was optioned again on April 12 after just three hits and 14 strikeouts in 30 at-bats. O'Brien returned to the majors on May 4 but suffered a rib injury just a few days later, sending him to the Disabled List. After hitting .167/.255/.262 in 14 games, the Marlins designated him for assignment on June 20. He was outrighted to Triple-A and spent the remainder of the season with the New Orleans Baby Cakes. O'Brien elected free agency on October 15, 2019.

=== Atlanta Braves ===
O'Brien signed a minor league contract with the Atlanta Braves as a non-roster invitee before the 2020 season. He played for the Dominican Republic during the 2020 Caribbean Series. However, he did not play in any MLB games that year due to the cancellation of the minor league season because of the COVID-19 pandemic. O’Brien was added to Atlanta's player pool for the 2020 season. He was released by the Braves organization on August 16, 2020.

=== Toros de Tijuana ===
On April 27, 2021, O'Brien signed with the Toros de Tijuana of the Mexican League. In 60 games, he hit .258/.303/.554 with 16 home runs and 39 RBIs. O'Brien hit a go-ahead home run in Game 7 of the Serie del Rey, which culminated in a 3–0 win and the Toros' second league championship.

=== Pericos de Puebla ===
On December 24, 2021, O'Brien signed with Pericos de Puebla of the Mexican League. O'Brien played in 85 games for Puebla in 2022, hitting .298/.375/.676 with 32 home runs and 78 RBI.

In 2023, O'Brien returned to Puebla for a second season. He hit .316/.389/.601 with 20 home runs and 59 RBI in 87 games. With Puebla, O'Brien won his second Serie del Rey championship.

O'Brien made 73 appearances for the Pericos in 2024, batting .285/.368/.559 with 16 home runs and 42 RBI. O'Brien was released by Puebla prior to the start of the season on April 16, 2025.

== Personal life ==
O'Brien was born and raised in Miami Gardens, Florida. His mother, Mercedes, immigrated from Cuba and was a former dancer in the Cuban National Ballet. His father, Terry, is an American former college baseball player. O'Brien is bilingual and learned Spanish as his first language.
