= 2019 National League Division Series =

American baseball games

Teams
Team (Wins)		Manager	Season
Washington Nationals (3)		Dave Martinez	93–69 (.574), GB: 4
Los Angeles Dodgers (2)		Dave Roberts	106–56 (.654), GA: 21
- Dates: October 3–9
- Television: TBS
- TV announcers: Ernie Johnson Jr., Jeff Francoeur, and Alex Chappell
- Radio: ESPN
- Radio announcers: Jon Sciambi and Jessica Mendoza
- Umpires: Jordan Baker, Ted Barrett (crew chief), Doug Eddings, Tripp Gibson, Will Little, Alfonso Márquez

Teams
Team (Wins)		Manager	Season
St. Louis Cardinals (3)		Mike Shildt	91–71 (.562), GA: 2
Atlanta Braves (2)		Brian Snitker	97–65 (.599), GA: 4
- Dates: October 3–9
- Television: TBS
- TV announcers: Brian Anderson, Ron Darling, and Lauren Shehadi
- Radio: ESPN
- Radio announcers: Chris Berman (Games 1–2, 4–5); Adam Amin (Game 3) and Rick Sutcliffe
- Umpires: Tom Hallion, Ed Hickox, Pat Hoberg, Sam Holbrook (crew chief), Alan Porter, Jim Wolf
- NLWC: Washington Nationals defeated Milwaukee Brewers, 4–3

The 2019 National League Division Series were two best-of-five playoff series on the National League side in Major League Baseball’s 2019 postseason to determine the participating teams of the 2019 National League Championship Series. The three divisional winners, seeded first through third, and a fourth team—determined by the NL Wild Card Game—played in two series. These matchups were:

- (1) Los Angeles Dodgers (NL West champions) vs. (4) Washington Nationals (Wild Card Game winner): Nationals won the series, 3–2.
- (2) Atlanta Braves (NL East champions) vs. (3) St. Louis Cardinals (NL Central champions): Cardinals won the series, 3–2.

The team with the better regular season record (higher-seed) hosted Games 1, 2, and (if necessary) 5, with the lower-seeded team hosting Games 3 and (if necessary) 4.

The Nationals would go on to defeat the Cardinals in the NLCS, for their first League pennant. They then won the 2019 World Series over the American League champion Houston Astros, for their first-ever World title.

For the third straight year, Major League Baseball sold presenting sponsorships to all of its postseason series. This NLDS was sponsored by Utz and officially known as the 2019 National League Division Series presented by Utz Snacks. The Cardinals and Nationals won their respective series to advance to the Championship Series.

This was the first time that both NLDS winners overcame a 2–1 series deficit in the same year.

== Background ==
Seeds 1–3 were determined by regular season winning percentages among division-winning teams. Those seeds were locked in on the last day of the season, September 29. The final seed was the winner of the National League Wild Card Game.

The Los Angeles Dodgers became the first team to clinch a playoff berth by clinching the National League West title on September 10, and secured the best record in NL via their league-leading winning percentage on September 24. They played the Washington Nationals, who defeated the Milwaukee Brewers on October 1 in the Wild Card Game. Los Angeles won the regular season series 4–3 against Washington.

The Atlanta Braves clinched a playoff berth on September 14, the National League East on September 20, and the second-seed in the NLDS via their winning percentage. They played the 3-seed St. Louis Cardinals, who clinched the National League Central on September 29, the final day of the regular season. The Braves won the regular season series 4–2 against the Cardinals.

This was the league-leading 15th NLDS appearance for Atlanta, and 14th for both Los Angeles and St. Louis. This was the Nationals' fifth division series appearance in team history, and the sixth in franchise history (once as the Montreal Expos).

== Matchups ==
=== Los Angeles Dodgers vs. Washington Nationals ===
Washington won the series, 3–2.

Game	Date	Score	Location	Time	Attendance
1	October 3	Washington Nationals – 0, Los Angeles Dodgers – 6	Dodger Stadium	3:23	53,095
2	October 4	Washington Nationals – 4, Los Angeles Dodgers – 2	Dodger Stadium	3:37	53,086
3	October 6	Los Angeles Dodgers – 10, Washington Nationals – 4	Nationals Park	3:58	43,423
4	October 7	Los Angeles Dodgers – 1, Washington Nationals – 6	Nationals Park	3:24	36,847
5	October 9	Washington Nationals – 7, Los Angeles Dodgers – 3 (10)	Dodger Stadium	4:06	54,159

=== Atlanta Braves vs. St. Louis Cardinals ===
St. Louis won the series, 3–2.

Game	Date	Score	Location	Time	Attendance
1	October 3	St. Louis Cardinals – 7, Atlanta Braves – 6	SunTrust Park	4:07	42,631
2	October 4	St. Louis Cardinals – 0, Atlanta Braves – 3	SunTrust Park	2:46	42,911
3	October 6	Atlanta Braves – 3, St. Louis Cardinals – 1	Busch Stadium	3:22	46,701
4	October 7	Atlanta Braves – 4, St. Louis Cardinals – 5 (10)	Busch Stadium	4:06	42,203
5	October 9	St. Louis Cardinals – 13, Atlanta Braves – 1	SunTrust Park	3:17	43,122

== Los Angeles vs. Washington ==
This was the third postseason meeting between the Dodgers and the Nationals franchise. The most recent meeting was in the 2016 National League Division Series, with Los Angeles winning in five. The other took place in the 1981 National League Championship Series, in which the Dodgers won the National League pennant over the then-Montreal Expos in five games.

=== Game 1 ===
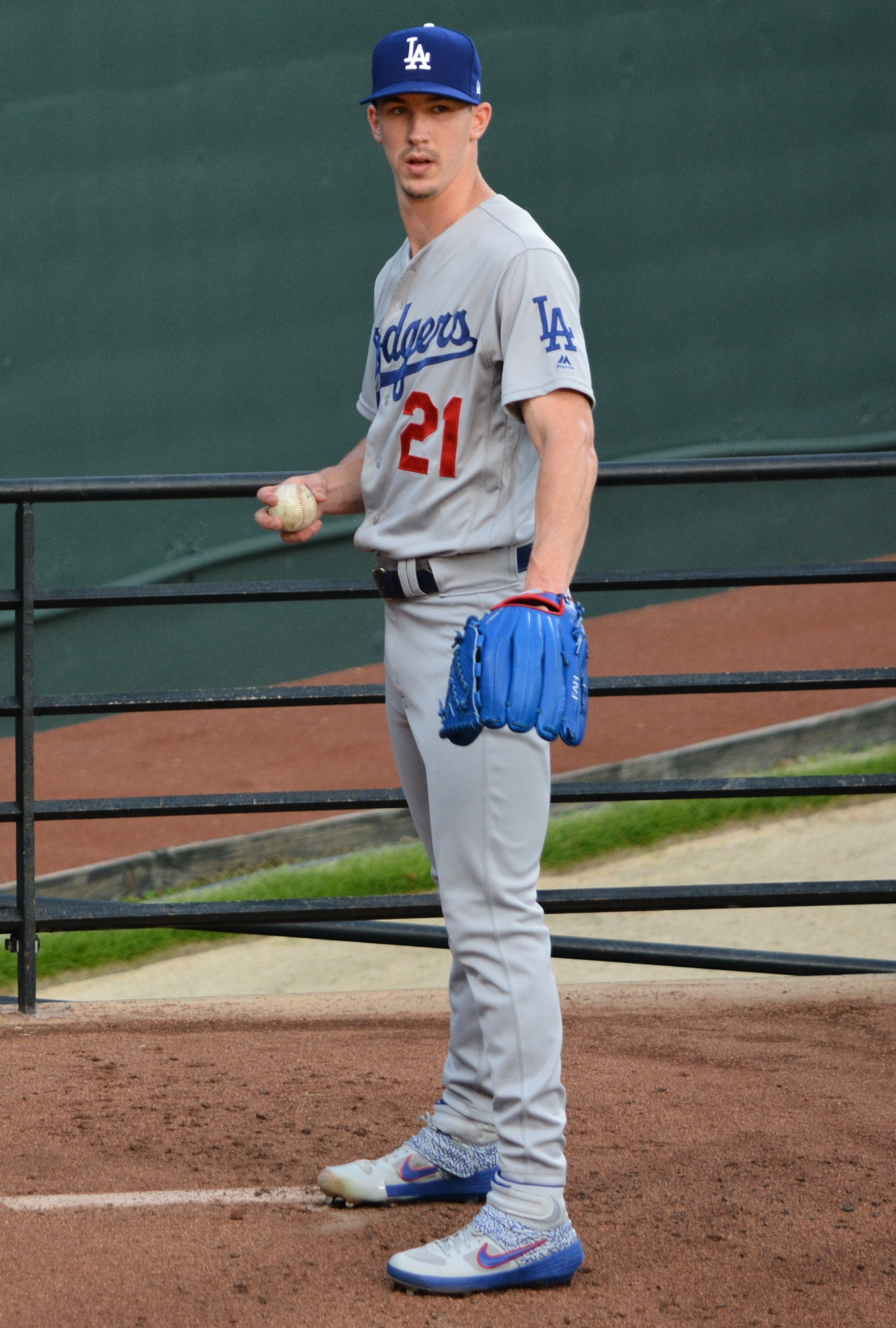
Game 1 winning pitcher Walker Buehler

October 3, 2019 5:37 pm (PDT) at Dodger Stadium in Los Angeles, California, 75 °F (24 °C), clear
Team	1	2	3	4	5	6	7	8	9	R	H	E
Washington	0	0	0	0	0	0	0	0	0	0	2	2
Los Angeles	1	0	0	0	1	0	2	2	X	6	7	0
WP: Walker Buehler (1–0) LP: Patrick Corbin (0–1); Home runs: WAS: None; LAD: Gavin Lux (1), Joc Pederson (1); Attendance: 53,095; Boxscore

Walker Buehler started game 1 for the Dodgers and Patrick Corbin for the Nationals. In the bottom of the first, Corbin walked four batters, including a bases loaded walk to Max Muncy to give the Dodgers the early lead. The Dodgers got another run in the fifth inning when Cody Bellinger scored on a fielding error by Howie Kendrick. Buehler allowed only one hit in six scoreless innings, while striking out eight and walking three. Corbin allowed only one earned run on three hits and five walks while striking out nine in six innings. Muncy drove in two more runs with a bases loaded single off Fernando Rodney in the seventh and Gavin Lux hit a pinch-hit homer off Hunter Strickland in the eighth. Joc Pederson also homered off Strickland to extend the lead, as the Dodgers held the Nationals to two hits in the 6–0 win. At 21 years and 314 days, Gavin Lux was the youngest player all-time to hit a pinch-hit home run in the playoffs. He was also the youngest Dodger to hit a home run in a playoff game, with that previous record belonging to Cody Bellinger, who homered at the age of 22 years and 88 days during the 2017 NLDS against the Arizona Diamondbacks.

=== Game 2 ===
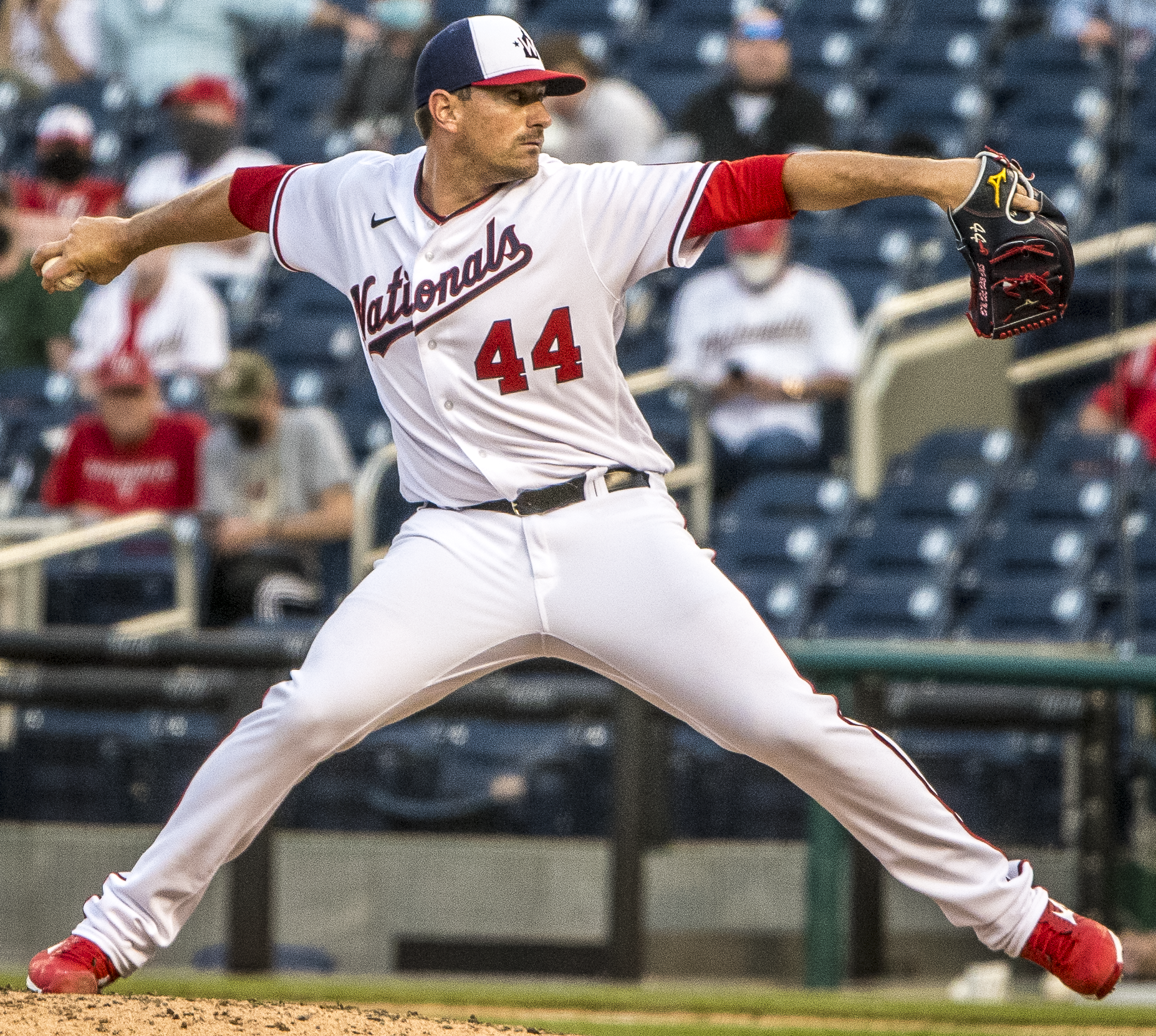
Daniel Hudson earned a save in Game 2

October 4, 2019 6:37 pm (PDT) at Dodger Stadium in Los Angeles, California, 72 °F (22 °C), clear
Team	1	2	3	4	5	6	7	8	9	R	H	E
Washington	1	2	0	0	0	0	0	1	0	4	10	0
Los Angeles	0	0	0	0	0	1	1	0	0	2	5	1
WP: Stephen Strasburg (1–0) LP: Clayton Kershaw (0–1) Sv: Daniel Hudson (1); Home runs: WAS: None; LAD: Max Muncy (1); Attendance: 53,086; Boxscore

The starting pitchers for game 2 were Clayton Kershaw for the Dodgers and Stephen Strasburg for the Nationals. The Nationals got on the board first when Howie Kendrick drove in Trea Turner with a single in the first. They got two more in the second on RBI hits by Adam Eaton and Anthony Rendon. Kershaw pitched six innings, allowing the three runs on six hits, two hit batters, and one walk with four strikeouts. The Dodgers finally scored on a sacrifice fly by Justin Turner in the sixth inning. Strasburg struck out 10 in six innings while only allowing one run on three hits. Max Muncy homered off Sean Doolittle in the seventh to cut the lead to one. The Nationals got the run back the next inning, when pinch-hitter Asdrúbal Cabrera singled to right off Dustin May to drive in a run from third. The Dodgers loaded the bases off Daniel Hudson in the ninth but failed to score and the Nationals evened up the series at one all with the 4–2 win. Hudson earned his second save this postseason.

=== Game 3 ===
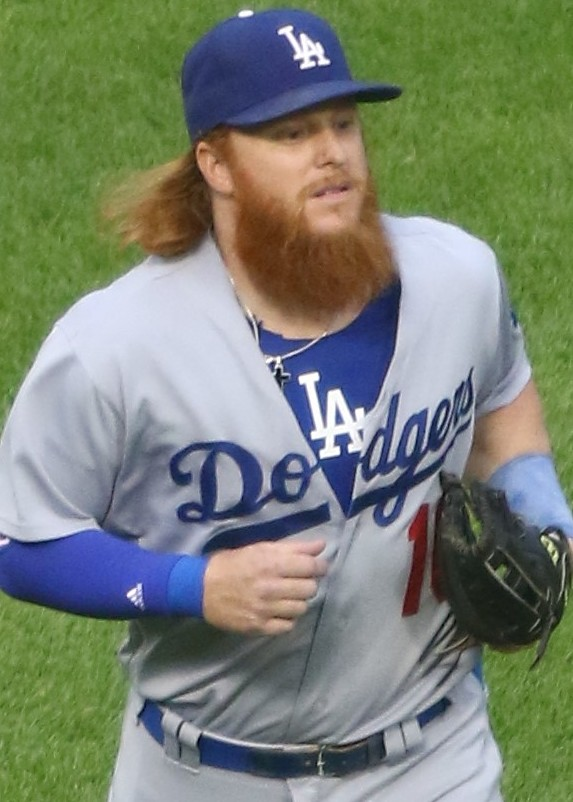
Justin Turner had a three-run home run in Game 3.

October 6, 2019 7:45 pm (EDT) at Nationals Park in Washington, D.C., 72 °F (22 °C), overcast
Team	1	2	3	4	5	6	7	8	9	R	H	E
Los Angeles	0	0	0	0	1	7	0	0	2	10	14	0
Washington	2	0	0	0	0	2	0	0	0	4	6	0
WP: Hyun-jin Ryu (1–0) LP: Patrick Corbin (0–2); Home runs: LAD: Max Muncy (2), Justin Turner (1), Russell Martin (1); WAS: Juan Soto (1); Attendance: 43,423; Boxscore

Game 3 featured a matchup between Aníbal Sánchez of the Nationals and Hyun-jin Ryu of the Dodgers. Juan Soto hit a two-run homer off Ryu in the first inning to give the Nationals the early lead. Muncy homered in the fifth off Sánchez to cut the lead in half. Sánchez pitched five innings, allowing the one run on four hits and two walks, with a season high nine strikeouts. Ryu allowed the two runs on four hits and two walks with three strikeouts. The Nationals used game 1 starter Patrick Corbin in relief in the sixth and Russell Martin drove in two runs with a double to give the Dodgers their first lead of the game. Kiké Hernández drove in two more later that inning with a pinch-hit double and Justin Turner followed that with a three-run home run off of Wander Suero. Joe Kelly loaded the bases the next inning and then threw a wild pitch that scored Anthony Rendon. A sacrifice fly by Asdrúbal Cabrera gave the Nationals another run. Martin hit a two-run homer off Hunter Strickland in the ninth to give the Dodgers ten runs in the game. They went on to win the game 10–4.

=== Game 4 ===
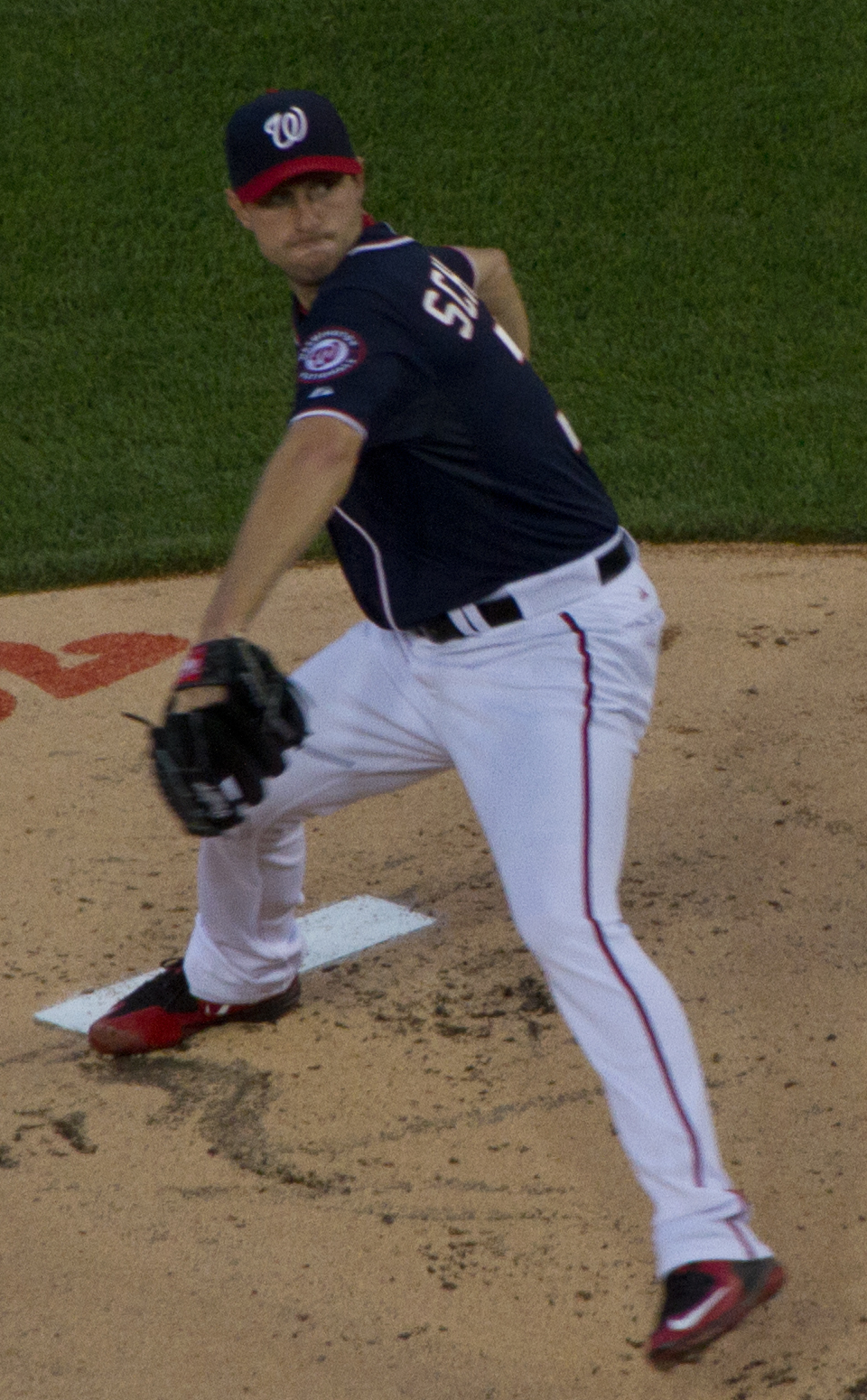
Game 4 winning pitcher Max Scherzer

October 7, 2019 6:40 pm (EDT) at Nationals Park in Washington, D.C., 80 °F (27 °C), partly cloudy
Team	1	2	3	4	5	6	7	8	9	R	H	E
Los Angeles	1	0	0	0	0	0	0	0	0	1	5	0
Washington	0	0	1	0	4	1	0	0	X	6	10	0
WP: Max Scherzer (1–0) LP: Julio Urías (0–1); Home runs: LAD: Justin Turner (2); WAS: Ryan Zimmerman (1); Attendance: 36,847; Boxscore

Max Scherzer started for the Nationals in Game 4 opposite Rich Hill for the Dodgers. Justin Turner hit a solo homer off Scherzer in the first inning to start the scoring. In the third inning, Hill loaded the bases on two walks and a single before Anthony Rendon hit a sacrifice fly to tie the score. He walked another batter to load the bases again but Kenta Maeda replaced Hill and got a groundout to end the inning. Hill wound up pitching 2 2/3 innings, with one run allowed on two hits and four walks. Trea Turner led off the fifth inning with a single off Julio Urías, advanced on a bunt and then scored the go-ahead run on a single by Rendon. Ryan Zimmerman hit a three-run home run off Pedro Báez later that inning. Rendon drove in another run with a sacrifice fly in the sixth off of Ross Stripling. Scherzer escaped a bases loaded jam in the seventh to pitch seven innings on 109 pitches, allowing only the one run on four hits and three walks with seven strikeouts. The Nationals secured a 6–1 victory, evening up the series and sending it to a winner-take-all fifth game.

=== Game 5 ===
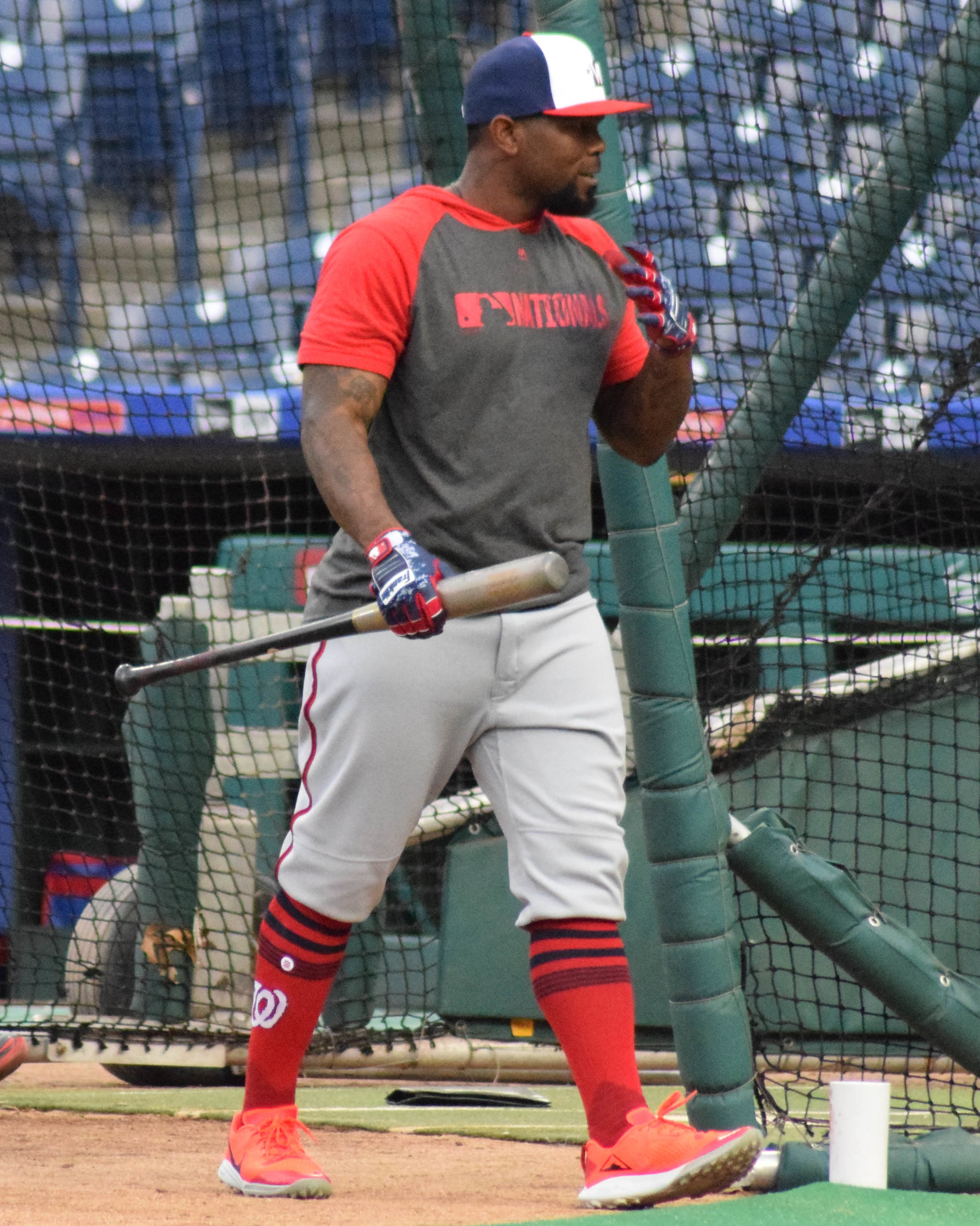
A 10th-inning grand slam by Howie Kendrick provided the Nationals' winning runs.

October 9, 2019 5:37 pm (PDT) at Dodger Stadium in Los Angeles, California, 71 °F (22 °C), clear
Team	1	2	3	4	5	6	7	8	9	10	R	H	E
Washington	0	0	0	0	0	1	0	2	0	4	7	9	1
Los Angeles	2	1	0	0	0	0	0	0	0	0	3	7	1
WP: Daniel Hudson (1–0) LP: Joe Kelly (0–1); Home runs: WAS: Anthony Rendon (1), Juan Soto (2), Howie Kendrick (1); LAD: Max Muncy (3), Kiké Hernández (1); Attendance: 54,159; Boxscore

External videos
- Game 5 Full replay on the MLB's official YouTube channel

Los Angeles and Washington previously met in one NLDS Game 5, with the Dodgers winning in 2016. Los Angeles was 2–1 in prior NLDS Game 5 appearances, while Washington was 1–3 (their one win was in 1981, as the Montreal Expos). This game featured a matchup of Game 1 winner Walker Buehler and Game 2 winner Stephen Strasburg. The Dodgers jumped on Strasburg in the bottom of the first with a double by Joc Pederson followed by a two-run home run from Max Muncy, his third of the series. Kiké Hernández hit a homer in the second to extend the lead to three. The Nationals got on the scoreboard in the sixth inning when Juan Soto singled to score Anthony Rendon. Strasburg pitched six innings, with three runs on six hits and one walk and seven strikeouts while Buehler pitched 6 2/3 innings, allowing one run on four hits, three walks and a hit batsman while striking out seven. Back-to-back home runs in the eighth by Rendon and Juan Soto off Clayton Kershaw tied the game. With a scoreless ninth inning, the game went to extra innings, the first NLDS Game 5 to do so since 2011. Howie Kendrick hit a grand slam off of Joe Kelly in the top of the tenth inning to give the Nationals a 7–3 lead. Sean Doolittle set down the Dodgers in order in the bottom of the tenth, getting Justin Turner to fly out to Michael A. Taylor for the third out; the Dodgers called for a video review, but the call was upheld and it ended the series. The Nationals advanced to the NLCS, while the Dodgers' two-year reign as NL champions was over and their 31st straight year without a title. This was the third straight year and fourth time in the last five years the Dodgers were eliminated from the postseason at home, and was also the first time the Dodgers were eliminated from the NLDS since 2015. As a result of the NLDS Game 5 loss, the Dodgers became the first team to win 105+ games in a season to not advance to the LCS since the Division Series was introduced. This was also just the third LDS winner-take-all Game 5 to go into extra innings. For the Washington Nationals, after several NLDS exits, they advanced to the NLCS for the first time since 1981 when they were based in Montreal as the Expos.

Charley Steiner, fan of the Dodgers since the Brooklyn days and long time radio play-by-play announcer, said after the final out that this was one of the Dodgers’ most devastating losses in their 129-year history.

=== Composite line score ===
2019 NLDS (3–2): Washington Nationals beat Los Angeles Dodgers

Team	1	2	3	4	5	6	7	8	9	10	R	H	E
Washington Nationals	3	2	1	0	4	4	0	3	0	4	21	37	3
Los Angeles Dodgers	4	1	0	0	2	8	1	2	4	0	22	38	2
Total attendance: 240,610 Average attendance: 48,122

== Atlanta vs. St. Louis ==
This was the fifth postseason meeting between the Braves and Cardinals. The previous four match-ups were the 1982 National League Championship Series, the 1996 National League Championship Series, the 2000 National League Division Series and 2012 National League Wild Card Game. The Cardinals were 3–1 in those previous meetings.

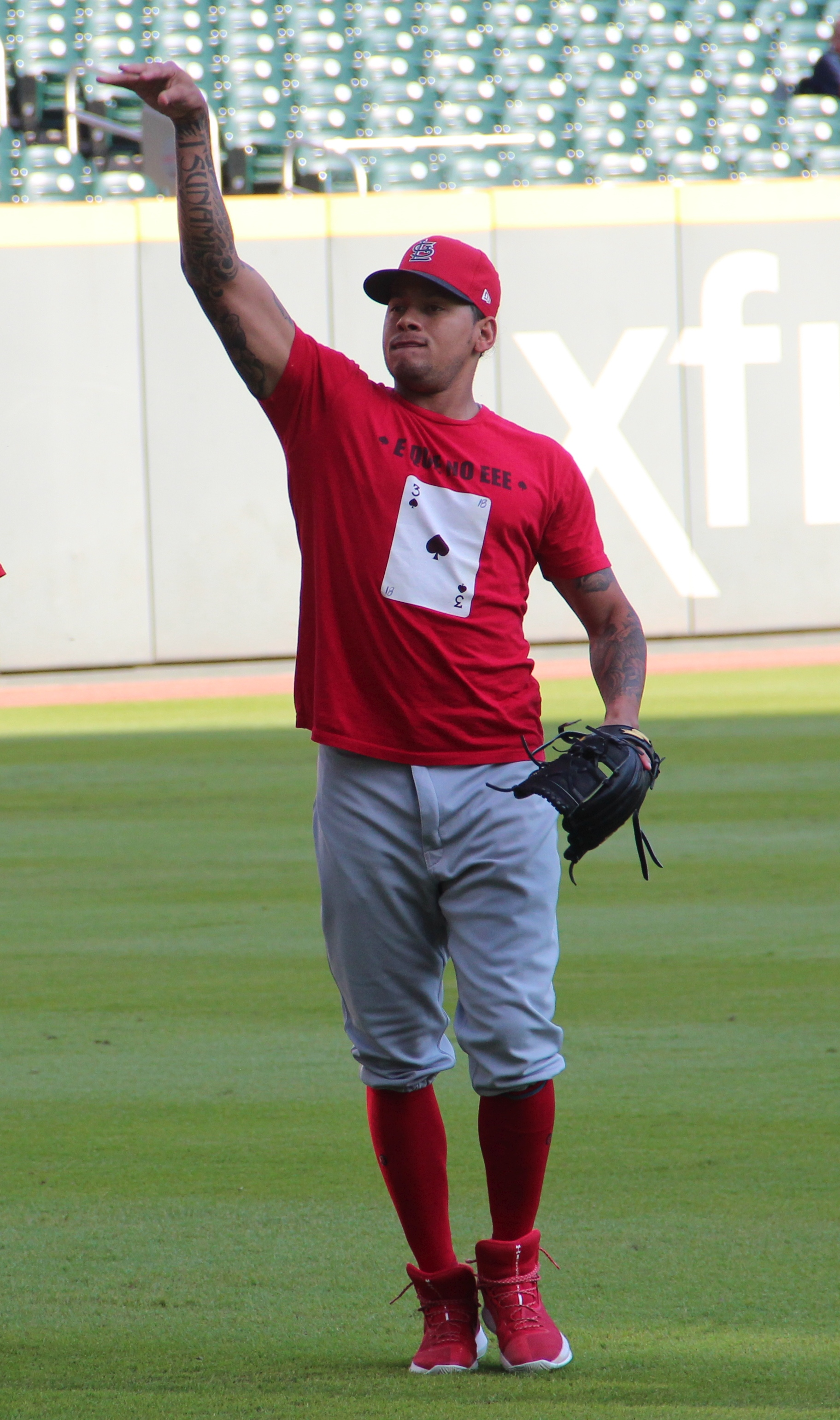
Game 1 winning pitcher Carlos Martínez

=== Game 1 ===
October 3, 2019 5:02 pm (EDT) at SunTrust Park in Cumberland, Georgia, 94 °F (34 °C), clear
Team	1	2	3	4	5	6	7	8	9	R	H	E
St. Louis	0	0	0	0	1	0	0	2	4	7	14	2
Atlanta	1	0	0	0	0	2	0	0	3	6	9	0
WP: Carlos Martínez (1–0) LP: Mark Melancon (0–1); Home runs: STL: Paul Goldschmidt (1); ATL: Ronald Acuña Jr. (1), Freddie Freeman (1); Attendance: 42,631; Boxscore

The Cardinals tabbed Miles Mikolas, who led the National League in losses, to start Game 1. He was opposed by left-hander Dallas Keuchel. The Braves quickly got to work against Mikolas, with Ronald Acuña Jr. and Ozzie Albies both drawing walks and Freddie Freeman singling to load the bases. Josh Donaldson then hit a ground ball to second baseman Kolten Wong. It looked like an easy double play, but Wong could not field the ball cleanly, allowing Acuña to score. Dallas Keuchel kept the Cardinals bats quiet until the fifth inning when Harrison Bader singled to lead off the inning, moved to second on a sacrifice bunt and stole third base. Dexter Fowler hit a ground ball out that scored Bader from third base to tie the game 1–1. Tommy Edman would then double and move Fowler to third and Keuchel was relieved by Darren O'Day, who got Paul Goldschmidt to line out to shortstop Dansby Swanson. The Braves would retake the lead on a Donaldson hit by pitch, a Nick Markakis double, and Tyler Webb intentionally walked Adam Duvall, who was pinch hitting for Matt Joyce. One out later, Swanson singled in two runs on a ground ball to shortstop Paul DeJong that was deflected by Edman's glove. Chris Martin came out the bullpen, but did not throw a pitch as he left with an oblique injury, and was replaced by Luke Jackson. Jackson allowed a solo home run to Goldschmidt to cut the lead to one. Matt Carpenter tied the game up with a bloop single that scored DeJong. The Cardinals would break the tie in the ninth with four runs off Braves closer Mark Melancon, with Ozuna doubling home Fowler and Edman and Wong doubling home Goldschmidt and Ozuna which made it 7–3. The Braves rallied off of closer Carlos Martínez with Ronald Acuña hitting a two-run home run and Freeman hitting a monstrous shot to dead center field. Martínez would end the rally though, getting Donaldson to ground out and striking out Markakis to seal the Game 1 victory for St. Louis.

=== Game 2 ===
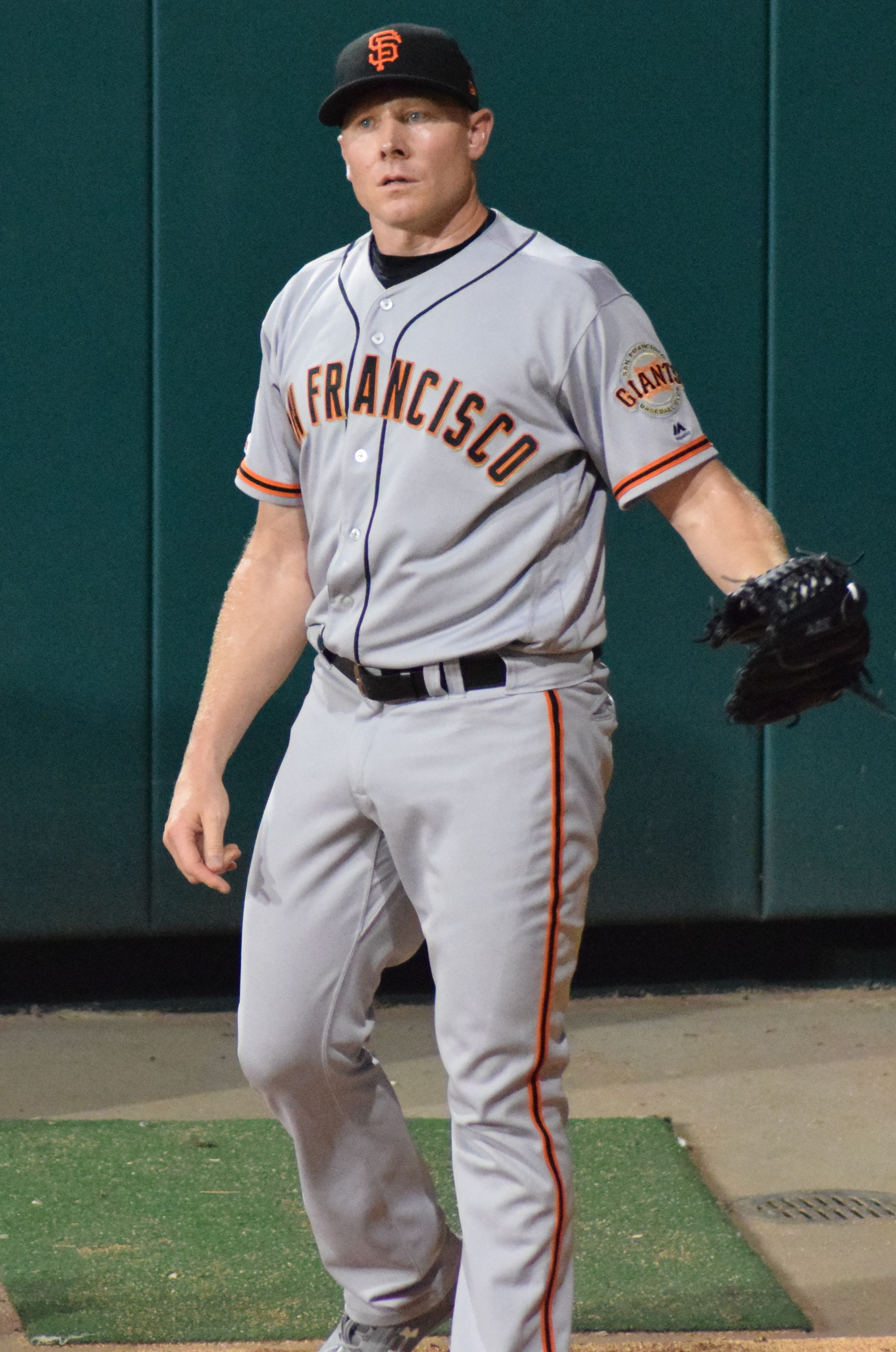
Mark Melancon earned a save in Game 2

October 4, 2019 4:37 pm (EDT) at SunTrust Park in Cumberland, Georgia, 95 °F (35 °C), sunny
Team	1	2	3	4	5	6	7	8	9	R	H	E
St. Louis	0	0	0	0	0	0	0	0	0	0	6	0
Atlanta	1	0	0	0	0	0	2	0	X	3	8	1
WP: Mike Foltynewicz (1–0) LP: Jack Flaherty (0–1) Sv: Mark Melancon (1); Home runs: STL: None; ATL: Adam Duvall (1); Attendance: 42,911; Boxscore

Jack Flaherty, who was the Cardinals ace for the second half, got the ball for Game 2, and was opposed by right-hander Mike Foltynewicz. Like Game 1, the Braves got to work quickly against Flaherty, with an Albies infield hit, a wild pitch and an RBI single from Donaldson. Foltynewicz would shut down the Cardinals bats, holding them to three hits over seven innings of work. Duvall provided insurance with a two-run home run off Flaherty in the seventh. Melancon, who was the Game 1 loser, came in the game in the ninth for the save and allowed two one-out singles to Goldschmidt and Ozuna. Melancon would work out of trouble though, striking out Yadier Molina and Wong to end the game and send the series to St. Louis tied at one game each.

=== Game 3 ===
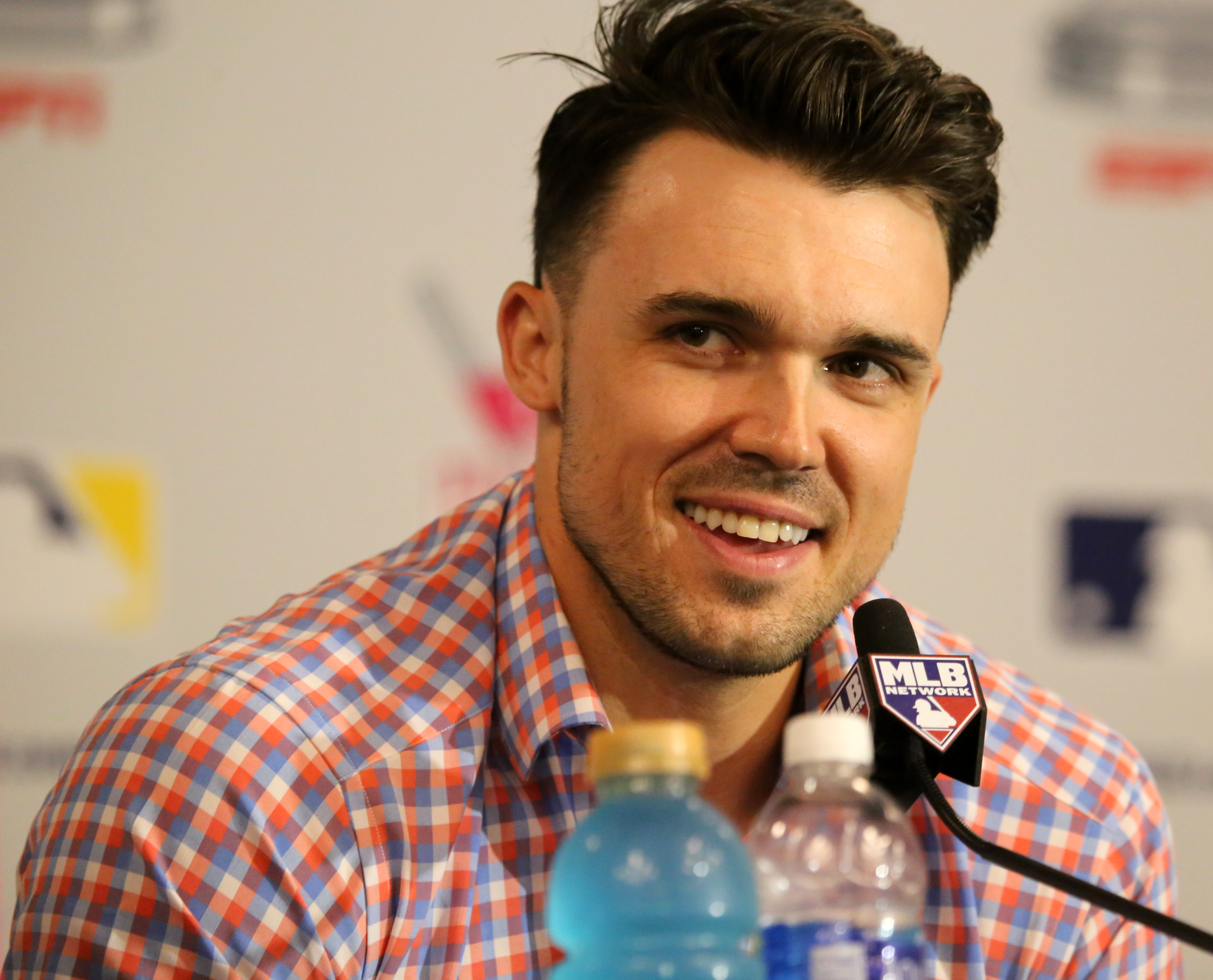
Adam Duvall had two ninth-inning RBIs in Game 3.

October 6, 2019 3:10 pm (CDT) at Busch Stadium in St. Louis, Missouri, 63 °F (17 °C), cloudy
Team	1	2	3	4	5	6	7	8	9	R	H	E
Atlanta	0	0	0	0	0	0	0	0	3	3	7	0
St. Louis	0	1	0	0	0	0	0	0	0	1	4	0
WP: Sean Newcomb (1–0) LP: Carlos Martínez (1–1) Sv: Mark Melancon (2); Attendance: 46,701; Boxscore

Game 3 featured a pitching matchup of Adam Wainwright for the Cardinals and Mike Soroka for the visiting Braves. St. Louis took an early 1–0 lead, as Marcell Ozuna had a second-inning double then scored following a ground out and sacrifice fly. Soroka went seven innings, allowing just one run and two hits, while striking out seven. Wainwright went 7 2/3 innings, allowing no runs on four hits, and striking out eight. There was no further scoring until the top of the ninth, when St. Louis brought in closer Carlos Martínez. Following a double, two strikeouts, and an intentional walk, Dansby Swanson doubled, scoring one run and placing runners on second and third. Adam Duvall then hit an 0–2 pitch for a single, driving in two runs. A walk and a line out ended the rally with Atlanta ahead, 3–1. Braves closer Mark Melancon allowed one hit in the bottom of the ninth but otherwise shut down the Cardinals to earn his second save of the series, as Atlanta took a 2–1 series lead. This was Atlanta's first playoff win after trailing in the ninth inning or later since Game 6 of the 1999 NLCS against the Mets. This was also the first postseason series lead the Braves have held since taking a 2–1 series lead against the San Francisco Giants in the 2002 NLDS.

=== Game 4 ===
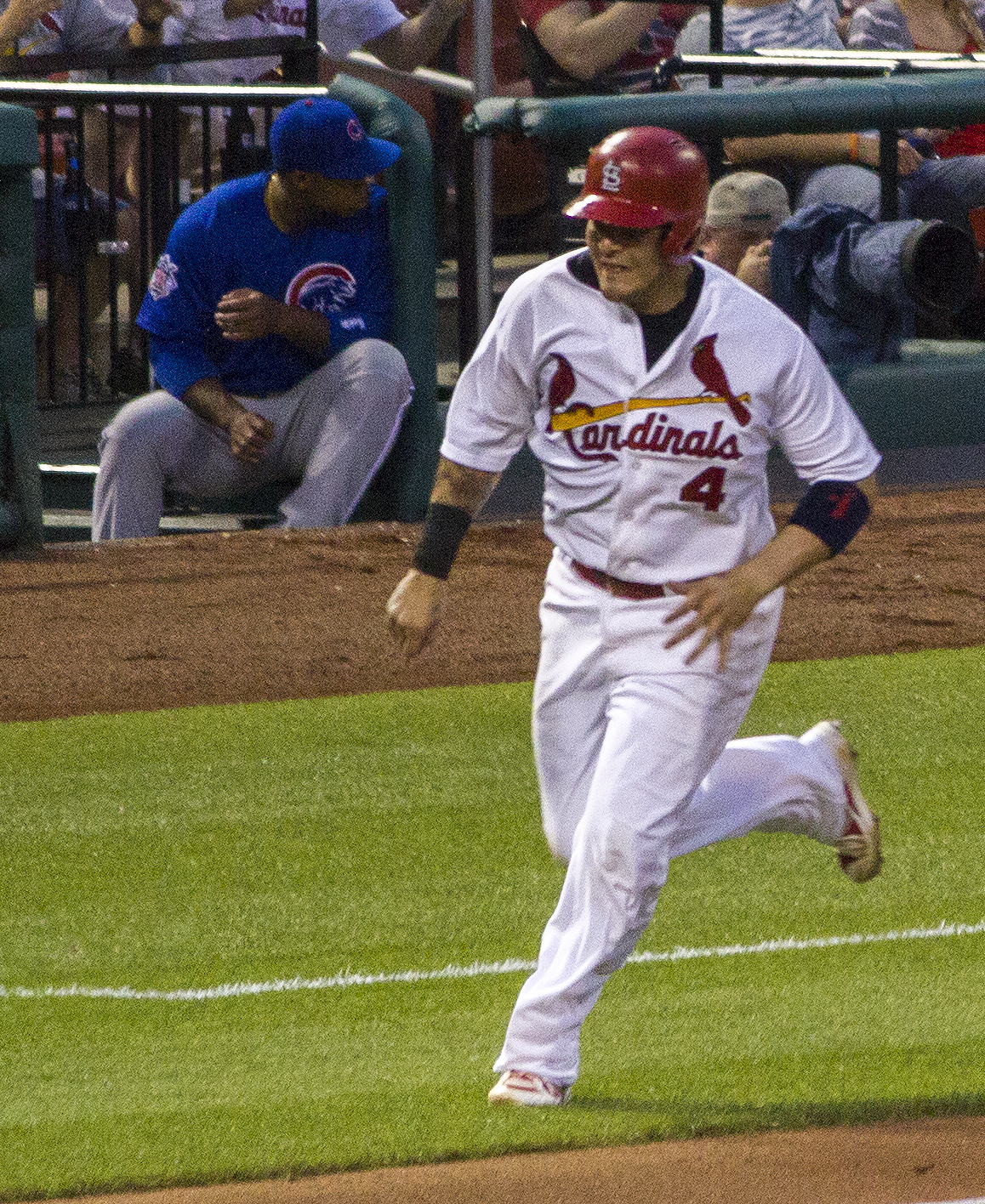
Yadier Molina tied Game 4 with an eighth-inning RBI single and later hit a walk-off sacrifice fly.

October 7, 2019 2:07 pm (CDT) at Busch Stadium in St. Louis, Missouri, 72 °F (22 °C), sunny
Team	1	2	3	4	5	6	7	8	9	10	R	H	E
Atlanta	0	0	1	0	3	0	0	0	0	0	4	8	1
St. Louis	2	0	0	1	0	0	0	1	0	1	5	9	1
WP: Miles Mikolas (1–0) LP: Julio Teherán (0–1); Home runs: ATL: Ozzie Albies (1); STL: Paul Goldschmidt (2), Marcell Ozuna 2 (2); Attendance: 42,203; Boxscore

Dakota Hudson got the ball for St. Louis to try to send the series back to Atlanta for a Game 5. His mound opponent was Game 1 starter Dallas Keuchel, who held the Cardinals to one run over 4 2/3 in Game 1. The Cardinals got to Keuchel early this time, hitting back to back home runs by Paul Goldschmidt and Marcell Ozuna. The Braves chipped away at the deficit when Ozzie Albies hit a sacrifice fly to get the Braves on the board. Ozuna homered again in the fourth inning to get the run back for the Cardinals. However, in the fifth inning, Hudson ran into trouble as Dansby Swanson doubled with one out and Adam Duvall reached on a fielding error by Matt Carpenter. One out later, Albies hit a two-run home run to put the Braves ahead 4–3 and chased starter Dakota Hudson from the game. The Cardinals would rally to tie the game in the eighth when Goldschmidt doubled with one out and scored on a Yadier Molina single that just got by the leaping Freddie Freeman. The Cardinals would win it in the bottom of the tenth, when Kolten Wong doubled to lead off the inning, Goldschmidt was intentionally walked, Ozuna grounded into a forceplay and Molina, who tied it in the eighth inning, walked it off with a sacrifice fly that scored Wong and sent the Cardinals back to Atlanta for a Game 5.

=== Game 5 ===
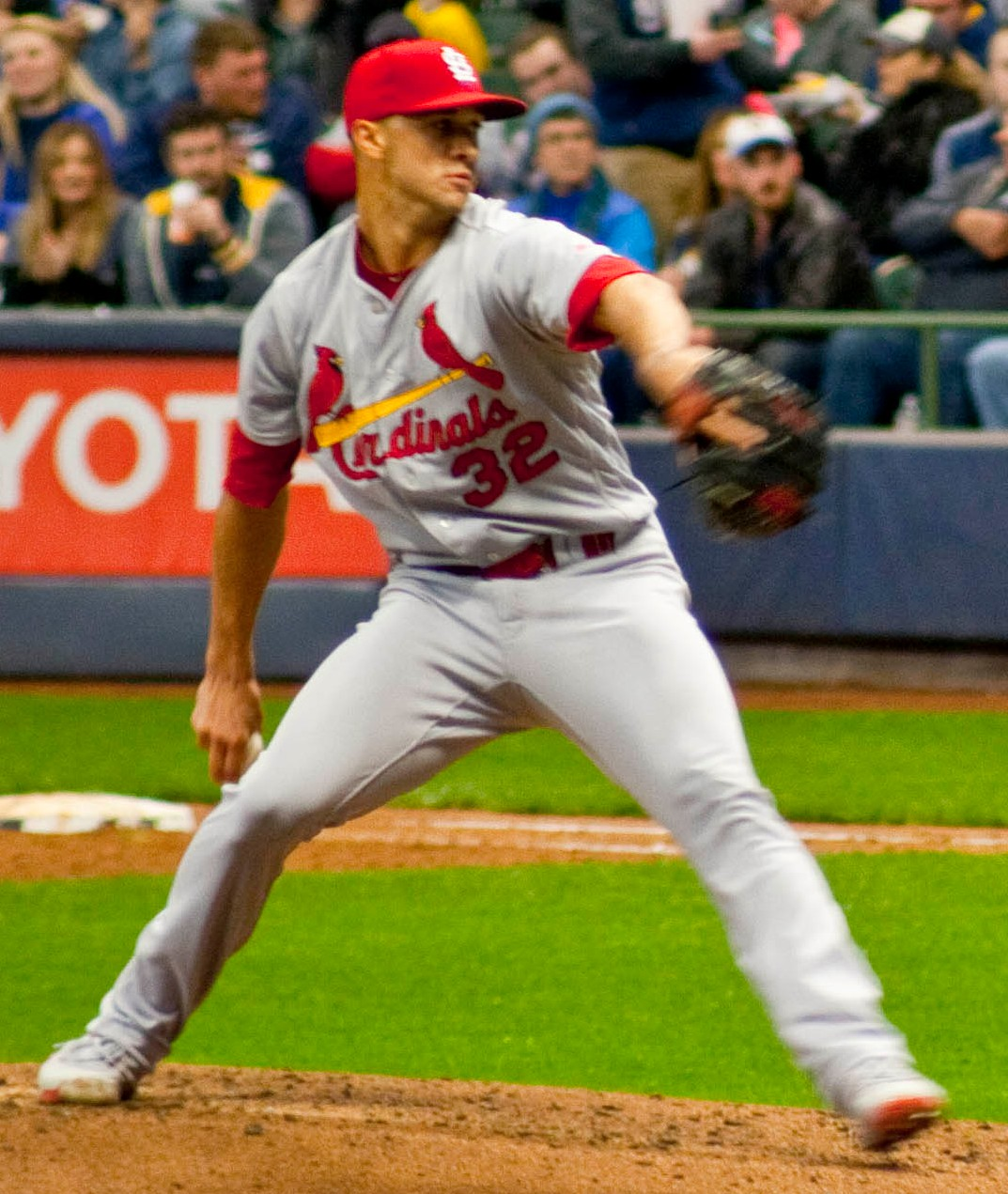
Jack Flaherty held Atlanta to one run on four hits in six innings, earning the win in Game 5.

October 9, 2019 5:02 pm (EDT) at SunTrust Park in Cumberland, Georgia, 73 °F (23 °C), partly cloudy
Team	1	2	3	4	5	6	7	8	9	R	H	E
St. Louis	10	1	2	0	0	0	0	0	0	13	11	0
Atlanta	0	0	0	1	0	0	0	0	0	1	6	2
WP: Jack Flaherty (1–1) LP: Mike Foltynewicz (1–1); Home runs: STL: None; ATL: Josh Donaldson (1); Attendance: 43,122; Boxscore

This was the first NLDS Game 5 between Atlanta and St. Louis. Atlanta entered the game 0–3 in prior NLDS Game 5 appearances, all the losses occurring at home, while St. Louis was 3–1. Atlanta starting pitcher Mike Foltynewicz lasted only 1/3 of an inning, leaving after allowing three hits and three walks (one intentional); he was charged with seven runs (six earned). The Cardinals' ten runs in the first inning set a Major League Baseball record for first-inning runs in a postseason game, and tied the Major League Baseball record for the most runs in any inning in a postseason game. St. Louis added a run in the second and two in the third, while a Josh Donaldson home run got Atlanta on the board in the fourth. Jack Flaherty went six innings; striking out eight to earn the win. With no further scoring, the Cardinals advanced to the NLCS via a 13–1 final score, as Génesis Cabrera struck out Dansby Swanson swinging to end the series. It was the Braves' 24th straight year without a title.

Atlanta catcher Brian McCann announced his retirement following Game 5.

=== Composite line score ===
2019 NLDS (3–2): St. Louis Cardinals beat Atlanta Braves

Team	1	2	3	4	5	6	7	8	9	10	R	H	E
St. Louis Cardinals	12	2	2	1	1	0	0	3	4	1	26	44	3
Atlanta Braves	2	0	1	1	3	2	2	0	3	0	14	38	4
Total attendance: 217,568 Average attendance: 43,514

== See also ==
- 2019 American League Division Series
