= 2019 Atlanta Braves season =

2019 Atlanta Braves
- National League East champions
- League: National League
- Division: East
- Ballpark: SunTrust Park
- City: Atlanta
- Record: 97–65 (.599)
- Divisional place: 1st
- Owners: Liberty Media/John Malone
- General managers: Alex Anthopoulos
- Managers: Brian Snitker
- Television: Fox Sports Southeast; Fox Sports South (Chip Caray, Jeff Francoeur, Tom Glavine, Paul Byrd, Joe Simpson)
- Radio: 680 The Fan; Rock 100.5; Atlanta Braves Radio Network (Jim Powell, Joe Simpson)

The 2019 Atlanta Braves season was the Braves' 54th season in Atlanta, 149th overall, and third season at SunTrust Park. The Braves clinched a playoff spot for the second consecutive year on September 14. They clinched their second consecutive National League East championship on September 20 but lost to the St. Louis Cardinals in the NLDS. On October 9, they became the first team to allow 10 runs in the first inning of an MLB playoff game, essentially clinching their tenth straight postseason series loss.

== Offseason ==
=== October 2018 ===
- On October 29, Ryan Flaherty, Brad Brach, Rene Rivera, Kurt Suzuki, Brandon McCarthy, Aníbal Sánchez, Peter Moylan, Nick Markakis, and Lucas Duda elected free agency.

=== November 2018 ===
- On November 1, the Braves acquired Raffy Lopez for cash considerations.
- On November 20, the Braves selected the contracts of Alex Jackson, Jacob Webb, Patrick Weigel, and Huascar Ynoa.
- On November 26, the Braves signed Brian McCann to a 1-year, $2 million contract.
- On November 26, the Braves signed Josh Donaldson to a 1-year, $23 million contract.

=== January 2019 ===
- On January 22, the Braves re-signed Nick Markakis to a 1-year $6 million contract.

=== March 2019 ===
- On March 23, the Braves acquired Matt Joyce from the San Francisco Giants for cash considerations.

== Regular season ==
=== April 2019 ===
- On April 2, 2019, Ronald Acuña Jr and the Braves agreed to an eight-year contract worth $100 million. The extension included team options for the 2027 and 2028 seasons. Aged 21, Acuña became the youngest player in baseball history to sign a contract worth at least $100 million. Acuña's deal was the largest for any player with less than one year of major league service. By June 2019, Acuña had drawn attention for his power production.
- On April 11, 2019, Ozzie Albies signed a seven-year, $35 million extension to remain with the Braves. The deal includes options for the 2026 and 2027 seasons. Both years are worth $7 million with a $4 million buyout.
- On April 28, the Braves acquired Jerry Blevins from the Oakland Athletics for cash considerations.

=== May 2019 ===
- On May 20, the Braves acquired Anthony Swarzak and cash considerations from the Seattle Mariners in exchange for Arodys Vizcaíno and Jesse Biddle.

=== June 2019 ===
- On June 7, the Braves signed free agent Dallas Keuchel to a one-year deal worth $13 million.

=== July 2019 ===
- On July 24, Shane Carle was designated for assignment and in a subsequent move the Braves added Jeremy Walker to the roster. The next day Carle was traded to the Texas Rangers for cash consideration.
- On July 30, the Braves traded minor league pitcher Kolby Allard to the Texas Rangers in exchange for Chris Martin.
- On July 31, the Braves traded Dan Winkler and Tristan Beck to the San Francisco Giants in exchange for Mark Melancon.
- On July 31, the Braves traded Joey Wentz and Travis Demeritte to the Detroit Tigers in exchange for Shane Greene.

=== August 2019 ===
- On August 5, the Cincinnati Reds claimed pitcher Kevin Gausman off waivers.
- On August 15, the Braves added Adeiny Hechavarria due to an injury to starting shortstop Dansby Swanson and ineffectiveness from his replacements.
- On August 19, the Braves claimed outfielder Billy Hamilton off of waivers from the Kansas City Royals.
- On August 24, the Braves signed catcher Francisco Cervelli to add catching depth while Brian McCann is injured.
- On August 24, Ronald Acuna Jr. joined the 30/30 club (36 home runs and 30 stolen bases). Acuna was the first Brave to accomplish this feat since 1991. Acuna joins Hank Aaron (1963), Dale Murphy (1983) and Ron Gant (1990 and ’91) as the only Braves players to produce a 30-30 season. Acuna accomplished this feat through 130 team games, making him the fastest in franchise history to do so.

=== September 2019 ===
- On September 5, the Braves activated relief pitcher Darren O'Day from the 60-day injured list and added him to the active roster along with Adam Duvall. O'Day was acquired from the Baltimore Orioles at the 2018 trade deadline but did not pitch for the Braves during the 2018 season due to a hamstring injury. O'Day had been sidelined for most of the 2019 season after experiencing right forearm discomfort during a spring training outing. To make room on the roster Alex Jackson was recalled from Gwinnett and placed on the 60-day injured list.
- On September 14, the Braves beat the Washington Nationals 10-1 clinching a playoff berth and decreasing their magic number to four. In a scary moment during the game Charlie Culberson had squared around to bunt when a pitch from Fernando Rodney struck him in the face. Culberson was unable to continue in the game and had to be taken to the hospital. He would not return for the remainder of the season.
- On September 19, Ronald Acuna hit his 40th home run against Aaron Nola and the Philadelphia Phillies. At 21 years-old Acuna is the youngest person ever to hit 40 home runs and steal 30 bases. Acuna has 37 stolen bases on the year needing only three more to reach the 40/40 club. The Braves went on to win the game and decrease their magic number to win the National League East to one game.
- On September 20, the Atlanta Braves clinched their 20th divisional title, capturing the NL East, and tying the MLB record for most divisional titles in the league, tied with the Yankees. The Yankees clinched their 20th divisional title on September 19, 2019. In capturing the division, Mike Foltynewicz pitched eight shutout innings in a 6-0 triumph over the San Francisco Giants, which eliminated them from the postseason.

== Regular season ==
=== Game log ===
2019 Game Log: 97–65 (Home: 50–31; Away: 47–34)
March/April: 14–15 (Home: 9–9; Away: 5–6)

#	Date	Opponent	Score	Win	Loss	Save	Stadium	Attendance	Record	Box/Streak
1	March 28	@ Phillies	4–10	Nola (1–0)	**Teherán** (0–1)	—	Citizens Bank Park	44,469	0–1	L1
2	March 30	@ Phillies	6–8	Morgan (1–0)	**Parsons** (0–1)	—	Citizens Bank Park	44,597	0–2	L2
3	March 31	@ Phillies	1–5	Arrieta (1–0)	**Wright** (0–1)	—	Citizens Bank Park	41,410	0–3	L3
4	April 1	Cubs	8–0	**Parsons** (1–1)	Hendricks (0–1)	—	**SunTrust Park**	41,912	1–3	W1
5	April 3	Cubs	6–4	**Jackson** (1–0)	Cishek (0–1)	**Vizcaíno** (1)	**SunTrust Park**	37,398	2–3	W2
6	April 4	Cubs	9–4	**Fried** (1–0)	Darvish (0–1)	—	**SunTrust Park**	33,815	3–3	W3
7	April 5	Marlins	4–0	**Gausman** (1–0)	López (0–1)	—	**SunTrust Park**	29,218	4–3	W4
8	April 6	Marlins	4–2	Romo (1–0)	**Minter** (0–1)	Conley (1)	**SunTrust Park**	35,618	4–4	L1
9	April 7	Marlins	4–3	**Vizcaíno** (1–0)	Conley (0–1)	—	**SunTrust Park**	32,551	5–4	W1
10	April 8	@ Rockies	8–6	**Teherán** (1–1)	Freeland (1–2)	**Minter** (1)	Coors Field	25,199	6–4	W2
11	April 9	@ Rockies	7–1	**Fried** (2–0)	Márquez (1–1)	—	Coors Field	26,124	7–4	W3
—	April 10	@ Rockies	Postponed (snow); rescheduled for August 26							
12	April 11	Mets	3–6	Matz (1–0)	**Gausman** (1–1)	Díaz (5)	**SunTrust Park**	24,015	7–5	L1
13	April 12	Mets	2–6	Wheeler (1–1)	**Wright** (0–2)	—	**SunTrust Park**	33,334	7–6	L2
14	April 13	Mets	11–7	**Toussaint** (1-0)	Oswalt (0-1)	—	**SunTrust Park**	40,117	8–6	W1
15	April 14	Mets	7–3	**Teherán** (2–1)	De Grom (2–2)	—	**SunTrust Park**	23,385	9–6	W2
16	April 16	Diamondbacks	6–9	Hirano (1–1)	**Minter** (0–2)	Holland (3)	**SunTrust Park**	22,407	9–7	L1
17	April 17	Diamondbacks	2–3 (10)	Bradley (1–1)	**Biddle** (0–1)	Holland (4)	**SunTrust Park**	22,356	9–8	L2
18	April 18	Diamondbacks	1–4	Weaver (1–1)	**Soroka** (0–1)	Hirano (1)	**SunTrust Park**	24,193	9–9	L3
—	April 19	@ Indians	Postponed (rain); rescheduled for April 20							
19	April 20 (1)	@ Indians	4–8	Kluber (2–2)	**Teherán** (2–2)	—	Progressive Field	23,035	9–10	L4
20	April 20 (2)	@ Indians	8–7	**Jackson** (2–0)	Cimber (1–1)	**Minter** (2)	Progressive Field	23,035	10–10	W1
21	April 21	@ Indians	11–5	**Fried** (3–0)	Bieber (2–1)	—	Progressive Field	16,039	11–10	W2
22	April 23	@ Reds	6–7	Stephenson (2–0)	**Gausman** (1–2)	Iglesias (5)	Great American Ball Park	12,789	11–11	L1
23	April 24	@ Reds	3–1	**Soroka** (1–1)	Roark (1–1)	**Minter** (3)	Great American Ball Park	12,949	12–11	W1
24	April 25	@ Reds	2–4	Castillo (3–1)	**Teherán** (2–3)	Iglesias (6)	Great American Ball Park	14,792	12–12	L1
25	April 26	Rockies	4–8	Senzatela (2–1)	**Fried** (3–1)	Davis (4)	**SunTrust Park**	40,282	12–13	L2
26	April 27	Rockies	5–9	Shaw (1–0)	**Minter** (0–3)	—	**SunTrust Park**	38,243	12–14	L3
27	April 28	Rockies	8–7	**Webb** (1–0)	Oh (1–1)	**Jackson** (1)	**SunTrust Park**	33,919	13–14	W1
28	April 29	Padres	3–1	**Soroka** (2–1)	Margevicius (2–3)	**Webb** (1)	**SunTrust Park**	19,353	14–14	W2
29	April 30	Padres	3–4	Paddack (2–1)	**Teherán** (2–4)	Yates (14)	**SunTrust Park**	18,626	14–15	L1

May: 16–12 (Home: 5–6; Away: 11–6)

#	Date	Opponent	Score	Win	Loss	Save	Stadium	Attendance	Record	Box/Streak
30	May 1	Padres	5–1	**Fried** (4–1)	Quantrill (0–1)	—	**SunTrust Park**	20,394	15–15	W1
31	May 2	Padres	2–11	Strahm (1–2)	**Foltynewicz** (0–1)	—	**SunTrust Park**	23,746	15–16	L1
32	May 3	@ Marlins	7–2	**Toussaint** (2-0)	Ureña (1–5)	—	Marlins Park	7,198	16–16	W1
33	May 4	@ Marlins	9–2	**Soroka** (3–1)	Anderson (0–1)	—	Marlins Park	10,229	17–16	W2
34	May 5	@ Marlins	3–1 (10)	**Tomlin** (1–0)	Guerrero (1–1)	**Jackson** (2)	Marlins Park	11,885	18–16	W3
35	May 6	@ Dodgers	3–5	Buehler (4–0)	**Gausman** (1–3)	Urías (1)	Dodger Stadium	43,393	18–17	L1
36	May 7	@ Dodgers	0–9	Ryu (4–1)	**Fried** (4–2)	—	Dodger Stadium	47,337	18–18	L2
37	May 8	@ Dodgers	4–9	Kershaw (2–0)	**Foltynewicz** (0–2)	—	Dodger Stadium	53,707	18–19	L3
38	May 9	@ Diamondbacks	2–3 (10)	Duplantier (1–0)	**Minter** (0–4)	—	Chase Field	17,751	18–20	L4
39	May 10	@ Diamondbacks	2–1	**Winkler** (1–0)	López (0–1)	**Jackson** (3)	Chase Field	21,932	19–20	W1
40	May 11	@ Diamondbacks	6–4	**Gausman** (2–3)	Kelly (3–4)	**Venters** (1)	Chase Field	33,168	20–20	W2
41	May 12	@ Diamondbacks	5–3	**Fried** (5–2)	Godley (1–3)	**Jackson** (4)	Chase Field	27,460	21–20	W3
42	May 14	Cardinals	3–14	Flaherty (4–3)	**Foltynewicz** (0–3)	—	**SunTrust Park**	23,718	21–21	L1
43	May 15	Cardinals	4–0	**Soroka** (4–1)	Wacha (3–1)	**Jackson** (5)	**SunTrust Park**	23,367	22–21	W1
44	May 16	Cardinals	10–2	**Teherán** (3–4)	Wainwright (3–4)	—	**SunTrust Park**	28,783	23–21	W2
45	May 17	Brewers	12–8	**Fried** (6–2)	Chacín (3–5)	**Jackson** (6)	**SunTrust Park**	36,222	24–21	W3
46	May 18	Brewers	4–3 (10)	**Webb** (2–0)	Hader (0–3)	—	**SunTrust Park**	39,121	25–21	W4
47	May 19	Brewers	2–3 (10)	Hader (1–3)	**Parsons** (1–2)	—	**SunTrust Park**	36,548	25–22	L1
48	May 20	@ Giants	4–1	**Soroka** (5–1)	Suarez (0–1)	**Newcomb** (1)	Oracle Park	29,815	26–22	W1
49	May 21	@ Giants	3–4	Gott (2–0)	**Jackson** (2–1)	—	Oracle Park	28,030	26–23	L1
50	May 22	@ Giants	9–2	**Fried** (7–2)	Samardzija (2–3)	—	Oracle Park	31,042	27–23	W1
51	May 23	@ Giants	5–4 (13)	**Jackson** (3–1)	Moronta (1–4)	—	Oracle Park	32,463	28–23	W2
52	May 24	@ Cardinals	5–2	**Foltynewicz** (1–3)	Mikolas (4–5)	—	Busch Stadium	44,630	29–23	W3
53	May 25	@ Cardinals	3–6	Miller (2–2)	**Winkler** (1–1)	Hicks (10)	Busch Stadium	45,760	29–24	L1
54	May 26	@ Cardinals	4–3	**Webb** (3–0)	Webb (0–1)	**Jackson** (7)	Busch Stadium	45,152	30–24	W1
55	May 28	Nationals	4–5	Strasburg (5–3)	**Fried** (7–3)	Doolittle (10)	**SunTrust Park**	27,573	30–25	L1
56	May 29	Nationals	4–14	Sánchez (1–6)	**Gausman** (2–4)	McGowin (1)	**SunTrust Park**	37,726	30–26	L2
57	May 31	Tigers	2–8	Turnbull (3–4)	**Foltynewicz** (1–4)	—	**SunTrust Park**	35,524	30–27	L3

June: 20–8 (Home: 10–2; Away: 10–6)

#	Date	Opponent	Score	Win	Loss	Save	Stadium	Attendance	Record	Box/Streak
58	June 1	Tigers	10–5	**Soroka** (6–1)	Norris (2–4)	**Jackson** (8)	**SunTrust Park**	37,108	31–27	W1
59	June 2	Tigers	7–4	**Toussaint** (3–0)	Jiménez (2–3)	—	**SunTrust Park**	28,978	32–27	W2
60	June 4	@ Pirates	12–5	**Winkler** (2–1)	Crick (2–2)	—	PNC Park	13,963	33–27	W3
61	June 5	@ Pirates	4–7	Musgrove (4–6)	**Gausman** (2–5)	—	PNC Park	13,904	33–28	L1
62	June 6	@ Pirates	1–6	Archer (3–5)	**Foltynewicz** (1–5)	Vázquez (15)	PNC Park	18,232	33–29	L2
63	June 7	@ Marlins	7–1	**Soroka** (7–1)	Ureña (4–7)	—	Marlins Park	8,589	34–29	W1
64	June 8	@ Marlins	1–0	**Teherán** (4–4)	Richards (3–6)	**Jackson** (9)	Marlins Park	9,771	35–29	W2
65	June 9	@ Marlins	7–6 (12)	**Winkler** (3–1)	Conley (1–6)	**Tomlin** (1)	Marlins Park	10,959	36–29	W3
66	June 10	Pirates	13–7	**Newcomb** (1–0)	McRae (0–2)	**Webb** (2)	**SunTrust Park**	21,822	37–29	W4
67	June 11	Pirates	7–5 (8)	**Toussaint** (4–0)	Archer (3–6)	**Swarzak** (4)	**SunTrust Park**	31,305	38–29	W5
68	June 12	Pirates	8–7 (11)	**Webb** (4–0)	Feliz (2–3)	—	**SunTrust Park**	24,428	39–29	W6
69	June 13	Pirates	6–5	**Teherán** (5–4)	Musgrove (4–7)	**Jackson** (10)	**SunTrust Park**	35,108	40–29	W7
70	June 14	Phillies	9–8	**Blevins** (1–0)	Neris (1–3)	—	**SunTrust Park**	41,975	41–29	W8
71	June 15	Phillies	5–6	Ramos (1–0)	**Jackson** (3–2)	Neris (15)	**SunTrust Park**	43,593	41–30	L1
72	June 16	Phillies	15–1	**Foltynewicz** (2–5)	Velasquez (2–4)	—	**SunTrust Park**	40,855	42–30	W1
73	June 17	Mets	12–3	**Soroka** (8–1)	Wheeler (5–5)	—	**SunTrust Park**	24,660	43–30	W2
74	June 18	Mets	2–10	deGrom (4–6)	**Teherán** (5–5)	—	**SunTrust Park**	24,791	43–31	L1
75	June 19	Mets	7–2	**Fried** (8–3)	Matz (5–5)	—	**SunTrust Park**	37,104	44–31	W1
76	June 21	@ Nationals	3–4	Strasburg (8–4)	**Keuchel** (0–1)	Suero (1)	Nationals Park	34,212	44–32	L1
77	June 22	@ Nationals	13–9	**Minter** (1–4)	Ross (0–1)	—	Nationals Park	37,492	45–32	W1
78	June 23	@ Nationals	4–3 (10)	**Minter** (2–4)	Rainey (1–2)	**Jackson** (11)	Nationals Park	34,256	46–32	W2
79	June 24	@ Cubs	3–8	Lester (7–5)	**Teherán** (5–6)	—	Wrigley Field	37,603	46–33	L1
80	June 25	@ Cubs	3–2	**Fried** (9–3)	Montgomery (1–2)	**Jackson** (12)	Wrigley Field	37,333	47–33	W1
81	June 26	@ Cubs	5–3	**Keuchel** (1–1)	Darvish (2–4)	**Minter** (4)	Wrigley Field	38,017	48–33	W2
82	June 27	@ Cubs	7–9	Chatwood (4–1)	**Tomlin** (1–1)	Kimbrel (1)	Wrigley Field	39,823	48–34	L1
83	June 28	@ Mets	6-2	**Soroka** (9-1)	deGrom (4–7)	—	Citi Field	36,421	49-34	W1
84	June 29	@ Mets	5–4	**Newcomb** (2–0)	Lugo (3–2)	**Jackson** (13)	Citi Field	40,809	50–34	W2
85	June 30	@ Mets	5–8	Font (2–2)	**Newcomb** (2–1)	Díaz (17)	Citi Field	31,743	50–35	L1

July: 14–10 (Home: 6–6; Away: 8–4)

#	Date	Opponent	Score	Win	Loss	Save	Stadium	Attendance	Record	Box/Streak
86	July 2	Phillies	0–2	Nola (7–2)	**Keuchel** (1–2)	Neris (17)	**SunTrust Park**	40,180	50–36	L2
87	July 3	Phillies	9–2	**Wilson** (1–0)	Pivetta (4–3)	—	**SunTrust Park**	40,147	51–36	W1
88	July 4	Phillies	12–6	**Minter** (3–4)	Eflin (7–8)	—	**SunTrust Park**	40,633	52–36	W1
89	July 5	Marlins	1–0	**Jackson** (4–2)	Quijada (0–3)	—	**SunTrust Park**	41,102	53–36	W2
90	July 6	Marlins	4–5	Smith (4–4)	**Fried** (9–4)	Romo (16)	**SunTrust Park**	37,216	53–37	L1
91	July 7	Marlins	4–3	**Keuchel** (2–2)	Richards (3–10)	**Jackson** (14)	**SunTrust Park**	30,514	54–37	W1
**90th All-Star Game: Cleveland, OH**										
92	July 12	@ Padres	5–3	**Keuchel** (3–2)	Lamet (0–2)	**Jackson** (15)	Petco Park	34,692	55–37	W2
93	July 13	@ Padres	7–5 (10)	**Newcomb** (3–1)	Perdomo (1–2)	**Jackson** (16)	Petco Park	43,148	56–37	W3
94	July 14	@ Padres	4–1	**Soroka** (10–1)	Wingenter (1–2)	**Minter** (5)	Petco Park	34,739	57–37	W4
95	July 15	@ Brewers	4–2	**Fried** (10–4)	Houser (2–4)	**Jackson** (17)	Miller Park	31,850	58–37	W5
96	July 16	@ Brewers	1–13	Woodruff (11–3)	**Wilson** (1–1)	—	Miller Park	31,599	58–38	L1
97	July 17	@ Brewers	4–5	Anderson (5–2)	**Keuchel** (3–3)	Hader (21)	Miller Park	36,928	58–39	L2
98	July 18	Nationals	4–13	Strasburg (12–4)	**Wright** (0–3)	—	**SunTrust Park**	39,363	58–40	L3
99	July 19	Nationals	4–3	**Jackson** (5–2)	Rodney (0–3)	—	**SunTrust Park**	39,344	59–40	W1
100	July 20	Nationals	3–5	Sánchez (6–6)	**Soroka** (10–2)	Doolittle (21)	**SunTrust Park**	42,467	59–41	L1
101	July 21	Nationals	7–1	**Gausman** (3–5)	Ross (0–2)	—	**SunTrust Park**	31,848	60–41	W1
102	July 23	Royals	4–5	Hill (1–0)	**Swarzak** (2–3)	Kennedy (18)	**SunTrust Park**	36,570	60–42	L1
103	July 24	Royals	0–2	Keller (7–9)	**Teherán** (5–7)	Kennedy (19)	**SunTrust Park**	38,863	60–43	L2
104	July 26	@ Phillies	9–2	**Newcomb** (4–1)	Arrieta (8–8)	—	Citizens Bank Park	31,268	61–43	W1
105	July 27	@ Phillies	15–7	**Fried** (11–4)	Eflin (7–11)	—	Citizens Bank Park	39,340	62–43	W2
106	July 28	@ Phillies	2–9	Nola (9–2)	**Gausman** (3–6)	—	Citizens Bank Park	37,037	62–44	L1
107	July 29	@ Nationals	3–6	Corbin (9–5)	**Keuchel** (3–4)	—	Nationals Park	24,292	62–45	L2
108	July 30	@ Nationals	11–8	**Teherán** (6–7)	Fedde (1–2)	—	Nationals Park	26,566	63–45	W1
109	July 31	@ Nationals	5–4 (10)	**Newcomb** (5–1)	Doolittle (6–3)	**Tomlin** (2)	Nationals Park	31,576	64–45	W2

August: 19–9 (Home: 11–4; Away: 8–5)

#	Date	Opponent	Score	Win	Loss	Save	Stadium	Attendance	Record	Box/Streak
110	August 1	Reds	4–1 (7)	**Fried** (12–4)	DeSclafani (6–6)	—	**SunTrust Park**	28,677	65–45	W3
111	August 2	Reds	2–5	Wood (1–0)	**Gausman** (3–7)	Iglesias (21)	**SunTrust Park**	37,743	65–46	L1
112	August 3	Reds	5–4 (10)	**Jackson** (6–2)	Hughes (3–4)	—	**SunTrust Park**	42,085	66–46	W1
113	August 4	Reds	4–6 (10)	Stephenson (3–2)	**Greene** (0–3)	Hernandez (2)	**SunTrust Park**	33,083	66–47	L1
114	August 5	@ Twins	3–5	May (5–3)	**Martin** (0–3)	—	Target Field	26,722	66–48	L2
115	August 6	@ Twins	12–7	**Foltynewicz** (3–5)	Berríos (10–6)	—	Target Field	36,721	67–48	W1
116	August 7	@ Twins	11–7	**Fried** (13–4)	Perez (8–5)	—	Target Field	35,682	68–48	W2
117	August 8	@ Marlins	2–9	Hernández (2–4)	**Keuchel** (3–5)	—	Marlins Park	8,948	68–49	L1
118	August 9	@ Marlins	8–4	**Teherán** (7–7)	Smith (7–6)	—	Marlins Park	8,057	69–49	W1
119	August 10	@ Marlins	6–7 (10)	Brigham (2–1)	**Newcomb** (5–2)	—	Marlins Park	29,720	69–50	L1
120	August 11	@ Marlins	5–4	**Foltynewicz** (4–5)	Noesí (0–2)	**Jackson** (18)	Marlins Park	12,338	70–50	W1
121	August 13	Mets	5–3	**Fried** (14–4)	Wheeler (9–7)	**Melancon** (2)	**SunTrust Park**	27,627	71–50	W2
122	August 14	Mets	6–4	**Martin** (1–3)	Lugo (5–3)	**Blevins** (1)	**SunTrust Park**	23,582	72–50	W3
123	August 15	Mets	8–10	Stroman (7–11)	**Teherán** (7–8)	Díaz (25)	**SunTrust Park**	25,424	72–51	L1
124	August 16	Dodgers	3–8	Kolarek (5–3)	**Newcomb** (5–3)	Urías (4)	**SunTrust Park**	41,413	72–52	L2
125	August 17	Dodgers	4–3	**Newcomb** (6–3)	Ryu (12–3)	**Melancon** (3)	**SunTrust Park**	43,619	73–52	W1
126	August 18	Dodgers	5–3	**Swarzak** (3–3)	May (1–2)	**Melancon** (4)	**SunTrust Park**	37,617	74–52	W2
127	August 20	Marlins	5–1	**Keuchel** (4–5)	Kinley (1–1)	—	**SunTrust Park**	37,217	75–52	W3
128	August 21	Marlins	5–0	**Teherán** (8–8)	Smith (8–7)	—	**SunTrust Park**	23,537	76–52	W4
129	August 22	Marlins	3–2	**Melancon** (5–2)	Stanek (0–3)	—	**SunTrust Park**	23,967	77–52	W5
130	August 23	@ Mets	2–1 (14)	**Jackson** (7–2)	Familia (4–2)	**Melancon** (5)	Citi Field	31,437	78–52	W6
131	August 24	@ Mets	9–5	**Tomlin** (2–1)	Brach (4–4)	—	Citi Field	38,300	79–52	W7
132	August 25	@ Mets	2–1	**Keuchel** (5–5)	Matz (8–8)	**Melancon** (6)	Citi Field	30,170	80–52	W8
133	August 26	@ Rockies	1–3	Díaz (5–3)	**Swarzak** (3–4)	—	Coors Field	29,803	80–53	L1
134	August 27	@ Blue Jays	1–3	Godley (4–5)	**Soroka** (10–3)	Giles (17)	Rogers Centre	24,578	80–54	L2
135	August 28	@ Blue Jays	9–4	**Jackson** (8–2)	Waguespack (4–2)	—	Rogers Centre	23,112	81–54	W1
136	August 30	White Sox	10–7	**Fried** (15–4)	Nova(9-11)	**Melancon** (7)	**SunTrust Park**	39,097	82-54	W2
137	August 31	White Sox	11–5	**Keuchel** (6-5)	Lopez (8-12)	—	**SunTrust Park**	36,664	83-54	W3

September: 14–11 (Home: 9–4; Away: 5–7)

#	Date	Opponent	Score	Win	Loss	Save	Stadium	Attendance	Record	Box/Streak
138	September 1	White Sox	5–3	**Teherán** (9–8)	Giolito (14–8)	**Melancon** (8)	**SunTrust Park**	41,397	84–54	W4
139	September 2	Blue Jays	6–3	**Soroka** (11–3)	Waguespack (4–3)	**Melancon** (9)	**SunTrust Park**	28,987	85–54	W5
140	September 3	Blue Jays	7–2	**Foltynewicz** (5–5)	Font (3–4)	—	**SunTrust Park**	25,427	86–54	W6
141	September 5	Nationals	4–2	**Fried** (16–4)	Strasburg (16–6)	—	**SunTrust Park**	28,831	87–54	W7
142	September 6	Nationals	4–3	**Keuchel** (7–5)	Corbin (11–7)	**Greene** (23)	**SunTrust Park**	37,181	88–54	W8
143	September 7	Nationals	5–4	**Teherán** (10–8)	Voth (1–1)	**Melancon** (10)	**SunTrust Park**	40,467	89–54	W9
144	September 8	Nationals	4–9	Scherzer (10–5)	**Soroka** (11–4)	—	**SunTrust Park**	31,789	89–55	L1
145	September 9	@ Phillies	7–2	**Foltynewicz** (6–5)	Nola (12–5)	—	Citizens Bank Park	25,071	90–55	W1
146	September 10	@ Phillies	5–6	Parker (3–2)	**Fried** (16–5)	Neris (25)	Citizens Bank Park	24,220	90–56	L1
147	September 11	@ Phillies	3–1	**Keuchel** (8–5)	Eflin (8–12)	**Melancon** (11)	Citizens Bank Park	23,243	91–56	W1
148	September 12	@ Phillies	5–9	Hughes (5–5)	**Teherán** (10–9)	—	Citizens Bank Park	27,022	91–57	L1
149	September 13	@ Nationals	5–0	**Soroka** (12–4)	Scherzer (10–6)	—	Nationals Park	39,730	92–57	W1
150	September 14	@ Nationals	10–1	**Foltynewicz** (7–5)	Suero (5–8)	—	Nationals Park	39,664	93–57	W2
151	September 15	@ Nationals	0–7	Sánchez (9–8)	**Fried** (16–6)	—	Nationals Park	29,350	93–58	L1
152	September 17	Phillies	4–5	Velasquez (7–7)	**Keuchel** (8–6)	Neris (27)	**SunTrust Park**	28,843	93–59	L2
153	September 18	Phillies	1–4	Eflin (9–12)	**Teherán** (10–10)	Neris (28)	**SunTrust Park**	27,937	93–60	L3
154	September 19	Phillies	5–4	**Soroka** (13–4)	Nola (12–6)	**Melancon** (12)	**SunTrust Park**	33,223	94–60	W1
155	September 20	Giants	6–0	**Foltynewicz** (8–5)	Beede (5–10)	—	**SunTrust Park**	37,419	95–60	W2
156	September 21	Giants	8–1	**Fried** (17–6)	Cueto (1–1)	—	**SunTrust Park**	40,899	96–60	W3
157	September 22	Giants	1–4	Webb (2–2)	**Keuchel** (8–7)	Smith (34)	**SunTrust Park**	33,674	96–61	L1
158	September 24	@ Royals	6–9	Duffy (7–6)	**Teherán** (10–11)	—	Kauffman Stadium	16,688	96–62	L2
159	September 25	@ Royals	10–2	**Jackson** (9–2)	Barnes (1–4)	—	Kauffman Stadium	16,931	97–62	W1
160	September 27	@ Mets	2–4	Stroman (10–13)	**Keuchel** (8–8)	Lugo (6)	Citi Field	26,264	97–63	L1
161	September 28	@ Mets	0–3	Matz (11–10)	**Foltynewicz** (8–6)	Díaz (26)	Citi Field	32,210	97–64	L2
162	September 29	@ Mets	6–7 (11)	Mazza (1–1)	**Dayton** (0–1)	—	Citi Field	31,523	97–65	L3

Legend: = Win = Loss = Postponement
Bold = Braves team member

=== National League East ===
NL East
Team	W	L	Pct.	GB	Home	Road
Atlanta Braves	97	65	.599	—	50‍–‍31	47‍–‍34
Washington Nationals	93	69	.574	4	50‍–‍31	43‍–‍38
New York Mets	86	76	.531	11	48‍–‍33	38‍–‍43
Philadelphia Phillies	81	81	.500	16	45‍–‍36	36‍–‍45
Miami Marlins	57	105	.352	40	30‍–‍51	27‍–‍54

=== National League Wild Card ===
Division leaders
Team	W	L	Pct.
Los Angeles Dodgers	106	56	.654
Atlanta Braves	97	65	.599
St. Louis Cardinals	91	71	.562

Wild Card teams (Top 2 teams qualify for postseason)
Team	W	L	Pct.	GB
Washington Nationals	93	69	.574	+4
Milwaukee Brewers	89	73	.549	—
New York Mets	86	76	.531	3
Arizona Diamondbacks	85	77	.525	4
Chicago Cubs	84	78	.519	5
Philadelphia Phillies	81	81	.500	8
San Francisco Giants	77	85	.475	12
Cincinnati Reds	75	87	.463	14
Colorado Rockies	71	91	.438	18
San Diego Padres	70	92	.432	19
Pittsburgh Pirates	69	93	.426	20
Miami Marlins	57	105	.352	32

== Postseason ==
=== Game log ===
2019 postseason game log: 2–3 (Home: 1–2; Away: 1–1)
NLDS: 2–3 (Home: 1–2; Away: 1–1)

#	Date	Opponent	Score	Win	Loss	Save	Attendance	Record
1	October 3	Cardinals	6–7	Martínez (1–0)	Melancon (0–1)	—	42,631	0–1
2	October 4	Cardinals	3–0	Foltynewicz (1–0)	Flaherty (0–1)	Melancon (1)	42,911	1–1
3	October 6	@ Cardinals	3–1	Newcomb (1–0)	Martínez (1–1)	Melancon (2)	46,701	2–1
4	October 7	@ Cardinals	4–5 (10)	Mikolas (1–0)	Teherán (0–1)	—	42,203	2–2
5	October 9	Cardinals	1–13	Flaherty (1–1)	Foltynewicz (1–1)	—	43,122	2–3

=== Postseason rosters ===
Playoff rosters
National League Division Series

- Pitchers: 15 Sean Newcomb 19 Shane Greene 26 Mike Foltynewicz 32 Josh Tomlin 36 Mark Melancon 40 Mike Soroka 49 Julio Teherán (Games 2–5) 51 Chris Martin (Game 1) 54 Max Fried 56 Darren O'Day 60 Dallas Keuchel 77 Luke Jackson
- Catchers: 16 Brian McCann 25 Tyler Flowers 45 Francisco Cervelli
- Infielders: 1 Ozzie Albies 5 Freddie Freeman 7 Dansby Swanson 20 Josh Donaldson 24 Adeiny Hechavarria
- Outfielders: 9 Billy Hamilton 13 Ronald Acuña Jr. 14 Matt Joyce 18 Rafael Ortega 22 Nick Markakis 23 Adam Duvall

== Record vs. opponents ==
2019 National League record Source: MLB Standings Grid – 2019
Team	AZ	ATL	CHC	CIN	COL	LAD	MIA	MIL	NYM	PHI	PIT	SD	SF	STL	WSH	AL
Arizona	—	4–3	2–4	3–3	9–10	8–11	3–4	2–5	2–5	4–2	6–1	11–8	10–9	3–3	4–3	14–6
Atlanta	3–4	—	5–2	3–4	3–3	2–4	15–4	3–3	11–8	9–10	5–2	5–2	5–2	4–2	11–8	13–7
Chicago	4–2	2–5	—	8–11	3–3	3–4	6–1	9–10	5–2	2–5	11–8	4–3	4–2	9–10	2–4	12–8
Cincinnati	3–3	4–3	11–8	—	3–3	1–5	6–1	8–11	3–4	3–4	7–12	5–2	4–3	7–12	1–5	9–11
Colorado	10–9	3–3	3–3	3–3	—	4–15	5–2	5–2	2–4	3–4	2–5	11–8	7–12	2–5	3–4	8–12
Los Angeles	11–8	4–2	4–3	5–1	15–4	—	5–1	4–3	5–2	5–2	6–0	13–6	12–7	3–4	4–3	10–10
Miami	4–3	4–15	1–6	1–6	2–5	1–5	—	2–5	6–13	10–9	3–3	4–2	3–3	3–4	4–15	9–11
Milwaukee	5–2	3–3	10–9	11–8	2–5	3–4	5–2	—	5–1	4–3	15–4	3–4	2–4	9–10	4–2	8–12
New York	5–2	8–11	2–5	4–3	4–2	2–5	13–6	1–5	—	7–12	5–1	3–3	3–4	2–5	12–7	15–5
Philadelphia	2–4	10–9	5–2	4–3	4–3	2–5	9–10	3–4	12–7	—	4–2	3–3	3–4	4–2	5–14	11–9
Pittsburgh	1–6	2–5	8–11	12–7	5–2	0–6	3–3	4–15	1–5	2–4	—	6–1	5–2	5–14	3–4	12–8
San Diego	8–11	2–5	3–4	2–5	8–11	6–13	2–4	4–3	3–3	3–3	1–6	—	9–10	4–2	4–3	11–9
San Francisco	9–10	2–5	2–4	3–4	12–7	7–12	3–3	4–2	4–3	4–3	2–5	10–9	—	3–4	1–5	11–9
St. Louis	3–3	2–4	10–9	12–7	5–2	4–3	4–3	10–9	5–2	2–4	14–5	2–4	4–3	—	5–2	9–11
Washington	3–4	8–11	4–2	5–1	4–3	3–4	15–4	2–4	7–12	14–5	4–3	3–4	5–1	2–5	—	14–6

== Roster ==
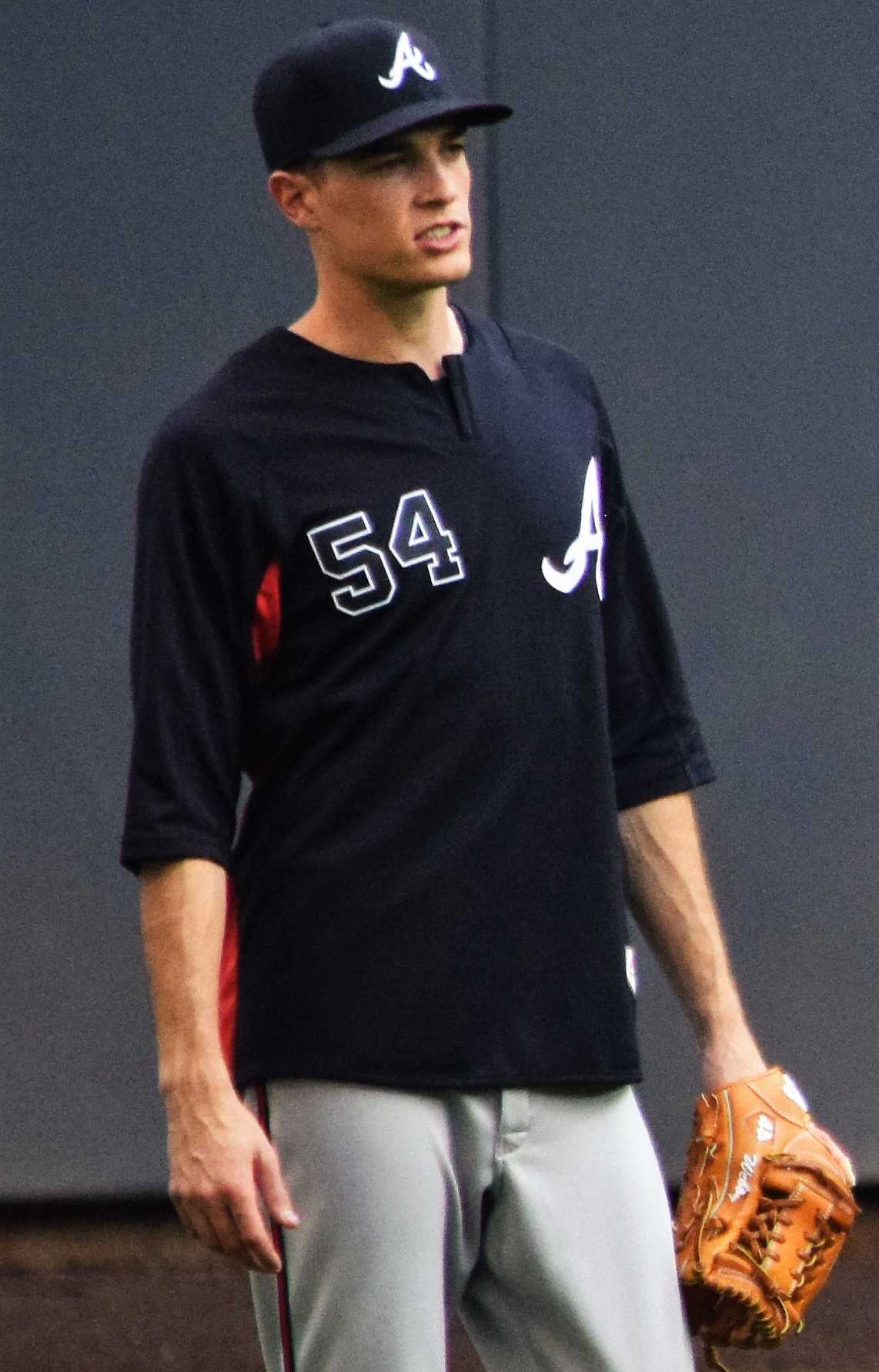
Max Fried in 2019.

2019 Atlanta Braves
Roster
Pitchers: 19 Jesse Biddle; 50 Jerry Blevins; 51 Shane Carle; 75 Grant Dayton; 26 Mike Foltynewicz; 54 Max Fried; 45 Kevin Gausman; 19 Shane Greene; 77 Luke Jackson; 60 Dallas Keuchel; 51 Chris Martin; 36 Mark Melancon; 33 A. J. Minter; 15 Sean Newcomb; 56 Darren O'Day; 52,67 Wes Parsons; 61 Chad Sobotka; 40 Mike Soroka; 38 Anthony Swarzak; 49 Julio Teherán; 32 Josh Tomlin; 62 Touki Toussaint; 48 Jonny Venters; 38 Arodys Vizcaíno; 63 Jeremy Walker; 71 Jacob Webb; 66,46 Bryse Wilson; 58 Daniel Winkler; 65,30 Kyle Wright; 73 Huascar Ynoa	Catchers: 45 Francisco Cervelli; 25 Tyler Flowers; 70, 12 Alex Jackson; 16 Brian McCann; 55 John Ryan Murphy; Infielders: 1 Ozzie Albies; 17 Johan Camargo; 5 Freddie Freeman; 20 Josh Donaldson; 24 Adeiny Hechavarria; 7 Dansby Swanson	Outfielders: 13 Ronald Acuña Jr.; 8 Charlie Culberson; 23 Adam Duvall; 9 Billy Hamilton; 11 Ender Inciarte; 14 Matthew Joyce; 22 Nick Markakis; 18 Rafael Ortega; 27 Austin Riley	Manager: 43 Brian Snitker; Coaches: 59 José Castro (assistant hitting); 60, 57 Sal Fasano (catching coach); 57, 39 Rick Kranitz (pitching); 97 Jimmy Leo (bullpen catcher); 98 Tomás Pérez (batting practice pitcher); 34 Marty Reed (bullpen); 28 Kevin Seitzer (hitting); 37 Ron Washington (third base); 4 Walt Weiss (bench); 99 José Yepez (bullpen catcher); 2 Eric Young (first base)

== Player stats ==
Note: Team leaders in each category are noted in bold.

- = League leader in category.

=== Batting ===
Note: G = Games played; AB = At bats; R = Runs; H = Hits; 2B = Doubles; 3B = Triples; HR = Home runs; RBI = Runs batted in; SB = Stolen bases; BB = Walks; AVG = Batting average; SLG = Slugging average

Player	G	AB	R	H	2B	3B	HR	RBI	SB	BB	AVG	SLG
Ozzie Albies	**160**	**640***	102	**189***	**43**	**8**	24	86	15	54	**.295**	.500
Ronald Acuña Jr.	156	626	**127***	175	22	2	41	101	**37***	76	.280	.518
Freddie Freeman	158	597	113	176	34	2	**38**	**121**	6	87	**.295**	**.549**
Josh Donaldson	155	549	96	142	33	0	37	94	4	**100**	.259	.521
Dansby Swanson	127	483	77	121	26	3	17	65	10	51	.251	.422
Nick Markakis	116	414	61	118	25	2	9	62	2	47	.285	.420
Brian McCann	85	277	28	69	9	0	12	45	0	31	.249	.412
Austin Riley	80	274	41	62	11	1	18	49	0	16	.226	.471
Tyler Flowers	85	271	36	62	11	3	11	34	0	31	.229	.413
Johan Camargo	98	232	31	54	12	1	7	32	1	15	.233	.384
Matt Joyce	129	200	32	59	10	0	7	23	0	38	.295	.450
Ender Inciarte	65	199	30	49	11	2	5	24	7	26	.246	.397
Charlie Culberson	108	135	14	35	5	2	5	20	0	6	.259	.437
Adam Duvall	41	120	17	32	4	1	10	19	0	7	.267	.567
Rafael Ortega	34	88	7	18	3	0	2	10	3	8	.205	.307
Adeiny Hechavarria	24	61	14	20	5	1	4	15	0	6	.328	.639
Billy Hamilton	26	41	9	11	2	0	0	3	4	7	.268	.317
Francisco Cervelli	14	32	4	9	5	1	2	7	0	4	.281	.688
Alex Jackson	4	13	0	0	0	0	0	0	0	1	.000	.000
John Ryan Murphy	1	1	0	0	0	0	0	0	0	0	.000	.000
Pitcher totals	162	307	16	31	6	0	0	14	0	8	.101	.121
**Team totals**	**162**	**5560**	**855**	**1432**	**277**	**29**	**249**	**824**	**89**	**619**	**.258**	**.452**

=== Pitching ===
Note: W = Wins; L = Losses; ERA = Earned run average; G = Games pitched; GS = Games started; SV = Saves; IP = Innings pitched; H = Hits allowed; R = Runs allowed; ER = Earned runs allowed; BB = Walks allowed; SO = Strikeouts

Player	W	L	ERA	G	GS	SV	IP	H	R	ER	BB	SO
Michael Soroka	13	4	**2.68**	29	29	0	**174.2**	153	56	52	41	142
Julio Teherán	10	**11**	3.81	33	**33**	0	**174.2**	148	**81**	**74**	**83**	162
Max Fried	**17**	6	4.02	33	30	0	165.2	**174**	80	**74**	47	**173**
Mike Foltynewicz	8	6	4.54	21	21	0	117.0	109	65	59	37	105
Dallas Keuchel	8	8	3.75	19	19	0	112.2	115	50	47	39	91
Kevin Gausman	3	7	6.19	16	16	0	80.0	92	60	55	27	85
Josh Tomlin	2	1	3.74	51	1	2	79.1	82	35	33	7	51
Luke Jackson	9	2	3.84	**70**	0	**18**	72.2	76	34	31	26	106
Sean Newcomb	6	3	3.16	55	4	1	68.1	61	28	24	29	65
Touki Toussaint	4	0	5.62	24	1	0	41.2	44	28	26	26	45
Anthony Swarzak	1	2	4.31	44	0	1	39.2	38	19	19	19	35
Jerry Blevins	1	0	3.90	45	0	1	32.1	25	15	14	16	37
Jacob Webb	4	0	1.39	36	0	2	32.1	24	10	5	12	28
A. J. Minter	3	4	7.06	36	0	5	29.1	36	23	23	23	35
Chad Sobotka	0	0	6.21	32	0	0	29.0	28	22	20	19	38
Shane Greene	0	1	4.01	27	0	1	24.2	25	11	11	5	21
Dan Winkler	3	1	4.98	27	0	0	21.2	18	14	12	11	22
Mark Melancon	1	0	3.86	23	0	11	21.0	22	9	9	2	24
Bryse Wilson	1	1	7.20	6	4	0	20.0	26	18	16	10	16
Kyle Wright	0	3	8.69	7	4	0	19.2	24	19	19	13	18
Chris Martin	1	1	4.08	20	0	0	17.2	17	10	8	1	22
Wes Parsons	1	2	3.52	17	0	0	15.1	11	7	6	13	12
Grant Dayton	0	1	3.00	14	0	0	12.0	12	5	4	4	14
Jesse Biddle	0	1	5.40	15	0	0	11.2	18	11	7	10	11
Shane Carle	0	0	9.64	6	0	0	9.1	11	10	10	9	6
Jeremy Walker	0	0	1.93	6	0	0	9.1	9	2	2	4	6
Darren O'Day	0	0	1.69	8	0	0	5.1	3	1	1	1	6
Jonny Venters	0	0	17.36	9	0	1	4.2	9	13	9	8	7
Arodys Vizcaíno	1	0	2.25	4	0	1	4.0	3	1	1	3	6
Huascar Ynoa	0	0	18.00	2	0	0	3.0	6	6	6	1	3
Charlie Culberson	0	0	0.00	2	0	0	2.0	2	0	0	2	1
**Team totals**	**97**	**65**	**4.19**	**162**	**162**	**44**	**1450.2**	**1421**	**743**	**675**	**548**	**1393**

== Farm system ==
Level	Team	League	Manager
AAA	Gwinnett Stripers	International League	Damon Berryhill
AA	Mississippi Braves	Southern League	Chris Maloney
A-Advanced	Florida Fire Frogs	Florida State League	Barrett Kleinknecht
A	Rome Braves	South Atlantic League	Matt Tuiasosopo
Rookie	Danville Braves	Appalachian League	Anthony Nunez
Rookie	GCL Braves	Gulf Coast League	Angel Flores
Rookie	DSL Braves	Dominican Summer League	Jefferson Romero
