= Michael Soroka =

Canadian baseball player (born 1997)

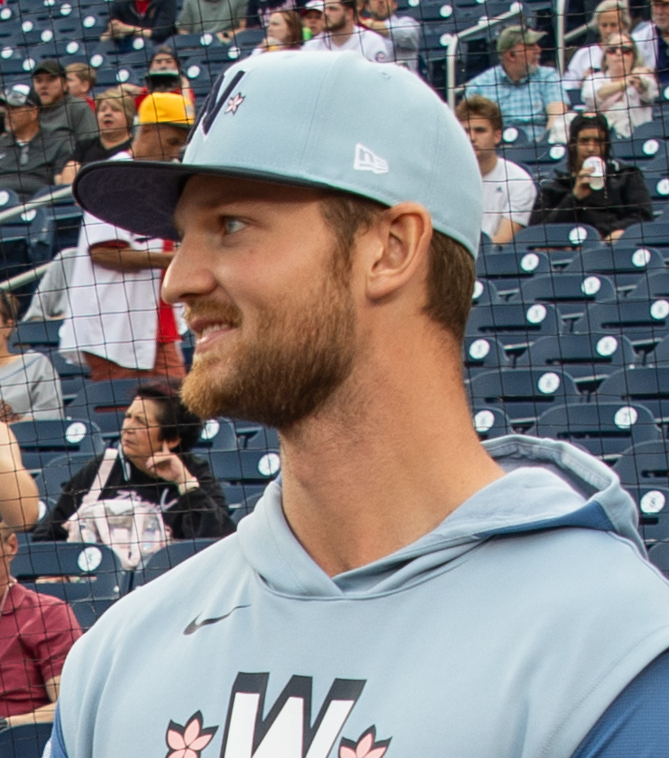
- Soroka with the Nationals in 2025

Free agent
- Pitcher
- Born: August 4, 1997 (age 29); Calgary, Alberta, Canada
- Bats: Right Throws: Right

MLB debut
- May 1, 2018, for the Atlanta Braves

MLB statistics (through 2026 season)
- Win–loss record: 29–31
- Earned run average: 3.76
- Strikeouts: 493
- Stats at Baseball Reference

Teams
- Atlanta Braves (2018–2020, 2023); Chicago White Sox (2024); Washington Nationals (2025); Chicago Cubs (2025); Arizona Diamondbacks (2026)

Career highlights and awards
- All-Star (2019); Pitched an immaculate inning on March 30, 2026

Michael John Graydon Soroka (born August 4, 1997) is a Canadian professional baseball pitcher who is a free agent. He has played in Major League Baseball (MLB) for the Atlanta Braves, Chicago White Sox, Washington Nationals, Chicago Cubs, and Arizona Diamondbacks.

Soroka made his MLB debut in 2018 with the Braves. He was an MLB All-Star in 2019, and he finished second in National League Rookie of the Year Award voting. In 2020, he became the Braves' youngest Opening Day starter in the team's modern history, before an injury ended his season. Soroka dealt with multiple injures through the next two years before returning to the major leagues in 2023.

== Early life ==
Soroka was born on August 4, 1997, in Calgary, Alberta, the son of Gary, a former university and junior hockey player, and Sally Soroka; he has two half-sisters. Soroka's mother died in 2010 of melanoma when he was 12.

He attended Bishop Carroll High School in Calgary, and was a goalie in youth hockey before deciding to concentrate on baseball. He pitched for the junior national team, coached by Chris Reitsma, a fellow Canadian baseball pitcher who was also his mentor. Reitsma has noted Soroka's physical similarity with himself. By his senior year, Soroka had committed to play college baseball for the University of California, Berkeley with scholarship. Prior to the 2015 draft, he was ranked 88th in Baseball America's annual rankings of prospects.

Soroka was known as "Mike Soroka" before he expressed his desire to go by "Michael" in 2023.

== Career ==
=== Atlanta Braves ===
==== Minor leagues ====
Soroka was drafted 28th overall by the Atlanta Braves in 2015. He reported to the Gulf Coast League Braves, where he posted a 1.80 ERA in ten innings pitched before being reassigned to the Danville Braves, where he finished the season, going 0–2 with a 3.75 ERA in six starts. Soroka spent the 2016 season with the Rome Braves. There, he posted a 9–9 record with a 3.02 ERA.

Soroka spent 2017 with the Mississippi Braves, posting an 11–8 record with a 2.75 ERA in 153 2/3 inning pitched. As one of the youngest players in Double-A, Soroka participated in the All-Star Futures Game in July. He began the 2018 season with the Gwinnett Stripers of the Triple-A International League, posting a 1.99 ERA, 0.97 WHIP, 24 strikeouts, and five walks over four starts.

==== 2018: MLB debut ====
On May 1, 2018, the Braves promoted Soroka to the major leagues. He faced the New York Mets that night, pitching six innings, yielding one run and recording five strikeouts. He began feeling inflammation in his right shoulder after May 21. He was placed on the disabled list soon thereafter. Rehabilitation in the minor leagues followed throughout June. Because inflammation continued to be a problem, Soroka returned to the ten-day disabled list later that month. On June 27, he was transferred to the 60-day disabled list. In July, it was reported that Soroka would be permitted to begin a throwing regimen by the middle of August. However, in late August, Braves manager Brian Snitker stated that Soroka would miss the remainder of the season. Overall with the 2018 Braves, Soroka registered five starts, a 2–1 record, 3.51 ERA, and 21 strikeouts in 25 2/3 innings pitched.

==== 2019: All-Star and All-MLB team season ====
Before the 2019 season began, Soroka was expected to be one of several pitching prospects to spend some time in the Braves' starting rotation. During the first week of spring training, Soroka disclosed shoulder discomfort first felt during an offseason workout in January 2019. Soroka maintained that the newly reported discomfort was a right trapezius strain, not an issue with his right scapula, which affected him during his debut season. Soroka was cleared to play catch in mid-March, followed by throwing batting practice. Soroka was sent to minor league camp without appearing in a spring training game. Soroka made his season debut against the Arizona Diamondbacks on April 18, 2019, and became the youngest pitcher in the National League upon taking the mound. When he was placed on the National League Roster for the 2019 Major League Baseball All-Star Game, Soroka set another age-related record, as the youngest Atlanta Braves pitcher to be named an all-star. That year, the Braves became the first team to send two players younger than 22 to the All-Star Game, as both Soroka and Ronald Acuña Jr. received that honor in 2019. In the 2019 season, Soroka registered 29 starts, a 13–4 record, 2.68 ERA, and 142 strikeouts in 174 2/3 innings. He was runner-up in NL Rookie of the Year voting to Mets first baseman Pete Alonso, and placed sixth in NL Cy Young Voting. He was selected to the All-MLB Second Team for that year.

==== 2020: Youngest Opening Day starter for the Braves, injury ====
Soroka opened the shortened season for the Braves on July 24, 2020, pitching six scoreless innings against the New York Mets, being the youngest Opening Day starting pitcher in the team's modern history, at the age of 22 years and 354 days. On August 3, in a game in Atlanta against the Mets, Soroka unexpectedly tumbled to the ground after throwing his 48th pitch of the game. He began limping and knelt down to await medical attention. Unable to walk off alone, he was helped off the field and left the game. He had torn his Achilles' tendon, prematurely ending his 2020 season. With the 2020 Braves, Soroka registered three starts, a 0–1 record, 3.95 ERA, and eight strikeouts in 13 2/3 innings.

==== 2021–2022: Injuries and rehabilitation ====
Soroka's salary for the 2021 season was set at $2.8 million after an arbitration hearing. He began the 2021 season on the 60-day injured list in an effort to continue rehab from Achilles surgery he had last year. He had a setback while recovering and was forced to undergo a second surgery on his Achilles. In an interview with MLB Network, Atlanta Braves manager Brian Snitker stated that Soroka would miss the 2021 season. However, Snitker backtracked the next day, saying that Soroka was not out for the season and would be reevaluated in two weeks.

While walking back to the clubhouse on June 24, Soroka suffered a complete re-tear of his Achilles, effectively ending his season. The Braves finished with an 88–73 record, winning the NL East championship and the 2021 World Series, giving the Braves their first title since 1995.

Soroka and the Braves agreed to a contract worth $2.8 million for the 2022 season. After the 2022 season ended, Soroka agreed to another one-year, $2.8 million contract for 2023.

==== 2023: Return to major leagues ====
Soroka was optioned to Triple-A Gwinnett to begin the 2023 season. The Braves promoted Soroka to the major leagues to start on May 29, 1,030 days after his most recent MLB start. On June 30, Soroka won his first game since September 19, 2019, giving up five hits with seven strikeouts thrown in six innings in a win against the Miami Marlins. On September 6, Soroka was placed on the 15-day disabled list with right forearm inflammation; Braves manager Brian Snitker stated that the team would take things cautiously and that Soroka would not pitch again that season.

=== Chicago White Sox ===
On November 16, 2023, the Braves traded Soroka to the Chicago White Sox, along with Jared Shuster, Nicky Lopez, Braden Shewmake, and Riley Gowens for Aaron Bummer. On May 14, 2024, the White Sox moved Soroka to a bullpen role, assuming the vacated spot left by Brad Keller. In 25 total appearances for Chicago, Soroka compiled an 0–10 record and 4.74 ERA with 84 strikeouts across 79 2/3 innings pitched. His record of 0–10 was the fourth-worst “no wins” season in the modern (since 1900) era, and the most losses by a pitcher without a single win since Terry Felton of the 1982 Minnesota Twins went 0–13. It was only the ninth instance since 1900 of a pitcher losing at least nine games, without a single win.

=== Washington Nationals ===
On December 19, 2024, Soroka signed a one-year, $9 million contract with the Washington Nationals. Soroka made 16 starts for Washington in 2025, compiling a 3–8 record and 4.87 ERA with 87 strikeouts across 81 1/3 innings pitched.

=== Chicago Cubs ===
On July 30, 2025, the Nationals traded Soroka to the Chicago Cubs in exchange for Christian Franklin and Ronny Cruz. Soroka made six appearances for Chicago, recording a 1.08 ERA with eight strikeouts across 8 1/3 innings pitched.

=== Arizona Diamondbacks ===
On December 12, 2025, Soroka signed a one-year, $7.5 million contract with the Arizona Diamondbacks. On March 30, 2026, in his first start with the Diamondbacks, Soroka threw the 120th immaculate inning in MLB history against the Detroit Tigers. On October 30, Soroka declined his mutual option and became a free agent.

== See also ==
- List of Major League Baseball pitchers who have thrown an immaculate inning
- List of Atlanta Braves Opening Day starting pitchers
- List of Major League Baseball players from Canada
- List of people from Calgary
