= Julio Teherán =

Colombian baseball player (born 1991)

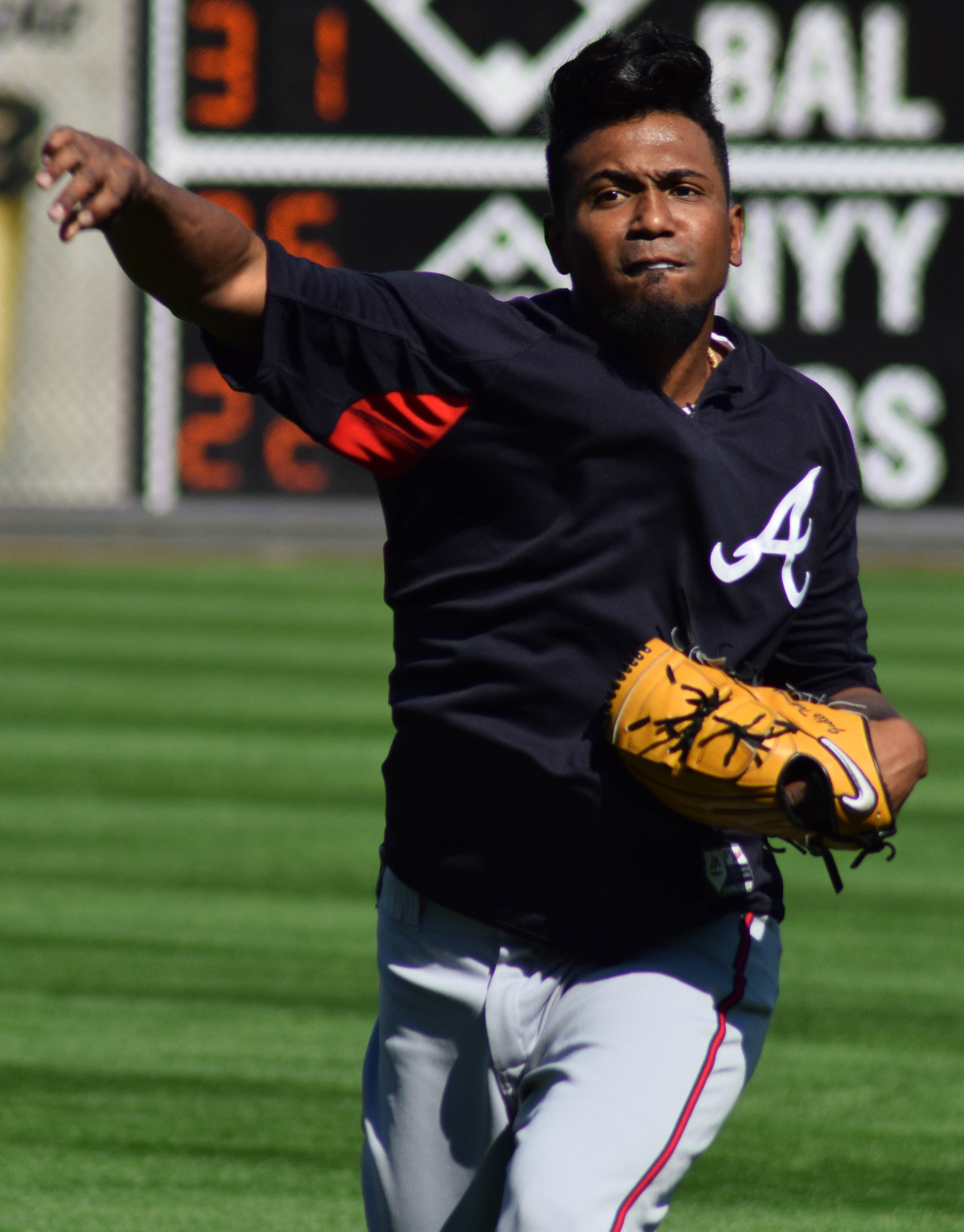
- Teherán with the Atlanta Braves
- Pitcher
- Born: January 27, 1991 (age 35); Cartagena, Colombia
- Batted: Right Threw: Right

MLB debut
- May 7, 2011, for the Atlanta Braves

Last MLB appearance
- April 8, 2024, for the New York Mets

MLB statistics
- Win–loss record: 81–82
- Earned run average: 3.85
- Strikeouts: 1,260
- Stats at Baseball Reference

Teams
- Atlanta Braves (2011–2019); Los Angeles Angels (2020); Detroit Tigers (2021); Milwaukee Brewers (2023); New York Mets (2024)

Career highlights and awards
- 2× All-Star (2014, 2016)

Julio Alberto Teherán Pinto (born January 27, 1991) is a Colombian former professional baseball pitcher. He played in Major League Baseball (MLB) for the Atlanta Braves, Los Angeles Angels, Detroit Tigers, Milwaukee Brewers, and New York Mets. Teherán signed with the Braves as an international free agent in 2007 and made his MLB debut in 2011. He was an MLB All-Star in 2014 and 2016.

== Professional career ==
=== Atlanta Braves ===
==== Minor leagues ====
Teherán signed with the Atlanta Braves on July 3, 2007, and started his professional career in 2008, pitching for the Danville Braves. During that season he started six games and had a 1–2 record with a 6.60 ERA and 17 strikeouts in 15 innings.

He spent the 2009 season pitching for Danville and the Rome Braves. In 14 starts, he went 3–4 with a 3.65 ERA and 67 strikeouts in 81 innings. Prior to the 2010 season, Baseball America ranked him as the Braves' third-best prospect, behind Jason Heyward and Freddie Freeman.

Coming off a promising 2009 season, the Atlanta Braves decided to allow Teheran another full season in the minors. He spent the 2010 season pitching for the Rome Braves, Myrtle Beach Pelicans, and Mississippi Braves. He finished the season with a 9–8 record, a 2.59 ERA, and 159 strikeouts in 142 innings over 24 starts.

Prior to the 2011 season, Teherán was the top-ranked prospect by Baseball America in the Atlanta Braves system, and fifth overall of all prospects. Teherán started the year with the Triple-A Gwinnett Braves, going 3–0 with a 1.80 ERA in his first five starts. He was the starting pitcher for the World team in the 2011 All-Star Futures Game on July 10, 2011, but gave up a home run on a 95-mph fastball to the first batter, Cleveland Indians prospect Jason Kipnis, who was leading off the bottom of the first inning for the United States.

==== 2011 ====
Teherán made his Major League debut on May 7 against the Philadelphia Phillies. He took the loss, allowing three earned runs in 4 2/3 innings pitched with two walks and a strikeout. He was optioned back to Triple-A the next day. Teherán was called up again for another spot start on May 18, pitching four innings and getting a no-decision. He was again optioned back to Triple-A the next day.

He completed the 2011 minor league season with a 15–3 win–loss record and a 2.55 ERA in 24 starts.

Teherán rejoined the Atlanta Braves when rosters expanded in September. He earned his first major league win against the New York Mets on September 8. He was named a starting pitcher on Baseball America's 2011 Minor League All Star team.

==== 2012 ====
Teherán was ranked fifth by Baseball America among all prospects entering the 2012 season, and the second-best right-handed pitcher. With the five-man rotation in question, he was invited to spring training to make his case for a spot on the 25-man roster. In the 5 games he appeared in, including three starts, Teherán struggled to find a groove, giving up 22 hits and 18 runs in just 16.1 innings pitched. He was unable to consistently throw strikes as well, giving up eight walks. After struggling against Major League hitters, Teherán was assigned to re-join Gwinnett where he continued his inconsistencies. He fell to a 7–9 record in 26 starts with a 5.08 ERA, giving up 18 home runs.

When injuries plagued the Major League roster, including a season-ending injury to Brandon Beachy, Teherán was passed over by several other players for the call-up. Atlanta signed free agent Ben Sheets, traded for Paul Maholm, and called Randall Delgado up as replacements rather than the highly touted prospect.

==== 2013 ====
Expectations for the 21-year-old Teherán were lower in 2013 than the previous spring. He was invited to the Major League spring training once again, however, where he showed flares of stardom, posting a 1.29 ERA through four starts, spanning 14 1/3 innings through March 16. He did not start the regular season off strong, with a 5.08 ERA in the first month, but 2013 ended up being his breakout year. He turned things around after April, finishing the season with 14–8 record, 3.20 ERA, 170 strikeouts, and 185 2/3 innings pitched. On June 5, Teherán was pitching a no-hitter against the Pittsburgh Pirates through 7 2/3 innings before giving up a single to pinch-hitter Brandon Inge.

==== 2014 ====
Teherán signed a 6-year, $32.4 million extension with the Braves on February 14, 2014. He was the Braves' Opening Day starter for the first time in his career, taking the loss in a 2–0 game against the Milwaukee Brewers. Teherán was selected to the 2014 MLB All-Star Game, his first All-Star Game selection. However, he was ineligible due to previously pitching the Sunday before the All-Star break. He was honored as an All-Star in a pregame ceremony. Teherán became the second Colombian to be selected an All-Star, following former Braves player Édgar Rentería. In 33 starts on the season, Teheran went 14–13 with a 2.89 ERA, a 1.08 WHIP, and 186 strikeouts in 221 innings.

==== 2015 ====
In 2015, Teherán was once again the Braves' Opening Day starting pitcher, winning a 2–1 game against the Miami Marlins. In 33 starts, he went 11–8 with a 4.04 ERA.

==== 2016 ====
For the third consecutive year, the Braves began their season with Teherán on the mound. He earned a no-decision in a 4–3 loss to the Washington Nationals. During a game on May 24, he recorded a career-high 12 strikeouts, including four in one inning. He was named to his second All-Star Game after posting a 3–7 record with a 2.72 ERA. He finished the season with a 7–10 record and a 3.21 ERA in 188 innings pitched.

==== 2017 ====
For the fourth consecutive year, Teherán was the Braves' Opening Day starting pitcher, pitching six scoreless innings against the New York Mets before being pulled. He joined Rick Mahler (1985–88) and Greg Maddux (1993–96) as the lone Atlanta pitchers to start four straight season openers.

On April 14, Teheran was the starting pitcher for the first game in SunTrust Park history. He allowed two runs on five hits with four walks and five strikeouts in a 5–2 win against the San Diego Padres. He finished the season with an 11–13 record and a 4.69 ERA in 32 starts. Batters stole 26 bases against him, tied for tops in the major leagues, while being caught six times. He struggled mightily at SunTrust Park, going 3–10 with a 5.89 ERA in 17 home starts.

==== 2018 ====
Teherán was named the Opening Day starting pitcher for the 2018 season, and was the first Atlanta Braves pitcher to start five consecutive Opening Day games. Against the New York Mets on May 3, Teherán took a no-hitter through 6.2 innings until allowing a hit by Asdrubal Cabrera. Nevertheless, the Braves won 11–0. Teherán hit his first home run on August 5, while facing Mets' pitcher Corey Oswalt. For the season he was 9–9 with a 3.94 ERA, and led the major leagues in holding opposing batters to the lowest batting average on balls in play (.217).

==== 2019 ====
Prior to the start of the 2019 Atlanta Braves season, Teherán began pitching exclusively from the stretch. He started on Opening Day of the 2019 season, tying Warren Spahn for the most consecutive Opening Day starts made in franchise history. For the season, Teherán compiled a 10–11 record and a 3.81 earned run average. Teherán became a free agent at the end of the season, as his contract option was declined.

=== Los Angeles Angels ===
Teherán and the Los Angeles Angels agreed to terms on a one-year, $9 million contract on December 21, 2019. On July 19, 2020, Teherán disclosed that he had tested positive for COVID-19. Teherán made his Angels debut on August 5, 2020, against the Seattle Mariners. While under a 60 pitch limit, he threw 2 2/3 innings, striking out two while allowing two runs. Teherán finished the season with a career high 10.05 ERA, going 0–4 in 10 appearances. He became a free agent at the end of the season.

=== Detroit Tigers ===
On February 19, 2021, Teherán signed a minor league contract with the Detroit Tigers organization that included an invitation to spring training. On March 24, Teherán's contract was selected to the 40-man roster. Having opted out of his initial minor league contract, Teherán and the Tigers agreed to a one-year deal worth $3 million, plus a $1 million bonus if he starts 20 games. On April 3, Teherán won his Tigers debut, allowing one run over five innings in the Tigers 5–2 win against the Cleveland Indians.

On April 10, 2021, Teherán was placed on the 10-day injured list with a right shoulder strain and was transferred to the 60-day IL a day later. On September 5, the Tigers shut Teheran down for the season. During the offseason, Teherán trained with Carlos Castillo in Miami, who advised him to lower his arm angle, change the grip on his changeup, and begin throwing a cutter.

=== Staten Island FerryHawks ===
On April 21, 2022, Teherán signed with the Staten Island FerryHawks of the Atlantic League of Professional Baseball. In 6 starts, he posted a 1–1 record with a 1.60 ERA over 33 2/3 innings.

=== Toros de Tijuana ===
On June 25, 2022, Teherán's contract was purchased by the Toros de Tijuana of the Mexican League. In 6 starts, he posted a 4–1 record with a 4.88 ERA over 27 2/3 innings. Teherán was released on August 1.

=== Sultanes de Monterrey ===
On August 1, 2022, Teherán signed with the Sultanes de Monterrey of the Mexican League. Teherán made only one start for Monterrey, allowing two runs (one earned) on four hits with six strikeouts across five innings pitched.

=== San Diego Padres ===
On November 27, 2022, Teherán signed a minor league deal with the San Diego Padres. He began the 2023 season with the Triple-A El Paso Chihuahuas, but struggled to a 6.84 ERA and 2–2 record with 29 strikeouts across 5 starts. On May 2, 2023, Teherán opted out of his contract and became a free agent. On May 4, Teheran re-signed with the Padres on a new minor league contract. Teherán again exercised an opt-out clause in his contract.

=== Milwaukee Brewers ===
On May 23, 2023, Teherán signed a one-year, major league contract with the Milwaukee Brewers. In 14 games (11 starts) for Milwaukee, he registered a 3–5 record and 4.40 ERA with 50 strikeouts in 71 2/3 innings pitched. On September 29, Teherán was designated for assignment by the Brewers following the promotion of Caleb Boushley. He cleared waivers and was sent outright to the Triple–A Nashville Sounds on October 2. On October 6, Teherán elected free agency.

=== New York Mets ===
On February 27, 2024, Teherán signed a minor league contract with the Baltimore Orioles. On March 23, Teherán opted out of his contract and was released by Baltimore after failing to make the Opening Day roster.

On April 5, 2024, Teherán signed a one–year, $2.5 million contract with the New York Mets. He made one start against the Atlanta Braves, allowing four runs on six hits across 2 2/3 innings. Teherán was designated for assignment by the Mets on April 9. Two days later on April 11, he rejected an outright assignment in favor of free agency.

=== Chicago Cubs ===
On April 14, 2024, Teherán signed a minor league contract with the Chicago Cubs. In 8 starts for the Triple–A Iowa Cubs, he struggled to an 8.82 ERA with 37 strikeouts across 32 2/3 innings pitched. On June 1, Teherán exercised the opt–out clause in his contract and elected free agency.

=== Baltimore Orioles ===
On June 4, 2024, Teherán signed a minor league contract with the Baltimore Orioles. In 4 starts for the Triple–A Norfolk Tides, he struggled to a 9.18 ERA with 12 strikeouts across 16 2/3 innings pitched. On June 29, Teherán opted out of his contract and reentered free agency.

=== Sultanes de Monterrey (second stint) ===
On July 5, 2024, Teherán signed with the Sultanes de Monterrey of the Mexican League. In 3 starts for Monterrey, he registered a 1–1 record and 2.35 ERA with 12 strikeouts over 15 1/3 innings pitched. Teherán was released by the Sultanes on March 5, 2025.

=== Toros de Tijuana (second stint) ===
On March 25, 2025, Teherán signed with the Toros de Tijuana of the Mexican League. On July 1, Teherán was traded to El Águila de Veracruz of the Mexican League in exchange for David Reyes. However, on July 3, the transaction was rescinded and Luis Márquez was officially traded to Veracruz on Teherán's place. In 14 appearances (12 starts) for Tijuana, he logged a 4–3 record and 6.95 ERA with 38 strikeouts over 57 innings of work. On July 11, Teherán was released by the Toros.

On March 9, 2026, Teherán announced his retirement from professional baseball.

== International career ==
Teherán represents the Colombia national baseball team in international competition. At the 2017 World Baseball Classic, he pitched five innings of one-run ball against Canada in what would be Colombia's first ever victory in the WBC. He was named to the roster of the 2023 World Baseball Classic, but did not play.

Teherán played with Colombia at the 2026 World Baseball Classic qualifiers, held in March 2025 in Tucson, Arizona. In six scoreless innings against Brazil, he registered four strikeouts and allowed only a single hit. He was named one of the 10 standout players from the qualifiers by MLB.com, helping Colombia qualify to the 2026 tournament undefeated.

At the 2026 World Baseball Classic, he was slated to start Colombia's second game against Canada, but was scratched due to a shoulder impingement and ultimately did not play in the tournament. At the conclusion of the tournament, Teherán announced his retirement from professional baseball.

== Scouting report ==
Teherán throws a four seam fastball that averages 92 mph, paired with a two seam fastball at 89 mph. His slider and change up both are thrown at around 82 mph. His curveball sits in the mid-70s. Teherán also has a screwball (65 mph) that he does not use very often. Teherán has a very effective pickoff move. His 22 successful attempts in 2014 through early September was the most for any pitcher during that period.

== Personal life ==
Teherán's uncle Miguel worked for the Braves as a scout. Teherán's second cousin is Sugar Ray Marimón. They grew up together in Cartagena, and were Braves teammates in 2015.

Teherán married Yoselin Rincón in February 2016. The couple's first child was born in August of that year.

== See also ==
- List of Atlanta Braves Opening Day starting pitchers
- List of Major League Baseball single-inning strikeout leaders
