= Jeremy Walker (baseball) =

American baseball player (born 1995)

- Pitcher
- Born: June 12, 1995 (age 30); Advance, North Carolina, U.S.
- Batted: Right Threw: Right

MLB debut
- July 26, 2019, for the Atlanta Braves

Last MLB appearance
- September 15, 2019, for the Atlanta Braves

MLB statistics
- Win–loss record: 0–0
- Earned run average: 1.93
- Strikeouts: 6
- Stats at Baseball Reference

Teams
- Atlanta Braves (2019)

Jeremy Price Walker (born June 12, 1995) is an American former professional baseball pitcher. Walker was drafted by the Atlanta Braves in the 5th round of the 2016 MLB draft. He played in Major League Baseball (MLB) for the Braves during the 2019 season.

== Career ==
=== Atlanta Braves ===
Walker attended Calvary Baptist Day School (2010-12) Winston-Salem, North Carolina and Davie County High School (2013) Mocksville, North Carolina. He attended Gardner–Webb University and played college baseball for the Runnin' Bulldogs for three years. Walker was drafted by the Atlanta Braves in the 5th round, with the 139th overall selection, of the 2016 MLB draft.

In 2016, Walker played for the Danville Braves, going 3–3 with a 3.18 ERA in 39 2/3 innings. He spent the 2017 season with the Rome Braves, going 7–11 with a 3.97 ERA in 138 innings. He split the 2018 season between the Florida Fire Frogs and the Gwinnett Stripers, combining to go 6–11 with a 3.84 ERA in 143 innings. He opened the 2019 season with the Mississippi Braves and was named to the Southern League All-Star team. He was promoted to Gwinnett on July 5.

On July 24, 2019, the Braves selected Walker's contract and promoted him to the major leagues. He made his MLB debut two days later on July 26 against the Philadelphia Phillies, allowing one hit in one scoreless inning. On February 12, 2021, Walker was released following the waiver claim of Travis Demeritte.

=== San Francisco Giants ===
On February 24, 2021, Walker signed a minor league contract with the San Francisco Giants organization. He did not appear in a game for the Giants organization in 2021. Walker began the 2022 season with the Triple–A Sacramento River Cats, and also pitched in one game for the Single–A San Jose Giants. In 28 games for Sacramento, he struggled to a 6.88 ERA with 38 strikeouts in 35 1/3 innings pitched.

=== Tampa Bay Rays ===
On August 1, 2022, the Giants traded Walker to the Tampa Bay Rays in exchange for Ford Proctor. In 17 games for the Triple–A Durham Bulls, Walker recorded a 5.91 ERA with 14 strikeouts across 21 1/3 innings of work. He elected free agency following the season on November 10.

=== Philadelphia Phillies ===
On December 8, 2022, Walker announced on Instagram that he had signed a contract with the Philadelphia Phillies. The minor-league contract included an invite to spring training. On January 24, 2023, he was assigned to the Lehigh Valley IronPigs, the organization's Triple–A affiliate. In 47 appearances, he registered a 6–2 record and 2.90 ERA with 52 strikeouts across 68 1/3 innings of work. Walker elected free agency following the season on November 6.

=== Algodoneros de Unión Laguna ===
On February 26, 2024, Walker signed with the Algodoneros de Unión Laguna of the Mexican League. In 9 starts for the Algodoneros, he posted a 2–3 record and 4.38 ERA with 20 strikeouts across 39 innings pitched. Walker was released by the team on March 10, 2025.
