= Luke Jackson (baseball) =

American baseball player (born 1991)

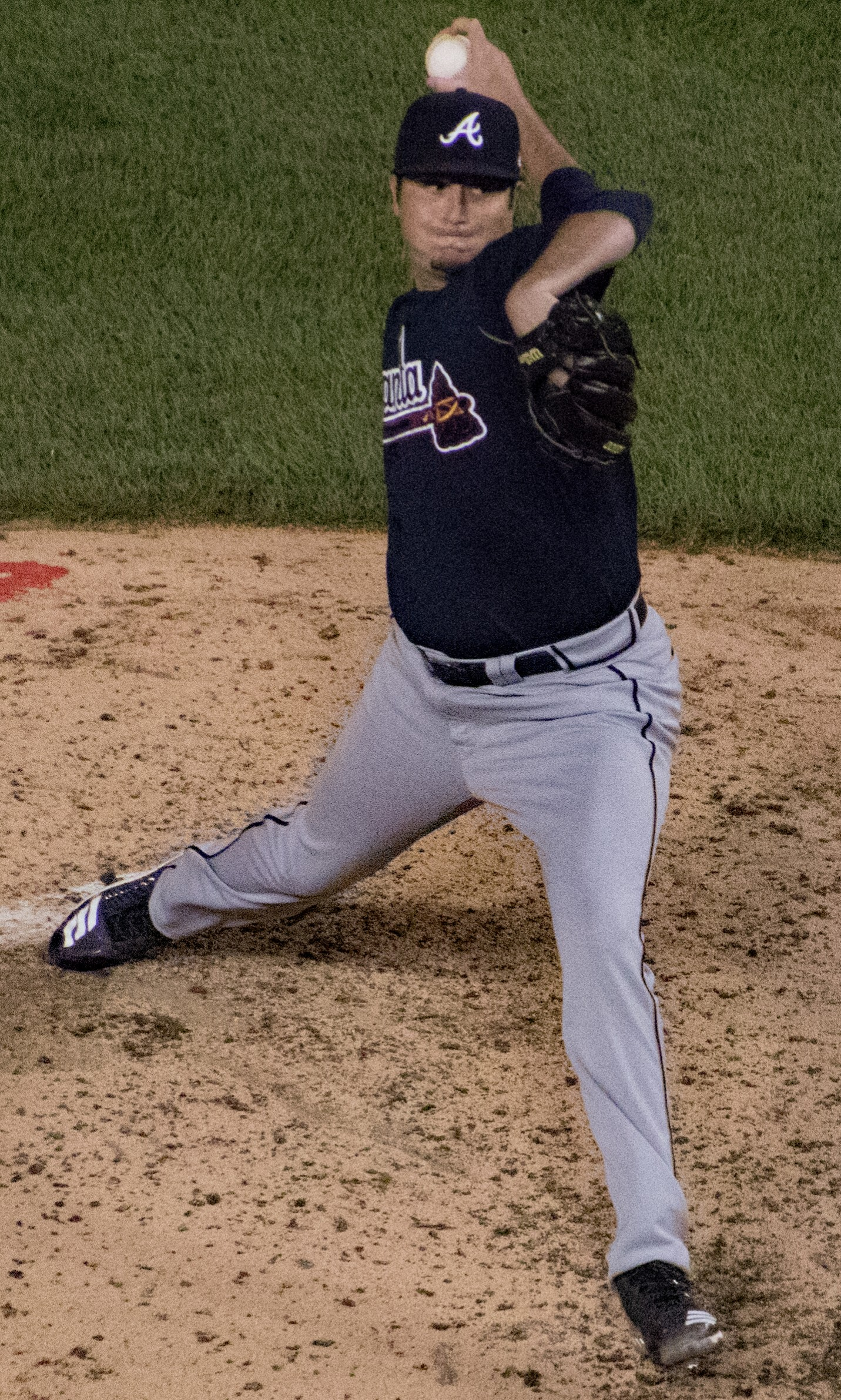
- Jackson with the Atlanta Braves in 2018

Free agent
- Pitcher
- Born: August 24, 1991 (age 35); Fort Lauderdale, Florida, U.S.
- Bats: Right Throws: Right

MLB debut
- September 4, 2015, for the Texas Rangers

MLB statistics (through 2025 season)
- Win–loss record: 24–16
- Earned run average: 4.22
- Strikeouts: 424
- Stats at Baseball Reference

Teams
- Texas Rangers (2015–2016); Atlanta Braves (2017–2021); San Francisco Giants (2023–2024); Atlanta Braves (2024); Texas Rangers (2025); Detroit Tigers (2025); Seattle Mariners (2025)

Career highlights and awards
- World Series champion (2021)

Luke Ray Jackson (born August 24, 1991) is an American professional baseball pitcher who is a free agent. He has previously played in Major League Baseball (MLB) for the Atlanta Braves, San Francisco Giants, Texas Rangers, Detroit Tigers, and Seattle Mariners. He was drafted by the Rangers in the first round, 45th overall, of the 2010 MLB draft and made his MLB debut with them in 2015.

== Early life ==
Jackson attended Calvary Christian Academy in Fort Lauderdale, Florida. As a senior, he went 8–0 with an 0.90 earned run average (ERA) in 54 2/3 innings pitched with 87 strikeouts for the baseball team. He graduated in 2010.

== Professional career ==
=== Texas Rangers ===
==== Minor leagues ====
The Texas Rangers drafted Jackson in the first round, with the 45th overall selection of the 2010 Major League Baseball draft. He signed with the Rangers for a signing bonus of $1.545 million, forgoing his commitment to play college baseball at the University of Miami. He made his professional debut in 2011 for the Hickory Crawdads, going 5–6 with a 5.64 ERA.

Jackson started 2012 with Hickory and was promoted to the High-A Myrtle Beach Pelicans in June. For the two teams, he was 10–7 with a 4.65 ERA with 146 strikeouts, the second-most among Rangers minor leaguers, in 129.2 innings, and had 10.1 strikeouts per 9 innings.

He started 2013 back with Myrtle Beach. He was named a Carolina League Mid-Season All-Star. Jackson was promoted to the Double-A Frisco RoughRiders during the season. Between the two teams, he was 11–4 with a 2.04 ERA (the 8th-lowest ERA among all full season minor league pitchers) and 134 strikeouts in 25 games (23 starts) and 128 innings. Batters hit .202 against him, the 7th-lowest batting-average-against among all full season pitchers. After the season, he was named the Nolan Ryan Minor League Pitcher of the Year, and an MiLB organization All Star. Baseball America rated him the ninth-best prospect in the Carolina League.

Jackson started 2014 back with Frisco. He was named a Texas League Mid-Season All-Star. He was later promoted to Triple-A Round Rock Express. His aggregate 126 strikeouts were third-most among Texas minor league pitchers.

In 2015, Jackson started the season with Round Rock. He converted to the bullpen in May, after having started 97 of his first 101 professional games. He was called up to the majors for the first time on August 6, 2015. However, he was sent back down to Round Rock on August 11, before making an appearance with the Rangers, making him a phantom ballplayer.

==== Major leagues ====
The Rangers again promoted Jackson to the major leagues on September 1. His MLB debut on September 4 went poorly: he allowed an RBI double to C. J. Cron of the Los Angeles Angels in Anaheim, giving up 2 runs and getting 2 outs. In 2015 with Texas, Jackson earned no decisions, had a 4.26 ERA in 6 2/3 innings, and his fastball velocity of 96.8 miles per hour was in the top 5% in baseball.

Jackson split the 2016 season between the Rangers (he had a 10.80 ERA in 11 2/3 innings in 8 games), the 15-day disabled list (back stiffness), and the minors (with Double-A Frisco and Triple-A Round Rock; he was 1–1 with three saves and a 3.69 ERA in 46 1/3 innings over 36 relief appearances).

=== Atlanta Braves ===
On December 8, 2016, the Rangers traded Jackson to the Atlanta Braves for pitchers Tyrell Jenkins and Brady Feigl.

In 2017 in the majors, Jackson was 2–0 with a 4.62 ERA in 50 2/3 innings over 43 relief appearances. Batters had a 41.5% hard-hit percentage against him, in the highest 2% in baseball. Jackson was designated for assignment on December 20, 2017.

Jackson had his contract purchased by Atlanta on April 4, 2018, but he was designated for assignment a second time on April 15. He cleared waivers and was outrighted to the Triple-A Gwinnett Stripers. He had his contract purchased again on May 6, then was again removed from the roster two days later. On June 5, he was called up once again. Jackson was later designated for assignment once more on June 13. He was called up once again on June 17. With Gwinnett in 2018, he was 2–1 with a 1.69 ERA across 21 1/3 innings in which he struck out 34 batters in 10 games (one start). With Atlanta, he was 1–2 with a 4.43 ERA and one save in 40 2/3 innings, striking out 46 batters. In 2018, he stopped throwing a changeup, threw a lower percentage of four-seam fastballs and curveballs, and began to throw his slider more.

In 2019, Jackson served as the team's closer for much of the first half of the season. He was 9–2 with a career-high 18 saves, a 3.84 ERA, and 106 strikeouts in 72 2/3 innings over 70 relief appearances. Jackson induced a 60.5% ground ball percentage, the third-highest in baseball (minimum 70 innings). He induced a chase rate of 35.1%, in the best 4% in baseball, and a whiff percentage of 36.7%, in the best 3% of baseball.

In 2020, he was 2–0 with a 6.84 ERA in 26 1/3 innings over 19 relief appearances. He had a barrel percentage against of 3.1, in the best 5% in baseball.

In 2021, Jackson was 2–2 with a 1.98 ERA and 70 strikeouts in 63 2/3 innings in 71 games (sixth-most in the NL). His 31 holds ranked second in the major leagues. Between 2015 and 2021, he relied mostly on his 88 mph ground ball-inducing slider and 96 mph four-seam fastball, also throwing an 85 mph curveball. He won a championship that year as Atlanta won the World Series in six games.

In early April 2022, the Braves disclosed that magnetic resonance imaging had revealed damage to the ulnar collateral ligament of Jackson's right elbow. He underwent successful Tommy John surgery on that elbow on April 13. In May, Jackson lost his arbitration case, receiving a $3.6 million salary for the 2022 season. He missed the 2022 season due to injury.

=== San Francisco Giants ===
On January 9, 2023, Jackson signed a two-year, $11.5 million contract with the San Francisco Giants, with a club option for 2025. He would earn $3 million in 2023, and $6.5 million in 2024. The Giants had an option for $7 million for 2025, with a $2 million buyout if declined. After rehab stints with the Single-A San Jose Giants and Triple-A Sacramento River Cats, Jackson was activated from the injured list on May 30. He debuted with the Giants the next night, his first appearance in the majors since the 2021 World Series. He was 2–2 with two blown saves in 33 games, with a 2.97 ERA and 43 strikeouts in 33 1/3 innings.

Jackson started the 2024 season with a 4–2 record, 5.40 ERA, and 33 strikeouts in 35 innings.

=== Atlanta Braves (second stint) ===
On July 29, 2024, the Giants traded Jackson and Jorge Soler to the Atlanta Braves in exchange for Tyler Matzek and Sabin Ceballos. At the end of the season, the Braves declined the option on Jackson's contract, making him a free agent.

=== Texas Rangers (second stint) ===
On February 17, 2025, Jackson signed a one-year, $1.5 million contract with the Texas Rangers. He was the team's closer early in the season. In 39 appearances for the Rangers, he had a 2–5 record and 4.11 ERA with 24 strikeouts and 9 saves over 35 innings of work. Jackson was designated for assignment by Texas on July 23. He was released by the team the following day.

=== Detroit Tigers ===
On July 26, 2025, Jackson signed a one-year, major league contract with the Detroit Tigers for a prorated portion of the major league minimum salary. The Rangers were still responsible for the remainder of Jackson's 2025 contract. In three appearances for Detroit, he struggled to a 7.71 ERA with four strikeouts across 4 2/3 innings pitched. Jackson was designated for assignment by the Tigers on August 8; he elected free agency two days later.

=== Seattle Mariners ===
On August 21, 2025, Jackson signed a minor league contract with the Seattle Mariners. In three appearances for the Triple-A Tacoma Rainiers, he struggled to a 7.71 ERA with four strikeouts across 2 1/3 innings pitched. On September 1, the Mariners selected Jackson's contract, adding him to their active roster. In 10 games for Seattle during the final month of the season, he allowed 6 runs (only 3 of them earned) and struck out 10 in 11 1/3 innings. He was on the Mariners' roster for the ALDS and ALCS.

=== New York Mets ===
On April 4, 2026, Jackson signed a minor league contract with the New York Mets. He made five appearances for the Triple-A Syracuse Mets, posting an 0-1 record and 11.57 ERA with two strikeouts across 4 2/3 innings pitched; he also logged three scoreless appearances for the Single-A St. Lucie Mets. On May 16, Jackson triggered the opt-out clause in his contract, and was released by the Mets the following day.

=== Kansas City Royals ===
On May 22, 2026, Jackson signed a minor league contract with the Kansas City Royals. In 10 appearances for the Triple-A Omaha Storm Chasers, he compiled a 1–0 record and 5.27 ERA with 16 strikeouts across 13 2/3 innings pitched. Jackson was released by the Royals organization on June 23.

== Personal life ==
Jackson is married. Their son was born in September 2021. He cuddled his son after pitching in Game 3 of the 2021 World Series.
