= 2019 St. Louis Cardinals season =

Major League Baseball season

2019 St. Louis Cardinals
- National League Central champions
- League: National League
- Division: Central
- Ballpark: Busch Stadium
- City: St. Louis, Missouri
- Record: 91–71 (.562)
- Divisional place: 1st
- Owners: William O. DeWitt Jr
- General managers: Mike Girsch
- Managers: Mike Shildt
- Television: Fox Sports Midwest (Dan McLaughlin, Rick Horton, Tim McCarver, Jim Edmonds, Brad Thompson)
- Radio: KMOX NewsRadio 1120; St. Louis Cardinals Radio Network (Mike Shannon, John Rooney, Rick Horton, Mike Claiborne)
- Stats: ESPN.com; Baseball Reference

The 2019 St. Louis Cardinals season was the 138th for the St. Louis Cardinals of Major League Baseball (MLB), a franchise in St. Louis, Missouri. It was the 128th season for the Cardinals in the National League (NL), and their 14th at Busch Stadium III. On September 22, 2019, the Cardinals defeated the Chicago Cubs 3–2 to clinch their first playoff berth since 2015. On September 29, the Cardinals clinched the National League Central for the first time since 2015, and defeated the Atlanta Braves in the NLDS on October 9. They went on to play the Washington Nationals in the NLCS, but were swept in four games. As of 2026, this is the most recent season that the Cardinals have won a postseason series.

== Season standings ==
=== National League Central ===
NL Central
Team	W	L	Pct.	GB	Home	Road
St. Louis Cardinals	91	71	.562	—	50‍–‍31	41‍–‍40
Milwaukee Brewers	89	73	.549	2	49‍–‍32	40‍–‍41
Chicago Cubs	84	78	.519	7	51‍–‍30	33‍–‍48
Cincinnati Reds	75	87	.463	16	41‍–‍40	34‍–‍47
Pittsburgh Pirates	69	93	.426	22	35‍–‍46	34‍–‍47

=== National League playoff standings ===
Division leaders
Team	W	L	Pct.
Los Angeles Dodgers	106	56	.654
Atlanta Braves	97	65	.599
St. Louis Cardinals	91	71	.562

Wild Card teams (Top 2 teams qualify for postseason)
Team	W	L	Pct.	GB
Washington Nationals	93	69	.574	+4
Milwaukee Brewers	89	73	.549	—
New York Mets	86	76	.531	3
Arizona Diamondbacks	85	77	.525	4
Chicago Cubs	84	78	.519	5
Philadelphia Phillies	81	81	.500	8
San Francisco Giants	77	85	.475	12
Cincinnati Reds	75	87	.463	14
Colorado Rockies	71	91	.438	18
San Diego Padres	70	92	.432	19
Pittsburgh Pirates	69	93	.426	20
Miami Marlins	57	105	.352	32

=== Record vs. opponents ===
2019 National League record Source: MLB Standings Grid – 2019
Team	AZ	ATL	CHC	CIN	COL	LAD	MIA	MIL	NYM	PHI	PIT	SD	SF	STL	WSH	AL
Arizona	—	4–3	2–4	3–3	9–10	8–11	3–4	2–5	2–5	4–2	6–1	11–8	10–9	3–3	4–3	14–6
Atlanta	3–4	—	5–2	3–4	3–3	2–4	15–4	3–3	11–8	9–10	5–2	5–2	5–2	4–2	11–8	13–7
Chicago	4–2	2–5	—	8–11	3–3	3–4	6–1	9–10	5–2	2–5	11–8	4–3	4–2	9–10	2–4	12–8
Cincinnati	3–3	4–3	11–8	—	3–3	1–5	6–1	8–11	3–4	3–4	7–12	5–2	4–3	7–12	1–5	9–11
Colorado	10–9	3–3	3–3	3–3	—	4–15	5–2	5–2	2–4	3–4	2–5	11–8	7–12	2–5	3–4	8–12
Los Angeles	11–8	4–2	4–3	5–1	15–4	—	5–1	4–3	5–2	5–2	6–0	13–6	12–7	3–4	4–3	10–10
Miami	4–3	4–15	1–6	1–6	2–5	1–5	—	2–5	6–13	10–9	3–3	4–2	3–3	3–4	4–15	9–11
Milwaukee	5–2	3–3	10–9	11–8	2–5	3–4	5–2	—	5–1	4–3	15–4	3–4	2–4	9–10	4–2	8–12
New York	5–2	8–11	2–5	4–3	4–2	2–5	13–6	1–5	—	7–12	5–1	3–3	3–4	2–5	12–7	15–5
Philadelphia	2–4	10–9	5–2	4–3	4–3	2–5	9–10	3–4	12–7	—	4–2	3–3	3–4	4–2	5–14	11–9
Pittsburgh	1–6	2–5	8–11	12–7	5–2	0–6	3–3	4–15	1–5	2–4	—	6–1	5–2	5–14	3–4	12–8
San Diego	8–11	2–5	3–4	2–5	8–11	6–13	2–4	4–3	3–3	3–3	1–6	—	9–10	4–2	4–3	11–9
San Francisco	9–10	2–5	2–4	3–4	12–7	7–12	3–3	4–2	4–3	4–3	2–5	10–9	—	3–4	1–5	11–9
St. Louis	3–3	2–4	10–9	12–7	5–2	4–3	4–3	10–9	5–2	2–4	14–5	2–4	4–3	—	5–2	9–11
Washington	3–4	8–11	4–2	5–1	4–3	3–4	15–4	2–4	7–12	14–5	4–3	3–4	5–1	2–5	—	14–6

== Season summary ==
On Opening Day, versus the Milwaukee Brewers, catcher Yadier Molina extended his team-record for Opening Day starts with 15. However, the Cardinals would lose the game 5–4. The following game, newly acquired first baseman Paul Goldschmidt homered three times in a 9−5 win over the Brewers, making him the fastest player to hit a three-home run game with a new team. He also drove in five runs. This would be the only game the Cardinals would win in the 4-game series.

April would start out strong for the Cardinals with them winning 7 out of their 9 first games of the month, including a sweep of the Los Angeles Dodgers. The following series would be more rough, with them splitting a 2-game series against the Cincinnati Reds and going 1–2 in a series against the Milwaukee Brewers (where right fielder Tyler O'Neil and pitcher Mike Mikolas would both be injured) and causing them to lose their first-place position and fall to third. After another loss against the New York Mets on April 19, they would go back on a winning streak winning 9 of their last 10 games. However, center fielder Harrison Bader would be injured on April 17 and just 2 days later pitcher Michael Wacha would be injured, but he would be reactivated 10 days later. At the end of the month the Cardinals would have a 19–10 record with a .655 winning percentage, the best in the league.

The first two games of May were finishing up a 4-game series against the Washington Nationals, which the Cardinals took 3 of the 4 games. The Cardinals were 3 games ahead of the second place team the Chicago Cubs (their arch rival) which they would be playing against next. But things would turn southward for the Cardinals as they would be swept by them. This would be followed by a 3-game series against the Philadelphia Phillies, the leader of the NL East division, which they would only win one game out of. Now having fallen back to third, they would have to play a 4-game series against the Pittsburgh Pirates, the 4th place team in their division. Despite a 17–4 win to kick off the series, they would lose the next 3 games and fall to fourth place. For the following 5 series against the Atlanta Braves (twice), Texas Rangers, Kansas City Royals, and Philadelphia Phillies, they would only win 1 game of each and lose the rest leading to a 5–9 record. With a win against the Chicago Cubs to close the month, they would end it 9-18 for a record of 28–28 as they struggled to keep their record above .500. Also on the last day, catcher Yadier Molina was injured and would be out for 10 days.

The first two games of June were against the Chicago Cubs which the Cardinals would sweep. But after splitting a two-game series against the Reds, the Cardinals would face the Cubs once again, but this time they were swept. During this series on June 8, rookie shortstop Tommy Edman would be called up from the AAA Memphis Redbirds. The following 2 series against the Miami Marlins and New York Mets seemed to be a return to normal. Although pitcher Adam Wainwright was injured in the first game against the Marlins, the Cardinals would be able to beat them. They would also win the second game when Yadier Molina returned, but would lose the third 9-0 and be limited to just 2 hits. With this being against the worst team in the NL, it was particularly hard. They would win the series against the New York Mets 3-1 and play against the Marlins again and split the series 2–2 with Tommy Edman hitting his first home in the MLB in the final game on June 20, though they would still lose 7–6. They had been 10-8 so far in the month and had advanced backup to third place and were 3 games out of first with 8 games left in the month. They won their next 2 games against the Los Angeles Dodgers and were now one game out of first. But, they would go on a 5-game losing streak after this and be outscored 30-10 playing one last game against the Dodgers and two against the Oakland Athletics and San Diego Padres. The final game of the season was against the Padres which they would win ending the month 13-13 making their record 41-41, again at .500. During this time left fielder Marcell Ozuna would be injured leading to Tyler O'Neill to be recalled from the minors.

Before the All-Star Game, the Cardinals would go 2–1 against the Seattle Mariners and 1–2 against the San Francisco Giants leading to have a record of 44-44 going into the break. The Cardinals were still in third, but now just two games out of first place. On July 11, a day before the first game back, Yadier Molina would be put back on the DL while 3rd baseman Matt Carpenter would be taken off. Coming back from the break the Cardinals would be red hot through the rest of the month. They would win their first series 2–1 against the Arizona Diamondbacks followed by a 2–1 series against the Pittsburgh Pirates (when they would briefly jump into third). But after this, they would go 8-1 going 3–1 against the Cincinnati Reds and sweeping the Pirate's (along with one win against the Houston Astros). With this they had propelled themselves back into first, but only by one game. After losing the final two matches against the Astros and going 1–1 against the Cubs, they would be tied for first. They went 16–9 in the month making their record 57–50 with two months to go in the season. This all with a strong of injuries causing Matt Carpenter, Marcell Ozuna, and Harrison Bader to be sent down to the minors.

After a win against the Cubs to close out the series, the Cardinals would go on another 5 game losing streak, being swept by the Oakland Athletics and Los Angeles Dodgers and as a result fell back to third. However, the Cardinals would make up for this and go on a 5-game winning streak sweeping the Pittsburgh Pirates and Kansas City Royals. They were helped by the fact that Matt Carpenter, Yadier Molina and Harrison Bader were all added back to the roster. After splitting a 4-game series with the Reds and going 2–1 against the Milwaukee Brewers, The cardinals would go on another 6 game winning streak, sweeping the Colorado Rockies and winning 2 more against the Brewers. After another loss against the Brewers, the Cardinals would win both games of a double-header against the Cincinnati Reds. With an 18–9 record (and only losing 4 games from August 9–31), they now had a 73–58 record and were 3 games in front of the second place team Chicago Cubs.

The Cardinals continued their winning streak, winning a series against the San Francisco Giants 3-1 and Pittsburgh Pirates 2–1, moving themselves to 4 games ahead in first. However, their next two series wouldn't be as good, with them losing 1–2 against the Colorado Rockies and Milwaukee Brewers. Meanwhile, the Cubs went on a 4-game winning streak meaning the Cardinals were now just 2 games ahead in first. The next series against the Washington Nationals the Cardinals would win 2-1 while the Cubs win streak would snap and they would fall back one game. Meanwhile, the Brewers went on their own 4-game winning streak meaning they were now tied with the Chicago Cubs and in running for the Wild Card spot. With 10 games left in the season, the team the Cardinals would playing against in the series would be the Chicago Cubs. If the Cardinals swept the Cubs, then they would clinch into the playoffs. If the Cubs swept the Cardinals, they would be pushed back to second.

In the first game, the Cardinals took a 4–1 lead in the 6th inning. after two scoreless inning, pitcher Carlos Martinez was brought in to close the match in the bottom of the 9th. He would give up 1 walk and 3 hits allowing the Cubs to come back to 4–3 with one out and a man on third. A pitching change would allow Andrew Miller to come in and get the final two outs, but still allow the tying run to come in making it 4–4 with extra innings. In the 10th inning, Matt Carpenter would hit a home run and make it 5-4 Cardinals bringing them back to the same situation. Pitcher Giovanny Gallegos would be brought in to close the game. He would get 3 consecutive outs leading to a Cardinal victory. The Brewers would also win pushing the Cubs down to third. In the second game, the Cubs would take the early 1–0 lead in the second inning. In the 6th inning with the bases loaded by walks, Yadier Molina would come up and hit a single leading to Marcell Ozuna and Matt Carpenter to score making it 2-1 Cardinals. After 3 scoreless innings, the Cardinals would win.

The third game would be more indecisive. After a groundout by Paul Goldschmidt allowed Tommy Edman to score, Cardinals pitcher Dakota Hudson would give up a single and four walks. After a sacrifice fly, the Cubs would be up 3–1. The game would swing back and forth with by the 4th inning the Cardinals being up 5–3 before a two-run homer by Ian Happ would make it 5-5. By the 7th inning the Cardinals retook the lead 7–6 with a two-run homer off of Marcell Ozuna, but the Cubs would retake it in the bottom of the same inning making it 8–7. With no runs in the 8th inning, Craig Kimbrel would come up to pitch for the Cubs. Yadier Molina was the first hitter and the first pitch thrown to him was hammered to left-center tying the game 8-8. Paul DeJong was up next, and the first pitch thrown at him (the second of the inning) was hit also to left-center putting the Cardinals on top 9–8. Following a scoreless bottom of the 9th, the Cardinals would win and be one game away from clinching into the playoffs. The Cubs once again took the lead in the 6th inning at 2–1, but in the 9th inning they once again came back and won it 3–2, clinching the playoff spot. It was the first time the Cardinals swept the Cubs in a 4-game series at Wrigley since the 1930s.

After another win against the Arizona Diamondbacks, the Cardinals would close out a 6-game winning streak and end up losing the next two games of the series. Meanwhile, the Milwaukee Brewers were on a 6-game winning streak and had clinched a playoff berth. Going into the final 3-game series of the season against the Chicago Cubs again, the Brewers were one game behind first place. The Cardinals would lose the first game, but the Brewers would as well. The second game the Cardinals would lose as well extending their losing streak to 4, but the Brewers also lost theirs. In the final game of the season, the Cardinals would beat the Cubs 9–0 with Jack Flaherty pitching 7 innings and only allowing 2 hits. The Brewers would lose their game, but it didn't matter as the Cardinals clinched the division and would go to the postseason. They ended the month 15-12 for a final record of 91–71, which was the lowest number of wins out of any first place team.

== Game log ==
=== Regular season ===
Legend
Cardinals Win	Cardinals Loss	Game postponed
Boldface text denotes a Cardinals pitcher

2019 St. Louis Cardinals Game Log, 91–71 (.562)
March: 1–3 (.250) (Home: 0–0; Away: 1–3)

#	Date	Opponent	Score	Win	Loss	Save	Attendance	Record	Box / L10
1	March 28	@Brewers	4–5	Chacín (1–0)	**Mikolas** (0–1)	Hader (1)	45,304	0–1	L1
2	March 29	@Brewers	9–5	**Gant** (1–0)	Williams (0–1)		30,157	1–1	W1
3	March 30	@Brewers	2–4	Woodruff (1–0)	**Hudson** (0–1)	Hader (2)	36,655	1–2	L1
4	March 31	@Brewers	4–5	Barnes (1–0)	**Hicks** (0–1)		35,042	1–3	L2

April: 18–7 (.720) (Home: 12–4; Away: 6–3)

#	Date	Opponent	Score	Win	Loss	Save	Attendance	Record	Box / L10
5	April 1	@Pirates	6–5 (12)	**Hicks** (1–1)	Brault (0–1)	**Gant** (1)	37,336	2–3	W1
6	April 3	@Pirates	5–4 (10)	**Gant** (2–0)	Burdi (0–1)	**Hudson** (1)	23,954	3–3	W2
–	April 4	Padres	**Postponed (inclement weather)** (Makeup date: April 5th)						
7	April 5	Padres	3–5	Stock (1–0)	**Reyes** (0–1)	Yates (4)	46,615	3–4	L1
8	April 6	Padres	4–6	Wisler (1–0)	**Miller** (0–1)	Yates (5)	44,492	3–5	L2
9	April 7	Padres	4–1	**Wainwright** (1–0)	Strahm (0–2)	**Hicks** (1)	44,340	4–5	W1
10	April 8	Dodgers	4–3	**Mikolas** (1–1)	Kelly (1–2)	**Hicks** (2)	35,858	5–5	W2
11	April 9	Dodgers	4–0	**Brebbia** (1–0)	Stripling (0–1)		36,353	6–5	W3
12	April 10	Dodgers	7–2	**Flaherty** (1–0)	Maeda (2–1)		36,244	7–5	W4
13	April 11	Dodgers	11–7	**Gallegos** (1–0)	Báez (0–1)		38,200	8–5	W5
14	April 13	@Reds*	2–5	Hughes (1–0)	**Wainwright** (1–1)	Iglesias (2)	16,496	8–6	L1
15	April 14	@Reds*	9–5	**Gant** (3–0)	Garrett (1–1)	**Hicks** (3)	16,793	9–6	W1
16	April 15	@Brewers	7–10	Guerra (1–0)	**Mayers** (0–1)		28,199	9–7	L1
17	April 16	@Brewers	4–8	Woodruff (2–1)	**Flaherty** (1–1)		30,260	9–8	L2
18	April 17	@Brewers	6–3	**Wacha** (1–0)	Burnes (0–2)	**Hicks** (4)	29,817	10–8	W1
19	April 19	Mets	5–4	Lugo (1–0)	**Wainwright** (1–2)	**Díaz** (7)	40,413	10–9	L1
20	April 20	Mets	10–2	**Mikolas** (2–1)	Flexen (0–1)		47,059	11–9	W1
21	April 21	Mets	6–4	**Hudson** (1-1)	Syndergaard (1–2)	**Hicks** (5)	42,765	12–9	W2
22	April 22	Brewers	13–5	**Flaherty** (2–1)	Houser (0–1)		35,819	13–9	W3
23	April 23	Brewers	4–3	**Miller** (1–1)	Wilson (1–1)	**Hicks** (6)	38,474	14–9	W4
24	April 24	Brewers	5–2	**Wainwright** (2–2)	Chacín (2–3)	**Hicks** (7)	36,878	15–9	W5
25	April 26	Reds	1–12	DeSclafani (1–1)	**Mikolas** (2–2)		45,087	15–10	L1
26	April 27	Reds	6–3	**Hudson** (2–1)	Mahle (0–3)	**Hicks** (8)	44,197	16–10	W1
27	April 28	Reds	5–2	**Flaherty** (3–1)	Gray (0–4)	**Gant** (2)	45,701	17–10	W2
28	April 29	@Nationals	6–3	**Wacha** (2–0)	Corbin (2–1)	**Hicks** (9)	17,890	18–10	W3
29	April 30	@Nationals	3–2	**Wainwright** (3–2)	Sánchez (0–4)	**Miller** (1)	19,753	19–10	W4
*April 13 and 14 games played in Monterrey, Mexico

May: 9–18 (.333) (Home: 4–7; Away: 5–11)

#	Date	Opponent	Score	Win	Loss	Save	Attendance	Record	Box / L10
30	May 1	@Nationals	5–1	**Mikolas** (3–2)	Scherzer (1–4)	—	22,157	20–10	W5
31	May 2	@Nationals	1–2	Strasburg (3–1)	**Hudson** (2–2)	Doolittle (4)	24,338	20–11	L1
32	May 3	@Cubs	0–4	Hendricks (2–4)	**Flaherty** (3–2)	—	34,978	20–12	L2
33	May 4	@Cubs	5–6	Kintzler (1– 0)	**Brebbia** (1–1)	Strop (4)	39,601	20–13	L3
34	May 5	@Cubs	5–13	Quintana (4–1)	**Wainwright** (3–3)		36,499	20–14	L4
35	May 6	Phillies	6–0	**Mikolas** (4–2)	Velasquez (1–2)		38,419	21–14	W1
36	May 7	Phillies	1–11	Nola (3–0)	**Hudson** (2– 3)		38,562	21–15	L1
37	May 8	Phillies	0–5	Eickhoff (2–1)	**Flaherty** (3–3)		42,309	21–16	L2
38	May 9	Pirates	17–4	**Wacha** (3–0)	Musgrove (1–4)		38,925	22–16	W1
39	May 10	Pirates	1–2	Williams (2–1)	**Miller** (1–2)	Vázquez (11)	45,060	22–17	L1
40	May 11	Pirates	1–2	Lyles (3–1)	**Mikolas** (4–3)	Vázquez (12)	43,011	22–18	L2
41	May 12	Pirates	6–10	Stratton (1–2)	**Brebbia** (1–2)		48,555	22–19	L3
42	May 14	@Braves	14–3	**Flaherty** (4–3)	Foltynewicz (0–3)		23,718	23–19	W1
43	May 15	@Braves	0–4	Soroka (4–1)	**Wacha** (3– 1)	Jackson (5)	23,367	23–20	L1
44	May 16	@Braves	2–10	Teherán (3–4)	**Wainwright** (3–4)		28,783	23–21	L2
45	May 17	@Rangers	3–7	Sampson (1–3)	**Mikolas** (4–4)		34,398	23–22	L3
46	May 18	@Rangers	8–2	**Hudson** (3– 3)	Jurado (1– 2)		30,967	24–22	W1
47	May 19	@Rangers	4–5 (10)	Gómez (1–0)	**Hicks** (1–2)		32,112	24–23	L1
–	May 21	Royals	Postponed (rain) Makeup: May 22						
48	May 22	Royals	2–8	Keller (3–5)	**Wacha** (3– 2)		42,725	24–24	L2
49	May 22	Royals	10–3	**Wainwright** (4–4)	Bailey (4–5)		42,529	25–24	W1
50	May 24	Braves	2–5	Foltynewicz (1–3)	**Mikolas** (4–5)		44,630	25–25	L1
51	May 25	Braves	6–3	**Miller** (2–2)	Winkler (1–1)	**Hicks** (10)	45,760	26–25	W1
52	May 26	Braves	3–4	Webb (3–0)	**Webb** (0–1)	Jackson (7)	45,152	26–26	L1
53	May 28	@Phillies	3–4	Pivetta (3–1)	**Wainwright** (4–5)	Neris (10)	29,084	26–27	L2
54	May 29	@Phillies	4–11	Nola (6–0)	**Cabrera** (0–1)		30,486	26–28	L3
55	May 30	@Phillies	5–3	**Hudson** (4–3)	Eickhoff (2–3)	**Hicks** (11)	31,206	27–28	W1
56	May 31	Cubs	2–1 (10)	**Hicks** (2–2)	Montgomery (1–1)		45,321	28–28	W2

June: 13–13 (.500) (Home: 7–6; Away: 6–7)

#	Date	Opponent	Score	Win	Loss	Save	Attendance	Record	Box / L10
57	June 1	Cubs	7–4	**Gant** (4–0)	Chatwood (3–1)	**Martínez** (1)	46,297	29–28	W3
58	June 2	Cubs	2–1	**Wainwright** (5–5)	Hamels (4–2)	**Gant** (3)	46,053	30–28	W4
59	June 4	Reds	1–4	Castillo (6–1)	**Cabrera** (0–2)	Iglesias (12)	40,649	30–29	L1
–	June 5	Reds	Postponed (rain) Makeup: August 31						
60	June 6	Reds	3–1	**Gant** (5–0)	Lorenzen (0–1)	**Hicks** (12)	44,654	31–29	W1
61	June 7	@Cubs	1–3	Hamels (5–2)	**Mikolas** (4–6)	Strop (6)	40,671	31–30	L1
62	June 8	@Cubs	4–9	Lester (5–4)	**Brebbia** (1–3)	—	41,005	31–31	L2
63	June 9	@Cubs	1–5	Hendricks (7–4)	**Wainwright** (5–6)	Strop (7)	39,545	31–32	L3
64	June 10	@Marlins	4–1	**Wacha** (4–2)	Alcántara (3–6)	**Hicks** (13)	6,585	32–32	W1
65	June 11	@Marlins	7–1	**Hudson** (5–3)	Hernández (0–1)	—	6,308	33–32	W2
66	June 12	@Marlins	0–9	Yamamoto (1–0)	**Mikolas** (4–7)	—	7,001	33–33	L1
–	June 13	@Mets	Suspended (rain) Continuation: June 14						
67	June 14	@Mets	5–4 (10)	**Martínez** (1–0)	Díaz (1–4)	**Hicks** (14)	31,862	34–33	W1
68	June 14	@Mets	9–5	**Gant** (6–0)	Familia (2–1)	—	28,560	35–33	W2
69	June 15	@Mets	7–8	Syndergaard (5–4)	**Wacha** (4–3)	Díaz (15)	32,589	35–34	L1
70	June 16	@Mets	4–3	**Miller** (3–2)	Flexen (0–3)	**Martínez** (2)	37,054	36–34	W1
71	June 17	Marlins	5–0	**Mikolas** (5–7)	Hernández (0–2)	—	41,274	37–34	W2
72	June 18	Marlins	0–6	Yamamoto (2–0)	**Flaherty** (4–4)	—	41,467	37–35	L1
73	June 19	Marlins	2–1 (11)	**Gant** (7–0)	Conley (1–7)	—	40,126	38–35	W1
74	June 20	Marlins	6–7 (11)	García (1–0)	**Miller** (3–3)	Romo (13)	42,446	38–36	L1
75	June 21	Angels	5–1	**Wacha** (5–3)	Canning (2–4)	—	48,423	39–36	W1
76	June 22	Angels	4–2	**Hudson** (6–3)	Peña (5–2)	**Webb** (1)	46,711	40–36	W2
77	June 23	Angels	4–6	Skaggs (7–6)	**Mikolas** (5–8)	—	47,114	40–37	L1
78	June 25	Athletics	3–7	Wendelken (1–1)	**Flaherty** (4–5)	—	40,556	40–38	L2
79	June 26	Athletics	0–2	Mengden (2–1)	**Wainwright** (5–7)	Hendriks (2)	44,871	40–39	L3
80	June 28	@Padres	1–3	Quantrill (2–2)	**Wacha** (5–4)	Yates (27)	33,329	40–40	L4
81	June 29	@Padres	2–12	Paddack (5–4)	**Hudson** (6–4)	—	44,407	40–41	L5
82	June 30	@Padres	5–3	**Martínez** (2–0)	Wieck (0–1)	Leone (1)	32,375	41–41	W1

July: 16–9 (.640) (Home: 6–5; Away: 10–4)

#	Date	Opponent	Score	Win	Loss	Save	Attendance	Record	Box / L10
83	July 2	@Mariners	4–5	Adams (1–0)	**Gallegos** (1–1)	Elías (11)	20,173	41–42	L1
84	July 3	@Mariners	5–2	**Brebbia** (2–3)	Adams (1–1)		31,878	42–42	W1
85	July 4	@Mariners	5–4	**Ponce de Leon** (1–0)	Milone (1–3)	**Martínez** (3)	26,656	43–42	W2
86	July 5	@Giants	9–4	**Hudson** (7–4)	Pomeranz (2–9)	—	37,603	44–42	W3
87	July 6	@Giants	4–8	Dyson (3–1)	**Mikolas** (5–9)	—	32,487	44–43	L1
88	July 7	@Giants	0–1	Samardzija (6–7)	**Flaherty** (4–6)	Smith (23)	33,481	44–44	L2
**90th All-Star Game in Cleveland, OH**
89	July 12	Diamondbacks	2–4	Ray (7–6)	**Miller** (3–4)	Holland (15)	44,960	44–45	L3
90	July 13	Diamondbacks	4–2	**Hudson** (8–4)	Kelly (7–9)	**Martínez** (4)	46,152	45–45	W1
91	July 14	Diamondbacks	5–2	**Wainwright** (6–7)	Greinke (10–4)	**Martínez** (5)	43,439	46–45	W2
92	July 15	Pirates	7–0	**Mikolas** (6–9)	Musgrove (6–8)	—	41,965	47–45	W3
93	July 16	Pirates	1–3	Liriano (4–1)	**Martínez** (2–1)	Vázquez (21)	43,777	47–46	L1
94	July 17	Pirates	6–5	**Brebbia** (3–3)	Liriano (4–2)	**Martínez** (6)	43,186	48–46	W1
95	July 18	@Reds	7–4	**Hudson** (9–4)	Stephenson (2–2)	**Miller** (2)	32,359	49–46	W2
96	July 19	@Reds	12–11	**Wacha** (6–4)	Hughes (3–3)	**Martínez** (7)	37,652	50–46	W3
97	July 20	@Reds	2–3	Garrett (4–1)	**Mikolas** (6–10)	Lorenzen (6)	38,427	50–47	L1
98	July 21	@Reds	3–1	**Gallegos** (2–1)	DeSclafani (5–5)	**Martínez** (8)	28,763	51–47	W1
99	July 22	@Pirates	6–5 (10)	**Shreve** (1–0)	Holmes (1–1)	**Martínez** (9)	13,096	52–47	W2
100	July 23	@Pirates	4–3	**Hudson** (10–4)	Archer (3–7)	**Miller** (3)	15,778	53–47	W3
101	July 24	@Pirates	14–8	**Wainwright** (7–7)	Lyles (5–7)	—	18,675	54–47	W4
102	July 25	@Pirates	6–3	**Mikolas** (7–10)	Musgrove (7–9)	—	24,534	55–47	W5
103	July 26	Astros	5–3	**Miller** (4–4)	Pressly (2–2)	**Martínez** (10)	44,724	56–47	W6
104	July 27	Astros	2–8	Cole (12–5)	**Ponce de Leon** (1–1)	—	46,518	56–48	L1
105	July 28	Astros	2–6	Miley (9–4)	**Hudson** (10–5)	—	46,714	56–49	L2
106	July 30	Cubs	2–1	**Gallegos** (3–1)	Darvish (3–5)	**Martínez** (11)	46,123	57–49	W1
107	July 31	Cubs	0–2	Hendricks (8–8)	**Mikolas** (7–11)	Kimbrel (8)	43,750	57–50	L1

August: 18–9 (.667) (Home: 12–1; Away: 6–8)

#	Date	Opponent	Score	Win	Loss	Save	Attendance	Record	Box / L10
108	August 1	Cubs	8–0	**Flaherty** (5–6)	Lester (9–7)	—	46,811	58–50	W1
109	August 3	@Athletics	3–8	Fiers (10–3)	**Hudson** (10–6)	—	24,851	58–51	L1
110	August 4	@Athletics	2–4	Roark (7–7)	**Wainwright** (7–8)	Hendriks (11)	24,603	58–52	L2
111	August 5	@Dodgers	0–8	Gonsolin (1–1)	**Wacha** (6–5)	—	45,254	58–53	L3
112	August 6	@Dodgers	1–3	Kershaw (11–2)	**Mikolas** (7–12)	Jansen (26)	53,070	58–54	L4
113	August 7	@Dodgers	1–2	Sadler (2–0)	**Martínez** (2–2)	—	48,994	58–55	L5
114	August 9	Pirates	6–2	**Martínez** (3–2)	Rodríguez (3–5)	—	42,757	59–55	W1
115	August 10	Pirates	3–1	**Wainwright** (8–8)	Musgrove (8–11)	**Martínez** (12)	45,026	60–55	W2
116	August 11	Pirates	11–9	**Gant** (8–0)	Crick (3–7)	**Miller** (4)	43,912	61–55	W3
117	August 13	@Royals	2–0	**Flaherty** (6–6)	Sparkman (3–8)	**Martínez** (13)	23,563	62–55	W4
118	August 14	@Royals	6–0	**Hudson** (11–6)	Keller (7–13)	—	22,494	63–55	W5
119	August 15	@Reds	1–2	Gray (8–6)	**Wacha** (6–6)	Iglesias (24)	14,891	63–56	L1
120	August 16	@Reds	13–4	**Wainwright** (9–8)	Castillo (11–5)	—	24,118	64–56	W1
121	August 17	@Reds	1–6	DeSclafani (8–7)	**Mikolas** (7–13)	—	37,698	64–57	L1
122	August 18	@Reds	5–4	**Flaherty** (7–6)	Wood (1–2)	**Martínez** (14)	21,525	65–57	W1
123	August 19	Brewers	3–0	**Hudson** (12–6)	Davies (8–6)	**Miller** (5)	44,843	66–57	W2
124	August 20	Brewers	9–4	**Webb** (1–1)	Jeffress (3–4)	—	37,823	67-57	W3
125	August 21	Brewers	3–5 (8)	Houser (6–5)	**Wainwright** (9–9)	Guerra (3)	40,250	67–58	L1
126	August 22	Rockies	6–5	**Leone** (1–0)	Almonte (0–1)	**Martínez** (15)	36,465	68–58	W1
127	August 23	Rockies	8–3	**Flaherty** (8–6)	Lambert (2–4)	—	40,829	69–58	W2
128	August 24	Rockies	6–0	**Hudson** (13–6)	Gonzalez (0–5)	—	42,102	70–58	W3
129	August 25	Rockies	11–4	**Helsley** (1–0)	Senzatela (8–8)	—	45,551	71–58	W4
130	August 26	@Brewers	12–2	**Gant** (9–0)	González (2–2)	—	29,475	72–58	W5
131	August 27	@Brewers	6–3	**Mikolas** (8–13)	Albers (5–4)	**Martínez** (16)	36,690	73–58	W6
132	August 28	@Brewers	1–4	Lyles (9–8)	**Flaherty** (8–7)	Hader (26)	33,045	73–59	L1
—	August 30	Reds	Postponed (rain) Makeup: September 1						
133	August 31	Reds	10–6	**Hudson** (14–6)	Bauer (10–12)	—	44,738	74–59	W1
134	August 31	Reds	3–2	**Gant** (10–0)	Iglesias (2–11)	—	42,074	75–59	W2

September: 16–12 (.571) (Home: 8–7; Away: 8–5)

#	Date	Opponent	Score	Win	Loss	Save	Attendance	Record	Box / L10
135	September 1	Reds	4–3	**Martínez** (4–2)	Lorenzen (0–4)	—	43,692	76–59	W3
136	September 1	Reds	3–5	Castillo (14–5)	**Ponce de Leon** (1–2)	Iglesias (28)	38,665	76–60	L1
137	September 2	Giants	3–1	**Wainwright** (10–9)	Beede (3–9)	**Martínez** (17)	40,732	77–60	W1
138	September 3	Giants	1–0	**Flaherty** (9–7)	Rodríguez (5–8)	**Martínez** (18)	38,259	78–60	W2
139	September 4	Giants	8–9	Rogers (1–0)	**Gallegos** (3–2)	Smith (31)	41,945	78–61	L1
140	September 5	Giants	10–0	**Hudson** (15–6)	Webb (1–1)	**Cabrera** (1)	36,800	79–61	W1
141	September 6	@Pirates	4–9	Wang (3–0)	**Miller** (4–5)	Vázquez (25)	19,090	79–62	L1
142	September 7	@Pirates	10–1	**Wainwright** (11–9)	Brault (4–4)	—	23,996	80–62	W1
143	September 8	@Pirates	2–0	**Flaherty** (10–7)	Marvel (0–1)	**Martínez** (19)	18,363	81–62	W2
144	September 10	@Rockies	1–2	Gonzalez (1–6)	**Wacha** (6–7)	Díaz (2)	31,514	81–63	L1
145	September 11	@Rockies	1–2	Senzatela (9–10)	**Hudson** (15–7)	Díaz (3)	31,931	81–64	L2
146	September 12	@Rockies	10–3	**Mikolas** (9–13)	Melville (2–2)	—	27,618	82–64	W1
147	September 13	Brewers	10–0	**Wainwright** (12–9)	Houser (6–6)	—	47,075	83–64	W2
148	September 14	Brewers	2–5	Lyles (11–8)	**Flaherty** (10–8)	Hader (32)	46,665	83–65	L1
149	September 15	Brewers	6–7	Albers (7–5)	**Gant** (10–1)	Hader (33)	46,722	83–66	L2
150	September 16	Nationals	4–2	**Hudson** (16–7)	Doolittle (6–5)	**Martínez** (20)	42,812	84–66	W1
151	September 17	Nationals	2–6	Corbin (13–7)	**Mikolas** (9–14)	Hudson (4)	44,061	84–67	L1
152	September 18	Nationals	5–1	**Wainwright** (13–9)	Scherzer (10–7)	**Martínez** (21)	37,669	85–67	W1
153	September 19	@Cubs	5–4 (10)	**Miller** (5–5)	Kimbrel (0–3)	**Gallegos** (1)	39,524	86–67	W2
154	September 20	@Cubs	2–1	**Helsley** (2–0)	Phelps (2–1)	**Martínez** (22)	39,106	87–67	W3
155	September 21	@Cubs	9–8	**Gant** (11–1)	Kimbrel (0–4)	**Martínez** (23)	40,071	88–67	W4
156	September 22	@Cubs	3–2	**Webb** (2–1)	Darvish (6–8)	**Miller** (6)	38,606	89–67	W5
157	September 23	@Diamondbacks	9–7	**Wainwright** (14–9)	Young (7–5)	**Martínez** (24)	24,826	90–67	W6
158	September 24	@Diamondbacks	2–3 (19)	Ginkel (3–0)	**Brebbia** (3–4)	—	26,097	90–68	L1
159	September 25	@Diamondbacks	7–9	Kelly (13–14)	**Fernández** (0–1)	Bradley (17)	21,420	90–69	L2
160	September 27	Cubs	2–8	Wieck (2–2)	**Miller** (5–6)	—	46,530	90–70	L3
161	September 28	Cubs	6–8	Cishek (4–6)	**Wainwright** (14–10)	Kintzler (1)	46,971	90–71	L4
162	September 29	Cubs	9–0	**Flaherty** (11–8)	Holland (2–5)	—	47,200	91–71	W1

Legend: = Win = Loss = Postponement
Bold = Cardinals team member

== Player stats ==
=== Batting ===
Note: G = Games played; AB = At bats; R = Runs; H = Hits; 2B = Doubles; 3B = Triples; HR = Home runs; RBI = Runs batted in; SB = Stolen bases; BB = Walks; AVG = Batting average; SLG = Slugging average

Player	G	AB	R	H	2B	3B	HR	RBI	SB	BB	AVG	SLG
Paul Goldschmidt	161	597	97	155	25	1	34	97	3	78	.260	.476
Paul DeJong	159	583	97	136	31	1	30	78	9	62	.233	.444
Dexter Fowler	150	487	69	116	24	1	19	67	8	74	.238	.409
Marcell Ozuna	130	485	80	117	23	1	29	89	12	62	.241	.472
Kolten Wong	148	478	61	136	25	4	11	59	24	47	.285	.423
Yadier Molina	113	419	45	113	24	0	10	57	6	23	.270	.399
Matt Carpenter	129	416	59	94	20	2	15	46	6	63	.226	.392
Harrison Bader	128	347	54	71	14	3	12	39	11	46	.205	.366
José Martínez	128	334	45	90	13	2	10	42	3	35	.269	.410
Tommy Edman	92	326	59	99	17	7	11	36	15	16	.304	.500
Yairo Muñoz	38	172	20	46	7	1	2	13	8	7	.267	.355
Matt Wieters	67	168	15	36	4	0	11	27	1	12	.214	.435
Tyler O'Neill	60	141	18	37	6	0	5	16	1	10	.262	.411
Jedd Gyorko	38	56	5	11	0	0	2	7	2	6	.196	.304
Andrew Knizner	18	53	7	12	2	0	2	7	2	4	.226	.377
Rangel Ravelo	29	39	4	8	2	0	2	7	0	3	.205	.410
Lane Thomas	34	38	6	12	0	1	4	12	1	4	.316	.684
Randy Arozarena	19	20	4	6	1	0	1	2	2	2	.300	.500
Edmundo Sosa	8	8	2	2	0	0	0	0	1	1	.250	.250
Drew Robinson	5	7	1	1	0	0	0	0	0	0	.143	.143
Joe Hudson	1	1	0	0	0	0	0	0	0	0	.000	.000
Pitcher totals	162	274	16	38	8	0	0	13	1	6	.139	.168
**Team totals**	**162**	**5449**	**764**	**1336**	**246**	**24**	**210**	**714**	**116**	**561**	**.245**	**.415**

=== Pitching ===
Note: W = Wins; L = Losses; ERA = Earned run average; G = Games pitched; GS = Games started; SV = Saves; IP = Innings pitched; H = Hits allowed; R = Runs allowed; ER = Earned runs allowed; BB = Walks allowed; SO = Strikeouts

Player	W	L	ERA	G	GS	SV	IP	H	R	ER	BB	SO
Jack Flaherty	11	8	2.75	33	33	0	196.1	135	62	60	55	231
Miles Mikolas	9	14	4.16	32	32	0	184.0	193	90	85	32	144
Dakota Hudson	16	7	3.35	33	32	1	174.2	160	80	65	86	136
Adam Wainwright	14	10	4.19	31	31	0	171.2	181	83	80	64	153
Michael Wacha	6	7	4.76	29	24	0	126.2	143	71	67	55	104
Giovanny Gallegos	3	2	2.31	66	0	1	74.0	44	19	19	16	93
John Brebbia	3	4	3.59	66	0	0	72.2	59	31	29	27	87
John Gant	11	1	3.66	64	0	3	66.1	51	29	27	34	60
Tyler Webb	2	1	3.76	65	0	1	55.0	33	23	23	23	48
Andrew Miller	5	6	4.45	73	0	6	54.2	45	32	27	27	70
Daniel Ponce de Leon	1	2	3.70	13	8	0	48.2	36	21	20	26	52
Carlos Martínez	4	2	3.17	48	0	24	48.1	39	18	17	18	53
Dominic Leone	1	0	5.53	40	0	1	40.2	39	28	25	22	46
Ryan Helsley	2	0	2.95	24	0	0	36.2	34	13	12	12	32
Jordan Hicks	2	2	3.14	29	0	14	28.2	16	10	10	11	31
Génesis Cabrera	0	2	4.87	13	2	1	20.1	23	16	11	11	19
Mike Mayers	0	1	6.63	16	0	0	19.0	21	14	14	11	16
Junior Fernández	0	1	5.40	13	0	0	11.2	9	7	7	6	16
Luke Gregerson	0	0	7.94	6	0	0	5.2	11	5	5	1	2
Alex Reyes	0	1	15.00	4	0	0	3.0	2	5	5	6	1
Adalberto Mejía	0	0	9.00	2	0	0	3.0	8	3	3	1	2
Chasen Shreve	1	0	9.00	3	0	0	2.0	2	2	2	1	2
Jedd Gyorko	0	0	0.00	1	0	0	0.1	0	0	0	0	1
**Team totals**	**91**	**71**	**3.80**	**162**	**162**	**52**	**1444.0**	**1284**	**662**	**609**	**545**	**1399**

=== Postseason ===
2019 Postseason (3–6)
National League Division Series (3–2)

Game	Date	Opponent	Score	Win	Loss	Save	Attendance	Record
1	October 3	@ Braves	7–6	**Martínez** (1–0)	Melancon (0–1)	—	42,631	1–0
2	October 4	@ Braves	0–3	Foltynewicz (1–0)	**Flaherty** (0–1)	Melancon (1)	42,911	1–1
3	October 6	Braves	1–3	Newcomb (1–0)	**Martínez** (1–1)	Melancon (2)	46,701	1–2
4	October 7	Braves	5–4 (10)	**Mikolas** (1–0)	Teherán (0–1)	—	42,203	2–2
5	October 9	@ Braves	13–1	**Flaherty** (1–1)	Foltynewicz (1–1)	—	43,122	3–2

National League Championship Series (0–4)

Game	Date	Opponent	Score	Win	Loss	Save	Attendance	Record
1	October 11	Nationals	0–2	Sánchez (1–0)	**Mikolas** (0–1)	Doolittle (1)	45,075	0–1
2	October 12	Nationals	1–3	Scherzer (1–0)	**Wainwright** (0–1)	Hudson (1)	46,458	0–2
3	October 14	@ Nationals	1–8	Strasburg (1–0)	**Flaherty** (0–1)	—	43,675	0–3
4	October 15	@ Nationals	4–7	Corbin (1–0)	**Hudson** (0–1)	Hudson (2)	43,976	0–4

Legend: = Win = Loss = Postponement
Bold = Cardinals team member

== Postseason rosters ==
Playoff rosters
National League Division Series

- Pitchers: 18 Carlos Martínez 21 Andrew Miller 22 Jack Flaherty 30 Tyler Webb 39 Miles Mikolas 43 Dakota Hudson 50 Adam Wainwright 56 Ryan Helsley 60 John Brebbia 61 Génesis Cabrera 62 Daniel Ponce de Leon 65 Giovanny Gallegos
- Catchers: 4 Yadier Molina 32 Matt Wieters
- Infielders: 12 Paul DeJong 13 Matt Carpenter 16 Kolten Wong 19 Tommy Edman 34 Yairo Muñoz 46 Paul Goldschmidt
- Outfielders: 23 Marcell Ozuna 25 Dexter Fowler 38 José Martínez 48 Harrison Bader 66 Randy Arozarena

National League Championship Series

- Pitchers: 18 Carlos Martínez 21 Andrew Miller 22 Jack Flaherty 30 Tyler Webb 39 Miles Mikolas 43 Dakota Hudson 50 Adam Wainwright 56 Ryan Helsley 60 John Brebbia 61 Génesis Cabrera 62 Daniel Ponce de Leon 65 Giovanny Gallegos
- Catchers: 4 Yadier Molina 32 Matt Wieters
- Infielders: 12 Paul DeJong 13 Matt Carpenter 16 Kolten Wong 19 Tommy Edman 34 Yairo Muñoz 46 Paul Goldschmidt
- Outfielders: 23 Marcell Ozuna 25 Dexter Fowler 38 José Martínez 48 Harrison Bader 66 Randy Arozarena

== Opening Day lineup ==
13	Matt Carpenter	3B
46	Paul Goldschmidt	1B
12	Paul DeJong	SS
23	Marcell Ozuna	LF
4	Yadier Molina	C
25	Dexter Fowler	RF
16	Kolten Wong	2B
48	Harrison Bader	CF
39	Miles Mikolas	P

== Roster ==
2019 St. Louis Cardinals
Roster
Pitchers: 60 John Brebbia; 61 Génesis Cabrera; 44 Junior Fernández; 22 Jack Flaherty; 65 Giovanny Gallegos; 53 John Gant; 44 Luke Gregerson; 56 Ryan Helsley; 49 Jordan Hicks; 43 Dakota Hudson; 55 Dominic Leone; 18 Carlos Martínez; 59 Mike Mayers; 68 Adalberto Mejía; 39 Miles Mikolas; 21 Andrew Miller; 62 Daniel Ponce de Leon; 29 Alex Reyes; 40 Chasen Shreve; 52 Michael Wacha; 50 Adam Wainwright; 30 Tyler Webb	Catchers: 7 Andrew Knizner; 4 Yadier Molina; 32 Matt Wieters; Infielders: 13 Matt Carpenter; 12 Paul DeJong; 19 Tommy Edman; 46 Paul Goldschmidt; 3 Jedd Gyorko; 34 Yairo Muñoz; 47 Rangel Ravelo; 63 Edmundo Sosa; 16 Kolten Wong	Outfielders: 66 Randy Arozarena; 48 Harrison Bader; 25 Dexter Fowler; 38 José Martínez; 41 Tyler O'Neill; 23 Marcell Ozuna; 33 Drew Robinson; 35 Lane Thomas; Other batters: 68 Joe Hudson	Manager: 8 Mike Shildt; Coaches: 54 Jeff Albert (hitting); 58 Mark Budaska (assistant hitting); 11 Stubby Clapp (first base); 72 Bryan Eversgerd (bullpen); 58 Jobel Jiménez (assistant hitting); 31 Mike Maddux (pitching); 37 Oliver Marmol (bench); 51 Willie McGee (assistant coach); 94 Jamie Pogue (bullpen catcher); 76 Kleininger Teran (bullpen catcher); 75 Ron 'Pop' Warner (third base)

== Minor league system and first-year player draft ==
=== Teams ===
Level	Team	League	Division	Manager	W–L/Stats	Standing	Refs
AAA	Memphis Redbirds	Pacific Coast	American–South	Ben Johnson			
AA	Springfield Cardinals	Texas	North	Joe Kruzel			
A+	Palm Beach Cardinals	Florida State	South	Dann Bilardello			
A	Peoria Chiefs	Midwest	Western	Chris Swauger			
A (SS)	State College Spikes	New York–Penn	Pinckney	José León			
Rookie	Johnson City Cardinals	Appalachian	West	Roberto Espinoza			
Rookie	GCL Cardinals	Gulf Coast	East	Steve Turco			
Rookie	DSL Cardinals	Dominican Summer	Boca Chica North	Frey Peniche			

=== Major League Baseball draft ===
The 2019 Major League Baseball (MLB) First-Year Player Draft began on Monday, June 3, 2019, and ended June 5. The draft will assign amateur baseball players to MLB teams.

2019 St. Louis Cardinals complete draft list

Round	Pick	Name, Age	Pos / Bats	School (State)	Date sgnd.	Refs
1	19	Zack Thompson, 21	LHP / L	University of Kentucky (KY)	June 11	
2	58	Trejyn Fletcher, 18	CF / R	Deering HS (ME)	June 13	
3	96	Tony Locey, 20	RHP / R	University of Georgia (GA)	June 12	
4	125	Andre Pallante, 20	RHP / R	University of California, Irvine (CA)	June 19	
5	155	Connor Thomas, 21	LHP / L	Georgia Tech (GA)	June 11	
6	185	Pedro Pagés, 20	C / R	Florida Atlantic University (FL)	June 13	
7	215	Jack Ralston, 21	LHP / R	University of California, Los Angeles (CA)	June 19	
8	245	Logan Gragg, 20	RHP / R	Oklahoma State University (OK)	June 14	
9	275	Todd Lott, 21	OF / R	University of Louisiana at Lafayette (LA)	June 11	
10	305	Jake Sommers, 22	LHP / R	University of Wisconsin–Milwaukee (WI)	June 10	
11	335	Connor Lunn, 20	RHP / R	University of Southern California (CA)	June 19	
12	365	Patrick Romeri, 17	RF / R	IMG Academy (FL)	June 10	
13	395	Tommy Jew, 21	CF / R	University of California, Santa Barbara (CA)	July 9	
14	425	Tyler Statler, 17	RHP / R	Hononegah HS (IL)	June 14	
15	455	David Vinsky, 20	OF / R	Northwood University (MI)	June 11	
16	485	Thomas Hart, 18	RHP / R	Wakeland HS (TX)	June 16	
17	515	Michael YaSenka, 21	RHP / R	Eastern Illinois University (IL)	June 14	
18	545	Aaron Antonini, 20	C / L	Middle Tennessee State University (TN)	N/A	
19	575	Zarion Sharpe, 20	LHP / R	University of North Carolina at Wilmington (NC)	TBA	
20	605	Adrian Mardueno, 21	RHP / R	San Diego State University (CA)	June 12	
21	635	Jack Owen, 21	LHP / L	Auburn University (AL)	TBA	
22	665	Zade Richardson, 19	C / R	Wabash Valley College (IL)	June 16	
23	695	Brylie Ware, 22	3B / R	University of Oklahoma (OK)	June 10	
24	725	Will Guay, 23	RHP / R	Concord University (WV)	June 10	
25	755	Alex McFarlane, 17	RHP / R	Habersham Central School (GA)	Did not sign	
26	785	Jeremy Randolph, 23	RHP / R	University of Alabama (AL)	June 14	
27	815	Eric Lex, 23	RHP / R	Santa Clara University (CA)	June 16	
28	845	Tyler Peck, 21	RHP / R	Chapman University (CA)	N/A	
29	875	Scott Politz, 22	RHP / R	Yale University (CT)	June 11	
30	905	Cameron Dulle, 23	RHP / R	University of Missouri (CA)	June 10	
31	935	Dylan Pearce, 22	RHP / L	Oregon State University (OR)	June 16	
32	965	Chandler Redmond, 22	2B / L	Gardner-Webb University (NC)	June 10	
33	995	Anthony Green, 21	RHP / R	Jefferson College (MO)	June 11	
34	1,025	Ben Baird, 21	SS / R	University of Washington (WA)	June 11	
35	1,055	Logan Hofmann, 19	RHP / L	Colby Community College (KS)	TBA	
36	1,085	Kyle Skeels, 22	C / R	Coastal Carolina University (SC)	June 11	
37	1,115	Chris Newell, 18	OF / L	Malvern Preparatory School (PA)	Did not sign	
38	1,145	Kurtis Byrne, 18	C / R	Christian Brothers College HS (MO)	Did not sign	
39	1,175	T.J. McKenzie, 18	SS / R	The Benjamin School (FL)	Did not sign	
40	1,205	Cash Rugely, 19	SS / R	Navarro College (TX)	TBA	
