= 2019 Cincinnati Reds season =

2019 Cincinnati Reds
- League: National League
- Division: Central
- Ballpark: Great American Ball Park
- City: Cincinnati, Ohio
- Record: 75–87 (.463)
- Divisional place: 4th
- Owners: Bob Castellini
- President of baseball operations: Dick Williams
- General managers: Nick Krall
- Managers: David Bell
- Television: Fox Sports Ohio (Thom Brennaman, Chris Welsh, George Grande, Jeff Brantley, Jim Day, Jeff Piecoro)
- Radio: WLW (700 AM); Reds Radio Network (Marty Brennaman, Jeff Brantley, Jim Day, Thom Brennaman, Chris Welsh, Tommy Thrall (fill - in), Doug Flynn (fill-in), Sam LeCure (fill-in), Danny Graves (fill-in),
- Stats: ESPN.com; Baseball Reference

The 2019 Cincinnati Reds season was the milestone 150th (Sequicentennial) season for the franchise in Major League Baseball, and their 17th at Great American Ball Park in Cincinnati. The Reds were eliminated from playoff contention on September 16 after a loss to the Chicago Cubs.

== Offseason ==
=== Coaching staff ===
- October 21, 2018: Cincinnati native and former third baseman David Bell was hired as the 63rd manager in franchise history. The contract spans three years with a club option for a fourth.
- November 2, 2018: Derek Johnson named pitching coach. Johnson was previously the pitching coach for the Milwaukee Brewers from 2016 to 2018.
- November 6, 2018: Turner Ward named hitting coach. Ward was previously the hitting coach for the Los Angeles Dodgers from 2016 to 2018.

=== Trades ===
- November 12, 2018: Traded reliever Tanner Rainey to the Washington Nationals for right-handed pitcher Tanner Roark.
- December 21, 2018: Traded right-handed pitcher Homer Bailey and two minor leaguers, Jeter Downs, and Josiah Gray to the Dodgers for outfielders Matt Kemp and Yasiel Puig, left-handed pitcher Alex Wood, catcher/infielder Kyle Farmer and cash considerations. The Dodgers subsequently released Bailey the same day.
- December 30, 2018: Traded left-handed reliever Robby Scott to the Arizona Diamondbacks for cash. Scott was claimed off waivers on December 10, but was then designated for assignment on December 21, following the trade with the Dodgers.
- January 21, 2019: Traded minor league second baseman Shed Long and a competitive balance draft pick in the 2019 MLB draft to the New York Yankees for starting pitcher Sonny Gray and minor league left-handed pitcher Reiver Sanmartin. Long was then traded to the Seattle Mariners. Gray signed a three-year, $30.5 million contract extension through 2022, with a $12 million club option for 2023.

=== Signings ===
- January 10, 2019: Signed backup catcher Curt Casali to a one-year, $950,000 contract, avoiding arbitration.
- January 11, 2019: Signed six players to one-year contracts, avoiding arbitration, starting pitcher Anthony DeSclafani, $2.125 million; second baseman Scooter Gennett, $9.775 million; right-handed pitcher Michael Lorenzen, $1.95 million; shortstop José Peraza, $2.775 million; outfielder Yasiel Puig, $9.7 million; starting pitcher Tanner Roark, $10 million.
- February 11, 2019: Signed free-agent reliever Zach Duke to a one-year, $2 million contract. This will be Duke's second stint with the Reds after pitching with the team during the 2013 season.
- February 13, 2019: Pitcher Alex Wood won his arbitration case over the club and will earn $9.65 million on a one-year contract in 2019.

== Standings ==
=== National League Central ===
NL Central
| Team | W | L | Pct. | GB | Home | Road |
|---|---|---|---|---|---|---|
| St. Louis Cardinals | 91 | 71 | .562 | — | 50‍–‍31 | 41‍–‍40 |
| Milwaukee Brewers | 89 | 73 | .549 | 2 | 49‍–‍32 | 40‍–‍41 |
| Chicago Cubs | 84 | 78 | .519 | 7 | 51‍–‍30 | 33‍–‍48 |
| Cincinnati Reds | 75 | 87 | .463 | 16 | 41‍–‍40 | 34‍–‍47 |
| Pittsburgh Pirates | 69 | 93 | .426 | 22 | 35‍–‍46 | 34‍–‍47 |

=== National League Wildcard ===
Division leaders
| Team | W | L | Pct. |
|---|---|---|---|
| Los Angeles Dodgers | 106 | 56 | .654 |
| Atlanta Braves | 97 | 65 | .599 |
| St. Louis Cardinals | 91 | 71 | .562 |

Wild Card teams (Top 2 teams qualify for postseason)
| Team | W | L | Pct. | GB |
|---|---|---|---|---|
| Washington Nationals | 93 | 69 | .574 | +4 |
| Milwaukee Brewers | 89 | 73 | .549 | — |
| New York Mets | 86 | 76 | .531 | 3 |
| Arizona Diamondbacks | 85 | 77 | .525 | 4 |
| Chicago Cubs | 84 | 78 | .519 | 5 |
| Philadelphia Phillies | 81 | 81 | .500 | 8 |
| San Francisco Giants | 77 | 85 | .475 | 12 |
| Cincinnati Reds | 75 | 87 | .463 | 14 |
| Colorado Rockies | 71 | 91 | .438 | 18 |
| San Diego Padres | 70 | 92 | .432 | 19 |
| Pittsburgh Pirates | 69 | 93 | .426 | 20 |
| Miami Marlins | 57 | 105 | .352 | 32 |

=== Record vs. opponents ===
2019 National League record Source: MLB Standings Grid – 2019
| Team | AZ | ATL | CHC | CIN | COL | LAD | MIA | MIL | NYM | PHI | PIT | SD | SF | STL | WSH | AL |
|---|---|---|---|---|---|---|---|---|---|---|---|---|---|---|---|---|
| Arizona | — | 4–3 | 2–4 | 3–3 | 9–10 | 8–11 | 3–4 | 2–5 | 2–5 | 4–2 | 6–1 | 11–8 | 10–9 | 3–3 | 4–3 | 14–6 |
| Atlanta | 3–4 | — | 5–2 | 3–4 | 3–3 | 2–4 | 15–4 | 3–3 | 11–8 | 9–10 | 5–2 | 5–2 | 5–2 | 4–2 | 11–8 | 13–7 |
| Chicago | 4–2 | 2–5 | — | 8–11 | 3–3 | 3–4 | 6–1 | 9–10 | 5–2 | 2–5 | 11–8 | 4–3 | 4–2 | 9–10 | 2–4 | 12–8 |
| Cincinnati | 3–3 | 4–3 | 11–8 | — | 3–3 | 1–5 | 6–1 | 8–11 | 3–4 | 3–4 | 7–12 | 5–2 | 4–3 | 7–12 | 1–5 | 9–11 |
| Colorado | 10–9 | 3–3 | 3–3 | 3–3 | — | 4–15 | 5–2 | 5–2 | 2–4 | 3–4 | 2–5 | 11–8 | 7–12 | 2–5 | 3–4 | 8–12 |
| Los Angeles | 11–8 | 4–2 | 4–3 | 5–1 | 15–4 | — | 5–1 | 4–3 | 5–2 | 5–2 | 6–0 | 13–6 | 12–7 | 3–4 | 4–3 | 10–10 |
| Miami | 4–3 | 4–15 | 1–6 | 1–6 | 2–5 | 1–5 | — | 2–5 | 6–13 | 10–9 | 3–3 | 4–2 | 3–3 | 3–4 | 4–15 | 9–11 |
| Milwaukee | 5–2 | 3–3 | 10–9 | 11–8 | 2–5 | 3–4 | 5–2 | — | 5–1 | 4–3 | 15–4 | 3–4 | 2–4 | 9–10 | 4–2 | 8–12 |
| New York | 5–2 | 8–11 | 2–5 | 4–3 | 4–2 | 2–5 | 13–6 | 1–5 | — | 7–12 | 5–1 | 3–3 | 3–4 | 2–5 | 12–7 | 15–5 |
| Philadelphia | 2–4 | 10–9 | 5–2 | 4–3 | 4–3 | 2–5 | 9–10 | 3–4 | 12–7 | — | 4–2 | 3–3 | 3–4 | 4–2 | 5–14 | 11–9 |
| Pittsburgh | 1–6 | 2–5 | 8–11 | 12–7 | 5–2 | 0–6 | 3–3 | 4–15 | 1–5 | 2–4 | — | 6–1 | 5–2 | 5–14 | 3–4 | 12–8 |
| San Diego | 8–11 | 2–5 | 3–4 | 2–5 | 8–11 | 6–13 | 2–4 | 4–3 | 3–3 | 3–3 | 1–6 | — | 9–10 | 4–2 | 4–3 | 11–9 |
| San Francisco | 9–10 | 2–5 | 2–4 | 3–4 | 12–7 | 7–12 | 3–3 | 4–2 | 4–3 | 4–3 | 2–5 | 10–9 | — | 3–4 | 1–5 | 11–9 |
| St. Louis | 3–3 | 2–4 | 10–9 | 12–7 | 5–2 | 4–3 | 4–3 | 10–9 | 5–2 | 2–4 | 14–5 | 2–4 | 4–3 | — | 5–2 | 9–11 |
| Washington | 3–4 | 8–11 | 4–2 | 5–1 | 4–3 | 3–4 | 15–4 | 2–4 | 7–12 | 14–5 | 4–3 | 3–4 | 5–1 | 2–5 | — | 14–6 |

== Regular Season Summary ==
=== Opening Day starting lineup ===
| Position | Name |
|---|---|
| LF | Jesse Winker |
| 1B | Joey Votto |
| RF | Yasiel Puig |
| 3B | Eugenio Suárez |
| CF | Scott Schebler |
| SS | José Peraza |
| C | Tucker Barnhart |
| 2B | José Iglesias |
| P | Luis Castillo |

=== March ===
- March 28: The Reds rallied from 2–1 deficit to defeat the Pirates on Opening Day in front of a crowd of 44,049, the largest for a regular-season game in Great American Ballpark history.

=== April ===
- April 13: The Reds played for the first time in 16 years (excluding Canada) outside the United States as they played in Monterrey, Mexico against the Cardinals. The Reds won 5–2.
- April 17: In the 8th inning, Joey Votto popped up to Dodgers first baseman Cody Bellinger in foul territory, Votto's first career pop out to first in 6,827 career plate appearances.
- April 18: Joey Votto hits his first career leadoff home run and number 271 as a member of the Cincinnati Reds, moving him into fourth place on the Reds franchise all-time home run list.

=== May ===
- May 2: Luis Castillo was named N.L. Pitcher of the Month for the month of April. In 43.1 innings, Castillo had an ERA of 1.43 and struck out 42 batters while going 3–1.
- May 3: Derek Dietrich became the first major league second baseman to hit a pair of three-run homers in the first three innings of a game since Reds Hall of Famer Joe Morgan on Aug. 19, 1974, according to STATS.
- May 5: Eugenio Suárez, Jesse Winker and Derek Dietrich hit back-to-back-to-back home runs off Giants pitcher Jeff Samardzija on three-consecutive pitches in the first inning. According to the Elias Sports Bureau, the last time a team homered on three consecutive pitches was the Dodgers on June 12, 2007, against the Mets.
- May 28: Derek Dietrich hit three home runs and had 6 RBIs in a win over the Pittsburgh Pirates. The three home runs gave Dietrich 7 home runs versus the Pirates this season and also marked his last six hits all being home runs.

=== June ===
- June 21: Derek Dietrich became the first player in the modern era (since 1900) to be hit three times by a pitch in one game according to the Elias Sports Bureau.
- June 30: Luis Castillo was named to the 2019 Major League Baseball All-Star team, the first Reds starting pitcher since 2014 to make the All-Star team. This is Castillo's first All-Star selection.

=== July ===
- July 7: Sonny Gray was named as a replacement to the MLB All-Star team, replacing Washington Nationals starting pitcher Max Scherzer. This is Gray's second All-Star selection.
- July 9: Luis Castillo pitched a scoreless fourth inning with two strikeouts for the National League, who lost to the American League 4–3 in the All-Star Game.
- July 13: Against the Colorado Rockies, the Reds, according to Elias Sports, became the first Major League team in the modern era to ever collect five triples and at least three home runs in one game.
- July 30: Reds trade Yasiel Puig to the Cleveland Indians as part of a three-team trade with the San Diego Padres and in exchange receive Indians starting pitcher Trevor Bauer. As part of the deal, the Reds send top prospect Taylor Trammell to the Padres.
- July 31: Reds traded starting pitcher Tanner Roark and sent cash to the Oakland Athletics for minor league outfielder Jameson Hannah. The Reds also traded second baseman Scooter Gennett to the San Francisco Giants for a player to be named later.

=== August ===
- August 10: Rookie Aristides Aquino hit three home runs against the Chicago Cubs to match Trevor Story's record for most home run's in a players first 10 games with seven.
- August 12: Aristides Aquino hit his 8th home run becoming the first player to ever hit eight home runs in his first 12 career games.
- August 17: Aristides Aquino hit is 11th home run becoming the first player since 1900 to have 11 home runs in his first 17 games, according to the Elias Sport Bureau.
- August 18: Kevin Gausman threw an immaculate inning, striking out all three batters on nine pitches, the 6th such feat in Reds history. This was the second time Gausman had thrown an immaculate inning, with the first coming on April 23, 2018.
- August 28: Aristides Aquino hit his 13th home run of his career becoming the first player in the modern era to hit 13 home runs in his first 100 career plate appearances.
- August 29: Aristides Aquino hit his 14th home run in August, breaking the National League rookie record for home runs in a month set by Cody Bellinger in June 2017.

=== September ===
- September 2: Aristides Aquino hit his 15th career home run, becoming the fastest player to hit that mark in MLB history. Aqunio needed just 122 plate appearances, 13 fewer than the record set by Rhys Hoskins in 2017.
- September 3: Aristides Aquino is named the National League Player of the Month & National League Rookie of the Month for the month of August. In August, Aqunio hit .320/.391/.767 with 14 home runs, and 33 runs scored. The 14 homers tied Hall of Famer Frank Robinson (August 1962) and Greg Vaughn (September 1999) for Cincinnati's franchise record by any player—rookie or veteran—in a calendar month. Aquino's 14 round-trippers also set an NL record for rookies in any calendar month.
- September 4: Michael Lorenzen became the second player in baseball history to hit a homer, earn the win as the pitcher and play in the field in the same game when the Reds defeated the Phillies, 8–5. The other player to achieve the feat was Babe Ruth on June 13, 1921.
- September 4: The four home runs hit in the Reds 8–5 victory over the Phillies were by players who weren't in the starting lineup: Logan Morrison and Jay Bruce for the Phillies and Michael Lorenzen and José Iglesias for the Reds. It was the first time since 1900 in which four players who weren't in the starting lineup for either team entered the game and hit a home run, according to the Elias Sports Bureau.
- September 18: Eugenio Suárez hit his 48th home run of the season, the most ever by a Venezuelan player, breaking the previous mark of 47 set by Andrés Galarraga in 1996.
- September 25: Eugenio Suárez hit his 49th home run of the season, which moved him ahead of Mike Schmidt and Adrián Beltré for the modern NL record by a third baseman.
- September 26: Marty Brennaman broadcasts his final game as the voice of the Reds on radio network 700 WLW. Brennaman has been the voice of the Reds for the past 46 seasons and is just one of eight major league broadcasters to cover one team for 46 seasons.
- September 30: Eugenio Suárez is named the National League Player of the Month for the month of September. Suárez recorded a .337/.455/.747 slash line with 10 homers and 18 RBIs over 25 games in September. He is the second straight Reds player to win Player of the Month honors after Aristides Aquino was Player of the Month in August.

== Game log ==
2019 Game Log: 75–87 (Home: 41–40; Away: 34–47)
March/April: 12–17 (Home: 7–6; Away: 5–11)

| # | Date | Opponent | Score | Win | Loss | Save | Attendance | Record | Box/ Streak |
|---|---|---|---|---|---|---|---|---|---|
| 1 | March 28 | Pirates | 5–3 | **Duke** (1–0) | Taillon (0–1) | **Hernandez** (1) | 44,049 | 1–0 | W1 |
| — | March 30 | Pirates | **Postponed (rain)** (Makeup date: May 27) | | | | | | |
| 2 | March 31 | Pirates | 0–5 | Williams (1–0) | **Gray** (0–1) | — | 18,737 | 1–1 | L1 |
| 3 | April 1 | Brewers | 3–4 | Wilson (1–0) | **Iglesias** (0–1) | Hader (3) | 7,799 | 1–2 | L2 |
| 4 | April 2 | Brewers | 3–4 | Chacín (2–0) | **Duke** (1–1) | Hader (4) | 10,195 | 1–3 | L3 |
| 5 | April 3 | Brewers | 0–1 | Peralta (1–0) | **Castillo** (0–1) | Wilson (1) | 13,349 | 1–4 | L4 |
| 6 | April 4 | @ Pirates | 0–2 | Kingham (1–0) | **Hernandez** (0–1) | Vázquez (1) | 8,523 | 1–5 | L5 |
| 7 | April 5 | @ Pirates | 0–2 | Musgrove (1–0) | **Gray** (0–2) | Vázquez (2) | 12,497 | 1–6 | L6 |
| 8 | April 6 | @ Pirates | 5–6 (10) | Liriano (1–0) | **Iglesias** (0–2) | — | 15,798 | 1–7 | L7 |
| 9 | April 7 | @ Pirates | 5–7 | Archer (1–0) | **DeSclafani** (0–1) | Rodríguez (1) | 14,750 | 1–8 | L8 |
| 10 | April 9 | Marlins | 14–0 | **Castillo** (1–1) | Ureña (0–3) | — | 10,058 | 2–8 | W1 |
| 11 | April 10 | Marlins | 2–1 | **Garrett** (1–0) | Steckenrider (0–2) | **Iglesias** (1) | 11,375 | 3–8 | W2 |
| 12 | April 11 | Marlins | 5–0 | **Stephenson** (1–0) | López (1–2) | — | 11,192 | 4–8 | W3 |
| 13 | April 13 | Cardinals* | 5–2 | **Hughes** (1–0) | Wainwright (1–1) | **Iglesias** (2) | 16,886 | 5–8 | W4 |
| 14 | April 14 | Cardinals* | 5–9 | Gant (3–0) | **Garrett** (1–1) | Hicks (3) | 16,793 | 5–9 | L1 |
| 15 | April 15 | @ Dodgers | 3–4 | Jansen (1–0) | **Iglesias** (0–3) | — | 52,974 | 5–10 | L2 |
| 16 | April 16 | @ Dodgers | 1–6 | Maeda (3–1) | **Mahle** (0–1) | — | 45,406 | 5–11 | L3 |
| 17 | April 17 | @ Dodgers | 2–3 | Buehler (2–0) | **Gray** (0–3) | Jansen (3) | 42,691 | 5–12 | L4 |
| 18 | April 18 | @ Padres | 4–1 | **Roark** (1–0) | Paddack (0–1) | **Iglesias** (3) | 26,577 | 6–12 | W1 |
| 19 | April 19 | @ Padres | 3–2 (11) | **Hughes** (2–0) | Stammen (2–1) | **Lorenzen** (1) | 33,442 | 7–12 | W2 |
| 20 | April 20 | @ Padres | 4–2 | **Castillo** (2–1) | Lauer (2–3) | **Iglesias** (4) | 37,137 | 8–12 | W3 |
| 21 | April 21 | @ Padres | 3–4 | Lucchesi (3–2) | **Mahle** (0–2) | Yates (10) | 25,932 | 8–13 | L1 |
| 22 | April 23 | Braves | 7–6 | **Stephenson** (2–0) | Gausman (1–2) | **Iglesias** (5) | 12,789 | 9–13 | W1 |
| 23 | April 24 | Braves | 3–1 | Soroka (1–1) | **Roark** (1–1) | Minter (3) | 12,949 | 9–14 | L1 |
| 24 | April 25 | Braves | 4–2 | **Castillo** (3–1) | Teherán (2–3) | **Iglesias** (6) | 14,792 | 10–14 | W1 |
| 25 | April 26 | @ Cardinals | 12–1 | **DeSclafani** (1–1) | Mikolas (2–2) | — | 45,087 | 11–14 | W2 |
| 26 | April 27 | @ Cardinals | 3–6 | Hudson (2–1) | **Mahle** (0–3) | Hicks (8) | 44,197 | 11–15 | L1 |
| 27 | April 28 | @ Cardinals | 2–5 | Flaherty (3–1) | **Gray** (0–4) | Gant (2) | 45,701 | 11–16 | L2 |
| 28 | April 29 | @ Mets | 5–4 | **Iglesias** (1–3) | Díaz (0–1) | — | 20,766 | 12–16 | W1 |
| 29 | April 30 | @ Mets | 3–4 (10) | Gagnon (1–0) | **Iglesias** (1–4) | — | 20,836 | 12–17 | L1 |
*April 13 and 14 games played in Monterrey, Mexico

May: 15–13 (Home: 8–7; Away: 7–6)

| # | Date | Opponent | Score | Win | Loss | Save | Attendance | Record | Box/Streak |
|---|---|---|---|---|---|---|---|---|---|
| 30 | May 1 | @ Mets | 1–0 | **Duke** (2–1) | Díaz (0–2) | **Lorenzen** (2) | 22,119 | 13–17 | W1 |
| 31 | May 2 | @ Mets | 0–1 | Syndergaard (2–3) | **Mahle** (0–4) | — | 21,445 | 13–18 | L1 |
| 32 | May 3 | Giants | 11–12 (11) | Moronta (1–2) | **Hughes** (2–1) | Smith (8) | 23,478 | 13–19 | L2 |
| 33 | May 4 | Giants | 9–2 | **Roark** (2–1) | Rodríguez (3–4) | — | 24,104 | 14–19 | W1 |
| 34 | May 5 | Giants | 5–6 | Watson (1–0) | **Iglesias** (1–5) | Smith (9) | 23,654 | 14–20 | L1 |
| 35 | May 6 | Giants | 12–4 | **DeSclafani** (2–1) | Pomeranz (1–4) | — | 19,476 | 15–20 | W1 |
| 36 | May 7 | @ Athletics | 0–2 | Fiers (3–3) | **Mahle** (0–4) | — | 11,794 | 15–21 | L1 |
| 37 | May 8 | @ Athletics | 4–5 (13) | Hendriks (1–0) | **Stephenson** (2–1) | — | 9,096 | 15–22 | L2 |
| 38 | May 9 | @ Athletics | 3–0 | **Roark** (3–1) | Bassitt (1–1) | **Iglesias** (7) | 19,694 | 16–22 | W1 |
| 39 | May 10 | @ Giants | 7–0 | **Castillo** (4–1) | Rodríguez (3–5) | — | 32,191 | 17–22 | W2 |
| 40 | May 11 | @ Giants | 5–4 | **Garrett** (2–1) | Moronta (1–3) | **Iglesias** (8) | 32,829 | 18–22 | W3 |
| 41 | May 12 | @ Giants | 5–6 | Watson (2–0) | **Hernandez** (0–2) | Smith (10) | 35,824 | 18–23 | L1 |
| 42 | May 14 | Cubs | 1–3 | Hendricks (3–4) | **Roark** (3–2) | Cishek (3) | 16,853 | 18–24 | L2 |
| 43 | May 15 | Cubs | 6–5 (10) | **Garrett** (3–1) | Brach (3–1) | — | 17,101 | 19–24 | W1 |
| 44 | May 16 | Cubs | 4–2 | **Castillo** (5–1) | Quintana (4–3) | **Iglesias** (9) | 18,739 | 20–24 | W2 |
| 45 | May 17 | Dodgers | 0–6 | Hill (1–1) | **DeSclafani** (2–2) | — | 27,456 | 20–25 | L1 |
| 46 | May 18 | Dodgers | 4–0 | **Mahle** (1–5) | Buehler (4–1) | — | 31,156 | 21–25 | W1 |
| 47 | May 19 | Dodgers | 3–8 | Ryu (6–1) | **Roark** (3–3) | — | 31,016 | 21–26 | L1 |
| 48 | May 21 | @ Brewers | 3–0 | **Gray** (1–4) | González (2–1) | **Iglesias** (10) | 36,829 | 22–26 | W1 |
| 49 | May 22 | @ Brewers | 9–11 | Guerra (2–0) | **Peralta** (0–1) | Hader (12) | 35,330 | 22–27 | L1 |
| 50 | May 24 | @ Cubs | 6-5 | **Hernandez** (1-2) | Cishek (1-2) | **Iglesias** (11) | 35,266 | 23-27 | W1 |
| 51 | May 25 | @ Cubs | 6-8 | Maples (1-0) | **Hughes** (2-2) | Chatwood (1) | 40,929 | 23-28 | L1 |
| 52 | May 26 | @ Cubs | 10–2 | **Roark** (4–3) | Quintana (4–4) | — | 40,884 | 24–28 | W1 |
| 53 | May 27 | Pirates | 5–8 | Crick (2–1) | **Hernandez** (1–3) | Vázquez (14) | 20,569 | 24–29 | L1 |
| 54 | May 27 | Pirates | 8–1 | **Gray** (2–4) | Keller (0–1) | — | 27,489 | 25–29 | W1 |
| 55 | May 28 | Pirates | 11–6 | **Sims** (1–0) | Lyles (5–2) | — | 13,824 | 26–29 | W2 |
| 56 | May 29 | Pirates | 2–7 | Brault (2–1) | **DeSclafani** (2–3) | — | 15,252 | 26–30 | L1 |
| 57 | May 31 | Nationals | 9–3 | **Mahle** (2–5) | Corbin (5–3) | — | 24,358 | 27–30 | W1 |

June: 11–13 (Home: 6–5; Away: 5–8)

| # | Date | Opponent | Score | Win | Loss | Save | Attendance | Record | Box/Streak |
|---|---|---|---|---|---|---|---|---|---|
| 58 | June 1 | Nationals | 2–5 | Rainey (1–1) | **Roark** (4–4) | Doolittle (11) | 27,748 | 27–31 | L1 |
| 59 | June 2 | Nationals | 1–4 | Scherzer (3–5) | **Gray** (2–5) | Doolittle (12) | 22,801 | 27–32 | L2 |
| 60 | June 4 | @ Cardinals | 4–1 | **Castillo** (6–1) | Cabrera (0–1) | **Iglesias** (12) | 40,649 | 28–32 | W1 |
| — | June 5 | @ Cardinals | **Postponed (rain)** (Makeup date: August 31) | | | | | | |
| 61 | June 6 | @ Cardinals | 1–3 | Gant (5–0) | **Lorenzen** (0–1) | Hicks (12) | 44,654 | 28–33 | L1 |
| 62 | June 7 | @ Phillies | 2–4 | Eflin (6–5) | **Mahle** (2–6) | Neris (13) | 32,058 | 28–34 | L2 |
| 63 | June 8 | @ Phillies | 1–4 | Pivetta (4–1) | **Roark** (4–5) | — | 44,357 | 28–35 | L3 |
| 64 | June 9 | @ Phillies | 4–3 | **Duke** (3–1) | Álvarez (0–2) | **Iglesias** (13) | 42,324 | 29–35 | W1 |
| 65 | June 11 | @ Indians | 1–2 (10) | Hand (3–2) | **Iglesias** (1–6) | — | 24,101 | 29–36 | L1 |
| 66 | June 12 | @ Indians | 7–2 | **DeSclafani** (3–3) | Plesac (1–2) | — | 24,045 | 30–36 | W1 |
| 67 | June 14 | Rangers | 1–7 | Martin (1–0) | **Mahle** (2–7) | Smyly (1) | 30,090 | 30–37 | L1 |
| 68 | June 15 | Rangers | 3–4 | Minor (6–4) | **Roark** (4–6) | Kelley (8) | 25,693 | 30–38 | L2 |
| 69 | June 16 | Rangers | 11–3 | **Gray** (3–5) | Jurado (4–3) | — | 24,079 | 31–38 | W1 |
| 70 | June 17 | Astros | 3–2 | **Castillo** (7–1) | Miley (6–4) | **Lorenzen** (3) | 22,745 | 32–38 | W2 |
| 71 | June 18 | Astros | 4–3 | **DeSclafani** (4–3) | Verlander (9–3) | **Lorenzen** (4) | 25,347 | 33–38 | W3 |
| 72 | June 19 | Astros | 3–2 | **Bowman** (1–0) | Osuna (3–1) | — | 24,777 | 34–38 | W4 |
| 73 | June 20 | @ Brewers | 7–1 | **Roark** (5–6) | Nelson (0–2) | — | 28,898 | 35–38 | W5 |
| 74 | June 21 | @ Brewers | 11–7 | **Hernandez** (2–3) | Anderson (3–2) | — | 38,289 | 36–38 | W6 |
| 75 | June 22 | @ Brewers | 5–6 | Albers (4–2) | **Castillo** (7–2) | Hader (18) | 43,971 | 36–39 | L1 |
| 76 | June 23 | @ Brewers | 5–7 | Woodruff (9–2) | **DeSclafani** (4–4) | — | 41,237 | 36–40 | L2 |
| 77 | June 25 | @ Angels | 1–5 | Heaney (1–1) | **Mahle** (2–8) | — | 37,260 | 36–41 | L3 |
| 78 | June 26 | @ Angels | 1–5 | Bedrosian (3–3) | **Iglesias** (1–7) | — | 35,272 | 36–42 | L4 |
| 79 | June 28 | Cubs | 6–3 | **Gray** (4–5) | Hamels (6–3) | **Lorenzen** (5) | 36,919 | 37–42 | W1 |
| 80 | June 29 | Cubs | 0–6 | Quintana (5–7) | **Castillo** (7–3) | — | 41,360 | 37–43 | L1 |
| 81 | June 30 | Cubs | 8–6 | **DeSclafani** (5–4) | Lester (7–6) | **Iglesias** (14) | 31,165 | 38–43 | W1 |

July: 12–13 (Home: 8–8; Away: 4–5)

| # | Date | Opponent | Score | Win | Loss | Save | Attendance | Record | Box/Streak |
|---|---|---|---|---|---|---|---|---|---|
| 82 | July 1 | Brewers | 6–8 | Claudio (2–2) | **Hernandez** (2–4) | Jeffress (1) | 16,186 | 38–44 | L1 |
| 83 | July 2 | Brewers | 5–4 (11) | **Iglesias** (2–7) | Burnes (1–4) | — | 15,105 | 39–44 | W1 |
| 84 | July 3 | Brewers | 3–0 | **Gray** (5–5) | Chacín (3–9) | **Iglesias** (15) | 22,685 | 40–44 | W2 |
| 85 | July 4 | Brewers | 1–0 | **Castillo** (8–3) | Woodruff (10–3) | **Iglesias** (16) | 20,885 | 41–44 | W3 |
| 86 | July 6 | Indians | 2–7 | Bieber (8–3) | **Lorenzen** (0–2) | — | 36,504 | 41–45 | L1 |
| 87 | July 7 | Indians | 1–11 | Bauer (8–6) | **Mahle** (2–9) | — | 27,041 | 41–46 | L2 |
| 88 | July 12 | @ Rockies | 2–3 | Díaz (2–2) | **Hernandez** (2–5) | Davis (13) | 41,368 | 41–47 | L3 |
| 89 | July 13 | @ Rockies | 17–9 | **Hughes** (3–2) | Bettis (1–5) | — | 43,650 | 42–47 | W1 |
| 90 | July 14 | @ Rockies | 9–10 | Senzatela (8–6) | **Mahle** (2–10) | Davis (14) | 40,624 | 42–48 | L1 |
| 91 | July 15 | @ Cubs | 6–3 | **Castillo** (9–3) | Cishek (2–5) | **Iglesias** (17) | 36,935 | 43–48 | W1 |
| 92 | July 16 | @ Cubs | 3–4 (10) | Cishek (3–5) | **Iglesias** (2–8) | — | 39,788 | 43–49 | L1 |
| 93 | July 17 | @ Cubs | 2–5 | Darvish (3–4) | **Gray** (5–6) | Kimbrel (4) | 37,260 | 43–50 | L2 |
| 94 | July 18 | Cardinals | 4–7 | Hudson (9–4) | **Stephenson** (2–2) | Miller (2) | 32,359 | 43–51 | L3 |
| 95 | July 19 | Cardinals | 11–12 | Wacha (6–4) | **Hughes** (3–3) | Martínez (7) | 37,652 | 43–52 | L4 |
| 96 | July 20 | Cardinals | 3–2 | **Garrett** (4–1) | Mikolas (6–10) | **Lorenzen** (6) | 38,427 | 44–52 | W1 |
| 97 | July 21 | Cardinals | 1–3 | Gallegos (2–1) | **DeSclafani** (5–5) | Martínez (8) | 28,763 | 44–53 | L1 |
| 98 | July 22 | @ Brewers | 6–5 | **Peralta** (1–1) | Jeffress (3–3) | **Hughes** (1) | 26,235 | 45–53 | W1 |
| 99 | July 23 | @ Brewers | 14–6 | **Roark** (6–6) | Davies (8–3) | **Romano** (1) | 33,512 | 46–53 | W2 |
| 100 | July 24 | @ Brewers | 4–5 | Albers (5–3) | **Sims** (1–1) | Peralta (1) | 39,682 | 46–54 | L1 |
| 101 | July 26 | Rockies | 2–12 | Márquez (10–5) | **Castillo** (9–4) | — | 23,045 | 46–55 | L2 |
| 102 | July 27 | Rockies | 3–1 | **DeSclafani** (6–5) | Gonzalez (0–3) | **Iglesias** (18) | 25,115 | 47–55 | W1 |
| 103 | July 28 | Rockies | 3–2 | **Sims** (2–1) | McGee (0–2) | **Iglesias** (19) | 19,649 | 48–55 | W2 |
| 104 | July 29 | Pirates | 11–6 | **Gray** (6–6) | McRae (0–3) | — | 15,944 | 49–55 | W3 |
| 105 | July 30 | Pirates | 4–11 | Musgrove (8–9) | **Roark** (6–7) | — | 18,786 | 49–56 | L1 |
| 106 | July 31 | Pirates | 4–1 | **Castillo** (10–4) | Agrazal (2–2) | **Iglesias** (20) | 20,886 | 50–56 | W1 |

August: 13–16 (Home: 8–5; Away: 5–11)

| # | Date | Opponent | Score | Win | Loss | Save | Attendance | Record | Box/Streak |
|---|---|---|---|---|---|---|---|---|---|
| 107 | August 1 | @ Braves | 1–4 (7) | Fried (12–4) | **DeSclafani** (6–6) | — | 28,677 | 50–57 | L1 |
| 108 | August 2 | @ Braves | 5–2 | **Wood** (1–0) | Gausman (3–7) | **Iglesias** (21) | 37,743 | 51–57 | W1 |
| 109 | August 3 | @ Braves | 4–5 (10) | Jackson (6–2) | **Hughes** (3–4) | — | 42,085 | 51–58 | L1 |
| 110 | August 4 | @ Braves | 6–4 (10) | **Stephenson** (3–2) | Greene (0–3) | **Hernandez** (2) | 33,083 | 52–58 | W1 |
| 111 | August 5 | Angels | 7–4 | **Castillo** (11–4) | Cole (1–3) | **Iglesias** (22) | 21,895 | 53–58 | W2 |
| 112 | August 6 | Angels | 8–4 | **DeSclafani** (7–6) | Suárez (2–3) | — | 19,288 | 54–58 | W3 |
| 113 | August 8 | Cubs | 5–12 | Chatwood (5–1) | **Gausman** (3–8) | — | 20,111 | 54–59 | L1 |
| 114 | August 9 | Cubs | 5–2 | **Bauer** (10–8) | Darvish (4–6) | **Iglesias** (23) | 31,569 | 55–59 | W1 |
| 115 | August 10 | Cubs | 10–1 | **Gray** (7–6) | Hendricks (8–9) | **Romano** (2) | 39,866 | 56–59 | W2 |
| 116 | August 11 | Cubs | 3–6 | Phelps (1–0) | **Lorenzen** (0–3) | Strop (10) | 31,929 | 56–60 | L1 |
| 117 | August 12 | @ Nationals | 6–7 | Fedde (3–2) | **DeSclafani** (7–7) | Doolittle (27) | 22,394 | 56–61 | L2 |
| 118 | August 13 | @ Nationals | 1–3 | Ross (3–3) | **Wood** (1–1) | Hudson (3) | 30,130 | 56–62 | L3 |
| 119 | August 14 | @ Nationals | 7–17 | Strasburg (15–5) | **Bauer** (10–9) | Guerra (2) | 23,596 | 56–63 | L4 |
| 120 | August 15 | Cardinals | 2–1 | **Gray** (8–6) | Wacha (6–6) | **Iglesias** (24) | 14,891 | 57–63 | W1 |
| 121 | August 16 | Cardinals | 4–13 | Wainwright (9–8) | **Castillo** (11–5) | — | 24,118 | 57–64 | L1 |
| 122 | August 17 | Cardinals | 6–1 | **DeSclafani** (8–7) | Mikolas (7–13) | — | 37,698 | 58–64 | W1 |
| 123 | August 18 | Cardinals | 4–5 | Flaherty (7–6) | **Wood** (1–2) | Martínez (14) | 21,525 | 58–65 | L1 |
| 124 | August 19 | Padres | 2–3 | Perdomo (2–3) | **Bauer** (10–10) | Yates (36) | 10,176 | 58–66 | L2 |
| 125 | August 20 | Padres | 3–2 | **Gray** (9–6) | Quantrill (6–4) | **Iglesias** (25) | 12,468 | 59–66 | W1 |
| 126 | August 21 | Padres | 4–2 | **Castillo** (12–5) | Yardley (0–1) | **Iglesias** (26) | 13,397 | 60–66 | W2 |
| 127 | August 23 | @ Pirates | 2–3 | Vázquez (4–1) | **Iglesias** (2–9) | — | 20,091 | 60–67 | L1 |
| 128 | August 24 | @ Pirates | 0–14 | Williams (6–6) | **Wood** (1–3) | — | 26,776 | 60–68 | L2 |
| 129 | August 25 | @ Pirates | 8–9 | Agrazal (3–3) | **Bauer** (10–11) | Vázquez (23) | 22,349 | 60–69 | L3 |
| 130 | August 26 | @ Marlins | 6–3 | **Gray** (10–6) | López (5–6) | — | 5,297 | 61–69 | W1 |
| 131 | August 27 | @ Marlins | 8–5 | **Castillo** (13–5) | Smith (8–8) | **Iglesias** (27) | 6,169 | 62–69 | W2 |
| 132 | August 28 | @ Marlins | 5–0 | **DeSclafani** (9–7) | Alcántara (4–12) | — | 6,409 | 63–69 | W3 |
| 133 | August 29 | @ Marlins | 3–4 (12) | Kinley (3–1) | **Iglesias** (2–10) | — | 6,466 | 63–70 | L1 |
| — | August 30 | @ Cardinals | **Postponed (rain)** (Makeup date: September 1) | | | | | | |
| 134 | August 31 (1) | @ Cardinals | 6–10 | Hudson (14–6) | **Bauer** (10–12) | — | 44,738 | 63–71 | L2 |
| 135 | August 31 (2) | @ Cardinals | 2–3 | Gant (10–0) | **Iglesias** (2–11) | — | 42,074 | 63–72 | L3 |

September: 12–15 (Home: 4–9; Away: 8–6)

| # | Date | Opponent | Score | Win | Loss | Save | Attendance | Record | Box/Streak |
|---|---|---|---|---|---|---|---|---|---|
| 136 | September 1 (1) | @ Cardinals | 3–4 | Martínez (4–2) | **Lorenzen** (0–4) | — | 43,692 | 63–73 | L4 |
| 137 | September 1 (2) | @ Cardinals | 5–3 | **Castillo** (14–5) | Ponce de Leon (1–2) | **Iglesias** (28) | 38,665 | 64–73 | W1 |
| 138 | September 2 | Phillies | 1–7 | Smyly (3–6) | **DeSclafani** (9–8) | — | 19,631 | 64–74 | L1 |
| 139 | September 3 | Phillies | 2–6 | Vincent (1–2) | **Garrett** (4–2) | — | 11,452 | 64–75 | L2 |
| 140 | September 4 | Phillies | 8–5 | **Lorenzen** (1–4) | Álvarez (3–4) | **Iglesias** (29) | 13,448 | 65–75 | W1 |
| 141 | September 5 | Phillies | 4–3 (11) | **Bowman** (2–0) | Vincent (1–3) | — | 13,230 | 66–75 | W2 |
| 142 | September 6 | Diamondbacks | 5–7 | Ginkel (1–0) | **Mahle** (2–11) | Bradley (13) | 19,048 | 66–76 | L1 |
| 143 | September 7 | Diamondbacks | 0–2 | Young (7–3) | **Castillo** (14–6) | Sherfy (1) | 34,804 | 66–77 | L2 |
| 144 | September 8 | Diamondbacks | 4–3 | **Iglesias** (3–11) | López (2–6) | — | 19,717 | 67–77 | W1 |
| 145 | September 10 | @ Mariners | 3–4 | Altavilla (1–0) | **Garrett** (4–3) | Bass (3) | 12,230 | 67–78 | L1 |
| 146 | September 11 | @ Mariners | 3–5 | Gonzales (15–11) | **Gray** (10–7) | Bass (4) | 10,152 | 67–79 | L2 |
| 147 | September 12 | @ Mariners | 11–5 | **Romano** (1–0) | Altavilla (1–1) | — | 15,564 | 68–79 | W1 |
| 148 | September 13 | @ Diamondbacks | 4–3 | **Castillo** (15–6) | Leake (11–11) | **Iglesias** (30) | 35,158 | 69–79 | W2 |
| 149 | September 14 | @ Diamondbacks | 0–1 | Kelly (11–14) | **DeSclafani** (9–9) | Bradley (14) | 35,151 | 69–80 | L1 |
| 150 | September 15 | @ Diamondbacks | 3–1 | **Bauer** (11–12) | Gallen (3–6) | **Iglesias** (31) | 25,193 | 70–80 | W1 |
| 151 | September 16 | @ Cubs | 2–8 | Mills (1–0) | **Gausman** (3–9) | — | 33,753 | 70–81 | L1 |
| 152 | September 17 | @ Cubs | 4–2 | **Gray** (11–7) | Darvish (6–7) | **Iglesias** (32) | 34,267 | 71–81 | W1 |
| 153 | September 18 | @ Cubs | 3–2 (10) | **Garrett** (5–3) | Norwood (0–1) | **Iglesias** (33) | 36,578 | 72–81 | W2 |
| 154 | September 20 | Mets | 1–8 | deGrom (10–8) | **Castillo** (15–7) | — | 20,576 | 72–82 | L1 |
| 155 | September 21 | Mets | 3–2 | **Kuhnel** (1–0) | Wilson (4–2) | **Iglesias** (34) | 30,487 | 73–82 | W1 |
| 156 | September 22 | Mets | 3–6 | Brach (5–4) | **Bauer** (11–13) | Wilson (4) | 21,335 | 73–83 | L1 |
| 157 | September 24 | Brewers | 2–4 | Suter (4–0) | **Gray** (11–8) | Hader (36) | 14,778 | 73–84 | L2 |
| 158 | September 25 | Brewers | 2–9 | Lyles (12–8) | **Mahle** (2–12) | — | 16,530 | 73–85 | L3 |
| 159 | September 26 | Brewers | 3–5 | Anderson (8–4) | **Castillo** (15–8) | Hader (37) | 27,774 | 73–86 | L4 |
| 160 | September 27 | @ Pirates | 5–6 | Ríos (1–0) | **Iglesias** (3–12) | — | 18,544 | 73–87 | L5 |
| 161 | September 28 | @ Pirates | 4–2 (12) | **Alaniz** (1–0) | McRae (0–4) | — | 21,084 | 74–87 | W1 |
| 162 | September 29 | @ Pirates | 3–1 | **Mahle** (3–12) | Williams (7–9) | **Lorenzen** (7) | 23,617 | 75–87 | W2 |

Legend: = Win = Loss = Postponement
Bold = Reds team member

== Player stats ==
=== Batting ===
Note: G = Games played; AB = At bats; R = Runs; H = Hits; 2B = Doubles; 3B = Triples; HR = Home runs; RBI = Runs batted in; SB = Stolen bases; BB = Walks; AVG = Batting average; SLG = Slugging average

| Player | G | AB | R | H | 2B | 3B | HR | RBI | SB | BB | AVG | SLG |
|---|---|---|---|---|---|---|---|---|---|---|---|---|
| Eugenio Suárez | 159 | 575 | 87 | 156 | 22 | 2 | 49 | 103 | 3 | 70 | .271 | .572 |
| Joey Votto | 142 | 525 | 79 | 137 | 32 | 1 | 15 | 47 | 5 | 76 | .261 | .411 |
| José Iglesias | 146 | 504 | 62 | 145 | 21 | 3 | 11 | 59 | 6 | 20 | .288 | .407 |
| Jose Peraza | 141 | 376 | 37 | 90 | 18 | 2 | 6 | 33 | 7 | 17 | .239 | .346 |
| Nick Senzel | 104 | 375 | 55 | 96 | 20 | 4 | 12 | 42 | 14 | 30 | .256 | .427 |
| Yasiel Puig | 100 | 373 | 51 | 94 | 15 | 1 | 22 | 61 | 14 | 23 | .252 | .475 |
| Jesse Winker | 113 | 338 | 51 | 91 | 17 | 2 | 16 | 38 | 0 | 38 | .269 | .473 |
| Tucker Barnhart | 114 | 316 | 32 | 73 | 14 | 0 | 11 | 40 | 1 | 44 | .231 | .380 |
| Derek Dietrich | 113 | 251 | 41 | 47 | 8 | 2 | 19 | 43 | 1 | 28 | .187 | .462 |
| Phil Ervin | 94 | 236 | 30 | 64 | 11 | 7 | 7 | 23 | 4 | 18 | .271 | .466 |
| Josh VanMeter | 95 | 228 | 33 | 54 | 13 | 1 | 8 | 23 | 9 | 29 | .237 | .408 |
| Curt Casali | 84 | 207 | 24 | 52 | 9 | 0 | 8 | 32 | 0 | 25 | .251 | .411 |
| Aristides Aquino | 56 | 205 | 31 | 53 | 8 | 0 | 19 | 47 | 7 | 16 | .259 | .576 |
| Kyle Farmer | 97 | 183 | 22 | 42 | 6 | 0 | 9 | 27 | 4 | 10 | .230 | .410 |
| Freddy Galvis | 32 | 107 | 12 | 25 | 4 | 0 | 5 | 16 | 0 | 7 | .234 | .411 |
| Scott Schebler | 30 | 81 | 11 | 10 | 2 | 0 | 2 | 7 | 0 | 14 | .123 | .222 |
| Scooter Gennett | 21 | 69 | 4 | 15 | 3 | 0 | 0 | 5 | 0 | 1 | .217 | .261 |
| Matt Kemp | 20 | 60 | 4 | 12 | 2 | 0 | 1 | 5 | 0 | 1 | .200 | .283 |
| Michael Lorenzen | 100 | 48 | 6 | 10 | 2 | 0 | 1 | 6 | 5 | 5 | .208 | .313 |
| Brian O'Grady | 28 | 42 | 4 | 8 | 2 | 1 | 2 | 3 | 0 | 4 | .190 | .429 |
| Alex Blandino | 23 | 36 | 6 | 9 | 1 | 0 | 1 | 3 | 0 | 10 | .250 | .361 |
| Ryan Lavarnway | 5 | 18 | 4 | 5 | 2 | 0 | 2 | 7 | 0 | 1 | .278 | .722 |
| Juan Graterol | 6 | 18 | 1 | 4 | 0 | 0 | 0 | 1 | 0 | 0 | .222 | .222 |
| Christian Colón | 8 | 6 | 1 | 3 | 0 | 0 | 0 | 1 | 0 | 0 | .500 | .500 |
| Pitcher totals | 162 | 321 | 19 | 43 | 5 | 1 | 2 | 13 | 5 | 10 | .134 | .174 |
| Team totals | 162 | 5450 | 701 | 1328 | 235 | 27 | 227 | 679 | 80 | 492 | .244 | .422 |

=== Pitching ===
Note: W = Wins; L = Losses; ERA = Earned run average; G = Games pitched; GS = Games started; SV = Saves; IP = Innings pitched; H = Hits allowed; R = Runs allowed; ER = Earned runs allowed; BB = Walks allowed; SO = Strikeouts

| Player | W | L | ERA | G | GS | SV | IP | H | R | ER | BB | SO |
|---|---|---|---|---|---|---|---|---|---|---|---|---|
| Luis Castillo | 15 | 8 | 3.40 | 32 | 32 | 0 | 190.2 | 139 | 76 | 72 | 79 | 226 |
| Sonny Gray | 11 | 8 | 2.87 | 31 | 31 | 0 | 175.1 | 122 | 59 | 56 | 68 | 205 |
| Anthony DeSclafani | 9 | 9 | 3.89 | 31 | 31 | 0 | 166.2 | 151 | 77 | 72 | 49 | 167 |
| Tyler Mahle | 3 | 12 | 5.14 | 25 | 25 | 0 | 129.2 | 136 | 82 | 74 | 34 | 129 |
| Tanner Roark | 6 | 7 | 4.24 | 21 | 21 | 0 | 110.1 | 119 | 55 | 52 | 38 | 108 |
| Michael Lorenzen | 1 | 4 | 2.92 | 73 | 0 | 7 | 83.1 | 68 | 29 | 27 | 28 | 85 |
| Raisel Iglesias | 3 | 12 | 4.16 | 68 | 0 | 34 | 67.0 | 61 | 31 | 31 | 21 | 89 |
| Robert Stephenson | 3 | 2 | 3.76 | 57 | 0 | 0 | 64.2 | 43 | 30 | 27 | 24 | 81 |
| Trevor Bauer | 2 | 5 | 6.39 | 10 | 10 | 0 | 56.1 | 57 | 42 | 40 | 19 | 68 |
| Amir Garrett | 5 | 3 | 3.21 | 69 | 0 | 0 | 56.0 | 44 | 22 | 20 | 35 | 78 |
| Jared Hughes | 3 | 4 | 4.10 | 47 | 0 | 1 | 48.1 | 41 | 27 | 22 | 19 | 34 |
| Lucas Sims | 2 | 1 | 4.60 | 24 | 4 | 0 | 43.0 | 31 | 22 | 22 | 19 | 57 |
| David Hernandez | 2 | 5 | 8.02 | 47 | 0 | 2 | 42.2 | 53 | 39 | 38 | 20 | 53 |
| Alex Wood | 1 | 3 | 5.80 | 7 | 7 | 0 | 35.2 | 41 | 25 | 23 | 9 | 30 |
| Wandy Peralta | 1 | 1 | 6.09 | 39 | 0 | 0 | 34.0 | 36 | 23 | 23 | 15 | 27 |
| Matt Bowman | 2 | 0 | 3.66 | 27 | 0 | 0 | 32.0 | 27 | 15 | 13 | 13 | 25 |
| Zach Duke | 3 | 1 | 5.01 | 30 | 0 | 0 | 23.1 | 21 | 13 | 13 | 18 | 18 |
| Kevin Gausman | 0 | 2 | 4.03 | 15 | 1 | 0 | 22.1 | 21 | 11 | 10 | 5 | 29 |
| Sal Romano | 1 | 0 | 7.71 | 12 | 0 | 2 | 16.1 | 22 | 14 | 14 | 8 | 16 |
| R. J. Alaniz | 1 | 0 | 5.40 | 8 | 0 | 0 | 11.2 | 8 | 7 | 7 | 4 | 7 |
| Joel Kuhnel | 1 | 0 | 4.66 | 11 | 0 | 0 | 9.2 | 8 | 5 | 5 | 5 | 9 |
| Jimmy Herget | 0 | 0 | 4.26 | 5 | 0 | 0 | 6.1 | 8 | 3 | 3 | 3 | 0 |
| Cody Reed | 0 | 0 | 1.42 | 3 | 0 | 0 | 6.1 | 6 | 1 | 1 | 1 | 7 |
| Keury Mella | 0 | 0 | 7.36 | 2 | 0 | 0 | 3.2 | 5 | 3 | 3 | 2 | 4 |
| José Peraza | 0 | 0 | 0.00 | 2 | 0 | 0 | 1.1 | 1 | 0 | 0 | 0 | 0 |
| Kyle Farmer | 0 | 0 | 0.00 | 1 | 0 | 0 | 1.1 | 1 | 0 | 0 | 0 | 0 |
| Team totals | 75 | 87 | 4.18 | 162 | 162 | 46 | 1438.0 | 1270 | 711 | 668 | 536 | 1552 |

== Roster ==
2019 Cincinnati Reds
Roster
| Pitchers: 32 R. J. Alaniz; 27 Trevor Bauer; 67 Matt Bowman; 58 Luis Castillo; 28 Anthony DeSclafani; 32 Zach Duke; 50 Amir Garrett; 46 Kevin Gausman; 54 Sonny Gray; 49 Jimmy Herget; 37 David Hernandez; 48 Jared Hughes; 26 Raisel Iglesias; 66 Joel Kuhnel; 21 Michael Lorenzen; 30 Tyler Mahle; 63 Keury Mella; 53 Wandy Peralta; 23 Cody Reed; 35 Tanner Roark; 47 Sal Romano; 39 Lucas Sims; 55 Robert Stephenson; 40 Alex Wood | Catchers: 16 Tucker Barnhart; 12 Curt Casali; 68 Juan Graterol; 59 Ryan Lavarnway; Infielders: 2 Alex Blandino; 29 Christian Colón; 22 Derek Dietrich; 52 Kyle Farmer; 3 Freddy Galvis; 3 Scooter Gennett; 4 José Iglesias; 9 José Peraza; 7 Eugenio Suárez; 19 Joey Votto | Outfielders: 44 Aristides Aquino; 6 Phillip Ervin; 27 Matt Kemp; 34 Brian O'Grady; 66 Yasiel Puig; 43 Scott Schebler; 15 Nick Senzel; 17 Josh VanMeter; 33 Jesse Winker | Manager: 25 David Bell; Coaches: 45 Freddie Benavides (bench); 91 Yusuf Carter (coach); 65 Caleb Cotham (assistant pitching); 90 Delino DeShields (first base/infield); 64 Donnie Ecker (assistant hitting); 56 J. R. House (third base/catching); 92 Lee Irving (bullpen catcher); 36 Derek Johnson (pitching); 89 Cristian Perez (assistant bullpen/advance scouting); 61 Jeff Pickler (game planning/outfield); 60 Lee Tunnell (bullpen); 88 Rolando Valles (associate); 31 Turner Ward (hitting) |

== Awards and honors ==
| Recipient | Award | Date awarded | Ref. |
|---|---|---|---|
| Luis Castillo | National League Pitcher of the Month (April) | May 2, 2019 | |
| Aristides Aquino | National League Player of the Month & National League Rookie of the Month (August) | September 3, 2019 | |
| Eugenio Suárez | National League Player of the Month (September) | September 30, 2019 | |

== Farm system ==
| Level | Team | League | Manager |
|---|---|---|---|
| AAA | Louisville Bats | International League | Jody Davis |
| AA | Chattanooga Lookouts | Southern League | Pat Kelly |
| A | Daytona Tortugas | Florida State League | Ricky Gutierrez |
| A | Dayton Dragons | Midwest League | Luis Bolivar |
| A-Rookie Advanced | Billings Mustangs | Pioneer League | Ray Martinez |
| A-Rookie Advanced | Greeneville Reds | Appalachian League | Gookie Dawkins |
| Rookie | AZL Reds | Arizona League | |
| Rookie | DSL Reds | Dominican Summer League | |
