= Tyler Webb =

American baseball player (born 1990)

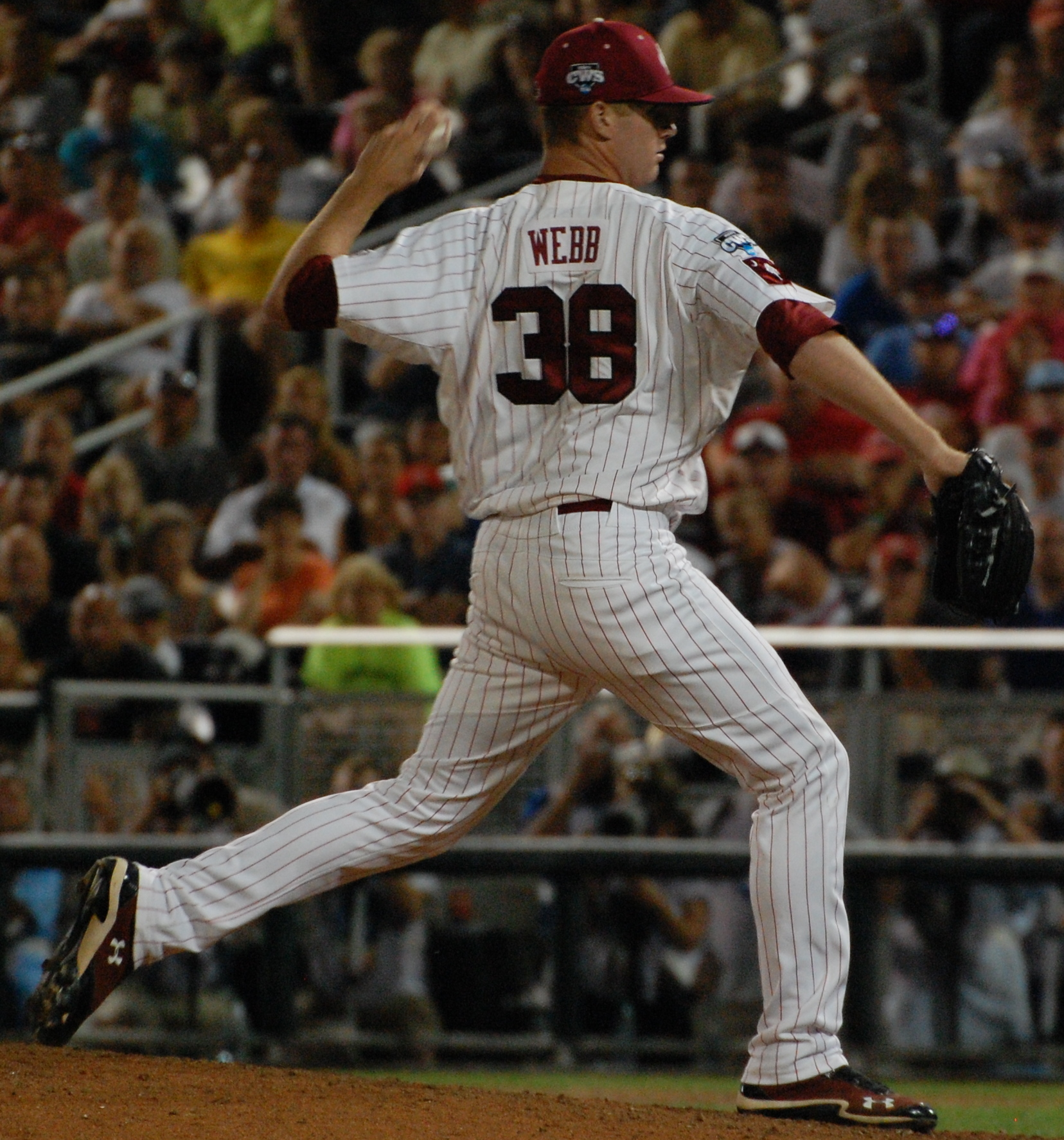
- Webb with South Carolina at the 2012 College World Series
- Pitcher
- Born: July 20, 1990 (age 36); Nassawadox, Virginia, U.S.
- Batted: Left Threw: Left

MLB debut
- June 24, 2017, for the New York Yankees

Last MLB appearance
- June 2, 2021, for the St. Louis Cardinals

MLB statistics
- Win–loss record: 3–3
- Earned run average: 4.97
- Strikeouts: 104
- Stats at Baseball Reference

Teams
- New York Yankees (2017); Milwaukee Brewers (2017); San Diego Padres (2018); St. Louis Cardinals (2018–2021)

Jon Tyler Webb (born July 20, 1990) is an American former professional baseball pitcher. He played in Major League Baseball (MLB) for the New York Yankees, Milwaukee Brewers, San Diego Padres, and St. Louis Cardinals. The Yankees selected Webb in the tenth round of the 2013 MLB draft and he made his MLB debut for them in 2017. Webb played college baseball for the University of South Carolina.

== Career ==
=== Amateur career ===
Webb attended Northampton High School in Eastville, Virginia. After graduating from high school, Webb enrolled at the University of South Carolina, where he played college baseball for the South Carolina Gamecocks baseball team. He was a member of the 2010 and 2011 College World Series championship teams. In 2012, his junior year, Webb pitched to a 6–1 win–loss record and a 1.56 earned run average (ERA), and recorded 58 strikeouts in 57 2/3 innings pitched. Before his senior year, the National Collegiate Baseball Writers Association named Webb a second-team preseason All-American. Serving as the Gamecocks' closer, Webb recorded 17 saves in the 2013 season, and was named a third-team All-American by Collegiate Baseball and a second-team All-Southeastern Conference pitcher after the season. He finished his Gamecocks' career with a 2.34 ERA and the record for games pitched (110).

=== New York Yankees ===
The New York Yankees selected Webb in the tenth round, with the 314th overall selection, of the 2013 Major League Baseball draft. The Yankees assigned him to the Staten Island Yankees of the Low–A New York–Penn League after he signed, but promoted him to the Charleston RiverDogs of the Single–A South Atlantic League two weeks later. Over 35 1/3 relief innings, he went 3–1 with a 3.31 ERA. Webb began the 2014 season with the Tampa Yankees of the High–A Florida State League, and was promoted to the Trenton Thunder of the Double–A Eastern League in May, with whom he was named an Eastern League All-Star. Webb was promoted to the Scranton/Wilkes-Barre RailRiders of the Triple–A International League following the All-Star break. For the season, Webb went 3–6 with a 3.80 ERA and 12 saves and 94 strikeouts in 48 games and 68 2/3 innings pitched.

Webb received a non-roster invitation to spring training with the Yankees in 2015, and opened the season with Scranton/Wilkes-Barre. Due to a tendon injury, he only pitched 38 innings during the season (going 2–3 with a 2.84 ERA), and the Yankees assigned Webb to the Arizona Fall League after the regular season. In 2016, he pitched for Scranton/Wilkes-Barre, going 4–3 with a 3.59 ERA over 72 2/3 innings pitched out of the bullpen.

On December 8, 2016, the Pittsburgh Pirates selected Webb from the Yankees in the Rule 5 draft. He competed for a role with the Pirates during spring training, but did not make the 25-man roster and was returned to the Yankees before the regular season. Webb began the 2017 season with Scranton/Wilkes-Barre.

The Yankees promoted Webb to the major leagues for the first time on June 22, 2017, and he made his MLB debut on June 24. He made seven relief appearances for the Yankees, pitching to a 4.50 ERA while striking out five and walking four in six innings.

=== Milwaukee Brewers ===
On July 13, 2017, the Yankees traded Webb to the Milwaukee Brewers in exchange for Garrett Cooper. Following the trade, Webb pitched for Milwaukee and the Colorado Springs Sky Sox of the Triple–A Pacific Coast League (PCL). Over two innings with Milwaukee, he gave up two runs, and over 17 games with Colorado Springs, he went 1–2 with a 6.48 ERA. Webb was designated for assignment on April 7, 2018.

=== San Diego Padres ===
On April 14, 2018, Webb was claimed off waivers by the San Diego Padres. He made one appearance for the El Paso Chihuahuas of the PCL before the Padres promoted him to the major leagues.

=== St. Louis Cardinals ===
On June 29, 2018, Webb was claimed off waivers by the St. Louis Cardinals and assigned to the Triple–A Memphis Redbirds of the PCL. He was recalled by St. Louis on July 27. In 15 1/3 innings pitched for St. Louis, he compiled a 1.76 ERA.

Webb began 2019 with Memphis. He was recalled by the Cardinals for the first time in 2019 on April 7, and optioned back to Memphis on July 11. He was recalled on July 21, finishing the season with St. Louis Over 65 relief appearances during the regular season, he went 2–1 with a 3.76 ERA, striking out 48 over 55 innings.

In 2020 for the Cardinals, Webb recorded a 2.08 ERA and a 1–1 record in 21.2 innings pitched across 21 games. After struggling to a 13.22 ERA in 22 appearances in 2021, Webb was designated for assignment by the Cardinals on June 3, 2021. He was outrighted to the Triple-A Memphis Redbirds on June 6. Webb elected free agency on October 14.

=== Long Island Ducks ===
On April 4, 2022, Webb signed with the Long Island Ducks of the Atlantic League of Professional Baseball. Webb made 53 appearances for the Ducks, working to a 2–5 record and 2.93 ERA with 68 strikeouts and 15 saves in 55 1/3 innings pitched.

=== Minnesota Twins ===
On February 8, 2023, Webb signed a minor league contract with the Minnesota Twins organization. Webb was released by the organization on March 24.

== Personal life ==
Webb's father, Kirk, pitched in college baseball for Old Dominion University.

Webb and his wife, Lauren, were married in December 2014.

Prior to Webb's first promotion to the Yankees, he had never been to a major league game.

== See also ==
- Rule 5 draft results
