= José Martínez (outfielder/first baseman) =

Venezuelan baseball player (born 1988)

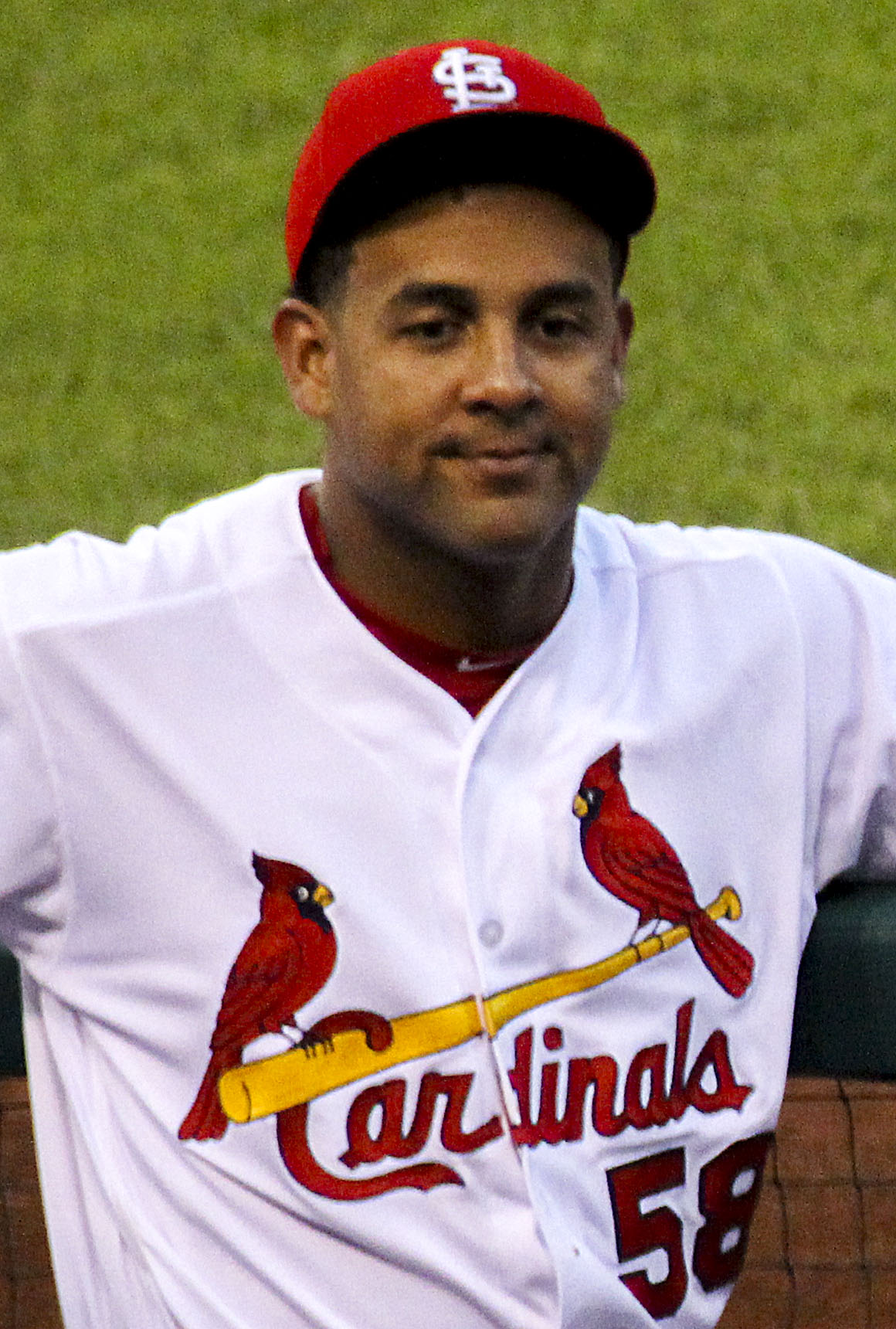
- Martínez with the St. Louis Cardinals in 2017
- First baseman / Outfielder
- Born: July 25, 1988 (age 38); La Guaira, Vargas, Venezuela
- Batted: Right Threw: Right

MLB debut
- September 6, 2016, for the St. Louis Cardinals

Last MLB appearance
- September 24, 2020, for the Chicago Cubs

MLB statistics
- Batting average: .289
- Home runs: 43
- Runs batted in: 182
- Stats at Baseball Reference

Teams
- St. Louis Cardinals (2016–2019); Tampa Bay Rays (2020); Chicago Cubs (2020)

José Alberto Martínez (born July 25, 1988) is a Venezuelan former professional baseball first baseman and outfielder. He played in Major League Baseball (MLB) for the St. Louis Cardinals, Tampa Bay Rays, and Chicago Cubs. Martínez made his major league debut with the Cardinals on September 6, 2016, after 887 games in ten minor league seasons.

As a member of the Triple-A Omaha Storm Chasers in the Kansas City Royals organization in 2015, Martínez set a modern-day Pacific Coast League (PCL) record with a .384 batting average. He also played in the Chicago White Sox and Atlanta Braves organizations as well as in the Frontier League.

== Playing career ==
=== Chicago White Sox ===
Martínez signed with the Chicago White Sox as an amateur free agent in February 2006. From 2006 to 2012, Martínez played in the White Sox organization, reaching as high as the Double-A Birmingham Barons before becoming a minor league free agent on November 2, 2012.

=== Atlanta Braves ===
On March 23, 2013, Martínez signed a minor league contract with the Atlanta Braves. He spent the year with the Mississippi Braves and was a SOU South Division All-Star. On November 4, Martínez elected free agency.

=== Rockford Aviators ===
Martínez signed with the Rockford Aviators of the Frontier League, an independent league, for the 2014 season. In his time with the Aviators, Martínez slashed .337/.375/.444 in a little over 100 at-bats.

=== Atlanta Braves (second stint) ===
On June 20, 2014, he re-signed with the Braves and was assigned to the High-A Lynchburg Hillcats, where he hit .319/.375/.444.

=== Kansas City Royals ===
On January 28, 2015, Martínez signed with the Kansas City Royals. While playing for the Omaha Storm Chasers that year, his .384 batting average broke a modern-day Pacific Coast League (PCL) record. He also led the PCL in on-base percentage (OBP, .461) and was an All-Star. He batted .382 overall in 2015–which included rehab time in the Arizona League–good for the fifth-highest mark since the modern era of the minor leagues began in 1963. Martinez was ultimately seven hits short of batting .400 for the season.

The Royals added Martínez to the 40-man roster on November 6, 2015, and designated him for assignment on May 18, 2016, in favor of Whit Merrifield. One week later, they traded him to the St. Louis Cardinals for cash.

=== St. Louis Cardinals ===
After 887 games with 11 minor league teams, Martínez made his major league debut on September 6, 2016, against the Pittsburgh Pirates. He ground out as a pinch-hitter in the seventh inning in his first at-bat. His first major league hit and run batted in (RBI) occurred two days later, scoring Greg Garcia on an infield single in a 12−5 loss to the Milwaukee Brewers. For the season, he had seven hits in 16 at-bats.

The Cardinals announced that Martínez made their 2017 Opening Day roster, his first in the major leagues, after leading the club with 19 hits and 15 RBI in spring training. He hit his first major league home run against the Toronto Blue Jays on April 25. On August 6, 2017, Martínez hit his first major league career grand slam off Homer Bailey of the Cincinnati Reds, cementing a nine-run frame for the Cardinals in a 13–4 win. For the season, he batted .309/.379/.518.

Martínez began 2018 as St. Louis' starting first baseman. On June 8, 2018, he hit two home runs off of Matt Harvey of the Cincinnati Reds at Great American Ball Park, helping St. Louis defeat the Reds 7–6 in 10 innings. He finished his 2018 campaign slashing .305/.364/.457 with 17 home runs and 83 RBIs in 152 games, and led the majors in percentage of balls hit to the opposite field (34.7%), as well as in percentage of soft-hit batted balls (34.7%).

In February 2019, Martínez signed a two-year, $3.25 million contract with St. Louis. For the 2019 regular season, he batted .269/.340/.410 with 10 home runs and 42 RBIs over 128 games.

=== Tampa Bay Rays ===
On January 9, 2020, Martínez was traded to the Tampa Bay Rays along with Randy Arozarena and the Cardinals’ Competitive Balance Round A draft pick in exchange for Matthew Liberatore, Edgardo Rodriguez, and the Rays’ pick in Competitive Balance Round B.

=== Chicago Cubs ===
On August 30, 2020, Martínez was traded to the Chicago Cubs in exchange for Pedro Martinez and cash considerations. On December 2, Martínez was non-tendered by the Cubs.

=== New York Mets ===
On January 14, 2021, Martínez signed a one-year, split contract with the New York Mets, which included a $1 million option if he makes the team after spring training. On March 7, 2021, Martínez suffered a torn meniscus in his left knee after colliding with an umpire trying to field a ground ball, forcing him to be out for about four months. On April 1, Martínez was placed on the 60-day injured list. He played on a rehab assignment for the Syracuse Mets, but injured his elbow. Martínez elected free agency on October 29, without having appeared in a game for the Mets.

=== Acereros de Monclova ===
On March 15, 2022, Martínez signed with the Acereros de Monclova of the Mexican League. On Opening Day, he suffered a broken hand and was later put on the injured list. Martínez was released by the club on May 20.

=== Leones de Yucatán ===
On June 13, 2022, Martínez signed with the Leones de Yucatán of the Mexican League. He played in 38 games, hitting .346/.413/.459 with two home runs and 23 RBI. Martínez won the Mexican League Championship with the Leones in 2022. In 2023, he played in 88 games, hitting .316/.422/.511 with 15 home runs, 70 RBI, and one stolen base. Martínez became a free agent following the season.

On July 3, 2024, Martínez re–signed with the Leones. In 12 games for the team, he batted .350/.426/.500 with one home run and four RBI. Martínez became a free agent following the season.

On December 19, 2025, Martínez announced his retirement from professional baseball.

== Coaching career ==
On November 6, 2026, the Minnesota Twins announced they had hired Martínez to serve as a minor league hitting coach.

== Personal life ==
Martínez is a son of former infielder Carlos Martínez, who played seven seasons in MLB for the Cleveland Indians, White Sox and California Angels. He lives in Edwardsville, Illinois during the season.

Martínez has two children; one son, and one daughter.

== See also ==
- List of Major League Baseball players from Venezuela
- List of second-generation Major League Baseball players
