= Mike Girsch =

American baseball executive

- Born: 1975 or 1976
- Education: University of Notre Dame (BS); University of Chicago Booth School of Business (MBA)
- Employer: St. Louis Cardinals
- Title: Vice President and Senior Advisor
- Term: 2026–present

Michael Girsch (born 1975 or 1976) is an American professional baseball executive who is the vice president and senior advisor for the St. Louis Cardinals of Major League Baseball (MLB). He served as the Cardinals' general manager from 2017 to 2024 and vice president of special projects in 2025.

== Career ==
Girsch graduated from the University of Notre Dame with a bachelor of science in mathematics in 1998 and the University of Chicago Booth School of Business with a master of business administration in 2003. After business school he worked for Boston Consulting Group in Chicago.

In 2005, wanting to pursue a career in Major League Baseball (MLB), Girsch wrote an academic paper on the valuation of MLB draft picks and sent it to teams. John Mozeliak, the general manager (GM) of the St. Louis Cardinals, responded and hired him in 2006 as the coordinator for amateur scouting. He was promoted to director of baseball development in 2008 and to assistant general manager in 2011.

In 2017, the Cardinals promoted Mozeliak to the new position of president of baseball operations and promoted Girsch to GM. As GM, he signed Paul DeJong, Paul Goldschmidt, and Matt Carpenter to contract extensions. The Cardinals signed Girsch to a multi-year contract extension on October 17, 2022. After the 2024 season, Girsch was given the new title of vice president of special projects. After the 2025 season, his title was changed to vice president and senior advisor.

== Personal life ==
Girsch is from Hinsdale, Illinois, and graduated from Benet Academy. He and his wife live in Webster Groves, Missouri, and have four children.
