= Robert Stephenson (baseball) =

American baseball player (born 1993)

Free agent
- Pitcher
- Born: February 24, 1993 (age 33); Martinez, California, U.S.
- Bats: Right Throws: Right

MLB debut
- April 7, 2016, for the Cincinnati Reds

MLB statistics (through 2025 season)
- Win–loss record: 19–20
- Earned run average: 4.59
- Strikeouts: 416
- Stats at Baseball Reference

Teams
- Cincinnati Reds (2016–2020); Colorado Rockies (2021–2022); Pittsburgh Pirates (2022–2023); Tampa Bay Rays (2023); Los Angeles Angels (2025)

Robert William Stephenson (born February 24, 1993) is an American professional baseball pitcher who is a free agent. He has played in Major League Baseball (MLB) for the Cincinnati Reds, Colorado Rockies, Pittsburgh Pirates, Tampa Bay Rays, and Los Angeles Angels. A first-round pick of the Reds in the 2011 MLB draft, Stephenson made his MLB debut in 2016.

== Amateur career ==
Stephenson began pitching when he was nine years old. He attended Alhambra High School in Martinez, California, which he graduated from with a 4.2 grade point average. Stephenson's senior season for the high school's baseball team began with two consecutive no-hitters. He finished the season with an 8–2 win–loss record and 1.19 earned run average (ERA) in 76 2/3 innings pitched. He recorded 142 strikeouts, while walking 23 and allowing 29 hits. Alhambra reached the North Coast Section Division III playoffs' second round.

Stephenson was named the Gatorade California Baseball Player of the Year. He was rated by Baseball America as the 25th-best prospect in that year's draft, and the 12th best right-handed pitching prospect in the draft. He was invited to participate in the 2010 Aflac All-America Game; Stephenson was named the starting pitcher for the West Team and pitched two scoreless innings. Stephenson committed to attend the University of Washington to play college baseball for the Washington Huskies baseball team.

== Professional career ==
=== Cincinnati Reds ===
The Reds selected Stephenson in the first round of the 2011 Major League Baseball (MLB) draft, with the 27th overall selection. Stephenson became the Reds' first high school player chosen in the first round of the MLB draft since they chose catcher Devin Mesoraco in the first round of the 2007 draft, and the first prep school pitcher the organization had chosen in the first round since the selection of Homer Bailey in the 2004 draft. Stephenson signed with the Reds for a reported $2 million signing bonus. Baseball America rated Stephenson as one of the Reds' top ten prospects before the 2012 season, despite his not having made his professional debut. Stephenson began the 2012 season in extended spring training.

Stephenson made his professional debut with the Billings Mustangs of the Rookie-level Pioneer League on June 19, 2012. He pitched five innings and struck out eight batters. In seven games with Billings, Stephenson had a 2.05 ERA, allowing only 22 hits and eight walks in 30 2/3 innings pitched, while striking out 37. In July, the Reds promoted Stephenson to the Dayton Dragons of the Single–A Midwest League. For Dayton, Stephenson had a 4.19 ERA in eight starts, as he allowed 32 hits and 15 walks, while striking out 35 batters.

The Reds assigned Stephenson to begin the 2013 season with Dayton. After pitching to a 5–3 win–loss record and a 2.57 ERA with 96 strikeouts in 77 innings, he was promoted to the Bakersfield Blaze of the High–A California League on July 18. Less than a month later, after pitching to a 2–2 record and a 3.05 ERA with Bakersfield, the Reds promoted Stephenson to the Pensacola Blue Wahoos of the Double–A Southern League in August, as Reds' general manager Walt Jocketty said the team wanted to "fast track" Stephenson, whom he called "very impressive".

The Reds invited Stephenson to spring training as a non-roster invitee in 2014. The Reds assigned Stephenson to Pensacola. He appeared in the 2014 All-Star Futures Game. He had a 7–10 record and a 4.74 ERA while striking out 140 batters in 136 2/3 innings pitched with Pensacola. The Reds invited Stephenson to spring training in 2015. He began the season with Pensacola, where he pitched to a 3.68 ERA with 89 strikeouts in 78 1/3 innings, including a 2.36 ERA in his last ten starts, before he was promoted to the Louisville Bats of the Triple–A International League. After the season, the Reds added him to their 40-man roster.

After competing for a spot in the Reds' starting rotation for Opening Day during spring training in 2016, the Reds optioned him to Louisville to start the season. On April 4, with Homer Bailey beginning the season on the disabled list the Reds added Stephenson to their Opening Day roster. He made his MLB debut on April 7, and was optioned back to Louisville after the start. Stephenson was called up April 19, to make his second start in place of right-hander Alfredo Simon. In his second start, against the Colorado Rockies Stephenson became the first Reds pitcher to complete seven innings up to that point in the 2016 season, allowing just three hits and one earned run while striking out three and walking two. After the game, Stephenson was optioned back to Louisville. In 8 starts for the Reds, he finished 2–3 with a 6.08 ERA in 37 innings.

On July 22, 2017, Stephenson was recalled from Louisville. For the season, in 25 games, 11 starts, Stephenson finished 5–6 with a 4.68 ERA in 84 2/3 innings. He struck out 86 but walked 53 batters. He spent the majority of the 2018 season with Louisville, only making four appearances for Cincinnati towards the end of the season.

In 2019, Stephenson was used as a relief pitcher He appeared in 57 games, all out of the bullpen, and enjoyed career bests in ERA (3.76), WHIP (1.036), K/9 (11.3), BB/9 (3.3), and H/9 (6.0). Stephenson attributed his recent success to letting go of expectations and focusing on the present. In 2020, Stephenson recorded a 9.90 ERA with 13 strikeouts in 10 innings pitched, as eight of his 11 hits allowed were home runs.

=== Colorado Rockies ===
On November 25, 2020, Stephenson and Jameson Hannah were traded to the Colorado Rockies in exchange for Jeff Hoffman and Case Williams. In his first season in Colorado, Stephenson posted a 3.13 ERA in 49 games. He struck out 52 batters in 46 innings. He had a 6.04 ERA for the Rockies in 2022, with a 10.38 ERA in eight appearances in August, and was designated for assignment on August 25.

=== Pittsburgh Pirates ===
The Pittsburgh Pirates claimed Stephenson off of waivers on August 27, 2022. He had a 3.38 ERA in 13 1/3 innings with the Pirates. On January 13, 2023, Stephenson agreed to a one-year, $1.75 million contract with the Pirates, avoiding salary arbitration.

=== Tampa Bay Rays ===
On June 2, 2023, the Pirates traded Stephenson to the Tampa Bay Rays in exchange for Alika Williams. In 42 appearances out of the bullpen, he registered a 2.35 ERA with 60 strikeouts across 38 1/3 innings of work. Stephenson became a free agent following the season.

=== Los Angeles Angels ===
On January 23, 2024, Stephenson signed a three-year, $33 million contract with the Los Angeles Angels. On April 18, it was announced that Stephenson would miss the entirety of the season due to an undisclosed elbow injury. The following week, the injury was revealed to be a UCL injury that necessitated Tommy John surgery.

Stephenson returned to action in 2025, making rehab appearances for the Triple-A Salt Lake Bees and Single-A Inland Empire 66ers. On May 28, 2025, Stephenson was activated from the injured list to make his Angels debut. He made two scoreless appearances for Los Angeles before being placed back on the injured list with right biceps inflammation on June 2. Stephenson was transferred to the 60-day injured list on July 24. He was activated on August 22. In 12 appearances for Los Angeles, Stephenson logged a 2-0 record and 2.70 ERA with 10 strikeouts over 10 innings of work. On September 20, Stephenson was placed on the injured list due to right elbow inflammation, officially ending his season.

On March 14, 2026, it was announced that Stephenson had suffered a setback during spring training pitch sessions, which included possible damage to his UCL. On April 8, it was announced that Stephenson had undergone a season-ending ligament and flexor repair surgery. On October 30, the Angels declined their team option making him a free agent.

== Personal life ==
Stephenson and his wife married in 2017, with fellow Reds pitcher Sal Romano serving as the best man. Robert's mother, Rowena is a Filipino American from Pangasinan.
