= Daniel Ponce de Leon =

American baseball player (born 1992)

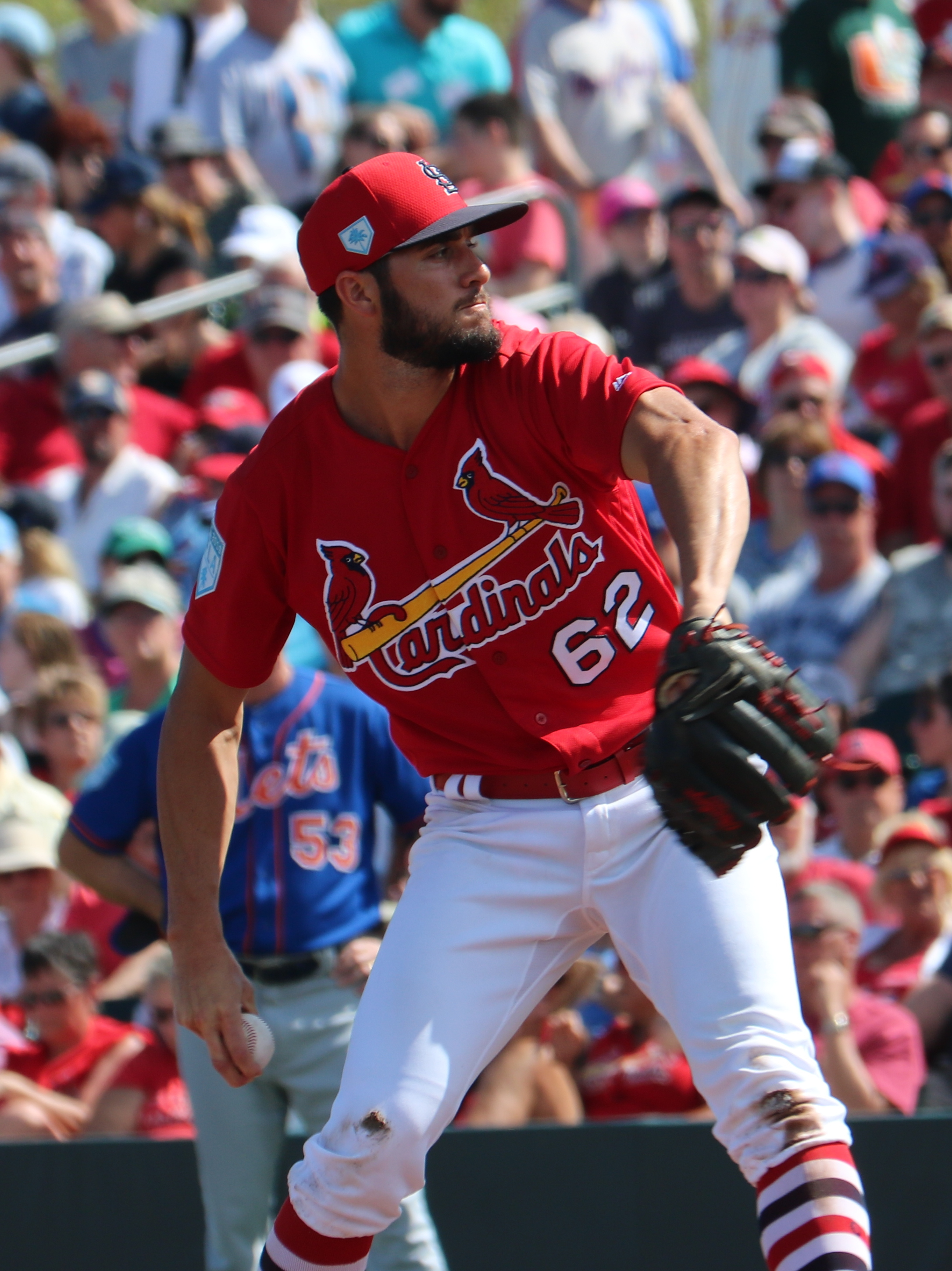
- Ponce de Leon with the Cardinals in 2019

Guerreros de Oaxaca – No. 15
- Pitcher
- Born: January 16, 1992 (age 34); Anaheim, California, U.S.
- Bats: Right Throws: Right

MLB debut
- July 23, 2018, for the St. Louis Cardinals

MLB statistics
- Win–loss record: 3–8
- Earned run average: 4.33
- Strikeouts: 152
- Stats at Baseball Reference

Teams
- St. Louis Cardinals (2018–2021)

Daniel Robert Ponce de Leon (born January 16, 1992), formerly known as Daniel Poncedeleon, is an American professional baseball pitcher for the Guerreros de Oaxaca of the Mexican League. He has previously played in Major League Baseball (MLB) for the St. Louis Cardinals.

== Amateur career ==
Ponce de Leon attended La Mirada High School in La Mirada, California. In 2010, his senior year, he went 6–3 with a 2.95 earned run average (ERA). The Tampa Bay Rays selected him in the 24th round of the 2010 MLB draft, but he did not sign and enrolled at the University of Arizona to play college baseball for the Arizona Wildcats. He pitched only three innings as a freshman, and then transferred to Cypress Junior College for the 2012 season. After that season, he was drafted by the Cincinnati Reds in the 38th round of the 2012 MLB draft, but once again did not sign. After the season, he transferred once again, this time to the University of Houston. In 15 starts for Houston for the 2013 season, he was 7–5 with a 4.47 ERA.

Following the season, Ponce de Leon was drafted by the Chicago Cubs in the 14th round of the 2013 MLB draft and the two parties had reached a deal. However, he failed his physical due to concerns about nerve placement in his elbow and did not sign. Ponce de Leon planned to return to Houston, but the NCAA ruled that he was ineligible to return. He then enrolled at Embry–Riddle Aeronautical University. In 14 starts, he was 9–2 with a 1.60 ERA, holding batters to a .196 batting average.

== Professional career ==
=== St. Louis Cardinals ===
After the season, the St. Louis Cardinals drafted Ponce de Leon in the ninth round of the 2014 MLB draft, and he signed.

After signing, Ponce de Leon made his professional debut that same season with the State College Spikes of the Low-A New York–Penn League. In 12 games (ten starts), he was 3–3 with a 2.44 ERA. In 2015, he pitched for the Peoria Chiefs of the Single-A Midwest League and the Palm Beach Cardinals of the High-A Florida State League, compiling a combined 11–2 record with a 2.12 ERA and a 1.10 walks plus hits divided by innings pitched in 20 games (19 starts), and in 2016, he pitched for the Springfield Cardinals of the Double-A Texas League, going 9–8 with a 2.53 ERA in 27 starts. He began 2017 with the Memphis Redbirds of the Triple-A Pacific Coast League.

On May 9, 2017, while pitching against Víctor Caratini of the Iowa Cubs, Caratini hit a line drive that struck Ponce de Leon in the head. He had emergency surgery and remained in the hospital for three weeks after the incident. He was cleared for baseball activities in August, but did not return to baseball until spring training 2018. He began 2018 with Memphis.

On June 11, 2018, the Cardinals promoted Ponce de Leon to the major leagues. In 12 games prior to his call-up, he was 5–2 with a Pacific Coast League-leading 2.41 ERA. He did not make an appearance with St. Louis and was optioned to Memphis on June 15. He was recalled again on July 23. He was 9–3 with a 2.15 ERA in 18 games (17 starts) with Memphis. He made his major league debut that night as St. Louis's starting pitcher at Great American Ball Park versus the Cincinnati Reds. In his debut, Ponce de Leon threw seven no-hit innings in which he struck out three and walked three on 116 pitches. He was optioned back to Memphis the next day, and recalled by St. Louis once again on July 27. In total in 2018 for St. Louis, Ponce de Leon made 11 appearances, with four being starts, posting a 0–2 record with a 2.73 ERA in 33 innings pitched.

Ponce de Leon began the 2019 season in Memphis, but was recalled to St. Louis multiple different times before he was called up for the remainder of the year on September 1. Through 48 2/3 innings pitched with St. Louis during the regular season, he went 1–2 with a 3.70 ERA, striking out 52. In a shortened 2020 season, he pitched to a 1–3 record with a 4.96 ERA and 45 strikeouts over nine games (eight starts) and 32 2/3 innings.

Ponce de Leon made 24 appearances with St. Louis in 2021, going 1–1 with a 6.21 ERA and 24 strikeouts. On September 20, 2021, the Cardinals designated Ponce de Leon for assignment. He was subsequently outrighted to the Memphis Redbirds. The following day, the Cardinals released him.

=== Los Angeles Angels ===
On January 25, 2022, Ponce de Leon signed a minor league contract with the Los Angeles Angels. Ponce de Leon was released by the Angels organization on April 4.

=== Seattle Mariners ===
On April 9, 2022, Ponce de Leon signed a minor league contract with the Seattle Mariners. He started 16 games for the Triple-A Tacoma Rainiers, struggling to a 5–8 record and 7.95 ERA with 80 strikeouts in 71 1/3 innings pitched. The Mariners released him on July 20.

=== Washington Nationals ===
On July 22, 2022, Ponce de Leon signed a minor league contract with the Washington Nationals organization. He started seven games for the Triple-A Rochester Red Wings, working to a 1–3 record and 5.65 ERA with 36 strikeouts in 28 2/3 innings of work. He was released on September 5.

=== Detroit Tigers ===
On September 9, 2022, Ponce de Leon signed a minor league contract with the Detroit Tigers and assigned to the Toledo Mud Hens. In three starts for Toledo, he registered a pristine 3–0 record and 1.69 ERA with 15 strikeouts in 16.0 innings of work. He elected free agency following the season on November 10.

=== Chicago White Sox ===
On April 12, 2023, Ponce de Leon signed a minor league contract with the Chicago White Sox. He made 8 appearances (7 starts) for the Triple–A Charlotte Knights, but struggled to a 1–4 record and 9.99 ERA with 19 strikeouts in 24 1/3 innings pitched. Ponce de Leon was released by the White Sox organization on June 8.

=== Diablos Rojos del México ===
On June 20, 2023, Ponce de Leon signed with the Diablos Rojos del México of the Mexican League. In six starts with the club, he worked to a 5.81 ERA with 24 strikeouts across 26 1/3 innings pitched.

In 16 games (nine starts) for the Diablos in 2024, Ponce de Leon compiled a 4–2 record and 4.04 ERA with 64 strikeouts over 42 1/3 innings pitched. With the team, he won the Serie del Rey. Ponce de Leon became a free agent following the season.

=== Guerreros de Oaxaca ===
On July 10, 2026, following a year of inactivity, Ponce de Leon signed with the Guerreros de Oaxaca of the Mexican League.

== Personal life ==
Ponce de Leon was born in Anaheim, California, on January 16, 1992, to Ramon and Mary Ponce de Leon. He has three sisters.

He married Jennifer Beatty in February 2018. The couple met while attending Embry–Riddle University. The couple's first child, a son, was born in November 2016. Their second child, a daughter, was born in February 2021.

His surname was originally spelled as one word, Poncedeleon, but he legally changed the spelling to three words, Ponce de Leon, in 2018.
