= Tyler Mahle =

American baseball player (born 1994)

Free agent
- Pitcher
- Born: September 29, 1994 (age 32); Newport Beach, California, U.S.
- Bats: Right Throws: Right

MLB debut
- August 27, 2017, for the Cincinnati Reds

MLB statistics (through 2026 season)
- Win–loss record: 46–56
- Earned run average: 4.05
- Strikeouts: 890
- Stats at Baseball Reference

Teams
- Cincinnati Reds (2017–2022); Minnesota Twins (2022–2023); Texas Rangers (2024–2025); San Francisco Giants (2026); Atlanta Braves (2026)

Tyler Fermin Mahle (/ˈmæliː/ MAL-ee; born September 29, 1994) is an American professional baseball pitcher who is a free agent. He has played in Major League Baseball (MLB) for the Cincinnati Reds, Minnesota Twins, Texas Rangers, San Francisco Giants, and Atlanta Braves. Mahle made his MLB debut in 2017 with the Reds.

== Amateur career ==
Mahle attended Westminster High School in Westminster, California. He committed to play college baseball at the University of California, Santa Barbara.

== Professional career ==
=== Cincinnati Reds ===
The Cincinnati Reds selected Mahle in the seventh round of the 2013 Major League Baseball draft. Mahle signed with the Reds and made his professional debut that same year with the Arizona League Reds, going 1–3 with a 2.36 ERA in 34 1/3 innings pitched.

He spent 2014 with the Billings Mustangs where he was 5–4 with a 3.87 ERA in 15 starts and 2015 with the Dayton Dragons where he pitched to a 13–8 record and 2.43 ERA in 27 games (26 starts). In 2016, he pitched for the Daytona Tortugas and the Pensacola Blue Wahoos, where he was 14–6 with a 3.64 ERA in 27 starts.

Mahle began 2017 with Pensacola. He pitched a perfect game for Pensacola on April 22, 2017, against the Mobile BayBears. He was later that season promoted to the Louisville Bats.

Mahle was called up to make his major league debut on August 27, 2017. In 24 starts between Pensacola and Louisville prior to his call up he was 10–7 with a 2.06 ERA and a 0.96 WHIP. On September 13 of the same year, Mahle pitched five shutout innings against the St. Louis Cardinals to earn his first MLB win. After being called up to the Reds, Mahle spent the rest of 2017 with the major league club. In four starts for the Reds, he was 1–2 with a 2.70 ERA.

Mahle began 2018 in Cincinnati's opening rotation, but didn't quite make it through the season. He was optioned to Louisville in August before being recalled in September. In 23 starts for the Reds, he went 7–9 with a 4.98 ERA. Mahle returned to Cincinnati's rotation to begin 2019. In 2019 for Cincinnati, Mahle pitched to a 3–12 record and a 5.14 ERA in 25 games, notching 129 strikeouts along the way. Mahle had a bounceback season in 2020, registering a 2–2 record and 3.59 ERA with 60 strikeouts in 47 2/3 innings of work. Mahle had perhaps his breakout season in 2021, when he went 13–6 with a 3.75 ERA and 210 strikeouts in 180 innings.

=== Minnesota Twins ===
On August 2, 2022, the Reds traded Mahle to the Minnesota Twins in exchange for Spencer Steer, Christian Encarnacion-Strand, and Steve Hajjar. He made 4 starts for the Twins to close out the year, posting a 1–1 record and 4.41 ERA with 12 strikeouts in 16 1/3 innings pitched.

On January 13, 2023, Mahle agreed to a one-year, $7.5 million contract with the Twins, avoiding salary arbitration. He began the 2023 season in Minnesota's rotation, making 5 starts. In an April 27 outing against the Kansas City Royals, Mahle departed after four innings with what was described as right posterior elbow soreness. He was placed on the 60-day injured list on May 5, with a right arm posterior impingement and flexor pronator strain. It was announced that Mahle would undergo Tommy John surgery, ending his 2023 season. He became a free agent following the season.

=== Texas Rangers ===
On December 14, 2023, Mahle signed a two-year contract with the Texas Rangers. He was placed on the injured list to begin the season as he continued to recover from surgery. Mahle was activated from the injured list on August 6, 2024. On August 20, the Rangers placed Mahle on the 15-day injured list with right shoulder tightness, and by September 3, manager Bruce Bochy confirmed Mahle wouldn't make another start in 2024. He ended his season making three starts, posting an ERA of 4.97, with a record of 0–1. He pitched in 12 2/3 innings, striking out 10, and walking four.

Mahle made 14 starts for Texas to begin the 2025 season, registering a 6–3 record and 2.34 ERA with 56 strikeouts over 77 innings of work. On June 15, 2025, Mahle was placed on injured list due to right shoulder fatigue; he was transferred to the 60-day injured list on July 1, after the injury was diagnosed as a rotator cuff strain. Mahle was activated on September 19.

=== San Francisco Giants ===
On January 5, 2026, Mahle signed a one-year, $10 million contract with the San Francisco Giants. In 18 starts for San Francisco, he posted a 3–9 record with a 5.13 ERA and 89 strikeouts over 94 2/3 innings.

=== Atlanta Braves ===
On August 2, 2026, the Giants traded Mahle to the Atlanta Braves in exchange for Anthony Molina.

== Personal life ==
Mahle's brother, Greg Mahle, also plays professional baseball.
