= 2019 Miami Marlins season =

2019 Miami Marlins
- League: National League
- Division: East
- Ballpark: Marlins Park
- City: Miami, Florida
- Record: 57–105 (.352)
- Divisional place: 5th
- Owners: Bruce Sherman and Derek Jeter
- President of baseball operations: Michael Hill
- Managers: Don Mattingly
- Television: Fox Sports Florida; Sun Sports (English: Paul Severino, Craig Minervini, Todd Hollandsworth) (Spanish: Raul Striker Jr., Cookie Rojas)
- Radio: WINZ; Miami Marlins Radio Network (English) (Dave Van Horne, Glenn Geffner); WAQI (Spanish) (Luis Quintana)

The 2019 Miami Marlins season was the 27th season for the Major League Baseball (MLB) franchise in the National League and the eighth as the "Miami" Marlins. The Marlins played their home games at Marlins Park as members of the National League East. They were unable to improve upon their record from the previous season, finished with the second worst record in the history of the franchise at 57–105, and were eliminated from the postseason for the sixteenth straight year. One highlight of their season was winning a season series over the Philadelphia Phillies for the first time since 2008, and sweeping them in a home series for the first time since 2009. They only won two other season series within the NL, against the Padres and Diamondbacks.

== Regular season ==
=== Season standings ===
NL East
Team	W	L	Pct.	GB	Home	Road
Atlanta Braves	97	65	.599	—	50‍–‍31	47‍–‍34
Washington Nationals	93	69	.574	4	50‍–‍31	43‍–‍38
New York Mets	86	76	.531	11	48‍–‍33	38‍–‍43
Philadelphia Phillies	81	81	.500	16	45‍–‍36	36‍–‍45
Miami Marlins	57	105	.352	40	30‍–‍51	27‍–‍54

Division leaders
Team	W	L	Pct.
Los Angeles Dodgers	106	56	.654
Atlanta Braves	97	65	.599
St. Louis Cardinals	91	71	.562

Wild Card teams (Top 2 teams qualify for postseason)
Team	W	L	Pct.	GB
Washington Nationals	93	69	.574	+4
Milwaukee Brewers	89	73	.549	—
New York Mets	86	76	.531	3
Arizona Diamondbacks	85	77	.525	4
Chicago Cubs	84	78	.519	5
Philadelphia Phillies	81	81	.500	8
San Francisco Giants	77	85	.475	12
Cincinnati Reds	75	87	.463	14
Colorado Rockies	71	91	.438	18
San Diego Padres	70	92	.432	19
Pittsburgh Pirates	69	93	.426	20
Miami Marlins	57	105	.352	32

=== Record vs. opponents ===
2019 National League record Source: MLB Standings Grid – 2019
Team	AZ	ATL	CHC	CIN	COL	LAD	MIA	MIL	NYM	PHI	PIT	SD	SF	STL	WSH	AL
Arizona	—	4–3	2–4	3–3	9–10	8–11	3–4	2–5	2–5	4–2	6–1	11–8	10–9	3–3	4–3	14–6
Atlanta	3–4	—	5–2	3–4	3–3	2–4	15–4	3–3	11–8	9–10	5–2	5–2	5–2	4–2	11–8	13–7
Chicago	4–2	2–5	—	8–11	3–3	3–4	6–1	9–10	5–2	2–5	11–8	4–3	4–2	9–10	2–4	12–8
Cincinnati	3–3	4–3	11–8	—	3–3	1–5	6–1	8–11	3–4	3–4	7–12	5–2	4–3	7–12	1–5	9–11
Colorado	10–9	3–3	3–3	3–3	—	4–15	5–2	5–2	2–4	3–4	2–5	11–8	7–12	2–5	3–4	8–12
Los Angeles	11–8	4–2	4–3	5–1	15–4	—	5–1	4–3	5–2	5–2	6–0	13–6	12–7	3–4	4–3	10–10
Miami	4–3	4–15	1–6	1–6	2–5	1–5	—	2–5	6–13	10–9	3–3	4–2	3–3	3–4	4–15	9–11
Milwaukee	5–2	3–3	10–9	11–8	2–5	3–4	5–2	—	5–1	4–3	15–4	3–4	2–4	9–10	4–2	8–12
New York	5–2	8–11	2–5	4–3	4–2	2–5	13–6	1–5	—	7–12	5–1	3–3	3–4	2–5	12–7	15–5
Philadelphia	2–4	10–9	5–2	4–3	4–3	2–5	9–10	3–4	12–7	—	4–2	3–3	3–4	4–2	5–14	11–9
Pittsburgh	1–6	2–5	8–11	12–7	5–2	0–6	3–3	4–15	1–5	2–4	—	6–1	5–2	5–14	3–4	12–8
San Diego	8–11	2–5	3–4	2–5	8–11	6–13	2–4	4–3	3–3	3–3	1–6	—	9–10	4–2	4–3	11–9
San Francisco	9–10	2–5	2–4	3–4	12–7	7–12	3–3	4–2	4–3	4–3	2–5	10–9	—	3–4	1–5	11–9
St. Louis	3–3	2–4	10–9	12–7	5–2	4–3	4–3	10–9	5–2	2–4	14–5	2–4	4–3	—	5–2	9–11
Washington	3–4	8–11	4–2	5–1	4–3	3–4	15–4	2–4	7–12	14–5	4–3	3–4	5–1	2–5	—	14–6

== Game log ==
2019 game log: 57–105 (Home: 30–51; Away: 27–54)
March/April: 8–21 (Home: 5–12; Away: 3–9)

#	Date	Opponent	Score	Win	Loss	Save	Attendance	Record	Box/Streak
1	March 28	Rockies	3–6	Freeland (1–0)	**Ureña** (0–1)	—	25,423	0–1	L1
2	March 29	Rockies	1–6	Marquez (1–0)	**Conley** (0–1)	—	6,503	0–2	L2
3	March 30	Rockies	7–3	**López** (1–0)	Anderson (0–1)	—	7,642	1–2	W1
4	March 31	Rockies	3–0	**Alcántara** (1–0)	Gray (0–1)	**Romo** (1)	7,559	2–2	W2
5	April 1	Mets	3–7	Familia (1–0)	**Steckenrider** (0–1)	—	6,489	2–3	L1
6	April 2	Mets	5–6	Vargas (1–0)	**Ureña** (0–2)	Wilson (1)	5,934	2–4	L2
7	April 3	Mets	4–6	deGrom (2–0)	**Richards** (0–1)	Díaz (3)	7,486	2–5	L3
8	April 5	@ Braves	0–4	Gausman (1–0)	**López** (1–1)	—	29,218	2–6	L4
9	April 6	@ Braves	4–2	**Romo** (1–0)	Minter (0–1)	**Conley** (1)	35,618	3–6	W1
10	April 7	@ Braves	3–4	Vizcaíno (1–0)	**Conley** (0–2)	—	32,551	3–7	L1
11	April 9	@ Reds	0–14	Castillo (1–1)	**Ureña** (0–3)	—	10,058	3–8	L2
12	April 10	@ Reds	1–2	Garrett (1–0)	**Steckenrider** (0–2)	Iglesias (1)	11,375	3–9	L3
13	April 11	@ Reds	0–5	Stephenson (1–0)	**López** (1–2)	—	11,192	3–10	L4
14	April 12	Phillies	1–9	Arrieta (2–1)	**Alcántara** (1–1)	—	9,322	3–11	L5
15	April 13	Phillies	10–3	**Smith** (1–0)	Eflin (2–1)	—	13,828	4–11	W1
16	April 14	Phillies	1–3 (14)	Arano (1–0)	**Chen** (0–1)	Álvarez (1)	15,238	4–12	L1
17	April 15	Cubs	2–7	Darvish (1–2)	**Richards** (0–2)	—	9,888	4–13	L2
18	April 16	Cubs	0–4	Quintana (2–1)	**López** (1–3)	—	8,137	4–14	L3
19	April 17	Cubs	0–6	Hamels (3–0)	**Alcántara** (1–2)	—	10,247	4–15	L4
20	April 19	Nationals	3–2	**Smith** (2–0)	Sánchez (0–2)	**Romo** (2)	8,199	5–15	W1
21	April 20	Nationals	9–3	**Ureña** (1–3)	Scherzer (1–3)	—	9,910	6–15	W2
22	April 21	Nationals	0–5	Strasburg (2–1)	**Richards** (0–3)	—	7,412	6–16	L1
23	April 23	@ Indians	3–1	**López** (2–3)	Ramírez (0–1)	**Romo** (3)	12,963	7–16	W1
24	April 24	@ Indians	2–6	Wittgren (1–0)	**Conley** (0–3)	—	13,046	7–17	L1
25	April 25	@ Phillies	3–1 (10)	**Guerrero** (1–0)	Neris (0–1)	**Romo** (4)	32,060	8–17	W1
26	April 26	@ Phillies	0–4	Eickhoff (1–1)	**Ureña** (1–4)	—	31,159	8–18	L1
27	April 27	@ Phillies	9–12	Arrieta (4–2)	**Richards** (0–4)	Neris (4)	37,868	8–19	L2
28	April 28	@ Phillies	1–5	Eflin (3–3)	**López** (2–4)	—	39,168	8–20	L3
29	April 30	Indians	4–7	Bauer (4–1)	**Alcántara** (1–3)	Hand (9)	7,247	8–21	L4

May: 11–15 (Home: 6–6; Away: 5–9)

#	Date	Opponent	Score	Win	Loss	Save	Attendance	Record	Box/Streak
30	May 1	Indians	4–2	**Smith** (3–0)	Kluber (2–3)	**Romo** (5)	7,262	9–21	W1
31	May 3	Braves	2–7	Toussaint (2–0)	**Ureña** (1–5)	—	7,198	9–22	L1
32	May 4	Braves	2–9	Soroka (3–1)	**Anderson** (0–1)	—	10,229	9–23	L2
33	May 5	Braves	1–3 (10)	Tomlin (1–0)	**Guerrero** (1–1)	Jackson (2)	11,885	9–24	L3
34	May 6	@ Cubs	6–5	**Conley** (1–3)	Strop (1–2)	**Romo** (6)	34,555	10–24	W1
35	May 7	@ Cubs	2–5	Cishek (1–1)	**Conley** (1–4)	—	35,274	10–25	L1
36	May 8	@ Cubs	2–3 (11)	Edwards Jr. (1–1)	**Quijada** (0–1)	—	37,241	10–26	L2
37	May 9	@ Cubs	1–4	Montgomery (1–0)	**Richards** (0–5)	—	32,301	10–27	L3
38	May 10	@ Mets	2–11	Wheeler (3–2)	**López** (2–5)	—	25,194	10–28	L4
39	May 11	@ Mets	1–4	deGrom (3–4)	**Alcántara** (1–4)	Díaz (10)	32,501	10–29	L5
—	May 12	@ Mets	**Postponed (Inclement weather)** (Makeup date: August 5)						
40	May 14	Rays	0–4	Morton (4–0)	**Smith** (3–1)	—	6,306	10–30	L6
41	May 15	Rays	0–1	Beeks (3–0)	**Ureña** (1–6)	Castillo (3)	5,947	10–31	L7
42	May 17	Mets	8–6	**Richards** (1–5)	deGrom (3–5)	**Romo** (7)	9,870	11–31	W1
43	May 18	Mets	2–0	**López** (3–5)	Matz (3–3)	**Conley** (2)	13,474	12–31	W2
44	May 19	Mets	3–0	**Alcántara** (2–4)	Syndergaard (3–4)	—	15,983	13–31	W3
45	May 21	@ Tigers	5–4 (11)	**Anderson** (1–1)	Jiménez (2–2)	—	15,565	14–31	W4
46	May 22	@ Tigers	6–3	**Ureña** (2–6)	Farmer (2–3)	**Romo** (8)	14,506	15–31	W5
47	May 23	@ Tigers	5–2	**Kinley** (1–0)	Greene (0–2)	**Romo** (9)	17,214	16–31	W6
48	May 24	@ Nationals	10–12	Barraclough (1–1)	**Anderson** (1–2)	Doolittle (9)	29,173	16–32	L1
49	May 25	@ Nationals	0–5	Corbin (5–2)	**Alcántara** (2–5)	—	33,163	16–33	L2
50	May 26	@ Nationals	5–9	Fedde (1–0)	**Smith** (3–2)	—	26,365	16–34	L3
51	May 27	@ Nationals	3–2	**Ureña** (3–6)	Barraclough (1–2)	**Romo** (10)	21,048	17–34	W1
52	May 28	Giants	11–3	**Richards** (2–5)	Samardzija (2–4)	—	6,407	18–34	W2
53	May 29	Giants	4–2	**Anderson** (2–2)	Bumgarner (3–5)	**Romo** (11)	6,487	19–34	W3
54	May 30	Giants	1–3	Moronta (2–4)	**Conley** (1–5)	Smith (13)	7,371	19–35	L1
55	May 31	@ Padres	2–5	Lucchesi (4–3)	**Smith** (3–3)	Yates (22)	25,019	19–36	L2

June: 13–14 (Home: 4–11; Away: 9–3)

#	Date	Opponent	Score	Win	Loss	Save	Attendance	Record	Box/Streak
56	June 1	@ Padres	9–3	**Ureña** (4–6)	Margevicius (2–6)	—	26,858	20–36	W1
57	June 2	@ Padres	9–3	**Richards** (3–5)	Strahm (2–5)	—	31,650	21–36	W2
58	June 4	@ Brewers	16–0	**López** (4–5)	Anderson (3–1)	—	25,364	22–36	W3
59	June 5	@ Brewers	8–3	**Alcántara** (3–5)	Nelson (0–1)	—	26,615	23–36	W4
60	June 6	@ Brewers	1–5	Peralta (3–2)	**Smith** (3–4)	Hader (14)	25,409	23–37	L1
61	June 7	Braves	1–7	Soroka (7–1)	**Ureña** (4–7)	—	8,589	23–38	L2
62	June 8	Braves	0–1	Teherán (4–4)	**Richards** (3–6)	Jackson (9)	9,771	23–39	L3
63	June 9	Braves	6–7 (12)	Winkler (3–1)	**Conley** (1–6)	Tomlin (1)	10,959	23–40	L4
64	June 10	Cardinals	1–4	Wacha (4–2)	**Alcántara** (3–6)	Hicks (13)	6,585	23–41	L5
65	June 11	Cardinals	1–7	Hudson (5–3)	**Hernández** (0–1)	—	6,308	23–42	L6
66	June 12	Cardinals	9–0	**Yamamoto** (1–0)	Mikolas (4–7)	—	7,001	24–42	W1
67	June 14	Pirates	0–11	Brault (3–1)	**Richards** (3–7)	—	8,340	24–43	L1
68	June 15	Pirates	4–3	**López** (5–5)	Hartlieb (0–1)	**Romo** (12)	11,464	25–43	W1
69	June 16	Pirates	4–5	Rodríguez (1–3)	**Anderson** (2–3)	Vázquez (16)	12,472	25–44	L1
70	June 17	@ Cardinals	0–5	Mikolas (5–7)	**Hernández** (0–2)	—	41,274	25–45	L2
71	June 18	@ Cardinals	6–0	**Yamamoto** (2–0)	Flaherty (4–4)	—	41,467	26–45	W1
72	June 19	@ Cardinals	1–2 (11)	Gant (7–0)	**Conley** (1–7)	—	40,126	26–46	L1
73	June 20	@ Cardinals	7–6 (11)	**García** (1–0)	Miller (3–3)	**Romo** (13)	42,446	27–46	W1
74	June 21	@ Phillies	2–1	**Alcántara** (4–6)	Nola (6–2)	**Romo** (14)	44,420	28–46	W2
75	June 22	@ Phillies	5–3	**Brice** (1–0)	Morgan (2–2)	**Quijada** (1)	44,722	29–46	W3
76	June 23	@ Phillies	6–4	**Yamamoto** (3–0)	De Los Santos (0–1)	**Anderson** (1)	36,749	30–46	W4
77	June 25	Nationals	1–6	Scherzer (7–5)	**Richards** (3–8)	—	7,327	30–47	L1
78	June 26	Nationals	5–7	Corbin (7–5)	**Gallen** (0–1)	Doolittle (17)	6,276	30–48	L2
79	June 27	Nationals	5–8	Strasburg (9–4)	**Alcántara** (4–7)	—	7.751	30–49	L3
80	June 28	Phillies	6–2	**Hernández** (1–2)	Velasquez (2–5)	—	9,469	31–49	W1
81	June 29	Phillies	9–6	**García** (2–0)	Morgan (2–3)	**Romo** (15)	14,774	32–49	W2
82	June 30	Phillies	6–13	Arrieta (8–6)	**Richards** (3–9)	—	11,742	32–50	L1

July: 9–15 (Home: 6–6; Away: 3–9)

#	Date	Opponent	Score	Win	Loss	Save	Attendance	Record	Box/Streak
83	July 2	@ Nationals	2–3	Doolittle (5–2)	**Quijada** (0–2)	—	21,361	32–51	L2
84	July 3	@ Nationals	1–3	Strasburg (10–4)	**Alcántara** (4–8)	Doolittle (19)	25,483	32–52	L3
85	July 4	@ Nationals	2–5	Sánchez (5–6)	**Hernández** (1–3)	Rodney (2)	27,350	32–53	L4
86	July 5	@ Braves	0–1	Jackson (4–2)	**Quijada** (0–3)	—	41,102	32–54	L5
87	July 6	@ Braves	5–4	**Smith** (4–4)	Fried (9–4)	**Romo** (16)	37,216	33–54	W1
88	July 7	@ Braves	3–4	Keuchel (2–2)	**Richards** (3–10)	Jackson (14)	30,514	33–55	L1
89	July 12	Mets	8–4	**Smith** (5–4)	Vargas (3–5)	—	11,856	34–55	W1
90	July 13	Mets	2–4	Syndergaard (7–4)	**Anderson** (2–4)	Díaz (20)	12,963	34–56	L1
91	July 14	Mets	2–6	deGrom (5–7)	**Alcántara** (4–9)	—	14,780	34–57	L2
92	July 16	Padres	12–7	**Yamamoto** (4–0)	Allen (2–2)	—	8,151	35–57	W1
93	July 17	Padres	2–3	Paddack (6–4)	**Richards** (3–11)	Yates (31)	7,818	35–58	L1
94	July 18	Padres	4–3	**Romo** (2–0)	Wingenter (1–3)	—	21,149	36–58	W1
95	July 19	@ Dodgers	1–2	Ryu (11–2)	**Gallen** (0–2)	Jansen (24)	52,471	36–59	L1
96	July 20	@ Dodgers	6–10	Báez (5–2)	**Hernández** (1–4)	—	53,778	36–60	L2
97	July 21	@ Dodgers	0–9	Buehler (9–1)	**Yamamoto** (4–1)	—	47,469	36–61	L3
98	July 22	@ White Sox	1–9	Nova (5–9)	**Richards** (3–12)	—	14,471	36–62	L4
99	July 23	@ White Sox	5–1	**Smith** (6–4)	Covey (1–6)	—	14,043	37–62	W1
100	July 24	@ White Sox	2–0	**Gallen** (1–2)	López (5–9)	**Romo** (17)	19,098	38–62	W2
101	July 26	Diamondbacks	3–2	**Quijada** (1–3)	Holland (1–2)	—	8,867	39–62	W3
102	July 27	Diamondbacks	2–9	Young (4–0)	**Yamamoto** (4–2)	—	13,047	39–63	L1
103	July 28	Diamondbacks	5–1	**Quijada** (2–3)	Ray (9–7)	—	11,538	40–63	W1
104	July 29	Diamondbacks	11–6	**Smith** (7–4)	Kelly (7–11)	—	7,048	41–63	W2
105	July 30	Twins	1–2	Odorizzi (12–5)	**Gallen** (1–3)	Rogers (16)	8,064	41–64	L1
106	July 31	Twins	4–7	Berríos (10–5)	**Alcántara** (4–10)	—	8,567	41–65	L2

August: 7–22 (Home: 7–8; Away: 0–14)

#	Date	Opponent	Score	Win	Loss	Save	Attendance	Record	Box/Streak
107	August 1	Twins	5–4 (12)	**Brigham** (1–0)	Stashak (0–1)	—	10,390	42–65	W1
108	August 3	@ Rays	6–8	Anderson (3–4)	**García** (1–2)	Pagán (9)	14,092	42–66	L1
109	August 4	@ Rays	2–7	Chirinos (9–5)	**Smith** (7–5)	—	14,819	42–67	L2
110	August 5	@ Mets	2–6	deGrom (7–7)	**Dugger** (0–1)	—	N/A	42–68	L3
111	August 5	@ Mets	4–5	Familia (3–1)	**Brigham** (1–1)	Lugo (2)	29,645	42–69	L4
112	August 6	@ Mets	0–5	Wheeler (9–6)	**Noesí** (0–1)	—	27,479	42–70	L5
113	August 7	@ Mets	2–7	Matz (7–7)	**Yamamoto** (4–3)	—	26,349	42–71	L6
114	August 8	Braves	9–2	**Hernández** (2–4)	Keuchel (3–5)	—	8,948	43–71	W1
115	August 9	Braves	4–8	Teherán (7–7)	**Smith** (7–6)	—	8,057	43–72	L1
116	August 10	Braves	7–6 (10)	**Brigham** (2–1)	Newcomb (5–2)	—	29,720	44–72	W1
117	August 11	Braves	4–5	Foltynewicz (4–5)	**Noesí** (0–2)	Jackson (18)	12,338	44–73	L1
118	August 13	Dodgers	1–15	May (1–1)	**Yamamoto** (4–4)	—	8,729	44–74	L2
119	August 14	Dodgers	1–9	Kershaw (12–2)	**Hernández** (2–5)	—	8,810	44–75	L3
120	August 15	Dodgers	13–7	**Smith** (8–6)	Buehler (10–3)	—	8,471	45–75	W1
121	August 16	@ Rockies	0–3	Gray (11–8)	**Alcántara** (4–11)	Oberg (5)	35,018	45–76	L1
122	August 17	@ Rockies	4–11	Márquez (12–5)	**Noesí** (0–3)	—	40,199	45–77	L2
123	August 18	@ Rockies	6–7 (10)	Estévez (2–2)	**Brigham** (2–2)	—	38,181	45–78	L3
124	August 20	@ Braves	1–5	Keuchel (4–5)	**Kinley** (1–1)	—	21,271	45–79	L4
125	August 21	@ Braves	0–5	Teherán (8–8)	**Smith** (8–7)	—	23,537	45–80	L5
126	August 22	@ Braves	2–3	Melancon (5–2)	**Stanek** (0–3)	—	23,967	45–81	L6
127	August 23	Phillies	19–11	**Kinley** (2–1)	Pivetta (4–6)	—	9,065	46–81	W1
128	August 24	Phillies	3–9	Eflin (8–11)	**Yamamoto** (4–5)	—	12,981	46–82	L1
129	August 25	Phillies	3–2	**Hernández** (3–5)	Nola (12–4)	**Stanek** (1)	9,286	47–82	W1
130	August 26	Reds	3–6	Gray (10–6)	**López** (5–6)	—	5,297	47–83	L1
131	August 27	Reds	5–8	Castillo (13–5)	**Smith** (8–8)	Iglesias (27)	6,169	47–84	L2
132	August 28	Reds	0–5	DeSclafani (9–7)	**Alcántara** (4–12)	—	6,409	47–85	L3
133	August 29	Reds	4–3 (12)	**Kinley** (3–1)	Iglesias (2–10)	—	6,466	48–85	W1
134	August 30	@ Nationals	6–7	Hudson (8–3)	**Stanek** (0–4)	—	26,201	48–86	L1
135	August 31	@ Nationals	0–7	Strasburg (16–5)	**López** (5–7)	—	27,539	48–87	L2

September: 9–18 (Home: 2–8; Away: 7–10)

#	Date	Opponent	Score	Win	Loss	Save	Attendance	Record	Box/Streak
136	September 1	@ Nationals	3–9	Corbin (11–6)	**Smith** (8–9)	—	29,345	48–88	L3
137	September 3	@ Pirates	5–4 (10)	**Conley** (2–7)	Markel (0–1)	**Ureña** (1)	9,169	49–88	W1
138	September 4	@ Pirates	5–6	Wang (2–0)	**Ureña** (4–8)	—	9,043	49–89	L1
139	September 5	@ Pirates	10–7	**Moran** (1–0)	Agrazal (4–4)	—	9,642	50–89	W1
140	September 6	Royals	0–3	López (3–7)	**López** (5–8)	Kennedy (27)	8,915	50–90	L1
141	September 7	Royals	2–7	Duffy (6–6)	**Conley** (2–8)	Hill (1)	13,112	50–91	L2
142	September 8	Royals	9–0	**Alcántara** (5–12)	Montgomery (3–8)	—	10,934	51–91	W1
143	September 9	Brewers	3–8	Albers (6–5)	**Dugger** (0–2)	—	6,672	51–92	L1
144	September 10	Brewers	3–4	Guerra (9–5)	**Conley** (2–9)	Pomeranz (1)	7,215	51–93	L2
145	September 11	Brewers	5–7	Suter (2–0)	**Ureña** (4–9)	Hader (30)	7,815	51–94	L3
146	September 12	Brewers	2–3	Peralta (6–3)	**Smith** (8–10)	Hader (31)	7,375	51–95	L4
147	September 13	@ Giants	0–1	Beede (5–9)	**Alcántara** (5–13)	Anderson (2)	33,418	51–96	L5
148	September 14	@ Giants	4–2	**García** (3–1)	Anderson (3–5)	**Ureña** (2)	38,663	52–96	W1
149	September 15	@ Giants	1–2	Rogers (2–0)	**García** (3–2)	Smith (33)	39,663	52–97	L1
150	September 16	@ Diamondbacks	5–7	Hirano (5–5)	**Guerrero** (1–2)	Ginkel (1)	15,897	52–98	L2
151	September 17	@ Diamondbacks	12–6	**Smith** (9–10)	Andriese (5–5)	—	19,745	53–98	W1
152	September 18	@ Diamondbacks	4–5	Leake (12–11)	**Alcantara** (5–14)	Bradley (15)	17,731	53–99	L1
153	September 20	Nationals	4–6	Sánchez (10–8)	**Dugger** (0–3)	Hudson (5)	12,775	53–100	L2
154	September 21	Nationals	4–10 (10)	Suero (6–8)	**Ureña** (4–10)	—	18,085	53–101	L3
155	September 22	Nationals	5–3	**García** (4–2)	Suero (6–9)	**Brigham** (1)	19,709	54–101	L3
156	September 23	@ Mets	8–4	**Smith** (10–10)	Matz (10–10)	—	21,189	55–101	W1
157	September 24	@ Mets	4–5 (11)	Sewald (1–1)	**Conley** (2–10)	—	21,766	55–102	L1
158	September 25	@ Mets	3–10	deGrom (11–8)	**Dugger** (0–4)	—	21,471	55–103	L2
159	September 26	@ Mets	4–2	**Brigham** (3–2)	Wheeler (11–8)	**Ureña** (3)	21,729	56–103	W1
160	September 27	@ Phillies	4–5 (15)	Suárez (6–1)	**Conley** (2–11)	—	24,143	56–104	L1
161	September 28	@ Phillies	3–9	Eflin (10–13)	**Smith** (10–11)	—	25,156	56–105	L2
162	September 29	@ Phillies	4–3	**Alcántara** (6–14)	Parker (3–3)	**Kinley** (1)	31,805	57–105	W1

Legend: = Win = Loss = Postponement
Bold = Marlins team member

== Roster ==
2019 Miami Marlins
Roster
Pitchers: 22 Sandy Alcántara; 70 Nick Anderson; 37 Austin Brice; 43 Jeff Brigham; 20 Wei-Yin Chen; 61 Adam Conley; 64 Robert Dugger; 52 Zac Gallen; 66 Jarlin García; 56 Tayron Guerrero; 57 Elieser Hernández; 72 Kyle Keller; 39 Tyler Kinley; 49 Pablo López; 63 Brian Moran; 48 Héctor Noesí; 74 José Quijada; 36 Trevor Richards; 54 Sergio Romo; 31 Caleb Smith; 68 Josh Smith; 35 Ryne Stanek; 71 Drew Steckenrider; 62 José Ureña; 50 Jordan Yamamoto	Catchers: 38 Jorge Alfaro; 58 Wilkin Castillo; 51 Tyler Heineman; 28 Bryan Holaday; 17 Chad Wallach; Infielders: 15 Brian Anderson; 55 Jon Berti; 13 Starlin Castro; 26 Garrett Cooper; 1 Isan Díaz; 7 Deven Marrero; 14 Martín Prado; 2 Yadiel Rivera; 19 Miguel Rojas; 18 Neil Walker	Outfielders: 9 Lewis Brinson; 44 Austin Dean; 79 Isaac Galloway; 21 Curtis Granderson; 5 Rosell Herrera; 45 Peter O'Brien; 46 César Puello; 47 Harold Ramírez; 10 J. T. Riddle; 34 Magneuris Sierra	Manager: 8 Don Mattingly; Coaches: -- Eric Duncan (assistant hitting); 85 Rob Flippo (bullpen coordinator); 33 Fredi González (third base); 3 Trey Hillman (first base); 25 Jeff Livesey (assistant hitting/hitting); 6 Mike Pagliarulo (hitting); 23 Brian Schneider (catching); 30 Mel Stottlemyre Jr. (pitching); 41 Dean Treanor (bullpen); 29 Tim Wallach (bench)

== Player stats ==
=== Batting ===
Note: G = Games played; AB = At bats; R = Runs; H = Hits; 2B = Doubles; 3B = Triples; HR = Home runs; RBI = Runs batted in; SB = Stolen bases; BB = Walks; AVG = Batting average; SLG = Slugging average

Player	G	AB	R	H	2B	3B	HR	RBI	SB	BB	AVG	SLG
Starlin Castro	162	636	68	172	31	4	22	86	2	28	.270	.436
Miguel Rojas	132	483	52	137	29	1	5	46	9	32	.284	.379
Brian Anderson	126	459	57	120	33	1	20	66	5	44	.261	.468
Jorge Alfaro	130	431	44	113	14	1	18	57	4	22	.262	.425
Harold Ramírez	119	421	54	116	20	3	11	50	2	18	.276	.416
Garrett Cooper	107	381	52	107	16	1	15	50	0	33	.281	.446
Neil Walker	115	337	37	88	19	1	8	38	3	42	.261	.395
Curtis Granderson	138	317	44	58	17	1	12	34	0	41	.183	.356
Jon Berti	73	256	52	70	14	1	6	24	17	24	.273	.406
Martín Prado	104	245	26	57	9	0	2	15	0	12	.233	.294
Lewis Brinson	75	226	15	39	9	1	0	15	1	13	.173	.221
Isan Díaz	49	179	17	31	5	2	5	23	0	19	.173	.307
Austin Dean	64	178	17	40	14	0	6	21	0	9	.225	.404
J. T. Riddle	51	132	15	25	6	0	6	12	0	5	.189	.371
Bryan Holaday	43	115	12	32	6	0	4	12	0	11	.278	.435
Rosell Herrera	63	105	10	21	6	0	2	11	4	11	.200	.314
César Puello	32	84	8	15	2	0	1	6	0	7	.179	.238
Yadiel Rivera	34	60	8	11	2	0	0	3	2	6	.183	.217
Isaac Galloway	19	54	6	9	1	0	0	1	2	0	.167	.185
Chad Wallach	19	48	4	12	3	0	1	3	0	6	.250	.375
Peter O'Brien	14	42	2	7	1	0	1	4	1	4	.167	.262
Magneuris Sierra	15	40	5	14	1	1	0	1	3	2	.350	.425
Tyler Heineman	5	11	1	3	1	0	1	2	0	0	.273	.636
Wilkin Castillo	2	7	0	1	1	0	0	2	0	0	.143	.286
Deven Marrero	5	5	0	0	0	0	0	0	0	0	.000	.000
Pitcher totals	162	260	9	28	5	0	0	11	0	6	.108	.127
Team totals	162	5512	615	1326	265	18	146	593	55	395	.241	.375

=== Pitching ===
Note: W = Wins; L = Losses; ERA = Earned run average; G = Games pitched; GS = Games started; SV = Saves; IP = Innings pitched; H = Hits allowed; R = Runs allowed; ER = Earned runs allowed; BB = Walks allowed; SO = Strikeouts

Player	W	L	ERA	G	GS	SV	IP	H	R	ER	BB	SO
Sandy Alcántara	6	14	3.88	32	32	0	197.1	179	94	85	81	151
Caleb Smith	10	11	4.52	28	28	0	153.1	128	82	77	60	168
Trevor Richards	3	12	4.50	23	20	0	112.0	104	56	56	51	103
Pablo López	5	8	5.09	21	21	0	111.1	111	64	63	27	95
José Ureña	4	10	5.21	24	13	3	84.2	99	53	49	26	62
Elieser Hernández	3	5	5.03	21	15	0	82.1	76	49	46	26	85
Jordan Yamamoto	4	5	4.46	15	15	0	78.2	54	42	39	36	82
Wei-Yin Chen	0	1	6.59	45	0	0	68.1	87	54	50	18	63
Adam Conley	2	11	6.53	60	0	2	60.2	76	45	44	29	53
Jarlin García	4	2	3.02	53	0	0	50.2	40	17	17	16	39
Tyler Kinley	3	1	3.65	52	0	1	49.1	43	20	20	36	46
Tayron Guerrero	1	2	6.26	52	0	0	46.0	42	34	32	36	43
Austin Brice	1	0	3.43	36	0	0	44.2	37	21	17	18	46
Nick Anderson	2	4	3.92	45	0	1	43.2	40	19	19	16	69
Jeff Brigham	3	2	4.46	32	0	1	38.1	36	20	19	14	39
Sergio Romo	2	0	3.58	38	0	17	37.2	33	18	15	13	33
Zac Gallen	1	3	2.72	7	7	0	36.1	25	12	11	18	43
Robert Dugger	0	4	5.77	7	7	0	34.1	33	26	22	17	25
José Quijada	2	3	5.76	34	0	1	29.2	27	20	19	26	44
Héctor Noesí	0	3	8.46	12	4	0	27.2	30	26	26	14	24
Ryne Stanek	0	2	5.48	22	0	1	21.1	17	15	13	19	28
Drew Steckenrider	0	2	6.28	15	0	0	14.1	9	10	10	5	14
Kyle Keller	0	0	3.38	10	0	0	10.2	5	4	4	8	11
Brian Moran	1	0	4.26	10	0	0	6.1	6	3	3	2	10
Josh Smith	0	0	8.31	6	0	0	4.1	3	4	4	3	2
Bryan Holaday	0	0	0.00	1	0	0	0.1	0	0	0	0	0
Team totals	57	105	4.74	162	162	27	1444.1	1340	808	760	615	1378

== Farm system ==
Level	Team	League	Manager
AAA	New Orleans Baby Cakes	Pacific Coast League	Keith Johnson
AA	Jacksonville Jumbo Shrimp	Southern League	Kevin Randel
A-Advanced	Jupiter Hammerheads	Florida State League	Todd Pratt
A	Clinton LumberKings	Midwest League	Mike Jacobs
A-Short Season	Batavia Muckdogs	New York–Penn League	Jorge Hernandez
Rookie	GCL Marlins	Gulf Coast League	
Rookie	DSL Marlins	Dominican Summer League	
