= 2019 Philadelphia Phillies season =

2019 Philadelphia Phillies
- League: National League
- Division: East
- Ballpark: Citizens Bank Park
- City: Philadelphia
- Record: 81–81 (.500)
- Divisional place: 4th
- Owners: John Middleton, Bill Giles, David Montgomery
- General managers: Matt Klentak
- Managers: Gabe Kapler
- Television: NBC Sports Philadelphia; NBC Sports Philadelphia + NBC Philadelphia (Tom McCarthy, John Kruk, Ben Davis, Mike Schmidt, Jimmy Rollins, Gregg Murphy)
- Radio: Phillies Radio Network; WIP SportsRadio 94.1 FM (English) (Scott Franzke, Larry Andersen, Jim Jackson, Kevin Frandsen); WTTM (Spanish) (Danny Martinez, Bill Kulik, Rickie Ricardo)
- Stats: ESPN.com; Baseball Reference

The 2019 Philadelphia Phillies season was the 137th season in the history of the franchise, their 16th season at Citizens Bank Park, and their final season with manager Gabe Kapler. The Phillies improved from their record the prior year and finished with an 81–81 record (.500 winning percentage) for the first time since 2012, but missed the playoffs for the eighth straight season, despite spending nearly $400 million in the offseason.

== Offseason ==
After an 80–82 record the previous season which included a late-season collapse, the Phillies made several transactions in the 2018–19 offseason in order to improve the team. On December 3, 2018, the Phillies acquired Jean Segura, Juan Nicasio, and James Pazos from the Seattle Mariners for Carlos Santana and J. P. Crawford. Three days later, the Phillies traded relief pitcher Luis Garcia to the Los Angeles Angels for relief pitcher José Álvarez. Free agent outfielder Andrew McCutchen was signed December 12 to a three-year deal. Relief pitcher David Robertson signed a two-year deal with the Phillies on January 3, 2019. On February 7, the Phillies acquired catcher J. T. Realmuto from the Miami Marlins for Sixto Sanchez, Jorge Alfaro, Will Stewart and international bonus slot money. Finally, on March 2, the Phillies signed outfielder Bryce Harper to a record-breaking 13-year deal worth $330 million.

== Season standings ==
=== National League East ===
NL East
Team	W	L	Pct.	GB	Home	Road
Atlanta Braves	97	65	.599	—	50‍–‍31	47‍–‍34
Washington Nationals	93	69	.574	4	50‍–‍31	43‍–‍38
New York Mets	86	76	.531	11	48‍–‍33	38‍–‍43
Philadelphia Phillies	81	81	.500	16	45‍–‍36	36‍–‍45
Miami Marlins	57	105	.352	40	30‍–‍51	27‍–‍54

=== National League Wild Card ===
Division leaders
Team	W	L	Pct.
Los Angeles Dodgers	106	56	.654
Atlanta Braves	97	65	.599
St. Louis Cardinals	91	71	.562

Wild Card teams (Top 2 teams qualify for postseason)
Team	W	L	Pct.	GB
Washington Nationals	93	69	.574	+4
Milwaukee Brewers	89	73	.549	—
New York Mets	86	76	.531	3
Arizona Diamondbacks	85	77	.525	4
Chicago Cubs	84	78	.519	5
Philadelphia Phillies	81	81	.500	8
San Francisco Giants	77	85	.475	12
Cincinnati Reds	75	87	.463	14
Colorado Rockies	71	91	.438	18
San Diego Padres	70	92	.432	19
Pittsburgh Pirates	69	93	.426	20
Miami Marlins	57	105	.352	32

=== Record vs. opponents ===
2019 National League record Source: MLB Standings Grid – 2019
Team	AZ	ATL	CHC	CIN	COL	LAD	MIA	MIL	NYM	PHI	PIT	SD	SF	STL	WSH	AL
Arizona	—	4–3	2–4	3–3	9–10	8–11	3–4	2–5	2–5	4–2	6–1	11–8	10–9	3–3	4–3	14–6
Atlanta	3–4	—	5–2	3–4	3–3	2–4	15–4	3–3	11–8	9–10	5–2	5–2	5–2	4–2	11–8	13–7
Chicago	4–2	2–5	—	8–11	3–3	3–4	6–1	9–10	5–2	2–5	11–8	4–3	4–2	9–10	2–4	12–8
Cincinnati	3–3	4–3	11–8	—	3–3	1–5	6–1	8–11	3–4	3–4	7–12	5–2	4–3	7–12	1–5	9–11
Colorado	10–9	3–3	3–3	3–3	—	4–15	5–2	5–2	2–4	3–4	2–5	11–8	7–12	2–5	3–4	8–12
Los Angeles	11–8	4–2	4–3	5–1	15–4	—	5–1	4–3	5–2	5–2	6–0	13–6	12–7	3–4	4–3	10–10
Miami	4–3	4–15	1–6	1–6	2–5	1–5	—	2–5	6–13	10–9	3–3	4–2	3–3	3–4	4–15	9–11
Milwaukee	5–2	3–3	10–9	11–8	2–5	3–4	5–2	—	5–1	4–3	15–4	3–4	2–4	9–10	4–2	8–12
New York	5–2	8–11	2–5	4–3	4–2	2–5	13–6	1–5	—	7–12	5–1	3–3	3–4	2–5	12–7	15–5
Philadelphia	2–4	10–9	5–2	4–3	4–3	2–5	9–10	3–4	12–7	—	4–2	3–3	3–4	4–2	5–14	11–9
Pittsburgh	1–6	2–5	8–11	12–7	5–2	0–6	3–3	4–15	1–5	2–4	—	6–1	5–2	5–14	3–4	12–8
San Diego	8–11	2–5	3–4	2–5	8–11	6–13	2–4	4–3	3–3	3–3	1–6	—	9–10	4–2	4–3	11–9
San Francisco	9–10	2–5	2–4	3–4	12–7	7–12	3–3	4–2	4–3	4–3	2–5	10–9	—	3–4	1–5	11–9
St. Louis	3–3	2–4	10–9	12–7	5–2	4–3	4–3	10–9	5–2	2–4	14–5	2–4	4–3	—	5–2	9–11
Washington	3–4	8–11	4–2	5–1	4–3	3–4	15–4	2–4	7–12	14–5	4–3	3–4	5–1	2–5	—	14–6

== Game log ==
Legend
	Phillies win
	Phillies loss
	Postponement
**Bold**	Phillies team member

2019 Game Log Overall Record: 81–81
March (3–0)

#	Date	Opponent	Score	Win	Loss	Save	Attendance	Record
1	March 28	Braves	10–4	**Aaron Nola** (1–0)	Julio Teherán (0–1)	—	44,469	1–0
2	March 30	Braves	8–6	**Adam Morgan** (1–0)	Wes Parsons (0–1)	—	44,597	2–0
3	March 31	Braves	5–1	**Jake Arrieta** (1–0)	Kyle Wright (0–1)	—	41,410	3–0

April (13–13)

#	Date	Opponent	Score	Win	Loss	Save	Attendance	Record
4	April 2	@ Nationals	8–2	**Zach Eflin** (1–0)	Max Scherzer (0–2)	—	35,920	4–0
5	April 3	@ Nationals	8–9	Sean Doolittle (2–0)	**David Robertson** (0–1)	—	20,050	4–1
6	April 5	Twins	10–4	**Nick Pivetta** (1–0)	Jake Odorizzi (0–1)	—	28,021	5–1
7	April 6	Twins	2–6	Michael Pineda (1–0)	**Jake Arrieta** (1–1)	—	44,693	5–2
8	April 7	Twins	2–1	**Zach Eflin** (2–0)	José Berríos (1–1)	**Héctor Neris** (1)	39,735	6–2
9	April 8	Nationals	4–3	**Seranthony Domínguez** (1–0)	Aníbal Sánchez (0–1)	**Pat Neshek** (1)	28,212	7–2
10	April 9	Nationals	6–10 (10)	Sean Doolittle (3–0)	**José Álvarez** (0–1)	—	38,073	7–3
11	April 10	Nationals	1–15	Jeremy Hellickson (1–0)	**Nick Pivetta** (1–1)	—	30,805	7–4
12	April 12	@ Marlins	9–1	**Jake Arrieta** (2–1)	Sandy Alcántara (1–1)	—	9,322	8–4
13	April 13	@ Marlins	3–10	Caleb Smith (1–0)	**Zach Eflin** (2–1)	—	13,828	8–5
14	April 14	@ Marlins	3–1 (14)	**Víctor Arano** (1–0)	Wei-Yin Chen (0–1)	**José Álvarez** (1)	15,238	9–5
15	April 15	Mets	6–7 (11)	Luis Avilán (1–0)	**Pat Neshek** (0–1)	Edwin Díaz (6)	32,423	9–6
16	April 16	Mets	14–3	**Nick Pivetta** (2–1)	Steven Matz (1–1)	**Jerad Eickhoff** (1)	43,933	10–6
17	April 17	Mets	3–2	**Jake Arrieta** (3–1)	Zack Wheeler (1–2)	**Héctor Neris** (2)	39,861	11–6
18	April 18	@ Rockies	2–6	Kyle Freeland (2–3)	**Zach Eflin** (2–2)	—	27,562	11–7
19	April 19	@ Rockies	3–4 (12)	Chad Bettis (1–2)	**Juan Nicasio** (0–1)	—	35,423	11–8
20	April 20	@ Rockies	8–5	**Aaron Nola** (2–0)	Antonio Senzatela (1–1)	**Héctor Neris** (3)	40,530	12–8
21	April 21	@ Rockies	1–4	Jon Gray (2–3)	**Jerad Eickhoff** (0–1)	—	28,287	12–9
22	April 22	@ Mets	1–5	Steven Matz (2–1)	**Jake Arrieta** (3–2)	—	25,293	12–10
23	April 23	@ Mets	0–9	Zack Wheeler (2–2)	**Zach Eflin** (2–3)	—	26,049	12–11
24	April 24	@ Mets	6–0	**Vince Velasquez** (1–0)	Jason Vargas (1–1)	—	27,685	13–11
25	April 25	Marlins	1–3 (10)	Tayron Guerrero (1–0)	**Héctor Neris** (0–1)	Sergio Romo (4)	32,060	13–12
26	April 26	Marlins	4–0	**Jerad Eickhoff** (1–1)	José Ureña (1–4)	—	31,159	14–12
27	April 27	Marlins	12–9	**Jake Arrieta** (4–2)	Trevor Richards (0–4)	**Héctor Neris** (4)	37,868	15–12
28	April 28	Marlins	5–1	**Zach Eflin** (3–3)	Pablo López (2–4)	—	39,168	16–12
29	April 30	Tigers	1–3	Spencer Turnbull (2–2)	**Vince Velasquez** (1–1)	Shane Greene (12)	31,759	16–13

May (17–11)

#	Date	Opponent	Score	Win	Loss	Save	Attendance	Record
30	May 1	Tigers	7–3	**Seranthony Domínguez** (2–0)	Buck Farmer (1–2)	—	28,103	17–13
31	May 3	Nationals	4–2	**Seranthony Domínguez** (3–0)	Dan Jennings (0–1)	**Héctor Neris** (5)	33,125	18–13
32	May 4	Nationals	8–10	Tony Sipp (1–1)	**Adam Morgan** (1–1)	Sean Doolittle (5)	43,319	18–14
33	May 5	Nationals	7–1	**Zach Eflin** (4–3)	Aníbal Sánchez (0–5)	—	40,497	19–14
34	May 6	@ Cardinals	0–6	Miles Mikolas (4–2)	**Vince Velasquez** (1–2)	—	38,419	19–15
35	May 7	@ Cardinals	11–1	**Aaron Nola** (3–0)	Dakota Hudson (2–3)	—	38,562	20–15
36	May 8	@ Cardinals	5–0	**Jerad Eickhoff** (2–1)	Jack Flaherty (3–3)	—	42,309	21–15
37	May 10	@ Royals	1–5	Homer Bailey (4–3)	**Jake Arrieta** (4–3)	—	20,015	21–16
38	May 11	@ Royals	7–0	**Zach Eflin** (5–3)	Brad Keller (2–4)	—	24,463	22–16
39	May 12	@ Royals	6–1	**Cole Irvin** (1–0)	Jakob Junis (3–4)	—	19,640	23–16
40	May 13	Brewers	7–4	**Adam Morgan** (2–1)	Matt Albers (2–2)	**Pat Neshek** (2)	26,169	24–16
41	May 14	Brewers	1–6	Brandon Woodruff (6–1)	**Jerad Eickhoff** (2–2)	—	31,533	24–17
42	May 15	Brewers	2–5	Gio González (2–0)	**Jake Arrieta** (4–4)	Josh Hader (11)	28,129	24–18
43	May 16	Brewers	3–11	Zach Davies (5–0)	**Zach Eflin** (5–4)	—	38,346	24–19
44	May 17	Rockies	5–4	**Cole Irvin** (2–0)	Jon Gray (3–4)	**Héctor Neris** (6)	28,079	25–19
45	May 18	Rockies	2–1	**Aaron Nola** (4–0)	Antonio Senzatela (3–3)	**Héctor Neris** (7)	42,354	26–19
46	May 19	Rockies	7–5	**Édgar García** (1–0)	Bryan Shaw (2–1)	**Pat Neshek** (3)	38,603	27–19
47	May 20	@ Cubs	5–4 (10)	**Héctor Neris** (1–1)	Kyle Ryan (0–1)	**Juan Nicasio** (1)	37,909	28–19
48	May 21	@ Cubs	2–3	Kyle Ryan (1–1)	**Juan Nicasio** (0–2)	—	36,768	28–20
49	May 22	@ Cubs	4–8	Tyler Chatwood (3–0)	**Cole Irvin** (2–1)	—	39,246	28–21
50	May 23	@ Cubs	9–7	**Aaron Nola** (5–0)	Jon Lester (3–3)	**Héctor Neris** (8)	37,173	29–21
51	May 24	@ Brewers	6–4	**Vince Velasquez** (2–2)	Freddy Peralta (2–2)	**Héctor Neris** (9)	40,254	30–21
52	May 25	@ Brewers	7–2	**Jake Arrieta** (5–4)	Jhoulys Chacín (3–6)	—	42,475	31–21
53	May 26	@ Brewers	1–9	Brandon Woodruff (7–1)	**Zach Eflin** (5–5)	—	44,174	31–22
54	May 28	Cardinals	4–3	**Nick Pivetta** (3–1)	Adam Wainwright (4–5)	**Héctor Neris** (10)	29,084	32–22
55	May 29	Cardinals	11–4	**Aaron Nola** (6–0)	Génesis Cabrera (0–1)	—	30,486	33–22
56	May 30	Cardinals	3–5	Dakota Hudson (4–3)	**Jerad Eickhoff** (2–3)	Jordan Hicks (11)	31,206	33–23
57	May 31	@ Dodgers	3–6	Kenta Maeda (7–2)	**Jake Arrieta** (5–5)	Kenley Jansen (17)	54,307	33–24

June (11–16)

#	Date	Opponent	Score	Win	Loss	Save	Attendance	Record
58	June 1	@ Dodgers	3–4	Julio Urías (3–2)	**Héctor Neris** (1–2)	—	53,507	33–25
59	June 2	@ Dodgers	0–8	Rich Hill (2–1)	**Vince Velasquez** (2–3)	—	49,162	33–26
60	June 3	@ Padres	2–8	Eric Lauer (5–4)	**Aaron Nola** (6–1)	—	21,654	33–27
61	June 4	@ Padres	9–6	**Jerad Eickhoff** (3–3)	Chris Paddack (4–4)	**Héctor Neris** (11)	25,821	34–27
62	June 5	@ Padres	7–5	**Juan Nicasio** (1–2)	Craig Stammen (4–2)	**Héctor Neris** (12)	23,004	35–27
63	June 7	Reds	4–2	**Zach Eflin** (6–5)	Tyler Mahle (2–6)	**Héctor Neris** (13)	32,058	36–27
64	June 8	Reds	4–1	**Nick Pivetta** (4–1)	Tanner Roark (4–5)	—	44,357	37–27
65	June 9	Reds	3–4	Zach Duke (3–1)	**José Álvarez** (0–2)	Raisel Iglesias (13)	42,324	37–28
66	June 10	Diamondbacks	8–13	Zack Godley (3–4)	**Jerad Eickhoff** (3–4)	—	26,255	37–29
67	June 11	Diamondbacks	7–4	**Jake Arrieta** (6–5)	Jon Duplantier (1–1)	**Héctor Neris** (14)	26,321	38–29
68	June 12	Diamondbacks	0–2	Merrill Kelly (7–6)	**Zach Eflin** (6–6)	Greg Holland (10)	29,047	38–30
69	June 14	@ Braves	8–9	Jerry Blevins (1–0)	**Héctor Neris** (1–3)	—	41,975	38–31
70	June 15	@ Braves	6–5	**Edubray Ramos** (1–0)	Luke Jackson (3–2)	**Héctor Neris** (15)	43,593	39–31
71	June 16	@ Braves	1–15	Mike Foltynewicz (2–5)	**Vince Velasquez** (2–4)	—	40,855	39–32
—	June 17	@ Nationals	Postponed (rain); Makeup: June 19 as a day-night doubleheader					
—	June 18	@ Nationals	Postponed (rain); Makeup: September 24 as a day-night doubleheader					
72	June 19 (1)	@ Nationals	2–6	Patrick Corbin (6–5)	**Zach Eflin** (6–7)	—	17,961	39–33
73	June 19 (2)	@ Nationals	0–2	Max Scherzer (6–5)	**Jake Arrieta** (6–6)	Sean Doolittle (15)	24,220	39–34
74	June 20	@ Nationals	4–7	Javy Guerra (1–0)	**Nick Pivetta** (4–2)	Sean Doolittle (16)	31,329	39–35
75	June 21	Marlins	1–2	Sandy Alcántara (4–6)	**Aaron Nola** (6–2)	Sergio Romo (14)	44,420	39–36
76	June 22	Marlins	3–5	Austin Brice (1–0)	**Adam Morgan** (2–2)	José Quijada (1)	44,722	39–37
77	June 23	Marlins	4–6	Jordan Yamamoto (3–0)	**Enyel De Los Santos** (0–1)	Nick Anderson (1)	36,749	39–38
78	June 24	Mets	13–7	**Zach Eflin** (7–7)	Steven Matz (5–6)	—	29,117	40–38
79	June 25	Mets	7–5	**Jake Arrieta** (7–6)	Wilmer Font (1–2)	**Héctor Neris** (16)	28,125	41–38
80	June 26	Mets	5–4 (10)	**Édgar García** (2–0)	Stephen Nogosek (0–1)	—	29,822	42–38
81	June 27	Mets	6–3	**JD Hammer** (1–0)	Edwin Díaz (1–5)	—	39,161	43–38
82	June 28	@ Marlins	2–6	Elieser Hernández (1–2)	**Vince Velasquez** (2–5)	—	9,469	43–39
83	June 29	@ Marlins	6–9	Jarlin García (2–0)	**Adam Morgan** (2–3)	Sergio Romo (15)	14,774	43–40
84	June 30	@ Marlins	13–6	**Jake Arrieta** (8–6)	Trevor Richards (3–9)	—	11,742	44–40

July (12–11)

#	Date	Opponent	Score	Win	Loss	Save	Attendance	Record
85	July 2	@ Braves	2–0	**Aaron Nola** (7–2)	Dallas Keuchel (1–2)	**Héctor Neris** (17)	40,180	45–40
86	July 3	@ Braves	2–9	Bryse Wilson (1–0)	**Nick Pivetta** (4–3)	—	40,147	45–41
87	July 4	@ Braves	6–12	A. J. Minter (3–4)	**Zach Eflin** (7–8)	—	40,633	45–42
88	July 5	@ Mets	7–2	**Adam Morgan** (3–3)	Edwin Díaz (1–6)	—	32,546	46–42
89	July 6	@ Mets	5–6	Noah Syndergaard (6–4)	**Jake Arrieta** (8–7)	Edwin Díaz (19)	31,350	46–43
90	July 7	@ Mets	8–3	**Aaron Nola** (8–2)	Zack Wheeler (6–6)	—	34,247	47–43
–	July 9	**2019 Major League Baseball All-Star Game at Progressive Field in Cleveland**						
91	July 12	Nationals	0–4	Stephen Strasburg (11–4)	**Nick Pivetta** (4–4)	—	42,318	47–44
92	July 13	Nationals	3–4	Wander Suero (2–4)	**Héctor Neris** (1–4)	Sean Doolittle (20)	43,732	47–45
93	July 14	Nationals	4–3	**Héctor Neris** (2–4)	Matt Grace (0–2)	—	43,075	48–45
94	July 15	Dodgers	2–16	Clayton Kershaw (8–2)	**Zach Eflin** (7–9)	—	30,025	48–46
95	July 16	Dodgers	9–8	**Ranger Suárez** (1–0)	Kenley Jansen (3–3)	—	31,076	49–46
96	July 17	Dodgers	2–7	Pedro Báez (4–2)	**Juan Nicasio** (1–3)	—	31,067	49–47
97	July 18	Dodgers	7–6	**Ranger Suárez** (2–0)	Dylan Floro (4–3)	**Héctor Neris** (18)	38,043	50–47
98	July 19	@ Pirates	6–1	**Juan Nicasio** (2–3)	Richard Rodríguez (3–4)	**Cole Irvin** (1)	34,117	51–47
99	July 20	@ Pirates	1–5	Joe Musgrove (7–8)	**Zach Eflin** (7–10)	—	38,380	51–48
100	July 21	@ Pirates	2–1 (11)	**Ranger Suárez** (3–0)	Chris Stratton (1–3)	—	24,830	52–48
101	July 23	@ Tigers	3–2 (15)	**José Álvarez** (1–2)	Daniel Stumpf (1–1)	—	23,607	53–48
102	July 24	@ Tigers	4–0	**Vince Velasquez** (3–5)	Jordan Zimmermann (0–8)	—	33,735	54–48
103	July 26	Braves	2–9	Sean Newcomb (4–1)	**Jake Arrieta** (8–8)	—	31,268	54–49
104	July 27	Braves	7–15	Max Fried (11–4)	**Zach Eflin** (7–11)	—	39,340	54–50
105	July 28	Braves	9–4	**Aaron Nola** (9–2)	Kevin Gausman (3–6)	—	37,037	55–50
106	July 30	Giants	4–2	**Drew Smyly** (2–5)	Tyler Beede (3–5)	**Héctor Neris** (19)	32,217	56–50
107	July 31	Giants	1–5	Jeff Samardzija (8–8)	**Vince Velasquez** (3–6)	—	31,313	56–51

August (13–14)

#	Date	Opponent	Score	Win	Loss	Save	Attendance	Record
108	August 1	Giants	10–2	**José Álvarez** (2–2)	Dereck Rodríguez (4–6)	—	28,524	57–51
109	August 2	White Sox	3–4 (15)	Josh Osich (1–0)	**Roman Quinn** (0–1)	—	26,635	57–52
110	August 3	White Sox	3–2	**Aaron Nola** (10–2)	Ross Detwiler (1–2)	**Nick Pivetta** (1)	32,647	58–52
111	August 4	White Sox	5–10	Reynaldo López (6–9)	**Drew Smyly** (2–6)	—	31,562	58–53
112	August 5	@ Diamondbacks	7–3	**Vince Velasquez** (4–6)	Merrill Kelly (7–12)	—	18,319	59–53
113	August 6	@ Diamondbacks	4–8	Andrew Chafin (1–2)	**Ranger Suárez** (3–1)	—	17,446	59–54
114	August 7	@ Diamondbacks	1–6	Zac Gallen (2–3)	**Jason Vargas** (6–6)	—	18,140	59–55
115	August 8	@ Giants	0–5	Madison Bumgarner (7–7)	**Aaron Nola** (10–3)	—	37,667	59–56
116	August 9	@ Giants	9–6	**José Álvarez** (3–2)	Tony Watson (2–1)	**Héctor Neris** (20)	36,275	60–56
117	August 10	@ Giants	1–3	Jeff Samardzija (9–9)	**Vince Velasquez** (4–7)	Will Smith (28)	39,106	60–57
118	August 11	@ Giants	6–9	Will Smith (4–0)	**José Álvarez** (3–3)	—	36,637	60–58
119	August 13	Cubs	4–2	**Blake Parker** (2–2)	Kyle Ryan (3–2)	**Héctor Neris** (21)	26,442	61–58
120	August 14	Cubs	11–1	**Aaron Nola** (11–3)	Cole Hamels (6–4)	—	27,204	62–58
121	August 15	Cubs	7–5	**Ranger Suárez** (4–1)	Pedro Strop (2–5)	—	37,064	63–58
122	August 16	Padres	8–4	**Vince Velasquez** (5–7)	Chris Paddack (7–6)	—	26,084	64–58
123	August 17	Padres	3–5	Dinelson Lamet (2–2)	**Nick Pivetta** (4–5)	Kirby Yates (34)	31,332	64–59
124	August 18	Padres	2–3	Joey Lucchesi (8–7)	**Jared Hughes** (3–5)	Kirby Yates (35)	36,210	64–60
125	August 20	@ Red Sox	3–2	**Aaron Nola** (12–3)	Brian Johnson (1–2)	**Héctor Neris** (22)	37,712	65–60
126	August 21	@ Red Sox	5–2	**Jared Hughes** (4–5)	Rick Porcello (11–10)	**Héctor Neris** (23)	37,077	66–60
127	August 23	@ Marlins	11–19	Tyler Kinley (2–1)	**Nick Pivetta** (4–6)	—	9,065	66–61
128	August 24	@ Marlins	9–3	**Zach Eflin** (8–11)	Jordan Yamamoto (4–5)	—	12,981	67–61
129	August 25	@ Marlins	2–3	Elieser Hernández (3–5)	**Aaron Nola** (12–4)	Ryne Stanek (1)	9,286	67–62
130	August 26	Pirates	6–5 (11)	**Mike Morin** (1–0)	Michael Feliz (2–4)	—	27,932	68–62
131	August 27	Pirates	4–5	Felipe Vázquez (5–1)	**Héctor Neris** (2–5)	—	26,200	68–63
132	August 28	Pirates	12–3	**Vince Velasquez** (6–7)	Mitch Keller (1–3)	—	24,224	69–63
133	August 30	Mets	5–11	Justin Wilson (4–1)	**Mike Morin** (1–1)	—	30,503	69–64
134	August 31	Mets	3–6	Steven Matz (9–8)	**Jason Vargas** (6–7)	Seth Lugo (4)	40,690	69–65

September (12–16)

#	Date	Opponent	Score	Win	Loss	Save	Attendance	Record
135	September 1	Mets	5–2	**Héctor Neris** (3–5)	Daniel Zamora (0–1)	—	33,492	70–65
136	September 2	@ Reds	7–1	**Drew Smyly** (3–6)	Anthony DeSclafani (9–8)	—	19,631	71–65
137	September 3	@ Reds	6–2	**Nick Vincent** (1–2)	Amir Garrett (4–2)	—	11,452	72–65
138	September 4	@ Reds	5–8	Michael Lorenzen (1–4)	**José Álvarez** (3–4)	Raisel Iglesias (29)	13,448	72–66
139	September 5	@ Reds	3–4 (11)	Matt Bowman (2–0)	**Nick Vincent** (1–3)	—	13,230	72–67
140	September 6	@ Mets	4–5	Edwin Díaz (2–7)	**Mike Morin** (1–2)	—	28,107	72–68
141	September 7	@ Mets	5–0	**Drew Smyly** (4–6)	Marcus Stroman (7–13)	—	28,848	73–68
142	September 8	@ Mets	10–7	**Ranger Suárez** (5–1)	Paul Sewald (0–1)	**Héctor Neris** (24)	30,264	74–68
143	September 9	Braves	2–7	Mike Foltynewicz (6–5)	**Aaron Nola** (12–5)	—	25,071	74–69
144	September 10	Braves	6–5	**Blake Parker** (3–2)	Max Fried (16–5)	**Héctor Neris** (25)	24,220	75–69
145	September 11	Braves	1–3	Dallas Keuchel (8–5)	**Zach Eflin** (8–12)	Mark Melancon (11)	23,243	75–70
146	September 12	Braves	9–5	**Jared Hughes** (5–5)	Julio Teherán (10–9)	—	27,022	76–70
147	September 14	Red Sox	1–2	Matt Barnes (5–4)	**Héctor Neris** (3–6)	Brandon Workman (13)	40,688	76–71
148	September 15	Red Sox	3–6	Rick Porcello (13–12)	**Jason Vargas** (6–8)	Brandon Workman (14)	39,061	76–72
149	September 17	@ Braves	5–4	**Vince Velasquez** (7–7)	Dallas Keuchel (8–6)	**Héctor Neris** (27)	28,843	77–72
150	September 18	@ Braves	4–1	**Zach Eflin** (9–12)	Julio Teherán (10–10)	**Héctor Neris** (28)	27,937	78–72
151	September 19	@ Braves	4–5	Mike Soroka (13–4)	**Aaron Nola** (12–6)	Mark Melancon (12)	33,223	78–73
152	September 20	@ Indians	2–5	Shane Bieber (15–7)	**Drew Smyly** (4–7)	Carlos Carrasco (1)	26,329	78–74
153	September 21	@ Indians	9–4	**Jason Vargas** (7–8)	Óliver Pérez (2–4)	—	32,791	79–74
154	September 22	@ Indians	1–10	Carlos Carrasco (6–7)	**Vince Velasquez** (7–8)	—	25,309	79–75
155	September 23	@ Nationals	2–7	Patrick Corbin (14–7)	**Zach Eflin** (9–13)	—	19,788	79–76
156	September 24 (1)	@ Nationals	1–4	Tanner Rainey (2–3)	**Nick Vincent** (1–4)	Daniel Hudson (6)	23,442	79–77
157	September 24 (2)	@ Nationals	5–6	Max Scherzer (11–7)	**Aaron Nola** (12–7)	Daniel Hudson (7)	22,214	79–78
158	September 25	@ Nationals	2–5	Aníbal Sánchez (11–8)	**Mike Morin** (1–3)	Sean Doolittle (29)	22,091	79–79
159	September 26	@ Nationals	3–6	Stephen Strasburg (18–6)	**Jason Vargas** (7–9)	Daniel Hudson (8)	22,253	79–80
160	September 27	Marlins	5–4 (15)	**Ranger Suárez** (6–1)	Adam Conley (2–11)	—	24,143	80–80
161	September 28	Marlins	9–3	**Zach Eflin** (10–13)	Caleb Smith (10–11)	—	25,156	81–80
162	September 29	Marlins	3–4	Sandy Alcántara (6–14)	**Blake Parker** (3–3)	Tyler Kinley (1)	31,805	81–81

== Roster ==
All players who made an appearance for the Phillies during 2019 are included.

2019 Philadelphia Phillies
Roster
Pitchers: 52 José Álvarez; 63 Drew Anderson; 64 Víctor Arano; 49 Jake Arrieta; 54 Austin Davis; 51 Enyel De Los Santos; 58 Seranthony Domínguez; 56 Zach Eflin; 48 Jerad Eickhoff; 66,41 Édgar Garcia; 65 JD Hammer; 25 Jared Hughes; 96 Tommy Hunter; 47 Cole Irvin; 46 Adam Morgan; 28 Mike Morin; 50 Héctor Neris; 93 Pat Neshek; 12 Juan Nicasio; 27 Aaron Nola; 53 Blake Parker; 43 Nick Pivetta; 61 Edubray Ramos; 53 Yacksel Ríos; 30 David Robertson; 31 Fernando Salas; 18 Drew Smyly; 55 Ranger Suárez; 44 Jason Vargas; 21 Vince Velasquez; 29 Nick Vincent	Catchers: 73 Deivy Grullón; 15 Andrew Knapp; 10 J. T. Realmuto; Infielders: 7 Maikel Franco; 16 César Hernández; 17 Rhys Hoskins; 33 Brad Miller; 8 Logan Morrison; 13 Sean Rodriguez; 2 Jean Segura	Outfielders: 23 Aaron Altherr; 23 Jay Bruce; 31 Corey Dickerson; 9 Phil Gosselin; 40 Adam Haseley; 3 Bryce Harper; 37 Odúbel Herrera; 4 Scott Kingery; 22 Andrew McCutchen; 67 José Pirela; 24 Roman Quinn; 5 Nick Williams; Other batters: 44 Rob Brantly; 25 Dylan Cozens; 29 Mitch Walding	Manager: 22 Gabe Kapler; Coaches: 39 Bobby Dickerson (infield coach); 81 Craig Driver (bullpen catcher); 38 Paco Figueroa (first base coach); 35 Jim Gott (bullpen); 60 Pedro Guerrero (assistant hitting); 57 David Lundquist (assistant pitching); 41 Charlie Manuel (hitting); 82 Bob Stumpo (bullpen catcher); 59 Rob Thomson (bench); 62 Dusty Wathan (third base); 45 Chris Young (pitching)

== Player stats ==
=== Batting ===
Note: G = Games played; AB = At bats; R = Runs; H = Hits; 2B = Doubles; 3B = Triples; HR = Home runs; RBI = Runs batted in; SB = Stolen bases; BB = Walks; AVG = Batting average; SLG = Slugging average

Player	G	AB	R	H	2B	3B	HR	RBI	SB	BB	AVG	SLG
César Hernández	161	612	77	171	31	3	14	71	9	45	.279	.408
Jean Segura	144	576	79	161	37	4	12	60	10	30	.280	.420
Bryce Harper	157	573	98	149	36	1	35	114	15	99	.260	.510
Rhys Hoskins	160	570	86	129	33	5	29	85	2	116	.226	.454
J. T. Realmuto	145	538	92	148	36	3	25	83	9	41	.275	.493
Scott Kingery	126	458	64	118	34	4	19	55	15	34	.258	.474
Maikel Franco	123	389	48	91	17	0	17	56	0	36	.234	.409
Adam Haseley	67	222	30	59	14	0	5	26	4	14	.266	.396
Andrew McCutchen	59	219	45	56	12	1	10	29	2	43	.256	.457
Jay Bruce	51	145	16	32	6	0	12	31	0	3	.221	.510
Andrew Knapp	74	136	12	29	9	0	2	8	0	18	.213	.324
Corey Dickerson	34	133	13	39	10	2	8	34	0	3	.293	.579
Odúbel Herrera	39	126	12	28	10	1	1	16	2	11	.222	.341
Brad Miller	66	118	22	31	3	1	12	21	1	11	.263	.610
Sean Rodriguez	76	112	24	25	5	0	4	12	1	19	.223	.375
Roman Quinn	44	108	18	23	3	1	4	11	8	12	.213	.370
Nick Williams	67	106	9	16	4	0	2	5	0	4	.151	.245
Phil Gosselin	44	65	5	17	3	0	0	7	0	3	.262	.308
Logan Morrison	29	35	5	7	1	0	2	3	0	3	.200	.400
Aaron Altherr	22	29	2	1	1	0	0	1	0	1	.034	.069
José Pirela	12	17	1	4	1	0	1	2	0	2	.235	.471
Deivy Grullón	4	9	0	1	1	0	0	1	0	0	.111	.222
Mitch Walding	2	2	0	0	0	0	0	0	0	0	.000	.000
Dylan Cozens	1	1	0	0	0	0	0	0	0	0	.000	.000
Rob Brantly	1	1	0	0	0	0	0	0	0	0	.000	.000
Pitcher totals	162	271	16	34	4	0	1	11	0	14	.125	.151
Team totals	162	5571	774	1369	311	26	215	742	78	562	.246	.427

=== Pitching ===
Note: W = Wins; L = Losses; ERA = Earned run average; G = Games pitched; GS = Games started; SV = Saves; IP = Innings pitched; H = Hits allowed; R = Runs allowed; ER = Earned runs allowed; BB = Walks allowed; SO = Strikeouts

Player	W	L	ERA	G	GS	SV	IP	H	R	ER	BB	SO
Aaron Nola	12	7	3.87	34	34	0	202.1	176	91	87	80	229
Zach Eflin	10	13	4.13	32	28	0	163.1	172	88	75	48	129
Jake Arrieta	8	8	4.64	24	24	0	135.2	149	76	70	51	110
Vince Velasquez	7	8	4.91	33	23	0	117.1	120	69	64	43	130
Nick Pivetta	4	6	5.38	30	13	1	93.2	103	64	56	39	89
Héctor Neris	3	6	2.93	68	0	28	67.2	45	24	22	24	89
Drew Smyly	3	2	4.45	12	12	0	62.2	62	34	31	21	68
José Álvarez	3	4	3.36	67	1	1	59.0	66	25	22	18	51
Jerad Eickhoff	3	4	5.71	12	10	1	58.1	58	37	37	18	51
Jason Vargas	1	4	5.37	11	11	0	55.1	60	39	33	24	43
Ranger Suárez	6	1	3.14	37	0	0	48.2	52	18	17	12	42
Juan Nicasio	2	3	4.75	47	0	1	47.1	57	27	25	21	45
Cole Irvin	2	1	5.83	16	3	1	41.2	45	28	27	13	31
Édgar García	2	0	5.77	37	0	0	39.0	38	35	25	26	45
Adam Morgan	3	3	3.94	40	0	0	29.2	20	14	13	10	29
Mike Morin	1	3	5.79	29	0	0	28.0	26	18	18	8	15
Blake Parker	2	1	5.04	23	2	0	25.0	19	14	14	6	31
Seranthony Domínguez	3	0	4.01	27	0	0	24.2	24	13	11	12	29
Jared Hughes	2	1	3.91	25	0	0	23.0	16	10	10	8	20
Austin Davis	0	0	6.53	14	0	0	20.2	22	15	15	14	24
J. D. Hammer	1	0	3.79	20	0	0	19.0	15	8	8	12	13
Pat Neshek	0	1	5.00	20	0	3	18.0	23	11	10	2	9
Edubray Ramos	1	0	5.40	20	0	0	15.0	19	10	9	7	11
Nick Vincent	1	2	1.93	14	0	0	14.0	11	3	3	4	17
Enyel De Los Santos	0	1	7.36	5	1	0	11.0	13	9	9	5	9
David Robertson	0	1	5.40	7	0	0	6.2	8	4	4	6	6
Drew Anderson	0	0	7.50	2	0	0	6.0	6	5	5	6	6
Tommy Hunter	0	0	0.00	5	0	0	5.1	2	0	0	0	5
Victor Arano	1	0	3.86	3	0	0	4.2	2	2	2	2	7
Roman Quinn	0	1	8.10	2	0	0	3.1	7	3	3	3	1
Fernando Salas	0	0	6.75	3	0	0	2.2	8	2	2	0	3
Yacksel Ríos	0	0	13.50	4	0	0	2.2	6	7	4	3	2
Sean Rodriguez	0	0	0.00	2	0	0	1.1	0	0	0	0	1
Aaron Altherr	0	0	9.00	1	0	0	1.0	2	1	1	0	2
Team Total	81	81	4.53	162	162	36	1453.2	1452	794	731	546	1392

== Farm system ==
Level	Team	League	Manager
AAA	Lehigh Valley IronPigs	International League	Gary Jones
AA	Reading Fightin Phils	Eastern League	Greg Legg
A-Advanced	Clearwater Threshers	Florida State League	Shawn Williams
A	Lakewood BlueClaws	South Atlantic League	Marty Malloy
A-Short Season	Williamsport Crosscutters	New York–Penn League	Pat Borders
Rookie	GCL Phillies	Gulf Coast League	Roly de Armas
Rookie	DSL Phillies	Dominican Summer League	Waner Santana
