= 2019 Milwaukee Brewers season =

2019 Milwaukee Brewers
- National League Wild Card winners
- League: National League
- Division: Central
- Ballpark: Miller Park
- City: Milwaukee, Wisconsin
- Record: 89–73 (.549)
- Divisional place: 2nd
- Owners: Mark Attanasio
- General managers: David Stearns
- Managers: Craig Counsell
- Television: Fox Sports Wisconsin (Brian Anderson, Bill Schroeder, Craig Coshun, Matt Lepay); Telemundo Wisconsin (Spanish-language coverage, Sunday home games; Hector Molina, Kevin Holden)
- Radio: 620 WTMJ (Bob Uecker, Jeff Levering, Lane Grindle)
- Stats: ESPN.com; Baseball Reference

The 2019 Milwaukee Brewers season was the 50th season for the Brewers in Milwaukee, the 22nd in the National League, and 51st overall. On September 25, the Brewers clinched a playoff spot in back-to-back seasons for the first time since 1982. They were defeated by the eventual World Series champions Washington Nationals in the NLWC Game.

== Season standings ==
=== National League Central ===
NL Central
Team	W	L	Pct.	GB	Home	Road
St. Louis Cardinals	91	71	.562	—	50‍–‍31	41‍–‍40
Milwaukee Brewers	89	73	.549	2	49‍–‍32	40‍–‍41
Chicago Cubs	84	78	.519	7	51‍–‍30	33‍–‍48
Cincinnati Reds	75	87	.463	16	41‍–‍40	34‍–‍47
Pittsburgh Pirates	69	93	.426	22	35‍–‍46	34‍–‍47

=== National League Wild Card ===
Division leaders
Team	W	L	Pct.
Los Angeles Dodgers	106	56	.654
Atlanta Braves	97	65	.599
St. Louis Cardinals	91	71	.562

Wild Card teams (Top 2 teams qualify for postseason)
Team	W	L	Pct.	GB
Washington Nationals	93	69	.574	+4
Milwaukee Brewers	89	73	.549	—
New York Mets	86	76	.531	3
Arizona Diamondbacks	85	77	.525	4
Chicago Cubs	84	78	.519	5
Philadelphia Phillies	81	81	.500	8
San Francisco Giants	77	85	.475	12
Cincinnati Reds	75	87	.463	14
Colorado Rockies	71	91	.438	18
San Diego Padres	70	92	.432	19
Pittsburgh Pirates	69	93	.426	20
Miami Marlins	57	105	.352	32

=== Record vs. opponents ===
2019 National League record Source: MLB Standings Grid – 2019
Team	AZ	ATL	CHC	CIN	COL	LAD	MIA	MIL	NYM	PHI	PIT	SD	SF	STL	WSH	AL
Arizona	—	4–3	2–4	3–3	9–10	8–11	3–4	2–5	2–5	4–2	6–1	11–8	10–9	3–3	4–3	14–6
Atlanta	3–4	—	5–2	3–4	3–3	2–4	15–4	3–3	11–8	9–10	5–2	5–2	5–2	4–2	11–8	13–7
Chicago	4–2	2–5	—	8–11	3–3	3–4	6–1	9–10	5–2	2–5	11–8	4–3	4–2	9–10	2–4	12–8
Cincinnati	3–3	4–3	11–8	—	3–3	1–5	6–1	8–11	3–4	3–4	7–12	5–2	4–3	7–12	1–5	9–11
Colorado	10–9	3–3	3–3	3–3	—	4–15	5–2	5–2	2–4	3–4	2–5	11–8	7–12	2–5	3–4	8–12
Los Angeles	11–8	4–2	4–3	5–1	15–4	—	5–1	4–3	5–2	5–2	6–0	13–6	12–7	3–4	4–3	10–10
Miami	4–3	4–15	1–6	1–6	2–5	1–5	—	2–5	6–13	10–9	3–3	4–2	3–3	3–4	4–15	9–11
Milwaukee	5–2	3–3	10–9	11–8	2–5	3–4	5–2	—	5–1	4–3	15–4	3–4	2–4	9–10	4–2	8–12
New York	5–2	8–11	2–5	4–3	4–2	2–5	13–6	1–5	—	7–12	5–1	3–3	3–4	2–5	12–7	15–5
Philadelphia	2–4	10–9	5–2	4–3	4–3	2–5	9–10	3–4	12–7	—	4–2	3–3	3–4	4–2	5–14	11–9
Pittsburgh	1–6	2–5	8–11	12–7	5–2	0–6	3–3	4–15	1–5	2–4	—	6–1	5–2	5–14	3–4	12–8
San Diego	8–11	2–5	3–4	2–5	8–11	6–13	2–4	4–3	3–3	3–3	1–6	—	9–10	4–2	4–3	11–9
San Francisco	9–10	2–5	2–4	3–4	12–7	7–12	3–3	4–2	4–3	4–3	2–5	10–9	—	3–4	1–5	11–9
St. Louis	3–3	2–4	10–9	12–7	5–2	4–3	4–3	10–9	5–2	2–4	14–5	2–4	4–3	—	5–2	9–11
Washington	3–4	8–11	4–2	5–1	4–3	3–4	15–4	2–4	7–12	14–5	4–3	3–4	5–1	2–5	—	14–6

== Roster ==
2019 Milwaukee Brewers
Roster
Pitchers: 43 Matt Albers; 57 Chase Anderson; 50 Jacob Barnes; 50 Ray Black; 39 Corbin Burnes; 45 Jhoulys Chacín; 58 Alex Claudio; 27 Zach Davies; 36 Jake Faria; 47 Gio González; 36 Deolis Guerra; 41 Junior Guerra; 71 Josh Hader; 38 Donnie Hart; 37 Adrian Houser; 25 Jay Jackson; 32 Jeremy Jeffress; 23 Jordan Lyles; 52 Jimmy Nelson; 51 Freddy Peralta; 36 Jake Petricka; 15 Drew Pomeranz; 29 Burch Smith; 35 Brent Suter; 56 Aaron Wilkerson; 38 Devin Williams; 54 Taylor Williams; 12 Alex Wilson; 53 Brandon Woodruff	Catchers: 10 Yasmani Grandal; 26 Jacob Nottingham; 9 Manny Piña; Infielders: 24 Jesús Aguilar; 3 Orlando Arcia; 29 Tyler Austin; 2 Mauricio Dubon; 18 Keston Hiura; 11 Mike Moustakas; 14 Hernán Pérez; 13 Tyler Saladino; 21 Travis Shaw; 5 Cory Spangenberg; 7 Eric Thames	Outfielders: 8 Ryan Braun; 6 Lorenzo Cain; 16 Ben Gamel; 2 Trent Grisham; 12 Tyrone Taylor; 22 Christian Yelich; Other batters: 20 David Freitas	Manager: 30 Craig Counsell; Coaches: 63 Robinzon Díaz (bullpen catcher); 49 Andy Haines (hitting); 55 Marcus Hanel (bullpen catcher); 48 Chris Hook (pitching); 33 Steve Karsay (bullpen); 40 Jason Lane (assistant hitting); 59 Pat Murphy (bench/catching); 0 Ed Sedar (third base/outfield); 31 Carlos Subero (first base/infield)

== Game log ==
=== Regular season ===
2019 regular season game log: 89–73 (Home: 49–32; Away: 40–41)
March: 3–1 (Home: 3–1; Away: 0–0)

#	Date	Opponent	Score	Win	Loss	Save	Attendance	Record	Box/ Streak
1	March 28	Cardinals	5–4	**Chacín** (1–0)	Mikolas (0–1)	**Hader** (1)	45,304	1–0	W1
2	March 29	Cardinals	5–9	Gant (1–0)	**Williams** (0–1)	—	30,157	1–1	L1
3	March 30	Cardinals	4–2	**Woodruff** (1–0)	Hudson (0–1)	**Hader** (2)	36,655	2–1	W1
4	March 31	Cardinals	5–4	**Barnes** (1–0)	Hicks (0–1)	—	35,042	3–1	W2

April: 14–13 (Home: 7–5; Away: 7–8)

#	Date	Opponent	Score	Win	Loss	Save	Attendance	Record	Box/ Streak
5	April 1	@ Reds	4–3	**Wilson** (1–0)	Iglesias (0–1)	**Hader** (3)	7,799	4–1	W3
6	April 2	@ Reds	4–3	**Chacín** (2–0)	Duke (1–1)	**Hader** (4)	10,195	5–1	W4
7	April 3	@ Reds	1–0	**Peralta** (1–0)	Castillo (0–1)	**Wilson** (1)	13,439	6–1	W5
8	April 5	Cubs	13–10	**Anderson** (1–0)	Quintana (0–1)	—	34,926	7–1	W6
9	April 6	Cubs	8–14	Hamels (1–0)	**Burnes** (0–1)	—	42,790	7–2	L1
10	April 7	Cubs	4–2	**Davies** (1–0)	Hendricks (0–2)	**Hader** (5)	40,322	8–2	W1
11	April 8	@ Angels	2–5	Cahill (1–1)	**Chacín** (2–1)	Allen (2)	28,571	8–3	L1
12	April 9	@ Angels	8–11	Bedrosian (1–0)	**Claudio** (0–1)	Allen (3)	28,793	8–4	L2
13	April 10	@ Angels	2–4	Barría (1–0)	**Woodruff** (1–1)	Robles (1)	34,446	8–5	L3
14	April 12	@ Dodgers	8–5	**Albers** (1–0)	Urías (0–1)	—	43,643	9–5	W1
15	April 13	@ Dodgers	4–1	**Davies** (2–0)	Ferguson (0–1)	**Guerra** (1)	53,922	10–5	W2
16	April 14	@ Dodgers	1–7	Stripling (1–1)	**Chacín** (2–2)	—	45,235	10–6	L1
17	April 15	Cardinals	10–7	**Guerra** (1–0)	Mayers (0–1)	—	28,199	11–6	W1
18	April 16	Cardinals	8–4	**Woodruff** (2–1)	Flaherty (1–1)	—	30,260	12–6	W1
19	April 17	Cardinals	3–6	Wacha (1–0)	**Burnes** (0–2)	Hicks (4)	29,817	12–7	L1
20	April 18	Dodgers	1–3	Urías (1–1)	**Albers** (1–1)	Jansen (6)	33,281	12–8	L2
21	April 19	Dodgers	3–5	Báez (1–1)	**Hader** (0–1)	Jansen (7)	36,776	12–9	L3
22	April 20	Dodgers	5–0	**Anderson** (2–0)	Ryu (2–1)	—	40,402	13–9	W1
23	April 21	Dodgers	5–6	Jansen (2–0)	**Hader** (0–2)	—	32,054	13–10	L1
24	April 22	@ Cardinals	5–13	Flaherty (2–1)	**Houser** (0–1)	—	35,819	13–11	L2
25	April 23	@ Cardinals	3–4	Miller (1–1)	**Wilson** (1–1)	Hicks (6)	38,474	13–12	L3
26	April 24	@ Cardinals	2–5	Wainwright (2–2)	**Chacín** (2–3)	Hicks (7)	36,878	13–13	L4
27	April 26	@ Mets	10–2	**Albers** (2–1)	deGrom (2–3)	—	28,131	14–13	W1
28	April 27	@ Mets	8–6	**Woodruff** (3–1)	Syndergaard (1–3)	**Hader** (6)	40,610	15–13	W2
29	April 28	@ Mets	2–5	Matz (3–1)	**Barnes** (1–1)	Díaz (8)	25,756	15–14	L1
30	April 29	Rockies	5–1	**Davies** (3–0)	Freeland (2–4)	—	25,356	16–14	W1
31	April 30	Rockies	4–3	**Chacín** (3–3)	Márquez (3–2)	**Hader** (7)	25,673	17–14	W2

May: 15–12 (Home: 8–5; Away: 7–7)

#	Date	Opponent	Score	Win	Loss	Save	Attendance	Record	Box/ Streak
32	May 1	Rockies	4–11	Estévez (1–0)	**Burnes** (0–3)	—	28,780	17–15	L1
33	May 2	Rockies	6–11	Gray (3–3)	**Peralta** (1–1)	—	21,319	17–16	L2
34	May 3	Mets	3–1	**Woodruff** (4–1)	Matz (3–2)	**Hader** (8)	32,550	18–16	W1
35	May 4	Mets	4–3 (18)	**Williams** (1–1)	Flexen (0–2)	—	39,565	19–16	W2
36	May 5	Mets	3–2	**Davies** (4–0)	Vargas (1–2)	**Hader** (9)	36,016	20–16	W3
37	May 6	Nationals	5–3	**Claudio** (1–1)	Jennings (0–2)	**Guerra** (2)	29,299	21–16	W4
38	May 7	Nationals	6–0	**Peralta** (2–1)	Strasburg (3–2)	—	31,023	22–16	W5
39	May 8	Nationals	7–3	**Woodruff** (5–1)	Hellickson (2–1)	**Hader** (10)	30,333	23–16	W6
40	May 10	@ Cubs	7–0	**González** (1–0)	Quintana (4–2)	—	37,870	24–16	W7
41	May 11	@ Cubs	1–2 (15)	Chatwood (2–0)	**Smith** (0–1)	—	39,598	24–17	L1
42	May 12	@ Cubs	1–4	Lester (3–1)	**Chacín** (3–4)	Cishek (2)	37,267	24–18	L2
43	May 13	@ Phillies	4–7	Morgan (2–1)	**Albers** (2–2)	Neshek (2)	26,169	24–19	L3
44	May 14	@ Phillies	6–1	**Woodruff** (6–1)	Eickhoff (2–2)	—	31,533	25–19	W1
45	May 15	@ Phillies	5–2	**González** (2–0)	Arrieta (4–4)	**Hader** (11)	28,129	26–19	W2
46	May 16	@ Phillies	11–3	**Davies** (5–0)	Eflin (5–4)	—	38,346	27–19	W3
47	May 17	@ Braves	8–12	Fried (6–2)	**Chacín** (3–5)	Jackson (6)	36,222	27–20	L1
48	May 18	@ Braves	3–4 (10)	Webb (2–0)	**Hader** (0–3)	—	39,121	27–21	L2
49	May 19	@ Braves	3–2 (10)	**Hader** (1–3)	Parsons (1–2)	—	36,548	28–21	W1
50	May 21	Reds	0–3	Gray (1–4)	**González** (2–1)	Iglesias (10)	36,829	28–22	L1
51	May 22	Reds	11–9	**Guerra** (2–0)	Peralta (0–1)	**Hader** (12)	35,330	29–22	W1
52	May 24	Phillies	4–6	Velasquez (2–2)	**Peralta** (2–2)	Neris (9)	40,254	29–23	L1
53	May 25	Phillies	2–7	Arrieta (5–4)	**Chacín** (3–6)	—	42,475	29–24	L2
54	May 26	Phillies	9–1	**Woodruff** (7–1)	Eflin (5–5)	—	44,174	30–24	W1
55	May 27	@ Twins	5–4	**Burnes** (1–3)	Rogers (1–1)	**Hader** (13)	29,167	31–24	W2
56	May 28	@ Twins	3–5	Magill (1–0)	**Claudio** (1–2)	Harper (1)	27,120	31–25	L1
57	May 30	@ Pirates	11–5	**Anderson** (3–0)	Musgrove (3–6)	—	13,059	32–25	W1
58	May 31	@ Pirates	4–9	Archer (2–5)	**Chacín** (3–7)	—	28,465	32–26	L1

June: 13–13 (Home: 9–7; Away: 4–6)

#	Date	Opponent	Score	Win	Loss	Save	Attendance	Record	Box/ Streak
59	June 1	@ Pirates	12–10 (13)	**Houser** (1–1)	McRae (0–1)	—	28,770	33–26	W1
60	June 2	@ Pirates	4–2	**Davies** (6–0)	Lyles (5–3)	**Burnes** (1)	19,442	34–26	W2
61	June 4	Marlins	0–16	López (4–5)	**Anderson** (3–1)	—	25,364	34–27	L1
62	June 5	Marlins	3–8	Alcántara (3–5)	**Nelson** (0–1)	—	26,615	34–28	L2
63	June 6	Marlins	5–1	**Peralta** (3–2)	Smith (3–4)	**Hader** (14)	25,409	35–28	W1
64	June 7	Pirates	10–4	**Woodruff** (8–1)	Davis (0–1)	—	30,296	36–28	W2
65	June 8	Pirates	5–3	**Davies** (7–0)	Feliz (2–2)	**Hader** (15)	40,704	37–28	W3
66	June 9	Pirates	5–2	**Jeffress** (1–0)	Liriano (1–1)	**Hader** (16)	45,375	38–28	W4
67	June 11	@ Astros	8–10	Peacock (6–3)	**Peralta** (3–3)	—	35,928	38–29	L1
68	June 12	@ Astros	6–3 (14)	**Houser** (2–1)	Pérez (1–1)	—	40,032	39–29	W1
69	June 14	@ Giants	3–5	Pomeranz (2–6)	**Davies** (7–1)	Smith (17)	35,106	39–30	L1
70	June 15	@ Giants	7–8	Gott (3–0)	**Guerra** (2–1)	Smith (18)	34,560	39–31	L2
71	June 16	@ Giants	5–3	**Albers** (3–2)	Samardzija (3–6)	**Hader** (17)	34,603	40–31	W1
72	June 17	@ Padres	0–2	Lucchesi (6–4)	**Chacín** (3–8)	Yates (25)	24,914	40–32	L1
73	June 18	@ Padres	1–4	Allen (1–0)	**Woodruff** (8–2)	Yates (26)	29,112	40–33	L2
74	June 19	@ Padres	7–8	Reyes (4–0)	**Jeffress** (1–1)	Stammen (3)	28,144	40–34	L3
75	June 20	Reds	1–7	Roark (5–6)	**Nelson** (0–2)	—	28,898	40–35	L4
76	June 21	Reds	7–11	Hernandez (2–3)	**Anderson** (3–2)	—	38,289	40–36	L5
77	June 22	Reds	6–5	**Albers** (4–2)	Castillo (7–2)	**Hader** (18)	43,971	41–36	W1
78	June 23	Reds	7–5	**Woodruff** (9–2)	DeSclafani (4–4)	—	41,237	42–36	W2
79	June 25	Mariners	3–8	Gonzales (9–6)	**Davies** (7–2)	—	28,468	42–37	L1
80	June 26	Mariners	2–4	LeBlanc (5–2)	**Houser** (2–2)	Elías (10)	30,074	42–38	L2
81	June 27	Mariners	4–2	**Anderson** (4–2)	Leake (7–7)	**Hader** (19)	36,587	43–38	W1
82	June 28	Pirates	2–3	Vázquez (2–0)	**Jeffress** (1–2)	—	33,931	43–39	L1
83	June 29	Pirates	3–1	**Woodruff** (10–2)	Lyles (5–4)	**Hader** (20)	37,821	44–39	W1
84	June 30	Pirates	2–1	**Jeffress** (2–2)	Crick (3–4)	**Albers** (1)	41,257	45–39	W2

July: 12–13 (Home: 6–6; Away: 6–7)

#	Date	Opponent	Score	Win	Loss	Save	Attendance	Record	Box/ Streak
85	July 1	@ Reds	8–6	**Claudio** (2–2)	Hernandez (2–4)	**Jeffress** (1)	16,186	46–39	W3
86	July 2	@ Reds	4–5 (11)	Iglesias (2–7)	**Burnes** (1–4)	—	15,105	46–40	L1
87	July 3	@ Reds	0–3	Gray (5–5)	**Chacín** (3–9)	Iglesias (15)	22,685	46–41	L2
88	July 4	@ Reds	0–1	Castillo (8–3)	**Woodruff** (10–3)	Iglesias (16)	20,885	46–42	L3
89	July 5	@ Pirates	7–6 (10)	**Guerra** (3–1)	Vázquez (2–1)	—	23,229	47–42	W1
90	July 6	@ Pirates	2–12	Agrazal (2–0)	**Houser** (2–3)	—	28,038	47–43	L1
91	July 7	@ Pirates	5–6	Liriano (3–1)	**Guerra** (3–2)	Vázquez (20)	17,624	47–44	L2
ASG	July 9	NL @ AL	3–4	Tanaka (1–0)	Kershaw (0–1)	Chapman (1)	36,747	—	N/A
92	July 12	Giants	7–10 (10)	Smith (2–0)	**Albers** (4–3)	—	40,186	47–45	L3
93	July 13	Giants	5–4	**Jeffress** (3–2)	Moronta (3–5)	—	42,324	48–45	W1
94	July 14	Giants	3–8	Beede (3–3)	**Burnes** (1–5)	—	43,258	48–46	L1
95	July 15	Braves	2–4	Fried (10–4)	**Houser** (2–4)	Jackson (17)	31,850	48–47	L2
96	July 16	Braves	13–1	**Woodruff** (11–3)	Wilson (1–1)	—	31,599	49–47	W1
97	July 17	Braves	5–4	**Anderson** (5–2)	Keuchel (3–3)	**Hader** (21)	36,928	50–47	W2
98	July 18	@ Diamondbacks	5–1	**Davies** (8–2)	López (1–3)	—	23,985	51–47	W3
99	July 19	@ Diamondbacks	7–10	Bradley (3–4)	**Chacín** (3–10)	Holland (16)	28,505	51–48	L1
100	July 20	@ Diamondbacks	8–3	**Houser** (3–4)	Chafin (0–2)	—	38,567	52–48	W1
101	July 21	@ Diamondbacks	7–4	**Peralta** (4–3)	López (1–4)	**Hader** (22)	33,111	53–48	W2
102	July 22	Reds	5–6	Peralta (1–1)	**Jeffress** (3–3)	Hughes (1)	26,235	53–49	L1
103	July 23	Reds	6–14	Roark (6–6)	**Davies** (8–3)	Romano (1)	33,512	53–50	L2
104	July 24	Reds	5–4	**Albers** (5–3)	Sims (1–1)	**Peralta** (1)	39,682	54–50	W1
105	July 26	Cubs	3–2	**Houser** (4–4)	Kintzler (2–1)	**Hader** (23)	40,566	55–50	W2
106	July 27	Cubs	5–3 (10)	**Peralta** (5–3)	Kimbrel (0–2)	—	43,931	56–50	W3
107	July 28	Cubs	4–11	Brach (4–3)	**Davies** (8–4)	—	43,544	56–51	L1
108	July 30	@ Athletics	2–3 (10)	Treinen (5–3)	**Hader** (1–4)	—	17,291	56–52	L2
109	July 31	@ Athletics	4–2	**Lyles** (6–7)	Anderson (9–7)	**Hader** (24)	14,864	57–52	W1

August: 12–14 (Home: 6–5; Away: 6–9)

#	Date	Opponent	Score	Win	Loss	Save	Attendance	Record	Box/ Streak
110	August 1	@ Athletics	3–5	Treinen (6–3)	**Hader** (1–5)	Hendriks (10)	17,029	57–53	L1
111	August 2	@ Cubs	2–6	Quintana (9–7)	**Davies** (8–5)	—	41,424	57–54	L2
112	August 3	@ Cubs	1–4	Wick (1–0)	**Guerra** (3–3)	Kimbrel (9)	41,186	57–55	L3
113	August 4	@ Cubs	2–7	Darvish (4–5)	**Houser** (4–5)	Chatwood (2)	40,466	57–56	L4
114	August 5	@ Pirates	9–7	**Lyles** (7–7)	Agrazal (2-3)	**Hader** (25)	11,208	58–56	W1
115	August 6	@ Pirates	4–3	**Guerra** (4–3)	Liriano (4–3)	**Albers** (2)	13,969	59–56	W2
116	August 7	@ Pirates	8–3	**Guerra** (5–3)	Williams (4–5)	—	12,885	60–56	W3
117	August 9	Rangers	6–5	**Hader** (2–5)	Clase (0–1)	—	35,294	61–56	W4
118	August 10	Rangers	3–2	**Houser** (5–5)	Payano (1–1)	**Albers** (3)	41,903	62–56	W5
119	August 11	Rangers	0–1	Minor (11–6)	**Lyles** (7–8)	Leclerc (8)	44,411	62–57	L1
120	August 13	Twins	5–7	Duffey (2–1)	**Pomeranz** (2–10)	Romo (19)	44,331	62–58	L2
121	August 14	Twins	6–5	**Guerra** (6–3)	Romo (2–1)	**Albers** (4)	41,077	63–58	W1
122	August 16	@ Nationals	1–2	Strickland (1–1)	**Guerra** (6–4)	Doolittle (28)	30,091	63–59	L1
123	August 17	@ Nationals	15–14 (14)	**Guerra** (7–4)	Guerra (1–1)	—	36,953	64–59	W1
124	August 18	@ Nationals	8–16	Fedde (4–2)	**Anderson** (5–3)	—	30,571	64–60	L1
125	August 19	@ Cardinals	0–3	Hudson (12–6)	**Davies** (8–6)	Miller (5)	44,843	64–61	L2
126	August 20	@ Cardinals	4–9	Webb (1–1)	**Jeffress** (3–4)	—	37,823	64–62	L3
127	August 21	@ Cardinals	5–3 (8)	**Houser** (6–5)	Wainwright (9–9)	**Guerra** (3)	40,250	65–62	W1
128	August 23	Diamondbacks	6–1	**Lyles** (8–8)	Kelly (9–13)	—	42,209	66–62	W2
129	August 24	Diamondbacks	4–0	**Anderson** (6–3)	Gallen (2–4)	—	41,737	67–62	W3
130	August 25	Diamondbacks	2–5	Ray (11–7)	**Davies** (8–7)	Bradley (7)	38,920	67–63	L1
131	August 26	Cardinals	2–12	Gant (9–0)	**González** (2–2)	—	29,475	67–64	L2
132	August 27	Cardinals	3–6	Mikolas (8–13)	**Albers** (5–4)	Martínez (16)	36,690	67–65	L3
133	August 28	Cardinals	4–1	**Lyles** (9–8)	Flaherty (8–7)	**Hader** (26)	33,045	68–65	W1
134	August 30	@ Cubs	1–7	Quintana (12–8)	**Anderson** (6–4)	—	40,276	68–66	L1
135	August 31	@ Cubs	2–0	**Guerra** (8–4)	Hamels (7–5)	**Hader** (27)	40,178	69–66	W1

September: 20–7 (Home: 10–3; Away: 10–4)

#	Date	Opponent	Score	Win	Loss	Save	Attendance	Record	Box/ Streak
136	September 1	@ Cubs	4–0	**Jackson** (1–0)	Chatwood (5–3)	—	40,912	70–66	W2
137	September 2	Astros	2–3 (10)	Osuna (4–3)	**Guerra** (8–5)	James (1)	39,046	70–67	L1
138	September 3	Astros	4–2	**Lyles** (10–8)	Greinke (14–5)	**Hader** (28)	29,335	71–67	W1
139	September 5	Cubs	5–10	Quintana (13–8)	**Albers** (5–5)	—	31,007	71–68	L1
140	September 6	Cubs	7–1	**Davies** (9–7)	Hamels (7–6)	—	38,139	72–68	W1
141	September 7	Cubs	3–2	**Hader** (3–5)	Kintzler (3–3)	—	44,323	73–68	W2
142	September 8	Cubs	8–5	**Suter** (1–0)	Lester (12–10)	**Hader** (29)	44,217	74–68	W3
143	September 9	@ Marlins	8–3	**Albers** (6–5)	Dugger (0–2)	—	6,672	75–68	W4
144	September 10	@ Marlins	4–3	**Guerra** (9–5)	Conley (2–9)	**Pomeranz** (1)	7,215	76–68	W5
145	September 11	@ Marlins	7–5	**Suter** (2–0)	Ureña (4–9)	**Hader** (30)	7,815	77–68	W6
146	September 12	@ Marlins	3–2	**Peralta** (6–3)	Smith (8–10)	**Hader** (31)	7,375	78–68	W7
147	September 13	@ Cardinals	0–10	Wainwright (12–9)	**Houser** (6–6)	—	47,075	78–69	L1
148	September 14	@ Cardinals	5–2	**Lyles** (11–8)	Flaherty (10–8)	**Hader** (32)	46,665	79–69	W1
149	September 15	@ Cardinals	7–6	**Albers** (7–5)	Gant (10–1)	**Hader** (33)	46,722	80–69	W2
150	September 16	Padres	5–1	**Davies** (10–7)	Richards (0–1)	—	33,215	81–69	W3
151	September 17	Padres	3–1	**Albers** (8–5)	Strahm (5–9)	**Pomeranz** (2)	34,565	82–69	W4
152	September 18	Padres	1–2	Lamet (3–5)	**Houser** (6–7)	Yates (41)	38,235	82–70	L1
153	September 19	Padres	5–1	**Peralta** (7–3)	Lucchesi (10–9)	**Hader** (34)	31,687	83–70	W1
154	September 20	Pirates	10–1	**Anderson** (7–4)	Brault (4–6)	—	43,390	84–70	W2
155	September 21	Pirates	10–1	**Suter** (3–0)	Marvel (0–3)	—	42,888	85–70	W3
156	September 22	Pirates	4–3	**González** (3–2)	Williams (7–8)	**Hader** (35)	43,321	86–70	W4
157	September 24	@ Reds	4–2	**Suter** (4–0)	Gray (11–8)	**Hader** (36)	14,778	87–70	W5
158	September 25	@ Reds	9–2	**Lyles** (12–8)	Mahle (2–12)	—	16,530	88–70	W6
159	September 26	@ Reds	5–3	**Anderson** (8–4)	Castillo (15–8)	**Hader** (37)	27,774	89–70	W7
160	September 27	@ Rockies	7–11	Senzatela (11–11)	**Black** (0–1)	—	44,087	89–71	L1
161	September 28	@ Rockies	2–3 (10)	Díaz (6–4)	**Albers** (8–6)	—	47,381	89–72	L2
162	September 29	@ Rockies	3–4 (13)	Shaw (3–2)	**Faria** (0–1)	—	36,771	89–73	L3

Legend: = Win = Loss = Postponement
Bold = Brewers team member

== Player stats ==
=== Batting ===
Note: G = Games played; AB = At bats; R = Runs; H = Hits; 2B = Doubles; 3B = Triples; HR = Home runs; RBI = Runs batted in; SB = Stolen bases; BB = Walks; AVG = Batting average; SLG = Slugging average

Player	G	AB	R	H	2B	3B	HR	RBI	SB	BB	AVG	SLG
Lorenzo Cain	148	562	75	146	30	0	11	48	18	50	.260	.372
Mike Moustakas	143	523	80	133	30	1	35	87	3	53	.254	.516
Yasmani Grandal	153	513	79	126	26	2	28	77	5	109	.246	.468
Orlando Arcia	152	494	51	110	16	1	15	59	8	43	.223	.350
Christian Yelich	130	489	100	161	29	3	44	97	30	80	.329	.671
Ryan Braun	144	459	70	131	31	2	22	75	11	34	.285	.505
Eric Thames	149	396	67	98	23	2	25	61	3	51	.247	.505
Keston Hiura	84	314	51	95	23	2	19	49	9	25	.303	.570
Ben Gamel	134	311	47	77	18	0	7	33	2	40	.248	.373
Hernán Pérez	91	232	29	53	11	0	8	18	5	11	.228	.379
Travis Shaw	86	230	22	36	5	0	7	16	0	36	.157	.270
Jesús Aguilar	94	222	26	50	9	0	8	34	0	31	.225	.374
Manny Piña	76	158	10	36	8	0	7	25	0	16	.228	.411
Trent Grisham	51	156	24	36	6	2	6	24	1	20	.231	.410
Cory Spangenberg	32	95	11	22	2	2	2	10	3	6	.232	.358
Tyler Saladino	28	65	7	8	0	0	2	8	2	5	.123	.215
Tyler Austin	17	20	5	4	2	0	1	4	1	6	.200	.450
David Freitas	16	13	1	1	0	0	0	0	0	3	.077	.077
Tyrone Taylor	15	10	1	4	2	0	0	1	0	1	.400	.600
Jacob Nottingham	9	6	1	2	0	0	1	4	0	0	.333	.333
Mauricio Dubón	2	2	0	0	0	0	0	0	0	0	.000	.000
Pitcher totals	162	272	12	37	8	0	2	14	0	9	.136	.188
Team totals	162	5542	769	1366	279	17	250	744	101	629	.246	.438

=== Pitching ===
Note: W = Wins; L = Losses; ERA = Earned run average; G = Games pitched; GS = Games started; SV = Saves; IP = Innings pitched; H = Hits allowed; R = Runs allowed; ER = Earned runs allowed; BB = Walks allowed; SO = Strikeouts

Player	W	L	ERA	G	GS	SV	IP	H	R	ER	BB	SO
Zach Davies	10	7	3.55	31	31	0	159.2	155	73	63	51	102
Chase Anderson	8	4	4.21	32	27	0	139.0	126	67	65	50	124
Brandon Woodruff	11	3	3.62	22	22	0	121.2	109	49	49	30	143
Adrian Houser	6	7	3.72	35	18	0	111.1	101	49	46	37	117
Jhoulys Chacín	3	10	5.79	19	19	0	88.2	99	61	57	39	80
Gio González	3	2	3.50	19	17	0	87.1	76	36	34	37	78
Freddy Peralta	7	3	5.29	39	8	1	85.0	87	58	50	37	115
Junior Guerra	9	5	3.55	72	0	3	83.2	58	35	33	36	77
Josh Hader	3	5	2.62	61	0	37	75.2	41	24	22	20	138
Alex Claudio	2	2	4.06	83	0	0	62.0	57	29	28	24	44
Matt Albers	8	6	5.13	67	0	4	59.2	53	34	34	29	57
Jordan Lyles	7	1	2.45	11	11	0	58.2	43	19	16	22	56
Jeremy Jeffress	3	4	5.02	48	0	1	52.0	54	32	29	17	46
Corbin Burnes	1	5	8.82	32	4	1	49.0	70	52	48	20	70
Jay Jackson	1	0	4.45	28	0	0	30.1	22	15	15	18	47
Drew Pomeranz	0	1	2.39	25	1	2	26.1	16	7	7	8	45
Jimmy Nelson	0	2	6.95	10	3	0	22.0	25	18	17	17	26
Jacob Barnes	1	1	6.86	18	1	0	19.2	22	17	15	11	22
Brent Suter	4	0	0.49	9	0	0	18.1	10	1	1	1	15
Aaron Wilkerson	0	0	7.31	8	0	0	16.0	25	13	13	9	11
Taylor Williams	1	1	9.82	10	0	0	14.2	22	17	16	7	15
Ray Black	0	1	5.14	15	0	0	14.0	10	8	8	8	13
Devin Williams	0	0	3.95	13	0	0	13.2	18	9	6	6	14
Burch Smith	0	1	7.82	7	0	0	12.2	16	11	11	10	14
Alex Wilson	1	1	9.53	13	0	1	11.1	15	12	12	9	13
Jake Faria	0	1	11.42	9	0	0	8.2	18	12	11	5	8
Jake Petricka	0	0	3.38	6	0	0	8.0	6	3	3	6	3
Donnie Hart	0	0	0.00	4	0	0	6.2	4	0	0	4	3
Hernán Pérez	0	0	3.00	3	0	0	3.0	2	1	1	2	1
Deolis Guerra	0	0	54.00	1	0	0	0.2	4	4	4	0	0
Team totals	89	73	4.40	162	162	50	1459.1	1364	766	713	570	1497

=== Postseason Game Log ===
2019 postseason game log: 0–1 (Home: 0–0; Away: 0–1)
National League Wild Card Game: 0–1

#	Date	Opponent	Score	Win	Loss	Save	Attendance	Record	Streak
1	October 1	@ Nationals	3–4	Strasburg (1–0)	Hader (0–1)	Hudson (1)	42,993	0–1	L1

== Postseason rosters ==
Playoff rosters
National League Wild Card Game

- Pitchers: 15 Drew Pomeranz 23 Jordan Lyles 25 Jay Jackson 35 Brent Suter 41 Junior Guerra 51 Freddy Peralta 53 Brandon Woodruff 57 Chase Anderson 58 Alex Claudio 71 Josh Hader
- Catchers: 9 Manny Piña 10 Yasmani Grandal
- Infielders: 3 Orlando Arcia 5 Cory Spangenberg 7 Eric Thames 11 Mike Moustakas 14 Hernán Pérez 18 Keston Hiura 21 Travis Shaw 29 Tyler Austin
- Outfielders: 2 Trent Grisham 6 Lorenzo Cain 8 Ryan Braun 12 Tyrone Taylor 16 Ben Gamel

== Detailed records ==
National League
Opponent	Home	Away	Total	Pct.	Runs scored	Runs allowed
NL East
Atlanta Braves	2–1	1–2	3–3	.500	34	27
Miami Marlins	1–2	4–0	5–2	.714	30	38
New York Mets	3–0	2–1	5–1	.833	30	19
Philadelphia Phillies	1–2	3–1	4–3	.571	41	27
Washington Nationals	3–0	1–2	4–2	.667	42	38
	10–5	11–6	21–11	.656	177	149
NL Central
Milwaukee Brewers	—	—	—	—	—	—
Chicago Cubs	7–3	3–6	10–9	.526	81	90
Cincinnati Reds	4–5	7–3	11–8	.579	87	92
Pittsburgh Pirates	8–1	7–3	15–4	.789	117	82
St. Louis Cardinals	6–4	3–6	9–10	.474	80	110
	25–13	20–18	45–31	.592	365	374
NL West
Arizona Diamondbacks	2–1	3–1	5–2	.714	39	24
Colorado Rockies	2–2	0–3	2–5	.286	31	44
Los Angeles Dodgers	1–3	2–1	3–4	.429	27	27
San Diego Padres	3–1	0–3	3–4	.429	22	19
San Francisco Giants	1–2	1–2	2–4	.333	30	38
	9–9	6–10	15–19	.441	149	152

American League
Opponent	Home	Away	Total	Pct.	Runs scored	Runs allowed
Houston Astros	1–1	1–1	2–2	.500	20	18
Los Angeles Angels	—	0–3	0–3	.000	12	20
Minnesota Twins	1–1	1–1	2–2	.500	19	21
Oakland Athletics	—	1–2	1–2	.333	9	10
Seattle Mariners	1–2	—	1–2	.333	9	14
Texas Rangers	2–1	—	2–1	.667	9	8
	5–5	3–7	8–12	.400	78	91

== Farm system ==
The Brewers' farm system consisted of nine minor league affiliates in 2019. They operated a Dominican Summer League team as a co-op with the Cleveland Indians.

Level	Team	League	Manager
Triple-A	San Antonio Missions	Pacific Coast League	Rick Sweet
Double-A	Biloxi Shuckers	Southern League	Mike Guerrero
Class A-Advanced	Carolina Mudcats	Carolina League	Joe Ayrault
Class A	Wisconsin Timber Rattlers	Midwest League	Matt Erickson
Rookie	Rocky Mountain Vibes	Pioneer League	Néstor Corredor
Rookie	AZL Brewers Blue	Arizona League	Rafael Neda
Rookie	AZL Brewers Gold	Arizona League	—
Rookie	DSL Brewers	Dominican Summer League	Victor Estevez
Rookie	DSL Indians/Brewers	Dominican Summer League	—
