= Jeff Brigham =

American baseball player (born 1992)

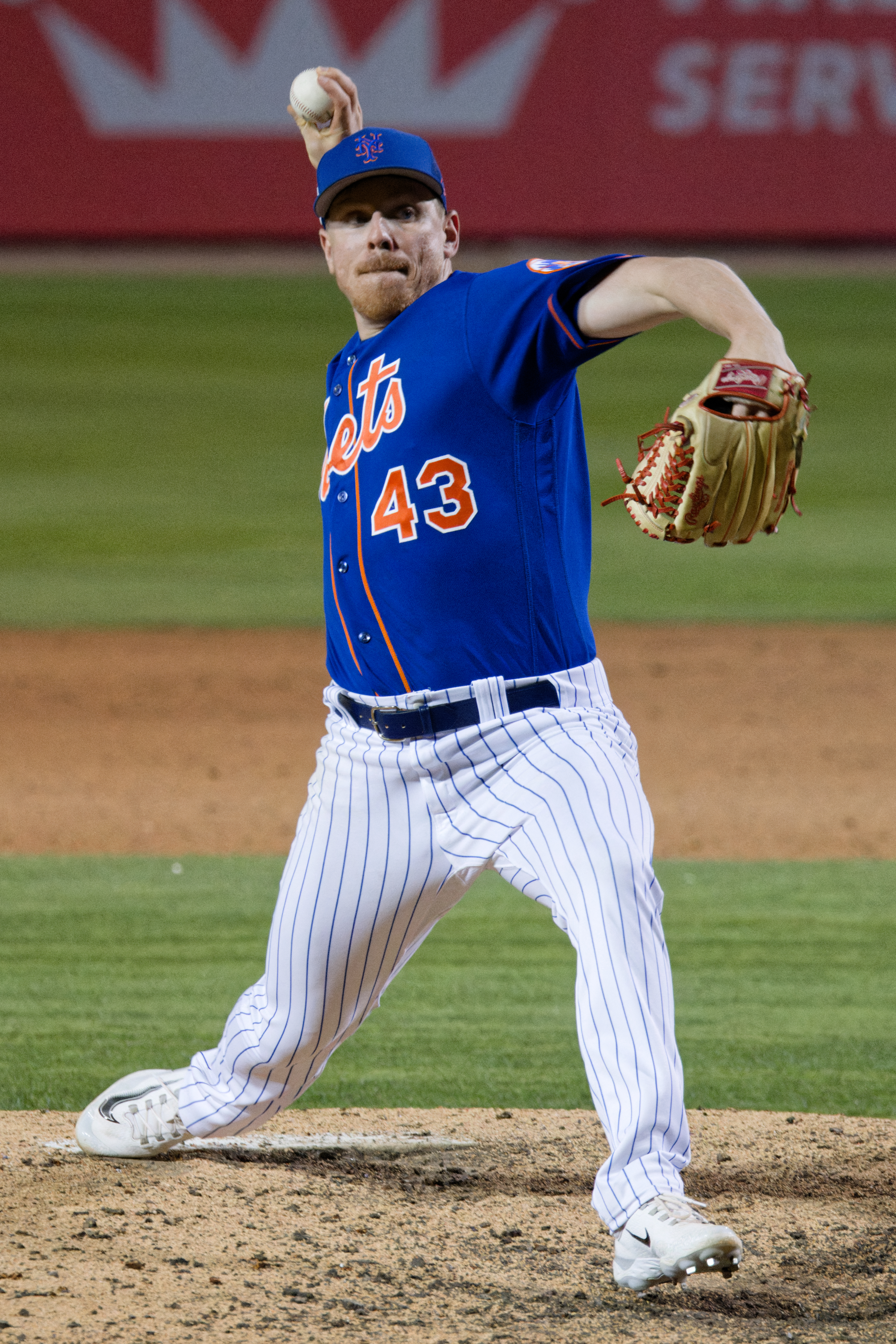
- Brigham with the Mets in 2023

Saraperos de Saltillo – No. 40
- Pitcher
- Born: February 16, 1992 (age 34); Federal Way, Washington, U.S.
- Bats: Right Throws: Right

MLB debut
- September 2, 2018, for the Miami Marlins

MLB statistics (through 2025 season)
- Win–loss record: 4–10
- Earned run average: 4.85
- Strikeouts: 124
- Stats at Baseball Reference

Teams
- Miami Marlins (2018–2020, 2022); New York Mets (2023); Arizona Diamondbacks (2025)

Jeff John Brigham (born February 16, 1992) is an American professional baseball pitcher for the Saraperos de Saltillo of the Mexican League. He has previously played in Major League Baseball (MLB) for the Miami Marlins, New York Mets, and Arizona Diamondbacks. He made his MLB debut in 2018 with the Marlins.

== Career ==
=== Amateur career ===
Brigham attended Thomas Jefferson High School in Auburn, Washington, and the University of Washington, where he played college baseball for the Washington Huskies.

=== Los Angeles Dodgers ===
Brigham was drafted by the Los Angeles Dodgers in the fourth round of the 2014 Major League Baseball draft. He made his professional debut with the Ogden Raptors. He started 2015 with the Great Lakes Loons and Rancho Cucamonga Quakes.

=== Miami Marlins ===
On July 30, 2015, Brigham was acquired by the Miami Marlins as part of a 13-player trade with the Atlanta Braves and Los Angeles Dodgers. He finished the season with the Jupiter Hammerheads. He pitched 2016 with Jupiter and after the season, played in the Arizona Fall League. He pitched 2017 with Jupiter and played 2018 with the Gulf Coast League Marlins, Jacksonville Jumbo Shrimp, and New Orleans Baby Cakes.

Brigham was promoted to the Major Leagues on September 1, 2018. Brigham had an 0–4 record with 12 strikeouts and a 6.06 ERA in 16.1 innings pitched in the 2018 season. In 2019 for Miami, Brigham made 32 appearances for the club, pitching to a 4.46 ERA and 3–2 record with 39 strikeouts in 38 1/3 innings of work. In 2020, Brigham only pitched one inning, allowing a single run on two hits.

On February 17, 2021, Brigham was placed on the 60-day injured list. He did not appear in a game for the Marlins organization in 2021 due to an undisclosed injury. On October 28, Brigham was outrighted off of the 40-man roster.

Brigham was assigned to Triple-A Jacksonville to begin the 2022 season. On July 24, 2022, Brigham's contract was selected by the Marlins and was promoted to the major leagues. In 16 appearances for Miami, Brigham posted a 3.38 ERA with 28 strikeouts in 24 innings pitched. On November 15, Brigham was designated for assignment by the Marlins.

=== New York Mets ===
On November 18, 2022, the Marlins traded Brigham and Elieser Hernández to the New York Mets for Franklin Sanchez and a player to be named later or cash considerations. Jake Mangum went to Miami to complete the trade after he was not selected in the Rule 5 draft. Brigham was optioned to the Triple-A Syracuse Mets to begin the 2023 season. He was non-tendered and became a free agent on November 17.

=== Minnesota Twins ===
On February 13, 2024, Brigham signed a minor league contract with the Minnesota Twins. In 33 appearances for the Triple–A St. Paul Saints, he logged a 1–3 record and 4.64 ERA with 59 strikeouts across 42 2/3 innings pitched. Brigham elected free agency following the season on November 4.

=== Arizona Diamondbacks ===
On December 3, 2024, Brigham signed a minor league contract with the Arizona Diamondbacks. He had his contract selected to the major league roster on May 30, 2025. In four appearances for Arizona, Brigham struggled to an 8.10 ERA with three strikeouts across 3 1/3 innings pitched. Brigham was designated for assignment by the Diamondbacks on August 11. He was released by Arizona the following day.

=== Chicago Cubs ===
On December 25, 2025, Brigham signed a minor league contract with the Chicago Cubs. He was assigned to the Triple-A Iowa Cubs, but did not make an appearance prior to his release on June 9, 2026.

=== Saraperos de Saltillo ===
On July 12, 2026, Brigham signed with the Saraperos de Saltillo of the Mexican League.
