= Elieser Hernández =

Venezuelan baseball player (born 1995)

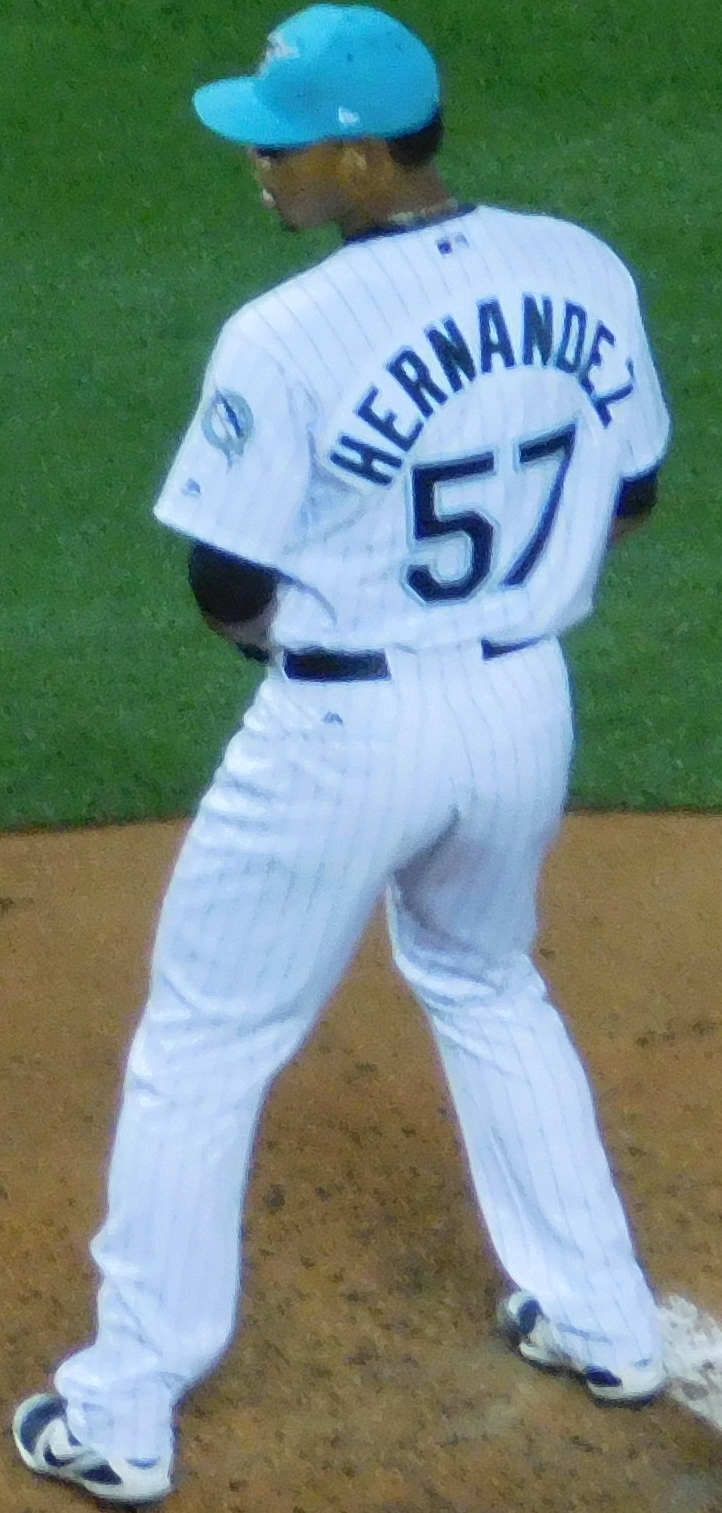
- Hernández with the Miami Marlins in 2018

Free agent
- Pitcher
- Born: May 3, 1995 (age 31); Ocumare del Tuy, Venezuela
- Bats: Right Throws: Right

Professional debut
- MLB: May 11, 2018, for the Miami Marlins
- KBO: August 8, 2024, for the LG Twins

MLB statistics (through 2026 season)
- Win–loss record: 12–22
- Earned run average: 4.99
- Strikeouts: 298

KBO statistics (through 2025 season)
- Win–loss record: 7–6
- Earned run average: 4.14
- Strikeouts: 128
- Stats at Baseball Reference

Teams
- Miami Marlins (2018–2022); Los Angeles Dodgers (2024); Milwaukee Brewers (2024); LG Twins (2024–2025); Atlanta Braves (2026)

Elieser Alexis Hernández (Eh-LEE-eh-ser; born May 3, 1995) is a Venezuelan professional baseball pitcher who is a free agent. He has previously played in Major League Baseball (MLB) for the Miami Marlins, Los Angeles Dodgers, Milwaukee Brewers, and Atlanta Braves and in the KBO League for the LG Twins. Hernández signed with the Houston Astros as an international free agent in 2012 and made his MLB debut with the Marlins in 2018.

== Career ==
=== Houston Astros ===
Hernández signed with the Houston Astros as an international free agent on May 31, 2012. He made his professional debut with the Dominican Summer League Astros. He spent the 2013 season with the DSL Astros as well, logging a 5–1 record and 1.26 ERA in 13 appearances. In 2014, he split the season between the Gulf Coast League (GCL) Astros and the rookie ball Greeneville Astros, accumulating a 5–1 record and 2.17 ERA in 12 games. He split the 2015 season between the Low-A Tri-City ValleyCats and the Single-A Quad Cities River Bandits, posting a 3–4 record and 3.12 ERA with 76 strikeouts in 66 1/3 innings of work. In 2016, Hernández split the year between the High-A Lancaster JetHawks and Quad Cities, recording a 6–8 record and 4.51 ERA with 107 strikeouts in 107 2/3 innings pitched. He split the 2017 season between the High-A Buies Creek Astros and the GCL Astros, pitching to a 5–5 record and 3.68 ERA in 18 appearances between the two teams. Following the completion of the minor league season, he played for the Águilas del Zulia of the Venezuelan Professional Baseball League.

=== Miami Marlins ===
On December 14, 2017, Hernández was selected by the Miami Marlins in the 2017 Rule 5 draft. He began the 2018 season on the disabled list with a tooth infection and made five rehab appearances Hernández made his major league debut by pitching two scoreless innings against the Atlanta Braves on May 10. He recorded his first major league strikeout in his next game, on May 13 against Ozzie Albies of the Braves. He picked up his first major league win on July 11 against the Milwaukee Brewers and finished his rookie season going 2–7 with a 5.21 ERA in 65 2/3 major league innings. Hernández split the 2019 season between Miami and the Triple-A New Orleans Baby Cakes, recording a 3–5 record and 5.03 ERA in 21 games for the Marlins and was 3–1 with a 1.13 ERA in nine games for the Baby Cakes.

In 2020, Hernández earned the fifth starter spot in the Marlins rotation at the start of the pandemic shortened season and pitched in six contests, registering a 3.16 ERA with 34 strikeouts in 25 2/3 innings pitched He suffered a lat injury on September 1 and spent the rest of the season on the injured list.

Hernández began the 2021 season in the rotation before suffering a biceps injury. He was reinstated from the injured list on June 3 only to suffer a “severe” right quad strain in his first game back, returning him to the injured list. Hernández was again activated on August 15 and pitched 5 1/3 innings of one-run ball, earning a no-decision. For the season, he made 11 starts with a 1–3 record and 4.18 ERA. In the 2022 season, he appeared in 20 games (10 starts) and was 3–6 with a 6.35 ERA and he was designated for assignment on November 15, 2022, and removed from the roster.

=== New York Mets ===
On November 18, 2022, the Marlins traded Hernández and Jeff Brigham to the New York Mets for Franklin Sanchez and a player to be named later (Jake Mangum) or cash considerations. He was initially optioned to the Triple-A Syracuse Mets in 2023, but suffered a right shoulder strain and was placed on the injured list to begin the year. On July 3, Hernández was activated from the injured list and optioned to Triple–A. On July 24, he was recalled to the active roster. However, he did not appear for the Mets before he was placed on the injured list with a right pectoral strain the next day where he remained for the rest of the season. On November 2, Hernández was outrighted to the minors, but rejected the assignment and chose to become a free agent.

=== Los Angeles Dodgers ===
On January 12, 2024, Hernández signed a minor league contract with the Los Angeles Dodgers. He began the season with the Triple-A Oklahoma City Baseball Club before having his contract purchased on May 15. In five appearances for the Dodgers, Hernández struggled to an 8.38 ERA with six strikeouts across 9 2/3 innings pitched. He was designated for assignment by the team on May 31, and outrighted back to Oklahoma City on June 6. However, Hernández rejected the assignment and became a free agent.

=== Milwaukee Brewers ===
On June 8, 2024, Hernández signed a one–year, major league contract with the Milwaukee Brewers. In four appearances for Milwaukee, he posted a 3.00 ERA with two strikeouts across six innings pitched. On June 19, Hernández was designated for assignment by Milwaukee. He elected free agency on June 25.

=== LG Twins ===
On July 20, 2024, Hernández signed with the LG Twins of the KBO League as a replacement for Casey Kelly, who had been released. In 11 games (9 starts) for the Twins, he posted a 3–2 record and 4.02 ERA with 55 strikeouts over 47 innings pitched.

On November 28, 2024, Hernández re–signed with the Twins on a $1.3 million contract. On August 4, 2025, Hernández parted ways with the Twins, having posted an ERA of 4.23 in 66 innings.

=== Toronto Blue Jays ===
On August 15, 2025, Hernández signed a minor league contract with the Toronto Blue Jays organization. He made four starts down the stretch for the Triple-A Buffalo Bisons, but struggled to an 0-3 record and 7.91 ERA with 15 strikeouts across 19 1/3 innings pitched. Hernández elected free agency following the season on November 6.

=== Atlanta Braves ===
On November 18, 2025, Hernández signed a minor league contract with the Atlanta Braves. He began the 2026 season with the Triple-A Gwinnett Stripers, recording a 4.83 ERA with 72 strikeouts across 20 appearances (11 starts). On July 19, 2026, the Braves selected Hernández's contract, adding him to their active roster. He made one appearance for the Braves, pitching three scoreless innings in relief and earning the win. On July 25, Hernández was designated for assignment by Atlanta. He elected free agency after clearing waivers two days later. On July 28, Hernández re-signed with Atlanta and was selected to the active roster. Following another appearance for the team, he was designated for assignment again on August 1. Hernández cleared waivers and elected free agency again on August 3; the following day, he re-signed with Atlanta on a new minor league contract. On September 2, Hernández was selected to the active roster. He made two appearances before being designated for assignment on September 9. Hernández elected free agency after clearing waivers two days later. On September 13, he re-signed with the Braves on a minor league contract. On September 24, Atlanta again selected Hernández's contract. He was designated for assignment again on September 29. Hernández elected free agency after clearing waivers on October 1.

== See also ==
- Rule 5 draft results
