= Robert Dugger =

American baseball player (born 1995)

Free agent
- Pitcher
- Born: July 3, 1995 (age 31); Tucson, Arizona, U.S.
- Bats: Right Throws: Right

Professional debut
- MLB: August 5, 2019, for the Miami Marlins
- KBO: March 26, 2024, for the SSG Landers

MLB statistics (through 2022 season)
- Win–loss record: 0–7
- Earned run average: 7.17
- Strikeouts: 67

KBO statistics (through 2024 season)
- Win–loss record: 0–3
- Earned run average: 12.71
- Strikeouts: 18
- Stats at Baseball Reference

Teams
- Miami Marlins (2019–2020); Seattle Mariners (2021); Tampa Bay Rays (2022); Cincinnati Reds (2022); SSG Landers (2024)

Robert Lee Dugger (born July 3, 1995) is an American professional baseball pitcher who is a free agent. He has previously played in Major League Baseball (MLB) for the Miami Marlins, Tampa Bay Rays, Seattle Mariners, and Cincinnati Reds. He has also played in the KBO League for the SSG Landers.

Dugger has the most career games started (13) without a win in MLB history.

== Amateur career ==
Dugger attended Tomball High School in Tomball, Texas. In 2013, as a senior, he led Tomball to a Texas UIL 4A State Championship, throwing a complete game in which he allowed only one run while striking out six, along with going 3–4 at the plate, including a three-run inside-the-park home run. He was named to the 4A All-State Baseball Team that year. Undrafted out of high school, he enrolled at Cisco Junior College where he played college baseball. In his two years at Cisco, he compiled earned run averages (ERA) of 5.40 and 4.37. After his sophomore year, he transferred to Texas Tech University. As a junior at Texas Tech, he was 6–1 with a 2.67 ERA over 60 2/3 relief innings.

== Professional career ==
=== Seattle Mariners ===
Dugger was drafted by the Seattle Mariners in the 18th round, with the 537th overall selection, of the 2016 Major League Baseball draft. After signing with the Mariners, Dugger was assigned to the Low-A Everett AquaSox before being reassigned to the rookie-level Arizona League Mariners. He also pitched in two games for the Triple-A Tacoma Rainiers. In 12 games (six starts) between the three affiliates, he went 2–1 with a 4.62 ERA and 38 strikeouts across 39 innings. In 2017, Dugger began the season with the Single-A Clinton LumberKings, where he compiled a 4–1 record, a 2.00 ERA, 69 strikeouts, and a walks plus hits per inning pitched (WHIP) of 0.99 in 22 games (nine starts). He was subsequently named a Midwest League All-Star before being promoted to the High-A Modesto Nuts in July, where he finished the season with a 2–5 record and a 3.94 ERA with 47 strikeouts over nine starts.

=== Miami Marlins ===
On December 7, 2017, Dugger, along either Nick Neidert and Christopher Torres, was traded to the Miami Marlins in exchange for Dee Gordon and international slot money. Dugger began 2018 with the Jupiter Hammerheads, earning Florida State League All-Star honors, and was promoted to the Jacksonville Jumbo Shrimp in May. In 25 starts between the two clubs, he pitched to a 10–7 record with a 3.40 ERA. He returned to the Jumbo Shrimp to begin 2019, earning Southern League All-Star honors, before being promoted to the New Orleans Baby Cakes in June.

On August 5, 2019, the Marlins selected Duggar's contract and promoted him to the major leagues. He made his major league debut that day versus the New York Mets, allowing six runs over five innings pitched.

=== Seattle Mariners (second stint) ===
On December 7, 2020, Dugger was claimed off waivers by the Seattle Mariners. On February 19, 2021, Dugger was designated for assignment after the signing of Ken Giles was made official. He cleared waivers and was sent outright to the Triple-A Tacoma Rainiers on February 23. On April 15, Dugger was selected to the active 40-man roster ahead of a doubleheader against the Baltimore Orioles. In 12 games for the Mariners during the year, Dugger recorded a 7.36 ERA with 19 strikeouts. On August 22, Dugger was designated for assignment by the Mariners again. On August 24, Dugger cleared waivers and was assigned outright to Triple-A Tacoma.

=== Tampa Bay Rays ===
On March 24, 2022, Dugger signed a minor league deal with the Tampa Bay Rays. He was assigned to the Triple-A Durham Bulls to begin the year, and was selected to Tampa Bay's active roster on May 1. He allowed three runs on eight hits with seven strikeouts across 5 1/3 innings, and was designated for assignment the following day.

=== Cincinnati Reds ===
On May 4, 2022, the Cincinnati Reds claimed Dugger off waivers. On May 9, the Reds designated him for assignment. On May 10, Dugger cleared waivers and was sent outright to the Triple-A Louisville Bats.

On May 12, Dugger was re-selected to the active roster. However, he didn't make an appearance for the Reds before he was designated for assignment again on May 14. On May 16, he cleared waivers and again returned to Louisville.

On July 7, the Reds yet again selected Dugger's contract. The next day, the Reds designated him for assignment and sent him outright to Triple-A. Dugger was selected to the major league roster for a third time on August 5 to make a start against the Milwaukee Brewers. On October 4, Dugger was once again designated for assignment. He cleared waivers and was sent outright to Louisville on October 6. However, Dugger rejected the outright assignment and instead elected free agency the same day.

=== Texas Rangers ===
On March 29, 2023, Dugger signed a minor league contract with the Texas Rangers organization. He spent the year with the Triple-A Round Rock Express, registering a 7–10 record and 4.31 ERA with 143 strikeouts in 146 1/3 innings pitched. Dugger became a free agent following the season on November 6.

=== SSG Landers ===
On November 27, 2023, Dugger signed with the SSG Landers of the KBO League. In 6 starts in 2024, he struggled to an 0–3 record and 12.71 ERA with 18 strikeouts across 22 2/3 innings pitched. Dugger was released by SSG on April 27, 2024.

=== Oakland Athletics ===
On May 17, 2024, Dugger signed a minor league contract with the Oakland Athletics organization. He pitched for the Triple-A Las Vegas Aviators, going 5–2 with a 4.79 ERA and 87 strikeouts across 20 games (16 starts). Dugger elected free agency following the season on November 4.

=== Guerreros de Oaxaca ===
On April 15, 2025, Dugger signed with the Guerreros de Oaxaca of the Mexican League. In three starts for Oaxaca, Dugger logged a 1–1 record and 3.97 ERA with nine strikeouts across 11 1/3 innings pitched.

=== Texas Rangers (second stint) ===
On May 6, 2025, Dugger signed a minor league contract with the Texas Rangers. In 10 appearances (four starts) for the Triple-A Round Rock Express, he struggled to a 1–4 record and 14.40 ERA with 21 strikeouts over 25 innings of work. Dugger was released by the Rangers organization on June 28.

=== Guerreros de Oaxaca (second stint) ===
On July 11, 2025, Dugger signed with the Guerreros de Oaxaca of the Mexican League. He made nine appearances (including seven starts) for the Guerreros, logging a 4–2 record and 3.97 ERA with 25 strikeouts over 34 innings of work.

Dugger appeared in 15 games (including 14 starts) for Oaxaca in 2026, compiling a 4–4 record and 6.68 ERA 49 strikeouts over 62 innings of work. He was released by the team on August 4, 2026.
