= Caleb Smith (baseball) =

American baseball player (born 1991)

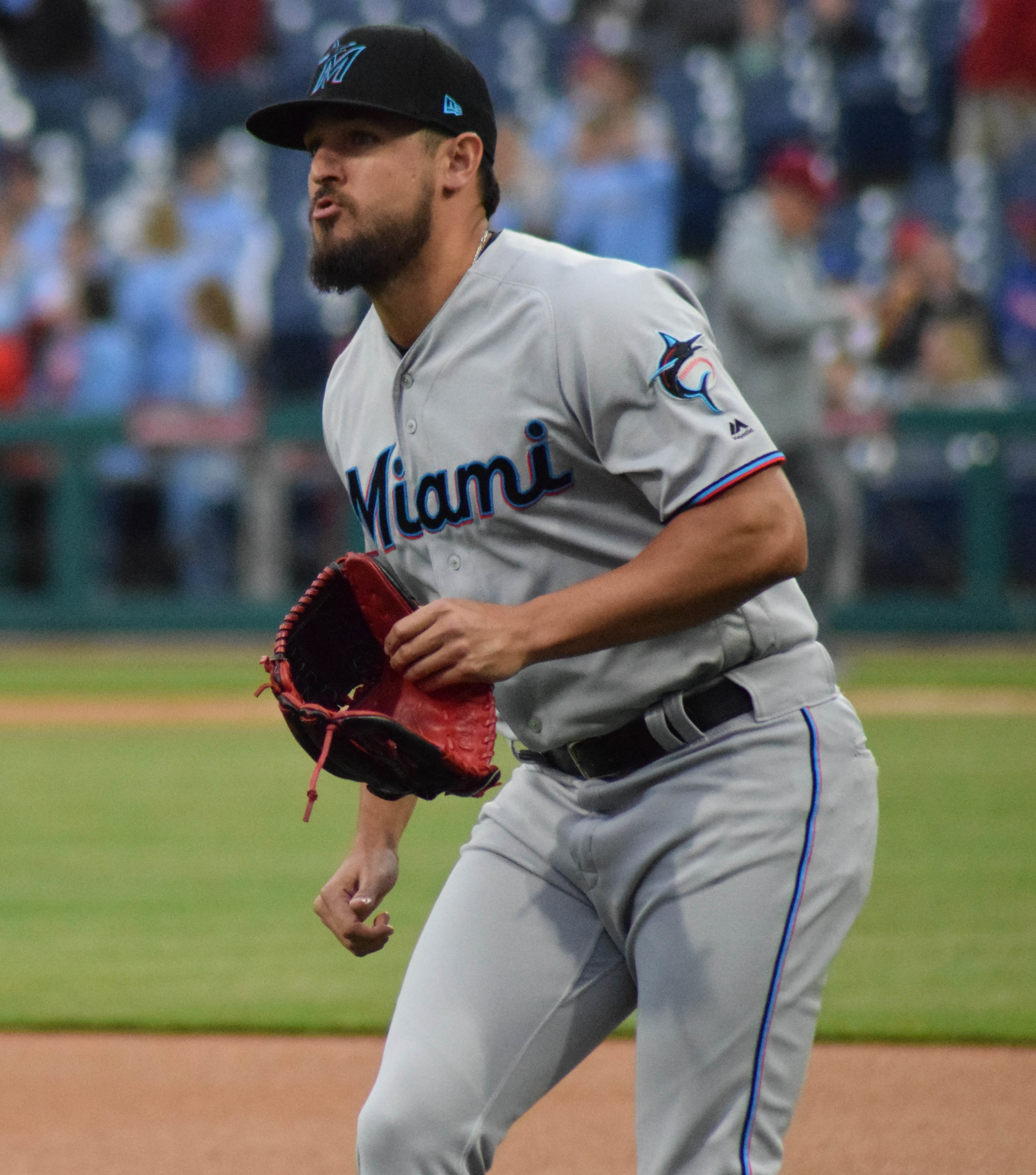
- Smith with the Miami Marlins in 2019

Dorados de Chihuahua – No. 23
- Pitcher
- Born: July 28, 1991 (age 34); Huntsville, Texas, U.S.
- Bats: Right Throws: Left

MLB debut
- July 17, 2017, for the New York Yankees

MLB statistics (through 2022 season)
- Win–loss record: 20–30
- Earned run average: 4.55
- Strikeouts: 478
- Stats at Baseball Reference

Teams
- New York Yankees (2017); Miami Marlins (2018–2020); Arizona Diamondbacks (2020–2022)

Caleb Anthony Smith (born July 28, 1991) is an American professional baseball pitcher for the Dorados de Chihuahua of the Mexican League. He has previously played in Major League Baseball (MLB) for the New York Yankees, Miami Marlins, and Arizona Diamondbacks.

== Amateur career ==
Following Smith's graduation from Huntsville High School in Huntsville, Texas, he enrolled at Sam Houston State University where he played college baseball. In 2013, his junior year, he had a 7–5 win–loss record with a 3.44 earned run average (ERA) over 18 games (16 starts).

== Professional career ==
=== New York Yankees ===
Smith was drafted by the New York Yankees in the 14th round of the 2013 Major League Baseball draft out of Sam Houston State University. He made his professional debut for the Staten Island Yankees and also started one game for the Trenton Thunder. He finished 1–2 with a 1.93 earned run average (ERA) and 57 strikeouts over 51 1/3 innings in 14 games (10 starts). He started 2014 with the Charleston RiverDogs. He was named the South Atlantic League player of the week on April 28 after setting a RiverDogs strikeout record with 13. He finished the season with the Tampa Yankees. In 27 starts between Charleston and Tampa, he pitched to a 10–9 record and 3.67 ERA. Smith spent 2015 with the Trenton Thunder where he was 10–7 with a 3.38 ERA in 25 games (24 starts) along with pitching one game for the Scranton/Wilkes-Barre RailRiders at the end of the season. In 2016, he returned to Trenton where he compiled a 3–5 record and 3.96 ERA in 63.2 innings pitched.

On December 8, 2016, Smith was selected by the Milwaukee Brewers in the 2016 Rule 5 draft and then traded to the Chicago Cubs.

The Cubs returned Smith to the Yankees on March 28, 2017. The Yankees promoted Smith to the major leagues on July 16.

=== Miami Marlins ===
On November 20, 2017, Smith was traded to the Miami Marlins along with Garrett Cooper in exchange for pitcher Mike King and international bonus pool money. Smith earned a spot in the Marlins' Opening Day starting rotation and was pitching effectively until he severely strained and tore his lat muscle from the bone during a game against the Rockies on June 26. He opted to have season-ending surgery which ended his 2018 campaign. He posted a 5–6 record as a rookie with a 4.19 ERA and 88 strikeouts in 77.1 innings pitched.

Smith earned a spot in the 2019 Opening Day rotation and had a stretch of six consecutive quality starts from April 7 through May 7. However, the Marlins placed him on the injured list with left hip inflammation after his outing on June 6. He was activated on July 6.

Overall in 2019, Smith was 10–11 with a 4.52 ERA. He established new career highs with 168 strikeouts and 28 starts. He also allowed 33 home runs, the second-highest total in a single season in Marlins history.

=== Arizona Diamondbacks ===
On August 31, 2020, Smith was traded from the Marlins alongside pitcher Humberto Mejía and Julio Frias to the Arizona Diamondbacks in a package deal for outfielder Starling Marte. Smith pitched in 4 games (3 starts), totaling 11 innings of work with 12 strikeouts.

On August 18, 2021, Smith was suspended for ten games by Major League Baseball for having a foreign substance in his glove. In 45 appearances (13 starts) for Arizona, Smith logged a 4–9 record and 4.83 ERA with 124 strikeouts in 113 2/3 innings pitched.

Smith pitched in 44 contests for the Diamondbacks in 2022, posting a 1–3 record and 4.11 ERA with 65 strikeouts in 70.0 innings of work. In the final day of the season, Smith left a game against the Los Angeles Dodgers with what was later diagnosed as a partial tear in the ulnar collateral ligament of his throwing arm. He was designated for assignment on November 15, 2022. On November 18, Smith was non–tendered by Arizona and became a free agent.

=== Pittsburgh Pirates ===
On February 9, 2023, Smith signed a minor league contract with the Pittsburgh Pirates organization. In 10 games for the Triple–A Indianapolis Indians, he struggled to a 6.40 ERA with 38 strikeouts across 45 innings pitched. Smith underwent Tommy John surgery in June, ending his season. He elected free agency following the season on November 6.

=== Cleburne Railroaders ===
On July 29, 2024, Smith signed with the Cleburne Railroaders of the American Association of Professional Baseball. In 3 starts for Cleburne, he struggled to a 6.75 ERA with 9 strikeouts across 9 1/3 innings pitched. Smith was released by the Railroaders on August 14. He re-signed with the Railroaders on August 24.

=== Dorados de Chihuahua ===
On April 15, 2025, Smith signed with the Dorados de Chihuahua of the Mexican League. In 20 games (18 starts) he threw 93 innings going 3-9 with a 5.52 ERA with 95 strikeouts and threw one complete game.

== Pitching style ==
Smith has a three-pitch mix, including a four-seam fastball, slider and changeup.

== Personal life ==
Smith and his wife, Tori, have two sons together.

== See also ==
- Rule 5 draft results
