= 2018 Milwaukee Brewers season =

2018 Milwaukee Brewers
- National League Central champions
- League: National League
- Division: Central
- Ballpark: Miller Park
- City: Milwaukee, Wisconsin
- Record: 96–67 (.589)
- Divisional place: 1st
- Owners: Mark Attanasio
- General managers: David Stearns
- Managers: Craig Counsell
- Television: Fox Sports Wisconsin (Brian Anderson, Bill Schroeder, Craig Coshun, Matt Lepay); Telemundo Wisconsin (Spanish-language coverage, Sunday home games; Hector Molina, Kevin Holden)
- Radio: 620 WTMJ (Bob Uecker, Jeff Levering, Lane Grindle)
- Stats: ESPN.com; Baseball Reference

The 2018 Milwaukee Brewers season was the 49th season for the Brewers in Milwaukee, the 21st in the National League, and 50th overall. On September 26, the Brewers clinched a playoff berth for the first time since 2011. They defeated the Chicago Cubs in the 2018 National League Central tie-breaker game on October 1 to win their first division title since 2011. They swept the Colorado Rockies in the NLDS to advance to the NLCS, where they lost in seven games to the Los Angeles Dodgers.

== Offseason ==
January 2, 2018	Traded RHP Dylan Baker to Los Angeles Dodgers for cash.
January 25, 2018	Traded OF Lewis Brinson and three other minor leaguers to Miami Marlins for OF Christian Yelich. Signed OF Lorenzo Cain to 5-year $80 million contract.

== Season standings ==
=== National League Central ===
NL Central
Team	W	L	Pct.	GB	Home	Road
Milwaukee Brewers	96	67	.589	—	51‍–‍30	45‍–‍37
Chicago Cubs	95	68	.583	1	51‍–‍31	44‍–‍37
St. Louis Cardinals	88	74	.543	7½	43‍–‍38	45‍–‍36
Pittsburgh Pirates	82	79	.509	13	44‍–‍36	38‍–‍43
Cincinnati Reds	67	95	.414	28½	37‍–‍44	30‍–‍51

=== Record vs. opponents ===
2018 National League record Source: MLB Standings Grid – 2018
Team	AZ	ATL	CHC	CIN	COL	LAD	MIA	MIL	NYM	PHI	PIT	SD	SF	STL	WSH	AL
Arizona	—	3–4	3–4	3–3	8–11	11–8	6–1	1–5	2–5	4–2	6–1	12–7	8–11	3–3	2–5	10–10
Atlanta	4–3	—	3–3	3–4	2–5	2–5	14–5	3–4	13–6	12–7	5–1	4–3	3–3	4–2	10–9	8–12
Chicago	4–3	3–3	—	11–8	3–3	4–3	5–2	11–9	6–1	4–2	10–9	5–2	3–3	9–10	4–3	13–7
Cincinnati	3–3	4–3	8–11	—	2–4	6–1	2–5	6–13	3–3	3–4	5–14	3–4	4–2	7–12	1–6	10–10
Colorado	11–8	5–2	3–3	4–2	—	7–13	2–4	2–5	6–1	5–2	3–3	11–8	12–7	2–5	5–2	13–7
Los Angeles	8–11	5–2	3–4	1–6	13–7	—	2–4	4–3	4–2	3–4	5–1	14–5	10–9	3–4	5–1	12–8
Miami	1–6	5–14	2–5	5–2	4–2	4–2	—	2–5	7–12	8–11	1–4	2–5	4–3	3–3	6–13	9–11
Milwaukee	5–1	4–3	9–11	13–6	5–2	3–4	5–2	—	4–3	3–3	7–12	4–2	6–1	11–8	4–2	13–7
New York	5–2	6–13	1–6	3–3	1–6	2–4	12–7	3–4	—	11–8	3–4	4–2	4–3	3–3	11–8	8–12
Philadelphia	2–4	7–12	2–4	4–3	2–5	4–3	11–8	3–3	8–11	—	6–1	3–3	4–3	4–3	8–11	12–8
Pittsburgh	1–6	1–5	9–10	14–5	3–3	1–5	4–1	12–7	4–3	1–6	—	3–4	4–3	8–11	2–5	15–5
San Diego	7–12	3–4	2–5	4–3	8–11	5–14	5–2	2–4	2–4	3–3	4–3	—	8–11	4–3	2–4	7–13
San Francisco	11–8	3–3	3–3	2–4	7–12	9–10	3–4	1–6	3–4	3–4	3–4	11–8	—	2–5	4–2	8–12
St. Louis	3–3	2–4	10–9	12–7	5–2	4–3	3–3	8–11	3–3	3–4	11–8	3–4	5–2	—	5–2	11–9
Washington	5–2	9–10	3–4	6–1	2–5	1–5	13–6	2–4	8–11	11–8	5–2	4–2	2–4	2–5	—	9–11

The October 1 tiebreaker games were regular-season games that are included here.

== Spring Training ==
=== Spring Training game log ===
2018 Brewers Spring Training Game Log: 19–12 (Home: 10–4; Away: 9–8)
February 5–1 (Home: 3–0; Road 2–1)

#	Date	Opponent	Time (CT)	Score	Win	Loss	Save	Record	Attendance	Streak
1	February 23	Cubs	1:05pm	2–1	**Burnes** (1–0)	Álvarez (0–1)	**Ramirez** (1)	1–0	4,489	W1
2	February 23	@ Giants	1:05pm	6–5	**Archer** (1–0)	Snelton (0–1)	**Uhen** (1)	2–0	7,610	W2
3	February 24	@ Angels	1:10pm	5–6	Anderson (1–0)	**Brown** (0–1)		2–1	6,019	L1
4	February 25	@ Diamondbacks	1:10pm	5–1	**Chacin** (1–0)	Greinke (0–1)		3–1	8,370	W1
5	February 26	Indians	1:05pm	7–6	**Frieri** (1–0)	Marshall (0–1)	**Davis** (1)	4–1	2,360	W2
6	February 27	Reds	1:05pm	6–3	**Brady** (1–0)	Herget (0–1)	**Burnes** (1)	5–1	2,291	W3
7	February 28	Giants	1:05pm	10–10				5–1	2,428	T1

March 14–11 (Home: 7–4; Road 7–7)

#	Date	Opponent	Time (CT)	Score	Win	Loss	Save	Record	Attendance	Streak
8	March 1	@ Diamondbacks	1:10pm	6–1	**Suter** (1–0)	Chafin (0–1)		6–1	6,763	W1
9	March 2	Mariners	1:05pm	2–4	Rzepczynski (1–0)	**Logan** (0–1)	Mills (1)	6–2	3,954	L1
10	March 3	@ Rockies	1:10pm	6–5	**Archer** (1–0)	Castellani (0–1)	**Wilkerson** (1)	7–2	8,909	W1
11	March 4	Indians	1:05pm	2–6	Kluber (1–0)	**Chacin** (1–1)		7–3	6,355	L1
12	March 6	@ White Sox	1:05pm	4–6	Dunning (1–0)	**Williams** (0–1)	Clark (1)	7–4	3,954	L2
13	March 7	@ Royals	1:05pm	10–6	**Derby** (1–0)	Griffin (0–1)		8–4	5,236	W1
14	March 8	Diamondbacks	1:05pm	6–11	Bracho (1–0)	**Wilkerson** (0–1)		8–5	5,231	L1
15	March 9	Athletics	1:05pm	0–2	Puk (1–0)	**Gallardo** (0–1)	Alcantara (1)	8–6	4,990	L2
16	March 10	Rockies	1:05pm	9–2	**Suter** (2–0)	Anderson (0–1)		9–6	7,592	W1
17	March 11	@ Indians	1:05pm	5–4	**Frieri** (2–0)	Plutko (0–1)	**Davis** (2)	10–6	6,048	W2
18	March 12	@ Dodgers	1:05pm	7–6	**Drake** (1–0)	Culver (0–1)	**Barnes** (1)	11–6	9,164	W3
19	March 13	Rangers	1:05pm	4–3	**Wilkerson** (1–1)	Bush (0–2)	**Beckman** (1)	12–6	6,236	W4
20	March 14	White Sox	1:05pm	11–3	**Chacin** (2–1)	Fulmer (0–4)		13–6	5,497	W5
21	March 15	@ Rangers	1:05pm	5–6	Martin (1–0)	**Frieri** (2–1)		13–7	6,762	L1
22	March 16	@ Reds	1:05pm	16–14	**Liz** (1–0)	Floro (1–1)		14–7	4,736	W1
23	March 17	Rockies	1:05pm	4–3	**Davies** (1–0)	Senzatela (2–2)	**Griep** (1)	15–7	7,273	W2
24	March 18	Dodgers	1:05pm	7–3	**Anderson** (1–0)	Banuelos (0–2)		16–7	7,178	W3
25	March 20	@ Rockies	1:10pm	4–4				16–7	9,197	T1
26	March 21	Athletics	1:05pm	4–3	**Hader** (1–0)	Alcantra (1–1)		17–7	4,371	W1
27	March 21	@ Mariners	6:40pm	4–7	Leake (1–1)	**Suter** (2–1)	Vincent (1)	17–8	6,846	L1
28	March 22	Royals	1:05pm	1–0	**Davies** (2–0)	Karns (1–2)	**Griep** (2)	18–8	6,173	W1
29	March 23	@ Cubs	1:05pm	3–4	Chatwood (4–0)	**Woodruff** (0–1)	Hancock (3)	18–9	15,831	L1
30	March 24	@ Athletics	12:05pm	10–5	**Chacin** (3–1)	Casilla (0–1)		19–9	7,283	W1
31	March 25	@ White Sox	12:05pm	1–16	Volstad (1–0)	**Ramirez** (0–1)		19–10	7,437	L1
32	March 26	@ Astros	7:05pm	2–5	McCurry (3–0)	**Hader** (1–1)	Giles (1)	19–11	20,276	L2
33	March 27	@ Astros	1:05pm	1–8	Morton (2–1)	**Davies** (2–1)		19–12	18,917	L3

Legend: = Win = Loss = Cancelled/Tie
Bold = Brewers team member

== Roster ==
2018 Milwaukee Brewers
Roster
Pitchers: 43 Matt Albers; 57 Chase Anderson; 49 Alec Asher; 50 Jacob Barnes; 39 Corbin Burnes; 33 Xavier Cedeño; 45 Jhoulys Chacín; 27 Zach Davies; 51 Oliver Drake; 47 Gio González; 41 Junior Guerra; 71 Josh Hader; 60 J. J. Hoover; 37 Adrian Houser; 32 Jeremy Jeffress; 38 Dan Jennings; 46 Corey Knebel; 48 Boone Logan; 28 Jorge López; 25 Jordan Lyles; 20 Wade Miley; 51 Freddy Peralta; 48 Joakim Soria; 35 Brent Suter; 56 Aaron Wilkerson; 54 Taylor Williams; 53 Brandon Woodruff; 48 Mike Zagurski	Catchers: 47 Jett Bandy; 15 Erik Kratz; 26 Jacob Nottingham; 9 Manny Piña; Infielders: 24 Jesús Aguilar; 3 Orlando Arcia; 25 Ji-man Choi; 2 Nick Franklin; 10 Brad Miller; 18 Mike Moustakas; 2 Nate Orf; 14 Hernán Pérez; 13 Tyler Saladino; 5 Jonathan Schoop; 21 Travis Shaw; 18 Eric Sogard; 5 Jonathan Villar	Outfielders: 8 Ryan Braun; 23 Keon Broxton; 6 Lorenzo Cain; 28 Curtis Granderson; 33 Brett Phillips; 16 Domingo Santana; 7 Eric Thames; 22 Christian Yelich	Manager: 30 Craig Counsell; Coaches: 11 Darnell Coles (hitting); 63 Robinzon Díaz (bullpen catcher); 55 Marcus Hanel (bullpen catcher); 36 Derek Johnson (pitching); 40 Jason Lane (assistant hitting); 59 Pat Murphy (bench/catching); 0 Ed Sedar (third base/outfield); 31 Carlos Subero (first base/infield); 58 Lee Tunnell (bullpen)

== Regular season ==
=== Game log ===
2018 regular season game log: 96–67 (Home: 51–30; Away: 45–37)
March: 3–0 (Home: 0–0; Away: 3–0)

#	Date	Opponent	Score	Win	Loss	Save	Attendance	Record	Box/ Streak
1	March 29	@ Padres	2–1 (12)	**Jeffress** (1–0)	Cimber (0–1)	**Barnes** (1)	44,649	1–0	W1
2	March 30	@ Padres	8–6	**Drake** (1–0)	Hand (0–1)	**Knebel** (1)	31,513	2–0	W2
3	March 31	@ Padres	7–3	**Suter** (1–0)	Perdomo (0–1)	—	35,106	3–0	W3

April: 14–13 (Home: 8–6; Away: 6–7)

#	Date	Opponent	Score	Win	Loss	Save	Attendance	Record	Box/ Streak
4	April 2	Cardinals	4–8	Mikolas (1–0)	**Davies** (0–1)	—	45,393	3–1	L1
5	April 3	Cardinals	5–4	**Jennings** (1–0)	Leone (0–1)	—	27,760	4–1	W1
6	April 4	Cardinals	0–6	Martínez (1–1)	**Chacín** (0–1)	—	27,674	4–2	L1
7	April 5	Cubs	0–8	Lester (1–0)	**Suter** (1–1)	—	24,310	4–3	L2
8	April 6	Cubs	5–4	**Albers** (1–0)	Montgomery (0–1)	—	37,758	5–3	W1
9	April 7	Cubs	2–5	Strop (2–0)	**Barnes** (0–1)	Morrow (1)	43,331	5–4	L1
10	April 8	Cubs	0–3	Quintana (1–1)	**Anderson** (0–1)	Morrow (2)	39,282	5–5	L2
11	April 9	@ Cardinals	5–4 (10)	**Albers** (1–0)	Holland (0–1)	—	35,189	6–5	W1
12	April 10	@ Cardinals	3–5 (11)	Leone (1–2)	**Hoover** (0–1)	—	35,220	6–6	L1
13	April 11	@ Cardinals	3–2	**Guerra** (1–0)	Wainwright (0–2)	**Albers** (1)	35,814	7–6	W1
14	April 13	@ Mets	5–6	Matz (1–1)	**Davies** (0–2)	Familia (7)	34,921	7–7	L1
15	April 14	@ Mets	5–1	**Anderson** (1–1)	Harvey (0–1)	**Hader** (1)	40,965	8–7	W1
16	April 15	@ Mets	2–3	Familia (1–0)	**Albers** (2–1)	—	26,035	8–8	L1
17	April 16	Reds	4–10	Castillo (1–2)	**Suter** (1–2)	—	28,677	8–9	L2
18	April 17	Reds	2–0	**Jennings** (2–0)	Romano (0–2)	**Hader** (2)	31,345	9–9	W1
19	April 18	Reds	2–0	**Davies** (1–2)	Mahle (1–3)	**Barnes** (2)	27,343	10–9	W2
20	April 19	Marlins	12–3	**Anderson** (2–1)	Peters (2–2)	—	26,087	11–9	W3
21	April 20	Marlins	8–0	**Chacín** (1–1)	Richards (0–2)	—	28,233	12–9	W4
22	April 21	Marlins	6–5	**Jeffress** (2–0)	Tazawa (0–1)	—	37,175	13–9	W5
23	April 22	Marlins	4–2	**Guerra** (2–0)	Smith (0–3)	**Hader** (3)	37,015	14–9	W6
24	April 24	@ Royals	5–2	**Davies** (2–2)	Kennedy (1–3)	—	16,555	15–9	W7
25	April 25	@ Royals	6–2	**Chacín** (2–1)	Hammel (0–2)	—	13,389	16–9	W8
26	April 26	@ Cubs	0–1	Hendricks (2–1)	**Anderson** (2–2)	Morrow (5)	37,197	16–10	L1
27	April 27	@ Cubs	2–3	Strop (3–0)	**Jennings** (2–1)	Morrow (6)	35,579	16–11	L2
28	April 28	@ Cubs	0–3	Quintana (3–1)	**Guerra** (2–1)	—	40,147	16–12	L3
29	April 29	@ Cubs	0–2	Chatwood (2–3)	**Davies** (2–3)	Morrow (7)	40,895	16–13	L4
30	April 30	@ Reds	6–5	**Woodruff** (1–0)	Peralta (1–2)	**Hader** (4)	9,536	17–13	W1

May: 19–8 (Home: 10–5; Away: 9–3)

#	Date	Opponent	Score	Win	Loss	Save	Attendance	Record	Box/ Streak
31	May 1	@ Reds	7–6	**Anderson** (3–2)	Bailey (0–4)	**Jeffress** (1)	12,933	18–13	W2
32	May 2	@ Reds	3–1	**Miley** (1–0)	Castillo (1–4)	**Jeffress** (2)	10,346	19–13	W3
33	May 4	Pirates	4–6	Kingham (2–0)	**Guerra** (2–2)	Vázquez (6)	32,869	19–14	L1
34	May 5	Pirates	5–3	**Hader** (1–0)	Kontos (2–3)	—	32,720	20–14	W1
35	May 6	Pirates	0–9	Kuhl (4–2)	**Anderson** (3–3)	—	38,285	20–15	L1
36	May 8	Indians	3–2	**Suter** (2–2)	Kluber (5–2)	**Hader** (5)	35,314	21–15	W1
37	May 9	Indians	2–6	Carrasco (5–1)	**Guerra** (2–3)	—	26,345	21–16	L1
38	May 10	@ Rockies	5–2	**Chacín** (3–1)	Márquez (2–4)	**Jeffress** (3)	31,093	22–16	W1
39	May 11	@ Rockies	11–10 (10)	**Jeffress** (3–0)	McGee (0–2)	**Hader** (6)	36,139	23–16	W2
40	May 12	@ Rockies	0–4	Freeland (3–4)	**Suter** (2–3)	—	35,408	23–17	L1
41	May 13	@ Rockies	7–3	**Peralta** (1–0)	Gray (4–5)	—	40,453	24–17	W1
42	May 14	@ Diamondbacks	7–2	**Guerra** (3–3)	Corbin (4–1)	—	17,390	25–17	W2
43	May 15	@ Diamondbacks	1–2	Bradley (1–1)	**Williams** (0–1)	Boxberger (12)	17,914	25–18	L1
44	May 16	@ Diamondbacks	8–2	**Woodruff** (2–0)	Koch (2–2)	—	16,762	26–18	W1
45	May 18	@ Twins	8–3	**Suter** (3–3)	Gibson (1–2)	—	29,349	27–18	W2
46	May 19	@ Twins	5–4	**Hader** (2–0)	Reed (0–3)	—	30,182	28–18	W3
47	May 20	@ Twins	1–3	Reed (1–3)	**Williams** (0–2)	Rodney (9)	28,577	28–19	L1
48	May 21	Diamondbacks	4–2	**Anderson** (4–3)	Greinke (3–3)	**Knebel** (2)	27,094	29–19	W1
49	May 22	Diamondbacks	1–0	**Albers** (3–1)	Koch (2–3)	**Knebel** (3)	27,065	30–19	W2
50	May 23	Diamondbacks	9–2	**Suter** (4–3)	Godley (4–4)	—	29,237	31–19	W3
51	May 24	Mets	0–5	Matz (2–3)	**Davies** (2–4)	—	33,803	31–20	L1
52	May 25	Mets	4–3 (10)	**Jeffress** (4–0)	Gsellman (4–1)	—	28,286	32–20	W1
53	May 26	Mets	17–6	**Jennings** (3–1)	Rhame (0–1)	—	37,258	33–20	W2
54	May 27	Mets	8–7	**Logan** (1–0)	Blevins (1–1)	**Knebel** (4)	39,715	34–20	W3
55	May 28	Cardinals	8–3	**Suter** (5–3)	Weaver (3–5)	—	42,867	35–20	W4
56	May 29	Cardinals	1–6	Wacha (6–1)	**Davies** (2–5)	—	40,982	35–21	L1
57	May 30	Cardinals	3–2	**Jeffress** (5–0)	Tuivailala (1–1)	**Knebel** (5)	33,133	36–21	W1

June: 12–13 (Home: 6–6; Away: 6–7)

#	Date	Opponent	Score	Win	Loss	Save	Attendance	Record	Box/ Streak
58	June 1	@ White Sox	3–8	Avilán (2–0)	**Anderson** (4–4)	—	20,004	36–22	L1
59	June 2	@ White Sox	5–0	**Chacín** (4–1)	Shields (1–6)	—	29,281	37–22	W1
60	June 3	@ White Sox	1–6	Volstad (1–3)	**Suter** (5–4)	—	25,338	37–23	L1
61	June 5	@ Indians	2–3	Kluber (9–2)	**Guerra** (3–4)	Allen (10)	22,330	37–24	L2
62	June 6	@ Indians	1–3	Carrasco (7–4)	**Anderson** (4–5)	Allen (11)	21,315	37–25	L3
63	June 8	@ Phillies	12–4	**Chacín** (5–1)	Velasquez (4–7)	—	22,196	38–25	W1
64	June 9	@ Phillies	12–3	**Suter** (6–4)	Arrieta (5–4)	—	25,304	39–25	W2
65	June 10	@ Phillies	3–4	Eflin (3–2)	**Jennings** (3–2)	Hunter (1)	31,175	39–26	L1
66	June 11	Cubs	2–7 (11)	Rosario (3–0)	**Albers** (3–2)	—	37,578	39–27	L2
67	June 12	Cubs	4–0	**Anderson** (5–5)	Chatwood (3–5)	—	35,459	40–27	W1
68	June 13	Cubs	1–0	**Chacín** (6–1)	Montgomery (2–2)	**Knebel** (6)	39,822	41–27	W2
69	June 15	Phillies	13–2	**Suter** (7–4)	Arrieta (5–5)	—	40,945	42–27	W3
70	June 16	Phillies	1–4	Eflin (4–2)	**Guerra** (3–5)	Neris (10)	40,531	42–28	L1
71	June 17	Phillies	9–10	Hunter (2–0)	**Anderson** (5–6)	Thompson (2)	40,985	42–29	L2
72	June 18	@ Pirates	0–1	Williams (6–4)	**Chacín** (6–2)	Vázquez (14)	10,672	42–30	L3
73	June 19	@ Pirates	3–2	**Peralta** (2–0)	Taillon (4–6)	**Knebel** (7)	14,152	43–30	W1
—	June 20	@ Pirates	**Postponed (rain)** (Makeup July 14)						
74	June 21	Cardinals	11–3	**Suter** (8–4)	Martínez (3–4)	—	32,764	44–30	W2
75	June 22	Cardinals	2–1	**Knebel** (1–0)	Norris (3–2)	—	36,275	45–30	W3
76	June 23	Cardinals	2–3	Mikolas (8–2)	**Jeffress** (5–1)	Norris (14)	35,551	45–31	L1
77	June 24	Cardinals	2–8	Weaver (4–6)	**Chacín** (6–3)	—	39,710	45–32	L2
78	June 26	Royals	5–1	**Peralta** (3–0)	Junis (5–9)	**Hader** (7)	34,412	46–32	W1
79	June 27	Royals	4–5	Duffy (4–7)	**Suter** (8–5)	Peralta (2)	38,436	46–33	L1
80	June 28	@ Reds	6–4	**Guerra** (4–5)	Garrett (0–1)	**Knebel** (8)	20,347	47–33	W1
81	June 29	@ Reds	8–2	**Anderson** (6–6)	Romano (4–8)	—	26,130	48–33	W2
82	June 30	@ Reds	3–12	Hernandez (3–0)	**Zagurski** (0–1)	—	24,640	48–34	L1

July: 15–13 (Home: 9–4; Away: 6–9)

#	Date	Opponent	Score	Win	Loss	Save	Attendance	Record	Box/ Streak
83	July 1	@ Reds	2–8	Harvey (4–5)	**Peralta** (3–1)	—	18,483	48–35	L2
84	July 2	Twins	6–5 (10)	**Knebel** (2–0)	Littell (0–2)	—	31,353	49–35	W1
85	July 3	Twins	2–0	**Guerra** (5–5)	Odorizzi (3–6)	**Knebel** (9)	32,375	50–35	W2
86	July 4	Twins	3–2	**Jeffress** (6–1)	Berríos (8–7)	**Knebel** (10)	36,700	51–35	W3
87	July 5	Braves	7–2	**Chacín** (7–3)	Fried (1–3)	**Jennings** (1)	27,557	52–35	W4
88	July 6	Braves	5–4	**Peralta** (4–1)	Foltynewicz (6–5)	**Knebel** (11)	31,452	53–35	W5
89	July 7	Braves	1–5	Sánchez (4–2)	**Wilkerson** (0–1)	—	38,813	53–36	L1
90	July 8	Braves	10–3	**Guerra** (6–5)	Newcomb (8–4)	—	43,262	54–36	W1
91	July 9	@ Marlins	3–4 (10)	Ziegler (1–5)	**Knebel** (2–1)	—	5,996	54–37	L1
92	July 10	@ Marlins	8–4	**Chacín** (8–3)	López (1–1)	**Burnes** (1)	5,624	55–37	W1
93	July 11	@ Marlins	4–5 (12)	Hernández (1–5)	**López** (0–1)	—	5,265	55–38	L1
94	July 12	@ Pirates	3–6	Taillon (6–7)	**Miley** (1–1)	Vázquez (21)	17,858	55–39	L2
95	July 13	@ Pirates	3–7	Kingham (4–4)	**Guerra** (6–6)	Crick (2)	21,431	55–40	L3
96	July 14	@ Pirates	1–2	Rodríguez (2–2)	**Anderson** (6–7)	Vázquez (22)	(Game 1)	55–41	L4
97	July 14	@ Pirates	2–6	Holmes (1–1)	**Suter** (8–6)	Vázquez (23)	24,474	55–42	L5
98	July 15	@ Pirates	6–7 (10)	Anderson (1–0)	**Jennings** (3–3)	—	17,583	55–43	L6
**89th All-Star Game in Washington, D.C.**
99	July 20	Dodgers	4–6	Hill (3–4)	**Williams** (0–3)	Jansen (28)	36,812	55–44	L7
100	July 21	Dodgers	4–2	**Burnes** (1–0)	Kershaw (3–5)	**Knebel** (12)	36,242	56–44	W1
101	July 22	Dodgers	2–11	Wood (6–5)	**Suter** (8–7)	Ferguson (2)	38,249	56–45	L1
102	July 23	Nationals	6–1	**Chacín** (9–3)	González (6–7)	—	26,073	57–45	W1
103	July 24	Nationals	5–4 (10)	**Jennings** (4–3)	Grace (0–1)	—	33,990	58–45	W2
104	July 25	Nationals	3–7	Roark (4–12)	**Peralta** (4–2)	—	37,586	58–46	L1
105	July 26	@ Giants	7–5	**Hader** (3–0)	Melancon (0–1)	**Knebel** (13)	40,643	59–46	W1
106	July 27	@ Giants	3–1	**Anderson** (7–7)	Bumgarner (3–4)	**Knebel** (14)	40,414	60–46	W2
107	July 28	@ Giants	7–1	**Chacín** (10–3)	Cueto (3–2)	—	40,735	61–46	W3
108	July 29	@ Giants	5–8	Suarez (4–6)	**Guerra** (6–7)	Smith (5)	41,312	61–47	L1
109	July 30	@ Dodgers	5–2	**Hader** (4–0)	Maeda (7–6)	—	44,933	62–47	W1
110	July 31	@ Dodgers	1–0	**Miley** (2–1)	Buehler (4–4)	**Jeffress** (4)	44,818	63–47	W2

August: 13–13 (Home: 7–5; Away: 6–8)

#	Date	Opponent	Score	Win	Loss	Save	Attendance	Record	Box/ Streak
111	August 1	@ Dodgers	4–6 (10)	Floro (4–2)	**Albers** (3–3)	—	41,686	63–48	L1
112	August 2	@ Dodgers	5–21	Kershaw (5–5)	**Chacín** (10–4)	—	45,087	63–49	L2
113	August 3	Rockies	5–3	**Burnes** (2–0)	Davis (1–5)	—	37,751	64–49	W1
114	August 4	Rockies	8–4	**Peralta** (5–2)	Anderson (6–4)	**Hader** (8)	40,524	65–49	W2
115	August 5	Rockies	4–5 (11)	Oberg (7–0)	**Knebel** (2–2)	Oh (3)	37,954	65–50	L1
116	August 7	Padres	5–11	Strahm (3–3)	**Hader** (4–1)	—	27,664	65–51	L2
117	August 8	Padres	8–4	**Chacín** (11–4)	Kennedy (0–1)	—	32,355	66–51	W1
118	August 9	Padres	4–8	Yates (4–0)	**Knebel** (2–3)	—	39,041	66–52	L1
119	August 10	@ Braves	1–10	Gausman (6–9)	**Peralta** (5–3)	—	36,519	66–53	L2
120	August 11	@ Braves	4–2	**Burnes** (3–0)	Biddle (3–1)	**Hader** (9)	40,297	67–53	W1
121	August 12	@ Braves	7–8	Venters (2–1)	**Jennings** (4–4)	Minter (10)	25,360	67–54	L1
122	August 14	@ Cubs	7–0	**Chacín** (12–4)	Quintana (10–9)	—	40,441	68–54	W1
123	August 15	@ Cubs	4–8	Hendricks (9–9)	**Guerra** (6–8)	—	39,619	68–55	L1
124	August 17	@ Cardinals	2–5	Flaherty (7–6)	**Peralta** (5–4)	Norris (24)	41,630	68–56	L2
125	August 18	@ Cardinals	2–7	Mikolas (13–3)	**Miley** (2–2)	—	46,040	68–57	L3
126	August 19	@ Cardinals	2–1	**Chacín** (13–4)	Gant (5–5)	**Hader** (10)	45,334	69–57	W1
127	August 20	Reds	5–2	**Anderson** (8–7)	Bailey (1–11)	**Jeffress** (5)	27,590	70–57	W2
128	August 21	Reds	7–9	Iglesias (2–1)	**Jennings** (4–5)	—	29,467	70–58	L1
129	August 22	Reds	4–0	**Peralta** (6–4)	Stephenson (0–2)	**Jeffress** (6)	33,058	71–58	W1
130	August 24	Pirates	7–6 (15)	**Lyles** (3–4)	Holmes (1–3)	—	32,694	72–58	W2
131	August 25	Pirates	1–9	Taillon (10–9)	**Chacín** (13–5)	—	40,622	72–59	L1
132	August 26	Pirates	7–4	**Anderson** (9–7)	Archer (4–7)	**Jeffress** (7)	39,607	73–59	W1
133	August 28	@ Reds	7–9	DeSclafani (7–4)	**Guerra** (6–9)	Iglesias (24)	13,242	73–60	L1
134	August 29	@ Reds	13–12 (10)	**Jeffress** (7–1)	Iglesias (2–3)	—	11,777	74–60	W1
135	August 30	@ Reds	2–1 (11)	**Soria** (1–3)	Brice (2–3)	**Hader** (11)	13,403	75–60	W2
136	August 31	@ Nationals	4–1	**Chacín** (14–5)	Roark (8–14)	**Jeffress** (8)	30,676	76–60	W3

September/October: 20–7 (Home: 11–4; Away: 9–3)

#	Date	Opponent	Score	Win	Loss	Save	Attendance	Record	Box/ Streak
137	September 1	@ Nationals	4–5	Holland (1–2)	**Soria** (1–4)	Miller (2)	30,875	76–61	L1
138	September 2	@ Nationals	9–4	**Woodruff** (3–0)	Rodríguez (2–2)	—	33,032	77–61	W1
139	September 3	Cubs	4–3	**Jeffress** (8–1)	Cishek (4–3)	—	44,462	78–61	W2
140	September 4	Cubs	11–1	**Miley** (3–2)	Montgomery (4–5)	—	37,269	79–61	W3
141	September 5	Cubs	4–6	Quintana (12–9)	**Chacín** (14–6)	Strop (12)	37,427	79–62	L1
142	September 7	Giants	4–2	**Hader** (5–1)	Strickland (3–5)	**Jeffress** (9)	30,916	80–62	W1
143	September 8	Giants	4–3	**González** (8–11)	Stratton (9–9)	**Jeffress** (10)	40,686	81–62	W2
144	September 9	Giants	6–3	**Burnes** (4–0)	Bumgarner (5–6)	**Knebel** (15)	35,388	82–62	W3
145	September 10	@ Cubs	3–2	**Miley** (4–2)	Lester (15–6)	**Jeffress** (11)	38,471	83–62	W4
146	September 11	@ Cubs	0–3	Quintana (13–9)	**Chacín** (14–7)	Strop (13)	37,017	83–63	L1
147	September 12	@ Cubs	5–1	**Hader** (6–1)	Hendricks (11–11)	—	40,234	84–63	W1
148	September 14	Pirates	7–4	**Burnes** (5–0)	Archer (4–8)	**Jeffress** (12)	39,482	85–63	W2
149	September 15	Pirates	1–3	Nova (9–9)	**Davies** (2–6)	Vázquez (33)	37,358	85–64	L1
150	September 16	Pirates	2–3	Williams (13–9)	**Chacín** (14–8)	Vázquez (34)	32,180	85–65	L2
151	September 17	Reds	8–0	**Miley** (5–2)	DeSclafani (7–6)	**Woodruff** (1)	32,145	86–65	W1
152	September 18	Reds	1–3	Romano (8–11)	**Anderson** (9–8)	Iglesias (28)	30,366	86–66	L1
153	September 19	Reds	7–0	**González** (9–11)	Harvey (7–9)	—	33,443	87–66	W1
154	September 21	@ Pirates	8–3	**Burnes** (6–0)	Santana (3–4)	—	19,243	88–66	W2
155	September 22	@ Pirates	0–3	Williams (14–9)	**Davies** (2–7)	Vázquez (36)	23,070	88–67	L1
156	September 23	@ Pirates	13–6	**Knebel** (3–3)	Kingham (5–7)	—	20,623	89–67	W1
157	September 24	@ Cardinals	6–4	**Burnes** (7–0)	Norris (3–6)	**Knebel** (16)	36,508	90–67	W2
158	September 25	@ Cardinals	12–4	**Williams** (1–3)	Gomber (6–2)	—	38,051	91–67	W3
159	September 26	@ Cardinals	2–1	**Chacín** (15–8)	Shreve (3–4)	**Jeffress** (13)	40,644	92–67	W4
160	September 28	Tigers	6–5	**Soria** (2–4)	Alcántara (1–1)	**Jeffress** (14)	44,770	93–67	W5
161	September 29	Tigers	6–5	**Soria** (3–4)	Stumpf (1–5)	**Jeffress** (15)	45,520	94–67	W6
162	September 30	Tigers	11–0	**González** (10–11)	Turnbull (0–2)	—	41,848	95–67	W7
163	October 1	@ Cubs	3–1	**Knebel** (4–3)	Wilson (4–5)	**Hader** (12)	38,450	96–67	W8

Legend: = Win = Loss = Postponement
Bold = Brewers team member

== Player stats ==
=== Batting ===
Note: G = Games played; AB = At bats; R = Runs; H = Hits; 2B = Doubles; 3B = Triples; HR = Home runs; RBI = Runs batted in; SB = Stolen bases; BB = Walks; AVG = Batting average; SLG = Slugging average

Player	G	AB	R	H	2B	3B	HR	RBI	SB	BB	AVG	SLG
Christian Yelich	147	574	118	187	34	7	36	110	22	68	.326	.598
Lorenzo Cain	141	539	90	166	25	2	10	38	30	71	.308	.417
Travis Shaw	152	498	73	120	23	0	32	86	5	78	.241	.480
Jesús Aguilar	149	492	80	135	25	0	35	108	0	58	.274	.539
Ryan Braun	125	405	59	103	25	1	20	64	11	34	.254	.469
Orlando Arcia	119	348	32	82	16	0	3	30	7	15	.236	.307
Hernán Pérez	132	316	36	80	11	2	9	29	11	17	.253	.386
Manny Piña	98	306	39	77	13	2	9	28	2	21	.252	.395
Jonathan Villar	87	257	26	67	10	1	6	22	14	19	.261	.377
Eric Thames	96	247	41	54	10	3	16	37	7	29	.219	.478
Domingo Santana	85	211	21	56	14	1	5	20	1	20	.265	.412
Erik Kratz	67	203	18	48	6	0	6	23	1	6	.236	.355
Mike Moustakas	54	195	20	50	12	0	8	33	1	19	.256	.441
Jonathan Schoop	46	124	16	25	4	0	4	21	1	7	.202	.331
Tyler Saladino	52	118	11	29	3	0	5	16	2	9	.246	.398
Eric Sogard	55	97	7	13	3	0	0	2	3	12	.134	.165
Keon Broxton	51	78	15	14	2	2	4	11	5	11	.179	.410
Brad Miller	27	74	5	17	3	1	2	8	0	6	.230	.378
Jett Bandy	24	64	5	12	2	0	1	1	0	3	.188	.266
Curtis Granderson	19	41	12	9	1	1	2	3	0	12	.220	.439
Ji Man Choi	12	30	4	7	2	0	2	5	0	2	.233	.500
Brett Phillips	15	22	2	4	0	1	0	4	0	2	.182	.273
Nate Orf	15	21	4	2	0	0	1	1	1	3	.095	.238
Jacob Nottingham	9	20	2	4	1	0	0	0	0	4	.200	.250
Nick Franklin	1	2	0	0	0	0	0	0	0	0	.000	.000
Pitcher totals	163	260	18	37	7	0	2	11	0	11	.142	.192
Team totals	163	5542	754	1398	252	24	218	711	124	537	.252	.424

=== Pitching ===
Note: W = Wins; L = Losses; ERA = Earned run average; G = Games pitched; GS = Games started; SV = Saves; IP = Innings pitched; H = Hits allowed; R = Runs allowed; ER = Earned runs allowed; BB = Walks allowed; SO = Strikeouts

Player	W	L	ERA	G	GS	SV	IP	H	R	ER	BB	SO
Jhoulys Chacín	15	8	3.50	35	35	0	192.2	153	83	75	71	156
Chase Anderson	9	8	3.93	30	30	0	158.0	131	71	69	57	128
Junior Guerra	6	9	4.09	31	26	0	141.0	143	74	64	55	136
Brent Suter	8	7	4.44	20	18	0	101.1	102	55	50	19	84
Josh Hader	6	1	2.43	55	0	12	81.1	36	23	22	30	143
Wade Miley	5	2	2.57	16	16	0	80.2	71	28	23	27	50
Freddy Peralta	6	4	4.25	16	14	0	78.1	49	37	37	40	96
Jeremy Jeffress	8	1	1.29	73	0	15	76.2	49	12	11	27	89
Zach Davies	2	7	4.77	13	13	0	66.0	67	36	35	21	49
Dan Jennings	4	5	3.22	72	1	1	64.1	66	27	23	23	45
Corey Knebel	4	3	3.58	57	0	16	55.1	38	23	22	22	88
Taylor Williams	1	3	4.25	56	0	0	53.0	53	28	25	25	57
Jacob Barnes	0	1	3.33	49	0	2	48.2	51	24	18	23	47
Brandon Woodruff	3	0	3.61	19	4	1	42.1	36	18	17	14	47
Corbin Burnes	7	0	2.61	30	0	1	38.0	27	11	11	11	35
Matt Albers	3	3	7.34	34	0	1	34.1	45	29	28	12	32
Gio González	3	0	2.13	5	5	0	25.1	14	7	6	10	22
Joakim Soria	3	1	4.09	26	0	0	22.0	18	11	10	6	26
Jorge López	0	1	2.75	10	0	0	19.2	16	6	6	13	15
Jordan Lyles	1	0	3.31	11	0	0	16.1	12	7	6	9	22
Adrian Houser	0	0	3.29	7	0	0	13.2	13	5	5	7	8
Oliver Drake	1	0	6.39	11	0	0	12.2	14	9	9	8	15
Boone Logan	1	0	5.91	16	0	0	10.2	15	7	7	10	14
Aaron Wilkerson	0	1	10.00	3	1	0	9.0	12	10	10	3	10
Xavier Cedeño	0	0	1.13	15	0	0	8.0	7	1	1	3	6
Hernán Pérez	0	0	13.50	3	0	0	3.1	7	5	5	1	2
Erik Kratz	0	0	3.00	3	0	0	3.0	3	2	1	1	2
Alec Asher	0	0	0.00	2	0	0	3.0	2	0	0	1	2
J. J. Hoover	0	1	20.25	2	0	0	1.1	4	3	3	2	0
Mike Zagurski	0	1	63.00	2	0	0	1.0	5	7	7	2	2
Team totals	96	67	3.73	163	163	49	1461.0	1259	659	606	553	1428

=== Postseason game log ===
2018 postseason game log: 6–4 (Home: 4–2; Away: 2–2)
NLDS: Brewers win series 3–0 (Home: 2–0; Away: 1–0)

#	Date	Opponent	Score	Win	Loss	Save	Attendance	Record
1	October 4	Rockies	3–2 (10)	Soria (1–0)	Ottavino (0–1)	—	43,382	1–0
2	October 5	Rockies	4–0	Chacín (1–0)	Anderson (0–1)	Jeffress (1)	44,547	2–0
3	October 7	@ Rockies	6–0	Burnes (1–0)	Márquez (0–1)	—	49,658	3–0

NLCS: Brewers lose series 3–4 (Home: 2–2; Away: 1–2)

#	Date	Opponent	Score	Win	Loss	Save	Attendance	Record
1	October 12	Dodgers	6–5	Woodruff (1–0)	Kershaw (0-1)	Knebel (1)	43,615	1–0
2	October 13	Dodgers	3–4	Baez (1-0)	Jeffress (0-1)	Jansen (1)	43,905	1–1
3	October 15	@ Dodgers	4–0	Chacín (1–0)	Buehler (0-1)	—	52,793	2–1
4	October 16	@ Dodgers	1–2 (13)	Urias (1–0)	Guerra (0–1)	—	53,764	2–2
5	October 17	@ Dodgers	2–5	Kershaw (1–1)	Woodruff (1–1)	Jansen (2)	54,502	2–3
6	October 19	Dodgers	7–2	Knebel (1–0)	Ryu (0–1)	—	43,619	3–3
7	October 20	Dodgers	1–5	Madson (1–0)	Chacín (1–1)	—	44,097	3–4

== Postseason rosters ==
Playoff rosters
National League Division Series

- Pitchers: 20 Wade Miley 32 Jeremy Jeffress 39 Corbin Burnes 41 Junior Guerra 45 Jhoulys Chacín 46 Corey Knebel 47 Gio González 48 Joakim Soria 51 Freddy Peralta 53 Brandon Woodruff 71 Josh Hader
- Catchers: 9 Manny Piña 15 Erik Kratz
- Infielders: 3 Orlando Arcia 5 Jonathan Schoop 14 Hernán Pérez 18 Mike Moustakas 21 Travis Shaw 24 Jesús Aguilar
- Outfielders: 6 Lorenzo Cain 8 Ryan Braun 16 Domingo Santana 22 Christian Yelich 23 Keon Broxton 28 Curtis Granderson

National League Championship Series

- Pitchers: 20 Wade Miley 27 Zach Davies (Games 5–7) 32 Jeremy Jeffress 33 Xavier Cedeño 39 Corbin Burnes 41 Junior Guerra 45 Jhoulys Chacín 46 Corey Knebel 47 Gio González (Games 1–4) 48 Joakim Soria 51 Freddy Peralta 53 Brandon Woodruff 71 Josh Hader
- Catchers: 9 Manny Piña 15 Erik Kratz
- Infielders: 3 Orlando Arcia 5 Jonathan Schoop 14 Hernán Pérez 18 Mike Moustakas 21 Travis Shaw 24 Jesús Aguilar
- Outfielders: 6 Lorenzo Cain 8 Ryan Braun 16 Domingo Santana 22 Christian Yelich 28 Curtis Granderson

== Detailed records ==
National League
Opponent	Home	Away	Total	Pct.	Runs scored	Runs allowed
NL East
Atlanta Braves	3–1	1–2	4–3	.571	35	34
Miami Marlins	4–0	1–2	5–2	.714	45	23
New York Mets	3–1	1–2	4–3	.571	41	31
Philadelphia Phillies	1–2	2–1	3–3	.500	50	27
Washington Nationals	2–1	2–1	4–2	.667	31	22
	13–5	7–8	20–13	.606	202	137
NL Central
Milwaukee Brewers	—	—	—	—	—	—
Chicago Cubs	5–5	4–6	9–11	.450	57	61
Cincinnati Reds	6–3	7–3	13–6	.684	97	84
Pittsburgh Pirates	4–5	3–7	7–12	.368	73	90
St. Louis Cardinals	5–5	6–3	11–8	.579	75	77
	20–18	20–19	40–37	.519	302	312
NL West
Arizona Diamondbacks	3–0	2–1	5–1	.833	30	10
Colorado Rockies	2–1	3–1	5–2	.714	40	31
Los Angeles Dodgers	1–2	2–2	3–4	.429	25	48
San Diego Padres	1–2	3–0	4–2	.667	34	33
San Francisco Giants	3–0	3–1	6–1	.857	36	23
	10–5	13–5	23–10	.697	165	145

American League
Opponent	Home	Away	Total	Pct.	Runs scored	Runs allowed
Chicago White Sox	—	1–2	1–2	.333	9	14
Cleveland Indians	1–1	0–2	1–3	.250	8	14
Detroit Tigers	3–0	—	3–0	1.000	23	10
Kansas City Royals	1–1	2–0	3–1	.750	20	10
Minnesota Twins	3–0	2–1	5–1	.833	25	17
	8–2	5–5	13–7	.650	85	65

== Farm system ==
The Brewers' farm system consisted of eight minor league affiliates in 2018. They operated a Dominican Summer League team as a co-op with the Cleveland Indians.

Level	Team	League	Manager
Triple-A	Colorado Springs Sky Sox	Pacific Coast League	Rick Sweet
Double-A	Biloxi Shuckers	Southern League	Mike Guerrero
Class A-Advanced	Carolina Mudcats	Carolina League	Joe Ayrault
Class A	Wisconsin Timber Rattlers	Midwest League	Matt Erickson
Rookie	Helena Brewers	Pioneer League	Néstor Corredor
Rookie	AZL Brewers	Arizona League	Rafael Neda
Rookie	DSL Brewers	Dominican Summer League	—
Rookie	DSL Indians/Brewers	Dominican Summer League	—
