= Kyle Muller =

American baseball player (born 1997)

Chunichi Dragons – No. 93
- Pitcher
- Born: October 7, 1997 (age 29); Dallas, Texas, U.S.
- Bats: Right Throws: Left

Professional debut
- MLB: June 16, 2021, for the Atlanta Braves
- NPB: April 17, 2025, for the Chunichi Dragons

MLB statistics (through 2024 season)
- Win–loss record: 4–11
- Earned run average: 5.90
- Strikeouts: 141

NPB statistics (through August 18, 2026)
- Win–loss record: 9-15
- Earned run average: 3.06
- Strikeouts: 157
- Stats at Baseball Reference

Teams
- Atlanta Braves (2021–2022); Oakland Athletics (2023–2024); Chunichi Dragons (2025–present)

Kyle Douglas Muller (born October 7, 1997) is an American professional baseball pitcher for the Chunichi Dragons of Nippon Professional Baseball (NPB). He has previously played in Major League Baseball (MLB) for the Atlanta Braves and Oakland Athletics.

He was drafted by the Braves in the second round of the 2016 MLB draft, and made his MLB debut with them in 2021. He was traded to Athletics after the 2022 season where he played for two seasons before being designated for assignment in 2024 and declaring free agency.

== Amateur career ==
Muller attended Jesuit College Preparatory School of Dallas in Dallas, Texas. He was a pitcher and outfielder. During his senior year he set the national record for strikeouts in a row with 24. He was named the Gatorade Baseball Player of the Year after going 8–0 with a 0.46 earned run average (ERA) and 133 strikeouts as a pitcher and hit .396 with 15 home runs and 52 runs batted in (RBI). Muller also played high school basketball.

Muller committed to the University of Texas at Austin to play college baseball for the Texas Longhorns.

== Professional career ==
=== Atlanta Braves ===
The Atlanta Braves selected Muller with the 44th pick of the 2016 MLB draft. He signed with the Braves, receiving a $2.5 million signing bonus, to forgo his commitment to Texas.

After signing, Muller was assigned to the GCL Braves, where he posted a 1–0 record with a 0.65 ERA in 27 2/3 innings pitched. In 2017, Muller pitched for the Danville Braves where he pitched to a 1–1 record and 4.15 ERA in 11 games started. He began the 2018 season with the Rome Braves, and was promoted to the Florida Fire Frogs on May 8. He joined the Mississippi Braves on August 6. In 25 starts between the three clubs, Muller went 11–3 with a 3.03 ERA and a 1.23 WHIP, while leading the league with 16 wild pitches. Muller spent the entire 2019 season with Mississippi. He had a 7–6 record and a 3.14 ERA in 22 starts.

Muller did not play in a game in 2020 due to the cancellation of the minor league season because of the COVID-19 pandemic. After the year, the Braves added Muller to their 40-man roster.

On June 16, 2021, Muller was promoted to the major leagues for the first time after Tucker Davidson was placed on the injured list. He made his MLB debut that day, pitching one inning and allowing two runs against the Boston Red Sox. He made his first career start on June 21 against the New York Mets, allowing 1 run over 4 innings during the 4–2 loss. On July 3, Muller was optioned back down to Triple-A Gwinnett. In 2021 with the Braves he was 2–4 with a 4.17 ERA in nine games (8 starts).

=== Oakland Athletics ===
On December 12, 2022, the Oakland Athletics acquired Muller from the Braves in a three-team trade in which the Atlanta Braves acquired Sean Murphy, the Brewers acquired William Contreras, Joel Payamps, and Justin Yeager, and the Athletics also acquired Manny Piña, Esteury Ruiz, Freddy Tarnok, and Royber Salinas. On March 24, 2023, Muller was named the Opening Day starter for Oakland. He pitched five innings against the Los Angeles Angels, yielding four hits and one earned run while recording one walk and three strikeouts. In 21 games (13 starts), he registered a 1–5 record and 7.60 ERA with 56 strikeouts across 77 innings pitched.

Muller made 18 appearances for Oakland in 2024, compiling a 4.22 ERA with 35 strikeouts over 42 2/3 innings pitched. On August 13, 2024, Muller was designated for assignment by the Athletics. He cleared waivers and was sent outright to the Triple–A Las Vegas Aviators the next day. On September 11, the Athletics selected Muller's contract, adding him to their active roster. On November 1, 2024, he was removed from the 40–man roster and sent outright to Las Vegas, he elected free agency the following day.

=== Chunichi Dragons ===
On December 15, 2024, Muller signed with the Chunichi Dragons of Nippon Professional Baseball.

== Personal life ==
His older brother, Chris, is also a Major League Baseball pitcher.
