= Drew Gagnon =

American baseball pitcher (born 1990)

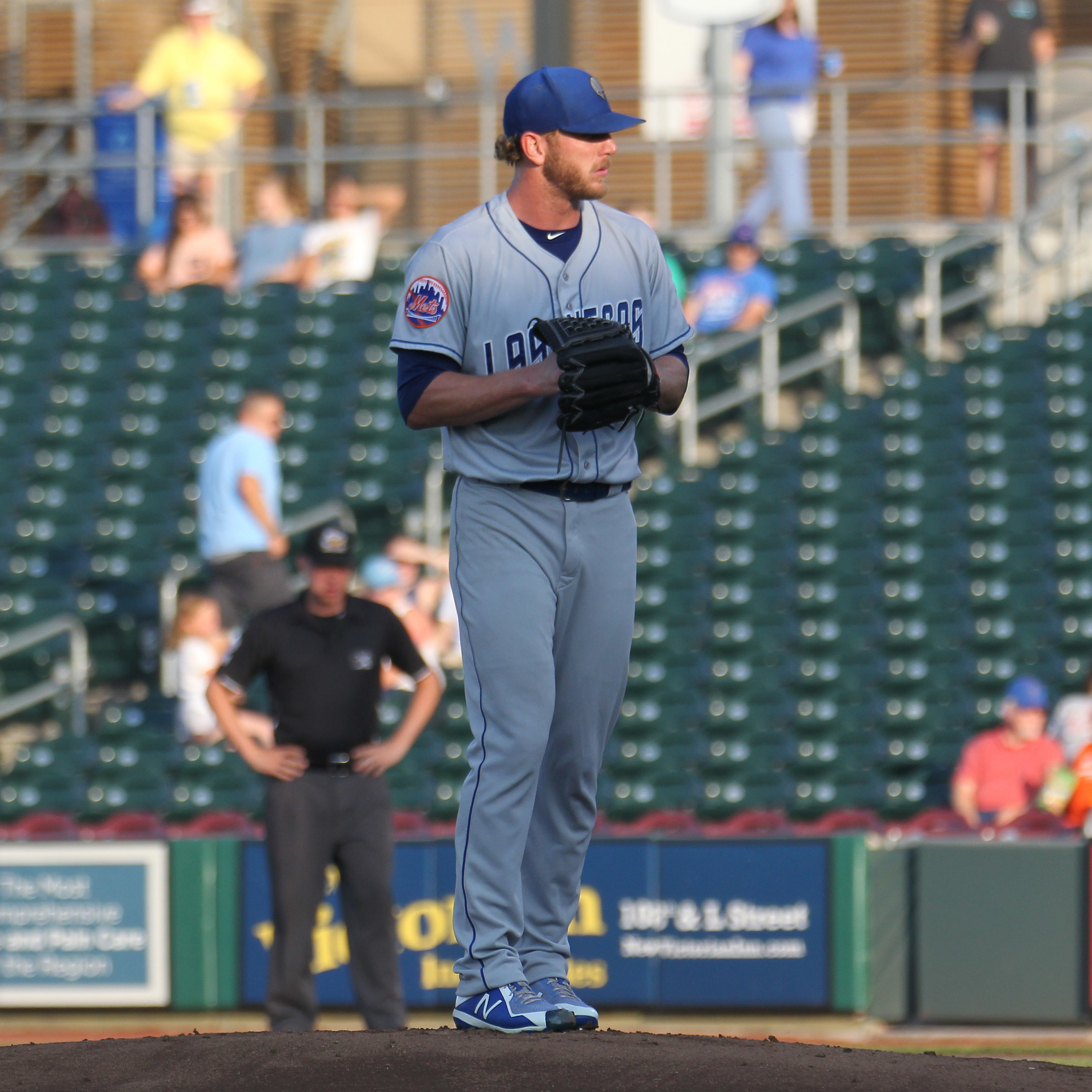
- Gagnon with the Las Vegas 51s in 2018

Wei Chuan Dragons – No. 37
- Pitcher
- Born: June 26, 1990 (age 36); Columbia, California, U.S.
- Bats: Right Throws: Right

Professional debut
- MLB: July 10, 2018, for the New York Mets
- KBO: May 8, 2020, for the Kia Tigers
- CPBL: April 8, 2021, for the Wei Chuan Dragons

MLB statistics (through 2019 season)
- Win–loss record: 5–2
- Earned run average: 7.32
- Strikeouts: 25

KBO statistics (through 2020 season)
- Win–loss record: 11–8
- Earned run average: 4.34
- Strikeouts: 141

CPBL statistics (through 2025 season)
- Win–loss record: 51–33
- Earned run average: 3.00
- Strikeouts: 588
- Stats at Baseball Reference

Teams
- New York Mets (2018–2019); Kia Tigers (2020); Wei Chuan Dragons (2021–present)

Career highlights and awards
- CPBL: Taiwan Series champion (2023); CPBL MVP of the Year (2023)

Andrew Miles Gagnon (born June 26, 1990) is an American professional baseball pitcher for the Wei Chuan Dragons of the Chinese Professional Baseball League (CPBL). He has previously played in Major League Baseball (MLB) for the New York Mets and in the KBO League for the Kia Tigers.

== Career ==
=== Amateur ===
Gagnon attended Liberty High School in Brentwood, California in 2008. As a senior, he compiled a 1.58 ERA. He was drafted by the Pittsburgh Pirates in the tenth round of the 2008 MLB draft, but he did not sign and instead enrolled at Long Beach State University where he played college baseball. In 2010, he played collegiate summer baseball with the Brewster Whitecaps of the Cape Cod Baseball League, and was named a league all-star. In 2011, as a junior at Long Beach State, he was 4–10 with a 2.81 ERA in 15 starts, earning him a spot on the All-Big West Second Team.

=== Milwaukee Brewers ===
He was drafted by the Milwaukee Brewers in the third round of the 2011 MLB draft, and he signed.

Gagnon made his professional debut with the Helena Brewers, compiling an 8.05 ERA in 19 innings pitched. In 2012 he pitched for the Wisconsin Timber Rattlers and Brevard County Manatees where he was a combined 7–3 with a 2.83 ERA in 23 total starts, in 2013 he played for Brevard County and the Huntsville Stars where he pitched to a 7–13 record and 5.43 ERA in 26 starts between both teams, and in 2014 he pitched with Huntsville where he compiled an 11–6 record and 3.96 ERA in 28 starts. Gagnon spent the 2015 season with both the Biloxi Shuckers and Colorado Springs Sky Sox, pitching to a 2–12 record and 6.67 ERA in 26 total games (19 starts) between both teams, and he returned to those two teams in 2016, going a combined 3–1 with a 4.48 ERA in 36 games (31 relief appearances).

=== Los Angeles Angels ===
On December 13, 2016, Gagnon, along with Martín Maldonado, was traded to the Los Angeles Angels in exchange for Jett Bandy. He spent the 2017 season with the Salt Lake Bees where he compiled a 1–1 record and 6.25 ERA in 31 games (ten starts). He became a free agent following the season on November 6, 2017.

=== New York Mets ===
On December 22, 2017, Gagnon signed with the New York Mets. He began the season with the Binghamton Rumble Ponies and was promoted to the Las Vegas 51s after one game.

Gagnon was called up to the Mets on July 10, 2018. In 17 starts for Las Vegas prior to his promotion, he was 1–4 with a 4.67 ERA and a 1.26 WHIP. Gagnon made his Major League debut in a July 10 start against the Philadelphia Phillies at Citi Field. He allowed six earned runs in 4 2/3 innings and hit a sacrifice fly. Coincidentally, the starting pitcher for the Phillies in that game was Enyel De Los Santos, who was also making his Major League debut and earned the win for New York.

Gagnon was designated for assignment by the Mets on November 20, 2019, in order for him to pursue an opportunity in Korea.

=== Kia Tigers ===
On December 10, 2019, Gagnon signed a one-year, $850,000 deal with the Kia Tigers of the KBO League. He became a free agent following the season.

=== Wei Chuan Dragons ===
On December 26, 2020, Gagnon signed with the Wei Chuan Dragons of the Chinese Professional Baseball League for the 2021 season. On April 8, 2021, Gagnon made his CPBL debut.

In 2023, Gagnon made 30 starts for Wei Chuan, posting a 13–7 record and 3.00 ERA with 155 strikeouts across 183 innings of work. Following the season, he was named the CPBL MVP award winner.

On February 6, 2024, Gagnon re-signed with the Dragons on a two–year contract. In 21 games (20 starts) for Wei Chuan, he compiled a 10–8 record and 2.98 ERA with 87 strikeouts across 120 2/3 innings pitched. Following the season, Gagnon was named a CPBL Gold Glove Award winner.

Gagnon made 20 starts for the Dragons during the 2025 season, compiling an 11-5 record and 2.77 ERA with 120 strikeouts over 146 innings of work.

On December 11, 2025, Gagnon re-signed with the Dragons one a one-year contract.
