= Jacob Nottingham =

American baseball player (born 1995)

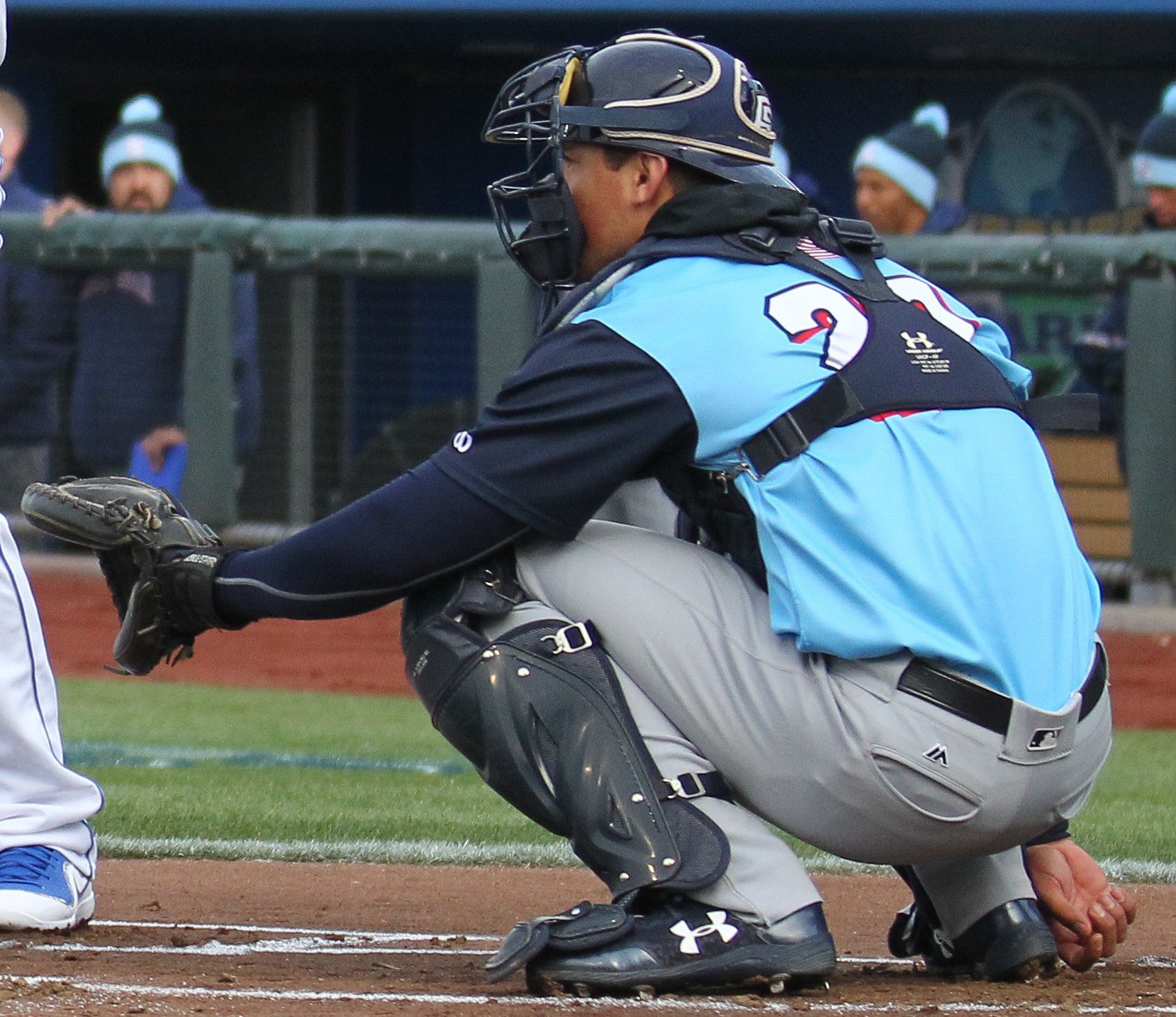
- Nottingham catching for the Colorado Springs Sky Sox in 2018
- Catcher
- Born: April 3, 1995 (age 31); Redlands, California, U.S.
- Batted: Right Threw: Right

MLB debut
- April 16, 2018, for the Milwaukee Brewers

Last MLB appearance
- June 6, 2021, for the Seattle Mariners

MLB statistics
- Batting average: .184
- Home runs: 8
- Runs batted in: 23
- Stats at Baseball Reference

Teams
- Milwaukee Brewers (2018–2021); Seattle Mariners (2021)

Jacob Andrew Nottingham (born April 3, 1995) is an American former professional baseball catcher and first baseman. He played in Major League Baseball (MLB) for the Milwaukee Brewers and Seattle Mariners from 2018 to 2021.

== Playing career ==
=== Amateur career ===
Nottingham attended Redlands High School in Redlands, California. He accepted an offer to play college baseball at the University of Oklahoma.

=== Houston Astros ===
The Houston Astros selected him in the sixth round of the 2013 Major League Baseball draft. He made his professional debut that year with the Gulf Coast Astros, where he spent the whole season, batting .247 with one home run and 20 RBIs in 44 games. In 2014, he played for the Greeneville Astros, where he batted .230 with five home runs and 28 RBIs, and he started 2015 with the Quad Cities River Bandits. He was promoted to the Lancaster JetHawks in late June.

=== Oakland Athletics ===
Prior to the 2015 trade deadline, the Astros traded Nottingham and Daniel Mengden to the Oakland Athletics for Scott Kazmir. Oakland assigned him to the Stockton Ports, where he finished the season. In 119 total games between Quad City, Lancaster, and Stockton, Nottingham batted .316/.372/.505 with 17 home runs, 82 RBI, and an .877 OPS.

=== Milwaukee Brewers ===
On February 12, 2016, the Athletics traded Nottingham and Bubba Derby to the Milwaukee Brewers for Khris Davis. Nottingham spent 2016 with the Biloxi Shuckers where he hit .234 with 11 home runs and 37 RBIs. After the season, the Brewers assigned Nottingham to the Salt River Rafters of the Arizona Fall League. Nottingham returned to Biloxi in 2017 where he struggled, batting only .209 with nine home runs and 48 RBIs in 101 games. The Brewers added him to their 40-man roster after the 2017 season.

Nottingham began the 2018 season with the Colorado Springs Sky Sox of the Triple-A Pacific Coast League. The Brewers promoted him to the major leagues on April 16, 2018. Nottingham finished the year with 4 hits in 20 at-bats. With Colorado Springs, he hit .281/.347/.528.

He began the 2019 season with the San Antonio Missions, but was recalled from Triple-A on May 16, 2019. On May 17, in a game against the Atlanta Braves, he hit his first career home run. On the year, Nottingham only registered 6 at-bats, getting 2 hits including his first MLB home run off of Josh Tomlin of the Atlanta Braves. Nottingham appeared in a career-high 20 games in 2020, hitting .188/.278/.458 with career highs in home runs (4) and RBI (13) in 48 at-bats.

In the 2020–21 offseason, Nottingham underwent surgery on the radial collateral ligament on his left thumb. After spending the beginning of the 2021 season recovering from the surgery, he was designated for assignment by Milwaukee on April 22. On April 28, he was claimed off waivers by the Seattle Mariners. On May 1, the Mariners designated him for assignment. The next day, the Mariners traded him to the Brewers in exchange for cash considerations. The Brewers, who were dealing with injuries to starter Omar Narváez and backup Manny Piña, immediately added Nottingham to the active roster. In his first at-bat back with Milwaukee, he hit a solo home run off of Los Angeles Dodgers starter Julio Urías. In the 8th inning of the same game, he hit a two-run homer off of Mike Kickham, giving him his first career multi-homer game in his return to Milwaukee. On May 13, he was again designated for assignment by Milwaukee.

=== Seattle Mariners ===
On May 20, 2021, he was again claimed off waivers by the Seattle Mariners. Nottingham being claimed off waivers twice by the Mariners within a span of a month exposed a loophole which was closed by the Collective Bargaining Agreement (CBA) that resolved the 2021–22 MLB lockout. The new clause, in which a player can’t be claimed off waivers for a second time by the same ballclub within a season until each of the other teams have passed on him, is colloquially known as the Jacob Nottingham Rule. He was again designated for assignment by Seattle on June 8, after going 3-for-26 with 1 home run. He was outrighted to the Triple-A Tacoma Rainiers on June 12. He was released by the Mariners organization on September 21.

=== Baltimore Orioles ===
Nottingham signed a minor league contract with the Baltimore Orioles on December 8, 2021. He was assigned to the Triple-A Norfolk Tides to begin the season, where he spent all of 2022. In 89 games, Nottingham hit .229/.333/.425 with 15 home runs, 51 RBI, and 12 stolen bases in 15 attempts. He elected free agency on November 10, 2022.

=== Seattle Mariners (second stint) ===
On December 22, 2022, Nottingham signed a minor league deal with the Seattle Mariners. He played in 17 games for the Triple-A Tacoma Rainiers, hitting .200/.294/.450 with 4 home runs and 10 RBIs in 60 at bats.

=== San Francisco Giants ===
On May 25, 2023, Nottingham was traded to the San Francisco Giants. In 17 games for the Triple–A Sacramento River Cats, he batted .262/.360/.415 with 2 home runs and 9 RBI. Nottingham was released by the Giants organization on June 28.

=== Washington Nationals ===
On July 3, 2023, Nottingham signed a minor league contract with the Washington Nationals organization. In 19 games for the Triple–A Rochester Red Wings, he hit .194/.256/.403 with 4 home runs and 13 RBI. Nottingham was released by the Nationals on August 11.

=== Olmecas de Tabasco ===
On April 27, 2024, Nottingham signed with the Olmecas de Tabasco of the Mexican League. In 16 games for Tabasco, he hit .243/.333/.351 with one home run and seven RBI.

=== Charros de Jalisco ===
On June 20, 2024, Nottingham was loaned to the Charros de Jalisco of the Mexican League. In 28 games for Jalisco, he struggled to a .134/.226/.317 batting line with four home runs, 11 RBI, and one stolen base. Nottingham was released by the Charros on November 8.

=== Seattle Mariners (third stint) ===
On December 10, 2024, Nottingham signed a minor league contract with the Seattle Mariners. He made 17 appearances for the Triple-A Tacoma Rainiers in 2025, batting .193/.277/.298 with seven RBI and four walks. Nottingham elected free agency following the season on November 6, 2025.

On March 1, 2026, Nottingham re-signed with the Mariners organization on a new minor league contract.

== Coaching career ==
On March 9, 2026, despite signing with the Mariners as a player the week prior, it was announced that Nottingham would spend the 2026 season as a minor league coach within the organization.

== Personal life ==
Nottingham's grandmother and aunt both died of amyotrophic lateral sclerosis. He has a tattoo of them being watched over by Lou Gehrig on his left arm.
