= Justin Yeager =

Free agent
- Pitcher
- Born: January 20, 1998 (age 28); Woodridge, Illinois, U.S.
- Bats: Left Throws: Right
- Stats at Baseball Reference

Justin Richard Yeager (born January 20, 1998) is an American professional baseball pitcher who is a free agent.

== Career ==
Yeager attended Plainfield North High School and Southern Illinois University, where he played college baseball for the Southern Illinois Salukis. The Atlanta Braves selected Yeager in the 33rd round (997th overall) of the 2019 Major League Baseball draft. He split his first professional season between the rookie-level Gulf Coast League Braves and Danville Braves. Yeager did not play in a game in 2020 due to the cancellation of the minor league season because of the COVID-19 pandemic.

Yeager returned to action in 2021 with the Single-A Augusta GreenJackets and High-A Rome Braves. In 30 appearances for the two affiliates, he posted a cumulative 7-3 record and 2.93 ERA with 60 strikeouts and five saves over 40 innings of work. Yeager split the 2022 season between Rome and the Double-A Mississippi Braves, accumulating a 1-0 record and 3.10 ERA with 81 strikeouts and nine saves across 49 relief appearances.

On December 12, 2022, the Braves sent Yeager to the Milwaukee Brewers in a three-team trade in which the Braves acquired Sean Murphy, the Brewers also acquired William Contreras, and Joel Payamps, and the Athletics acquired Manny Piña, Esteury Ruiz, Kyle Muller, Freddy Tarnok, and Royber Salinas. Yeager made three scoreless appearances for the Double-A Biloxi Shuckers in 2023, but missed the majority of the season due to an injury.

Yeager returned to Biloxi in 2024, compiling a 3-6 record and 3.88 ERA with 56 strikeouts and 20 saves in 51 innings pitched across 47 appearances out of the bullpen. He made 49 appearances split between Biloxi and the Triple-A Nashville Sounds in 2025, registering a cumulative 3-3 record and 2.04 ERA with 50 strikeouts and 10 saves across 57 1/3 innings pitched. Yeager elected free agency following the season on November 6, 2025.

On February 4, 2026, Yeager signed a minor league contract with the San Diego Padres. In 33 games of relief he threw 45.1 innings struggling mightily going 1-5 with a 8.74 ERA, 39 strikeouts and one save. He was released on August 1.

On August 5, 2026, Yeager signed a minor league contract with the Tampa Bay Rays. He elected free agency on November 2.
