= Erik Kratz =

American baseball player (born 1980)

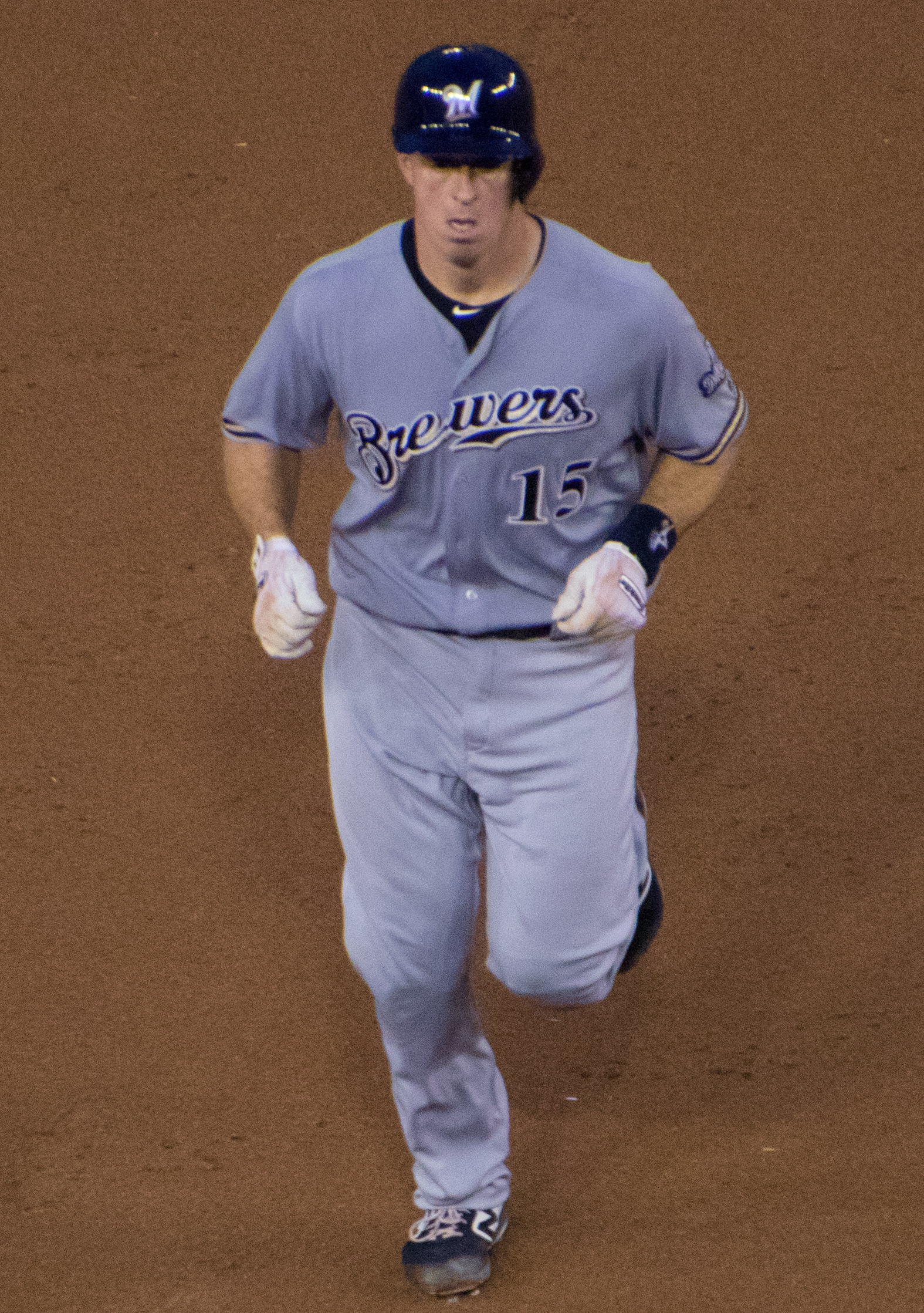
- Kratz with the Milwaukee Brewers in 2018
- Catcher
- Born: June 15, 1980 (age 46); Telford, Pennsylvania, U.S.
- Batted: Right Threw: Right

MLB debut
- July 17, 2010, for the Pittsburgh Pirates

Last MLB appearance
- September 23, 2020, for the New York Yankees

MLB statistics
- Batting average: .209
- Home runs: 31
- Runs batted in: 105
- Stats at Baseball Reference

Teams
- Pittsburgh Pirates (2010); Philadelphia Phillies (2011–2013); Toronto Blue Jays (2014); Kansas City Royals (2014–2015); Philadelphia Phillies (2015); Houston Astros (2016); Pittsburgh Pirates (2016); New York Yankees (2017); Milwaukee Brewers (2018); San Francisco Giants (2019); Tampa Bay Rays (2019); New York Yankees (2020)

Career highlights and awards
- WBSC Premier12 All-World Team (2019)

Erik Floyd Kratz (born June 15, 1980) is an American former professional baseball catcher who played for the Pittsburgh Pirates, Philadelphia Phillies, Toronto Blue Jays, Kansas City Royals, Houston Astros, Milwaukee Brewers, San Francisco Giants, Tampa Bay Rays, and New York Yankees during an 11-year career. Kratz was drafted by the Toronto Blue Jays in the 29th round of the 2002 Major League Baseball draft.

After playing with minor league affiliates of the Blue Jays for seven years, from 2002 through 2008, Kratz signed a minor league contract with the Pittsburgh Pirates in 2009. He made his big league debut for the Pirates on July 17, 2010, starting as catcher and going 2-5 with 1 RBI. Before the 2011 season, Kratz signed a minor-league deal with the Philadelphia Phillies. He played with the Triple-A Lehigh Valley IronPigs, appearing several times in 2011 and 2012 at the Major-League level and ultimately winning the backup catcher job on the Phillies' 2013 roster.

Kratz was dealt back to the Toronto organization prior to the 2014 season, and divided his playing time between MLB and the Blue Jays’ Triple-A Buffalo Bisons farm team before being traded to the Kansas City Royals in July. He returned to the Phillies in 2015, and played for the Houston Astros and Pirates in 2016. Kratz played for the New York Yankees in 2017. He was traded to the Milwaukee Brewers in 2018, and played for the San Francisco Giants and Tampa Bay Rays in 2019. He finished his career with the Yankees in 2020.

== Early life ==
Kratz graduated from Christopher Dock Mennonite High School in Lansdale, Pennsylvania, and Eastern Mennonite University (EMU) in Harrisonburg, Virginia, where he earned a degree in business administration. While playing college baseball for the Eastern Mennonite Royals (1999–2002), Kratz caught every at bat (AB) for every game he played in and was named the Old Dominion Athletic Conference Player of the Year twice. In his senior year, he batted .507/.563/.993, with 25 doubles, one triple, 14 home runs, and 59 runs batted in (RBI), in 142 AB, and broke the NCAA Division III record for doubles in a career.

== Professional career ==
=== Toronto Blue Jays ===
Kratz was selected by the Blue Jays in the 29th round, the 866th overall pick, of the 2002 MLB draft. He was the first player to be drafted out of Division III Eastern Mennonite University.

After the draft, Kratz worked his way up through the minor leagues over the course of three years with the Medicine Hat Blue Jays, Auburn Doubledays, Charleston AlleyCats, New Haven Ravens, and Dunedin Blue Jays. He then played the 2005 season with the New Hampshire Fisher Cats, the Blue Jays’ Double-A affiliate. There, Kratz batted .205/.283/.353, with 11 home runs, and 34 RBI. From 2006 to 2008, Kratz alternated between the Fisher Cats and the Triple-A Syracuse Chiefs. In 2006, he batted a combined .228/.294/.339, with 7 home runs, and 34 RBI; in 2007, he batted a combined .235/.299/.449, with 13 home runs, and 49 RBI; in 2008, he batted a combined .239/.313/.506 with 16 home runs, and 43 RBI. On June 9, 2008, he was named the International League (IL) Player of the Week.

=== Pittsburgh Pirates ===
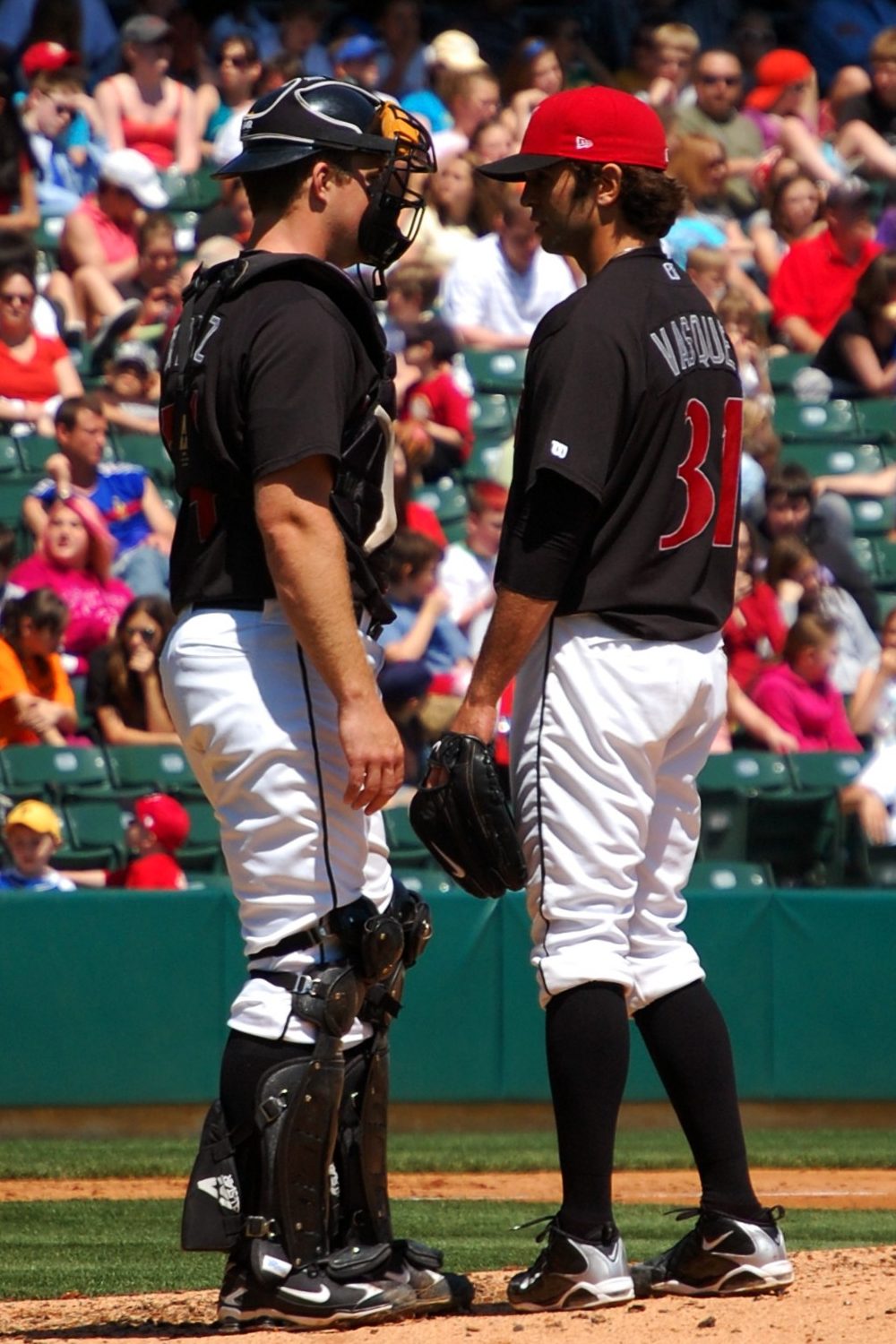
Kratz (left) with Virgil Vasquez in 2009

In 2009, Kratz signed with the Pirates, who were in need of a primary Triple-A catcher after the call-up of Robinzon Diaz to replace the injured Ryan Doumit. Kratz played the 2009 season with the Indianapolis Indians and finished batting .273/.337/.470, with 11 home runs, and 43 RBI. He was named an IL Mid-Season All-Star, the IL Triple-A All-Star Game Top Star (on July 15), and an IL Post-Season All-Star (on September 1).

Kratz began the 2010 season with Indianapolis and finished his minor league season batting .274/.380/.496, with 9 home runs, and 41 RBI. On July 14, he was named an IL Mid-Season All-Star for the second time. On July 12, the Pirates optioned catcher Jason Jaramillo to Triple-A Indianapolis and the team announced Kratz would be called up to replace him.

Kratz made his MLB debut on July 17, 2010, against the Houston Astros. He recorded his first MLB hit against Astros starter Bud Norris, and drove in his first MLB run later in the game.

=== Philadelphia Phillies ===
Kratz signed a minor league deal with the Philadelphia Phillies prior to the 2011 season. He spent the season with their Triple-A affiliate Lehigh Valley IronPigs, in Allentown. Kratz did well there, batting .288/.372/.466, with 15 home runs, and 53 RBI. On July 13, he won his third International League Mid-Season All-Star award. Kratz was called up to MLB on September 16, and went on to play two games with the Phillies, recording two hits in six at bats.

Kratz opened the 2012 season with Lehigh Valley, but had several stints on the Phillies' active roster. He hit his first MLB career home run on May 22, a solo shot against Washington Nationals pitcher Tom Gorzelanny that landed in the center field bushes at Citizens Bank Park. Playing initially as a pinch hitter to replace the injured Jim Thome, Kratz later assumed a catching job following injuries to backup catcher Brian Schneider and All-Star starter Carlos Ruiz. Kratz quickly began producing offensively, registering a 1.395 OPS in his first 16 games. Ultimately, he hit .248/.306/.504, with 9 home runs, in 50 games, and 141 at bats.

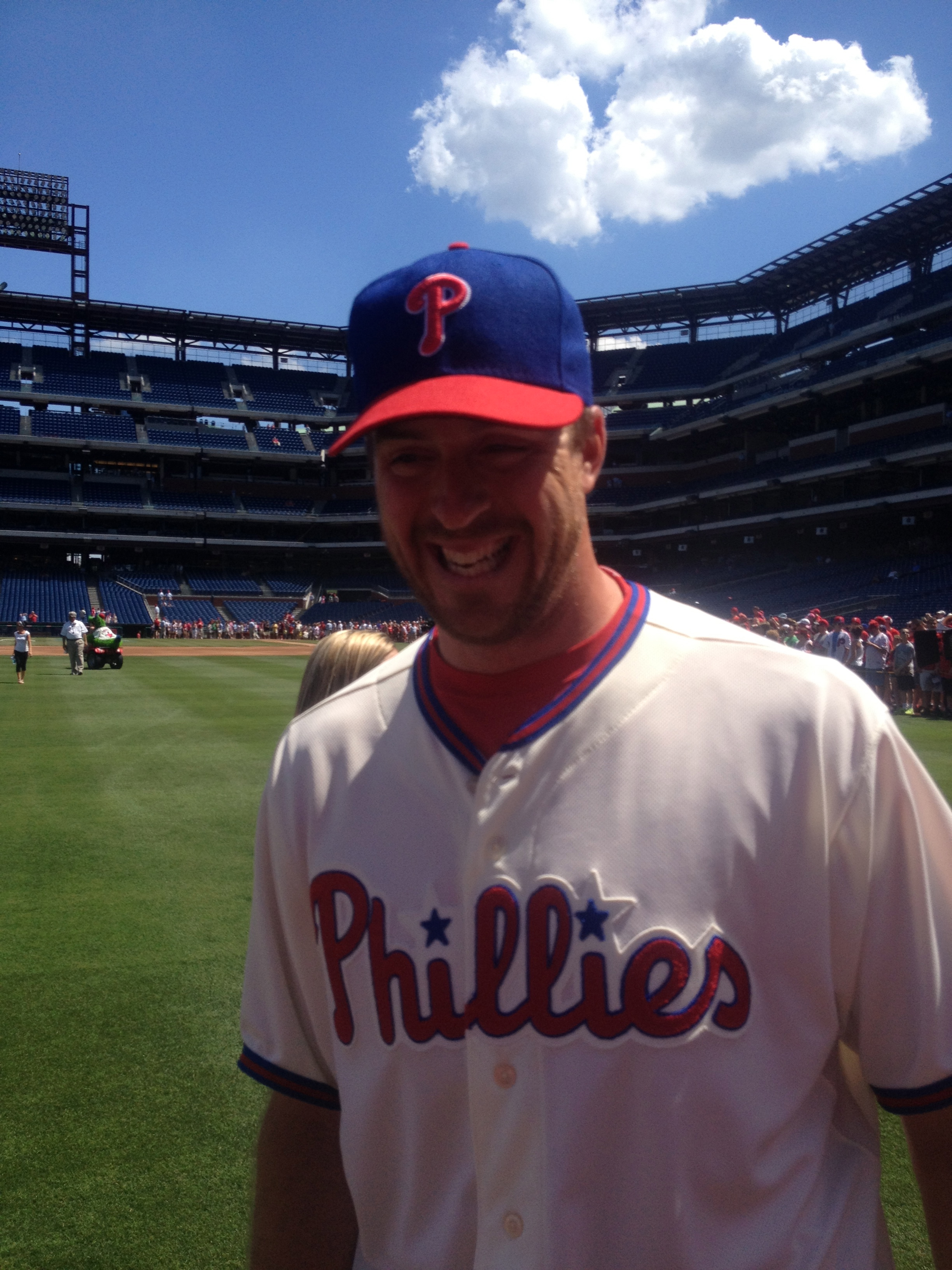
Kratz playing for the Philadelphia Phillies in 2013

Kratz made his first MLB Opening Day roster with the Phillies in 2013. He served as the team's primary catcher while Ruiz served a 25-day drug suspension, but was placed on the disabled list on June 9 with a torn medial meniscus and underwent surgery. Kratz returned to the club on July 21, and continued as backup catcher thereafter. He finished the season batting .213/.280/.386, with 42 hits, 9 home runs, and 26 RBI.

=== Toronto Blue Jays (second stint) ===
On December 3, 2013, Kratz, along with pitcher Rob Rasmussen, was traded to the Toronto Blue Jays for pitcher Brad Lincoln. Kratz had a strong spring, batting .400 before being demoted to minor-league camp in favor of Josh Thole.

On March 30, Kratz was recalled from Triple-A after Casey Janssen was placed on the disabled list. Kratz appeared in six games for the Blue Jays before being optioned to the Triple-A Buffalo Bisons to make room for J. A. Happ. Kratz was later recalled and played in 34 games with the Blue Jays, batting .198, with 3 home runs, and 10 RBI before being traded. With Buffalo, he batted .299/.354/.517.

=== Kansas City Royals ===
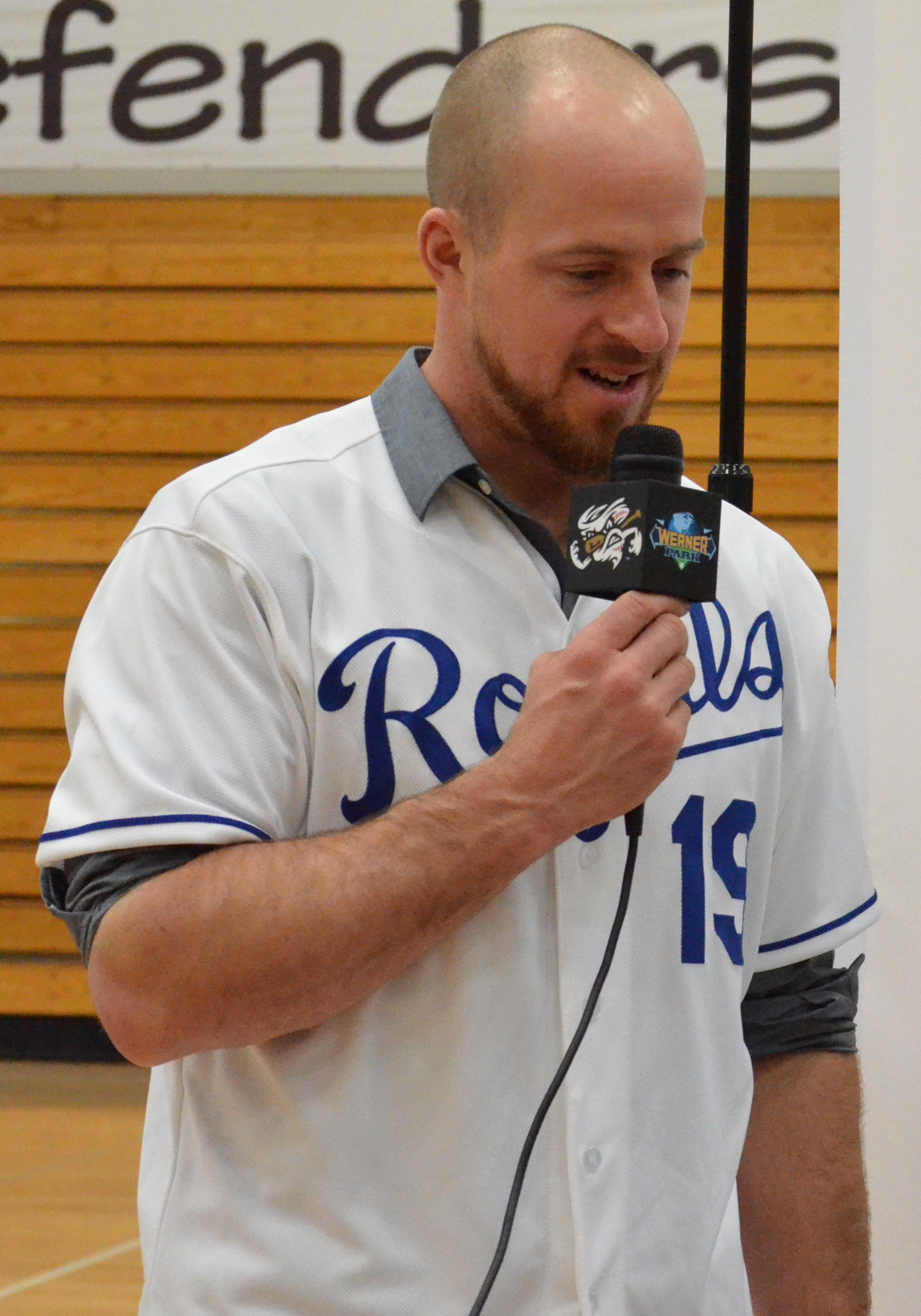
Kratz while with the Kansas City Royals in 2015

On July 28, 2014, Kratz was traded with Liam Hendriks to the Kansas City Royals in exchange for Danny Valencia. He had his first career multi-homer game on August 18 in a 6-4 win over the Minnesota Twins. Kratz batted .276/.290/.517 in 29 at bats for KC.

On June 11, 2015, after four at bats with the Royals, Kratz was designated for assignment.

=== Boston Red Sox ===
On June 21, 2015, Kratz was claimed off waivers by the Boston Red Sox. He was designated for assignment on June 25, and elected free agency on June 29.

=== Seattle Mariners ===
Kratz signed a minor league deal with the Seattle Mariners on July 2, 2015. He was released on July 15.

=== Philadelphia Phillies (second stint) ===
On July 17, 2015, Kratz signed a minor league contract with the Philadelphia Phillies. He slashed .312/.433/.558 for the Triple–A Lehigh Valley IronPigs across 77 at–bats. Kratz was added to the Phillies' active roster on September 1 and made his first appearance the following day, hitting a pinch–hit, two–run double against Matt Harvey of the New York Mets. In 12 games for Philadelphia, he batted .227/.261/.318 with no home runs and two RBI. On October 7, Kratz was removed from the 40–man roster and sent outright to Lehigh Valley.

=== Houston Astros ===
On December 11, 2015, Kratz signed a minor league contract with the San Diego Padres.

On March 28, 2016, Kratz was traded to the Houston Astros for pitcher Dan Straily. On April 26, he was pressed into service as a pitcher during a blowout with the Astros. After 29 at–bats, Kratz was designated for assignment on May 16 and released on May 22.

=== Los Angeles Angels ===
On May 27, 2016, Kratz agreed to a minor league contract with the Los Angeles Angels. He had 39 at bats for their Triple–A team, the Salt Lake Bees.

=== Pittsburgh Pirates (second stint) ===
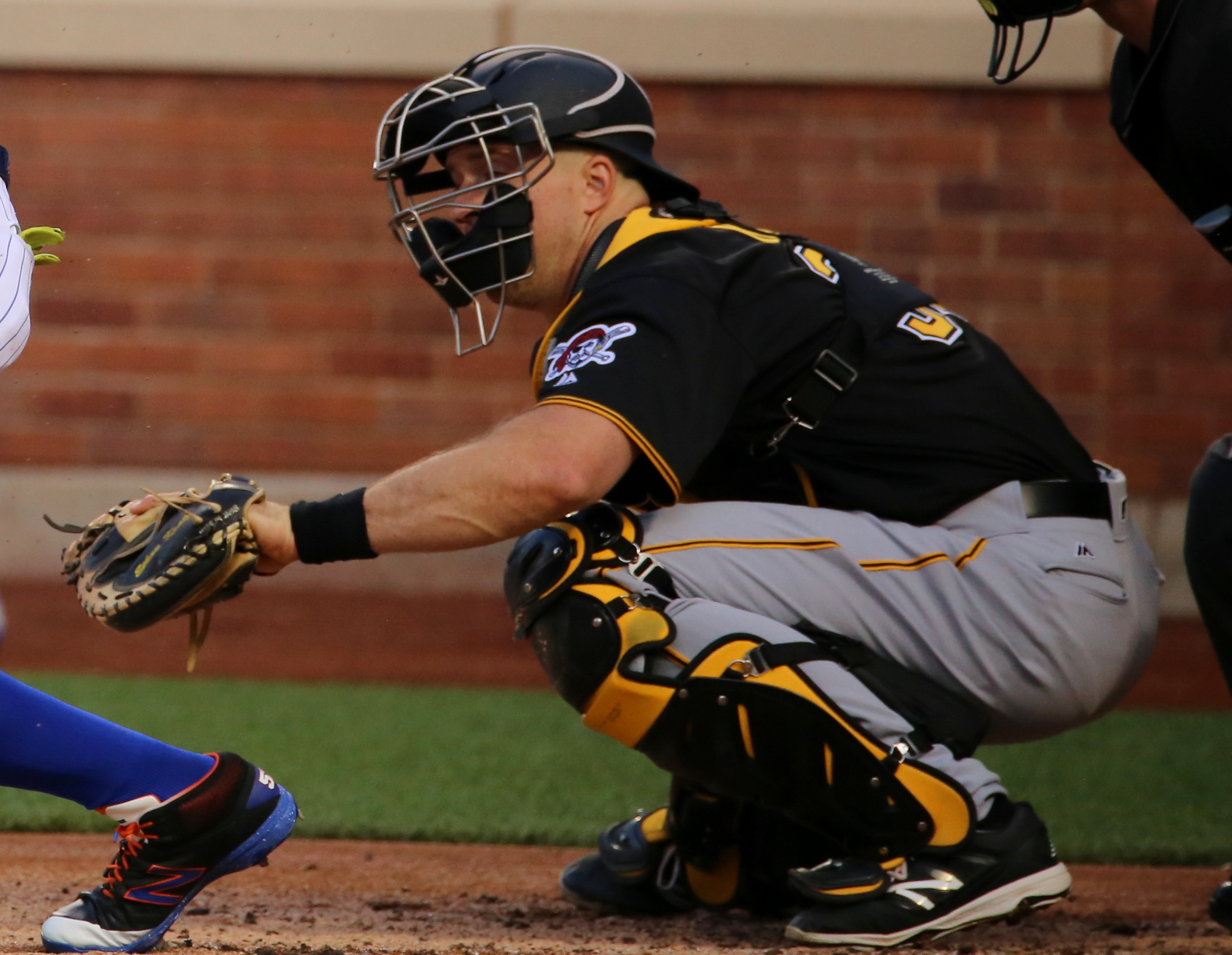
Kratz with the Pittsburgh Pirates in 2016

On June 11, 2016, Kratz was traded to the Pittsburgh Pirates, who added him to their 40-man roster. On June 21, he became the first player since 1879 to pitch and catch for two different major league teams in a single year. He tossed a scoreless inning while forced into relief for the Pirates in a 15-4 loss to the Giants. Kratz allowed two hits and struck out Brandon Belt for his first out of the inning. After 56 at bats, Kratz was designated for assignment on July 19, and elected free agency on July 22.

=== Toronto Blue Jays (third stint) ===
On July 28, 2016, Kratz signed a minor league contract with the Toronto Blue Jays organization. In 19 games with the Triple–A Buffalo Bisons, Kratz hit .155 with one RBI. Kratz elected free agency following the season on November 7.

=== Cleveland Indians ===
On December 1, 2016, Kratz signed a minor league contract with the Cleveland Indians. With their Triple–A team, the Columbus Clippers, he batted .270/.359/.472, with 13 home runs and 37 RBI, in 282 at bats.

=== New York Yankees ===
The Indians sold Kratz to the New York Yankees on August 31, 2017. The Yankees promoted him to the major leagues the next day. Kratz appeared in his first game for the Yankees as a pinch hitter, on September 10, hitting a two-RBI double. For the 2017 Yankees regular season, he had two hits in two at bats. Kratz declined an outright assignment to Triple-A at the start of November 2017, and became a free agent. On December 13, he signed a minor league contract with the Yankees. In 2018, playing for the team's AAA affiliate in Scranton/Wilkes-Barre, Kratz batted .269/.356/.538 in 52 at bats.

=== Milwaukee Brewers ===
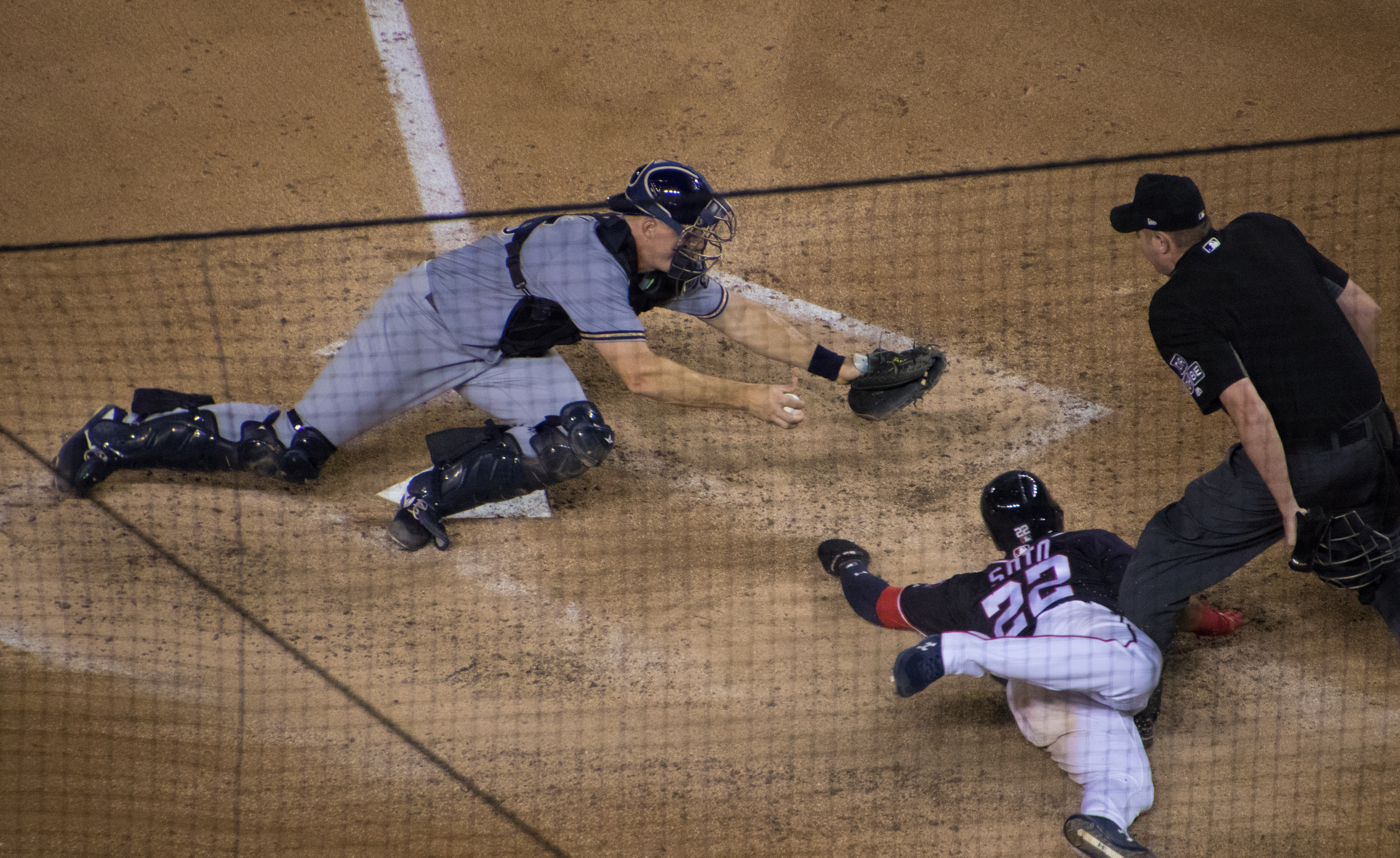
Kratz playing for the Milwaukee Brewers in 2018

The Yankees traded Kratz to the Milwaukee Brewers on May 25, 2018, in exchange for a player to be named later or cash considerations. He hit his first home run of the season the next day in his Brewers debut, off of AJ Ramos of the Mets. On June 16, the Yankees received Wendell Rijo to complete the trade. During the regular season, Kratz hit .236/.280/.355, with 6 homers, and 23 RBI, in a career-high 219 plate appearances. In the NLDS against the Rockies, he went 5-for-7 with 2 RBI, including a 3-hit game in the series-clinching Game 3, and was the oldest player to make his postseason debut since Lave Cross of the 1905 Philadelphia Athletics. As of September 2018, Kratz had played for 30 minor league teams, and 11 major league franchises, in 17 seasons.

=== San Francisco Giants ===
On March 24, 2019, Kratz was traded to the San Francisco Giants in exchange for C.J. Hinojosa. He was the 3rd-oldest player in the NL. Kratz batted .222 in 32 at bats, and was designated for assignment on May 13.

=== Tampa Bay Rays ===
On May 16, 2019, Kratz was traded to the Tampa Bay Rays in exchange for minor league pitcher Matt Seelinger. Kratz had one hit for the Rays in 17 at bats over six games. He was the 4th-oldest player in the AL. On May 31, Kratz was designated for assignment and received his release shortly afterward.

=== New York Yankees (second stint) ===
On June 8, 2019, Kratz signed a minor league deal with the Yankees. He batted .299/.375/.500, with 7 home runs, and 31 RBI, in 154 at-bats for the Triple–A Scranton/Wilkes-Barre RailRiders. Kratz elected free agency following the season on November 4.

Kratz re-signed with the Yankees on a minor league contract for the 2020 season. He was called up to the Yankees on August 8 after an injury to Kyle Higashioka. During a pre-game interview in early September, Kratz became emotional when asked about his influence and role in helping young pitchers, particularly Latin pitchers develop their game and succeed at the major league level. Kratz said "I love seeing what they can do... I think sometimes some people forget where they come from, some people forget that they want (to succeed) just as badly, and there's people back home who want it just as badly for them."

In 2020, Kratz was the third-oldest player in MLB at age 39.

On November 6, 2020, Kratz announced his retirement in a video posted to Google and his Twitter account.

== International career ==
On October 10, 2019, he was selected for the United States national baseball team in the 2019 WBSC Premier12. In the tournament, he batted .381/.435/.714, with two home runs, and three RBI, in 21 at bats. Kratz was named the best catcher in the tournament.

== Post-playing career ==
In March 2021, Kratz was teaching baseball at a middle school near his hometown. In 2021 he said the Colorado Rockies team in the 2018 playoffs had been cheating using a "sign stealing" method. He made the allegation on YES Network that the system involved banging a Theragun on a metal bench. In March 2022, Kratz joined the Phillies radio broadcast team as a part-time color analyst. In July 2023, Kratz's experiences as a catcher (as well as other MLB backup catchers) was chronicled in The Tao of the Backup Catcher: Playing Baseball for the Love of the Game, co-written with bestselling author and sportswriter Tim Brown. Kratz now is a co-host on the YouTube Podcast "Foul Territory" with ex-MLB Network on air talent Scott Braun, and other MLB players such as Jason Kipnis and A.J. Pierzynski.

== Personal life ==
Kratz is a member of the Souderton, Pennsylvania Mennonite Church. Up until 2009, he worked a construction job in the winter to support his family. Kratz and wife Sarah have two sons and a daughter.

Kratz is now a host of the Foul Territory Podcast, alongside Scott Braun and A. J. Pierzynski.
