= Jett Bandy =

American baseball player (born 1990)

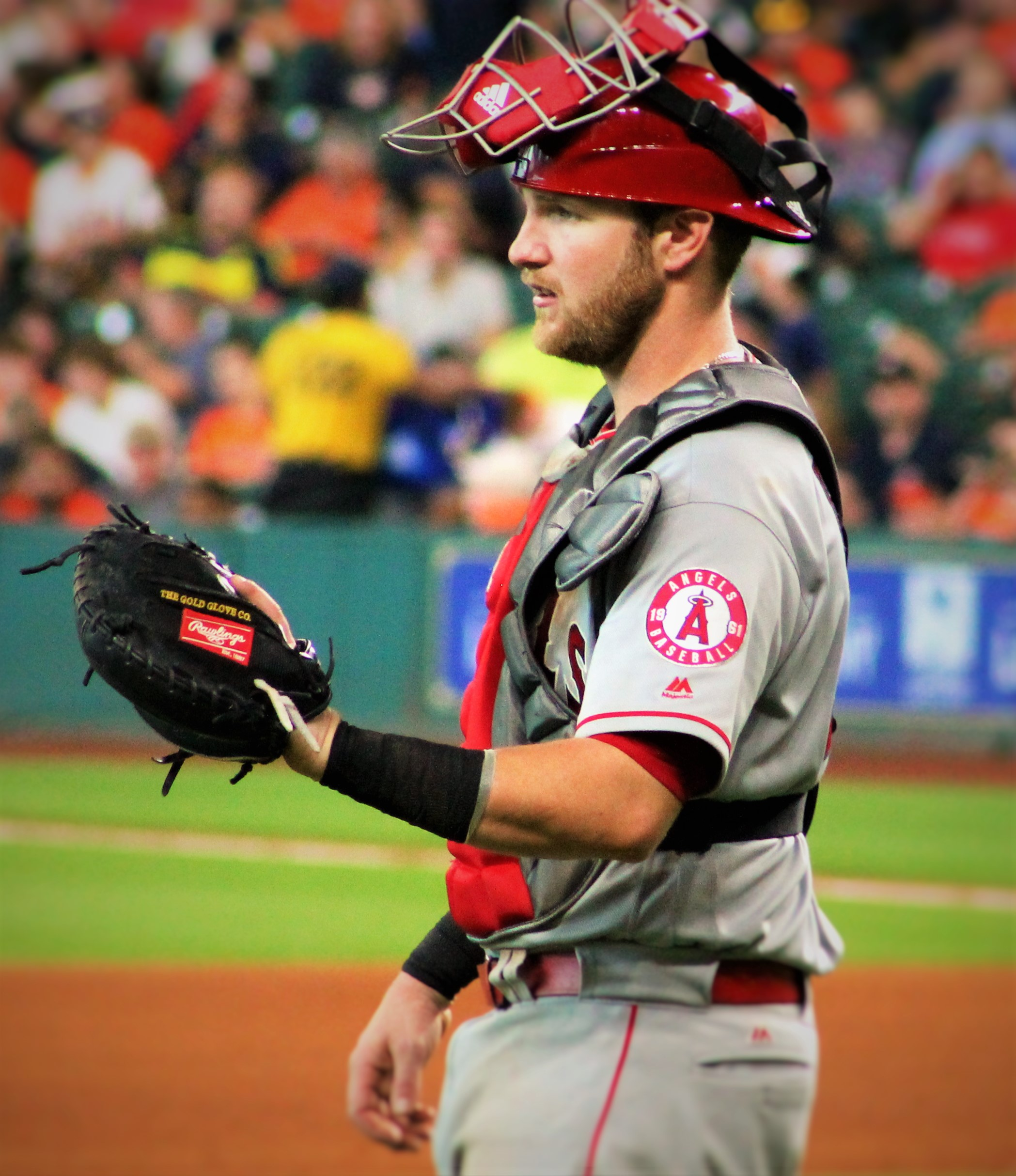
- Bandy with the Angels in 2016
- Catcher
- Born: March 26, 1990 (age 36); West Hills, California, U.S.
- Batted: Right Threw: Right

MLB debut
- September 14, 2015, for the Los Angeles Angels

Last appearance
- May 23, 2018, for the Milwaukee Brewers

MLB statistics
- Batting average: .218
- Home runs: 16
- Runs batted in: 45
- Stats at Baseball Reference

Teams
- Los Angeles Angels of Anaheim / Los Angeles Angels (2015–2016); Milwaukee Brewers (2017–2018)

Jett Adam Bandy (born March 26, 1990) is an American former professional baseball catcher. He played in Major League Baseball (MLB) for the Los Angeles Angels and Milwaukee Brewers.

== Early life ==
Jett Bandy was raised in Thousand Oaks, California, the second of four children. Bandy's first name is a portmanteau, after his father John, and grandfather Chet. John Bandy was responsible for teaching Tom Cruise flair bartending for the 1988 film Cocktail. Jett's mother is Sheryl.

Bandy first met his wife Sydney in 2012, while he was playing in the minor leagues.

== Career ==
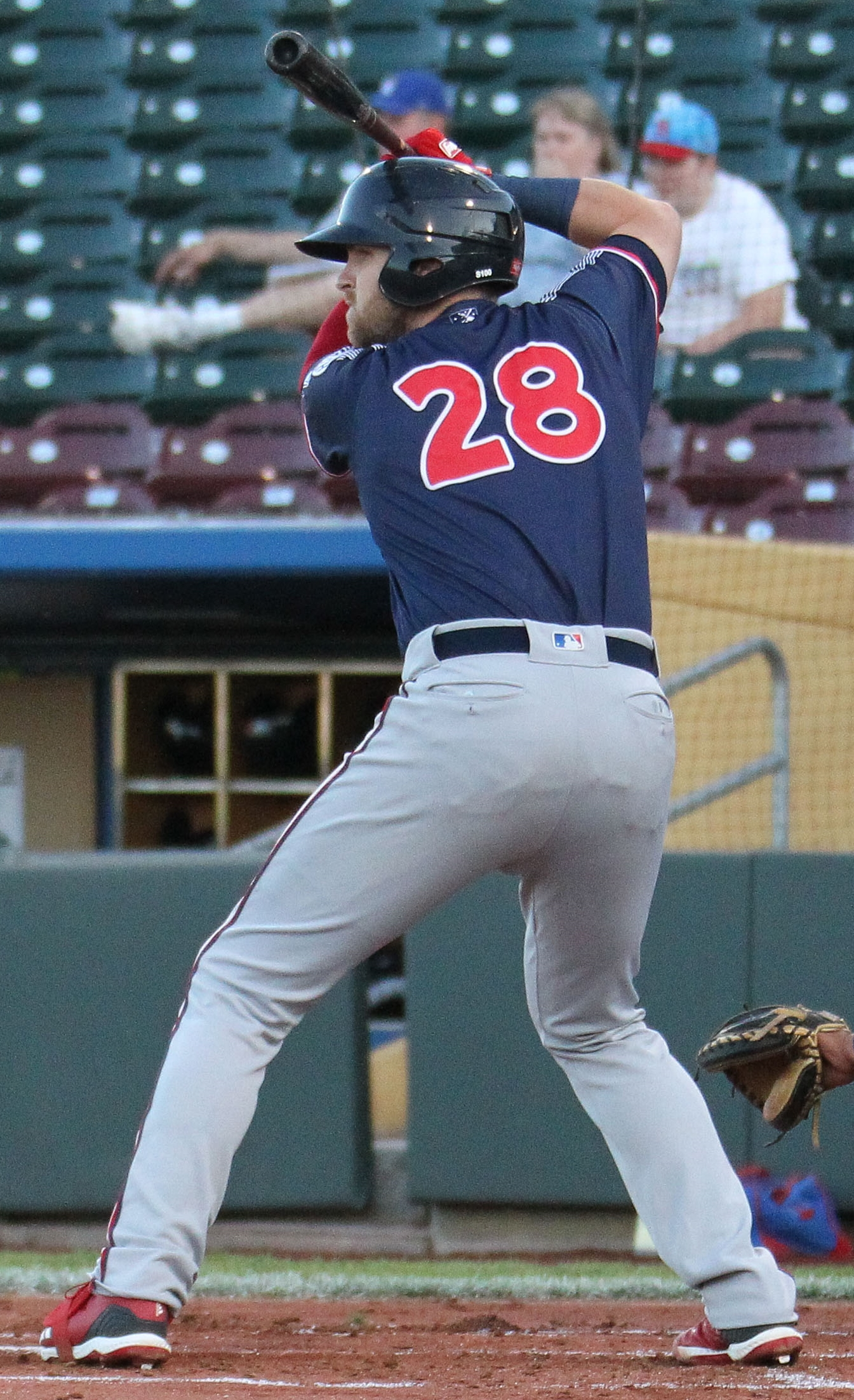
Bandy with the Nashville Sounds in 2019 as photographed by Nick Heath

=== Amateur ===
Bandy attended Thousand Oaks High School in Thousand Oaks, California. The Los Angeles Dodgers selected him in the 41st round of the 2008 Major League Baseball draft, but he did not sign. Bandy enrolled at University of Arizona, and played college baseball for the Arizona Wildcats. In 2010, he played collegiate summer baseball in the Cape Cod Baseball League for the Yarmouth-Dennis Red Sox.

=== Los Angeles Angels of Anaheim / Los Angeles Angels ===
The Los Angeles Angels of Anaheim selected Bandy in the 31st round of the 2011 MLB draft. He signed with the Angels and made his professional debut with the Arizona League Angels and also played for the Orem Owlz of the Pioneer League. He played for the Salt Lake Bees in 2011 and Inland Empire 66ers in 2012. Bandy played for the Double-A Arkansas Travelers in both 2013 and 2014.

Bandy made his Major League debut on September 14, 2015. In 2016, he batted .234/.281/.392 in 209 at bats.

=== Milwaukee Brewers ===
On December 13, 2016, Bandy was traded to the Milwaukee Brewers for Martín Maldonado and Drew Gagnon. He made the opening day roster, and began the 2017 season splitting playing time at catcher with Manny Piña. Following the acquisition of Stephen Vogt, formerly of the Oakland Athletics, and due in part to a recent slump, Bandy was optioned down to the Triple-A Colorado Springs Sky Sox on June 25. Bandy, however, was recalled from the Sky Sox after Vogt went on the disabled list for neck and leg injuries on July 17.

On May 25, 2018, Bandy was designated for assignment. On October 31, Bandy became a minor league free agent.

=== Texas Rangers ===
On November 7, 2018, Bandy signed a minor league contract with the Texas Rangers. He was assigned to the Triple-A Nashville Sounds for the 2019 season, hitting .231/.279/.430 with 13 home runs and 33 RBI. Bandy elected free agency following the season on November 4.

=== Boston Red Sox ===
On December 20, 2019, the Boston Red Sox signed Bandy to a minor league contract and invited him to spring training. He did not play in a game in 2020 due to the cancellation of the minor league season because of the COVID-19 pandemic. Bandy became a minor league free agent on November 2, 2020.

On February 22, 2021, Bandy re-signed with the Red Sox on a minor league contract and was invited to spring training. Bandy played in 34 games for the Triple–A Worcester Red Sox, hitting .208 with three home runs and 16 RBI. On September 11, Bandy was released by the Red Sox.
