= Hernán Pérez (baseball) =

Venezuelan baseball player (born 1991)

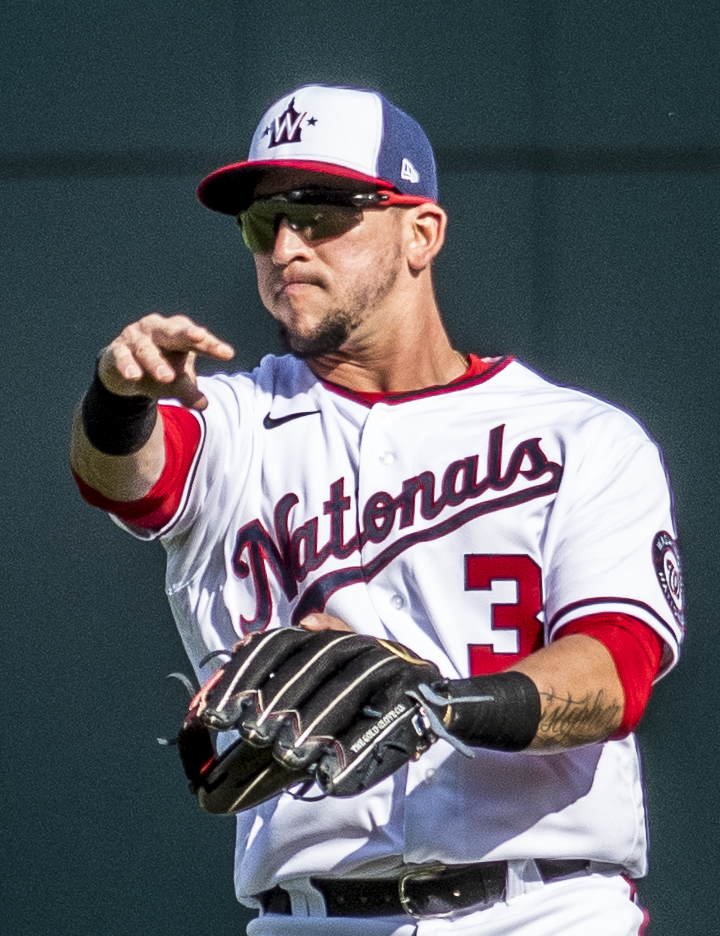
- Pérez with the Washington Nationals in 2021

Toros de Tijuana – No. 14
- Utility player
- Born: March 26, 1991 (age 35); Villa de Cura, Venezuela
- Bats: Right Throws: Right

Professional debut
- MLB: June 9, 2012, for the Detroit Tigers
- KBO: August 18, 2021, for the Hanwha Eagles

MLB statistics (through 2021 season)
- Batting average: .250
- Home runs: 45
- Runs batted in: 180

KBO statistics (through 2021 season)
- Batting average: .268
- Home runs: 5
- Runs batted in: 33
- Stats at Baseball Reference

Teams
- Detroit Tigers (2012–2015); Milwaukee Brewers (2015–2019); Chicago Cubs (2020); Washington Nationals (2021); Hanwha Eagles (2021)

Hernán Alejandro Pérez (born March 26, 1991) is a Venezuelan professional baseball utility player for the Toros de Tijuana of the Mexican League. He has previously played in Major League Baseball (MLB) for the Detroit Tigers, Milwaukee Brewers, Chicago Cubs, and Washington Nationals. He has also played in the KBO League for the Hanwha Eagles. Pérez was signed by the Tigers as a non-drafted free agent in 2007, and has seen time at every position on the field except for catcher.

== Early life ==
Pérez, was born in San Francisco de Asís, Aragua, Venezuela on March 26, 1991.

== Professional career ==
=== Detroit Tigers ===
After Pérez was signed by the Tigers, he was placed with the VSL Tigers of the Venezuelan Summer League In 2009, Pérez was promoted to the GCL Tigers of the Gulf Coast League. He was soon promoted to the West Michigan Whitecaps of the Midwest League. Later that season, he was promoted to the Class A-Advanced Lakeland Flying Tigers of the Florida State League. At the start of 2010, Pérez found himself back with the West Michigan Whitecaps for which he had spent the 2011 season. He was named a Mid-Season and Post-Season All-Star.

Pérez was called up to the Major Leagues by Detroit on June 9, 2012, after Jhonny Peralta went on paternity leave. Pérez made his debut that day, and got his first hit a day later. He was subsequently sent back to Lakeland so Peralta could rejoin the Tigers.

Pérez started the 2013 season with the Double-A Erie SeaWolves. Pérez was recalled to the Tigers on July 9, 2013, replacing Omar Infante who was placed on the disabled list. Pérez was sent back to Double-A's Erie, on August 2, 2013, to make room for the newly acquired José Iglesias. However, Pérez was recalled to the Tigers just three days later, after teammate Jhonny Peralta received a 50-game suspension due to his ties to the Biogenesis scandal. In 33 plate appearances for the Detroit Tigers during the 2015 season, Pérez was batting only .061 with just two hits, one walk, and no RBIs.

=== Milwaukee Brewers ===
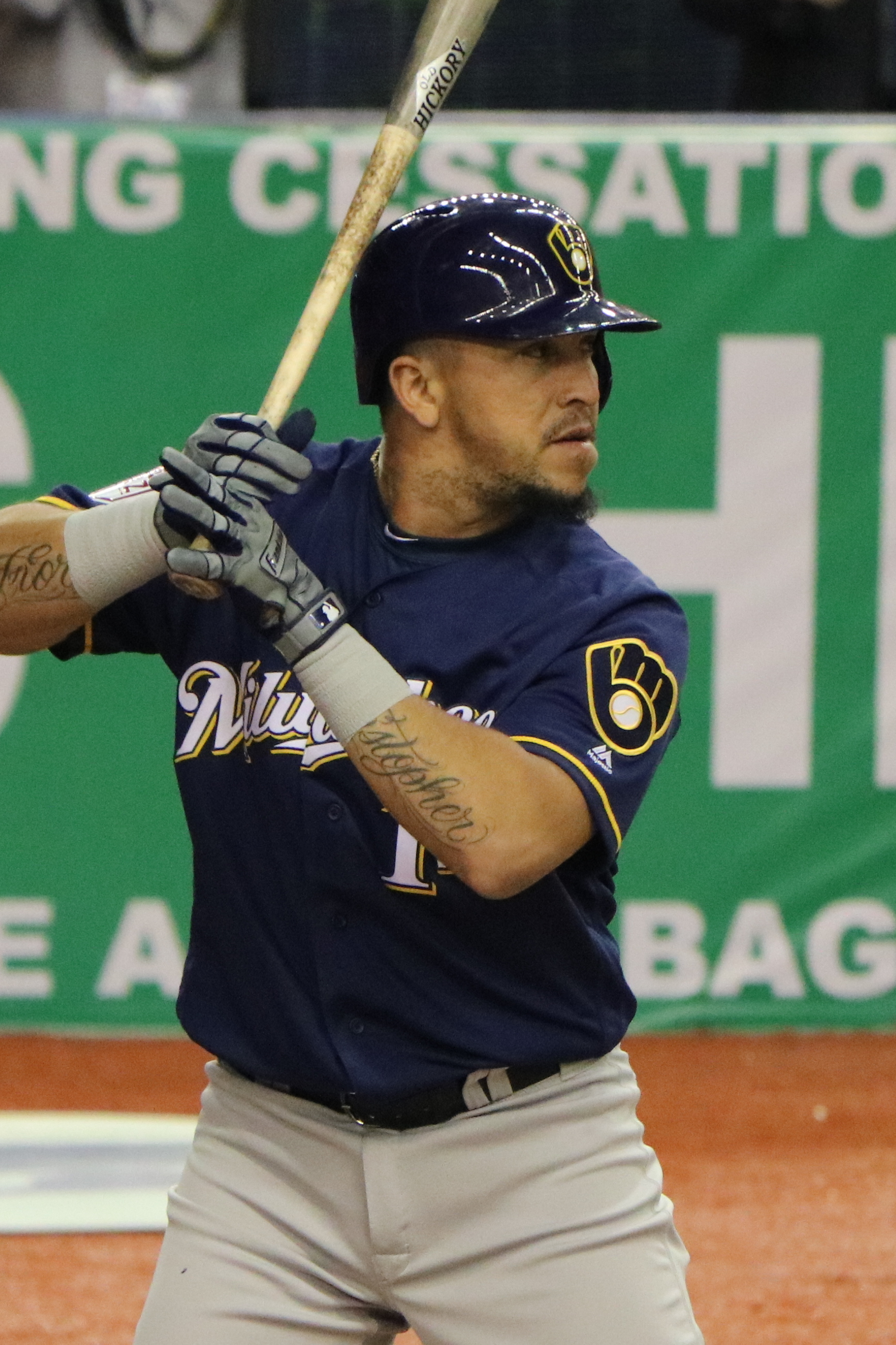
Pérez with the Brewers in 2019

On June 2, 2015, Pérez was claimed off waivers by the Milwaukee Brewers and activated the same day. Since joining the Brewers, Pérez has primarily been used as a utility player while appearing in at least 120 games during the 2016–2018 seasons. On June 28, 2019, Pérez was designated for assignment. Pérez was outrighted on July 3. Perez Returned to the Brewers when they optioned Travis Shaw to the minors and bought Hernan's minor league contract. He played shortstop that evening versus the Texas Rangers.

On October 16, 2019, Pérez was outrighted to the Brewers Triple-A affiliate, the San Antonio Missions. He opted free agency and left the team.

=== Chicago Cubs ===
On December 9, 2019, Pérez signed a minor league deal with the Chicago Cubs. On August 18, 2020, the Cubs selected Pérez to the active roster. Pérez was designated for assignment by the Cubs on August 31 after going 1-6 in 3 games for Chicago.

=== Washington Nationals ===
On January 21, 2021, Pérez signed a minor league contract with the Washington Nationals organization and was invited to Spring Training. Pérez made the Opening Day roster for the Nationals and had his contract selected on March 27. After getting 1 hit in 21 plate appearances across 10 games, on May 4, Pérez was designated for assignment by the Nationals. Pérez cleared waivers and elected free agency on May 6.

=== Milwaukee Brewers (second stint) ===
On May 7, 2021, Pérez signed a minor league contract with the Milwaukee Brewers organization and was assigned to the Triple-A Nashville Sounds. He was granted his release on July 4 so that he could join the Hanwha Eagles. In 23 games with Nashville, Pérez batted .357/.396/.536 with 3 home runs and 18 RBI.

=== Hanwha Eagles ===
On July 4, 2021, Pérez signed a $300K contract (with a $100K signing bonus) with the Hanwha Eagles of the KBO League. In 59 games, he slashed .268/.321/.411 with 5 home runs and 33 RBIs. Pérez was not re-signed for the 2022 season and became a free agent.

=== Toros de Tijuana ===
On April 9, 2022, Pérez signed with the Toros de Tijuana of the Mexican League. He appeared in 3 games, going 3 for 13 with 3 RBIs. Pérez was released by Tijuana on April 26, 2022, in order to pursue an opportunity with an affiliated organization.

=== Atlanta Braves ===
On April 27, 2022, Pérez signed a minor league deal with the Atlanta Braves. Pérez played in 86 games for the Triple-A Gwinnett Stripers, slashing .269/.318/.406 with 9 home runs, 39 RBI, and 20 stolen bases. He elected free agency following the season on November 10.

=== Minnesota Twins ===
On March 15, 2023, Pérez signed a minor league contract with the Minnesota Twins organization. In 69 games split between the Single–A Fort Myers Miracle and Triple–A St. Paul Saints, he hit a combined .276/.357/.471 with 10 home runs, 48 RBI, and 11 stolen bases. Pérez elected free agency following the season on November 6.

=== Cincinnati Reds ===
On December 11, 2023, Pérez signed a minor league contract with the Cincinnati Reds. In 82 appearances for the Triple-A Louisville Bats, he slashed .212/.275/.390 with 11 home runs, 44 RBI, and five stolen bases. Pérez elected free agency following the season on November 4, 2024.

=== Toros de Tijuana (second stint) ===
On March 12, 2025, Pérez signed with the Toros de Tijuana of the Mexican League. In 89 games he hit .312/.388/.556 with 19 home runs, 64 RBIs 14 stolen bases.

== World Baseball Classic ==
Pérez represented Venezuela in the 2017 World Baseball Classic and again in 2023.

== See also ==
- List of Major League Baseball players from Venezuela
