= Junior Guerra =

Venezuelan baseball player (born 1985)

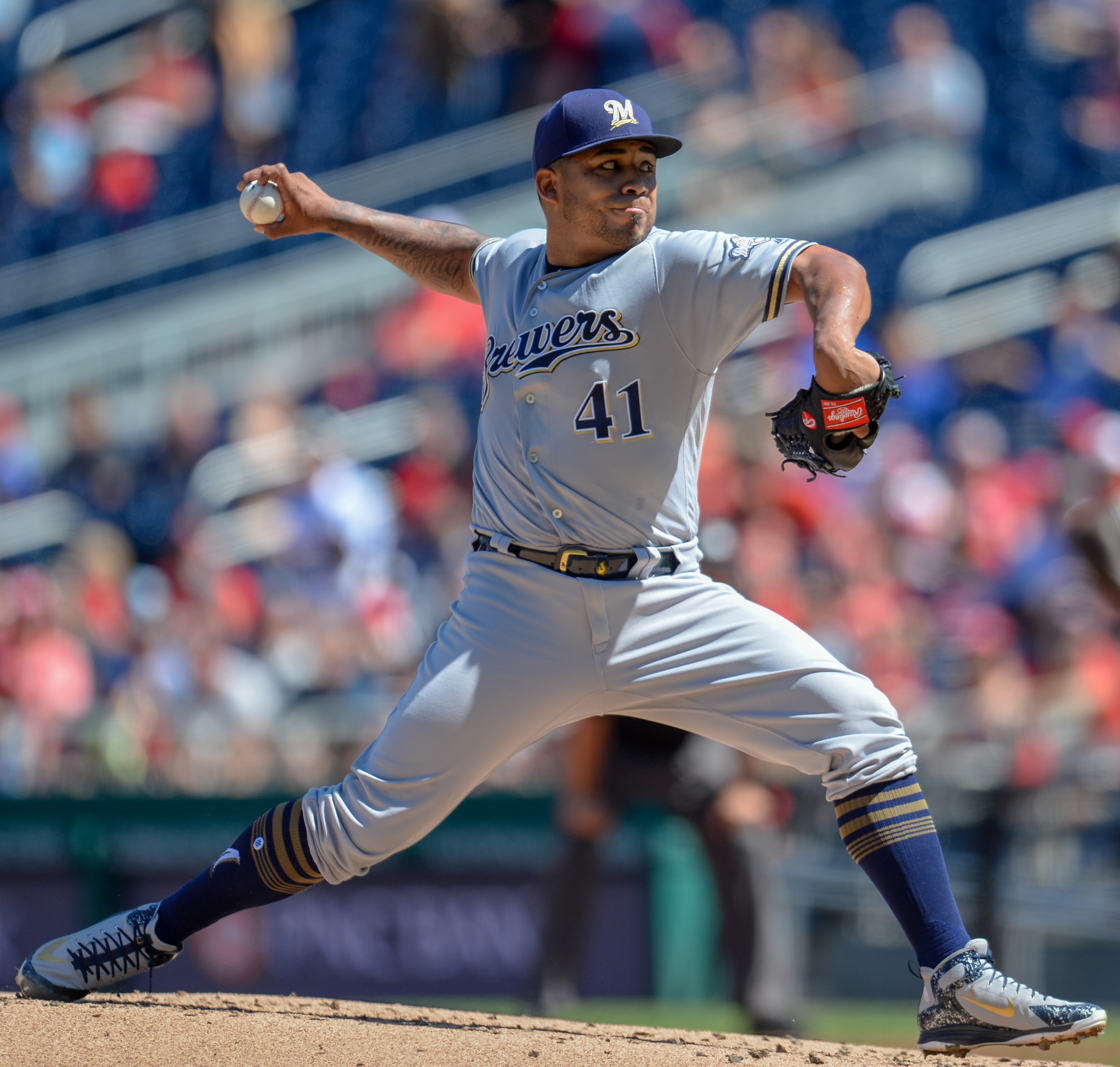
- Guerra with the Milwaukee Brewers in 2018

Conspiradores de Querétaro – No. 41
- Pitcher
- Born: January 16, 1985 (age 41); San Felix, Bolivar, Venezuela
- Bats: Right Throws: Right

MLB debut
- June 12, 2015, for the Chicago White Sox

MLB statistics (through 2021 season)
- Win–loss record: 31–25
- Earned run average: 4.06
- Strikeouts: 465
- Stats at Baseball Reference

Teams
- Chicago White Sox (2015); Milwaukee Brewers (2016–2019); Arizona Diamondbacks (2020); Los Angeles Angels (2021)

Junior José Guerra Maurera (born January 16, 1985) is a Venezuelan professional baseball pitcher for the Conspiradores de Querétaro of the Mexican League. He has previously played in Major League Baseball (MLB) for the Chicago White Sox, Milwaukee Brewers, Arizona Diamondbacks, and Los Angeles Angels. He was originally signed by the Atlanta Braves in 2001.

Guerra is notable for his development of a split-finger fastball, a pitch which he learned while playing in the Venezuelan Professional Baseball League and ultimately led to his 2015 rise to the MLB. Guerra said of the pitch in 2017, "I have no idea where I would be without it."

== Career ==
=== Early years ===
In October 2001, the Atlanta Braves signed the then 16 year old Guerra, as an international free agent out of Venezuela, to play as a catcher. After being converted to a pitcher in 2006, he was released by the Braves and signed with the New York Mets in 2008, where he gained traction but failed a PED test in 2009.

In 2010, he signed with Sant Boi of the Spanish División de Honor de Béisbol in Sant Boi de Llobregat. Guerra spent some time at first base en route to winning a championship in the league. The following season, Guerra returned to the United States where he played for the independent Wichita Wingnuts. He spent 2012 with the Leones de Yucatán of the Mexican League before returning to Wichita in 2013. In 2014, he pitched for San Marino of the Italian Baseball League, winning eight games and putting up an earned run average of 1.29 en route to winning the European Cup. Guerra played each winter from 2008 to 2015 with the Tiburones de La Guaira of the Venezuelan Professional Baseball League in order to stay on the radars of MLB scouts. Before the 2015 season, he signed a minor league contract with the Chicago White Sox.

=== Chicago White Sox ===
Guerra was called up to the majors for the first time on June 7, 2015. He made his major league debut a few days later on June 12, and pitched in a total of three games with the White Sox.

=== Milwaukee Brewers ===
On October 7, 2015, Guerra was claimed off waivers by the Milwaukee Brewers as the first roster move of general manager David Stearns. The Brewers chose to make him a starting pitcher rather than a reliever.

==== 2016 ====
Guerra experienced success in his first season with the Brewers, posting a 9–3 pitching record and a 2.81 ERA over 20 games. His rookie season, at the age of 31, resulted in accolades including the BBWAA naming Guerra the Brewers' Most Valuable Pitcher of 2016.

A shoulder injury kept Guerra out of play in August 2016 and forced him to skip winter league baseball in the 2016–17 offseason. Despite that, Guerra earned his spot in the rotation with a consistent 2016 season in the majors.

==== 2017 ====
On April 3, 2017, Guerra was the starting pitcher for the Brewers on Opening Day. He left after three innings with a strained right calf, an injury suffered while bunting in the 3rd inning.

Guerra did not return for the Brewers until late May and struggled to return to his 2016 form. He posted a 5.85 ERA in June, and was subsequently optioned to the minor leagues. Guerra returned but finished his season with a disappointing 1–4 record and career-worst 5.12 ERA in 21 games.

==== 2018 ====
The Brewers hoped Guerra could return to his 2016 season form for 2018, and Guerra did have mostly successful outings in 2018 at the beginning of the season. On May 30, 2018, Guerra pitched six shutout innings against the St. Louis Cardinals and allowed no walks. Guerra avoided the major injury problems that plagued him in prior seasons, appearing in a then-career best 31 games, but finished the 2018 campaign with a 6–9 record and a 4.09 ERA.

==== 2019 ====
Guerra was transitioned to a relief role for the 2019 season and led the National League in relief innings pitched at 83 2/3. Guerra appeared in 72 games for Milwaukee, securing a 9–5 record and 3.55 ERA, while also notching the first three saves of his career.

Guerra was non-tendered on December 2, 2019, and became a free agent.

=== Arizona Diamondbacks ===
On December 9, 2019, Guerra signed a one-year contract, with a club option, with the Arizona Diamondbacks. On July 5, 2020, it was announced that Guerra had tested positive for COVID-19. On November 20, 2020, Guerra was designated for assignment. On November 23, Guerra was released by the Diamondbacks. In 25 games for Arizona, he was 1–2 with a 3.04 ERA in 23 2/3 innings.

=== Los Angeles Angels ===
On January 30, 2021, Guerra signed a minor league contract with the Los Angeles Angels organization and was invited to Spring Training. On March 16, 2021, the Angels selected Guerra's contract to the 40-man roster. Guerra made 41 appearances for the Angels in 2021, struggling to a 6.06 ERA with 61 strikeouts in 65.1 innings pitched. He was designated for assignment following the season on November 16, 2021. He was released by the Angels three days later.

=== Tecolotes de los Dos Laredos ===
On March 8, 2022, Guerra signed with the Tecolotes de los Dos Laredos of the Mexican League. Guerra started 16 games for Dos Laredos in 2022, pitching to an 8–3 record and 3.56 ERA with 87 strikeouts in 83 1/3 innings of work. On February 3, 2023, Guerra was released by the team after undergoing elbow surgery.

On January 8, 2024, Guerra re–signed with the Tecolotes after a season of inactivity. In 20 games (18 starts) for the team, he posted a 7–5 record and 5.61 ERA with 76 strikeouts across 85 innings pitched.

In 2025, Guerra returned for a second consecutive season with Dos Laredos. In 19 starts he threw 105.2 innings going 5-3 with a 4.51 ERA and 93 strikeouts.

=== Conspiradores de Querétaro ===
On January 26, 2026, Guerra was loaned to the Conspiradores de Querétaro of the Mexican League.

== International career ==
Guerra pitched for Venezuela in the 2009 Baseball World Cup.

On October 29, 2018, he was selected to play for the MLB All-Stars at the 2018 MLB Japan All-Star Series.

== See also ==
- List of Major League Baseball players from Venezuela
