= Manny Piña =

Venezuelan baseball player (born 1987)

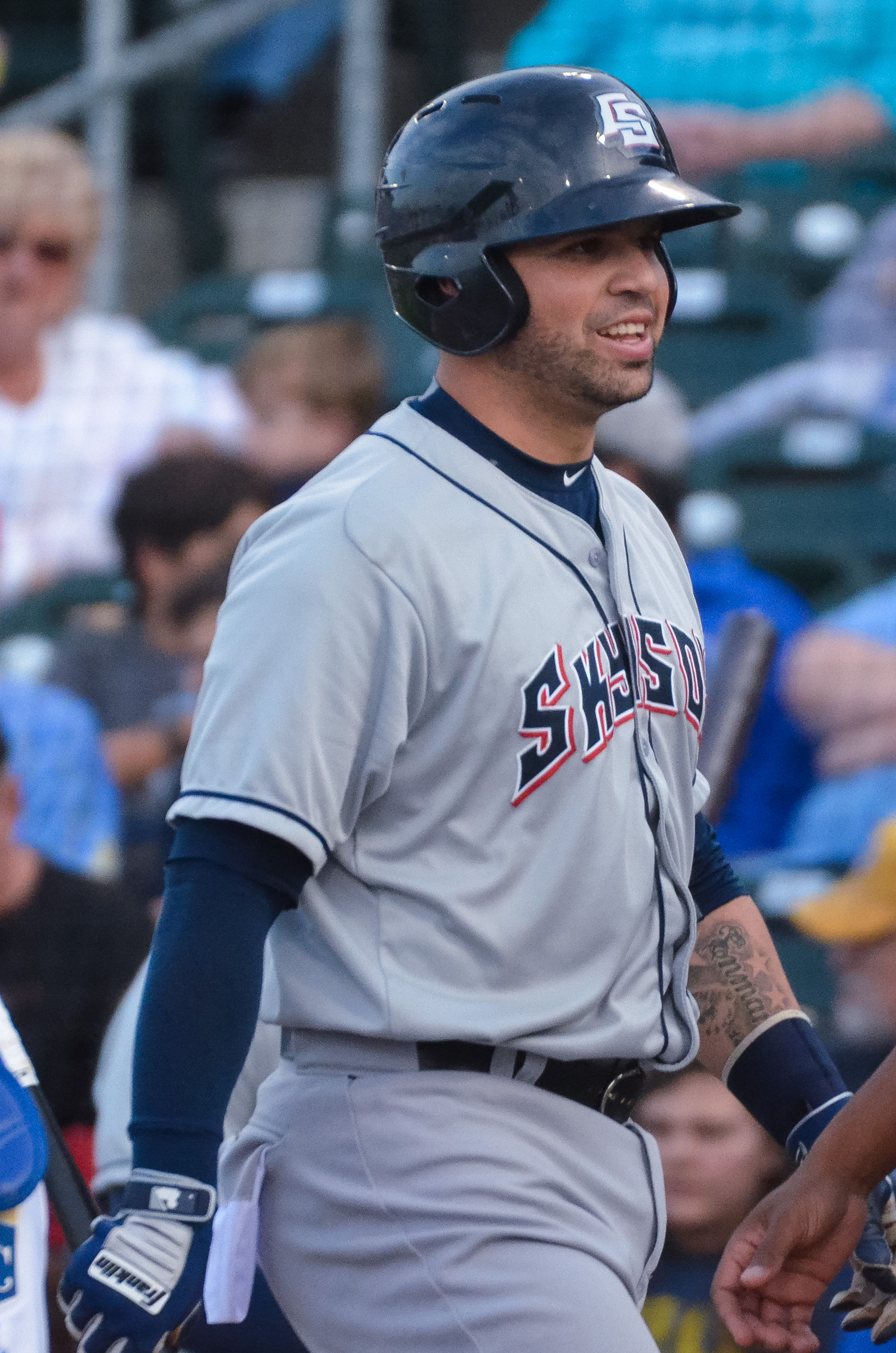
- Piña with the Colorado Springs Sky Sox in 2016
- Catcher
- Born: June 5, 1987 (age 38); Barquisimeto, Venezuela
- Batted: Right Threw: Right

MLB debut
- August 3, 2011, for the Kansas City Royals

Last appearance
- July 9, 2023, for the Oakland Athletics

MLB statistics
- Batting average: .243
- Home runs: 43
- Runs batted in: 149
- Stats at Baseball Reference

Teams
- Kansas City Royals (2011–2012); Milwaukee Brewers (2016–2021); Atlanta Braves (2022); Oakland Athletics (2023)

Manuel Elías Piña Reyes (/ˈpiːnjə/; born June 5, 1987) is a Venezuelan former professional baseball catcher. He has previously played in Major League Baseball (MLB) for the Kansas City Royals, Milwaukee Brewers, Atlanta Braves, and Oakland Athletics.

== Career ==
=== Texas Rangers organization ===
Piña began his professional baseball career in 2005 in the Texas Rangers system, hitting .247 in 27 games for the AZL Rangers. He missed most of the 2006 season, as he was recovering from right elbow surgery. He played for the AZL Rangers again in 2007, hitting .244 in 14 games. In 2007, he played for the Clinton LumberKings, hitting .228 in 86 games. He split 2008 between the Bakersfield Blaze (61 games) and Frisco RoughRiders (23 games), hitting .267 overall. With the RoughRiders again in 2009, he hit .259 in 86 games.

=== Kansas City Royals ===
On September 3, 2009, the Rangers traded Piña and outfielder Tim Smith to the Kansas City Royals for Daniel Gutierrez. On July 31, 2011, the Royals added Piña to the Royals' active roster after Matt Treanor was placed on the disabled list. He made his major league debut on August 3, getting two hits in a win over the Baltimore Orioles. He also threw out Vladimir Guerrero while trying to steal second base in the first inning of this game. In 2012, Piña underwent surgery for a meniscus tear in his right knee, and missed the first three months of the season.

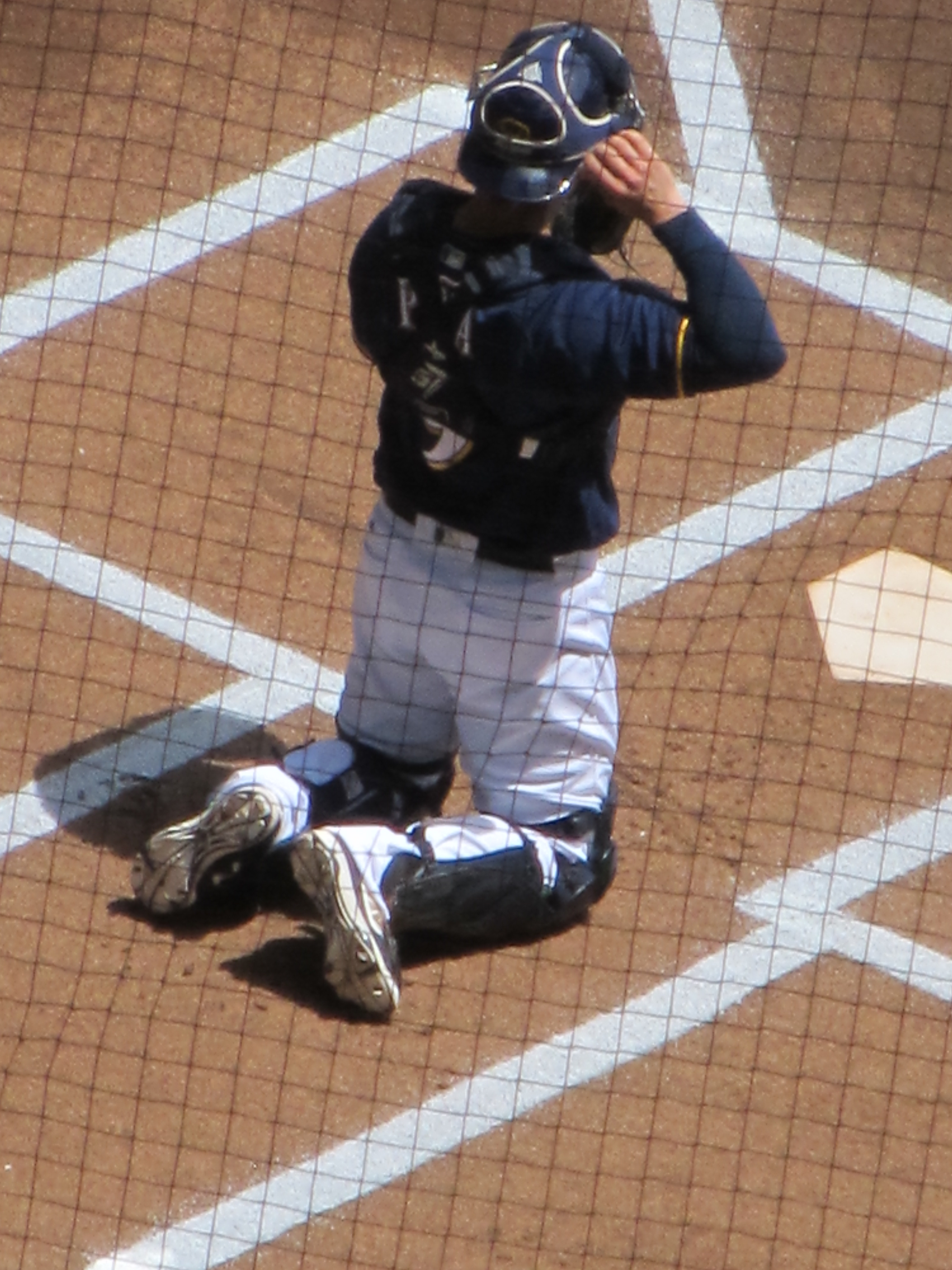
Piña behind home plate in 2017

On November 2, 2012, the Royals designated Piña for assignment and sent him outright to the Omaha Royals. He began the 2013 season rehabbing from an injury to his right knee's lateral meniscus, and was on the disabled list till June 30.

=== Seattle Mariners and Detroit Tigers organizations ===
On January 17, 2014, Piña signed a minor league contract with the Seattle Mariners. On June 11, the Detroit Tigers acquired Piña from the Seattle Mariners in exchange for a player to be named later. He was then assigned to the Tigers' Triple-A affiliate, the Toledo Mud Hens.

=== Milwaukee Brewers ===
On December 10, 2015, the Tigers traded Piña to the Milwaukee Brewers as the player to be named later in the Francisco Rodríguez trade to complete the deal. In 2016, he hit .254 with 2 home runs and 12 RBIs in 33 games with the Brewers. He began the 2017 splitting playing time at catcher with Jett Bandy, hitting .279/.327/.424 with career-highs in home runs (9) and RBI (43). In 2018, Piña hit .252/.307/.395, tying his career-high in home runs (9) and getting 28 RBI as well. He began the 2019 season as the backup catcher. He was placed on the disabled list on May 16, 2019, with a hamstring injury. He finished the year with a batting line of .228/.313/.411 with 7 home runs and 25 RBI. In 2020, Piña played in 15 games for the Brewers, slashing .231/.333/.410 with 2 home runs and 5 RBI before his season was cut short in August due to a torn meniscus in his right knee.

=== Atlanta Braves ===
After the 2021 season, Piña signed a two-year, $8 million contract with the Atlanta Braves. He was placed on the injured list on April 25, 2022, due to inflammation in his left wrist. While attempting rehabilitation for the injury, Piña felt more discomfort, and a subsequent MRI revealed that surgery would be necessary, for which he missed the remainder of the season.

=== Oakland Athletics ===
The Braves sent Piña to the Oakland Athletics in a three-team trade on December 12, 2022, in which the Braves acquired Sean Murphy, the Milwaukee Brewers acquired William Contreras, Joel Payamps, and Justin Yeager, and the Athletics also acquired Esteury Ruiz, Kyle Muller, Freddy Tarnok, and Royber Salinas. Piña began the 2023 season on the injured list with left wrist inflammation. After suffering a setback in his rehab, Piña was transferred to the 60-day injured list on May 11. He was activated for his season debut on July 4. After playing in 4 games, in which he went 3–for–12 (.250), he was placed back on the injured list with a bruised left wrist on July 14. On July 31, Piña was activated from the injured list and subsequently designated for assignment. He was released by the Athletics organization on August 4.

== See also ==
- List of Major League Baseball players from Venezuela
