= 2017 Colorado Rockies season =

2017 Colorado Rockies
- League: National League
- Division: West
- Ballpark: Coors Field
- City: Denver, Colorado
- Record: 87–75 (.537)
- Divisional place: 3rd
- Owners: Charles & Richard Monfort
- General manager: Jeff Bridich
- Manager: Bud Black
- Television: Root Sports Rocky Mountain (April–July); AT&T SportsNet Rocky Mountain (July–October) (Drew Goodman, Jeff Huson, Ryan Spilborghs)
- Radio: KOA (English); Colorado Rockies Radio Network (Jack Corrigan, Jerry Schemmel); KNRV (Spanish) (Salvador Hernandez, Javier Olivas, Carlos Valdez)
- Stats: ESPN.com; Baseball Reference

The 2017 Colorado Rockies season was the franchise's 25th in Major League Baseball. It was the 23rd season the Rockies played their home games at Coors Field. Bud Black became the new Rockies Manager after the resignation of Walt Weiss. Black in his first season was a finalist for the Manager of the Year award. The Rockies finished the season 87–75 in third place in the National League West, achieving their first winning season since 2010, but finished 17 games behind the Los Angeles Dodgers. They did, however, receive the second wild card spot in the National League and advanced to the playoffs for the first time since 2009. In the NLWC Game, they lost to the Arizona Diamondbacks.

== Offseason and spring training ==
- December 13, 2016: Ian Desmond was signed as a free agent by the Colorado Rockies.
- December 15, 2016: Mike Dunn was signed as a free agent by the Colorado Rockies.
- January 17, 2017: Alexi Amarista was signed as a free agent by the Colorado Rockies.
- January 28, 2017: Greg Holland was signed as a free agent by the Colorado Rockies.
- February 1, 2017: Eddie Butler was traded by the Colorado Rockies to the Chicago Cubs for James Farris (minors).
- April 2, 2017: Ryan Hanigan was signed as a free agent by the Colorado Rockies.

For their pre-season spring training, the Rockies participated in the Cactus League, finishing with a 16–15 win–loss record. In addition, two of their games finished tied and are not included in the standings.

== Regular season ==
=== Summary ===
The Rockies won their Opening Day game on April 3, defeating the Milwaukee Brewers, 7−5. Relief pitcher Greg Holland, making his Rockies debut, earned the save, his first save since September 17, 2015.

Holland won the National League Reliever of the Month Award for April.

On Mother's Day, Holland broke the franchise record of converting 16 consecutive saves to start a season, formerly held by José Jiménez, which he had set in 2002.

For the month of May, Charlie Blackmon won his first MLB Player of the Month Award, for the National League. He led the NL in hits (42) and triples (five), was second in batting average (.359), fourth in runs scored (24), tied for fifth in RBI (22), and tied for seventh with a 1.037 OPS. Holland won his second consecutive NL Reliever of the Month Award, going for 20-for-20 in save opportunities, a 1.31 ERA and 0.82 WHIP through May.

On June 18, 2017, Nolan Arenado hit for the cycle versus the San Francisco Giants. The home run was a walk off, securing a 7−5 win off Giants closer Mark Melancon. The 288th cycle in MLB history, it was the eighth by a Rockies player, and the 17th overall accomplished at Coors Field. It was only the sixth time (Note: According to Elias Sports Bureau, it was only the fifth time in MLB history.) in MLB history that a cycle included a walk-off home run; Carlos González did the same on July 31, 2010, versus the Chicago Cubs.

During the June 28 game versus the Giants, Arenado knocked down a line drive batted by pitcher Ty Blach as he was facing third base, spun on his stomach, and, without getting up on his feet, threw out Blach at first base.

Arenado set career-highs with three home runs and five hits, while tying a career-high seven RBI in an 18–4 rout of the San Diego Padres on July 19. He tied the franchise record held by Jeff Cirillo and Todd Walker for the number of total bases in a single game with 14, and became the first player in Rockies history to reach both three home runs and five hits in a single game. He also became the first player in the majors to reach 80 RBI. Named NL Player of the Week for the fourth time of his career on July 23, Arenado hit .458/.480/1.000 with four home runs and 13 RBI in five games. He later won NL Player of the Month Award for July, his second career monthly award, after hitting .389/.423/.744 with eight home runs, 35 hits, 15 extra base hits, 30 RBIs and 18 runs scored in 22 games.

With a two-run home run versus José Ureña of the Miami Marlins on August 11, Arenado became the first major leaguer of 2017 to reach 100 RBI, doing so in 112 games. He had batted .441 and 77 RBI with runners in scoring position (RISP).

On September 16 versus the Padres, Arenado drove in his 125th run of the season, becoming the first third baseman and first Rockies player to do so in three consecutive seasons. Later that September, he became the 11th player in major league history to drive in 130 or more runs in three successive seasons. Writing for The Sporting News, Joe Rivera noted that per Fangraphs Arenado was the fourth player in history to net at least 100 defensive runs saved within his first five seasons (103).

On September 29, 2017, Blackmon homered versus Hyun-Jin Ryu of the Los Angeles Dodgers to reach 102 RBI, surpassing Darin Erstad in 2000 for the major league record of RBI by a leadoff hitter in one season and led to only their fourth regular season series win over the Dodgers since the teams first met in 1993.

=== Season standings ===
==== National League West ====
NL West
Team	W	L	Pct.	GB	Home	Road
Los Angeles Dodgers	104	58	.642	—	57‍–‍24	47‍–‍34
Arizona Diamondbacks	93	69	.574	11	52‍–‍29	41‍–‍40
Colorado Rockies	87	75	.537	17	46‍–‍35	41‍–‍40
San Diego Padres	71	91	.438	33	43‍–‍38	28‍–‍53
San Francisco Giants	64	98	.395	40	38‍–‍43	26‍–‍55

==== National League Wild Card ====
Division leaders
Team	W	L	Pct.
Los Angeles Dodgers	104	58	.642
Washington Nationals	97	65	.599
Chicago Cubs	92	70	.568

Wild Card teams (Top 2 teams qualify for postseason)
Team	W	L	Pct.	GB
Arizona Diamondbacks	93	69	.574	+6
Colorado Rockies	87	75	.537	—
Milwaukee Brewers	86	76	.531	1
St. Louis Cardinals	83	79	.512	4
Miami Marlins	77	85	.475	10
Pittsburgh Pirates	75	87	.463	12
Atlanta Braves	72	90	.444	15
San Diego Padres	71	91	.438	16
New York Mets	70	92	.432	17
Cincinnati Reds	68	94	.420	19
Philadelphia Phillies	66	96	.407	21
San Francisco Giants	64	98	.395	23

=== Record vs. opponents ===
2017 National League record Source: MLB Standings Grid – 2017
Team	AZ	ATL	CHC	CIN	COL	LAD	MIA	MIL	NYM	PHI	PIT	SD	SF	STL	WSH	AL
Arizona	—	2–4	3–3	3–3	11–8	11–8	3–4	4–3	6–1	6–1	4–3	11–8	12–7	3–4	2–4	12–8
Atlanta	4–2	—	1–6	3–3	3–4	3–4	11–8	4–2	7–12	6–13	2–5	5–2	4–3	1–5	9–10	9–11
Chicago	3–3	6–1	—	12–7	2–5	2–4	4–3	10–9	4–2	4–3	10–9	2–4	4–3	14–5	3–4	12–8
Cincinnati	3–3	3–3	7–12	—	3–4	0–6	2–5	8–11	3–4	4–2	13–6	3–4	4–3	9–10	1–6	5–15
Colorado	8–11	4–3	5–2	4–3	—	10–9	2–4	4–3	3–3	5–2	3–3	12–7	12–7	2–4	3–4	10–10
Los Angeles	8–11	4–3	4–2	6–0	9–10	—	6–1	3–3	7–0	4–3	6–1	13–6	11–8	4–3	3–3	16–4
Miami	4–3	8–11	3–4	5–2	4–2	1–6	—	2–4	12–7	8–11	3–4	5–1	5–1	2–5	6–13	9–11
Milwaukee	3–4	2–4	9–10	11–8	3–4	3–3	4–2	—	5–2	3–3	9–10	5–2	3–4	11–8	4–3	11–9
New York	1–6	12–7	2–4	4–3	3–3	0–7	7–12	2–5	—	12–7	3–3	3–4	5–1	3–4	6–13	7–13
Philadelphia	1–6	13–6	3–4	2–4	2–5	3–4	11–8	3–3	7–12	—	2–5	1–5	4–3	1–5	8–11	5–15
Pittsburgh	3–4	5–2	9–10	6–13	3–3	1–6	4–3	10–9	3–3	5–2	—	3–3	1–5	8–11	4–3	10–10
San Diego	8–11	2–5	4–2	4–3	7–12	6–13	1–5	2–5	4–3	5–1	3–3	—	12–7	3–4	2–5	8–12
San Francisco	7–12	3–4	3–4	3–4	7–12	8–11	1–5	4–3	1–5	3–4	5–1	7–12	—	3–4	1–5	8–12
St. Louis	4–3	5–1	5–14	10–9	4–2	3–4	5–2	8–11	4–3	5–1	11–8	4–3	4–3	—	3–3	8–12
Washington	4–2	10–9	4–3	6–1	4–3	3–3	13–6	3–4	13–6	11–8	3–4	5–2	5–1	3–3	—	10–10

=== Transactions ===
- April 5, 2017: Jason Motte was released by the Colorado Rockies.
- July 5, 2017: Chad Qualls was released by the Colorado Rockies.
- July 26, 2017: Pat Neshek was traded by the Philadelphia Phillies to the Colorado Rockies for J.D. Hammer, Jose Gomez (minors), and Alejenadro Requena (minors).
- July 30, 2017: Jonathan Lucroy was traded by the Texas Rangers to the Colorado Rockies for a player to be named later. The Colorado Rockies sent Pedro Gonzalez (minors) (August 23, 2017) to the Texas Rangers to complete the trade.
- August 1, 2017: Jordan Lyles was released by the Colorado Rockies.

=== Major League Debuts ===
- Batters
  - Mike Tauchman (Jun 27)
  - Ryan McMahon (Aug 12)
- Pitchers
  - Antonio Senzatela (Apr 6)
  - Kyle Freeland (Apr 7)
  - Shane Carle (Apr 14)

== Roster ==
2017 Colorado Rockies
**Roster**
**Pitchers**: 44 Tyler Anderson; 35 Chad Bettis; 29 Shane Carle; 32 Tyler Chatwood; 47 Jairo Díaz; 38 Mike Dunn; 54 Carlos Estévez; 31 Kyle Freeland; 55 Jon Gray; 34 Jeff Hoffman; 56 Greg Holland; 24 Jordan Lyles; 48 Germán Márquez; 51 Jake McGee; 37 Pat Neshek; 45 Scott Oberg; 0 Adam Ottavino; 50 Chad Qualls; 60 Zac Rosscup; 52 Chris Rusin; 49 Antonio Senzatela	**Catchers**: 13 Dustin Garneau; 30 Ryan Hanigan; 21 Jonathan Lucroy; 23 Tom Murphy; 14 Tony Wolters; **Infielders**: 18 Cristhian Adames; 2 Alexi Amarista; 28 Nolan Arenado; 20 Ian Desmond; 9 DJ LeMahieu; 1,24 Ryan McMahon; 12 Mark Reynolds; 27 Trevor Story; 4 Pat Valaika; **Outfielders**: 19 Charlie Blackmon; 16 Stephen Cardullo; 5 Carlos González; 8 Gerardo Parra; 7 Raimel Tapia; 3 Mike Tauchman	**Manager**: 10 Bud Black; **Coaches**: 39 Stu Cole (third base); 43 Tony Diaz (first base); 58 Duane Espy (hitting); 36 Steve Foster (pitching); 53 Ron Gideon (coach); 40 Darren Holmes (bullpen); 66 Aaron Muñoz (bullpen catcher); 11 Mike Redmond (bench); 41 Jeff Salazar (assistant hitting)

=== Game log ===
2017 game log: 87–75 (Home: 46–35; Away: 41–40)
April: 16–10 (Home: 7–6; Away: 9–4)

#	Date	Opponent	Score	Win	Loss	Save	Attendance	Record	Streak
1	April 3	@ Brewers	7–5	**Estévez** (1–0)	Mariñez (0–1)	**Holland** (1)	43,336	1–0	W1
2	April 4	@ Brewers	6–5	**Anderson** (1–0)	Davies (0–1)	**Holland** (2)	21,458	2–0	W2
3	April 5	@ Brewers	6–1	Peralta (1–0)	**Chatwood** (0–1)	Feliz (1)	21,824	2–1	L1
4	April 6	@ Brewers	2–1	**Dunn** (1–0)	Feliz (0–1)	**Holland** (3)	23,828	3–1	W1
5	April 7	Dodgers	2–1	**Freeland** (1–0)	Ryu (0–1)	**McGee** (1)	49,169	4–1	W2
6	April 8	Dodgers	4–2	**Dunn** (2–0)	Kershaw (1–1)	**Holland** (4)	48,012	5–1	W3
7	April 9	Dodgers	10–6	Maeda (1–1)	**Anderson** (1–1)		33,529	5–2	L1
8	April 10	Padres	5–3	Díaz (1–0)	**Chatwood** (0–2)		20,504	5–3	L2
9	April 11	Padres	3–2	**Senzatela** (1–0)	Díaz (1–1)	**Holland** (5)	20,664	6–3	W1
10	April 12	Padres	6–0	Lee (1–0)	**Freeland** (1–1)		20,968	6–4	L1
11	April 13	@ Giants	3–1	**Rusin** (1–0)	Bumgarner (0–2)	**Holland** (6)	41,915	7–4	W1
12	April 14	@ Giants	8–2	Cueto (3–0)	**Anderson** (1–2)		42,738	7–5	L1
13	April 15	@ Giants	5–0	**Chatwood** (1–2)	Moore (1–2)		42,371	8–5	W1
14	April 16	@ Giants	4–3	**Senzatela** (2–0)	Samardzija (0–3)	**Holland** (7)	41,455	9–5	W2
15	April 18	@ Dodgers	4–3	**Rusin** (2–0)	Ryu (0–3)	**Holland** (8)	37,960	10–5	W3
16	April 19	@ Dodgers	4–2	Kershaw (3–1)	**Anderson** (1–3)	Jansen (4)	45,474	10–6	L1
17	April 21	Giants	6–5	**Chatwood** (2–2)	Cueto (3–1)	**Holland** (9)	27,663	11–6	W1
18	April 22	Giants	12–3	**Senzatela** (3–0)	Moore (1–3)		39,239	12–6	W2
19	April 23	Giants	8–0	**Freeland** (2–1)	Samardzija (0–4)		42,011	13–6	W3
20	April 24	Nationals	8–4	**Estévez** (2–0)	Romero (1–1)		23,019	14–6	W4
21	April 25	Nationals	15–12	Romero (2–1)	**Márquez** (0–1)		21,340	14–7	L1
22	April 26	Nationals	11–4	Roark (3–0)	**Chatwood** (2–3)		22,461	14–8	L2
23	April 27	Nationals	16–5	González (3–0)	**Senzatela** (3–1)		34,929	14–9	L3
24	April 28	@ Diamondbacks	3–1	**Freeland** (3–1)	Ray (2–1)	**Holland** (10)	19,300	15–9	W1
25	April 29	@ Diamondbacks	7–6	**Estévez** (3–0)	Rodney (1–2)	**Holland** (11)	30,445	16–9	W2
26	April 30	@ Diamondbacks	2–0 (13)	Delgado (1–0)	**Lyles** (0–1)		23,613	16–10	L1

May: 17–12 (Home: 8–7; Away: 9–5)

#	Date	Opponent	Score	Win	Loss	Save	Attendance	Record	Streak
27	May 2	@ Padres	6–2	Cahill (2–2)	**Chatwood** (2–4)		18,910	16–11	L2
28	May 3	@ Padres	11–3	**Senzatela** (4–1)	Weaver (0–3)		16,487	17–11	W1
29	May 4	@ Padres	3–2 (11)	**Qualls** (1–0)	Hand (0–1)	**Holland** (12)	16,356	18–11	W2
30	May 5	Diamondbacks	6–3	Greinke (3–2)	**Márquez** (0–2)	Rodney (8)	30,030	18–12	L1
31	May 6	Diamondbacks	9–1	**Anderson** (2–3)	Corbin (2–4)	**Rusin** (1)	36,165	19–12	W1
32	May 7	Diamondbacks	5–2	**Chatwood** (3–4)	Walker (3–2)	**Holland** (13)	39,175	20–12	W2
–	May 8	Cubs	Postponed (rain) Rescheduled for May 9						
33	May 9	Cubs	10–4	**Senzatela** (5–1)	Arrieta (4–2)		34,779	21–12	W3
34	May 9	Cubs	8–1	Lackey (3–3)	**Freeland** (3–2)		36,563	21–13	L1
35	May 10	Cubs	3–0	**Márquez** (1–2)	Hendricks (2–2)	**Holland** (14)	35,213	22–13	W1
36	May 11	Dodgers	10–7	**Hoffman** (1–0)	Ryu (1–5)	**Holland** (15)	27,265	23–13	W2
37	May 12	Dodgers	6–2	Kershaw (6–2)	**Chatwood** (3–5)		40,146	23–14	L1
38	May 13	Dodgers	4–0	Wood (4–0)	**Anderson** (2–4)		43,534	23–15	L2
39	May 14	Dodgers	9–6	**Senzatela** (6–1)	Urías (0–1)	**Holland** (16)	41,051	24–15	W1
40	May 16	@ Twins	7–3	**Freeland** (4–2)	Hughes (4–2)	**Holland** (17)	24,295	25–15	W2
–	May 17	@ Twins	Postponed (rain) Rescheduled for May 18						
41	May 18	@ Twins	5–1	**Márquez** (2–2)	Santana (6–2)	**Holland** (18)	20,603	26–15	W3
42	May 18	@ Twins	2–0	Berríos (2–0)	**Chatwood** (3–6)	Kintzler (11)	17,140	26–16	L1
43	May 19	@ Reds	12–6	**Anderson** (3–4)	Bonilla (0–2)		23,184	27–16	W1
44	May 20	@ Reds	12–8	Wojciechowski (1–0)	**Dunn** (2–1)		25,188	27–17	L1
45	May 21	@ Reds	6–4	**Freeland** (5–2)	Arroyo (3–4)	**Holland** (19)	23,352	28–17	W1
46	May 22	@ Phillies	8–1	**Hoffman** (2–0)	Eickhoff (0–5)		21,251	29–17	W2
47	May 23	@ Phillies	8–2	**Márquez** (3–2)	Eflin (0–2)		17,109	30–17	W3
48	May 24	@ Phillies	7–2	**Chatwood** (4–6)	Hellickson (5–2)		19,160	31–17	W4
49	May 25	@ Phillies	2–1 (11)	Gómez (3–1)	**Oberg** (0–1)		18,143	31–18	L1
50	May 26	Cardinals	10–0	**Senzatela** (7–1)	Martínez (3–4)		40,312	32–18	W1
51	May 27	Cardinals	3–0	Wainwright (5–3)	**Freeland** (5–3)	Oh (11)	48,106	32–19	L1
52	May 28	Cardinals	8–4	**Márquez** (4–2)	Lynn (4–3)		48,372	33–19	W1
53	May 29	Mariners	6–5	Gaviglio (1–1)	**Chatwood** (4–7)	Díaz (9)	40,298	33–20	L1
54	May 30	Mariners	10–4	Miranda (5–2)	**Anderson** (3–5)		33,258	33–21	L2
55	May 31	@ Mariners	5–0	Paxton (4–0)	**Senzatela** (7–2)		16,750	33–22	L3

June: 15–12 (Home: 7–2; Away: 8–10)

#	Date	Opponent	Score	Win	Loss	Save	Attendance	Record	Streak
56	June 1	@ Mariners	6–3	**Freeland** (6–3)	Gallardo (2–6)	**Holland** (20)	21,536	34–22	W1
57	June 2	@ Padres	8–5	Richard (4–6)	**Márquez** (4–3)	Maurer (9)	20,932	34–23	L1
58	June 3	@ Padres	10–1	**Chatwood** (5–7)	Chacín (4–5)		20,996	35–23	W1
59	June 4	@ Padres	3–1	**Hoffman** (3–0)	Cosart (0–2)	**Holland** (21)	24,763	36–23	W2
60	June 6	Indians	11–3	**Senzatela** (8–2)	Clevinger (2–3)		39,508	37–23	W3
61	June 7	Indians	8–1	**Freeland** (7–3)	Bauer (5–5)		36,909	38–23	W4
62	June 8	@ Cubs	4–1	**Chatwood** (6–7)	Lester (3–4)	**Holland** (22)	39,385	39–23	W5
63	June 9	@ Cubs	5–3	**Rusin** (3–0)	Frankoff (0–1)	**Holland** (23)	41,229	40–23	W6
64	June 10	@ Cubs	9–1	**Hoffman** (4–0)	Butler (3–2)		41,226	41–23	W7
65	June 11	@ Cubs	7–5	Edwards Jr. (2–0)	**Lyles** (0–2)	Davis (13)	41,116	41–24	L1
66	June 12	@ Pirates	7–2	Taillon (3–1)	**Freeland** (7–4)		16,320	41–25	L2
67	June 13	@ Pirates	5–2	Cole (4–6)	**Ottavino** (0–1)		16,764	41–26	L3
68	June 14	@ Pirates	5–1	**Márquez** (5–3)	Kuhl (1–6)		17,308	42–26	W1
69	June 15	Giants	10–9	**Holland** (1–0)	Strickland (1–2)		40,747	43–26	W2
70	June 16	Giants	10–8	**Senzatela** (9–2)	Samardzija (2–9)	**Holland** (24)	46,632	44–26	W3
71	June 17	Giants	5–1	**Freeland** (8–4)	Cain (3–6)		48,035	45–26	W4
72	June 18	Giants	7–5	**Estévez** (4–0)	Melancon (1–2)		48,341	46–26	W5
73	June 20	Diamondbacks	4–3	**Ottavino** (1–1)	Greinke (8–4)	**Holland** (25)	35,016	47–26	W6
74	June 21	Diamondbacks	16–5	Walker (6–3)	**Hoffman** (4–1)		40,918	47–27	L1
75	June 22	Diamondbacks	10–3	Godley (3–1)	**Senzatela** (9–3)		40,681	47–28	L2
76	June 23	@ Dodgers	6–1	Wood (8–0)	**Freeland** (8–5)		43.787	47–29	L3
77	June 24	@ Dodgers	4–0	Kershaw (11–2)	**Chatwood** (6–8)		50,403	47–30	L4
78	June 25	@ Dodgers	12–6	Báez (2–0)	**Ottavino** (1–2)	Jansen (17)	41,605	47–31	L5
79	June 26	@ Giants	9–2	Samardzija (3–9)	**Márquez** (5–4)		41,388	47–32	L6
80	June 27	@ Giants	4–3 (14)	Gearrin (2–2)	**Qualls** (1–1)		41,331	47–33	L7
81	June 28	@ Giants	5–3	Blach (5–5)	**Freeland** (8–6)	Strickland (1)	41,286	47–34	L8
82	June 30	@ Diamondbacks	6–3	**Gray** (1–0)	Ray (8–4)	**Holland** (26)	23,275	48–34	W1

July: 12–12 (Home: 9–4; Away: 3–8)

#	Date	Opponent	Score	Win	Loss	Save	Attendance	Record	Streak
83	July 1	@ Diamondbacks	6–2	Greinke (10–4)	**Chatwood** (6–9)		46,338	48–35	L1
84	July 2	@ Diamondbacks	4–3	Rodney (3–2)	**Ottavino** (1–3)		34,556	48–36	L2
85	July 3	Reds	5–3	**Hoffman** (5–1)	Castillo (0–1)	**Holland** (27)	49,131	49–36	W1
86	July 4	Reds	8–1	Bailey (1–2)	**Freeland** (8–7)		48,338	49–37	L1
87	July 5	Reds	5–3	**Gray** (2–0)	Feldman (7–6)	**Holland** (28)	32,188	50–37	W1
88	July 6	Reds	6–3	Romano (1–1)	**Chatwood** (6–10)		27,328	50–38	L1
89	July 7	White Sox	12–4	**Márquez** (6–4)	Holland (5–9)		38,386	51–38	W1
90	July 8	White Sox	5–4	Kahnle (1–3)	**Holland** (1–1)	Robertson (13)	48,118	51–39	L1
91	July 9	White Sox	10–0	**Freeland** (9–7)	Rodon (1–2)		36,541	52–39	W1
**88th All-Star Game in Miami, Florida**
92	July 14	@ Mets	14–2	deGrom (10–3)	**Gray** (2–1)		27,582	52–40	L1
93	July 15	@ Mets	9–3	Lugo (4–2)	**Chatwood** (6–11)		34,783	52–41	L2
94	July 16	@ Mets	13–4	**Hoffman** (6–1)	Matz (2–3)		28,745	53–41	W1
95	July 17	Padres	9–6	**Márquez** (7–4)	Perdomo (4–5)	**Holland** (29)	37,561	54–41	W2
96	July 18	Padres	9–7	**Senzatela** (10–3)	Lamet (3–4)	**Holland** (30)	40,101	55–41	W3
97	July 19	Padres	18–4	**Gray** (3–1)	Richard (5–10)		37,128	56–41	W4
98	July 21	Pirates	13–5	Williams (4–4)	**Hoffman** (6–2)		41,192	56–42	L1
99	July 22	Pirates	7–3	**Márquez** (8–4)	Kuhl (3–7)	**Holland** (31)	48,235	57–42	W1
100	July 23	Pirates	13–3	**Freeland** (10–7)	Nova (10–7)		40,118	58–42	W2
101	July 24	@ Cardinals	8–2	Leake (7–8)	**Senzatela** (10–4)		40,486	58–43	L1
102	July 25	@ Cardinals	3–2	Rosenthal (3–4)	**McGee** (0–1)		41,514	58–44	L2
103	July 26	@ Cardinals	10–5	Martinez (7–8)	**Hoffman** (6–3)		38,162	58–45	L3
—	July 28	@ Nationals	Postponed (rain); Rescheduled for July 30						
104	July 29	@ Nationals	4–2	**Márquez** (9–4)	Roark (8–7)	**Holland** (32)	33,989	59–45	W1
105	July 30	@ Nationals	10–6	**Freeland** (11–7)	Fedde (0–1)	**Holland** (33)	33,248	60–45	W2
106	July 30	@ Nationals	3–1	Jackson (2–1)	**Gray** (3–2)	Doolittle (6)	31,118	60–46	L1

August: 12–15 (Home: 8–8; Away: 4–7)

#	Date	Opponent	Score	Win	Loss	Save	Attendance	Record	Streak
107	August 1	Mets	5–4	**Dunn** (3–1)	Robles (6–2)		36,698	61–46	W1
108	August 2	Mets	10–5	Bradford (1–0)	**Chatwood** (6–12)		36,945	61–47	L1
109	August 3	Mets	5–4	**Holland** (2–1)	Robles (6–3)		35,276	62–47	W1
110	August 4	Phillies	4–3	**Dunn** (4–1)	García (1–3)	**Holland** (34)	35,092	63–47	W2
111	August 5	Phillies	8–5	**Gray** (4–2)	Pivetta (4–7)		40,563	64–47	W3
112	August 6	Phillies	3–2	Ramos (1–7)	**Holland** (2–2)	Neris (11)	48,069	64–48	L1
113	August 8	@ Indians	4–1	Kluber (10–3)	**Holland** (2–3)	—	26,088	64–49	L2
114	August 9	@ Indians	3–2 (12)	**Estévez** (5–0)	McAllister (1–2)	**Chatwood** (1)	25,539	65–49	W1
115	August 11	@ Marlins	6–3	Tazawa (2–2)	**McGee** (0–2)	Ziegler (3)	20,096	65–50	L1
116	August 12	@ Marlins	4–3	Nicolino (1–1)	**Hoffman** (6–4)	Ziegler (4)	20,399	65–51	L2
117	August 13	@ Marlins	5–3	Guerra (1–0)	**Márquez** (9–5)	Despaigne (1)	20,769	65–52	L3
118	August 14	Braves	3–0	**Dunn** (5–1)	Brothers (2–3)	**Holland** (35)	33,641	66–52	W1
119	August 15	Braves	4–3	Freeman (2–0)	**Neshek** (3–3)	Vizcaíno (7)	28,655	66–53	L1
120	August 16	Braves	17–2	**Gray** (5–2)	Foltynewicz (10–8)	—	30,695	67–53	W1
121	August 17	Braves	10–4	Sims (1–3)	**Hoffman** (6–5)	—	30,020	67–54	L1
122	August 18	Brewers	8–4	**Marquez** (10–5)	Garza (6–7)	—	32,385	68–54	W1
123	August 19	Brewers	6–3	Swarzak (6–3)	**Holland** (2–4)	Knebel (25)	47,216	68–55	L1
124	August 20	Brewers	8–4	Anderson (7–2)	**Freeland** (11–8)	Knebel (26)	32,426	68–56	L2
125	August 22	@ Royals	3–2	Duffy (8–8)	**Gray** (5–3)	Alexander (1)	22,868	68–57	L3
126	August 23	@ Royals	6–4	Maurer (3–5)	**Holland** (2–5)	—	25,752	68–58	L4
127	August 24	@ Royals	3–2	**Ottavino** (2–3)	Minor (5–6)	**Holland** (36)	25,314	69–58	W1
128	August 25	@ Braves	2–5	Teherán (8–11)	**Bettis** (0–1)	Vizcaíno (8)	33,577	69–59	L1
129	August 26	@ Braves	7–6	**Neshek** (4–3)	Vizcaíno (3–3)	**McGee** (2)	32,448	70–59	W1
130	August 27	@ Braves	3–0	**Gray** (6–3)	Foltynewicz (10–10)	**McGee** (3)	28,154	71–59	W2
131	August 28	Tigers	4–3	Zimmermann (8–11)	**Senzatela** (10–5)	Greene (6)	30,754	71–60	L1
132	August 29	Tigers	7–3	**Neshek** (5–3)	Fulmer (10–12)	—	30,721	72–60	W1
133	August 30	Tigers	2–6	Verlander (10–8)	**Bettis** (0–2)	—	29,281	72–61	L1

September/October: 15–14 (Home: 7–8; Away: 8–6)

#	Date	Opponent	Score	Win	Loss	Save	Attendance	Record	Streak
134	September 1	Diamondbacks	9–5	Walker (8–7)	**Freeland** (11–9)	—	29,628	72–62	L2
135	September 2	Diamondbacks	6–2	Corbin (13–11)	**Gray** (6–4)	—	39,442	72–63	L3
136	September 3	Diamondbacks	5–1	Godley (7–7)	**Marquez** (10–6)	Sherfy (1)	33,838	72–64	L4
137	September 4	Giants	4–3	**Holland** (3–5)	Okert (1–1)	—	28,300	73–64	W1
138	September 5	Giants	9–6	**Rusin** (4–0)	Blach (8–12)	**Holland** (37)	24,245	74–64	W2
139	September 6	Giants	11–3	Cueto (7–7)	**Freeland** (11–10)	—	26,674	74–65	L1
140	September 7	@ Dodgers	9–1	**Gray** (7–4)	Kershaw (16–3)	—	51,492	75–65	W1
141	September 8	@ Dodgers	5–4	**Rusin** (5–0)	Darvish (8–12)	**Holland** (38)	53,632	76–65	W2
142	September 9	@ Dodgers	6–5	**Bettis** (1–2)	Wood (14–3)	**Holland** (39)	52,884	77–65	W3
143	September 10	@ Dodgers	8–1	**Chatwood** (7–12)	Hill (9–8)	—	50,161	78–65	W4
144	September 11	@ Diamondbacks	5–4	**Anderson** (4–5)	Barrett (1–1)	**Holland** (40)	24,178	79–65	W5
145	September 12	@ Diamondbacks	4–2	**Gray** (8–4)	Hernandez (3–1)	**Rusin** (2)	27,526	80–65	W6
146	September 13	@ Diamondbacks	8–1	Corbin (14–12)	**Marquez** (10–7)	—	26,714	80–66	L1
147	September 14	@ Diamondbacks	7–0	Godley (8–7)	**Bettis** (1–3)	—	20,317	80–67	L2
148	September 15	Padres	6–1	**Chatwood** (8–12)	Richard (7–14)	—	39,243	81–67	W1
149	September 16	Padres	16–0	**Anderson** (5–5)	Lyles (1–3)	—	48,247	82–67	W2
150	September 17	Padres	4–3	Yates (4–5)	**Holland** (3–6)	—	34,634	82–68	L1
151	September 19	@ Giants	4–3	Dyson (4–8)	**Rusin** (5–1)	—	40,686	82–69	L2
152	September 20	@ Giants	4–0	Moore (6–14)	**Chatwood** (8–13)	—	39,775	82–70	L3
153	September 21	@ Padres	3–0	Richard (8–14)	**Anderson** (5–6)	Hand (20)	30,944	82–71	L4
154	September 22	@ Padres	4–1	**Gray** (9–4)	Lyles (1–4)	**Holland** (41)	25,273	83–71	W1
155	September 23	@ Padres	5–0	Chacín (13–10)	**Bettis** (1–4)	—	33,899	83–72	L1
156	September 24	@ Padres	8–4	**Márquez** (11–7)	Perdomo (8–11)	—	28,339	84–72	W1
157	September 25	Marlins	5–4	Despaigne (1–3)	**Chatwood** (8–14)	Barraclough (1)	24,685	84–73	L1
158	September 26	Marlins	6–0	**Anderson** (6–6)	Urena (14–7)	—	30,409	85–73	W1
159	September 27	Marlins	15–9	**Gray** (10–4)	Conley (7–8)	—	27,497	86–73	W2
160	September 29	Dodgers	9–1	**Bettis** (2–4)	Ryu (5–9)	—	48,395	87–73	W3
161	September 30	Dodgers	5–3	Morrow (6–0)	**Chatwood** (8–15)	Jansen (41)	48,103	87–74	L1
162	October 1	Dodgers	3–6	Maeda (13–6)	**Freeland** (11–11)	Fields (2)	32,946	87–75	L2

Legend: = Win = Loss = Postponement
Bold = Rockies team member

== Postseason ==
=== Game log ===
2017 Postseason Game Log (0–1)
NL Wild Card Game (0–1)

#	Date	Opponent	Score	Win	Loss	Save	Attendance	Record
1	October 4	@ Diamondbacks	8–11	Chafin (1–0)	Gray (0–1)		48,803	0–1

=== Postseason rosters ===
Playoff rosters
National League Wild Card Game

- Pitchers: 37 Pat Neshek 38 Mike Dunn 44 Tyler Anderson 45 Scott Oberg 49 Antonio Senzatela 51 Jake McGee 52 Chris Rusin 54 Carlos Estévez 55 Jon Gray 56 Greg Holland
- Catchers: 14 Tony Wolters 21 Jonathan Lucroy 30 Ryan Hanigan
- Infielders: 2 Alexi Amarista 4 Pat Valaika 9 DJ LeMahieu 12 Mark Reynolds 27 Trevor Story 28 Nolan Arenado
- Outfielders: 3 Mike Tauchman 5 Carlos González 7 Raimel Tapia 8 Gerardo Parra 19 Charlie Blackmon 20 Ian Desmond

== Player stats ==
= Indicates team leader

=== Batting ===
==== Starters by position ====
Note: Pos = Position; G = Games played; AB = At bats; H = Hits; Avg. = Batting average; HR = Home runs; RBI = Runs batted in

Pos	Player	G	AB	H	Avg.	HR	RBI
C	Tony Wolters	83	229	55	.240	0	16
1B	Mark Reynolds	148	520	139	.267	30	97
2B	DJ LeMahieu	155	609	189	.310	8	64
SS	Trevor Story	145	503	120	.239	24	82
3B	Nolan Arenado	159	606	187	.309	37	130
LF	Gerardo Parra	115	392	121	.309	10	71
CF	Charlie Blackmon	159	644	213	.331	37	104
RF	Carlos González	136	470	123	.262	14	57

==== Other batters ====
Note: G = Games played; AB = At bats; H = Hits; Avg. = Batting average; HR = Home runs; RBI = Runs batted in

Player	G	AB	H	Avg.	HR	RBI
Ian Desmond	95	339	93	.274	7	40
Pat Valaika	110	182	47	.258	13	40
Alexi Amarista	96	168	40	.238	3	19
Raimel Tapia	70	160	46	.288	2	16
Jonathan Lucroy	46	142	44	.310	2	13
Ryan Hanigan	33	101	27	.267	2	12
Dustin Garneau	22	68	14	.206	1	6
Stephen Cardullo	15	28	4	.143	0	3
Mike Tauchman	31	27	6	.222	0	2
Tom Murphy	12	24	1	.042	0	1
Ryan McMahon	17	19	3	.158	0	1
Cristhian Adames	12	13	0	.000	0	0

=== Pitching ===
==== Starting pitchers ====
Note: G = Games pitched; IP = Innings pitched; W = Wins; L = Losses; ERA = Earned run average; SO = Strikeouts

Player	G	IP	W	L	ERA	SO
Germán Márquez	29	162.0	11	7	4.39	147
Kyle Freeland	33	156.0	11	11	4.10	107
Tyler Chatwood	33	147.2	8	15	4.69	120
Jon Gray	20	110.1	10	4	3.67	112
Tyler Anderson	17	86.0	6	6	4.81	81
Chad Bettis	9	46.1	2	4	5.05	30

==== Other pitchers ====
Note: G = Games pitched; IP = Innings pitched; W = Wins; L = Losses; ERA = Earned run average; SO = Strikeouts

Player	G	IP	W	L	ERA	SO
Antonio Senzatela	36	134.2	10	5	4.68	102
Jeff Hoffman	23	99.1	6	5	5.89	82

==== Relief pitchers ====
Note: G = Games pitched; W = Wins; L = Losses; SV = Saves; ERA = Earned run average; SO = Strikeouts

Player	G	W	L	SV	ERA	SO
Greg Holland	61	3	6	41	3.61	70
Mike Dunn	68	5	1	0	4.47	57
Scott Oberg	66	0	1	0	4.94	55
Adam Ottavino	63	2	3	0	5.06	63
Jake McGee	62	0	2	3	3.61	58
Chris Rusin	60	5	1	2	2.65	71
Carlos Estévez	35	5	0	0	5.57	31
Jordan Lyles	33	0	2	0	6.94	33
Pat Neshek	28	2	1	0	2.45	24
Chad Qualls	19	1	1	0	5.40	11
Zac Rosscup	9	0	0	0	5.14	10
Jairo Diaz	4	0	0	0	9.00	2
Shane Carle	3	0	0	0	6.75	4

== Awards and league leaders ==
=== Awards ===
- Fielding Bible Awards:
  - Nolan Arenado (3B)
  - DJ LeMahieu (2B)
- National League All-Stars:
  - Nolan Arenado (3B—starter)
  - Charlie Blackmon (CF—starter)
  - Greg Holland (RHP)
  - DJ LeMahieu (2B)
- National League Player of the Month Awards:
  - May: Charlie Blackmon
  - July: Nolan Arenado
- Players Choice for Majestic Athletic Always Game Award: Nolan Arenado
- Rawlings Gold Glove Awards:
  - Nolan Arenado (3B)
  - DJ LeMahieu (2B)
- Rawlings Platinum Glove Award for the National League: Nolan Arenado
- Silver Slugger Awards:
  - Nolan Arenado (3B)
  - Charlie Blackmon (CF)

=== National League leaders ===
==== Batting statistics ====
- Batting champion: Charlie Blackmon
- Doubles leader: Nolan Arenado
- Hits leader: Charlie Blackmon
- Runs scored leader: Charlie Blackmon
- Strikeouts leader: Trevor Story
- Triples leader: Charlie Blackmon
- Total bases leader: Charlie Blackmon
- Ref:

== Farm system ==
Level	Team	League	Manager
AAA	Albuquerque Isotopes	Pacific Coast League	Glenallen Hill
AA	Hartford Yard Goats	Eastern League	Jerry Weinstein
A-Advanced	Lancaster JetHawks	California League	Fred Ocasio
A	Asheville Tourists	South Atlantic League	Warren Schaeffer
A-Short Season	Boise Hawks	Northwest League	Scott Little
Rookie	Grand Junction Rockies	Pioneer League	Frank Gonzales

== See also ==
- List of Major League Baseball players to hit for the cycle

== Notes ==
Records
Preceded by 2016	Colorado Rockies seasons 2017	Succeeded by 2018
