= 2016 Colorado Rockies season =

2016 Colorado Rockies
- League: National League
- Division: West
- Ballpark: Coors Field
- City: Denver, Colorado
- Record: 75–87 (.463)
- Divisional place: 3rd
- Owners: Charles & Richard Monfort
- General manager: Jeff Bridich
- Manager: Walt Weiss
- Television: Root Sports Rocky Mountain (Drew Goodman, Jeff Huson, Ryan Spilborghs)
- Radio: KOA (English); Colorado Rockies Radio Network (Jack Corrigan, Jerry Schemmel); KNRV (Spanish) (Salvador Hernandez, Javier Olivas, Carlos Valdez)
- Stats: ESPN.com; Baseball Reference

The 2016 Colorado Rockies season was the franchise's 24th in Major League Baseball. It was the 22nd season the Rockies played their home games at Coors Field. The Rockies improve on their 68–94 record from 2015. After doing reasonably well most of the season and even posting a 54-53 (.505) record as late as August 3, they collapsed through the months of August and September, going an MLB-worst 21-34 in that span to finish 75-87, third place in the National League West, and missing the playoffs for the seventh consecutive season. At the end of the season Walt Weiss resigned his position as manager after 4 seasons at the helm.

== Offseason ==
- November 24, 2015: Tommy Kahnle was traded by the Colorado Rockies to the Chicago White Sox for Yency Almonte.
- December 8, 2015: Jason Motte and Chad Qualls were signed as free agents by the Colorado Rockies.
- December 16, 2015: Mark Reynolds was signed as a free agent by the Colorado Rockies.
- January 20, 2016: Gerardo Parra was signed as a free agent by the Colorado Rockies.
- January 28, 2016: Corey Dickerson was traded by the Colorado Rockies with Kevin Padlo to the Tampa Bay Rays for Jake McGee and Germán Márquez.
- February 18, 2016: Tony Wolters was selected off waivers from the Cleveland Indians.
- February 19, 2016: Christian Friedrich was released by the Colorado Rockies.
- March 4, 2016: Ryan Raburn was signed as a free agent by the Colorado Rockies.
- April 2, 2016: Kyle Parker was released by the Colorado Rockies.

== Regular season ==
=== Season standings ===
==== National League West ====
NL West
| Team | W | L | Pct. | GB | Home | Road |
|---|---|---|---|---|---|---|
| Los Angeles Dodgers | 91 | 71 | .562 | — | 53‍–‍28 | 38‍–‍43 |
| San Francisco Giants | 87 | 75 | .537 | 4 | 45‍–‍36 | 42‍–‍39 |
| Colorado Rockies | 75 | 87 | .463 | 16 | 42‍–‍39 | 33‍–‍48 |
| Arizona Diamondbacks | 69 | 93 | .426 | 22 | 33‍–‍48 | 36‍–‍45 |
| San Diego Padres | 68 | 94 | .420 | 23 | 39‍–‍42 | 29‍–‍52 |

==== National League Wild Card ====
Division leaders
| Team | W | L | Pct. |
|---|---|---|---|
| Chicago Cubs | 103 | 58 | .640 |
| Washington Nationals | 95 | 67 | .586 |
| Los Angeles Dodgers | 91 | 71 | .562 |

Wild Card teams (Top 2 teams qualify for postseason)
| Team | W | L | Pct. | GB |
|---|---|---|---|---|
| New York Mets | 87 | 75 | .537 | — |
| San Francisco Giants | 87 | 75 | .537 | — |
| St. Louis Cardinals | 86 | 76 | .531 | 1 |
| Miami Marlins | 79 | 82 | .491 | 7½ |
| Pittsburgh Pirates | 78 | 83 | .484 | 8½ |
| Colorado Rockies | 75 | 87 | .463 | 12 |
| Milwaukee Brewers | 73 | 89 | .451 | 14 |
| Philadelphia Phillies | 71 | 91 | .438 | 16 |
| Arizona Diamondbacks | 69 | 93 | .426 | 18 |
| Atlanta Braves | 68 | 93 | .422 | 18½ |
| San Diego Padres | 68 | 94 | .420 | 19 |
| Cincinnati Reds | 68 | 94 | .420 | 19 |

=== Record vs. opponents ===
2016 National League record Source: MLB Standings Grid – 2016
| Team | AZ | ATL | CHC | CIN | COL | LAD | MIA | MIL | NYM | PHI | PIT | SD | SF | STL | WSH | AL |
|---|---|---|---|---|---|---|---|---|---|---|---|---|---|---|---|---|
| Arizona | — | 5–2 | 2–5 | 3–3 | 10–9 | 7–12 | 2–4 | 3–4 | 5–1 | 4–3 | 1–5 | 10–9 | 6–13 | 4–3 | 2–5 | 5–15 |
| Atlanta | 2–5 | — | 3–3 | 3–4 | 1–6 | 1–5 | 11–7 | 2–5 | 10–9 | 11–8 | 3–4 | 4–2 | 3–4 | 2–4 | 4–15 | 8–12 |
| Chicago | 5–2 | 3–3 | — | 15–4 | 2–4 | 4–3 | 4–3 | 11–8 | 2–5 | 5–1 | 14–4 | 4–2 | 4–3 | 10–9 | 5–2 | 15–5 |
| Cincinnati | 3–3 | 4–3 | 4–15 | — | 5–2 | 2–5 | 3–4 | 11–8 | 0–6 | 4–2 | 9–10 | 3–4 | 3–3 | 9–10 | 3–4 | 5–15 |
| Colorado | 9–10 | 6–1 | 4–2 | 2–5 | — | 7–12 | 2–5 | 1–5 | 6–1 | 2–5 | 2–5 | 10–9 | 9–10 | 2–4 | 4–2 | 9–11 |
| Los Angeles | 12–7 | 5–1 | 3–4 | 5–2 | 12–7 | — | 1–6 | 5–2 | 4–3 | 4–2 | 2–5 | 11–8 | 8–11 | 4–2 | 5–1 | 10–10 |
| Miami | 4–2 | 7–11 | 3–4 | 4–3 | 5–2 | 6–1 | — | 4–2 | 7–12 | 9–10 | 6–1 | 3–3 | 2–4 | 4–3 | 9–10 | 6–14 |
| Milwaukee | 4–3 | 5–2 | 8–11 | 8–11 | 5–1 | 2–5 | 2–4 | — | 2–5 | 3–4 | 9–10 | 3–4 | 1–5 | 6–13 | 4–2 | 11–9 |
| New York | 1–5 | 9–10 | 5–2 | 6–0 | 1–6 | 3–4 | 12–7 | 5–2 | — | 12–7 | 3–3 | 4–3 | 4–3 | 3–3 | 7–12 | 12–8 |
| Philadelphia | 3–4 | 8–11 | 1–5 | 2–4 | 5–2 | 2–4 | 10–9 | 4–3 | 7–12 | — | 3–4 | 5–2 | 3–3 | 2–5 | 5–14 | 11–9 |
| Pittsburgh | 5–1 | 4–3 | 4–14 | 10–9 | 5–2 | 5–2 | 1–6 | 10–9 | 3–3 | 4–3 | — | 3–3 | 4–3 | 9–10 | 2–4 | 9–11 |
| San Diego | 9–10 | 2–4 | 2–4 | 4–3 | 9–10 | 8–11 | 3–3 | 4–3 | 3–4 | 2–5 | 3–3 | — | 8–11 | 1–6 | 4–3 | 6–14 |
| San Francisco | 13–6 | 4–3 | 3–4 | 3–3 | 10–9 | 11–8 | 4–2 | 5–1 | 3–4 | 3–3 | 3–4 | 11–8 | — | 3–4 | 3–4 | 8–12 |
| St. Louis | 3–4 | 4–2 | 9–10 | 10–9 | 4–2 | 2–4 | 3–4 | 13–6 | 3–3 | 5–2 | 10–9 | 6–1 | 4–3 | — | 2–5 | 8–12 |
| Washington | 5–2 | 15–4 | 2–5 | 4–3 | 2–4 | 1–5 | 10–9 | 2–4 | 12–7 | 14–5 | 4–2 | 3–4 | 4–3 | 5–2 | — | 12–8 |

=== Transactions ===
- April 25, 2016: David Hale was selected off waivers by the Baltimore Orioles from the Colorado Rockies.
- June 23, 2016: José Reyes was released by the Colorado Rockies.
- September 9, 2016: Brandon Barnes was released by the Colorado Rockies.

=== Major League Debuts ===
- Batters
  - Trevor Story (Apr 4)
  - Tony Wolters (Apr 5)
  - David Dahl (Jul 25)
  - Stephen Cardullo (Aug 26)
  - Raimel Tapia (Sep 2)
  - Pat Valaika (Sep 6)
  - Jordan Patterson (Sep 8)
- Pitchers
  - Carlos Estévez (Apr 23)
  - Tyler Anderson (Jun 12)
  - Matt Carasiti (Aug 12)
  - Jeff Hoffman (Aug 20)
  - Germán Márquez (Sep 8)

== Roster ==
2016 Colorado Rockies
**Roster**
| **Pitchers**: 44 Tyler Anderson; 36 Christian Bergman; 35 Chad Bettis; 31 Eddie Butler; 61 Matt Carasiti; 46 Miguel Castro; 32 Tyler Chatwood; 29 Jorge de la Rosa; 54 Carlos Estévez; 58 Yohan Flande; 62 Gonzalez Germen; 55 Jon Gray; 65 Jason Gurka; 61 David Hale; 34 Jeff Hoffman; 48 Boone Logan; 24 Jordan Lyles; 67 Germán Márquez; 51 Jake McGee; 60 Justin Miller; 30 Jason Motte; 45 Scott Oberg; 0 Adam Ottavino; 50 Chad Qualls; 52 Chris Rusin | **Catchers**: 13 Dustin Garneau; 4 Nick Hundley; 23 Tom Murphy; 14 Tony Wolters; **Infielders**: 18 Cristhian Adames; 28 Nolan Arenado; 3 Daniel Descalso; 9 DJ LeMahieu; 10 Ben Paulsen; 12 Mark Reynolds; 27 Trevor Story; 74 Pat Valaika; **Outfielders**: 1 Brandon Barnes; 19 Charlie Blackmon; 65 Stephen Cardullo; 26 David Dahl; 5 Carlos González; 8 Gerardo Parra; 72 Jordan Patterson; 6 Ryan Raburn; 68 Raimel Tapia | **Manager**: 22 Walt Weiss; **Coaches**: 39 Stu Cole (third base); 25 Blake Doyle (hitting); 56 Steve Foster (pitching); 40 Darren Holmes (bullpen); 53 Rene Lachemann (catching); 66 Aaron Muñoz (bullpen catcher); 11 Tom Runnells (bench); 21 Eric Young (first base) |

=== Game log ===
Legend
| | Rockies win |
| | Rockies loss |
| | Postponement |
| **Bold** | Rockies team member |

2016 Game Log
April (11–12)

| # | Date | Opponent | Score | Win | Loss | Save | Attendance | Record |
|---|---|---|---|---|---|---|---|---|
| 1 | April 4 | @ Diamondbacks | 10–5 | **Miller** (1–0) | Greinke (0–1) | | 48,165 | 1–0 |
| 2 | April 5 | @ Diamondbacks | 11–6 | Clippard (1–0) | **Bergman** (0–1) | | 21,830 | 1–1 |
| 3 | April 6 | @ Diamondbacks | 4–3 | **Chatwood** (1–0) | Corbin (0–1) | **McGee** (1) | 18,572 | 2–1 |
| 4 | April 8 | Padres | 13–6 | Erlin (1–0) | **Lyles** (0–1) | | 49,360 | 2–2 |
| 5 | April 9 | Padres | 16–3 | Pomeranz (1–0) | **De La Rosa** (0–1) | | 35,177 | 2–3 |
| 6 | April 10 | Padres | 6–3 | **Bettis** (1–0) | Shields (0–2) | **McGee** (2) | 27,587 | 3–3 |
| 7 | April 12 | Giants | 7–2 | Samardzija (1–0) | **Chatwood** (1–1) | | 20,814 | 3–4 |
| 8 | April 13 | Giants | 10–6 | **Rusin** (1–0) | Peavy (0–1) | | 21,891 | 4–4 |
| 9 | April 14 | Giants | 11–6 | **De La Rosa** (1–1) | Cain (0–1) | | 21,226 | 5–4 |
| 10 | April 15 | @ Cubs | 6–1 | **Bettis** (2–0) | Hendricks (1–1) | | 34,437 | 6–4 |
| 11 | April 16 | @ Cubs | 6–2 | Arrieta (3–0) | **Bergman** (0–2) | | 41,702 | 6–5 |
| 12 | April 17 | @ Cubs | 2–0 | **Chatwood** (2–1) | Lester (1–1) | **McGee** (3) | 41,678 | 7–5 |
| 13 | April 18 | @ Reds | 5–1 | **Lyles** (1–1) | Ohlendorf (2–2) | | 12,777 | 8–5 |
| 14 | April 19 | @ Reds | 4–3 | Stephenson (2–0) | **De La Rosa** (1–2) | | 13,240 | 8–6 |
| 15 | April 20 | @ Reds | 6–5 | Ohlendorf (3–2) | **Bergman** (0–3) | | 12,979 | 8–7 |
| 16 | April 22 | Dodgers | 7–5 | **Qualls** (1–0) | Hatcher (2–2) | **McGee** (4) | 37,153 | 9–7 |
| 17 | April 23 | Dodgers | 4–1 | Maeda (3–0) | **Chatwood** (2–2) | Jansen (8) | 42,179 | 9–8 |
| 18 | April 24 | Dodgers | 12–10 | Blanton (2–1) | **McGee** (0–1) | Jansen (9) | 35,962 | 9–9 |
| 19 | April 25 | Pirates | 6–1 | Locke (1–2) | **Bettis** (2–1) | Schugel (1) | 20,674 | 9–10 |
| 20 | April 26 | Pirates | 9–4 | Cole (2–2) | **De La Rosa** (1–3) | | 20,227 | 9–11 |
| 21 | April 27 | Pirates | 9–8 (12) | Lobstein (2–0) | **Estévez** (0–1) | Melancon (5) | 21,354 | 9–12 |
| – | April 28 | Pirates | Postponed (rain/snow) Rescheduled for June 9 | | | | | |
| 22 | April 29 | @ Diamondbacks | 9–0 | **Chatwood** (3–2) | Ray (1–1) | | 23,004 | 10–12 |
| 23 | April 30 | @ Diamondbacks | 5–2 | **Qualls** (2–0) | Ziegler (1–1) | **McGee** (5) | 32,987 | 11–12 |

May (13–15)

| # | Date | Opponent | Score | Win | Loss | Save | Attendance | Record |
|---|---|---|---|---|---|---|---|---|
| 24 | May 1 | @ Diamondbacks | 6–3 | **Bettis** (3–1) | Miller (0–3) | **McGee** (6) | 25,458 | 12–12 |
| 25 | May 2 | @ Padres | 2–1 | Shields (1–4) | **Gray** (0–1) | Rodney (5) | 19,013 | 12–13 |
| 26 | May 3 | @ Padres | 6–3 | Cashner (2–2) | **Butler** (0–1) | Rodney (6) | 20,394 | 12–14 |
| 27 | May 4 | @ Padres | 2–0 | **Chatwood** (4–2) | Vargas (0–1) | **McGee** (7) | 20,038 | 13–14 |
| 28 | May 5 | @ Giants | 17–7 | **Bergman** (1–3) | Cain (0–4) | | 41,477 | 14–14 |
| 29 | May 6 | @ Giants | 6–4 | Bumgarner (4–2) | **Bettis** (3–2) | Casilla (7) | 41,358 | 14–15 |
| 30 | May 7 | @ Giants | 2–1 (13) | Law (1–0) | **Miller** (1–1) | | 41,590 | 14–16 |
| 31 | May 8 | @ Giants | 2–0 | **Butler** (1–1) | Samardzija (4–2) | **McGee** (8) | 41,593 | 15–16 |
| 32 | May 9 | Diamondbacks | 10–5 | Bradley (1–0) | **Chatwood** (4–3) | | 22,053 | 15–17 |
| 33 | May 10 | Diamondbacks | 5–1 | De La Rosa (4–4) | **Rusin** (1–1) | | 23,363 | 15–18 |
| 34 | May 11 | Diamondbacks | 8–7 | **Germen** (1–0) | Clippard (2–1) | **McGee** (9) | 34,890 | 16–18 |
| 35 | May 13 | Mets | 5–2 | **Gray** (1–1) | Harvey (3–5) | **McGee** (10) | 38,712 | 17–18 |
| 36 | May 14 | Mets | 7–4 | **Butler** (2–1) | Verrett (3–1) | **McGee** (11) | 34,362 | 18–18 |
| 37 | May 15 | Mets | 4–3 | **Chatwood** (5–3) | Henderson (0–2) | **McGee** (12) | 36,901 | 19–18 |
| 38 | May 17 | @ Cardinals | 3–1 | **Bettis** (4–2) | García (3–3) | **McGee** (13) | 41,109 | 20–18 |
| 39 | May 18 | @ Cardinals | 2–0 | Wainwright (4–3) | **Rusin** (1–2) | Rosenthal (8) | 42,618 | 20–19 |
| 40 | May 19 | @ Cardinals | 13–7 | Lyons (1–0) | **Gray** (1–2) | | 43,683 | 20–20 |
| 41 | May 20 | @ Pirates | 2–1 | Cole (5–3) | **Butler** (2–2) | Melancon (14) | 23,248 | 20–21 |
| 42 | May 21 | @ Pirates | 5–1 | **Estévez** (1–1) | Melancon (0–1) | | 31,352 | 21–21 |
| – | May 22 | @ Pirates | Postponed (rain) Rescheduled for May 23 | | | | | |
| 43 | May 23 | @ Pirates | 6–3 | Boscán (1–0) | **Lyles** (1–2) | Melancon (15) | 34,529 | 21–22 |
| 44 | May 24 | @ Red Sox | 8–3 | Price (7–1) | **De La Rosa** (1–4) | | 36,123 | 21–23 |
| 45 | May 25 | @ Red Sox | 10–3 | Wright (4–4) | **Bettis** (4–3) | | 36,430 | 21–24 |
| 46 | May 26 | @ Red Sox | 8–2 | **Gray** (2–2) | Buchholz (2–5) | | 36,162 | 22–24 |
| 47 | May 27 | Giants | 5–2 | **Chatwood** (6–3) | Suárez (1–1) | **McGee** (14) | 32,901 | 23–24 |
| 48 | May 28 | Giants | 10–5 | Gearrin (1–0) | **Estévez** (1–2) | | 39,253 | 23–25 |
| 49 | May 29 | Giants | 8–3 | Cueto (8–1) | **Rusin** (1–3) | | 42,307 | 23–26 |
| 50 | May 30 | Reds | 11–8 | Straily (3–2) | **Bettis** (4–4) | Ramirez (1) | 30,608 | 23–27 |
| 51 | May 31 | Reds | 17–4 | **Gray** (3–2) | Moscot (0–3) | | 20,448 | 24–27 |

June (13–14)

| # | Date | Opponent | Score | Win | Loss | Save | Attendance | Record |
|---|---|---|---|---|---|---|---|---|
| 52 | June 1 | Reds | 7–2 | Lamb (1–3) | **Chatwood** (6–4) | | 23,612 | 24–28 |
| 53 | June 2 | Reds | 11–4 | Simón (2–5) | **Butler** (2–3) | | 28,080 | 24–29 |
| 54 | June 3 | @ Padres | 4–0 | Pomeranz (5–5) | **Rusin** (1–4) | | 21,588 | 24–30 |
| 55 | June 4 | @ Padres | 4–3 | Cashner (3–5) | **Bettis** (4–5) | Rodney (11) | 25,503 | 24–31 |
| 56 | June 5 | @ Padres | 10–3 | **Gray** (4–2) | Perdomo (1–2) | | 26,206 | 25–31 |
| 57 | June 6 | @ Dodgers | 6–1 | **Chatwood** (7–4) | Bolsinger (1–3) | | 38,964 | 26–31 |
| 58 | June 7 | @ Dodgers | 4–3 | Jansen (2–1) | **Estévez** (1–3) | | 40,525 | 26–32 |
| 59 | June 8 | @ Dodgers | 1–0 | **Rusin** (2–4) | Maeda (5–4) | **McGee** (15) | 41,324 | 27–32 |
| 60 | June 9 | Pirates | 11–5 | **De La Rosa** (2–4) | Locke (5–4) | | 24,678 | 28–32 |
| 61 | June 10 | Padres | 7–5 | Quackenbush (3–2) | **McGee** (0–2) | Rodney (12) | 32,663 | 28–33 |
| 62 | June 11 | Padres | 5–3 | **Chatwood** (8–4) | Johnson (0–3) | **Estévez** (1) | 29,078 | 29–33 |
| 63 | June 12 | Padres | 2–1 | **Germen** (2–0) | Quackenbush (3–3) | **Logan** (1) | 32,946 | 30–33 |
| 64 | June 14 | Yankees | 13–10 | **De La Rosa** (3–4) | Eovaldi (6–3) | **Estévez** (2) | 46,335 | 31–33 |
| 65 | June 15 | Yankees | 6–3 | **Bettis** (5–5) | Nova (5–4) | **Estévez** (3) | 40,093 | 32–33 |
| 66 | June 17 | @ Marlins | 5–1 | Wittgren (2–1) | **Gray** (4–3) | | 19,767 | 32–34 |
| 67 | June 18 | @ Marlins | 9–6 | McGowan (1–2) | **Butler** (2–4) | Ramos (21) | 19,655 | 32–35 |
| 68 | June 19 | @ Marlins | 3–0 | Koehler (6–6) | **Anderson** (0–1) | Ramos (22) | 24,993 | 32–36 |
| 69 | June 20 | @ Marlins | 5–3 | **De La Rosa** (4–4) | Ellington (1–1) | **Estévez** (4) | 18,187 | 33–36 |
| 70 | June 21 | @ Yankees | 8–4 | **Bettis** (6–5) | Nova (5–5) | | 34,760 | 34–36 |
| 71 | June 22 | @ Yankees | 9–8 | Chapman (1–0) | **Motte** (0–1) | | 40,104 | 34–37 |
| 72 | June 23 | Diamondbacks | 7–6 | Ziegler (2–2) | **Estévez** (1–4) | | 36,558 | 34–38 |
| 73 | June 24 | Diamondbacks | 10–9 | Collmenter (1–0) | **Estévez** (1–5) | Ziegler (16) | 35,216 | 34–39 |
| 74 | June 25 | Diamondbacks | 11–6 | **De La Rosa** (5–4) | Miller (2–7) | **Germen** (1) | 33,337 | 35–39 |
| 75 | June 26 | Diamondbacks | 9–7 | **Estévez** (2–5) | Bracho (0–1) | | 32,435 | 36–39 |
| 76 | June 27 | Blue Jays | 9–5 | **Gray** (5–3) | Storen (1–3) | | 36,419 | 37–39 |
| 77 | June 28 | Blue Jays | 14–9 | Happ (10–3) | **Butler** (2–5) | | 33,917 | 37–40 |
| 78 | June 29 | Blue Jays | 5–3 | Sanchez (8–1) | **Anderson** (0–2) | | 38,412 | 37–41 |

July (15–12)

| # | Date | Opponent | Score | Win | Loss | Save | Attendance | Record |
|---|---|---|---|---|---|---|---|---|
| 79 | July 1 | @ Dodgers | 5–0 | Norris (4–7) | **De La Rosa** (5–5) | | 43,644 | 37–42 |
| 80 | July 2 | @ Dodgers | 6–1 | Kazmir (7–3) | **Bettis** (6–6) | | 46,608 | 37–43 |
| 81 | July 3 | @ Dodgers | 4–1 | McCarthy (1–0) | **Gray** (5–4) | Jansen (24) | 41,836 | 37–44 |
| 82 | July 4 | @ Giants | 3–1 | Peavy (5–7) | **Anderson** (0–3) | Casilla (20) | 41,874 | 37–45 |
| 83 | July 5 | @ Giants | 7–3 | **Lyles** (2–2) | Gearrin (3–1) | | 41,753 | 38–45 |
| 84 | July 6 | @ Giants | 5–1 | Cueto (13–1) | **De La Rosa** (5–6) | | 42,076 | 38–46 |
| 85 | July 7 | Phillies | 11–2 | **Bettis** (7–6) | Morgan (1–7) | | 35,250 | 39–46 |
| 86 | July 8 | Phillies | 5–3 | Velasquez (8–2) | **McGee** (0–3) | Gómez (24) | 42,335 | 39–47 |
| 87 | July 9 | Phillies | 8–3 | **Anderson** (1–3) | Eickhoff (6–10) | **Lyles** (1) | 48,105 | 40–47 |
| 88 | July 10 | Phillies | 10–3 | Eflin (2–2) | **Chatwood** (8–5) | | 32,113 | 40–48 |
**87th All-Star Game in San Diego, California**
| 89 | July 15 | @ Braves | 11–2 | **De La Rosa** (6–6) | Harrell (1–1) | | 27,236 | 41–48 |
| 90 | July 16 | @ Braves | 4–3 | **Logan** (1–0) | Johnson (1–5) | **Estévez** (5) | 28,393 | 42–48 |
| 91 | July 17 | @ Braves | 1–0 | Johnson (2–5) | **Germen** (2–1) | | 18,873 | 42–49 |
| 92 | July 18 | Rays | 7–4 | **Anderson** (2–3) | Smyly (2–11) | **Estévez** (6) | 30,601 | 43–49 |
| 93 | July 19 | Rays | 10–1 | Snell (2–4) | **Chatwood** (8–6) | Andriese (1) | 33,061 | 43–50 |
| 94 | July 20 | Rays | 11–3 | Archer (5–13) | **De La Rosa** (6–7) | | 31,456 | 43–51 |
| 95 | July 21 | Braves | 7–3 | **Bettis** (8–6) | Foltynewicz (3–4) | **Estévez** (7) | 36,527 | 44–51 |
| 96 | July 22 | Braves | 4–3 | **Gray** (6–4) | De La Cruz (0–3) | **Estévez** (8) | 35,880 | 45–51 |
| 97 | July 23 | Braves | 8–4 | **Anderson** (3–3) | Wisler (4–10) | | 46,195 | 46–51 |
| 98 | July 24 | Braves | 7–2 | **Chatwood** (9–6) | Jenkins (0–2) | | 34,695 | 47–51 |
| 99 | July 25 | @ Orioles | 3–2(10) | Roe (1–0) | **Lyles** (2–3) | | 19,361 | 47–52 |
| 100 | July 26 | @ Orioles | 6–3 | **Bettis** (9–6) | Tillman (14–3) | **Estévez** (9) | 23,677 | 48–52 |
| 101 | July 27 | @ Orioles | 3–1 | **Gray** (7–4) | Bundy (3–3) | **Estévez** (10) | 20,324 | 49–52 |
| 102 | July 28 | @ Mets | 2–1 | **Lyles** (3–3) | Familia (2–3) | **Estévez** (11) | 38,292 | 50–52 |
| 103 | July 29 | @ Mets | 6–1 | **Chatwood** (10–6) | Matz (8–7) | | 40,035 | 51–52 |
| 104 | July 30 | @ Mets | 7–2 | **De La Rosa** (7–7) | Colón (9–6) | | 42,207 | 52–52 |
| 105 | July 31 | @ Mets | 6–4 | Blevins (4–1) | **Logan** (1–1) | Familia (37) | 36,279 | 52–53 |

August (12–16)

| # | Date | Opponent | Score | Win | Loss | Save | Attendance | Record |
|---|---|---|---|---|---|---|---|---|
| 106 | August 2 | Dodgers | 7–3 | **Gray** (8–4) | McCarthy (2–2) | | 32,607 | 53–53 |
| 107 | August 3 | Dodgers | 12–2 | **Anderson** (4–3) | Stewart (0–2) | | 28,682 | 54–53 |
| 108 | August 4 | Dodgers | 4–2 | Maeda (10–7) | **Chatwood** (10–7) | Jansen (32) | 31,117 | 54–54 |
| 109 | August 5 | Marlins | 5–3 | Ellington (2–1) | **Estévez** (2–6) | Ramos (32) | 27,888 | 54–55 |
| 110 | August 6 | Marlins | 12–6 | **Bettis** (10–6) | Cashner (4–8) | | 37,699 | 55–55 |
| 111 | August 7 | Marlins | 10–7 | Conley (8–6) | **Gray** (8–5) | Rodney (18) | 40,875 | 55–56 |
| 112 | August 8 | Rangers | 4–3 | Kela (3–1) | **Estévez** (2–7) | Diekman (3) | 31,768 | 55–57 |
| 113 | August 9 | Rangers | 7–5 | Claudio (3–1) | **Oberg** (0–1) | Dyson (25) | 27,671 | 55–58 |
| 114 | August 10 | @ Rangers | 5–4 | Diekman (3–1) | **Logan** (1–2) | Bush (1) | 29,866 | 55–59 |
| 115 | August 11 | @ Rangers | 12–9 | **Oberg** (1–1) | Diekman (3–2) | **Ottavino** (1) | 20,720 | 56–59 |
| 116 | August 12 | @ Phillies | 10–6 | Thompson (1–1) | **Gray** (8–6) | | 23,600 | 56–60 |
| 117 | August 13 | @ Phillies | 6–3 | Eickhoff (8–12) | **Anderson** (4–4) | Gómez (30) | 23,203 | 56–61 |
| 118 | August 14 | @ Phillies | 7–6 | González (1–2) | **Chatwood** (10–8) | Gómez (31) | 20,068 | 56–62 |
| 119 | August 15 | Nationals | 5–4 | Solis (2–3) | **Lyles** (3–4) | Melancon (34) | 27,818 | 56–63 |
| 120 | August 16 | Nationals | 6–2 | **Rusin** (3–4) | Petit (3–3) | | 29,209 | 57–63 |
| 121 | August 17 | Nationals | 12–10 | **Logan** (2–2) | Strasburg (15–4) | **Oberg** (1) | 25,308 | 58–63 |
| 122 | August 19 | Cubs | 7–6 (11) | **Carasiti** (1–0) | Chapman (3–1) | | 43,950 | 59–63 |
| 123 | August 20 | Cubs | 9–2 | Cahill (3–3) | **Hoffman** (0–1) | | 48,113 | 59–64 |
| 124 | August 21 | Cubs | 11–4 | **De La Rosa** (8–7) | Hammel (13–6) | | 46,206 | 60–64 |
| 125 | August 22 | @ Brewers | 4–2 | Nelson (7–13) | **Bettis** (10–7) | Thornburg (5) | 20,458 | 60–65 |
| 126 | August 23 | @ Brewers | 6–4 | Suter (1–1) | **Logan** (2–3) | Knebel (1) | 21,460 | 60–66 |
| 127 | August 24 | @ Brewers | 7–1 | Davies (10–6) | **Anderson** (4–5) | | 26,702 | 60–67 |
| 128 | August 26 | @ Nationals | 5–8 | Gonzalez (9–9) | **Hoffman** (0–2) | | 33,433 | 60–68 |
| 129 | August 27 | @ Nationals | 9–4 (11) | **McGee** (1–3) | Petit (3–4) | | 27,901 | 61–68 |
| 130 | August 28 | @ Nationals | 5–3 | **Bettis** (11–7) | Giolito (0–1) | **Ottavino** (2) | 28,124 | 62–68 |
| 131 | August 29 | Dodgers | 8–1 | **Gray** (9–6) | Maeda (13–8) | | 24,308 | 63–68 |
| – | August 30 | Dodgers | Postponed (rain) Rescheduled for August 31 | | | | | |
| 132 | August 31 | Dodgers | 7–0 | **Anderson** (5–5) | Stripling (3–6) | | 24,790 | 64–68 |
| 133 | August 31 | Dodgers | 10–8 | Avilán (1–0) | **Ottavino** (0–1) | Jansen (40) | 22,683 | 64–69 |

September (11–16)

| # | Date | Opponent | Score | Win | Loss | Save | Attendance | Record |
|---|---|---|---|---|---|---|---|---|
| 134 | September 2 | Diamondbacks | 14–7 | **Estévez** (3–7) | Burgos (1–2) | | 23,002 | 65–69 |
| 135 | September 3 | Diamondbacks | 9–4 | Shipley (3–3) | **Chatwood** (10–9) | | 30,280 | 65–70 |
| 136 | September 4 | Diamondbacks | 8–5 | Bradley (6–8) | **Gray** (9–7) | | 31,981 | 65–71 |
| 137 | September 5 | Giants | 6–0 | **Bettis** (12–7) | Moore (9–11) | | 26,574 | 66–71 |
| 138 | September 6 | Giants | 3–2 | López (1–2) | **Ottavino** (0–2) | Casilla (31) | 22,437 | 66–72 |
| 139 | September 7 | Giants | 6–5 | **Lyles** (4–4) | Osich (1–3) | | 23,961 | 67–72 |
| 140 | September 8 | @ Padres | 14–1 | Richard (2–3) | **Hoffman** (0–3) | | 26,053 | 67–73 |
| 141 | September 9 | @ Padres | 4–1 | **Chatwood** (11–9) | Perdomo (7–9) | **Ottavino** (3) | 25,015 | 68–73 |
| 142 | September 10 | @ Padres | 6–3 | Friedrich (5–10) | **Gray** (9–8) | Maurer (9) | 23,719 | 68–74 |
| 143 | September 11 | @ Padres | 3–2 (10) | **McGee** (2–3) | Quackenbush (7–6) | **Ottavino** (4) | 25,133 | 69–74 |
| 144 | September 12 | @ Diamondbacks | 12–9 | Delgado (4–1) | **Lyles** (4–5) | Hudson (3) | 20,637 | 69–75 |
| 145 | September 13 | @ Diamondbacks | 11–4 | Ray (8–13) | **De La Rosa** (8–8) | Koch (1) | 20,897 | 69–76 |
| 146 | September 14 | @ Diamondbacks | 11–6 | Shipley (4–3) | **Hoffman** (0–4) | | 19,801 | 69–77 |
| 147 | September 16 | Padres | 8–7 | **Ottavino** (1–2) | Maurer (0–5) | | 30,451 | 70–77 |
| 148 | September 17 | Padres | 8–0 | **Gray** (10–8) | Jackson (4–6) | | 34,724 | 71–77 |
| 149 | September 18 | Padres | 6–3 | **Bettis** (13–7) | Cosart (0–4) | **Ottavino** (5) | 25,811 | 72–77 |
| 150 | September 19 | Cardinals | 5–3 | Martínez (15–8) | **Anderson** (5–6) | Siegrist (3) | 26,783 | 72–78 |
| 151 | September 20 | Cardinals | 10–5 | Wainwright (12–9) | **De La Rosa** (8–9) | | 28,665 | 72–79 |
| 152 | September 21 | Cardinals | 11–1 | **Márquez** (1–0) | Weaver (1–4) | | 26,099 | 73–79 |
| 153 | September 22 | @ Dodgers | 7–4 | Avilán (3–0) | **Logan** (2–4) | Jansen (46) | 48,344 | 73–80 |
| 154 | September 23 | @ Dodgers | 5–2 | Stripling (5–8) | **Gray** (10–9) | Jansen (47) | 52,320 | 73–81 |
| 155 | September 24 | @ Dodgers | 14–1 | Kershaw (12–3) | **Bettis** (13–8) | | 53,299 | 73–82 |
| 156 | September 25 | @ Dodgers | 4–3 | Blanton (7–2) | **Logan** (2–5) | | 51,962 | 73–83 |
| 157 | September 27 | @ Giants | 12–3 | Moore (12–12) | **Márquez** (1–1) | | 41,582 | 73–84 |
| 158 | September 28 | @ Giants | 2–0 | **Chatwood** (12–9) | Samardzija (12–11) | **Ottavino** (6) | 41,426 | 74–84 |
| 159 | September 29 | @ Giants | 7–2 | Cueto (18–5) | **Gray** (10–10) | | 41,275 | 74–85 |
| 160 | September 30 | Brewers | 4–1 | **Bettis** (14–8) | Suter (2–2) | **Ottavino** (7) | 41,068 | 75–85 |

October (0–2)

| # | Date | Opponent | Score | Win | Loss | Save | Attendance | Record |
|---|---|---|---|---|---|---|---|---|
| 161 | October 1 | Brewers | 4–3 (10) | Thornburg (7–5) | **Ottavino** (1–3) | Barnes (1) | 32,835 | 75–86 |
| 162 | October 2 | Brewers | 6–4 (10) | Thornburg (8–5) | **Rusin** (3–5) | Knebel (2) | 27,762 | 75–87 |

== Player stats ==
| = Indicates team leader |

=== Batting ===
==== Starters by position ====
Note: Pos = Position; G = Games played; AB = At bats; H = Hits; Avg. = Batting average; HR = Home runs; RBI = Runs batted in

| Pos | Player | G | AB | H | Avg. | HR | RBI |
|---|---|---|---|---|---|---|---|
| C | Nick Hundley | 83 | 289 | 75 | .260 | 10 | 48 |
| 1B | Mark Reynolds | 118 | 393 | 111 | .282 | 14 | 53 |
| 2B | DJ LeMahieu | 146 | 552 | 192 | .348 | 11 | 66 |
| SS | Trevor Story | 97 | 372 | 101 | .272 | 27 | 72 |
| 3B | Nolan Arenado | 160 | 618 | 182 | .294 | 41 | 133 |
| LF | Gerardo Parra | 102 | 368 | 93 | .253 | 7 | 39 |
| CF | Charlie Blackmon | 143 | 578 | 187 | .324 | 29 | 82 |
| RF | Carlos González | 150 | 584 | 174 | .298 | 25 | 100 |

==== Other batters ====
Note: G = Games played; AB = At bats; H = Hits; Avg. = Batting average; HR = Home runs; RBI = Runs batted in

| Player | G | AB | H | Avg. | HR | RBI |
|---|---|---|---|---|---|---|
| Daniel Descalso | 99 | 250 | 66 | .264 | 8 | 38 |
| Cristhian Adames | 121 | 225 | 49 | .218 | 2 | 17 |
| Ryan Raburn | 113 | 223 | 49 | .220 | 9 | 30 |
| David Dahl | 63 | 222 | 70 | .315 | 7 | 24 |
| Tony Wolters | 71 | 205 | 53 | .259 | 3 | 30 |
| Brandon Barnes | 48 | 100 | 22 | .220 | 0 | 8 |
| Ben Paulsen | 39 | 92 | 20 | .217 | 1 | 11 |
| Dustin Garneau | 24 | 68 | 16 | .235 | 1 | 6 |
| Stephen Cardullo | 27 | 56 | 12 | .214 | 2 | 6 |
| Tom Murphy | 21 | 44 | 12 | .273 | 5 | 13 |
| Raimel Tapia | 22 | 38 | 10 | .263 | 0 | 3 |
| Pat Valaika | 13 | 19 | 5 | .263 | 1 | 2 |
| Jordan Patterson | 10 | 18 | 8 | .444 | 0 | 2 |
| Rafael Ynoa | 3 | 5 | 0 | .000 | 0 | 0 |

=== Pitching ===
==== Starting pitchers ====
Note: G = Games pitched; IP = Innings pitched; W = Wins; L = Losses; ERA = Earned run average; SO = Strikeouts

| Player | G | IP | W | L | ERA | SO |
|---|---|---|---|---|---|---|
| Chad Bettis | 32 | 186.0 | 14 | 8 | 4.79 | 138 |
| Jon Gray | 29 | 168.0 | 10 | 10 | 4.61 | 185 |
| Tyler Chatwood | 27 | 158.0 | 12 | 9 | 3.87 | 117 |
| Jorge De La Rosa | 27 | 134.0 | 8 | 9 | 5.51 | 108 |
| Tyler Anderson | 19 | 114.1 | 5 | 6 | 3.54 | 99 |

==== Other pitchers ====
Note: G = Games pitched; IP = Innings pitched; W = Wins; L = Losses; ERA = Earned run average; SO = Strikeouts

| Player | G | IP | W | L | ERA | SO |
|---|---|---|---|---|---|---|
| Chris Rusin | 29 | 84.1 | 3 | 5 | 3.74 | 69 |
| Eddie Butler | 17 | 64.0 | 2 | 5 | 7.17 | 47 |
| Jeff Hoffman | 8 | 31.1 | 0 | 4 | 4.88 | 22 |
| Germán Márquez | 6 | 20.2 | 1 | 1 | 5.23 | 15 |

==== Relief pitchers ====
Note: G = Games pitched; W = Wins; L = Losses; SV = Saves; ERA = Earned run average; SO = Strikeouts

| Player | G | W | L | SV | ERA | SO |
|---|---|---|---|---|---|---|
| Jake McGee | 57 | 2 | 3 | 15 | 4.73 | 38 |
| Boone Logan | 66 | 2 | 5 | 1 | 3.69 | 57 |
| Carlos Estévez | 63 | 3 | 7 | 11 | 5.24 | 59 |
| Chad Qualls | 44 | 2 | 0 | 0 | 5.23 | 22 |
| Jordan Lyles | 40 | 4 | 5 | 1 | 5.83 | 32 |
| Justin Miller | 40 | 1 | 1 | 0 | 5.70 | 45 |
| Gonzalez Germen | 40 | 2 | 1 | 1 | 5.31 | 32 |
| Adam Ottavino | 34 | 1 | 3 | 7 | 2.67 | 35 |
| Jason Motte | 30 | 0 | 1 | 0 | 4.94 | 24 |
| Scott Oberg | 24 | 1 | 1 | 1 | 5.19 | 20 |
| Matt Carasiti | 19 | 1 | 0 | 0 | 9.19 | 17 |
| Miguel Castro | 19 | 0 | 0 | 0 | 6.14 | 12 |
| Christian Bergman | 15 | 1 | 3 | 0 | 8.39 | 22 |
| Jason Gurka | 6 | 0 | 0 | 0 | 9.31 | 7 |
| Yohan Flande | 2 | 0 | 0 | 0 | 12.27 | 0 |
| David Hale | 2 | 0 | 0 | 0 | 13.50 | 1 |

== Notes ==
- On May 5, 2016, the Rockies scored 13 runs in the top of the 5th inning in a game against the San Francisco Giants at AT&T Park. Prior to that game, no team had ever scored that many runs in an inning in that ballpark. Those 13 runs also set new franchise records for most runs scored in an inning on the road (previously 9 in St. Louis in 2009) and for most runs scored in any inning (previously 12 against the Cubs in Denver in 2010). 13 runs also tied the record set by the Arizona Diamondbacks in 2010 for most runs scored by any team in any inning.
- On June 20, 2016, in a game against the Miami Marlins at Marlins Park, the Rockies defeated Miami 5–3. All eight runs in the game were scored via a solo home run, which set a new Major League record. The previous record for all runs in a game being scored via solo home runs was 5, accomplished 7 times. The most recent was in 2015 when the Seattle Mariners defeated the Los Angeles Angels of Anaheim 3–2.

== Farm system ==
| Level | Team | League | Manager |
|---|---|---|---|
| AAA | Albuquerque Isotopes | Pacific Coast League | Glenallen Hill |
| AA | Hartford Yard Goats | Eastern League | Darin Everson |
| A-Advanced | Modesto Nuts | California League | Fred Ocasio |
| A | Asheville Tourists | South Atlantic League | Warren Schaeffer |
| A-Short Season | Boise Hawks | Northwest League | Andy González |
| Rookie | Grand Junction Rockies | Pioneer League | Frank Gonzales |

Records
| Preceded by 2015 | Colorado Rockies seasons 2016 | Succeeded by 2017 |
