= Valaika =

Valaika is a surname. Notable people with the surname include:

- Chris Valaika (born 1985), American baseball infielder
- Pat Valaika (born 1992), American baseball infielder
