= Ynoa =

Ynoa is a surname. Notable people with the surname include:

- Gabriel Ynoa (born 1993), Dominican baseball player
- Huascar Ynoa (born 1998), Dominican baseball player, brother of Michael
- Michael Ynoa (born 1991), Dominican baseball player
- Rafael Ynoa (born 1987), Dominican baseball player
