= Chad Bettis =

American baseball pitcher (born 1989)

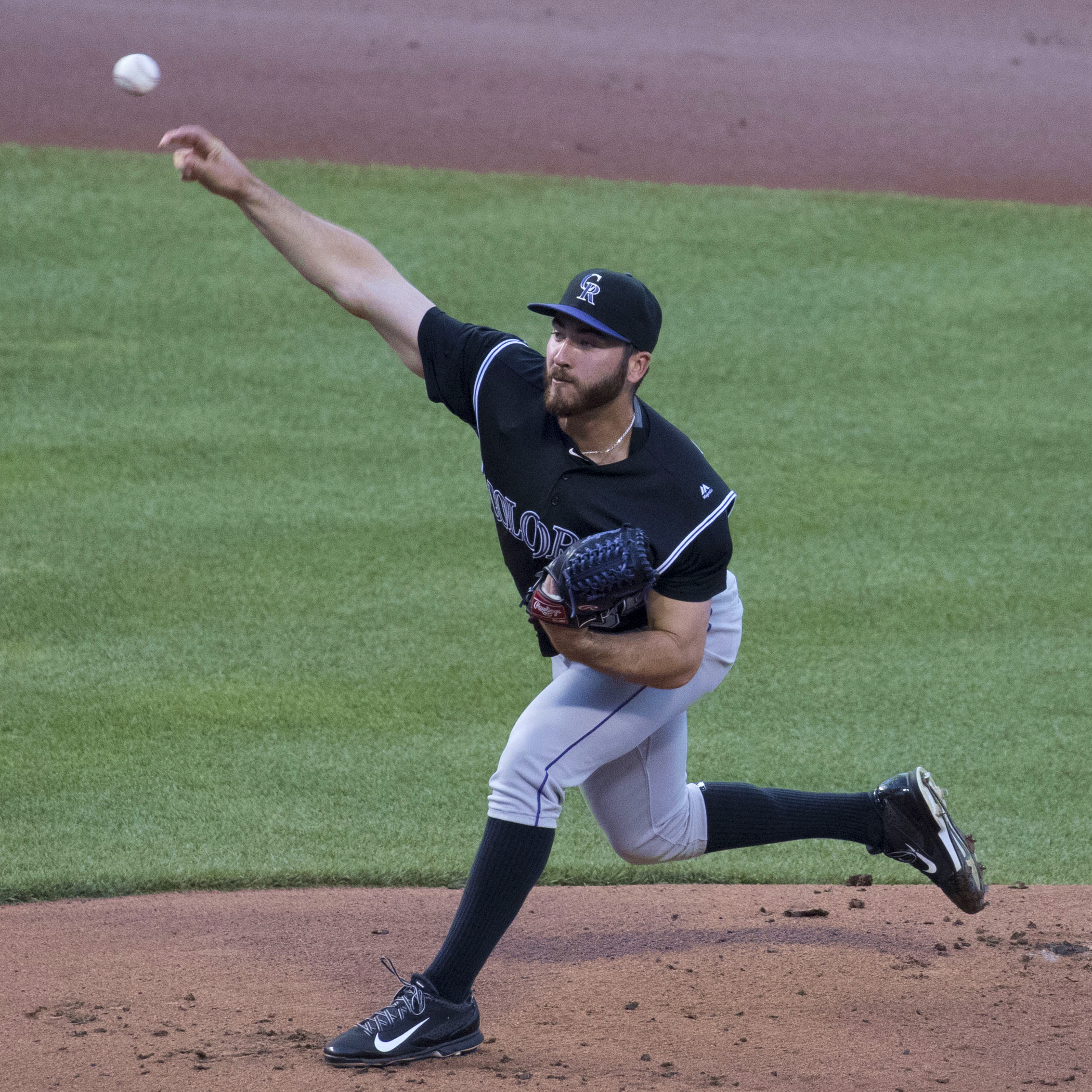
- Bettis pitching for the Colorado Rockies in 2016
- Pitcher
- Born: April 26, 1989 (age 37); Lubbock, Texas, U.S.
- Batted: Right Threw: Right

MLB debut
- August 1, 2013, for the Colorado Rockies

Last MLB appearance
- August 13, 2019, for the Colorado Rockies

MLB statistics
- Win–loss record: 31–31
- Earned run average: 5.12
- Strikeouts: 431
- Stats at Baseball Reference

Teams
- Colorado Rockies (2013–2019)

Chad Robert Bettis (born April 26, 1989) is an American former professional baseball pitcher. He has played in Major League Baseball (MLB) for the Colorado Rockies. He made his MLB debut in 2013. Prior to playing professionally, he attended Texas Tech University, where he played college baseball for the Texas Tech Red Raiders.

== Early life ==
Bettis attended Monterey High School in Lubbock, Texas. Playing for the school's baseball team, Bettis was named to the all-region team before his senior season.

== College career ==
He attended Texas Tech University, where he played college baseball for the Texas Tech Red Raiders baseball team. In 2008, he played collegiate summer baseball with the Falmouth Commodores of the Cape Cod Baseball League.

== Professional career ==
=== Drafts and minor leagues ===
He was drafted by the Houston Astros in the eighth round of the 2007 MLB draft, but did not sign. The Colorado Rockies selected Bettis in the second round, with the 76th overall selection, of the 2010 Major League Baseball draft.

Bettis missed the 2012 season due to a shoulder injury. Prior to the 2013 season, MLB named him the fourth best prospect in the Rockies system.

=== Colorado Rockies (2013–2019) ===
He was promoted to the major leagues to make his debut on August 1, 2013. He allowed five runs in five innings, taking the loss. He struck out just one batter and issued five walks.

The Rockies transitioned Bettis into a relief pitcher in 2014. Bettis struggled with an ERA of 9.12 in 21 games before being demoted to the minors. With the Colorado Springs Sky Sox of the Class AAA Pacific Coast League, Bettis returned to the starting rotation on August 4, 2014. Bettis came to spring training in 2015 prepared to pitch as a starter, and was optioned to the minor leagues.

Bettis spent the entire 2016 season in the Rockies' starting rotation, pitching to a 4.79 ERA in 189 innings pitched. In early December 2016, Bettis was diagnosed with testicular cancer. After undergoing surgery to remove a testicle, he expected to make a full recovery during the offseason. In March 2017, he revealed that the cancer spread, and required chemotherapy.

On August 14, 2017, Bettis made his first appearance in the majors since being diagnosed with cancer, pitching against the Atlanta Braves. He pitched 7 scoreless innings, struck out two, and gave up 6 hits. He was placed on the disabled list on July 3, 2018, with a blister injury.

In 2019, Bettis struggled to begin the season before being moved to the bullpen. He ended the season with a 1–6 record in 39 games. On October 30, 2019, Bettis was outrighted off the Rockies roster and elected free agency.

=== New York Yankees ===
On February 16, 2020, Bettis signed a minor league deal with the New York Yankees that included an invitation to Spring Training.

On June 25, 2020, Bettis announced his retirement from professional baseball.

== Personal life ==
Bettis and his wife, Kristina, had a daughter in April 2017.
