= Rafael Ynoa =

Dominican baseball player (born 1987)

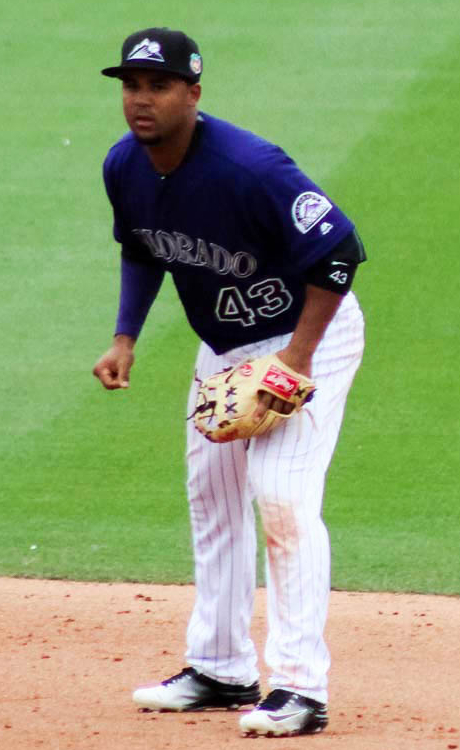
- Ynoa with the Colorado Rockies
- Third baseman / Left fielder
- Born: August 7, 1987 (age 39); Santiago, Santiago, Dominican Republic
- Batted: Switch Threw: Right

MLB debut
- September 1, 2014, for the Colorado Rockies

Last MLB appearance
- August 4, 2016, for the Colorado Rockies

MLB statistics
- Batting average: .281
- Home runs: 0
- Runs batted in: 22
- Stats at Baseball Reference

Teams
- Colorado Rockies (2014–2016)

Rafael Ynoa (born August 7, 1987) is a Dominican former professional baseball third baseman and left fielder. He made his Major League Baseball (MLB) debut with the Colorado Rockies in 2014 and played with them through 2016.

== Career ==
=== Los Angeles Dodgers ===
Ynoa signed with the Los Angeles Dodgers organization as an international free agent in 2006. He made his professional debut for the DSL Dodgers. He spent the 2007 and 2008 seasons with the club, hitting .206/.367/.294 and .306/.408/.363 respectively. In 2009, Ynoa split the season between the AZL Dodgers, Ogden Raptors, and High-A Inland Empire 66ers, batting a cumulative .163/.286/.224 with no home runs and 9 RBI. He spent the next season in Single-A with the Great Lakes Loons, hitting .286/.340/.395 with 9 home runs and 51 RBI in 124 games. In 2011, Ynoa spent the year in High-A ball with the Rancho Cucamonga Quakes, slashing .275/.333/.365 with 5 home runs and 54 RBI. Ynoa continued to move up the Dodgers minor league system in 2012, spending the year with the Double-A Chattanooga Lookouts, batting .278/.364/.352. Ynoa spent the 2013 season in Chattanooga as well, slashing .267/.338/.370 with 6 home runs and 33 RBI across 128 contests. On November 4, 2013, Ynoa elected free agency.

=== Colorado Rockies ===
On November 13, 2013, Ynoa signed a minor league contract with the Colorado Rockies organization. He was assigned to the Triple-A Colorado Springs Sky Sox to begin the season. After hitting .297/.356/.419 in 115 games in Colorado Springs, Ynoa was called up to the majors for the first time on September 1, 2014. He made his MLB debut that day, and collected his first MLB hit, a single off of San Francisco Giants pitcher Tim Hudson, and finished the night with three hits.

Ynoa spent the majority of the 2015 season with Colorado, also appearing in 56 games with the Triple-A Albuquerque Isotopes. In the majors, Ynoa batted .260/.276/.339 with no home runs and 9 RBI across 72 contests. Ynoa was assigned to Triple-A to begin the 2016 season. On September 6, 2016, Ynoa was designated for assignment after Pat Valaika and Jordan Patterson were selected to the roster. He had gone hitless in 5 at-bats across 3 games at the time of his designation, having spent most of his time in Albuquerque. On September 8, he was outrighted to Albuquerque. Ynoa elected free agency following the season on November 7.

On December 14, 2016, Ynoa re-signed with the Rockies organization on a minor league contract. After spending the season in Albuquerque, hitting .234/.311/.313 in 98 games, Ynoa elected free agency following the season on November 6, 2017.

=== Guerreros de Oaxaca ===
On April 21, 2018, Ynoa signed with the Guerreros de Oaxaca of the Mexican Baseball League. He was released on August 16, 2018.
