= Trevor Story =

American baseball player (born 1992)

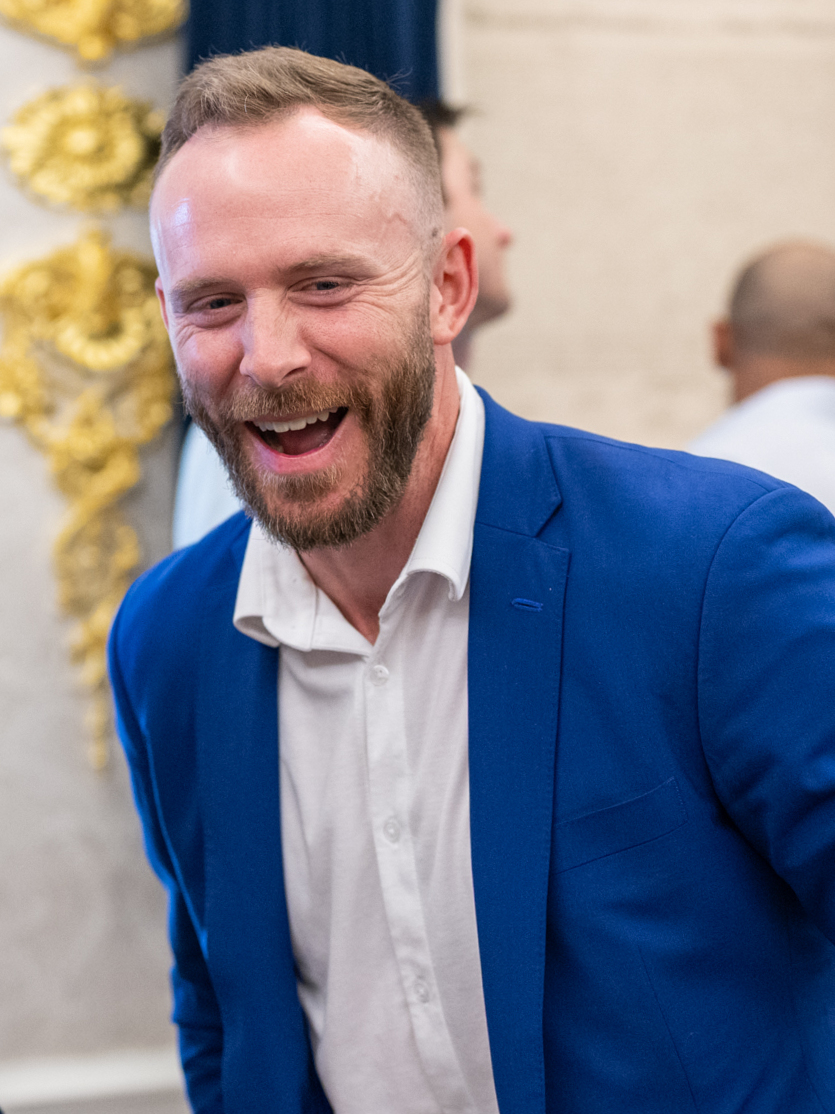
- Story in 2025

Boston Red Sox – No. 10
- Shortstop / Second baseman
- Born: November 15, 1992 (age 34); Irving, Texas, U.S.
- Bats: Right Throws: Right

MLB debut
- April 4, 2016, for the Colorado Rockies

MLB statistics (through 2026 season)
- Batting average: .263
- Home runs: 209
- Runs batted in: 665
- Stolen bases: 165
- Stats at Baseball Reference

Teams
- Colorado Rockies (2016–2021); Boston Red Sox (2022–present)

Career highlights and awards
- 2× All-Star (2018, 2019); 2× Silver Slugger Award (2018, 2019); NL stolen base leader (2020)

Trevor John Story (born November 15, 1992) is an American professional baseball shortstop and second baseman for the Boston Red Sox of Major League Baseball (MLB). He has previously played in MLB for the Colorado Rockies.

Story made his MLB debut in 2016 and set an MLB record for a rookie by hitting home runs in each of his first four games. He tied the MLB rookie record for home runs in the month of April. Story was named the National League's Rookie of the Month for April 2016. He led the NL in strikeouts in 2017, and in power-speed number, extra base hits, and longest home run of the season in 2018. He was an MLB All-Star and won the Silver Slugger Award in 2018 and 2019.

After six seasons with the Rockies, he entered free agency and signed a six-year contract with the Red Sox.

== Early career ==
Story attended Irving High School in Irving, Texas. He played for the Tigers baseball team as a shortstop and pitcher, reaching 96 miles per hour (154 km/h) with his fastball. He also played for the football team as a quarterback, but stopped playing football after his sophomore year of high school so that he could focus on baseball. He committed to attend Louisiana State University (LSU) on a college baseball scholarship.

== Professional career ==
=== Minor leagues ===
The Colorado Rockies of Major League Baseball (MLB) selected Story as a shortstop in the first round, with the 45th overall selection, of the 2011 MLB draft. Story signed with the Rockies, receiving a $915,000 signing bonus, rather than attending LSU. After he signed, he played for the Casper Ghosts of the Rookie-level Pioneer League, where he batted .268. In 2012, Story played for the Asheville Tourists of the Single–A South Atlantic League (SAL), and was named a SAL Postseason All-Star after batting .277 with 18 home runs, 63 runs batted in (RBIs), and 43 doubles, which led all SAL players. Prior to the 2013 season, Story was ranked as the 99th-best prospect in baseball by MLB.com. Story played for the Modesto Nuts of the High–A California League in 2013, and he struggled, recording a .233 batting average with 12 home runs and 65 RBIs. In 2014, after spending a short time with the Low–A Tri-City Dust Devils and excelling in Modesto, with a .322 batting average and 20 stolen bases, the Rockies promoted Story to the Tulsa Drillers of the Double–A Texas League in June. He struggled with Tulsa, batting .205.

With Troy Tulowitzki playing shortstop for the Rockies, Story began to gain experience as a second baseman and third baseman. He began the 2015 season with the New Britain Rock Cats of the Double–A Eastern League, and had a .281 batting average in 300 plate appearances before was promoted to the Albuquerque Isotopes of the Triple–A Pacific Coast League on July 1. During the 2015 season, the Rockies traded Tulowitzki, and Story appeared in the All-Star Futures Game. He finished the 2015 season with a .350 on-base percentage and 20 home runs for New Britain and Albuquerque. The Rockies added Story to their 40-man roster after the 2015 season.

=== Colorado Rockies ===
==== 2016 ====
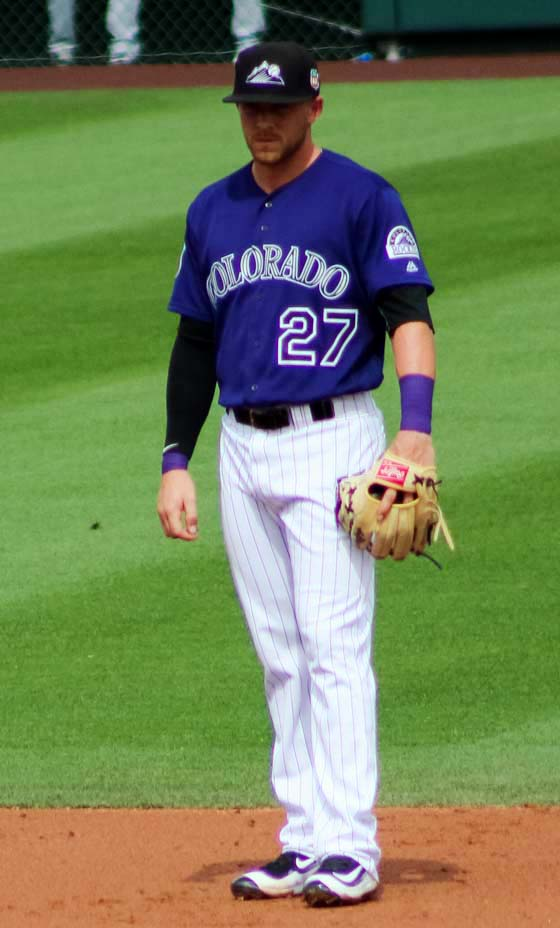
Story during spring training in 2016

With José Reyes suspended for the beginning of the 2016 season, Story competed with Cristhian Adames to become the Rockies' starting shortstop during spring training in 2016. He had a .340 batting average during spring training and made the Rockies' Opening Day roster.

Making his major league debut on Opening Day, April 4, as the Rockies' starting shortstop against the Arizona Diamondbacks, Story recorded his first career hit, a three-run home run off Zack Greinke, in his second major league at bat. He hit another home run in his next plate appearance, becoming the seventh player to hit two home runs in one game against Greinke, the first National League player to hit two home runs in his debut and the first Major League Baseball player to hit two home runs in his debut on Opening Day. The following day, Story hit another home run, becoming only the third player ever to hit three home runs in his first two games, following Charlie Reilly and Joe Cunningham. On his third day in the major leagues, he hit a two-run home run off Arizona's Patrick Corbin, becoming the first player in MLB history to hit a home run in each of his first three games and a home run in each of his first four hits.

In his fourth game, Story hit two home runs against the San Diego Padres, becoming the first rookie to hit home runs in his first four games, and the first player in major league history to hit six home runs in the first four games of any season. He hit another home run in his sixth game, off Brandon Maurer, setting the MLB record for the most home runs (7) in a team's first six games, eclipsing the previous record of six home runs in six games set by Larry Walker, Mike Schmidt and Willie Mays. Story won the National League Player of the Week Award for the first week of the season. With ten home runs in April, Story tied the MLB rookie record, previously set by José Abreu of the Chicago White Sox. After finishing the month leading all MLB rookies with 10 home runs, 19 runs scored, 20 runs batted in and three triples, Story won the National League Rookie of the Month Award for April.

Story was selected as one of the five choices for the All-Star Final Vote. On August 2, Story was placed on the 15-day disabled list due to a torn ulnar collateral ligament of the thumb. He had surgery on the thumb and missed the rest of the season. He finished his rookie season with 101 hits, 67 runs scored, 27 home runs, and 72 RBI.

==== 2017 ====
Story's 2017 season became somewhat less consistent as he finished the year with a .239 batting average, 32 doubles, 24 home runs, and 82 RBI. He also struck out an NL-leading 191 times.

==== 2018 ====
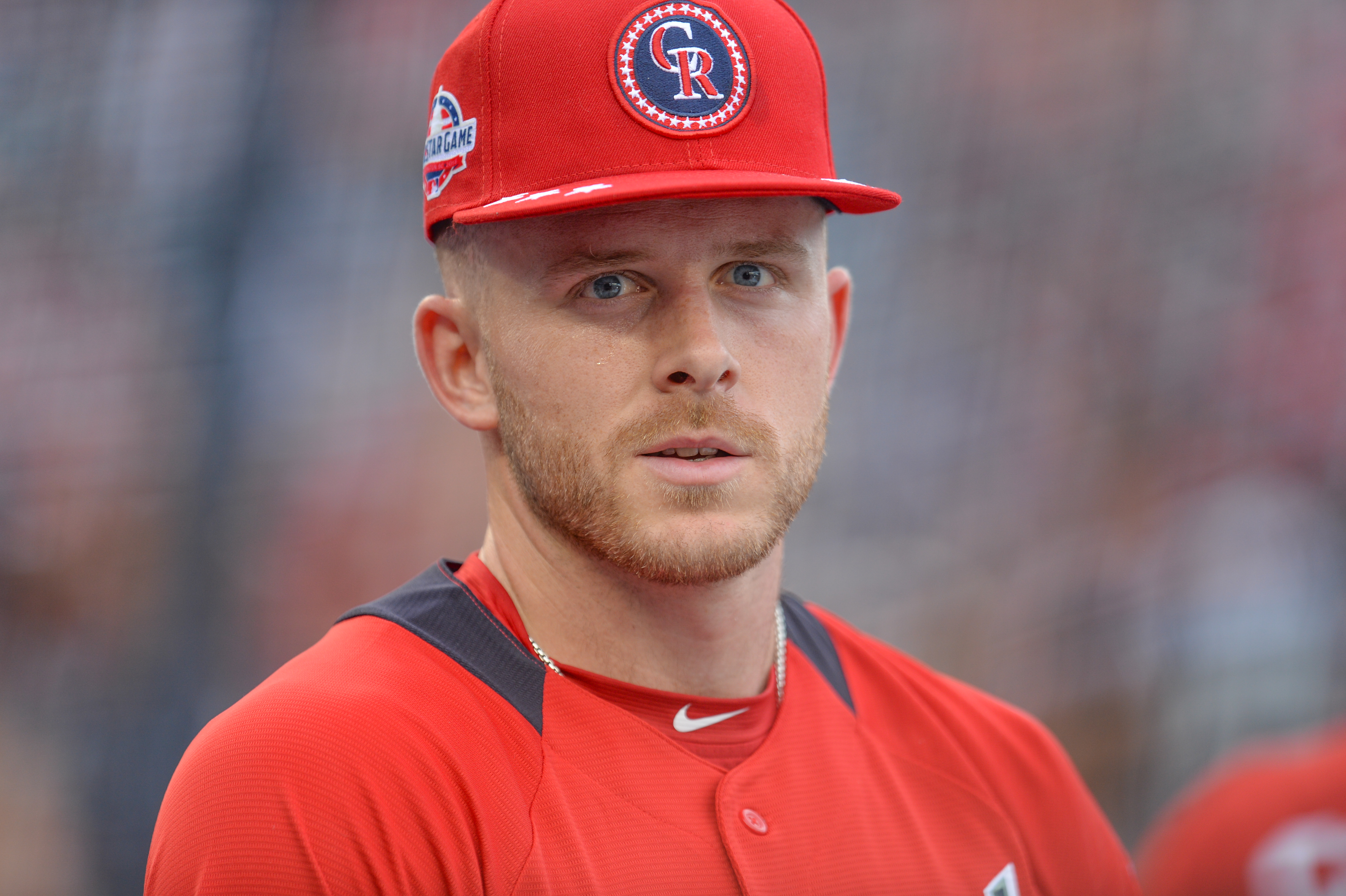
Story at the 2018 MLB All-Star Game

Batting .284 with 17 home runs and 62 RBIs, Story was named to the 2018 MLB All-Star Game. At the end of the 2018 season, Story was first in the NL in power-speed number (31.2) and had a .276 BA, with 42 doubles (4th), 37 home runs (2nd in the NL), 168 strikeouts (4th), 108 RBIs (4th), and 27 stolen bases (6th). On September 5, Story hit three home runs, the second of which was initially measured at 505 feet (154 m), but was later measured at 487 feet (148 m).

==== 2019 ====
On May 24, 2019, Story hit his 100th and 101st home runs, the 101st being a walk off to propel the Rockies to an 8–6 win over the Baltimore Orioles. He became the fastest shortstop to reach this mark, surpassing Alex Rodriguez, doing so in his 448th game. For the 2019 season, Story batted .294 with 35 home runs and 85 RBIs, and was again named to the All-Star team.

==== 2020 ====
In 2020, Story made more defensive errors at shortstop (10) than any other major league shortstop. In 59 games, Story led the team with 11 home runs and finished second on the team with 28 RBIs. Story also led the National League with 15 stolen bases and four triples, and finished 11th in NL MVP voting.

==== 2021 ====
In 142 games played in 2021, Story had a .251/.329/.471 slash line with 24 home runs, including a walk-off homer against the Diamondbacks on May 23.

On November 17, Story declined an $18.4 million qualifying offer from the Rockies, rendering him a free agent within a shortstop market that included Carlos Correa, Corey Seager and Javier Baez. Overall in six seasons with the Rockies, Story appeared in 745 games while batting .272 with 158 home runs and 450 RBIs.

=== Boston Red Sox ===
==== 2022 ====
On March 23, 2022, Story signed a six-year, $140 million contract with the Boston Red Sox. Despite signing later in spring training, Story played in the Red Sox Opening Day against the New York Yankees and became the team's regular second baseman. He hit his first home run with the Red Sox on May 11. In a ten-game stretch over 11 games, Story hit .313 with eight home runs and 22 RBIs. This included a three home run and seven RBI performance in a 12–6 win over the Mariners on May 19. In the four-game series against the Mariners, Story had five home runs and 13 RBIs. After this stretch, Story began to cool off again, not hitting another home run until June 19. On July 16, he was placed on the injured list due to a contusion to his right hand sustained on July 12 when he was hit by a pitch in a game against the Tampa Bay Rays. He remained on the injured list until being activated on August 27. Story returned to the injured list on September 22 due to a left heel contusion, and did not play for the rest of the season. In 94 games with Boston, Story batted .238 with 16 home runs and 66 RBIs.

==== 2023 ====
With Xander Bogaerts gone, Story was expected to return to his natural position of shortstop for the Red Sox in the 2023 season. However, on January 10, 2023, the team announced that Story underwent surgery on his right ulnar collateral ligament, and that he would miss at least part of the 2023 season. He was placed on the 60-day injured list on February 16. After extended time on the injured list, In July, Story began a 13-game rehabilitation stint. The Red Sox activated Story on August 8, and he made his debut the same day in a 9–3 loss to the Kansas City Royals. In his limited time for the Red Sox in 2023, Story appeared in 43 games (36 at shortstop) while batting .203 with three home runs and 14 RBIs.

==== 2024 ====
Story began the 2024 season as Boston's regular shortstop. He was placed on the injured list on April 6, following a shoulder injury in a game against the Los Angeles Angels. Days later, it was announced that Story would undergo surgery to repair a fractured glenoid and was expected to be unavailable for approximately six months, potentially ending his season. In eight games prior to the injury, he batted .226 with four RBI. On September 7, Story was activated from the injured list. He ended the season with a slash line of .340/.394/.734 with two home runs and 10 RBI.

==== 2025 ====
Story began the 2025 season as Boston's regular shortstop. On July 12, Story recorded his 1,000th career hit when he hit a stand-up double to right field in the fifth inning against the Tampa Bay Rays. Story was named the American League Player of the Week for the week of July 28. In five games that week, Story batted .500 with three home runs and eight RBI. On August 23, Story reached 20 home runs for the first time since 2021. On August 26, Story hit his 200th career home run off Baltimore Orioles pitcher Kyle Bradish in the second inning. With that homer, he becomes only the seventh player since 2016 to record 200 home runs and 150 stolen bases, joining Jose Altuve, Mookie Betts, Francisco Lindor, Shohei Ohtani, José Ramírez, and Christian Yelich. He finished the 2025 season with a slash line of .263/.329/.433 with 25 home runs, 96 RBI, and 31 stolen bases in 157 games.

==== 2026 ====
On May 22, 2026, it was announced that Story would require surgery for a sports hernia, and would miss 6 to 10 weeks as a result. Before his injury, Story slashed .206/.244/.303 with 19 RBI, three stolen bases, and three home runs in 41 games played. After missing almost three months, Story began a rehab assignment with the Worcester Red Sox, playing 10 games with the team. He returned to the Red Sox on August 30. The next day, in a 9–8 extra-innings win against the Seattle Mariners, Story would drive in three of the last four runs, including a walk-off single.

== Personal life ==
On November 16, 2018, Story married his high school sweetheart, Mallie Crow, in Grapevine, Texas. Two days after he signed for the Red Sox, Story and Crow welcomed their first child. Story is a Christian.

Story's father, Ken, is a retired fireman and paramedic, and his mother, Teddie, was the chief executive officer of a local food pantry. His older brother, Tyler, played baseball at Irving and for the University of Texas at Austin.

Story grew up as a Texas Rangers fan.
