= Stephen Cardullo =

American baseball player (born 1987)

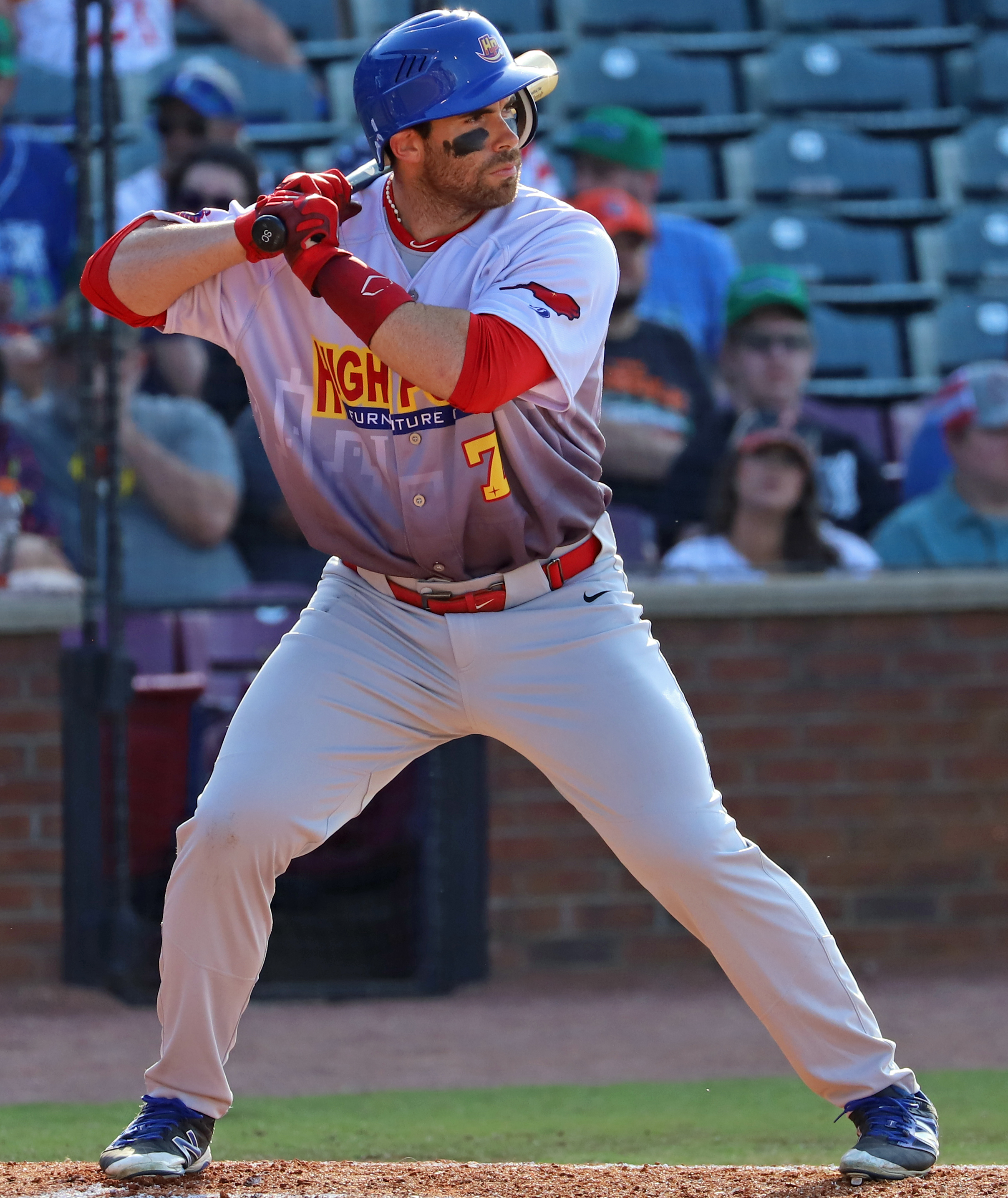
- Cardullo with the High Point Rockers in 2021
- Outfielder / First baseman
- Born: August 31, 1987 (age 39); Hollywood, Florida, U.S.
- Batted: Right Threw: Right

MLB debut
- August 26, 2016, for the Colorado Rockies

Last MLB appearance
- April 22, 2017, for the Colorado Rockies

Career statistics
- Batting average: .190
- Home runs: 2
- Runs batted in: 9
- Stats at Baseball Reference

Teams
- Colorado Rockies (2016–2017)

Stephen Andrew Cardullo (born August 31, 1987) is an American former professional baseball outfielder and first baseman. After playing college baseball for the Florida State Seminoles, Cardullo played for the Colorado Rockies of Major League Baseball (MLB) in 2016 and 2017.

== Career ==
Cardullo attended St. Thomas Aquinas High School in Fort Lauderdale, Florida. He was not recruited to play college baseball, but after a tryout became a walk-on for the Florida State Seminoles baseball team at Florida State University. After receiving little playing time as a freshman and a sophomore, he began his junior year as the Seminoles' starting first baseman before shifting to shortstop. He batted.376 with 10 home runs and 51 runs batted in, and was named a First-Team All-American. In 2009, he played collegiate summer baseball with the Harwich Mariners of the Cape Cod Baseball League.

=== Arizona Diamondbacks ===
The Arizona Diamondbacks selected Cardullo in the 24th round of the 2010 Major League Baseball draft. Cardullo spent the 2010 and 2011 seasons in rookie ball with the Missoula Osprey, batting a cumulative.264/.348/.451 with 10 home runs and 43 RBI in 81 total games. On March 20, 2012, Cardullo was released by the Diamondbacks organization.

=== Florence Freedom ===
Cardullo signed with the London Rippers of the Frontier League for the 2012 season. However, the team folded, and Cardullo was traded to the Florence Freedom of the Frontier League. On the year, Cardullo slashed.263/.351/.375 between the two clubs with 3 home runs and 35 RBI in 87 games.

=== Rockland Boulders ===
Cardullo signed with the Rockland Boulders of the Can-Am League for the 2013 season. In 2013, Cardullo batted.267/.349/.417 with 6 home runs and 56 RBI in 100 contests. The next year, Cardullo played in 92 games for Rockland with a batting line of.298/.339/.423 to go along with 6 home runs and 51 RBI and was part of the team’s first championship. In 2015, Cardullo had a batting line of.331/.410/.518, all career-highs to go along with career-highs in RBI (76) and stolen bases (23). Cardullo was named the CanAm League MVP for the 2015 season.

=== Colorado Rockies ===
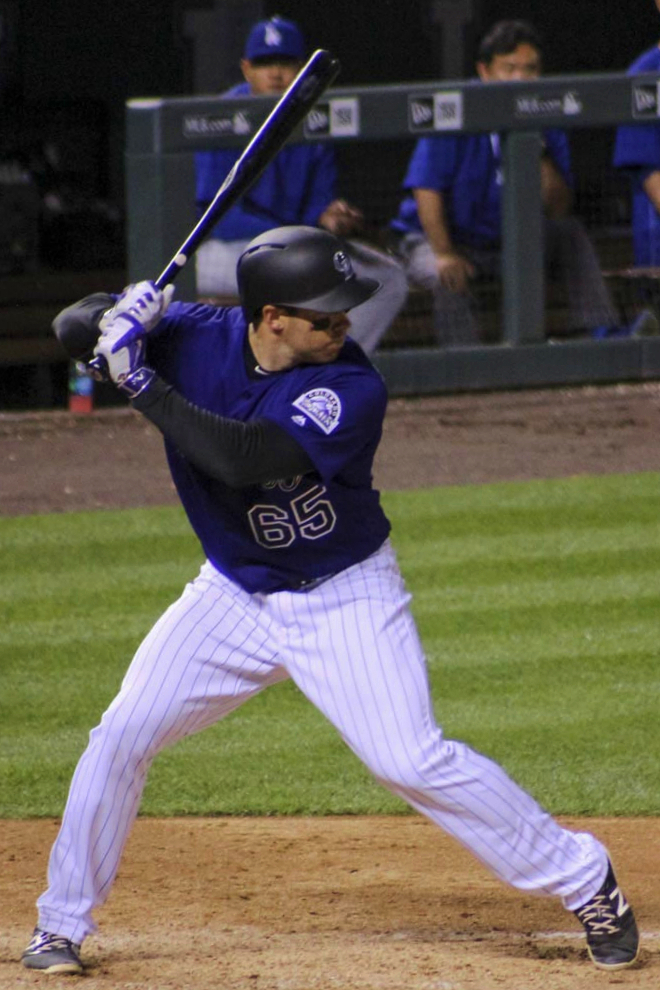
Cardullo with the Rockies in 2016

On January 6, 2016, Cardullo signed a minor league contract with the Colorado Rockies organization. The Rockies assigned Cardullo to the Albuquerque Isotopes of the Triple–A Pacific Coast League. Cardullo was called up to the major leagues for the first time on August 26. He hit his first Major League home run against Casey Fien in the first game of a doubleheader against the Los Angeles Dodgers on August 31, his 29th birthday, and his first grand slam in the second game against Bud Norris. On December 2, Cardullo was non-tendered by the Rockies after hitting.214/.254/.411 with two home runs and six RBI in 27 games.

On December 15, 2016, Cardullo re-signed with the Rockies organization on a minor league contract that included an invitation to spring training. Cardullo made the Rockies' Opening Day roster out of spring and had his contract selected to the 40-man roster on March 31, 2017. After collecting 4 hits in 32 plate appearances for the Rockies, Cardullo suffered a broken wrist while playing for the Triple-A Albuquerque Isotopes. The Rockies released Cardullo on May 19, 2017, but quickly re-signed him to a minor league contract on May 23. He elected free agency following the season on November 6.

Cardullo re-signed with the Rockies on a minor league contract on January 5, 2018. In 73 games for Triple–A Albuquerque, he batted.286/.336/.437 with three home runs and 30 RBI. Cardullo elected free agency following the season on November 2.

=== High Point Rockers ===
On April 11, 2019, Cardullo signed with the High Point Rockers of the Atlantic League of Professional Baseball. Cardullo was named an Atlantic League All-Star for the 2019 season. He finished the year batting.266/.375/.477 with 22 home runs and 70 RBI. He became a free agent following the season.

On January 30, 2020, Cardullo signed with the Tecolotes de los Dos Laredos of the Mexican League. Cardullo did not play a Mexican League game in 2020 due to the cancellation of the Mexican League season caused by the COVID-19 pandemic. He later became a free agent.

On June 15, 2021, Cardullo re-signed with the High Point Rockers of the Atlantic League of Professional Baseball. In 91 games for High Point, he slashed.289/.412/.535 with 20 home runs, 76 RBI, and 16 stolen bases. Cardullo became a free agent following the season.

=== New York Boulders ===
On July 25, 2024, Cardullo signed a one–day contract with the New York Boulders of the Frontier League. In his only appearance for the team, he went 2–for–5 with two singles.
