= Chris Rusin =

American baseball player (born 1986)

- Pitcher
- Born: October 22, 1986 (age 39); Detroit, Michigan, U.S.
- Batted: Left Threw: Left

MLB debut
- August 21, 2012, for the Chicago Cubs

Last MLB appearance
- August 3, 2020, for the Atlanta Braves

MLB statistics
- Win–loss record: 20–28
- Earned run average: 4.65
- Strikeouts: 341
- Stats at Baseball Reference

Teams
- Chicago Cubs (2012–2014); Colorado Rockies (2015–2019); Atlanta Braves (2020)

Christopher Patrick Rusin (born October 22, 1986) is an American former professional baseball pitcher. Prior to beginning his professional career, he played college baseball at the University of Kentucky. He played in Major League Baseball (MLB) for the Chicago Cubs, Colorado Rockies, and Atlanta Braves.

== College career ==
Rusin, a graduate of Divine Child High School, enrolled at the University of Kentucky, where he played college baseball for the Kentucky Wildcats in the Southeastern Conference (SEC). As a junior in 2008, Rusin was named to the All-SEC first team after posting a 6–3 win–loss record and a 3.33 earned run average. The Oakland Athletics drafted Rusin in the 23rd round of the 2008 MLB draft, but he opted to return to Kentucky for his senior season.

== Professional career ==
=== Chicago Cubs ===
The Chicago Cubs selected Rusin in the fourth round, with the 140th selection of the 2009 MLB draft, and Rusin signed. Rusin started the 2010 season with the Daytona Cubs of the High-A Florida State League, and was promoted to the Tennessee Smokies of the Double-A Southern League in August.

After pitching for the Iowa Cubs of the Triple-A Pacific Coast League in 2012, he made his major league debut for the Cubs on August 21. He pitched in seven games in 2012, winning two and losing three. Rusin returned to the Iowa Cubs where he spent the 2013 season until July 2, when he was called up and started a game against the Oakland Athletics. He made 13 appearances in 2013, pitching to a 3.93 ERA on the year.

Rusin was among the last players cut from the major league team in spring training in 2014. Pitching for Iowa, Rusin threw a no-hitter on May 7. He allowed 10 runs in 12 2/3 major leagues innings for the Cubs in 2014.

=== Colorado Rockies ===
On September 27, 2014, Rusin was acquired by the Colorado Rockies, after being placed on waivers by the Cubs. In 2015, Rusin recorded a 6-10 record and 5.33 ERA in 24 games for the Rockies. In 2016, he pitched to a 3.74 ERA with 69 strikeouts in 84 1/3 innings of work. On August 7, 2016, he gave up Ichiro Suzuki's 3,000th hit.

Rusin made 60 appearances for Colorado in 2017, registering a 5-1 record and 2.65 ERA in 85 innings. In 2018, Rusin appeared in 49 games for the Rockies, struggling to a 6.09 ERA with 47 strikeouts in 54 2/3 innings. Rusin spent the majority of the 2019 season in Triple-A with the Albuquerque Isotopes, also allowing 4 earned runs in 1 major league inning. On June 7, 2019, Rusin was designated for assignment by the Rockies. On June 12, he was outrighted to Triple-A. On October 3, Rusin elected free agency.

=== Atlanta Braves ===
On January 18, 2020, Rusin signed a minor league deal with the Atlanta Braves. Rusin started 2020 in major league spring training. However, the completion of spring training and start of the regular season was delayed by the COVID-19 pandemic. On June 29, Rusin was included among the Braves‘ pool of 60 players eligible to play in 2020. On August 1, Rusin’s contract was selected to the 40-man roster. Three days later, Rusin was designated for assignment, then outrighted on August 6. The Braves released Rusin on September 5.

=== Colorado Rockies (second stint) ===
On April 12, 2021, Rusin signed a minor league contract with the Colorado Rockies. Rusin made 30 appearances in 2021 for Triple-A Albuquerque, struggling to a 10.41 ERA with only 23 strikeouts. On August 26, Rusin was released by the Rockies organization.
