= Cristhian Adames =

Dominican baseball infielder (born 1991)

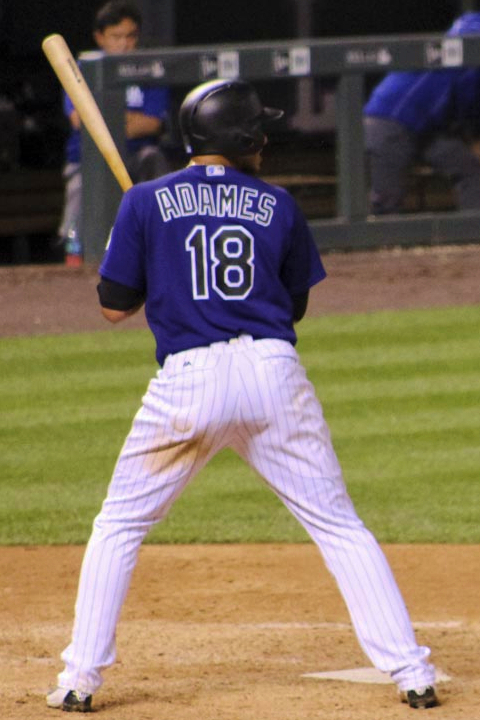
- Adames batting for the Colorado Rockies in 2016

Pericos de Puebla – No. 13
- Infielder
- Born: July 26, 1991 (age 34); Santo Domingo, Dominican Republic
- Bats: Switch Throws: Right

MLB debut
- July 29, 2014, for the Colorado Rockies

MLB statistics (through 2019 season)
- Batting average: .213
- Home runs: 2
- Runs batted in: 22
- Stats at Baseball Reference

Teams
- Colorado Rockies (2014–2017); San Francisco Giants (2019)

Cristhian Pascual Adames Mejia (born July 26, 1991) is a Dominican professional baseball infielder for the Pericos de Puebla of the Mexican League. The Colorado Rockies signed Adames as a non-drafted free agent in 2007. He has played in Major League Baseball (MLB) for the Rockies, with whom he made his MLB debut in 2014, and San Francisco Giants.

== Career ==
=== Colorado Rockies ===
The Colorado Rockies signed Adames as a non-drafted free agent in 2007. He made his MLB debut with the Rockies on July 29, 2014.

The Rockies designated Adames for assignment on April 30, 2017, after Ian Desmond was activated from the injured list. He cleared waivers and was sent outright to the Triple–A Albuquerque Isotopes on May 6. In 89 games for the Albuquerque, Adames hit .263/.317/.461 with 11 home runs and 52 RBI. He elected free agency following the season on November 6.

=== Miami Marlins ===
On December 14, 2017, Adames signed a minor league contract with the Miami Marlins organization. He spent the 2018 season with the Triple–A New Orleans Baby Cakes, playing in 122 games and hitting .270/.324/.370 with 7 home runs and 57 RBI. He elected free agency following the season on November 2, 2018.

=== Chicago Cubs ===
On January 21, 2019, Adames signed a minor league contract with the Chicago Cubs organization. Adames spent the majority of the year dealing with an undisclosed injury, and hit .256 with 2 home runs and 6 RBI in 12 games for the Triple–A Iowa Cubs. He was released by Chicago on July 5.

=== San Francisco Giants ===
On July 12, 2019, Adames signed a minor league contract with the San Francisco Giants. On September 14, the Giants selected his contract. He batted .318/.375/.364 for the Giants in 22 at–bats. Playing for the Triple–A Sacramento River Cats, he hit .283/.364/.517 in 145 at–bats. Adames was removed from the 40–man roster and sent outright to Sacramento on November 1. Adames did not play in a game in 2020 due to the cancellation of the minor league season because of the COVID-19 pandemic. He became a free agent on November 2, 2020.

=== Leones de Yucatán ===
On March 21, 2022, Adames signed with the Saraperos de Saltillo of the Mexican League for the 2022 season. However, he did not make the Opening Day roster and his rights were later acquired by the Leones de Yucatán. He signed with the Leones on April 23. In 78 games for the team, Adames batted .255/.379/.517 with 17 home runs and 51 RBI. He won the Mexican League Championship with the team in 2022.

Adames returned to the team in 2023. He appeared in 35 games, slashing .220/.314/.325 with two home runs and 11 RBI, before he was waived on June 1, 2023.

=== Pericos de Puebla ===
On June 2, 2023, Adames was claimed off waivers by the Pericos de Puebla of the Mexican League. In 52 games, he batted .300/.385/.506 with 8 home runs, 35 RBI, and 6 stolen bases. With Puebla, Adames won the Serie del Rey.

Adames made 88 appearances for Puebla in 2024, slashing .301/.406/.442 with seven home runs, 39 RBI, and 13 stolen bases.

In 2025, Adames returned for a third season with Puebla. In 77 games he hit .354/.457/.566 with 11 home runs, 63 RBIs and 3 stolen bases.
