= Tony Wolters =

American baseball player (born 1992)

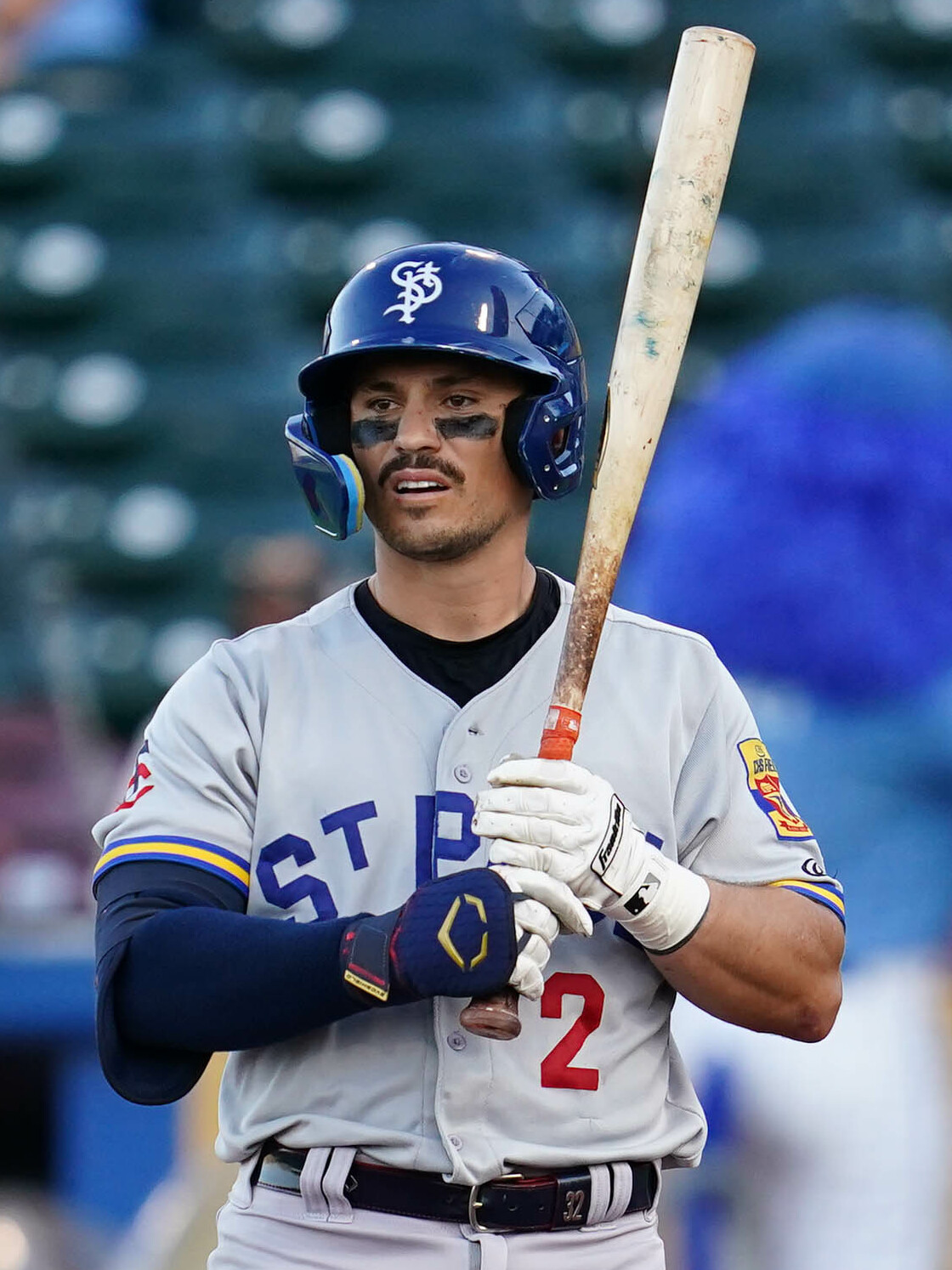
- Wolters with the St. Paul Saints in 2023
- Catcher
- Born: June 9, 1992 (age 34); Vista, California, U.S.
- Batted: Left Threw: Right

MLB debut
- April 5, 2016, for the Colorado Rockies

Last MLB appearance
- August 14, 2022, for the Los Angeles Dodgers

MLB statistics
- Batting average: .235
- Home runs: 7
- Runs batted in: 123
- Stats at Baseball Reference

Teams
- Colorado Rockies (2016–2020); Chicago Cubs (2021); Los Angeles Dodgers (2022)

Anthony John Wolters (born June 9, 1992) is an American former professional baseball catcher. He played in Major League Baseball (MLB) for the Colorado Rockies, Chicago Cubs, and Los Angeles Dodgers.

== Playing career ==
=== Cleveland Indians ===
Wolters was drafted by the Cleveland Indians in the third round of the 2010 Major League Baseball draft out of Rancho Buena Vista High School in Vista, California. He signed with Cleveland for $1.35 million, forgoing his commitment to play college baseball at the University of San Diego.

Prior to the 2013 season he was moved from an infielder to catcher. After the 2014 season, Cleveland added Wolters to their 40-man roster. He hit. 209 in Double-A in 2015, missing the final two months off the season after having surgery to repair torn cartilage in his knee. Cleveland designated him for assignment before the 2016 season.

=== Colorado Rockies ===
The Colorado Rockies claimed Wolters off waivers in February 2016. Though he had not yet played in Triple-A, he was named the team's opening day backup catcher, beating Dustin Garneau for the role. He made his major league debut on April 5, as a defensive replacement for Nick Hundley. In his first major league at bat, Wolters grounded out off of Jake Barrett. During his first major league start on April 10, Wolters got his first MLB hit, singling against James Shields. In the same game, Wolters walked and scored a run for the first time in the big leagues. He hit his first career home run on June 25, against Shelby Miller of the Arizona Diamondbacks in the bottom of the 6th inning, scoring Brandon Barnes. As a rookie, he hit .259 with 3 home runs, 30 RBIs, and 4 stolen bases. He was nicknamed "Papers" by other players because his locker was full of paper scouting reports.

On April 3, 2017, Wolters was the starting catcher on Opening Day against the Milwaukee Brewers. He went 2-for-4, scoring the two final runs to take the lead, one in the seventh off an error, and one in the ninth of a double from Alexi Amarista. He struggled offensively throughout the season, ultimately being the backup catcher to Jonathan Lucroy after July. He ended the season hitting .240 in 83 games with no home runs and 16 RBIs.

In 2018, Wolters played in 74 games for the Rockies. In the 2018 National League (NL) Wild Card Game, he hit a go-ahead single in the 13th inning of a game the Rockies would win, 2–1 and advance to NL Division Series to face the Brewers. Wolters set career highs offensively in batting average (.262), games played (121) and RBIs (42) in 2019. He slashed .230/.280/.270 in 42 games in 2020. On December 2, Wolters was non-tendered by the Rockies.

=== Chicago Cubs ===
On February 11, 2021, Wolters signed a minor league contract with the Pittsburgh Pirates organization that included an invitation to spring training. On March 30, Wolters opted out of his minor league contract and became a free agent.

On March 31, Wolters signed a one-year, major league contract with the Chicago Cubs. On April 14, he was designated for assignment after Austin Romine was activated off the injured list (IL). In 3 games for Chicago, Wolters had only 5 plate appearances, going hitless with a walk. He was outrighted to the alternate training site on April 17. On April 26, Wolters was again selected to the active roster when Romine returned to the IL with a left wrist sprain. After posting a .125/.276/.125 slash line in 30 plate appearances, Wolters was again designated for assignment on May 19. He was outrighted to the Triple-A Iowa Cubs on May 22. He was released on August 3.

=== Los Angeles Dodgers ===
On August 7, 2021, Wolters signed a minor league contract with the Los Angeles Dodgers. He appeared in 26 games for the Triple-A Oklahoma City Dodgers and had a .215 batting average. He remained with Oklahoma City to begin 2022 and was called up to the majors on August 12. He appeared in two games for the Dodgers, striking out in three of his four at-bats. Wolters was designated for assignment on August 15 and released a few days later. He was quickly re-signed to a new minor league contract. He played in 61 games in 2022 and slashed .230/.321/.284 with no home runs and 29 RBI. Wolters elected free agency following the season on November 10.

=== Minnesota Twins ===
On January 5, 2023, Wolters signed a minor league contract with the Minnesota Twins. In 57 games for the Triple-A St. Paul Saints, he batted .244/.386/.343 with 3 home runs and 21 RBI. He elected free agency following the season on November 6.

== Coaching career ==
On January 21, 2024, Wolters announced his retirement from playing in an Instagram post, while also announcing that he had accepted a coaching position with the Rockies as the bench coach for the rookie league ACL Rockies. He reprised the role for the 2025 season.

== Personal ==
Wolters is married. His daughter was born in early 2021. They reside in Arizona.

Wolters grew up a San Diego Padres fan. Tony Gwynn was his favorite player.
