= Jeff Huson =

American baseball player (born 1964)

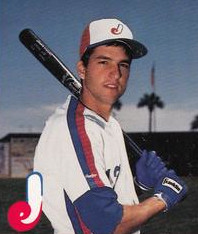
- Huson c. 1988 with the Jacksonville Expos
- Infielder
- Born: August 15, 1964 (age 61); Scottsdale, Arizona, U.S.
- Batted: Left Threw: Right

MLB debut
- September 2, 1988, for the Montreal Expos

Last MLB appearance
- October 1, 2000, for the Chicago Cubs

MLB statistics
- Batting average: .234
- Home runs: 8
- Runs batted in: 150
- Stats at Baseball Reference

Teams
- Montreal Expos (1988–1989); Texas Rangers (1990–1993); Baltimore Orioles (1995–1996); Milwaukee Brewers (1997); Seattle Mariners (1998); Anaheim Angels (1999); Chicago Cubs (2000)

Jeffrey Kent Huson (born August 15, 1964) is an American baseball broadcaster for the Colorado Rockies and former professional baseball utility infielder. He played in Major League Baseball (MLB) for the Montreal Expos, Texas Rangers, Baltimore Orioles, Milwaukee Brewers, Seattle Mariners, Anaheim Angels, and Chicago Cubs.

== Playing career ==
Huson attended Mingus Union High School in Cottonwood, Arizona. He played college baseball at Glendale Community College, where he was an Arizona junior college all-star, then transferred to play for the Wyoming Cowboys, where he was an All-Western Athletic Conference player in 1984 and 1985.

Signed by the Expos as an amateur free agent in 1985, Huson made his MLB debut with Montreal as a September call-up on September 2, 1988. He was a minor league all-star in 1988 and 1989. He recorded the first two outs of a triple play at shortstop for Montreal on September 27, 1989. After playing in 52 games in two seasons in the majors with Montreal, he was traded to the Rangers for Drew Hall on April 2, 1990. He played in at least 119 games in his first three seasons in Texas, the three most of his career. He was third among American League shortstops with 17 errors in 1990. He tire his rotator cuff diving for a ball in September 1992, undergoing surgery the following January.

After not playing in the majors in 1994, Huson elected free agency and signed with the Orioles. He played third base next to Cal Ripken Jr. during Rikpen's record-breaking 2,131st consecutive game played in September 1995.

Baltimore released Huson in August 1996, and he signed days later with the Rockies. Colorado traded Huson, who did not play in the majors with the team, to the Brewers for a player to be named later in April 1997. He re-signed with the Rockies after the season but was selected by the Mariners in the Rule 5 draft. The Mariners released him in July. He was on the Angels roster for all of 1999 and with the Cubs for all of 2000.

== Post-playing career ==
Huson worked as a roving infield instructor for the Cubs from 2001 to 2005.

Huson is a television color commentator for the Colorado Rockies, beginning his work with the team in 2006.

== Personal life ==
Huson and his wife reside in Parker, Colorado. They have three children and seven grandchildren.
