= Pat Valaika =

American baseball player (born 1992)

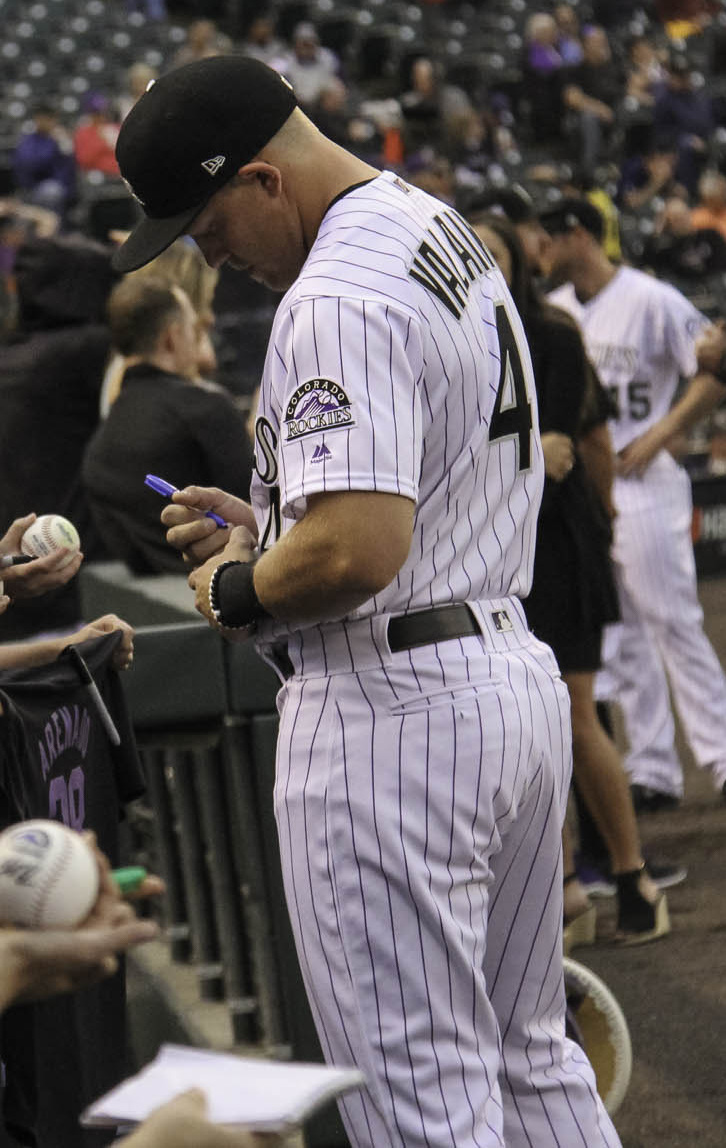
- Valaika at Coors Field in 2018
- Infielder
- Born: September 9, 1992 (age 33); Valencia, California, U.S.
- Batted: Right Threw: Right

MLB debut
- September 6, 2016, for the Colorado Rockies

Last MLB appearance
- October 3, 2021, for the Baltimore Orioles

MLB statistics
- Batting average: .221
- Home runs: 30
- Runs batted in: 92
- Stats at Baseball Reference

Teams
- Colorado Rockies (2016–2019); Baltimore Orioles (2020–2021)

Patrick Ryne Valaika (born September 9, 1992) is an American former professional baseball infielder. He played in Major League Baseball (MLB) for the Colorado Rockies and Baltimore Orioles.

== Playing career ==
=== Amateur career ===
Valaika attended William S. Hart High School in Santa Clarita, California, and the University of California, Los Angeles (UCLA), where he played college baseball for the UCLA Bruins. In 2012, he played collegiate summer baseball with the Chatham Anglers of the Cape Cod Baseball League.

=== Colorado Rockies ===
==== Minor leagues ====
Valaika was drafted by the Colorado Rockies in the ninth round, with the 259th overall selection, of the 2013 Major League Baseball draft.

Valaika made his professional debut on July 8, 2013, playing shortstop for the Tri-City Dust Devils of the Northwest League going 1 for 4 with an RBI triple. Valaika started the 2014 season with the Asheville Tourists of the South Atlantic League batting .370 over 34 games before being promoted to the Modesto Nuts of the California League. He spent two seasons in the Eastern League, 2015 with the New Britain Rock Cats and 2016 with the Hartford Yard Goats before being promoted to the Albuquerque Isotopes of the Pacific Coast League for the last month of the Minor League Baseball season. During the 2016 season he earned Eastern League Mid-Season All-Star honors and was named a Colorado Rockies Organization All-Star, resulting in a September call-up for the Rockies. Valaika would see time with Isotopes during the 2017, 2018, and 2019 seasons while also getting time in the Major Leagues. During the 2019 season with Albuquerque he was named to the Mid-Season Pacific Coast League All-Star Game.

==== Major leagues ====
The Rockies promoted Valaika to the major leagues for the first time on September 6, 2016, and made his Major League Baseball debut the same day pinch running for pinch hitter Tom Murphy in the bottom of the 8th inning during a game against the San Francisco Giants. He made his first defensive appearance on September 8, 2016, replacing third baseman Nolan Arenado in the bottom of the sixth inning, a game where he also got his first plate appearance hitting a double in the bottom of the 8th inning. His first start in the major leagues came against the Los Angeles Dodgers on September 24, 2016.

On Mother's Day, 2017, Valaika hit two home runs, and on Father's Day that same year, he hit a pinch hit home run.

=== Baltimore Orioles ===
On October 30, 2019, Valaika was claimed off waivers by the Baltimore Orioles. However, Valaika was designated for assignment by the Orioles on January 10, 2020, to make room for Richard Ureña on their 40-man roster.

On January 16, 2020, Valaika was claimed off waivers by the Arizona Diamondbacks. Valaika was designated for assignment by the Diamondbacks on January 27, following the acquisition of Starling Marte.

On January 30, Valaika was again claimed off waivers by the Baltimore Orioles. He was outrighted to the Norfolk Tides on February 11. On July 23 the Orioles selected his contract to the major league roster. In 2020 for the Orioles, Valaika slashed .277/.315/.475 with 8 home runs and 16 RBI.

On August 5, 2021, after having 193 at-bats and hitting .192 with 4 home runs and 21 RBI, Valaika was designated for assignment by the Orioles. On August 8, Valaika was sent outright to the Triple-A Norfolk Tides. There, he played in 22 games, hitting .225 with 2 home runs and 7 RBI. On September 14, the Orioles re-selected Valaika's contract. Valaika was outrighted off of the 40-man roster on October 23 and granted free agency on October 25.

=== Atlanta Braves ===
On March 19, 2022, Valaika signed a minor league contract with the Atlanta Braves. Valaika played in 114 games for the Triple-A Gwinnett Stripers, hitting .242 with 10 home runs, 54 RBI, and two stolen bases. He elected free agency following the season on November 10.

=== Seattle Mariners ===
On March 23, 2023, Valaika signed a minor league contract with the Seattle Mariners organization. In 38 games for the Triple–A Tacoma Rainiers, Valaika batted .240 with four home runs and 26 RBI.

=== Los Angeles Dodgers ===
On July 4, 2023, Valaika was traded to the Los Angeles Dodgers. In 25 games for the Triple-A Oklahoma City Dodgers, he hit .225/.276/.303 with two home runs and 10 RBI. Valaika elected free agency following the season on November 6.

== Coaching career ==
On October 10, 2023, Valaika was hired to serve as an undergraduate assistant coach at the University of California, Los Angeles.

== Personal life ==
Pat is one of four brothers to play professional baseball. Chris, played professionally from 2006 to 2015, including time in Major League Baseball with the Cincinnati Reds, Miami Marlins, and Chicago Cubs. Nick, was drafted by the Pittsburgh Pirates in 2017 and spent two years in their farm system with the Bristol Pirates and West Virginia Black Bears. Matt, was drafted by the St. Louis Cardinals and played one season with the Batavia Muckdogs before retiring due to injury.
