= List of Major League Baseball tie-breakers =

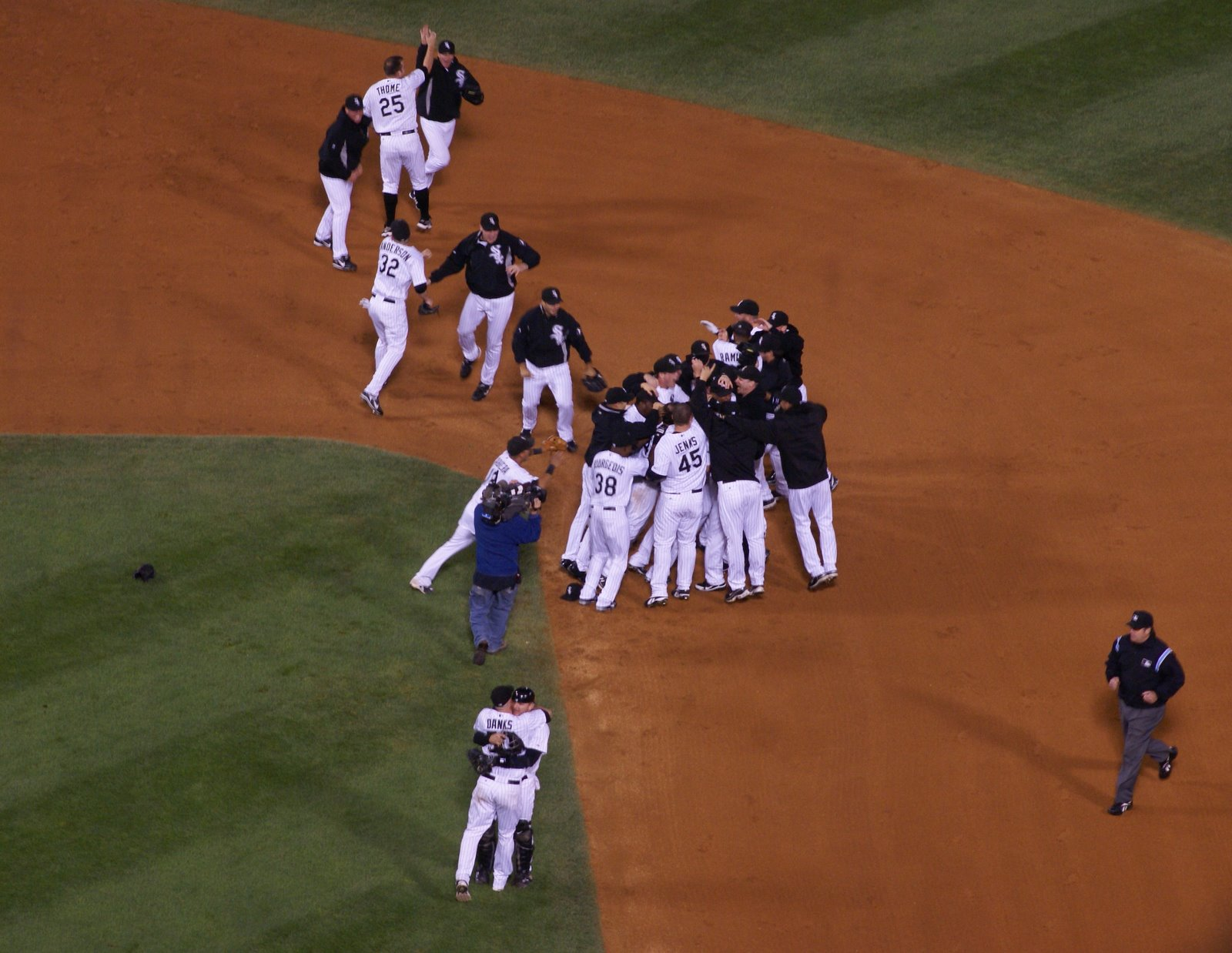
The Chicago White Sox celebrate after defeating the Minnesota Twins 1–0 to win the 2008 American League Central.

A tie-breaker was required in Major League Baseball (MLB) when two or more teams were tied at the end of the regular season for a postseason position such as a league pennant (prior to the introduction of the League Championship Series in 1969), a division title, or a wild card spot. Until 2022, both the American League (AL) and the National League (NL) used a one-game playoff format for tie-breakers, although the NL used a best-of-three series prior to 1969, when the leagues were split into divisions. As these tie-breaker games counted as part of the regular season and MLB teams (American League beginning in 1961, and National League beginning in 1962) have 162-game regular season schedules, the tie-breaker games were sometimes referred to as "Game 163". In 2022, as part of the new Collective Bargaining Agreement to end the 2021–22 Major League Baseball lockout, tiebreaker games were replaced with statistical tiebreaker procedures.

Sixteen tie-breakers – 12 single-game and four series – have been played in MLB history. In baseball statistics, tie-breaker games counted as regular season games with all events in them counted towards regular season statistics. This had implications on statistical races, such as when Matt Holliday won the batting average and runs batted in titles thanks in part to his performance in the 2007 tie-breaker. Home-field advantage for tie-breakers was determined by a coin flip through the 2008 season, after which performance-based criteria, starting with head-to-head record of the tied teams, were put in place.

Although there have been no situations requiring a tie-breaker between more than two teams, it was possible. In 2007, for example, the Philadelphia Phillies, New York Mets, San Diego Padres, Colorado Rockies, and Arizona Diamondbacks finished the season within two games of one another. The possibility existed for as many as four teams to be locked in a series of tie-breakers that year to decide the NL East, West, and Wild Card. Similarly, late in the 2012 season the possibility existed for the New York Yankees, Baltimore Orioles, and either the Texas Rangers or Oakland Athletics to all finish with the same record. This could have required the teams to play a complex set of multiple games to determine divisional and wild card winners, a situation which Jayson Stark described as potentially "baseball's worst scheduling nightmare."

== History ==
The first tie-breaker, held in 1946, decided the winner of the NL pennant between the St. Louis Cardinals and the Brooklyn Dodgers, who had finished the season tied at 96–58. The Cardinals won the series in two games and went on to win the 1946 World Series, one of four tie-breaker winners who have gone on to win the World Series. Three tie-breaker games have gone into extra innings: the decisive second game of the 1959 series, the 2007 Wild Card tie-breaker, and the 2009 game. The 2008 tie-breaker, a 1–0 victory for the White Sox, was the lowest scoring game, while the 2007 match-up with 17 total runs was the highest scoring. The Dodgers franchise has participated in six tie-breakers, twice while the team was based in Brooklyn and four times in Los Angeles, the most for any team. Dodger Stadium, Ebbets Field, Fenway Park, the Polo Grounds and Wrigley Field are the only venues which have hosted multiple tie-breaker games. Both games at the Polo Grounds came in the 1951 series.

One of the most famous moments in MLB history came in the final game of the 1951 National League tie-breaker series. Entering the bottom of the ninth inning the New York Giants were trailing the Dodgers 4–1. Al Dark and Don Mueller each singled to put runners on first and third base. Whitey Lockman hit a double, scoring Dark to make the game 4–2. Finally, Bobby Thomson hit a walk-off home run which has come to be known as the "Shot Heard 'Round the World" to give the Giants the 5–4 victory and the National League pennant. ESPN's SportsCentury ranked it as the second greatest game of the 20th century. In 1962, the first season of the NL expanded schedule to 162 games, the only best-of-three tie breaker in the 162-game season took place between the San Francisco Giants and Los Angeles Dodgers with the Giants winning 2–1. This was the longest regular season schedule ever played by 2 teams at 165 games, a record that will almost certainly never be matched. The 2000s saw three years of consecutive one-run tiebreaker games. The Rockies stormed back from a 2-run deficit in the 13th in 2007, winning 9–8 in a surprising run to the World Series that year. In 2008, a Jim Thome home run and a stellar performance by John Danks helped the White Sox edge out the Twins 1–0. The Twins ended up on the winning side the following year, tying the game in the 10th after going down a run and then walking off in the 12th inning to defeat the Tigers 6–5.

In 2018, two tiebreakers were played to conclude the season for the first time in MLB history. The NL West was decided between the Los Angeles Dodgers and the Colorado Rockies, while the NL Central was decided between the Milwaukee Brewers and the Chicago Cubs. The Dodgers and Brewers, the winners of these games, advanced to the NLDS, while the losers played each other in the Wild Card game.

Despite one team playing on their home field, tie-breakers have not favored the home team statistically, with the home team having gone 11–11 since the first tie-breaker game was played.

Starting with the 2022 season, as part of the new Collective Bargaining Agreement to end the 2021–22 Major League Baseball lockout, MLB added a third wild card team in each league, expanding the playoffs to 12 teams, and abolishing the tiebreaker game format. Ties will only be broken with a set of statistical procedures.

== Tie-breaking games and series ==
Key

Key to the tie-breakers
Title	The pennant, division, or wild card which the tie-breaker decided. Links to the tie-breaker game or series.
Winning/Losing team	The winning and losing team for the tie-breaker (for the overall series in the case of a best-of-three series)
Score(s)	Score of the game, extra innings noted in parentheses
Postseason result (winner)	Fate of team winning the tie-breaker in the subsequent postseason
Postseason result (loser)	Fate of team losing the tie-breaker in the subsequent postseason (if qualified)
*	Team subsequently won the World Series
#	Team subsequently lost the World Series
^	Tie-breaker was contested in a best-of-three series rather than a one-game playoff
Head-to-head	Head-to-head win/loss record and winning percentage of the winning vs. losing team during the regular season prior to the tie-breaker itself

Tie-breaker games and series
Title	Winning team	Score(s)	Losing team	Site(s)	Postseason result		Head-to-head	Ref.
Title	Winning team	Score(s)	Losing team	Site(s)	Winner	Loser	Head-to-head	Ref.
1946 NL pennant	St. Louis Cardinals	4–2, 8–4^	Brooklyn Dodgers	Sportsman's Park (Game 1); Ebbets Field (Game 2)	Won WS 4–3 (Red Sox)*	Did not qualify	14–8 (.636)	
1948 AL pennant	Cleveland Indians	8–3	Boston Red Sox	Fenway Park	Won WS 4–2 (Braves)*	Did not qualify	11–11 (.500)	
1951 NL pennant	New York Giants	3–1, 0–10, 5–4^	Brooklyn Dodgers	Ebbets Field (Game 1); Polo Grounds (Games 2, 3)	Lost WS 4–2 (Yankees)#	Did not qualify	9–13 (.409)	
1959 NL pennant	Los Angeles Dodgers	3–2, 6–5 (12)^	Milwaukee Braves	County Stadium (Game 1); Los Angeles Memorial Coliseum (Game 2)	Won WS 4–2 (White Sox)*	Did not qualify	12–10 (.545)	
1962 NL pennant	San Francisco Giants	8–0, 7–8, 6–4^	Los Angeles Dodgers	Candlestick Park (Game 1); Dodger Stadium (Games 2, 3)	Lost WS 4–3 (Yankees)#	Did not qualify	9–9 (.500)	
1978 AL East	New York Yankees	5–4	Boston Red Sox	Fenway Park	Won ALCS 3–1 (Royals), Won WS 4–2 (Dodgers)*	Did not qualify	8–7 (.533)	
1980 NL West	Houston Astros	7–1	Los Angeles Dodgers	Dodger Stadium	Lost NLCS 3–2 (Phillies)	Did not qualify	8–10 (.444)	
1995 AL West	Seattle Mariners	9–1	California Angels	Kingdome	Won ALDS 3–2 (Yankees), Lost ALCS 4–2 (Indians)	Did not qualify	5–7 (.417)	
1998 NL Wild Card	Chicago Cubs	5–3	San Francisco Giants	Wrigley Field	Lost NLDS 3–0 (Braves)	Did not qualify	6–3 (.667)	
1999 NL Wild Card	New York Mets	5–0	Cincinnati Reds	Cinergy Field	Won NLDS 3–1 (Diamondbacks), Lost NLCS 4–2 (Braves)	Did not qualify	4–5 (.444)	
2007 NL Wild Card	Colorado Rockies	9–8 (13)	San Diego Padres	Coors Field	Won NLDS 3–0 (Phillies), Won NLCS 4–0 (Diamondbacks), Lost WS 4–0 (Red Sox)#	Did not qualify	10–8 (.556)	
2008 AL Central	Chicago White Sox	1–0	Minnesota Twins	U.S. Cellular Field	Lost ALDS 3–1 (Rays)	Did not qualify	8–10 (.444)	
2009 AL Central	Minnesota Twins	6–5 (12)	Detroit Tigers	Hubert H. Humphrey Metrodome	Lost ALDS 3–0 (Yankees)	Did not qualify	11–7 (.611)	
2013 AL Wild Card	Tampa Bay Rays	5–2	Texas Rangers	Rangers Ballpark in Arlington	Won ALWC (Indians), Lost ALDS 3–1 (Red Sox)	Did not qualify	3–4 (.429)	
2018 NL Central	Milwaukee Brewers	3–1	Chicago Cubs	Wrigley Field	Won NLDS 3–0 (Rockies), Lost NLCS 4–3 (Dodgers)	Lost NLWC (Rockies)	8–11 (.421)	
2018 NL West	Los Angeles Dodgers	5–2	Colorado Rockies	Dodger Stadium	Won NLDS 3–1 (Braves), Won NLCS 4–3 (Brewers), Lost WS 4–1 (Red Sox)#	Won NLWC (Cubs), Lost NLDS 3–0 (Brewers)	12–7 (.632)	

=== Win–loss records by team ===
This only lists teams who participated in at least one tiebreaker game, and lists them under their current identities.

Team	Win–loss record†	Appearances
Atlanta Braves	0–1	1
Boston Red Sox	0–2	2
Chicago Cubs	1–1	2
Chicago White Sox	1–0	1
Cincinnati Reds	0–1	1
Cleveland Guardians	1–0	1
Colorado Rockies	1–1	2
Detroit Tigers	0–1	1
Houston Astros	1–0	1
Los Angeles Angels	0–1	1
Los Angeles Dodgers	2–4	6
Milwaukee Brewers	1–0	1
Minnesota Twins	1–1	2
New York Mets	1–0	1
New York Yankees	1–0	1
San Diego Padres	0–1	1
San Francisco Giants	2–1	3
Seattle Mariners	1–0	1
St. Louis Cardinals	1–0	1
Tampa Bay Rays	1–0	1
Texas Rangers	0–1	1

† In cases where a series was played, win–loss total reflects outcome of the series, not individual games.

== Team choices on tiebreaker designations ==
A tiebreaker involving three teams or more would have involved a more complex series of match-ups to determine what team(s) earned what playoff berth(s). This scenario never actually occurred but, on a few occasions, it was close enough that the teams involved selected tiebreaker designation in anticipation of such a scenario.

=== Three-way tie for one wild card spot ===
While such a tie had never occurred, teams within range were requested to choose between designations A, B, and C in case. Team A hosted Team B. The winner would then host Team C, with the winner of that game getting the wild card spot.

Year	Teams involved	1st Team's choice	2nd Team's choice	3rd Team's designation
2021	Red Sox, Mariners, Blue Jays	Red Sox chose C	Mariners chose A	Blue Jays given B
2021	Blue Jays, Yankees, Mariners	Blue Jays chose C	Yankees chose A	Mariners given B

=== Three-way tie for two wild card spots ===
While such a tie had never occurred, teams within range were requested to choose between designations A, B, and C in case. Team A hosted Team B, with the winner awarded one spot. Team C would host the loser of the first game, with the winner getting the other spot.

Year	Teams involved	1st Team's choice	2nd Team's choice	3rd Team's designation
2013	Indians, Rays, Rangers	Indians chose A	Rays chose B	Rangers given C
2016	Blue Jays, Orioles, Tigers	Blue Jays chose A	Orioles chose C	Tigers given B
2021	Red Sox, Blue Jays, Yankees	Red Sox chose A	Blue Jays chose B	Yankees given C
2021	Red Sox, Yankees, Mariners	Red Sox chose A	Yankees chose B	Mariners given C

=== Four-way tie for two wild card spots ===
While such a tie had never occurred, teams within range were requested to choose between designations A, B, C, and D in case. Team A hosted Team B. Team C hosted Team D. The winners of each game would have been awarded a wild-card spot.

Year	Teams within range	1st Team's choice	2nd Team's choice	3rd Team's choice	4th Team's designation
2021	Red Sox, Blue Jays, Yankees, Mariners	Red Sox chose A	Blue Jays chose C	Yankees chose B	Mariners given D
