= 2018 National League Championship Series =

Team (Wins)	Managers	Season
Los Angeles Dodgers (4)	Dave Roberts	92–71 (.564), GA: 1
Milwaukee Brewers (3)	Craig Counsell	96–67 (.589), GA: 1
- Dates: October 12–20
- MVP: Cody Bellinger (Los Angeles)
- Umpires: Scott Barry (Games 1–2), Gerry Davis (crew chief), Greg Gibson (Games 3–7), Brian Gorman, Alan Porter, Hunter Wendelstedt, Jim Wolf

Broadcast
- Television: FS1 (Games 1, 3–7); Fox (Game 2)
- TV announcers: Joe Buck, John Smoltz, Ken Rosenthal and Tom Verducci
- Radio: ESPN
- Radio announcers: Dan Shulman, Chris Singleton and Buster Olney
- NLDS: Milwaukee Brewers over Colorado Rockies (3–0); Los Angeles Dodgers over Atlanta Braves (3–1)

The 2018 National League Championship Series was a best-of-seven playoff in Major League Baseball’s 2018 postseason pitting the top-seeded Milwaukee Brewers against the second seed Los Angeles Dodgers, for the National League (NL) pennant and the right to play in the 2018 World Series against the AL Champions, the Boston Red Sox.

The series was the 49th in league history, with Fox airing all games in the United States. This series was the first time two teams that won their division in a tiebreaker game faced each other in a playoff series, as well as the first playoff matchup between the Brewers and Dodgers. For the first time since 2012, the NLCS reached a game seven, with the Dodgers defeating the Brewers and winning back-to-back pennants for the first time since 1977–1978. The Dodgers lost in five games to the Boston Red Sox in the World Series.

For the second year, Major League Baseball sold presenting sponsorships to all of its postseason series; as with the ALCS, this NLCS was sponsored by Google Assistant and was officially known as the National League Championship Series presented by Google Assistant.

== Background ==
The Brewers won the National League Central division for the first time since 2011 in a tie-breaker game over the Chicago Cubs at Wrigley Field, and then swept the Colorado Rockies in the National League Division Series. Dating back to the regular season, the Brewers had won 11 straight going into the NLCS. By virtue of their regular season record, highest in the league, the Brewers held homefield advantage throughout the National League playoffs.

This was the Brewers’ third League Championship Series and second in the National League, their prior NL appearance being a 2011 NLCS loss to the St. Louis Cardinals in six games. Milwaukee also appeared in and won the 1982 ALCS, occurring during their 29-year stay in the American League.

Like the Brewers, the Dodgers won the National League West in a tie-breaker game, defeating the Colorado Rockies at Dodger Stadium for their sixth straight division title. The Dodgers then beat the Atlanta Braves in four games in the National League Division Series. This was the Dodgers’ third straight appearance in the NLCS, and their fourth appearance in the past six seasons. Overall, this was their 13th NLCS trip, tying the Cardinals for most appearances by a team.

This was the first ever playoff matchup between the Brewers and Dodgers. The two cities did meet with the pennant on the line in 1959 when the Dodgers beat the Milwaukee Braves (now the Atlanta Braves) in a best-of-three playoff. However, MLB counts the tie-breaker series as regular season games.

This was also the first ever League Championship Series between two teams that won tiebreakers, and only the third postseason meeting of any sort between two MLB teams involved in tiebreakers. The first ever such meeting was the 2018 National League Wild Card Game in which the Rockies defeated the Cubs and the second was the NLDS in which the Brewers defeated the Rockies.

Los Angeles won four of their seven games against Milwaukee during the regular season.

The Brewers and Dodgers were considered the most serious suitors for Manny Machado, the biggest star traded near the 2018 trade deadline. On July 18, 2018, Machado was traded to the Los Angeles Dodgers for Yusniel Diaz, Dean Kremer, Rylan Bannon, Breyvic Valera and Zach Pop. He made his debut as a Dodger on July 20 against the Milwaukee Brewers and had two singles and two walks. Throughout the National League Championship Series, Machado caught the ire of Brewer fans for his controversial play.

=== Team statistics ===
For the 2018 regular season.

Stat	Los Angeles (MLB rank)	Milwaukee (MLB rank)	Type
Batting average	.250 (14th)	.252 (12th)	Batting
OPS	.774 (3rd)	.747 (9th)	Batting
Home runs	235 (2nd)	218 (4th)	Batting
ERA	3.38 (2nd)	3.73 (5th)	Pitching
Strikeouts	1,565 (3rd)	1,428 (9th)	Pitching
BAA	.230 (4th)	.233 (5th)	Pitching

== Summary ==
Los Angeles won the series, 4–3.

Game	Date	Score	Location	Time	Attendance
1	October 12	Los Angeles Dodgers – 5, Milwaukee Brewers – 6	Miller Park	4:02	43,615
2	October 13	Los Angeles Dodgers – 4, Milwaukee Brewers – 3	Miller Park	3:31	43,905
3	October 15	Milwaukee Brewers – 4, Los Angeles Dodgers – 0	Dodger Stadium	3:25	52,793
4	October 16	Milwaukee Brewers – 1, Los Angeles Dodgers – 2 (13)	Dodger Stadium	5:15	53,764
5	October 17	Milwaukee Brewers – 2, Los Angeles Dodgers – 5	Dodger Stadium	3:35	54,502
6	October 19	Los Angeles Dodgers – 2, Milwaukee Brewers – 7	Miller Park	3:34	43,619
7	October 20	Los Angeles Dodgers – 5, Milwaukee Brewers – 1	Miller Park	3:15	44,097

== Game summaries ==
=== Game 1 ===
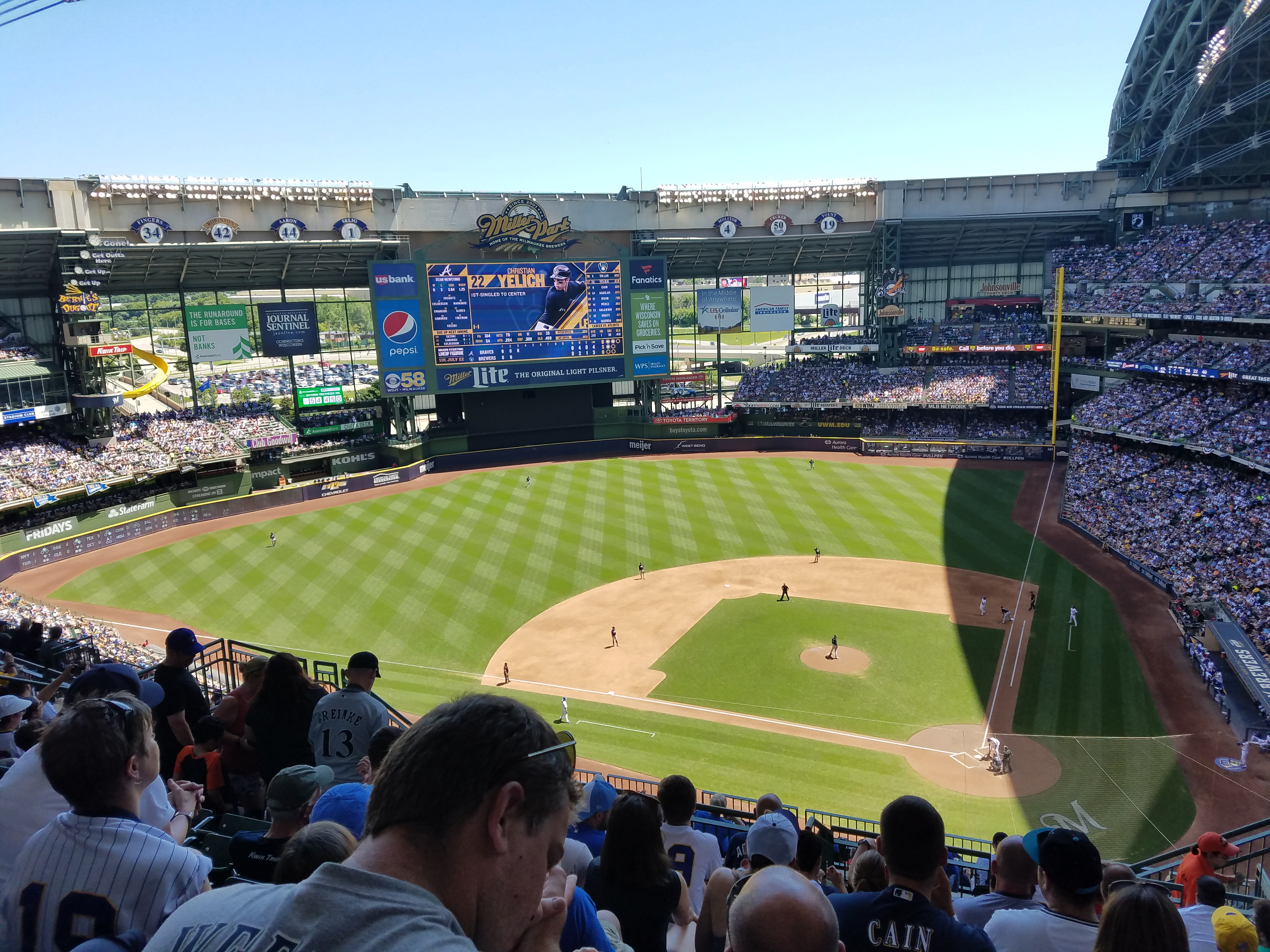
Miller Park hosted its first NLCS since 2011

October 12, 2018 7:10 pm (CDT) at Miller Park in Milwaukee, Wisconsin, 65 °F (18 °C), roof closed
Team	1	2	3	4	5	6	7	8	9	R	H	E
Los Angeles	0	1	0	0	0	0	0	3	1	5	8	4
Milwaukee	0	0	2	3	0	0	1	0	X	6	11	0
WP: Brandon Woodruff (1–0) LP: Clayton Kershaw (0–1) Sv: Corey Knebel (1); Home runs: LAD: Manny Machado (1); MIL: Brandon Woodruff (1), Jesús Aguilar (1); Attendance: 43,615; Boxscore

Brewers announcer and former MLB player Bob Uecker threw the ceremonial first pitch. Clayton Kershaw started game one for the Dodgers, while Gio González started for the Brewers. The Dodgers scored first, on a homer by Manny Machado in the second inning, which was the only run and hit allowed by González who was replaced after only two innings. His replacement, relief pitcher Brandon Woodruff, homered off Kershaw to tie the game in the third inning. A sacrifice fly by Hernán Pérez scored Lorenzo Cain to put the Brewers up 2–1 after three. A two-run pinch-hit single by Domingo Santana in the fourth inning extended the lead to three and a single by Ryan Braun scored Santana to make it 5–1. Kershaw allowed five runs on six hits and two walks in a little over three innings, the shortest post-season outing of his career. Yasmani Grandal of the Dodgers became the first catcher in post-season history to have two errors and two passed balls in the same game. The Brewers added on to their lead when Jesús Aguilar hit a homer off of Julio Urías in the seventh inning. The Dodgers loaded the bases in the eighth inning against Joakim Soria and managed to score three runs on back-to-back RBI singles by Machado and Matt Kemp off of Jeremy Jeffress to narrow the gap to 6–4. Chris Taylor hit an RBI triple in the ninth off Corey Knebel, who managed to retire Justin Turner to save the 6–5 win for the Brewers.

Brandon Woodruff became only the third relief pitcher in major league history to homer in a postseason game, matching the feat of Rosy Ryan (in Game 3 of the 1924 World Series) and Travis Wood (in Game 2 of the 2016 NLDS).

=== Game 2 ===
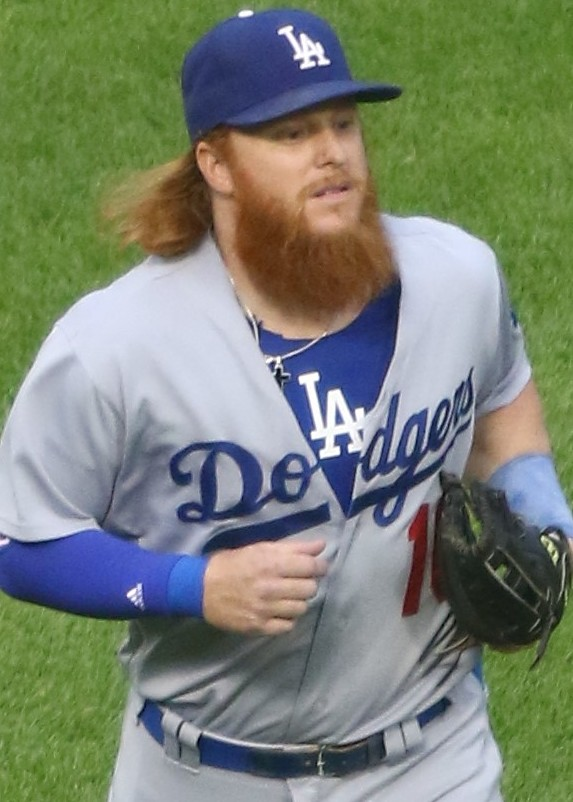
Justin Turner's two-run homer gave Los Angeles the lead, and ultimately the win, in Game 2.

October 13, 2018 3:10 pm (CDT) at Miller Park in Milwaukee, Wisconsin, 68 °F (20 °C), roof closed
Team	1	2	3	4	5	6	7	8	9	R	H	E
Los Angeles	0	0	0	0	0	0	2	2	0	4	9	0
Milwaukee	0	0	0	0	2	1	0	0	0	3	7	0
WP: Pedro Báez (1–0) LP: Jeremy Jeffress (0–1) Sv: Kenley Jansen (1); Home runs: LAD: Justin Turner (1); MIL: Orlando Arcia (1), Travis Shaw (1); Attendance: 43,905; Boxscore

Former Brewers All-Star player Prince Fielder threw the ceremonial first pitch. Hyun-jin Ryu started the second game for the Dodgers and Wade Miley for the Brewers. The game remained scoreless into the fifth inning, when Orlando Arcia hit a homer to put the Brewers on the board. They scored a second run on an RBI groundout by Ryan Braun. Ryu was lifted after 4 1/3 innings, he allowed two runs on six hits with four strikeouts. Miley pitched 5 2/3 shutout innings with no walks and only two hits allowed. Travis Shaw homered off Alex Wood in the sixth inning to extend the lead to three. An RBI single by Cody Bellinger in the seventh inning off Corbin Burnes gave the Dodgers their first run of the game. A bases loaded walk issued by Jeremy Jeffress scored another run for the Dodgers. The Dodgers took the lead in the top of the eighth when Justin Turner hit a two-run home run off of Jeffress. This was Turner's second career go-ahead home run in the seventh inning or later in the postseason, joining Kirk Gibson as the only other Dodger to accomplish this feat multiple times. The Dodgers bullpen kept the Brewers from scoring and they won the game 4–3 to even up the series at one all. Kenley Jansen earned his second save of the postseason. This was the Brewers first loss since September 22.

=== Game 3 ===
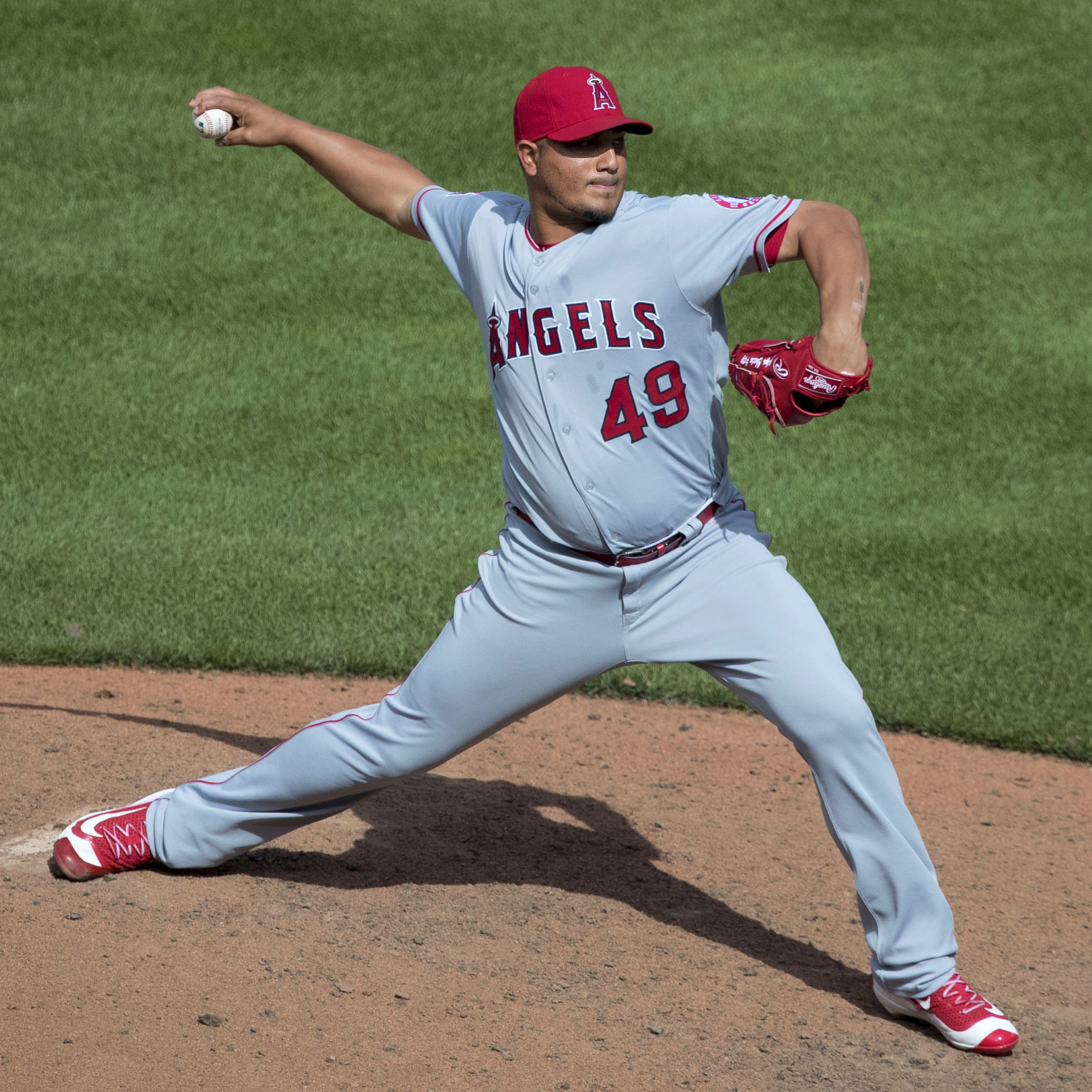
Brewers starter Jhoulys Chacín, seen here with the Angels in 2016, was the Game 3 winning pitcher.

October 15, 2018 4:40 pm (PDT) at Dodger Stadium in Los Angeles, California, 81 °F (27 °C), sunny
Team	1	2	3	4	5	6	7	8	9	R	H	E
Milwaukee	1	0	0	0	0	1	2	0	0	4	7	1
Los Angeles	0	0	0	0	0	0	0	0	0	0	5	1
WP: Jhoulys Chacín (1–0) LP: Walker Buehler (0–1); Home runs: MIL: Orlando Arcia (2); LAD: None; Attendance: 52,793; Boxscore

Former Dodgers All-Star player Andre Ethier threw the ceremonial first pitch. The Dodgers' starting pitcher was Walker Buehler, while the Brewers started Jhoulys Chacín. The Brewers scored in the top of the first inning, when Christian Yelich walked and Ryan Braun drove him in with a double. The Brewers added a second run in the sixth inning when Travis Shaw tripled and then scored on a wild pitch by Buehler. Chacín pitched 5 1/3 innings, and allowed only three hits and two walks while striking out six batters. Orlando Arcia hit a two-run homer in the seventh to put the Brewers up 4–0. Buehler pitched seven innings, allowing four runs on five hits with eight strikeouts. The Dodgers loaded the bases in the ninth against Jeremy Jeffress, but Brian Dozier struck out looking to end the game. The Brewers finished off a five-hit shutout of the Dodgers to take a two games to one lead. It was the first time the Dodgers had been shutout in a playoff game at home since Game 1 of the 1983 NLCS.

=== Game 4 ===
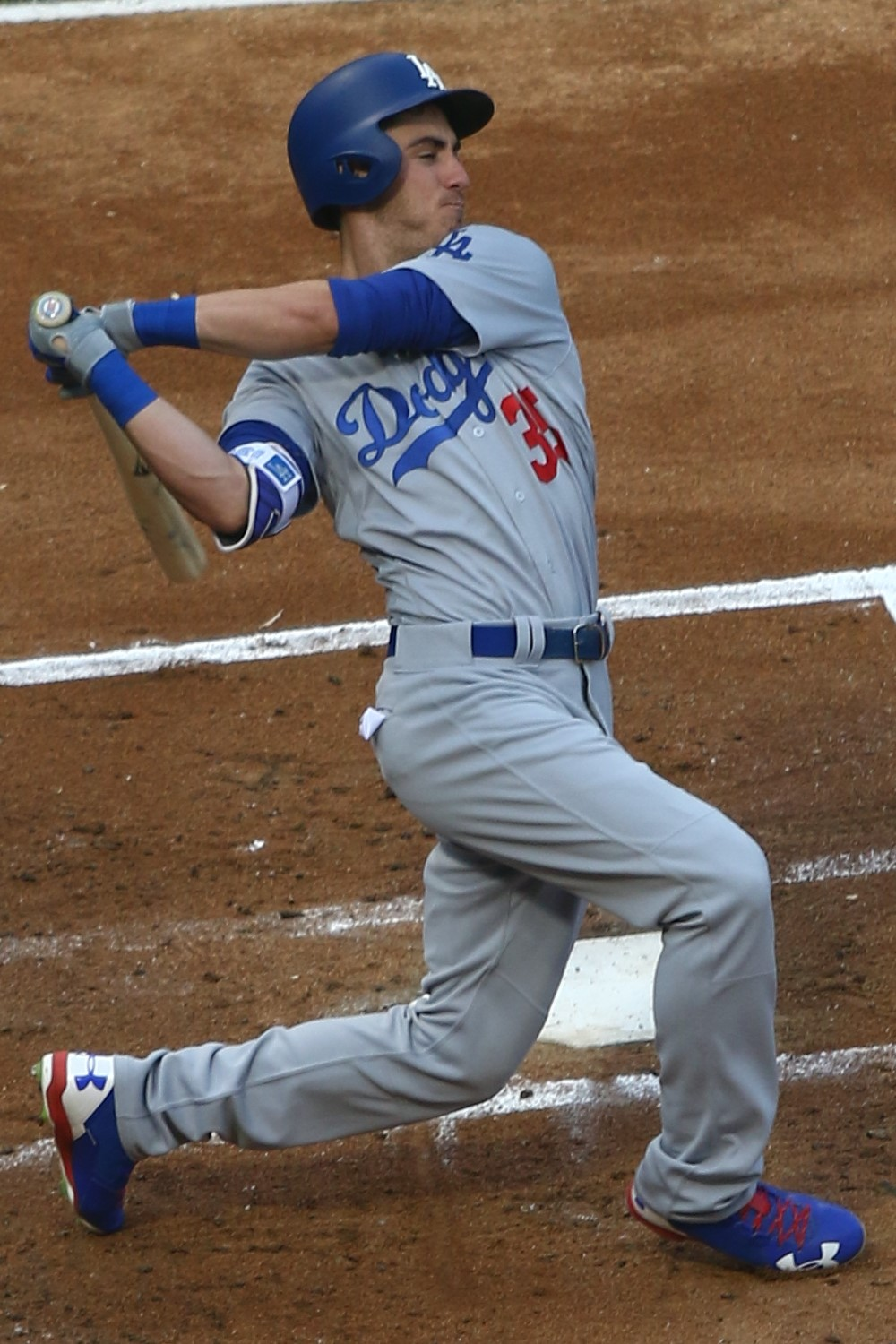
Cody Bellinger had the game winning RBI single in the 13th inning in Game 4 to tie the NLCS at two games apiece.

October 16, 2018 6:10 pm (PDT) at Dodger Stadium in Los Angeles, California, 74 °F (23 °C), clear
Team	1	2	3	4	5	6	7	8	9	10	11	12	13	R	H	E
Milwaukee	0	0	0	0	1	0	0	0	0	0	0	0	0	1	8	0
Los Angeles	1	0	0	0	0	0	0	0	0	0	0	0	1	2	7	0
WP: Julio Urías (1–0) LP: Junior Guerra (0–1); Attendance: 53,764; Boxscore

For Game 4, former Dodger All-Star Shawn Green threw the ceremonial first pitch. The Brewers started Gio González on short rest, after his Game 1 start. The Dodgers countered with Rich Hill, making his first appearance of the series. The Dodgers took an early lead on a RBI single by Brian Dozier in the bottom of the first inning. González left the game in the second inning after injuring his ankle fielding a grounder from the first batter of the inning. He allowed one run on two hits and one walk. Domingo Santana tied the game up, driving Orlando Arcia in with a pinch hit double in the fifth inning. Hill pitched five innings, with the one run allowed on three hits and three walks with six strikeouts. There was no further scoring through the end of regulation. In the 10th inning, benches briefly emptied after Manny Machado appeared to intentionally kick Milwaukee first baseman Jesús Aguilar on a ground out. In the bottom of the 13th, Machado singled with one out, and advanced to second on a wild pitch with two outs. Cody Bellinger hit a walk-off single to score Machado. Junior Guerra picked up the loss in his fourth inning of relief for Milwaukee, while Julio Urías, who had pitched the top of the 13th for Los Angeles, got the win. The game lasted five hours and 15 minutes, making it the second longest NLCS game; Game 5 of the 1999 NLCS had lasted five hours and 46 minutes.

=== Game 5 ===
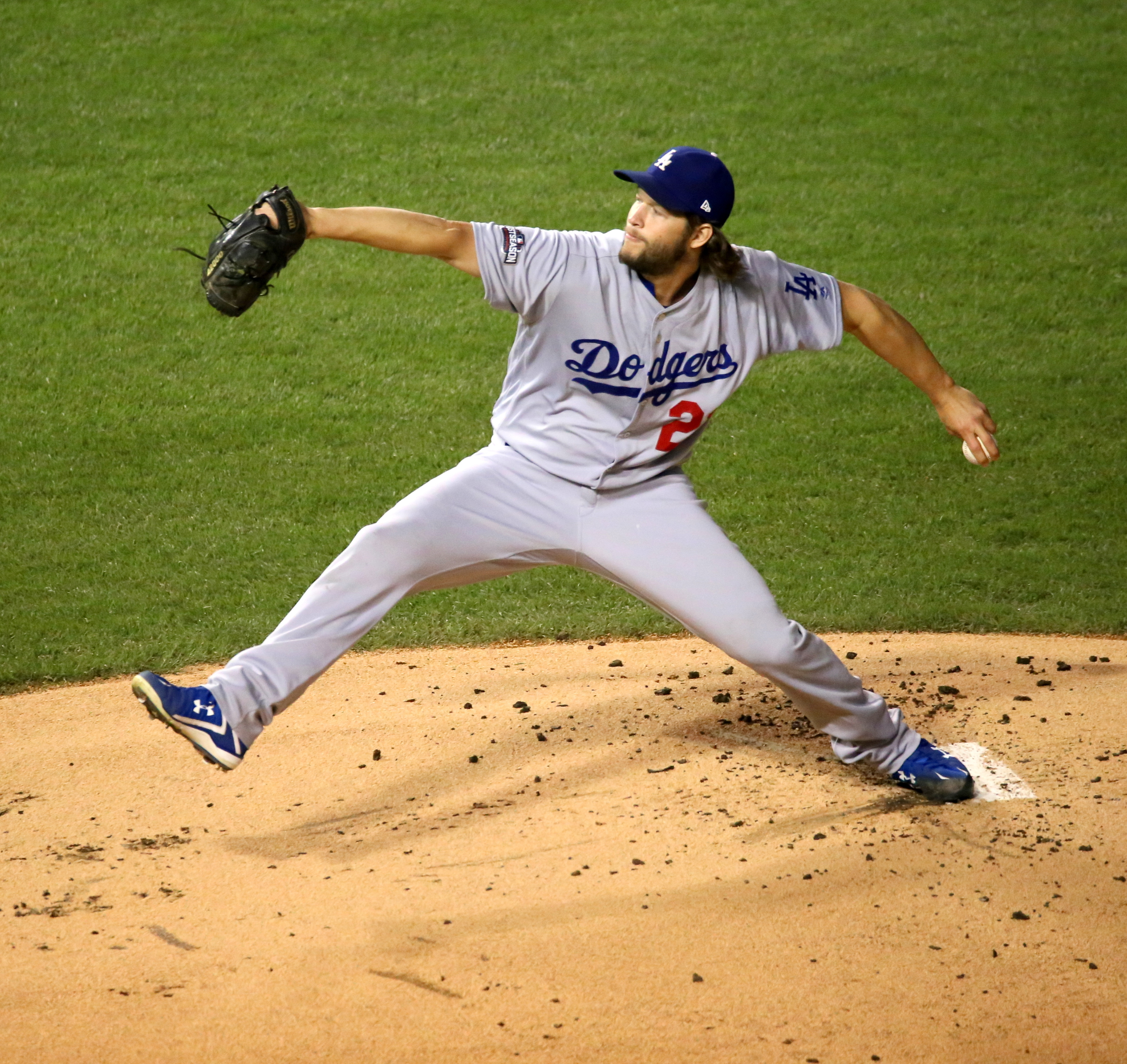
In Game 5, Clayton Kershaw allowed just one run in seven innings pitched, getting the win as the Dodgers went ahead in the series, 3–2.

October 17, 2018 2:06 pm (PDT) at Dodger Stadium in Los Angeles, California, 82 °F (28 °C), sunny
Team	1	2	3	4	5	6	7	8	9	R	H	E
Milwaukee	0	0	1	0	0	0	0	0	1	2	5	1
Los Angeles	0	0	0	0	1	2	2	0	X	5	9	0
WP: Clayton Kershaw (1–1) LP: Brandon Woodruff (1–1) Sv: Kenley Jansen (2); Attendance: 54,502; Boxscore

With the series tied 2–2, this game featured the second starts of the series for Clayton Kershaw and for the Brewers Wade Miley, the latter of whom was pitching on short rest. Miley (who throws left-handed) walked the first batter he faced and was immediately removed by Brewers manager Craig Counsell in favor of Brandon Woodruff (who throws right-handed). The Brewers got on the board first in the third inning with an RBI double by Lorenzo Cain. Austin Barnes drove in Chris Taylor with a single in the fifth inning to tie the score. A single by Max Muncy drove in the go-ahead run (Justin Turner) in the sixth inning. A pinch-hit single by Yasiel Puig added another run to put the Dodgers up by two after six innings. Woodruff wound up pitching 5 1/3 innings, and allowed the three runs on five hits, one walk and two hit batters while striking out eight. In the seventh inning, the Dodgers added two more runs. Turner drove in a run with a single off Joakim Soria and another run scored on a ground out by pinch hitter Brian Dozier. Kershaw pitched seven innings, allowing one run on three hits and two walks while striking out nine. He also walked twice as a batter, becoming just the third pitcher in the last 20 years to do so in a playoff game (Jon Lester in the 2016 NLCS and Derek Lowe in the 2008 NLDS). Pinch hitter Curtis Granderson doubled in a run off Ryan Madson in the ninth inning to cut the score to 5–2. Kenley Jansen came in and struck out Mike Moustakas to end the game.

=== Game 6 ===
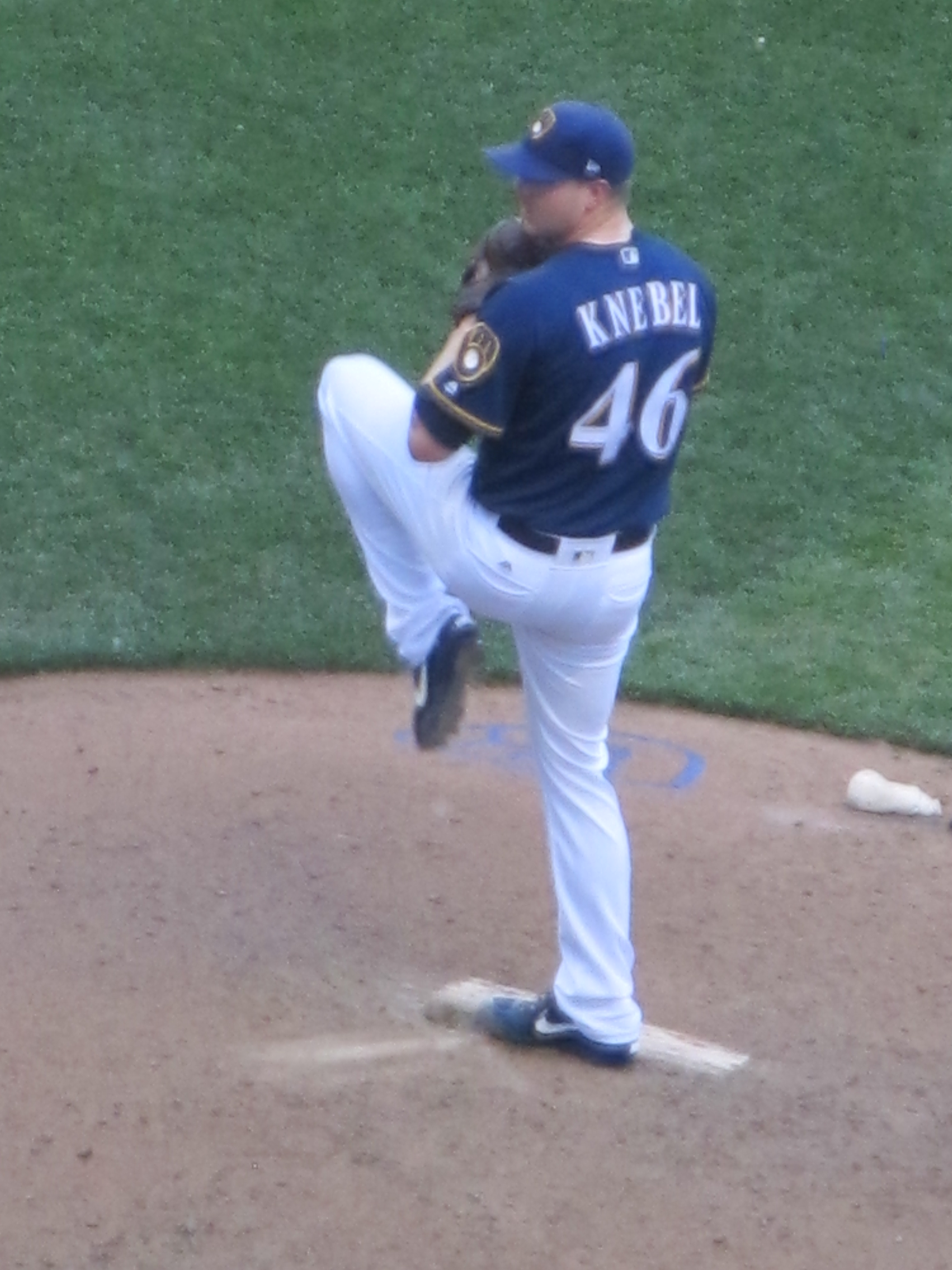
Milwaukee reliever Corey Knebel pitched 1 2/3 innings without allowing a hit and got the Game 6 win.

October 19, 2018 7:39 pm (CDT) at Miller Park in Milwaukee, Wisconsin, 66 °F (19 °C), roof closed
Team	1	2	3	4	5	6	7	8	9	R	H	E
Los Angeles	1	0	0	0	1	0	0	0	0	2	5	0
Milwaukee	4	1	0	0	0	0	1	1	X	7	11	0
WP: Corey Knebel (1–0) LP: Hyun-jin Ryu (0–1); Home runs: LAD: David Freese (1); MIL: None; Attendance: 43,619; Boxscore

The sixth game in the series featured a rematch between Game 2 starters Hyun-jin Ryu and Wade Miley. Following his abbreviated start in Game 5, when he faced a single batter, Miley became the first pitcher in 88 years to start back-to-back games in the postseason. The last pitcher to do so was George Earnshaw of the Philadelphia Athletics in the 1930 World Series. Miley also was just the sixth pitcher to start three games in a league championship series. Commissioner Emeritus of Baseball and former Brewers owner Bud Selig threw the ceremonial first pitch. David Freese, batting leadoff for the first time in the series, opened the game with a home run off of Miley to give the Dodgers the lead. Back-to-back RBI doubles by Jesús Aguilar and Mike Moustakas and a RBI single by Erik Kratz scored four runs for the Brewers in the bottom of the inning. A double by Ryan Braun added another run in the second. Ryu was removed after three innings. He allowed five runs on seven hits and two walks with only three strikeouts. Freese drove in a second run for the Dodgers in the fifth inning with a double. Miley allowed two runs on five hits and two walks with four strikeouts in 4 1/3 innings. A wild pitch by Kenta Maeda in the seventh inning scored another run and a single by Aguilar off Rich Hill in the eighth put the Brewers up 7–2, which wound up being the final score, setting up a game seven.

For his role in the benches clearing confrontation in Game 4, Manny Machado was booed by Milwaukee fans for the entirety of all his at bats throughout the remainder of the series.

=== Game 7 ===
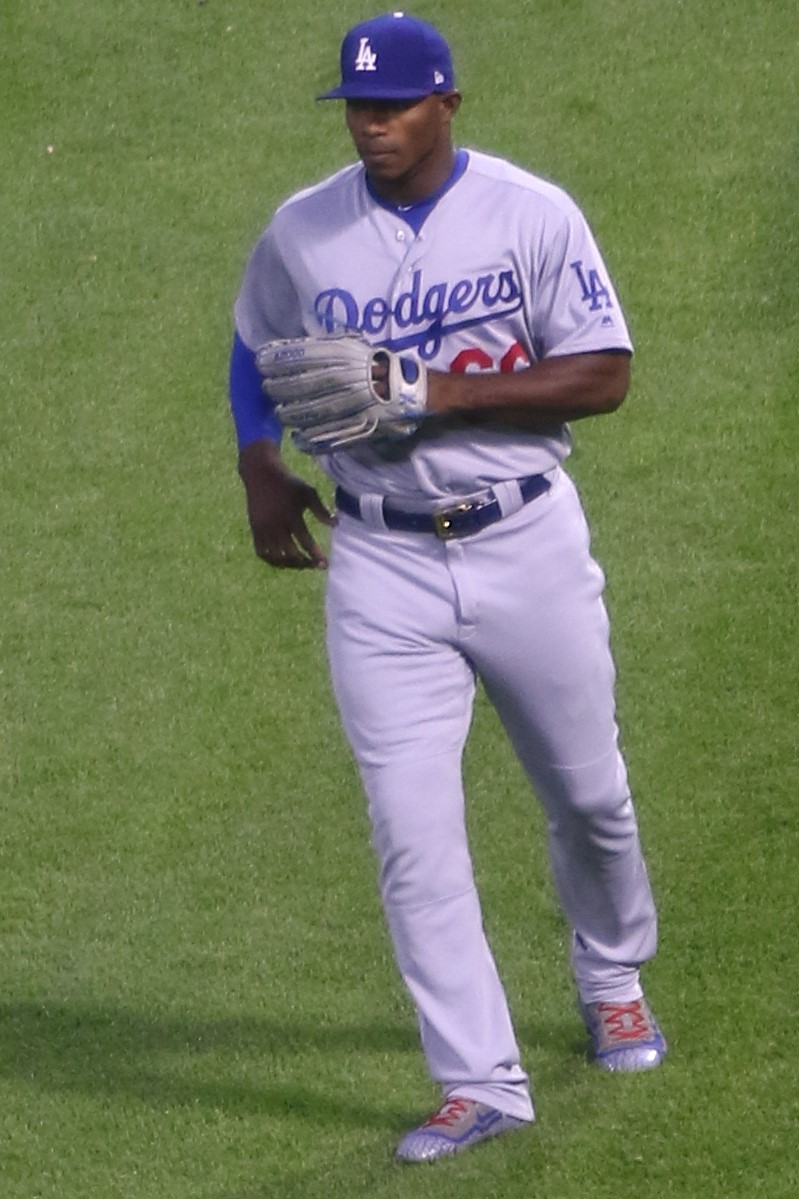
Yasiel Puig's three-run homer in the sixth inning were the final runs in a 5–1 Dodgers victory.

October 20, 2018 7:10 pm (CDT) at Miller Park in Milwaukee, Wisconsin, 64 °F (18 °C), roof closed
Team	1	2	3	4	5	6	7	8	9	R	H	E
Los Angeles	0	2	0	0	0	3	0	0	0	5	10	0
Milwaukee	1	0	0	0	0	0	0	0	0	1	7	0
WP: Ryan Madson (1–0) LP: Jhoulys Chacín (1–1); Home runs: LAD: Cody Bellinger (1), Yasiel Puig (1); MIL: Christian Yelich (1); Attendance: 44,097; Boxscore

For the first time since 2012, when the Giants defeated the Cardinals, and the tenth time in NLCS history, the NLCS went to a game 7. With this NLCS the Dodgers tied for the fourth-most game sevens in history with the Pittsburgh Pirates and the Boston Red Sox. The starting pitchers—Walker Buehler for Los Angeles and Jhoulys Chacín for Milwaukee—were the same as Game 3, won by the Brewers. Hall of Fame inductee and former Brewer Robin Yount threw the ceremonial first pitch. Christian Yelich homered off Buehler in the first inning to give the Brewers the early lead and then Cody Bellinger hit a two-run homer in the second to put the Dodgers on top. Chacín only pitched the first two innings, allowing two runs on three hits and one walk. Buehler pitched 4 2/3 innings, allowing one run on six hits with seven strikeouts. Chris Taylor made a run saving catch in the bottom of the fifth off the bat of Yelich and then Yasiel Puig hit a three-run home run off Jeremy Jeffress in the sixth to extend the lead. The Dodgers would go on to win 5–1 as Clayton Kershaw retired Shaw, Aguilar and Moustakas to claim their second straight National League title, 40 years after they accomplished the feat in 1977 and 1978. The Dodgers were the first team to clinch a pennant on the road in a game seven since the 2006 Cardinals and they became first tiebreaker team since the 2007 Colorado Rockies to reach the World Series. This was also Los Angeles' first playoff series win where they did not win Game 1 since the 1988 NLCS, a span of 18 playoff series in between.

Cody Bellinger was named the NLCS MVP, becoming the youngest player to win the award.

=== Composite line score ===
2018 NLCS (4–3): Los Angeles Dodgers beat Milwaukee Brewers

Team	1	2	3	4	5	6	7	8	9	10	11	12	13	R	H	E
Los Angeles Dodgers	2	3	0	0	2	5	4	5	1	0	0	0	1	23	53	5
Milwaukee Brewers	6	1	3	3	3	2	4	1	1	0	0	0	0	24	56	2
Total attendance: 336,295 Average attendance: 48,042

== See also ==
- 2018 American League Championship Series
- Milwaukee Brewers reverse World Series curse
