= Germán Márquez =

Venezuelan baseball player (born 1995)

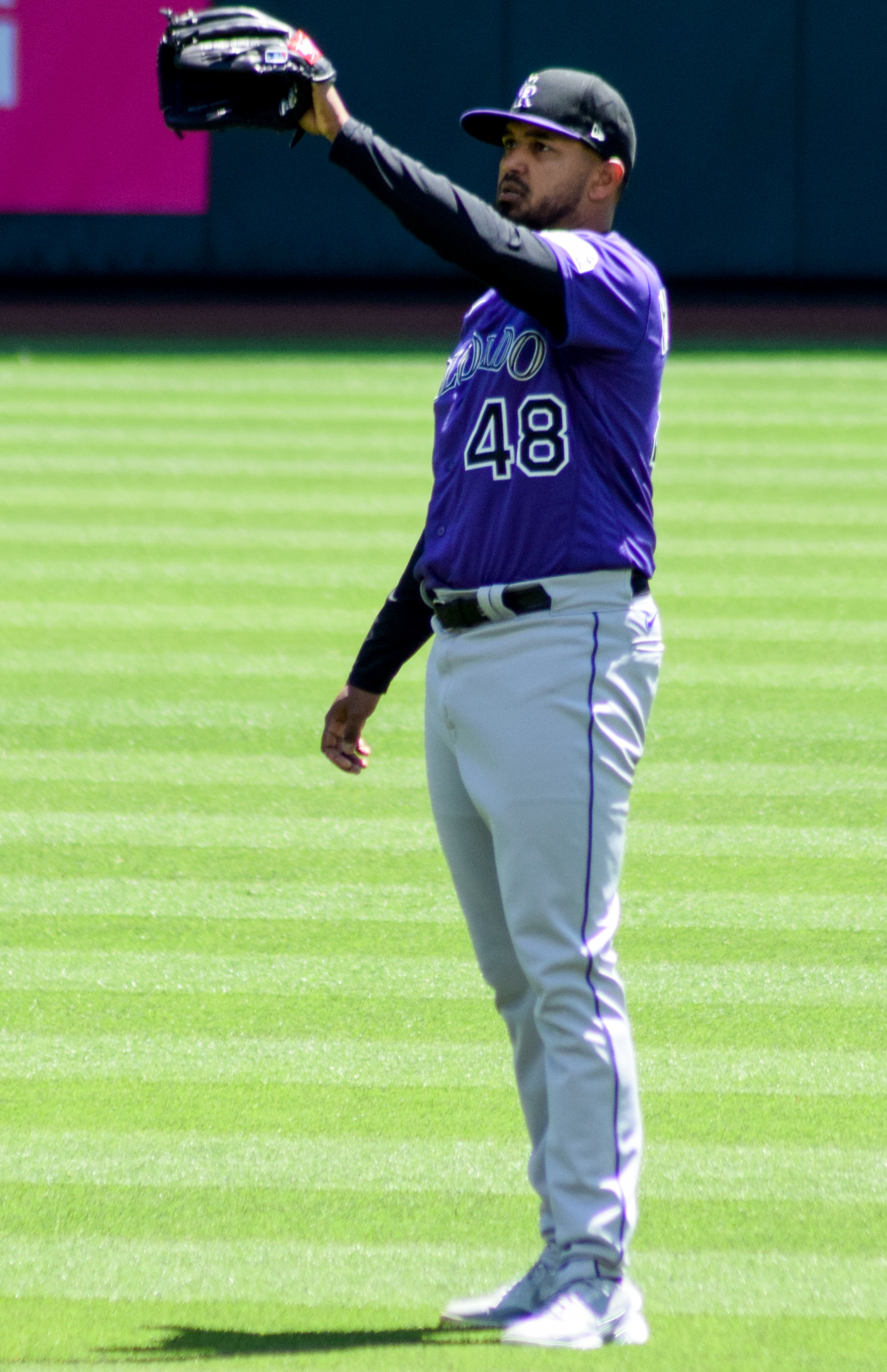
- Márquez with the Colorado Rockies in 2021

Free agent
- Pitcher
- Born: February 22, 1995 (age 31); San Félix, Bolívar, Venezuela
- Bats: Right Throws: Right

MLB debut
- September 8, 2016, for the Colorado Rockies

MLB statistics (through 2026 season)
- Win–loss record: 72–74
- Earned run average: 4.67
- Strikeouts: 1,105
- Stats at Baseball Reference

Teams
- Colorado Rockies (2016–2025); San Diego Padres (2026)

Career highlights and awards
- All-Star (2021); Silver Slugger Award (2018)

Germán Andres Márquez (born February 22, 1995) is a Venezuelan professional baseball pitcher who is a free agent. He has previously played in Major League Baseball (MLB) for the Colorado Rockies and San Diego Padres. He made his MLB debut in 2016. Márquez won a Silver Slugger Award in 2018 and was an All-Star in 2021.

== Career ==
=== Tampa Bay Rays ===
Márquez signed with the Tampa Bay Rays as an international free agent on July 6, 2011, for a $225,000 signing bonus. He steadily advanced through the team's minor league system over the next five years. He pitched for the Venezuela Summer League Rays in 2012, with a rocky 6.82 earned run average (ERA) in 34 1/3 innings. Márquez made his American debut the following year with the Rookie-league Princeton Rays, logging a 2-5 record and 4.05 ERA with 38 strikeouts in 12 starts.

In 2014, Márquez pitched for the Single-A Bowling Green Hot Rods, logging a 5-7 record and 3.21 ERA with 95 strikeouts across 22 games (18 starts). In 2015, he moved up a level to the High-A Charlotte Stone Crabs, registering a 7–13 record and 3.56 ERA with 104 strikeouts across 26 appearances (23 starts). In his time in the Rays system, Márquez pitched primarily as a starter, with a cumulative 14–27 record, 3.88 ERA, and 266 strikeouts in 324 2/3 innings.

On November 20, 2015, the Rays added Márquez to their 40-man roster to protect him from the Rule 5 draft. He was ranked as the Rays' 25th best prospect by MLB.com.

=== Colorado Rockies (2016–2025) ===
==== 2016 ====
On January 28, 2016, the Rays traded Márquez and reliever Jake McGee to the Colorado Rockies in exchange for outfielder Corey Dickerson and infield prospect Kevin Padlo.

Márquez started 2016 with the Double-A Hartford Yard Goats and was promoted to the Triple-A Albuquerque Isotopes in early August. With both minor league clubs in 2016, he had an 11–6 record and 3.13 ERA with 155 strikeouts in 166 2/3 innings.

The Rockies promoted Márquez to the major leagues for the first time on September 6, 2016. After three relief appearances, he won his first MLB start, allowing one run in five innings in an 11–1 win over the St. Louis Cardinals. That was the highlight of a rocky first month in the majors. In total, he had with a 5.23 ERA in six games, three of them starts, with 15 strikeouts in 20 2/3 innings.

==== 2017–2018 ====
Márquez entered 2017 ranked as one of the top 75 prospects by MLB.com, Baseball America, and FanGraphs. In his first full MLB season, Márquez had a 11–7 record with a 4.39 ERA in 162 innings pitched across 29 starts. He had a 1.38 WHIP and 147 strikeouts. He threw in the strike zone more frequently than any other major league pitcher. He finished fifth in the National League Rookie of the Year voting. He was left off the Rockies Wild Card Game roster, after having started the second-to-last game of the regular season.

On July 11, 2018, Márquez hit his first career home run off second baseman and former teammate Daniel Descalso in a blowout 19–2 win over the Arizona Diamondbacks. Márquez became the first pitcher to hit a home run off a position player since Mike LaCoss in 1986. On August 8, he threw an immaculate inning, striking out three Pittsburgh Pirates batters on three pitches each. On September 26, Márquez tied the modern-day MLB record by striking out the first eight batters of a game against the Philadelphia Phillies, before pitcher Nick Pivetta reached base on an error on a 0–2 pitch.

Márquez had a dominant second half of 2018 after adding a slider to his pitch repertoire. He finished with a 14–11 record and 3.77 ERA. He had a quality start in 20 of his 33 starts and 230 strikeouts, fourth most in the NL, in 196 innings. He broke the franchise record for strikeouts in one season, previously set by Ubaldo Jiménez in 2010. Márquez's 10.56 strikeouts per 9 innings was a new Rockies record and fourth-most in the NL. Márquez also had a phenomenal season at the plate for a pitcher, hitting .300 with a home run, 5 RBIs, and a .650 on-base plus slugging. He won the Silver Slugger Award, the first Rockies pitcher to win the award since Mike Hampton in 2002. Marquez's performance, along with fellow second-year starter Kyle Freeland, helped the Rockies reach the postseason in back-to-back years for the first time in franchise history.

Márquez started the NL West tie-breaker game, picking up loss against the Los Angeles Dodgers after allowing two-run home runs to Cody Bellinger and Max Muncy in 4 2/3 innings. He pitched once in the playoffs, picking up the loss in the Rockies' season-ending 6–0 loss to the Milwaukee Brewers in Game 3 of the National League Division Series. He pitched serviceably, allowing two runs and striking out five in five innings.

==== 2019–2022 ====
On April 6, 2019, the Rockies and Márquez agreed to a five-year $43 million contract extension. On April 14, 2019, Márquez threw the first one-hit shutout in Rockies franchise history in a 4–0 win, yielding only a single to Evan Longoria in the 8th inning. In 2019, he started 28 games, winning 12, and had a 4.76 ERA before being placed on the injured list with right arm inflammation on August 26. He led the NL with 14 wild pitches. Though his ERA was a full run higher than in 2018, Marquez generally maintained his effectiveness from 2018. Additionally, Marquez's ERA was hampered by 3 games where he was not taken out despite struggling badly; the last of which was a home game on July 15 where he gave up a career-worst 11 earned runs in only 2 2/3 innings to the San Francisco Giants before he was removed.

Márquez made his first Opening Day start in July 2020. In the shortened 2020 season, Márquez went 4–6 with a 3.75 ERA in 13 starts. He led the National League with 81 2/3 innings pitched. On defense, he led all major league pitchers with three errors and had a .750 fielding percentage, the worst among qualified pitchers.

Márquez made his second Opening Day start in 2021. On June 29, he took a no-hit bid into the 9th inning against Pittsburgh, but a leadoff single by Ka'ai Tom broke it up. Márquez finished the game with his second career one-hit shutout and first Maddux. He was named to his first All-Star team, the Rockies' sole representative. He pitched a scoreless fourth inning in the game at Coors Field. Márquez hit his second career MLB home run on July 31, against Yu Darvish of the San Diego Padres.

Márquez finished the 2021 season with a 12–11 record, 4.40 ERA, and 176 strikeouts over 180 innings in 32 starts. He led the major leagues with 15 wild pitches. He was a finalist for the Silver Slugger Award, losing out to Max Fried.

In 2022, Márquez was 9–13 with a 4.95 ERA and 150 strikeouts in 181 2/3 innings, his most since 2018. Hitters had a .467 slugging percentage against Márquez, the ninth highest among MLB qualified pitchers.

==== 2023–2024 ====
In 2023, Márquez again started for the Rockies on Opening Day. He made 4 starts for Colorado, registering a 2–2 record and 4.95 ERA with 17 strikeouts in 20 innings pitched. On May 2, 2023, it was revealed that Márquez would require Tommy John surgery, ending his season. On September 8, Márquez and the Rockies agreed to a two-year contract extension worth $20 million. The extension lasted through the end of the 2025 season and bought out the final year of his previous extension.

On July 14, 2024, Márquez was activated from the injured list to make his return from surgery. He made only one start, allowing 3 runs in four innings against the New York Mets. In that start, he broke the Rockies' franchise strikeout record, passing Jorge de la Rosa. On August 8, manager Bud Black announced that Márquez would miss the remainder of the season after suffering a stress reaction in his elbow.

==== 2025 ====
On April 24, 2025, Márquez recorded his 1,000th strikeout as a pitcher when he struck out Vinnie Pasquantino in the bottom of the fourth inning. He became the first pitcher to achieve 1,000 strikeouts while pitching for the Rockies. Márquez made 26 total starts for Colorado during the regular season, compiling a 3-16 record and 6.70 ERA with 83 strikeouts across 126 1/3 innings pitched.

=== San Diego Padres (2026) ===
On February 16, 2026, Márquez signed a one-year contract with the San Diego Padres that contains a mutual option for the 2027 season. He made 13 appearances (including 10 starts) for the Padres, compiling a 4–2 record and 5.26 ERA with 37 strikeouts and one save across 53 innings pitched. Márquez was designated for assignment by the team on August 5. He was released by San Diego after clearing waivers on August 8.

=== Minnesota Twins ===
On August 13, 2026, Márquez signed a minor league contract with the Minnesota Twins. In 6 starts with Triple-A St. Paul Saints he threw 28 innings going 0-3 with a 5.46 ERA and 17 strikeouts. He elected free agency on November 2.

== Personal life ==
Márquez and his wife Dilvanny married in 2019. They have a son named Damien, born in 2018. His wife and son first saw him pitch in the United States in 2021, due to visa issues. Márquez's parents are Germán Márquez and Oniela Rojas. He has an older sister, Hendyma, and a younger brother, Geremia.

== See also ==
- List of Major League Baseball single-inning strikeout leaders
- List of Major League Baseball players from Venezuela
