= 2018 National League Division Series =

American baseball games

Teams
| Team (Wins) | | Manager | Season |
| Milwaukee Brewers (3) | | Craig Counsell | 96–67 (.589), GA: 1 |
| Colorado Rockies (0) | | Bud Black | 91–72 (.558), GB: 1 |
- Dates: October 4–7
- Television: FS1 (Games 1–2); MLB Network (Game 3)
- TV announcers: Kenny Albert, A. J. Pierzynski, David Cone, and Jon Paul Morosi (FS1); Bob Costas, Jim Kaat, and Jon Paul Morosi (MLBN)
- Radio: ESPN
- Radio announcers: Dan Shulman and Chris Singleton
- Umpires: Ted Barrett (crew chief), Kerwin Danley, Alfonso Márquez, Mike Muchlinski, Todd Tichenor, John Tumpane

Teams
| Team (Wins) | | Manager | Season |
| Los Angeles Dodgers (3) | | Dave Roberts | 92–71 (.564), GA: 1 |
| Atlanta Braves (1) | | Brian Snitker | 90–72 (.556), GA: 8 |
- Dates: October 4–8
- Television: MLB Network (Game 1); FS1 (Games 2–4)
- TV announcers: Bob Costas (Game 1), Joe Davis (Games 2–4), John Smoltz, Ken Rosenthal (Games 2–4), and Tom Verducci
- Radio: ESPN
- Radio announcers: Chris Berman and Rick Sutcliffe
- Umpires: Lance Barksdale, Gary Cederstrom (crew chief), Doug Eddings, Tom Hallion, Adrian Johnson, Jim Reynolds
- NLWC: Colorado Rockies defeated Chicago Cubs, 2–1 (13)

The 2018 National League Division Series were two best-of-five playoff series on the National League side in Major League Baseball's 2018 postseason to determine the participating teams of the 2018 National League Championship Series. The three divisional winners (seeded 1–3) and a fourth team—the Wild Card Game winner—played in two series. These matchups were:

- (1) Milwaukee Brewers (NL Central champions) vs. (5) Colorado Rockies (Wild Card Game winner): Brewers won the series, 3–0.
- (2) Los Angeles Dodgers (NL West champions) vs. (3) Atlanta Braves (NL East champions): Dodgers won the series, 3–1.

The team with the better regular season record (higher-seed) in each series hosted Games 1, 2, and (if necessary) 5, and the lower seeded team hosted Games 3 and (if necessary) 4.

The Dodgers defeated the Brewers in the NLCS, then lost the 2018 World Series to the American League champion Boston Red Sox.

Under sponsorship agreements with Doosan, the series was formally known as the National League Division Series presented by Doosan. The Brewers and the Dodgers won their respective series to advance to the Championship Series.

== Background ==
The 2018 National League division races were unexpectedly surprising, considering the Nationals, Cubs, and Dodgers all came into the season as heavy betting favorites, and on the last day of the season, none of these teams had an outright lead in their division. The Brewers entered the NLDS as the top seed, having completed the regular season with a record of 96–67 and winning the NL Central via a tie-breaker game. The second-seeded Dodgers went 92–71 in the NL West, also winning their division via a tie-breaker game. The NL East champion Braves were seeded third via their 90–72 record. The final participant was the winner of the NL Wild Card Game, the Rockies. This was the first year in baseball history two divisions in the same league came down to a Game 163.

This was the 14th NLDS appearance for Atlanta, 13th for Los Angeles, fourth for Colorado and third for Milwaukee (who also played in the 1981 ALDS, before joining the National League in 1998).

The Brewers and Rockies met seven times during the regular season, with Milwaukee winning five of the games. The Dodgers and Braves also met seven times during the regular season, with Los Angeles holding a 5–2 edge.

== Matchups ==
=== Milwaukee Brewers vs. Colorado Rockies ===
Milwaukee won the series, 3–0.

| Game | Date | Score | Location | Time | Attendance |
|---|---|---|---|---|---|
| 1 | October 4 | Colorado Rockies – 2, Milwaukee Brewers – 3 (10) | Miller Park | 4:04 | 43,382 |
| 2 | October 5 | Colorado Rockies – 0, Milwaukee Brewers – 4 | Miller Park | 3:45 | 44,547 |
| 3 | October 7 | Milwaukee Brewers – 6, Colorado Rockies – 0 | Coors Field | 3:14 | 49,658 |

=== Los Angeles Dodgers vs. Atlanta Braves ===
Los Angeles won the series, 3–1.

| Game | Date | Score | Location | Time | Attendance |
|---|---|---|---|---|---|
| 1 | October 4 | Atlanta Braves – 0, Los Angeles Dodgers – 6 | Dodger Stadium | 3:13 | 50,947 |
| 2 | October 5 | Atlanta Braves – 0, Los Angeles Dodgers – 3 | Dodger Stadium | 2:35 | 54,452 |
| 3 | October 7 | Los Angeles Dodgers – 5, Atlanta Braves – 6 | SunTrust Park | 3:36 | 42,385 |
| 4 | October 8 | Los Angeles Dodgers – 6 Atlanta Braves – 2 | SunTrust Park | 3:42 | 39,586 |

== Milwaukee vs. Colorado ==
This was the first postseason meeting between the Brewers and Rockies. It is also the first and only postseason meeting to pit one team who won a tie-breaker game (Brewers) and one team who lost a tie-breaker game (Rockies).

=== Game 1 ===
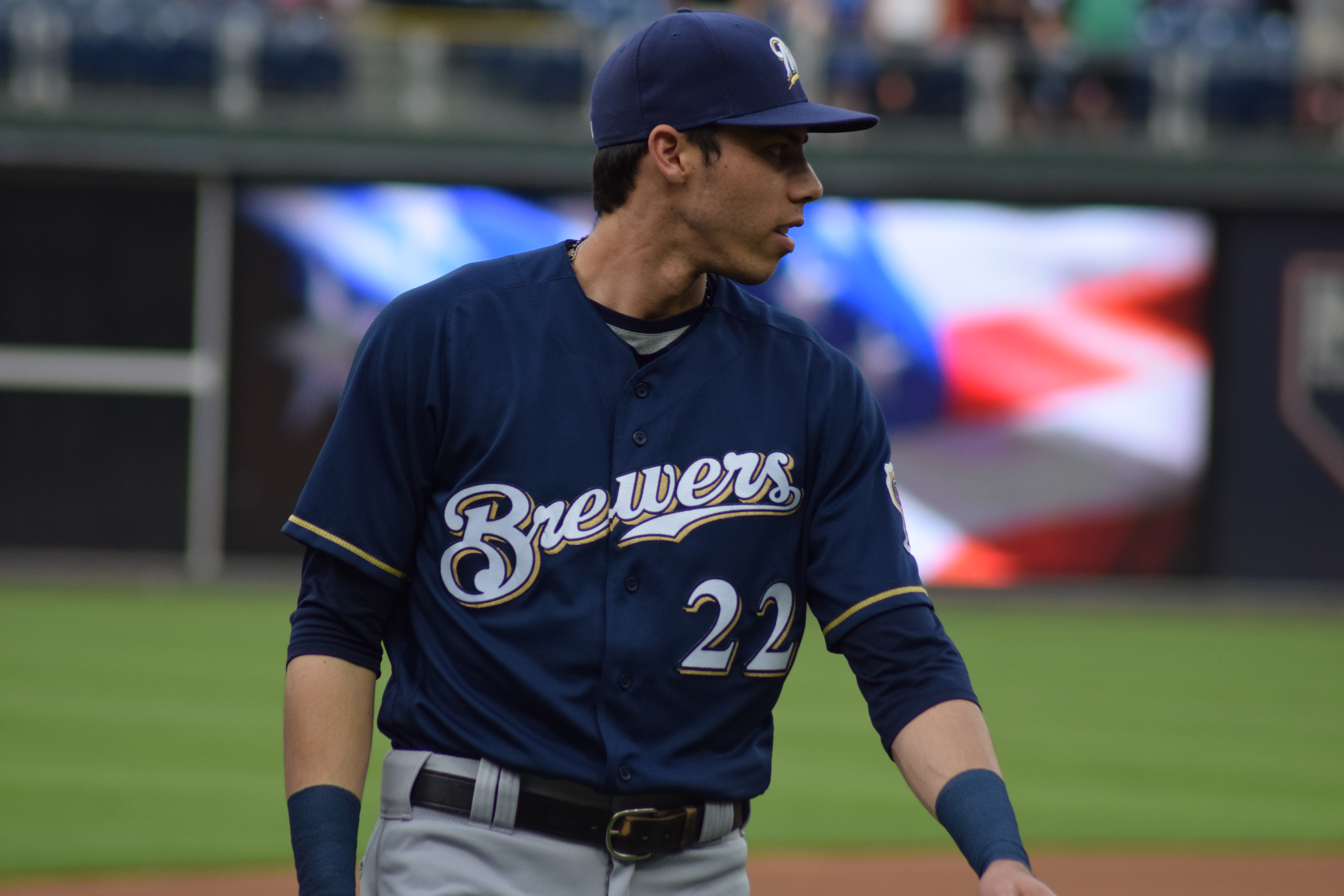
Christian Yelich went 2-for-3 including the only home run in Game 1.

October 4, 2018 4:07 pm (CDT) at Miller Park in Milwaukee, Wisconsin, 69 °F (21 °C), roof closed
| Team | 1 | 2 | 3 | 4 | 5 | 6 | 7 | 8 | 9 | 10 | R | H | E |
|---|---|---|---|---|---|---|---|---|---|---|---|---|---|
| Colorado | 0 | 0 | 0 | 0 | 0 | 0 | 0 | 0 | 2 | 0 | 2 | 4 | 0 |
| Milwaukee | 0 | 0 | 2 | 0 | 0 | 0 | 0 | 0 | 0 | 1 | 3 | 7 | 1 |
WP: Joakim Soria (1–0) LP: Adam Ottavino (0–1); Home runs: COL: None; MIL: Christian Yelich (1); Attendance: 43,382; Boxscore

The Brewers took the lead in the bottom of the third inning, on a two-run home run by Christian Yelich off of Rockies starting pitcher Antonio Senzatela. The Rockies tied it in the top of the ninth, getting two runs off of Brewers closer Jeremy Jeffress via three singles, an error, and a sacrifice fly. The two runs the Rockies scored in the top of the 9th inning would turn out to be the only runs and the only inning they would score in during the entire series. Milwaukee won the game in the bottom of the tenth, when Mike Moustakas hit a two-out walk-off single off of Adam Ottavino with runners on first and third. Brewers reliever Joakim Soria, who had retired the Rockies in order in the top of the tenth, got the win.

=== Game 2 ===
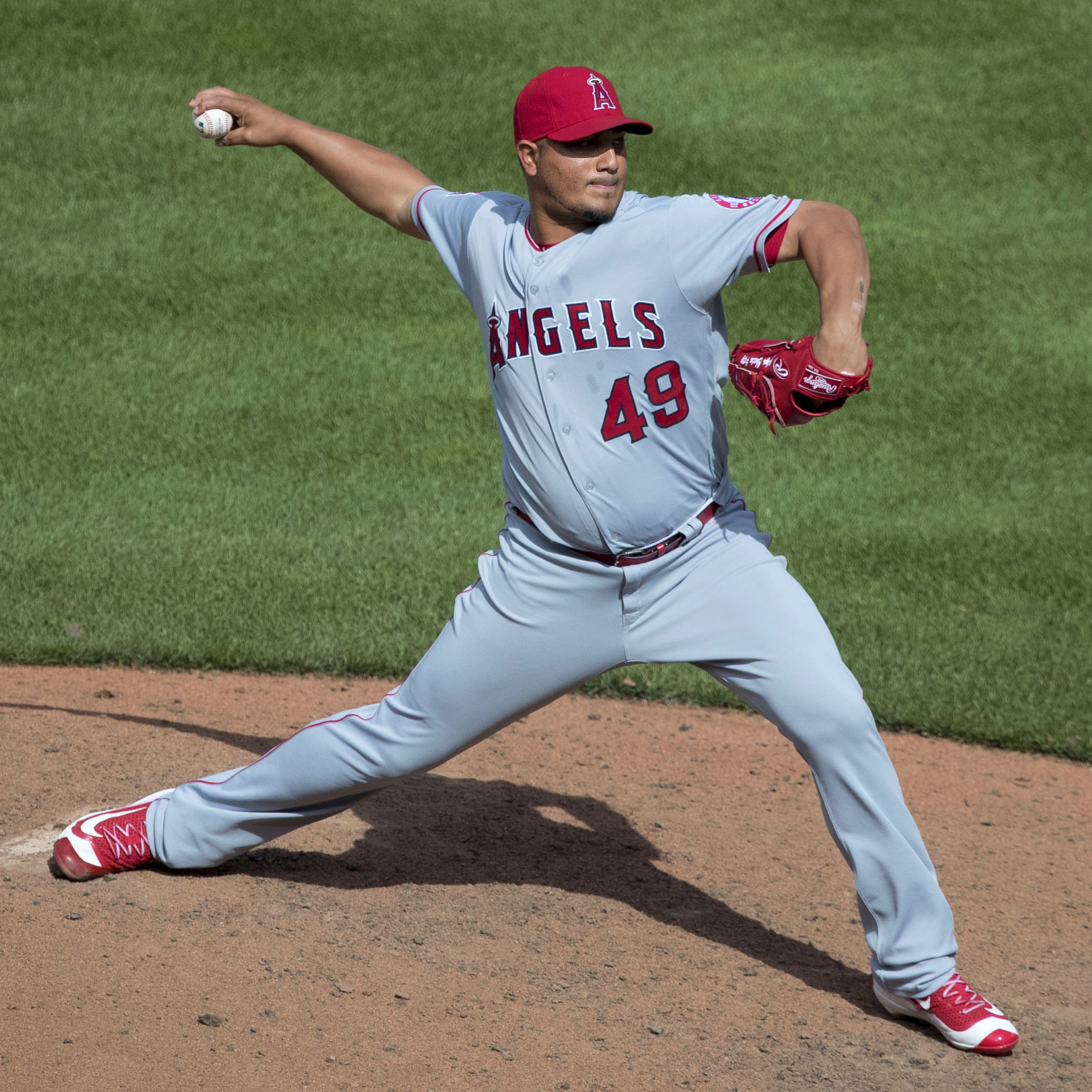
Brewers starter Jhoulys Chacín, shown here with the Angels in 2016, got the win in Game 2.

October 5, 2018 3:15 pm (CDT) at Miller Park in Milwaukee, Wisconsin, 69 °F (21 °C), roof closed
| Team | 1 | 2 | 3 | 4 | 5 | 6 | 7 | 8 | 9 | R | H | E |
|---|---|---|---|---|---|---|---|---|---|---|---|---|
| Colorado | 0 | 0 | 0 | 0 | 0 | 0 | 0 | 0 | 0 | 0 | 5 | 0 |
| Milwaukee | 0 | 0 | 0 | 1 | 0 | 0 | 0 | 3 | X | 4 | 9 | 1 |
WP: Jhoulys Chacín (1–0) LP: Tyler Anderson (0–1) Sv: Jeremy Jeffress (1); Attendance: 44,547; Boxscore

After three scoreless innings, Milwaukee took the lead in the bottom of the fourth, on back-to-back doubles by Mike Moustakas and Hernán Pérez. The lead was extended to 4–0 in the eighth, with three runs coming off a total of two walks and three singles. Brewers starter Jhoulys Chacín got the win after allowing three hits in five innings while striking out three and walking three; closer Jeremy Jeffress earned the save, pitching the eighth and ninth while allowing two hits and striking out three. Rockies starter Tyler Anderson allowed one run on four hits in six innings of work, and took the loss.

=== Game 3 ===
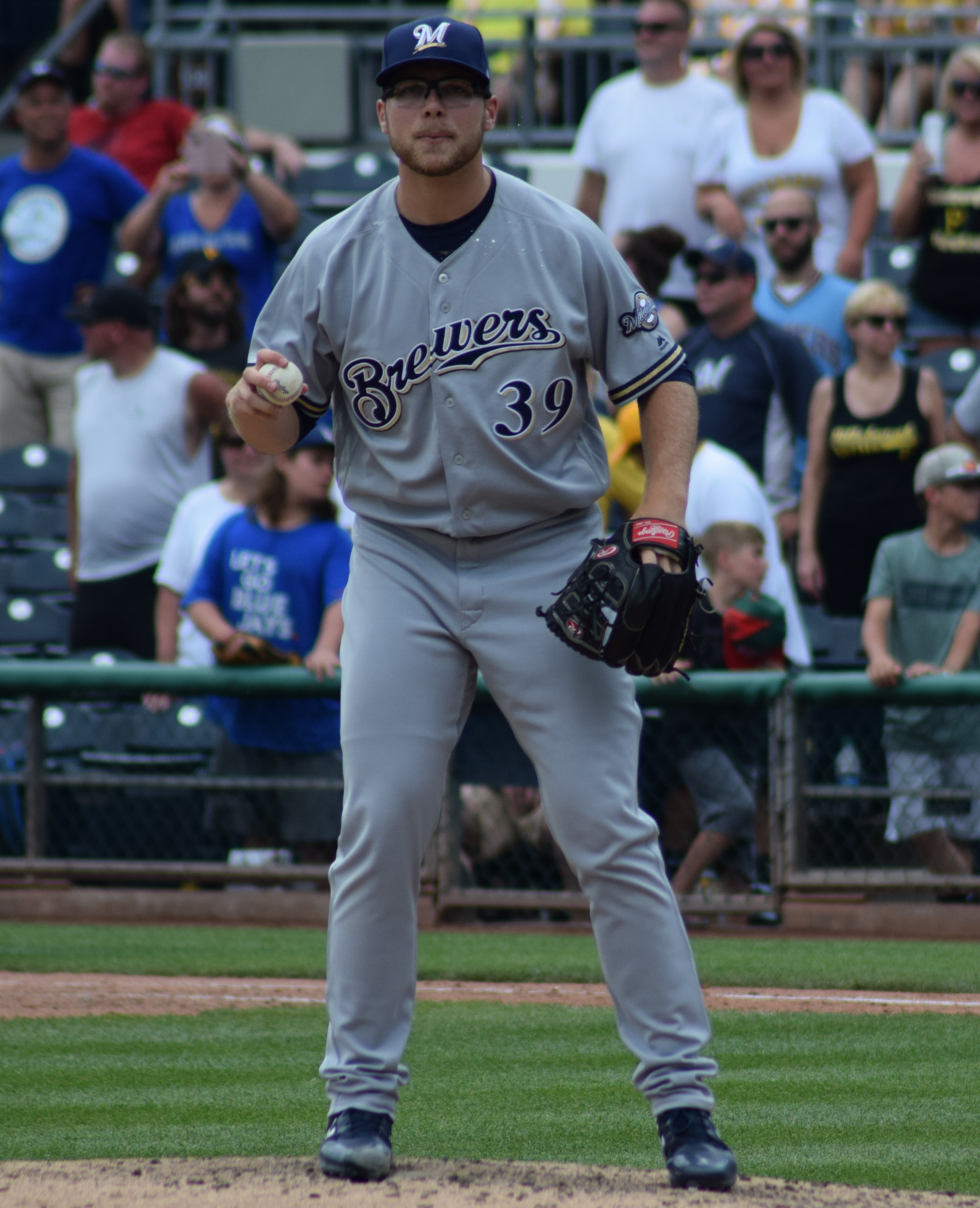
Milwaukee reliever Corbin Burnes got the win in Game 3.

October 7, 2018 2:37 pm (MDT) at Coors Field in Denver, Colorado, 46 °F (8 °C), cloudy
| Team | 1 | 2 | 3 | 4 | 5 | 6 | 7 | 8 | 9 | R | H | E |
|---|---|---|---|---|---|---|---|---|---|---|---|---|
| Milwaukee | 1 | 0 | 0 | 1 | 0 | 2 | 0 | 0 | 2 | 6 | 12 | 0 |
| Colorado | 0 | 0 | 0 | 0 | 0 | 0 | 0 | 0 | 0 | 0 | 3 | 0 |
WP: Corbin Burnes (1–0) LP: Germán Márquez (0–1); Home runs: MIL: Jesús Aguilar (1), Orlando Arcia (1), Keon Broxton (1); COL: None; Attendance: 49,658; Boxscore

The Brewers opened the game with a run in the top of the first inning, coming on a walk, single, and fielder's choice, with Christian Yelich scoring for the 1–0 lead. A Jesús Aguilar home run in the top of the fourth inning gave Milwaukee a 2–0 lead. The Brewers doubled their lead to 4–0 in the top of the sixth inning; with runners on second and third with two outs, Rockies reliever Scott Oberg gave up one run via balk and another via a wild pitch. Home runs by Orlando Arcia and Keon Broxton in the top of the ninth inning increased the lead to 6–0. In the bottom of the ninth, the Rockies got two men on base with one out, before Milwaukee reliever Josh Hader came in and recorded the final two outs, completing the sweep. Brewers pitcher Corbin Burnes got the win after pitching two innings of no-hit relief, while Rockies starter Germán Márquez allowed seven hits and two runs in five innings and took the loss. The Brewers' 12 2/3 innings from starters were the fewest ever for a team that won a Division Series. The Brewers went on to play the Dodgers in the NLCS.

=== Composite line score ===
2018 NLDS (3–0): Milwaukee Brewers defeated Colorado Rockies.

| Team | 1 | 2 | 3 | 4 | 5 | 6 | 7 | 8 | 9 | 10 | R | H | E |
|---|---|---|---|---|---|---|---|---|---|---|---|---|---|
| Colorado Rockies | 0 | 0 | 0 | 0 | 0 | 0 | 0 | 0 | 2 | 0 | 2 | 12 | 0 |
| Milwaukee Brewers | 1 | 0 | 2 | 2 | 0 | 2 | 0 | 3 | 2 | 1 | 13 | 28 | 2 |
Total attendance: 137,587 Average attendance: 45,862

== Los Angeles vs. Atlanta ==
This was the third postseason meeting between the Dodgers and Braves. The previous two match-ups were the 1996 National League Division Series and 2013 National League Division Series. They also met in the 1959 National League tie-breaker series. The Braves formerly were an NL West member for 24 years (1969–1993); the Braves and Dodgers finished in the top two positions in the division in 1982, 1983, and 1991, all of which came down to the final week of the season.

=== Game 1 ===
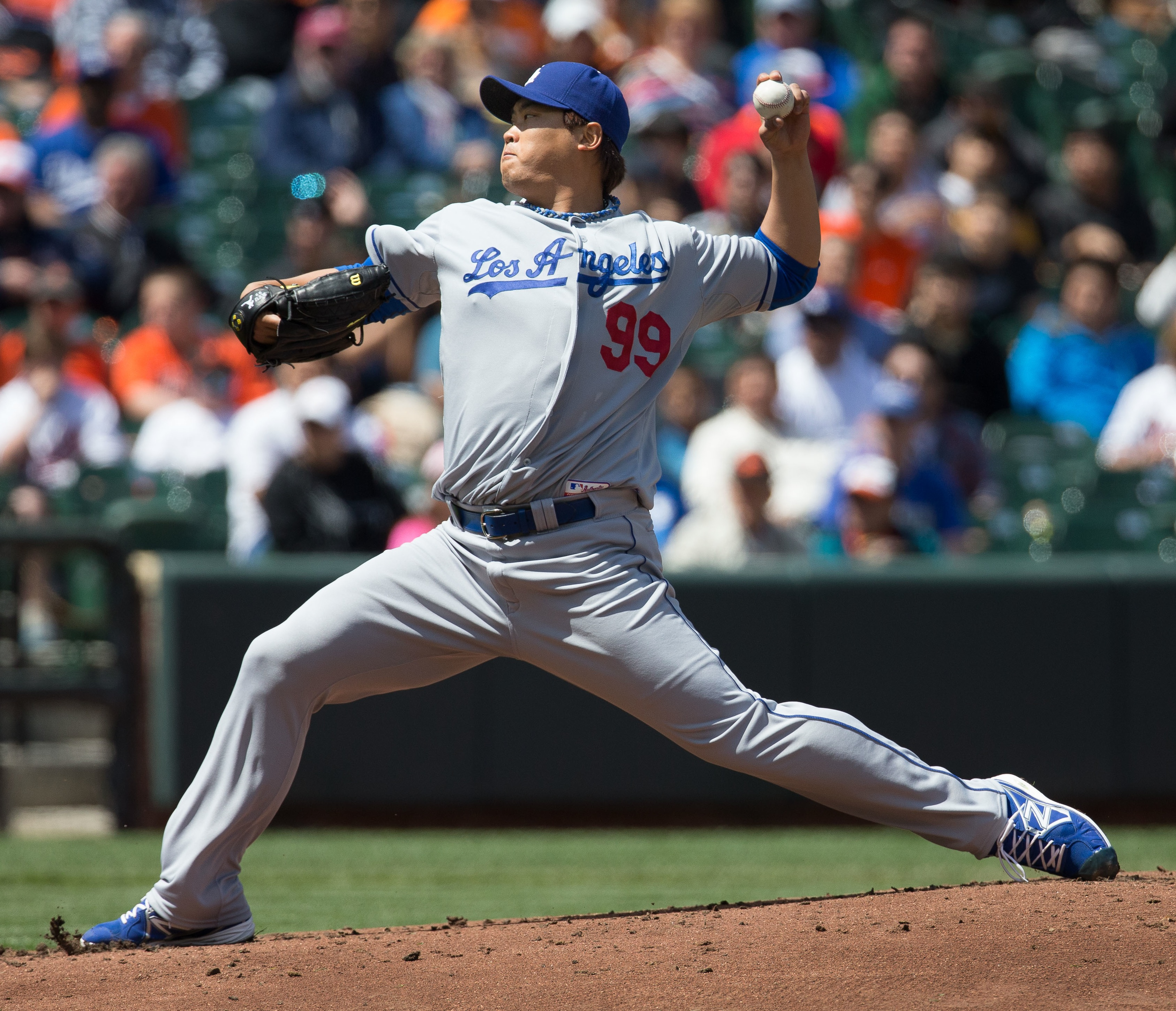
Dodgers' starting pitcher Hyun-jin Ryu got the win in Game 1.

October 4, 2018 5:38 pm (PDT) at Dodger Stadium in Los Angeles, California, 72 °F (22 °C), partly cloudy
| Team | 1 | 2 | 3 | 4 | 5 | 6 | 7 | 8 | 9 | R | H | E |
|---|---|---|---|---|---|---|---|---|---|---|---|---|
| Atlanta | 0 | 0 | 0 | 0 | 0 | 0 | 0 | 0 | 0 | 0 | 6 | 1 |
| Los Angeles | 1 | 3 | 0 | 0 | 0 | 1 | 0 | 1 | X | 6 | 5 | 1 |
WP: Hyun-jin Ryu (1–0) LP: Mike Foltynewicz (0–1); Home runs: ATL: None; LAD: Joc Pederson (1), Max Muncy (1), Kiké Hernández (1); Attendance: 50,947; Boxscore

Hyun-jin Ryu started the game for the Dodgers and Mike Foltynewicz for the Braves. Joc Pederson hit Foltynewicz's third pitch of the game for a home run, his 10th leadoff homer of the season, to start the scoring. In the second inning, Max Muncy hit a three-run home run to put the Dodgers up, 4–0. Muncy became just the eighth player to hit a home run and walk three times in a playoff game. Foltynewicz only lasted two innings, allowing four runs on four hits, three walks and one hit batter. He also struck out five. Ryu pitched seven innings, struck eight batters, and did not allow a run or walk. It was his second career postseason start of seven scoreless innings. The only other Dodgers to do it multiple times were Sandy Koufax, Jerry Reuss and Orel Hershiser. Kiké Hernández added a homer in the sixth inning and the Dodgers scored one more run in the eighth on a sacrifice fly to win game one of the series, 6–0.

=== Game 2 ===
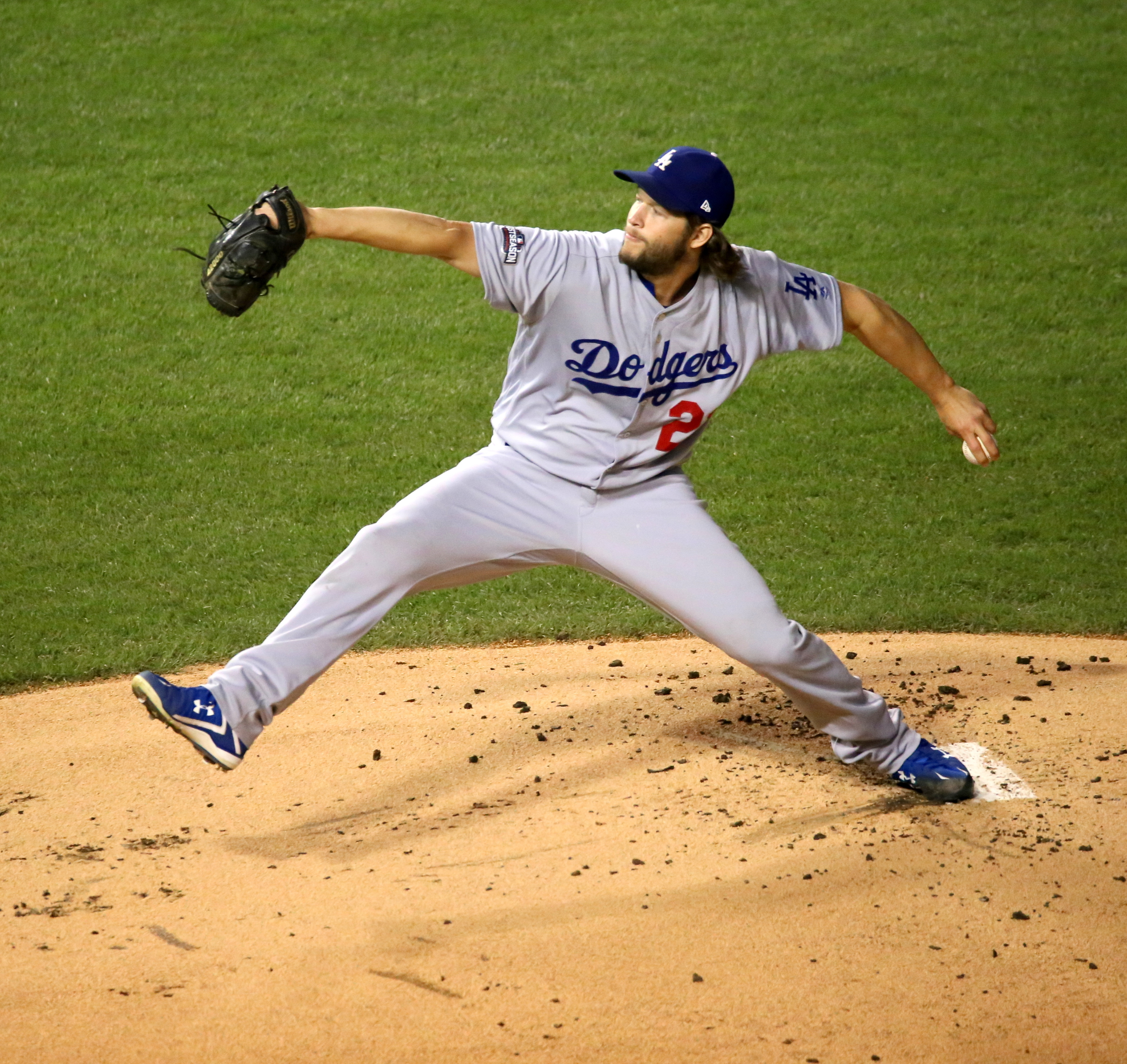
Clayton Kershaw got the win in Game 2, allowing just two hits in eight innings.

October 5, 2018 6:38 pm (PDT) at Dodger Stadium in Los Angeles, California, 71 °F (22 °C), partly cloudy
| Team | 1 | 2 | 3 | 4 | 5 | 6 | 7 | 8 | 9 | R | H | E |
|---|---|---|---|---|---|---|---|---|---|---|---|---|
| Atlanta | 0 | 0 | 0 | 0 | 0 | 0 | 0 | 0 | 0 | 0 | 3 | 0 |
| Los Angeles | 2 | 0 | 0 | 0 | 1 | 0 | 0 | 0 | X | 3 | 5 | 0 |
WP: Clayton Kershaw (1–0) LP: Aníbal Sánchez (0–1) Sv: Kenley Jansen (1); Home runs: ATL: None; LAD: Manny Machado (1), Yasmani Grandal (1); Attendance: 54,452; Boxscore

Clayton Kershaw started the game for the Dodgers, allowing only two hits in eight innings. The Dodgers established an early lead via a two-run homer by Manny Machado in the bottom of the first inning and added another run on a homer by Yasmani Grandal in the fifth, both off of Braves starter Aníbal Sánchez, who lasted 4 2/3 innings. Kenley Jansen closed out the Braves in the ninth for the save. Los Angeles became just the second team in postseason history to open a postseason run with two shutouts, joining the 1921 Yankees. Consequently, Atlanta became just the second team in postseason history to open a postseason run by being shut out in two straight games, joining the 1921 Giants.

=== Game 3 ===
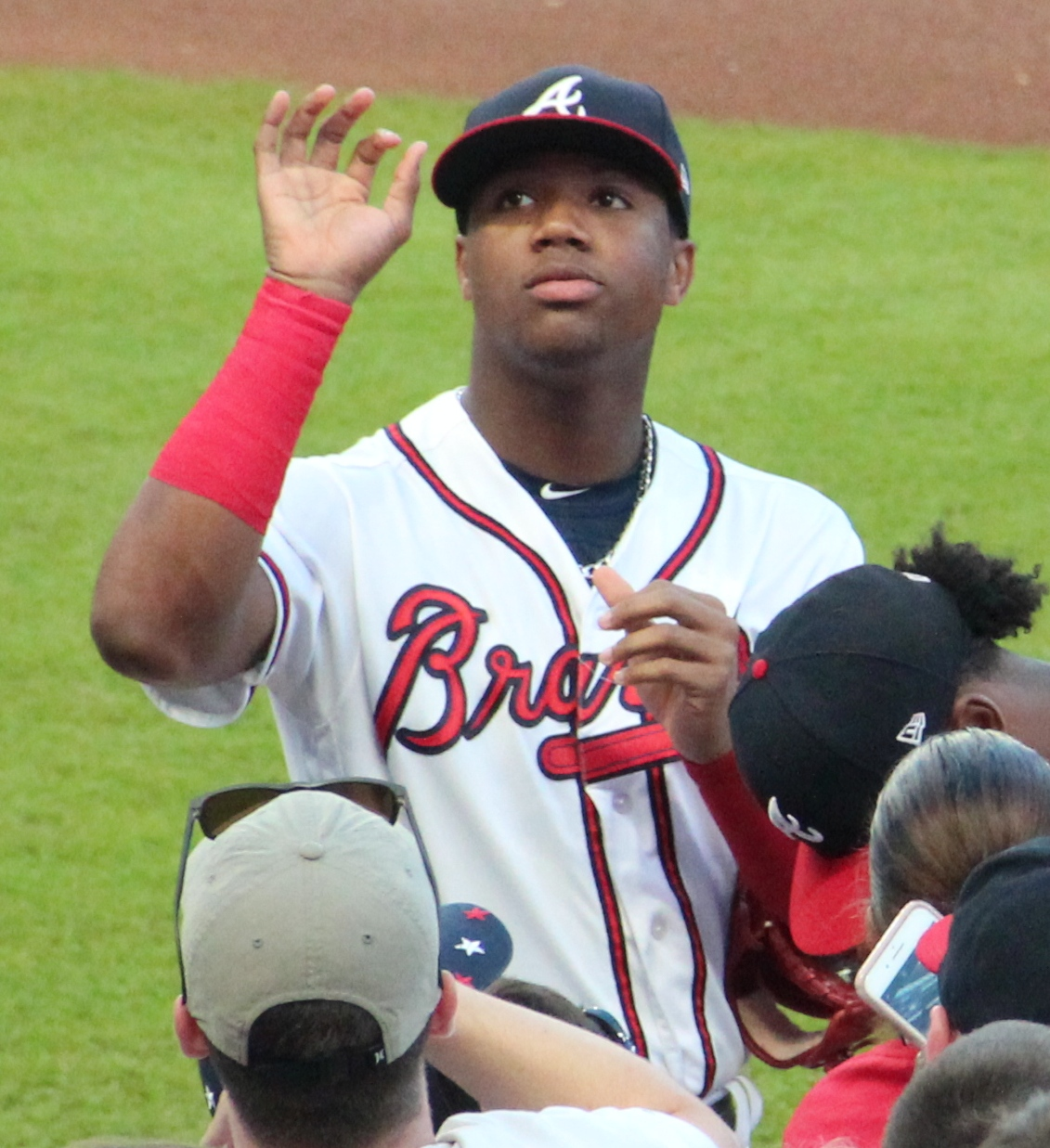
In Game 3, Ronald Acuña Jr. became the youngest player in MLB history to hit a postseason grand slam.

October 7, 2018 8:08 pm (EDT) at SunTrust Park in Cumberland, Georgia, 77 °F (25 °C), partly cloudy
| Team | 1 | 2 | 3 | 4 | 5 | 6 | 7 | 8 | 9 | R | H | E |
|---|---|---|---|---|---|---|---|---|---|---|---|---|
| Los Angeles | 0 | 0 | 2 | 0 | 3 | 0 | 0 | 0 | 0 | 5 | 7 | 1 |
| Atlanta | 0 | 5 | 0 | 0 | 0 | 1 | 0 | 0 | X | 6 | 4 | 1 |
WP: Touki Toussaint (1–0) LP: Alex Wood (0–1) Sv: Arodys Vizcaíno (1); Home runs: LAD: Chris Taylor (1), Max Muncy (2); ATL: Ronald Acuña Jr. (1), Freddie Freeman (1); Attendance: 42,385; Boxscore

Walker Buehler started for the Dodgers, while Sean Newcomb started for the Braves. Atlanta took a 5–0 lead in the bottom of the second inning. The first run came when Newcomb forced a run with a bases-loaded walk, the first time in postseason history a pitcher has done this. Four more runs were scored on a grand slam by Ronald Acuña Jr. Acuña (20 years, 293 days old) became the youngest player to hit a grand slam in post-season history, surpassing Mickey Mantle (who was 21 years, 349 days old in the 1953 World Series). Los Angeles got back two runs in the top of the third, on an RBI single by Justin Turner with the second run scoring on error by Acuña. Newcomb was replaced after allowing two runs (one earned) in 2 2/3 innings. Chris Taylor hit a two-run home run in the fifth off of Kevin Gausman to cut the lead to one run and then Max Muncy tied the game with a homer off Max Fried. After the second inning, Buehler settled down and pitched five innings with only two hits and seven strikeouts. He also walked two and allowed the five runs. The Braves recaptured the lead when Freddie Freeman homered off Alex Wood in the sixth inning. The Dodgers got a couple of baserunners on in the ninth but Arodys Vizcaíno managed to close out the win for the Braves, 6–5, extending their season. The game's attendance of 42,385 was the largest yet at the two-season old SunTrust Park.

=== Game 4 ===
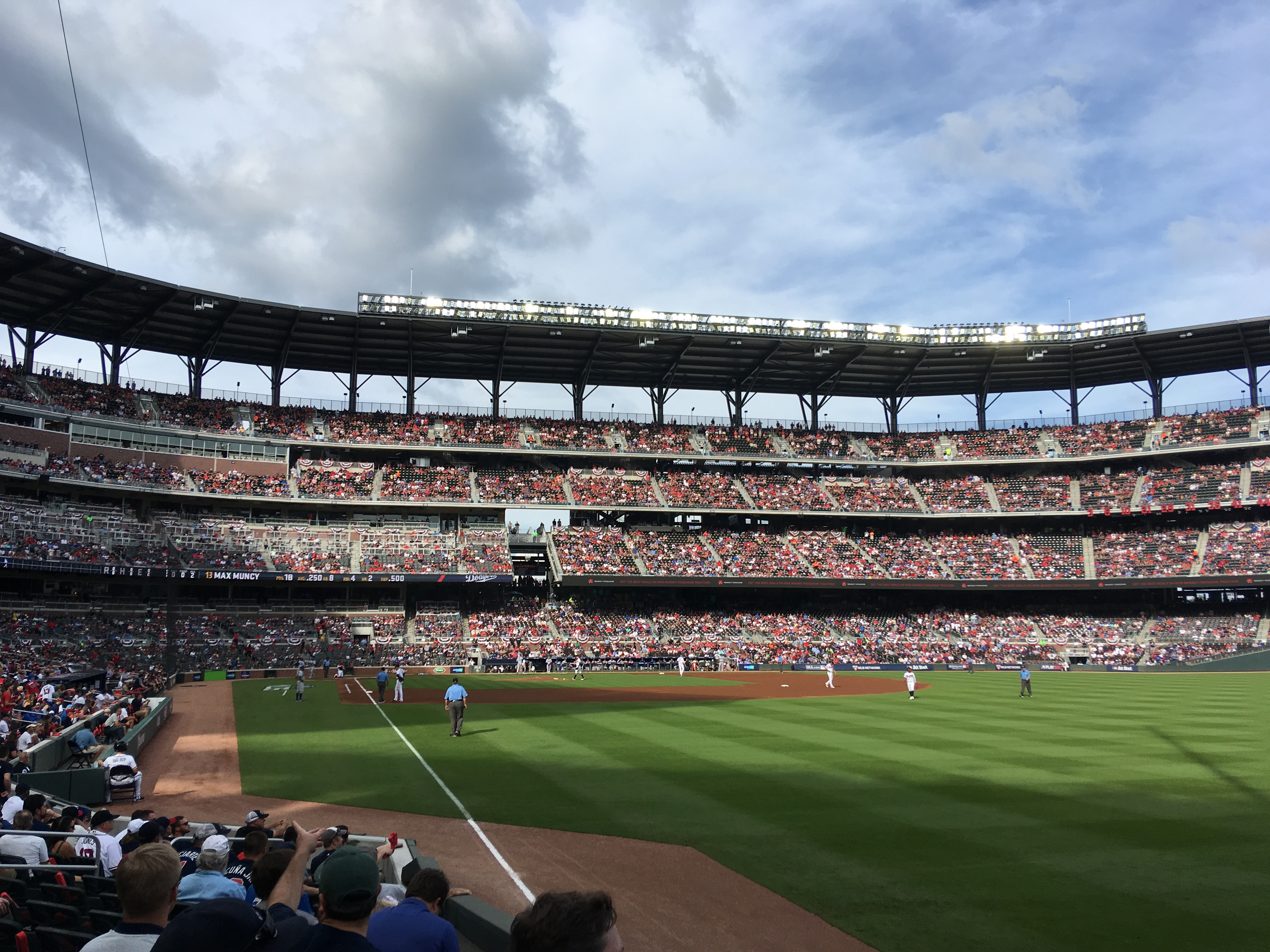
SunTrust Park during Game 4 of the 2018 NLDS

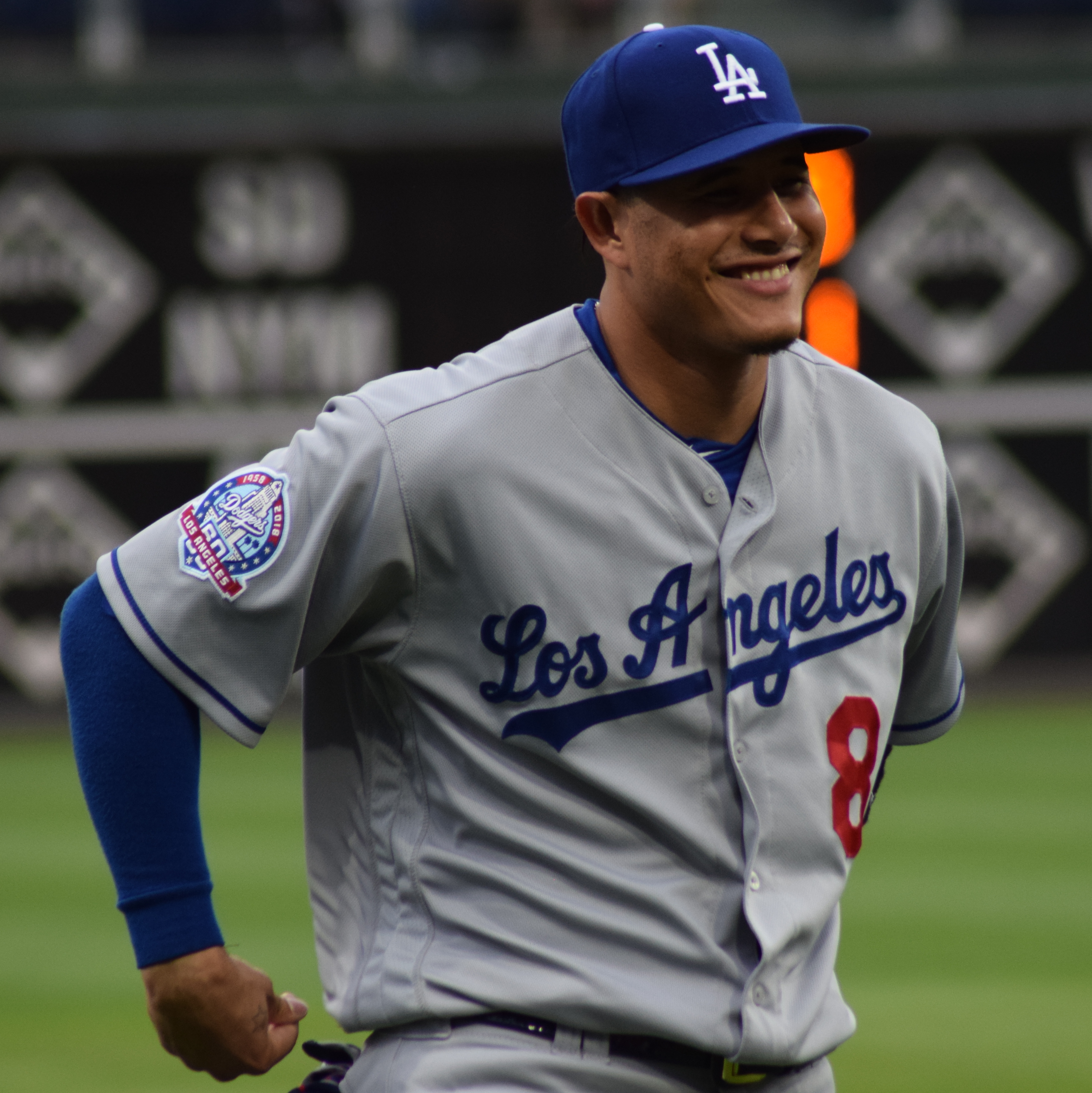
Manny Machado had two hits and four RBIs in Game 4.

October 8, 2018 4:33 pm (EDT) at SunTrust Park in Cumberland, Georgia, 82 °F (28 °C), cloudy
| Team | 1 | 2 | 3 | 4 | 5 | 6 | 7 | 8 | 9 | R | H | E |
|---|---|---|---|---|---|---|---|---|---|---|---|---|
| Los Angeles | 1 | 0 | 0 | 0 | 0 | 2 | 3 | 0 | 0 | 6 | 8 | 1 |
| Atlanta | 0 | 0 | 0 | 2 | 0 | 0 | 0 | 0 | 0 | 2 | 6 | 0 |
WP: Ryan Madson (1–0) LP: Jonny Venters (0–1); Home runs: LAD: Manny Machado (2); ATL: None; Attendance: 39,586; Boxscore

Mike Foltynewicz made his second start of the series for the Braves, after his abbreviated start in Game 1, while Rich Hill made his first start of the post-season for the Dodgers. An RBI double by Manny Machado in the first inning gave the Dodgers an early lead. A two RBI pinch hit single by Kurt Suzuki in the fourth inning put the Braves ahead by a run. Foltynewicz was removed after four innings, where he struck out five and only allowed two hits, four walks and one run. Hill pitched 4 1/3 innings, with three strikeouts, and allowed four hits while walking five. A pinch-hit two RBI single by David Freese off Brad Brach put the Dodgers back ahead in the sixth inning. A three-run home run by Machado in the seventh inning off of Chad Sobotka extended the lead to 6–2. The Dodgers bullpen held on and they won the game and the series, advancing to their third straight National League Championship Series.

=== Composite line score ===
2018 NLDS (3–1): Los Angeles Dodgers defeated Atlanta Braves.

| Team | 1 | 2 | 3 | 4 | 5 | 6 | 7 | 8 | 9 | R | H | E |
|---|---|---|---|---|---|---|---|---|---|---|---|---|
| Atlanta Braves | 0 | 5 | 0 | 2 | 0 | 1 | 0 | 0 | 0 | 8 | 19 | 2 |
| Los Angeles Dodgers | 4 | 3 | 2 | 0 | 4 | 3 | 3 | 1 | 0 | 20 | 24 | 3 |
Total attendance: 187,370 Average attendance: 46,843

== See also ==
- 2018 American League Division Series
