= 2018 National League West tie-breaker game =

2018 Major League Baseball tie-breaker game

	1	2	3	4	5	6	7	8	9	R	H	E
Colorado Rockies	0	0	0	0	0	0	0	0	2	2	4	0
Los Angeles Dodgers	0	0	0	2	2	1	0	0	x	5	9	0
- Date: October 1, 2018
- Venue: Dodger Stadium
- City: Los Angeles, California
- Umpires: HP: Bill Welke; 1B: Brian Gorman; 2B: Jerry Meals; 3B: Marvin Hudson; LF: David Rackley; RF: Quinn Wolcott
- Attendance: 47,816
- Television: ESPN
- TV announcers: Jon Sciambi, David Ross, and Rick Sutcliffe
- Radio: ESPN
- Radio announcers: Adam Amin and Jim Bowden

The 2018 National League West tie-breaker game was a one-game extension to Major League Baseball's (MLB) 2018 regular season, played between the Colorado Rockies and Los Angeles Dodgers to determine the champion of the National League's (NL) West Division. It was played at Dodger Stadium in Los Angeles, California on October 1, 2018.

The game was won by Los Angeles, 5–2. The Dodgers became the second seed in the NL playoffs and advanced to play the NL East champion Atlanta Braves in the National League Division Series. The Rockies were hosted by the NL Central runner-up Chicago Cubs in the NL Wild Card Game on October 2.

The tie-breaker counted as a regular season game for both teams, with all events in the game added to regular season statistics.

== Background ==
The Los Angeles Dodgers entered the 2018 Major League Baseball season having won the last five consecutive National League West Division championships. The Colorado Rockies made the Major League Baseball postseason in 2017 as a wild card. Despite this being their fifth postseason appearance, the Rockies had not won a division title.

Both the Dodgers and Rockies finished the 2018 regular season with 91–71 (.562) win–loss records, necessitating a tie-breaking game to determine the division champion. As the Chicago Cubs and Milwaukee Brewers tied for first place in the National League Central Division, they also played in a tie-breaker game, marking the first time in Major League Baseball that two tie-breakers were needed in a single year.

== Game summary ==
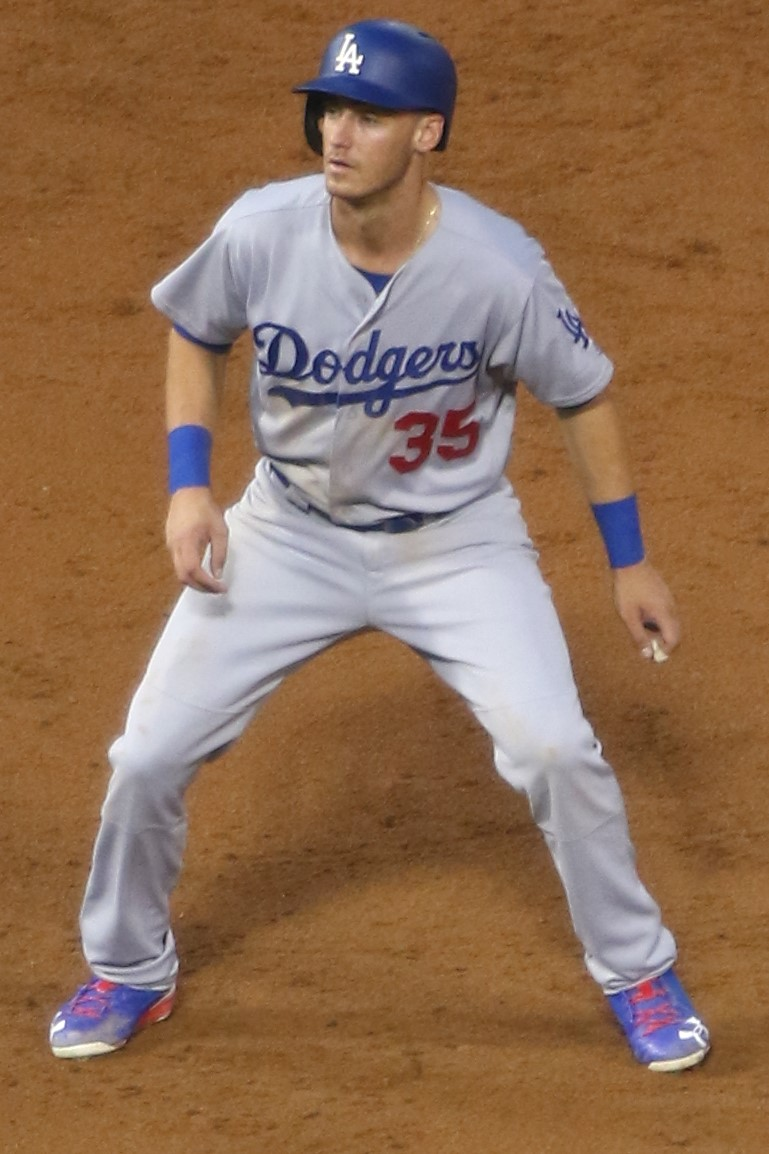
Cody Bellinger hit a two-run home run for Los Angeles.

October 1, 2018, 1:08 pm (PDT) at Dodger Stadium in Los Angeles, California, 90 °F (32 °C), sunny
Team	1	2	3	4	5	6	7	8	9	R	H	E
Colorado	0	0	0	0	0	0	0	0	2	2	4	0
Los Angeles	0	0	0	2	2	1	0	0	X	5	9	0
WP: Walker Buehler (8–5) LP: Germán Márquez (14–11); Home runs: COL: Nolan Arenado (38), Trevor Story (37); LAD: Cody Bellinger (25), Max Muncy (35); Attendance: 47,816; Boxscore

The Dodgers hosted the tie-breaker game based on their head-to-head record against the Rockies in the regular season. Germán Márquez started for Colorado and Walker Buehler started for Los Angeles. ESPN broadcast the game, with Jon Sciambi, David Ross, and Rick Sutcliffe. They also carried the game on ESPN Radio, with Adam Amin and Jim Bowden.

The Dodgers got two-run home runs from Cody Bellinger in the fourth inning and Max Muncy in the fifth inning off of Márquez, who struck out nine in 4 2/3 innings. Meanwhile, Buehler did not allow a hit in his first five innings, and allowed one hit in 6 2/3 total innings. The Rockies got solo homers in the ninth inning from Nolan Arenado and Trevor Story off of Kenley Jansen. However, they ended the game with only four hits. The Dodgers won the game 5–2 to clinch their sixth consecutive division championship. They became the first team to win six straight division championships since the New York Yankees won 11 straight from 1996–2006 and only the third overall (the Atlanta Braves won 14 from 1991–2005).

== Aftermath ==
With the victory, the Dodgers clinched the second seed in the NL postseason. They beat the Atlanta Braves in the NLDS in four games. The Dodgers defeated the Brewers in the NLCS in seven games, and moved onto the World Series, where they lost in five games to the Boston Red Sox.

With the loss, the Rockies were relegated to the second Wild Card spot. The Rockies defeated the Chicago Cubs in the 2018 National League Wild Card Game the next day, but were then swept by the Brewers in the NLDS.

This game, along with the NL Central tie-breaker game, were the last such tie-breaker games in Major League Baseball, as the league eliminated this scenario starting with the 2022 season. All ties in the standings would be broken through various formulas.
