= 2018 National League Central tie-breaker game =

2018 Major League Baseball tie-breaker game

	1	2	3	4	5	6	7	8	9	R	H	E
Milwaukee Brewers	0	0	1	0	0	0	0	2	0	3	12	0
Chicago Cubs	0	0	0	0	1	0	0	0	0	1	3	0
- Date: October 1, 2018
- Venue: Wrigley Field
- City: Chicago, Illinois
- Umpires: HP: Fieldin Culbreth; 1B: Jeff Nelson; 2B: Jim Reynolds; 3B: Chad Fairchild; LF: D. J. Reyburn; RF: Adam Hamari
- Attendance: 38,450
- Television: ESPN
- TV announcers: Karl Ravech, Eduardo Pérez, Tim Kurkjian, and Buster Olney
- Radio: ESPN
- Radio announcers: Jason Benetti and Chris Singleton

The 2018 National League Central tie-breaker game was a one-game extension to Major League Baseball's (MLB) 2018 regular season, played between the Milwaukee Brewers and Chicago Cubs to determine the champion of the National League's (NL) Central Division. It was played at Wrigley Field in Chicago, Illinois on October 1, 2018.

The Brewers won, 3–1, and became the top seed in the NL playoffs. The Cubs hosted the NL West runner-up Colorado Rockies in the NL Wild Card Game on October 2, with the Rockies winning 2–1 in 13 innings to advance to face the Brewers in the National League Division Series.

The Cubs and Brewers ended the 2018 season tied for the division lead and the NL's best win–loss record at 95–67 (.586), thereby guaranteeing that whoever lost would host the Wild Card Game the next day. The tie-breaker was counted as a regular season game for both teams, with all events in the game added to regular season statistics. October 1 also marked the first time two division tie-breakers had been played in a single season.

== Background ==
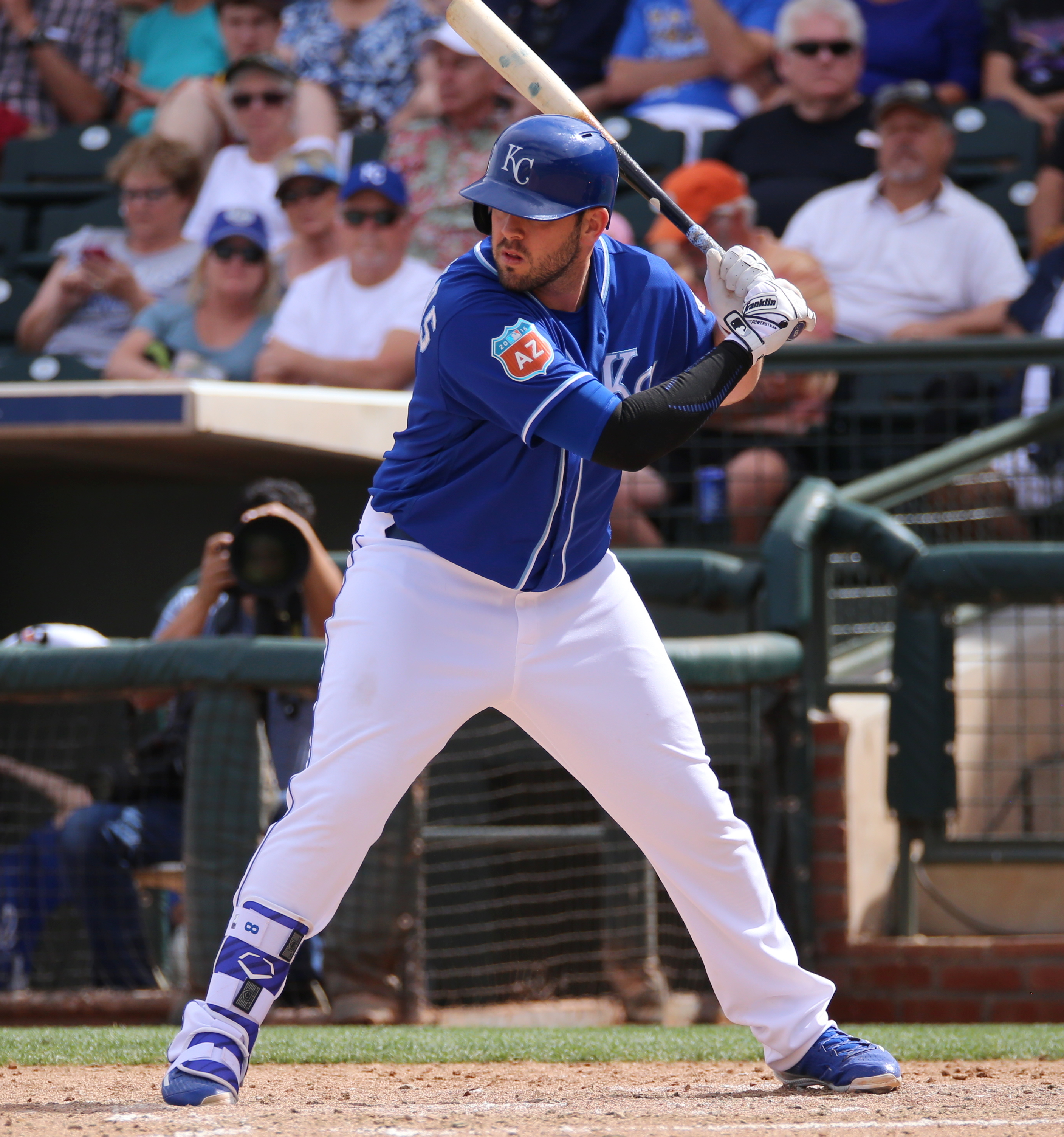
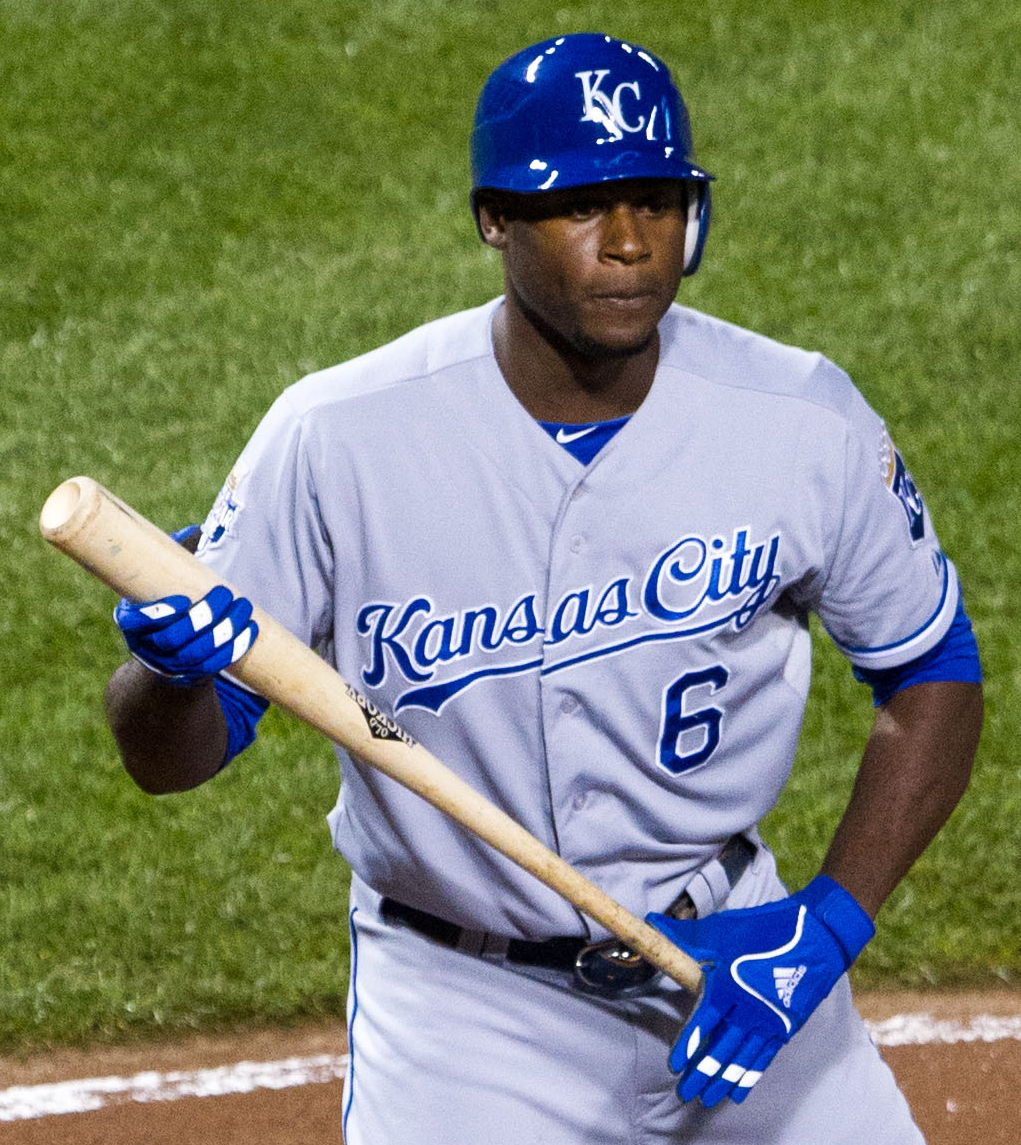
The Brewers' July 27 trade with Kansas City reunited former teammates and 2015 World Series champions Mike Moustakas (left) with Lorenzo Cain (right). Cain signed with Milwaukee as a free agent in the offseason. Both men hit singles in the tiebreaker.

Chicago had won two consecutive National League Central Division championships, and were expected to win a third-consecutive division title. The Milwaukee Brewers finished 2017 six games back of the Cubs, despite leading the 2017 division race by 5.5 games at the All-Star break. Milwaukee's last playoff appearance was its 2011 division title.

To challenge for the 2018 division, the Brewers made several key offseason acquisitions, among them starter Jhoulys Chacin, former Kansas City Royal Lorenzo Cain and then-Marlins outfielder Christian Yelich. The Cubs' high-profile offseason acquisitions, Yu Darvish and Brandon Morrow, were lost to injury during the season, and both missed the tie-breaker game.

Milwaukee emerged from a crowded early division race on May 18. Chicago took the division lead from the Brewers on July 14 and maintained sole possession of first place until falling to a third-place St. Louis club at home in the penultimate game of the season. Chicago had surged out of the All-Star break to a five-game lead over the Brewers lead on September 2, but Milwaukee put together a 19–7 September record that included four wins over the Cubs in nine days.

The Brewers ended the season on an 8-game win streak, while the Cubs won their final game 10–5 over the Cards to force the tiebreaker. The Cubs won the right to host the tie-breaker with an 11–8 head-to-head record against the Brewers.

== Game summary ==
October 1, 2018, 12:05 pm (CDT) at Wrigley Field in Chicago, Illinois, 65 °F (18 °C), overcast
Team	1	2	3	4	5	6	7	8	9	R	H	E
Milwaukee	0	0	1	0	0	0	0	2	0	3	12	0
Chicago	0	0	0	0	1	0	0	0	0	1	3	0
WP: Corey Knebel (4–3) LP: Justin Wilson (4–5) Sv: Josh Hader (12); Home runs: MIL: None; CHI: Anthony Rizzo (25); Attendance: 38,450; Boxscore

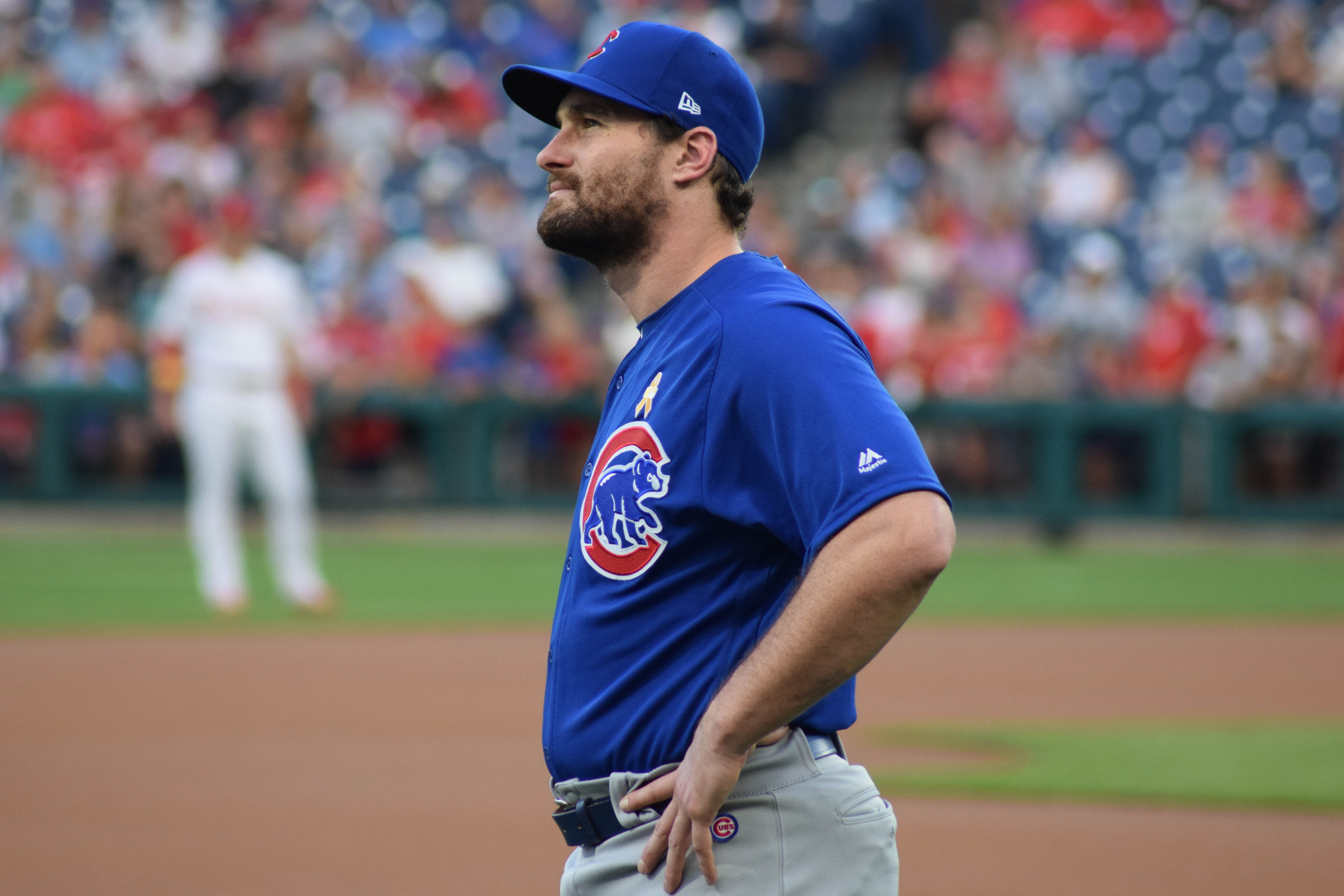
The Cubs acquired Nationals second baseman Daniel Murphy on August 31 in a waiver trade (Note: The following season, MLB eliminated the waiver trade, which had allowed teams to conduct trades after the July 31 deadline by first putting a player on a "trade waiver." Teams could then claim that player. The team with lowest record among those claiming the waivered player could then initiate a trade transaction. The so-called "waiver deadline" was Aug. 31.) Murphy logged one of three Cubs hits in the tiebreaker.

José Quintana started for Chicago, and Jhoulys Chacín started for Milwaukee. ESPN broadcast the game, with Karl Ravech, Eduardo Pérez, Tim Kurkjian, and Buster Olney. The game was also broadcast on ESPN Radio, with Jason Benetti and Chris Singleton.

Christian Yelich had a run batted in (RBI) single for the Brewers in the third inning. Anthony Rizzo of the Cubs tied the game with a home run in the fifth inning, the first hit the Cubs had off of Chacín. Lorenzo Cain and Ryan Braun of the Brewers added RBI singles in the eighth inning. Orlando Arcia had his first career four hit game and scored two of Milwaukee's runs.

== Aftermath ==
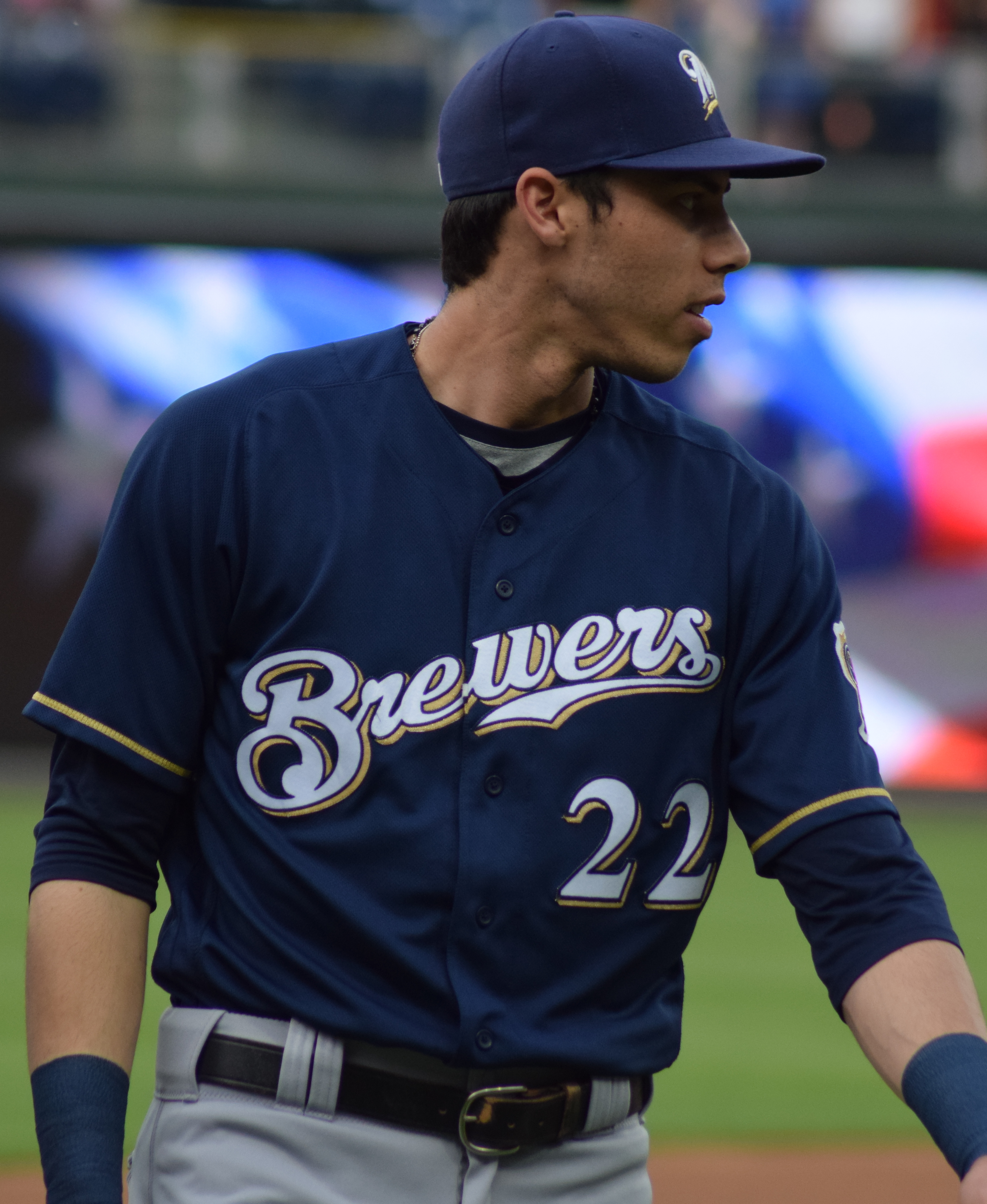
Christian Yelich would win the 2018 NL MVP over Cubs shortstop Javier Baez, who finished second in MVP voting.

With the win, the Brewers extended their regular-season win streak to 9 and qualified for home-field advantage throughout the NL playoffs. Finishing one loss behind the Brewers, the Cubs hosted the 2018 NL Wild Card Game and the NL West runner-up Rockies the following day. Colorado defeated the Cubs in 13 innings. It was Chicago's first opening-round exit since the Dodgers swept the Cubs in the 2008 NLDS. (Note: Major League Baseball changed its playoff format in 2012 from a four-team to a five-team format, adding a second Wild Card spot and each league's respective Wild Card play-in game. In 2008, the top-seeded Cubs hosted the lowest seeded division champion, the Dodgers (the NL West champions) instead of the Brewers due to the Brewers being the wild card team, and the previously used restriction of teams from the same division meeting in the Division Series, in the 2008 NLDS.)

Milwaukee swept the Rockies in the NLDS, but their win streak ended at 14 in the NLCS when the Dodgers beat Milwaukee 4–3 on October 13, the Brewers' first loss in 27 days. L.A. would win the NL pennant at Miller Park in seven games.

Yelich won the NL MVP over Baez, who finished in second. Both men won Silver Slugger awards and finished as Gold Glove runners up at their respective positions. Rizzo, Cain, Brewers third baseman Travis Shaw and Cubs right fielder Jason Heyward were also Gold Glove runners up. Brewers manager Craig Counsell would finish second in NL Manager of the Year voting, losing to Atlanta Braves manager Brian Snitker.

This game, along with the NL West tie-breaker game, were the last such tie-breaker games in Major League Baseball, as the league eliminated this scenario starting with the 2022 season. All ties in the standings would be broken through various formulas.

The Brewers later defeated the Cubs in the 2025 National League Division Series, which was the first official postseason meeting between the two rivals.
