= 2018 Colorado Rockies season =

2018 Colorado Rockies
- National League Wild Card winners
- League: National League
- Division: West
- Ballpark: Coors Field
- City: Denver, Colorado
- Record: 91–72 (.558)
- Divisional place: 2nd
- Owners: Charles & Richard Monfort
- General manager: Jeff Bridich
- Manager: Bud Black
- Television: AT&T Sportsnet Rocky Mountain (Drew Goodman, Jeff Huson, Ryan Spilborghs)
- Radio: KOA (English); Colorado Rockies Radio Network (Jack Corrigan, Jerry Schemmel); KNRV (Spanish) (Salvador Hernandez, Javier Olivas, Carlos Valdez)
- Stats: ESPN.com; Baseball Reference

The 2018 Colorado Rockies season was the franchise's 26th in Major League Baseball and the 24th season the Rockies played their home games at Coors Field. Bud Black returned for his second consecutive season as manager. They won 91 games during the regular season, which was the second-highest mark in franchise history and just one win behind the franchise record set in 2009. They finished the season with a record of 91–72 after losing to the Los Angeles Dodgers in the NL West tie-breaker and subsequently opened the postseason by defeating the Chicago Cubs in the NLWC Game. Their season ended when they were swept by the Milwaukee Brewers in the NLDS.

The Rockies became the first team since the 1922 Philadelphia Phillies to play in four cities against four teams in five days, including the 162nd game of the regular season, NL West tie-breaker, NLWC Game and NLDS Game 1. They also finished with the best road record in franchise history, going 44-38 away from Coors Field. This remains the Rockies last winning season and playoff appearance as of 2026.

== Offseason ==
- December 8, 2017: Chris Iannetta was signed as a free agent by the Colorado Rockies.
- December 15, 2017: Bryan Shaw was signed as a free agent by the Colorado Rockies.
- December 29, 2017: Wade Davis was signed as a free agent by the Colorado Rockies.

== Regular season ==
=== Season standings ===
==== National League West ====
NL West
Team	W	L	Pct.	GB	Home	Road
Los Angeles Dodgers	92	71	.564	—	45‍–‍37	47‍–‍34
Colorado Rockies	91	72	.558	1	47‍–‍34	44‍–‍38
Arizona Diamondbacks	82	80	.506	9½	40‍–‍41	42‍–‍39
San Francisco Giants	73	89	.451	18½	42‍–‍39	31‍–‍50
San Diego Padres	66	96	.407	25½	31‍–‍50	35‍–‍46

==== National League Wild Card ====
Division leaders
Team	W	L	Pct.
Milwaukee Brewers	96	67	.589
Los Angeles Dodgers	92	71	.564
Atlanta Braves	90	72	.556

Wild Card teams (Top 2 teams qualify for postseason)
Team	W	L	Pct.	GB
Chicago Cubs	95	68	.583	+4
Colorado Rockies	91	72	.558	—
St. Louis Cardinals	88	74	.543	2½
Pittsburgh Pirates	82	79	.509	8
Arizona Diamondbacks	82	80	.506	8½
Washington Nationals	82	80	.506	8½
Philadelphia Phillies	80	82	.494	10½
New York Mets	77	85	.475	13½
San Francisco Giants	73	89	.451	17½
Cincinnati Reds	67	95	.414	23½
San Diego Padres	66	96	.407	24½
Miami Marlins	63	98	.391	27

=== Record vs. opponents ===
2018 National League record Source: MLB Standings Grid – 2018
Team	AZ	ATL	CHC	CIN	COL	LAD	MIA	MIL	NYM	PHI	PIT	SD	SF	STL	WSH	AL
Arizona	—	3–4	3–4	3–3	8–11	11–8	6–1	1–5	2–5	4–2	6–1	12–7	8–11	3–3	2–5	10–10
Atlanta	4–3	—	3–3	3–4	2–5	2–5	14–5	3–4	13–6	12–7	5–1	4–3	3–3	4–2	10–9	8–12
Chicago	4–3	3–3	—	11–8	3–3	4–3	5–2	11–9	6–1	4–2	10–9	5–2	3–3	9–10	4–3	13–7
Cincinnati	3–3	4–3	8–11	—	2–4	6–1	2–5	6–13	3–3	3–4	5–14	3–4	4–2	7–12	1–6	10–10
Colorado	11–8	5–2	3–3	4–2	—	7–13	2–4	2–5	6–1	5–2	3–3	11–8	12–7	2–5	5–2	13–7
Los Angeles	8–11	5–2	3–4	1–6	13–7	—	2–4	4–3	4–2	3–4	5–1	14–5	10–9	3–4	5–1	12–8
Miami	1–6	5–14	2–5	5–2	4–2	4–2	—	2–5	7–12	8–11	1–4	2–5	4–3	3–3	6–13	9–11
Milwaukee	5–1	4–3	9–11	13–6	5–2	3–4	5–2	—	4–3	3–3	7–12	4–2	6–1	11–8	4–2	13–7
New York	5–2	6–13	1–6	3–3	1–6	2–4	12–7	3–4	—	11–8	3–4	4–2	4–3	3–3	11–8	8–12
Philadelphia	2–4	7–12	2–4	4–3	2–5	4–3	11–8	3–3	8–11	—	6–1	3–3	4–3	4–3	8–11	12–8
Pittsburgh	1–6	1–5	9–10	14–5	3–3	1–5	4–1	12–7	4–3	1–6	—	3–4	4–3	8–11	2–5	15–5
San Diego	7–12	3–4	2–5	4–3	8–11	5–14	5–2	2–4	2–4	3–3	4–3	—	8–11	4–3	2–4	7–13
San Francisco	11–8	3–3	3–3	2–4	7–12	9–10	3–4	1–6	3–4	3–4	3–4	11–8	—	2–5	4–2	8–12
St. Louis	3–3	2–4	10–9	12–7	5–2	4–3	3–3	8–11	3–3	3–4	11–8	3–4	5–2	—	5–2	11–9
Washington	5–2	9–10	3–4	6–1	2–5	1–5	13–6	2–4	8–11	11–8	5–2	4–2	2–4	2–5	—	9–11

The October 1 tiebreaker games were regular-season games that are included here.

=== Transactions ===
- July 26, 2018: Seung-hwan Oh was traded by the Toronto Blue Jays to the Colorado Rockies for Forrest Wall, Chad Spanberger (minors), and a player to be named later. The Colorado Rockies sent Bryan Baker (minors) (August 14, 2018) to the Toronto Blue Jays to complete the trade.
- July 29, 2018: Matt Holliday was signed as a free agent by the Colorado Rockies.
- August 31, 2018: Drew Butera was traded by the Kansas City Royals to the Colorado Rockies for Jerry Vasto and cash.

=== Major League Debuts ===
- Batters
  - Noel Cuevas (Apr 22)
  - Garrett Hampson (Jul 21)
- Pitchers
  - Harrison Musgrave (Apr 23)
  - Sam Howard (Jun 10)
  - Jerry Vasto (Jun 10)
  - Yency Almonte (Jun 21)
  - DJ Johnson (Sep 9)

== Roster ==
2018 Colorado Rockies
**Roster**
**Pitchers**: 62 Yency Almonte; 44 Tyler Anderson; 35 Chad Bettis; 71 Wade Davis; 38 Mike Dunn; 21 Kyle Freeland; 55 Jon Gray; 34 Jeff Hoffman; 61 Sam Howard; 63 D. J. Johnson; 48 Germán Márquez; 51 Jake McGee; 59 Harrison Musgrave; 45 Scott Oberg; 18 Seung-hwan Oh; 0 Adam Ottavino; 50 Brooks Pounders; 52 Chris Rusin; 49 Antonio Senzatela; 29 Bryan Shaw; 30 Jerry Vasto	**Catchers**: 16 Drew Butera; 22 Chris Iannetta; 23 Tom Murphy; 14 Tony Wolters; **Infielders**: 28 Nolan Arenado; 6 Daniel Castro; 20 Ian Desmond; 7,1 Garrett Hampson; 9 DJ LeMahieu; 24 Ryan McMahon; 27 Trevor Story; 4 Pat Valaika	**Outfielders**: 19 Charlie Blackmon; 56 Noel Cuevas; 26 David Dahl; 5 Carlos González; 7 Matt Holliday; 8 Gerardo Parra; 15 Raimel Tapia; 3 Mike Tauchman	**Manager**: 10 Bud Black; **Coaches**: 39 Stu Cole (third base); 43 Tony Diaz (first base); 58 Duane Espy (hitting); 36 Steve Foster (pitching); 53 Ron Gideon (coach); 40 Darren Holmes (bullpen); 66 Aaron Muñoz (bullpen catcher); 11 Mike Redmond (bench); 41 Jeff Salazar (assistant hitting)

=== Game log ===
2018 game log: 91–72 (Home: 47–34; Away: 44–38)
March: 1–2 (Home: 0–0; Away: 1–2)

#	Date	Opponent	Score	Win	Loss	Save	Attendance	Record	Streak
1	March 29	@ Diamondbacks	2–8	Corbin (1–0)	**Gray** (0–1)		48,703	0–1	L1
2	March 30	@ Diamondbacks	8–9	Ray (1–0)	**Senzatela** (0–1)	Boxberger (1)	23,937	0–2	L2
3	March 31	@ Diamondbacks	2–1	**Shaw** (1–0)	Salas (0–1)	**Davis** (1)	33,346	1–2	W1

April: 14–13 (Home: 5–7; Away: 9–6)

#	Date	Opponent	Score	Win	Loss	Save	Attendance	Record	Streak
4	April 2	@ Padres	7–4	**Bettis** (1–0)	Mitchell (0–1)	**Davis** (2)	16,899	2–2	W2
5	April 3	@ Padres	4–8	Ross (1–0)	**Freeland** (0–1)	Hand (1)	19,283	2–3	L1
6	April 4	@ Padres	5–2	**Gray** (1–1)	Richard (0–1)	**Davis** (3)	19,698	3–3	W1
7	April 5	@ Padres	3–1	**Ottavino** (1–0)	Hand (0–2)	**Davis** (4)	20,509	4–3	W2
8	April 6	Braves	3–8	McCarthy (2–0)	**Márquez** (0–1)		48,216	4–4	L1
9	April 7	Braves	3–2 (10)	**Ottavino** (2–0)	Vizcaíno (1–1)		40,120	5–4	W1
10	April 8	Braves	0–4	Newcomb (1–1)	**Freeland** (0–2)		42,031	5–5	L1
11	April 9	Padres	6–7	Richard (1–1)	**Gray** (1–2)	Hand (3)	20,291	5–6	L2
12	April 10	Padres	2–5	Lucchesi (1–0)	**Shaw** (1–1)	Hand (4)	22,446	5–7	L3
13	April 11	Padres	6–4	**Senzatela** (1–1)	Baumann (0–1)	**Davis** (5)	21,248	6–7	W1
14	April 12	@ Nationals	5–1	**Bettis** (2–0)	González (1–1)		24,213	7–7	W2
15	April 13	@ Nationals	2–1	**Oberg** (1–0)	Roark (1–1)	**Davis** (6)	32,702	8–7	W3
16	April 14	@ Nationals	2–6	Scherzer (3–1)	**Gray** (1–3)		31,700	8–8	L1
17	April 15	@ Nationals	6–5	**Ottavino** (3–0)	Doolittle (0–1)	**Davis** (7)	25,462	9–8	W1
18	April 16	@ Pirates	6–2	**Márquez** (1–1)	Brault (2–1)		8,958	10–8	W2
19	April 17	@ Pirates	2–0	**Bettis** (3–0)	Williams (3–1)	**Davis** (8)	8,869	11–8	W3
20	April 18	@ Pirates	2–10	Kuhl (2–1)	**Freeland** (0–3)		8,970	11–9	L1
21	April 20	Cubs	5–16	Hendricks (1–1)	**Gray** (1–4)		35,290	11–10	L2
22	April 21	Cubs	5–2	**Anderson** (1–0)	Darvish (0–2)	**Davis** (9)	40,107	12–10	W1
23	April 22	Cubs	7–9	Quintana (2–1)	**Márquez** (1–2)	Morrow (4)	48,137	12–11	L1
24	April 23	Padres	5–13	Erlin (1–2)	**McGee** (0–1)		24,419	12–12	L2
25	April 24	Padres	8–0	**Freeland** (1–3)	Lauer (0–1)		23,727	13–12	W1
26	April 25	Padres	5–2	**Gray** (2–4)	Ross (2–2)		32,989	14–12	W2
27	April 27	@ Marlins	1–0	**Senzatela** (2–1)	Ureña (0–4)	**Davis** (10)	5,931	15–12	W3
28	April 28	@ Marlins	1–4	Chen (1–0)	**Márquez** (1–3)	Barraclough (1)	9,659	15–13	L1
29	April 29	@ Marlins	0–3	Smith (1–3)	**Bettis** (3–1)	Ziegler (3)	11,203	15–14	L2
30	April 30	@ Cubs	2–3	Farrell (1–0)	**Freeland** (1–4)	Cishek (1)	35,922	15–15	L3

May: 15–11 (Home: 6–6; Away 9–5)

#	Date	Opponent	Score	Win	Loss	Save	Attendance	Record	Streak
31	May 1	@ Cubs	3–1	**Gray** (3–4)	Hendricks (2–2)	**Davis** (11)	40,077	16–15	W1
32	May 2	@ Cubs	11–2	**Anderson** (2–0)	Darvish (0–3)		32,909	17–15	W2
33	May 4	@ Mets	8–7	**Márquez** (2–3)	Wheeler (2–2)	**Davis** (12)	34,030	18–15	W3
34	May 5	@ Mets	2–0	**Bettis** (4–1)	Matz (1–3)	**Davis** (13)	37,550	19–15	W4
35	May 6	@ Mets	3–2	**Freeland** (2–4)	Robles (2–1)	**Ottavino** (1)	33,580	20–15	W5
36	May 8	Angels	4–2	**Gray** (4–4)	Heaney (1–2)	**Davis** (14)	33,144	21–15	W6
37	May 9	Angels	0–8	Barría (3–1)	**Anderson** (2–1)		33,689	21–16	L1
38	May 10	Brewers	2–5	Chacín (3–1)	**Márquez** (2–4)	Jeffress (3)	31,093	21–17	L2
39	May 11	Brewers	10–11 (10)	Jeffress (3–0)	**McGee** (0–2)	Hader (6)	36,139	21–18	L3
40	May 12	Brewers	4–0	**Freeland** (3–4)	Suter (2–3)		35,408	22–18	W1
41	May 13	Brewers	3–7	Peralta (1–0)	**Gray** (4–5)		40,453	22–19	L1
42	May 14	@ Padres	6–4	**Anderson** (3–1)	Makita (0–1)	**Davis** (15)	17,245	23–19	W1
43	May 15	@ Padres	0–4	Lyles (1–1)	**Márquez** (2–5)	Hand (12)	19,598	23–20	L1
44	May 17	@ Giants	5–3 (12)	**McGee** (1–2)	Johnson (2–2)	**Davis** (16)	37,224	24–20	W1
45	May 18	@ Giants	6–1	**Freeland** (4–4)	Holland (2–5)		40,970	25–20	W2
46	May 19	@ Giants	4–9	Stratton (5–3)	**Gray** (4–6)		39,195	25–21	L1
47	May 20	@ Giants	5–9	Dyson (2–0)	**Shaw** (1–2)		40,334	25–22	L2
48	May 21	@ Dodgers	2–1	**Márquez** (3–5)	Báez (1–3)	**Davis** (17)	42,805	26–22	W1
49	May 22	@ Dodgers	3–5	Chargois (2–1)	**Shaw** (1–3)	Jansen (9)	43,719	26–23	L1
50	May 23	@ Dodgers	0–3	Maeda (4–3)	**Freeland** (4–5)	Jansen (10)	45,884	26–24	L2
51	May 25	Reds	5–4	**Gray** (5–6)	Romano (2–6)	**Davis** (18)	33,193	27–24	W1
52	May 26	Reds	5–6	Lorenzen (1–0)	**Rusin** (0–1)	Hughes (3)	42,844	27–25	L1
53	May 27	Reds	8–2	**Márquez** (4–5)	Harvey (1–3)		36,387	28–25	W1
54	May 28	Giants	6–5 (10)	**Shaw** (2–3)	Strickland (2–2)		32,409	29–25	W2
55	May 29	Giants	11–4	**Freeland** (5–5)	Samardzija (1–4)		27,348	30–25	W3
56	May 30	Giants	4–7	Holland (3–6)	**Musgrave** (0–1)	Strickland (11)	29,400	30–26	L1

June: 11–16 (Home: 4–9; Away 7–7)

#	Date	Opponent	Score	Win	Loss	Save	Attendance	Record	Streak
57	June 1	Dodgers	8–11	Santana (1–0)	**Pounders** (0–1)	Jansen (13)	42,711	30–27	L2
58	June 2	Dodgers	4–12	Báez (2–3)	**Shaw** (2–4)		47,703	30–28	L3
59	June 3	Dodgers	7–10	Cingrani (1–2)	**Davis** (0–1)	Jansen (14)	41,851	30–29	L4
60	June 5	@ Reds	9–6	**Freeland** (6–5)	DeSclafani (0–1)	**Davis** (19)	21,944	31–29	W1
61	June 6	@ Reds	6–3	**Gray** (6–6)	Romano (3–7)	**Davis** (20)	19,762	32–29	W2
62	June 7	@ Reds	5–7 (13)	Floro (2–1)	**Rusin** (0–2)		15,957	32–30	L1
63	June 8	Diamondbacks	4–9	Greinke (5–4)	**Márquez** (4–6)		38,917	32–31	L2
64	June 9	Diamondbacks	12–7	Bracho (2–0)	**Shaw** (2–5)		43,197	32–32	L3
65	June 10	Diamondbacks	8–3	Godley (6–5)	**Freeland** (6–6)		36,433	32–33	L4
66	June 12	@ Phillies	5–4	Nola (8–2)	**Gray** (6–7)	Domínguez (3)	19,556	32–34	L5
67	June 13	@ Phillies	7–2	**Anderson** (4–1)	Pivetta (4–6)		20,075	33–34	W1
68	June 14	@ Phillies	3–9	Velasquez (5–7)	**Márquez** (4–7)		22,500	33–35	L1
69	June 15	@ Rangers	9–5	**Bettis** (5–1)	Méndez (0–1)		30,448	34–35	W1
70	June 16	@ Rangers	5–2	Leclerc (2–2)	**Musgrave** (0–2)	Kela (15)	23,468	34–36	L1
71	June 17	@ Rangers	13–12	Chavez (3–1)	**Davis** (0–2)		25,513	34–37	L2
72	June 18	Mets	12–2	deGrom (5–2)	**Anderson** (4–2)		33,815	34–38	L3
73	June 19	Mets	10–8	**Márquez** (5–7)	Vargas (2–6)		29,710	35–38	W1
74	June 20	Mets	10–8	**Shaw** (3–5)	Gsellman (5–2)	**Davis** (21)	38,685	36–38	W2
75	June 21	Mets	6–4	**Freeland** (7–6)	Matz (3–5)	**McGee** (1)	44,010	37–38	W3
76	June 22	Marlins	11–3	**Gray** (7–7)	Chen (2–4)		35,468	38–38	W4
77	June 23	Marlins	6–2	Richards (2–4)	**Anderson** (4–3)		39,032	38–39	L1
78	June 24	Marlins	8–5	Rucinski (2–1)	**Márquez** (5–8)	Barraclough (7)	34,172	38–40	L2
79	June 26	@ Giants	3–2	Watson (2–2)	**Ottavino** (3–1)	Dyson (3)	36,070	38–41	L3
80	June 27	@ Giants	1–0	Moronta (4–1)	**Musgrave** (0–3)		36,046	38–42	L4
81	June 28	@ Giants	9–8	**Ottavino** (4–1)	Dyson (2–2)	**Davis** (22)	37,529	39–42	W1
82	June 29	@ Dodgers	3–1	**Anderson** (5–3)	Hill (1–3)	**Davis** (23)	41,909	40–42	W2
83	June 30	@ Dodgers	3–1	**Márquez** (6–8)	Maeda (5–5)	**Ottavino** (2)	46,172	41–42	W3

July: 17–6 (Home: 12–2; Away 5–4)

#	Date	Opponent	Score	Win	Loss	Save	Attendance	Record	Streak
84	July 1	@ Dodgers	6–4	Hudson (3–2)	**Ottavino** (4–2)	Jansen (22)	45,725	41–43	L1
85	July 2	Giants	5–2	**Freeland** (8–6)	Bumgarner (1–3)	**Davis** (24)	40,333	42–43	W1
86	July 3	Giants	8–1	**Senzatela** (3–1)	Stratton (8–6)		48,072	43–43	W2
87	July 4	Giants	1–0	**Anderson** (6–3)	Suarez (3–5)	**Davis** (25)	48,158	44–43	W3
88	July 6	@ Mariners	7–1	**Márquez** (7–8)	Hernández (8–7)		26,554	45–43	W4
89	July 7	@ Mariners	5–1	**Oberg** (2–0)	Paxton (8–3)			46–43	W5
90	July 8	@ Mariners	6–4	LeBlanc (5–0)	**Senzatela** (3–2)	Díaz (35)	34,440	46–44	L1
91	July 10	Diamondbacks	5–3	Delgado (2–0)	**McGee** (1–3)	Boxberger (22)	43,405	46–45	L2
92	July 11	Diamondbacks	19–2	**Márquez** (8–8)	Miller (0–4)		33,919	47–45	W1
93	July 12	Diamondbacks	5–1	**Oberg** (3–0)	Ray (3–2)		41,410	48–45	W2
94	July 13	Mariners	10–7	**Musgrave** (1–3)	Bergman (0–1)	**Davis** (26)	38,126	49–45	W3
95	July 14	Mariners	4–1	**Gray** (8–7)	LeBlanc (5–1)	**Davis** (27)	47,789	50–45	W4
96	July 15	Mariners	4–3	**Oberg** (4–0)	Vincent (3–2)		35,630	51–45	W5
**89th All-Star Game in Washington, D.C.**
97	July 20	@ Diamondbacks	11–10	**Oberg** (5–0)	Bradley (2–2)	**Ottavino** (3)	29,546	52–45	W6
98	July 21	@ Diamondbacks	6–5	**Oberg** (6–0)	Hirano (2–2)	**Davis** (28)	43,340	53–45	W7
99	July 22	@ Diamondbacks	6–1	Greinke (11–5)	**Senzatela** (3–3)		32,985	53–46	L1
100	July 24	Astros	8–2 (10)	Rondón (2–2)	**Davis** (0–3)		43,184	53–47	L2
101	July 25	Astros	3–2	**Davis** (1–3)	McHugh (5–1)		40,948	54–47	W1
102	July 27	Athletics	3–1	**Freeland** (9–6)	Manaea (9–7)	**Ottavino** (4)	40,229	55–47	W2
103	July 28	Athletics	4–1	**Senzatela** (4–3)	Anderson (2–3)	**Davis** (29)	47,809	56–47	W3
104	July 29	Athletics	3–2	**Márquez** (9–8)	Montas (5–3)	**Davis** (30)	41,988	57–47	W4
105	July 30	@ Cardinals	5–4 (10)	Hudson (1–0)	**McGee** (1–4)		41,856	57–48	L1
106	July 31	@ Cardinals	6–3	**Gray** (9–7)	Flaherty (4–6)	**Davis** (31)	42,636	58–48	W1

August: 14–14 (Home: 7–6; Away 7–8)

#	Date	Opponent	Score	Win	Loss	Save	Attendance	Record	Streak
107	August 1	@ Cardinals	6–3	Gomber (1–0)	**Freeland** (9–7)		40,544	58–49	L1
108	August 2	@ Cardinals	3–2	Shreve (3–2)	**Davis** (1–4)		41,478	58–50	L2
109	August 3	@ Brewers	5–3	Burnes (2–0)	**Davis** (1–5)		37,751	58–51	L3
110	August 4	@ Brewers	8–4	Peralta (5–2)	**Anderson** (6–4)	Hader (8)	40,524	58–52	L4
111	August 5	@ Brewers	5–4 (11)	**Oberg** (7–0)	Knebel (2–2)	**Oh** (3)	37,954	59–52	W1
112	August 6	Pirates	2–0	**Freeland** (10–7)	Musgrove (4–6)	**Davis** (32)	34,471	60–52	W2
113	August 7	Pirates	10–2	Taillon (9–8)	**Bettis** (5–2)		31,649	60–53	L1
114	August 8	Pirates	4–3	Archer (4–5)	**Márquez** (9–9)	Vázquez (26)	35,702	60–54	L2
115	August 9	Dodgers	8–5	Ferguson (3–1)	**Davis** (1–6)	Alexander (2)	43,076	60–55	L3
116	August 10	Dodgers	5–4	**McGee** (2–4)	Rosscup (0–1)	**Ottavino** (5)	42,184	61–55	W1
117	August 11	Dodgers	3–2	**Shaw** (4–5)	Chargois (2–4)		47,633	62–55	W2
118	August 12	Dodgers	4–3	**Davis** (2–6)	Floro (4–3)		40,599	63–55	W3
119	August 14	@ Astros	5–1	**Márquez** (10–9)	Verlander (11–8)		35,813	64–55	W4
120	August 15	@ Astros	12–1	Cole (11–5)	**Anderson** (6–5)		29,967	64–56	L1
121	August 16	@ Braves	5–3	**Oh** (5–3)	Brach (1–3)	**Davis** (33)	23,428	65–56	W1
122	August 17	@ Braves	11–5	**Freeland** (11–7)	Newcomb (10–6)		28,964	66–56	W2
123	August 18	@ Braves	5–3 (10)	**Ottavino** (5–2)	Jackson (1–1)	**Davis** (34)	42,143	67–56	W3
124	August 19	@ Braves	4–2	**Márquez** (11–9)	Sánchez (6–4)	**Davis** (35)	33,942	68–56	W4
125	August 21	Padres	4–3	Erlin (3–3)	**Anderson** (6–6)	Yates (5)	27,862	68–57	L1
126	August 22	Padres	6–2	**Gray** (10–7)	Nix (1–2)		28,966	69–57	W1
127	August 23	Padres	4–3	**Rusin** (1–2)	Yates (4–3)		30,625	70–57	W2
128	August 24	Cardinals	7–5	Martínez (7–6)	**Senzatela** (4–4)	Norris (27)	43,578	70–58	L1
129	August 25	Cardinals	9–1	**Ottavino** (6–2)	Hudson (4–1)		47,785	71–58	W1
130	August 26	Cardinals	12–3	Gomber (4–0)	**Anderson** (6–7)		41,235	71–59	L1
131	August 27	@ Angels	10–7	Johnson (5–3)	**Ottavino** (6–3)	Ramirez (1)	35,305	71–60	L2
132	August 28	@ Angels	3–2	**Freeland** (12–7)	Ramirez (4–5)	**Davis** (36)	35,207	72–60	W1
133	August 30	@ Padres	3–2 (13)	Stock (1–1)	**Shaw** (4–6)		20,056	72–61	L1
134	August 31	@ Padres	7–0	Kennedy (1–2)	**Senzatela** (4–5)		21,408	72–62	L2

September/October: 19–10 (Home: 13–4; Away 6–6)

#	Date	Opponent	Score	Win	Loss	Save	Attendance	Record	Streak
135	September 1	@ Padres	4–2	**Gray** (11–7)	Erlin (3–5)	**Davis** (37)	35,779	73–62	W1
136	September 2	@ Padres	7–3	**Freeland** (13–7)	Nix (2–3)		28,883	74–62	W2
137	September 3	Giants	9–8	**Oh** (6–3)	Watson (4–6)	**Davis** (38)	43,256	75–62	W3
138	September 4	Giants	6–2	**Rusin** (2–2)	Moronta (5–2)		24,727	76–62	W4
139	September 5	Giants	5–3	**Musgrave** (2–3)	Suarez (6–10)	**Ottavino** (6)	24,790	77–62	W5
140	September 7	Dodgers	4–2	Kershaw (7–5)	**Rusin** (2–3)	Maeda (2)	41,547	77–63	L1
141	September 8	Dodgers	4–2	**Freeland** (14–7)	Buehler (6–5)	**Davis** (39)	47,867	78–63	W1
142	September 9	Dodgers	9–6	Hill (8–5)	**Anderson** (6–8)	Alexander (3)	40,157	78–64	L1
143	September 10	Diamondbacks	13–2	**Márquez** (12–9)	Godley (14–9)		25,114	79–64	W1
144	September 11	Diamondbacks	6–3	Greinke (14–9)	**Senzatela** (4–6)	Hirano (1)	26,510	79–65	L1
145	September 12	Diamondbacks	5–4	**Davis** (3–6)	Hirano (4–3)		31,687	80–65	W1
146	September 13	Diamondbacks	10–3	**Freeland** (15–7)	Koch (5–5)		31,783	81–65	W2
147	September 14	@ Giants	2–0	Stratton (10–9)	**Anderson** (6–9)		37,800	81–66	L1
148	September 15	@ Giants	3–0	Bumgarner (6–6)	**Márquez** (12–10)	Smith (12)	38,204	81–67	L2
149	September 16	@ Giants	3–2	**Senzatela** (5–6)	Rodríguez (6–4)	**Davis** (40)	38,824	82–67	W1
150	September 17	@ Dodgers	8–2	Ryu (5–3)	**Gray** (11–8)		45,970	82–68	L1
151	September 18	@ Dodgers	3–2 (10)	Floro (6–3)	**Ottavino** (6–4)		49,537	82–69	L2
152	September 19	@ Dodgers	5–2	Ferguson (8–5)	**Oberg** (7–1)	Jansen (36)	50,141	82–70	L3
153	September 21	@ Diamondbacks	6–2	**Márquez** (13–10)	Greinke (14–11)		28,833	83–70	W1
154	September 22	@ Diamondbacks	5–1	**Senzatela** (6–6)	Corbin (11–7)		35,094	84–70	W2
155	September 23	@ Diamondbacks	2–0	**Freeland** (16–7)	Godley (14–11)	**Davis** (41)	29,191	85–70	W3
156	September 24	Phillies	10–1	**Gray** (12–8)	Eflin (11–8)		30,336	86–70	W4
157	September 25	Phillies	10–3	**Johnson** (1–0)	Velasquez (9–12)		30,217	87–70	W5
158	September 26	Phillies	14–0	**Márquez** (14–10)	Pivetta (7–14)		35,181	88–70	W6
159	September 27	Phillies	5–3	**Oberg** (8–1)	Arrieta (10–11)	**Davis** (42)	36,448	89–70	W7
160	September 28	Nationals	5–2	**Freeland** (17–7)	Ross (0–2)	**Davis** (43)	48,089	90–70	W8
161	September 29	Nationals	2–12	Strasburg (10–7)	**Gray** (12–9)		47,781	90–71	L1
162	September 30	Nationals	12–0	**Anderson** (7–9)	Fedde (2–4)		47,833	91–71	W1
163	October 1	@ Dodgers	2–5	Buehler (8–5)	Márquez (14–11)	—	47,816	91–72	L1

Legend: = Win = Loss = Postponement
Bold = Rockies team member

== Postseason ==
=== Game log ===
2018 Postseason Game Log (1–3) (Home: 0–1; Away: 1–2)
NL Wild Card Game (1–0)

#	Date	Opponent	Score	Win	Loss	Save	Attendance	Record
1	October 2	@ Cubs	2–1 (13)	Oberg (1–0)	Hendricks (0–1)	—	40,151	1–0

NLDS (0–3)

#	Date	Opponent	Score	Win	Loss	Save	Attendance	Record
1	October 4	@ Brewers	2–3 (10)	Soria (1–0)	Ottavino (0–1)	—	43,382	0–1
2	October 5	@ Brewers	0–4	Chacín (1–0)	Anderson (0–1)	—	44,547	0–2
3	October 7	Brewers	0–6	Burnes (1–0)	Márquez (0–1)	—	40,658	0–3

=== Postseason rosters ===
Playoff rosters
National League Wild Card Game

- Pitchers: 0 Adam Ottavino 18 Seung-hwan Oh 21 Kyle Freeland 45 Scott Oberg 49 Antonio Senzatela 51 Jake McGee 52 Chris Rusin 59 Harrison Musgrave 63 D. J. Johnson 71 Wade Davis
- Catchers: 14 Tony Wolters 16 Drew Butera 22 Chris Iannetta
- Infielders: 1 Garrett Hampson 4 Pat Valaika 9 DJ LeMahieu 20 Ian Desmond 24 Ryan McMahon 27 Trevor Story 28 Nolan Arenado
- Outfielders: 5 Carlos González 7 Matt Holliday 8 Gerardo Parra 19 Charlie Blackmon 26 David Dahl

National League Division Series

- Pitchers: 0 Adam Ottavino 18 Seung-hwan Oh 21 Kyle Freeland 35 Chad Bettis 44 Tyler Anderson 45 Scott Oberg 48 Germán Márquez 49 Antonio Senzatela 52 Chris Rusin 59 Harrison Musgrave 63 D. J. Johnson 71 Wade Davis
- Catchers: 14 Tony Wolters 22 Chris Iannetta
- Infielders: 1 Garrett Hampson 9 DJ LeMahieu 20 Ian Desmond 24 Ryan McMahon 27 Trevor Story 28 Nolan Arenado
- Outfielders: 5 Carlos González 7 Matt Holliday 8 Gerardo Parra 19 Charlie Blackmon 26 David Dahl

== Player stats ==
= Indicates team leader

=== Batting ===
==== Starters by position ====
Note: Pos = Position; G = Games played; AB = At bats; H = Hits; Avg. = Batting average; HR = Home runs; RBI = Runs batted in

Pos	Player	G	AB	H	Avg.	HR	RBI
C	Chris Iannetta	110	299	67	.224	11	36
1B	Ian Desmond	160	555	131	.236	22	88
2B	DJ LeMahieu	128	533	147	.276	15	62
SS	Trevor Story	157	598	174	.291	37	108
3B	Nolan Arenado	156	590	175	.297	38	110
LF	Gerardo Parra	142	401	114	.284	6	53
CF	Charlie Blackmon	156	626	182	.291	29	70
RF	Carlos González	132	463	128	.276	16	64

==== Other batters ====
Note: G = Games played; AB = At bats; H = Hits; Avg. = Batting average; HR = Home runs; RBI = Runs batted in

Player	G	AB	H	Avg.	HR	RBI
David Dahl	77	249	68	.273	16	48
Tony Wolters	74	182	31	.170	3	27
Ryan McMahon	91	181	42	.232	5	19
Noel Cuevas	75	146	34	.233	2	10
Pat Valaika	68	122	19	.156	2	5
Tom Murphy	37	93	21	.226	2	11
Matt Holliday	25	53	15	.283	2	3
Daniel Castro	18	46	8	.174	1	6
Garrett Hampson	24	40	11	.275	0	4
Mike Tauchman	21	32	3	.094	0	0
Raimel Tapia	25	25	5	.200	1	6
Drew Butera	10	14	3	.214	1	3

=== Pitching ===
==== Starting pitchers ====
Note: G = Games pitched; IP = Innings pitched; W = Wins; L = Losses; ERA = Earned run average; SO = Strikeouts

Player	G	IP	W	L	ERA	SO
Kyle Freeland	33	202.1	17	7	2.85	173
Germán Márquez	33	196.0	14	11	3.77	230
Tyler Anderson	32	176.0	7	9	4.55	164
Jon Gray	31	172.1	12	9	5.12	183
Chad Bettis	27	120.1	5	2	5.01	80

==== Other pitchers ====
Note: G = Games pitched; IP = Innings pitched; W = Wins; L = Losses; ERA = Earned run average; SO = Strikeouts

Player	G	IP	W	L	ERA	SO
Antonio Senzatela	23	90.1	6	6	4.38	69
Jeff Hoffman	6	8.2	0	0	9.35	5

==== Relief pitchers ====
Note: G = Games pitched; W = Wins; L = Losses; SV = Saves; ERA = Earned run average; SO = Strikeouts

Player	G	W	L	SV	ERA	SO
Wade Davis	69	3	6	43	4.13	78
Adam Ottavino	75	6	4	6	2.43	112
Bryan Shaw	61	4	6	0	5.93	54
Jake McGee	61	2	4	1	6.49	47
Scott Oberg	56	8	1	0	2.45	57
Chris Rusin	49	2	3	0	6.09	30
Harrison Musgrave	35	2	3	0	4.63	32
Seung-hwan Oh	25	2	0	1	2.53	24
Mike Dunn	25	0	0	0	9.00	12
Brooks Pounders	14	0	1	0	7.63	17
Yency Almonte	14	0	0	0	1.84	14
DJ Johnson	7	1	0	0	4.26	9
Sam Howard	4	0	0	0	2.25	1
Jerry Vasto	1	0	0	0	40.25	1

== Farm system ==
Level	Team	League	Manager
AAA	Albuquerque Isotopes	Pacific Coast League	Glenallen Hill
AA	Hartford Yard Goats	Eastern League	Warren Schaeffer
A-Advanced	Lancaster JetHawks	California League	Fred Ocasio
A	Asheville Tourists	South Atlantic League	Robinson Cancel
A-Short Season	Boise Hawks	Northwest League	Scott Little
Rookie	Grand Junction Rockies	Pioneer League	Jake Opitz

Records
Preceded by 2017	Colorado Rockies seasons 2018	Succeeded by 2019
