= List of Colorado Rockies seasons =

Colorado Rockies
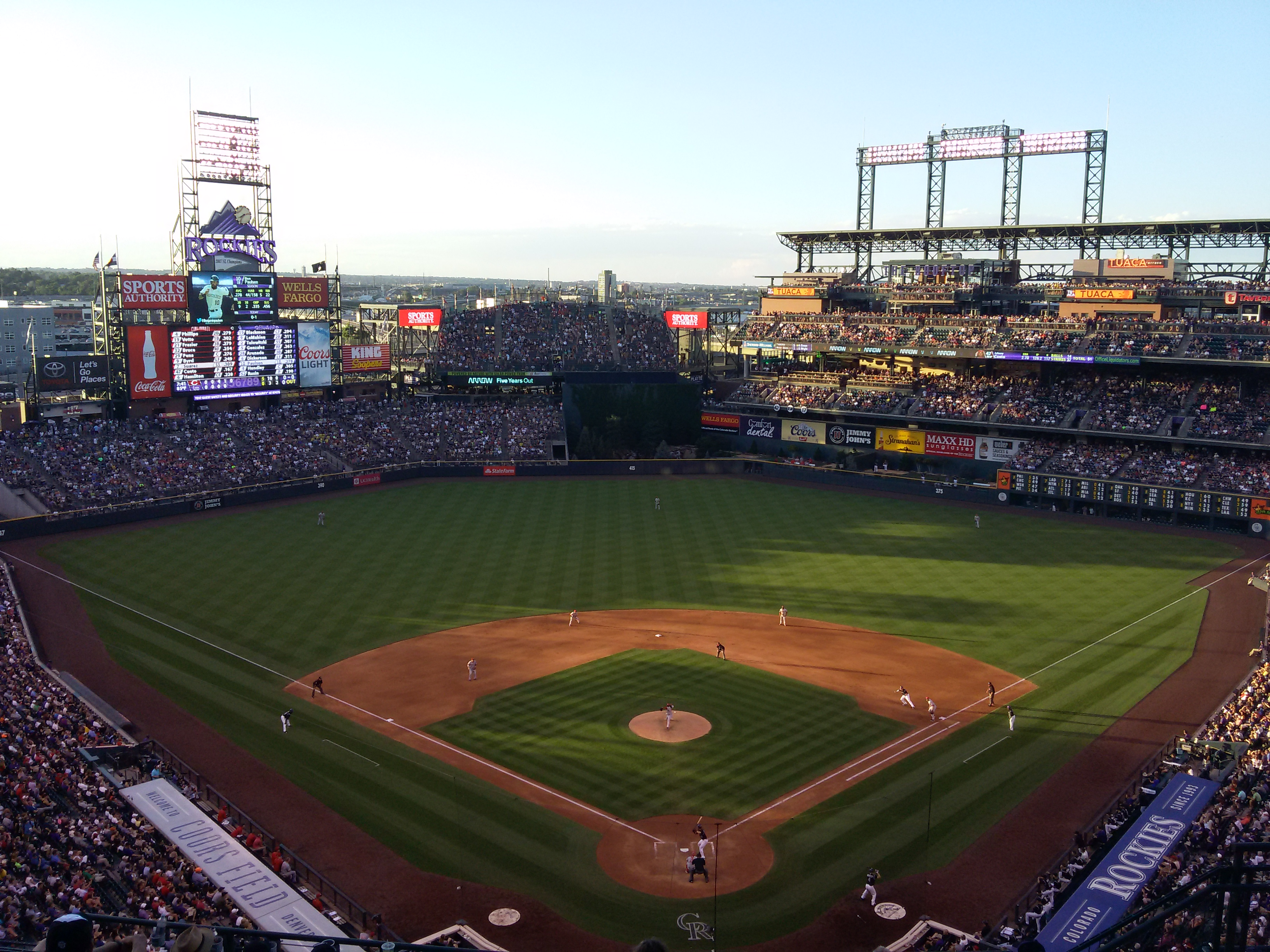
- Coors Field, where the Rockies have played since 1995.

Franchise History
- Established: April 5, 1993; 33 years ago
- Major League: Major League Baseball
- Current League / Division: National League / West
- Seasons Played: 34 (as of 2026 season)

Accomplishments
- World Series Titles: 0
- League Pennants: 1 (NL)
- Division Titles: 0

The Colorado Rockies are a professional baseball team based in Denver, Colorado. The club has been owned since formation by Jerry McMorris and Charles and Richard Monfort. The Rockies were created as an expansion team for the 1993 season and rose to a postseason appearance after three seasons and the 1994–95 strike. Since then they have played in the postseason four more times: in 2007 (when they lost the World Series to the Red Sox), 2009, 2017 and 2018. In 2025, the Rockies won only 43 games – the fewest in their history over a full season. They are one of the two MLB franchises that has never won a division title, alongside their expansion cousin, the Miami Marlins.

== Year by year ==
World Series champions †	NL champions *	Division champions ^	Wild card berth (1994–present) ¤

MLB season	Team season	Level	League	Division	Finish	Wins	Losses	Win%	GB	Postseason	Awards
1993	1993	MLB	NL	West	6th	67	95	.414	37		
1994	1994	MLB	NL	West	3rd	53	64	.453	6½	Playoffs canceled	
1995	1995	MLB	NL	West	2nd ¤	77	67	.535	1	Lost NLDS (Braves) 3–1	Don Baylor (MOY)
1996	1996	MLB	NL	West	3rd	83	79	.512	8		
1997	1997	MLB	NL	West	3rd	83	79	.512	8		Larry Walker (MVP)
1998	1998	MLB	NL	West	4th	77	85	.475	21		
1999	1999	MLB	NL	West	5th	72	90	.444	28		
2000	2000	MLB	NL	West	4th	82	80	.506	15		
2001	2001	MLB	NL	West	5th	73	89	.451	19		
2002	2002	MLB	NL	West	4th	73	89	.451	25		Jason Jennings (ROY)
2003	2003	MLB	NL	West	4th	74	88	.457	26½		
2004	2004	MLB	NL	West	4th	68	94	.420	25		
2005	2005	MLB	NL	West	5th	67	95	.414	15		
2006	2006	MLB	NL	West	T-4th	76	86	.469	12		
2007	2007	MLB	NL *	West	2nd ¤	90	73	.552	½	Won NLDS (Phillies) 3–0; Won NLCS (Diamondbacks) 4–0; Lost World Series (Red Sox) 4–0 *	
2008	2008	MLB	NL	West	3rd	74	88	.457	10		
2009	2009	MLB	NL	West	2nd ¤	92	70	.568	3	Lost NLDS (Phillies) 3–1	Jim Tracy (MOY)
2010	2010	MLB	NL	West	3rd	83	79	.512	9		
2011	2011	MLB	NL	West	4th	73	89	.451	21		
2012	2012	MLB	NL	West	5th	64	98	.395	30		
2013	2013	MLB	NL	West	5th	74	88	.457	18		
2014	2014	MLB	NL	West	4th	66	96	.407	28		
2015	2015	MLB	NL	West	5th	68	94	.420	24		
2016	2016	MLB	NL	West	3rd	75	87	.463	16		
2017	2017	MLB	NL	West	3rd ¤	87	75	.537	17	Lost NLWC (Diamondbacks)	
2018	2018	MLB	NL	West	2nd ¤	91	72	.558	1	Won NLWC (Cubs); Lost NLDS (Brewers) 3–0	
2019	2019	MLB	NL	West	4th	71	91	.438	35		
2020	2020	MLB	NL	West	4th	26	34	.433	17		
2021	2021	MLB	NL	West	4th	74	87	.460	32½		
2022	2022	MLB	NL	West	5th	68	94	.420	43		
2023	2023	MLB	NL	West	5th	59	103	.364	41		
2024	2024	MLB	NL	West	5th	61	101	.377	37		
2025	2025	MLB	NL	West	5th	43	119	.265	50		
2026	2026	MLB	NL	West	5th	58	104	.358	42		
Totals						Wins	Losses	Win%			
Totals						2,422	2,922	.453	All-time regular season record (1993–2026)		
Totals						10	14	.417	All-time postseason record		
Totals						2,432	2,936	.453	All-time regular and postseason record		

== Record by decade ==
The following table describes the Rockies' MLB win–loss record by decade.

Decade	Wins	Losses	Pct
1990s	512	559	.478
2000s	769	852	.474
2010s	752	869	.464
2020s	389	642	.377
All-time	2,422	2,922	.453

These statistics are from Baseball Reference's Colorado Rockies Team History & Encyclopedia.

== Postseason appearances ==
Year	Wild Card Game/Series	LDS		LCS		World Series	
1995	None (Won NL Wild Card)	Atlanta Braves	L (1–3)				
2007	None (Won NL Wild Card)	Philadelphia Phillies	W (3–0)	Arizona Diamondbacks	W (4–0)	Boston Red Sox	L (0–4)
2009	None (Won NL Wild Card)	Philadelphia Phillies	L (1–3)				
2017	Arizona Diamondbacks L						
2018	Chicago Cubs W	Milwaukee Brewers	L (0–3)				

== Postseason record by year ==
The Rockies have made the postseason five times in their history with their first being in 1995 and the most recent being in 2018.

Postseason record by year
Year	Finish	Round	Opponent	Result		
1995	National League Wild Card	NLDS	Atlanta Braves	Lost	1	3
2007	National League Champions	NLDS	Philadelphia Phillies	Won	3	0
2007	National League Champions	NLCS	Arizona Diamondbacks	Won	4	0
2007	National League Champions	World Series	Boston Red Sox	Lost	0	4
2009	National League Wild Card	NLDS	Philadelphia Phillies	Lost	1	3
2017	National League Wild Card	Wild Card Game	Arizona Diamondbacks	Lost	0	1
2018	National League Wild Card Champions	Wild Card Game	Chicago Cubs	Won	1	0
2018	National League Wild Card Champions	NLDS	Milwaukee Brewers	Lost	0	3
5	Totals			3–5	10	14
