= 2018 Major League Baseball postseason =

2018 Major League Baseball playoffs

Tournament details
- Dates: October 2–28, 2018
- Teams: 10

Final positions
- Champions: Boston Red Sox (9th title)
- Runners-up: Los Angeles Dodgers

Tournament statistics
- Most HRs: Steve Pearce (BOS) & George Springer (HOU) (4)
- Most SBs: Cody Bellinger (LAD) (4)
- Most Ks (as pitcher): Walker Buehler (LAD) (29)

Awards
- MVP: Steve Pearce (BOS)

The 2018 Major League Baseball postseason was the playoff tournament of Major League Baseball for the 2018 season. The winners of the Division Series would move on to the League Championship Series to determine the pennant winners that face each other in the World Series.

In the American League, the Boston Red Sox and Cleveland Indians made their third straight appearances, the Houston Astros and New York Yankees made their second straight appearances, and the Oakland Athletics made their fourth appearance in the past seven years. This postseason was notable for being the first in which the American League had three teams that won at least 100 games or more in the regular season.

In the National League, the Los Angeles Dodgers made their sixth straight postseason appearance, the Colorado Rockies made their second straight appearance, the Chicago Cubs made their fourth straight appearance, the Atlanta Braves made their first appearance since 2013, and the Milwaukee Brewers made their first appearance since 2011. This was the first of seven consecutive postseason appearances for the Braves.

The postseason began on October 2, and ended on October 28, with the Red Sox defeating the Dodgers in five games in the 2018 World Series. It was the ninth title won by the Red Sox organization, tying the Oakland Athletics for the third most World Series championships.

== Playoff seeds ==
American League Teams National League Teams

The following teams qualified for the postseason:

=== American League ===
1. Boston Red Sox – 108–54, AL East champions
2. Houston Astros – 103–59, AL West champions
3. Cleveland Indians – 91–71, AL Central champions
4. New York Yankees – 100–62
5. Oakland Athletics – 97–65

=== National League ===
1. Milwaukee Brewers – 96–67, NL Central champions
2. Los Angeles Dodgers – 92–71, NL West champions
3. Atlanta Braves – 90–72, NL East champions
4. Chicago Cubs – 95–68
5. Colorado Rockies – 91–72

== Playoff bracket ==
Wild Card Games (ALWC, NLWC)
4	NY Yankees	1
5	Oakland	0
4	Chicago Cubs	0
5	Colorado	1

Division Series (ALDS, NLDS)
1	Boston	3
4	NY Yankees	1
American League
2	Houston	3
3	Cleveland	0
1	Milwaukee	3
5	Colorado	0
National League
2	LA Dodgers	3
3	Atlanta	1

League Championship Series (ALCS, NLCS)
1	Boston	4
2	Houston	1
1	Milwaukee	3
2	LA Dodgers	4

World Series
AL1	Boston	4
NL2	LA Dodgers	1

== American League Wild Card ==
=== (4) New York Yankees vs. (5) Oakland Athletics ===
October 3, 2018 8:08 pm (EDT) at Yankee Stadium in Bronx, New York, 70 °F (21 °C), partly cloudy
Team	1	2	3	4	5	6	7	8	9	R	H	E
Oakland	0	0	0	0	0	0	0	2	0	2	4	0
New York	2	0	0	0	0	4	0	1	X	7	7	1
WP: Dellin Betances (1–0) LP: Liam Hendriks (0–1); Home runs: OAK: Khris Davis (1); NYY: Aaron Judge (1), Giancarlo Stanton (1); Attendance: 49,620; Boxscore

This was the fourth postseason meeting between the Athletics and Yankees. The Yankees had won the previous three meetings (1981, 2000, 2001). The Yankees defeated the Athletics in a blowout win to advance to the ALDS for the second year in a row.

== National League Wild Card ==
=== (4) Chicago Cubs vs. (5) Colorado Rockies ===
October 2, 2018 7:08 pm (CDT) at Wrigley Field in Chicago, Illinois, 61 °F (16 °C), cloudy
Team	1	2	3	4	5	6	7	8	9	10	11	12	13	R	H	E
Colorado	1	0	0	0	0	0	0	0	0	0	0	0	1	2	11	1
Chicago	0	0	0	0	0	0	0	1	0	0	0	0	0	1	6	0
WP: Scott Oberg (1–0) LP: Kyle Hendricks (0–1); Home runs: COL: none CHC: none Attendance: 40,151; Boxscore

The Rockies upset the Cubs in a thirteen-inning duel, 2–1, to advance to the NLDS for the first time since 2009.

== American League Division Series ==
=== (1) Boston Red Sox vs. (4) New York Yankees ===
Boston won the series, 3–1.

Game	Date	Score	Location	Time	Attendance
1	October 5	New York Yankees – 4, Boston Red Sox – 5	Fenway Park	3:41	39,059
2	October 6	New York Yankees – 6, Boston Red Sox – 2	Fenway Park	3:31	39,151
3	October 8	Boston Red Sox – 16, New York Yankees – 1	Yankee Stadium	3:41	49,657
4	October 9	Boston Red Sox – 4, New York Yankees – 3	Yankee Stadium	3:28	49,641

This was the fourth postseason meeting in the history of the Red Sox–Yankees rivalry. They had last met in the ALCS in 2004, where the Red Sox became the first team in MLB history to win a series after facing a 3–0 series deficit. The Red Sox again defeated the Yankees to advance to the ALCS for the first time since 2013.

The Red Sox took Game 1 by one run as closer Craig Kimbrel held off a late Yankees rally. The Yankees evened the series with a 6–2 victory in Game 2 thanks to three home runs from Gary Sánchez and Aaron Judge respectively. Game 3 was the most notable matchup of the series, as the Red Sox blew out the Yankees 16–1 in Yankee Stadium despite having only one home run from Brock Holt, handing the Yankees their worst postseason loss ever. The Red Sox took a 4–0 lead in Game 4, and while the Yankees cut their lead to one in the bottom of the ninth, the Red Sox still held on to close out the series.

The Yankees and Red Sox would meet again in the Wild Card round in 2021 and 2025, with the Red Sox winning the former and the Yankees winning the latter.

=== (2) Houston Astros vs. (3) Cleveland Indians ===
Houston won the series, 3–0.

Game	Date	Score	Location	Time	Attendance
1	October 5	Cleveland Indians – 2, Houston Astros – 7	Minute Maid Park	3:36	43,514
2	October 6	Cleveland Indians – 1, Houston Astros – 3	Minute Maid Park	3:12	43,520
3	October 8	Houston Astros – 11, Cleveland Indians – 3	Progressive Field	4:02	37,252

The Astros swept the Indians to return to the ALCS for the second year in a row.

Justin Verlander pitched five solid innings as the Astros blew out the Indians in Game 1. Houston’s Gerrit Cole outdueled Cleveland’s Carlos Carrasco in a pitcher’s duel in Game 2 as they took a 2–0 series lead headed to Cleveland. The Astros blew out the Indians again in Game 3 to close out the series.

== National League Division Series ==
=== (1) Milwaukee Brewers vs. (5) Colorado Rockies ===
Milwaukee won the series, 3–0.

Game	Date	Score	Location	Time	Attendance
1	October 4	Colorado Rockies – 2, Milwaukee Brewers – 3 (10)	Miller Park	4:04	43,382
2	October 5	Colorado Rockies – 0, Milwaukee Brewers – 4	Miller Park	3:45	44,547
3	October 7	Milwaukee Brewers – 6, Colorado Rockies – 0	Coors Field	3:14	49,658

The Brewers swept the Rockies to return to the NLCS for the first time since 2011.

The Rockies were simply outmatched by the Brewers' offense and pitching. Game 1 was the only close game of the series, as Mike Moustakas won it for the Brewers with a walk-off RBI single off Colorado’s Adam Ottavino in the bottom of the tenth. Jhoulys Chacín and the Milwaukee bullpen kept the Rockies’ bats silent in Game 2 as they took a 2–0 series lead heading to Denver. Jesús Aguilar, Orlando Arcia, and Keon Broxton all homered for the Brewers in Game 3 as they shut out the Rockies yet again to finish the sweep.

As of 2026, this is the last time the Rockies appeared in the postseason.

=== (2) Los Angeles Dodgers vs. (3) Atlanta Braves ===
Los Angeles won the series, 3–1.

Game	Date	Score	Location	Time	Attendance
1	October 4	Atlanta Braves – 0, Los Angeles Dodgers – 6	Dodger Stadium	3:13	50,947
2	October 5	Atlanta Braves – 0, Los Angeles Dodgers – 3	Dodger Stadium	2:35	54,452
3	October 7	Los Angeles Dodgers – 5, Atlanta Braves – 6	SunTrust Park	3:36	42,385
4	October 8	Los Angeles Dodgers – 6 Atlanta Braves – 2	SunTrust Park	3:42	39,586

This was the third postseason meeting between the Dodgers and Braves. The Dodgers defeated the Braves in four games to return to the NLCS for the third year in a row and sixth time in ten years.

Hyun-jin Ryu pitched seven innings of shutout ball in Game 1 as the Dodgers shut out the Braves 6-0. In Game 2, Clayton Kershaw pitched eight shutout innings as he beat Aníbal Sánchez in a pitchers’ duel in another shutout win for the Dodgers as they took a 2–0 series lead headed to Atlanta. In Game 3, a grand slam from Ronald Acuña Jr. and another home run from Freddie Freeman propelled the Braves to victory. In Game 4, the Braves led 2-1 after five innings, but the Dodgers put up five unanswered runs across the sixth and seventh innings, capped off by a three-run home run from Manny Machado, to win and close out the series.

The Braves and Dodgers would face each other two more times in the postseason — in the NLCS in 2020 and 2021, with the Dodgers winning the former, and the Braves winning the latter, with both teams going on to win the World Series.

== American League Championship Series ==
=== (1) Boston Red Sox vs. (2) Houston Astros ===
Boston won the series, 4–1.

Game	Date	Score	Location	Time	Attendance
1	October 13	Houston Astros – 7, Boston Red Sox – 2	Fenway Park	4:03	38,007
2	October 14	Houston Astros – 5, Boston Red Sox – 7	Fenway Park	3:45	37,960
3	October 16	Boston Red Sox – 8, Houston Astros – 2	Minute Maid Park	3:52	43,102
4	October 17	Boston Red Sox – 8, Houston Astros – 6	Minute Maid Park	4:33	43,277
5	October 18	Boston Red Sox – 4, Houston Astros – 1	Minute Maid Park	3:32	43,210

This was the second postseason meeting between the Astros and Red Sox. The Red Sox defeated the defending World Series champion Astros in five games and returned to the World Series for the first time since 2013.

Justin Verlander pitched six solid innings as the Astros blew out the Red Sox on the road in Game 1. The Red Sox prevailed in a Game 2 slugfest to even the series headed to Houston. In Game 3, with the score tied after five innings, Steve Pearce hit a solo homer in the top of the sixth to put the Red Sox in the lead for good as they blew out the Astros to take the series lead. Game 4 was yet another slugfest that was won by the Red Sox thanks to a two-run homer from Jackie Bradley Jr. that put them in the lead for good in the top of the sixth. David Price pitched six innings of shutout ball in Game 5 as the Red Sox won to secure the pennant.

The Astros would return to the ALCS the next year, and defeated the New York Yankees in six games before falling in the World Series.

As of 2026, this is the last time the Red Sox won the AL pennant. The Red Sox and Astros would meet again in the ALCS in 2021, in which the Astros returned the favor and defeated the Red Sox in six games before falling in the World Series again that year.

== National League Championship Series ==
=== (1) Milwaukee Brewers vs. (2) Los Angeles Dodgers ===
Los Angeles won the series, 4–3.

Game	Date	Score	Location	Time	Attendance
1	October 12	Los Angeles Dodgers – 5, Milwaukee Brewers – 6	Miller Park	4:02	43,615
2	October 13	Los Angeles Dodgers – 4, Milwaukee Brewers – 3	Miller Park	3:31	43,905
3	October 15	Milwaukee Brewers – 4, Los Angeles Dodgers – 0	Dodger Stadium	3:25	52,793
4	October 16	Milwaukee Brewers – 1, Los Angeles Dodgers – 2 (13)	Dodger Stadium	5:15	53,764
5	October 17	Milwaukee Brewers – 2, Los Angeles Dodgers – 5	Dodger Stadium	3:35	54,502
6	October 19	Los Angeles Dodgers – 2, Milwaukee Brewers – 7	Miller Park	3:34	43,619
7	October 20	Los Angeles Dodgers – 5, Milwaukee Brewers – 1	Miller Park	3:15	44,097

This was the first postseason meeting between the Brewers and Dodgers. The Dodgers narrowly defeated the Brewers in seven games to return to the World Series for the second year in a row.

The Brewers prevailed in a Game 1 slugfest thanks to Corey Knebel, who stopped a late rally by the Dodgers in the top of the ninth. In Game 2, the Brewers led 3-0 after the sixth inning, but the Dodgers put up four unanswered runs across the seventh and eighth to even the series headed to Los Angeles. In Game 3, Jhoulys Chacín and the Brewers bullpen pitched a shutout as they retook the series lead. Game 4 was a long and grueling extra inning battle that was won by the Dodgers in the bottom of the thirteenth thanks to a walk-off RBI single from Cody Bellinger which scored Manny Machado. Game 4 lasted 5 hours and 15 minutes, making it the second longest NLCS game behind only Game 5 of the 1999 NLCS, which lasted 5 hours and 46 minutes. In Game 5, Clayton Kershaw pitched seven solid innings as the Dodgers took a 3–2 series lead headed back to Milwaukee. In Game 6, the Brewers blew out the Dodgers to force a seventh game. In Game 7, the Brewers struck first with a solo homer by Christian Yelich in the bottom of the first, but then Cody Bellinger answered back with a two-run homer in the top of the second that put the Dodgers in the lead for good, and then the Dodgers put up three more unanswered insurance runs in the top of the sixth off a three-run homer by Yasiel Puig to secure their second straight pennant.

The Brewers' Erik Kratz accused the Dodgers of using a video camera to steal signs. An anonymous source reported to The Athletic that "They use video people to get sequences", and that "It's known throughout the league. MLB knows it's an issue." Kratz also pointed to a moment in the sixth inning of Game 5 when he saw Manny Machado motioning toward Chris Taylor, who was at the plate in what he thought was an attempt to inform him of the upcoming pitch.

Both teams would meet again in the Wild Card round in 2020, and the NLCS again in 2025 and 2026, with the Dodgers winning the former two en route to two World Series titles, and the Brewers winning the latter en route to a World Series title.

== 2018 World Series ==
=== (AL1) Boston Red Sox vs. (NL2) Los Angeles Dodgers ===
Boston won the series, 4–1.

Game	Date	Score	Location	Time	Attendance
1	October 23	Los Angeles Dodgers – 4, Boston Red Sox – 8	Fenway Park	3:52	38,454
2	October 24	Los Angeles Dodgers – 2, Boston Red Sox – 4	Fenway Park	3:12	38,644
3	October 26	Boston Red Sox – 2, Los Angeles Dodgers – 3 (18)	Dodger Stadium	7:20	53,114
4	October 27	Boston Red Sox − 9, Los Angeles Dodgers − 6	Dodger Stadium	3:57	54,400
5	October 28	Boston Red Sox – 5, Los Angeles Dodgers – 1	Dodger Stadium	3:00	54,367

This was a rematch of the 1916 World Series, which the Red Sox won in five games. It was also the twelfth meeting between teams from Boston and Los Angeles for a major professional sports championship. This previously occurred in eleven NBA Finals between both cities’ NBA teams in the Lakers and Celtics. Like in 1916, history again repeated itself, and the Red Sox defeated the Dodgers in five quick games to win their ninth World Series title in franchise history, tying the Oakland Athletics for the third most World Series wins.

The Red Sox took care of business at home in Game 1. In Game 2, David Price outdueled Los Angeles’ Hyun-jin Ryu as the Red Sox won 4-2 to take a 2-0 series lead heading to Los Angeles. This series was known for its Game 3, which the Dodgers won after eighteen innings of play, 3–2. Game 3 became the longest World Series game ever played, and was longer than the entirety of the 1939 World Series. Game 4 was an offensive slugfest that was won by the Red Sox as Mitch Moreland and Steve Pearce hit home runs late to give Boston the win and a commanding 3-1 series lead. The Red Sox clinched the title in Game 5 as Price outdueled Clayton Kershaw in another pitcher’s duel.

Like the Astros in the 2017 World Series, the Red Sox after winning this World Series were then marred by a scandal. On January 7, 2020, the Red Sox were implicated in the same illegal sign stealing scandal as the Astros (the team had previously been fined in 2017 for illegal sign stealing) after three unnamed team members told The Athletic that the Red Sox had used their replay room to illegally steal signs of opposing teams during the 2018 season. On January 13, 2020, MLB Commissioner Rob Manfred stated that he would determine the appropriate punishment for Red Sox manager Alex Cora, who was also implicated in the Astros scandal, when the investigation was completed. The next day, Cora and the Red Sox mutually agreed to part ways and it was announced he would be suspended for the full season. A few days after his season long suspension ended, Cora was re-hired by the team. As a result of the investigation, the Red Sox were punished with the loss of a second-round draft pick in the 2020 MLB draft. In 2023, sportswriter Evan Drellich uncovered allegations from sources in the Dodgers organization that the Dodgers allegedly took part in the same illegal sign-stealing as the Astros and Red Sox during this World Series, however no conclusive evidence has surfaced.

As of 2026, this is the last time the Dodgers lost in the World Series. They would return to the Fall Classic in 2020, which they won in six games over the Tampa Bay Rays, marking the start of a dynasty for the team.

== Broadcasting ==
This was fifth year of eight-year U.S. TV contracts with ESPN, Fox Sports, and TBS. ESPN aired the National League Wild Card Game, Fox Sports 1 and MLB Network split the National League Division Series, and the Fox broadcast network and Fox Sports 1 split the National League Championship Series. TBS had the American League Wild Card Game, Division Series, and Championship Series, with sister network TNT used as an overflow channel. The World Series then aired on the Fox broadcast network for the nineteenth consecutive year.
