= Drew Butera =

American baseball player (born 1983)

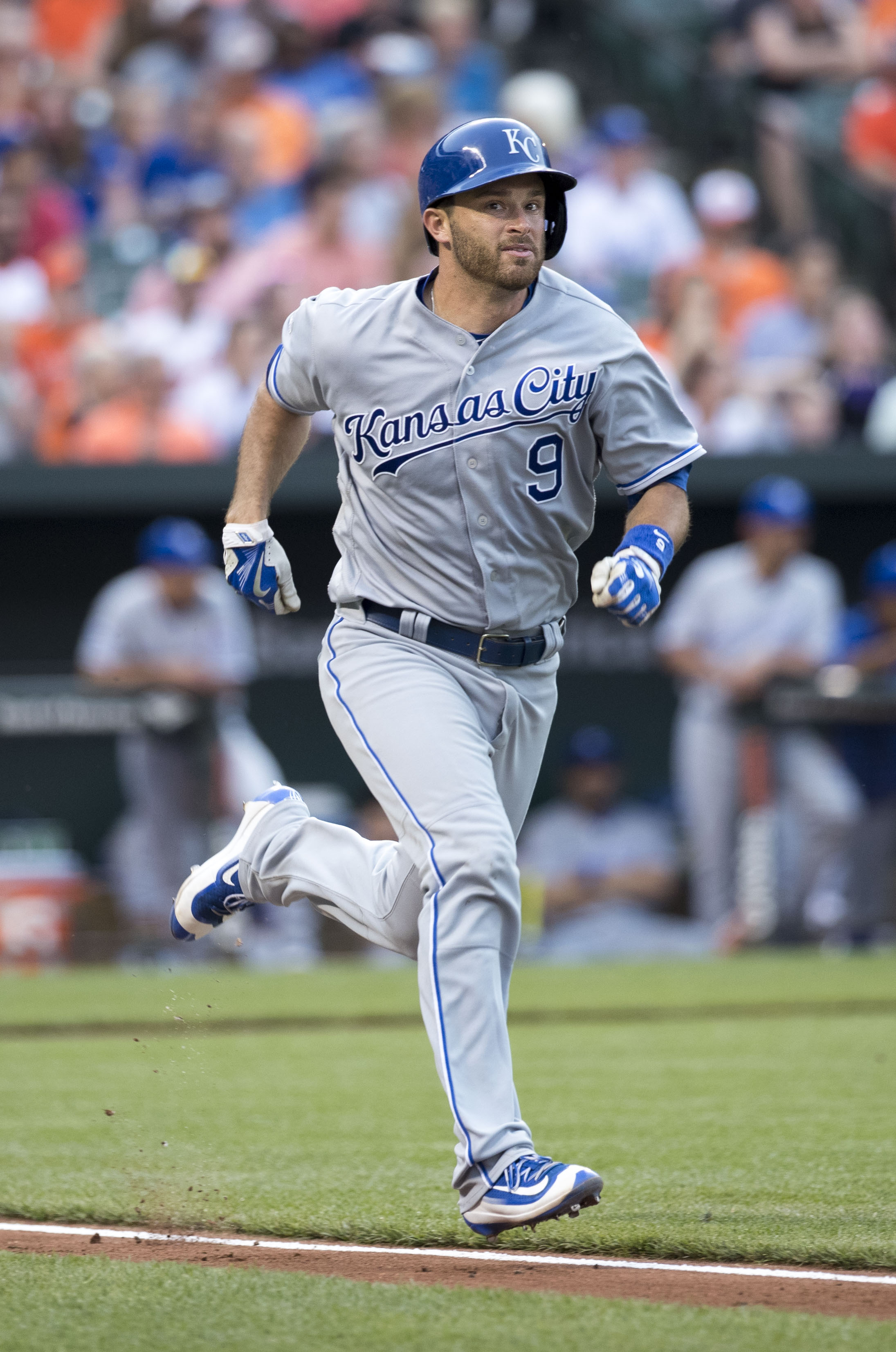
- Butera with the Kansas City Royals in 2016

Toronto Blue Jays – No. 83
- Catcher
- Born: August 9, 1983 (age 43); Evansville, Indiana, U.S.
- Batted: Right Threw: Right

MLB debut
- April 9, 2010, for the Minnesota Twins

Last MLB appearance
- May 27, 2021, for the Los Angeles Angels

MLB statistics
- Batting average: .196
- Home runs: 19
- Runs batted in: 123
- Stats at Baseball Reference

Teams
- As player: Minnesota Twins (2010–2013); Los Angeles Dodgers (2013–2014); Los Angeles Angels of Anaheim (2015); Kansas City Royals (2015–2018); Colorado Rockies (2018–2020); Los Angeles Angels (2021); As coach: Los Angeles Angels (2022–2023); Chicago White Sox (2024–2025); Toronto Blue Jays (2026–present)

Career highlights and awards
- World Series champion (2015)

Andrew Edward Butera (/bjʊˈtɛərə/; born August 9, 1983) is an American former professional baseball catcher who currently serves as a major league coach for the Toronto Blue Jays of Major League Baseball (MLB). He played in MLB for the Minnesota Twins, Los Angeles Dodgers, Los Angeles Angels, Kansas City Royals, and Colorado Rockies.

The 6 feet 1 inch (1.85 m), 210 pounds (95 kg) right-hander is the son of former major league catcher Sal Butera. Butera became the fifth catcher to catch a no-hitter in both the American League (Francisco Liriano, 2011) and National League (Josh Beckett, 2014).

Butera has also pitched scoreless innings in both leagues, with a fastball reaching the mid-90s. In 2020, he became the first position player ever to pitch a scoreless ninth inning after the other team had scored in each of the first eight innings.

== Amateur career ==
Butera played baseball and golf at Bishop Moore High School in Orlando, Florida, graduating in 2002. He was selected by the Toronto Blue Jays in the 48th round of the 2002 Major League Baseball draft but opted instead to attend the University of Central Florida (UCF). In 2004, he played collegiate summer baseball for the Orleans Cardinals of the Cape Cod Baseball League. In 2019, he was inducted into the UCF athletics hall of fame.

== Professional career ==
=== New York Mets ===
Butera was selected by the New York Mets in the 5th round of the 2005 MLB draft. He signed with the Mets and made his professional debut that summer with the Low-A Brooklyn Cyclones. In 2006, he played for the Single-A Hagerstown Suns, slashing .186/.297/.281 with 5 home runs and 38 RBI.

In 2007, Butera batted .258/.348/.418 with five home runs and 22 runs batted in for the St. Lucie Mets and was named a Florida State League All-Star. Following the All-Star game, Butera was promoted to the Double-A Binghamton Mets.

=== Minnesota Twins ===
The Mets traded Butera and Dustin Martin on July 30, 2007 to the Minnesota Twins for second baseman Luis Castillo. After the trade, Butera finished the year with the Double-A New Britain Rock Cats. He remained in New Britain for the 2008 season, and posted a .219/.308/.354 batting line with 7 home runs and 39 RBI. On November 19, 2008, he was added to the Twins' 40-man roster.

After playing winter ball with Lobos de Arecibo of the Liga de Beisbol Profesional de Puerto Rico, Butera made the Twins out of spring training in 2010. He made his major league debut on April 9, 2010, against the Chicago White Sox, and got his first major league hit against the Cleveland Indians on April 22. He hit his first career MLB home run in a 13–10 11-inning win against the Philadelphia Phillies on June 19. As the Twins backup catcher, he appeared in 49 games in 2010, hitting .197/.237/.296 with 2 home runs and 13 RBIs in 155 plate appearances.

On May 3, 2011, Butera caught Francisco Liriano's no-hitter. In 2011 with the Twins, he batted .167/.210/.239 with two home runs and 23 RBIs in 254 plate appearances.

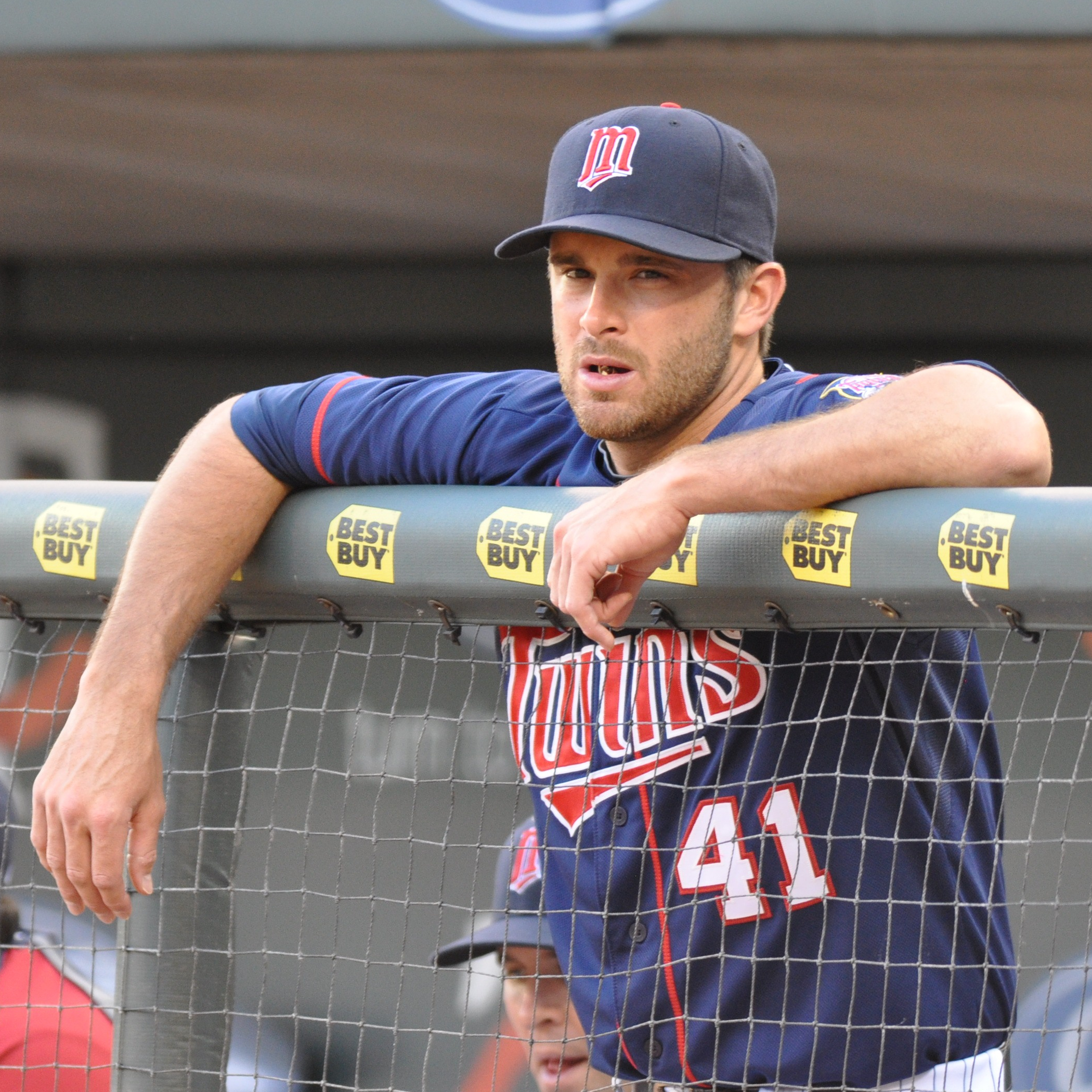
Butera with the Twins in 2012

Butera began 2012 with the Triple-A Rochester Red Wings. After hitting .279 in 15 games with 1 home run and 5 RBI, he was called up to the Twins in May. On May 20, 2012, Butera pitched the eighth inning of the Twins 16–4 loss to the Milwaukee Brewers. Butera pitched a scoreless inning, issuing a walk and striking out Carlos Gómez. He threw a fastball and a changeup. In 2012 for the Twins, he batted .198/.270/.279 with one home runs and 5 RBIs in 111 at bats.

After playing the 2013 World Baseball Classic for Italy, Butera only appeared in two games for the Twins, spending most of his time with Rochester, where he hit .229 in 26 games.

=== Los Angeles Dodgers ===
On July 31, 2013, Butera was traded to the Los Angeles Dodgers for a player to be named later. He was then optioned to the Triple-A Albuquerque Isotopes. In 16 games with the Isotopes, he hit .135. The Dodgers called him up on September 1. He appeared in five games for the Dodgers and had one hit in seven at bats.

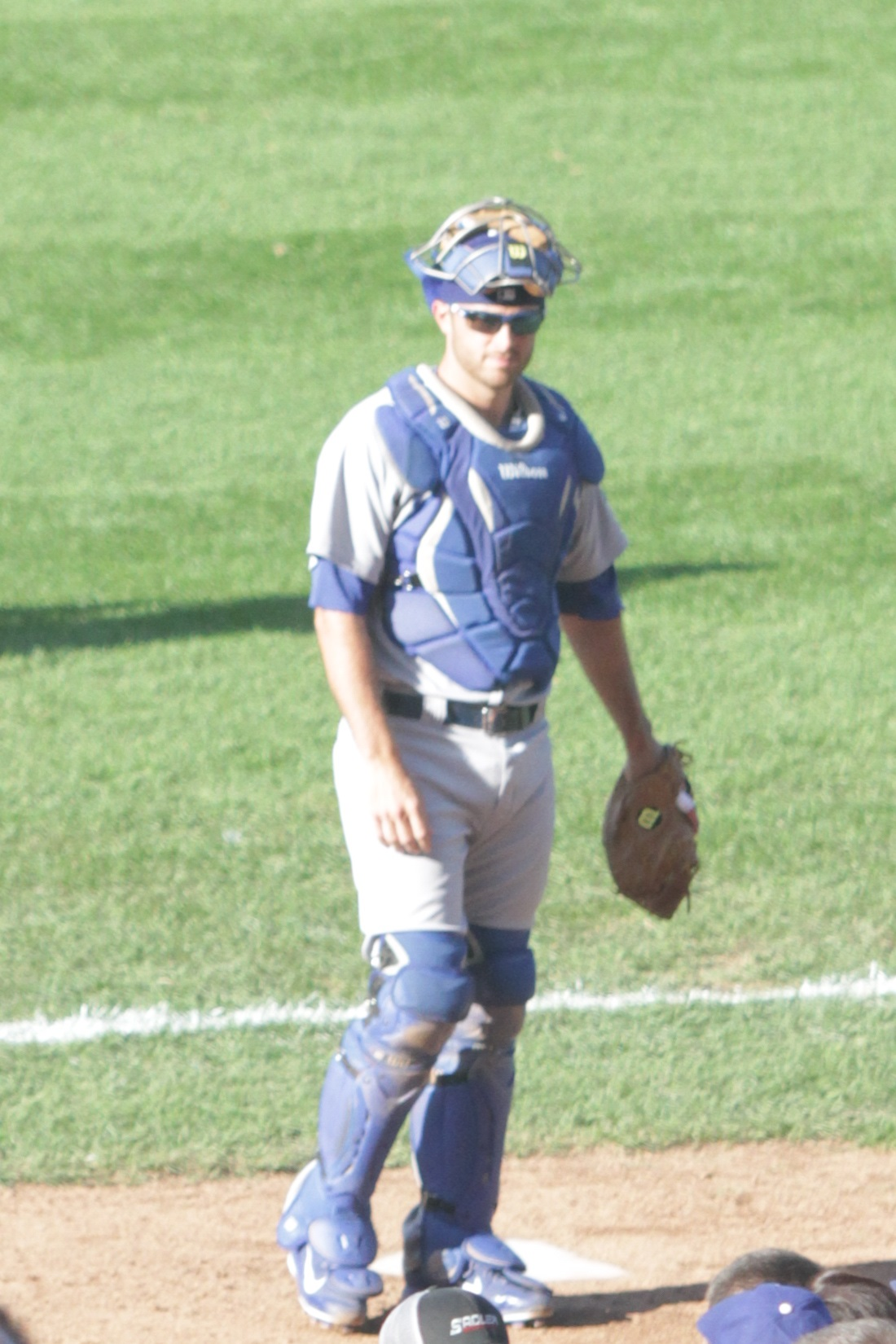
Butera for the Los Angeles Dodgers in 2014

On May 15, 2014, in a 13–3 blowout loss to the Miami Marlins, Butera pitched a scoreless 9th inning, with his fastball reaching the mid-90s on the radar gun. On May 25, 2014, Butera caught Josh Beckett's no-hitter, becoming only the fifth catcher to catch a no-hitter in the American League and National League. He was the Dodgers' backup catcher all season and hit .188/.267/.288 in 192 plate appearances in 61 games, with three home runs and 14 RBIs. The Dodgers designated him for assignment on December 5.

=== Los Angeles Angels of Anaheim ===
On December 9, 2014 the Dodgers traded Butera to the Los Angeles Angels of Anaheim for a player to be named later or cash considerations. The Angels sent minor leaguer Matt Long to the Dodgers on December 18 to complete the trade. Butera batted 4-for-21 for the Angels to start the 2015 season. On May 4, Butera was designated for assignment.

=== Kansas City Royals ===
Butera was traded on May 7, 2015, to the Kansas City Royals in exchange for Ryan Jackson.

Butera spent the latter part of the 2015 campaign as the backup for All-Star catcher Salvador Pérez. In 2015 for the Royals, he batted .198/.266/.267 with one home run and five RBIs in 99 plate appearances. Butera played a role in the 8th-inning comeback in Game 4 of the 2015 ALDS against the Houston Astros, with the Royals down two games to one and facing elimination. Butera entered the game after Perez was lifted for a pinch-runner. Beginning the 8th inning down 6–2, the game was tied at 6 when Butera came to the plate. He drew a 10-pitch walk with one out to load the bases, enabling the following batter, Alex Gordon, to hit an RBI grounder to drive in the game-winning run. In the deciding Game 5 of the 2015 World Series, Perez hit a single in the top of the 12th inning and was replaced by pinch runner Jarrod Dyson, who came around to score the game-winning run. Butera then entered as a defensive replacement in the bottom of the 12th inning and caught the season-ending strikeout from closer Wade Davis to clinch the Royals' championship.

In 2016, Butera pitched in two games, both blowout losses. On June 25, Butera pitched in the 9th inning, facing four batters, striking out one, and giving up no runs in a 13–5 loss to the Astros. On July 26, Butera pitched the final out of the top of the 9th inning, facing only Johnny Giavotella who grounded out in a 13–0 loss to the Angels. In 2016 with the Royals, Butera batted .285/.328/.480 with 4 home runs and 16 RBIs in 133 plate appearances. He had the second strongest throwing arm among MLB catchers, trailing only Christian Bethancourt.

In 2017 for the Royals, he batted .227/.284/.319 with 3 home runs and 14 RBIs in 177 plate appearances. In the first five months of the 2018 season, he batted .188/.259/.289 with 2 home runs and 18 RBIs in 166 plate appearances for the Royals.

=== Colorado Rockies ===
On August 31, 2018, Butera was traded to the Colorado Rockies in exchange for pitcher Jerry Vasto. Butera hit 3-for-14 for the Rockies in September 2018. He was a defensive substitute in the Wild Card Game, drawing one walk in three plate appearances and committing catcher interference during a Tommy La Stella plate appearance.

Butera elected free agency on October 29, 2018.

=== Philadelphia Phillies ===
On February 5, 2019, Butera signed a minor league contract with the Philadelphia Phillies with an invitation to spring training. If added to the team's 40-man roster, he would have received $1.3 million while in the majors and $210,000 while in the minors. The contract allowed Butera to opt out by March 21. Butera later exercised this opt-out clause, granting him his release.

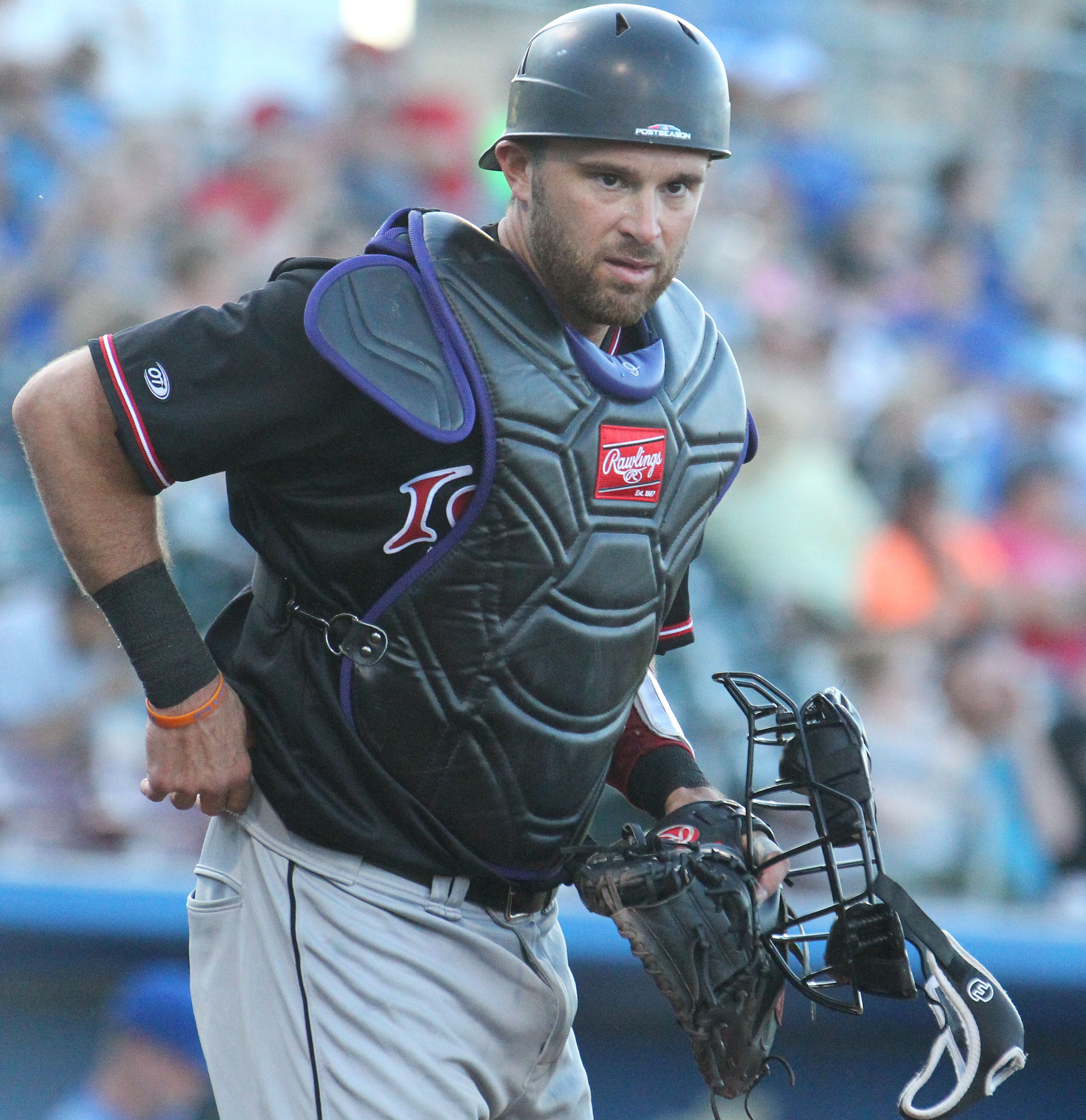
Butera with the Albuquerque Isotopes in 2019

=== Colorado Rockies (second stint) ===
On March 25, 2019, Butera signed a minor league contract with the Rockies. Butera had his contract selected on April 15. Butera was designated for assignment on May 3 and outrighted on May 7. On September 3, the Rockies selected his contract to the active roster. In 2019 with Colorado, Butera batted .163/.229/.233 with no homers and 3 RBI. He became a free agent after the season but re-signed with the Rockies on another minor league contract on December 18.

Butera had his contract selected to the Rockies roster on July 22, 2020, before the start of the shortened 2020 season. In 2020 with the Rockies, Butera slashed .154/.190/.205 with no home runs and 4 RBI. He was frequently a defensive replacement, coming to bat only 43 times in 28 games. He became a free agent after the season.

=== Texas Rangers ===
On January 12, 2021, Butera signed a minor league contract with the Texas Rangers organization. On March 27, 2021, Butera was released, but re-signed with the Rangers on a new minor league contract the same day.

=== Los Angeles Angels (second stint) ===
On May 7, 2021, Butera was traded to the Los Angeles Angels in exchange for cash considerations and was selected to the 40-man roster. After hitting .094 in 12 games, Butera was designated for assignment by the Angels. He was outrighted to the Triple-A Salt Lake Bees on June 1. On August 31, Butera was released by the Angels.

=== Houston Astros ===
On August 31, 2021, Butera signed a minor league contract with the Houston Astros organization. He was assigned to the Sugar Land Skeeters, where he played the final 15 games of his professional career. He elected free agency on November 7.

== International career ==
Butera played for the Italian national baseball team in the 2013 World Baseball Classic (WBC) and 2017 WBC. His grandmother was born in Italy. His father Sal was a coach for the Italian team in 2017.

Butera was 3-for-16 with a home run and double in the 2013 WBC. He hit two solo home runs four games in the 2017 tournament, tied for the 8th most home runs in the tournament.

== Coaching career ==
=== Los Angeles Angels ===
On April 5, 2022, Butera retired from playing and joined the Los Angeles Angels as the team's bullpen coach.

=== Chicago White Sox ===
On November 7, 2023, the Chicago White Sox announced Butera as the team's catching coach. He remained with the White Sox headed into 2025 after the club's historically poor record and change in managers. He was let go by the White Sox following the 2025 season.

=== Toronto Blue Jays ===
On December 10, 2025, Butera was hired to serve as a major league coach for the Toronto Blue Jays.

== See also ==
- List of second-generation Major League Baseball players
