= Tyler Anderson =

American baseball player (born 1989)

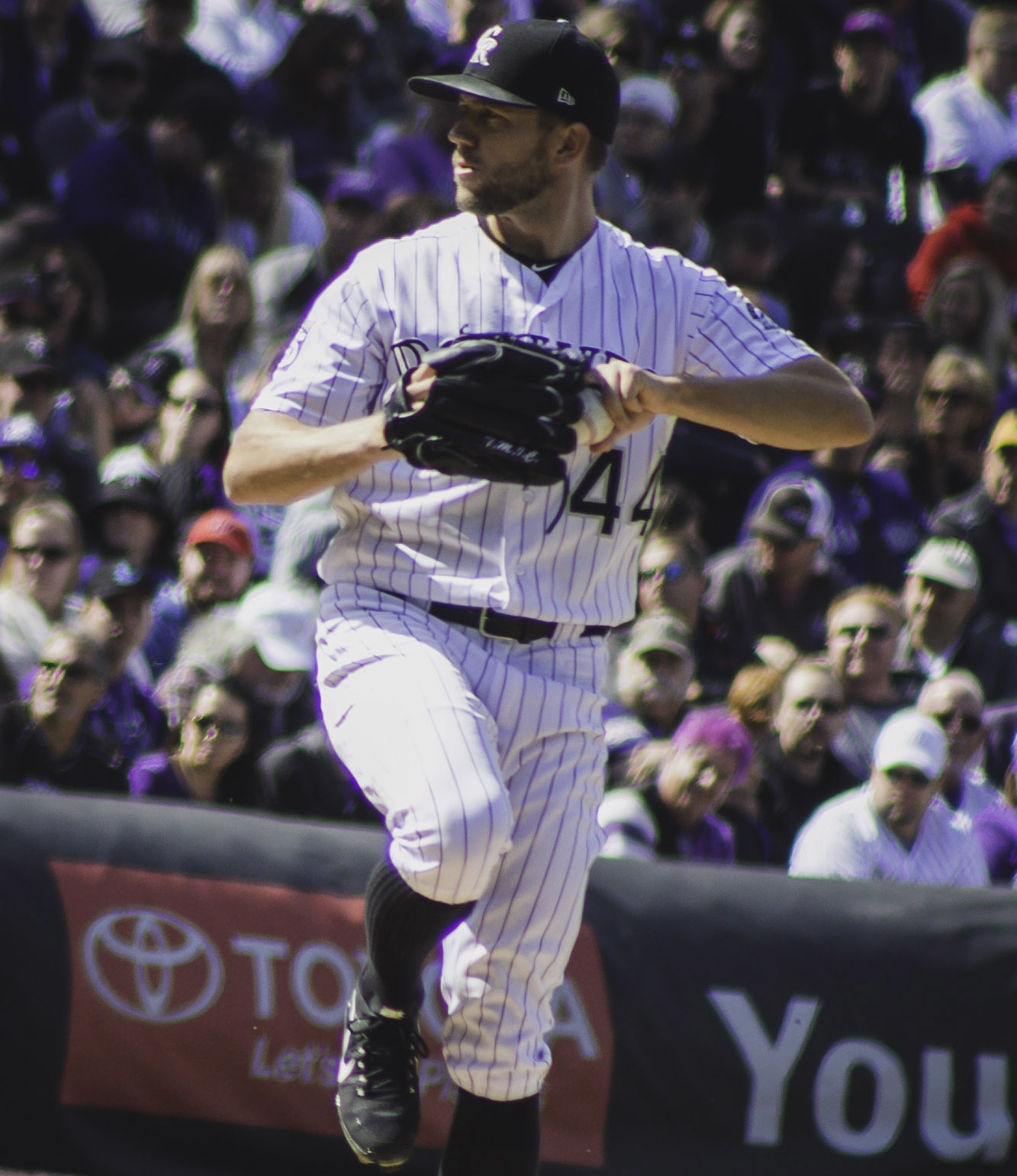
- Anderson with the Colorado Rockies in 2018

Free agent
- Pitcher
- Born: December 30, 1989 (age 36); Las Vegas, Nevada, U.S.
- Bats: Left Throws: Left

MLB debut
- June 12, 2016, for the Colorado Rockies

MLB statistics (through 2025 season)
- Win–loss record: 62–72
- Earned run average: 4.30
- Strikeouts: 1,045
- Stats at Baseball Reference

Teams
- Colorado Rockies (2016–2019); San Francisco Giants (2020); Pittsburgh Pirates (2021); Seattle Mariners (2021); Los Angeles Dodgers (2022); Los Angeles Angels (2023–2025)

Career highlights and awards
- 2× All-Star (2022, 2024)

Tyler John Anderson (born December 30, 1989) is an American professional baseball pitcher who is a free agent. He has previously played in Major League Baseball (MLB) for the Colorado Rockies, San Francisco Giants, Pittsburgh Pirates, Seattle Mariners, Los Angeles Dodgers, and Los Angeles Angels. He played college baseball for the University of Oregon. The Rockies selected Anderson in the first round, with the 20th overall selection, of the 2011 MLB draft. He made his MLB debut in 2016. He is a two-time All-Star.

== Amateur career ==
Anderson attended Spring Valley High School in Las Vegas, Nevada, where he played four seasons of varsity baseball. While serving as the assistant coach for the Oregon Ducks baseball team, Andrew Checketts discovered Anderson while pitching against a rival high school. The Minnesota Twins selected Anderson in the 50th round of the 2008 Major League Baseball draft, but he did not sign.

Anderson enrolled at the University of Oregon as a political science major and played college baseball for the Oregon Ducks in the Pac-10 Conference. In 2010, his sophomore year, he was named to the Pac-10 All-Conference Team with a 2.98 earned run average (ERA) (fifth-best in the Pac-10), and his 105 strikeouts were a new Oregon single-season record and ranked sixth in the Pac-10. In 2011, Anderson's junior year, Louisville Slugger named Anderson a Second Team All-American and he was named to the Pac-10 All-Conference Team, after he had an 8–3 record and set two Oregon single-season records. pitching 107.2 innings while striking out 114 batters (5th Pac-12), with a 2.17 ERA (4th Pac-12) while holding opposing batters to a .201 batting average (fifth-best in the Pac-12). In three seasons, Anderson became the Ducks' all-time leader in strikeouts with 285.

== Professional career ==
=== Colorado Rockies ===
The Rockies selected Anderson in the first round, with the 20th overall selection, of the 2011 MLB draft, and he signed for a signing bonus of $1.4 million. He pitched for the Asheville Tourists of the Class A South Atlantic League (SAL) in 2012, and was named an SAL Post-Season All-Star. In 20 starts, he was 12–3 with a 2.47 ERA.

Prior to the 2013 season, MLB named him the sixth-best prospect in the Rockies system. He began the 2013 season with the Modesto Nuts of the Class A-Advanced California League, and also pitched for the Tri-City Dust Devils of the Class A-Short Season Northwest League, going 4–3 with a 2.81 ERA in 16 total starts between both teams. During the season, he suffered a stress fracture in his elbow, and the Rockies had him on a strict pitch limit in 2014. Anderson pitched for the Tulsa Drillers of the Class AA Texas League in 2014, Anderson had a 7–4 record with a 2.08 ERA and 100 strikeouts in 112 1/3 innings pitched (23 starts), and was named the Texas League Pitcher of the Year. He was added to the Rockies' 40-man roster on November 20, 2014.

The stress fracture in Anderson's elbow prevented him from participating in spring training in 2015, and he also missed the rest of the season. He began the 2016 season with the Hartford Yard Goats of the Class AA Eastern League and was promoted to the Albuquerque Isotopes of the Class AAA Pacific Coast League in late May.

On June 11, 2016, the Rockies called up Anderson and placed Jake McGee on the disabled list. Anderson made his MLB debut the following day, allowing only one run in 6 1/3 innings against the San Diego Padres. His first major league strikeout was against Wil Myers. He spent the remainder of the season with the Rockies, going 5–6 with a 3.54 ERA in 19 starts. In 2017, Anderson's first full season in the major leagues, he was 6–6 with a 4.81 ERA in 17 games (15 starts). He missed the last three months of the season due to left knee inflammation that required arthroscopic surgery. In 2018 he was 7–9 with a 4.55 ERA in 32 starts in which he pitched 176 innings. He led the major leagues in home runs allowed with 30.

Anderson began the 2019 season in the Rockies rotation but was quickly placed on the disabled list with knee inflammation. He came off the disabled list a week later and made five starts before being demoted to AAA. He was placed on the disabled list after the demotion due to continued knee discomfort. On June 11 he underwent major season-ending surgery for to correct a chondral defect (an area of damage to the cartilage that lines the end of the bones in the knee) in his left knee, which was expected to require a lengthy recovery time. In 2019 with the Rockies he was 0–3 with an 11.76 ERA in five starts covering 20 2/3 innings in which he struck out 23 batters.

=== San Francisco Giants ===
On October 30, 2019, Anderson was claimed off waivers by the San Francisco Giants. On December 2, Anderson was non-tendered and became a free agent. The following day, on December 3, Anderson re-signed with the Giants on a one-year major league contract. The contract called for a $1.775 million salary plus $500,000 in possible roster bonuses and $350,000 in possible performance bonuses based on number of innings pitched. Anderson threw the first complete game of his career on August 22, 2020, in a 5–1 win over the Arizona Diamondbacks. He finished the season with a 4–3 record and a 4.37 ERA over 59 2/3 innings in 13 games (11 starts).

=== Pittsburgh Pirates ===
Anderson signed a one-year, major league contract with the Pittsburgh Pirates for $2.5 million on February 17, 2021. In 18 starts for the Pirates, Anderson was 5–8 with a 4.35 ERA and had 86 strikeouts.

=== Seattle Mariners ===
On July 27, 2021, Anderson was reportedly going to be traded to the Philadelphia Phillies in exchange for minor league prospects Cristian Hernandez and Abrahan Gutierrez. However, concerns about Hernandez's medical evaluation caused the deal to fall through, and the Pirates traded Anderson to the Seattle Mariners in exchange for Carter Bins and Joaquin Tejada the next day. He was 2–3 with a 4.81 ERA in 13 starts for the Mariners.

=== Los Angeles Dodgers ===
On March 18, 2022, Anderson signed a one-year contract for $8 million with the Los Angeles Dodgers. He made his first appearance in relief on April 9 against his first team, the Colorado Rockies. After beginning the season in the bullpen, Anderson moved into the starting rotation when Andrew Heaney went down with an arm injury. On June 15, Anderson lost a no-hitter against the Los Angeles Angels, when Shohei Ohtani broke it up with a one-out triple in the ninth inning. After starting the season 10–1 with a 2.96 ERA, he was selected for the 2022 Major League Baseball All-Star Game, though he did not appear in the game.

Anderson finished the season with career-best numbers in wins and earned run average, posting a 15–5 record and a 2.57 ERA. He made 28 starts (and two relief appearances) and struck out 138 batters. He was a finalist for the NL Gold Glove Award at pitcher, but it was won for the third straight season by Max Fried.

=== Los Angeles Angels ===
On November 16, 2022, Anderson signed a three-year, $39 million contract with the Los Angeles Angels. In three seasons with the Angels, Anderson pitched in 84 games (82 starts) and had an 18–29 record with 4.53 ERA in 456 2/3 innings pitched. He was named an all-star for the Angels in 2024.
