= Jerry Vasto =

American baseball player (born 1992)

- Pitcher
- Born: February 12, 1992 (age 34); Atlantic Highlands, New Jersey, U.S.
- Batted: Left Threw: Left

MLB debut
- June 10, 2018, for the Colorado Rockies

Last MLB appearance
- September 16, 2018, for the Kansas City Royals

MLB statistics
- Win–loss record: 0–1
- Earned run average: 8.31
- Strikeouts: 4
- Stats at Baseball Reference

Teams
- Colorado Rockies (2018); Kansas City Royals (2018)

Gerard Joseph Vasto (born February 12, 1992) is an American former professional baseball pitcher. He played in Major League Baseball (MLB) for the Colorado Rockies and Kansas City Royals.

== Early career ==
A native of Atlantic Highlands, New Jersey, Vasto attended Henry Hudson Regional High School where he played baseball. After graduating, Vasto played collegiate baseball at Felician University, the only college to offer him a scholarship.

== Career ==
=== Colorado Rockies ===
Vasto was selected by the Colorado Rockies in the 24th round of the 2014 Major League Baseball draft, and he signed. He made his professional debut that same year with the Tri-City Dust Devils, pitching one scoreless inning and compiling one strikeout. In 2015, he made 46 relief appearances for the Asheville Tourists where he was 2-4 with a 2.93 earned run average, and held opponents to a .199 average. This season also helped him earn his first Minor League All Star Appearance. In 2016, he was called up to play with the Modesto Nuts and Hartford Yard Goats. In 56 relief appearance, Jerry compiled a combined 4-4 record with 70 strikeouts and a 2.26 earned run average and earned his second Minor League All Star appearance. Jerry was invited to participate in the Arizona Fall League for the 2016 season, where he struggled and had an earned run average of 8.31 in 8 2/3 innings pitched. Vasto was called up and spent 2017 with the Albuquerque Isotopes, where at one point in the season he had major success and ranked #30 in the Rockies top prospects list. However, due to injuries and major second half struggles, his stats declined and he pitched to a 3-3 record, a 6.88 earned run average, and a 1.68 walks plus hits divided by innings pitched in 53.2 relief innings. He began 2018 with the Albuquerque Isotopes, where he improved tremendously and compiled a 3.16 earned run average with 44 strikeouts in 37 relief appearances.

==== Major league career ====
Vasto was called up to the majors for the first time on June 10, 2018, and he made his major league debut that same day against the Arizona Diamondbacks. Jerry recorded his first major league strikeout against the Arizona Diamondbacks outfielder Jon Jay, but overall struggled in his debut as he allowed 3 hits, 3 earned runs, and a walk in only 2/3 innings pitched. He was optioned back to Albuquerque on June 14.

=== Kansas City Royals ===
On August 31, 2018, Vasto was traded to the Kansas City Royals in exchange for catcher Drew Butera. Jerry made one appearance with the Omaha Storm Chasers before getting called up on September 4. He made his debut that same night and recorded his first Royals strikeout against Cleveland Indians outfielder Brandon Guyer. Jerry finished his 2018 Royals season with three strikeouts and a 2.45 earned run average in 3 2/3 innings pitched. Vasto finished his first major league season with four strikeouts and an 8.31 earned run average in 4 1/3 innings pitched.

=== Chicago Cubs ===
On October 31, 2018, Vasto was claimed off waivers by the Chicago Cubs. On November 20, Vasto removed from the 40-man roster and sent outright to the Triple-A Iowa Cubs. Vasto missed the entire 2019 season due to an injury, and did not play in a game in 2020 due to the cancellation of the minor league season because of the COVID-19 pandemic. He became a free agent on November 2, 2020.

On November 16, 2020, Vasto re-signed with the Cubs on a minor league contract. On March 29, 2021, Vasto was released by the Cubs.
