= Harrison Musgrave =

American baseball player (born 1992)

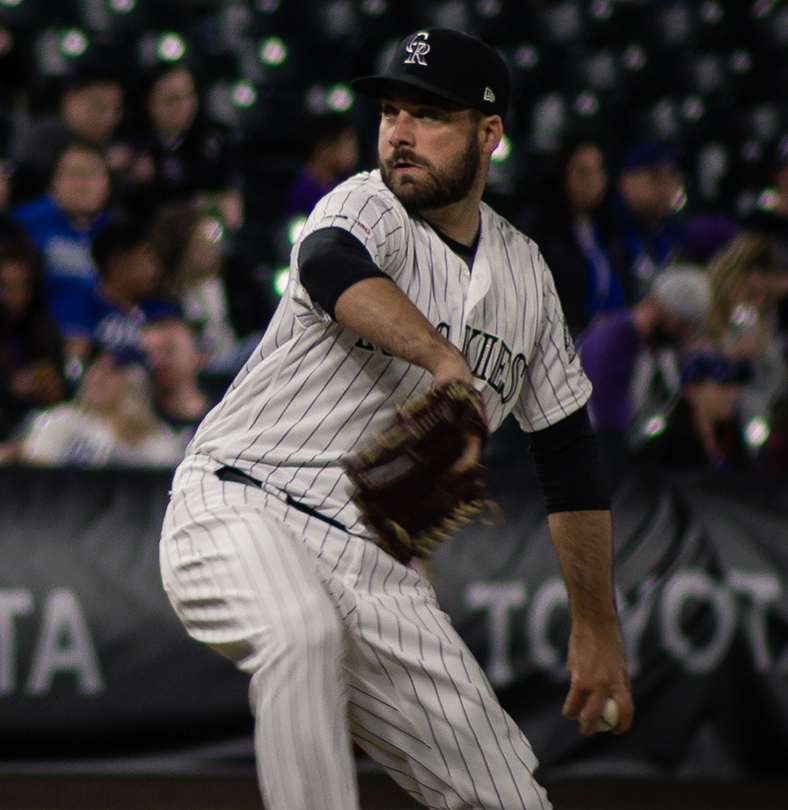
- Musgrave with the Colorado Rockies in 2019
- Pitcher
- Born: March 3, 1992 (age 33); Nutter Fort, West Virginia, U.S.
- Batted: Left Threw: Left

MLB debut
- April 23, 2018, for the Colorado Rockies

Last MLB appearance
- May 3, 2019, for the Colorado Rockies

MLB statistics
- Win–loss record: 2–3
- Earned run average: 4.45
- Strikeouts: 44
- Stats at Baseball Reference

Teams
- Colorado Rockies (2018–2019)

Career highlights and awards
- Big 12 Conference Baseball Pitcher of the Year (2013)

Harrison Scott Musgrave (born March 3, 1992) is an American former professional baseball pitcher. He played in Major League Baseball (MLB) for the Colorado Rockies. Before his professional career, he played college baseball for the West Virginia Mountaineers.

== Amateur career ==
Musgrave attended Bridgeport High School in Bridgeport, West Virginia, and West Virginia University, where he played college baseball for the West Virginia Mountaineers. In 2011, his freshman year at West Virginia, Musgrave underwent Tommy John surgery. In 2013, Musgrave had a 9–1 win–loss record, a 2.17 earned run average. He was named the Big 12 Conference Baseball Pitcher of the Year. The Philadelphia Phillies selected Musgrave in the 33rd round, with the 991st overall selection, of the 2013 MLB draft. He opted not to sign with the Phillies, and returned to West Virginia.

== Professional career ==
The Colorado Rockies drafted Musgrave in the eighth round, with the 233rd overall selection, of the 2014 Major League Baseball draft. He signed with the Rockies, and pitched that year for the Grand Junction Rockies of the Rookie-level Pioneer League, posting a 2–4 record with a 5.44 ERA and 50 strikeouts in 13 games.

Musgrave began the 2015 season with the Modesto Nuts of the High-A California League and was promoted to the New Britain Rock Cats of the Double-A Eastern League. In 27 total games between Modesto and New Britain, Musgrave went 13–5 with a 2.99 ERA and 136 strikeouts across 147 1/3 innings pitched. He started the 2016 season with the Double-A Hartford Yard Goats of the Eastern League, and was promoted during the season to the Albuquerque Isotopes of the Triple-A Pacific Coast League. Musgrave pitched to a combined 13–8 record with a 3.64 ERA with 109 strikeouts in 153 1/3 innings over 25 starts. He competed for a spot in the Rockies' starting rotation during spring training in 2017, but spent the season with Albuquerque where he went 3–1 with a 6.79 ERA and 39 strikeouts across 12 appearances.

In 2018, the Rockies assigned Musgrave to Albuquerque to begin the year. On April 23, 2018, Musgrave was selected to the 40-man roster and promoted to the major leagues for the first time. He made 35 appearances out of the bullpen for Colorado during his rookie campaign, posting a 2-3 record and 4.63 ERA with 32 strikeouts across 44 2/3 innings pitched.

Musgrave made 10 appearances for Colorado in 2019, recording a 3.60 ERA with 12 strikeouts over 10 innings of work. On May 4, 2019, Musgrave was placed on the injured list with a flexor strain in his pitching elbow. He was transferred to the 60-day injured list on June 7. Musgrave was activated on July 17, and subsequently optioned to Triple-A Albuquerque. He was designated for assignment following the acquisition of Joe Harvey on July 31. Musgrave cleared waivers and was sent outright to Albuquerque on August 3.

On March 9, 2020, Musgrave was released by the Rockies organization.
