= 2018 National League Wild Card Game =

	1	2	3	4	5	6	7	8	9	10	11	12	13	R	H	E
Colorado Rockies	1	0	0	0	0	0	0	0	0	0	0	0	1	2	11	1
Chicago Cubs	0	0	0	0	0	0	0	1	0	0	0	0	0	1	6	0
- Date: October 2, 2018
- Venue: Wrigley Field
- City: Chicago, Illinois
- Managers: Bud Black (Colorado Rockies); Joe Maddon (Chicago Cubs)
- Umpires: HP: Chris Guccione; 1B: Mark Wegner; 2B: Bill Miller (crew chief); 3B: James Hoye; LF: Tripp Gibson; RF: Gabe Morales
- Attendance: 40,151
- Television: ESPN; ESPN2 (Statcast Edition)
- TV announcers: Matt Vasgersian, Alex Rodriguez, Jessica Mendoza, and Buster Olney (ESPN); Jason Benetti, Eduardo Pérez, and Mike Petriello (ESPN2)
- Radio: ESPN
- Radio announcers: Dan Shulman and Chris Singleton

The 2018 National League Wild Card Game was a play-in game during Major League Baseball's (MLB) 2018 postseason between the National League's two wild card teams, the Colorado Rockies and the Chicago Cubs. The Cubs earned home field advantage by having a better regular season record. The game occurred on October 2, 2018, with the Rockies victorious by a score of 2–1 in 13 innings—the second-longest winner-take-all MLB postseason game. The Rockies advanced to face the Milwaukee Brewers in the National League Division Series.

== Background ==
At the scheduled end of the regular season, the NL Central and NL West divisions each had two teams tied for the division lead; Cubs and Brewers in the Central, and Dodgers and Rockies in the West. This resulted in two tiebreaker games being played on October 1 to determine division winners, with the losers of the tiebreaker games—the Rockies and Cubs—relegated to this Wild Card Game.

This was the first Wild Card Game to require tiebreakers to determine both teams, and the first NL Wild Card Game to require any tiebreaker game, as the only other Wild Card Game to require a tiebreaker was the 2013 AL Wild Card Game. The Cubs and Rockies became the first teams in MLB history to lose tiebreaker games at the end of the regular season yet still enter postseason play, as they played in the first divisional tie-breaker games needed since MLB's addition of a second Wild Card team in 2012.

The Cubs entered the Wild Card Game with a record of 95–68, while the Rockies entered at 91–72. The Cubs and Rockies tied the six-game regular season series 3–3, with each team winning two of the three games in its opponent's ballpark. This was the first postseason meeting between the two teams.

== Game results ==
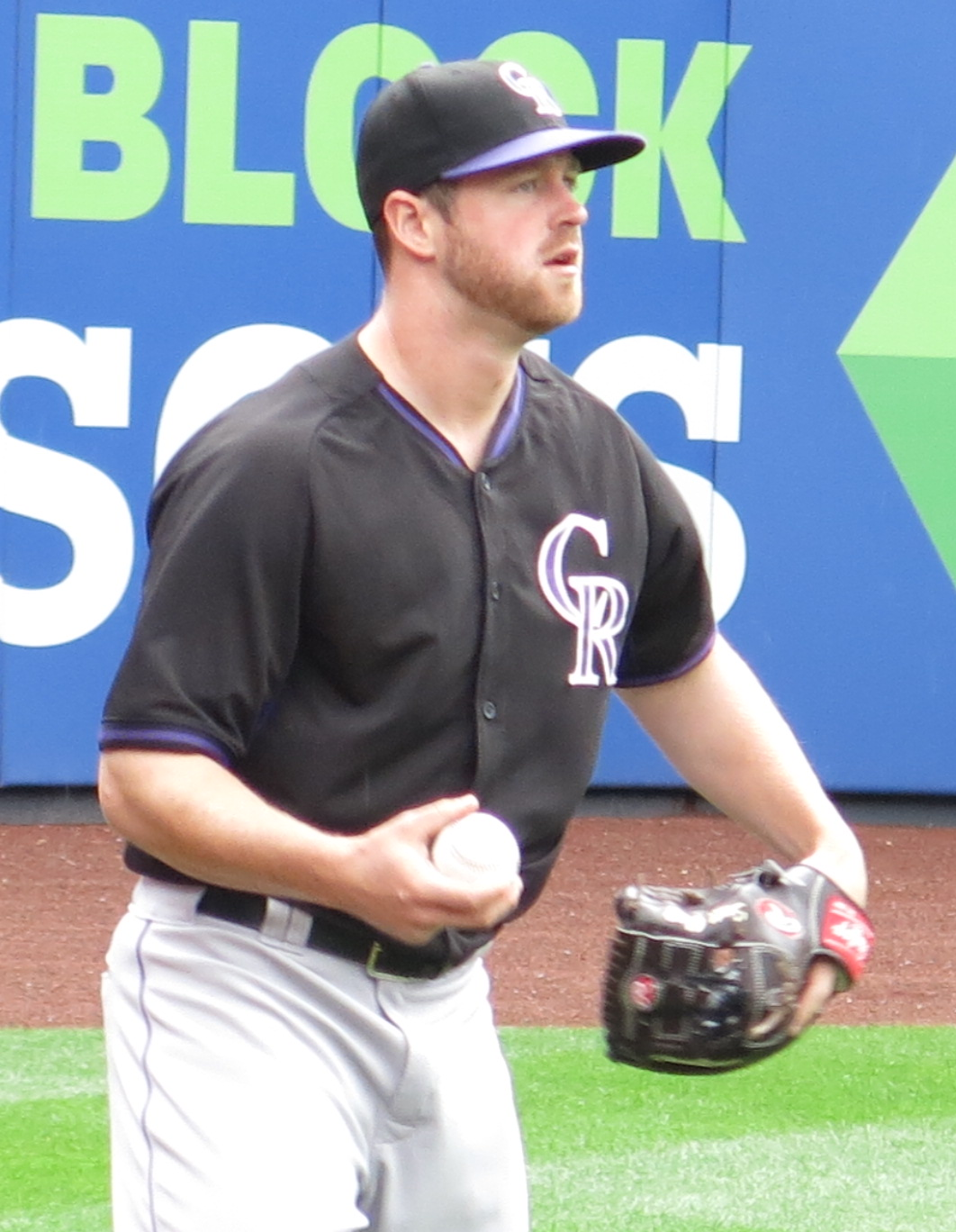
Scott Oberg of the Rockies was the winning pitcher.

=== Line score ===
October 2, 2018 7:08 pm (CDT) at Wrigley Field in Chicago, Illinois, 61 °F (16 °C), cloudy
Team	1	2	3	4	5	6	7	8	9	10	11	12	13	R	H	E
Colorado	1	0	0	0	0	0	0	0	0	0	0	0	1	2	11	1
Chicago	0	0	0	0	0	0	0	1	0	0	0	0	0	1	6	0
WP: Scott Oberg (1–0) LP: Kyle Hendricks (0–1); Attendance: 40,151; Boxscore

Charlie Blackmon walked to lead off the game for the Rockies and DJ LeMahieu followed with a double. They recorded their first run in the first inning when Nolan Arenado hit a sacrifice fly that scored Blackmon. In the eighth inning, Anthony Rizzo hit a single for the Cubs. Pinch runner Terrance Gore stole second base and scored on an RBI double by Javier Báez. Tony Wolters, who entered the game in the 12th inning in a double switch, had an RBI single for Colorado in the 13th inning, scoring Trevor Story. Scott Oberg recorded the win, striking out Gore, Baez, and Albert Almora in the bottom of the 13th to secure a spot in the NLDS. Oberg became the first reliever to win a postseason game when facing at least four batters and striking out all of them.
