= Noel Cuevas =

Puerto Rican baseball player (born 1991)

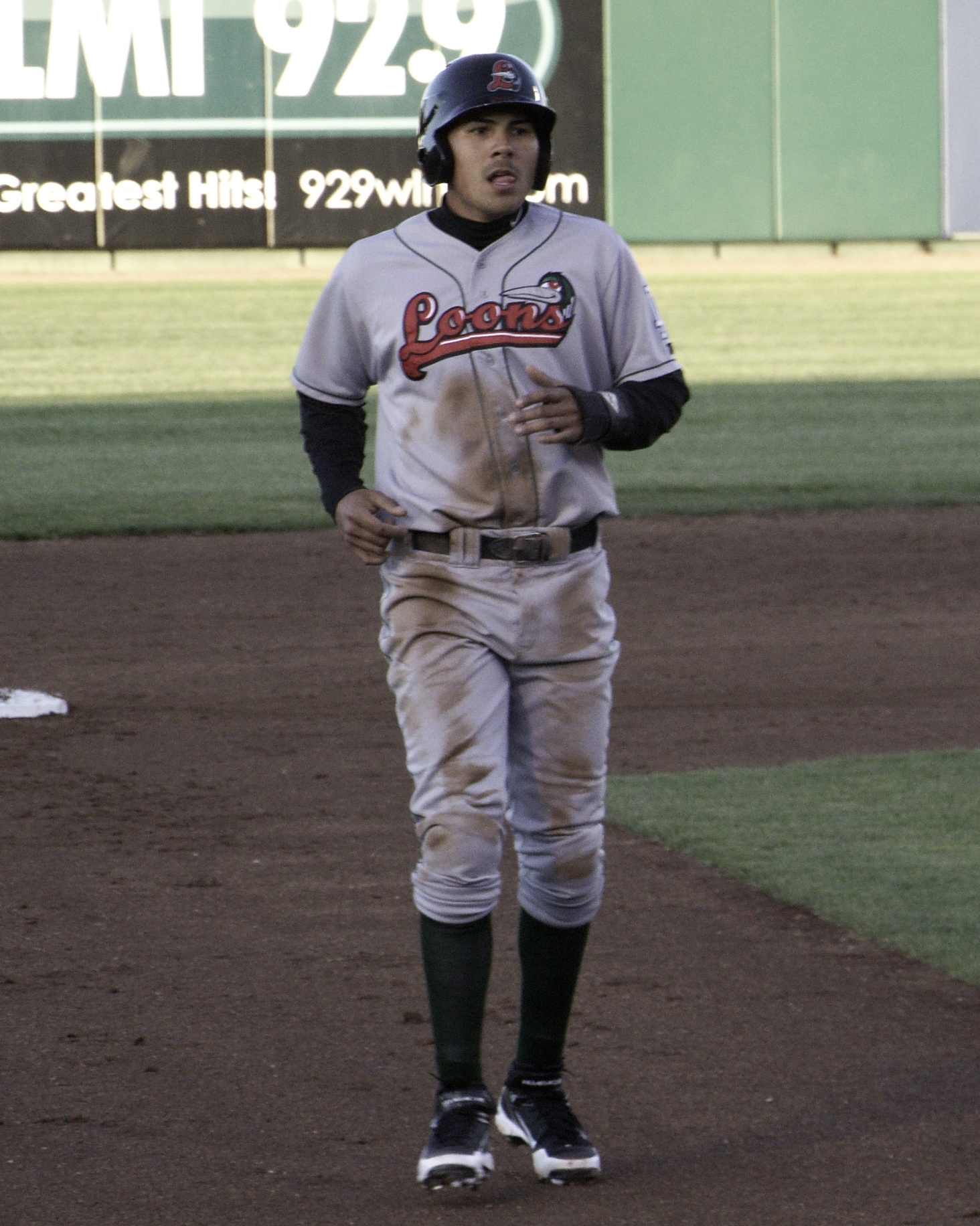
- Cuevas with the Great Lakes Loons in 2012
- Outfielder
- Born: October 2, 1991 (age 33); Camuy, Puerto Rico
- Batted: Right Threw: Right

MLB debut
- April 22, 2018, for the Colorado Rockies

Last MLB appearance
- April 15, 2019, for the Colorado Rockies

MLB statistics
- Batting average: .230
- Home runs: 2
- Runs batted in: 10
- Stats at Baseball Reference

Teams
- Colorado Rockies (2018–2019)

Noel A. Cuevas (born October 2, 1991) is a Puerto Rican former professional baseball outfielder who played in Major League Baseball (MLB) for the Colorado Rockies.

== Career ==
=== Los Angeles Dodgers ===
Cuevas was drafted by the Los Angeles Dodgers in the 21st round of the 2010 Major League Baseball draft out of Universidad Interamericana in San Juan, Puerto Rico.

After a brief appearance (3 games) with the Arizona League Dodgers in 2010, he began 2011 with the Ogden Raptors of the Pioneer League (baseball), where he hit .285 in 60 games. He also appeared in 23 games with the Rancho Cucamonga Quakes, but hit just .220 with them. In 2012, he played 23 games in the Arizona League, 13 in the Pioneer League and 50 in the Midwest League with the Great Lakes Loons. Overall, he hit .267. In 2014, he spent the entire season with the Quakes and hit .284 with 12 homers and 66 RBI in 123 games. He made the mid-season California League all-star team. He was promoted in 2014 to the Double–A Chattanooga Lookouts of the Southern League and hit .231 in 131 games.

=== Colorado Rockies ===
On December 16, 2014, Cuevas was traded to the Colorado Rockies as the player to be named later in the previous trade that sent pitcher Juan Nicasio to the Dodgers. He spent the 2015 season with the Double-A New Britain Rock Cats, slashing .264/.305/.355 in 112 games. He split the 2016 season between the Triple-A Albuquerque Isotopes and the Double-A Hartford Yard Goats, batting .296/.331/.414 with 3 home runs and 35 RBI. In 2017, Cuevas posted a .312/.353/.487 batting line with career-highs in home runs (15) and RBI (79). The Rockies added Cuevas to their 40-man roster on November 7, 2017, in order to protect him from the Rule 5 draft.

Cuevas was called up to the majors for the first time on April 22, 2018, and made his debut that day. He finished his rookie season hitting .233/.268/.315 with 2 home runs and 10 RBI in 75 games. He only made one appearance for Colorado in 2019, spending the majority of the season in Triple-A. On September 3, 2019, Cuevas was designated for assignment. He was outrighted to Triple-A Albuquerque on September 6. Cuevas elected free agency following the season on November 4.

=== Chicago Cubs ===
On January 22, 2020, Cuevas signed a minor league contract with the Chicago Cubs. He did not play in a game in 2020 due to the cancellation of the minor league season because of the COVID-19 pandemic. Cuevas was released by the Cubs organization on May 28.
