= DJ Johnson (baseball) =

American baseball player (born 1989)

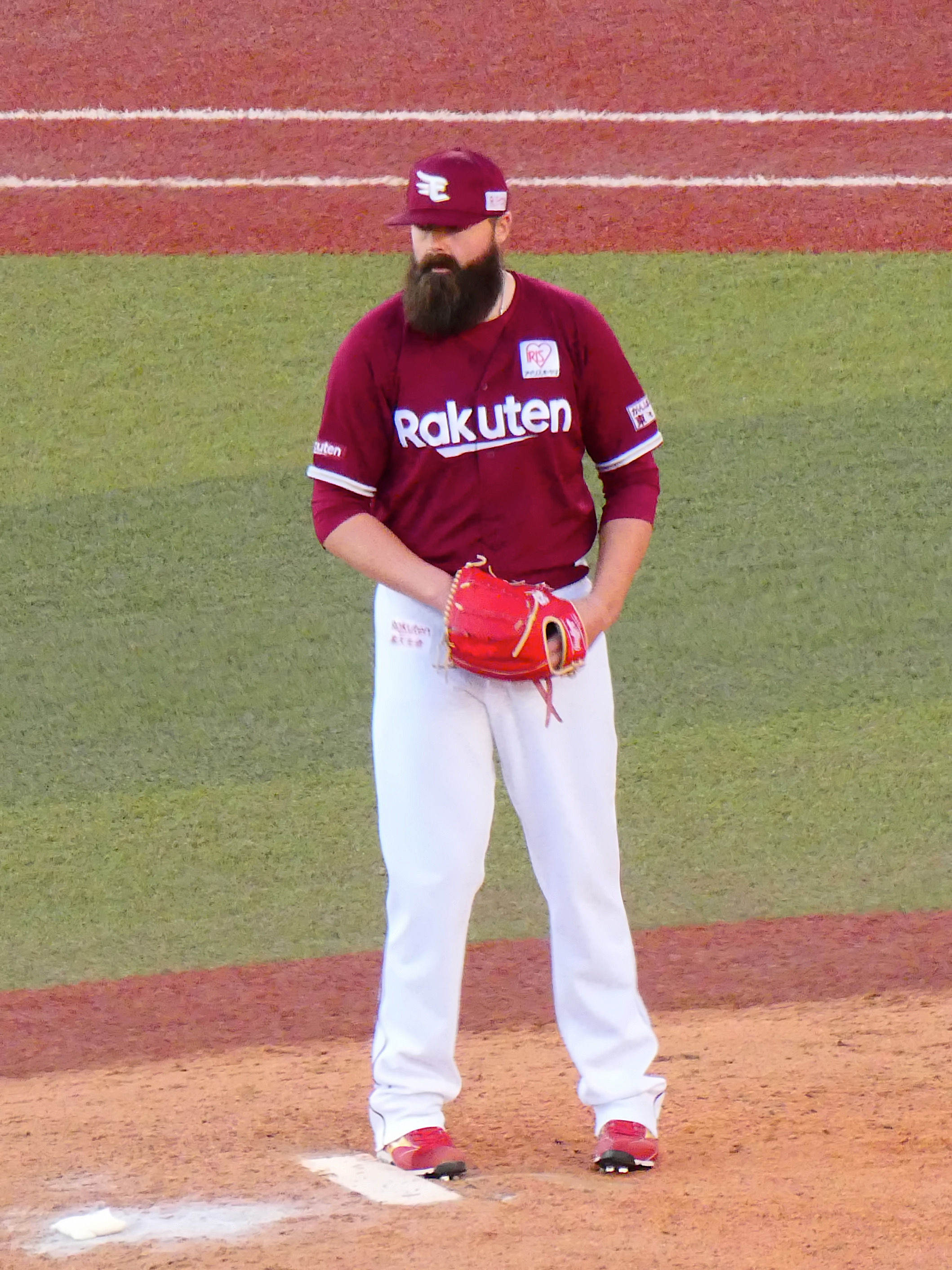
- Johnson with the Tohoku Rakuten Golden Eagles

Hagerstown Flying Boxcars – No. 33
- Pitcher
- Born: August 30, 1989 (age 36); Beaverton, Oregon, U.S.
- Bats: Left Throws: Right

Professional debut
- MLB: September 9, 2018, for the Colorado Rockies
- NPB: July 10, 2020, for the Hiroshima Toyo Carp

MLB statistics (through 2021 season)
- Win–loss record: 1–2
- Earned run average: 4.54
- Strikeouts: 38

NPB statistics (through 2020 season)
- Win–loss record: 1–0
- Earned run average: 3.81
- Strikeouts: 29
- Stats at Baseball Reference

Teams
- Colorado Rockies (2018–2019); Hiroshima Toyo Carp (2020); Tohoku Rakuten Golden Eagles (2020); Cleveland Indians (2021); Tampa Bay Rays (2021)

Daniel Stuart Johnson (born August 30, 1989) is an American professional baseball pitcher for the Hagerstown Flying Boxcars of the Atlantic League of Professional Baseball. He has previously played in Major League Baseball (MLB) for the Colorado Rockies, Cleveland Indians, and Tampa Bay Rays, and in Nippon Professional Baseball (NPB) for the Hiroshima Toyo Carp and Tohoku Rakuten Golden Eagles.

== Amateur career ==
Johnson attended Sunset High School in Beaverton, Oregon. He attended Mount Hood Community College in Gresham, Oregon for two years (2008 and 2009). He then attended Western Oregon University in 2010. An injury kept him from pitching that season, and poor grades limited him to just 11 games played as a position player.

== Professional career ==
=== Tampa Bay Rays ===
Undrafted after his junior year of college, Johnson signed a free agent contract with the Tampa Bay Rays on June 24, 2010, after being noticed by a scout at a local American Legion exhibition game. He played for the GCL Rays in 2010. He was released by the Rays on April 20, 2011.

=== Arizona Diamondbacks ===
He then signed and played for the Traverse City Beach Bums of the independent baseball Frontier League, until signing a minor league contract with the Arizona Diamondbacks on July 5, 2011. He spent the 2011 through 2013 seasons in the Arizona system, playing for the South Bend Silver Hawks and the Visalia Rawhide. Johnson did not appear in a game in 2013; instead rehabbing a torn Teres Major muscle, that occurred during the 2012 season.

=== Minnesota Twins ===
Johnson was released by Arizona after the 2013 season, and again played for Traverse City to start the 2014 season. He signed a minor league contract with the Minnesota Twins on July 28, 2014 and remained in their system through the 2015 season. He played for the Fort Myers Miracle and the Chattanooga Lookouts while with the Twins.

=== Los Angeles Angels ===
Johnson signed a minor league contract with the Miami Marlins on November 24, 2015, but was selected by the Los Angeles Angels in the Triple A phase of the Rule 5 draft on December 10. He made 47 appearances for the Double–A Arkansas Travelers in 2016, compiling a 4.02 ERA with 67 strikeouts and 6 saves across 69 1/3 innings pitched. Johnson elected free agency following the season on November 7, 2016.

=== Colorado Rockies ===
Johnson signed a minor league contract with the Colorado Rockies on November 18, 2016. He spent the 2017 season with the Hartford Yard Goats. Johnson spent the 2018 minor league season with the Albuquerque Isotopes.

Johnson was called up to the major leagues for the first time on September 4, 2018 and made he debut five days later on September 9.

In 2019, Johnson made the Rockies' Opening Day roster. Johnson was released by the Rockies on October 23, 2019 to seek an opportunity in Japan.

=== Hiroshima Toyo Carp ===
On October 25, 2019, Johnson signed a one-year contract with the Hiroshima Toyo Carp of Nippon Professional Baseball.(NPB) On July 10, 2020, Johnson made his NPB debut.

=== Tohoku Rakuten Golden Eagles ===
On September 21, 2020, Johnson was traded to the Tohoku Rakuten Golden Eagles in exchange for cash. In 16 appearances for the Eagles, he logged a 3.07 ERA with 16 strikeouts. On December 2, 2020, Johnson became a free agent.

=== Cleveland Indians ===
On February 2, 2021, Johnson was signed by the Cleveland Indians to a minor league contract. He began the 2021 season with the Columbus Clippers, the Indians' Triple-A affiliate.

In May 2021, Johnson was named to the roster of the United States national baseball team for the Americas Qualifying Event.

On July 7, 2021, Johnson was selected to the 40-man roster and added to the Indians’ active roster.

=== Tampa Bay Rays (second stint) ===
On July 30, 2021, Johnson was traded to the Tampa Bay Rays along with Jordan Luplow in exchange for Peyton Battenfield. On August 16, Johnson was placed on the 60-day injured list with a sprained right shoulder, with manager Kevin Cash noting that he would miss "significant time." On November 5, Johnson was outrighted off of the 40-man roster and elected free agency.

=== High Point Rockers ===
On January 11, 2024, after two years of inactivity, Johnson signed with the Leones de Yucatán of the Mexican League. However, he was released prior to the start of the LMB season on April 1.

On August 14, 2024, Johnson signed with the High Point Rockers of the Atlantic League of Professional Baseball. In 4 games for High Point, Johnson struggled to a 9.00 ERA with 5 strikeouts over 4 innings pitched.

=== York Revolution ===
On August 30, 2024, Johnson was traded to the York Revolution of the Atlantic League of Professional Baseball. In 5 games for the Revolution, he struggled to a 24.55 ERA with 4 strikeouts over 3 2/3 innings of work. With York, Johnson won the Atlantic League championship. He became a free agent following the season.

=== Tigres de Quintana Roo ===
On June 2, 2025, Johnson signed with the Tigres de Quintana Roo of the Mexican League. He made 24 appearances for Quintana Roo, posting an 0-1 record and 4.15 ERA with 19 strikeouts across 21 2/3 innings pitched. Johnson was released by the Tigres on November 24.

=== Hagerstown Flying Boxcars ===
On April 16, 2026, Johnson signed with the Hagerstown Flying Boxcars of the Atlantic League of Professional Baseball.

== Personal life ==
After the 2016 season, Johnson was not offered a contract by the Angels, and he worked at a lumber yard that offseason before being signed by the Rockies.

== See also ==
- Rule 5 draft results
