= Scott Oberg =

American baseball player (born 1990)

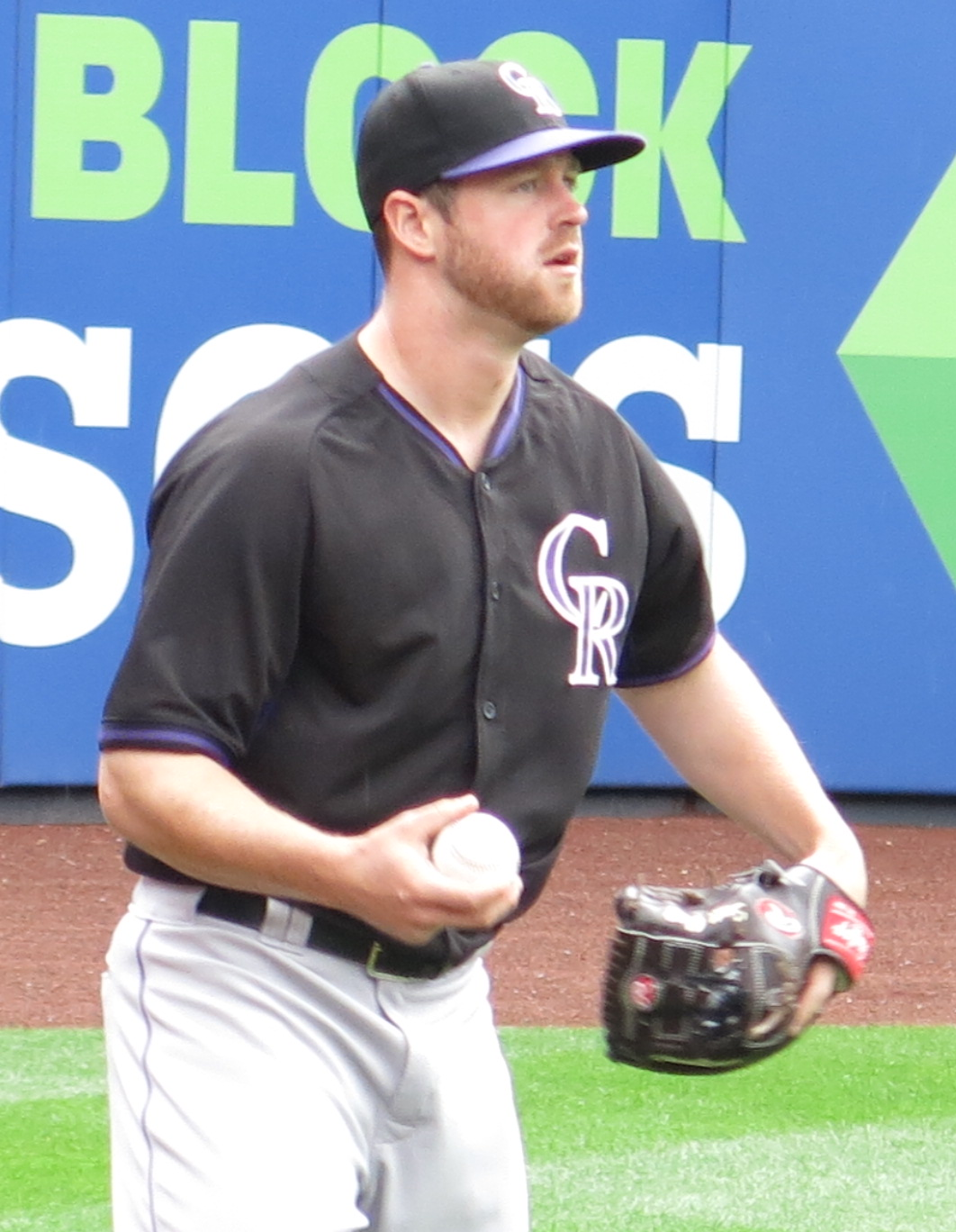
- Oberg with the Rockies in 2016
- Pitcher
- Born: March 13, 1990 (age 36); Tewksbury, Massachusetts, U.S.
- Batted: Right Threw: Right

MLB debut
- April 14, 2015, for the Colorado Rockies

Last MLB appearance
- August 16, 2019, for the Colorado Rockies

MLB statistics
- Win–loss record: 18–8
- Earned run average: 3.85
- Strikeouts: 234
- Stats at Baseball Reference

Teams
- Colorado Rockies (2015–2019)

Scott Michael Oberg (born March 13, 1990) is an American former professional baseball pitcher who currently serves as a minor league pitching coordinator the Colorado Rockies of Major League Baseball (MLB). He played in MLB for five seasons with the Rockies. Oberg played college baseball at the University of Connecticut.

== Playing career ==
=== College ===
Oberg played college baseball at the University of Connecticut for the Huskies from 2009 to 2012. In 2009, he played collegiate summer baseball with the Bourne Braves of the Cape Cod Baseball League. In 2011, he underwent Tommy John surgery.

=== Colorado Rockies ===
Oberg was drafted by the Colorado Rockies in the 15th round of the 2012 Major League Baseball draft. He signed with the Rockies and made his professional debut with the Grand Junction Rockies. In 2013, he played for the Modesto Nuts. Pitching for the Double-A Tulsa Drillers in 2014, Oberg appeared in only 27 games due to injury.

When the Rockies placed John Axford on family leave on April 12, 2015, the Rockies promoted Oberg to the major leagues. Oberg finished his rookie year with an ERA of 5.09 and notched 44 strikeouts in 58.1 innings of work. In 2016 for Colorado, Oberg recorded a 5.19 ERA with 20 strikeouts across 26.0 innings of work.

In the 2017 season, Oberg appeared in 66 games for the Rockies, with an ERA below 5.00 for the first time in his career (4.94), and a career-high in strikeouts (55). In 2018 for Colorado, Oberg recorded an 8-1 record with a stellar 2.45 ERA and a new career-high in strikeouts (57) in 58.2 major league innings. Oberg was the winning pitcher in the 2018 National League Wild Card Game against the Chicago Cubs, becoming the first reliever to win a postseason game when facing at least four batters and striking out all of them. On January 10, 2019, Oberg agreed to a $1.3MM contract to avoid arbitration with the Rockies.

On August 19, 2019, the Rockies placed Oberg on the 60-day injured list due to issues with blood clots in his arms, ending his season. In 2019, Oberg produced a 6–1 record with a 2.25 ERA, 5 saves, and 58 strikeouts in 56 innings. Oberg began the 2020 season on the injured list and was placed on the 45-day injured list with blood clots in his right arm, shutting down his 2020 season without making an appearance. On March 26, 2021, Oberg underwent surgery to treat blood clots in his pitching elbow, the third surgery Oberg has had to treat blood clots. On March 27, Oberg was placed on the 60-day injured list with his career in jeopardy after undergoing the surgery.

On November 8, 2022, the Rockies declined Oberg’s team option, and he became a free agent for the first time in his career.

== Post-playing career ==
On January 10, 2023, Oberg took to Instagram to announce his retirement, “I have accepted a part-time position with the Rockies and will no longer be pursuing the game I’ve loved my whole life, as a player. — Unfortunately the numerous blood clots I suffered over the course of my career has made playing untenable.” Oberg wrote. His official role was listed as a special assistant to baseball operations. Oberg had not pitched professionally in three seasons at the time of his retirement.

On January 2, 2025, the Rockies announced that Oberg would be hired as a minor league pitching coordinator.

== Personal ==
Oberg and his wife, Diana, have one daughter together. They reside in New Jersey in the offseason.
