= 2018 St. Louis Cardinals season =

Major League Baseball season

2018 St. Louis Cardinals
- League: National League
- Division: Central
- Ballpark: Busch Stadium
- City: St. Louis, Missouri
- Record: 88–74 (.543)
- Divisional place: 3rd
- Owners: William DeWitt, Jr. Fred Hanser
- General managers: Mike Girsch
- Managers: Mike Matheny (through July 14); Mike Shildt (from July 15)
- Television: Fox Sports Midwest (Dan McLaughlin, Al Hrabosky, Rick Horton, Tim McCarver, Jim Edmonds, Brad Thompson)
- Radio: KMOX NewsRadio 1120; St. Louis Cardinals Radio Network (Mike Shannon, John Rooney, Rick Horton, Mike Claiborne)
- Stats: ESPN.com; Baseball Reference

The 2018 St. Louis Cardinals season was the 137th for the St. Louis Cardinals of Major League Baseball (MLB), a franchise in St. Louis, Missouri. It was the 127th season for the Cardinals in the National League, and their 13th at Busch Stadium III.

Forbes ranked the Cardinals as the seventh-highest valued team of the 30 teams in 2017 for its $1.9 billion valuation (+6%), with a $319 million revenue, and $40 million operating income. The Cardinals also had baseball's second-highest local television rating, averaging 7.18 on FS Midwest. On September 29, the Dodgers beat the Giants, keeping the Cardinals out of the playoffs for a third consecutive season, a first since 1997–1999.

Until 2023, the 2018 season was the last season that the Cardinals missed the playoffs.

== Off-season ==
=== Overview ===
==== Busch Stadium update ====
The Cardinals removed several sections of seats in right field and began construction on a new mingling area like the ones at Coors Field (Colorado Rockies), and Petco Park (San Diego Padres). The area will have bars and open spaces from which to watch games, and it will be open to all fans at the ballpark. The Cardinals sold ticket subscriptions this past year, and such a mix zone in the ballpark would be a place to go for standing-room only. The area is scheduled to open with the 2018 season. The new space will be called Budweiser Terrace, renovating a 20,000 square feet (0.46 acres) area that cost the club 1,000 seats from six sections on the fourth level. In their place, they will be adding two full-service bars, standing areas, and lounge seating from which fans can still view the full playing field. This area will be used by live bands/DJs and for outdoor games, Cardinals Theme Ticket events and other pregame performances. Seating and lounge areas in the Budweiser Terrace will be available to fans on a first-come, first-served basis and will not require a special ticket for access. The renovations are scheduled to be completed ahead of the Cardinals' 2018 home opener on April 5. The website is: http://www.cardinals.com/budweiserterrace.

==== Injuries ====
Adam Wainwright was scheduled to undergo elbow surgery on October 3, 2017, for a bone bruise there; he will have a piece of cartilage shaved down. Doctors said he will need six weeks of recovery before beginning rehabilitation. He last pitched two innings in relief on September 23, 2017, before the Cardinals shut him down for the remainder of 2017. He finished the season 12–5 with a 5.11 ERA. Only eight of his 23 starts registered as quality.

==== Coaching staff changes ====
The Cardinals wasted no time making changes to personnel after the October 1, 2017, end to that frustrating baseball season with a third-place finish, their lowest since 2008. Pitching coach Derek Lilliquist and bullpen coach Blaise Ilsley were told on October 3, 2017, they would not be retained for the 2018 season. John Mozeliak, President of Baseball Operations noted that the organization would like to employ a pitching coach who is more willing to utilize advanced metrics and data compiled by the baseball operations staff. The Cardinals were among a growing number of teams to utilize an eight-man bullpen for the majority of the season, a move that came out of a league wide trend of starters not pitching as deeply into games. That has made in-game pitching decisions more complex and increasingly data driven. After posting a Major-League low 2.94 ERA in 2015, the Cardinals' team ERA jumped to 4.08 in 2016, and 4.01 in 2017. Those represented the club's highest season ERAs since Matheny took over as manager. Mozeliak said he expects the rest of manager Mike Matheny's staff to return in 2018. The exception to that is Ron "Pop" Warner, who stepped in as "quality control coach" when the organization underwent a midseason 2017 staff shakeup. Warner is likely to return to his previous role of assistant field coordinator. Bench coach for the past three seasons, David Bell, left the team on October 20, 2017, to become the vice president of player development for the San Francisco Giants.

On October 23, 2017, the Cardinals announced that Jose Oquendo, 54, would return as third base coach, after a two-year hiatus in which he recovered from multiple knee surgeries and served as a special assistant to the general manager at the team's Roger Dean Stadium (Jupiter, Florida) complex. Before his March 2016 leave of absence, he served for 16 years in that same job title, and played the majority of his 12-year career with the Cardinals, 1986–95. Former centerfielder and 1985 NL MVP, Willie McGee, 58, joins the coaching staff for the first time, not yet given a job title. He was a special assistant to the GM in 2013, after an 18-year playing career; 13 with the Cardinals, 1982–90, 1996–99. He has become a regular guest instructor at Spring Training, and he made frequent visits to the organization's affiliates to assist with instruction. Mike Shildt, 48, has been promoted to bench coach from quality control and then third base coach in his 2017 position as a first-year coach, filling the vacancy left when David Bell accepted a job with the San Francisco Giants. Shildt previously managed for eight years in the Cardinals' farm system. Ron ("Pop") Warner will return to his role as assistant field coordinator.

Three days after hiring their third base coach and bench coach, the Cardinals on October 26, hired long-time MLB pitching coach Mike Maddux, 56, older brother of Hall of Fame pitcher Greg Maddux. Mike Maddux was the Washington Nationals pitching coach for the past two seasons. The Cardinals also promoted AAA-Memphis pitching coach Bryan Eversgerd, 48, as their new bullpen coach, who has been a pitching coach for 15 years, including the last five with Memphis.

==== Player acquisitions and departures ====
===== 2017 =====
On November 2, LH Zach Duke, RH Lance Lynn, Juan Nicasio, and Seung Hwan Oh elected to be free agents.

On November 6, the Cardinals decided to give an unconditional release to RH (former) closer Trevor Rosenthal, making him a free agent. He was in recovery from Tommy John surgery from August, making him unavailable for most of the 2018 season. Rosenthal was under team control for 2018, but the Cardinals would have had to pay him a salary well beyond what he would be able to pitch. Other moves from the 40-man roster included removing SS Alex Mejia and C Alberto Rosario both outrighted to the AAA-Memphis Redbirds, bringing the roster down from 36 to 34, with Rosenthal on the 60-day disabled list. The Cardinals put a higher value on keeping a roster spot open for the coming season and this winter. They have a handful of prospects that must be added to the 40-man roster to be protected from the Rule 5 draft. The deadline to do that is November 20, 7pm CT. As expected, the Cardinals tendered a qualifying offer to RH starter Lance Lynn, 30. The one-year, $17.4-million deal will be rejected by Lynn as he enters free agency. It does mean that the Cardinals will secure a compensatory draft pick if Lynn signs with another team. That pick will come after the second round. Shortstop Paul DeJong is one of the top three vote-getters for the National League Rookie of the Year award. No other free agents with the Cardinals were offered a qualifying offer. Lynn has until 4pm CT on Thu. November 16 to decide whether to accept or decline the qualifying offer. He is expected to decline. If he signs elsewhere, the value of his new contract would not be a factor in determining the slot of that Competitive Balance Round B pick. He made a team-high 33 starts in 2017, finishing with an 11–8 record and 3.43 ERA. His home run rate (1.3 per nine innings) and walk rate (10.1 percent) were career highs, but Lynn's durability and career 124 ERA+ should make him one of the more attractive free-agent starters. Lynn rejected the qualifying offer, and became a first-time free agent, one of nine players in MLB who also rejected the $17.4 million one-year offer.

The Cardinals receive a Competitive Balance Round A draft pick (#39), assigned between the first and second rounds because of the reverse order in the standings from the 2017 season. They will also pick #19 in the first round.

The Cardinals added four players to the 40-man roster before the 7pm CT deadline on November 20, to protect them from the Rule 5 draft, bringing the roster to 39. The categories are: 19 pitchers, 2 catchers, 9 infielders, and 9 outfielders. Protected are three in the team's Top 20 prospects: RHP Derian Gonzalez (22), LHP Austin Gomber (24 on Nov. 23, 2017; #15 prospect), plus two OF's: Tyler O'Neill (22; #4 prospect), and Oscar Mercado (22, #18 prospect). The most notable player left unprotected by the Cardinals is corner infielder Patrick Wisdom, who slugged .507 with 25 doubles, 31 homers and 89 RBIs for AAA-Memphis last season. He will be available for Rule 5 selection, along with Daniel Poncedeleon, Matt Pearce, Trey Nielsen, Andrew Morales and others. Wisdom has been passed over in the Rule 5 Draft before. O'Neill was acquired in a Trade Deadline swap with the Seattle Mariners in July 2017, and the former third-round pick finished the year with 31 homers and 95 RBIs at the Triple-A level. O'Neill has a career .850 OPS in the Minors. Gomber was a fourth-round selection by the Cardinals in the 2013 MLB draft, he went 10–7 with a 3.34 ERA, 1.168 WHIP and 140 strikeouts over 143 innings at Double-A Springfield in '17. Mercado was drafted as a shortstop in the 2013 MLB draft, he became a full-time outfielder for the first time in 2017. He coupled a smooth defensive transition with his best offensive season, slashing .287/.341/.428 with a .769 OPS in 120 games with Double-A Springfield. Mercado, then followed with a standout showing in the Arizona Fall League. Gonzalez went 4–7 with a 4.33 ERA in 18 games (15 starts) for Class A Advanced Palm Beach last season. In 79 innings, Gonzalez struck out 72, walked 30 and posted a 1.37 WHIP. The Cardinals signed Gonzalez as a non-drafted free agent out of Venezuela in September 2012. Eligibility for the Rule 5 Draft is dependent upon how old a player was when he signed with the organization. Players who signed at the age of 18 or younger become eligible after five seasons. Those who were 19 or older have four years before they must be protected. This year's Rule 5 Draft is scheduled for December 14, the final day of baseball's Winter Meetings in Lake Buena Vista, FL.

SS Aledmys Diaz, 27, was traded for minor leaguer (A-level, Midwest League) OF prospect J.B. Woodman, 22, in the Toronto Blue Jays organization, on December 1, dropping the 40-man roster number to 38. Diaz hit .259 with a .682 OPS in 79 games. Woodman, the Jays' second-round Draft pick in 2016, was Toronto's No. 28 prospect according to MLBPipeline.com. The left-handed-hitting outfielder batted .240 with a .699 OPS, seven home runs and eight steals in 96 games for the Class A Lansing in 2017. Woodman, who turns 23 on Dec. 13, has mostly played center and right field. Starter Michael Wacha, OF'er Randal Grichuk, and LH-reliever Tyler Lyons, all arbitration-eligible, were unsurprisingly offered contracts for next season.

On December 5, the Cardinals signed RH starter Miles Mikolas, 29, in a two-year deal for $15.5 million. He had pitched in Japan (Yomiuri Giants) since 2015, with a record over 62 games of 31–13 with a 2.18 ERA, striking out 378 batters in 424 2/3 innings. In 2017, he had an 8.13 strikeouts/walk rate. He last pitched in MLB for the Texas Rangers in 2014. He was born in Jupiter, Florida, where the Cardinals hold spring training.

On December 8, the Cardinals failed to acquire Giancarlo Stanton, 28, the reigning NL MVP (2017, .281 59 HR, 132 RBI), when he turned down the Cardinals' trade offer to him, because of his no-trade clause with the Miami Marlins. He has 10 years and $295 million remaining from his November 2014 ($325 million, 13-years) contract, plus an after age-30 opt-out with the Marlins. A report by Craig Mish of SiriusXM late Thursday (December 7) indicated that Stanton would accept trades only to the Dodgers, Cubs, Yankees and Astros. Knowing that they have been eliminated from the mix now allows the Cardinals to focus their attention elsewhere as they seek to upgrade the offense with the addition of a middle-of-the-order hitter. The Cardinals have prepared for this pivot by spending the last several weeks having conversations with other teams and agents about potential Plan B fits. Stanton later that same day, turned down an offer from the San Francisco Giants. Stanton has reportedly signed a deal, pending a physical, with the New York Yankees on December 9. Stanton said about the Cardinals and the Giants: "But that just wasn't the fit for me. We (the Marlins and Cardinals) shared the same spring training, so I've noticed how they go about their business, how it's a winning-first culture, the fans, everything," Stanton said. "It's a great organization."

The Cardinals announced the signing of free agent RH reliever Luke Gregerson, 33, on December 13. It was a reunion, because the Cardinals selected him back in the 28th round of the 2006 MLB draft. Gregerson spent five years with the San Diego Padres before pitching for the Oakland A's and Houston Astros. He posted a 4.57 ERA and gave up 13 home runs in 61 innings pitched. But he has a career 3.02 ERA and a 9.1 K/9 rate over nine MLB seasons.

The big impact bat the Cardinals were searching for happened on December 13, finalized on December 14, with the trade of Marcell Ozuna (LF), 27, from the Miami Marlins. The Cardinals gave up prospects Magneuris Sierra (OF), and pitchers Sandy Alcantara (RH), 22, the centerpiece of the deal, Zac Gallen (RH), 22, and Daniel Castano (LH), 23. Ozuna hit .312/.376/.548, 37 HR, 124 RBI in 2017. Ozuna will likely stay in left with the Cardinals, who plan to use Tommy Pham in center field and Dexter Fowler in right. It's an alignment the Cards can keep for at least the next two seasons, as Ozuna will not become a free agent until after the 2019 season. Castano, (LHP), 23, is unranked among the Cardinals' top 30 prospects, while Alcantara is the 9th-rated prospect, and Gallen the 13th.

The Cardinals completed a deal with the Oakland Athletics also on December 14, trying to unload the outfield logjam, sending Stephen Piscotty (OF), 26, to them, in exchange for infield prospects Yairo Munoz, 22 (RH, SS), and Max Schrock, 23, (LH, 2b). Piscotty is a Bay Area native, took time off in 2017 to be with his mother, struggling with ALS. Piscotty hit .235/.342/.367, 9 HR, 39 RBIs (341 AB, 107 G) in 2017. Munoz, who signed with the A's in 2012, hit .267 in six Minor League seasons with Oakland, totaling 41 home runs in 473 games. He hit .300 between Double-A Midland and Triple-A Nashville this year, and he plays multiple positions. He was ranked No. 13 among A's prospects by MLBPipeline.com. Schrock, primarily a second baseman, also had a nice season, earning a place on the Texas League Midseason and Postseason All-Star teams after batting .321 with seven homers and 46 RBIs for Midland. He was Oakland's No. 17 prospect The Cardinals gave Piscotty a six-year $33.5 million extension prior to his ill-fated 2017 season.

===== 2018 =====
On January 11, Randal Grichuk became the first of four arbitration-eligible players to reach an agreement as he signed a one-year $2.6 million contract. Grichuk made $557,200 in 2017, entered the offseason eligible for arbitration for the first time in his career. In 442 plate appearances last season, Grichuk slashed .238/.285/.473 for a .758 OPS. The deal comes one day before clubs and any remaining unsigned arbitration-eligible players will exchange desired salary figures. Michael Wacha, Marcell Ozuna, and Tyler Lyons, all of whom remain unsigned, need to find common ground with the Cardinals without bringing a third-party arbiter in to make the decision. The next day, the other three arbitration-eligible players signed contracts. All agreed to 1-year deals, and the amounts were not disclosed by the Cardinals, but MLB Network insider Jon Heyman said Ozuna's contract is worth $9 million up from $3.5 million. The St. Louis Post-Dispatch reporter Derrick Goold said Wacha's salary almost doubled from $2.775 million to $5.3 million. Tyler Lyons earned $549,800 in 2017, and will receive $1.2 million in 2018.

President of Baseball Operations, John Mozeliak said on January 13, that (RHP) Luke Gregerson, 33, will be the new closer, "going into the season. ... He has experience doing it." The former Houston Astro pitcher returns to the Cards' organization with 66 career saves, including 31 for the 2015 Houston Astros that made the postseason. He had a 4.57 ERA in 2017, while giving up 13 homers in 61 innings. But in his eight previous seasons, the highest ERA he ever posted was 3.28. And for his career, Gregerson has a 9.1 strikeout-per-nine-inning rate. In 2017, he was 2–3, with 1 save, walking 20, and giving up 62 hits with a 1.344 WHIP.

On January 19, the Cardinals traded OF Randal Grichuk to the Toronto Blue Jays for two RH relievers: Dominic Leone, 26, and Connor Greene, 22. Leone ranked 12th among qualifying American League relievers with a 2.56 ERA last season and struck out 81 in 70 1/3 innings. Leone had success against both right-handed (.211 average) and left-handed (.183) batters, while posting a 1.05 WHIP and registering 11 holds. Leone stranded 78 percent of inherited runners, the 13th-highest percentage among AL relievers. The Cardinals will have him under team control for another four seasons. Greene reached Double-A last year, and finished 5–10 with a 5.29 ERA in 26 games (25 starts). He struck out 92 and walked 83 over 132 2/3 innings. According to MLB Pipeline's scouting report, Greene features a fastball in the mid-to-upper 90s, as well as an above-average changeup. He is also developing a slider and curveball, both of which scouts believe will improve once he finds a more consistent release point. With the additions of Leone and Greene, the Cardinals' 40-man roster is once again full. This marks the second trade the Cardinals have made with the Blue Jays this winter. In December, the Cardinals dealt away shortstop Aledmys Diaz for Minor League outfielder J.B. Woodman.

Eleven days (Feb. 2) before pitchers and catchers were to report (Feb. 13) to Spring Training, the Cardinals invited 23 players as Non-roster invites (NRI). Included are 10 pitchers, five catchers, six infielders, and two outfielders. The pitching prospects are headed by Dakota Hudson, Jordan Hicks, and Ryan Helsley, who are ranked 7, 13, and 22, respectively in the 2017 Top 30 Prospect list by MLB Pipeline. A snapshot of the 23 NRIs with their jersey's new numbers are listed at the reference. The beat writer (Goold) provides a status report on these NRIs.

The Cardinals officially signed RH reliever Bud Norris on February 14. To make room for him on the 40-man roster, the team designated for assignment RH Rowan Wick. Wick was claimed off waivers on February 16, by the San Diego Padres.

Former reliever and closer Jason Motte, 35, was signed to a minor league deal on February 19, and given an invite to Spring Training. He joins nine other NRI pitchers trying to make the roster. Motte steadily climbed the Cardinals' bullpen depth chart for six seasons after debuting with the club in 2008, elevating to the closer role late during the '11 season, and finishing with a NL-best 42 saves in 2012, with a 2.75 ERA and a career-high 72 innings. Using predominantly a fastball that could reach triple digits, Motte struck out 10.8 batters per nine innings that season, walking just 2.1 batters per nine.

Francisco Pena (C) was signed and given an invitation to spring training on February 23. He is left-handed in everything but throwing. No left-handed player has caught in the Major Leagues, even semi-regularly, since Fred Tenney in 1902. Francisco's father was former Cardinals' catcher Tony Pena for three seasons, 1987–89

Former Cardinals' closer Edward Mujica, 33, was signed to a minor league contract on March 15, and got the save in the March 17 game.

== Spring training ==
=== Schedule ===
The Cardinals announced their spring training schedule on November 2, 2017. They will play 30 games in the Grapefruit League starting on Friday, February 23, against the Miami Marlins, who share the Roger Dean Stadium complex with the Cardinals in Palm Beach. The schedule consists of 14 home games and 16 road games, with four of the latter at Roger Dean Stadium with the Marlins as the home team. Cardinals' pitchers and catchers are scheduled to report to Jupiter, Fla., on Tuesday, Feb. 13, while the rest of the team will report on Sunday, Feb. 18. After their set of Spring Training games, the Cardinals will break camp on Sunday March 25, and play two exhibition games against the Toronto Blue Jays at Olympic Stadium in Montreal on March 26 and 27. The regular season will begin on Thursday, March 29, with a road game against the New York Mets.

The first physicals and official workouts began for pitchers and catchers on (Wed.) February 14.

They were 3–3–0 (Feb. 23-Feb. 28), and 14–10–2 (Mar. 1–27) for a 17–13–2 (.567) record, fifth-best in the Grapefruit League. including the two exhibition games, Mar. 26–27) against the Toronto Blue Jays. in Olympic Stadium in Montreal, their first visit to Montreal since May 2004. March 26 game: W 5–3. March 27 game: L 0–1.

=== Miscellaneous ===
Tommy Pham (CF) was named to MLB writer Anthony Castrovince's "2018 All-Underrated Team" on February 7. Rookie Jack Flaherty will start the first Grapefruit League opener for the Cardinals against the Miami Marlins on (Fri.) February 23. He was 0–2 with a 6.33 ERA in six games (five starts) in 2017. MLBPipeline ranks him as the #38 prospect in baseball .

Paul DeJong (SS), signed a six-year contract extension finalized on March 5, worth a guaranteed total of $26 million, through the 2023 season. The deal also includes two option years and a total possible value of $51.5 million, confirmed a source. The deal is one of the largest ever given to a player who has not had a full year of service. DeJong did not reach the majors until May 28 for the 2017 Cardinals, taking over the shortstop position, swatting a team-high 25 HRs as the #3 hitter in the lineup. He hit .285, with 65 RBIs, and his 25 HRs led all NL shortstops. He hit 38 HRs total in 2017, counting the 13 he hit for the AAA Memphis Redbirds. He was runner-up in the 2017 NL Rookie of the Year Award.

On the same day the Cardinals signed DeJong, they renewed Tommy Pham (CF) for 2018, three days before his 30th birthday, and he signed for $570,000; one of the largest contracts for a third-year player. Discussions on a two-year deal never went anywhere. Pham will be arbitration-eligible after this season. He came a few days shy of being arbitration-eligible because he was in the minors, cracking out production, for a few extra days.

Free agent and former Cardinals' starter Lance Lynn signed a one-year deal with the Minnesota Twins (AL) for $12 million. It was less than the $17.4 million in a qualifying offer the Cardinals extended to him in the off-season. Minnesota needed to strengthen their pitching that ranked 19th (of 30) with a 4.59 ERA in 2017. Lynn was 11–8, with a 3.43 ERA with 33 starts in 2017. The signing guarantees the Cardinals will secure a compensatory draft pick. That pick will come after the second round.

=== Injuries ===
Tyler O'Neill (OF), 22, is battling a strained, left oblique muscle, and has yet to appear in a game, as of March 4. Arturo Reyes (P), who had an ankle injury at the start of camp, will rejoin the big-league camp. He's available to pitch in the coming days. There are 56 in major-league camp.

Matt Carpenter (INF) may not be ready by Opening Day, March 29, due to an ongoing back injury. No Cardinals' player has appeared in more games over the last five years than Carpenter, whom Matheny tabbed as his No. 3 hitter before camp opened. Nearly a month later, Carpenter has been one of the least visible players in camp, his days spent rehabbing in the trainer's room.

Prospective closer Luke Gregerson was also battling an irritated oblique muscle, first reported on (Tue.) March 6. He will be held back for at least one week, and possibly two weeks. Spring Training ends on Sun. March 25. He has pitched three scoreless innings in Grapefruit League play this spring, but he had not pitched since March 20 because of a left hamstring sprain suffered after the oblique strain. He will start the season on the DL, manager Mike Matheny announced on March 24.

Announced on March 25, Adam Wainwright (#2 starter) will also begin the season on the disabled list, with a left hamstring strain, injured during conditioning drills. He will miss the home opener on April 5. Jack Flaherty will be the fifth starter.

=== Cuts ===
Jordan Schafer, Jacob Woodford, Hector Mendoza, and Daniel Poncedelon, were four pitchers, plus catchers Jeremy Martinez and Dennis Ortega, and infielder Max Schrock, all seven on the NRI list, cut to minor-league camp following the 1–4 loss on March 4, leaving 17 on the NRI list.

Nine were cut on March 11. 46 now in camp. Optioned to AAA-Memphis were: Tyler O'Neill (OF), Edmundo Sosa (INF), and Austin Gomber (LHP). Optioned to AA-Springfield were: Derian Gonzalez (RHP), and Connor Greene (RHP). Reassigned 4 NRIs to minor-league camp were: Ryan Helsley (RHP), Dakota Hudson (RHP), and Arturo Reyes (RHP), and Tommy Edman (INF).

Six players were optioned on March 18, including two of their top prospects. Jack Flaherty (RHP) and Carson Kelly (C), plus pitchers John Gant (RH) and Ryan Sherriff (LH), plus Breyvic Valera (2B), and Oscar Mercado (OF). Flaherty, the #2 Cardinals prospect, struck out 20 batters over 13 innings, forcing officials to look past his 4.85 ERA over four starts. Much of that was skewed by one bad inning against Baltimore, when he allowed a grand slam to Manny Machado. Kelly, the #3 Cardinals' prospect, went 3-for-30 (.100) this spring.

The Cardinals gave their former closer Jason Motte, 35, his unconditional release on March 21, but he has two days to find a job with another major league team. If he clears that two-day period without an offer, he can elect to return to the Cardinals and has already been told they have a spot for him. He would have to sign a new deal, as he'll be a free agent. If Motte agrees, he'll be assigned to Class AAA Memphis at that time, an official said. This series of moves is necessary because of the service time Motte has and his rights as a major-league free agent who agreed to a minor-league deal.

Three were optioned to AAA-Memphis on March 23. Josh Lucas (P), Luke Voit (1B), and Harrison Bader (OF) were the ones selected. Yairo Muñoz, 23, had a terrific spring training, winning the final bench spot over Bader. Muñoz's versatility gave him the edge over Bader, who is strictly an outfielder. Munoz played five positions, hitting .375/.423/.625 with 18 hits and 3 HRs, scoring 13 runs over 48 at-bats. The Cardinals expected Munoz to begin the year at AAA, where he held his own in 2017, after slugging through the Texas League. Munoz hit .289/.316/.414 in 65 games at AAA. He was acquired in the off-season trade that sent Stephen Piscotty to the Oakland Athletics. These cuts reduced the active roster to 26, with one more remaining between right-handers John Brebbia and Mike Mayers, for the final bullpen spot. Muñoz has played shortstop, center field, right field, and second base. Manager Mike Matheny said on Muñoz's varied skills, ""I haven't seen anyone whose two primary positions are center field and shortstop." Luke Gregerson (P), earlier troubled by an oblique strain, did not make a road trip from Jupiter because of a "mild" hamstring injury, and would be probable that since he was not fully healthy, would be played on the 10-day disabled list. He was targeted to be the Cardinals' closer, has pitched just three innings, retiring all nine hitters faced.

Francisco Peña (C), Muñoz, José Martínez (OF), and Greg Garcia will make up a four-man bench, with 13 pitchers for Opening Day.

Mike Mayers (RHP) and John Brebbia (RHP) will both be on the 25-man roster, with Luke Gregerson (10-day DL) and Alex Reyes probably on the 60-day DL. Mayers in spring training pitched 12 innings, striking out 13, giving up just five hits, with no runs, no walks. Gregerson has a grade 1 strain, the least severe, and will be out for at least two weeks.

In a stunning change of heart by the Cardinals in one week, High Class-A pitcher Jordan Hicks (RHP), 21, was promoted to the Opening Day roster on March 27, with John Brebbia optioned to AAA-Memphis. Hicks has a fastball that was clocked at 102 mph during spring training, and throws a fastball at 99 mph that has sink to it. He offsets that pitch with a slider that he can throw for a strike, and a changeup that showed greater command and depth this past spring. He was demoted from big-league camp early because he had failed to be punctual for at least two mandatory team functions. To make room for Hicks and backup catcher Francisco Peña on the 40-man roster, the Cardinals will have to make two corresponding moves. They intend to designate a player for assignment, and not place Alex Reyes on the 60-day disabled list because that would push Reyes' return to May 28, at the earliest. Hicks, the Cardinals #7 Prospect, was 8–3 with a 2.74 ERA in 22 games (19 starts) split between Class A Peoria, and High Class-A in 2017. He struck out 95 batters, and allowed just three home runs in 105 Minor League innings.

In the final tweaks to the roster for the regular season on March 28, Alex Reyes was placed on the regular 10-day DL, designated two players: infielder Breyvic Valera, and pitcher Josh Lucas. Francisco Peña was added to the 40-man roster, as was Jordan Hicks.

== Season standings ==
=== National League playoff standings ===
Playoff standings

Division leaders
Team	W	L	Pct.
Milwaukee Brewers	96	67	.589
Los Angeles Dodgers	92	71	.564
Atlanta Braves	90	72	.556

Wild Card teams (Top 2 teams qualify for postseason)
Team	W	L	Pct.	GB
Chicago Cubs	95	68	.583	+4
Colorado Rockies	91	72	.558	—
St. Louis Cardinals	88	74	.543	2½
Pittsburgh Pirates	82	79	.509	8
Arizona Diamondbacks	82	80	.506	8½
Washington Nationals	82	80	.506	8½
Philadelphia Phillies	80	82	.494	10½
New York Mets	77	85	.475	13½
San Francisco Giants	73	89	.451	17½
Cincinnati Reds	67	95	.414	23½
San Diego Padres	66	96	.407	24½
Miami Marlins	63	98	.391	27

=== National League head-to-head records ===
Head-to-head records

2018 National League record Source: MLB Standings Grid – 2018
Team	AZ	ATL	CHC	CIN	COL	LAD	MIA	MIL	NYM	PHI	PIT	SD	SF	STL	WSH	AL
Arizona	—	3–4	3–4	3–3	8–11	11–8	6–1	1–5	2–5	4–2	6–1	12–7	8–11	3–3	2–5	10–10
Atlanta	4–3	—	3–3	3–4	2–5	2–5	14–5	3–4	13–6	12–7	5–1	4–3	3–3	4–2	10–9	8–12
Chicago	4–3	3–3	—	11–8	3–3	4–3	5–2	11–9	6–1	4–2	10–9	5–2	3–3	9–10	4–3	13–7
Cincinnati	3–3	4–3	8–11	—	2–4	6–1	2–5	6–13	3–3	3–4	5–14	3–4	4–2	7–12	1–6	10–10
Colorado	11–8	5–2	3–3	4–2	—	7–13	2–4	2–5	6–1	5–2	3–3	11–8	12–7	2–5	5–2	13–7
Los Angeles	8–11	5–2	3–4	1–6	13–7	—	2–4	4–3	4–2	3–4	5–1	14–5	10–9	3–4	5–1	12–8
Miami	1–6	5–14	2–5	5–2	4–2	4–2	—	2–5	7–12	8–11	1–4	2–5	4–3	3–3	6–13	9–11
Milwaukee	5–1	4–3	9–11	13–6	5–2	3–4	5–2	—	4–3	3–3	7–12	4–2	6–1	11–8	4–2	13–7
New York	5–2	6–13	1–6	3–3	1–6	2–4	12–7	3–4	—	11–8	3–4	4–2	4–3	3–3	11–8	8–12
Philadelphia	2–4	7–12	2–4	4–3	2–5	4–3	11–8	3–3	8–11	—	6–1	3–3	4–3	4–3	8–11	12–8
Pittsburgh	1–6	1–5	9–10	14–5	3–3	1–5	4–1	12–7	4–3	1–6	—	3–4	4–3	8–11	2–5	15–5
San Diego	7–12	3–4	2–5	4–3	8–11	5–14	5–2	2–4	2–4	3–3	4–3	—	8–11	4–3	2–4	7–13
San Francisco	11–8	3–3	3–3	2–4	7–12	9–10	3–4	1–6	3–4	3–4	3–4	11–8	—	2–5	4–2	8–12
St. Louis	3–3	2–4	10–9	12–7	5–2	4–3	3–3	8–11	3–3	3–4	11–8	3–4	5–2	—	5–2	11–9
Washington	5–2	9–10	3–4	6–1	2–5	1–5	13–6	2–4	8–11	11–8	5–2	4–2	2–4	2–5	—	9–11

The October 1 tiebreaker games were regular-season games that are included here.

== Regular season summary ==
The Cardinals announced their 2018 schedule on September 12, 2017. They opened on the road versus the New York Mets on March 29, their earliest date ever. A day off and then the March 31 and April 1 games completed that series. It marked the first time the Cardinals have opened the season at Citi Field, and the team's first opener in New York since 1996, when the Mets still played at Shea Stadium. They hosted the Arizona D-backs in their home opener on April 5. First pitch at Busch Stadium that day is scheduled for 6:15 p.m. CT. The Cardinals were also slated to finish the season at Wrigley Field, marking the first time the Cardinals and Cubs would end the regular season against each other in Chicago since 1991. MLB pushed up the start of the 2018 season in order to accommodate the addition of four extra off-days during the six-month season.

=== Busch Stadium ranking ===
Busch Stadium ranked third out of the 30 baseball stadiums by Forbes magazine on March 19. The methodology includes: overall aesthetics of the ballpark design, including integration with additional structures, such as in Baltimore and San Diego; its setting; the visuals from within the seating bowl or surrounding views; the amenities offered at the facility; historic relevance; and external development that adds to the experience. AT&T Park (San Francisco Giants), and Oriole Park (Baltimore Orioles) were one and two, respectively. Maury Brown ranked Busch Stadium third, "thanks to the incredible views of the Gateway Arch and downtown St. Louis."

=== Rawlings sold ===
St. Louis County-based Rawlings Sporting Goods (est. 1887) is sold from Newell Brands, announced on June 5, to a Los Angeles private equity firm, Seidler Equity Partners (SEP) owning LA Fitness, with MLB a co-investor in the $395 million deal. Rawlings employs 150 people in the St. Louis area, and 1,200 globally. The deal is expected to close by mid-July. Rawlings previously made some custom baseball gloves at its plant in Washington, Missouri, but no longer makes any baseball gloves in the United States, with the factory open.

=== Opening Day ===
As expected, Carlos Martinez was named on March 10 to start on Opening Day, March 29. Few aces are as undisputed as Martinez, who set career highs in starts, complete games, innings and strikeouts last season, when he made his second National League All-Star team. It will be his second consecutive Opening Day start.

Opening Day did not go as planned with a disappointing loss to the New York Mets, 4–9. Carlos Martinez walked six, hit another batter, gave up five hits, and allowed five runs in 4 1/3 innings. Rookie reliever Jordan Hicks made his major-league debut, giving up an infield hit, but getting a double-play ball and then an inning-ending strikeout, his first.

=== March ===
The Cardinals found a closer in free agent Greg Holland (RHP), 32, reaching agreement with him a few hours before the first pitch on Opening Day. Making it official is contingent on him passing a physical. Holland signed a one-year deal for a reported $14 million. He led the NL with 41 saves last season with the Colorado Rockies, and had a 3.61 ERA in an MLB-best 58 games finished. He signed for less than the qualifying offer the Rockies offered this past winter, and the Cardinals lose a draft pick. Holland missed all of 2016, recovering from Tommy John surgery. He recorded 166 saves in four seasons before the injury, including an NL-best 41 in 2017 with the Rockies. He won the NL's Comeback Player of the Year Award last season. He owns a 2.60 ERA over 377 career innings, and has struck out 11.9 per 9 IP over the course of his seven-year career. He went 3–6 with a 3.61 ERA for Colorado last season, when he struck out 70 batters in 57 1/3 innings. His numbers took a dive after the 2017 All-Star break. He saved 28 games with a 1.62 ERA in the first half, but saved only 13 with a 6.38 ERA in 26 games after it. In another last-minute change, the Cardinals decided on March 31 to make room for the now-finalized Holland purchase by delaying Alex Reyes return in changing his 10-day DL to the 60-day DL, which makes him ineligible to return until May 28. Holland was optioned to the High-A Palm Beach team for a required minimum of 10 days. Brett Cecil (LH reliever) was placed on the DL.

In another move on March 31, the team traded Josh Lucas (RH) to the Oakland A's for pitching prospect Casey Meinser (RH), 22, presently at the AA level. Lucas was DFA'd prior.

For MARCH, the team played two games, with a 0–2 record, scoring 6 runs, giving up 15.

=== April ===
On April 1, the Cardinals traded previously-DFA'd INF Breyvic Valera to the Los Angeles Dodgers for Johan Mieses (OF), 22. Mieses led the California League (High-A) with 28 home runs in 2016. He excelled at Class A Advanced (High-A) again last season, but struggled after a promotion to AA-Tulsa (Texas League), where he hit .160/.246/.347 over 90 games. He has been assigned to High-A Palm Beach.

Jack Flaherty, 22, was optioned to AAA-Memphis on April 4, after pitching a masterful game at Milwaukee the night before. He struck out nine, and allowed one run over five innings against them. Adam Wainwright, 36, will return from the DL to make his first start, the home opener on (Thu.) April 5. He is a three-time All-Star over 12 seasons for the Birds. He missed six games and one start while on the disabled list.

Ryan Sherriff, suffered a right great toe fracture from a hit ball on April 5, landing on the DL on April 8. John Brebbia was recalled from AAA-Memphis.

A bench-clearing incident that started with a vulgarity to Yadier Molina from Arizona Diamondbacks' manager Torey Lovullo in the second inning of the April 8 game, led to the ejection of only the manager. He was suspended for arguing balls and strikes on A.J. Pollock, with Molina suspended for making contact with home plate umpire Tim Timmons. Molina is appealing and will play until his appeal is heard; managers cannot appeal. On April 10, MLB gave one-game suspensions to both, and the manager was fined. Umpire Timmons said the contact from Molina was incidental in going after the manager, and that is why he was not ejected. Crew chief Mike Winters said all details will be on his report, including the specific expletive used. Molina dropped his suspension appeal on the morning of April 11 for that afternoon game, and sat out the rubber game of the Brewers' series. Manager Matheny had planned to rest Molina, his first off-day after 11 consecutive games played from the start of the season, as it was a day game after a night game.

Greg Holland was recalled on April 9, with Mike Mayers optioned to AAA, with Holland making his Cardinals' debut that evening.

Sam Tuivailala was placed on the DL on April 12, with a left knee sprain, Mike Mayers was recalled.

On April 13, at the end of the fifth inning against Cincinnati in Cincinnati, Yadier Molina passed the Reds' catching icon Johnny Bench for 13th place in MLB history, having caught 14,489.1 innings in his 15-year career. With the remaining four innings, Molina has 14,493.1 innings as catcher. Former Cardinals' catcher Ted Simmons is next on the list in 12th place, with 15,692.1 innings. The top catcher for innings is Iván Rodríguez, with 20,347.1 innings. Greg Garcia had his first career multi-homer day with two, plus a double, giving him 10 total bases, another career high. He had two home runs in 133 at-bats in 2017.

Jedd Gyorko and Luke Gregerson were activated from the DL on April 16, before the night's postponed game at Wrigley Field, that was to be nationally televised on ESPN. Mike Mayers and Yairo Munoz were optioned to AAA-Memphis.

RH-hitting OF Tyler O'Neill, 22, the #4 prospect for the Cardinals, was promoted to the majors before the April 19 game. John Brebbia was optioned to AAA. O'Neill enjoyed a torrid start at Memphis, which owns one of the best records in the Pacific Coast League. He hit .246/.321/.499 with 31 home runs in his first season at Triple-A in 2017. O'Neill is tied for the Minor League league in home runs with six, and presently hitting .388/.385/.837 with 18 RBIs across 12 games. Oblique and hamstring injuries limited O'Neill to just 12 at bats in Grapefruit League play this spring. He might be the strongest man in baseball, squatting 585 pounds (265 kg). He is the sixth Canadian-born (Burnaby, British Columbia) player currently on a big league roster, joining Nick Pivetta, Russell Martin, Joey Votto, James Paxton and John Axford. He made his major league debut later that day, striking out in his one at-bat as a pinch-hitter.

Reliever Jordan Hicks got his first career win, pitching 2.1 innings, with a game-ending double play with the bases jammed on April 21, the team's sixth win in six games against Cincinnati this season, and the 10th consecutive win against the NL Central's last-place team, MLBs worst team, now 3–17 (.150). The last two losses by the Reds came after their previous manager, Bryan Price was dismissed after their April 18 loss in a dismal 3–15 (.167) start, in favor of interim manager Jim Riggleman. Price was 279–387 (.419) with the Reds in his five years as manager.

Adam Wainwright, 36, goes on the DL for the second time this season on April 22 (retroactive to April 20), with a right elbow inflammation. He has a history of elbow issues. He is 1–2, with a 3.45 ERA. He was scheduled to start on April 24, but with the team enjoying off-days on April 23 and April 30, reliever John Brebbia was recalled, team can get by with four starters.

Jedd Gyorko hit his 100th career home run, and reliever John Brebbia got his first save in the 9–1 win against the New York Mets on April 25.

For the month of APRIL, the club was 15–10 (.600), scoring 120 runs, giving up 86 in the 25 games, but ending the month on a three-game losing streak (at Pittsburgh) that dropped them out of first place in the NL Central, now in fourth place. For the season they are 15–12 (.556) 1 1/2 games out of first, with Chicago in first, followed by Pittsburgh (1/2 game behind), and Milwaukee (1.0 game behind) ahead of them'. For 2018, scored 126 runs, giving up 101 in their 27 games.

=== May ===
Manager Mike Matheny managed his 1,000th game on May 1, joining Tony La Russa, Red Schoendienst, and Whitey Herzog as managers of the Cardinals. Matheny's .560 winning percentage is the best of the four through 1,000 games, and the fifth-best in MLB since 1976. Matt Carpenter helped Matheny celebrate with his 100th career home run in the ninth, tying the game, leading to a win later that inning. Carpenter was hitting .155/.305/.274 going into the game.

The game after Matheny's 1,000th, Yadier Molina on May 2, passed Johnny Bench with his 1,743rd game catching, 16th all-time on the MLB catcher's list. Molina got the walk-off hit to win the May 1 game. He passed Bench on the career innings-caught list in April. In that May 2 game, starter Carlos Martinez hit his first career home run in the sixth inning, giving the team a 1–0 lead. It was only his seventh extra-base hit (six doubles) in a previous 227 plate appearances. He had not hit a batter for the first time this season, and for the first time in eight starts dating back to last year. The seven-game streak with at least one hit batsman tied for the third longest in baseball history. He earned his third win against one loss in seven starts, with a 1.40 ERA. In the next inning, Dexter Fowler hit a two-run home run, giving them a 3–0 lead that held up for a 3–2 win. It was his career 100th home run. He was hitting .161 before that at-bat.

Relievers Sam Tuivailala (R) and Ryan Sherriff (L) were both activated from the DL before the May 4 game. Austin Gomber (P) and Luke Voit (1B) were optioned to AAA.

A few minutes after the end of the May 4 game, former Cardinals' superstar Albert Pujols, 38, playing 1B, became the 32nd major leaguer to get to the coveted 3,000 hit level with his Los Angeles Angels, against the home Seattle Mariners. He lined out in the first, walked and scored in the fourth, and got his 3,000th on a line drive single to right field in the fifth inning off former Cardinals' starter Mike Leake. He later added another hit for 3,001 surpassing the late Roberto Clemente (who was also 38 in his 3,000th and last hit of his career in 1972), for 31st place with his 33rd hit (129 AB) of 2018 in his 31st game. Pujols got 2,073 hits with the Cardinals (2001–2011), and 928 hits over the past 6 1/6 seasons. His 620 home runs rank seventh all-time. He is now hitting .256/.284/.450 (.733 OPS), with 6 HR, 19 RBI in 2018.

Catcher Yadier Molina had an injury to the groin from a foul tip in the ninth inning of the wild afternoon game on May 5, with the Cardinals winning 8–6 in 10 innings after trailing early 0–4, and then 4–6 in the ninth, for the biggest comeback of the season. He underwent surgery that evening, and is expected to miss a month. He was hitting .272/.292/.456 (.748 OPS), with six home runs and 17 RBIs. It was revealed the following day that Molina had a traumatic hematoma that needed immediate medical help. He was placed on the DL and Carson Kelly, 23, was recalled from Memphis. Dominic Leone (RH) reliever injured his right bicep and was also placed on the DL, with Mike Mayers recalled.

The first-place Cardinals, up by just 1/2 in the NL Central at 19–12, and 2 1/2 over the third-place Cubs had won the first two of the three-game series at Busch against their arch-rivals. Going for the sweep in the nationally televised ESPN game on May 6, they did it with their second consecutive extra-inning win after trailing in their half of the inning, with a two-run home run. This night in a 14-inning 4–3 victory that featured a 30-minute rain delay in the first inning, and a 29-minute rain delay with the team batting in the third inning of the official 4:46 contest. Kolten Wong hit the first triple in the season after 31 games for the team without one, that tied the game at 2-all in the sixth inning. They were the last team in the majors to have a triple. After the Cubs went ahead in the 14th 3–2 with a home run, the Cardinals stormed back in the bottom half after two outs, with an infield single by Harrison Bader, followed by a two-strike game-winning home run by the .156 hitting former Cub Dexter Fowler, who was 0-for-5 before the hit, to complete the sweep and their fifth consecutive win; still unbeaten in May. The win pushed them to a season-high eight games over .500 at 20–12 (.625), and a 1 1/2 game lead over second-place Milwaukee (20–15), 2 1/2 over surprising third-place Pittsburgh (19–16), and 3 1/2 over the 16–15 Cubs with 14 games remaining against them head-to-head.

Former Cardinals' outfielder Stephen Piscotty received condolences from MLB, his former team, and his current team (Oakland A's) after his mother Gretchen died of ALS on Sunday, May 6, at 55. The Cardinals traded Piscotty this past off-season in part so he could be closer to his family and help care for his mother, who was diagnosed with ALS in May 2017. The trade meant Piscotty would play home games just a short drive from his hometown of Pleasanton, California.

Ace starter Carlos Martinez was placed on the DL with a right lat strain, on May 10. Martinez was leading the NL with a 1.62 ERA, and led the Cardinals with 50 innings and 47 strikeouts. Mike Mayers was recalled.

On May 11, the Cardinals activated Brett Cecil (LH) reliever from the DL, and placed Tyler Lyons (LH) reliever on the DL (retroactive to May 9) with a mid back strain. Lyons co-leads the team with 18 relief appearances, having a 1–0 record and 6.17 ERA.

A season-high five home runs (13 hits) against San Diego (now 14–26, .350 last in NL West) on May 11, in a 9–5 win, was the most for the Cardinals since June 16, 2017 against Baltimore. The three home runs in one inning (3rd) was the first time since April 6, 2012, with Carlos Beltran, Matt Holliday, and David Freese. The five home runs were by, in order: Paul DeJong (3-run HR, 2nd inn.), Harrison Bader (3rd inn.), Marcell Ozuna (3rd inn.), Jedd Gyorko (3rd inn., and his 8th in 12 games against S.D.), and Tommy Pham (2-run HR, 6th inn.). Gyorko was a former Padre, and is now batting .525 (21-for-40), prior to this game at .500, against his former team. Gyorko has 19 RBIs against his former team, and is being paid $2.5 million by the Padres. Petco Park had a very low HR index of 81, Batting Average of 92, and Runs at 83, in 2017, compared to the average NL park of 100. Busch Stadium's index numbers in 2017 were: 86 (HR), 99 (BA), and 89 (R).

Adam Wainwright was activated from the DL on May 13 after missing 17 games (4 starts) with elbow inflammation. John Brebbia was optioned.

For the third time in less than two months, Adam Wainwright, 36, was placed on the DL, the second time with right elbow inflammation, on May 15. He pitched 2 1/3 IP with a career-high six walks, and three hits on May 13. Jack Flaherty, 22, was recalled to start on May 15.

RH-reliever Luke Gregerson has a right shoulder impingement, placing him on the DL before the May 16 afternoon game. He pitched 1/3 IP the night before, giving up two runs. John Brebbia was recalled.

Former Cardinals' starter Lance Lynn, 31 on May 12 (wearing uniform #31), makes a start on May 16 against his former team, for the Minnesota Twins (AL), at Target Field. Lynn is 1–3, with a 7.34 ERA, in seven starts (164 batters faced), giving up 43 hits (6 HR), 25 walks, and 36 strikeouts in 34 1/3 innings for a 1.98 WHIP. Batters are hitting .312/.415/.522 (.936 OPS) against him. He is 6' 5" and 280 pounds. The Cardinals beat their former teammate, 7–5, with Lynn only pitching three innings, giving up four hits and three runs. He walked four and struck out five. His ERA is now 7.47 with a 1–4 record. At the one-quarter mark for 2018, the team is 23–17 (.575), third place in the NL Central, one game behind Pittsburgh (25–17, .595) and Milwaukee (26–18, .591) tied for first, with the Cubs at 22–18 (.550), two games behind. Cincinnati is far behind in fifth place 15–29 (.341).

Another player goes on the disabled list: Carson Kelly (C) was the one on May 17, with a right hamstring strain. AAA-Memphis catcher Steven Baron, 27, was recalled. To make room for Baron on the 40-man roster, Adam Wainwright was moved to the 60-day DL, with more tests planned after a number of them failed to reveal the source of pain in his reconstructed right elbow,. Kelly, 23, is 2-for-18 (.111) with one RBI at the plate in eight games. He joins seven other Cardinals on the DL, four others and Kelly in the past week. Baron signed as a Minor League free agent in December 2017, and returns the Majors for the first time since he appeared in four games for the Mariners in 2015. In 2018 at Memphis, he was hitting .153/.167/.186 with two doubles and two RBIs in 17 games.

May 18 saw two more Cardinals added to the long disabled list. Matt Bowman (RHP) has blisters on his right index and middle fingers. Paul DeJong (SS) has a fractured left hand after hit by a pitch in the eighth inning of the previous night's game. Yairo Munoz (INF) and Tyler O'Neill (OF) were recalled. The team now has 10 players on the disabled list.

A season-high 15 hits, and second-highest 12 runs in a 1-hour 35-minute rain delayed game, led to a 12–4 win over the Philadelphia Phillies, May 18. Rookie OF'er Tyler O'Neill got his first major league hit. Starter Michael Wacha got his fifth win, tying him with Miles Mikolas for the team lead.

Jack Flaherty, 22, was dominant in a 13-strikeout performance in 7 2/3 innings in a 5–1 win at Busch Stadium on a May 20 afternoon game. He gave up only two hits, including a home run in the fourth inning, walking only one. He allowed only three baserunners in 26 batters faced, a personal high of 120 pitches; 80 for strikes. It was his first major league win, after a 0–1 start over three previous starts totaling 15 2/3 innings and 14 strikeouts. His ERA dropped to 2.31 and his WHIP from 1.34 to 1.03 leading all Cardinals' starters along with his 10.4 K's per nine. OF'er Tyler O'Neill hit his second home run in as many days, his first career home run in the May 19 game. Flaherty also got his first major league hit, a single in the third inning. His 13 strikeouts were the most since Carlos Martinez struck out the same number on Aug. 29, 2016. The 13 K's also were the most ever by a Cardinals' pitcher in his first 10 games, and the most this year.

Another highlight occurred in the ninth inning of that May 20 game, when reliever Jordan Hicks, 21, fired off the five fastest pitches of any pitcher in 2018. His sinker was recorded as high as 105 mph, passing Aroldis Chapman of the New York Yankees. In the previous May 19 game, he hit 103 on the radar gun for his fastest recorded pitch. Hicks owns eight of the 10 fastest pitches, and 13 of the top 20 this year. He and Chapman are the only two pitchers to hit 105 mph since Statcast began tracking pitches in 2008. Hicks twice hit 105 mph in that ninth inning against the one opposing hitter.

The next game, against the cross-state Kansas City Royals on May 21, brought the team its first complete game, shutout of the season. Miles Mikolas went the full nine innings, giving up only four hits, walking one, striking out nine, in facing only 31 batters. He remains perfect at 6–0. It was his first major-league complete game and shutout. Playing in RF, Tyler O'Neill continued his hot hitting, complementing Mikolas' strong pitching. O'Neill hit his third home run in as many games, a three-run blast, and later added a double, driving in his fourth run of the night. He was 2-for-4, hitting .368/.409/.895 (7-for-19, one double, one walk, one hit-by-pitch, five strikeouts, and a sacrifice fly, five runs scored), for a terrific 1.304 OPS, with seven RBIs in only his 10th major league game. Matt Carpenter continued his breakout at-bats in the last six games from a season-long slump, going 3-for-4, including a double and his fourth home run. He is now hitting .210 with a .722 OPS after hitting a career low .140 after his first 39 games. Marcell Ozuna had the other RBI in the game, in a 2-for-3 night; now hitting .241 with a .607 OPS. Carpenter has hit 13-for-24 (.542) in his last six games including seven doubles and his fourth home run.

In a good news report for the Cardinals #1 prospect on May 21, it was decided that disabled pitcher Alex Reyes will join the starting rotation instead of going to the bullpen, when he comes off the 60-day list on May 28. He has had three rehabilitation assignments, with his final fourth scheduled for May 24, at AAA-Memphis. He will be prepped to possibly start the May 29 game against the Milwaukee Brewers at their home park. He enjoyed great success in his previous assignment, going 7 2/3 innings at AA-Springfield, striking out 12. His final rehab start at AAA-Memphis on May 24, resulted in 13 strikeouts, including nine consecutively, in the win after 7 innings and 90 pitches, giving up only one hit, no runs, and two baserunners. He threw 23 scoreless innings across four rehab starts at four different levels. He struck out 44 and walked seven (82 batters faced), going 3–0. Reyes' major league start will be his first since Sept. 29, 2016. He went 4–1 with a 1.57 ERA in 12 appearances (five starts) in 2016, before injuring his right elbow in the spring of 2017. When Carlos Martinez returns from the DL, the team will have three high-powered arms: Reyes, Jack Flaherty, and Luke Weaver, fighting for two spots. Reyes, 23, will make his return start on Wednesday, May 30, the final series game against the Milwaukee Brewers, another team fighting for first-place in the NL Central. That game is televised only to active Facebook users, with no other networks allowed. The Cardinals are not planning any special restrictions on Reyes compared to any other of their pitchers. In delaying his return to the end of May by placing him on the 60-day DL, the club doesn't foresee having to shut him down for the post-season, if the Cardinals were to get there.

Carson Kelly (C) and LH-reliever Tyler Lyons are activated from the DL before the afternoon May 26 game at Pittsburgh. Reliever Greg Holland was placed on the DL with a right hip impingement. Steven Baron (C) was optioned to AAA.

Alex Reyes, 23, returned to the active roster after missing all 52 games played while on the 60-day DL until his May 30 activation and starter against the NL Central Division leading Milwaukee Brewers. Dominic Leone (RH-reliever) was moved to the 60-day DL to make room on the 40-man roster, while Mike Mayers was optioned to make room on the 25-man roster. The 12:10pm game is not on any television network, only viewed on the Facebook platform, for the second time this season, on April 11, also against the Brewers. It is broadcast on KMOX radio, the flagship station. His first game back from Tommy John surgery did not go as expected. He was removed after only four innings, facing 15 batters in throwing only 73 pitches. He gave up no runs, but walked two and gave up three hits, striking out two. He was removed for a pinch-hitter in the fifth inning, with the team suffering the second loss in three games to the NL Central Division leaders (36–21), now trailing them by five games; three on the loss side at 29–24.

After pitching his four innings, Reyes was again placed on the DL (10-day) the next day, May 31, with a right lat strain. LH-reliever Austin Gomber, 24, was recalled. He was 4–3 with a 3.60 ERA in nine starts at AAA-Memphis. He was Pacific Coast League Pitcher of the Week last week. John Gant (P) and Tyler O'Neill (OF) were optioned, with Mike Mayers (P) recalled, as was !B Luke Voit. Voit was batting .237 with one homer and 12 RBIs in 34 games.

The Cardinals placed more players on the DL in May than any of the other 29 major league teams, with 11. The New York Mets placed eight, and the Detroit Tigers (AL) placed seven.

For the month of MAY, the club was 15–12 (.556), scoring 111 runs, giving up 111 in the 27 games, but ending the month on a thrilling, rare, come-from-behind (5 runs) win in the ninth, 10–8 at home against Pittsburgh. Exactly after 1/3rd of the season, they are 30–24 (.556) 4 1/2 games out of first, with Milwaukee in first (36–21), followed by Chicago 4 games behind (30–23), and then the Cardinals, with Pittsburgh 6 1/2 games behind (29–27), and Cincinnati 16 games back (20–37). For 2018, scored 237 runs, giving up 212 in their 54 games.

=== June ===
Austin Gomber (LH-reliever), 24, made his major league debut on June 2, pitching three scoreless innings (sixth-through-eighth) giving up no hits, walking one, striking out two and inducing a double play. Kolten Wong hit his second walk-off HR of the year, to lead the team to a 3–2 win over the Pirates, who hold a 5–4 advantage with the fourth game of the weekend (Th.-Sun.) on June 3, out of 19 head-to-head. Marcell Ozuna hit his 100th career home run, fourth of the season, and first as a Cardinal at Busch Stadium. The Cardinals lead the majors in 2018 with seven walk-off wins, with five of them via the home run. The game also marked the 1,000th game at this Busch Stadium III since its opening in 2006. The Cardinals are 590–410 at home in that span, with their .590 home winning percentage ranking third behind only the L.A. Dodgers and N.Y. Yankees since 2006.

Michael Wacha pitched eight scoreless no-hit innings at Busch Stadium on June 3, against the Pirates in the finale of their four-game set, taking three of four. Wacha's bid for a no-hitter was broken up by a pinch-hit single in the ninth, the 27th batter Wacha faced. Wacha gave up two earlier walks, striking out eight, throwing 111 pitches (74 strikes), now 7–1, 2.41 ERA. He was relieved by Jordan Hicks for the three outs to finish a team shutout, 5–0, with Marcell Ozuna's first-inning grand slam giving Wacha all the runs he would need. In 2013 (Sep. 24) as a 22-year-old rookie, he came within an out of no-hitting the Washington Nationals. The last Cardinals' no-hitter was September 3, 2001, by Bud Smith against the San Diego Padres.

June 5, gave the team its star pitcher Carlos Martinez, and its star catcher Yadier Molina from the disabled list. Other roster changes include optioning reliever Mike Mayers, placing INF Greg Garcia on the paternity list, DFA backup catcher Steven Baron, and purchasing the contract of RH-reliever Preston Guilmet from AAA-Memphis.

Alex Reyes underwent season-ending surgery to reattach a tendon in his right lat on June 6. He pitched four innings and 73 pitches on May 30 before being removed. LH-reliever Ryan Sherriff also underwent Tommy John surgery on June 5, losing him for the remainder of the season. He made five appearances with the team in 2018, allowing four runs over 5 2/3 innings of relief.

Albert Fred "Red" Schoendienst, wore the Cardinals' uniform longer than anybody else in the franchise's long and storied history, 67 years, with a total of 76 years in professional baseball in 2018. He died at his home in Town and Country, Missouri on June 6, 2018, at 95. The Germantown, Illinois native was part of baseball as a player (1945–56, 1961–63), coach (1964, 1979–95), manager (1965–76) and interim manager (1980, 1990) had been in his current executive role with the team since 1996. He was the oldest living member of the National Baseball Hall of Fame, inducted in 1989.

LH-reliever Tyler Lyons was placed on the DL with a left elbow strain, June 8, and recalled Mike Mayers for the sixth time.

Daniel Poncedeleon (RH-starter) 26, is recalled, after a shocking fractured skull in May 2017 at AAA-Memphis from a line drive that hit him in the right temple. He was 5–2, 2.41 ERA with 49 hits, 2 HR, 35 walks, 71 strikeouts in 12 games (11 starts) for a 1.41 WHIP and .222 O-BA over 59 2/3 IP. He will become the fifth player to make his MLB debut for the Cardinals this season and the 23rd pitcher summoned to St. Louis. In 2017, the team used 25 pitchers in the season. Luke Voit (1B) optioned.

Red Schoendienst, will have his public funeral mass on Friday, June 15, at Cathedral Basilica of St. Louis, at 10am. It will be broadcast on KPLR-TV11. The Cardinals most consistent hitter, #3 in the lineup José Martínez will be on the paternity list, fly to his native Venezuela, and will miss the three-game weekend series with the Cubs (June 15–17) to attend the birth of his second child. He is hitting 322/.391/.522 with 10 HR and 42 RBIs. Luke Voit will replace him at 1B. Red Schoendienst's life was celebrated at a two-hour Mass, with eulogies given by owner Bill DeWitt Jr., broadcaster and player for Red, Mike Shannon, Hall of Fame president Jeff Idelson, and Red's daughter Colleen.

Matt Bowman was activated before the critical three-game Cubs series on June 15, restoring the full 25-man active roster. He missed 25 games since May 18. Daniel Poncedeleon was optioned, without getting into any games of the three while on the active roster.

Yadier Molina tied Gabby Hartnett's record of 1,756 games caught for one team on June 17. Hartnett played 19 years, Molina is in his 15th year. John Brebbia recorded his first major league win, salvaging the ESPN-televised final game (5–0) of the three with the Cubs (40–28). The Cardinals (37–32) are 3 1/2 games behind them for second, with Milwaukee 1/2 game ahead (42–29) in the Central Division. He set the major league record of 1,757 games caught for one team in the next game, June 18, and will continue to add for each game caught for the Cardinals until his expected retirement after the 2020 season.

Marcell Ozuna, 27, was named NL Player of the Week for the week of June 11–17. Ozuna hit .455/.478/1.000 (10-for-22, 1.478 OPS) with four home runs and eight RBIs in six games last week, raising his average from .282 to .294. He hit .260/.308/.337 (.645 OPS) with three home runs in the first two months of the season (50 games), and he is slashing .411/.450/.821 (1.271 OPS) with seven homers through 15 games in June.

A franchise record 19 strikeouts for Cardinals' batters was one reason for a frustrating 5–6 loss in 10-inn. at Philadelphia on June 18, after fighting back to a 5–4 lead in the top of the 10th until 2-outs in the bottom of that inning. Miles Mikolas started the game, and after the first inning, trailed 0–4, with the Cardinals striking out during the game at a rate rarely seen in their 126-year NL history. The team trailed with 2-outs in the top of the 9th with a runner on third base, when a third strike on Yairo Munoz eluded the Phillies' catcher, allowing Yadier Molina to score and the Cardinals to tie it at 4–4. They went ahead in the 10th from a solo Tommy Pham home run, happily setting up for a remarkable come-from-behind win in the bottom half. But reliever Matt Bowman could not get the third out after issuing a hit, and then after an out moved him to second, manager Matheny ordered an intentional walk to their best hitter, Carlos Santana. The next batter made the second out, but Aaron Altherr delivered the crushing blow: a sinking, game-winning double to left that Marcell Ozuna came within inches of catching in a dive for it that would have ended the game in a 5–4 win for the Birds. Ozuna later said he would have caught it if it hadn't sunk at the last moment. Statcast said he had only a 4% chance of catching it, having to cover 47 feet toward the left-field line in only 3.1 seconds. It was the Cardinals' fifth loss in six games.

Matt Bowman was placed back on the DL with blisters on his middle finger June 19, only four days after re-activated from the DL due to blistering. Greg Holland was activated from the DL to take his place.

In the June 20 game, Michael Wacha strained his left oblique in the fourth inning at Philadelphia. He is likely headed to the disabled list. He was off to the best start of his career as he entered the day 8–2 with a 3.24 ERA. He was added to the DL on June 21. John Gant, 25, was recalled for the third time. He is 5–1, 1.65 ERA, with 42 strikeouts in 49 IP in eight starts at AAA-Memphis.

John Gant, replacing the injured Michael Wacha in the rotation, threw a one-hit shutout for seven innings against the AL Cleveland Indians on June 25, after a 1-hour 21-min rain delay. Gant gave up the strange infield hit when the ground ball in the second inning hit the third base bag, bouncing high in the air, making a throw to first impossible to retire the batter. Bud Norris got his 15th save. The 4–0 win, the team's third consecutive, snapped the Indians' seven-game winning streak who outscored their opponents 54–9 in those games. Their 41st win (36 losses) also was significant as the 10,000th NL win for the Cardinals in their 127 years in that league's play, becoming the sixth team to do so. Gant had only one win of the previous 9,999 until his brilliant second win. The franchise is credited with 10,780 total wins counting the 10 years 1882–1891 in the American Association league, joining the NL in 1892. The other NL teams are the Atlanta Braves, Chicago Cubs, San Francisco Giants, Pittsburgh Pirates, and Los Angeles Dodgers. Since joining the NL in 1892, only the Giants, Dodgers, and Yankees have won more games.

Matt Carpenter, had a career night in a five-for-five game with three RBIs on June 26. The team had to endure another rain delay: this delay was five minutes longer than last night's game, 1-hour 26-minutes, but buried the Indians in an 11–2 rout, with 13 hits, for the team's fourth straight win (42–36). Cleveland's ace Corey Kluber suffered the shortest start of his career in 1.2 innings, giving up six runs, six hits including two home runs. He is now 11–4 in 2018. Jose Martinez hit a three-run home run to end Kluber's night to highlight a five-run second inning, that boosted them to a 6–2 lead they would not relinquish. Carpenter's night included two singles, a double, and bookend home runs in the first and eighth innings. His leadoff home run was the 18th of his career, trailing only Lou Brock's 21 in Cardinals' history. it was his second career five-for-five game, and he became the first Cardinals' player to have five hits, five runs, and two home runs in a game. For the month of June over the past 20 games, he has eight home runs, scored 22, with 15 RBIs, and jumped his average from .140 to .259.

On June 29, the Cardinals claimed LH-reliever, Tyler Webb, 27, off-waivers from the San Diego Padres. Webb has been assigned to AAA-Memphis. To make room for him on the 40-man roster, Alex Reyes was transferred to the 60-day disabled list.

For the month of JUNE, the team was 12–15 (.444), scoring 108 runs, giving up 126 in the 27 games. Exactly at the half-way mark of the season (HOME: 23–21, AWAY: 19–18), they are 42–39 (.519) 5 1/2 games out of first, with Milwaukee in first (48–34), followed by Chicago 1 1/2 games behind (46–35), and then the Cardinals, with Pittsburgh 9 games behind (39–43), and Cincinnati 13 1/2 games back (35–48). For 2018, scored 345 runs, giving up 338 in their 81 games.

=== July ===
Dexter Fowler was given a three-day paternity leave on July 2, for the impending birth of his second child. Tyler O'Neill was recalled from Triple-A Memphis, where he was hitting .304 with 19 home runs and 48 RBI. With the Cardinals in 2018, he hit .237 with three home runs.

The team acquired Philadelphia Phillies Double-A-level Elniery García, 23, a lefty starter, for a portion of their $5-million international spending purse on July 5. He is 0–6 with a 6.38 ERA in 10 games (nine starts). In 42 1/3 innings, he's allowed 30 earned runs (and 11 unearned runs) to go with 21 walks against 29 strikeouts. The lefty has also been on and off the disabled list most of the season with foot and leg injuries, presently on the disabled list with turf toe.

Dexter Fowler was activated from his three-day paternity leave on July 5. Matt Bowman was activated from the disabled list, and optioned to AAA-Memphis. Tyler O'Neill was placed on the disabled list with a left groin sprain.

SS Paul DeJong was activated from the disabled list on July 6, after missing 45 games since May 18. RH-reliever Austin Gomber was optioned to AAA-Memphis. RF Harrison Bader and INF-SS Yairo Munoz were kept. Munoz hit in 40 games (32 starts) batting .302/.341/.429. with four home runs, and 19 RBIs.

Starting pitcher Miles Mikolas (10–3, 2.65 ERA as of July 8) was picked to represent the Cardinals for the NL pitching staff in the 2018 All-Star Game on July 17 in Washington, D.C.'s Nationals Park. As he will be starting the Sunday (July 15) prior to the All-Star Game, so by the rules on starting pitchers who pitch that Sunday he will not pitch, taken off the official roster and replaced, but still be invited at Nationals Park for the festivities. This his first official All-Star Game. His wife suddenly went into labor, with twins, earlier than expected, prompting Mikolas to fly to his home in Jupiter, Florida from Washington, D.C., on Monday, July 16, and miss all the All-Star Game festivities.

Catcher Yadier Molina, 35 (36 on July 13) replaces Buster Posey on the July 17 All-Star Game roster, due to Posey's ailing hip. It will be the ninth time Molina has made an All-Star roster. This ties Bob Gibson and Albert Pujols, each of whom earned nine such selections as Cardinals. Only Joe Medwick (10), Red Schoendienst (10), Enos Slaughter (10), Ken Boyer (11), Ozzie Smith (14), and Stan Musial (24) had more. Since his first All-Star selection in 2009, Molina has been left off the NL roster only once. Molina is in the midst of his best offensive season since 2012, when he finished fourth in the NL Most Valuable Player vote. His .500 slugging percentage ranks second-best among NL catchers, and he's tied for the league lead among catchers with 13 home runs. He ranks fourth at his position in both batting average (.279) and RBIs (38).

Luke Gregerson (R) and Tyler Lyons (L) were activated from the DL on July 13. Gregerson missed 52 games, Lyons 31. Starter Luke Weaver and reliever John Brebbia were optioned. With off-days from the All-Star Game, the team won't need five starters until after the break. John Gant shifted from starter to bullpen.

After two consecutive lopsided home losses to the last-place in the Central Division Cincinnati Reds (43–52 .453) dropping the team to 47–46 (.505) in third place, now seven games behind the division leading Cubs (53–38 .582) and second place Milwaukee Brewers (55–42 .567) by six games, with the Pirates right behind them in fourth place at 47–49 (.490), the Cardinals dismissed manager Mike Matheny that July 14 (Saturday) night, the day before the final game before the All-Star break. Also dismissed were hitting coach John Mabry and assistant hitting coach Bill Mueller. Bench coach Mike Shildt will take over as interim manager. Matheny since his hiring, managed from 2012. His record after 1,065 games was 591–474 (.555). His record after the first four years was 375–273 (.579), but these last 2.57 years his record was only 216–201 (.518). The team leads all of MLB with a lowest .978 fielding average, and 75 errors (92 games; now 77, with 2 more in game 93), with the NL team average making 53 errors. The Cardinals announced on its Twitter account an 11am press conference Sunday morning to discuss the firings and further staff changes. At the news conference, chairman Bill DeWitt Jr. said, "it was time for a fresh voice and some new leadership" in dismissing Matheny, Mabry, and Mueller. Mark Budaska, 65, was announced as the new batting coach. Budaska was their hitting coach at AAA-Memphis for years. George Greer, 71, a hitting coordinator in the minors is the new hitting coach.

The new manager, Mike Shildt, 49 (50 on Aug. 9), won his first major league game, 6–4, on July 15 at home. The 45,808 attendance made the Cardinals the second major league team (Los Angeles Dodgers, 2,382,991 in 51 home games) to pass the 2-million tickets sold. They have sold 2,030,250 tickets in 48 home games (24–24; 195 Runs, 206 Runs against), road record is 24–22, 218 Runs, 196 Runs against. Leading off in the game, Matt Carpenter hit his fifth leadoff home run in 2018, second consecutive game hitting a leadoff homer (19th in 2018), with the five in 2018 tying his own Cardinals record from 2015, set by Lou Brock (1967, 1970), and Ray Lankford (1994). It was also Carpenter's 20th leadoff home run of his career, one behind the Cardinals' record of 21, set by Brock.

Miles Mikolas, was placed on the paternity list (Wed.) July 18, up to three days, to attend the birth of twins, with wife Lauren previously saying she was not expecting until September. Reliever Matt Bowman will join the roster until Mikolas returns. Mikolas is scheduled to start the final game of the five-game series in Chicago.

Manager Shildt named Ron "Pop" Warner, 49, as his new bench coach on July 19, replacing himself.

Matt Carpenter tied the Cardinals' franchise record held by Lou Brock, with his 21st lead-off home run on, and 21st for the season on July 20, plus a new franchise record six lead-off HRs in a season. But, he wasn't finished setting records for the game. He hit two more HRs, his 22nd and 23rd, plus two doubles. He became the first Cardinals' player and only the second in MLB history (the Cubs' Kris Bryant) to have three HRs and two doubles in a game, going 5–for–5 and doing it all by the first six innings, in an 18–5 thrashing of the Cubs at Wrigley Field. He scored four runs with a career–high seven RBIs, and tied a franchise–record 16 total bases, surpassing Albert Pujols' 15, set on this same date 14 years ago (2004). The co–holder with 16 total bases is Mark Whiten with his MLB–record 4 HRs on September 7, 1993. Carpenter set an MLB record with the five extra–base hits in the first six innings of a game. His averages jumped from .262/.371/.532 and .904 OPS to .274/.381/.576 and .958 OPS. The team hit a season–high with the 18 runs, and the same for the 18 hits. The 18 hits included five doubles and five HRs. He started his first 140 plate appearances hitting a weak .140/.286/.272 and .558 OPS. Since then, Carpenter has pulled his season OPS up to .958 by hitting .346/.435/.738. The 18 runs scored has not been done by the Cardinals since August 22, 2008. Box Score: Cardinals 18, Cubs 5

Before the third game against the Cubs on July 21, the Cardinals placed Carlos Martinez on the 10-day DL from a right oblique strain (backdated to July 20), from the last inning of his July 19 start. Recalled John Brebbia, a long reliever. Optioned Matt Bowman. Miles Mikolas activated from the paternity list, and added Luke Weaver as the 26th man for the doubleheader that day.

Matt Carpenter becomes the first Cardinal player, and 28th in MLB history to hit a HR in six consecutive games in the same season, with one in each of the July 21 doubleheader games at Wrigley Field. He also became the only player to hit six HRs in a series at that stadium. He has hit eight HRs in 12 games against the Cubs in 2018, and the first Cardinal to have 12 consecutive hits go for extra bases. He has slugged .761 and 1.202 OPS over his past 58 games, and credits his secret salsa recipe for his resurgence. The record for consecutive HR games is eight, held by Dale Long, Don Mattingly, and Ken Griffey Jr.

The St. Louis market is #1 nationally among individual teams' local telecast ratings, and again had a strong performance in viewers for the 2018 All-Star Game and Home Run Derby. St. Louis ranked second for Fox's telecast of the game (KTVI, Channel 2), and tied for 10th for the Derby (on ESPN). It marked at least the 17th consecutive year that St. Louis has outperformed the national average—often by a significant amount. Ratings for the events are readily available dating to 2002. Nationally, the All-Star Game received a 5.2 rating, while in St. Louis it got double, a 10.3. The HR Derby got 3.2 nationally, but 4.9 in St. Louis.

Matt Carpenter became the second Cardinals' player in 2018 to be named the NL Player of the Week on July 23, for the shortened week July 19–22 (All-Star Game break), hitting .529/.620/1.706 (2.325 OPS), with his 9–for–17 performance in 5 games, including 2 Doubles, 6 HRs, 3 Walks, 8 Runs, and 10 RBIs.

Daniel Poncedeleon (RHP), 26, made his major league debut after his recall on July 23. His start comes less than 15 months since having emergency brain surgery after being hit with a comebacker on the forehead at AAA–Memphis. He became one of the best PCL starters, at 9–3, 2.15 ERA in 18 games (17 starts). Kolten Wong goes on the disabled list with a left knee inflammation. He pitched seven scoreless and hitless innings, before lifted after throwing 116 pitches (75 strikes), facing 24 batters with six groundouts and the same for flyouts. He walked three, with three strikeouts. He became the fifth pitcher to carry a no–hitter through seven innings in his MLB debut in the Expansion Era (1962), coming all the way back from his near–fatal head injury in May 2017. Leaving with a 1–0 lead, the Cardinals got through the eighth inning, but closer Bud Norris gave up a game–tying home run with two outs in the ninth, and lost the game 1–2 later that inning at Cincinnati's Great American Ball Park. Box Score

After 100 games played with the loss on July 23, the Cardinals fell to 50–50 (.500), with 24–24 at home and 26–26 on the road. Now in fourth place in the NL Central, 8 1/2 games behind the Cubs, and 1 1/2 games behind the Pittsburgh Pirates in third place.

The day after starter Daniel Poncedeleon made his dazzling MLB debut, he was optioned to AAA on July 24, so that lefty starter Austin Gomber can be recalled and make his first major league start. Gomber is 0–0, 3.77 ERA in 15 appearances (14.1 IP, 11 hits, 1 HR, 8 walks, 2 hit batters, 10 strikeouts, a .233 Opp–BA, 1.33 WHIP in 59 batters faced) as a reliever this year, and was 7–3, 3.42 ERA in 12 games (11 starts) at AAA–Memphis. The Cardinals' relief corps has allowed 21 runs in six games since the All-Star break, a 2–4 stretch pushing them down to .500 and fourth place in the NL Central.

== Schedule and results ==
Regular Season Schedule (calendar style)
Regular Season Schedule (sortable text)
National Broadcast Schedule (all teams), EDT

Most games are broadcast on Fox Sports Midwest, unless noted on the game dates.
The April 11 home game against the Brewers has the distinction of one of 25 weekday afternoon games with a video broadcast only on Facebook Watch. The Cardinals won't be allowed to broadcast the game on Fox Sports Midwest. Facebook said on March 9, that recorded broadcasts also will be available globally, excluding select international markets. The away game against the Brewers on May 30, is also an exclusive Facebook broadcast.

=== Game log ===
Legend: = Win = Loss = Postponement
Bold = Cardinals player

2018 St. Louis Cardinals Game Log, 88–74 (.543)
March: 0–2 (.000) (Home: 0–0; Away: 0–2)

#	Date	Opponent	Score	Win	Loss	Save	Attendance	Record	Box / L10
1	March 29	@Mets	4–9	Syndergaard (1–0)	**Martinez** (0–1)		44,189	0–1	0–1
2	March 31	@Mets	2–6	deGrom (1–0)	**Wacha** (0–1)	Familia (1)	36,098	0–2	0–2

April: 15–10 (.600) (Home: 7–5; Away: 8–5)

#	Date	Opponent	Score	Win	Loss	Save	Attendance	Record	Box / L10
3	April 1	@Mets	5–1	**Weaver** (1–0)	Matz (0–1)		22,486	1–2	1–2
4	April 2	@Brewers	8–4	**Mikolas** (1–0)	Davies (0–1)		45,393	2–2	2–2
5	April 3	@Brewers	4–5	Jennings (1–0)	**Leone** (0–1)		27,760	2–3	2–3
6	April 4	@Brewers (FS1)	6–0	**Martinez** (1–1)	Chacin (0–1)		27,674	3–3	3–3
7	April 5	Diamondbacks	1–3	Ray (2–0)	**Wainwright** (0–1)	Boxberger (3)	46,512	3–4	3–4
8	April 7	Diamondbacks	5–3	**Wacha** (1–1)	Greinke (0–1)	**Norris** (1)	41,113	4–4	4–4
9	April 8	Diamondbacks	1–4	Hirano (1–0)	**Leone** (0–2)	Boxberger (4)	40,468	4–5	4–5
10	April 9	Brewers (ESPN)	4–5 (10)	Albers (2–0)	**Holland** (0–1)		35,189	4–6	4–6
11	April 10	Brewers	5–3 (11)	**Leone** (1–2)	Hoover (0–1)		35,220	5–6	5–5
12	April 11	Brewers (Facebook)	2–3	Guerra (1–0)	**Wainwright** (0–2)	Albers (1)	35,814	5–7	5–5
13	April 12	@Reds	13–4	**Wacha** (2–1)	Brice (0–2)	**Mayers** (1)	11,128	6–7	5–5
14	April 13	@Reds	5–3	**Weaver** (2–0)	Mahle (1–2)	**Norris** (2)	19,561	7–7	5–5
15	April 14	@Reds	6–1	**Mikolas** (2–0)	Finnegan (0–1)		19,213	8–7	6–4
16	April 15	@Reds	3–2	**Martinez** (2–1)	Bailey (0–3)	**Norris** (3)	15,557	9–7	6–4
–	April 16	@Cubs (ESPN)	**Postponed (inclement weather)** (Makeup date: July 21, 1st G)						
17	April 17	@Cubs	5–3	**Wainwright** (1–2)	Chatwood (0–3)	**Norris** (4)	35,103	10–7	7–3
–	April 18	@Cubs	**Postponed (inclement weather)** (Makeup date: April 19)						
18	April 19	@Cubs	5–8	Lester (2–0)	**Weaver** (2–1)	Morrow (3)	29,648	10–8	6–4
19	April 20	Reds	4–2	**Wacha** (3–1)	Finnegan (0–2)	**Norris** (5)	43,303	11–8	7–3
20	April 21	Reds	4–3	**Hicks** (1–0)	Hughes (0–2)		42,382	12–8	8–2
21	April 22	Reds	9–2	**Mikolas** (3–0)	Castillo (1–3)		44,430	13–8	8–2
22	April 24	Mets	5–6 (10)	Gsellman (3–0)	**Bowman** (0–1)	Familia (9)	36,237	13–9	8–2
23	April 25	Mets	9–1	**Wacha** (4–1)	Matz (1–2)	**Brebbia** (1)	38,045	14–9	8–2
24	April 26	Mets	4–3 (13)	**Gant** (1–0)	Sewald (0–1)		37,762	15–9	8–2
25	April 27	@Pirates	5–6 (11)	Kontos (2–2)	**Hicks** (1–1)		15,748	15–10	7–3
26	April 28	@Pirates	2–6	Williams (4–1)	**Flaherty** (0–1)		18,568	15–11	6–4
27	April 29	@Pirates	0–5	Kingham (1–0)	**Weaver** (2–2)		14,378	15–12	5–5

May: 15–12 (.556) (Home: 9–6; Away: 6–6)

#	Date	Opponent	Score	Win	Loss	Save	Attendance	Record	Box / L10
28	May 1	White Sox	3–2	**Norris** (1–0)	Soria (0–1)		38,800	16–12	6–4
29	May 2	White Sox	3–2	**Martinez** (3–1)	Giolito (1–4)	**Norris** (6)	37,298	17–12	6–4
30	May 4	Cubs	3–2	**Mikolas** (4–0)	Quintana (3–2)	**Norris** (7)	46,099	18–12	6–4
31	May 5	Cubs	8–6 (10)	**Lyons** (1–0)	Farrell (1–1)		47,154	19–12	6–4
32	May 6	Cubs (ESPN)	4–3 (14)	**Mayers** (1–0)	Farrell (1–2)		45,438	20–12	7–3
33	May 7	Twins	0–6	Romero (2–0)	**Gant** (1–1)		40,182	20–13	6–4
34	May 8	Twins	1–7	Odorizzi (3–2)	**Martinez** (3–2)		39,253	20–14	5–5
35	May 10	@Padres	2–1	**Mikolas** (5–0)	Lyles (0–1)	**Norris** (8)	20,515	21–14	6–4
36	May 11	@Padres	9–5	**Weaver** (3–2)	Lauer (1–2)		28,207	22–14	7–3
37	May 12	@Padres	1–2 (13)	Cimber (2–1)	**Brebbia** (0–1)		32,715	22–15	7–3
38	May 13	@Padres	3–5	Richard (2–5)	**Wainwright** (1–3)	Hand (11)	28,183	22–16	6–4
39	May 15	@Twins (FS1)	1–4	Berríos (4–4)	**Cecil** (0–1)	Rodney (8)	24,259	22–17	5–5
40	May 16	@Twins	7–5	**Hicks** (2–1)	Lynn (1–4)	**Norris** (9)	25,180	23–17	5–5
41	May 17	Phillies	2–6	Velasquez (4–4)	**Weaver** (3–3)		41,039	23–18	4–6
42	May 18	Phillies	12–4	**Wacha** (5–1)	Arrieta (3–2)		42,050	24–18	4–6
43	May 19	Phillies	6–7	Hunter (1–0)	**Holland** (0–2)	Dominguez (1)	44,431	24–19	4–6
44	May 20	Phillies	5–1	**Flaherty** (1–1)	Nola (6–2)		43,560	25–19	5–5
45	May 21	Royals	6–0	**Mikolas** (6–0)	Kennedy (1–5)		42,140	26–19	5–5
46	May 22	Royals	1–5	Hammel (1–5)	**Weaver** (3–4)		39,545	26–20	4–6
47	May 23	Royals	2–5 (10)	Boyer (2–0)	**Norris** (1–1)	Herrera (10)	41,984	26–21	4–6
48	May 25	@Pirates	1–8	Musgrove (1–0)	**Gant** (1–2)		22,629	26–22	4–6
49	May 26	@Pirates	4–1	**Flaherty** (2–1)	Williams (5–3)	**Norris** (10)	22,133	27–22	5–5
50	May 27	@Pirates	6–4	**Tuivailala** (1–0)	Feliz (0–2)	**Norris** (11)	19,608	28–22	5–5
51	May 28	@Brewers	3–8	Suter (5–3)	**Weaver** (3–5)		42,867	28–23	5–5
52	May 29	@Brewers	6–1	**Wacha** (6–1)	Davies (2–5)		40,982	29–23	5–5
53	May 30	@Brewers (Facebook)	2–3	Jeffress (5–0)	**Tuivailala** (1–1)	Knebel (5)	33,133	29–24	5–5
54	May 31	Pirates	10–8	**Mayers** (2–0)	Vázquez (2–2)		40,832	30–24	5–5

June: 12–15 (.444) (Home: 8–10; Away: 4–5)

#	Date	Opponent	Score	Win	Loss	Save	Attendance	Record	Box / L10
55	June 1	Pirates	0–4	Taillon (3–4)	**Mikolas** (6–1)		47,135	30–25	4–6
56	June 2	Pirates	3–2	**Norris** (2–1)	Rodriguez (1–2)		44,492	31–25	5–5
57	June 3	Pirates	5–0	**Wacha** (7–1)	Kingham (2–2)		44,432	32–25	6–4
58	June 5	Marlins (FS1)	4–7	Ureña (1–7)	**Guilmet** (0–1)	Barraclough (2)	40,070	32–26	6–4
59	June 6	Marlins	3–11	Rucinski (1–0)	**Flaherty** (2–2)		40,109	32–27	5–5
60	June 7	Marlins	4–1	**Mikolas** (7–1)	Richards (0–3)	**Norris** (12)	41,297	33–27	5–5
61	June 8	@Reds	7–6 (10)	**Norris** (3–1)	Iglesias (1–1)	**Brebbia** (2)	26,144	34–27	6–4
62	June 9	@Reds	6–4	**Wacha** (8–1)	Castillo (4–7)	**Hicks** (1)	34,469	35–27	6–4
63	June 10	@Reds	3–6	DeSclafani (1–1)	**Martinez** (3–3)	Hughes (4)	19,344	35–28	6–4
64	June 11	Padres	5–2	**Flaherty** (3–2)	Lyles (2–3)	**Norris** (13)	40,971	36–28	6–4
65	June 12	Padres	2–4	Cimber (3–2)	**Mikolas** (7–2)	Hand (20)	40,199	36–29	6–4
66	June 13	Padres	2–4	Lauer (3–4)	**Weaver** (3–6)	Hand (21)	44,094	36–30	5–5
67	June 15	Cubs	5–13	Lester (8–2)	**Wacha** (8–2)		46,188	36–31	4–6
68	June 16	Cubs (Fox)	3–6	Hendricks (5–6)	**Tuivailala** (1–2)	Morrow (16)	47,168	36–32	4–6
69	June 17	Cubs (ESPN)	5–0	**Brebbia** (1–1)	Quintana (6–5)		46,214	37–32	5–5
70	June 18	@Phillies	5–6 (10)	Thompson (1–0)	**Bowman** (0–2)		22,083	37–33	4–6
71	June 19	@Phillies	7–6	**Hicks** (3–1)	Dominguez (1–1)		21,122	38–33	4–6
72	June 20	@Phillies	3–4	Ramos (2–0)	**Tuivailala** (1–3)	Morgan (1)	26,120	38–34	3–7
73	June 21	@Brewers	3–11	Suter (8–4)	**Martinez** (3–4)		32,764	38–35	3–7
74	June 22	@Brewers	1–2	Knebel (1–0)	**Norris** (3–2)		36,275	38–36	2–8
75	June 23	@Brewers	3–2	**Mikolas** (8–2)	Jeffress (5–1)	**Norris** (14)	35,551	39–36	3–7
76	June 24	@Brewers	8–2	**Weaver** (4–6)	Chacin (6–3)		39,710	40–36	4–6
77	June 25	Indians	4–0	**Gant** (2–2)	Clevinger (6–3)	**Norris** (15)	42,007	41–36	5–5
78	June 26	Indians	11–2	**Martinez** (4–4)	Kluber (11–4)		40,288	42–36	6–4
79	June 27	Indians	1–5	Bieber (3–0)	**Flaherty** (3–3)		43,598	42–37	5–5
80	June 29	Braves	1–5	Teherán (6–5)	**Mikolas** (8–3)	Winkler (1)	46,226	42–38	5–5
81	June 30	Braves (Fox)	4–11	Fried (1–2)	**Weaver** (4–7)		46,667	42–39	4–6

July: 12–14 (.462) (Home: 4–5; Away: 8–9)

#	Date	Opponent	Score	Win	Loss	Save	Attendance	Record	Box / L10
82	July 1	Braves	5–6	Foltynewicz (6–4)	**Gant** (2–3)	Minter (3)	46,448	42–40	4–6
83	July 2	@Diamondbacks	6–3	**Martinez** (5–4)	Ray (3–1)	**Norris** (16)	20,334	43–40	5–5
84	July 3	@Diamondbacks	2–4	Greinke (9–5)	**Flaherty** (3–4)	Boxberger (20)	25,843	43–41	5–5
85	July 4	@Diamondbacks	8–4	**Mikolas** (9–3)	Hirano (2–1)		44,072	44–41	5–5
86	July 5	@Giants	11–2	**Weaver** (5–7)	Cueto (3–1)		38,766	45–41	5–5
87	July 6	@Giants	2–3	Moronta (5–1)	**Brebbia** (1–2)	Smith (3)	37,996	45–42	4–6
88	July 7	@Giants	3–2	**Martinez** (6–4)	Samardzija (1–5)	**Norris** (17)	39,606	46–42	4–6
89	July 8	@Giants	8–13	Bumgarner (2–3)	**Brebbia** (1–3)		38,855	46–43	4–6
90	July 10	@White Sox	14–2	**Mikolas** (10–3)	Covey (3–5)		23,245	47–43	5–5
91	July 11	@White Sox	0–4	Rodón (2–3)	**Weaver** (5–8)	Soria (13)	26,319	47–44	5–5
92	July 13	Reds	1–9	Harvey (5–5)	**Martinez** (6–5)		45,891	47–45	5–5
93	July 14	Reds	2–8	Brice (2–2)	**Hicks** (3–2)		44,668	47–46	4–6
94	July 15	Reds	6–4	**Gant** (3–3)	DeSclafani (4–2)	**Hicks** (2)	45,808	48–46	5–5
ASG	**89th All-Star Game** at Nationals Park in Washington, District of Columbia, United States								Box
ASG	July 17	NL All-Stars 6, **AL All-Stars** 8 (10)		Díaz (SEA)	Stripling (LAD)	Happ (TOR)	43,843	AL; 44–43–2	Box
ASG	Representing the Cardinals: Miles Mikolas and Yadier Molina								Box
95	July 19	@Cubs (ESPN)	6–9	Duensing (3–0)	**Martinez** (6–6)	Strop (3)	41,406	48–47	4–6
96	July 20	@Cubs	18–5	**Flaherty** (4–4)	Lester (12–3)		41,077	49–47	4–6
97	July 21	@Cubs	2–7	Chatwood (4–5)	**Weaver** (5–9)		41,004	49–48	4–6
98	July 21	@Cubs (Fox)	6–3	**Tuivailala** (2–3)	Wilson (3–3)	**Norris** (18)	41,244	50–48	4–6
99	July 22	@Cubs (FSM / TBS)	2–7	Quintana (9–6)	**Mayers** (2–1)		39,737	50–49	4–6
100	July 23	@Reds	1–2	Hughes (3–3)	**Norris** (3–3)		17,518	50–50	3–7
101	July 24	@Reds	4–2 (11)	**Tuivailala** (3–3)	Garrett (0–2)	**Norris** (19)	18,379	51–50	4–6
102	July 25	@Reds	3–7	Romano (6–8)	**Flaherty** (4–5)		20,940	51–51	4–6
103	July 27	Cubs	5–2	**Weaver** (6–9)	Montgomery (3–4)		47,169	52–51	5–5
104	July 28	Cubs (FS1)	6–2	**Mikolas** (11–3)	Quintana (9–7)		47,514	53–51	5–5
105	July 29	Cubs (ESPN)	2–5	Hendricks (7–9)	**Gant** (3–4)	Strop (5)	45,553	53–52	5–5
106	July 30	Rockies	5–4 (10)	**Hudson** (1–0)	McGee (1–4)		41,856	54–52	5–5
107	July 31	Rockies	3–6	Gray (9–7)	**Jack Flaherty** (4–6)	Davis (31)	42636	54–53	5–5

August: 22–6 (.786) (Home: 10–3; Away: 12–3)

#	Date	Opponent	Score	Win	Loss	Save	Attendance	Record	Box / L10
108	August 1	Rockies	6–3	**Gomber** (1–0)	Freeland (9–7)		40,544	55–53	5–5
109	August 2	Rockies	3–2	**Shreve** (3–2)	Davis (1–4)		41,478	56–53	6–4
110	August 3	@Pirates	6–7	Crick (2–1)	**Hicks** (3–3)	Vázquez (25)	26,773	56–54	6–4
111	August 4	@Pirates	8–4	**Hudson** (2–0)	McRae (0–1)		32,473	57–54	6–4
112	August 5	@Pirates	2–1	**Flaherty** (5–6)	Williams (9–8)	**Norris** (21)	19,376	58–54	7–3
113	August 6	@Marlins	2–3	Chen (4–8)	**Weaver** (6–10)	Guerra (1)	8,563	58–55	6–4
114	August 7	@Marlins	3–2	**Mikolas** (12–3)	Hernández (2–6)	**Norris** (22)	7,230	59–55	6–4
115	August 8	@Marlins	7–1	**Gant** (4–4)	Richards (3–7)		7,306	60–55	7–3
116	August 10	@Royals	7–0	**Gomber** (2–0)	Smith (1–4)	**Poncedeleon** (1)	29,414	61–55	7–3
117	August 11	@Royals	8–3	**Flaherty** (6–6)	Duffy (7–11)	**Hicks** (3)	38,427	62–55	8–2
118	August 12	@Royals	8–2	**Ross** (7–9)	Hammel (2–12)		23.409	63–55	8–2
119	August 13	Nationals	7–6	**Hudson** (3–0)	Glover (0–1)		37,197	64–55	8–2
120	August 14	Nationals	6–4	**Gant** (5–4)	González (7–9)	**Hicks** (4)	38,214	65–55	9–1
121	August 15	Nationals	4–2	**Gomber** (3–0)	Hellickson (5–3)	**Norris** (23)	36,696	66–55	9–1
122	August 16	Nationals	4–5	Roark (8–12)	**Weaver** (6–11)	Glover (1)	38,074	66–56	8–2
123	August 17	Brewers	5–2	**Flaherty** (7–6)	Peralta (5–4)	**Norris** (24)	41,630	67–56	9–1
124	August 18	Brewers (FS1)	7–2	**Mikolas** (13–3)	Miley (2–2)		46,040	68–56	9–1
125	August 19	Brewers	1–2	Chacín (13–4)	**Gant** (5–5)	Hader (10)	45,334	68–57	8–2
126	August 20	@Dodgers	5–3	**Cecil** (1–1)	Jansen (0–4)	**Norris** (25)	42,402	69–57	8–2
127	August 21	@Dodgers	5–2	**Weaver** (7–11)	Ryu (3–1)	**Norris** (26)	43,923	70–57	8–2
128	August 22	@Dodgers	3–1	**Hudson** (4–0)	Jansen (0–5)	**Hicks** (5)	48,247	71–57	8–2
129	August 24	@Rockies	7–5	**Martinez** (7–6)	Senzatela (4–4)	**Norris** (27)	43,578	72–57	8–2
130	August 25	@Rockies	1–9	Ottavino (6–2)	**Hudson** (4–1)		47,785	72–58	7–3
131	August 26	@Rockies	12–3	**Gomber** (4–0)	Anderson (6–7)		41,235	73–58	7–3
132	August 28	Pirates	5–2	**Flaherty** (8–6)	Nova (7–9)	**Norris** (28)	35,258	74–58	8–2
133	August 29	Pirates	0–2	Williams (11-9)	**Mikolas** (13-4)	Vázquez (28)	33,448	74–59	7–3
134	August 30	Pirates	5–0	**Gant** (6–5)	Musgrove (5–8)		38,561	75–59	7–3
135	August 31	Reds	12–5	**Gomber** (5–0)	Bailey (1–13)		42,365	76–59	8–2

September: 12–15 (.444) (Home: 6–9; Away: 6–6)

#	Date	Opponent	Score	Win	Loss	Save	Attendance	Record	Box / L10
136	September 1	Reds	0–4	Castillo (8–11)	**Poncedeleon** (0–1)		46,368	76–60	7–3
137	September 2	Reds	4–6 (10)	Lorenzen (2–1)	**Norris** (3–4)	Iglesias (25)	45,743	76–61	6–4
138	September 3	@Nationals (ESPN)	3–4 (10)	Holland (2–2)	**Shreve** (3–3)		28,648	76–62	5–5
139	September 4	@Nationals	11–8	**Ross** (8–9)	Williams (0–1)	**Hicks** (6)	21,637	77–62	5–5
140	September 5	@Nationals	7–6	**Mikolas** (14–4)	Roark (8–15)	**Martínez** (1)	22,124	78–62	6–4
141	September 7	@Tigers	3–5	Greene (3–6)	**Hicks** (3–4)		21,268	78–63	5–5
142	September 8	@Tigers	3–4	Greene (4–6)	**Norris** (3–5)		30,268	78–64	4–6
143	September 9	@Tigers	5–2	**Gant** (7–5)	Fulmer (3–11)	**Martínez** (2)	22,212	79–64	5–5
144	September 10	Pirates	8–7	**Brebbia** (2–3)	Santana (2–3)	**Martínez** (3)	33,566	80–64	5–5
145	September 11	Pirates	11–5	**Mikolas** (15–4)	Musgrove (6–9)		37,187	81–64	5–5
146	September 12	Pirates	3–4	Taillon (13–9)	**Poncedeleon** (0–2)	Vázquez (32)	39,606	81–65	5–5
147	September 13	Dodgers	7–9	Kershaw (8–5)	**Gomber** (5–1)		40,997	81–66	5–5
148	September 14	Dodgers	0–3	Buehler (7–5)	**Flaherty** (8–7)	Jansen (35)	46,036	81–67	5–5
149	September 15	Dodgers (Fox)	4–17	Hill (9–5)	**Gant** (7–6)		45,481	81–68	4–6
150	September 16	Dodgers (ESPN)	5–0	**Wainwright** (2–3)	Stripling (8–4)		45,217	82–68	4–6
151	September 17	@Braves	11–6	**Mikolas** (16–4)	Foltynewicz (11–10)		24,304	83–68	5–5
152	September 18	@Braves	8–1	**Gomber** (6–1)	Sánchez (6–6)		23,083	84–68	6–4
153	September 19	@Braves	3–7	Toussaint (2–1)	**Flaherty** (8–8)		25,195	84–69	5–5
154	September 21	Giants	5–3	**Brebbia** (3–3)	Melancon (0–2)	**Martínez** (4)	45,892	85–69	5–5
155	September 22	Giants (Fox)	5–4 (10)	**Martínez** (8–6)	Melancon (0–3)		44,724	86–69	5–5
156	September 23	Giants	9–2	**Mikolas** (17–4)	Suarez (7–12)	—	46,596	87–69	6–4
157	September 24	Brewers	4–6	Burnes (7–0)	**Norris** (3–6)	Knebel (16)	36,508	87–70	6–4
158	September 25	Brewers	4–12	Williams (1&–3)	**Gomber** (6–2)	—	38,051	87–71	6–4
159	September 26	Brewers	1–2	Chacín (15–8)	**Shreve** (3–4)	Jeffress (13)	40,644	87–72	6–4
160	September 28	@Cubs	4–8	Hendricks (14–11)	**Wainwright** (2–4)	—	39,442	87–73	5–5
161	September 29	@Cubs	2–1	**Mikolas** (18–4)	Hamels (9–12)	**Martinez** (5)	40,784	88–73	5–5
162	September 30	@Cubs	5–10	Webster (1–0)	**Flaherty** (8–9)	—	39,275	88–74	4–6

Legend: = Win = Loss = Postponement
Bold = Cardinals player

== Opening Day lineup ==
25	Dexter Fowler	RF
28	Tommy Pham	CF
13	Matt Carpenter	3B
23	Marcell Ozuna	LF
38	José Martínez	1B
4	Yadier Molina	C
12	Paul DeJong	SS
16	Kolten Wong	2B
18	Carlos Martínez	P

== Roster ==
2018 St. Louis Cardinals
Roster
Pitchers: 67 Matt Bowman; 60 John Brebbia; 27 Brett Cecil; 32 Jack Flaherty; 65 Giovanny Gallegos; 53 John Gant; 68 Austin Gomber; 44 Luke Gregerson; 58 Preston Guilmet; 49 Jordan Hicks; 56 Greg Holland; 43 Dakota Hudson; 55 Dominic Leone; 70 Tyler Lyons; 18 Carlos Martínez; 59 Mike Mayers; 39 Miles Mikolas; 26 Bud Norris; 62 Daniel Poncedeleon; 29 Alex Reyes; 33 Tyson Ross; 65 Ryan Sherriff; 40 Chasen Shreve; 64 Sam Tuivailala; 52 Michael Wacha; 50 Adam Wainwright; 7 Luke Weaver; 30 Tyler Webb	Catchers: 61 Steve Baron; 19 Carson Kelly; 4 Yadier Molina; 46 Francisco Peña; Infielders: 15 Matt Adams; 13 Matt Carpenter; 12 Paul DeJong; 35 Greg Garcia; 3 Jedd Gyorko; 38 José Martinez; 34 Yairo Muñoz; 63 Edmundo Sosa; 40 Luke Voit; 21 Patrick Wisdom; 16 Kolten Wong	Outfielders: 48 Harrison Bader; 25 Dexter Fowler; 28 Adolis García; 41 Tyler O'Neill; 23 Marcell Ozuna; 28 Tommy Pham	Manager: 22 Mike Matheny; 8,83 Mike Shildt; Coaches: 58 Mark Budaska (batting); 72 Bryan Eversgerd (bullpen); 36 George Greer (hitting); 47 John Mabry (hitting); 31 Mike Maddux (pitching); 37 Oliver Marmol (first base); 51 Willie McGee (coach); 43 Bill Mueller (assistant hitting); 11 José Oquendo (third base); 94 Jamie Pogue (bullpen catcher); 83 Mike Shildt (bench); 76 Kleininger Teran (bullpen catcher); 75 Ron 'Pop' Warner (bench)

=== Injury DL report ===
(10-days, unless noted)
Injury Report

Name	Duration of Injury on DL		Injury type	Disabled list	Games missed	Ref.
Name	Start	End	Injury type	Disabled list	Games missed	Ref.
Luke Gregerson (RHP)	March 29	April 16	Left hamstring strain	March 28 (retro., March 26)	16	
Adam Wainwright (RHP)	March 29	April 5	Left hamstring strain	March 28 (retro., March 26)	6 (1 start)	
Alex Reyes (RHP)	March 29	May 30	Tommy John surgery, partial elbow UCL tear (2/14/17)	March 28 (retroactive, March 26); Trans. to 60-day DL, March 31	52 (10 starts)	
Brett Cecil (LHP)	March 31	May 11	Left dead-arm feel, shoulder pain	March 31	34	
Jedd Gyorko (INF)	April 3	April 16	Right hamstring strain	April 3	12	
Ryan Sherriff (LHP)	April 8	May 4	Right big toe hairline fracture	April 8 (retroactive, April 6)	21	
Sam Tuivailala (RHP)	April 12	May 4	Left knee sprain	April 12 (retroactive, April 10)	17	
Adam Wainwright (RHP)	April 22	May 13	Right elbow inflammation	April 22 (retroactive, April 20)	17 (4 starts)	
Dominic Leone (RHP)	May 6	TBD	Right biceps injury	May 6 Trans. to 60-day DL, May 30		
Yadier Molina (C)	May 6	June 5	Groin, hematoma	May 6	26	
Carlos Martinez (RHP)	May 10	June 5	Right lat strain	May 10	23 (5 starts)	
Tyler Lyons (LHP)	May 11	May 26	Mid back strain	May 11 (retroactive, May 9)	13	
Adam Wainwright (RHP)	May 15	TBD	Right elbow inflammation	May 15 (retroactive, May 14); Trans. to 60-day DL, May 17		
Luke Gregerson (RHP)	May 16	July 13	Right shoulder impingement	May 16	52	
Carson Kelly (C)	May 17	May 26	Right hamstring strain	May 17 (retroactive, May 16)	8	
Matt Bowman (RHP)	May 18	June 15	Right index, middle fingers blistering	May 18 (retroactive, May 17)	25	
Paul DeJong (SS)	May 18	July 6	Left fractured hand	May 18	45	
Greg Holland (RHP)	May 26	June 19	Right hip impingement	May 26	22	
Alex Reyes (RHP)	May 31	TBD	Right lat strain	May 31; Trans. to 60-day DL, June 29	109	
Ryan Sherriff (LHP)	June 5 *	TBD	Tommy John Surgery	June 5	105	
Tyler Lyons (LHP)	June 8	July 13	Left elbow sprain	June 8 (retroactive, June 6)	31	
Matt Bowman (RHP)	June 19	July 5	Right index, middle fingers blistering (Raynaud syndrome)	June 19	15	
Michael Wacha (RHP)	June 21	TBD	Left oblique strain	June 21		
Tyler O'Neill (OF)	July 5	TBD	Left groin sprain	July 5		
Carlos Martinez (RHP)	July 21	TBD	Right oblique strain	July 21 (retroactive, July 20)		
Kolten Wong (2B)	July 23	TBD	Left knee inflammation	July 23 (retroactive, July 22)		

- surgery date, not official date on the disabled list at St. Louis; AAA-Memphis disabled list on May 18

== Statistics ==
=== Batting statistics ===
(through September 30)

Legend
Pos	Position	R	Runs scored	HR	Home runs	SB	Stolen bases	AVG	Batting average
G	Games played	H	Hits	RBI	Runs batted in	CS	Caught stealing	OBP	On-base percentage
PA	Plate appearances	2B	Doubles	BB	Bases on balls	HBP	HBP	SLG	Slugging percentage
AB	At bats	3B	Triples	SO	Strikeouts	GIDP	GIDP	OPS	On-base plus slugging percentage

	Key to symbols and categories
**Names**	* – left-handed batter or pitcher; # – switch hitter; Bold: active and on both 25-man roster and 40-man roster; ''₤ – on 40-man roster but not 25-man roster; Italics: on 10-day disabled list (DL) or 60-day DL (§)
**Starting lineup** / **rotation**	Table half above first double line: Appeared in most games at that position or top five pitchers in starts Below double line: Ranked by AB regardless of position for position players / Role, then IP for pitchers
**Statistics**	: Team leader; Bold: Major League Baseball (MLB) leader or tied for lead; **Bold** (non-italicized): American (AL) or National League (NL) leader or tied for lead; ^{†} – top-ten in AL or NL

Regular season
Pos	Batter	G	AB	R	H	2B	3B	HR	RBI	BB	SO	SB	CS	HBP	GIDP	AVG	OBP	SLG	OPS
C	Y. Molina	123	459	55	120	20	0	20	74	29	66	4	3	9	15	0.261	0.314	0.436	0.750
1B	J. Martínez	152	534	64	163	30	0	17	83	49	104	0	3	2	15	0.305	0.364	0.475	0.821
2B	Kolten Wong	127	353	41	88	18	2	9	38	31	60	6	5	14	6	0.249	0.332	0.388	0.720
SS	P. DeJong	115	436	68	105	25	1	19	68	36	123	1	1	12	6	0.241	0.313	0.433	0.746
3B	Jedd Gyorko	125	351	49	92	19	1	11	47	44	77	2	0	3	12	0.262	0.346	0.416	0.762
LF	M. Ozuna	148	582	69	163	16	2	23	88	38	110	3	0	3	10	0.280	0.325	0.483	0.758
CF	T. Pham	98	351	67	87	11	0	14	41	42	97	10	6	2	12	0.248	0.331	0.399	0.730
RF	Dexter Fowler	90	289	40	52	10	0	8	31	38	75	5	2	3	2	0.180	0.278	0.298	0.576
CI	Matt Carpenter	156	564	111	145	42	0	36	81	102	158	4	1	6	0	0.257	0.374	0.523	0.897
OF	Harrison Bader	138	379	61	100	20	2	12	37	31	125	15	3	11	1	0.264	0.334	0.422	0.756
MI	Yairo Munoz	108	293	39	81	16	0	8	42	30	71	5	6	4	3	0.276	0.350	0.413	0.763
MI	Greg Garcia	114	181	15	40	6	0	3	15	20	37	3	1	4	3	0.221	0.309	0.304	0.613
OF	Tyler O'Neill	61	130	29	33	5	0	9	23	7	57	2	0	3	0	0.254	0.303	0.500	0.803
C	Francisco Peña	58	133	10	27	3	0	2	8	6	43	1	0	1	5	0.203	0.239	0.271	0.510
1B	Matt Adams	27	57	5	9	1	0	3	9	3	18	0	0	0	0	0.158	0.200	0.333	0.533
CI	Patrick Wisdom	32	50	11	13	1	0	4	10	6	19	2	1	2	1	0.260	0.362	0.520	0.882
C	Carson Kelly	19	35	1	4	0	0	0	3	3	7	0	0	1	0	0.114	0.205	0.114	0.319
OF	Adolis García	21	17	3	2	1	0	0	1	0	7	0	0	0	0	0.118	0.118	0.176	0.294
1B	Luke Volt	8	11	2	2	0	0	1	3	2	4	0	0	0	0	0.182	0.308	0.455	0.762
C	Steven Baron	2	5	0	1	0	0	0	0	0	2	0	0	0	0	0.200	0.200	0.200	0.400
2B	Edmundo Sosa	3	2	1	0	0	0	0	0	1	1	0	0	0	0	0.000	0.333	0.000	0.333
Non-pitcher totals			5,212	741	1,327	244	8	199	702	518	1,261	63	32	80	91	0.255	0.329	0.419	0.748
Pitcher totals			286	18	42	4	1	6	23	7	119	0	0	0	1	0.147	0.166	0.231	0.397
TEAM TOTALS		162	5,498	759	1,369	248	9	205	725	525	1,380	63	32	80	92	0.249	0.321	0.409	0.730
Rank of 15 teams in NL			9	5	9	13	15	4	4	9	5	14	5	1	—	9	8	7	7

Sources:

- 2018 St. Louis Cardinals batting stats at Baseball Reference
- 2018 St. Louis Cardinals batting stats at ESPN.com

=== Pitching statistics ===
(through September 30)

Legend
Role	Pitcher	G	Games pitched	ShO	Shutouts	HR	Home runs allowed	H/9	Hits per nine innings pitched
W	Wins	GS	Games started	SV	Save	BB	Bases on balls allowed	BB/9	Bases on balls per 9 innings pitched
L	Losses	GF	Games finished	IP	Innings pitched	SO	Strikeouts	SO/9	Strikeouts per 9 innings pitched
ERA	Earned run average	CG	Complete game	H	Hits allowed	WHIP	Walks plus hits per inning pitched	BFP	Batters faced by pitcher

	Key to symbols and categories
**Names**	* – left-handed batter or pitcher; # – switch hitter; Bold: active and on both 25-man roster and 40-man roster; ''₤ – on 40-man roster but not 25-man roster; Italics: on 10-day disabled list (DL) or 60-day DL (§)
**Starting lineup** / **rotation**	Table half above first double line: Appeared in most games at that position or top five pitchers in starts Below double line: Ranked by AB regardless of position for position players / Role, then IP for pitchers
**Statistics**	: Team leader; Bold: Major League Baseball (MLB) leader or tied for lead; **Bold** (non-italicized): American (AL) or National League (NL) leader or tied for lead; ^{†} – top-ten in AL or NL

Regular Season
Pitcher	W	L	W%	ERA	G	GS	GF	ShO	SV	IP	H	HR	BB	SO	WHIP	Opp.BA	H/9	BB/9	SO/9	HB	BFP
Miles Mikolas	18	4	.818	2.83	32	32	1	1	0	200.2	186	16	29	146	1.07	.245	8.3	1.3	6.5	7	808
Jack Flaherty	8	9	.471	3.34	28	28	0	0	0	151.0	108	20	59	182	1.11	.199	6.4	3.5	10.8	11	615
Luke Weaver	7	11	.389	4.95	30	25	3	0	0	136.1	150	19	54	121	1.50	.277	9.9	3.6	8.0	3	609
Carlos Martínez	8	6	.571	3.11	33	18	9	0	5	118.2	100	5	60	117	1.35	.228	7.6	4.6	8.9	11	521
John Gant	7	6	.538	3.47	26	19	1	0	0	114.0	91	9	57	95	1.30	.216	7.2	4.5	7.5	2	487
Michael Wacha	8	2	.800	3.20	15	15	0	0	0	84.1	68	9	36	71	1.23	.221	7.3	3.8	7.6	2	355
Bud Norris	3	6	.333	3.59	64	0	42	0	28	57.2	51	8	21	67	1.25	.237	8.0	3.3	10.5	5	245
Jordan Hicks	3	4	.429	3.59	73	0	20	0	6	77.2	59	2	45	70	1.34	.208	6.8	5.2	8.1	8	339
Mike Mayers	2	1	.667	4.70	50	0	15	0	1	51.2	59	7	15	49	1.43	.289	10.3	2.6	8.5	1	226
John Brebbia	3	3	.500	3.20	45	0	17	0	2	50.2	43	5	16	60	1.16	.226	7.6	2.8	10.7	0	209
Brett Cecil	1	1	.500	6.89	40	0	7	0	0	32.2	39	5	25	19	1.96	.302	10.7	6.9	5.2	0	157
Austin Gomber	6	2	.750	4.44	29	11	1	0	0	75.0	81	7	32	67	1.51	.277	9.7	3.8	8.0	4	334
Adam Wainwright	2	4	.333	4.46	8	8	0	0	0	40.1	41	5	18	40	1.46	.263	9.1	4.0	8.9	2	181
Daniel Ponce de Leon	0	2	.000	2.73	11	4	2	0	1	33.0	24	2	13	31	1.12	.205	6.5	3.5	8.5	1	132
Sam Tuivailala	3	3	.500	3.69	31	0	5	0	0	31.2	35	3	11	26	1.45	.273	9.9	3.1	7.4	2	144
Dakota Hudson	4	1	.800	2.63	26	0	2	0	0	27.1	19	0	18	19	1.35	.196	6.3	5.9	6.3	1	118
Tyson Ross	2	0	1.000	2.73	9	1	0	0	0	26.1	20	1	10	15	1.14	.222	6.8	3.4	5.1	0	104
Greg Holland	0	2	.000	7.92	32	0	7	0	0	25.0	34	1	22	22	2.24	.312	12.2	7.9	7.9	0	132
Dominic Leone	1	2	.333	4.50	29	0	8	0	0	24.0	27	3	8	26	1.46	.287	10.1	3.0	9.8	0	106
Matt Bowman	0	2	.000	6.26	22	0	5	0	0	23.0	29	4	11	26	1.74	.309	11.3	4.3	10.2	1	109
Tyler Lyons	1	0	1.000	8.64	27	0	2	0	0	16.2	24	3	8	19	1.92	.343	13.0	4.3	10.3	2	83
Tyler Webb	0	0	—	1.76	18	0	4	0	0	15.1	16	1	6	11	1.44	.276	9.4	3.5	6.5	1	66
Chasen Shreve	1	2	.333	3.07	20	0	3	0	0	14.2	14	3	9	16	1.57	.259	8.6	5.5	9.8	0	65
Luke Gregerson	0	0	—	7.11	17	0	4	0	0	12.2	14	2	6	12	1.58	.275	9.9	4.3	8.5	0	57
Ryan Sherriff	0	0	—	6.35	5	0	0	0	0	5.2	8	1	2	3	1.77	.333	12.7	3.2	4.8	1	27
Alex Reyes	0	0	—	0.00	1	1	0	0	0	4.0	3	0	2	2	1.25	.250	6.8	4.5	4.5	1	15
Preston Guilmet	0	1	.000	22.50	2	0	0	0	0	2.0	7	2	0	3	3.50	.583	31.5	0.0	13.5	0	13
Giovanny Gallegos	0	0	—	0.00	2	0	2	0	0	1.1	1	0	0	2	0.75	.200	6.8	0.0	13.5	0	5
Greg Garcia	0	0	—	0.00	1	0	1	0	0	1.0	1	0	0	0	1.00	.333	9.0	0.0	0.0	0	3
Jedd Gyorko	0	0	—	9.00	1	0	1	0	0	1.0	2	1	0	0	2.00	.400	18.0	0.0	0.0	1	6
TEAM TOTALS	88	74	.543	3.85	162	162	161	1	43	1,455.1	1,354	144	593	1,337	1.34	.246	8.4	3.7	8.3	67	6,271
Rank of 15 teams in NL	6	10	—	6	—	—	—	12	6	9	7	1	12	10	—	—	—	—	—	—	

Sources:

- 2018 St.Louis Cardinals pitching stats at Baseball Reference
- 2018 St. Louis Cardinals pitching stats at ESPN.com

== Records, awards, and milestones ==
=== Records ===
Records
Performer	Organization or venue	Accomplishment	Date	Ref.

=== Awards ===
Major League Baseball All-Star Game selections

Cardinals representing the National League
Player	Pos.	Sel. (rank)	Notes	Ref.
Miles Mikolas	P	12 pitchers	Selected for NL pitching staff, will not pitch	
Yadier Molina	C	9th time selected	Selected (injury replacement) 2009–15, 2017–18	

Other awards

Regular season awards
Performer	Date	Awards	Ref.
Marcell Ozuna	June 18	NL Player of the Week Award (June 11–17) (.455/.478/1.000 1.478 OPS, 4 HR, 8 RBIs)	
Matt Carpenter	July 23	NL Player of the Week Award (July 19–22) (.529/.619/1.706 2.325 OPS, 2 Doubles, 6 HR, 3 Walks, 1 HBP, 8 Runs, 10 RBIs, 9-for-17)	

=== Milestones ===
Regular season milestones
Performer	Accomplishment	Date	Ref.
Jordan Hicks	First Game, Strikeout	March 29	
Yairo Muñoz	First Game, PH	March 29	
Yairo Muñoz	First Career Hit	April 2	
Yairo Muñoz	First Career RBI	April 10	
Mike Mayers	First Save	April 12	
Yadier Molina	13th place in MLB history, 14,493.1 Innings Caught (passing Johnny Bench)	April 14	
Greg Garcia	First Multi-HR game; 10 Total Bases (2 HR, Double)	April 14	
Tyler O'Neil	First Game, PH	April 19	
Jordan Hicks	First Career Win	April 21	
Jedd Gyorko	100th Career HR	April 25	
John Brebbia	First Career Save	April 25	
Mike Matheny	1,000th Game managed	May 1	
Matt Carpenter	100th Career HR	May 1	
Yadier Molina	16th place in MLB history, 1,743 Games Caught (passing Johnny Bench)	May 2	
Carlos Martinez	First Career HR	May 2	
Dexter Fowler	100th Career HR	May 2	
St. Louis Cardinals	Five HRs in a game, 3 HRs in one inning (3rd inn.)	May 11	
Tyler O'Neill	First Career Hit, Run	May 18	
Tyler O'Neill	First Career HR	May 19	
Jack Flaherty	First Career Win (13 strikeouts)	May 20	
Miles Mikolas	First Complete Game, Shutout (9 strikeouts)	May 21	
Yairo Muñoz	First Career HR	May 28	
Marcell Ozuna	100th Career HR	June 2	
Austin Gomber	First Game (ML debut), Strikeout	June 2	
St. Louis Cardinals	1,000th Game at Busch Stadium III (590–410; .590 from 2006 is third-best in MLB)	June 2	
Jordan Hicks	First Career Save (3 strikeouts; 1 IP)	June 9	
Yadier Molina	1,756 Games Caught, most in MLB for one team (tied Gabby Hartnett)	June 17	
John Brebbia	First Career Win (1 strikeout 1 IP)	June 17	
St. Louis Cardinals	Franchise record 19 strikeouts by Cardinals' batters at Citizens Bank Park (Philadelphia)	June 18	
Yadier Molina	1,757 Games Caught, most in MLB for one team (passing Gabby Hartnett)	June 18	
St. Louis Cardinals	10,000th win in NL; 10,780 since 1882 inception	June 25	
Matt Carpenter	First Cardinals' player to have five hits, five runs, and two home runs in a game	June 26	
Jordan Hicks	First Career At-bat (Strikeout)	July 4	
Mike Shildt	Manager Shildt's first major league win	July 15	
Matt Carpenter	Fifth leadoff HR (2018) (ties his 2015, Lou Brock 1967/1970, Ray Lankford 1994)	July 15	
Matt Carpenter	Sixth leadoff HR (2018) (breaks his 2015, Lou Brock 1967/1970, Ray Lankford 1994)	July 20	
Matt Carpenter	First Cardinal (2nd in MLB) to have 3 HRs and 2 doubles in a game	July 20	
Matt Carpenter	Sets MLB record with 5 Extra-Base Hits in first 6 inn.	July 20	
Matt Carpenter	Ties franchise record Mark Whiten's 16 Total Bases in a game (Sep. 7, 1993)	July 20	
Matt Carpenter	First Cardinal (28th in MLB) to hit a HR in 6 consecutive games (same season)	July 14–15, 19-21	
Matt Carpenter	First Cardinal to get 12 consecutive extra base hits	July 14–15, 19-21	
Daniel Poncedeleon	First Game (ML debut), Strikeout	July 23	

== Executives and club officials ==
Source: Cardinals front office

Executive officers

- Chairman and chief executive officer: William DeWitt, Jr.
- President: William DeWitt III
- Senior vice president & general counsel: Mike Whittle
- Vice president of business development: Dan Good

Baseball Operations department

- President of Baseball Operations: John Mozeliak
- General manager (GM) / Senior VP of Baseball Operations: Mike Girsch
- Assistant general manager: Moisés Rodriguez
- Sr. Special assistants to the GM: Bob Gebhard, Mike Jorgensen, Red Schoendienst
- Special assistants to the GM: Ryan Franklin, Willie McGee, Jose Oquendo, Matt Slater
- Director of player development: Gary LaRocque
- Director of baseball administration: John Vuch
- Administrator, Minor League Operations: Tony Ferreira
- Director of scouting: Randy Flores
- Special assistant to Amateur Scouting: Mike Roberts
- Manager, Scouting Analyst: Matt Bayer
- Amateur Scouting Coordinator/Analyst, Baseball Operations: Tyler Hadzinsky
- Baseball Operations analyst: Emily Wiebe
- Manager, Professional Scouting: Jared Odom
- Scouting analyst: Stacey Pettis (Northern California)
- Scouting analyst: Jim Negrych (Northeast)
- Scouting analyst: Chris Rodriguez (Pacific Northwest)
- Scouting analyst: Alix Martinez (Dominican Republic)
- Director of International Operations: Luis Morales (12/7/17)
- Assistant director of international scouting:
- Field and academy development coordinator: Jose Leger (Latin America)
- Scouting supervisor: Jose Gonzalez Maestre (Venezuela)
- Director, Baseball Analytics & Systems: Jeremy Cohen
- Director, Baseball Development: Dane Sorensen
- Analysts, Baseball Development analysts: Kevin Seats, Brian Seyfert
- Manager, Baseball Systems: Patrick Casanta
- Director of player personnel: Matt Slater
- Director of Major League administration: Judy Carpenter-Barada
- Director of performance: Robert Butler

Manager/Coaching Staff

- Field Manager: Mike Shildt (interim, July 15- ) , Mike Matheny (through July 14)
- Pitching Coach: Mike Maddux (announced on Oct. 26, 2017)
- Batting Coach: Mark Budaska (July 15- ), John Mabry (through July 14)
- Hitting Coach: George Greer (July 15- ), Bill Mueller (through July 14)
- First-Base Coach: Oliver Marmol
- Third-Base Coach: Jose Oquendo (announced on Oct. 23, 2017)
- Bench Coach: Ron "Pop" Warner (July 19- ), Mike Shildt (announced 10/23/17-714/18)
- Bullpen Coach: Bryan Eversgerd (announced on Oct. 26, 2017)
- Bullpen Catcher/Catching Instructor: Jamie Pogue
- Coach: Willie McGee (announced on Oct. 23, 2017)
- Strength/Cond. Coach: Pete Prinzi
- Assistant Field Coordinator: Ron "Pop" Warner (announced on Oct. 23, 2017-July 19, 2018)
- Quality control Coach:

Medical Staff

- Head Athletic Trainer: Adam Olsen
- Assistant Athletic Trainers: Chris Conroy, Jeremy Clipperton
- Head Orthopedic Surgeon: George Paletta, MD
- Team Orthopedist: Lyndon Gross, MD
- Team Orthopedist: Julienne Lippe, MD
- Team Orthopedist: Husam Nawas, MD
- Team Internist: Joshua Binek, MD
- Primary Care Sport Medicine & MiLB Liaison: Brian Mahaffey, MD
- Team physician: Charles Rehm, MD
- Team physician: Alok Sengupta, MD
- Senior Medical Advisor: Barry Weinberg
- Physical Therapist: Thomas Knox
- Performance Specialist: Jason Shutt

Clubhouse Staff

- Equipment managers: Ernie Moore, Mark Walsh
- Traveling secretary: C. J. Cherre
- Visiting Clubhouse Manager: Rip Rowan
- Video Coordinator, Major Leagues: Chad Blair
- Assistant Video Coordinator, Major Leagues: Ben Bultmann

Communications department

- Vice president: Ron Watermon
- Director: Brian Bartow

Cardinals Care and community relations department

- Vice president for community relations & executive director for Cardinals Care: Michael Hall
- Vice president for event services and merchandising: Vicki Bryant

Finance and administration department

- Senior vice president and chief financial officer: Brad Wood

Stadium Operations department

- Vice president: Matt Gifford

Ticket sales, marketing & corporate sales department

- Senior vice president of sales & marketing: Dan Farrell

== Minor league system and first-year player draft ==
=== Teams ===
Level	Team	League	Division	Manager	W–L/Stats	Standing	Refs
AAA	Memphis Redbirds	Pacific Coast	American–South	Stubby Clapp			
AA	Springfield Cardinals	Texas	North	Johnny Rodriguez			
A+	Palm Beach Cardinals	Florida State	South	Dann Bilardello			
A	Peoria Chiefs	Midwest	Western	Chris Swauger			
A (SS)	State College Spikes	New York–Penn	Pinckney	Joe Kruzel			
Rookie	Johnson City Cardinals	Appalachian	West	Roberto Espinoza			
Rookie	GCL Cardinals	Gulf Coast	East	Steve Turco			
Rookie	DSL Cardinals	Dominican Summer	Boca Chica North	Frey Peniche			

=== Major League Baseball draft ===
The 2018 Major League Baseball (MLB) First-Year Player Draft began on Monday, June 4, 2018, at Secaucus, NJ, and ended on June 6. The draft assigned amateur baseball players to MLB teams.

2018 Draft Order

2018 Draft Tracker (StL Cardinals)

2018 St. Louis Cardinals complete draft list

Round	Pick	Name, Age	Pos / Bats	School (State)	Bonus amount	Date sgnd.	Notes	Refs
1	19	Nolan Gorman, 18	3B / L	Sandra Day O'Connor High School (AZ)	$3,231,700; Value: $3,231,700	Jun 11	.421/.641/.894, 10 HR; committed to University of Arizona	
Com Bal Rnd A	43	Griffin Roberts, 21 22, 6/13	RHP / R	Wake Forest University (NC)	1,664,200; Value: $1,664,200	Jun 13	5–4, 3.82 14 sts.130 K, 96.2 IP	
2C	75	Luken Baker, 21	1B / R (two-way, RHP)	Texas Christian University (TX)	$800,000; Value: $799,600	Jun 13	Comp., Lance Lynn (Minn.), missed majority of 2018 with injury	
3	95	Mateo Gil, 17	SS / R (two-way, RHP)	Timber Creek HS Keller (TX)	$900,000; Value: $587,600	Jun 13	6' 1", 180 lbs., hit .339 with six home runs, 43 RBIS in 43 games, committed to Texas Christian University	
4	123	Steven Gingery, 20	LHP / R	Texas Tech (TX)	$825,000; Value: $446,900	N/A	6' 1", 210 lbs., TJ surgery (Feb. 2018); 10–1 with 1.58 ERA in 15 starts in 2017	
5	153	Nick Dunn, 21	2B / L	University of Maryland (MD)	$310,000; Value: $333,700	Jun 13	5' 10", 175 lbs. hit .330 with ten home runs, 39 RBIs	
6	183	Edgar Gonzalez, 21	RHP / R	Fresno State University (CA)	255,900; Value: $255,900	N/A	First Team All-Mountain West; 8–2, 2.84 ERA, 110 strikeouts over 95 innings	
7	213	Brendan Donovan, 21	OF / L	University of South Alabama (AL)	$200,300; Value: $200,300	N/A	.302, five home runs, 55 RBIs in 57 games	
8	243	Lars Nootbaar, 20	OF / L	University of Southern California (CA)	150,000; Value: $163,100	N/A	14 home runs, 74 RBIs over three seasons	
9	273	Matthew Duce, 22	C / L	Dallas Baptist University (TX)	$5,000; Value: $146,800	Jun 10	.288, 23 home runs, 139 RBIs over 181 games	
10	303	Kevin Woodall, 22	1B / R	Coastal Carolina University (SC)	$5,000; Value: $138,600	N/A	.271, 40 home runs over 214 games	
11	333	Chris Holba, 21	RHP / R	East Carolina University (NC)	$125,000; Value:	N/A	9–1, 2.99 ERA	
12	363	Francisco Justo, 19	RHP / R	Monroe College (NY)	$125,000; Value:	N/A	2.01 ERA	
13	393	Colin Schmid, 20	LHP / L	Appalachian State University (NC)	$125,000; Value:	Jun 17	4.66 ERA, struck out 85 in 83 innings	
14	423	Brandon Riley, 21	2B / L	University of North Carolina (NC)	$125,000; Value:	N/A	.296 batting average with five home runs at time of draft	
15	453	Mike Brettell, 20	RHP / R	Central Michigan University (MI)	$125,000; Value:	N/A	4.74 ERA in 93 innings	
16	483	Evan Sisk, 21	LHP / L	College of Charleston (SC)	$100,000; Value:	N/A	2.96 ERA in team-high 91.1 innings	
17	513	Kyle Leahy, 21	RHP / S	Colorado Mesa University (CO)	$75,000; Value:	N/A	4.81 ERA in 2018; 1.41 ERA in 2017	
18	543	Cole Aker, 21	RHP / R	University of Tampa (FL)	$75,000; Value:$125,000	N/A	3–1, 3.72 ERA	
19	573	Josh Shaw, 21	2B / R	St. John's University (NY)	$90,000; Value:	N/A	.316, two home runs, 46 RBI, 17 doubles	
20	603	Parker Kelly, 21	RHP / R	University of Oregon (OR)	$75,000; Value:	Jun 17	3.26 ERA brother of Carson Kelly	
21	633	Michael Perri, 22	SS / R	University of San Francisco (CA)	$3,000; Value:	Jun 17	.336, nine home runs, 46 RBIs, 22 doubles; All-West Coast Conference	
22	663	Kevin Vargas, 18	SS / R	International Baseball Academy (PR)	TBA; Value:	TBA	committed to Florida International University	
23	693	Michael Baird, 22	RHP / R	Southern Illinois University Carbondale (IL)	$3,000; Value:	N/A	led team with 3.16 ERA	
24	723	Eli Kraus, 22	LHP / L	Kent State University (OH)	TBA; Value:	TBA	4.28 ERA in 2018; 2.69 ERA in 2017	
25	753	Troy Montemayor, 22	RHP / R	Baylor University (TX)	TBA; Value:	TBA	2.39 ERA; 11 saves	
26	783	Connor Coward, 22	RHP / R	Virginia Tech (VA)	TBA; Value:	TBA	5.19 ERA	
27	813	Perry DellaValle, 22	RHP / R	Seton Hill University (PA)	TBA; Value:	TBA	3.35 ERA, 113 strikeouts	
28	843	Justin Toerner, 21	CF / L	California State University, Northridge (CA)	TBA; Value:	TBA	.279, six home runs	
29	873	Alerick Soularie, 18	SS / R	San Jacinto College (TX)	TBA; Value:	TBA	freshman; can also play outfield	
30	903	Kendrick Calilao, 18	OF / R	The First Academy (FL)	TBA; Value:	TBA	committed to the University of Florida	
31	933	Ty Cohen, 19	RHP / R	Florida Institute of Technology (FL)	TBA; Value:	TBA	4.25 ERA in 2018; 3.60 ERA in 2017	
32	963	Brandon Purcell, 23	C / R	Georgia College & State University (GA)	TBA; Value:	TBA	.383 batting average	
33	993	Chris Rivera, 21	RHP / R	Long Beach State University (CA)	TBA; Value:	TBA	3.19 ERA in 23 games	
34	1,023	Benito Santiago, 23	C / L	University of Tennessee (TN)	$3,000; Value:	Jun 17	.261, seven home runs son of Benito Santiago	
35	1,053	Liam Sabino, 22	SS / R	University of Pittsburgh (PA)	$5,000; Value:	N/A	16 home runs; transferred from Vanderbilt	
36	1,083	Cole Kreuter, 22	3B / R	University of California, Irvine (CA)	$3,000; Value:	N/A	.286 batting average, six home runs	
37	1,113	Christian Caudle, 22	C / R	Texas A&M University–Kingsville (CA)	$3,000; Value:	N/A	.290 average in 2018; .384 in 2017	
38	1,143	Jaden Hill, 18	RHP / R	Ashdown High School (AR)	TBA; Value:	TBA	Arkansas Gatorade Baseball Player of the Year in 2018; 7–0, 0.51 ERA; batted .540 with 11 home runs, 43 RBIs committed to Louisiana State University	
39	1,173	Zack Gahagan, 22	SS / R	University of North Carolina (NC)	$3,000; Value:	Jun 29	hitting .268 at time of draft	
40	1,203	Andrew Warner, 22	RF / R	Columbia College (MO)	TBA; Value:	TBA	.440 with 18 home runs	
