= Bryan Eversgerd =

American baseball player and coach (born 1969)

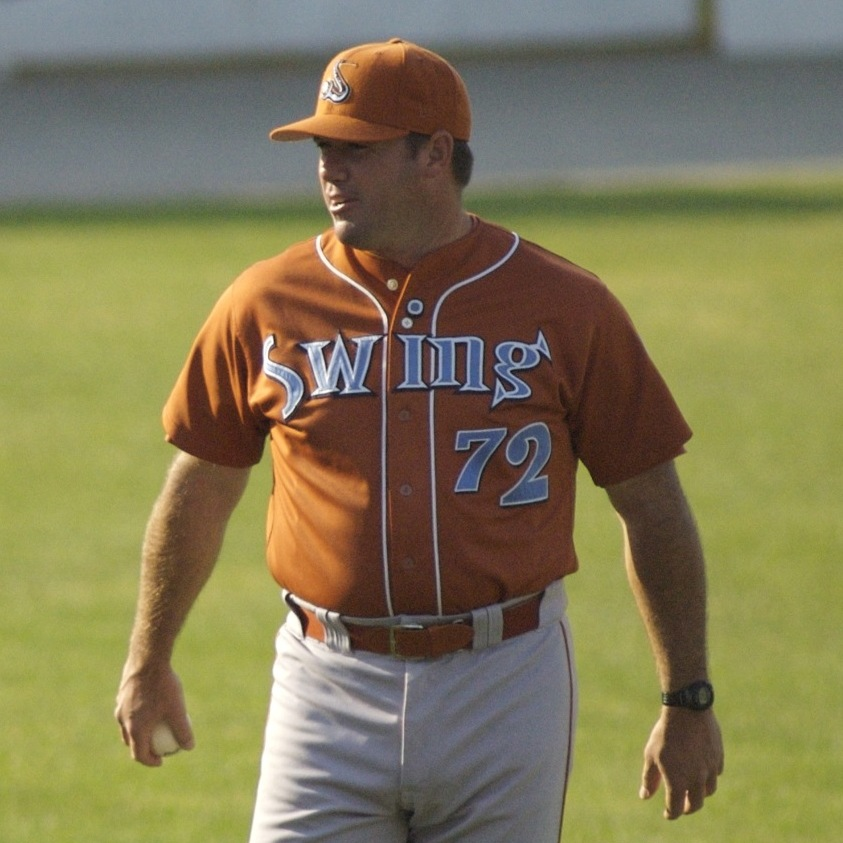
- Eversgerd as a coach with the Swing of the Quad Cities in 2006
- Pitcher
- Born: February 11, 1969 (age 56); Centralia, Illinois, U.S.
- Batted: Right Threw: Left

MLB debut
- April 30, 1994, for the St. Louis Cardinals

Last MLB appearance
- September 26, 1998, for the St. Louis Cardinals

MLB statistics
- Win–loss record: 2–5
- Earned run average: 5.16
- Strikeouts: 61
- Stats at Baseball Reference

Teams
- St. Louis Cardinals (1994); Montreal Expos (1995); Texas Rangers (1997); St. Louis Cardinals (1998)

Bryan David Eversgerd (born February 11, 1969) is an American professional baseball coach and former pitcher. He played in Major League Baseball (MLB) for the St. Louis Cardinals, Montreal Expos, and Texas Rangers, and was the bullpen coach for the Cardinals from 2018 until 2022.

== Playing career ==
Eversgerd grew up a St. Louis Cardinals fan in Carlyle, Illinois. Eversgerd, a pitcher, played college baseball at Kaskaskia College in Illinois where he would later be named to the community college's athletics hall of fame. In June 1989, Eversgerd signed a minor league contract with the St. Louis Cardinals after attending an open tryout at Busch Memorial Stadium. He made his Major League debut with the Cardinals in 1994. Before the start of the 1995 season, Eversgerd was traded as part of a package to the Montreal Expos for Ken Hill. After the 1995 season, Eversgerd was traded to the Boston Red Sox but would fail to appear for the big league club. With the Red Sox, Eversgerd met Mike Maddux, with whom he would later coach on the Cardinals. After appearing for the Texas Rangers in 1997, Eversgerd would finally return to the Cardinals in 1998 before retiring from playing in 2000.

== Coaching career ==
In 2001, Eversgerd became a pitching coach in the St. Louis Cardinals farm system with a goal of eventually becoming a major league coach for the Cardinals. The 2017 season was his fifth as pitching coach of the Memphis Redbirds. On October 26, he was promoted to the St. Louis Cardinals as their new bullpen coach. The Cardinals parted ways with Eversgerd after the 2022 season.
