= Steven Baron =

American baseball player (born 1990)

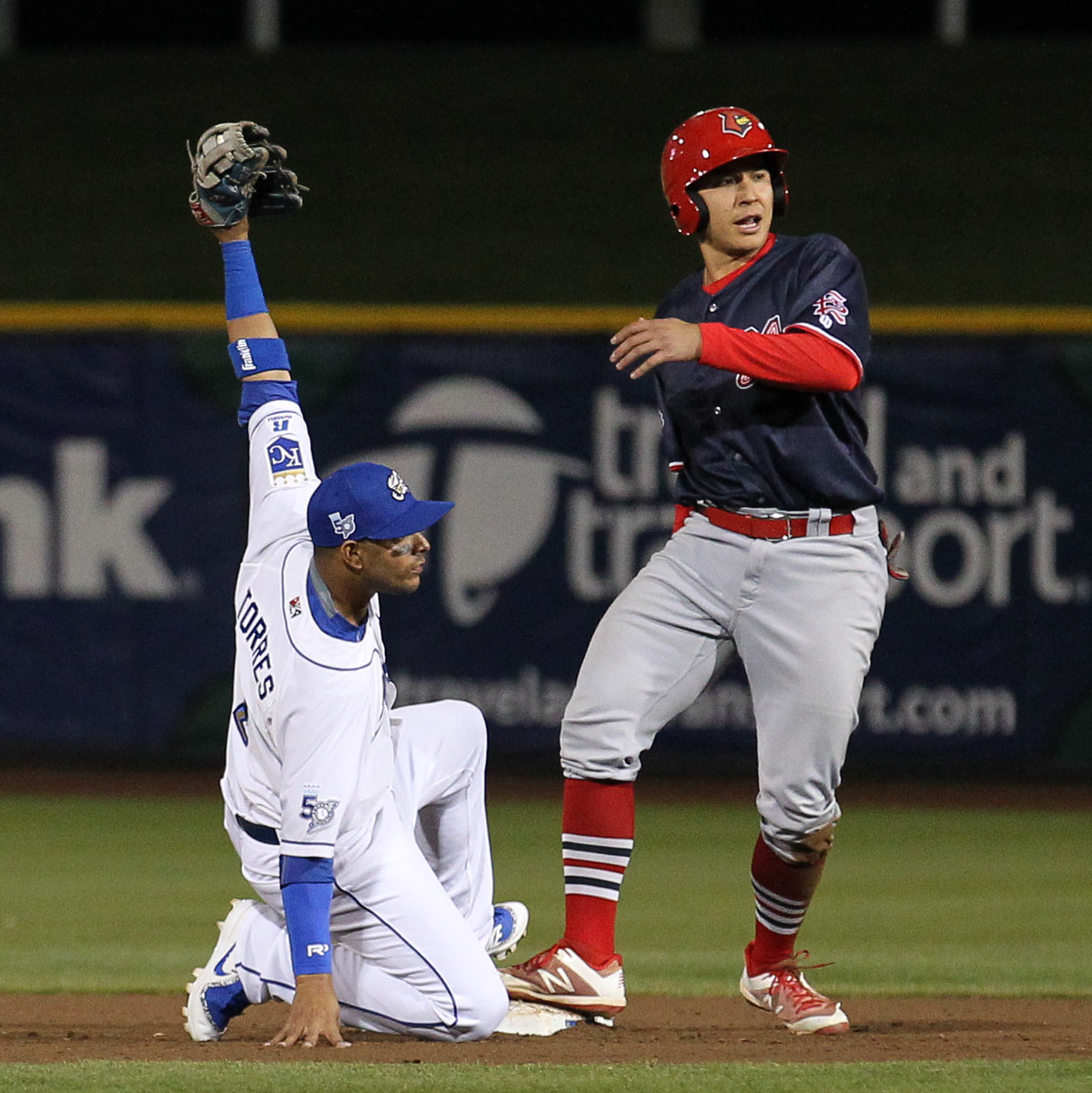
- Baron (right) with the Memphis Redbirds in 2018
- Catcher
- Born: December 7, 1990 (age 35); Miami, Florida, U.S.
- Batted: Right Threw: Right

MLB debut
- September 9, 2015, for the Seattle Mariners

Last MLB appearance
- September 28, 2019, for the Pittsburgh Pirates

MLB statistics
- Batting average: .115
- Home runs: 0
- Runs batted in: 1
- Stats at Baseball Reference

Teams
- Seattle Mariners (2015); St. Louis Cardinals (2018); Pittsburgh Pirates (2019)

Steven Phillip Baron (born December 7, 1990) is an American former professional baseball catcher. He was drafted by the Seattle Mariners in the first round, 33rd pick overall, of the 2009 Major League Baseball draft and made his Major League Baseball (MLB) debut in 2015. He attended Ferguson High School and has also played in MLB for the St. Louis Cardinals and Pittsburgh Pirates.

== Career ==
=== Amateur career ===
Baron attended John A. Ferguson Senior High School in Miami, Florida. He was considered the best defensive catcher in the '09 draft and was awarded the 2009 Rawlings Gold Glove award. Baseball America ranked him #77 amongst the top 100 prospects in the 2009 draft. He committed to play college baseball at Duke University, but was selected by the Seattle Mariners with the 33rd overall selection of the 2009 Major League Baseball draft.

=== Seattle Mariners ===
In his first professional season, 2009, Baron played for the Rookie-Level Pulaski Mariners of the Appalachian League. He batted .179 with 19 hits, six doubles, two home runs and 13 RBI in 30 games. In his first full season, he led all of minor league baseball in catcher caught stealing with 46%. Baron made his MLB debut in 2015. He is one of three catchers in Major League history to catch a one-hit major league shutout in his first ever start. He was designated for assignment by the Mariners on November 2, 2016. On November 10, he was released.

On November 18, 2016, Baron re–signed with the Mariners on a new minor league contract. He split the 2017 season between the Double–A Arkansas Travelers and Triple–A Tacoma Rainiers, hitting .242/.325/.316 with three home runs and 22 RBI across 70 RBI. Baron elected free agency following the season on November 6, 2017.

=== St. Louis Cardinals ===
On December 22, 2017, Baron signed a minor league contract with the St. Louis Cardinals organization. He played with the team's Triple–A affiliate, the Memphis Redbirds in 2018, until being recalled on May 17 due to Carson Kelly being placed on the disabled list. His first major league hit, a single, came on May 19, 2018, off of Luis García of the Philadelphia Phillies. Baron went 1–for–5 (.200) in two games for St. Louis. On June 5, he was designated for assignment by the Cardinals; he was outrighted to Memphis after clearing waivers on June 7. In 41 games for Memphis, Baron batted .213/.262/.250 with no home runs and 7 RBI. He elected free agency following the season on November 2.

=== Pittsburgh Pirates ===
On December 18, 2018, Baron signed a minor league contract with the Pittsburgh Pirates. He began the year with the Triple-A Indianapolis Indians, playing in 45 games and hitting .181/.264/.248 with two home runs and eight RBI. On September 3, 2019, the Pirates selected Baron's contract, adding him to their active roster. In 7 games for Pittsburgh, he went 2-for-10 (.200) with 1 RBI. On October 25, Baron was removed from the 40-man roster and sent outright to Indianapolis. He elected free agency on October 31.

=== Cleveland Indians ===
On July 3, 2020, Baron signed a minor league contract with the Cleveland Indians. He did not play in a game in 2020 due to the cancellation of the minor league season because of the COVID-19 pandemic. Baron was released by the Indians organization on September 20.
