= Sam Tuivailala =

American baseball player (born 1992)

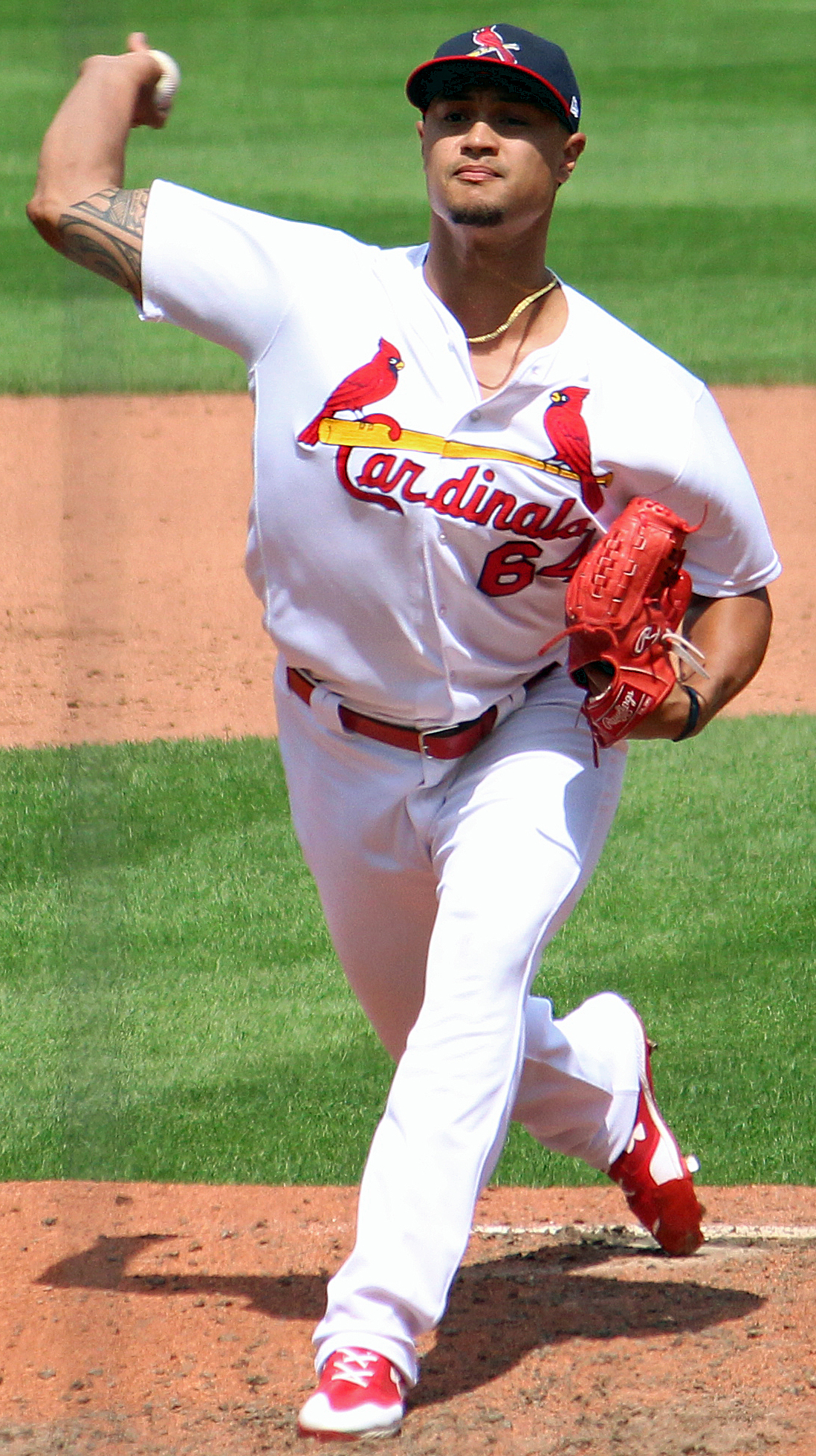
- Tuivailala with the St. Louis Cardinals
- Pitcher
- Born: October 19, 1992 (age 33); San Mateo, California, U.S.
- Batted: Right Threw: Right

MLB debut
- September 9, 2014, for the St. Louis Cardinals

Last MLB appearance
- September 28, 2019, for the Seattle Mariners

MLB statistics
- Win–loss record: 8–7
- Earned run average: 3.33
- Strikeouts: 119
- Stats at Baseball Reference

Teams
- St. Louis Cardinals (2014–2018); Seattle Mariners (2018–2019)

Samuel Johnathan Tuivailala (born October 19, 1992) is an American former professional baseball pitcher. He played in Major League Baseball (MLB) for the St. Louis Cardinals and Seattle Mariners.

== Playing career ==
Tuivailala attended Aragon High School in San Mateo, California. He was a pitcher and infielder for the baseball team along with being a quarterback on the football team, as well as playing basketball. He committed to play college baseball at Fresno State University. As a senior, he threw a no-hitter in which he struck out 17 batters. He is of Tongan and Mexican descent. He grew up a San Francisco Giants fan.

=== St. Louis Cardinals ===
Tuivailala was drafted by the St. Louis Cardinals in the third round of the 2010 Major League Baseball draft. He made his professional debut for the Gulf Coast Cardinals. Tuivailala played in the outfield, shortstop and third base during his first two seasons in the Cardinals organization. After hitting only .178/.335/.256 in 42 games in 2010 and .253/.331/.329 in 44 games in 2011, he was converted into a relief pitcher before the 2012 season.

Tuivailala made his pitching debut for the Johnson City Cardinals in 2012. He appeared in 11 games and had a 4.15 earned run average (ERA) in 13 innings with 23 strikeouts, but issued 13 walks. The next season, he played for the Peoria Chiefs where he was 0-3 with a 5.35 ERA 28 relief appearances. Tuivailala started the 2014 season with the Palm Beach Cardinals. In July, he was promoted to the Springfield Cardinals, and in August he was promoted to the Memphis Redbirds. In 48 relief appearances between the three teams he was 2-2 with a 3.15 ERA and 1.25 WHIP. He was promoted to the major leagues on September 8. He made his MLB debut on September 9, and played in two games his rookie season.

Tuivailala began 2015 back with Memphis. The Cardinals recalled Tuivailala to the major leagues on May 15. On July 1, Tuivailala was named a PCL All-Star for 2015, his first recognition as an All-Star in his minor league career. In 29 relief appearances and 27 2/3 IP, he was 3–0 with a 1.95 ERA and 23 strikeouts. He also co-led the PCL in games finished (23) and tied for third-most with 11 saves, converting all 11 opportunities. PCL managers and coaches rated Tuivailala the league's best reliever for 2015.

He pitched in 12 games for the Cardinals in 2016, going 0-0 with a 6.00 ERA, as in 9 innings he gave up 12 hits, walked 6, and struck out 7. He was optioned to Triple-A Memphis to start the 2017 season. He spent 2017 between Memphis and St. Louis; with the Cardinals, he pitched to a 3-3 record, a 2.55 ERA, and 34 strikeouts in 42 1/3 innings pitched.

Tuivailala made the Cardinals' 2018 Opening Day roster.

=== Seattle Mariners ===
On July 27, 2018, Tuivailala was traded to the Seattle Mariners in exchange for Seth Elledge. In five games out of the bullpen for the Mariners down the stretch, he logged a 1.69 ERA with four strikeouts across 5 1/3 innings pitched. In 2019, Tuivailala made 23 appearances for Seattle, recording a strong 2.35 ERA with 27 strikeouts in 23.0 innings of work. Tuivailala did not appear for the team in spring training the following year due to a right shoulder impingement. Tuivailala was placed on release waivers by the Mariners organization on March 20, 2020.

=== Acereros de Monclova ===
On April 18, 2023, after several years of inactivity, Tuivailala signed with the Acereros de Monclova of the Mexican League. He made four appearances for Monclova, registering a 8.10 ERA with one strikeout in 3 1/3 innings of work.

== Coaching career ==
On September 29, 2023, Tuivailala announced that he had been selected to participate in MLB's Diversity Pipeline Scout & Coaching Development Program. He currently works as a scout for the Mariners.

== Awards ==
- Baseball America Pacific Coast League Best Reliever (2015)
- Baseball America St. Louis Cardinals' organization Best Fastball (2015)
- Pacific Coast League All-Star (2015)

== See also ==
- St. Louis Cardinals all-time roster
