= 2018 Los Angeles Dodgers season =

2018 Los Angeles Dodgers
- National League champions National League West champions
- League: National League
- Division: West
- Ballpark: Dodger Stadium
- City: Los Angeles, California
- Record: 92–71 (.564)
- Divisional place: 1st
- Owners: Guggenheim Baseball Management
- President: Stan Kasten
- President of baseball operations: Andrew Friedman
- General managers: Farhan Zaidi
- Managers: Dave Roberts
- Television: SportsNet LA; KTLA 5 (occasional simulcasts) (Joe Davis, Charley Steiner, Orel Hershiser, Nomar Garciaparra) (Spanish audio feed) (Pepe Yñiguez, Fernando Valenzuela, Manny Mota)
- Radio: KLAC; Los Angeles Dodgers Radio Network (Charley Steiner, Rick Monday, Kevin Kennedy); KTNQ (Jaime Jarrín, Jorge Jarrin)

The 2018 Los Angeles Dodgers season was the 129th for the franchise in Major League Baseball, and their 61st season in Los Angeles, California. They played their home games at Dodger Stadium. The Dodgers suffered a season-ending injury to star shortstop Corey Seager early in the season and started the season 16–26, but went 76–45 to close out the season.

They defeated the Colorado Rockies in the National League West tie-breaker game to claim their sixth straight National League West Championship and became the first team to win six straight division championships since the New York Yankees won nine straight from 1998 to 2006 and only the third overall (the Atlanta Braves won 14 from 1991 to 2005). They opened the playoffs by defeating the Atlanta Braves in four games in the NLDS and defeated the Milwaukee Brewers in seven games in the NLCS. It was the third straight NLCS appearance for the Dodgers, a franchise record and the second consecutive National League pennant. They lost to the Boston Red Sox in the World Series, their second straight World Series loss. The Dodgers became the first team to lose back-to-back World Series since the Texas Rangers did so in 2010 and 2011, the first National League team to do so since the Braves in 1991 and 1992, the second time in L.A Dodgers history since 1977 and 1978, both against Boston's historic rival, New York Yankees, and the second occurrence in MLB to lose back-to-back World Series on home turf since the 1936–37 New York Giants, also against the Yankees.

== Offseason ==
=== Coaching/Front Office changes ===
Assistant hitting coach Tim Hyers left the Dodgers to become the hitting coach for the Boston Red Sox while farm director Gabe Kapler left to become manager of the Philadelphia Phillies and his assistant Jeremy Zoll became farm director for the Minnesota Twins. The Dodgers also chose to part ways with long-time bullpen catcher Rob Flippo, who had been in his position since the 2002 season. On November 13, Vice-President of Baseball Operations Alex Anthopoulos left his position to become Executive Vice-President/General manager of the Atlanta Braves. On December 1, the Dodgers announced the hiring of Luis Ortiz and Brant Brown to the dual role of assistant hitting coach/minor league hitting coordinator. They also announced that Brandon Gomes would replace Kapler as Director of Player Development and that Ron Porterfield would take on the new post of Director of Player Health. The Dodgers coaching staff lost two more members in December when bullpen coach Josh Bard left to become bench coach for the New York Yankees and Quality Assurance Coach Juan Castro left to become Director of Operations for the Tijuana Toros. On January 2, they replaced Bard by hiring former MLB pitcher Mark Prior to be the team's bullpen coach.

=== Roster departures ===
On November 2, 2017, the day after the 2017 World Series, several Dodgers players became free agents. They were pitchers Yu Darvish, Brandon Morrow and Tony Watson, second baseman Chase Utley and outfielders Curtis Granderson and Franklin Gutiérrez. On November 5, they declined the 2018 option on outfielder Andre Ethier, making him a free agent. Outfielder O'Koyea Dickson was outrighted to the minors and removed from the 40-man roster on November 6. On November 20, the Dodgers designated RHP Josh Ravin for assignment and LHP Grant Dayton was claimed off waivers by the Atlanta Braves.

=== Trades ===
On December 16, the Dodgers traded first baseman Adrián González, utility player Charlie Culberson, pitchers Scott Kazmir and Brandon McCarthy, and cash considerations to the Atlanta Braves in exchange for outfielder Matt Kemp. On January 4, the Dodgers made a three-team trade with the Chicago White Sox and Kansas City Royals that sent minor league utility player Jake Peter and pitcher Scott Alexander to the Dodgers, pitchers Joakim Soria and Luis Avilán to the White Sox and pitcher Trevor Oaks and minor league infielder Erick Mejia to the Royals.

=== Free agent signings ===
On December 20, the Dodgers signed a one-year contract with free agent pitcher Tom Koehler.

Off-season 40-man roster moves

Departing Player	Date	Transaction	New Team	Arriving player	Old team	Date	Transaction
Yu Darvish	November 2	Free agent	Chicago Cubs	Trevor Oaks	Oklahoma City Dodgers	November 20	Added to 40 man roster
Curtis Granderson	November 2	Free agent	Toronto Blue Jays	Dennis Santana	Tulsa Drillers	November 20	Added to 40 man roster
Franklin Gutiérrez	November 2	Free agent	Did not sign	Matt Kemp	Atlanta Braves	December 16	Trade
Brandon Morrow	November 2	Free agent	Chicago Cubs	Tom Koehler	Toronto Blue Jays	December 20	Free agent signing
Chase Utley	November 2	Free agent	Los Angeles Dodgers	Henry Owens	Arizona Diamondbacks	December 22	Waiver claim
Tony Watson	November 2	Free agent	San Francisco Giants	Dylan Baker	Milwaukee Brewers	January 2	Trade
Andre Ethier	November 5	Option declined	Did not sign	Scott Alexander	Kansas City Royals	January 4	Trade
O'Koyea Dickson	November 6	Outrighted to the minors	Tohoku Rakuten Golden Eagles				
Grant Dayton	November 20	Waiver claim	Atlanta Braves				
Josh Ravin	November 20	Designated for assignment	Atlanta Braves				
Charlie Culberson	December 16	Trade	Atlanta Braves				
Adrián González	December 16	Trade	Atlanta Braves				
Scott Kazmir	December 16	Trade	Atlanta Braves				
Brandon McCarthy	December 16	Trade	Atlanta Braves				
Luis Avilán	January 4	Trade	Chicago White Sox				
Trevor Oaks	January 4	Trade	Kansas City Royals				

== Spring training ==
Spring training began for the Dodgers on February 13 when pitchers and catchers reported to work at Camelback Ranch in Glendale, Arizona. The primary competition going into camp was in left field where Enrique Hernández, Joc Pederson, Trayce Thompson, Andrew Toles, Alex Verdugo and Matt Kemp were all competing for playing time.

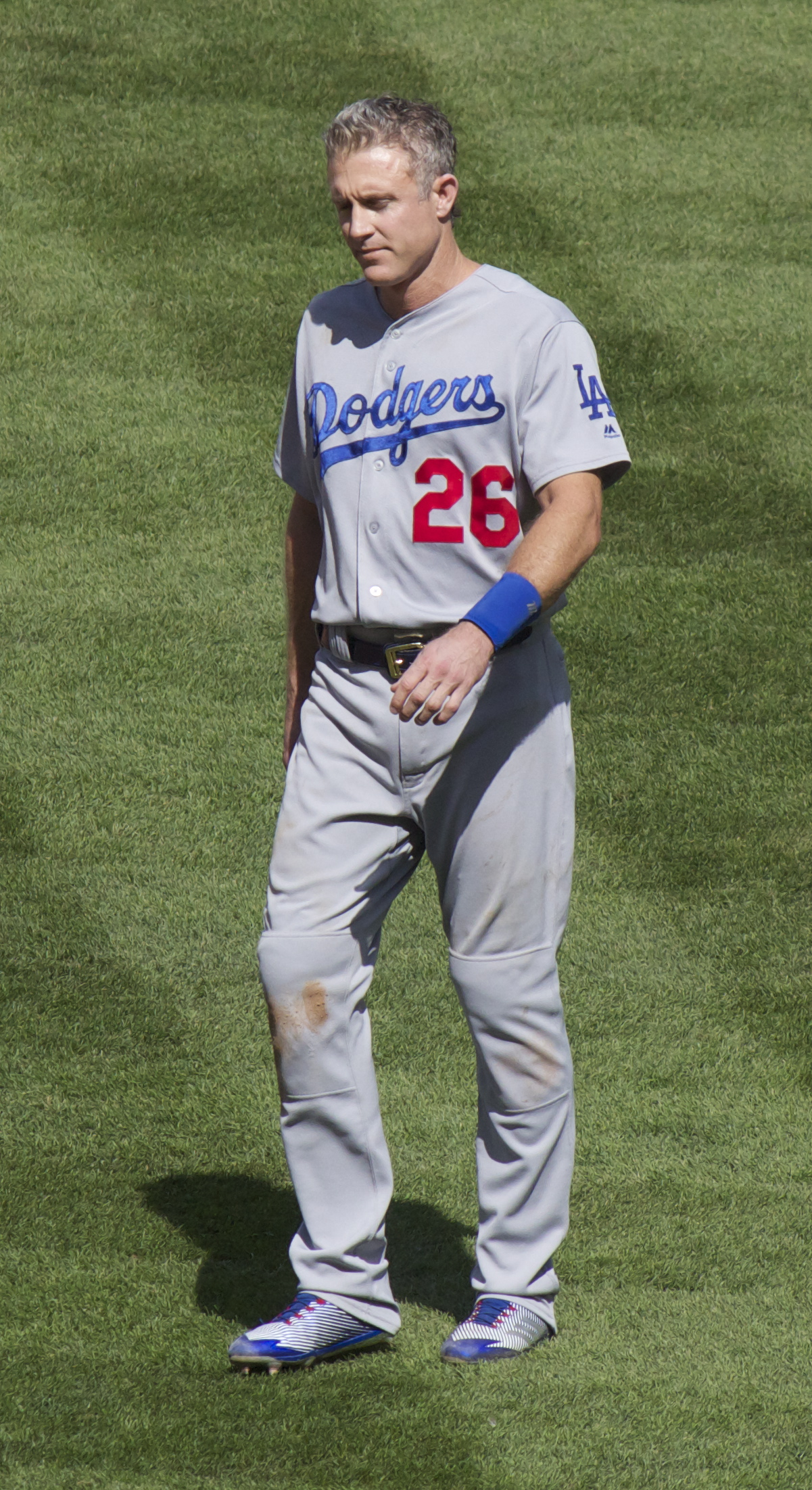
The Dodgers re-signed Chase Utley in spring training but he would retire after the season

On February 17, the Dodgers announced that they had re-signed second baseman Chase Utley to a two-year, $2 million contract. The Dodgers suffered two serious injuries during spring training, relief pitcher Tom Koehler suffered a strained right shoulder and third baseman Justin Turner suffered a non-displaced fracture of his left wrist after being hit with a pitch. They both would begin the season on the disabled list.

Outfielder Trayce Thompson was designated for assignment on March 27 when it became clear he would not win a spot on the opening day roster. The Dodgers replaced him on the 40-man roster with relief pitcher Cory Mazzoni, who was claimed off waivers from the Chicago Cubs.

== Season standings ==
=== National League West ===
NL West
Team	W	L	Pct.	GB	Home	Road
Los Angeles Dodgers	92	71	.564	—	45‍–‍37	47‍–‍34
Colorado Rockies	91	72	.558	1	47‍–‍34	44‍–‍38
Arizona Diamondbacks	82	80	.506	9½	40‍–‍41	42‍–‍39
San Francisco Giants	73	89	.451	18½	42‍–‍39	31‍–‍50
San Diego Padres	66	96	.407	25½	31‍–‍50	35‍–‍46

=== National League Wild Card ===
Wild Card standings

Division leaders
Team	W	L	Pct.
Milwaukee Brewers	96	67	.589
Los Angeles Dodgers	92	71	.564
Atlanta Braves	90	72	.556

Wild Card teams (Top 2 teams qualify for postseason)
Team	W	L	Pct.	GB
Chicago Cubs	95	68	.583	+4
Colorado Rockies	91	72	.558	—
St. Louis Cardinals	88	74	.543	2½
Pittsburgh Pirates	82	79	.509	8
Arizona Diamondbacks	82	80	.506	8½
Washington Nationals	82	80	.506	8½
Philadelphia Phillies	80	82	.494	10½
New York Mets	77	85	.475	13½
San Francisco Giants	73	89	.451	17½
Cincinnati Reds	67	95	.414	23½
San Diego Padres	66	96	.407	24½
Miami Marlins	63	98	.391	27

=== Record vs. opponents ===
NL Records

2018 National League record Source: MLB Standings Grid – 2018
Team	AZ	ATL	CHC	CIN	COL	LAD	MIA	MIL	NYM	PHI	PIT	SD	SF	STL	WSH	AL
Arizona	—	3–4	3–4	3–3	8–11	11–8	6–1	1–5	2–5	4–2	6–1	12–7	8–11	3–3	2–5	10–10
Atlanta	4–3	—	3–3	3–4	2–5	2–5	14–5	3–4	13–6	12–7	5–1	4–3	3–3	4–2	10–9	8–12
Chicago	4–3	3–3	—	11–8	3–3	4–3	5–2	11–9	6–1	4–2	10–9	5–2	3–3	9–10	4–3	13–7
Cincinnati	3–3	4–3	8–11	—	2–4	6–1	2–5	6–13	3–3	3–4	5–14	3–4	4–2	7–12	1–6	10–10
Colorado	11–8	5–2	3–3	4–2	—	7–13	2–4	2–5	6–1	5–2	3–3	11–8	12–7	2–5	5–2	13–7
Los Angeles	8–11	5–2	3–4	1–6	13–7	—	2–4	4–3	4–2	3–4	5–1	14–5	10–9	3–4	5–1	12–8
Miami	1–6	5–14	2–5	5–2	4–2	4–2	—	2–5	7–12	8–11	1–4	2–5	4–3	3–3	6–13	9–11
Milwaukee	5–1	4–3	9–11	13–6	5–2	3–4	5–2	—	4–3	3–3	7–12	4–2	6–1	11–8	4–2	13–7
New York	5–2	6–13	1–6	3–3	1–6	2–4	12–7	3–4	—	11–8	3–4	4–2	4–3	3–3	11–8	8–12
Philadelphia	2–4	7–12	2–4	4–3	2–5	4–3	11–8	3–3	8–11	—	6–1	3–3	4–3	4–3	8–11	12–8
Pittsburgh	1–6	1–5	9–10	14–5	3–3	1–5	4–1	12–7	4–3	1–6	—	3–4	4–3	8–11	2–5	15–5
San Diego	7–12	3–4	2–5	4–3	8–11	5–14	5–2	2–4	2–4	3–3	4–3	—	8–11	4–3	2–4	7–13
San Francisco	11–8	3–3	3–3	2–4	7–12	9–10	3–4	1–6	3–4	3–4	3–4	11–8	—	2–5	4–2	8–12
St. Louis	3–3	2–4	10–9	12–7	5–2	4–3	3–3	8–11	3–3	3–4	11–8	3–4	5–2	—	5–2	11–9
Washington	5–2	9–10	3–4	6–1	2–5	1–5	13–6	2–4	8–11	11–8	5–2	4–2	2–4	2–5	—	9–11

The October 1 tiebreaker games were regular-season games that are included here.

== Regular season ==
Opening Day starters
Name	Position
Chris Taylor	Center fielder
Corey Seager	Shortstop
Yasiel Puig	Right fielder
Enrique Hernández	Second baseman
Cody Bellinger	First baseman
Matt Kemp	Left fielder
Yasmani Grandal	Catcher
Logan Forsythe	Third baseman
Clayton Kershaw	Starting pitcher

=== March ===
The Dodgers began the 2018 season on March 29, 2018, at Dodger Stadium against the San Francisco Giants. Clayton Kershaw, in his team record eighth consecutive Opening Day start, allowed one run (on a solo homer by Joe Panik) in six innings with seven strikeouts but the Dodgers failed to score and lost 1–0. It was the first time the Dodgers had lost on opening day under Kershaw. In the next game, Alex Wood allowed only one hit in eight shutout innings with five strikeouts and no walks. However, the Dodgers offense again struggled, managing only one hit of their own off of Giants starter Johnny Cueto and two relievers. Joe Panik again hit a solo homer, this time off reliever Kenley Jansen in the ninth inning to give the Giants their second straight 1–0 victory. It was only the second time, and first time since the 1968 season that the Dodgers had been shutout in their first two games of the season and the first time they had lost back-to-back 1–0 games since April 24–25, 2000. The Dodgers committed four errors in the game (including three by Logan Forsythe), for the first time since the 2013 season. Kenta Maeda struck out 10 Giants in five innings his debut on March 31 and the Dodgers offense finally pushed across some runs as they picked up their first win of the season, 5–0.

=== April ===
The Dodgers finished up the opening series with the Giants on April 1, with a 9–0 victory and a split of the series. Rich Hill struck out five in six scoreless innings while Cody Bellinger hit his first homer of the season and Yasiel Puig had three hits, including a double, and scored two runs.

The first road trip of the season began on April 2 against the Arizona Diamondbacks at Chase Field. Hyun-jin Ryu struggled in his debut, allowing three runs on five hits with five walks in 3 2/3 innings. Yasmani Grandal had three hits, including a homer and Logan Forsythe also homered as the Dodgers took the lead going into the ninth. However, Kenley Jansen allowed a three-run homer to Chris Owings to tie the game and send it into extra innings. The game went into the fifteenth inning, when a Jeff Mathis pinch-hit single drove in the winning run in the Diamondbacks 8–7 win. In the following game, Clayton Kershaw allowed two solo homers in his six innings while striking out six but the bullpen imploded, walking four batters in the seventh as the Diamondbacks went on to win 6–1. The Dodgers were swept in the series when they fell in the final game, 3–0. Patrick Corbin allowed only one hit in 7 1/3 innings and struck out 12. With five loses in their first seven games, this was the Dodgers worst start to a season since 1998. After a rainout on April 6, the Dodgers played the Giants at AT&T Park. The Dodgers lost again, in 14 innings, on a three-run homer by Andrew McCutchen, 7–5. In the next game, they played their third extra inning game of the week, and ended the losing streak thanks to an RBI double by Kyle Farmer in the 10th that gave them a 2–1 win.

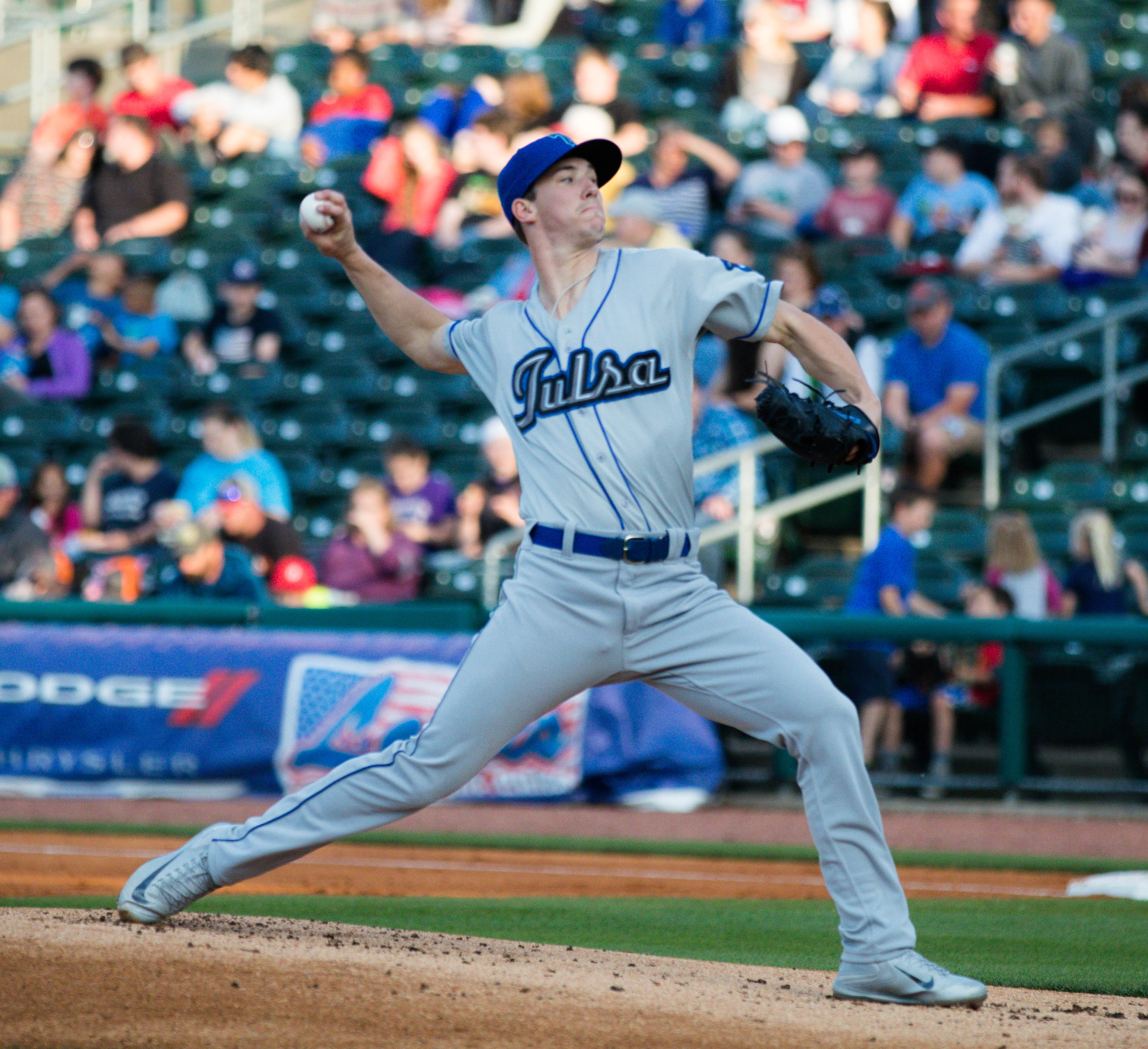
Walker Buehler, seen here with the Tulsa Drillers, pitched five scoreless innings in his first major league start on April 23.

Ryu pitched six shutout innings with eight strikeouts on April 9 against the Oakland Athletics back in Los Angeles, while Matt Kemp, Corey Seager and Chris Taylor hit solo homers in a 4–0 win. The Athletics got revenge the next day, recording 21 hits and blowing out the Dodgers 16–6. The Dodgers lost again in the next game, 8–7, to the Diamondbacks. On April 14, the Diamondbacks hit four home runs (including two by A. J. Pollock) to route the Dodgers 9–1. This was the 11th straight regular season loss by the Dodgers to the Diamondbacks, the most against one team since the move to Los Angeles. Clayton Kershaw struck out 12 in seven innings of work the next day as the Dodgers won 7–2, snapping the losing streak.

The Dodgers traveled down the freeway to play the San Diego Padres in a three-game series at Petco Park beginning on April 16. Ryu struck out nine in six innings while Matt Kemp hit a three-run home run and Yasmani Grandal hit a grandslam homer as the Dodgers won 10–3. Alex Wood struck out seven in 5 1/3 innings while allowing only one unearned run in the next game while Kemp homered to give the Dodgers an early lead. However, Kenley Jansen blew his second save of the season sending the game into extra innings. A two-run double by Grandal opened the scoring and the Dodgers won 7–3 in 12 innings. They completed their first series sweep of the season with a 13–4 win in the series finale. Kenta Maeda struck out 10 in 5 2/3 innings while Corey Seager had four hits and three RBI and Max Muncy homered.

The Dodgers returned home for a three-game series against the Washington Nationals. Max Scherzer out pitched Kershaw in the opener, allowing one run on four hits with nine strikeouts in six innings as the Nationals won 5–2. Ryu allowed only two hits in seven shutout innings the following night and the Dodgers hit three homers to beat the Nationals 4–0. The Dodgers came from behind to win the final game of the series 4–3 thanks to run scoring doubles by Grandal and Bellinger in the sixth inning. Walker Buehler made his first major league start on April 23 and pitched five scoreless innings against the Miami Marlins. Enrique Hernández was three for four with a home run as the Dodgers won 2–1. Maeda struck out seven in six innings while allowing only one run but the Marlins won 3–2 by scoring twice off Pedro Báez in the top of the ninth. Kershaw struggled in his next start, walking six (tying his career high) and allowing a three-run homer to Miguel Rojas. A comeback attempt by the Dodgers fell short and they lost 8–6.

The Dodgers then went back on the road for a four-game, three day, series against the Giants. In the opener, Ryu struck out seven in 5 2/3 innings while allowing only two runs and also drove in two runs with a double. However, the bullpen faltered and the Dodgers lost 6–4. The Dodgers played a doubleheader with the Giants on April 28 to make up the earlier rainout. In the first game, the Dodgers had a season high in runs (15), hits (20) and extra base hits (9) and Walker Buehler pitched five strong innings. They won the game 15–6. However, in the night game, Austin Jackson's bases loaded double in the fifth inning put the Giants ahead and they won 8–3. Ty Blach allowed only two runs in six innings and the Giants took the series 4–2. Before beginning the next series, a four-game set against the division leading Diamondbacks in Arizona, the Dodgers learned that Corey Seager would require elbow reconstruction surgery and would be lost for the rest of the season. Making a spot start in the first game of the Arizona series, Ross Stripling allowed eight hits and four runs in four innings and the Diamondbacks, led by A. J. Pollock's three home runs and Zack Greinke's 10 strikeouts, pulled away for an 8–5 win.

=== May ===
The month of May began with Clayton Kershaw on the mound as the Dodgers were hoping to stop the skid against the Diamondbacks. He held them to two runs on six hits in six innings of work and the Dodgers led thanks to a Cody Bellinger homer. However, the bullpen faltered again and the Dodgers lost their fourth straight, 4–3. Hyun-jin Ryu exited the next game in the second inning, due to a groin strain, but the bullpen performed in this game and Alex Verdugo doubled twice and scored both times in the Dodgers 2–1 win. The Dodgers scored four runs in the eighth inning the next day, partially thanks to two wild pitches and a balk by Jorge de la Rosa, and won 5–2 to salvage a split of the series. The Dodgers next traveled to Monterrey, Mexico for a three-game international series against the San Diego Padres at Estadio de Béisbol Monterrey, starting on May 4. Walker Buehler struck out eight without giving up a hit in six scoreless innings and relievers Tony Cingrani, Yimi García and Adam Liberatore joined on a combined no-hitter, the 12th in major league history and the first by the Dodgers, who won 4–0. A two-run homer buy Raffy Lopez in the following game, allowed the Padres to take the lead in the sixth and they piled on against the Dodgers bullpen to even the series with a 7–4 win. A two-run homer by Eric Hosmer in the fifth inning was the main blow in the Dodgers 3–0 loss to end the road trip.

The Dodgers on April 8 began a six-game homestand, starting with a two-game series with the Diamondbacks. Rich Hill returned from a stint on the disabled list to start the game but he struggled, allowing five runs on seven hits in only four innings. A home run by Kiké Hernández in the ninth tied the game and sent it into extra innings, where the Diamondbacks won in the 12th on a three-run homer by Daniel Descalso. Yasiel Puig had three hits in the next game and the Dodgers won 6–3. The Dodgers next played the Cincinnati Reds in a four-game series. In the opener, Scooter Gennett hit a two-run double off Walker Buehler in the sixth, snapping Buehler's 15 inning scoreless streak and later added a solo homer off a relief pitcher as the Reds won 4–1. Kenta Maeda allowed five runs in only 4 2/3 innings and the Dodgers offense couldn't solve the Reds pitching as they lost again, 6–2. In the next game, Ross Stripling struck out seven in 5 1/3 innings and left the game with the lead, but reliever J. T. Chargois allowed a three-run homer to Scott Schebler and the Dodgers lost again, 5–3. Despite homers by Yasiel Puig and Yasmani Grandal, the Dodgers dropped the next game also, 5–3. It was the Reds first four-game sweep of the Dodgers at Dodger Stadium since 1976. The Dodgers 16–24 record was the team's worst 40 game start since the 1958 season.

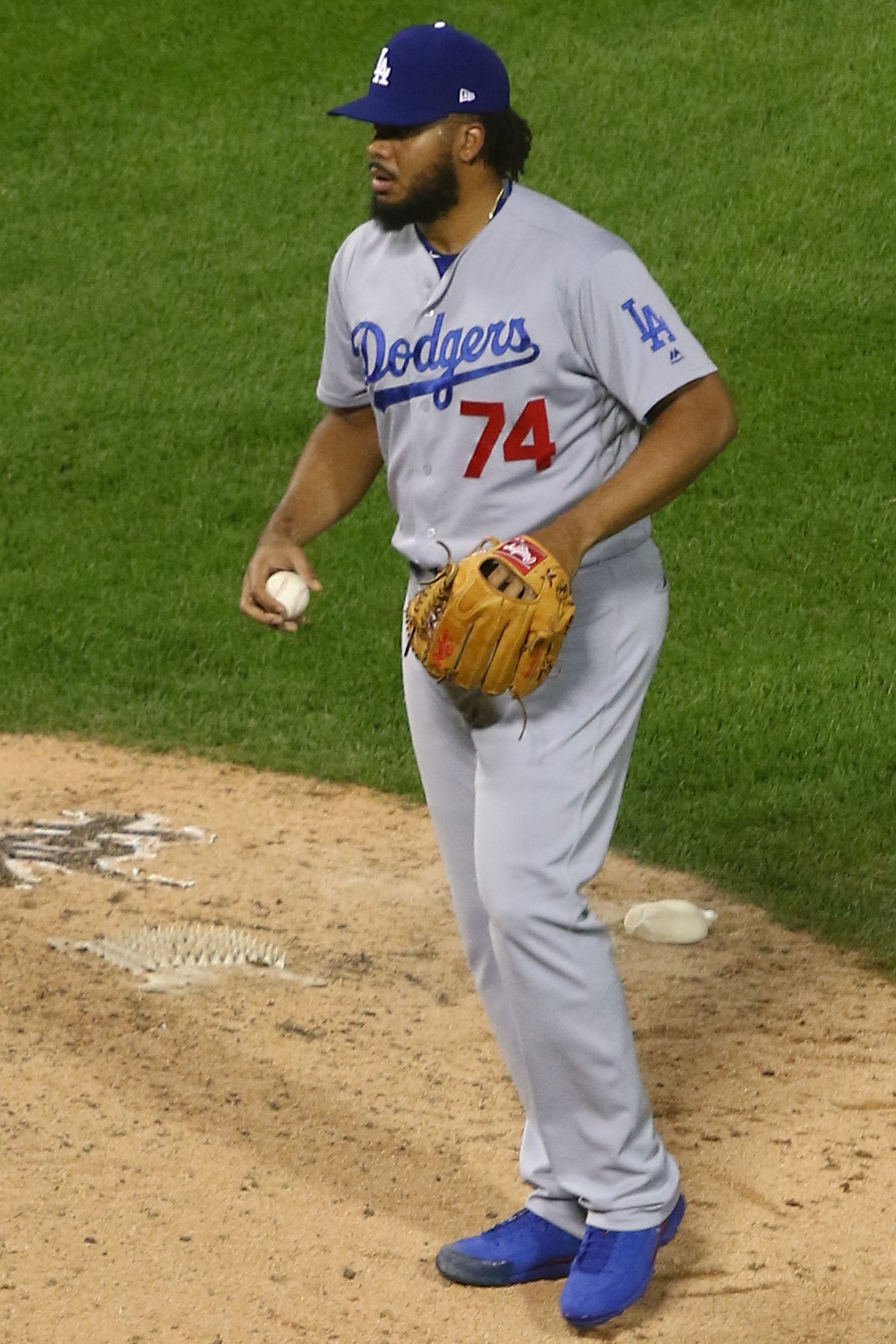
Kenley Jansen saved both games of a double-header on May 19 against the Nationals.

The Dodgers went on the road to play the Miami Marlins at Marlins Park. J. T. Realmuto had three hits including a two-out RBI double as the Dodgers lost for the fifth straight game, 4–2. They lost again the next day, 6–5, falling into last place in the division. The Dodgers finally snapped the losing streak the next day, with a 7–0 win. Kenta Maeda struck out eight while only allowing two hits in eight innings while Justin Turner had three hits in four at-bats with two doubles. Thanks to a rainout at Nationals Park on May 18, the Dodgers played a doubleheader against the Washington Nationals on the 19th. In the first game, Ross Stripling allowed only one run in six innings with a career high nine strikeouts and the Dodgers won 4–1. In the second game, Rich Hill started but only threw two pitches before leaving the game due to a blister on his middle finger, forcing the Dodgers bullpen to pitch the entire game. Nationals starter Max Scherzer allowed two runs in seven innings with 13 strikeouts, but the Dodgers rallied against the bullpen, pulling ahead with a two-run double by Matt Kemp in the ninth off closer Sean Doolittle to win 5–4. This was the first time the Dodgers had won a game where the starting pitcher failed to record an out since May 31, 1981. Kenley Jansen was the first Dodger pitcher to save both games of a doubleheader on the same day since Jeff Shaw on August 25, 2000. The Dodgers completed the sweep of the Nationals with a 7–2 victory. Alex Wood allowed only two runs in six innings and the Dodgers hit three home runs.

The Dodgers returned home on May 21 to play the Colorado Rockies. Walker Buheler struck out six in seven innings while allowing only two hits, one of which was a solo homer by Gerardo Parra. However, the Dodgers got only a solo homer of themselves (by Max Muncy) and the bullpen allowed the go-ahead run in a 2–1 loss. Chris Taylor and Puig hit back-to-back homers in the sixth inning for a 5–3 win the following day. Maeda struck out 12 and only allowed two hits in 6 2/3 scoreless innings as the Dodgers shut out the Rockies 3–0. The Dodgers next began a weekend series with the Padres. Stripling struck out 10 batters in 6 2/3 innings while Kemp had three hits in four at-bats, including a three-run homer as the Dodgers won 4–1. Christian Villanueva hit two home runs as the Padres won 7–5 in the following game. In the last game of the series, Buehler struck out eight in seven innings while allowing only one run while Max Muncy and Cody Belliger each hit two run homers in the 6–1 win. The Dodgers took on the Philadelphia Phillies on Memorial Day, falling behind 4–0 before they rallied. After failing to get a hit in the first five innings, they scored two in the sixth and three in the eighth to win the game 5–4. Jake Arrieta shut out the Dodgers over seven innings in the following game as the Phillies won 6–1. Ross Stripling dominated in the third game of the series, holding the Phillies to one run on four hits with nine strikeouts in seven innings while Kemp homered and doubled in the 8–2 win. Kershaw returned from a stay on the disabled list to allow one run in five innings but the Dodgers lost, 2–1, when they couldn't get anything going offensively against Phillies ace, Aaron Nola.

=== June ===
The Dodgers began June at Coors Field against the Colorado Rockies. In the first game, Yasiel Puig had four hit, including a homer, and Chris Taylor also homered and drove in four runs as the Dodgers won an 11–8 slugfest. In the next game, Joc Pederson hit two home runs and the Dodgers scored eight runs in the seventh inning en route to a 12–4 win over the Rockies. The Dodgers completed the sweep of the Rockies with a 10–7 win. Max Muncy hit two homers for four RBI and Yasmani Grandal also hit a two-run homer. It was their first sweep of the Rockies in Colorado since 2010.

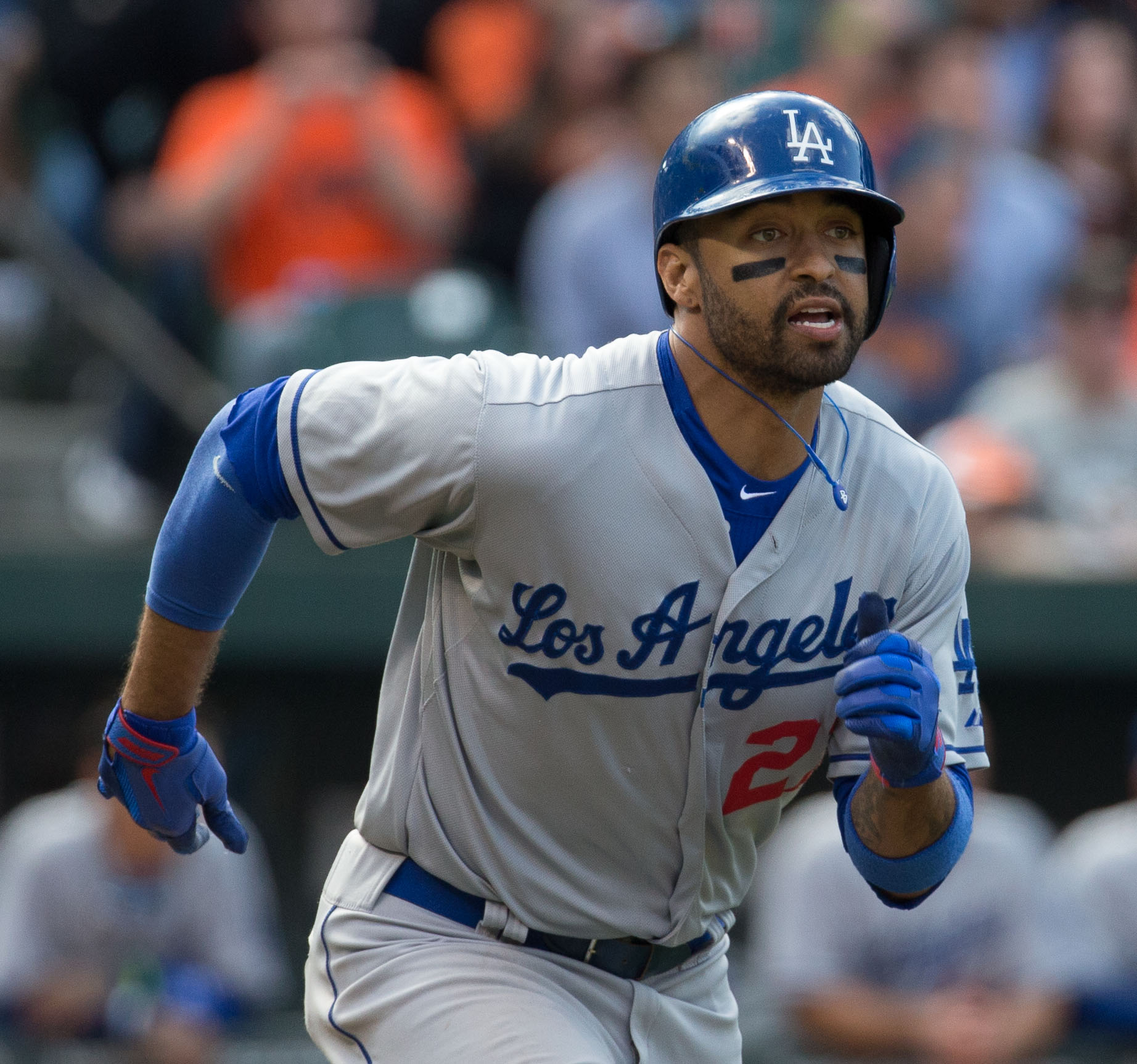
Matt Kemp had five RBI in a June 6 loss to the Pirates, and he would proceed to make his first All-Star game since 2012.

The Dodgers went on the road to play the Pittsburgh Pirates in a three-game series at PNC Park starting on June 5. In the first game, Ross Stripling pitched five scoreless innings with seven strikeouts and the Dodgers hit three home runs en route to a 5–0 shutout win. It was the Dodgers fourth straight game with at least three homers, tying the franchise record set in 1954 and also tied in 2017. In the following game, Matt Kemp had two doubles and a homer for five RBI but the pitching faltered. Caleb Ferguson, making his MLB debut hit two batters, walked three and allowed four runs in only 1 2/3 innings as the Dodgers lost 11–9. The Dodgers had another bullpen game in the finale of the series when rookie Dennis Santana was scratched from his first scheduled MLB start moments before the start of the game, forcing the Dodgers to use a franchise record nine pitchers in the nine inning game. Joc Pederson hit two home runs and Cody Bellinger had three hits, including a homer of his own, as the Dodgers won the game 8–7.

The Dodgers returned home on June 8 to play the Atlanta Braves, starting with a 7–3 win thanks to the team hitting five home runs (two by Yasmani Grandal). The Braves won the next game, 5–3. The Dodgers finished the series with a 7–2 win. Stripling allowed just two runs on two hits in 6 2/3 innings. Next came a brief two-game interleague series against the Texas Rangers starting on June 12. The Dodgers hit three more homers (Muncy, Pederson and Puig) to rout the Rangers 12–5. The Dodgers won the second game, 3–2, in 11 innings when Enrique Hernández scored on wild throw by Rangers reliever Matt Bush. Stripling picked up his sixth straight win in the next outing, on June 15 against the San Francisco Giants. Homers by Kemp and Hernández helped the Dodgers win 3–2. They both homered again the next night as they won again 3–1. The Dodgers five-game winning streak came to an end the next day when Caleb Ferguson allowed two-run home runs to Nick Hundley and Brandon Belt and the Giants won 4–1.

After a rainout on June 18, the Dodgers played a day-night doubleheader against the Chicago Cubs at Wrigley Field on the 19th. In the opener, Kyle Farmer's two-out two-run pinch-hit double in the ninth gave the Dodgers a come-from-behind 4–3 win. However, the Cubs won the next game, 2–1, as Kris Bryant tripled in the 10th inning and scored the winning run on a single by Albert Almora. In the final game of the series, the Dodgers were shut out by the Cubs, 4–0, and lost their first series since mid-May. They next traveled to Citi Field for a three-game weekend series against the New York Mets. A grand slam homer by Cody Bellinger in game one gave the Dodgers a 5–2 win. In the next game, Kemp hit his eighth career grand slam, the Dodgers first pinch-hit slam since Manny Ramirez hit one in 2009, and Max Muncy also homered in the 8–3 win. The Dodgers finished off the sweep of the Mets with an 8–7 victory in 11 innings. They hit seven homers as a team in the game, including two each by Bellinger and Hernández. This was their 12th straight win over the Mets dating back to 2016. They became just the second National League team in history to hit seven solo-homers in a road game (joining the 2006 Atlanta Braves).

The Dodgers returned home to play the Cubs on June 25 and Kenta Maeda struck out nine while allowing only three hits and one walk in seven scoreless innings while solo homers by Hernández and Chris Taylor provided the offense in a 2–1 win. In the following game, Javier Báez had four hits, including a solo homer and a grand slam, to help the Cubs to a 9–4 win. The Dodgers hit three more home runs on the 27th, leading them to a 7–5 win over the Cubs. The next day the Dodgers hit two more home runs, to give them 53 for the month, tying a club record. However, the Cubs scored seven runs off the Dodgers bullpen in the seventh inning to come from behind and win 11–5. Rich Hill struck out 10 in 6 2/3 innings on June 29 against the Colorado Rockies while Justin Turner's ninth inning homer broke the club record with the 54th of the month. However, three solo homers by the Rockies and eight shutout innings from Tyler Anderson led to a 3–1 loss. The Dodgers ended the month with another 3–1 loss to the Rockies as they couldn't solve Germán Márquez, who struck out nine in eight innings.

=== July ===
The Dodgers began the month of July with a 6–4 victory over the Rockies. Matt Kemp homered and drove in four runs in the game. Kemp exploded in the next game, with five hits, including a three-run homer, as the Dodgers routed the Pittsburgh Pirates 17–1. The Dodgers hit six more home runs, including two by Max Muncy, in an 8–3 victory in the following game. Yasmani Grandal and Chris Taylor combined for all six RBIs as the Dodgers finished off the sweep of the Pirates with a 6–4 victory on the Fourth of July.

The Dodgers traveled down the 5 Freeway to play the Los Angeles Angels at Anaheim Stadium beginning on July 6. In the opener, two ninth inning errors led to the Angels walking-off with a 3–2 win. Ross Stripling struck out seven with no walks and only three hits in six innings in the Dodgers 3–1 win the next day. A pinch hit homer by Shohei Ohtani gave the Angels a 4–3 win in the last game of the series. Next came a four-game series against the San Diego Padres at Petco Park. Clayton Kershaw allowed only two hits in six scoreless innings as the Dodgers started things off with an 8–2 win. Rookie starter Eric Lauer allowed only four hits while striking out eight in 8 2/3 innings as the Padres evened the series with a 4–1 win on the 10th. Then in the next game, Kenta Maeda struck out nine in 5 2/3 innings, his fourth straight nine strikeout game, as the Dodgers won 4–2. The Dodgers moved into solo possession of first place in the division for the first time all season with a 3–2 win on July 12.

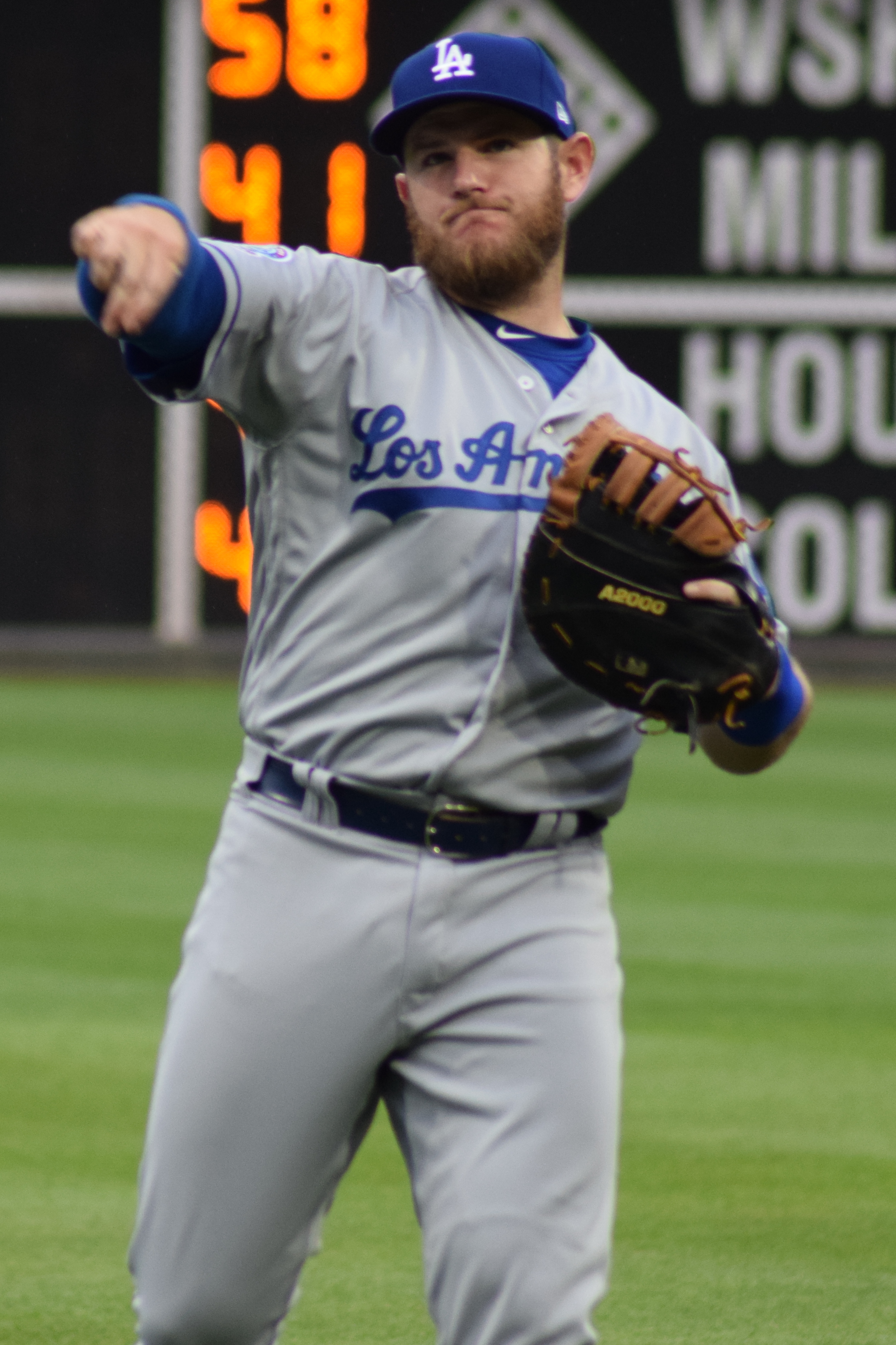
Max Muncy, who began the season in the minors, would lead the Dodgers in home runs in 2018 and also participated in the Home Run Derby at the All-Star Game

The Dodgers returned home on July 13 for another series with the Angels. Max Muncy hit a solo homer and an RBI single as they won 3–2. However, in the next game, Kole Calhoun hit a homer off Kenley Jansen in the 10th inning to give the Angels a 4–3 win. Clayton Kershaw struck out eight batters in 6 2/3 innings and the Dodgers hit two more home runs as they went into the all-star break with a 5–3 victory over the Angels and a record of 53–43, first place in the NL West.

Matt Kemp was voted by fans to start the 2018 Major League Baseball All-Star Game and Ross Stripling and Kenley Jansen also made the team with Max Muncy as a participant in the Home Run Derby. The day after the game, the Dodgers acquired all-star third baseman Manny Machado from the Baltimore Orioles in exchange for five minor leaguers.

They returned from the break with a three-game series against the Milwaukee Brewers at Miller Park. Machado reached base four times in his debut with the team, with two hits and two walks and Enrique Hernández hit a three-run homer as the Dodgers won 6–4. The Dodgers committed three errors in the next game and lost 4–2. Kemp hit two home runs as the Dodgers ran away with an 11–2 win in the finale of the series. They next traveled to Citizens Bank Park for a series with the Philadelphia Phillies. The Dodgers hit four home runs to take the opener, 7–6. In the second game, Trevor Plouffe hit a three-run home run off Hernandez, who was making his first career pitching appearance, in the 16th inning to give the Phillies a 7–4 win. Yasmani Grandal homered from both sides of the plate earlier in the game. The Phillies took the series with a 7–3 win in the final game. A five-run fifth inning, highlighted by a Carlos Santana triple was the difference. In the opener of their series against the Atlanta Braves at SunTrust Park, Rich Hill struck out eight in seven scoreless innings while Manny Machado hit his first homer as a Dodger in the 8–2 win. On July 27, Clayton Kershaw struck out eight batters in 7 2/3 innings while only allowing one run and also had a two-run single and three walks as a batter as the Dodgers won 4–1. Alex Wood pitched 5 2/3 scoreless innings with only one hit and Yasiel Puig homered and drove in three runs as the Dodgers took the next game, 5–1. In the last game of the roadtrip, the Dodgers were no hit by Braves pitcher Sean Newcomb for 8 2/3 innings before Chris Taylor singled with two out in the ninth. They lost 4–1.

A three-run home run by Eric Thames led the Brewers to a 5–2 victory over the Dodgers at Dodger Stadium on July 30. In the next game, Walker Buehler only allowed one run on five hits in seven innings with seven strikeouts, but that run was all it took in a 1–0 loss to end the month.

=== August ===
The Dodgers began the month of August with a 10-inning, 6–4, win over the Brewers. Yasmani Grandal hit two homers, including a walk-off, and Brian Dozier, who was acquired in a trade the previous day, also homered. The Dodgers finished with a split of the four-game series by beating the Brewers 21–5. They hit seven home runs in the game, including two each by Joc Pederson and Yasiel Puig and a grand slam by Cody Bellinger. Nine runs scored in the seventh, a season high, and the 21 runs scored was the most by the Dodgers since July 21, 2001 in Colorado and the most ever at Dodger Stadium. The Houston Astros came to town next, for a rematch of the two teams that played in the 2017 World Series. Justin Verlander struck out 14 batters in 7 2/3 innings while only allowing four hits as the Astros took the opener 2–1. The Astros scored four times in the sixth and seven times in the eighth to route the Dodgers 14–0 in the following game. RBI doubles by Bellinger and Dozier helped the Dodgers salvage the last game of the series, 3–2.

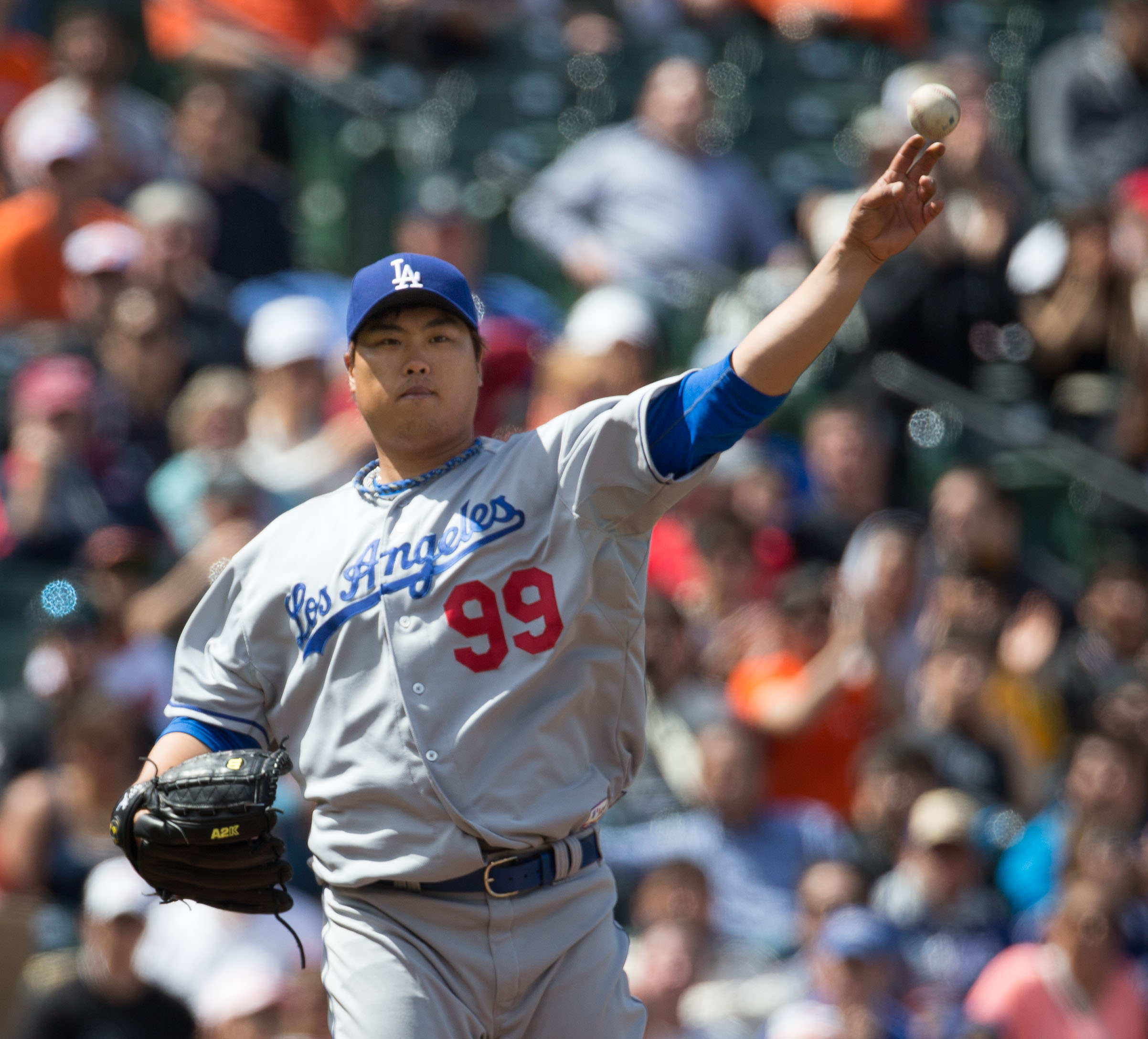
Hyun-jin Ryu, returned in August after spending three months on the disabled list and was the Dodgers best pitcher the last two months of the season.

The Dodgers traveled to Oakland Coliseum to play the Oakland Athletics in a quick two-game series, which they split. In the first game, Rich Hill allowed two runs in 5 2/3 innings in a 4–2 win. In the second game, Mike Fiers struck out eight of the first 12 batters he faced and the A's held on for a 3–2 win. The Dodgers hit five home runs, including two off Colorado Rockies closer Wade Davis in the ninth inning as they beat the Rockies at Coors Field 8–5 on August 9. A two-run homer by Ryan McMahon in the seventh inning gave the Rockies a 5–4 comeback victory over the Dodgers the following day. McMahon struck again in the next game, hitting a walk-off, three-run, home run to beat the Dodgers 3–2. A bases loaded walk by Dylan Floro in the ninth inning gave the Rockies a 4–3 walk-off win in the series finale.

The Dodgers returned home on August 13 to play the San Francisco Giants. Clayton Kershaw struck out nine while only allowing one run on four hits in eight innings but for the fourth consecutive day the Dodgers bullpen imploded, allowing four runs in the top of the ninth for a 5–2 loss. The Dodgers then lost their fifth straight game, 2–1, with the final run scoring in the ninth inning off the bullpen again. In the next game, Hyun-jin Ryu allowed only three hits while striking out six in six scoreless innings in his first game after spending 3 1/3 months on the disabled list. However, the Dodgers bullpen blew a lead for the seventh straight game. This time the Dodgers managed to win in 12 innings, 4–3, on a sacrifice fly by Brian Dozier.

The Dodgers began a series with the Seattle Mariners at Safeco Field on August 17. Walker Buehler struck out eight in six innings and Manny Machado hit two home runs as the Dodgers won 11–1. However, they lost the next day, 5–4, in 10 innings when Dylan Floro balked with the bases loaded. The Dodgers hit three solo home runs in the game. Kershaw allowed one run on four hits in seven innings with seven strikeouts as the Dodgers finished off the series with a 12–1 win.

Back home on August 20, Kenley Jansen returned from a stay on the disabled list with an irregular heartbeat to allow two back-to-back home runs in the ninth inning and the Dodgers lost to the St. Louis Cardinals, 5–3. Both Yadier Molina and Marcell Ozuna hit two-run homers as the Cardinals took the next game also, 5–2. In the final game of the series, Walker Buehler allowed only three hits while striking out nine in seven scoreless innings and the Dodgers managed just one hit (a solo home run by Joc Pederson) off of Jack Flaherty, who struck out 10 in six innings. A pinch-hit home run by Tyler O'Neill off Scott Alexander tied the game in the eighth and Paul DeJong hit a two-run homer off Jansen in the ninth to give the Cardinals a 3–1 win and a sweep of the series, their first in Los Angeles since 2006. The Dodgers began Players Weekend with an 11–1 rout of the San Diego Padres. Rich Hill struck out eight in six scoreless innings while they hit three homers among 13 team hits. Kershaw struck out nine in eight innings the following day and the Dodgers led going into the ninth (thanks to a three-run homer by Manny Machado) before Jansen blew another save by allowing a tying home run by Austin Hedges. This time the managed to eventually win thanks to a walk-off RBI double by Justin Turner in the 12th inning. Turner had a career high with five RBI in the next game, as the Dodgers swept the Padres with a 7–3 win.

The Dodgers played a quick two-game series against the Texas Rangers at Globe Life Park. Machado drove in four runs and Brian Dozier homered as they won the opener, 8–4. In the second game, Alex Wood pitched seven scoreless innings and the Dodgers hit three home runs and a triple, their only hits of the night, in a 3–1 win.

They returned home on August 30 to begin a four-game series against the division leading Arizona Diamondbacks. A three-run home run by David Peralta in the fifth inning accounted for the Diamondbacks only runs in a 3–1 win over the Dodgers. The following day, Kiké Hernández and Justin Turner hit home runs in the eighth inning to lead the Dodgers to a 3–2 comeback victory.

=== September ===
The Dodgers moved into a tie for first place in the division when Matt Kemp hit a three-run home run off Archie Bradley in the eighth inning to give them another 3–2 comeback win. In the last game of the series Walker Buehler tied his career high nine strikeouts while allowing only one earned run. For the second day in a row, Kemp drove in the winning runs, this time with a two-RBI walk-off double to help the Dodgers win their third straight game over the Diamondbacks, 3–2, to take over solo possession of first place in the division. The lead didn't last long as they fell back into second place the next day, this time behind the Colorado Rockies, thanks to a 4–2 loss to the New York Mets, thus snapping the aforementioned streak of 12 straight wins over the Mets above. A three-run, pinch-hit, homer by Brandon Nimmo in the top of the ninth was the difference. After falling behind by four runs in the next game, the Dodgers scored 11 unanswered runs en route to an 11–4 victory. Amed Rosario had three of the Mets 14 hits in the as they won the series with a 7–3 victory.

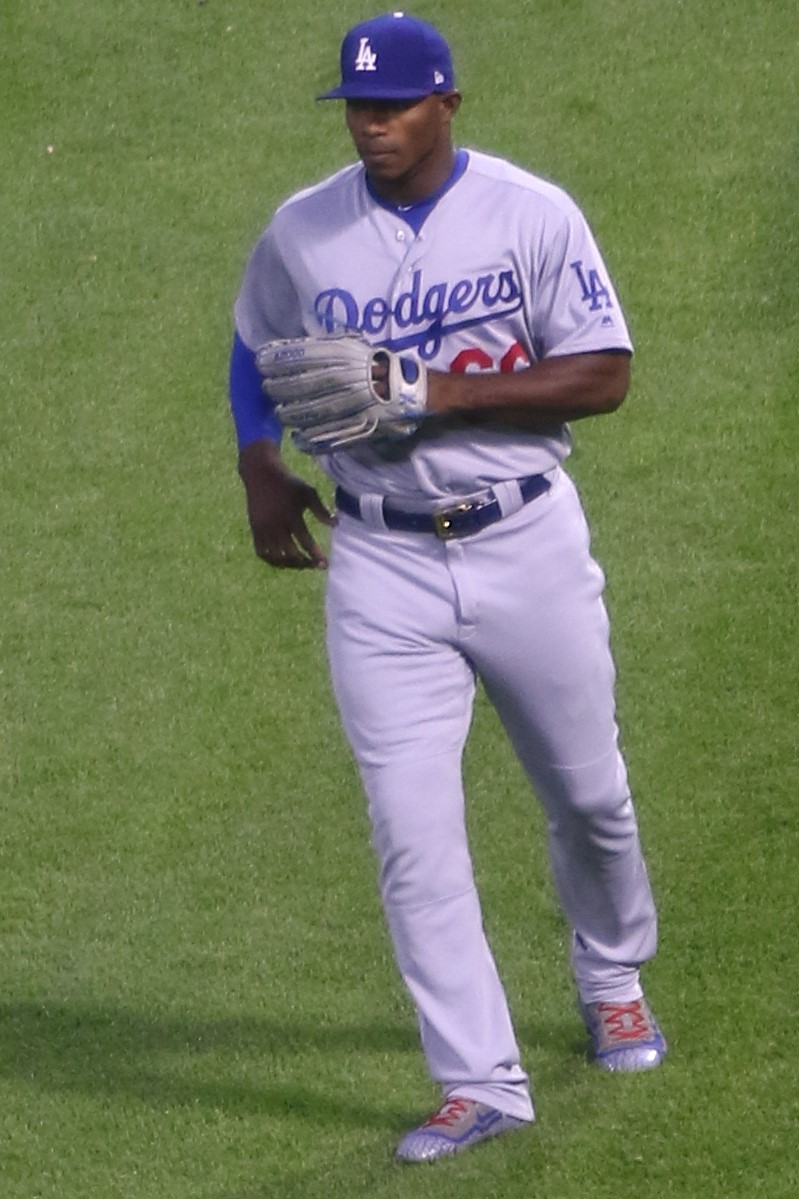
Yasiel Puig hit two home runs in a September 14 victory over the Cardinals.

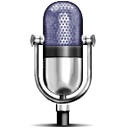
Jaime
Jarrín
Broadcaster

Honored
September 21, 2018

The Dodgers then began a 10-game road trip, starting with three against the first-place Rockies at Coors Field on September 7. Clayton Kershaw recorded his 12th consecutive quality start, the second longest streak of his career, as the Dodgers won 4–2. The Rockies won 4–2 the next day as Kyle Freeland struck out eight in six innings. Justin Turner had four hits in five at-bats, including a homer and two doubles, as the Dodgers took the series with a 9–6 win. Scooter Gennett had four hits in five at-bats with three RBI as the Cincinnati Reds beat the Dodgers 10–6 at Great American Ball Park on September 10. Luis Castillo struck out nine, while only allowing one run, in 6 1/3 innings as the Reds took the next game also, 3–1. The Dodgers took the series finale, 8–1, to avoid their first season sweep at the hands of the Reds in the 119-year history of the matchup. Manny Machado had three hits, including a home run, and three RBI in four at-bats as the Dodgers began a four-game series against the St. Louis Cardinals at Busch Stadium with a 9–7 win. In the next game, Buehler allowed only two hits in eight scoreless innings while striking out nine and Yasiel Puig hit two home runs as the Dodgers won 3–0. He followed up that performance by hitting three more homers in the next game, in a 17–4 victory. Coupled with a Rockies loss, the Dodgers reclaimed first place in the West. Adam Wainwright struck out nine in six scoreless innings as the Cardinals salvaged the final game of the series, 5–0, and knocked the Dodgers a half a game behind the Rockies.

The Dodgers returned home on September 17 for a crucial three-game divisional series against the Rockies. In the opener, Hyun-jin Ryu pitched seven scoreless innings while Max Muncy hit a three-run homer and Joc Pederson hit two homers, in an 8–2 win to recapture first place. They won again the next day, 3–2, thanks to a walk-off homer by Chris Taylor in the 10th inning. They finished off a sweep of the Rockies with a 5–2 victory. Yasiel Puig's pinch-hit, three-run, homer in the seventh inning was the big blow. Buehler struck out a career-high 12 batters in six innings and the Dodgers tied a National League record with seven players with 20 or more home runs after Kemp hit one in the second inning. The San Diego Padres came to town for the Dodgers final home series of the regular season, beating them in the opener 5–3. In the next game, a three-run homer by Manny Machado helped the Dodgers to a 7–2 win. Ryu struck out eight in six scoreless innings while Kemp was 3 for 4 with a homer and three RBI as the Dodgers won 14–0 in their final home game of the season.

With a narrow 1 1/2 game lead over the Rockies in the division race, the Dodgers began the final week of the season with a road trip to Chase Field to play the Diamondbacks. They rallied from behind to win the first game 7–4. However, a walk-off homer by Eduardo Escobar in the following game gave the Diamondbacks a 4–3 win, cutting the Dodgers lead in the division to half a game. Three homers by the Diamondbacks knocked the Dodgers out of first place entirely by beating them 7–2 on September 26. They next traveled to AT&T Park to end the regular season with a three-game series with the San Francisco Giants. A two-run homer by Justin Turner was the key in a 3–1 victory to begin the series. A tie-breaking RBI triple by Manny Machado helped the Dodgers to a 10–6 win over the Giants on September 29 as they clinched a spot in the postseason and moved into a tie for first place with the Rockies heading into the final game of the season. In that game, Rich Hill allowed only two hits while striking out seven in seven scoreless innings and the Dodgers routed the Giants 15–0. However, the Rockies also won on this day, forcing the two teams to play a tie-breaker game to decide the NL West championship.

=== National League West Tie-Breaker Game ===
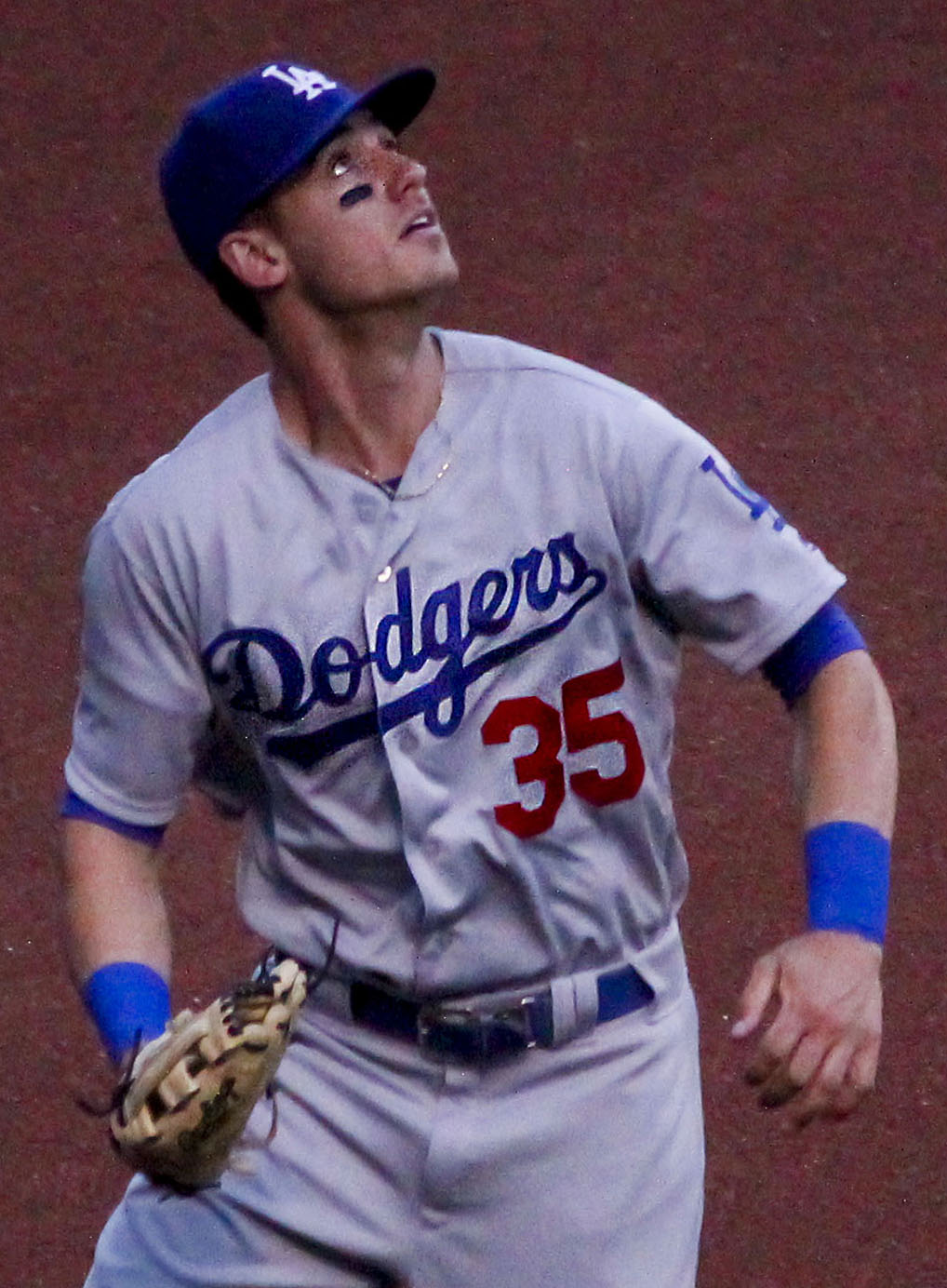
Cody Bellinger hit a two-run home run in the tie-breaker game.

The Dodgers faced the Colorado Rockies in a tie-breaker game to determine the National League West champion on October 1. Walker Buehler allowed only one hit in 6 2/3 innings and the Dodgers got two-run home runs from Cody Bellinger in the fourth inning and Max Muncy in the fifth. They won the game 5–2 to clinch their sixth consecutive division championship. They became the first team to win six straight division championships since the New York Yankees won 10 straight from 1998 to 2007 and only the third overall (the Atlanta Braves won 14 from 1991 to 2005). On October 4, they were set to play the Atlanta Braves. The first NLDS game was pitched by Hyun Jin Ryu, leaving Kershaw to pitch game 2. This was the first time in 8 out of 10 games that Kershaw has not been selected to start.

== Game log ==
2018 Game Log (92–71)
March (1–2)

#	Date	Opponent	Score	Win	Loss	Save	Attendance	Record
1	March 29	Giants	L 0–1	Blach (1–0)	**Kershaw** (0–1)	Strickland (1)	53,595	0–1
2	March 30	Giants	L 0–1	Watson (1–0)	**Jansen** (0–1)	Strickland (2)	53,478	0–2
3	March 31	Giants	**W** 5–0	**Maeda** (1–0)	Holland (0–1)	—	45,938	1–2

April (11–14)

#	Date	Opponent	Score	Win	Loss	Save	Attendance	Record
4	April 1	Giants	**W** 9–0	**Hill** (1–0)	Stratton (0–1)	—	41,866	2–2
5	April 2	@ Diamondbacks	L 7–8 (15)	Salas (1–1)	**Font** (0–1)	—	21,735	2–3
6	April 3	@ Diamondbacks	L 1–6	Godley (1–0)	**Kershaw** (0–2)	—	27,574	2–4
7	April 4	@ Diamondbacks	L 0–3	Corbin (2–0)	**Wood** (0–1)	Boxberger (2)	25,754	2–5
–	April 6	@ Giants	Postponed (rain) Rescheduled for April 28					
8	April 7	@ Giants	L 5–7 (14)	Goméz (1–0)	**Font** (0–2)	—	42,308	2–6
9	April 8	@ Giants	**W** 2–1 (10)	**Fields** (1–0)	Johnson (0–1)	**Jansen** (1)	42,374	3–6
10	April 10	Athletics	**W** 4–0	**Ryu** (1–0)	Manaea (1–2)	**Jansen** (2)	41,243	4–6
11	April 11	Athletics	L 6–16	Mengden (1–2)	**Wood** (0–2)	—	49,394	4–7
12	April 13	Diamondbacks	L 7–8	Greinke (1–1)	**Maeda** (1–1)	Boxberger (5)	43,791	4–8
13	April 14	Diamondbacks	L 1–9	McFarland (1–0)	**Hill** (1–1)	—	44,306	4–9
14	April 15	Diamondbacks	**W** 7–2	**Kershaw** (1–2)	Godley (2–1)	—	47,527	5–9
15	April 16	@ Padres	**W** 10–3	**Ryu** (2–0)	Erlin (0–2)	—	23,082	6–9
16	April 17	@ Padres	**W** 7–3 (12)	**Alexander** (1–0)	Webb (0–1)	—	22,959	7–9
17	April 18	@ Padres	**W** 13–4	**Maeda** (2–1)	Perdomo (1–2)	—	23,748	8–9
18	April 20	Nationals	L 2–5	Scherzer (4–1)	**Kershaw** (1–3)	Doolittle (4)	50,211	8–10
19	April 21	Nationals	**W** 4–0	**Ryu** (3–0)	Strasburg (2–2)	—	50,908	9–10
20	April 22	Nationals	**W** 4–3	**Fields** (2–0)	Gott (0–1)	**Jansen** (3)	51,297	10–10
21	April 23	Marlins	**W** 2–1	**Liberatore** (1–0)	Barraclough (0–1)	**Fields** (1)	46,909	11–10
22	April 24	Marlins	L 2–3	Steckenrider (1–0)	**Báez** (0–1)	Ziegler (2)	39,284	11–11
23	April 25	Marlins	L 6–8	González (1–0)	**Kershaw** (1–4)	—	39,004	11–12
24	April 27	@ Giants	L 4–6	Dyson (1–0)	**Cingrani** (0–1)	Strickland (6)	41,936	11–13
25	April 28 (1)	@ Giants	**W** 15–6	**Buehler** (1–0)	Stratton (2–2)	—	41,809	12–13
26	April 28 (2)	@ Giants	L 3–8	Cueto (3–0)	**Wood** (0–3)	—	40,608	12–14
27	April 29	@ Giants	L 2–4	Blach (2–3)	**Maeda** (2–2)	Strickland (7)	42,020	12–15
28	April 30	@ Diamondbacks	L 5–8	Greinke (3–2)	**Stripling** (0–1)	Boxberger (9)	17,562	12–16

May (14–14)

#	Date	Opponent	Score	Win	Loss	Save	Attendance	Record
29	May 1	@ Diamondbacks	L 3–4	Bracho (1–0)	**Liberatore** (0–1)	Boxberger (10)	18,940	12–17
30	May 2	@ Diamondbacks	**W** 2–1	**Hudson** (1–0)	Godley (4–2)	**Jansen** (4)	19,531	13–17
31	May 3	@ Diamondbacks	**W** 5–2	**Chargois** (1–0)	Salas (3–2)	**Jansen** (5)	21,407	14–17
32	May 4	@ Padres (Note: The May 4–6 Series is scheduled to be played at Estadio de Béisbol Monterrey in Monterrey, Mexico (See Stephen, Eric, Dodgers & Padres to play 3-game series in Mexico in 2018, SB Nation, November 13, 2017.))	**W** 4–0	**Buehler** (2–0)	Lucchesi (3–2)	—	21,536	15–17
33	May 5	@ Padres	L 4–7	Yates (2–0)	**Fields** (2–1)	Hand (8)	21,791	15–18
34	May 6	@ Padres	L 0–3	Lauer (1–1)	**Cingrani** (0–2)	Hand (9)	21,789	15–19
35	May 8	Diamondbacks	L 5–8 (12)	McFarland (2–1)	**García** (0–1)	—	45,894	15–20
36	May 9	Diamondbacks	**W** 6–3	**Báez** (1–1)	Salas (3–3)	**Jansen** (6)	45,600	16–20
37	May 10	Reds	L 1–4	Mahle (3–4)	**Buehler** (2–1)	Iglesias (5)	47,383	16–21
38	May 11	Reds	L 2–6	Brice (1–2)	**Maeda** (2–3)	Iglesias (6)	46,979	16–22
39	May 12	Reds	L 3–5	Bailey (1–5)	**Chargois** (1–1)	Hughes (1)	49,911	16–23
40	May 13	Reds	L 3–5	Castillo (3–4)	**Hill** (1–2)	Iglesias (7)	44,787	16–24
41	May 15	@ Marlins	L 2–4	Wittgren (2–0)	**Wood** (0–4)	Ziegler (6)	6,242	16–25
42	May 16	@ Marlins	L 5–6	Steckenrider (2–1)	**Báez** (1–2)	Ziegler (7)	5,721	16–26
43	May 17	@ Marlins	**W** 7–0	**Maeda** (3–3)	Smith (2–5)	—	13,820	17–26
–	May 18	@ Nationals	Postponed (rain) Rescheduled for May 19					
44	May 19 (1)	@ Nationals	**W** 4–1	**Stripling** (1–1)	Roark (2–4)	**Jansen** (7)	26,740	18–26
45	May 19 (2)	@ Nationals	**W** 5–4	**Goeddel** (3–0)	Doolittle (1–2)	**Jansen** (8)	32,378	19–26
46	May 20	@ Nationals	**W** 7–2	**Wood** (1–4)	Strasburg (5–4)	**Fields** (2)	40,201	20–26
47	May 21	Rockies	L 1–2	Márquez (3–5)	**Báez** (1–3)	Davis (17)	42,805	20–27
48	May 22	Rockies	**W** 5–3	**Chargois** (2–1)	Shaw (1–3)	**Jansen** (9)	43,719	21–27
49	May 23	Rockies	**W** 3–0	**Maeda** (4–3)	Freeland (4–5)	**Jansen** (10)	45,884	22–27
50	May 25	Padres	**W** 4–1	**Stripling** (2–1)	Richard (3–6)	**Jansen** (11)	44,612	23–27
51	May 26	Padres	L 5–7	Stammen (2–0)	**Hudson** (1–1)	Hand (16)	43,920	23–28
52	May 27	Padres	**W** 6–1	**Buehler** (3–1)	Cimber (2–2)	—	46,650	24–28
53	May 28	Phillies	**W** 5–4	**García** (1–1)	Morgan (0–1)	**Jansen** (12)	39,759	25–28
54	May 29	Phillies	L 1–6	Arrieta (5–2)	**Maeda** (4–4)	—	40,044	25–29
55	May 30	Phillies	**W** 8–2	**Stripling** (3–1)	Eflin (1–2)	—	43,302	26–29
56	May 31	Phillies	L 1–2	Nola (7–2)	**Fields** (2–2)	Domínguez (2)	40,986	26–30

June (17–9)

#	Date	Opponent	Score	Win	Loss	Save	Attendance	Record
57	June 1	@ Rockies	**W** 11–8	**Santana** (1–0)	Pounders (0–1)	**Jansen** (13)	42,711	27–30
58	June 2	@ Rockies	**W** 12–4	**Báez** (2–3)	Shaw (2–4)	—	47,703	28–30
59	June 3	@ Rockies	**W** 10–7	**Cingrani** (1–2)	Davis (0–1)	**Jansen** (14)	41,851	29–30
60	June 5	@ Pirates	**W** 5–0	**Stripling** (4–1)	Musgrove (2–1)	—	12,879	30–30
61	June 6	@ Pirates	L 9–11	Brault (5–1)	**Hudson** (1–2)	Vázquez (11)	14,327	30–31
62	June 7	@ Pirates	**W** 8–7	**Báez** (3–3)	Taillon (3–5)	**Jansen** (15)	19,713	31–31
63	June 8	Braves	**W** 7–3	**Buehler** (4–1)	McCarthy (5–3)	—	47,262	32–31
64	June 9	Braves	L 3–5	Sánchez (2–0)	**Wood** (1–5)	Vizcaíno (11)	52,718	32–32
65	June 10	Braves	**W** 7–2	**Stripling** (5–1)	Newcomb (7–2)	—	47,711	33–32
66	June 12	Rangers	**W** 12–5	**Paredes** (1–0)	Colón (3–4)	**Corcino** (1)	48,233	34–32
67	June 13	Rangers	**W** 3–2 (11)	**Liberatore** (2–1)	Chavez (2–1)	—	41,303	35–32
68	June 15	Giants	**W** 3–2	**Stripling** (6–1)	Holland (4–7)	**Jansen** (16)	53,433	36–32
69	June 16	Giants	**W** 3–1	**Wood** (2–5)	Bumgarner (0–2)	**Jansen** (17)	53,706	37–32
70	June 17	Giants	L 1–4	Stratton (8–4)	**Ferguson** (0–1)	Strickland (14)	49,541	37–33
–	June 18	@ Cubs	Postponed (rain & power outage) Rescheduled for June 19					
71	June 19 (1)	@ Cubs	**W** 4–3	**Paredes** (2–0)	Wilson (1–2)	**Jansen** (18)	39,273	38–33
72	June 19 (2)	@ Cubs	L 1–2 (10)	Zastryzny (1–0)	**Stewart** (0–1)	—	40,409	38–34
73	June 20	@ Cubs	L 0–4	Lester (9–2)	**Stripling** (6–2)	—	41,199	38–35
74	June 22	@ Mets	**W** 5–2	**Wood** (3–5)	Wheeler (2–6)	**Jansen** (19)	32,565	39–35
75	June 23	@ Mets	**W** 8–3	**Ferguson** (1–1)	deGrom (5–3)	—	37,705	40–35
76	June 24	@ Mets	**W** 8–7 (11)	**Hudson** (2–2)	Flexen (0–1)	—	34,060	41–35
77	June 25	Cubs	**W** 2–1	**Maeda** (5–4)	Underwood Jr. (0–1)	**Jansen** (20)	41,750	42–35
78	June 26	Cubs	L 4–9	Lester (10–2)	**García** (1–2)	—	53,904	42–36
79	June 27	Cubs	**W** 7–5	**Wood** (4–5)	Hendricks (5–8)	**Jansen** (21)	42,121	43–36
80	June 28	Cubs	L 5–11	Cishek (2–0)	**Buehler** (4–2)	—	52,187	43–37
81	June 29	Rockies	L 1–3	Anderson (5–3)	**Hill** (1–3)	Davis (23)	41,909	43–38
82	June 30	Rockies	L 1–3	Márquez (6–8)	**Maeda** (5–5)	Ottavino (2)	46,172	43–39

July (16–10)

#	Date	Opponent	Score	Win	Loss	Save	Attendance	Record
83	July 1	Rockies	**W** 6–4	**Hudson** (3–2)	Ottavino (4–2)	**Jansen** (22)	45,725	44–39
84	July 2	Pirates	**W** 17–1	**Wood** (5–5)	Kingham (2–4)	**Ferguson** (1)	45,207	45–39
85	July 3	Pirates	**W** 8–3	**Kershaw** (2–4)	Nova (4–6)	—	48,819	46–39
86	July 4	Pirates	**W** 6–4	**Hill** (2–3)	Holmes (0–1)	**Jansen** (23)	53,139	47–39
87	July 6	@ Angels	L 2–3	Parker (2–1)	**Jansen** (0–2)	—	44,323	47–40
88	July 7	@ Angels	**W** 3–1	**Stripling** (7–2)	Cole (0–1)	**Jansen** (24)	44,409	48–40
89	July 8	@ Angels	L 3–4	Heaney (5–6)	**Chargois** (2–2)	Anderson (4)	42,213	48–41
90	July 9	@ Padres	**W** 8–2	**Kershaw** (3–4)	Perdomo (1–3)	—	28,110	49–41
91	July 10	@ Padres	L 1–4	Lauer (5–5)	**Hill** (2–4)	—	26,272	49–42
92	July 11	@ Padres	**W** 4–2	**Maeda** (6–5)	Lucchesi (4–5)	**Jansen** (25)	26,448	50–42
93	July 12	@ Padres	**W** 3–2	**Stripling** (8–2)	Ross (5–8)	**Jansen** (26)	29,595	51–42
94	July 13	Angels	**W** 3–2	**Ferguson** (2–1)	Bedrosian (3–2)	**Alexander** (1)	53,368	52–42
95	July 14	Angels	L 4–5 (10)	Álvarez (4–3)	**Jansen** (0–3)	—	53,797	52–43
96	July 15	Angels	**W** 5–3	**Maeda** (7–5)	Cole (0–2)	**Jansen** (27)	47,871	53–43
–	July 17	89th All-Star Game	National League vs. American League (Nationals Park, Washington, D.C.)					
97	July 20	@ Brewers	**W** 6–4	**Hill** (3–4)	Williams (0–3)	**Jansen** (28)	36,812	54–43
98	July 21	@ Brewers	L 2–4	Burnes (1–0)	**Kershaw** (3–5)	Knebel (12)	36,242	54–44
99	July 22	@ Brewers	**W** 11–2	**Wood** (6–5)	Suter (8–7)	**Ferguson** (2)	38,249	55–44
100	July 23	@ Phillies	**W** 7–6	**Alexander** (2–0)	Domínguez (1–3)	**Jansen** (29)	33,753	56–44
101	July 24	@ Phillies	L 4–7 (16)	Velasquez (7–8)	**Hernández** (0–1)	—	35,028	56–45
102	July 25	@ Phillies	L 3–7	Arrieta (8–6)	**Buehler** (4–3)	Domínguez (10)	35,659	56–46
103	July 26	@ Braves	**W** 8–2	**Hill** (4–4)	Sánchez (5–3)	—	40,706	57–46
104	July 27	@ Braves	**W** 4–1	**Kershaw** (4–5)	Foltynewicz (7–7)	**Jansen** (30)	41,647	58–46
105	July 28	@ Braves	**W** 5–1	**Wood** (7–5)	Fried (1–4)	—	41,758	59–46
106	July 29	@ Braves	L 1–4	Newcomb (10–5)	**Stripling** (8–3)	—	40,303	59–47
107	July 30	Brewers	L 2–5	Hader (4–0)	**Maeda** (7–6)	—	44,933	59–48
108	July 31	Brewers	L 0–1	Miley (2–1)	**Buehler** (4–4)	Jeffress (4)	44,818	59–49

August (14–13)

#	Date	Opponent	Score	Win	Loss	Save	Attendance	Record
109	August 1	Brewers	**W** 6–4 (10)	**Floro** (4–2)	Albers (3–3)	—	41,686	60–49
110	August 2	Brewers	**W** 21–5	**Kershaw** (5–5)	Chacín (10–4)	—	45,087	61–49
111	August 3	Astros	L 1–2	Verlander (11–6)	**Wood** (7–6)	Rondón (11)	53,598	61–50
112	August 4	Astros	L 0–14	Peacock (2–4)	**Maeda** (7–7)	—	53,119	61–51
113	August 5	Astros	**W** 3–2	**Buehler** (5–4)	Cole (10–4)	**Jansen** (31)	50,628	62–51
114	August 7	@ Athletics	**W** 4–2	**Hill** (5–4)	Manaea (10–8)	**Jansen** (32)	33,654	63–51
115	August 8	@ Athletics	L 2–3	Familia (7–4)	**Chargois** (2–3)	Treinen (29)	32,062	63–52
116	August 9	@ Rockies	**W** 8–5	**Ferguson** (3–1)	Davis (1–6)	**Alexander** (2)	43,076	64–52
117	August 10	@ Rockies	L 4–5	McGee (2–4)	**Rosscup** (0–1)	Ottavino (5)	42,184	64–53
118	August 11	@ Rockies	L 2–3	Shaw (4–5)	**Chargois** (2–4)	—	47,633	64–54
119	August 12	@ Rockies	L 3–4	Davis (2–6)	**Floro** (4–3)	—	40,599	64–55
120	August 13	Giants	L 2–5	Black (2–1)	**Alexander** (2–1)	Smith (9)	45,229	64–56
121	August 14	Giants	L 1–2	Dyson (3–2)	**Maeda** (7–8)	Smith (10)	46,734	64–57
122	August 15	Giants	**W** 4–3 (12)	**Báez** (4–3)	Kelly (0–1)	—	44,987	65–57
123	August 17	@ Mariners	**W** 11–1	**Buehler** (6–4)	LeBlanc (7–3)	—	46,796	66–57
124	August 18	@ Mariners	L 4–5 (10)	Warren (2–1)	**Ferguson** (3–2)	—	43,264	66–58
125	August 19	@ Mariners	**W** 12–1	**Kershaw** (6–5)	Elías (2–1)	—	45,419	67–58
126	August 20	Cardinals	L 3–5	Cecil (1–1)	**Jansen** (0–4)	Norris (25)	42,402	67–59
127	August 21	Cardinals	L 2–5	Weaver (7–11)	**Ryu** (3–1)	Norris (26)	43,923	67–60
128	August 22	Cardinals	L 1–3	Hudson (4–0)	**Jansen** (0–5)	Hicks (5)	48,247	67–61
129	August 24	Padres	**W** 11–1	**Hill** (6–4)	Richard (7–11)	—	47,559	68–61
130	August 25	Padres	**W** 5–4 (12)	**Ferguson** (4–2)	Stock (0–1)	—	53,528	69–61
131	August 26	Padres	**W** 7–3	**Ryu** (4–1)	Erlin (3–4)	—	43,252	70–61
132	August 28	@ Rangers	**W** 8–4	**Ferguson** (5–2)	Jurado (2–4)	—	30,123	71–61
133	August 29	@ Rangers	**W** 3–1	**Wood** (8–6)	Minor (10–7)	**Maeda** (1)	29,181	72–61
134	August 30	Diamondbacks	L 1–3	Ray (4–2)	**Hill** (6–5)	Boxberger (31)	45,150	72–62
135	August 31	Diamondbacks	**W** 3–2	**Floro** (5–3)	Greinke (13–9)	**Jansen** (33)	48,965	73–62

September (18–9)

#	Date	Opponent	Score	Win	Loss	Save	Attendance	Record
136	September 1	Diamondbacks	**W** 3–2	**Maeda** (8–8)	Bradley (4–5)	**Jansen** (34)	52,394	74–62
137	September 2	Diamondbacks	**W** 3–2	**Jansen** (1–5)	Boxberger (2–5)	—	48,517	75–62
138	September 3	Mets	L 2–4	Smith (1–0)	**Maeda** (8–9)	Gsellman (10)	45,206	75–63
139	September 4	Mets	**W** 11–4	**Hill** (7–5)	Vargas (5–9)	—	46,651	76–63
140	September 5	Mets	L 3–7	Wheeler (10–7)	**Ryu** (4–2)	—	40,317	76–64
141	September 7	@ Rockies	**W** 4–2	**Kershaw** (7–5)	Rusin (2–3)	**Maeda** (2)	41,547	77–64
142	September 8	@ Rockies	L 2–4	Freeland (14–7)	**Buehler** (6–5)	Davis (39)	47,867	77–65
143	September 9	@ Rockies	**W** 9–6	**Hill** (8–5)	Anderson (6–8)	**Alexander** (3)	40,157	78–65
144	September 10	@ Reds	L 6–10	Hughes (4–3)	**Wood** (8–7)	—	12,161	78–66
145	September 11	@ Reds	L 1–3	Castillo (9–12)	**Ryu** (4–3)	Iglesias (25)	14,964	78–67
146	September 12	@ Reds	**W** 8–1	**Ferguson** (6–2)	DeSclafani (7–5)	—	15,633	79–67
147	September 13	@ Cardinals	**W** 9–7	**Kershaw** (8–5)	Gomber (5–1)	—	40,997	80–67
148	September 14	@ Cardinals	**W** 3–0	**Buehler** (7–5)	Flaherty (8–7)	**Jansen** (35)	46,036	81–67
149	September 15	@ Cardinals	**W** 17–4	**Hill** (9–5)	Gant (7–6)	—	45,481	82–67
150	September 16	@ Cardinals	L 0–5	Wainwright (2–3)	**Stripling** (8–4)	—	45,217	82–68
151	September 17	Rockies	**W** 8–2	**Ryu** (5–3)	Gray (11–8)	—	45,970	83–68
152	September 18	Rockies	**W** 3–2 (10)	**Floro** (6–3)	Ottavino (6–4)	—	49,537	84–68
153	September 19	Rockies	**W** 5–2	**Ferguson** (7–2)	Oberg (7–1)	**Jansen** (36)	50,141	85–68
154	September 21	Padres	L 3–5	Lauer (6–7)	**Stripling** (8–5)	Yates (10)	52,458	85–69
155	September 22	Padres	**W** 7–2	**Hill** (10–5)	Nix (2–4)	**Jansen** (37)	53,536	86–69
156	September 23	Padres	**W** 14–0	**Ryu** (6–3)	Lucchesi (8–9)	—	50,250	87–69
157	September 24	@ Diamondbacks	**W** 7–4	**Kershaw** (9–5)	Chafin (1–6)	—	26,067	88–69
158	September 25	@ Diamondbacks	L 3–4	Boxberger (3–7)	**Maeda** (8–10)	—	25,774	88–70
159	September 26	@ Diamondbacks	L 2–7	Greinke (15–11)	**Stripling** (8–6)	—	31,149	88–71
160	September 28	@ Giants	**W** 3–1	**Ryu** (7–3)	Bumgarner (6–7)	**Jansen** (38)	41,167	89–71
161	September 29	@ Giants	**W** 10–6	**Wood** (9–7)	Melancon (1–4)	—	41,768	90–71
162	September 30	@ Giants	**W** 15–0	**Hill** (11–5)	Suárez (7–13)	—	41,280	91–71

October (1–0)

#	Date	Opponent	Score	Win	Loss	Save	Attendance	Record
163	October 1	Rockies	**W** 5–2	**Buehler** (8–5)	Márquez (14–11)	—	47,816	92–71

Legend: = Win = Loss = Postponement
Bold = Dodgers team member

== Postseason ==
=== National League Division Series ===
The Dodgers, as the second seed in the National League, opened the playoffs with home field advantage in the 2018 National League Division Series against the third seeded Atlanta Braves.

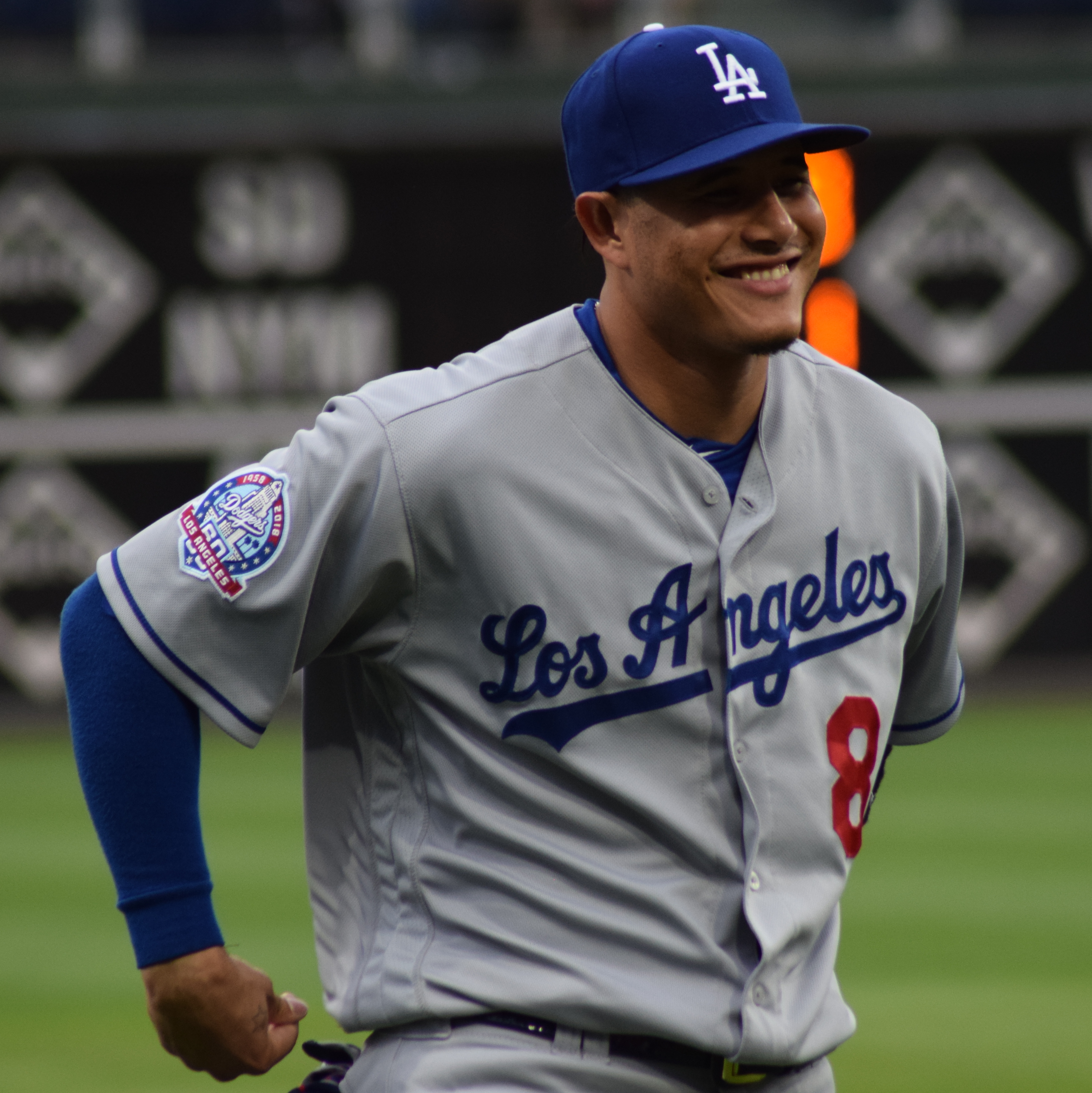
Manny Machado, who joined the Dodgers at the trade deadline, had two hits and four RBIs in Game 4 of the NLDS.

In the first game, Hyun-jin Ryu got the start in a surprise decision over Clayton Kershaw, who had started the Dodgers six previous playoff openers. He pitched well, with seven shutout innings, striking out eight while allowing only four hits and no walks. Joc Pederson hit a leadoff homer, Max Muncy added a three-run shot the next inning and the Dodgers cruised to a 6–0 victory.

Kershaw started the second game, and pitched eight scoreless innings, while allowing only two hits. Manny Machado hit a two-run home run in the first inning and Yasmani Grandal added a solo homer in the fifth inning to account for the only scoring in the Dodgers 3–0 win. They were only the second team in history to shutout their opponent in the first two playoff games, joining the 1921 New York Yankees.

Walker Buehler started game three for the Dodgers at SunTrust Park, while Sean Newcomb started for the Braves. Atlanta took a 5–0 lead in the bottom of the second inning. The first run came when Sean Newcomb forced a run with a bases-loaded walk, the first time in postseason history a pitcher has done this. Four more runs were scored on a grand slam by Ronald Acuña Jr. Los Angeles got back two runs in the top of the third, on an RBI single by Justin Turner with the second run scoring on error by Acuña. A two-run homer by Chris Taylor and a solo homer by Muncy tied the game in the fifth inning. After the second inning, Buehler settled down and pitched five innings with only two hits and seven strikeouts. He also walked two and allowed the five runs. The Braves recaptured the lead when Freddie Freeman homered off Alex Wood in the sixth inning. The Dodgers got a couple of baserunners on in the ninth but Arodys Vizcaíno managed to close out the win for the Braves, 6–5, forcing the series to a fourth game.

In the fourth game, Rich Hill started and pitched 4 1/3 innings, allowing two runs on four hits and five walks. Machado drove in four runs, on a double and a three-run home run and David Freese drove in two with a pinch-hit single as the Dodgers won 6–2 to clinch the series and advance to the National League Championship Series for the third straight year, a franchise record.

=== National League Championship Series ===
Clayton Kershaw started the first game for the Dodgers at Miller Park and turned in the shortest start of his post-season career, allowing five runs on six hits and two walks in 3+ innings and Yasmani Grandal became the first catcher in post-season history to have two walks and two passed balls in the same game. The Dodgers fell behind 6–1 before a late inning rally against the Brewers bullpen cut the final score to 6–5.

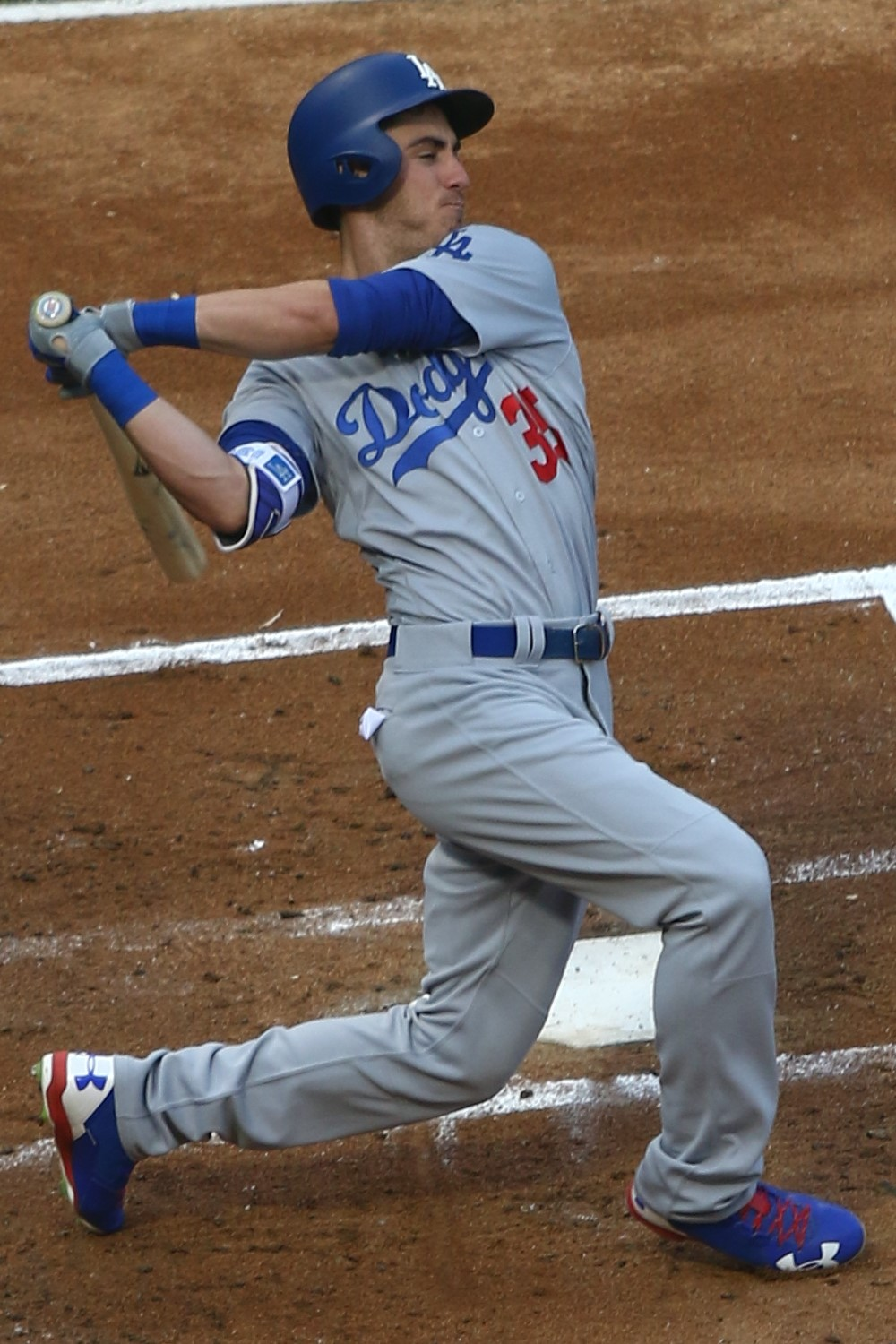
Cody Bellinger had the game winning RBI single in the 13th inning in Game 4 to tie the NLCS at two games apiece.

In the second game, Hyun-jin Ryu pitched four scoreless innings but couldn't make it out of the fifth. He wound up going 4 1/3 innings while allowing two runs on six hits. The Brewers took a 3–0 lead after six but the Dodgers got two back in the seventh and then pulled ahead on a two-run homer by Justin Turner in the eighth to win 4–3 and even the series up after two games.

The series moved to Dodger Stadium for game three and Walker Buehler pitched seven innings, with four runs on five hits and eight strikeouts... but the Dodgers were unable to score any runs against Jhoulys Chacín and the Brewers bullpen and lost 4–0. It was the first time the Dodgers had been shut out in a postseason game at home since the 1983 National League Championship Series against the Philadelphia Phillies.

Rich Hill started game four and only allowed one run on three hits and three walks with six strikeouts in five innings. However, the Dodgers, after a first-inning run, were unable to score in regulation and the game went into extra-innings tied at one. In the 13th inning, Manny Machado singled, advanced to second on a wild pitch, and scored the winning run on a single to right by Cody Bellinger to give the Dodgers a 2–1 win.

In the fifth game, Kershaw pitched seven innings, allowing one run on three hits and two walks while striking out nine. He also walked twice as a batter, becoming just the third pitcher in the last 20 years to do so in a postseason game (Jon Lester in the 2016 NLCS and Derek Lowe in the 2008 NLDS). The Dodgers scored five runs on nine hits to win the game 5–2 and take a three games to two series lead.

The series returned to Miller Park for game 6 and Ryu struggled in his second start, allowing five runs on seven hits in three innings as the Dodgers lost 7–2. However, in game 7, Buehler pitched a strong game, striking out seven and only allowing one run in 4 2/3 innings. Cody Bellinger hit a two-run homer and Yasiel Puig hit a three-run homer and the Dodgers won 5–1 to clinch their second straight National League championship, the first time they had done that since 1977 and 1978.

=== World Series ===
The Dodgers faced the Boston Red Sox, who had the best record in baseball in 2018, in the World Series. The series began at Fenway Park as the Red Sox had secured homefield advantage. Kershaw became the first pitcher to start the first game of the World Series in back-to-back years since Cliff Lee did so in 2009 (for the Phillies) and 2010 (for the Rangers) and the first to do so for the same team since Dave Stewart pitched three consecutive Game 1s for the Oakland Athletics from 1988 to 1990. His results were not good, allowing five runs on seven hits and three walks with five strikeouts in 4+ innings. The Dodgers kept it close most of the game thanks to a Matt Kemp homer and three RBI by Manny Machado but the Red Sox pulled away when Eduardo Núñez hit a three-run pinch-hit homer off Alex Wood in the eighth to win the game, 8–4.

Hyun-jin Ryu kept things close in game two and the Dodgers led 2–1 through four innings before Ryu loaded the bases in the fifth and reliever Ryan Madson walked in the tying run and then gave up a single that scored two more, and the Dodgers lost 4–2.

The series moved to Dodger Stadium for Game 3. Walker Buehler pitched seven shutout innings, allowing only two hits without walking anyone and striking out seven while throwing a career-high 108 pitches. The Dodgers took an early lead on Joc Pederson' solo homer in the third inning and that lead held up until two outs in the eighth when Jackie Bradley Jr. homered off of Kenley Jansen to tie the game. Both sides added a run in the 13th inning thanks to sloppy fielding and the game continued into the 18th inning when Max Muncy hit a walk-off homer off Nathan Eovaldi, who was in his seventh inning of relief. At 18 innings and 7 hours and 20 minutes this game became the longest World Series game by both innings and time, surpassing (in playing time) Game 3 of the 2005 World Series, which lasted 14 innings and 5 hours and 41 minutes, and breaking the record (in innings) first set by the Red Sox and Dodgers in the 1916 World Series.

In Game 4, the game was scoreless for the first five innings until the Dodgers jumped out to a 4–0 lead thanks to a throwing error and a three-run homer by Yasiel Puig. Rich Hill was dominant, only allowing one hit in 6 1/3 innings while striking out seven. However, he walked one batter in the seventh and that batter scored when Madson appeared in relief and allowed a three-run homer to Mitch Moreland. With that Madson set a new World Series record by allowing all seven runners he inherited in the series to score. The following inning, Steve Pearce tied the game by hitting a solo homer off Jansen, the second blown save in as many nights for Jansen. Then in the ninth, Brock Holt doubled off Dylan Floro and scored on a single by Rafael Devers to put the Red Sox ahead. They proceeded to blow the game open when Pearce hit a three-run double off Kenta Maeda. Kiké Hernández hit a two-run homer off Craig Kimbrel in the ninth, but it was not enough and the Dodgers lost, 9–6. This was the first time they had lost all season when they had a lead of four runs or more. The Red Sox took a commanding three games to one lead in the series.

For the fifth game, Kershaw returned to the mound, only to be greeted by a two-run homer by Steve Pearce in the first inning. He would allow two more solo homers in the sixth and seventh innings. Those accounted for the four runs he allowed, on seven hits with five strikeouts. The Red Sox won the game, 5–1 and clinched the series in five games.

=== Postseason game log ===
2018 Postseason Game Log: (8–8)
National League Division Series (3–1)

#	Date	Opponent	Score	Win	Loss	Save	Attendance	Record
1	October 4	Braves	W 6–0	Ryu (1–0)	Foltynewicz (0–1)	—	50,947	1–0
2	October 5	Braves	W 3–0	Kershaw (1–0)	Sánchez (0–1)	Jansen (1)	54,452	2–0
3	October 7	@ Braves	L 5–6	Toussaint (1–0)	Wood (0–1)	Vizcaíno (1)	42,385	2–1
4	October 8	@ Braves	W 6–2	Madson (1–0)	Venters (0–1)	—	39,586	3–1

National League Championship Series (4–3)

#	Date	Opponent	Score	Win	Loss	Save	Attendance	Record
1	October 12	@ Brewers	L 5–6	Hader (1–0)	Kershaw (0–1)	Knebel (1)	43,615	0–1
2	October 13	@ Brewers	W 4–3	Báez (1–0)	Jeffress (0–1)	Jansen (1)	43,905	1–1
3	October 15	Brewers	L 0–4	Chacín (1–0)	Buehler (0–1)	—	52,793	1–2
4	October 16	Brewers	W 2–1 (13)	Urías (1–0)	Guerra (0–1)	—	53,764	2–2
5	October 17	Brewers	W 5–2	Kershaw (1–1)	Woodruff (0–1)	Jansen (2)	54,502	3–2
6	October 19	@ Brewers	L 2–7	Knebel (1–0)	Ryu (0–1)	—	43,619	3–3
7	October 20	@ Brewers	W 5–1	Madson (1–0)	Chacín (0–1)	—	44,097	4–3

World Series (1–4)

#	Date	Opponent	Score	Win	Loss	Save	Attendance	Record
1	October 23	@ Red Sox	L 4–8	Barnes (1–0)	Kershaw (0–1)	—	38,454	0–1
2	October 24	@ Red Sox	L 2–4	Price (1–0)	Ryu (0–1)	Kimbrel (1)	38,644	0–2
3	October 26	Red Sox	W 3–2 (18)	Wood (1–0)	Eovaldi (0–1)	—	53,114	1–2
4	October 27	Red Sox	L 6–9	Kelly (1–0)	Floro (0–1)	—	54,400	1–3
5	October 28	Red Sox	L 1–5	Price (2–0)	Kershaw (0–2)	—	54,367	1–4

Playoff Rosters
National League Division Series

- Pitchers: 18 Kenta Maeda 21 Walker Buehler 22 Clayton Kershaw 44 Rich Hill 50 Ryan Madson 51 Dylan Floro 52 Pedro Báez 57 Alex Wood 64 Caleb Ferguson 74 Kenley Jansen 75 Scott Alexander 99 Hyun-jin Ryu
- Catchers: 9 Yasmani Grandal 15 Austin Barnes
- Infielders: 3 Chris Taylor 6 Brian Dozier 8 Manny Machado 10 Justin Turner 13 Max Muncy 25 David Freese
- Outfielders: 14 Enrique Hernández 27 Matt Kemp 31 Joc Pederson 35 Cody Bellinger 66 Yasiel Puig

National League Championship Series

- Pitchers: 7 Julio Urías 18 Kenta Maeda 21 Walker Buehler 22 Clayton Kershaw 44 Rich Hill 50 Ryan Madson 51 Dylan Floro 52 Pedro Báez 57 Alex Wood 64 Caleb Ferguson 74 Kenley Jansen 99 Hyun-jin Ryu
- Catchers: 9 Yasmani Grandal 15 Austin Barnes
- Infielders: 3 Chris Taylor 6 Brian Dozier 8 Manny Machado 10 Justin Turner 13 Max Muncy 25 David Freese
- Outfielders: 14 Enrique Hernández 27 Matt Kemp 31 Joc Pederson 35 Cody Bellinger 66 Yasiel Puig

World Series

- Pitchers: 7 Julio Urías 18 Kenta Maeda 21 Walker Buehler 22 Clayton Kershaw 44 Rich Hill 50 Ryan Madson 51 Dylan Floro 52 Pedro Báez 57 Alex Wood 74 Kenley Jansen 75 Scott Alexander 99 Hyun-jin Ryu
- Catchers: 9 Yasmani Grandal 15 Austin Barnes
- Infielders: 3 Chris Taylor 6 Brian Dozier 8 Manny Machado 10 Justin Turner 13 Max Muncy 25 David Freese
- Outfielders: 14 Enrique Hernández 27 Matt Kemp 31 Joc Pederson 35 Cody Bellinger 66 Yasiel Puig

== Roster ==
2018 Los Angeles Dodgers
Roster
Pitchers: 75 Scott Alexander; 88 John Axford; 52 Pedro Báez; 21 Walker Buehler; 47 J. T. Chargois; 54 Tony Cingrani; 56 Daniel Corcino; 64 Caleb Ferguson; 46 Josh Fields; 51 Dylan Floro; 62 Wilmer Font; 63 Yimi García; 62 Erik Goeddel; 44 Rich Hill; 41 Daniel Hudson; 74 Kenley Jansen; 22 Clayton Kershaw; 36 Adam Liberatore; 50 Ryan Madson; 18 Kenta Maeda; 49 Zach Neal; 58 Edward Paredes; 59 Zac Rosscup; 99 Hyun-jin Ryu; 77 Dennis Santana; 48 Brock Stewart; 68 Ross Stripling; 7 Julio Urías; 43 Pat Venditte; 57 Alex Wood	Catchers: 15 Austin Barnes; 58 Rocky Gale; 9 Yasmani Grandal; Infielders: 35 Cody Bellinger; 6 Brian Dozier; 17 Kyle Farmer; 11 Logan Forsythe; 25 David Freese; 8 Manny Machado; 13 Max Muncy; 5 Corey Seager; 3 Chris Taylor; 10 Justin Turner; 26 Chase Utley; 33 Breyvic Valera	Outfielders: 14 Enrique Hernández; 27 Matt Kemp; 70 Tim Locastro; 31 Joc Pederson; 66 Yasiel Puig; 60 Andrew Toles; 61 Alex Verdugo	Manager: 30 Dave Roberts; Coaches: 37 Brant Brown (assistant hitting); 82 Steve Cilladi (bullpen catcher); 8,16 Bob Geren (bench); 40 Rick Honeycutt (pitching); 86 Fumimasa Ishibashi (bullpen catcher); 6 Danny Lehman (game planning and communications); 29 George Lombard (first base); 28 Luis Ortiz (assistant hitting); 23 Mark Prior (bullpen); 12 Turner Ward (hitting); 45 Chris Woodward (third base); 7 Steve Yeager (catching)

== Statistics ==
=== Batting ===
List does not include pitchers. Stats in bold are the team leaders..

Note: G = Games played; AB = At bats; R = Runs; H = Hits; 2B = Doubles; 3B = Triples; HR = Home runs; RBI = Runs batted in; BB = Walks; SO = Strikeouts; SB = Stolen bases; Avg. = Batting average; OBP = On-base percentage; SLG = Slugging; OPS = On Base + Slugging

Player	G	AB	R	H	2B	3B	HR	RBI	BB	SO	SB	AVG	OBP	SLG	OPS
Cody Bellinger	**162**	**557**	84	**145**	28	7	25	76	69	151	14	.260	.343	.470	.814
Chris Taylor	155	536	**85**	136	**35**	**8**	17	63	55	**178**	9	.254	.331	.444	.775
Matt Kemp	146	462	62	134	25	0	21	**85**	36	115	0	**.290**	.338	**.481**	**.818**
Yasmani Grandal	140	440	65	106	23	2	24	68	72	124	2	.241	**.349**	.466	.815
Yasiel Puig	125	405	60	108	21	1	23	63	36	87	**15**	.267	.327	.494	.820
Enrique Hernández	145	402	67	103	17	3	21	52	50	78	3	.256	.336	.470	.806
Max Muncy	137	395	75	104	17	2	**35**	79	**79**	131	3	.263	.391	.582	.973
Joc Pederson	148	395	65	98	27	3	25	56	40	85	1	.248	.321	.522	.843
Justin Turner	103	365	62	114	31	1	14	52	47	54	2	.312	.406	.518	.924
Manny Machado	66	267	36	73	14	2	13	42	25	53	6	.273	.338	.487	.825
Austin Barnes	100	200	32	41	5	0	4	14	31	67	4	.205	.329	.290	.619
Logan Forsythe	70	193	18	40	10	0	2	13	17	43	2	.207	.270	.290	.560
Chase Utley	87	164	18	35	10	1	1	14	17	34	3	.213	.305	.305	.610
Brian Dozier	47	143	16	26	9	0	5	20	24	33	4	.182	.300	.350	.650
Corey Seager	26	101	13	27	5	1	2	13	11	17	0	.267	.348	.396	.744
Alex Verdugo	37	77	11	20	6	0	1	4	8	14	0	.260	.329	.377	.706
Kyle Farmer	39	68	1	16	4	1	0	9	5	15	0	.235	.312	.324	.635
David Freese	19	39	9	15	2	1	2	9	6	16	0	.385	.489	.641	1.130
Andrew Toles	17	30	5	7	2	0	0	4	2	8	1	.233	.281	.300	.581
Breyvic Valera	20	29	4	5	0	0	0	4	4	4	0	.172	.273	.172	.445
Tim Locastro	18	11	6	2	1	0	0	0	2	5	4	.182	.357	.273	.630
Rocky Gale	3	2	0	0	0	0	0	0	0	1	0	.000	.000	.000	.000
Non-Pitcher Totals	163	5281	794	1355	292	33	235	740	636	1313	73	.257	.341	.458	.799
**Team totals**	**163**	**5572**	**804**	**1394**	**296**	**33**	**235**	**756**	**647**	**1436**	**75**	**.250**	**.333**	**.442**	**.774**

=== Pitching ===
Stats in bold are the team leaders.

Note: W = Wins; L = Losses; ERA = Earned run average; G = Games pitched; GS = Games started; SV = Saves; IP = Innings pitched; R = Runs allowed; ER = Earned runs allowed; BB = Walks allowed; K = Strikeouts

Player	W	L	ERA	G	GS	SV	IP	H	R	ER	BB	K
Clayton Kershaw	9	5	2.73	26	26	0	**161.1**	139	55	49	29	**155**
Alex Wood	9	7	3.68	33	**27**	0	151.2	**143**	**70**	**62**	40	135
Rich Hill	**11**	5	3.66	25	24	0	132.2	108	57	54	41	150
Walker Buehler	8	5	2.62	24	23	0	137.1	95	43	40	37	151
Kenta Maeda	8	**10**	3.83	38	20	2	124.2	115	58	53	**43**	152
Ross Stripling	8	6	3.02	33	21	0	122.0	123	42	41	22	136
Hyun-jin Ryu	7	3	1.97	15	15	0	82.1	68	23	18	15	89
Kenley Jansen	1	5	2.80	68	0	**38**	70.2	52	26	22	17	80
Scott Alexander	2	1	3.68	**72**	1	3	66.0	56	28	27	27	56
Pedro Báez	4	3	2.91	54	0	0	55.2	46	19	18	22	62
Caleb Ferguson	7	2	3.49	29	3	2	49.0	43	21	19	12	59
Daniel Hudson	3	2	4.11	40	1	0	46.0	38	25	21	18	44
Josh Fields	2	2	2.20	45	0	2	41.0	28	10	10	11	33
J. T. Chargois	2	4	3.34	39	0	0	32.1	26	13	12	15	40
Eric Goeddel	1	0	3.38	26	0	0	29.1	22	11	11	15	35
Dylan Floro	3	1	1.63	29	0	0	27.2	18	5	5	11	31
Tony Cingrani	1	2	4.76	30	0	0	22.2	19	12	12	6	36
Yimi García	1	2	5.64	25	0	0	22.1	29	18	14	4	19
Brock Stewart	0	1	6.11	9	2	0	17.2	23	15	12	9	14
Pat Venditte	0	0	2.57	15	0	0	14.0	11	4	4	3	9
Adam Liberatore	2	1	2.77	17	0	0	13.0	10	4	4	8	12
Zac Rosscup	0	1	4.76	17	0	0	11.1	9	6	6	4	20
Wilmer Font	0	2	11.32	6	0	0	10.1	18	13	13	1	7
Ryan Madson	0	0	6.48	9	0	0	8.1	10	6	6	1	13
Edward Paredes	2	0	5.87	15	0	0	7.2	7	5	5	2	8
Daniel Corcino	0	0	2.25	2	0	1	4.0	2	2	1	3	1
Julio Urías	0	0	0.00	3	0	0	4.0	1	0	0	0	7
John Axford	0	0	17.18	5	0	0	3.2	8	8	7	2	4
Dennis Santana	1	0	12.27	1	0	0	3.2	6	5	5	1	4
Zach Neal	0	0	9.00	1	0	0	1.0	2	1	1	0	0
**Team totals**	**92**	**71**	**3.38**	**163**	**163**	**48**	**1476.0**	**1279**	**610**	**554**	**422**	**1565**

== Awards and honors ==
Recipient	Award	Date awarded	Ref.
Matt Kemp	National League Player of the Week (May 28–June 3)	June 4, 2018	
Kenley Jansen	National League All-Star Team	July 8, 2018	
Matt Kemp	National League All-Star Team	July 8, 2018	
Ross Stripling	National League All-Star Team	July 11, 2018	
Justin Turner	National League Player of the Month (August)	September 4, 2018	
Yasiel Puig	National League Player of the Week (Sep 10–16)	September 17, 2018	
Chase Utley	Roy Campanella Award	September 19, 2018	
Walker Buehler	Baseball America All-Rookie Team	October 4, 2018	
Matt Kemp	Sporting News NL Comeback Player of the Year Award	October 16, 2018	
Cody Bellinger	National League Championship Series Most Valuable Player Award	October 20, 2018	
Matt Kemp	Players Choice NL Comeback Player of the Year Award	November 27, 2018	

== Transactions ==
=== March ===
- On March 29, placed 3B Justin Turner (broken wrist), RHP Tom Koehler (right anterior capsule strain) and RHP Yimi García (recovering from Tommy John surgery) on the 10-day disabled list. RHP Cory Mazzoni claimed off waivers by the Chicago Cubs.

=== April ===
- On April 1, acquired IF Breyvic Valera from the St. Louis Cardinals in exchange for minor league OF Johan Mieses and optioned him to AAA Oklahoma City.
- On April 2, acquired RHP Jesús Liranzo from the Baltimore Orioles in exchange for minor league LHP Luis Ysla and optioned him to Double-A Tulsa. Transferred RHP Tom Koehler from the 10-day disabled list to the 60-day disabled list.
- On April 3, placed RHP Josh Fields on the paternity list, designated RHP Jesús Liranzo for assignment and purchased the contract of RHP Zach Neal from AAA Oklahoma City.
- On April 5, claimed RHP Alec Asher off waivers from the Baltimore Orioles and designated RHP Zach Neal for assignment. Asher was assigned to Triple-A Oklahoma City.
- On April 7, activated RHP Josh Fields off the paternity list.
- On April 12, outrighted RHP Dylan Baker to AA Tulsa.
- On April 15, placed IF Logan Forsythe on the 10-day disabled list with right shoulder inflammation and recalled IF Breyvic Valera from AAA Oklahoma City.
- On April 17, RHP Alec Asher was claimed off waivers by the Milwaukee Brewers. Acquired RHP Ariel Hernández from the Cincinnati Reds in exchange for minor leaguers Zach Neal and Ibandel Isabel and optioned him to AA Tulsa. Optioned IF Breyvic Valera to AAA Oklahoma City and purchased the contract of IF Max Muncy from AAA Oklahoma City.
- On April 18, placed LHP Rich Hill on the 10-day disabled list with a cracked nail on his left middle finger and recalled LHP Adam Liberatore from AAA Oklahoma City.
- On April 23, recalled RHP Walker Buehler from AAA Oklahoma City and designated RHP Wilmer Font for assignment.
- On April 24, optioned RHP Walker Buehler to Class-A Rancho Cucamonga and purchased the contract of RHP Daniel Hudson from AAA Oklahoma City.
- On April 25, activated RHP Yimi García from the 10-day disabled list and optioned him to AAA Oklahoma City.
- On April 28, recalled RHP Walker Buehler from Class-A Rancho Cucamonga. Recalled OF Alex Verdugo from AAA Oklahoma City and optioned LHP Scott Alexander to AAA Oklahoma City.
- On April 29, optioned RHP Walker Buehler to Class-A Rancho Cucamonga, placed OF Yasiel Puig on the 10-day disabled list with a left hip contusion and recalled RHP Brock Stewart from AAA Oklahoma City.
- On April 30, placed SS Corey Seager on the 10-day disabled list with a sprain of the ulnar collateral ligament in his right elbow and recalled IF Breyvic Valera from AAA Oklahoma City.

=== May ===
- On May 1, optioned RHP Brock Stewart to AAA Oklahoma City and recalled LHP Edward Paredes from AAA Oklahoma City.
- On May 3, placed LHP Hyun-jin Ryu on the 10-day disabled list with a left groin strain, optioned IF Breyvic Valera to AAA Oklahoma City and recalled RHP Yimi García and IF/OF Tim Locastro from AAA Oklahoma City.
- On May 4, optioned LHP Edward Paredes to AAA Oklahoma City and recalled RHP Walker Buehler from High-A Rancho Cucamonga and IF Breyvic Valera from AAA Oklahoma City.
- On May 6, placed LHP Clayton Kershaw on the 10-day disabled list with left biceps tendonitis and recalled RHP Brock Stewart from AAA Oklahoma City.
- On May 7, optioned IF Breyvic Valera to AAA Oklahoma City.
- On May 8, activated LHP Rich Hill from the 10-day disabled list and optioned RHP Brock Stewart to AAA Oklahoma City.
- On May 9, activated OF Yasiel Puig from the 10-day disabled list, placed LHP Tony Cingrani on the 10-day disabled list with left shoulder inflammation, recalled RHP Brock Stewart and LHP Scott Alexander from AAA Oklahoma City and optioned RHP Yimi García and OF Alex Verdugo to AAA Oklahoma City.
- On May 12, optioned RHP Brock Stewart to AAA Oklahoma City, transferred SS Corey Seager from the 10-day disabled list to the 60-day disabled list and purchased the contract of switch pitcher Pat Venditte from AAA Oklahoma City.
- On May 15, activated IF Logan Forsythe and 3B Justin Turner from the 10-day disabled list and optioned C/3B Kyle Farmer and IF/OF Tim Locastro to AAA Oklahoma City.
- On May 18, claimed RHP Erik Goeddel off waivers from the Seattle Mariners and designated LHP Henry Owens for assignment.
- On May 19, activated LHP Tony Cingrani from the 10-day disabled list and optioned LHP Adam Liberatore to AAA Oklahoma City. Recalled RHP Yimi García from AAA Oklahoma City, activated RHP Erik Goeddel and optioned switch pitcher Pat Venditte to AAA Oklahoma City.
- On May 20, optioned RHP Yimi García to AAA Oklahoma City, recalled switch pitcher Pat Venditte from AAA Oklahoma City and placed LHP Rich Hill on the 10-day disabled list with a blister on the middle finger of his left hand.
- On May 23, recalled LHP Edward Paredes from AAA Oklahoma City and optioned RHP J. T. Chargois to AAA Oklahoma City.
- On May 28, optioned LHP Edward Paredes to AAA Oklahoma City and recalled RHP Yimi García from AAA Oklahoma City.
- On May 29, optioned RHP Brock Stewart to AAA Oklahoma City and recalled IF Breyvic Valera from AAA Oklahoma City.
- On May 30, placed RHP Kenta Maeda on the 10-day disabled list with a strained right hip and recalled RHP Dennis Santana from AAA Oklahoma City. Placed 2B Chase Utley on the 10-day disabled list with a left thumb sprain and recalled switch pitcher Pat Venditte from AAA Oklahoma City.
- On May 31, activated LHP Clayton Kershaw from the 10-day disabled list and optioned switch pitcher Pat Venditte to AAA Oklahoma City.

=== June ===
- On June 1, placed LHP Clayton Kershaw on the 10-day disabled list with lower back strain and recalled RHP Brock Stewart from AAA Oklahoma City.
- On June 2, claimed LHP P. J. Conlon off waivers from the New York Mets, optioned him to AAA Oklahoma City, and transferred LHP Hyun-jin Ryu from the 10-day disabled list to the 60-day disabled list.
- On June 6, optioned RHP Pedro Báez to AAA Oklahoma City, purchased the contract of LHP Caleb Ferguson from AAA Oklahoma City and LHP P. J. Conlon was claimed off waivers by the New York Mets.
- On June 7, placed LHP Tony Cingrani on the 10-day disabled list with a left shoulder strain, optioned LHP Caleb Ferguson to AAA Oklahoma City and recalled RHP Pedro Báez and LHP Edward Paredes from AAA Oklahoma City.
- On June 8, placed RHP Dennis Santana on the 10-day disabled list with a right rotator cuff strain, optioned RHP Brock Stewart to AAA Oklahoma City and recalled LHP Adam Liberatore and switch pitcher Pat Venditte from AAA Oklahoma City.
- On June 9, optioned switch pitcher Pat Venditte to AAA Oklahoma City, transferred RHP Dennis Santana from the 10-day disabled list to the 60-day disabled list and purchased the contract of RHP Daniel Corcino from AAA Oklahoma City.
- On June 12, placed RHP Walker Buehler on the 10-day disabled list with a rib microfracture and recalled RHP Caleb Ferguson from AAA Oklahoma City.
- On June 13, activated RHP Kenta Maeda from the 10-day disabled list and optioned RHP Daniel Corcino to AAA Oklahoma City.
- On June 15, placed RHP Pedro Báez on the 10-day disabled list with right biceps tendonitis and recalled C/IF Kyle Farmer from AAA Oklahoma City.
- On June 19, activated LHP Rich Hill from the 10-day disabled list, recalled RHP Brock Stewart from AAA Oklahoma City and optioned IF Breyvic Valera to AAA Oklahoma City.
- On June 20, optioned RHP Brock Stewart and C/IF Kyle Farmer to AAA Oklahoma City.
- On June 22, activated IF Chase Utley from the 10-day disabled list.
- On June 23, activated LHP Clayton Kershaw from the 10-day disabled list and optioned LHP Adam Liberatore to AAA Oklahoma City.
- On June 28, activated RHP Walker Buehler from the 10-day disabled list and placed RHP Josh Fields on the 10-day disabled list with right shoulder inflammation.
- On June 29, optioned RHP Walker Buehler to Advanced Class-A Rancho Cucamonga.
- On June 30, recalled RHP J. T. Chargois from AAA Oklahoma City.

=== July ===
- On July 4, acquired RHP Dylan Floro, minor league RHP Zach Neal and international bonus pool space from the Cincinnati Reds in exchange for minor league pitchers James Marinan and Aneurys Zabala. Designated RHP Daniel Corcino for assignment.
- On July 7, activated RHP Dylan Floro, recalled switch pitcher Pat Venditte from AAA Oklahoma City, placed RHP Yimi García on the 10-day disabled list with right forearm inflammation and placed RHP Kenta Maeda on the paternity list.
- On July 9, placed OF Yasiel Puig on the 10-day disabled list with a right oblique strain and recalled OF Andrew Toles from AAA Oklahoma City.
- On July 10, activated RHP Kenta Maeda from the paternity list and optioned LHP Edward Paredes to AAA Oklahoma City.
- On July 11, claimed LHP Zac Rosscup off waivers from the Colorado Rockies and designated LHP Edward Paredes for assignment.
- On July 13, activated RHP Walker Buehler from the 10-day disabled list and optioned switch pitcher Pat Venditte to AAA Oklahoma City.
- On July 14, activated LHP Zac Rosscup and optioned RHP Walker Buehler to AAA Oklahoma City.
- On July 18, acquired SS/3B Manny Machado from the Baltimore Orioles in exchange for IF Breyvic Valera and minor league players Dean Kremer, Yusniel Diaz, Zach Pop and Rylan Bannon.
- On July 20, activated SS/3B Manny Machado and optioned OF Andrew Toles to AAA Oklahoma City.
- On July 23, placed 3B Justin Turner on the 10-day disabled list with a right groin strain and recalled OF Alex Verdugo from AAA Oklahoma City.
- On July 25, placed LHP Zac Rosscup on the 10-day disabled list with middle finger inflammation, activated RHP Pedro Báez from the 10-day disabled list, recalled RHP Walker Buehler from AAA Oklahoma City and optioned RHP Dylan Floro to AAA Oklahoma City.
- On July 28, activated OF Yasiel Puig from the 10-day disabled list and optioned OF Alex Verdugo to AAA Oklahoma City.
- On July 30, placed RHP Ross Stripling on the 10-day disabled list with right toe inflammation and recalled RHP Dylan Floro from AAA Oklahoma City.
- On July 31, acquired 2B Brian Dozier from the Minnesota Twins in exchange for 2B Logan Forsythe and minor leaguers Devin Smeltzer and Luke Raley. Acquired RHP John Axford from the Toronto Blue Jays in exchange for minor leaguer Corey Copping. Designated RHP Ariel Hernández for assignment.

=== August ===
- On August 2, activated 3B Justin Turner from the 10-day disabled list and placed IF Chase Utley on the 10-day disabled list with left wrist inflammation.
- On August 3, activated RHP John Axford and placed RHP Erik Goeddel on the 10-day disabled list with right lat inflammation.
- On August 7, placed RHP Daniel Hudson on the 10-day disabled list with right forearm tightness and recalled switch pitcher Pat Venditte from AAA Oklahoma City.
- On August 9, activated RHP Ross Stripling from the 10-day disabled list and optioned switch pitcher Pat Venditte to AAA Oklahoma City.
- On August 10, placed RHP Kenley Jansen on the 10-day disabled with an irregular heartbeat and recalled switch pitcher Pat Venditte from AAA Oklahoma City.
- On August 13, activated RHP Erik Goeddel from the 10-day disabled list and optioned switch pitcher Pat Venditte to AAA Oklahoma City.
- On August 14, activated LHP Alex Wood from the 10-day disabled list and placed RHP John Axford on the 10-day disabled list with a fractured right fibula.
- On August 15, activated LHP Hyun-jin Ryu from the 60-day disabled list, transferred LHP Tony Cingrani from the 10-day disabled list to the 60-day disabled list and placed RHP Ross Stripling on the 10-day disabled list with lower back inflammation.
- On August 17, activated RHP Daniel Hudson from the 10-day disabled list and placed RHP Erik Goeddel on the 10-day disabled list with right elbow inflammation.
- On August 20, activated RHP Kenley Jansen from the 10-day disabled list and placed LHP Zac Rosscup on the 10-day disabled list with a left calf strain.
- On August 21, placed RHP J. T. Chargois on the 10-day disabled list with a neck injury and recalled switch pitcher Pat Venditte from AAA Oklahoma City.
- On August 24, placed RHP Daniel Hudson on the 10-day disabled list with right forearm tightness and activated RHP Yimi García from the 10-day disabled list.
- On August 25, transferred RHP Josh Fields from the 10-day disabled list to the 60-day disabled list and activated LHP Julio Urías from the 60-day disabled list and optioned him to Class-A Advanced Rancho Cucamonga.
- On August 30, activated RHP Josh Fields from the 60-day disabled list, optioned RHP Yimi García to Advanced Class-A Rancho Cucamonga and designated IF/OF Rob Segedin for assignment.
- On August 31, acquired RHP Ryan Madson from the Washington Nationals in exchange for minor league pitcher Andrew Istler and 3B/1B David Freese from the Pittsburgh Pirates in exchange for minor league infielder Jesus Manuel Valdez. Designated LHP Adam Liberatore for assignment and transferred RHP Erik Goeddel from the 10-day disabled list to the 60-day disabled list.

=== September ===
- On September 1, activated RHP Ryan Madson and 3B/1B David Freese, activated IF Chase Utley and LHP Zac Rosscup from the 10-day disabled list and recalled C/3B Kyle Farmer, IF/OF Tim Locastro and OFs Alex Verdugo and Andrew Toles from AAA Oklahoma City.
- On September 2, recalled RHP Brock Stewart from AAA Oklahoma City and placed him on the 60-day disabled list with a right oblique strain. Purchased the contract of C Rocky Gale from AAA Oklahoma City.
- On September 7, activated RHP Ross Stripling from the 10-day disabled list.
- On September 10, recalled LHP Julio Urías from AAA Oklahoma City.
- On September 17, activated RHP John Axford from the 10-day disabled list, activated LHP Tony Cingrani from the 60-day disabled list, recalled RHP Yimi García from Advanced Class-A Rancho Cucamonga and transferred RHP Daniel Hudson from the 10-day disabled list to the 60-day disabled list.
- On September 24, activated RHP J. T. Chargois from the 10-day disabled list.

== Farm system ==
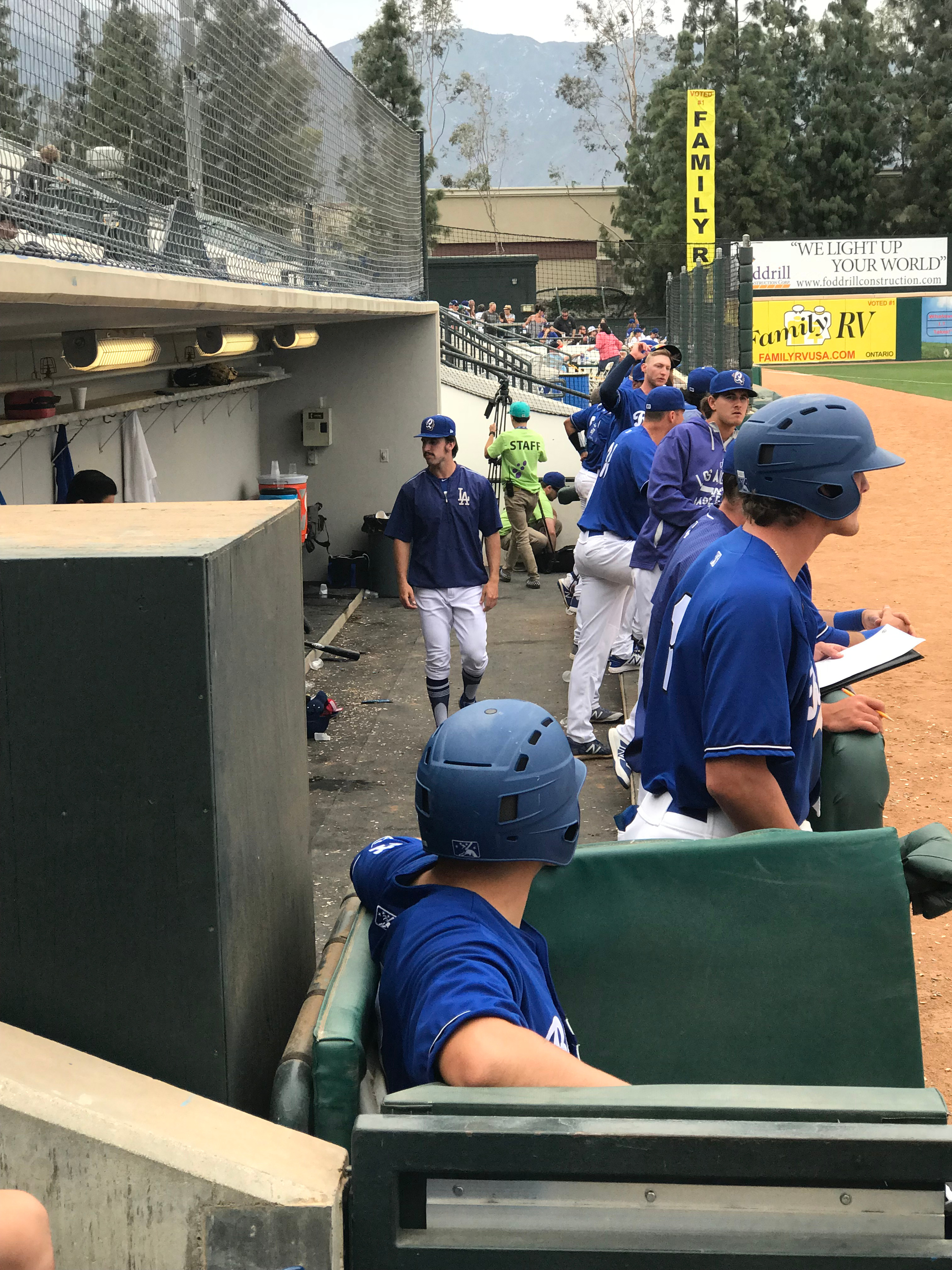
The Rancho Cucamonga Quakes won the California League championship.

Level	Team	League	Manager	W	L	Position
AAA	Oklahoma City Dodgers	Pacific Coast League	Bill Haselman	75	65	1st place Lost in playoffs
AA	Tulsa Drillers	Texas League	Scott Hennessey	74	65	1st place League Champions
High A	Rancho Cucamonga Quakes	California League	Drew Saylor	87	53	1st Place; League Champions
A	Great Lakes Loons	Midwest League	John Shoemaker	60	77	6th Place; Lost in playoffs
Rookie	Ogden Raptors	Pioneer League	Jeremy Rodriguez	46	30	1st place Lost in playoffs
Rookie	Arizona League Dodgers	Arizona League	Mark Kertenian	37	18	1st place Won League Championship
Rookie	DSL Dodgers Guerrero	Dominican Summer League	Austin Chubb	34	36	4th place
Rookie	DSL Dodgers Robinson	Dominican Summer League	Keyter Collado	39	30	3rd place

=== Mid-Season All-Stars ===
- All-Star Futures Game

Catcher Keibert Ruiz
Outfielder Yusniel Díaz

- Pacific Coast League All-Stars

Pitcher Manny Banuelos
Pitcher Pat Venditte
Catcher Rocky Gale
Outfielder Alex Verdugo

- Texas League All-Stars

Pitcher Yadier Álvarez
Pitcher Justin De Fratus
Catcher Keibert Ruiz
Infielder Drew Jackson
Infielder Connor Joe

- California League All-Stars

Pitcher Dean Kremer
Pitcher Tony Gonsolin
Catcher Connor Wong
Shortstop Gavin Lux
Third baseman Rylan Bannon
Outfielder Logan Landon

- Midwest League All-Stars

Pitcher Andre Scrubb
Infielder Jared Walker

- Pioneer League All-Stars

Pitcher Jose Chacin
Shortstop Ronny Brito
Shortstop Jacob Amaya
Outfielder Daniel Robinson

- Dominican Summer League All-Stars

Pitcher Carlos Duran
Pitcher Carlos Montilla
Pitcher Jose Rodulfo
Outfielder Andy Pages

=== Post-Season All-Stars ===
- Pacific Coast League All-Stars

Pitcher Manny Banuelos
Outfielder Alex Verdugo

- Texas League All-Stars

Outfielder Jacob Scavuzzo

- California League All-Stars

Pitcher Dustin May
Shortstop Gavin Lux
Infielder Rylan Bannon (also Rookie of the Year and Most Valuable Player)
Outfielder Cody Thomas

- Pioneer League All-Stars

Pitcher Jose Chacin
Shortstop Ronny Brito

- Baseball America High Class A All-Stars

Shortstop Gavin Lux (Player of the Year)

- Arizona Fall League Fall Stars Game

Pitcher Jordan Sheffield
Catcher Keibert Ruiz

=== Notes ===
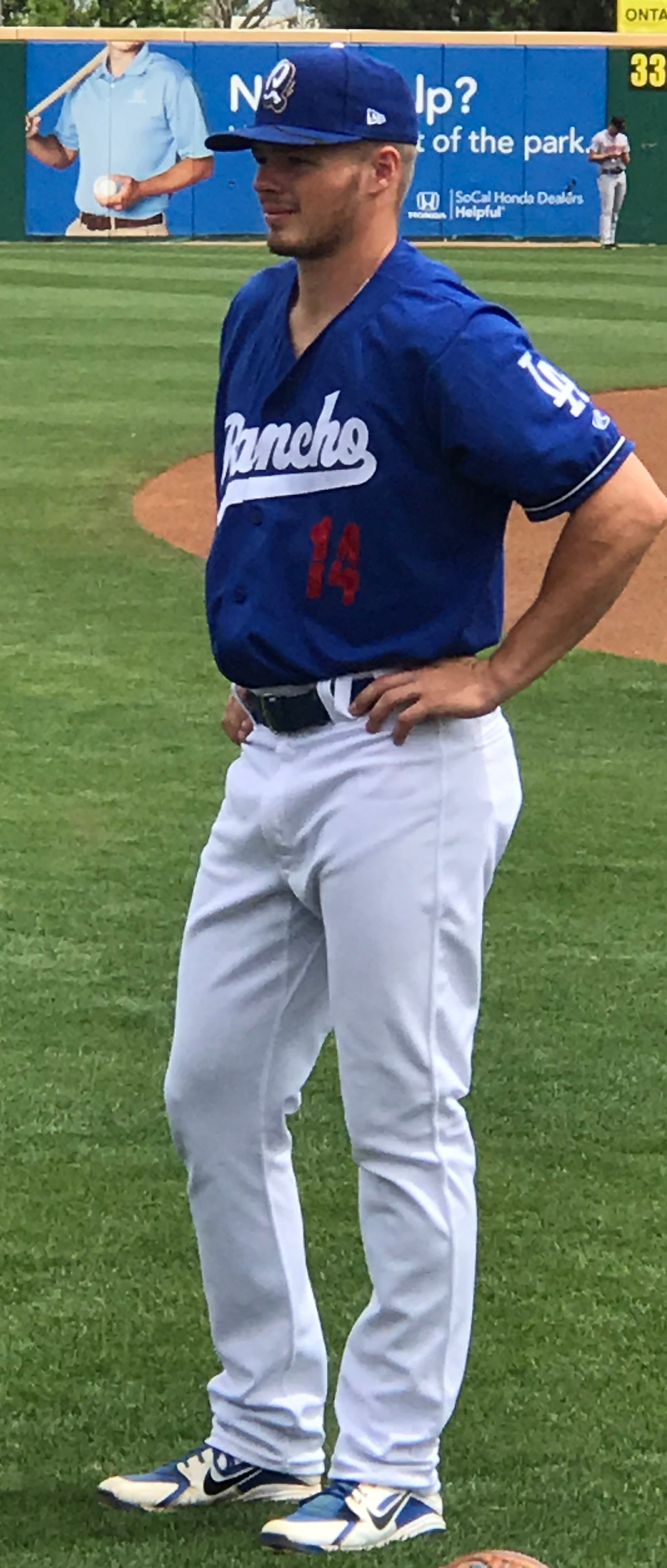
Gavin Lux was the Dodgers 2018 Minor League Player of the Year.

- The Dodgers named Gavin Lux and Tony Gonsolin as the organizations Minor League Player and Pitcher of the Year.
- The Oklahoma City Dodgers won two straight double headers from the Colorado Springs Sky Sox on the last two days of the regular season to move past them to win the Pacific Coast League American North Division Title and a spot in the playoffs. However, they lost their opening playoff series, three games to one, to the Memphis Redbirds.
- On August 31, the Tulsa Drillers clinched a playoff berth and a spot in the Texas League playoffs with an 8–1 win over the Northwest Arkansas Naturals. They then beat the Arkansas Travelers in five games in the North Division Championship Series. The Drillers won the Texas League championship with a three-game series sweep of the San Antonio Missions.
- On June 17, the Rancho Cucamonga Quakes clinched a first half division title and a spot in the California League playoffs with a 10–4 win over the Inland Empire 66ers. The Quakes defeated the Lancaster JetHawks, three games to one, in the semi-finals and advanced to the California League championship series. The Quakes won the championship with a three-game series sweep of the Visalia Rawhide.
- On August 30, the Great Lakes Loons clinched a spot in the Midwest League playoffs. However, they were swept in their first round playoff series by the West Michigan Whitecaps.
- On July 19, the Ogden Raptors clinched the first-half Pioneer League South Division championship and a playoff spot. They were eliminated in three games in the first round of the playoffs by the Grand Junction Rockies.
- The Arizona League Dodgers won the league championship over the Arizona League Cubs 1 two games to one.

== Major League Baseball draft ==
The Dodgers selected 40 players in this draft. In the first round, they selected pitcher J. T. Ginn from Brandon High School in Brandon, Mississippi. Ginn did not sign and chose to attend college instead. As of the 2026 season, nine players from this draft have played in the majors.

2018 draft picks

Round	Name	Position	School	Signed	Career span	Highest level
1	J. T. Ginn	RHP	Brandon High School	No; Mets–2020	2021–present	MLB
2	Michael Grove	RHP	West Virginia University	Yes	2019–present	MLB
3	John Rooney	LHP	Hofstra University	Yes	2018–present	MLB
4	Braydon Fisher	RHP	Clear Falls High School	Yes	2018–present	MLB
5	Devin Mann	2B/SS	University of Louisville	Yes	2018–2025	AAA
6	Bryan Warzek	LHP	University of New Orleans	Yes	2018–2025	AA
7	James Outman	OF	Sacramento State	Yes	2018–present	MLB
8	Luke Heyer	2B	University of Kentucky	Yes	2018–2021	A+
9	Josh McLain	CF	North Carolina State	Yes	2018–2019	A
10	Deacon Liput	2B	University of Florida	Yes	2018–2021	AAA
11	Stephen Kolek	RHP	Texas A&M University	Yes	2018–present	MLB
12	Hunter Feduccia	C	Louisiana State University	Yes	2018–present	MLB
13	Dillon Paulson	1B	USC	Yes	2018–2023	AA
14	Brandon White	RHP	W. F. West High School	No; Marlins–2021	2023–present	AAA
15	Julian Smith	LHP	Catawba Valley Community College	Yes	2019–2024	A+
16	Trey Dillard	RHP	San Jacinto College North	No	2023–present	AA
17	Aldrich De Jongh	OF	Hillsborough Community College	Yes	2018–2023	AAA
18	Niko Hulsizer	OF	Morehead State University	Yes	2018–2024	AAA
19	Sam McWilliams	OF	Meridian Community College	Yes	2018–2021	AA
20	Caleb Sampen	RHP	Wright State University	Yes	2018–2022	AA
21	Tre Todd	C	Liberty University	Yes	2018–2019	A+
22	Meaux Landry	1B	Pearl River Community College	Yes	2018–2019	Rookie
23	Justin Hagenman	RHP	Penn State University	Yes	2018–present	MLB
24	Jacen Roberson	CF	Garces Memorial High School	No; Diamondbacks – 2021	2021–2023	A+
25	Hunter Speer	RHP	William Carey University	Yes	2018–2022	AA
26	Aaron Ackerman	C	University of Illinois at Chicago	Yes	2018–2019	Rookie
27	Connor Mitchell	LHP	Butler University	Yes	2018–2019	A+
28	Reza Aleaziz	RHP	Oklahoma State University	Yes	2018–2025	A+
29	Dan Robinson	OF	Central Michigan University	Yes	2018–2023	A
30	Matt Cogen	OF	Belmont University	Yes	2018–2019	A
31	Andrew Shaps	LHP	William Jessup University	Yes	2018–2023	A+
32	Jacob Gilliland	RHP	Next Level Academy	Yes	2018–2023	Rookie
33	Drew Avans	CF	Southeastern Louisiana University	Yes	2018–present	MLB
34	Austin Drury	LHP	University of North Florida	Yes	2018–2025	AA
35	Tyler Reichenborn	OF	Iowa Western Community College	No	2019–2023	A+
36	Jeremiah Vision	CF	Golden West College	Yes	2018–2019	Rookie
37	Jon Littell	OF	Oklahoma State University	Yes	2018–2019	Rookie
38	Connery Peters	RHP	Joshua High School	No	2023–2025	A+
39	Jordan Myrow	OF	San Jacinto College North	No	2022–2023	Ind
40	Ben Specht	LHP	Evangelical Christian School	No		
