= 2018 San Francisco Giants season =

2018 San Francisco Giants
- League: National League
- Division: West
- Ballpark: AT&T Park
- City: San Francisco, California
- Record: 73–89 (.451)
- Divisional place: 4th
- Owners: Larry Baer (managing general partner)
- Managers: Bruce Bochy
- Television: KNTV (NBC Bay Area 11) (Jon Miller, Mike Krukow, Duane Kuiper, Amy Gutierrez); NBC Sports Bay Area (Duane Kuiper, Mike Krukow, Dave Flemming, Jon Miller, Jeremy Affeldt, Javier López, Amy Gutierrez)
- Radio: KNBR (680 AM); San Francisco Giants Radio Network (Jon Miller, Dave Flemming, Duane Kuiper, Mike Krukow); KXZM (93.7 FM, Spanish) (Erwin Higueros, Tito Fuentes, Marvin Benard)
- Stats: ESPN.com; Baseball Reference

The 2018 San Francisco Giants season was the Giants' 136th year in Major League Baseball, their 60th year in San Francisco since their move from New York following the 1957 season, and their 19th at AT&T Park.

== Events ==
=== Offseason ===
- December 15, 2017 − The Giants traded LHP Matt Moore and international signing bonus pool money to Texas Rangers for minor league RHP Sam Wolff and minor league RHP Israel Cruz.
- December 19, 2017 − The Giants re-signed C Nick Hundley to a one-year deal.
- December 20, 2017 − The Giants traded 3B Christian Arroyo, CF Denard Span, minor league LHP Matt Krook, and minor league RHP Stephen Woods to Tampa Bay Rays for 3B Evan Longoria and cash considerations.
- January 12, 2018 − The Giants avoided arbitration with 2B Joe Panik, RHP Hunter Strickland, RHP Sam Dyson, RHP Cory Gearrin and LHP Will Smith agreeing to one-year deals.
- January 15, 2018 − The Giants traded RHP Kyle Crick, minor league OF Bryan Reynolds, and international signing bonus pool money to Pittsburgh Pirates for OF Andrew McCutchen and cash considerations.
- January 15, 2018 − The Giants signed OF Austin Jackson to a two-year contract.
- February 19, 2018 − The Giants signed LHP Tony Watson to a two-year contract with a player option for a third year.

=== Regular season ===
- April 22, 2018 − Brandon Belt set a new MLB record for most pitches seen in a single at bat, with 21 against the Angels' starting pitcher, Jaime Barria. Belt fouled off 16 two-strike pitches against the right-hander in his first plate appearance of the game, in the top of the first inning.
- July 8, 2018 – The Giants acquire a player to be named later or cash considerations in a trade with the Texas Rangers in exchange for OF Austin Jackson, RHP Cory Gearrin and minor league RHP Jason Bahr.
- July 8, 2018 – The rosters for the 2018 Major League Baseball All-Star Game are announced, with SS Brandon Crawford being named the National League's starter at shortstop and to the All-Star game for the second time. C Buster Posey make the All-Star game for the sixth time.
- August 31, 2018 – The Giants acquire minor league RHP Juan De Paula and INF Abiatal Avelino from the New York Yankees in exchange for OF Andrew McCutchen.

== Season standings ==
=== National League West ===
NL West
Team	W	L	Pct.	GB	Home	Road
Los Angeles Dodgers	92	71	.564	—	45‍–‍37	47‍–‍34
Colorado Rockies	91	72	.558	1	47‍–‍34	44‍–‍38
Arizona Diamondbacks	82	80	.506	9½	40‍–‍41	42‍–‍39
San Francisco Giants	73	89	.451	18½	42‍–‍39	31‍–‍50
San Diego Padres	66	96	.407	25½	31‍–‍50	35‍–‍46

=== National League Division Standings ===
Division leaders
Team	W	L	Pct.
Milwaukee Brewers	96	67	.589
Los Angeles Dodgers	92	71	.564
Atlanta Braves	90	72	.556

Wild Card teams (Top 2 teams qualify for postseason)
Team	W	L	Pct.	GB
Chicago Cubs	95	68	.583	+4
Colorado Rockies	91	72	.558	—
St. Louis Cardinals	88	74	.543	2½
Pittsburgh Pirates	82	79	.509	8
Arizona Diamondbacks	82	80	.506	8½
Washington Nationals	82	80	.506	8½
Philadelphia Phillies	80	82	.494	10½
New York Mets	77	85	.475	13½
San Francisco Giants	73	89	.451	17½
Cincinnati Reds	67	95	.414	23½
San Diego Padres	66	96	.407	24½
Miami Marlins	63	98	.391	27

=== Record vs. opponents ===
2018 National League record Source: MLB Standings Grid – 2018
Team	AZ	ATL	CHC	CIN	COL	LAD	MIA	MIL	NYM	PHI	PIT	SD	SF	STL	WSH	AL
Arizona	—	3–4	3–4	3–3	8–11	11–8	6–1	1–5	2–5	4–2	6–1	12–7	8–11	3–3	2–5	10–10
Atlanta	4–3	—	3–3	3–4	2–5	2–5	14–5	3–4	13–6	12–7	5–1	4–3	3–3	4–2	10–9	8–12
Chicago	4–3	3–3	—	11–8	3–3	4–3	5–2	11–9	6–1	4–2	10–9	5–2	3–3	9–10	4–3	13–7
Cincinnati	3–3	4–3	8–11	—	2–4	6–1	2–5	6–13	3–3	3–4	5–14	3–4	4–2	7–12	1–6	10–10
Colorado	11–8	5–2	3–3	4–2	—	7–13	2–4	2–5	6–1	5–2	3–3	11–8	12–7	2–5	5–2	13–7
Los Angeles	8–11	5–2	3–4	1–6	13–7	—	2–4	4–3	4–2	3–4	5–1	14–5	10–9	3–4	5–1	12–8
Miami	1–6	5–14	2–5	5–2	4–2	4–2	—	2–5	7–12	8–11	1–4	2–5	4–3	3–3	6–13	9–11
Milwaukee	5–1	4–3	9–11	13–6	5–2	3–4	5–2	—	4–3	3–3	7–12	4–2	6–1	11–8	4–2	13–7
New York	5–2	6–13	1–6	3–3	1–6	2–4	12–7	3–4	—	11–8	3–4	4–2	4–3	3–3	11–8	8–12
Philadelphia	2–4	7–12	2–4	4–3	2–5	4–3	11–8	3–3	8–11	—	6–1	3–3	4–3	4–3	8–11	12–8
Pittsburgh	1–6	1–5	9–10	14–5	3–3	1–5	4–1	12–7	4–3	1–6	—	3–4	4–3	8–11	2–5	15–5
San Diego	7–12	3–4	2–5	4–3	8–11	5–14	5–2	2–4	2–4	3–3	4–3	—	8–11	4–3	2–4	7–13
San Francisco	11–8	3–3	3–3	2–4	7–12	9–10	3–4	1–6	3–4	3–4	3–4	11–8	—	2–5	4–2	8–12
St. Louis	3–3	2–4	10–9	12–7	5–2	4–3	3–3	8–11	3–3	3–4	11–8	3–4	5–2	—	5–2	11–9
Washington	5–2	9–10	3–4	6–1	2–5	1–5	13–6	2–4	8–11	11–8	5–2	4–2	2–4	2–5	—	9–11

The October 1 tiebreaker games were regular-season games that are included here.

== Game log and schedule ==
Legend
	Giants win
	Giants loss
	Postponement
**Bold**	Giants team member

2018 Game Log: 73–89 (Home: 42–39; Away: 31–50)
March: 2–1 (Home: 0–0; Away: 2–1)

#	Date	Opponent	Score	Win	Loss	Save	Attendance	Record
1	March 29	@ Dodgers	1–0	**Blach** (1–0)	Kershaw (0–1)	**Strickland** (1)	53,595	1–0
2	March 30	@ Dodgers	1–0	**Watson** (1–0)	Jansen (0–1)	**Strickland** (2)	53,478	2–0
3	March 31	@ Dodgers	0–5	Maeda (1–0)	**Holland** (0–1)	–	45,938	2–1

April: 13–13 (Home: 9–6; Away: 4–7)

#	Date	Opponent	Score	Win	Loss	Save	Attendance	Record
4	April 1	@ Dodgers	0–9	Hill (1–0)	**Stratton** (0–1)	–	41,866	2–2
5	April 3	Mariners	4–6	Gonzales (1–0)	**Blach** (1–1)	Díaz (3)	40,901	2–3
6	April 4	Mariners	10–1	**Cueto** (1–0)	Hernández (0–1)	–	42,582	3–3
–	April 6	Dodgers	Postponed (rain); Rescheduled for April 28 as part of a doubleheader.					
7	April 7	Dodgers	7–5 (14)	**Goméz** (1–0)	Font (0–2)	–	42,308	4–3
8	April 8	Dodgers	1–2 (10)	Fields (1–0)	**Johnson** (0–1)	Jansen (1)	42,374	4–4
9	April 9	Diamondbacks	1–2	Godley (2–0)	**Holland** (0–2)	Bradley (1)	36,997	4–5
10	April 10	Diamondbacks	5–4	**Strickland** (1–0)	de la Rosa (0–1)	–	37,869	5–5
11	April 11	Diamondbacks	3–7	Salas (2–1)	**Suárez** (0–1)	–	35,041	5–6
12	April 12	@ Padres	7–0	**Stratton** (1–1)	Mitchell (0–2)	–	22,288	6–6
13	April 13	@ Padres	1–5	Ross (2–1)	**Blach** (1–2)	–	31,675	6–7
14	April 14	@ Padres	4–5	Cimber (1–1)	**Gearrin** (0–1)	Hand (6)	41,117	6–8
15	April 15	@ Padres	1–10	Lucchesi (2–0)	**Beede** (0–1)	–	34,316	6–9
16	April 17	@ Diamondbacks	0–1	Corbin (3–0)	**Watson** (1–1)	–	19,669	6–10
17	April 18	@ Diamondbacks	4–3 (10)	**Strickland** (2–0)	Boxberger (0–1)	**Gearrin** (1)	16,976	7–10
18	April 19	@ Diamondbacks	1–3	Greinke (2–1)	**Blach** (1–3)	Boxberger (6)	18,736	7–11
19	April 20	@ Angels	8–1	**Samardzija** (1–0)	Heaney (0–1)	–	37,494	8–11
20	April 21	@ Angels	3–4	Richards (3–0)	**Holland** (0–3)	Middleton (5)	42,666	8–12
21	April 22	@ Angels	4–2	**Cueto** (2–0)	Barría (1–1)	**Strickland** (3)	44,544	9–12
22	April 23	Nationals	4–2	**Stratton** (2–1)	González (2–2)	**Strickland** (4)	36,983	10–12
23	April 24	Nationals	4–3	**Moronta** (1–0)	Roark (1–2)	**Strickland** (5)	37,147	11–12
24	April 25	Nationals	2–15	Scherzer (5–1)	**Samardzija** (1–1)	–	35,126	11–13
25	April 27	Dodgers	6–4	**Dyson** (1–0)	Cingrani (0–1)	**Strickland** (6)	41,936	12–13
26	April 28 (1)	Dodgers	6–15	Buehler (1–0)	**Stratton** (2–2)	–	41,809	12–14
27	April 28 (2)	Dodgers	8–3	**Cueto** (3–0)	Wood (0–3)	–	40,608	13–14
28	April 29	Dodgers	4–2	**Blach** (2–3)	Maeda (2–2)	**Strickland** (7)	42,020	14–14
29	April 30	Padres	6–5	**Johnson** (1–1)	Hand (1–3)	–	35,470	15–14

May: 11–16 (Home: 5–4; Away: 6–12)

#	Date	Opponent	Score	Win	Loss	Save	Attendance	Record
30	May 1	Padres	2–3	Yates (1–0)	**Strickland** (2–1)	Hand (7)	36,735	15–15
31	May 2	Padres	9–4	**Holland** (1–3)	Richard (1–4)	–	36,475	16–15
32	May 4	@ Braves	9–4	**Stratton** (3–2)	Foltynewicz (2–2)	–	41,807	17–15
33	May 5	@ Braves	11–2	**Blach** (3–3)	McCarthy (4–1)	–	38,264	18–15
34	May 6	@ Braves	4–3	**Suárez** (1–1)	Soroka (1–1)	**Strickland** (8)	37,896	19–15
35	May 7	@ Phillies	0–11	Eflin (1–0)	**Samardzija** (1–2)	–	17,050	19–16
36	May 8	@ Phillies	2–4	Nola (5–1)	**Holland** (1–4)	Neris (7)	22,456	19–17
37	May 9	@ Phillies	3–11	Pivetta (2–2)	**Stratton** (3–3)	–	18,448	19–18
38	May 10	@ Phillies	3–6	Velasquez (3–4)	**Blach** (3–4)	Neris (8)	30,204	19–19
39	May 11	@ Pirates	2–11	Brault (3–1)	**Suárez** (1–2)	–	34,720	19–20
40	May 12	@ Pirates	5–6	Vázquez (2–0)	**Watson** (1–2)	–	27,502	19–21
41	May 13	@ Pirates	5–0	**Holland** (2–4)	Nova (2–3)	–	22,649	20–21
42	May 14	Reds	10–7	**Stratton** (4–3)	Romano (2–4)	–	36,156	21–21
43	May 15	Reds	5–3	**Johnson** (2–1)	Mahle (3–5)	**Strickland** (9)	37,809	22–21
44	May 16	Reds	3–6	Hughes (2–2)	**Suárez** (1–3)	Iglesias (8)	38,662	22–22
45	May 17	Rockies	3–5 (12)	McGee (1–2)	**Johnson** (2–2)	Davis (16)	37,224	22–23
46	May 18	Rockies	1–6	Freeland (4–4)	**Holland** (2–5)	–	40,970	22–24
47	May 19	Rockies	9–4	**Stratton** (5–3)	Gray (4–6)	–	39,195	23–24
48	May 20	Rockies	9–5	**Dyson** (2–0)	Shaw (1–2)	–	40,334	24–24
49	May 22	@ Astros	2–11	Cole (5–1)	**Suárez** (1–4)	–	35,638	24–25
50	May 23	@ Astros	1–4	Verlander (6–2)	**Samardzija** (1–3)	Giles (9)	31,929	24–26
51	May 25	@ Cubs	2–6	Hendricks (4–3)	**Holland** (2–6)	Morrow (11)	41,177	24–27
52	May 26	@ Cubs	5–4	**Stratton** (6–3)	Quintana (5–4)	**Strickland** (10)	41,250	25–27
53	May 27	@ Cubs	3–8	Rosario (1–0)	**Blach** (3–5)	–	41,587	25–28
54	May 28	@ Rockies	5–6 (10)	Shaw (2–3)	**Strickland** (2–2)	–	32,409	25–29
55	May 29	@ Rockies	4–11	Freeland (5–5)	**Samardzija** (1–4)	–	27,348	25–30
56	May 30	@ Rockies	7–4	**Holland** (3–6)	Musgrave (0–1)	**Strickland** (11)	29,400	26–30

June: 18–10 (Home: 12–4; Away: 6–6)

#	Date	Opponent	Score	Win	Loss	Save	Attendance	Record
57	June 1	Phillies	4–0	**Stratton** (7–3)	Pivetta (4–4)	–	38,119	27–30
58	June 2	Phillies	2–0	**Suárez** (2–4)	Velasquez (4–6)	**Strickland** (12)	39,208	28–30
59	June 3	Phillies	6–1	**Rodríguez** (1–0)	Arrieta (5–3)	–	40,491	29–30
60	June 4	Diamondbacks	10–3	**Johnson** (3–2)	Godley (5–5)	–	36,542	30–30
61	June 5	Diamondbacks	2–3	Corbin (6–2)	**Bumgarner** (0–1)	Boxberger (14)	36,925	30–31
62	June 6	Diamondbacks	5–4 (10)	**Strickland** (3–2)	Chafin (0–2)	–	41,042	31–31
63	June 8	@ Nationals	9–5	**Moronta** (2–0)	Strasburg (6–6)	–	41,591	32–31
64	June 9	@ Nationals	5–7	Miller (3–0)	**Rodríguez** (1–1)	Doolittle (16)	37,701	32–32
65	June 10	@ Nationals	2–0	**Holland** (4–6)	Scherzer (10–2)	**Strickland** (13)	35,705	33–32
66	June 11	@ Marlins	5–7	Conley (2–0)	**Dyson** (2–1)	Barraclough (3)	6,023	33–33
67	June 12	@ Marlins	1–3	Richards (1–3)	**Stratton** (7–4)	Barraclough (4)	5,928	33–34
68	June 13	@ Marlins	4–5	Steckenrider (3–1)	**Moronta** (2–1)	–	6,075	33–35
69	June 14	@ Marlins	6–3 (16)	**Blach** (4–5)	Hernández (0–4)	**Dyson** (1)	9,726	34–35
70	June 15	@ Dodgers	2–3	Stripling (6–1)	**Holland** (4–7)	Jansen (16)	53,433	34–36
71	June 16	@ Dodgers	1–3	Wood (2–5)	**Bumgarner** (0–2)	Jansen (17)	53,706	34–37
72	June 17	@ Dodgers	4–1	**Stratton** (8–4)	Ferguson (0–1)	**Strickland** (14)	49,541	35–37
73	June 18	Marlins	4–5	Guerrero (1–2)	**Strickland** (3–3)	Barraclough (6)	36,743	35–38
74	June 19	Marlins	6–3	**Rodríguez** (2–1)	Straily (2–3)	**Dyson** (2)	37,242	36–38
75	June 20	Marlins	6–5	**Holland** (5–7)	Ureña (2–9)	**Moronta** (1)	35,903	37–38
76	June 21	Padres	3–0	**Bumgarner** (1–2)	Ross (5–5)	**Melancon** (1)	37,497	38–38
77	June 22	Padres	2–6	Richard (7–6)	**Stratton** (8–5)	–	40,546	38–39
78	June 23	Padres	5–3	**Moronta** (3–1)	Cimber (3–4)	–	40,348	39–39
79	June 24	Padres	3–2 (11)	**Blach** (5–5)	Hand (1–4)	–	39,240	40–39
80	June 26	Rockies	3–2	**Watson** (2–2)	Ottavino (3–1)	**Dyson** (3)	36,070	41–39
81	June 27	Rockies	1–0	**Moronta** (4–1)	Musgrave (0–3)	–	36,046	42–39
82	June 28	Rockies	8–9	Ottavino (4–1)	**Dyson** (2–2)	Davis (22)	37,529	42–40
83	June 29	@ Diamondbacks	2–1	**Suárez** (3–4)	Chafin (1–3)	**Smith** (1)	30,981	43–40
84	June 30	@ Diamondbacks	7–0	**Rodríguez** (3–1)	Miller (0–2)	–	38,117	44–40

July: 11–14 (Home: 6–8; Away: 5–6)

#	Date	Opponent	Score	Win	Loss	Save	Attendance	Record
85	July 1	@ Diamondbacks	9–6	**Gearrin** (1–1)	Godley (9–6)	**Smith** (2)	29,721	45–40
86	July 2	@ Rockies	2–5	Freeland (8–6)	**Bumgarner** (1–3)	Davis (24)	40,333	45–41
87	July 3	@ Rockies	1–8	Senzatela (3–1)	**Stratton** (8–6)	–	48,072	45–42
88	July 4	@ Rockies	0–1	Anderson (6–3)	**Suárez** (3–5)	Davis (25)	48,158	45–43
89	July 5	Cardinals	2–11	Weaver (5–7)	**Cueto** (3–1)	–	38,766	45–44
90	July 6	Cardinals	3–2	**Moronta** (5–1)	Brebbia (1–2)	**Smith** (3)	37,996	46–44
91	July 7	Cardinals	2–3	Martinez (6–4)	**Samardzija** (1–5)	Norris (17)	39,606	46–45
92	July 8	Cardinals	13–8	**Bumgarner** (2–3)	Brebbia (1–3)	–	38,855	47–45
93	July 9	Cubs	2–1 (11)	**Blach** (6–5)	Cishek (2–1)	–	38,024	48–45
94	July 10	Cubs	0–2	Quintana (8–6)	**Holland** (5–8)	Cishek (3)	39,113	48–46
95	July 11	Cubs	5–4 (13)	**Rodríguez** (4–1)	Norwood (0–1)	–	41,099	49–46
96	July 13	Athletics	7–1	**Bumgarner** (3–3)	Jackson (1–1)	–	41,751	50–46
97	July 14	Athletics	3–4	Petit (4–2)	**Watson** (2–3)	Treinen (24)	41,970	50–47
98	July 15	Athletics	2–6	Manaea (9–6)	**Suárez** (3–6)	–	42,098	50–48
–	July 17	**89th All-Star Game in Washington, D.C.**						
99	July 20	@ Athletics	5–1	**Rodríguez** (5–1)	Jackson (1–2)	–	45,606	51–48
100	July 21	@ Athletics	3–4 (11)	Petit (5–2)	**Smith** (0–1)	–	56,310	51–49
101	July 22	@ Athletics	5–6 (10)	Familia (5–4)	**Blach** (6–6)	–	44,374	51–50
102	July 24	@ Mariners	4–3	**Watson** (3–3)	Díaz (0–3)	**Smith** (4)	40,276	52–50
103	July 25	@ Mariners	2–3	Colomé (3–5)	**Watson** (3–4)	Díaz (38)	45,548	52–51
104	July 26	Brewers	5–7	Hader (3–0)	**Melancon** (0–1)	Knebel (13)	40,643	52–52
105	July 27	Brewers	1–3	Anderson (7–7)	**Bumgarner** (3–4)	Knebel (14)	40,414	52–53
106	July 28	Brewers	1–7	Chacin (10–3)	**Cueto** (3–2)	–	40,735	52–54
107	July 29	Brewers	8–5	**Suárez** (4–6)	Guerra (6–7)	**Smith** (5)	41,312	53–54
108	July 30	@ Padres	5–3 (12)	**Smith** (1–1)	Strahm (2–3)	–	31,725	54–54
109	July 31	@ Padres	3–2 (10)	**Watson** (4–4)	Maton (0–2)	**Smith** (6)	29,209	55–54

August: 13–14 (Home: 7–6; Away: 6–8)

#	Date	Opponent	Score	Win	Loss	Save	Attendance	Record
110	August 2	@ Diamondbacks	8–1	**Bumgarner** (4–4)	Greinke (12–6)	–	22,980	56–54
111	August 3	@ Diamondbacks	3–6	Corbin (8–4)	**Stratton** (8–7)	Boxberger (26)	27,581	56–55
112	August 4	@ Diamondbacks	3–9	Buchholz (5–1)	**Suárez** (4–7)	–	38,093	56–56
113	August 5	@ Diamondbacks	3–2	**Black** (1–0)	Bradley (3–3)	**Smith** (7)	27,884	57–56
114	August 6	Astros	1–3	Osuna (1–0)	**Smith** (1–2)	Rondón (12)	40,251	57–57
115	August 7	Astros	1–2	Smith (4–1)	**Black** (1–1)	Rondón (13)	41,613	57–58
116	August 9	Pirates	5–10	Nova (7–6)	**Suárez** (4–8)	–	40,035	57–59
117	August 10	Pirates	13–10	**Holland** (6–8)	Holmes (1–2)	–	41,762	58–59
118	August 11	Pirates	0–4	Williams (10–8)	**Blach** (6–7)	–	41,209	58–60
119	August 12	Pirates	4–3	**Rodríguez** (6–1)	Musgrove (4–7)	**Smith** (8)	41,980	59–60
120	August 13	@ Dodgers	5–2	**Black** (2–1)	Alexander (2–1)	**Smith** (9)	45,229	60–60
121	August 14	@ Dodgers	2–1	**Dyson** (3–2)	Maeda (7–8)	**Smith** (10)	46,734	61–60
122	August 15	@ Dodgers	3–4 (12)	Báez (4–3)	**Kelly** (0–1)	–	44,987	61–61
123	August 17	@ Reds	1–2 (11)	Hernandez (5–0)	**Black** (2–2)	–	19,540	61–62
124	August 18	@ Reds	1–7	Harvey (6–7)	**Bumgarner** (4–5)	–	23,878	61–63
125	August 19	@ Reds	4–11	Castillo (7–10)	**Suárez** (4–9)	–	22,756	61–64
126	August 20	@ Mets	2–1 (13)	**Law** (1–0)	Bashlor (0–2)	–	24,811	62–64
127	August 21	@ Mets	3–6	Oswalt (3–2)	**Watson** (4–5)	–	24,999	62–65
128	August 22	@ Mets	3–5	Syndergaard (9–3)	**Kelly** (0–2)	Sewald (1)	28,157	62–66
129	August 23	@ Mets	3–1	**Bumgarner** (5–5)	deGrom (8–8)	**Smith** (11)	25,584	63–66
130	August 24	Rangers	6–7 (10)	Gearrin (2–1)	**Dyson** (3–3)	Leclerc (7)	39,845	63–67
131	August 25	Rangers	5–3	**Suárez** (5–9)	Pérez (2–6)	**Melancon** (2)	40,287	64–67
132	August 26	Rangers	3–1	**Holland** (7–8)	Gallardo (7–3)	**Melancon** (3)	39,260	65–67
133	August 27	Diamondbacks	2–0	**Stratton** (9–7)	Corbin (10–5)	**Strickland** (14)	38,808	66–67
134	August 28	Diamondbacks	1–0	**Smith** (2–2)	Ziegler (1–6)	–	37,276	67–67
135	August 29	Diamondbacks	1–3	Godley (14–7)	**Rodríguez** (6–2)	Boxberger (30)	35,626	67–68
136	August 31	Mets	7–0	**Suárez** (6–9)	Wheeler (9–7)	–	39,057	68–68

September: 5–21 (Home: 3–11; Away: 2–10)

#	Date	Opponent	Score	Win	Loss	Save	Attendance	Record
137	September 1	Mets	1–2 (11)	Blevins (2–2)	**Strickland** (3–4)	Gsellman (9)	38,875	68–69
138	September 2	Mets	1–4	Syndergaard (10–3)	**Stratton** (9–8)	–	39,692	68–70
139	September 3	@ Rockies	8–9	Oh (2–0)	**Watson** (4–6)	Davis (38)	43,256	68–71
140	September 4	@ Rockies	2–6	Rusin (2–2)	**Moronta** (5–2)	–	24,727	68–72
141	September 5	@ Rockies	3–5	Musgrave (2–3)	**Suárez** (6–10)	Ottavino (6)	24,790	68–73
142	September 7	@ Brewers	2–4	Hader (5–1)	**Strickland** (3–5)	Jeffress (9)	30,916	68–74
143	September 8	@ Brewers	3–4	González (8–11)	**Stratton** (9–9)	Jeffress (10)	25,814	68–75
144	September 9	@ Brewers	3–6	Burnes (4–0)	**Bumgarner** (5–6)	Knebel (15)	35,388	68–76
145	September 10	Braves	1–4	Newcomb (12–8)	**Rodríguez** (6–3)	Minter (14)	35,996	68–77
146	September 11	Braves	1–4	Foltynewicz (11–9)	**Suárez** (6–11)	–	35,285	68–78
147	September 12	Braves	1–2	Winkler (3–0)	**Smith** (2–3)	Venters (2)	38,156	68–79
148	September 14	Rockies	2–0	**Stratton** (10–9)	Anderson (6–9)	–	37,800	69–79
149	September 15	Rockies	3–0	**Bumgarner** (6–6)	Márquez (12–10)	**Smith** (12)	38,204	70–79
150	September 16	Rockies	2–3	Senzatela (5–6)	**Rodríguez** (6–4)	Davis (40)	38,824	70–80
151	September 17	@ Padres	4–2	**Suárez** (7–11)	Mitchell (1–4)	**Smith** (13)	23,653	71–80
152	September 18	@ Padres	5–4	**Dyson** (4–3)	Stammen (8–3)	**Smith** (14)	26,285	72–80
153	September 19	@ Padres	4–8	Erlin (4–7)	**Stratton** (10–10)	–	31,933	72–81
154	September 21	@ Cardinals	3–5	Brebbia (3–3)	**Melancon** (0–2)	Martínez (4)	45,892	72–82
155	September 22	@ Cardinals	4–5 (10)	Martínez (8–6)	**Melancon** (0–3)	–	45,878	72–83
156	September 23	@ Cardinals	2–9	Mikolas (17–4)	**Suárez** (7–12)	–	46,596	72–84
157	September 24	Padres	0–5	Mitchell (2–4)	**Holland** (7–9)	Yates (11)	35,428	72–85
158	September 25	Padres	5–4 (12)	**Melancon** (1–3)	Wick (0–1)	–	36,063	73–85
159	September 26	Padres	2–3	Díaz (1–0)	**Kelly** (0–3)	Yates (12)	36,044	73–86
160	September 28	Dodgers	1–3	Ryu (7–3)	**Bumgarner** (6–7)	Jansen (38)	41,167	73–87
161	September 29	Dodgers	6–10	Wood (9–7)	**Melancon** (1–4)	—	41,768	73–88
162	September 30	Dodgers	0–15	Hill (11–5)	**Suárez** (7–13)	—	41,280	73–89

== Roster ==
2018 San Francisco Giants
Roster
Pitchers: 38 Tyler Beede; 50 Ty Blach; 62 Ray Black; 40 Madison Bumgarner; 47 Johnny Cueto; 49 Sam Dyson; 26 Cory Gearrin; 67 Roberto Goméz; 45 Derek Holland; 58 Pierce Johnson; 68 Casey Kelly; 64 Derek Law; 41 Mark Melancon; 54 Reyes Moronta; 32 Steven Okert; 61 Josh Osich; 57 Dereck Rodríguez; 29 Jeff Samardzija; 13 Will Smith; 62 D. J. Snelten; 34 Chris Stratton; 60 Hunter Strickland; 59 Andrew Suárez; 66 José Valdez; 56 Tony Watson	Catchers: 5 Nick Hundley; 28 Buster Posey; Infielders: 46 Abiatal Avelino; 9 Brandon Belt; 35 Brandon Crawford; 2 Chase d'Arnaud; 16 Aramis Garcia; 52 Miguel Gómez; 19 Alen Hanson; 14 Ryder Jones; 10 Evan Longoria; 12 Joe Panik; 48 Pablo Sandoval; 37 Kelby Tomlinson	Outfielders: 1 Gregor Blanco; 6 Steven Duggar; 7 Gorkys Hernández; 16 Austin Jackson; 22 Andrew McCutchen; 8 Hunter Pence; 26 Chris Shaw; 53 Austin Slater; 51 Mac Williamson	Manager: 15 Bruce Bochy; Coaches: 17 José Alguacil (first base); 91 Chad Chop (special assistant); 21 Shawon Dunston (special assistant); 77 Matt Herges (bullpen); 31 Hensley Meulens (bench); 33 Alonzo Powell (hitting); 39 Rick Schu (assistant hitting); 99 Taira Uematsu (bullpen catcher); 88 Eli Whiteside (bullpen catcher); 23 Ron Wotus (third base); 43 Curt Young (pitching)

== Player stats ==
=== Batting ===
Note: G = Games played; AB = At bats; R = Runs; H = Hits; 2B = Doubles; 3B = Triples; HR = Home runs; RBI = Runs batted in; SB = Stolen bases; BB = Walks; AVG = Batting average; SLG = Slugging average

Player	G	AB	R	H	2B	3B	HR	RBI	SB	BB	AVG	SLG
Brandon Crawford	151	531	63	135	28	2	14	54	4	50	.254	.394
Andrew McCutchen	130	482	65	123	28	2	15	55	13	73	.255	.415
Evan Longoria	125	480	51	117	25	4	16	54	3	22	.244	.413
Gorkys Hernández	142	414	52	97	16	2	15	40	8	27	.234	.391
Brandon Belt	112	399	50	101	18	2	14	46	4	49	.253	.414
Buster Posey	105	398	47	113	22	1	5	41	3	45	.284	.382
Joe Panik	102	358	38	91	14	1	4	24	4	26	.254	.332
Alen Hanson	110	294	36	74	17	5	8	39	7	9	.252	.425
Nick Hundley	96	282	34	68	13	2	10	31	2	22	.241	.408
Hunter Pence	97	235	19	53	11	1	4	24	5	11	.226	.332
Pablo Sandoval	92	230	22	57	10	1	9	40	0	19	.248	.417
Austin Slater	74	199	21	50	6	1	1	23	7	20	.251	.307
Gregor Blanco	68	189	19	41	7	3	2	12	6	12	.217	.317
Austin Jackson	59	149	12	36	8	0	0	13	2	14	.242	.295
Steven Duggar	41	141	20	36	11	1	2	17	5	10	.255	.390
Kelby Tomlinson	63	140	9	29	4	2	0	10	0	9	.207	.264
Mac Williamson	28	94	14	20	4	0	4	11	1	11	.213	.383
Chase d'Arnaud	42	93	9	20	5	0	3	9	2	4	.215	.366
Aramis Garcia	19	63	8	18	1	0	4	9	0	2	.286	.492
Chris Shaw	22	54	2	10	2	0	1	7	1	7	.185	.278
Miguel Gómez	9	15	3	4	0	0	0	1	0	0	.267	.267
Abiatal Avelino	6	11	1	3	0	0	0	0	0	0	.273	.273
Ryder Jones	5	8	2	3	0	0	2	3	0	0	.375	1.125
Pitcher totals	162	282	6	25	5	0	0	10	0	6	.089	.106
Team totals	162	5541	603	1324	255	30	133	573	77	.448	.239	.368

=== Pitching ===
Note: W = Wins; L = Losses; ERA = Earned run average; G = Games pitched; GS = Games started; SV = Saves; IP = Innings pitched; H = Hits allowed; R = Runs allowed; ER = Earned runs allowed; BB = Walks allowed; SO = Strikeouts

Player	W	L	ERA	G	GS	SV	IP	H	R	ER	BB	SO
Derek Holland	7	9	3.57	36	30	0	171.1	154	74	68	67	169
Andrew Suárez	7	13	4.49	29	29	0	160.1	163	85	80	45	130
Chris Stratton	10	10	5.09	28	26	0	145.0	153	87	82	54	112
Madison Bumgarner	6	7	3.26	21	21	0	129.2	118	51	47	43	109
Ty Blach	6	7	4.25	47	13	0	118.2	133	62	56	41	75
Dereck Rodriguez	6	4	2.81	21	19	0	118.1	98	43	37	36	89
Sam Dyson	4	3	2.69	74	0	3	70.1	56	23	21	20	56
Tony Watson	4	6	2.59	72	0	0	66.0	54	19	19	14	72
Reyes Moronta	5	2	2.49	69	0	1	65.0	34	20	18	37	79
Will Smith	2	3	2.55	54	0	14	53.0	37	18	15	15	71
Johnny Cueto	3	2	3.23	9	9	0	53.0	46	19	19	13	38
Hunter Strickland	3	5	3.97	49	0	14	45.1	43	25	20	21	37
Jeff Samardzija	1	5	6.25	10	10	0	44.2	47	32	31	26	30
Pierce Johnson	3	2	5.56	37	0	0	43.2	38	27	27	22	36
Mark Melancon	1	4	3.23	41	0	3	39.0	48	18	14	14	31
Cory Gearrin	1	1	4.20	35	0	1	30.0	33	14	14	13	31
Casey Kelly	0	3	3.04	7	3	0	23.2	28	10	8	5	16
Ray Black	2	2	6.17	26	0	0	23.1	17	16	16	10	33
Derek Law	1	0	7.43	7	0	0	13.1	16	13	11	8	12
Josh Osich	0	0	8.25	12	0	0	12.0	20	11	11	7	10
Roberto Goméz	1	0	7.71	5	0	0	9.1	20	11	8	1	8
Tyler Beede	0	1	8.22	2	2	0	7.2	9	7	7	8	9
Steven Okert	0	0	1.23	10	0	0	7.1	4	1	1	0	8
José Valdez	0	0	12.60	4	0	0	5.0	8	7	7	1	4
D. J. Snelten	0	0	10.38	4	0	0	4.1	9	6	5	3	4
Chase d'Arnaud	0	0	0.00	1	0	0	1.0	1	0	0	0	0
Pablo Sandoval	0	0	0.00	1	0	0	1.0	0	0	0	0	0
Team totals	73	89	3.95	162	162	36	1461.1	1387	699	641	524	1269

== Farm system ==
Level	Team	League	Manager
AAA	Sacramento River Cats	Pacific Coast League	
AA	Richmond Flying Squirrels	Eastern League	
A-Advanced	San Jose Giants	California League	
A	Augusta GreenJackets	South Atlantic League	
A-Short Season	Salem-Keizer Volcanoes	Northwest League	
Rookie	AZL Giants	Arizona League	
Rookie	DSL Giants	Dominican Summer League	
