= 2018 Arizona Diamondbacks season =

2018 Arizona Diamondbacks
- League: National League
- Division: West
- Ballpark: Chase Field
- City: Phoenix, Arizona
- Record: 82–80 (.506)
- Divisional place: 3rd
- Owners: Ken Kendrick
- General managers: Mike Hazen
- Managers: Torey Lovullo
- Television: Fox Sports Arizona (Steve Berthiaume, Bob Brenly, Greg Schulte)
- Radio: KMVP-FM (98.7) (Greg Schulte, Tom Candiotti, Mike Ferrin); KSUN (Spanish)
- Stats: ESPN.com; Baseball Reference

The 2018 Arizona Diamondbacks season was the franchise's 20th season in Major League Baseball and their 20th season at Chase Field in Phoenix, Arizona as members of the National League West. They were managed by Torey Lovullo in his second season with the Diamondbacks.

The Diamondbacks began the regular season on March 29 against the Colorado Rockies and finished the season on September 30 against the San Diego Padres. The D-backs were in first place in the National League West on April 1, May 1, July 1, August 1 and September 1, but missed the playoffs after a September collapse.

The Diamondbacks started the season with nine consecutive series wins, the first National League team to do so since the 1907 Cubs. On July 7, the D-backs broke the franchise record for runs scored in a single game when they beat the Padres 20–5.

== Offseason ==
=== Transactions ===
October 18, 2017	Announced chief baseball analyst Tony La Russa is leaving the organization.
October 26, 2017	Promoted Jerry Narron to bench coach and Ken Crenshaw to director of sports medicine, performance. Named Luis Urueta coach and did not renew the contract of Ariel Prieto as coach and interpreter.
November 6, 2017	Exercised the 2018 option on INF Daniel Descalso.
November 30, 2017	Traded RHP Curtis Taylor to Tampa Bay for RHP Brad Boxberger.
December 1, 2017	Failed to tender contract offer to RHP J.J. Hoover and LHP T.J. McFarland.
December 9, 2017	Claimed LHP Henry Owens off waivers from Boston.
February 21, 2018	Traded INF Brandon Drury to New York Yankees and LHP Anthony Banda and two PTBNL to Tampa Bay. Received RHP Taylor Widener from New York and OF Steven Souza Jr. from Tampa Bay

== Regular season ==
In 2018, the Diamondbacks introduced a bullpen car, making them the first MLB team to use one since the Milwaukee Brewers in 1995.

=== Game log ===
2018 Game Log 82–80 (Home: 40–41; Away: 42–39)
March/April: 20–8 (Home: 10–3; Away: 10–5)

#	Date	Opponent	Score	Win	Loss	Save	Attendance	Record	Streak
1	March 29	Rockies	8–2	**Corbin** (1–0)	Gray (0–1)		48,703	1–0	W1
2	March 30	Rockies	9–8	**Ray** (1–0)	Senzatela (0–1)	**Boxberger** (1)	23,937	2–0	W2
3	March 31	Rockies	1–2	Shaw (1–0)	**Salas** (0–1)	Davis (1)	33,346	2–1	L1
4	April 2	Dodgers	8–7 (15)	**Salas** (1–1)	Font (0–1)	—	21,735	3–1	W1
5	April 3	Dodgers	6–1	**Godley** (1–0)	Kershaw (0–2)	—	27,574	4–1	W2
6	April 4	Dodgers	3–0	**Corbin** (2–0)	Wood (0–1)	**Boxberger** (2)	25,754	5–1	W3
7	April 5	@ Cardinals	3–1	**Ray** (2–0)	Wainwright (0–1)	**Boxberger** (3)	46,512	6–1	W4
8	April 7	@ Cardinals	3–5	Wacha (1–1)	**Greinke** (0–1)	Norris (1)	41,113	6–2	L1
9	April 8	@ Cardinals	4–1	**Hirano** (1–0)	Leone (0–2)	**Boxberger** (4)	40,468	7–2	W1
10	April 9	@ Giants	2–1	**Godley** (2–0)	Holland (0–2)	**Bradley** (1)	36,997	8–2	W2
11	April 10	@ Giants	4–5	Strickland (1–0)	**de la Rosa** (0–1)	—	37,869	8–3	L1
12	April 11	@ Giants	7–3	**Salas** (2–1)	Suarez (0–1)	—	35,041	9–3	W1
13	April 13	@ Dodgers	8–7	**Greinke** (1–1)	Maeda (1–1)	**Boxberger** (5)	43,791	10–3	W2
14	April 14	@ Dodgers	9–1	**McFarland** (1–0)	Hill (1–1)	—	44,306	11–3	W3
15	April 15	@ Dodgers	2–7	Kershaw (1–2)	**Godley** (2–1)	—	47,527	11–4	L1
16	April 17	Giants	1–0	**Corbin** (3–0)	Watson (1–1)	—	19,669	12–4	W1
17	April 18	Giants	3–4 (10)	Strickland (2–0)	**Boxberger** (0–1)	Gearrin (1)	16,976	12–5	L1
18	April 19	Giants	3–1	**Greinke** (2–1)	Blach (1–3)	**Boxberger** (6)	18,736	13–5	W1
19	April 20	Padres	1–4	Hand (1–2)	**Boxberger** (0–2)	—	24,902	13–6	L1
20	April 21	Padres	6–2	**Godley** (3–1)	Richard (1–2)	—	38,820	14–6	W1
21	April 22	Padres	4–2	**Corbin** (4–0)	Lucchesi (2–1)	**Bradley** (2)	31,061	15–6	W2
22	April 24	@ Phillies	8–4	**Salas** (3–1)	Velasquez (1–3)	—	18,195	16–6	W3
23	April 25	@ Phillies	3–5	Arrieta (3–0)	**Greinke** (2–2)	Neris (5)	21,349	16–7	L1
24	April 26	@ Phillies	8–2	**Koch** (1–0)	Lively (0–2)	—	20,335	17–7	W1
25	April 27	@ Nationals	5–4	**Godley** (4–1)	Strasburg (2–3)	**Boxberger** (7)	26,517	18–7	W2
26	April 28	@ Nationals	4–3 (10)	**Hirano** (2–0)	Solis (0–1)	**Boxberger** (8)	32,963	19–7	W3
27	April 29	@ Nationals	1–3	González (3–2)	**McFarland** (1–1)	Doolittle (5)	30,285	19–8	L1
28	April 30	Dodgers	8–5	**Greinke** (3–2)	Stripling (0–1)	**Boxberger** (9)	17,562	20–8	W1

May: 8–19 (Home: 6–10; Away: 2–9)

#	Date	Opponent	Score	Win	Loss	Save	Attendance	Record	Streak
29	May 1	Dodgers	4–3	**Bracho** (1–0)	Liberatore (1–1)	**Boxberger** (10)	18,940	21–8	W2
30	May 2	Dodgers	1–2	Hudson (1–0)	**Godley** (4–2)	Jansen (4)	19,531	21–9	L1
31	May 3	Dodgers	2–5	Chargois (1–0)	**Salas** (3–2)	Jansen (5)	21,407	21–10	L2
32	May 4	Astros	0–8	Cole (3–1)	**Medlen** (0–1)	—	29,463	21–11	L3
33	May 5	Astros	4–3	**Boxberger** (1–2)	Devenski (1–1)	—	39,154	22–11	W1
34	May 6	Astros	3–1	**Koch** (2–0)	Verlander (4–1)	**Boxberger** (11)	35,632	23–11	W2
35	May 8	@ Dodgers	8–5 (12)	**McFarland** (2–1)	García (0–1)	—	45,894	24–11	W3
36	May 9	@ Dodgers	3–6	Báez (1–1)	**Salas** (3–3)	Jansen (6)	45,600	24–12	L1
37	May 10	Nationals	1–2 (11)	Kintzler (1–2)	**Salas** (3–4)	Doolittle (7)	17,397	24–13	L2
38	May 11	Nationals	1–3	Scherzer (7–1)	**Koch** (2–1)	Doolittle (8)	22,901	24–14	L3
39	May 12	Nationals	1–2	Strasburg (5–3)	**Scribner** (0–1)	Madson (3)	29,428	24–15	L4
40	May 13	Nationals	4–6	Madson (1–2)	**Bradley** (0–1)	Doolittle (9)	31,906	24–16	L5
41	May 14	Brewers	2–7	Guerra (3–3)	**Corbin** (4–1)	—	17,390	24–17	L6
42	May 15	Brewers	2–1	**Bradley** (1–1)	Williams (0–1)	**Boxberger** (12)	17,914	25–17	W1
43	May 16	Brewers	2–8	Woodruff (2–0)	**Koch** (2–2)	—	16,762	25–18	L1
44	May 18	@ Mets	1–3	deGrom (4–0)	**Godley** (4–3)	Familia (12)	31,285	25–19	L2
45	May 19	@ Mets	4–5	Familia (2–1)	**Chafin** (0–1)	—	39,515	25–20	L3
46	May 20	@ Mets	1–4	Syndergaard (4–1)	**de la Rosa** (0–2)	Gsellman (1)	34,894	25–21	L4
47	May 21	@ Brewers	2–4	Anderson (4–3)	**Greinke** (3–3)	Knebel (2)	27,094	25–22	L5
48	May 22	@ Brewers	0–1	Albers (3–1)	**Koch** (2–3)	Knebel (3)	27,065	25–23	L6
49	May 23	@ Brewers	2–9	Suter (4–3)	**Godley** (4–4)	—	29,237	25–24	L7
50	May 25	@ A's	7–1	**Corbin** (5–1)	Manaea (5–5)	—	22,691	26–24	W1
51	May 26	@ A's	0–3	Mengden (5–4)	**Buchholz** (0–1)	—	17,580	26–25	L1
52	May 27	@ A's	1–2	Montas (1–0)	**Greinke** (3–4)	Treinen (12)	13,947	26–26	L2
53	May 28	Reds	12–5	**Koch** (3–3)	Bailey (1–7)	—	29,924	27–26	W1
54	May 29	Reds	5–2	**Godley** (5–4)	Castillo (4–5)	**Boxberger** (13)	20,046	28–26	W2
55	May 30	Reds	4–7	Romano (3–6)	**Corbin** (5–2)	Iglesias (9)	18,340	28–27	L1

June : 19–9 (Home: 7–5; Away: 12–4)

#	Date	Opponent	Score	Win	Loss	Save	Attendance	Record	Streak
56	June 1	Marlins	9–1	**Buchholz** (1–1)	Hernandez (0–3)	—	25,866	29–27	W1
57	June 2	Marlins	6–2	**Greinke** (4–4)	Smith (4–6)	—	34,117	30–27	W2
58	June 3	Marlins	6–1	**Koch** (4–3)	Straily (2–2)	—	31,727	31–27	W3
59	June 4	@ Giants	3–10	Johnson (3–2)	**Godley** (5–5)	—	36,542	31–28	L1
60	June 5	@ Giants	3–2	**Corbin** (6–2)	Bumgarner (0–1)	**Boxberger** (14)	36,925	32–28	W1
61	June 6	@ Giants	4–5 (10)	Strickland (3–2)	**Chafin** (0–2)	—	41,042	32–29	L1
62	June 8	@ Rockies	9–4	**Greinke** (5–4)	Márquez (4–6)	—	38,917	33–29	W1
63	June 9	@ Rockies	12–7	**Bracho** (2–0)	Shaw (2–5)	—	43,197	34–29	W2
64	June 10	@ Rockies	8–3	**Godley** (6–5)	Freeland (6–6)	—	36,433	35–29	W3
65	June 11	Pirates	9–5	**Bradley** (2–1)	Crick (0–1)	—	20,927	36–29	W4
66	June 12	Pirates	13–8	**Salas** (4–4)	Williams (5–4)	—	22,488	37–29	W5
67	June 13	Pirates	4–5	Taillon (4–5)	**Greinke** (5–5)	Vázquez (12)	32,803	37–30	L1
68	June 14	Mets	6–3	**Koch** (5–3)	Vargas (2–5)	**Boxberger** (15)	23,300	38–30	W1
69	June 15	Mets	7–3	**Godley** (7–5)	Lugo (2–2)	**Boxberger** (16)	32,170	39–30	W2
70	June 16	Mets	1–5	Matz (3–4)	**Corbin** (6–3)	—	31,824	39–31	L1
71	June 17	Mets	3–5	Familia (3–3)	**Boxberger** (1–3)	Gsellman (3)	47,907	39–32	L2
72	June 18	@ Angels	7–4	**Greinke** (6–5)	Barria (5–3)	**Bradley** (3)	33,809	40–32	W1
73	June 19	@ Angels	4–5	Álvarez (3–2)	**Koch** (5–4)	Parker (8)	33,088	40–33	L1
74	June 21	@ Pirates	9–3	**Godley** (8–5)	Kuhl (5–5)	—	20,554	41–33	W1
75	June 22	@ Pirates	2–1 (13)	**Chafin** (1–2)	Glasnow (1–2)	**McFarland** (1)	24,843	42–33	W2
76	June 23	@ Pirates	7–2	**Greinke** (7–5)	Musgrove (2–3)	—	21,121	43–33	W3
77	June 24	@ Pirates	3–0	**Buchholz** (2–1)	Williams (6–5)	**Boxberger** (17)	19,207	44–33	W4
78	June 25	@ Marlins	5–9	Straily (3–3)	**Miller** (0–1)	—	6,105	44–34	L1
79	June 26	@ Marlins	5–3	**Godley** (9–5)	Hernández (0–5)	**Boxberger** (18)	6,159	45–34	W1
80	June 27	@ Marlins	2–1	**Ray** (3–0)	Chen (2–5)	**Boxberger** (19)	6,382	46–34	W2
81	June 28	@ Marlins	4–0	**Greinke** (8–5)	Richards (2–5)	—	12,715	47–34	W3
82	June 29	Giants	1–2	Suarez (3–4)	**Chafin** (1–3)	Smith (1)	30,981	47–35	L1
83	June 30	Giants	0–7	Rodríguez (3–1)	**Miller** (0–2)	—	38,117	47–36	L2

July: 13–13 (Home: 5–8; Away: 8–5)

#	Date	Opponent	Score	Win	Loss	Save	Attendance	Record	Streak
84	July 1	Giants	6–9	Gearrin (1–1)	**Godley** (9–6)	Smith (2)	29,721	47–37	L3
85	July 2	Cardinals	3–6	Martínez (5–4)	**Ray** (3–1)	Norris (16)	20,334	47–38	L4
86	July 3	Cardinals	4–2	**Greinke** (9–5)	Flaherty (3–4)	**Boxberger** (20)	25,843	48–38	W1
87	July 4	Cardinals	4–8	Mikolas (9–3)	**Hirano** (2–1)	—	44,072	48–39	L1
88	July 5	Padres	3–6	Lauer (4–5)	**Miller** (0–3)	Hand (24)	17,982	48–40	L2
89	July 6	Padres	3–1	**Godley** (10–6)	Lucchesi (4–4)	**Boxberger** (21)	25,128	49–40	W1
90	July 7	Padres	20–5	**Delgado** (1–0)	Ross (5–7)	—	27,091	50–40	W2
91	July 8	Padres	3–4 (16)	Hand (2–4)	**Mathis** (0–1)	—	24,869	50–41	L1
92	July 10	@ Rockies	5–3	**Delgado** (2–0)	McGee (1–3)	**Boxberger** (22)	43,405	51–41	W1
93	July 11	@ Rockies	2–19	Márquez (8–8)	**Miller** (0–4)	—	33,919	51–42	L1
94	July 12	@ Rockies	1–5	Oberg (3–0)	**Ray** (3–2)	—	41,410	51–43	L2
95	July 13	@ Braves	2–1	**Godley** (11–6)	Freeman (2–5)	**Boxberger** (23)	42,130	52–43	W1
96	July 14	@ Braves	3–0	**Greinke** (10–5)	Newcomb (8–5)	**Boxberger** (24)	40,862	53–43	W2
97	July 15	@ Braves	1–5	Teherán (7–6)	**Corbin** (6–4)	—	27,323	53–44	L1
–	July 17	**89th All-Star Game in Washington, D.C.**							
98	July 20	Rockies	10–11	Oberg (5–0)	**Bradley** (2–2)	Ottavino (3)	29,546	53–45	L2
99	July 21	Rockies	5–6	Oberg (6–0)	**Hirano** (2–2)	Davis (28)	43,340	53–46	L3
100	July 22	Rockies	6–1	**Greinke** (11–5)	Senzatela (3–3)	—	32,985	54–46	W1
101	July 23	@ Cubs	7–1	**Corbin** (7–4)	Farrell (3–4)	—	40,859	55–46	W2
102	July 24	@ Cubs	5–1	**Buchholz** (3–1)	Hendricks (6–9)	—	40,869	56–46	W3
103	July 25	@ Cubs	1–2	Edwards Jr. (3–1)	**McFarland** (2–2)	Strop (4)	35,548	56–47	L1
104	July 26	@ Cubs	6–7	Butler (1–1)	**Boxberger** (1–4)	—	38,978	56–48	L2
105	July 27	@ Padres	6–2	**Greinke** (12–5)	Perdomo (1–6)	—	34,725	57–48	W1
106	July 28	@ Padres	9–4	**Bradley** (3–2)	Maton (0–1)	—	37,149	58–48	W2
107	July 29	@ Padres	5–4	**Buchholz** (4–1)	Lucchesi (5–6)	**Boxberger** (25)	32,529	59–48	W3
108	July 30	Rangers	5–9	Butler (2–1)	**Andriese** (3–5)	—	20,639	59–49	L1
109	July 31	Rangers	6–0	**Godley** (12–6)	Colón (5–10)	—	21,877	60–49	W1

August: 14–12 (Home: 7–5; Away: 7–7)

#	Date	Opponent	Score	Win	Loss	Save	Attendance	Record	Streak
110	August 2	Giants	1–8	Bumgarner (4–4)	**Greinke** (12–6)	—	22,980	60–50	L1
111	August 3	Giants	6–3	**Corbin** (8–4)	Stratton (8–7)	**Boxberger** (26)	27,581	61–50	W1
112	August 4	Giants	9–3	**Buchholz** (5–1)	Suarez (4–7)	—	38,093	62–50	W2
113	August 5	Giants	2–3	Black (1–0)	**Bradley** (3–3)	Smith (7)	27,884	62–51	L1
114	August 6	Phillies	3–2 (14)	**Hirano** (3–2)	Davis (1–2)	—	21,131	63–51	W1
115	August 7	Phillies	2–5	Pivetta (7–9)	**Greinke** (12–7)	Neshek (2)	22,382	63–52	L1
116	August 8	Phillies	6–0	**Corbin** (9–4)	Velasquez (8–9)	—	23,384	64–52	W1
117	August 10	@ Reds	0–3	DeSclafani (6–3)	**Buchholz** (5–2)	Iglesias (22)	19,089	64–53	L1
118	August 11	@ Reds	3–6	Garrett (1–2)	**Bradley** (3–4)	Iglesias (23)	29,348	64–54	L2
119	August 12	@ Reds	9–2	**Godley** (13–6)	Castillo (6–10)	—	17,909	65–54	W1
120	August 13	@ Rangers	3–5	Colón (7–10)	**Greinke** (12–8)	Leclerc (2)	18,204	65–55	L1
121	August 14	@ Rangers	6–4	**Corbin** (10–4)	Gallardo (7–2)	**Boxberger** (27)	19,353	66–55	W1
122	August 16	@ Padres	5–1	**Buchholz** (6–2)	Nix (1–1)	—	20,617	67–55	W2
123	August 17	@ Padres	9–4	**Hirano** (4–2)	Lucchesi (6–7)	—	20,010	68–55	W3
124	August 18	@ Padres	6–7	Stammen (6–2)	**Chafin** (1–4)	—	24,440	68–56	L1
125	August 19	@ Padres	4–3	**Bradley** (4–4)	Yates (4–2)	**Boxberger** (28)	22,346	69–56	W1
126	August 21	Angels	5–4	**Boxberger** (2–4)	Bedrosian (5–3)	—	30,420	70–56	W2
127	August 22	Angels	5–1	**Buchholz** (7–2)	Despaigne (2–2)	—	23,584	71–56	W3
128	August 24	Mariners	3–6	Ramírez (1–2)	**Godley** (13–7)	Díaz (49)	43,867	71–57	L1
129	August 25	Mariners	3–6	Colomé (5–5)	**Diekman** (1–2)	Díaz (50)	34,968	71–58	L2
130	August 26	Mariners	5–2	**Greinke** (13–8)	Leake (8–8)	**Boxberger** (29)	37,175	72–58	W1
131	August 27	@ Giants	0–2	Stratton (9–7)	**Corbin** (10–5)	Strickland (14)	38,808	72–59	L1
132	August 28	@ Giants	0–1	Smith (2–2)	**Ziegler** (1–6)	—	37,276	72–60	L2
133	August 29	@ Giants	3–1	**Godley** (14–7)	Rodríguez (6–2)	**Boxberger** (30)	35,626	73–60	W1
134	August 30	@ Dodgers	3–1	**Ray** (4–2)	Hill (6–5)	**Boxberger** (31)	45,150	74–60	W2
135	August 31	@ Dodgers	2–3	Floro (5–3)	**Greinke** (13–9)	Jansen (33)	48,965	74–61	L1

September: 8–19 (Home: 5–10; Away: 3–9)

#	Date	Opponent	Score	Win	Loss	Save	Attendance	Record	Streak
136	September 1	@ Dodgers	2–3	Maeda (8–8)	**Bradley** (4–5)	Jansen (34)	52,394	74–62	L2
137	September 2	@ Dodgers	2–3	Jansen (1–5)	**Boxberger** (2–5)	—	48,517	74–63	L3
138	September 3	Padres	2–6	Mitchell (1–3)	**Godley** (14–8)	—	22,514	74–64	L4
139	September 4	Padres	6–0	**Ray** (5–2)	Lucchesi (7–8)	—	18,556	75–64	W1
140	September 6	Braves	6–7	Biddle (5–1)	**Boxberger** (2–6)	Brach (12)	21,903	75–65	L1
141	September 7	Braves	5–3	**Corbin** (11–5)	Gausman (9–10)	**Boxberger** (32)	31,308	76–65	W1
142	September 8	Braves	4–5	Sobotka (1–0)	**Chafin** (1–5)	Minter (13)	40,482	76–66	L1
143	September 9	Braves	5–9	Freeman (3–5)	**Boxberger** (2–7)	—	28,339	76–67	L2
144	September 10	@ Rockies	2–13	Márquez (12–9)	**Godley** (14–9)	—	25,114	76–68	L3
145	September 11	@ Rockies	6–3	**Greinke** (14–9)	Senzatela (4–6)	**Hirano** (1)	26,510	77–68	W1
146	September 12	@ Rockies	4–5	Davis (3–6)	**Hirano** (4–3)	—	31,687	77–69	L1
147	September 13	@ Rockies	3–10	Freeland (15–7)	**Koch** (5–5)	—	31,783	77–70	L2
148	September 14	@ Astros	4–2	**Ziegler** (2–6)	Rondón (2–4)	**Hirano** (2)	36,924	78–70	W1
149	September 15	@ Astros	4–10	Morton (15–3)	**Godley** (14–10)	—	38,345	78–71	L1
150	September 16	@ Astros	4–5	Verlander (16–9)	**Greinke** (14–10)	Osuna (18)	37,889	78–72	L2
151	September 17	Cubs	1–5	Hendricks (12–11)	**Corbin** (11–6)	—	27,662	78–73	L3
152	September 18	Cubs	1–9	Montgomery (5–5)	**Andriese** (3–6)	—	26,095	78–74	L4
153	September 19	Cubs	9–0	**Ray** (6–2)	Hamels (9–10)	—	25,715	79–74	W1
154	September 21	Rockies	2–6	Marquez (13–10)	**Greinke** (14–11)	—	28,833	79–75	L1
155	September 22	Rockies	1–5	Senzatela (5–6)	**Corbin** (11–7)	—	35,094	79–76	L2
156	September 23	Rockies	0–2	Freeland (16–7)	**Godley** (14–11)	Davis (41)	29,191	79–77	L3
157	September 24	Dodgers	4–7	Kershaw (9–5)	**Chafin** (1–6)	—	26,067	79–78	L4
158	September 25	Dodgers	4–3	**Boxberger** (3–7)	Maeda (8–10)	—	25,774	80–78	W1
159	September 26	Dodgers	7–2	**Greinke** (15–11)	Stripling (8–6)	—	31,149	81–78	W2
160	September 28	@ Padres	2–3 (15)	Brewer (1–0)	**Andriese** (3–7)	—	28,055	81–79	L1
161	September 29	@ Padres	5–4	**Godley** (15–11)	Nix (2–5)	**Hirano** (3)	28,024	82–79	W1
162	September 30	@ Padres	3–4	Castillo (3–3)	**Barrett** (0–1)	—	31,243	82–80	L1

Legend: = Win = Loss = Postponement
Bold = Diamondbacks team member

=== Season standings ===
==== National League West ====
NL West
Team	W	L	Pct.	GB	Home	Road
Los Angeles Dodgers	92	71	.564	—	45‍–‍37	47‍–‍34
Colorado Rockies	91	72	.558	1	47‍–‍34	44‍–‍38
Arizona Diamondbacks	82	80	.506	9½	40‍–‍41	42‍–‍39
San Francisco Giants	73	89	.451	18½	42‍–‍39	31‍–‍50
San Diego Padres	66	96	.407	25½	31‍–‍50	35‍–‍46

==== National League Wild Card ====
Division leaders
Team	W	L	Pct.
Milwaukee Brewers	96	67	.589
Los Angeles Dodgers	92	71	.564
Atlanta Braves	90	72	.556

Wild Card teams (Top 2 teams qualify for postseason)
Team	W	L	Pct.	GB
Chicago Cubs	95	68	.583	+4
Colorado Rockies	91	72	.558	—
St. Louis Cardinals	88	74	.543	2½
Pittsburgh Pirates	82	79	.509	8
Arizona Diamondbacks	82	80	.506	8½
Washington Nationals	82	80	.506	8½
Philadelphia Phillies	80	82	.494	10½
New York Mets	77	85	.475	13½
San Francisco Giants	73	89	.451	17½
Cincinnati Reds	67	95	.414	23½
San Diego Padres	66	96	.407	24½
Miami Marlins	63	98	.391	27

=== Record vs. opponents ===
2018 National League record Source: MLB Standings Grid – 2018
Team	AZ	ATL	CHC	CIN	COL	LAD	MIA	MIL	NYM	PHI	PIT	SD	SF	STL	WSH	AL
Arizona	—	3–4	3–4	3–3	8–11	11–8	6–1	1–5	2–5	4–2	6–1	12–7	8–11	3–3	2–5	10–10
Atlanta	4–3	—	3–3	3–4	2–5	2–5	14–5	3–4	13–6	12–7	5–1	4–3	3–3	4–2	10–9	8–12
Chicago	4–3	3–3	—	11–8	3–3	4–3	5–2	11–9	6–1	4–2	10–9	5–2	3–3	9–10	4–3	13–7
Cincinnati	3–3	4–3	8–11	—	2–4	6–1	2–5	6–13	3–3	3–4	5–14	3–4	4–2	7–12	1–6	10–10
Colorado	11–8	5–2	3–3	4–2	—	7–13	2–4	2–5	6–1	5–2	3–3	11–8	12–7	2–5	5–2	13–7
Los Angeles	8–11	5–2	3–4	1–6	13–7	—	2–4	4–3	4–2	3–4	5–1	14–5	10–9	3–4	5–1	12–8
Miami	1–6	5–14	2–5	5–2	4–2	4–2	—	2–5	7–12	8–11	1–4	2–5	4–3	3–3	6–13	9–11
Milwaukee	5–1	4–3	9–11	13–6	5–2	3–4	5–2	—	4–3	3–3	7–12	4–2	6–1	11–8	4–2	13–7
New York	5–2	6–13	1–6	3–3	1–6	2–4	12–7	3–4	—	11–8	3–4	4–2	4–3	3–3	11–8	8–12
Philadelphia	2–4	7–12	2–4	4–3	2–5	4–3	11–8	3–3	8–11	—	6–1	3–3	4–3	4–3	8–11	12–8
Pittsburgh	1–6	1–5	9–10	14–5	3–3	1–5	4–1	12–7	4–3	1–6	—	3–4	4–3	8–11	2–5	15–5
San Diego	7–12	3–4	2–5	4–3	8–11	5–14	5–2	2–4	2–4	3–3	4–3	—	8–11	4–3	2–4	7–13
San Francisco	11–8	3–3	3–3	2–4	7–12	9–10	3–4	1–6	3–4	3–4	3–4	11–8	—	2–5	4–2	8–12
St. Louis	3–3	2–4	10–9	12–7	5–2	4–3	3–3	8–11	3–3	3–4	11–8	3–4	5–2	—	5–2	11–9
Washington	5–2	9–10	3–4	6–1	2–5	1–5	13–6	2–4	8–11	11–8	5–2	4–2	2–4	2–5	—	9–11

The October 1 tiebreaker games were regular-season games that are included here.

== Roster ==
2018 Arizona Diamondbacks
Roster
Pitchers: 35 Matt Andriese; 33 Jake Barrett; 31 Brad Boxberger; 61 Silvino Bracho; 25 Archie Bradley; 32 Clay Buchholz; 40 Andrew Chafin; 46 Patrick Corbin; 29 Jorge de la Rosa; 48 Randall Delgado; 41 Jake Diekman; 52 Zack Godley; 21 Zack Greinke; 66 Yoshihisa Hirano; 55 Matt Koch; 65 Joey Krehbiel; 50 Yoan López; 30 T. J. McFarland; 47 Kris Medlen; 26 Shelby Miller; 38 Robbie Ray; 57 Fernando Salas; 41 Troy Scribner; 54 Jimmie Sherfy; 34 Braden Shipley; 99 Taijuan Walker; 29 Brad Ziegler	Catchers: 5 Alex Avila; 2 Jeff Mathis; 36 John Ryan Murphy; 37 Chris Stewart; Infielders: 13 Nick Ahmed; 3 Daniel Descalso; 14 Eduardo Escobar; 44 Paul Goldschmidt; 22 Jake Lamb; 10 Deven Marrero; 4 Ketel Marte; 15 Ildemaro Vargas; 53 Christian Walker	Outfielders: 19 Socrates Brito; 1 Jarrod Dyson; 9 Jon Jay; 47 Patrick Kivlehan; 45 Kristopher Negron; 16 Chris Owings; 6 David Peralta; 11 A. J. Pollock; 28 Steven Souza Jr.	Manager: 17 Torey Lovullo; Coaches: 23 Mike Butcher (pitching); 43 Mike Fetters (bullpen); 7 Robby Hammock (quality control/catching); 59 Tim Laker (assistant hitting); 18 Dave Magadan (hitting); 39 Dave McKay (first base); 12 Jerry Narron (bench); 8 Tony Perezchica (third base); 84 Humberto Quintero (bullpen catcher); 83 Mark Reed (bullpen catcher); 60 Luis Urueta (coach)

== Player stats ==
=== Batting ===
Note: G = Games played; AB = At bats; R = Runs; H = Hits; 2B = Doubles; 3B = Triples; HR = Home runs; RBI = Runs batted in; SB = Stolen bases; BB = Walks; AVG = Batting average; SLG = Slugging average

Player	G	AB	R	H	2B	3B	HR	RBI	SB	BB	AVG	SLG
Paul Goldschmidt	158	593	95	172	35	5	33	83	7	90	.290	.533
David Peralta	146	560	75	164	25	5	30	87	4	48	.293	.516
Ketel Marte	153	520	68	135	26	12	14	59	6	54	.260	.437
Nick Ahmed	153	516	61	121	33	5	16	70	5	40	.234	.411
A. J. Pollock	113	413	61	106	21	5	21	65	13	31	.257	484
Daniel Descalso	138	349	54	83	22	4	13	57	0	64	.238	.436
Jon Jay	84	289	46	68	10	5	2	22	1	14	.235	.325
Chris Owings	106	281	34	58	15	0	4	22	11	24	.206	.302
Steven Souza Jr.	72	241	21	53	15	3	5	29	6	28	.220	.369
John Ryan Murphy	87	208	19	42	9	0	9	24	0	11	.202	.375
Jake Lamb	56	207	34	46	8	0	6	31	1	26	.222	.348
Jarrod Dyson	67	206	29	39	4	2	2	12	16	27	.189	.257
Eduardo Escobar	54	198	30	53	11	0	8	21	1	18	.268	.444
Jeff Mathis	69	195	15	39	9	1	1	20	0	20	.200	.272
Alex Avila	80	194	13	32	6	0	7	20	0	37	.165	.304
Deven Marrero	49	78	11	13	1	1	0	7	3	6	.167	.205
Christian Walker	37	49	6	8	2	0	3	6	1	3	.163	.388
Socrates Brito	24	40	3	7	0	0	1	3	0	3	.175	.250
Ildemaro Vargas	14	19	2	4	0	0	1	4	1	1	.211	.368
Patrick Kivlehan	9	13	3	3	0	2	0	0	0	0	.231	.538
Kristopher Negrón	2	3	0	1	0	0	0	1	0	0	.333	.333
Chris Stewart	3	1	0	0	0	0	0	0	0	0	.000	.000
Pitcher totals	162	287	13	36	7	0	0	15	3	15	.125	.150
Team totals	162	5460	693	1283	259	50	176	658	79	560	.235	.397

=== Pitching ===
Note: W = Wins; L = Losses; ERA = Earned run average; G = Games pitched; GS = Games started; SV = Saves; IP = Innings pitched; H = Hits allowed; R = Runs allowed; ER = Earned runs allowed; BB = Walks allowed; SO = Strikeouts

Player	W	L	ERA	G	GS	SV	IP	H	R	ER	BB	SO
Zack Greinke	15	11	3.21	33	33	0	207.2	181	77	74	43	199
Patrick Corbin	11	7	3.15	33	33	0	200.0	162	70	70	48	246
Zack Godley	15	11	4.74	33	32	0	178.1	177	103	94	81	185
Robbie Ray	6	2	3.93	24	24	0	123.2	97	55	54	70	165
Clay Buchholz	7	2	2.01	16	16	0	98.1	80	25	22	22	81
Matt Koch	5	5	4.15	19	14	0	86.2	88	43	40	22	50
T. J. McFarland	2	2	2.00	47	0	1	72.0	64	18	16	22	42
Archie Bradley	4	5	3.64	76	0	3	71.2	62	30	29	20	75
Yoshihisa Hirano	4	3	2.44	75	0	3	66.1	49	22	18	23	59
Brad Boxberger	3	7	4.39	60	0	32	53.1	44	30	26	32	71
Andrew Chafin	1	6	3.10	77	0	0	49.1	41	18	17	25	53
Fernando Salas	4	4	4.50	41	0	0	40.0	40	20	20	13	30
Jorge De La Rosa	0	2	4.63	42	0	0	35.0	37	19	18	19	27
Silvino Bracho	2	0	3.19	31	0	0	31.0	25	12	11	12	34
Brad Ziegler	1	1	3.74	29	0	0	21.2	22	9	9	8	13
Matt Andriese	0	3	9.00	14	1	0	19.0	29	19	19	7	19
James Sherfy	0	0	1.65	15	0	0	16.1	8	3	3	10	17
Shelby Miller	0	4	10.69	5	4	0	16.0	24	21	19	8	19
Jake Diekman	0	1	7.53	24	0	0	14.1	18	15	12	8	18
Taijuan Walker	0	0	3.46	3	3	0	13.0	15	5	5	5	9
Randall Delgado	2	0	4.76	10	0	0	11.1	11	6	6	6	5
Yoan López	0	0	3.00	10	0	0	9.0	7	3	3	1	11
Jake Barrett	0	1	5.14	7	0	0	7.0	8	4	4	2	6
Braden Shipley	0	0	7.20	3	0	0	5.0	4	4	4	2	3
Kris Medlen	0	1	15.75	1	1	0	4.0	9	7	7	4	4
Troy Scribner	0	1	4.91	1	1	0	3.2	4	2	2	6	4
Daniel Descalso	0	0	8.10	2	0	0	3.1	4	3	3	1	2
Joey Krehbiel	0	0	0.00	2	0	0	3.0	1	0	0	2	0
Alex Avila	0	0	0.00	1	0	0	2.0	1	0	0	0	0
Jeff Mathis	0	1	9.00	1	0	0	1.0	1	1	1	0	1
Team totals	82	80	3.72	162	162	39	1463.0	1313	644	605	522	1448

== Minor league affiliations ==
Level	Team	League	Location
AAA	Reno Aces	Pacific Coast League	Reno, Nevada
AA	Jackson Generals	Southern League	Jackson, Tennessee
Advanced A	Visalia Rawhide	California League	Visalia, California
A	Kane County Cougars	Midwest League	Geneva, Illinois
Short Season A	Hillsboro Hops	Northwest League	Hillsboro, Oregon
Rookie	Missoula Osprey	Pioneer League	Missoula, Montana
Rookie	AZL D-backs	Arizona League	Scottsdale, Arizona
Rookie	DSL D-backs	Dominican Summer League	Boca Chica, Dominican Republic
