= Abiatal Avelino =

Dominican baseball player (born 1995)

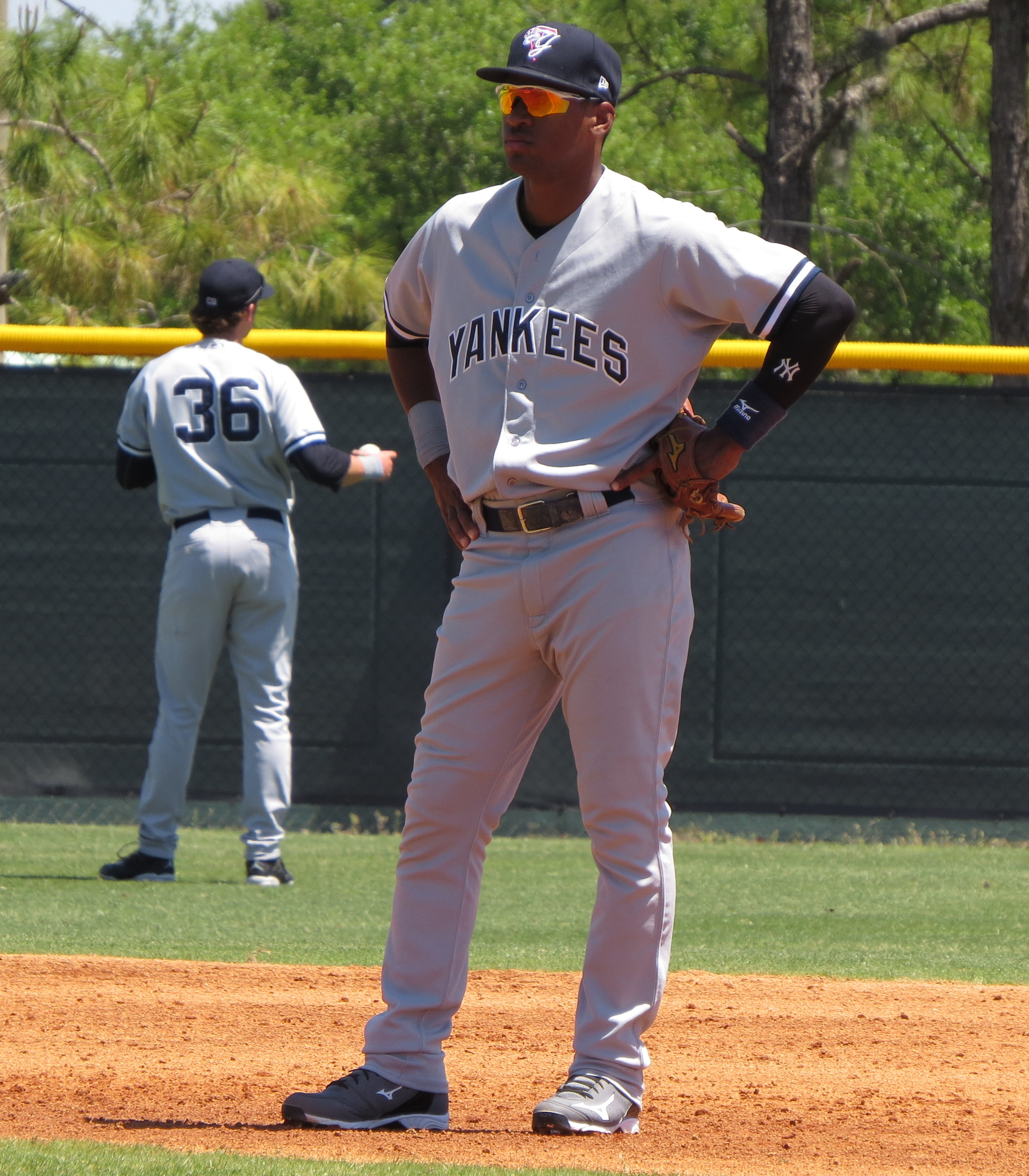
- Avelino with the Tampa Yankees
- Shortstop
- Born: February 14, 1995 (age 31); San Pedro de Macoris, Dominican Republic
- Batted: Right Threw: Right

MLB debut
- September 8, 2018, for the San Francisco Giants

Last MLB appearance
- August 26, 2019, for the San Francisco Giants

MLB statistics
- Batting average: .278
- Home runs: 0
- Runs batted in: 1
- Stats at Baseball Reference

Teams
- San Francisco Giants (2018–2019)

Abiatal Avelino (born February 14, 1995) is a Dominican former professional baseball infielder. Avelino signed with the New York Yankees as an international free agent in 2011. He played in Major League Baseball (MLB) for the San Francisco Giants.

== Professional career ==
=== New York Yankees ===
Avelino signed with the New York Yankees as an international free agent in 2011. He made his professional debut in 2012 with the DSL Yankees, hitting.302/.398/.374/.772 with 1 home run and 25 RBIs. He split the 2013 season between the Gulf Coast Yankees and the Staten Island Yankees, combining to hit.303/.381/.399/.780 with 23 RBIs, and was an MILB Yankees organization All Star.

He split the 2014 season between the GCL Yankees and the Charleston RiverDogs, hitting a combined.247/.308/.351/.659 with 2 home runs and 15 RBIs. He split the 2015 season between Charleston and the Tampa Yankees, hitting.260/.314/.334/.648 with 4 home runs, 27 RBIs, and 54 stolen bases in 488 at bats. His 2016 season was split between Tampa and the Trenton Thunder, combining to hit.260/.320/.364/.684 with 6 home runs and 48 RBIs.

He split the 2017 season between Tampa, Trenton, and the Scranton/Wilkes-Barre RailRiders, combining to hit.254/.304/.356/.660 with 3 home runs and 36 RBIs. In 2018, Avelino played for the Trenton Thunder of the Double–A Eastern League, with whom he was a mid-season All Star, and the Scranton/Wilkes-Barre RailRiders of the Triple–A International League, and Sacramento, and batted a combined .283/.329/.438 with 27 stolen bases in 477 at bats.

=== San Francisco Giants ===
On August 31, 2018, the Yankees traded Avelino and minor-league RHP Juan De Paula to the San Francisco Giants in exchange for Andrew McCutchen. He played three games for the Sacramento River Cats of the Triple-A Pacific Coast League, and was promoted to the major leagues on September 4, where he played six games for the Giants.

In 2019, Avelino played most of the season with Sacramento, with whom he batted .283/.315/.444 with 12 home runs, 17 stolen bases, and 62 RBIs in 473 at bats. He also had seven at bats for the Giants. He was designated for assignment on August 9, 2020. Avelino was released by the Giants organization on September 7.

=== Chicago Cubs ===
On November 20, 2020, Avelino signed a minor league contract with the Chicago Cubs organization where he was assigned to the Iowa Cubs.

=== Los Angeles Dodgers ===
On June 8, 2022, Avelino signed a minor league contract with the Los Angeles Dodgers organization. He played in Double-A with the Tulsa Drillers, appearing in 60 games and hitting .230/.288/.378 with seven home runs, 26 RBI, and nine stolen bases. Avelino elected free agency following the season on November 10.

=== Lexington Counter Clocks ===
On March 14, 2023, Avelino signed with the Lexington Counter Clocks of the Atlantic League of Professional Baseball. Avelino played in 15 games for the club, hitting .238/.238/.254 with six RBI and five stolen bases.

=== Hagerstown Flying Boxcars ===
On March 1, 2024, Avelino signed with the Hagerstown Flying Boxcars of the Atlantic League of Professional Baseball. In 23 games for Hagerstown, he batted .230/.256/.322 with one home run, 10 RBI, and five stolen bases. Avelino was released by the team on May 31.

=== Staten Island FerryHawks ===
On June 7, 2024, Avelino signed with the Staten Island FerryHawks of the Atlantic League of Professional Baseball. In 18 games for Staten Island, he hit .194/.267/.299 with two home runs, nine RBI, and three stolen bases. Avelino was released by the FerryHawks on July 1.

=== Kansas City Monarchs ===
On July 20, 2024, Avelino signed with the Kansas City Monarchs of the American Association of Professional Baseball. He went 2–for–3 (.333) with two RBI in three games for the Monarchs before he was released on July 29. On August 7, Avelino re–signed with Kansas City. After posting a .292/.333/.375 slash line with one home run and 11 RBI over 23 games, Avelino was released again on August 31.
