= Matt Koch =

American baseball player (born 1990)

- Pitcher
- Born: November 2, 1990 (age 35); Cherokee, Iowa, U.S.
- Batted: Left Threw: Right

Professional debut
- MLB: September 9, 2016, for the Arizona Diamondbacks
- NPB: August 22, 2020, for the Tokyo Yakult Swallows

Last appearance
- MLB: May 23, 2024, for the Colorado Rockies
- NPB: September 20, 2020, for the Tokyo Yakult Swallows

MLB statistics
- Win–loss record: 9–8
- Earned run average: 5.18
- Strikeouts: 99

NPB statistics
- Win–loss record: 0–3
- Earned run average: 7.88
- Strikeouts: 6
- Stats at Baseball Reference

Teams
- Arizona Diamondbacks (2016–2019); Tokyo Yakult Swallows (2020); Seattle Mariners (2022); Colorado Rockies (2023–2024)

Matthew David Koch (born November 2, 1990) is an American professional baseball pitcher. He played in Major League Baseball (MLB) for the Arizona Diamondbacks, Seattle Mariners, and Colorado Rockies, and in Nippon Professional Baseball (NPB) for the Tokyo Yakult Swallows.

== Career ==
=== Amateur career ===
Koch attended Washington High School in Cherokee, Iowa, and played for the school's baseball team. The Boston Red Sox selected Koch in the 37th round of the 2009 MLB draft. He did not sign and attended the University of Louisville, where he played college baseball for the Louisville Cardinals.

In 2011, he played collegiate summer baseball for the Chatham A's of the Cape Cod Baseball League and was named a league all-star.

=== New York Mets ===
Koch was drafted by the New York Mets in the third round of the 2012 MLB draft. He made his professional debut with the Low-A Brooklyn Cyclones, and recorded a 5.01 ERA in 13 games for the club. In 2013, Koch pitched for the Single-A Savannah Sand Gnats, registering a 6–4 record and 4.70 ERA with 68 strikeouts. In 2014, Koch spent the season with the High-A St. Lucie Mets, pitching to a 10–4 record and 4.64 ERA in 120.1 innings of work. He began the 2015 season with the Double-A Binghamton Mets, recording a 4–8 record and 3.46 ERA in 35 appearances.

=== Arizona Diamondbacks ===
On August 30, 2015, the Mets traded Koch and Miller Diaz to the Arizona Diamondbacks in exchange for Addison Reed. The Diamondbacks added him to their 40-man roster after the season.

Koch was promoted to the Major Leagues for September call ups in 2016. In 7 games for the D'Backs, he was 1–1 with 1 save. The following season he pitched the whole season with the Triple–A Reno Aces.

In 2018, Koch began the season in Triple–A, but after an injury to the Diamondbacks rotation, Koch was called up. In his first 6 starts, he was 2–1 with an ERA under 3 but struggled afterwards, leading to his demotion to Triple–A with the return of Shelby Miller. On June 20, he was demoted to Triple–A for a second time. On the season, Koch finished with a 5–5 record with an ERA of 4.15 in 19 games, 14 starts.

On April 28, 2019, Koch was designated for assignment by the Diamondbacks after recording a 9.15 ERA and 3.92 K/9 in 20 innings pitched. On May 4, Koch was sent outright to Reno after clearing waivers. He finished the year in Reno, recording a 5–10 record and 7.38 ERA with 81 strikeouts over 21 games (17 starts). Koch elected free agency following the season on November 4.

=== Tokyo Yakult Swallows ===
On December 13, 2019, Koch signed a one-year deal with the Tokyo Yakult Swallows of Nippon Professional Baseball (NPB). On January 31, 2020, he held press conference with Gabriel Ynoa and Alcides Escobar. On August 22, 2020, Koch made his NPB debut. Koch recorded an 0–3 record and 7.88 ERA with 6 strikeouts in 7 games for the Swallows. On December 2, 2020, he became a free agent.

=== Cleveland Indians ===
On April 23, 2021, Koch signed a minor league contract with the Cleveland Indians organization. He elected free agency on November 7, 2021.

=== Seattle Mariners ===
On March 10, 2022, Koch signed a minor league contract with the Seattle Mariners. He had his contract selected from Triple-A on April 13, 2022. He was designated for assignment on April 29, 2022. On May 5, he cleared waivers and was sent outright to the Triple-A Tacoma Rainiers. On October 13, Koch elected free agency.

=== Colorado Rockies ===
On November 29, 2022, Koch signed a minor league contract with the Colorado Rockies. He began the 2023 season with the Triple–A Albuquerque Isotopes, where he made 29 appearances and struggled to a 7.27 ERA with 34 strikeouts and 2 saves in 34 2/3 innings pitched. On June 27, 2023, the Rockies selected Koch's contract, adding him to the major league roster. He made a career–high 39 appearances for Colorado, recording a 5.12 ERA with 27 strikeouts in 38 2/3 innings pitched. Following the season on October 18, Koch was removed from the 40–man roster and sent outright to Triple–A Albuquerque. On October 20, Koch elected free agency.

On December 6, 2023, Koch re–signed with the Rockies on a new minor league contract. In 18 games for Albuquerque, he posted a 2.53 ERA with 15 strikeouts across 21 1/3 innings. On May 19, 2024, the Rockies selected Koch's contract, adding him to their active roster. In two appearances for Colorado, he allowed four runs (three earned) on three hits in 1/3 of an inning. On May 24, the Rockies designated Koch for assignment. He cleared waivers and was sent outright to Albuquerque on May 27. Koch elected free agency on September 30.
