= Chris Shaw (baseball) =

American baseball player (born 1993)

- Left fielder
- Born: October 20, 1993 (age 33); Stoneham, Massachusetts, U.S.
- Batted: Left Threw: Right

MLB debut
- August 31, 2018, for the San Francisco Giants

Last MLB appearance
- September 27, 2019, for the San Francisco Giants

MLB statistics
- Batting average: .153
- Home runs: 1
- Runs batted in: 7
- Stats at Baseball Reference

Teams
- San Francisco Giants (2018–2019)

Christopher James Shaw (born October 20, 1993) is an American former professional baseball left fielder. He played in Major League Baseball (MLB) for the San Francisco Giants.

== Amateur career ==
Shaw graduated from Lexington High School in Lexington, Massachusetts. He was drafted by the New York Mets in the 26th round of the 2012 MLB draft, but he did not sign.

Instead he enrolled at Boston College where he played college baseball, mostly as a right fielder. In his junior year he batted .319/.411/.611. In 2014, he played collegiate summer baseball with the Chatham Anglers of the Cape Cod Baseball League.

== Professional career ==
=== San Francisco Giants ===
Shaw was drafted by the San Francisco Giants in the first round of the 2015 MLB draft, signed for a $1.5 million signing bonus, and was assigned to the Salem-Keizer Volcanoes, where as a first baseman he batted .287 with 12 home runs (leading the Northwest League) and 30 RBIs in 64 games. In 2016, Shaw began the season with the San Jose Giants, and was later promoted to the Richmond Flying Squirrels; in 132 games between the two teams, he posted a combined .267 batting average with 21 home runs and 85 RBIs and 125 strikeouts in 502 at bats.

He spent 2017 as a left fielder with both Richmond and the Sacramento River Cats, slashing a combined .292/.346/.525 with 24 home runs (leading the Giants organization), 79 RBIs, and 132 strikeouts in 469 at bats and an .871 OPS in 125 total games between the two clubs. He began 2018 with Sacramento.

In 2018 the Triple-A Sacramento River Cats he batted .259/.308/.505 with 24 home runs (8th in the Pacific Coast League, and leading the Giants organization) and 65 RBIs and 144 strikeouts (6th) in 394 at bats. Shaw was called up to the majors for the first time on August 31, 2018, and made his debut that day. On September 3, he hit his first major league home run against the Colorado Rockies. Shaw ended up batting .185 in 22 games, with one home run and 7 runs batted in. He struck out 23 times in 62 plate appearances.

In 2019, the Giants organization kept Shaw on the 40-man roster but demoted him back to Double-A Richmond to work on his plate discipline. On May 30, 2019, after 45 games with Richmond, with whom he batted .288/.368/.500 with 25 runs, 7 home runs and 24 RBIs in 160 at bats, Shaw was promoted to the Triple-A Sacramento River Cats, with whom he batted .298/.355/.592 with 20 home runs and 70 RBIs in 282 at bats. On September 1, 2019, the Giants promoted Shaw to the major leagues, where he had 18 at bats.

On November 20, 2020, Shaw was designated for assignment.

=== Baltimore Orioles ===
On November 25, 2020, Shaw was claimed off waivers by the Baltimore Orioles. On January 26, 2021, Shaw was designated for assignment by the Orioles following the signing of Freddy Galvis. On February 1, Shaw was outrighted. In 20 games split between the High-A Aberdeen Ironbirds and Triple-A Norfolk Tides, Shaw struggled to an .067/.243/.150 batting line with 1 home run and 6 RBI. On August 2, Shaw was released by the Orioles organization.

=== Long Island Ducks ===
On August 17, 2021, Shaw signed with the Long Island Ducks of the Atlantic League of Professional Baseball. In 46 games he hit .219/.340/.348 with 5 home runs and 18 RBIs. He became a free agent following the season.

=== Wild Health Genomes ===
On March 23, 2022, Shaw's rights were acquired by the Wild Health Genomes in a trade that sent the Long Island Ducks the second overall pick in the annual player draft. Shaw played in 110 games for the Genomes in 2022, slashing .264/.401/.459 with 17 home runs and 72 RBI. He became a free agent following the season.

=== Chicago White Sox ===
On February 10, 2023, Shaw signed a minor league contract with the Chicago White Sox organization. In 57 games split between the Double–A Birmingham Barons and Triple–A Charlotte Knights, he batted .197/.332/.425 with 12 home runs and 28 RBI. Shaw was released by the White Sox organization on August 2.

=== Spire City Ghost Hounds ===
On August 11, 2023, Shaw signed with the Spire City Ghost Hounds of the Atlantic League of Professional Baseball. In 22 games for the Ghost Hounds, he hit .197/.307/.382 with 3 home runs and 10 RBI. On September 15, Shaw was released by Spire City.
