= Roberto Gómez (baseball) =

Dominican baseball player (1989–2024)

- Pitcher
- Born: August 3, 1989; Santiago, Dominican Republic
- Died: December 8, 2024 (aged 35); Santiago, Dominican Republic
- Batted: Right Threw: Right

MLB debut
- September 5, 2017, for the San Francisco Giants

Last MLB appearance
- April 28, 2018, for the San Francisco Giants

MLB statistics
- Win–loss record: 1–0
- Earned run average: 7.98
- Strikeouts: 14

Teams
- San Francisco Giants (2017–2018)

Roberto Ezequiel Gómez Castillo (August 3, 1989 – December 8, 2024) was a Dominican professional baseball pitcher. He played for the San Francisco Giants of Major League Baseball (MLB) from 2017 to 2018.

== Career ==
=== Tampa Bay Rays ===
Gómez made his professional debut with the Tampa Bay Rays organization in 2010 for the Dominican Summer League Rays. In 2011, he played for the DSL Rays, rookie–level Gulf Coast League Rays, and Low–A Hudson Valley Renegades. In 2012, Gómez played for the Single–A Bowling Green Hot Rods and in 2013 he played for the High–A Charlotte Stone Crabs. In 2014, Gómez split the year between Charlotte and the Double–A Montgomery Biscuits. Gómez was released by the Rays organization on October 8, 2014.

=== San Francisco Giants ===
Gómez did not pitch in 2015 or 2016 after undergoing Tommy John surgery. On November 23, 2016, Gómez signed a minor league contract with the San Francisco Giants and pitched for the Sacramento River Cats of the Triple–A Pacific Coast League. The Giants promoted him to the major leagues for the first time on September 5, 2017. He made his major league debut that day.

Gómez' lone win came on April 7, 2018, over the Los Angeles Dodgers. Although he surrendered a run in the top of the 14th inning, Andrew McCutchen's 3-run home run in the bottom of the inning won the game for the Giants.

Gómez was released by the Giants organization on July 5, 2018. He re–signed with San Francisco on a minor league contract on July 9. In 18 games split between Sacramento and the rookie–level Arizona League Giants, he accumulated a 3.91 ERA with 18 strikeouts and 2 saves across 23 innings pitched. Gómez elected free agency following the season on November 2.

On November 26, 2018, Gómez signed a minor league contract with the Pittsburgh Pirates organization. On February 19, 2019, Gómez’s contract was voided due to medical concerns in his physical exam.

== Death ==
Gómez died in a traffic collision in Santiago, Dominican Republic, on December 8, 2024, at the age of 35.
