= Ray Black =

American baseball player (born 1990)

- Pitcher
- Born: June 26, 1990 (age 36); Wilkes-Barre, Pennsylvania, U.S.
- Batted: Right Threw: Right

MLB debut
- July 8, 2018, for the San Francisco Giants

Last appearance
- September 24, 2020, for the Milwaukee Brewers

MLB statistics
- Win–loss record: 2–3
- Earned run average: 5.53
- Strikeouts: 54
- Stats at Baseball Reference

Teams
- San Francisco Giants (2018–2019); Milwaukee Brewers (2019–2020)

Raymond Anthony Black (born June 26, 1990) is an American former professional baseball pitcher. He played in Major League Baseball (MLB) for the San Francisco Giants and Milwaukee Brewers.

== Early life ==
Black had Tommy John surgery during his senior year in high school.

== College career ==
He recovered from the surgery and played college baseball at the University of Pittsburgh for the Panthers from 2009 to 2011. He appeared in 30 games with Pittsburgh, finishing with a 10.95 earned run average (ERA) with 41 strikeouts and 41 walks in 37 innings.

== Professional career ==
=== San Francisco Giants ===
==== Minor leagues ====
Despite his college numbers, Black was drafted by the San Francisco Giants in the seventh round of the 2011 Major League Baseball draft. He signed with the Giants rather than return to Pittsburgh. He did not pitch in 2011 and before the 2012 season, Black suffered a torn labrum in his right shoulder. The injury would cause him to miss both 2012 and 2013 while he recovered. Black finally made his professional debut in 2014 with the Augusta GreenJackets and in August, he was promoted to the San Jose Giants. He finished the year with a 3.57 ERA and 71 strikeouts in 35 1/3 innings. After the season, the Giants assigned him to the Scottsdale Scorpions of the Arizona Fall League. In 2015, he pitched for the San Jose Giants where he was 2–1 with a 2.88 ERA and 1.52 WHIP in 25 innings, and in 2016, he played with the Richmond Flying Squirrels where he compiled a 1–4 record and 4.88 ERA in 31.1 innings pitched out of the bullpen. He spent most of 2017 rehabbing an elbow injury with his only action of the season being three rehab appearances in August. He began 2018 with Richmond.

==== Major leagues ====
Black was called up to the majors for the first time on July 8, 2018. In 26 appearances during his rookie campaign, Black registered a 2–2 record and 6.17 ERA with 33 strikeouts in 23 1/3 innings pitched.

=== Milwaukee Brewers ===
On July 31, 2019, the Giants traded Black and Drew Pomeranz to the Milwaukee Brewers for Mauricio Dubón. Between San Francisco and Milwaukee in 2019, Black pitched to a combined 5.06 ERA with 18 strikeouts in 16.0 innings across 17 appearances. Black began the 2020 season on the injured list with a shoulder strain, and spent most of the season on the IL. He was activated in September and managed to throw 3 innings of 1 run ball in 3 appearances.

On March 30, 2021, Black was outrighted off of the Brewers' 40-man roster. He did not appear for the organization in 2021 and was placed on the restricted list on August 31.

Black has since retired from professional baseball and is a trainer for RailRiders University winter camps.
