= Andrew Suárez =

American baseball player (born 1992)

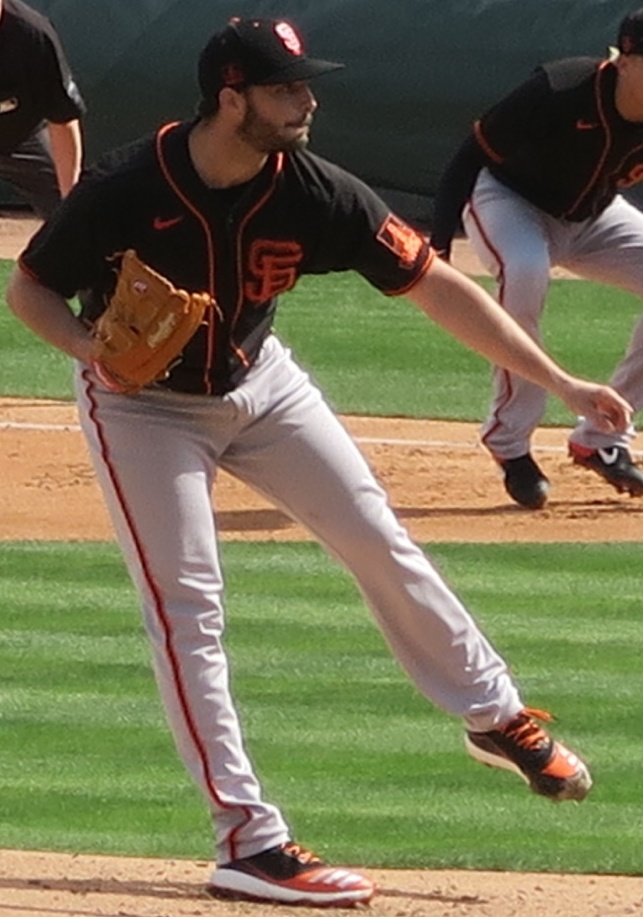
- Suárez with the San Francisco Giants in 2020
- Pitcher
- Born: September 11, 1992 (age 34); Miami, Florida, U.S.
- Batted: Left Threw: Left

Professional debut
- MLB: April 11, 2018, for the San Francisco Giants
- KBO: April 6, 2021, for the LG Twins
- NPB: May 12, 2022, for the Tokyo Yakult Swallows

Last appearance
- KBO: October 27, 2021, for the LG Twins
- NPB: August 9, 2022, for the Tokyo Yakult Swallows
- MLB: September 29, 2023, for the St. Louis Cardinals

MLB statistics (through 2023 season)
- Win–loss record: 7–15
- Earned run average: 4.96
- Strikeouts: 177

KBO statistics (through 2021 season)
- Win–loss record: 10–2
- Earned run average: 2.18
- Strikeouts: 126

NPB statistics (through 2022 season)
- Win–loss record: 0–0
- Earned run average: 6.23
- Strikeouts: 16
- Stats at Baseball Reference

Teams
- San Francisco Giants (2018–2020); LG Twins (2021); Tokyo Yakult Swallows (2022); St. Louis Cardinals (2023)

Andrew José Suárez (born September 11, 1992) is an American former professional baseball pitcher. He has previously played in Major League Baseball (MLB) for the San Francisco Giants and St. Louis Cardinals, in the KBO League for the LG Twins, and in Nippon Professional Baseball (NPB) for the Tokyo Yakult Swallows. The Giants selected Suárez in the second round of the 2015 MLB draft.

== Early life ==
Andrew José Suárez was born on September 11, 1992, in Miami, Florida. He attended Christopher Columbus High School in Miami. He is of Cuban descent.

In 2010, he had a 5–1 win–loss record with a 1.51 earned run average (ERA), and was named First Team All-Dade County and FHSAA Class 6-A Pitcher of the Year. In 2011 he was 5–3 with a 1.65 ERA and 58 strikeouts in 34 innings pitched, and was All-Dade County First Team and an AFLAC All-American.

== College career ==
He enrolled at the University of Miami to play college baseball for the Miami Hurricanes baseball team. As a Hurricane, Suárez became a top prospect. The Washington Nationals selected Suárez in the second round, with the 57th overall selection, of the 2014 Major League Baseball draft.

He chose to return to the University of Miami for his senior year, in order to earn his degree and attempt to improve his draft status for 2015.

== Professional career ==
=== Drafts and minor leagues ===
The Toronto Blue Jays selected Suárez in the ninth round of the 2011 MLB draft, but he did not sign. The San Francisco Giants selected Suárez in the second round, with the 61st overall selection, of the 2015 MLB draft. Suárez signed with the Giants for a signing bonus of $1,010,100, and made three appearances with the Arizona Giants of the rookie-level Arizona League before he was promoted to the Salem-Keizer Volcanoes of the Low–A Northwest League. In August, the Giants promoted Suárez to the San Jose Giants of the High–A California League. In 39.1 total innings pitched between the three teams, he posted a 2–0 record and 1.60 ERA.

Suárez began the 2016 season in San Jose, and was promoted to the Richmond Flying Squirrels of the Double–A Eastern League; he finished the season with a combined 9–8 record and 3.63 ERA in 24 total games started between both teams. In 2017, he started the season with Richmond and was promoted to the Sacramento River Cats of the Triple–A Pacific Coast League. In 26 total games (24 starts) between Richmond and Sacramento, Suárez pitched to a 10–10 record and 3.30 ERA with a 1.34 WHIP.

The Giants invited Suárez to spring training as a non-roster player in 2018.

=== San Francisco Giants (2018–2020) ===
The Giants promoted Suárez to the major leagues on April 11, 2018, and he made his debut that same night at AT&T Park against the Arizona Diamondbacks. He started the game and pitched 5.1 innings, giving up four earned runs on four hits along with striking out seven and walking none; he received a loss as Arizona defeated the Giants 7–3. In 2018 with Sacramento and San Jose he was 2–0 with a 1.16 ERA in four starts. In 2018 with the Giants he was 7–13 with a 4.49 ERA, as in 29 starts he pitched 160.1 innings.

In 2019 with Sacramento he was 7–6 with a 5.73 ERA in 18 games (15 starts) in which he pitched 88 innings. That season with the Giants he was 0–2 with a 5.79 ERA, as in 21 games (2 starts) he pitched 32.2 innings.

=== LG Twins (2021) ===
On January 4, 2021, the Giants sold Suárez's rights to the LG Twins of the KBO League. That same day, he signed a one-year $600,000 deal with the Twins. Suárez made 23 appearances for the Twins, posting a 2.18 ERA and 126 strikeouts. He became a free agent following the season.

=== Tokyo Yakult Swallows (2022) ===
On December 20, 2021, Suárez signed with the Tokyo Yakult Swallows of Nippon Professional Baseball. In 2022, Suárez made 6 appearances for the Swallows, struggling to 6.23 ERA with 16 strikeouts in 21.2 innings pitched. He became a free agent after the 2022 season.

=== St. Louis Cardinals (2023) ===
On January 27, 2023, Suárez signed a minor league contract with the St. Louis Cardinals organization. In 28 games for the Triple–A Memphis Redbirds, he recorded a 4.08 ERA with 69 strikeouts in 64.0 innings of work. On July 24, the Cardinals selected Suárez's contract, adding him to the major league roster. In 13 games for St. Louis, he struggled a 7.16 ERA with 17 strikeouts across 27 2/3 innings of work. Following the season on October 26, Suárez was removed from the 40–man roster and sent outright to Triple–A Memphis. However, Suárez subsequently rejected the assignment and elected free agency.

=== Baltimore Orioles ===
On January 30, 2024, Suárez signed a minor league contract with the Baltimore Orioles. In 10 games for the Triple–A Norfolk Tides, he recorded a 5.93 ERA with 12 strikeouts across 13 2/3 innings pitched. On May 15, Suárez was released by the Orioles organization.
