= Patrick Corbin =

American baseball player (born 1989)

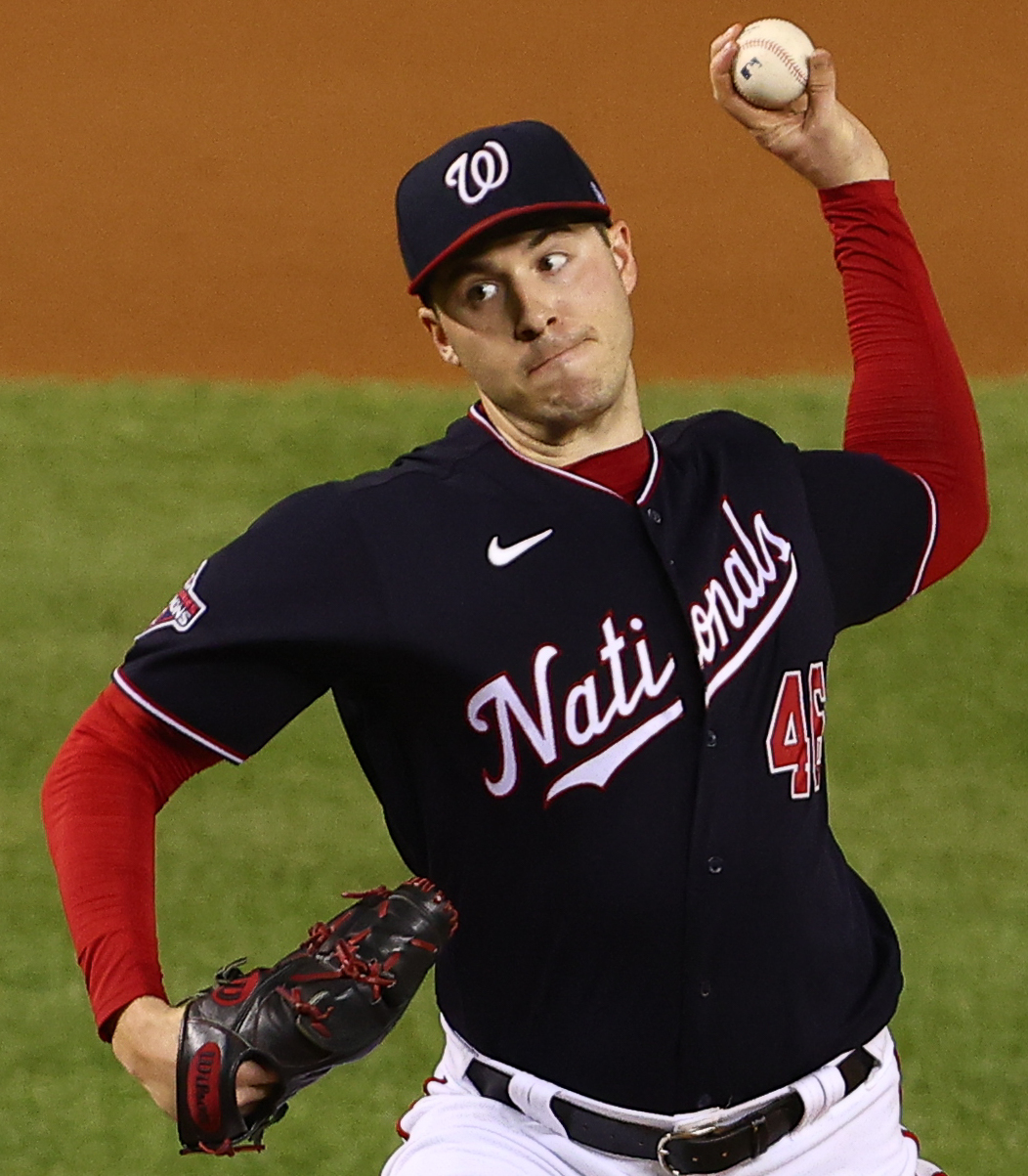
- Corbin with the Washington Nationals in 2020

Free agent
- Pitcher
- Born: July 19, 1989 (age 37); Clay, New York, U.S.
- Bats: Left Throws: Left

MLB debut
- April 30, 2012, for the Arizona Diamondbacks

MLB statistics (through 2026 season)
- Win–loss record: 113–146
- Earned run average: 4.54
- Strikeouts: 1,923
- Stats at Baseball Reference

Teams
- Arizona Diamondbacks (2012–2018); Washington Nationals (2019–2024); Texas Rangers (2025); Toronto Blue Jays (2026)

Career highlights and awards
- 2× All-Star (2013, 2018); World Series champion (2019)

Patrick Alan Corbin (born July 19, 1989) is an American professional baseball pitcher who is a free agent. He has played in Major League Baseball (MLB) for the Arizona Diamondbacks, Washington Nationals, Texas Rangers, and Toronto Blue Jays. He won the 2019 World Series with the Nationals, recording the win in Game 7.

At Cicero – North Syracuse High School, Corbin did not pitch for his high school's baseball team until his junior season. He played college baseball at Mohawk Valley Community College and Chipola College. The Los Angeles Angels of Anaheim chose Corbin in the second round of the 2009 MLB draft, and traded him to the Diamondbacks in 2010 as part of a package for Dan Haren.

Corbin made his MLB debut with the Diamondbacks in 2012 and was named an All-Star in 2013. He missed the 2014 season due to an injury to the ulnar collateral ligament in his pitching elbow. Corbin returned to the Diamondbacks in 2015, but struggled and was removed from the starting rotation in 2016. After returning to the rotation in 2017, he started for the Diamondbacks on Opening Day in 2018. Corbin was named an All-Star for the second time in his career in 2018 before joining the Washington Nationals for the 2019 season.

== Early life ==
Patrick Alan Corbin was born on July 19, 1989, in Clay, New York. His father, Dan Sr., worked as a driver for a sausage company, while his mother, Patty, works as a nurse at a rehabilitation center for the elderly.

Corbin's father built a basketball court in his backyard for his children. As a child, Corbin identified basketball as his favorite sport. He played Pop Warner football, basketball in the Catholic Youth Organization, and Little League baseball. For baseball, Corbin was a fan of the New York Yankees.

Corbin attended Cicero–North Syracuse High School (C-NS) in Cicero, New York. His father suggested that he sign up for the school's baseball team during his freshman year, but Corbin declined, preferring to play with his friends. However, he did play for the basketball and football teams. His friends on the basketball team convinced him to try out for the baseball team in his junior year, and with little training, he was able to throw over 80 miles per hour (130 km/h).

In 2007, his senior season at C-NS, Corbin had an 8–0 win–loss record, allowing only 33 hits and 16 runs while striking out 76 batters in 47 innings pitched. C-NS became the top-ranked team in the state of New York, and Corbin was named to the All-League team and first team All-Central New York. He graduated from C-NS with a record of 14–0 and 139 strikeouts.

For the C-NS basketball team, Corbin broke the school's record for most three-point field goals in a single game. He was named to the All Section Basketball team after completing his senior season.

== College career ==
Corbin's grades at C-NS were not good enough for him to enroll at a four-year college that would allow him to play college baseball. As a result, Corbin enrolled at Mohawk Valley Community College, a community college in Utica, New York, for his freshman year. At Mohawk, Corbin played baseball and basketball. Scouts from two teams attempted to sign Corbin as an undrafted free agent for a $75,000 signing bonus. Though Corbin's father wanted his son to sign, Corbin's coach suggested they wait another season. After the season, he joined a travel baseball team, where scouts took notice of Corbin after recording his fastball above 90 miles per hour (140 km/h). In a tournament in Georgia, Corbin opposed a team led by Zack Wheeler. Corbin allowed only one hit in a shutout.

Corbin transferred to Chipola College in Marianna, Florida, also a junior college, for his sophomore year, so he could play baseball throughout the year in the warmer weather. At Chipola, Corbin stopped playing basketball, focusing exclusively on baseball. While training, Corbin added 15 to 20 pounds (6.8 to 9.1 kg). Competing for the Chipola Indians, who play in the Panhandle Conference of the Florida State College Activities Association (FSCAA), a member of the National Junior College Athletic Association (NJCAA) Region 8, Corbin pitched to a 5–2 record with a 4.32 earned run average (ERA) and 86 strikeouts in 74 1/3 innings pitched. He was named to the Panhandle Conference's All-Conference first team, and was voted the league's fourth-best player. Chipola reached the FJCAA/NJCAA Gulf District Tournament, but lost to Santa Fe College in the championship game. Corbin had a 1–0 record and a 2.77 ERA in 13 innings pitched during the tournament, resulting in his being named to the All-Tournament team.

Following the 2009 season, Corbin signed a letter of intent with the University of Southern Mississippi. He planned to transfer to Southern Miss in order to continue his college baseball career with the Southern Miss Golden Eagles, competing in the National Collegiate Athletic Association's Division I.

== Professional career ==
=== Draft and minor leagues ===
Scouts from every Major League Baseball (MLB) team evaluated Corbin prior to the 2009 MLB draft, including Tom Kotchman of the Los Angeles Angels of Anaheim, a friend of Chipola's head coach. With Kotchman's recommendation, the Angels drafted Corbin in the second round of the draft, with the 80th overall selection. He was the first junior college player selected in the draft. On the day of the draft, Corbin played basketball with his roommate.

Corbin signed with the Angels, receiving a $450,000 signing bonus, forgoing his commitment to Southern Miss. Corbin pitched for the Orem Owlz of the Rookie-level Pioneer League in 2009, where Kotchman served as his manager. Corbin struggled in his first professional experience. In his first six appearances, five of them starts, he allowed 23 hits and 12 earned runs in 17 1/3 innings, giving him a 6.23 ERA. Corbin later related that he attempted to strike out too many batters while pitching for Orem.

Baseball America ranked Corbin the Angels' 12th best prospect prior to the 2010 season, projecting him as a mid-rotation starting pitcher. Corbin altered his approach, as he sought to pitch to contact. He began the 2010 season with the Cedar Rapids Kernels of the Class A Midwest League. Corbin had an 8–0 record and 3.86 ERA, allowing 25 earned runs in 58 1/3 innings in nine starts for Cedar Rapids. He struck out 70 batters while allowing 78 hits and 20 walks. During the season, the Angels promoted Corbin to the Rancho Cucamonga Quakes of the Class A-Advanced California League. With Rancho Cucamonga, Corbin had a 5–3 record and 3.88 ERA, allowing 26 earned runs in 60 1/3 innings in 11 starts. Combined, Corbin had a 3.87 ERA, 106 strikeouts, and 28 walks in 118 2/3 innings pitched with Cedar Rapids and Rancho Cucamonga.

At the trade deadline, Corbin was traded to the Diamondbacks with pitchers Joe Saunders, Rafael Rodríguez, and Tyler Skaggs for Dan Haren. The Diamondbacks assigned Corbin to the Visalia Rawhide of the California League. Corbin pitched to a 1.38 ERA in 26 innings with Visalia. In 2011, while pitching for the Double-A Mobile Bay Bears, he set a franchise record with 27 1/3 consecutive scoreless innings. He finished the season with a 9–8 win–loss record and 142 strikeouts in 160 1/3 innings pitched. His strikeout total led the Southern League, and Mobile won the league championship.

The Diamondbacks invited Corbin to spring training in 2012, where he pitched to a 0.57 earned run average. Corbin began the 2012 season with Mobile, pitching to a 2–0 record and 1.67 ERA in four starts.

=== Arizona Diamondbacks (2012–2018) ===
==== 2012: Major league debut ====
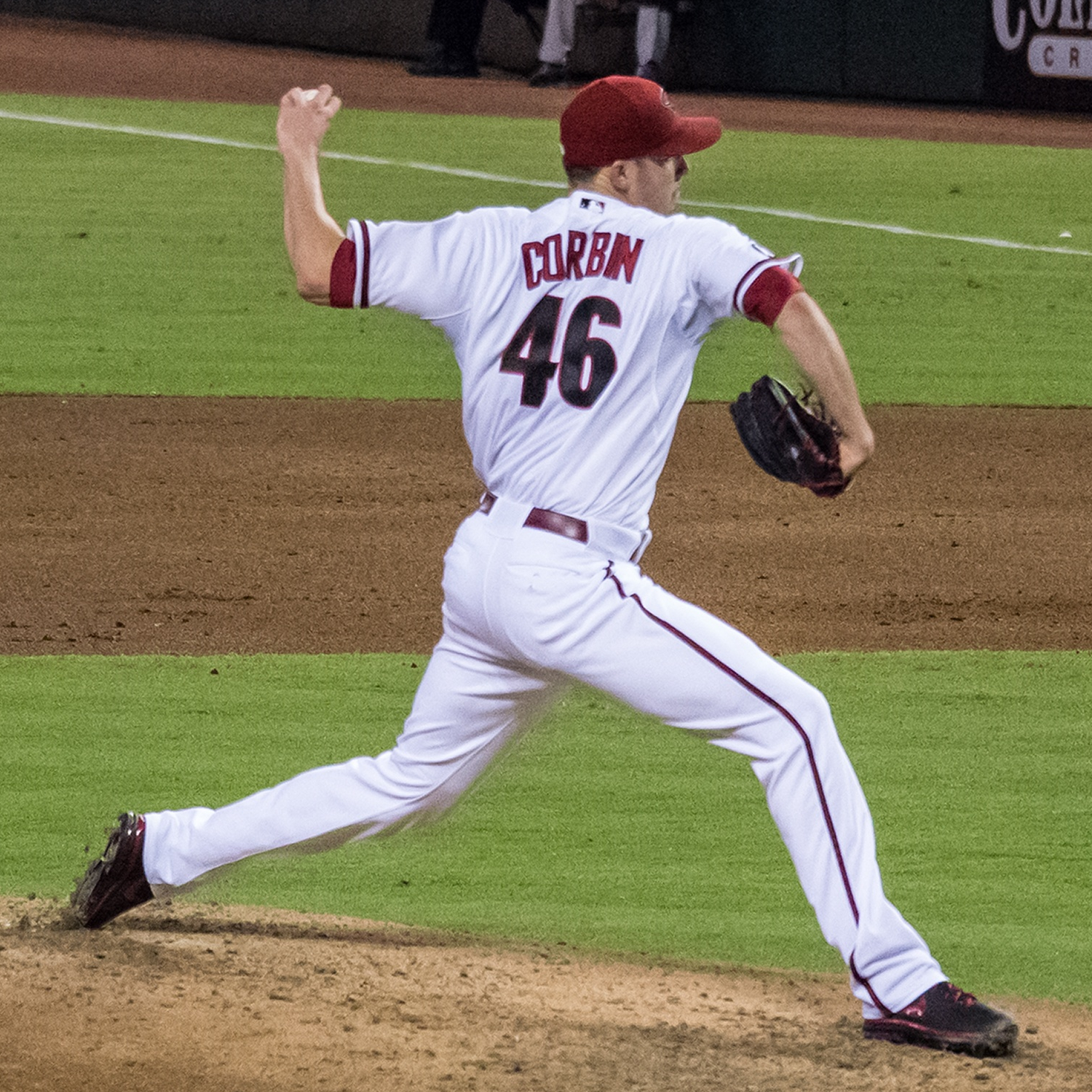
Corbin pitching for the Arizona Diamondbacks in 2013

On April 30, 2012, the Diamondbacks promoted Corbin to the major leagues to start in place of Josh Collmenter, who was moved to the bullpen. Joe Martinez was optioned to the Reno Aces of the Class AAA Pacific Coast League to make room for Corbin on the roster. Corbin allowed three runs in 5 2/3 innings in his MLB debut against the Miami Marlins, picking up the win. Corbin also had two sacrifice bunts and scored a run in the victory. After pitching to a 2–3 record and a 5.27 ERA in five starts, the Diamondbacks optioned Corbin to Reno on May 22, as Daniel Hudson was set to return to the Diamondbacks from the disabled list. Hudson suffered an elbow injury in June, and the Diamondbacks recalled Corbin as a long reliever. The Diamondbacks again optioned Corbin to Reno in July so that he could continue to work as a starting pitcher when they activated Saunders off of the disabled list. The Diamondbacks recalled Corbin on August 1, displacing Josh Collmenter in the rotation. In 107 innings with the Diamondbacks, Corbin pitched to a 6–8 record and 4.54 ERA.

==== 2013: All Star ====
During the 2012–13 offseason, Corbin gained 10 pounds (4.5 kg) and added 2 miles per hour (3.2 km/h) to his fastball. Corbin made the Diamondbacks' Opening Day starting rotation in 2013. He won the National League (NL) Pitcher of the Month Award for May 2013, after he pitched to a 5–0 record and 1.53 ERA in five games started. Corbin was named an All-Star, as he had an 11–1 record with a 2.35 ERA, which was the third best in the NL at the All-Star break. Corbin was the eighth youngest player named an All-Star. In the 2013 MLB All-Star Game, Corbin received the loss after allowing the game's first run in the fourth inning. He finished the season with a 3.41 ERA.

==== 2014–16: injuries and struggles ====
During spring training in 2014, Diamondbacks manager Kirk Gibson decided that Corbin would start on Opening Day. However, Corbin felt arm tightness during a spring training start. An MRI revealed damage to his ulnar collateral ligament of the elbow. He underwent Tommy John surgery, and missed the entire 2014 season. The Diamondbacks placed Corbin on the 15-day disabled list on March 30, and transferred him to the 60-day disabled list on April 4, in order to open a roster spot for Roger Kieschnick, who they claimed off waivers.

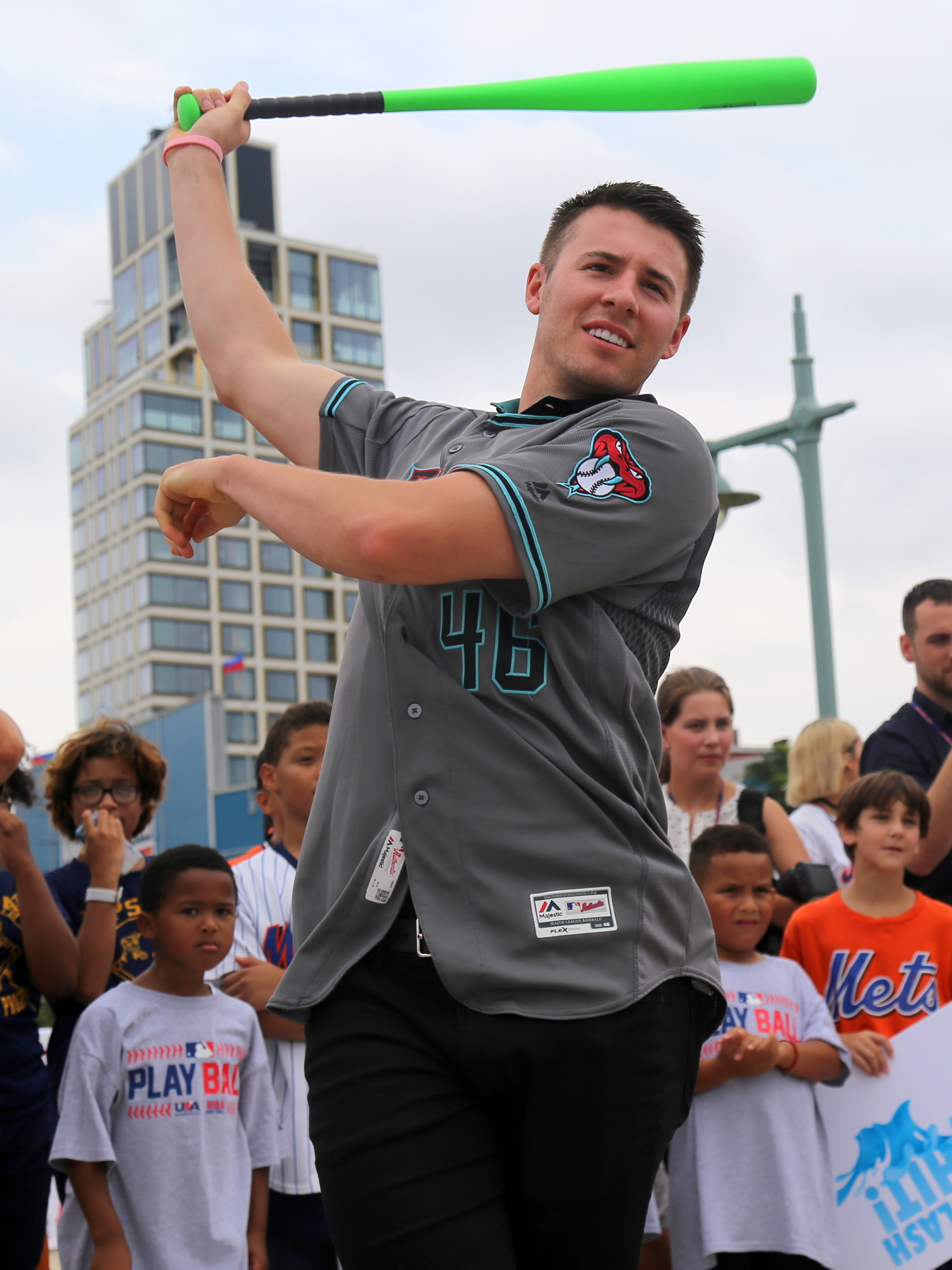
Corbin in 2016

Corbin returned to the Diamondbacks on July 4, 2015. He made 16 starts for the Diamondbacks, pitching to a 6–5 record and a 3.60 ERA. Eligible for salary arbitration for the first time, Corbin and the Diamondbacks agreed to a $2.525 million salary for the 2016 season.

In 2016, Corbin pitched to a 4–12 record and a 5.58 ERA in 24 starts through mid-August, with a 7.68 ERA over his last nine starts. The Diamondbacks then demoted Corbin to work as a relief pitcher. He had a 2.70 ERA in 23 1/3 innings as a relief pitcher, including 13 consecutive innings without allowing a run to end the year.

==== 2017–2018: rotation regular ====
In 2017, Corbin and the Diamondbacks agreed to a $3.95 million salary. Corbin returned to the starting rotation. He finished the 2017 season with a 4.03 ERA in 189 2/3 innings pitched; his ERA during the final three months of the season was 2.90. Though the Diamondbacks made it to the 2017 National League Division Series, Corbin did not appear. Torey Lovullo, the team's manager, had decided Corbin would start Game 4, but the Diamondbacks were eliminated in three games.

Corbin and the Diamondbacks agreed to a $7.5 million salary for 2018. Corbin started for the Diamondbacks on Opening Day in 2018. On April 17, against the San Francisco Giants, he threw 7 2/3 no-hit innings in a complete game shutout. He made the 2018 Major League Baseball All-Star Game, after pitching to a 6–3 record and a 3.05 ERA with 140 strikeouts in 112 innings.

Corbin finished the season 11–7 in 200 innings pitched across 33 starts. He had a 3.15 ERA and 246 strikeouts, which were both career bests. Corbin had the lowest zone percentage of all major league pitchers, with only 34.4% of his pitches being in the strike zone. He became a free agent after the season.

=== Washington Nationals (2019–2024) ===
==== 2019: World Series winner ====
On December 7, 2018, the Washington Nationals announced a six-year deal with Corbin worth $140 million.

On July 2, 2019, Corbin chose to wear number 45 in his start against the Miami Marlins to honor Tyler Skaggs, who died the day before. In 2019, he was 14–7 with a 3.25 ERA (8th in the NL) in 33 starts, in which he struck out 238 batters in 202 innings.

In the 2019 postseason, the Nationals used Corbin as both a starter and a reliever. He started three games and entered from the bullpen in five. He started Game 1 of the NLDS against the Los Angeles Dodgers and pitched six innings, surrendering only one earned run, but recording the loss since the Nationals did not score. In Game 3, he came in for relief for the first time, but allowed six earned runs, recording only two outs. In the deciding Game 5, he finished the seventh inning and pitched one out of the eighth, allowing zero runs and zero hits. In Game 2 of the NLCS against the St. Louis Cardinals, he pitched to one batter in the ninth inning. He started NLCS Game 4, recording the win in the Nationals' pennant-clinching victory.

In the 2019 World Series against the Houston Astros, Corbin relieved Max Scherzer in Game 1, pitching a scoreless sixth inning. Starting Game 4, he took the loss after giving up 4 runs over 6 innings. In Game 7, Corbin pitched the sixth, seventh, and eighth innings, allowing no runs and just two hits. He was the winning pitcher, leading to the Nationals' first championship in franchise history. Corbin's 13.886 strikeouts per nine innings pitched in the 2019 playoffs was the third highest by a pitcher in a single MLB postseason. Corbin won the 2019 Warren Spahn Award.

==== 2020–2024: struggles ====
In 2020, Corbin was 2–7 with a 4.66 ERA and 60 strikeouts in 65 2/3 innings pitched across 11 starts. He led the NL in hits allowed (85) and had the highest WHIP of all NL-qualified pitchers (1.569).

In 2021, Corbin had what was up to that point the worst season of his career. His ERA of 5.82 was the worst among qualified pitchers, and he led the National League in home runs allowed (37) and the majors in losses (16), earned runs allowed (111), and OPS against (.855). He gave up the most home runs per 9 innings pitched of all major leaguers, at 1.94.

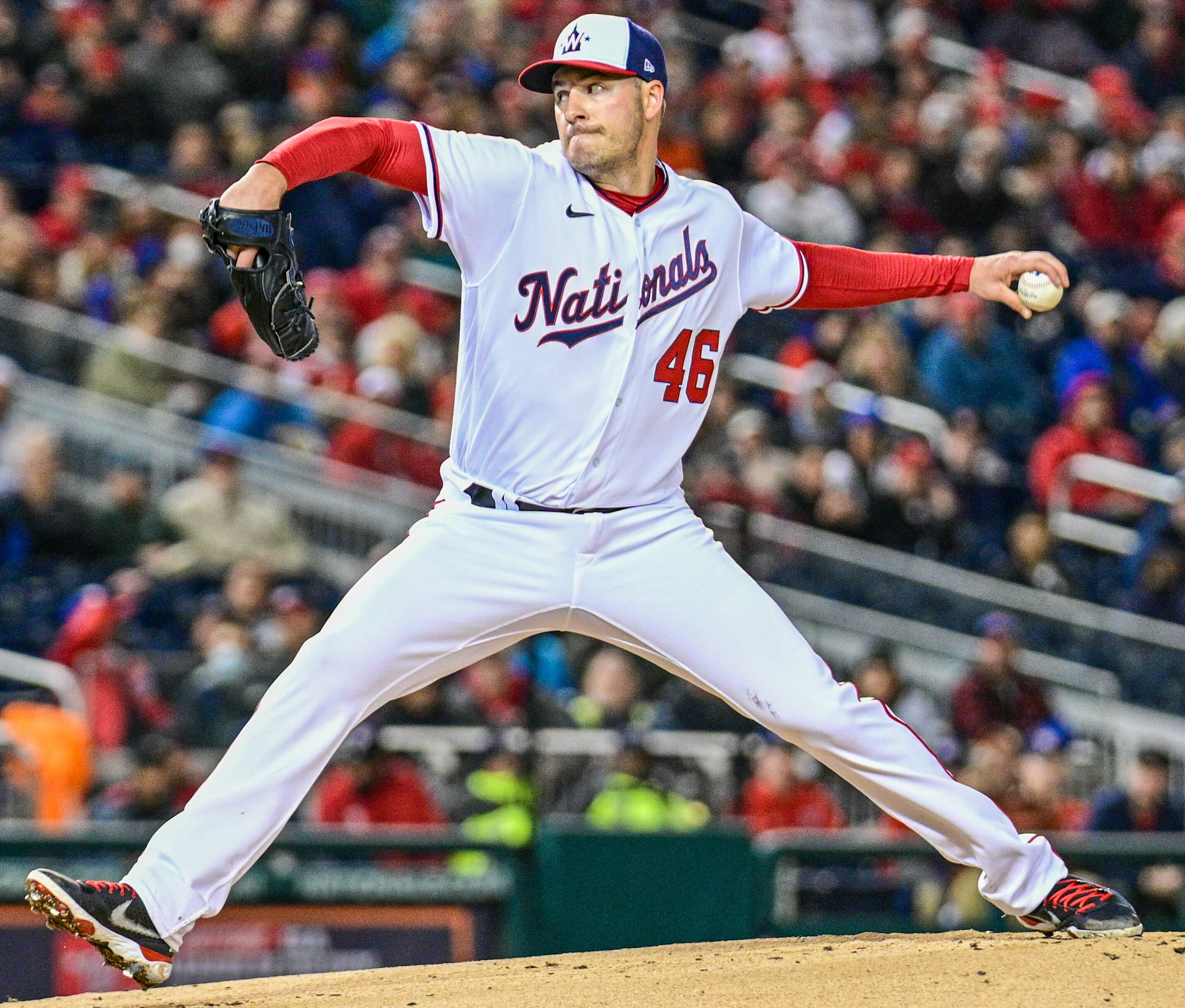
Corbin with the Nationals in 2022

In 2022, Corbin's 6.31 ERA was the worst among major league starting pitchers. With his 6–19 record, he led the NL in losses, while giving up a major-league-leading 210 hits in 152 2/3 innings, a major league batting average against of .321, a major league slugging percentage against of .513, and gave up the highest percentage of hard-hit balls (39.9%).

In 2023, despite reaching 10 wins for the first time since 2019, Corbin led the NL in losses once again, pitching to a 10–15 record. Corbin finished the season with a slightly better ERA of 5.20, 124 strikeouts, and a batting average against of .293 over 180 innings pitched.

On August 22, 2024, Corbin recorded his 100th career win after pitching six innings and allowing just one run in a start against the Colorado Rockies. He made 32 starts for Washington during the campaign, compiling a 6-13 record and 5.62 ERA with 139 strikeouts across 174 2/3 innings pitched.

Despite several years of struggles after the 2019 championship, Nationals players and executives held Corbin in high regard at the end of his tenure with the team, crediting his heroics during the World Series and durability during the subsequent years.

=== Texas Rangers (2025) ===
On March 18, 2025, Corbin signed a one-year contract with the Texas Rangers, with a base salary of $1.1 million plus incentives based upon the number of appearances and innings pitched. Corbin was optioned to the Triple-A Round Rock Express on March 25 in order to build up stamina, after missing the majority of spring training. On April 4, Texas recalled Corbin after Jack Leiter was placed on the injured list. He made 31 appearances (30 starts) for the Rangers during the regular season, compiling a 7–11 record and 4.40 ERA with 131 strikeouts across 155 1/3 innings pitched.

=== Toronto Blue Jays (2026) ===
On April 3, 2026, Corbin signed a one-year, $1 million contract with the Toronto Blue Jays; he was subsequently assigned to the Low-A Dunedin Blue Jays. He was selected to the active roster after making one rehab start and made his debut for Toronto on April 10, 2026, against the Minnesota Twins. Corbin had a 3.65 ERA in his first ten games started, before pitching to an 8.69 ERA over 19 2/3 innings in June, leading the Jays to remove him from the starting rotation. On July 23, Corbin was placed on the injured list due to a left teres major strain; he was transferred to the 60–day injured list on August 5. He made 19 appearances (15 starts) for the Blue Jays during the regular season, compiling a 3–4 record and 5.51 ERA with 63 strikeouts across 80 innings pitched.

== Scouting report ==
Corbin is listed at 6 feet 3 inches (1.91 m) and 210 pounds (95 kg). His pitching repertoire contains a fastball of the four-seam and sinking variety that both average 92 miles per hour (148 km/h), occasionally topping out at 95 miles an hour. His secondary pitches include a changeup, which he throws between 81 miles per hour (130 km/h) and 82 miles per hour (132 km/h) and a slider, which he throws between 78 miles per hour (126 km/h) and 79 miles per hour (127 km/h), and considered his best pitch coming out of college. He added a cutter during the 2024 season in an attempt to counteract his struggles against righties.

Corbin improved his changeup after pitching in Instructional League during the 2009–10 offseason, which led Corbin to consider it a better pitch than his slider. However, Todd Helton, after striking out twice against Corbin early in the 2013 season, dubbed Corbin's slider "the best I've ever seen." In 2011, he developed a knuckle curve, which he believes contributed to his consecutive scoreless innings streak. His usage of this pitch declined throughout his career until he began to throw it again during the 2024 season to offset hitters’ timing.

== Personal life ==
Former Diamondbacks teammate Paul Goldschmidt described Corbin as "humble" about his success. With his signing bonus, Corbin bought a used car instead of a new one. He lived in his parents' basement during the 2012–13 winter and officiated youth basketball games during the offseason.

Corbin met his wife, Jen, when they were high school classmates. They married in November 2018. They live in Phoenix, Arizona, during the offseason. The couple has two sons.

Corbin was friends with former teammate Tyler Skaggs, who died on July 1, 2019. They played rookie ball together as well as Class AA baseball. Skaggs was a groomsman in Corbin's wedding. On July 2, Corbin honored Skaggs by wearing 45 for a game against the Miami Marlins.

Corbin endorsed Donald Trump in the 2020 United States presidential election by tweeting a picture of the two of them on a golf course captioned "#Vote #Trump2020." Due to Trump's unpopularity in Canada, this has led to him receiving backlash from Toronto Blue Jays fans.

During his time with the Nationals, Corbin and his wife made a six-figure contribution to the Nationals Youth Baseball Academy.

== See also ==
- Arizona Diamondbacks award winners and league leaders
- List of Major League Baseball annual shutout leaders
- List of Washington Nationals team records
- List of World Series starting pitchers
