= Chris Stratton =

American baseball player (born 1990)

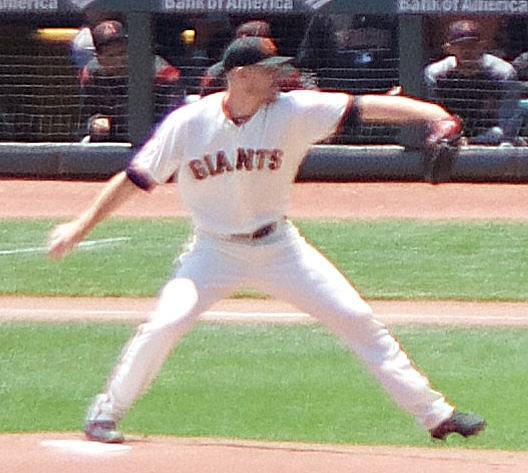
- Stratton pitching for the San Francisco Giants

Free agent
- Pitcher
- Born: August 22, 1990 (age 36); Tupelo, Mississippi, U.S.
- Bats: Right Throws: Right

MLB debut
- May 30, 2016, for the San Francisco Giants

MLB statistics (through May 16, 2025)
- Win–loss record: 41–27
- Earned run average: 4.63
- Strikeouts: 564
- Stats at Baseball Reference

Teams
- San Francisco Giants (2016–2018); Los Angeles Angels (2019); Pittsburgh Pirates (2019–2022); St. Louis Cardinals (2022–2023); Texas Rangers (2023); Kansas City Royals (2024–2025); Los Angeles Dodgers (2025)

Career highlights and awards
- World Series champion (2023)

Christopher Lee Stratton (born August 22, 1990) is an American professional baseball pitcher who is a free agent. He has previously played in Major League Baseball (MLB) for the San Francisco Giants, Los Angeles Angels, Pittsburgh Pirates, St. Louis Cardinals, Texas Rangers, Kansas City Royals, and Los Angeles Dodgers

== Early life ==
Christopher Lee Stratton was born on August 22, 1990, in Tupelo, Mississippi. Stratton graduated from Tupelo High School, in Tupelo, Mississippi.

== College career ==
He then attended Mississippi State University from 2010 to 2012. In 2011, he played collegiate summer baseball with the Harwich Mariners of the Cape Cod Baseball League. As a senior, he was a consensus All-American after going 11–2 with a 2.38 earned run average (ERA) and 127 strikeouts. He was also the Southeastern Conference Pitcher of the Year. He also won the C Spire Ferriss Trophy as Mississippi's top collegiate baseball player.

== Professional career ==
=== San Francisco Giants ===
==== Minor leagues ====
The San Francisco Giants selected Stratton in the first round of the 2012 Major League Baseball draft. He was assigned to the Low–A Salem-Keizer Volcanoes to begin his professional career. In August of that year, Stratton was hospitalized after a line drive struck him in the head during batting practice. A severe concussion from that event ended his season after only eight appearances, where he had a 3.31 ERA.

Before the 2013 season, Baseball America ranked Stratton as the Giants' third best prospect. He played for the Single-A Augusta GreenJackets of the South Atlantic League, pitching to a 9–3 record, 3.27 ERA and striking out 123 in 22 starts and making the midseason all-star team. In 2014, he began the season with the San Jose Giants of the California League before being promoted to the Double–A Richmond Flying Squirrels on July 29. Between the two levels, he was 8–9 with a 4.78 ERA and 120 strikeouts across 24 appearances.

Stratton was a non-roster invitee to major league spring training in 2015 and after beginning the season with Richmond he was promoted to the Triple–A Sacramento River Cats. Between the two levels, he was 5–10 with a 3.95 ERA in 26 starts with 111 strikeouts. On November 20, 2015, the Giants added Stratton to their 40-man roster to protect him from the Rule 5 draft. In 2016 with Sacramento, he made 17 starts and logged a 12–6 record and 4.08 ERA with 103 strikeouts.

==== Major leagues ====
Stratton was called up from Sacramento to the major leagues on May 28, 2016, to replace the injured Matt Cain. Despite being primarily a starter in the minors, the Giants added him to their bullpen and he made his major league debut against the Atlanta Braves on May 30, pitching a scoreless bottom of the eighth inning and recording two strikeouts (his first being of Nick Markakis) while retiring all three batters he faced. On June 11, he was credited with his first major league win as he pitched the top of the 10th inning in the Giants victory against the Los Angeles Dodgers. On June 13 he was sent down again when Cain returned from the DL, but was recalled the following day when Cain was put back on the DL with a re-injured hamstring. Stratton pitched in seven games for the Giants with a 1–0 record and a 3.60 ERA.

In 2017, Stratton split his season between the Giants and the River Cats, making 15 starts in the minors with a 4–5 record and 5.11 ERA and 13 appearances (10 starts) for the Giants, with a 4–4 record and 3.84 ERA. His first major league start was on July 6 against the Detroit Tigers, allowing five runs in 6 2/3 innings.

Stratton made the Giants opening day roster for the 2018 season. On September 14, he threw his first MLB complete game against the Colorado Rockies, winning by a score of 2–0. It was his 10th win of the season, making him the Giants’ first pitcher to reach double-digit victories since 2016. It was also the first complete game of the season for the Giants, and the first shutout for the team in over a year. Stratton finished the 2018 season with a 10–10 record, 5.09 ERA and 112 strikeouts in 145 innings over 28 appearances (26 starts).

=== Los Angeles Angels ===
On March 26, 2019, Stratton was traded to the Los Angeles Angels in exchange for Williams Jerez. In seven appearances (five starts) for Los Angeles, he struggled to an 0-2 record and 8.59 ERA with 22 strikeouts across 29 1/3 innings pitched. He was designated for assignment on May 7.

=== Pittsburgh Pirates ===
On May 11, 2019, the Angels traded Stratton to the Pittsburgh Pirates in exchange for cash considerations. In 46 2/3 innings with the Pirates, Stratton pitched a 3.66 ERA with a 9.1 K/9 rate and 1.39 WHIP. In 2020, Stratton recorded a 3.90 ERA with 39 strikeouts and a career-high 11.9 K/9 rate in 30 innings of work. In 2021, Stratton led the Pirates with seven wins and recorded a 3.63 ERA with 86 strikeouts over 79 1/3 innings.

=== St. Louis Cardinals ===
On August 1, 2022, the Pirates traded Stratton and José Quintana to the St. Louis Cardinals for Malcom Núñez and Johan Oviedo. Stratton recorded 60 strikeouts with an 8.5 K/9 and a 4.26 ERA in his 2022 season, and went 5–0 with the Cardinals after recording a 5–4 record with the Pirates.

=== Texas Rangers ===
On July 30, 2023, the Cardinals traded Stratton and Jordan Montgomery to the Texas Rangers in exchange for John King, Tekoah Roby, and Thomas Saggese. In 22 appearances for Texas, Stratton recorded a 3.41 ERA with 22 strikeouts over 29 innings of work. He also pitched in the postseason for the first time in his career, allowing two runs on two hits in 2 2/3 innings in the 2023 American League Championship Series against the Houston Astros and two runs on two hits in 1 1/3 innings against the Arizona Diamondbacks in the 2023 World Series. The Rangers won the World Series, and Stratton got his first championship ring.

=== Kansas City Royals ===
On December 15, 2023, Stratton signed a one-year, major league contract with the Kansas City Royals. He made 57 appearances out of the bullpen in 2024, compiling a 4-3 record and 5.55 ERA with 44 strikeouts and four saves across 58 1/3 innings pitched. On October 31, 2024, Stratton exercised a player option for 2025 with the Royals.

Stratton made 12 appearances for the Royals in 2025, and struggled to a 7.94 ERA with 16 strikeouts across 17 innings pitched. On May 18, 2025, he was designated for assignment by Kansas City and was released on May 22.

=== Los Angeles Dodgers ===
On May 25, 2025, Stratton signed a major league contract with the Los Angeles Dodgers. He pitched in two games for the Dodgers, allowing two runs in three innings before being designated for assignment on June 2. Stratton cleared waivers and elected free agency on June 5, only to re-sign with the Dodgers on a new major league contract the following day. He pitched in one inning that day, allowing a solo home run, and then was designated for assignment again on June 7. Once more, Stratton elected to become a free agent after clearing waivers on June 9.
