= 2018 Atlanta Braves season =

2018 Atlanta Braves
- National League East champions
- League: National League
- Division: East
- Ballpark: SunTrust Park
- City: Atlanta
- Record: 90–72 (.556)
- Divisional place: 1st
- Owners: Liberty Media/John Malone
- General managers: Alex Anthopoulos
- Managers: Brian Snitker
- Television: Fox Sports Southeast; Fox Sports South (Chip Caray, Joe Simpson, Tom Glavine, Dale Murphy, Jeff Francoeur)
- Radio: 680 The Fan; Rock 100.5; Atlanta Braves Radio Network (Jim Powell, Don Sutton, Mark Lemke, Jeff Francoeur)

The 2018 Atlanta Braves season was the Braves' 53rd season in Atlanta, 148th overall, and second season at SunTrust Park. They completely reversed their 72-90 season in 2017, and made the postseason and won a division title for the first time since 2013. They lost to the Los Angeles Dodgers in four games in the NLDS.

== Offseason ==
=== October ===
On October 2, 2017, John Coppolella resigned as general manager of the Braves amid a Major League Baseball investigation into Atlanta's international signings, having committed what the Braves termed "a breach of MLB rules regarding the international player market".

=== November ===
On November 13, 2017, the Braves announced Alex Anthopoulos as the new general manager and executive vice president. John Hart was removed as team president and assumed a senior adviser role with the organization. Braves chairman Terry McGuirk apologized to fans "on behalf of the entire Braves family" for the scandal. McGuirk described Anthopoulos as "a man of integrity" and that "he will operate in a way that will make all of our Braves fans proud." On November 17, 2017, the Braves announced that John Hart had stepped down as senior advisor for the organization. Hart said in a statement that "with the hiring of Alex Anthopoulos as general manager, this organization is in great hands."

On November 21, 2017, Major League Baseball Commissioner Rob Manfred announced the findings of the MLB investigation into Atlanta's international signings. Manfred ruled that the Braves must forfeit 13 international prospects, including highly touted Kevin Maitan, an infielder from Venezuela who signed for $4.25 million in 2016. The team also forfeited a third-round draft pick in the 2018 draft. Former Braves general manager John Coppolella was placed on baseball's permanently ineligible list.

Additionally, the Braves shall be prohibited from signing any international player for more than $10,000 during the 2019–20 signing period and their international signing bonus pool for the 2020–21 signing period will be reduced by 50 percent.

=== December ===
The Braves traded outfielder Matt Kemp to the Los Angeles Dodgers for infielder Charlie Culberson, first baseman Adrián González and pitchers Scott Kazmir and Brandon McCarthy on December 16, 2017. The Braves released Adrián González a few days later.

== Regular season ==
=== Game log ===
2018 Game Log: 90–72 (Home: 43–38; Away: 47–34)
March/April: 16–11 (Home: 8–4; Away: 8–7)

#	Date	Opponent	Score	Win	Loss	Save	Attendance	Record	Box/Streak
1	March 29	Phillies	8–5	**Vizcaíno** (1–0)	Neris (0–1)	—	40,208	1–0	W1
2	March 30	Phillies	4–5 (11)	Hutchison (1–0)	**Carle** (0–1)	—	35,123	1–1	L1
3	March 31	Phillies	15–2	**McCarthy** (1–0)	Velasquez (0–1)	—	37,777	2–1	W1
4	April 2	Nationals	1–8	Roark (1–0)	**Newcomb** (0–1)	—	25,054	2–2	L1
5	April 3	Nationals	13–6	**Carle** (1–1)	Cole (0–1)	—	26,782	3–2	W1
6	April 4	Nationals	7–1	**Foltynewicz** (1–0)	Scherzer (1–1)	—	29,834	4–2	W2
7	April 6	@ Rockies	8–3	**McCarthy** (2–0)	Márquez (0–1)	—	48,216	5–2	W3
8	April 7	@ Rockies	2–3 (10)	Ottavino (2–0)	**Vizcaíno** (1–1)	—	40,120	5–3	L1
9	April 8	@ Rockies	4–0	**Newcomb** (1–1)	Freeland (0–2)	—	42,031	6–3	W1
10	April 9	@ Nationals	0–2	Scherzer (2–1)	**Teherán** (0–1)	—	19,528	6–4	L1
11	April 10	@ Nationals	1–4	Strasburg (2–1)	**Foltynewicz** (1–1)	Madson (1)	19,357	6–5	L2
12	April 11	@ Nationals	5–3 (12)	**Carle** (2–1)	Madson (0–1)	—	21,109	7–5	W1
13	April 13	@ Cubs	4–0	**Sánchez** (1–0)	Darvish (0–1)	—	29,775	8–5	W2
14	April 14	@ Cubs	10–14	Wilson (1–0)	**Ramirez** (0–1)	—	36,788	8–6	L1
—	April 15	@ Cubs	Postponed (rain); rescheduled for May 14						
15	April 16	Phillies	2–1	**Teherán** (1–1)	Nola (1–1)	**Vizcaíno** (1)	17,812	9–6	W1
16	April 17	Phillies	1–5	Neris (1–1)	**Ramirez** (0–2)	—	17,913	9–7	L1
17	April 18	Phillies	7–3	**McCarthy** (3–0)	Velasquez (1–2)	—	22,135	10–7	W1
18	April 19	Mets	12–4	**Wisler** (1–0)	Harvey (0–2)	—	23,610	11–7	W2
19	April 20	Mets	3–5 (12)	Gsellman (2–0)	**Ravin** (0–1)	Familia (8)	39,016	11–8	L1
20	April 21	Mets	4–3	**Biddle** (1–0)	Familia (1–1)	—	41,396	12–8	W1
—	April 22	Mets	Postponed (rain); rescheduled for May 28						
21	April 23	@ Reds	4–10	Romano (1–2)	**Freeman** (0–1)	Iglesias (3)	9,463	12–9	L1
22	April 24	@ Reds	7–9 (12)	Hughes (1–2)	**Fried** (0–1)	—	14,139	12–10	L2
23	April 25	@ Reds	4–3	**Winkler** (1–0)	Shackelford (0–1)	**Minter** (1)	13,113	13–10	W1
24	April 26	@ Reds	7–4	**Freeman** (1–1)	Peralta (1–1)	**Vizcaíno** (2)	11,919	14–10	W2
25	April 27	@ Phillies	3–7	Nola (3–1)	**Fried** (0–2)	—	27,076	14–11	L1
26	April 28	@ Phillies	4–1	**Foltynewicz** (2–1)	Pivetta (1–1)	**Vizcaíno** (3)	27,794	15–11	W1
27	April 29	@ Phillies	10–1	**McCarthy** (4–0)	Velasquez (1–4)	—	31,010	16–11	W2

May: 17–12 (Home: 6–7; Away: 11–5)

#	Date	Opponent	Score	Win	Loss	Save	Attendance	Record	Box/Streak
28	May 1	@ Mets	3–2	**Soroka** (1–0)	Syndergaard (2–1)	**Vizcaíno** (4)	22,527	17–11	W3
29	May 2	@ Mets	7–0	**Newcomb** (2–1)	Sewald (0–2)	—	23,528	18–11	W4
30	May 3	@ Mets	11–0	**Teherán** (2–1)	Vargas (0–2)	—	26,882	19–11	W5
31	May 4	Giants	4–9	Stratton (3–2)	**Foltynewicz** (2–2)	—	41,807	19–12	L1
32	May 5	Giants	2–11	Blach (3–3)	**McCarthy** (4–1)	—	38,264	19–13	L2
33	May 6	Giants	3–4	Suárez (1–1)	**Soroka** (1–1)	Strickland (8)	37,896	19–14	L3
34	May 8	@ Rays	1–0	**Newcomb** (3–1)	Snell (4–2)	**Vizcaíno** (5)	15,382	20–14	W1
35	May 9	@ Rays	5–2	**Teherán** (3–1)	Yarbrough (2–2)	**Vizcaíno** (6)	12,082	21–14	W2
36	May 10	@ Marlins	9–2	**Foltynewicz** (3–2)	Smith (2–4)	**Gohara** (1)	8,277	22–14	W3
37	May 11	@ Marlins	3–6	Straily (1–0)	**McCarthy** (4–2)	Ziegler (5)	9,149	22–15	L1
38	May 12	@ Marlins	10–5	**Minter** (1–0)	Steckenrider (1–1)	—	12,383	23–15	W1
39	May 13	@ Marlins	4–3	**Newcomb** (4–1)	Ureña (0–6)	**Vizcaíno** (7)	7,435	24–15	W2
40	May 14	@ Cubs	6–5	**Teherán** (4–1)	Quintana (4–3)	**Minter** (2)	35,946	25–15	W3
41	May 15	Cubs	2–3	Edwards Jr. (2–0)	**Vizcaíno** (1–2)	Morrow (10)	34,452	25–16	L1
42	May 16	Cubs	4–1	**Minter** (2–0)	Edwards Jr. (2–1)	**Vizcaíno** (8)	28,264	26–16	W1
—	May 17	Cubs	Postponed (rain); rescheduled for August 30						
43	May 18	Marlins	0–2	Straily (2–0)	**Wisler** (1–1)	Ziegler (8)	27,705	26–17	L1
44	May 19	Marlins	8–1	**Newcomb** (5–1)	Ureña (0–7)	—	37,715	27–17	W1
45	May 20	Marlins	10–9	**Minter** (3–0)	Guerrero (0–2)	—	28,352	28–17	W2
46	May 21	@ Phillies	0–3	Pivetta (4–2)	**Foltynewicz** (3–3)	Neris (9)	21,284	28–18	L1
47	May 22	@ Phillies	3–1	**McCarthy** (5–2)	Velasquez (4–5)	**Vizcaíno** (9)	18,545	29–18	W1
48	May 23	@ Phillies	0–4	Arrieta (4–2)	**Gohara** (0–1)	—	27,647	29–19	L1
49	May 25	@ Red Sox	2–6	Rodríguez (5–1)	**Teherán** (4–2)	—	37,008	29–20	L2
50	May 26	@ Red Sox	6–8	Wright (1–0)	**Freeman** (1–2)	Kimbrel (16)	36,510	29–21	L3
51	May 27	@ Red Sox	7–1	**Foltynewicz** (4–3)	Sale (5–2)	—	36,543	30–21	W1
52	May 28 (1)	Mets	4–3	**Carle** (3–1)	Lugo (1–1)	—	32,377	31–21	W2
53	May 28 (2)	Mets	5–8	Gsellman (5-1)	**Minter** (3-1)	Familia (14)	31,779	31–22	L1
54	May 29	Mets	7–6	**Winkler** (2–0)	Bautista (0–1)	—	19,443	32–22	W1
55	May 30	Mets	1–4	Vargas (2–3)	**Teherán** (4–3)	Gsellman (2)	21,449	32–23	L1
56	May 31	Nationals	4–2	**Newcomb** (6–1)	Roark (2–5)	**Vizcaíno** (10)	22,380	33–23	W1

June: 14–11 (Home: 9–6; Away: 5–5)

#	Date	Opponent	Score	Win	Loss	Save	Attendance	Record	Box/Streak
57	June 1	Nationals	4–0	**Foltynewicz** (5–3)	Strasburg (6–5)	—	33,845	34–23	W2
58	June 2	Nationals	3–5 (14)	Miller (2–0)	**Socolovich** (0–1)	Doolittle (14)	39,578	34–24	L1
59	June 3	Nationals	4–2	**Vizcaíno** (2–2)	Roark (2–6)	–	33,132	35–24	W1
60	June 4	@ Padres	4–11	Richard (4–6)	**Teherán** (4–4)	—	19,419	35–25	L1
61	June 5	@ Padres	14–1	**Newcomb** (7–1)	Lyles (2–2)	**Jackson** (1)	21,049	36–25	W1
62	June 6	@ Padres	1–3	Castillo (1–0)	**Foltynewicz** (5–4)	Hand (18)	20,898	36–26	L1
63	June 8	@ Dodgers	3–7	Buehler (4–1)	**McCarthy** (5–3)	—	47,262	36–27	L2
64	June 9	@ Dodgers	5–3	**Sánchez** (2–0)	Wood (1–5)	**Vizcaíno** (11)	52,718	37–27	W1
65	June 10	@ Dodgers	2–7	Stripling (5–1)	**Newcomb** (7–2)	—	47,711	37–28	L1
66	June 12	Mets	8–2	**Carle** (4–1)	Wheeler (2–5)	—	29,892	38–28	W1
67	June 13	Mets	2–0	**Soroka** (2–1)	deGrom (4–2)	**Vizcaíno** (12)	32,015	39–28	W2
68	June 14	Padres	4–2	**Sánchez** (3–0)	Ross (5–4)	**Vizcaíno** (13)	25,250	40–28	W3
69	June 15	Padres	3–9	Richard (6–6)	**Freeman** (1–3)	—	41,497	40–29	L1
70	June 16	Padres	1–0	**Newcomb** (8–2)	Lyles (2–4)	**Vizcaíno** (14)	41,916	41–29	W1
71	June 17	Padres	4–1	**Teherán** (5–4)	Castillo (1–1)	**Vizcaíno** (15)	40,251	42–29	W2
72	June 19	@ Blue Jays	11–4	**Freeman** (2–3)	García (2–6)	—	32,466	43–29	W3
73	June 20	@ Blue Jays	4–5	Happ (9–3)	**Sánchez** (3–1)	Tepera (5)	45,563	43–30	L1
74	June 22	Orioles	7–10 (15)	Wright (1–0)	**Moylan** (0–1)	—	37,192	43–31	L2
75	June 23	Orioles	5–7	Bundy (6–7)	**Teherán** (5–5)	Britton (1)	40,333	43–32	L3
76	June 24	Orioles	7–3	**McCarthy** (6–3)	Hess (2–4)	—	33,794	44–32	W1
77	June 25	Reds	5–4 (11)	**Jackson** (1–0)	Floro (2–2)	—	27,851	45–32	W2
78	June 26	Reds	3–5	Harvey (3–5)	**Sánchez** (3–2)	Iglesias (14)	28,356	45–33	L1
79	June 27	Reds	5–6	Stephens (2–0)	**Freeman** (2–4)	Iglesias (15)	30,207	45–34	L2
80	June 29	@ Cardinals	5–1	**Teherán** (6–5)	Mikolas (8–3)	**Winkler** (1)	46,226	46–34	W1
81	June 30	@ Cardinals	11–4	**Fried** (1–2)	Weaver (4–7)	—	46,667	47–34	W2

July: 10–13 (Home: 5–6; Away: 5–7)

#	Date	Opponent	Score	Win	Loss	Save	Attendance	Record	Box/Streak
82	July 1	@ Cardinals	6–5	**Foltynewicz** (6–4)	Gant (2–3)	**Minter** (3)	46,448	48–34	W3
83	July 2	@ Yankees	5–3 (11)	**Biddle** (2–0)	Robertson (5–3)	**Minter** (4)	43,792	49–34	W4
84	July 3	@ Yankees	5–8	Cole (3–1)	**Newcomb** (8–3)	Chapman (24)	45,448	49–35	L1
85	July 4	@ Yankees	2–6	Sabathia (6–3)	**Teherán** (6–6)	—	46,658	49–36	L2
86	July 5	@ Brewers	2–7	Chacín (7–3)	**Fried** (1–3)	Jennings (1)	27,557	49–37	L3
87	July 6	@ Brewers	4–5	Peralta (4–1)	**Foltynewicz** (6–5)	Knebel (11)	31,452	49–38	L4
88	July 7	@ Brewers	5–1	**Sánchez** (4–2)	Wilkerson (0–1)	—	38,813	50–38	W1
89	July 8	@ Brewers	3–10	Guerra (6–5)	**Newcomb** (8–4)	—	43,262	50–39	L1
90	July 10	Blue Jays	2–6	Stroman (2–6)	**Minter** (3–2)	—	31,747	50–40	L2
91	July 11	Blue Jays	9–5	**Foltynewicz** (7–5)	Gaviglio (2–3)	—	27,839	51–40	W1
92	July 13	Diamondbacks	1–2	Godley (11–6)	**Freeman** (2–5)	Boxberger (23)	42,130	51-41	L1
93	July 14	Diamondbacks	0–3	Greinke (10–5)	**Newcomb** (8–5)	Boxberger (24)	40,862	51-42	L2
94	July 15	Diamondbacks	5–1	**Teherán** (7–6)	Corbin (6–4)	—	27,323	52-42	W1
**89th All-Star Game in Washington, D.C.**
95	July 20	@ Nationals	8–5	**Sánchez** (5–2)	Strasburg (6–7)	**Minter** (5)	41,008	53-42	W2
—	July 21	@ Nationals	Postponed (rain); Rescheduled for August 7 as part of a doubleheader.						
96	July 22	@ Nationals	2–6	Scherzer (13–5)	**Foltynewicz** (7–6)	Herrera (15)	39,063	53-43	L1
97	July 23	@ Marlins	12–1	**Newcomb** (9–5)	Ureña (2–10)	—	8.259	54–43	W1
98	July 24	@ Marlins	3–9	Chen (3–7)	**Teherán** (7–7)	—	21,673	54–44	L1
99	July 26	Dodgers	2–8	Hill (4–4)	**Sánchez** (5–3)	—	40,706	54–45	L2
100	July 27	Dodgers	1–4	Kershaw (4–5)	**Foltynewicz** (7–7)	Jansen (30)	41,647	54–46	L3
101	July 28	Dodgers	1–5	Wood (7–5)	**Fried** (1–4)	–	41, 758	54–47	L4
102	July 29	Dodgers	4–1	**Newcomb** (10–5)	Stirpling (8–3)	—	40,303	55–47	W1
103	July 30	Marlins	5–3	**Teherán** (8–7)	Chen (3–8)	**Minter** (6)	21,230	56–47	W2
104	July 31	Marlins	11–6	**Allard** (1–0)	Straily (4–5)	—	18,627	57–47	W3

August: 17–13 (Home: 7–8; Away: 10–5)

#	Date	Opponent	Score	Win	Loss	Save	Attendance	Record	Box/Streak
—	August 1	Marlins	Postponed (rain); Rescheduled for August 13 as part of a doubleheader.						
105	August 2	@ Mets	4–2	**Foltynewicz** (8–7)	Vargas (2–7)	**Minter** (7)	24,525	58–47	W4
106	August 3	@ Mets	2–1	**Sánchez** (6–3)	deGrom (5–7)	**Minter** (8)	25,101	59–47	W5
107	August 4	@ Mets	0–3	Wheeler (6–6)	**Gausman** (5–9)	Gsellman (6)	36,946	59–48	L1
108	August 5	@ Mets	5–4	**Minter** (4–5)	Bashlor (0–1)	**Biddle** (1)	27,134	60–48	W1
109	August 7 (1)	@ Nationals	3–8	Rodríguez (1–0)	**Allard** (1–1)	—	26,965	60–49	L1
110	August 7 (2)	@ Nationals	3–1	**Biddle** (3–0)	Herrera (2–3)	**Minter** (9)	28,970	61–49	W1
111	August 8	@ Nationals	8–3	**Foltynewicz** (9–7)	Milone (1–1)	—	30,203	62–49	W2
112	August 9	@ Nationals	3–6	González (7–8)	**Parsons** (0–1)	—	28,347	62–50	L1
113	August 10	Brewers	10–1	**Gausman** (6–9)	Peralta (5–3)	—	36,519	63–50	W1
114	August 11	Brewers	2–4	Burnes (3–0)	**Biddle** (3–1)	Hader (9)	40,297	63–51	L1
115	August 12	Brewers	8–7	**Venters** (2–1)	Jennings (4–4)	**Minter** (10)	25,360	64–51	W1
116	August 13 (1)	Marlins	9–1	**Toussaint** (1–0)	López (2–3)	—	16,049	65–51	W2
117	August 13 (2)	Marlins	6–1	**Foltynewicz** (10–7)	González (2–1)	—	18,186	66–51	W3
118	August 14	Marlins	10–6	**Biddle** (4–1)	Conley (3–3)	—	19,409	67–51	W4
119	August 15	Marlins	5–2	**Gausman** (7–9)	García (1-2)	**Minter** (11)	19,045	68-51	W5
120	August 16	Rockies	3–5	Oh (5–3)	**Brach** (1–3)	Davis (33)	23,428	68-52	L1
121	August 17	Rockies	5–11	Freeland (11–7)	**Newcomb** (10–6)	—	28,964	68-53	L2
122	August 18	Rockies	3–5 (10)	Ottavino (5–2)	**Jackson** (1–1)	Davis (34)	42,143	68-54	L3
123	August 19	Rockies	2–4	Márquez (11–9)	**Sánchez** (6–4)	Davis (35)	33,942	68-55	L4
124	August 20	@ Pirates	1–0	**Wilson** (1–0)	Archer (4–6)	**Winkler** (2)	16,445	69-55	W1
125	August 21	@ Pirates	6–1	**Gausman** (8–9)	Nova (7–8)	—	13,280	70-55	W2
126	August 22	@ Pirates	2–1	**Teherán** (9–7)	Crick (2–2)	**Venters** (2)	14,249	71-55	W3
127	August 23	@ Marlins	5–0	**Newcomb** (11–6)	Hernandez (2–7)	—	6,587	72-55	W4
128	August 24	@ Marlins	0–1	Straily (5–6)	**Foltynewicz** (10–8)	Conley (2)	7,792	72-56	L1
129	August 25	@ Marlins	1–3	Chen (5–9)	**Sánchez** (6–5)	Steckenrider (2)	7,823	72-57	L2
130	August 26	@ Marlins	4–0	**Gausman** (9–9)	López (2–4)	—	12,770	73-57	W1
131	August 28	Rays	9–5	**Brach** (2–3)	Roe (1–3)	—	21,216	74-57	W2
132	August 29	Rays	5–8	Beeks (4–1)	**Newcomb** (11–7)	Alvarado (6)	20,876	74-58	L1
133	August 30	Cubs	4–5	Kintzler (2–3)	**Foltynewicz** (10–9)	Strop (11)	37,603	74-59	L2
134	August 31	Pirates	2–3	Taillon (11–9)	**Brach** (2–4)	Vázquez (29)	36,650	74-60	L3

September: 16–12 (Home: 8–7; Away: 8–5)

#	Date	Opponent	Score	Win	Loss	Save	Attendance	Record	Box/Streak
135	September 1	Pirates	5–3	**Venters** (3–1)	Kela (3–4)	**Minter** (12)	33,705	75–60	W1
136	September 2	Pirates	5–1	**Venters** (4–1)	Brault (3–1)	—	37,475	76–60	W2
137	September 3	Red Sox	2–8	Workman (3–0)	**Toussaint** (1–1)	—	40,394	76–61	L1
138	September 4	Red Sox	1–5	Porcello (16–7)	**Newcomb** (11–8)	—	35,333	76–62	L2
139	September 5	Red Sox	8–9	Workman (4–0)	**Minter** (4–3)	Kimbrel (38)	28,386	76–63	L3
140	September 6	@ Diamondbacks	7–6 (10)	**Biddle** (5–1)	Boxberger (2–6)	**Brach** (12)	21,903	77–63	W1
141	September 7	@ Diamondbacks	3–5	Corbin (11–5)	**Gausman** (9–10)	Boxberger(32)	31,308	77–64	L1
142	September 8	@ Diamondbacks	5–4 (10)	**Sobotka** (1–0)	Chafin (1–5)	**Minter** (13)	40,482	78–64	W1
143	September 9	@ Diamondbacks	9–5	**Freeman** (3–5)	Boxberger (2–7)	—	28,339	79–64	W2
144	September 10	@ Giants	4–1	**Newcomb** (12–8)	Rodríguez (6–3)	**Minter** (14)	35,996	80–64	W3
145	September 11	@ Giants	4–1	**Foltynewicz** (11-9)	Suarez (6–11)	—	35,285	81–64	W4
146	September 12	@ Giants	2–1	**Winkler** (3-0)	Smith (2-3)	**Venters** (3)	38,156	82–64	W5
147	September 14	Nationals	10–5	**Gausman** (10–10)	Scherzer (17–7)	—	39,268	83–64	W6
148	September 15	Nationals	1–7	Rodríguez (3–2)	**Teherán** (9–8)	—	36,050	83–65	L1
149	September 16	Nationals	4–6	Roark (9–15)	**Newcomb** (12–9)	Doolittle (24)	33,403	83–66	L2
150	September 17	Cardinals	6–11	Mikolas (16–4)	**Foltynewicz** (11–10)	—	24,304	83–67	L3
151	September 18	Cardinals	1–8	Gomber (6–1)	**Sánchez** (6–6)	—	23,083	83–68	L4
152	September 19	Cardinals	7–3	**Toussaint** (2–1)	Flaherty (8–8)	—	25,195	84–68	W1
153	September 20	Phillies	8–3	**Biddle** (6–1)	Hunter (4–4)	—	27,474	85–68	W2
154	September 21	Phillies	6–5	**Venters** (5–1)	Neshek (3–2)	**Minter** (15)	34,370	86–68	W3
155	September 22	Phillies	5–3	**Foltynewicz** (12-10)	Arrieta (10-10)	**Vizcaino** (16)	35,616	87–68	W4
156	September 23	Phillies	2–1	**Sánchez** (7-6)	Nola (16-6)	Carle (1)	34,214	88–68	W5
157	September 25	@ Mets	7–3	**Winkler** (4–0)	Gsellman (6–3)	—	21,943	89–68	W6
158	September 26	@ Mets	0–3	deGrom (10–9)	**Jackson** (1–2)	Lugo (3)	23,205	89–69	L1
159	September 27	@ Mets	1–4	Vargas (7–2)	**Teherán** (9–9)	Gsellman (13)	24,824	89–70	L2
160	September 28	@ Phillies	10–2	**Foltynewicz** (13–10)	Eickhoff (0–1)	—	24,306	90–70	W1
161	September 29	@ Phillies	0–3	Nola (17–6)	**Venters** (5–2)	Domínguez (15)	30,886	90–71	L1
162	September 30	@ Phillies	1–3	Hunter (5–4)	**Gausman** (10–11)	Domínguez (16)	34,202	90–72	L2

Legend: = Win = Loss = Postponement
Bold = Braves team member

=== National League East ===
NL East
Team	W	L	Pct.	GB	Home	Road
Atlanta Braves	90	72	.556	—	43‍–‍38	47‍–‍34
Washington Nationals	82	80	.506	8	41‍–‍40	41‍–‍40
Philadelphia Phillies	80	82	.494	10	49‍–‍32	31‍–‍50
New York Mets	77	85	.475	13	37‍–‍44	40‍–‍41
Miami Marlins	63	98	.391	26½	38‍–‍43	25‍–‍55

=== National League Wild Card ===
Division leaders
Team	W	L	Pct.
Milwaukee Brewers	96	67	.589
Los Angeles Dodgers	92	71	.564
Atlanta Braves	90	72	.556

Wild Card teams (Top 2 teams qualify for postseason)
Team	W	L	Pct.	GB
Chicago Cubs	95	68	.583	+4
Colorado Rockies	91	72	.558	—
St. Louis Cardinals	88	74	.543	2½
Pittsburgh Pirates	82	79	.509	8
Arizona Diamondbacks	82	80	.506	8½
Washington Nationals	82	80	.506	8½
Philadelphia Phillies	80	82	.494	10½
New York Mets	77	85	.475	13½
San Francisco Giants	73	89	.451	17½
Cincinnati Reds	67	95	.414	23½
San Diego Padres	66	96	.407	24½
Miami Marlins	63	98	.391	27

=== Record vs. opponents ===
2018 National League record Source: MLB Standings Grid – 2018
Team	AZ	ATL	CHC	CIN	COL	LAD	MIA	MIL	NYM	PHI	PIT	SD	SF	STL	WSH	AL
Arizona	—	3–4	3–4	3–3	8–11	11–8	6–1	1–5	2–5	4–2	6–1	12–7	8–11	3–3	2–5	10–10
Atlanta	4–3	—	3–3	3–4	2–5	2–5	14–5	3–4	13–6	12–7	5–1	4–3	3–3	4–2	10–9	8–12
Chicago	4–3	3–3	—	11–8	3–3	4–3	5–2	11–9	6–1	4–2	10–9	5–2	3–3	9–10	4–3	13–7
Cincinnati	3–3	4–3	8–11	—	2–4	6–1	2–5	6–13	3–3	3–4	5–14	3–4	4–2	7–12	1–6	10–10
Colorado	11–8	5–2	3–3	4–2	—	7–13	2–4	2–5	6–1	5–2	3–3	11–8	12–7	2–5	5–2	13–7
Los Angeles	8–11	5–2	3–4	1–6	13–7	—	2–4	4–3	4–2	3–4	5–1	14–5	10–9	3–4	5–1	12–8
Miami	1–6	5–14	2–5	5–2	4–2	4–2	—	2–5	7–12	8–11	1–4	2–5	4–3	3–3	6–13	9–11
Milwaukee	5–1	4–3	9–11	13–6	5–2	3–4	5–2	—	4–3	3–3	7–12	4–2	6–1	11–8	4–2	13–7
New York	5–2	6–13	1–6	3–3	1–6	2–4	12–7	3–4	—	11–8	3–4	4–2	4–3	3–3	11–8	8–12
Philadelphia	2–4	7–12	2–4	4–3	2–5	4–3	11–8	3–3	8–11	—	6–1	3–3	4–3	4–3	8–11	12–8
Pittsburgh	1–6	1–5	9–10	14–5	3–3	1–5	4–1	12–7	4–3	1–6	—	3–4	4–3	8–11	2–5	15–5
San Diego	7–12	3–4	2–5	4–3	8–11	5–14	5–2	2–4	2–4	3–3	4–3	—	8–11	4–3	2–4	7–13
San Francisco	11–8	3–3	3–3	2–4	7–12	9–10	3–4	1–6	3–4	3–4	3–4	11–8	—	2–5	4–2	8–12
St. Louis	3–3	2–4	10–9	12–7	5–2	4–3	3–3	8–11	3–3	3–4	11–8	3–4	5–2	—	5–2	11–9
Washington	5–2	9–10	3–4	6–1	2–5	1–5	13–6	2–4	8–11	11–8	5–2	4–2	2–4	2–5	—	9–11

The October 1 tiebreaker games were regular-season games that are included here.

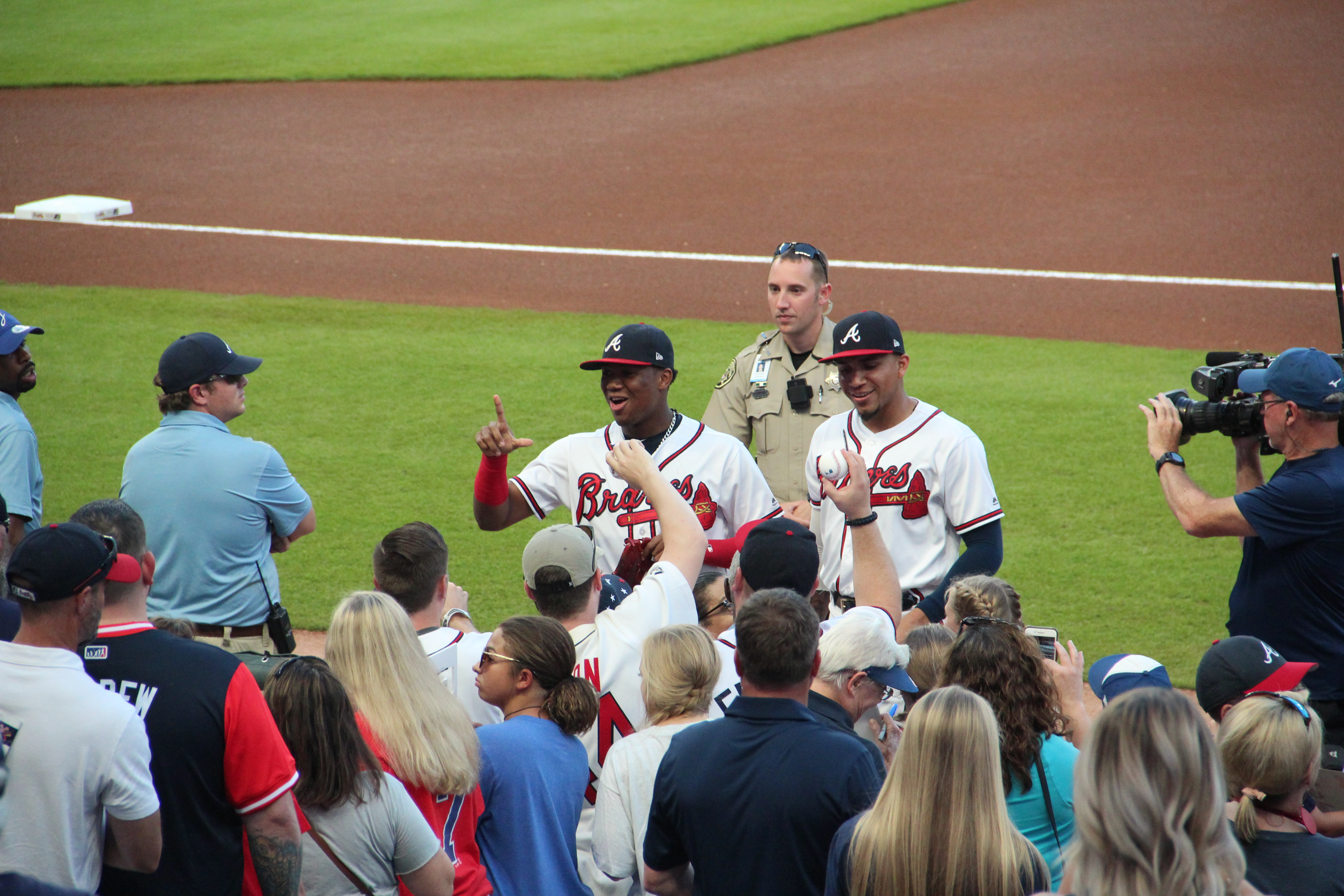
Ronald Acuña Jr. (left) and Johan Camargo (right) signing autographs, September 18, 2018

== Postseason ==
=== Game log ===
2018 postseason game log: 1–3 (Home: 1–1; Away: 0–2)
NLDS: 1–3 (Home: 1–1; Away: 0–2)

#	Date	Opponent	Score	Win	Loss	Save	Attendance	Record
1	October 4	@ Dodgers	0–6	Ryu (1–0)	Foltynewicz (0–1)	—	59,947	0–1
2	October 5	@ Dodgers	0–3	Kershaw (1–0)	Sánchez (0–1)	Jansen (1)	54,452	0–2
3	October 7	Dodgers	6–5	Toussaint (1–0)	Wood (0–1)	Vizcaíno (1)	42,385	1–2
4	October 8	Dodgers	2–6	Madson (1–0)	Venters (0–1)	—	39,586	1–3

=== Postseason rosters ===
Playoff rosters
National League Division Series

- Pitchers: 15 Sean Newcomb 19 Aníbal Sánchez 26 Mike Foltynewicz 33 A. J. Minter 38 Arodys Vizcaíno 45 Kevin Gausman 46 Brad Brach 48 Jonny Venters 49 Julio Teherán 54 Max Fried 61 Chad Sobotka 62 Touki Toussaint
- Catchers: 12 René Rivera 24 Kurt Suzuki 25 Tyler Flowers
- Infielders: 1 Ozzie Albies 5 Freddie Freeman 16 Charlie Culberson 17 Johan Camargo 20 Lucas Duda 27 Ryan Flaherty
- Outfielders: 11 Ender Inciarte 13 Ronald Acuña Jr. 18 Lane Adams 22 Nick Markakis

== Roster ==
2018 Atlanta Braves
Roster
Pitchers: 36 Kolby Allard; 63 Jesse Biddle; 46 Brad Brach; 57 Rex Brothers; 51 Shane Carle; 26 Mike Foltynewicz; 39 Sam Freeman; 54 Max Fried; 45 Kevin Gausman; 53 Luiz Gohara; 64 Luke Jackson; 32 Brandon McCarthy; 68 Adam McCreery; 33 A. J. Minter; 30 Peter Moylan; 15 Sean Newcomb; 67 Wes Parsons; 61 Evan Phillips; 52 José Ramírez; 71 Josh Ravin; 19 Aníbal Sánchez; 50 Lucas Sims; 61 Chad Sobotka; 48 Miguel Socolovich; 40 Mike Soroka; 49 Julio Teherán; 62 Touki Toussaint; 48 Jonny Venters; 38 Arodys Vizcaíno; 46 Chase Whitley; 72 Bryse Wilson; 58 Daniel Winkler; 45 Matt Wisler; 73 Kyle Wright	Catchers: 25 Tyler Flowers; 61 Carlos Pérez; 12 René Rivera; 8 Chris Stewart; 24 Kurt Suzuki; Infielders: 1 Ozzie Albies; 23 José Bautista; 17 Johan Camargo; 16 Charlie Culberson; 20 Lucas Duda; 27 Ryan Flaherty; 5 Freddie Freeman; 14 Rio Ruiz; 7 Dansby Swanson	Outfielders: 13 Ronald Acuña Jr.; 18 Lane Adams; 12 Peter Bourjos; 23 Adam Duvall; 11 Ender Inciarte; 22 Nick Markakis; 57 Michael Reed; 23 Danny Santana; 8,20 Preston Tucker; Other batters: 18 Dustin Peterson	Manager: 43 Brian Snitker; Coaches: 59 José Castro (assistant hitting); 60 Sal Fasano (catching coach); 55 Chuck Hernandez (pitching); 34 Marty Reed (bullpen); 28 Kevin Seitzer (hitting); -- Dave Wallace (special assistant to pitching); 37 Ron Washington (third base); 4 Walt Weiss (bench); 99 José Yepez (bullpen catcher); 2 Eric Young (first base)

== Statistics ==
=== Batting ===
Players in bold are on the active MLB roster as of the 2022 season.

Note: G = Games played; AB = At bats; R = Runs; H = Hits; 2B = Doubles; 3B = Triples; HR = Home runs; RBI = Runs batted in; AVG = Batting average; OBP = On-base percentage; SLG = Slugging percentage; SB = Stolen bases

Player	G	AB	R	H	2B	3B	HR	RBI	AVG	OBP	SLG	SB
**Freddie Freeman**	162	618	94	191	44	4	23	98	.309	.388	.505	10
Nick Markakis	162	623	78	185	43	2	14	93	.297	.366	.440	1
**Ozzie Albies**	158	639	105	167	40	5	24	72	.261	.305	.452	14
**Ender Inciarte**	156	597	83	158	27	6	10	61	.265	.325	.380	28
**Dansby Swanson**	136	478	51	114	25	4	14	59	.238	.304	.395	10
**Johan Camargo**	134	464	63	126	27	1	19	76	.272	.349	.457	1
**Kurt Suzuki**	105	347	45	94	24	0	12	50	.271	.332	.444	0
Preston Tucker	80	129	15	31	10	0	4	22	.240	.303	.411	0
**Charlie Culberson**	113	296	47	80	18	2	12	45	.270	.326	.466	4
Ryan Flaherty	81	161	17	35	6	0	2	13	.217	.298	.292	4
Peter Bourjos	36	44	5	9	2	1	1	4	.205	.239	.364	0
Tyler Flowers	82	251	34	57	9	0	8	30	.227	.341	.359	0
**Ronald Acuña Jr.**	111	433	78	127	26	4	26	64	.293	.366	.552	16
**Adam Duvall**	33	53	8	7	1	0	0	0	.132	.193	.151	0
Lane Adams	26	25	10	6	1	0	2	6	.240	.345	.520	1
José Bautista	12	35	3	5	1	0	2	5	.143	.250	.343	0
Carlos Pérez	8	21	0	3	0	0	0	0	.143	.182	.143	0
Danny Santana	15	28	4	5	3	0	0	2	.179	.281	.286	1
Lucas Duda	20	18	1	4	2	0	1	2	.222	.364	.500	0
Rio Ruiz	14	12	1	1	0	0	0	0	.083	.267	.083	0
Chris Stewart	5	14	3	3	0	0	0	3	.214	.250	.214	0
Michael Reed	7	7	1	2	0	0	0	0	.286	.286	.286	0
Dustin Peterson	2	2	0	0	0	0	0	0	.000	.000	.000	0
Pitcher totals	162	283	13	23	5	0	1	12	.081	.106	.110	0
**Team totals**	**162**	**5582**	**759**	**1433**	**314**	**29**	**175**	**717**	**.257**	**.324**	**.417**	**90**

=== Pitching ===
Players in bold are on the active MLB roster as of 2022.

Note: W = Wins; L = Losses; ERA = Earned run average; G = Games pitched; GS = Games started; SV = Saves; IP = Innings pitched; H = Hits allowed; R = Runs allowed; ER = Earned runs allowed; HR = Home runs allowed; BB = Walks allowed; K = Strikeouts

Player	W	L	ERA	G	GS	SV	IP	H	R	ER	HR	BB	K
**Sean Newcomb**	12	9	3.90	31	30	0	164.0	137	74	71	18	81	160
Brandon McCarthy	6	3	4.92	15	15	0	78.2	94	45	43	15	21	65
Mike Foltynewicz	13	10	2.85	31	31	0	183.0	130	65	58	17	68	202
Julio Teherán	9	9	3.94	31	31	0	175.2	122	80	77	26	84	162
**Kevin Gausman**	5	3	2.87	10	10	0	59.2	50	23	19	5	18	44
Shane Carle	4	1	2.86	53	0	1	63.0	50	22	20	2	27	43
**A. J. Minter**	4	3	3.23	65	0	15	61.1	57	23	22	3	22	69
**Aníbal Sánchez**	7	6	2.83	25	24	0	136.2	106	48	43	15	42	135
Dan Winkler	4	0	3.43	69	0	2	60.1	52	27	23	3	20	69
Mike Soroka	2	1	3.51	5	5	0	25.2	30	14	10	1	7	21
**Arodys Vizcaíno**	2	2	2.11	39	0	16	38.1	30	9	9	4	15	40
Sam Freeman	3	5	4.29	63	0	0	50.1	41	26	24	3	32	58
Jesse Biddle	6	1	3.11	60	0	1	63.2	50	26	22	6	31	67
Luke Jackson	1	2	4.43	35	0	1	40.2	41	22	20	3	21	46
**Matt Wisler**	1	1	5.40	7	3	0	26.2	30	16	16	6	5	21
Rex Brothers	0	0	inf	1	0	0	0.0	0	1	1	0	2	0
**Touki Toussaint**	2	1	4.03	7	5	0	29.0	18	13	13	1	21	32
Brad Brach	1	2	1.52	27	0	1	23.2	22	8	4	1	9	22
Jonny Venters	4	1	3.54	28	0	2	20.1	15	9	8	0	10	16
Chad Sobotka	1	0	1.88	14	0	0	14.1	5	3	3	2	9	21
**Kolby Allard**	1	1	12.38	3	1	0	8.0	19	12	11	3	4	3
**Bryse Wilson**	1	0	6.43	3	1	0	7.0	8	5	5	0	6	6
**Evan Phillips**	0	0	8.53	4	0	0	6.1	6	6	6	3	4	3
**Kyle Wright**	0	0	4.50	4	0	0	6.0	4	3	3	2	6	5
Wes Parsons	0	1	7.20	1	0	0	5.0	6	4	4	1	3	3
**Charlie Culberson**	0	0	9.00	1	0	0	1.0	2	1	1	0	0	0
Adam McCreery	0	0	18.00	1	0	0	1.0	4	2	2	0	0	2
**Lucas Sims**	0	0	7.84	6	0	0	10.1	12	9	9	2	8	10
Chase Whitley	0	0	18.00	1	0	0	1.0	2	2	2	1	1	1
Luiz Gohara	0	1	5.95	9	1	1	19.2	16	13	13	3	8	18
Peter Moylan	0	1	4.45	39	0	0	28.1	32	14	14	4	18	23
Josh Ravin	0	1	6.00	2	0	0	3.0	2	2	2	0	2	1
Miguel Socolovich	0	1	10.80	4	0	0	5.0	8	6	6	0	2	4
**Max Fried**	1	4	2.94	14	5	0	33.2	26	12	11	3	20	44
José Ramírez	0	2	17.05	7	0	0	6.1	9	12	12	0	8	7
**Team totals**	**90**	**72**	**3.75**	**162**	**162**	**40**	**1456.2**	**1236**	**657**	**607**	**153**	**635**	**1423**

== Farm system ==
Level	Team	League	Manager
AAA	Gwinnett Stripers	International League	Damon Berryhill
AA	Mississippi Braves	Southern League	Chris Maloney
A-Advanced	Florida Fire Frogs	Florida State League	Luis Salazar
A	Rome Braves	South Atlantic League	Ralph "Rocket" Wheeler
Rookie	Danville Braves	Appalachian League	Barrett Kleinknecht
Rookie	GCL Braves	Gulf Coast League	Nestor Pérez
Rookie	DSL Braves	Dominican Summer League	Francisco Santiesteban
