= Orlando Arcia =

Venezuelan baseball player (born 1994)

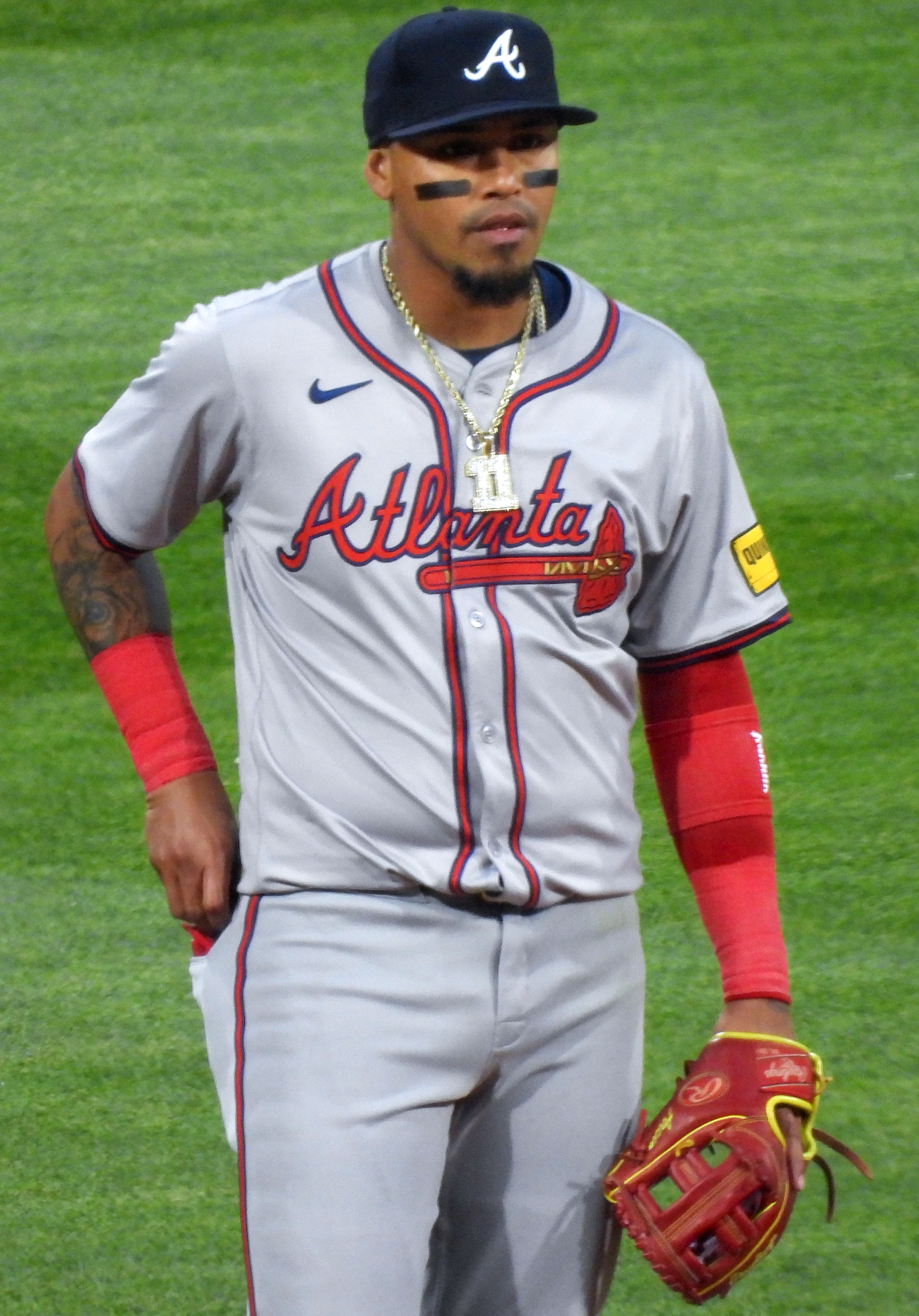
- Arcia with the Braves in 2024

Free agent
- Shortstop
- Born: August 4, 1994 (age 32); Anaco, Anzoátegui, Venezuela
- Bats: Right Throws: Right

MLB debut
- August 2, 2016, for the Milwaukee Brewers

MLB statistics (through 2026 season)
- Batting average: .240
- Home runs: 91
- Runs batted in: 349
- Stats at Baseball Reference

Teams
- Milwaukee Brewers (2016–2021); Atlanta Braves (2021–2025); Colorado Rockies (2025); Minnesota Twins (2026)

Career highlights and awards
- All-Star (2023); World Series champion (2021)

Orlando Jesús Arcia (born August 4, 1994) is a Venezuelan professional baseball shortstop who is a free agent. He has previously played in Major League Baseball (MLB) for the Milwaukee Brewers, Atlanta Braves, Colorado Rockies, and Minnesota Twins. The Brewers signed Arcia as an international free agent in 2010 and he made his MLB debut with them in 2016. He was traded to the Atlanta Braves during the 2021 season. In 2023, Arcia was named to his first All-Star game.

== Career ==
=== Milwaukee Brewers ===
The Milwaukee Brewers signed Arcia as an international free agent on October 22, 2010. He made his professional debut in 2011 with the Dominican Summer League Brewers. He missed the 2012 season due to a broken ankle he suffered during spring training. Arcia returned in 2013 to play for the Wisconsin Timber Rattlers of the Single-A Midwest League and played for the Brevard County Manatees of the High-A Florida State League in 2014. He spent the 2015 season with the Biloxi Shuckers of the Double-A Southern League. In July, he played in the 2015 All-Star Futures Game. After hitting .307/.347/.453 with eight home runs, Arcia was named the Brewers Minor League Player of the Year for 2015. On November 20, 2015, the Brewers added Arcia to their 40-man roster in order to protect him from the Rule 5 draft. He also spent 2014 and 2015 playing for the Caribes de Anzoategui of the Venezuelan Professional Baseball League, a winter league held during MLB's offseason.

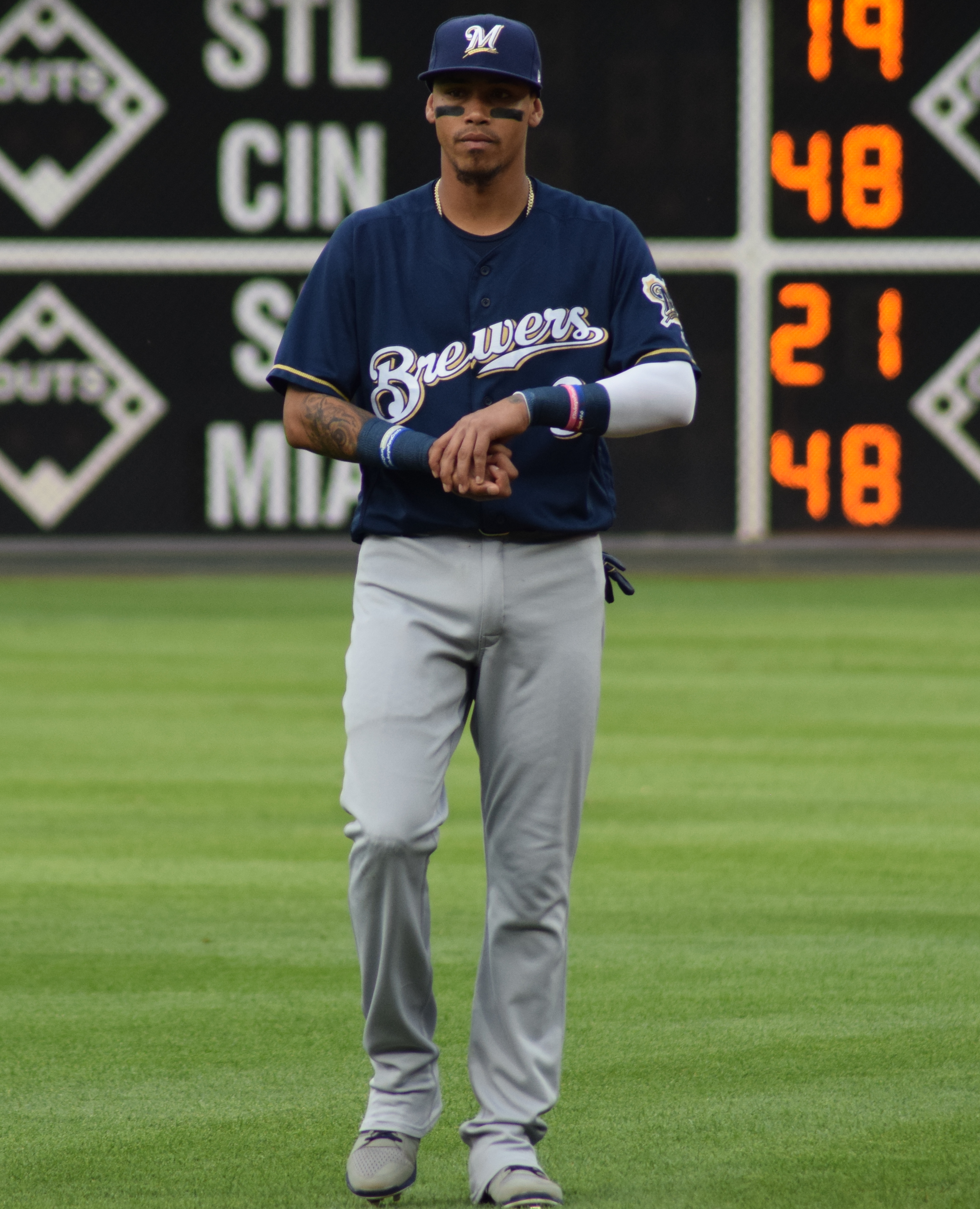
Arcia with the Brewers in 2018

Arcia began the 2016 season with the Colorado Springs Sky Sox of the Triple-A Pacific Coast League. He made his major league debut on August 2, 2016. In 55 games for the Brewers, he hit .219/.273/.358 with 4 home runs and 17 RBI. The following season, Arcia made 153 appearances for the Brewers; he hit .277/.324/.407 with 15 home runs, 53 RBI, and 14 stolen bases.

On July 1, 2018, Arcia was demoted to Triple-A for the second time in the season. He was hitting .197 before the demotion. Arcia was recalled on July 26 and rebounded to finish the season hitting .236/.268/.307 with three home runs and 30 RBI, including two walk-off singles. In Game 3 of the 2018 NLDS against the Colorado Rockies, he homered off of Wade Davis to extend the Brewers' lead in their eventual series-clinching 6–0 victory. In Game 2 of the NLCS, Arcia homered off of Hyun-jin Ryu to start the scoring, but the Brewers would lose that game to Los Angeles 4–3.

In 2019, Arcia batted .223/.283/.350 with 15 home runs, and 59 RBI. After the season, the Brewers acquired shortstop Luis Urías and had Arcia and Urías platoon at shortstop in 2020. He appeared in 59 games in the COVID-19-shortened season, batting .260/.317/.416 with 5 home runs and 20 RBI in 173 at-bats.

=== Atlanta Braves ===
On April 6, 2021, the Brewers traded Arcia to the Atlanta Braves in exchange for Patrick Weigel and Chad Sobotka. The Braves assigned Arcia to the Triple-A Gwinnett Stripers. On July 3, he was recalled from Gwinnett. Arcia and Sean Newcomb were optioned to Gwinnett on July 31, as trade acquisitions Jorge Soler and Richard Rodríguez joined the team. When rosters expanded in September 2021, Arcia rejoined the Atlanta Braves. In 2021 in the majors, between the two teams he batted .198/.258/.309 with 2 home runs and 14 RBIs in 81 at bats. The Braves finished with an 88–73 record, clinching the NL East, and eventually won the 2021 World Series, giving the Braves their first title since 1995.

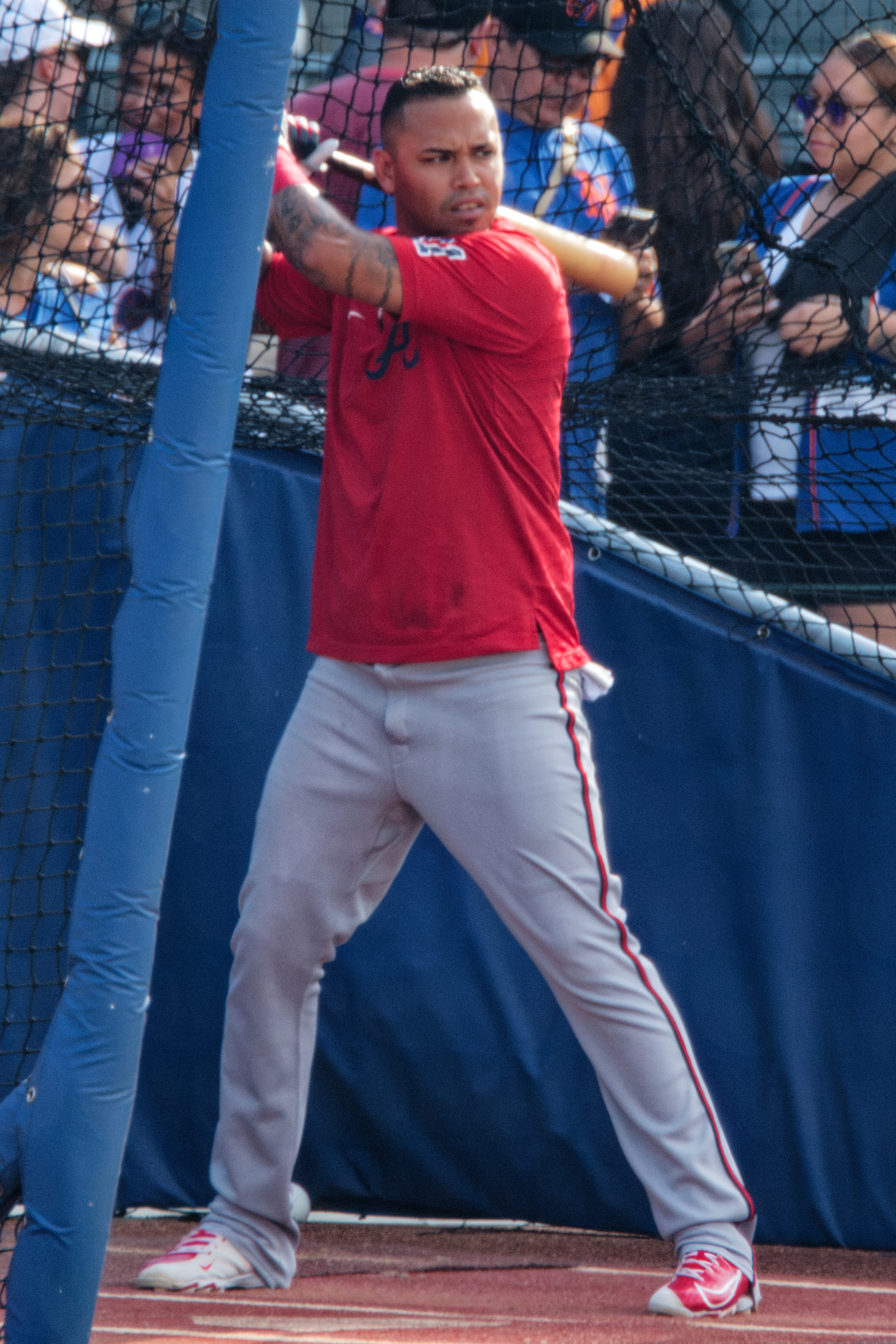
Arcia in 2022

On November 30, 2021, Arcia and the Braves agreed to a two-year contract worth $3 million. In 2022, Following an injury to Ozzie Albies, Arcia became the Braves' starting second baseman. During a game against the Boston Red Sox on August 9, 2022, Arcia injured his hamstring while running the bases.

In spring training in 2023, Arcia competed against Vaughn Grissom and Braden Shewmake for the starting shortstop job. Though Grissom entered the spring as the favorite, Arcia won the position on the strength of his glove; Grissom and Shewmake were optioned to Triple-A Gwinnett on March 20, 2023. On Opening Day, Arcia and the Braves agreed to a three-year contract extension worth $7.3 million. The contract also included a team option for the 2026 season for $2 million, or a $1 million buyout. Arcia was hit by a pitch from Hunter Greene on April 12, and remained on the injured list through May 6. At the midseason, Arcia for the first time was named a starting shortstop for the National League in the 2023 Major League Baseball All-Star Game. In 139 appearances for the Braves in 2023, Arcia batted .264/.321/.420 with 17 home runs and 65 RBI.

In 2024, Arcia played in 157 games for Atlanta, batting .218/.271/.354 with 17 home runs and 46 RBI. Both Arcia and Nick Allen made the Braves' 2025 Opening Day roster. Despite initially starting, Arcia eventually lost playing time to Allen as the season progressed. In 14 games for the team, he batted .194/.219/.226 with one RBI and one walk. On May 23, 2025, Arcia was designated for assignment by the Braves. He was released by Atlanta on May 25.

=== Colorado Rockies ===
On May 28, 2025, Arcia signed a major league contract with the Colorado Rockies. With Ezequiel Tovar entrenched as the Rockies' starting shortstop, the team saw Arcia as an experienced depth option that could play second base, shortstop, and third base as needed for them. He made 62 appearances for the team, slashing .203/.242/.302 with three home runs and 12 RBI.

=== Minnesota Twins ===
On January 3, 2026, Arcia signed a minor league contract with the Minnesota Twins. He made 39 appearances for the Triple-A St. Paul Saints, batting .318/.376/.556 with eight home runs and 27 RBI. On May 19, the Twins selected Arcia's contract, adding him to their active roster. He made 18 appearances for Minnesota, slashing .271/.300/.354 with one home run and two RBI. Arcia was designated for assignment by the Twins following the promotion of Kyler Fedko on June 14. He cleared waivers and accepted an outright assignment to St. Paul on June 18. Arcia was released by the Twins on July 24.

=== Diablos Rojos del México ===
On August 4, 2026, Arcia signed with the Diablos Rojos del México of the Mexican League. He hit .111 across nine at-bats with the team.

=== Cincinnati Reds ===
On September 1, 2026, Arcia signed a minor league contract with the Cincinnati Reds. In 16 games with Triple-A Louisville Bats he batted .246/.290/.386 with 2 home runs and 11 RBIs. He elected free agency on November 2.

== Personal life ==
His older brother, outfielder Oswaldo Arcia, played in MLB from 2013 to 2016, and most recently played for the Caliente de Durango of the Mexican League.

== See also ==
- List of Major League Baseball players from Venezuela
