= Patrick Weigel =

American baseball player (born 1994)

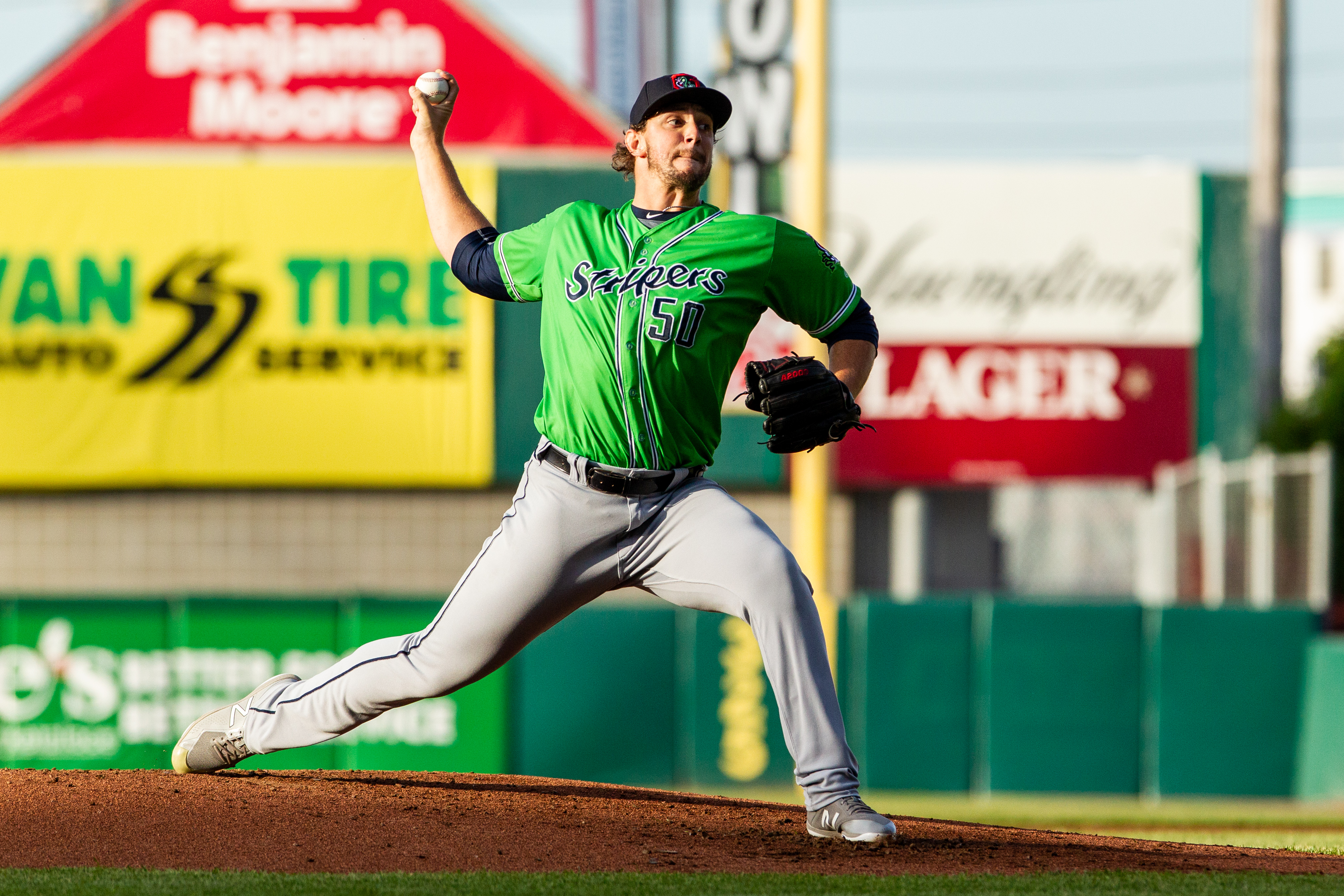
- Weigel with the Gwinnett Stripers

Free agent
- Pitcher
- Born: July 8, 1994 (age 32); Thousand Oaks, California, U.S.
- Bats: Right Throws: Right

MLB debut
- September 4, 2020, for the Atlanta Braves

MLB statistics (through 2021 season)
- Win–loss record: 0–0
- Earned run average: 7.71
- Strikeouts: 9
- Stats at Baseball Reference

Teams
- Atlanta Braves (2020); Milwaukee Brewers (2021)

Patrick Charles Weigel (born July 8, 1994) is an American professional baseball pitcher who is a free agent. He has previously played in Major League Baseball (MLB) for the Atlanta Braves and Milwaukee Brewers.

== Amateur career ==
Weigel attended St. Bonaventure High School in Ventura, California. He played college baseball at Pacific University for one year before transferring to Oxnard College. He was drafted by the Milwaukee Brewers in the 22nd round of the 2014 Major League Baseball draft, but did not sign and transferred to the University of Houston.

== Professional career ==
=== Atlanta Braves ===
After one year at Houston, the Atlanta Braves selected Weigel in the seventh round of the 2015 MLB draft. Weigel signed and made his professional debut with the Danville Braves. In 14 starts for Danville, he went 0–3 with a 4.53 ERA. He started 2016 with the Rome Braves and was promoted to the Mississippi Braves in August. He ended the 2016 season with an 11–6 record and a 2.47 ERA. In 25 games (24 starts) between the two clubs, he pitched to an 11–6 record with a 2.47 ERA. Weigel started the 2017 season with Mississippi and was promoted to the Gwinnett Braves in May. The next month, he underwent Tommy John surgery and missed the remainder of the season.

Weigel made four rehab starts in 2018. The Braves added him to their 40-man roster after the 2018 season. Weigel split the 2019 season between Mississippi and the Gwinnett Stripers, going a combined 6–2 with a 2.73 ERA and 55 strikeouts over 63.1 innings. The Braves promoted Weigel to the major leagues on three separate occasions in 2019, but he did not appear in a game for them that season. Weigel was again promoted to the major leagues on September 4, 2020, and made his major league debut against the Washington Nationals.

=== Milwaukee Brewers ===
On April 5, 2021, the Braves traded Weigel and Chad Sobotka to the Milwaukee Brewers for Orlando Arcia. On April 28, 2021, Weigel notched his first MLB strikeout, punching out Miami Marlins outfielder Magneuris Sierra. In the game, Weigel threw two scoreless innings with 4 strikeouts. On July 30, Weigel was designated for assignment by the Brewers. On August 2, Weigel was outrighted to the Triple-A Nashville Sounds. He became a free agent following the season.

=== Seattle Mariners ===
On March 14, 2022, Weigel signed a minor league contract with the Seattle Mariners organization. He spent time with the team in spring training, and was reassigned to minor league camp in March. Weigel spent the year with the Triple-A Tacoma Rainiers, making 53 appearances for the team and posting a 3-5 record and 4.21 ERA with 63 strikeouts in 62 innings pitched. He elected free agency following the season on November 10.

=== Kansas City Monarchs ===
On March 9, 2023, Weigel signed with the Kansas City Monarchs of the American Association of Professional Baseball. In 34 relief outings for Kansas City, Weigel posted a 3.86 ERA with 30 strikeouts and 10 saves across 35 innings pitched.

=== Saraperos de Saltillo ===
On November 15, 2023, Weigel signed with the Saraperos de Saltillo of the Mexican League. In 39 relief appearances, he registered a 3–1 record with a 2.87 ERA and 43 strikeouts over 37 2/3 innings.

=== Cincinnati Reds ===
On July 11, 2024, Weigel signed a minor league contract with the Cincinnati Reds. In 21 appearances split between the Double–A Chattanooga Lookouts and Triple–A Louisville Bats, accumulating a 1–5 record and 2.45 ERA with 25 strikeouts and 10 saves over 22 innings pitched. Weigel elected free agency following the season on November 4.

=== Washington Nationals ===
On December 6, 2024, Weigel signed a minor league contract with the Washington Nationals. In 31 appearances for the Triple-A Rochester Red Wings, he struggled to a 4-5 record and 8.29 ERA with 46 strikeouts and three saves across 33 2/3 innings pitched. Weigel was released by the Nationals organization on July 1, 2025.

=== Saraperos de Saltillo (second stint) ===
On July 11, 2025, Weigel signed with the Saraperos de Saltillo of the Mexican League. Weigel made 11 appearances for Saltillo, compiling a 3-1 record and 3.38 ERA with 12 strikeouts and one save across 13 1/3 innings pitched.

=== Colorado Rockies ===
On January 27, 2026, Weigel signed a minor league contract with the Colorado Rockies. In 29 games (9 starts) with Triple-A Albuquerque Isotopes he threw 48 innings going 1-2 with a 7.50 ERA and 49 strikeouts. He elected free agency on November 2.
