= Jesse Biddle =

American baseball player (born 1991)

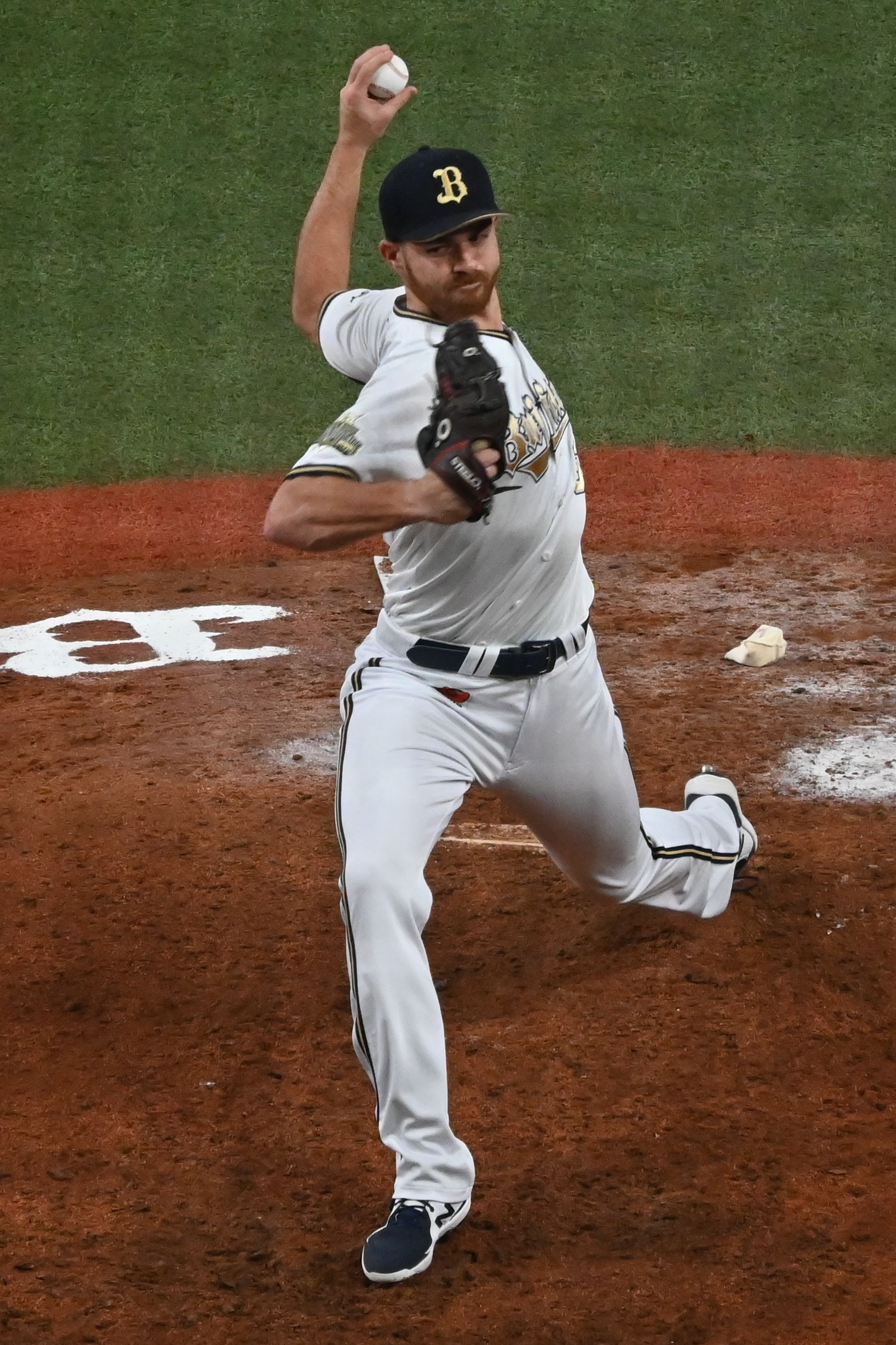
- Biddle with the Orix Buffaloes
- Pitcher
- Born: October 22, 1991 (age 34); Philadelphia, Pennsylvania, U.S.
- Batted: Left Threw: Left

Professional debut
- MLB: April 21, 2018, for the Atlanta Braves
- NPB: March 26, 2022, for the Orix Buffaloes

Last appearance
- MLB: May 16, 2021, for the Atlanta Braves
- NPB: August 31, 2022, for the Orix Buffaloes

MLB statistics
- Win–loss record: 6–2
- Earned run average: 5.07
- Strikeouts: 105

NPB statistics
- Win–loss record: 4-5
- Earned run average: 4.02
- Strikeouts: 45
- Stats at Baseball Reference

Teams
- Atlanta Braves (2018–2019); Seattle Mariners (2019); Texas Rangers (2019); Cincinnati Reds (2020); Atlanta Braves (2021); Orix Buffaloes (2022)

Career highlights and awards
- Japan Series Champion (2022)

Jesse Thomas Biddle (born October 22, 1991) is an American former professional baseball pitcher. He was selected in the first round of the 2010 MLB draft by the Philadelphia Phillies and played in Major League Baseball (MLB) for the Atlanta Braves, Seattle Mariners, Texas Rangers, and Cincinnati Reds. He also played in Nippon Professional Baseball (NPB) for the Orix Buffaloes.

== Amateur career ==
Biddle grew up in the Mount Airy neighborhood of Philadelphia, Pennsylvania, and he attended Germantown Friends School, a Quaker School in the neighboring Germantown neighborhood of Philadelphia. He competed in the Friends School League. As a junior, Biddle had a 5–0 win–loss record with a 0.64 earned run average (ERA) and 61 strikeouts in 33 innings pitched; in his senior year, he was 9–2 with a 1.04 ERA, striking out 140 batters in 59 1/3 innings.

== Professional career ==
=== Philadelphia Phillies ===
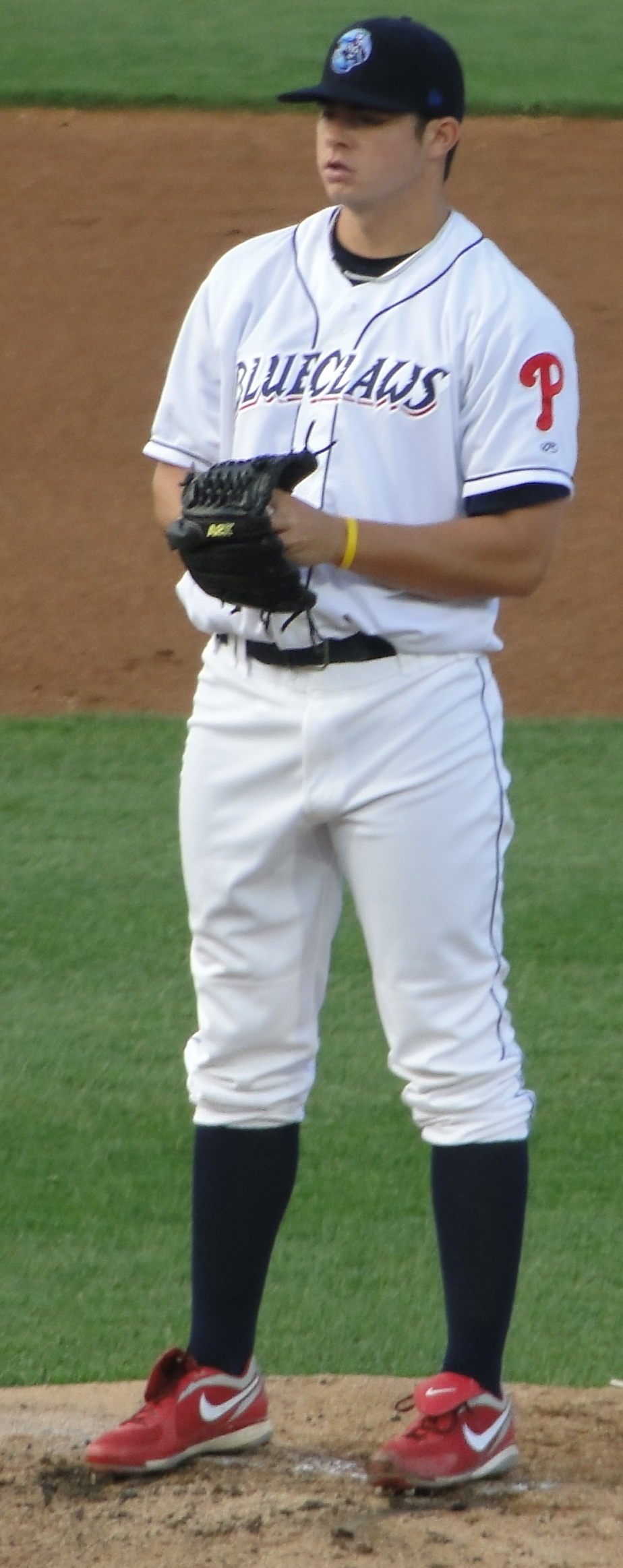
Biddle pitching for the Lakewood BlueClaws

The Philadelphia Phillies selected Biddle in the first round, with the 27th overall pick, of the 2010 Major League Baseball draft. Although he had committed to attend the University of Oregon, he agreed to a contract with the Phillies on June 10, with a signing bonus of $1.16 million.

In his first season, he amassed a 3–1 win–loss record, 4.32 ERA, 41 strikeouts, and 9 walks in 33 1/3 innings pitched for the Gulf Coast League Phillies. He also pitched in three games for the Williamsport Crosscutters that year. In 2011, Biddle pitched for the Lakewood BlueClaws where he was 7–8 with a 2.98 ERA in 25 games (24 starts). That same year, Baseball America named Biddle the #2 prospect in the Phillies organization, and in 2012 Baseball America named Biddle the #1 prospect in the Phillies organization. He spent 2012 with the Clearwater Threshers where he posted a 10–6 record and 3.22 ERA in 26 starts.

On April 22, 2013, with the Reading Fightin' Phils, Biddle posted 16 strikeouts in a game in Harrisburg against the Senators, breaking the previous record of 13 for his team. He spent the whole season with Reading, going 5–14 with a 3.64 ERA in 27 starts. He began 2014 with Clearwater, and after two games where he was 2–0 with a 0.90 ERA, he was promoted back to Reading. In May of 2014, Biddle was hit by hail during a storm and dealt with headaches as a side effect, forcing him to miss a start for precautionary reasons. It was later reported to have caused a concussion that Biddle struggled pitching with - in five starts following the incident, he had an 0-5 record and accrued a 9.82 ERA. Phillies management were uncertain about the severity of the head injury but shut him down for a "mental break" in June. He finished the season in Reading, compiling a 3–10 record and 5.03 ERA in 16 games started.

Biddle began 2015 with Reading and on July 7, 2015, he was promoted to the Lehigh Valley IronPigs. The next day, he made his Lehigh Valley debut, giving up seven earned runs on five hits and six walks in 2 1/3 innings pitched. In 24 starts between the two teams, he was 9–6 with a 4.95 ERA and 1.66 WHIP. Following the 2015 season, Biddle underwent Tommy John surgery.

=== Atlanta Braves ===
On February 3, 2016, the Phillies traded Biddle to the Pittsburgh Pirates for Yoervis Medina. The Pirates designated him for assignment on March 11. Biddle was claimed off waivers by the Atlanta Braves on March 19. He did not pitch at all in 2016 due to his Tommy John surgery. He returned in 2017 and pitched for the Mississippi Braves, compiling a 2–4 record and 2.90 ERA in 49.2 relief innings pitched. He began 2018 with the Gwinnett Stripers.

The Braves promoted Biddle to the major leagues on April 18, 2018. He debuted in relief on April 21, throwing one inning against the New York Mets, and earning the win. Biddle recorded his first major league hit, a RBI double, against the Phillies on April 29, 2018, along with pitching two scoreless innings. On May 15, 2019, he was designated for assignment after posting an ERA of 5.40 in 11 2/3 innings.

=== Seattle Mariners ===
Biddle was traded to the Seattle Mariners along with Arodys Vizcaino in exchange for Anthony Swarzak and cash considerations on May 20, 2019. On June 23, he was designated for assignment.

=== Texas Rangers ===
On June 28, 2019, Biddle was claimed off waivers by the Texas Rangers and formally placed on the roster on July 1, 2019. Biddle was placed in the injured list on July 16 due to elbow inflammation, which ended his season. Biddle was outrighted off the Rangers roster on October 31, 2019.

=== Cincinnati Reds ===
On January 17, 2020, Biddle signed a minor league contract with the Cincinnati Reds. On August 25, 2020, Biddle's contract was selected to the active roster. On October 14, 2020, Biddle was outrighted off of the 40-man roster. He elected free agency two days later on October 16. On December 11, 2020, Biddle re-signed with the Reds on a minor league contract. On March 26, 2021, Biddle was released by the Reds.

=== Atlanta Braves (second stint) ===
On April 5, 2021, Biddle signed a minor league contract with the Atlanta Braves organization. On April 17, Biddle was selected to the active roster. After recording an 8.44 ERA in eight appearances, Biddle was designated for assignment on May 17. He was outrighted to the Triple-A Gwinnett Stripers on May 19. He elected free agency on October 5.

=== Orix Buffaloes ===
On December 17, 2021, Biddle signed with the Orix Buffaloes of Nippon Professional Baseball. Biddle appeared in 35 games for Orix in 2022, pitching to a 4–5 record and 4.02 ERA with 45 strikeouts in 40.1 innings of work. He became a free agent following the season.

=== Arizona Diamondbacks ===
On January 24, 2023, Biddle signed a minor league contract with the Arizona Diamondbacks organization. He made 8 appearances for the Triple-A Reno Aces, but struggled immensely to a 14.29 ERA with 6 strikeouts in 5.2 innings pitched. Biddle was released by the Diamondbacks on May 2.

On June 3, 2023, Biddle announced his retirement from professional baseball.

== Repertoire ==
Biddle's main pitch is his four-seam fastball, which he can throw up to 96 miles per hour (154 km/h), and throws comfortably in the 90–93 mph range. He has a changeup and a slider, both of which he throws in the low 80s, a 12-to-6 curveball in the low-to-mid 70s, and a two-seam fastball in the mid-to-high 80s.

== Personal ==
Biddle grew up in Mount Airy with his parents, David and Marion, and his brothers, Sam and Conor. He was a fan of the Phillies and attended the 2008 World Series while in high school.

Biddle and his wife Annie married in October 2021.
