= Chad Sobotka =

American baseball player (born 1993)

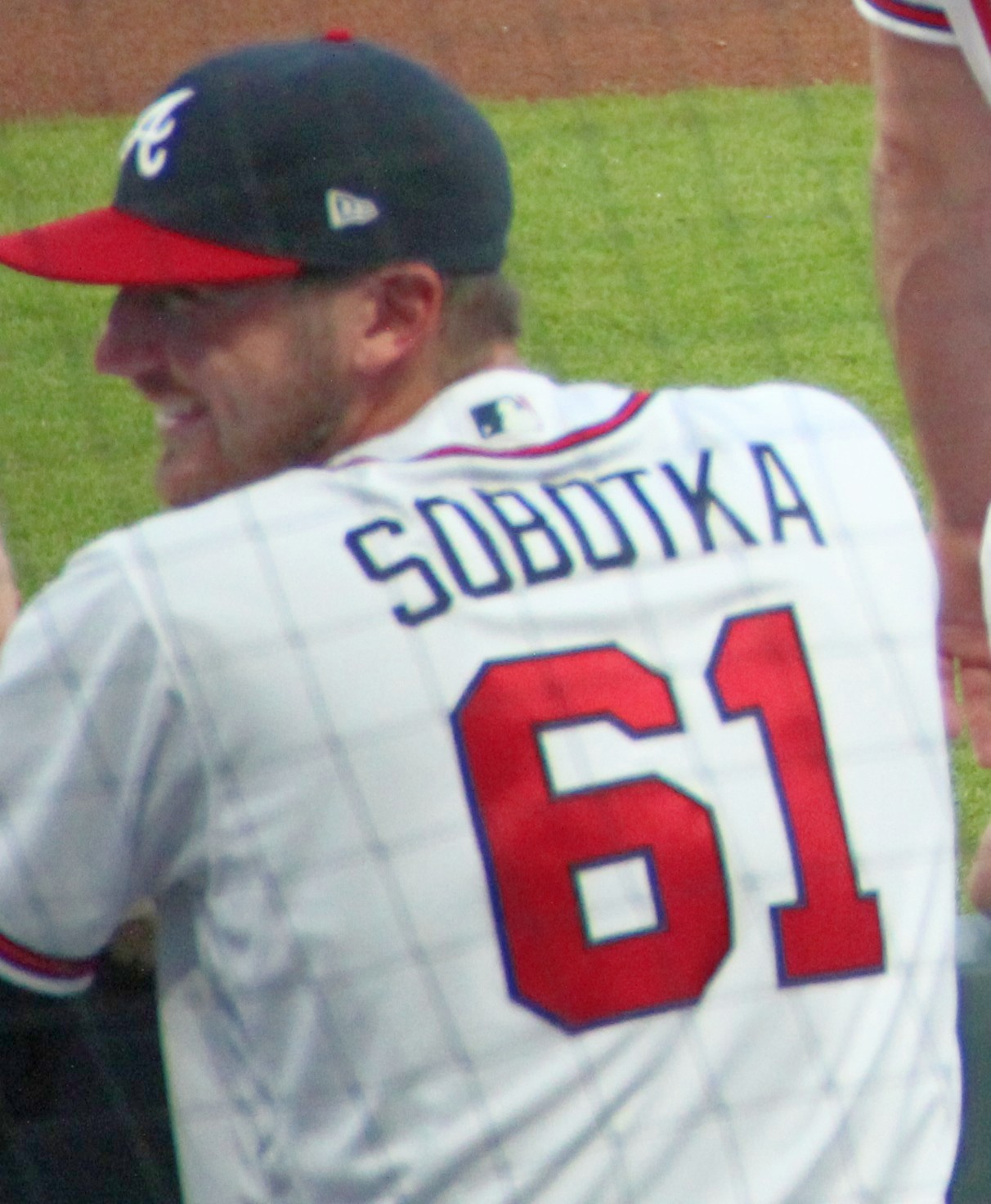
- Sobotka with the Atlanta Braves in 2018
- Pitcher
- Born: July 10, 1993 (age 33); Sarasota, Florida, U.S.
- Batted: Right Threw: Right

MLB debut
- August 10, 2018, for the Atlanta Braves

Last MLB appearance
- September 5, 2020, for the Atlanta Braves

MLB statistics
- Win–loss record: 1–0
- Earned run average: 5.36
- Strikeouts: 61
- Stats at Baseball Reference

Teams
- Atlanta Braves (2018–2020)

Chad Nicholas Sobotka (born July 10, 1993) is an American former professional baseball pitcher. He played in Major League Baseball (MLB) for the Atlanta Braves.

== Early life ==
Chad Sobotka was born in Sarasota, Florida, on July 10, 1993, to parents David and Kim. He has a brother Matt and a sister Stefanie.

== Career ==
=== Amateur career ===
Sobotka attended Riverview High School in Sarasota, Florida, where he first became a pitcher. Sobotka attended the University of South Carolina Upstate, playing for the Spartans baseball team. In his first collegiate season, Sobotka saved twelve games, pitched 31 1/3 innings, and recorded a .196 batting average against, a 1.72 earned run average, and 34 strikeouts. The next year, Sobotka made 26 appearances, with a 3.86 earned run average and .225 batting average against in 37 1/3 innings pitched. In 2013, he played collegiate summer baseball with the Chatham Anglers of the Cape Cod Baseball League. Sobotka sat out the 2014 season with a stress fracture in his back.

=== Atlanta Braves ===
The Atlanta Braves selected Sobotka in the fourth round of the 2014 Major League Baseball draft. Sobotka received a signing bonus of $400,000 from the organization. Upon his selection by the Braves, Sobotka became the first Spartan baseball player to be drafted as high as the fourth round. The Braves assigned Sobotka to the Rome Braves in 2015. During his first season, Sobotka missed two months due to injury. He returned to Rome at the start of the 2016 season. In July, Sobotka was promoted to the Carolina Mudcats, and ended the season with the Mississippi Braves. Sobotka was placed on the Mississippi Braves' Opening Day roster in 2017, and also spent time with the Florida Fire Frogs. In the Southern League, Sobotka pitched to a 5.52 ERA. His Florida State League earned run average was 6.75. Sobotka started the 2018 season on the Fire Frogs' roster. He joined the Mississippi Braves on May 15, prior to his selection as a Florida State League All-Star. On July 21, 2018, Sobotka was promoted to the Gwinnett Stripers, making his International League debut three days later.

On August 10, 2018, the Braves promoted Sobotka to the major leagues. He faced the Milwaukee Brewers later that night, pitching one inning in relief of Kevin Gausman and recording his first career strikeout. In 2019 for Atlanta, Sobotka made 32 appearances, pitching to an ugly 6.21 ERA with 38 strikeouts in 29.0 innings pitched. In 2020, Sobotka only appeared in 4 games for the Braves, recording a ghastly 12.27 ERA with only 2 strikeouts in 3.2 innings of work.

=== Milwaukee Brewers ===
On April 6, 2021, the Braves traded Sobotka and Patrick Weigel to the Milwaukee Brewers for Orlando Arcia. On June 16, Sobotka was outrighted off of the 40-man roster without making a major league appearance for Milwaukee.

=== Gastonia Honey Hunters ===
On June 22, 2022, Sobotka signed with the Gastonia Honey Hunters of the Atlantic League of Professional Baseball. He made 11 appearances for Gastonia, allowing zero runs and striking out 15 across 11.0 innings pitched. On July 25, Sobotka retired from professional baseball.

== Pitching style ==
Sobotka is known for the speed of his fastball. During the 2017 minor league season, Sobotka issued five walks per nine innings pitched, a rate that was reduced in 2018 when he adjusted the grip on his slider.
