= Dan Winkler =

American baseball player (born 1990)

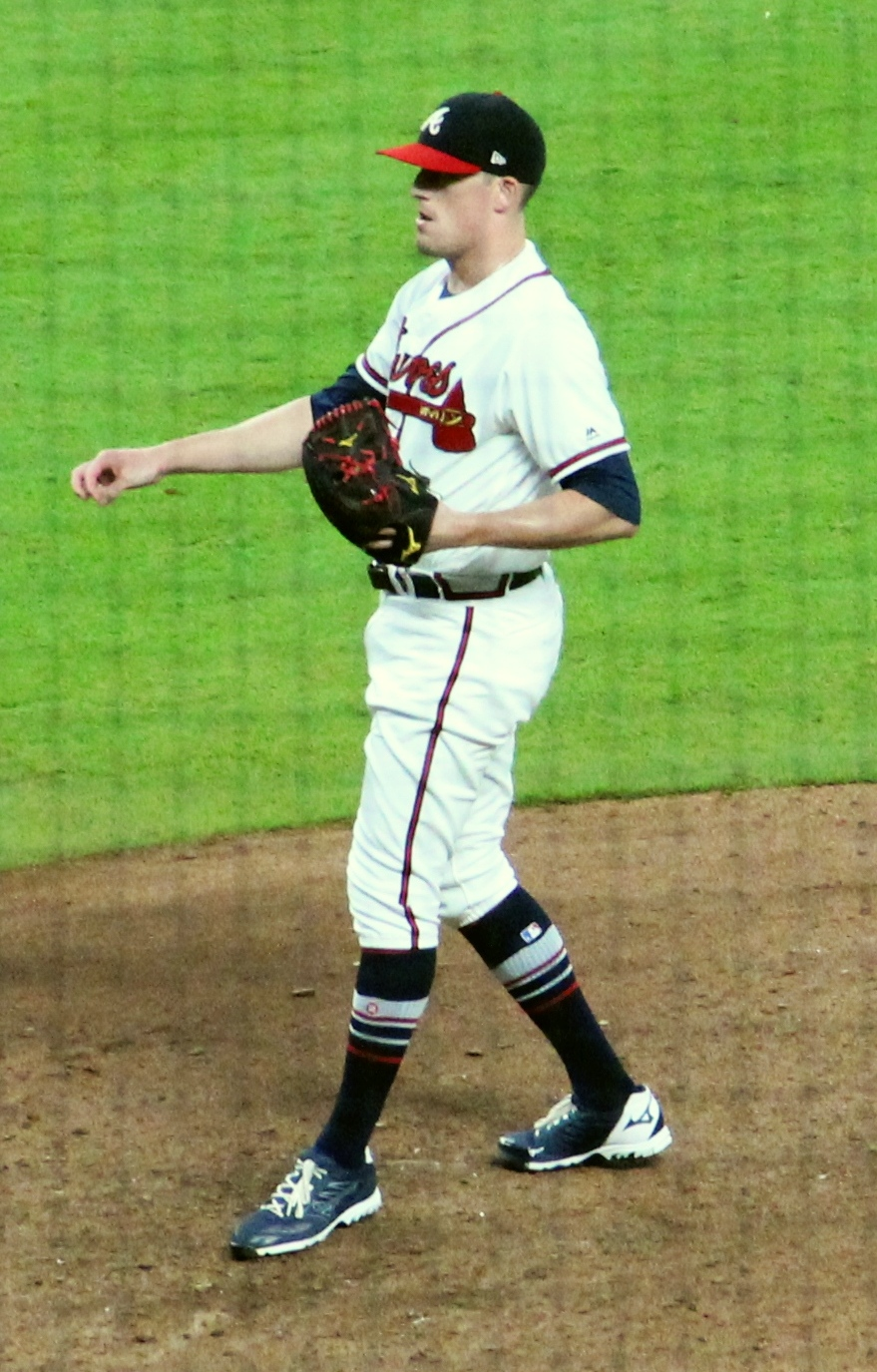
- Winkler with the Atlanta Braves in 2018
- Pitcher
- Born: February 2, 1990 (age 36); Effingham, Illinois, U.S.
- Batted: Right Threw: Right

MLB debut
- September 21, 2015, for the Atlanta Braves

Last MLB appearance
- August 16, 2021, for the Chicago Cubs

MLB statistics
- Win–loss record: 9–5
- Earned run average: 3.98
- Strikeouts: 173
- Stats at Baseball Reference

Teams
- Atlanta Braves (2015–2019); Chicago Cubs (2020–2021)

Daniel Allen Winkler (born February 2, 1990) is an American former professional baseball pitcher. He played in Major League Baseball (MLB) for the Atlanta Braves and Chicago Cubs.

== Career ==
Winkler attended St. Anthony High School in Effingham, Illinois. He then attended Parkland College and was drafted by the Chicago Cubs in the 43rd round of the 2010 Major League Baseball draft, but did not sign and instead transferred to the University of Central Florida (UCF) to play for the UCF Knights. In 2011, his junior season, he went 3–4 with a 4.70 ERA in 18 games.

=== Colorado Rockies ===
Winkler was then drafted by the Colorado Rockies in the 20th round of the 2011 Major League Baseball draft and signed.

Winkler made his professional debut for the Casper Ghosts, going 4–3 in 12 starts with a 3.92 earned run average (ERA) and 65 strikeouts over 57 1/3 innings. He spent the 2012 season with the Asheville Tourists. He started 25 games, going 11–10 with a 4.46 ERA and 136 strikeouts in 145 1/3 innings. Winkler started the 2013 season with the Modesto Nuts. On June 25, 2013, he combined with two relievers to pitch a no-hitter. He was promoted to the Tulsa Drillers near the end of the season. Overall, he was 13–7 with a 2.98 ERA and 175 strikeouts in 157 innings. The 175 strikeouts led all minor league players. He returned to Tulsa to start the 2014 season. He underwent Tommy John surgery to repair the ulnar collateral ligament of the elbow in June 2014.

=== Atlanta Braves ===
On December 11, 2014, the Atlanta Braves selected Winkler during the Rule 5 Draft. He was activated from the disabled list in September 2015. Winkler debuted on September 21, striking out two of the three New York Mets batters he faced.

Winkler fractured his elbow on April 10, 2016, while facing the St. Louis Cardinals outfielder Randal Grichuk. He missed the remainder of the 2016 season, and as a result, resolved to adjust his mechanics to lessen stress on his elbow. Winkler was reactivated in August 2017, but due to injury had not yet fulfilled the major league service time requirement mandated of Rule 5 draftees. In January 2018, the Braves signed Winkler to a one-year contract worth $610,000. For the 2018 season, Winkler posted an ERA of 3.43 in 69 games. He struck out 69 in 60 1/3 innings.

=== San Francisco Giants ===
On July 31, 2019, Winkler was traded to the San Francisco Giants along with Tristan Beck in exchange for Mark Melancon. He was designated for assignment the next day. He became a free agent after the season.

=== Chicago Cubs ===
On December 6, 2019, Winkler signed a split major league contract worth $750,000 with the Chicago Cubs. In 2020 for Chicago, Winkler pitched to a 2.95 ERA with 18 strikeouts in 18.1 innings pitched across 18 appearances.

In 47 games in 2021 for the Cubs, Winkler posted a 5.22 ERA with 40 strikeouts. On August 17, 2021, Winkler was designated for assignment by the Cubs. On August 20, Winkler was released by the Cubs.

=== Texas Rangers ===
On March 14, 2022, Winkler signed a minor league contract with the Texas Rangers. In 16 games for the Triple–A Round Rock Express, he compiled a 3.50 ERA with 26 strikeouts and 3 saves across 18 innings. Winkler opted out of his deal and became a free agent on June 1.

=== Chicago White Sox ===
On June 16, 2022, Winkler signed a minor league contract with the Chicago White Sox. In 29 relief appearances for the Triple-A Charlotte Knights, he posted a 5-0 record and 4.18 ERA with 30 strikeouts across 28 innings of work. Winkler elected free agency following the season on November 10.

== See also ==
- Rule 5 draft results
