= Arodys Vizcaíno =

Dominican baseball pitcher (born 1990)

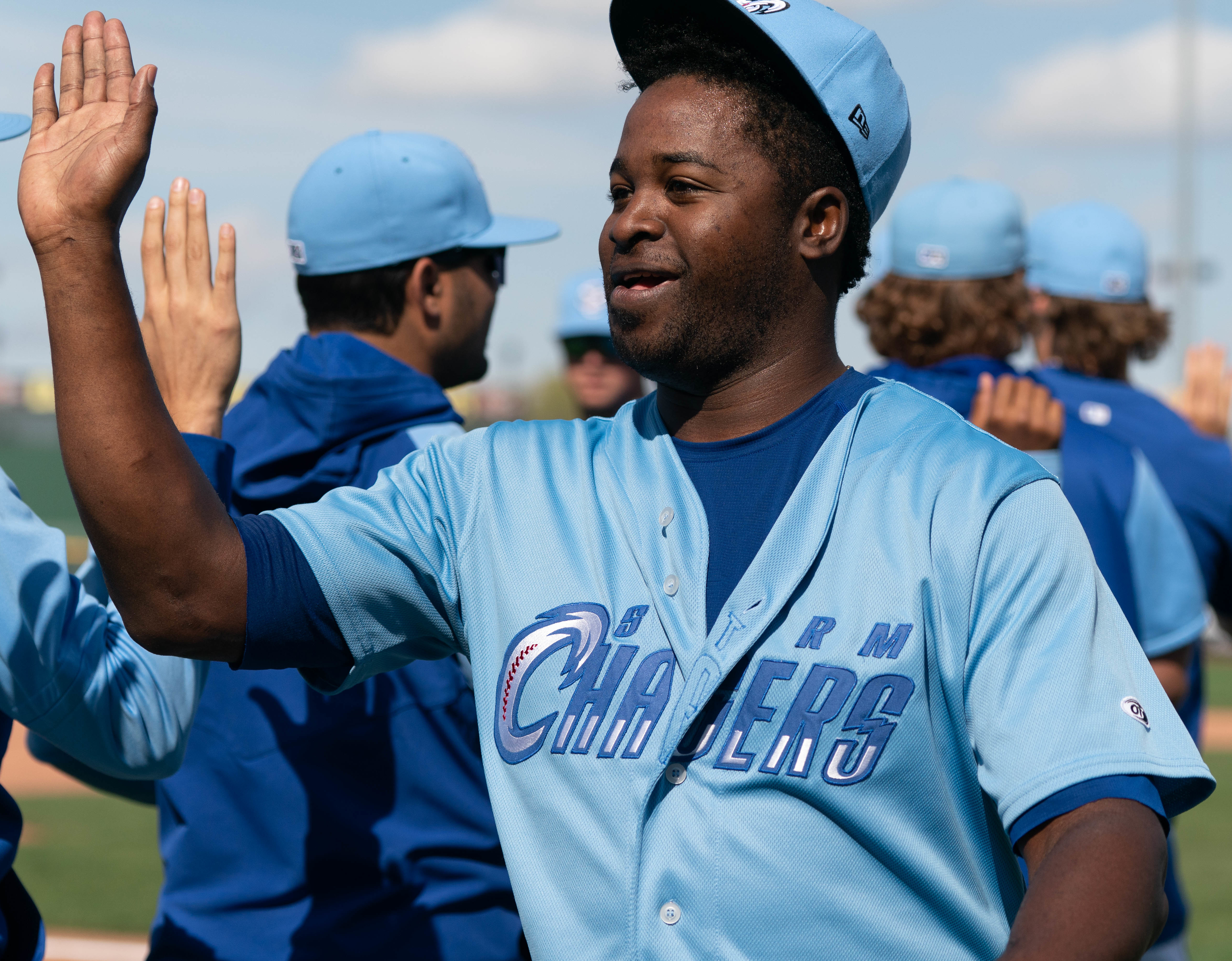
- Vizcaíno with the Omaha Storm Chasers in 2022
- Pitcher
- Born: November 13, 1990 (age 36); Yaguate, San Cristóbal, Dominican Republic
- Batted: Right Threw: Right

MLB debut
- August 10, 2011, for the Atlanta Braves

Last MLB appearance
- June 13, 2022, for the Kansas City Royals

MLB statistics
- Win–loss record: 13–11
- Earned run average: 3.11
- Strikeouts: 221
- Saves: 50
- Stats at Baseball Reference

Teams
- Atlanta Braves (2011); Chicago Cubs (2014); Atlanta Braves (2015–2019); Kansas City Royals (2022)

Arodys Vizcaíno (born November 13, 1990) is a Dominican former professional baseball pitcher. He played in Major League Baseball (MLB) for the Atlanta Braves, Chicago Cubs, and Kansas City Royals.

Originally signed by the New York Yankees as an international free agent in 2007, Vizcaíno was traded to the Atlanta Braves after the 2009 season, and made his MLB debut in 2011. He was traded to the Chicago Cubs during the 2012 season and traded back to the Braves for Tommy La Stella after the 2014 season.

== Professional career ==
=== New York Yankees (2007–09) ===
Vizcaíno signed with the New York Yankees as an international free agent on July 2, 2007. He made his professional debut with the Rookie-level Gulf Coast Yankees of the Gulf Coast League in 2008, pitching to a 3-2 win–loss record, 3.68 earned run average (ERA), with 48 strikeouts and 13 walks in 44 innings pitched over twelve games. Vizcaíno pitched for the Single-A Short Season Staten Island Yankees of the New York–Penn League in 2009, going 2–4 with a 2.13 ERA in 10 games, all starts, and striking out 52 in 42 1/3 innings. After the 2009 season, Baseball America ranked Vizcaíno as the Yankees' third best prospect, rating his curveball as the best in the Yankees' organization, and projecting him to be the Yankees' fourth starter in their 2013 rotation.

=== Atlanta Braves (2009–12) ===
Vizcaíno was traded from the Yankees to the Atlanta Braves with Melky Cabrera, Mike Dunn, and $500,000 in exchange for Javier Vázquez and Boone Logan on December 23, 2009. Baseball America rated him the 69th best prospect in baseball before the regular season began. The Braves assigned Vizcaíno to the Single-A Rome Braves of the South Atlantic League. There, he went 9–3 with a 2.34 ERA in twelve starts, striking out 66 in 69 1/3 innings. They promoted him to the Single-A Advanced Myrtle Beach Pelicans of the Carolina League, where he had a 4.63 ERA in three starts before suffering a right elbow strain that landed him on the disabled list. An examination discovered a partially torn right elbow ligament. He did not pitch for the rest of the season, ending with a 2.74 ERA overall. Baseball America rated Vizcaino as the Braves' seventh best prospect after the season.

Before the 2011 season, Baseball America rated Vizcaíno the 93rd best prospect in baseball. In 2011, Vizcaíno began the season with the Single-A Advanced Lynchburg Hillcats of the Carolina League, but was promoted to the Double-A Mississippi Braves of the Southern League and Triple-A Gwinnett Braves of the International League later that season. Across the minors, he went 5–5 with a 3.06 ERA, 100 strikeouts and 28 walks in 97 innings across three levels.

Vizcaíno was called up to the majors for the first time on August 10, 2011. He made his MLB debut that day, pitching in relief, walking two batters and hitting another in the ninth inning. Vizcaíno earned his first MLB win in the Braves' 2-1 extra-inning victory over the San Francisco Giants on August 16. In seventeen games with the Atlanta Braves, Vizcaíno had a 1–1 record, 4.67 ERA and 17 strikeouts in 17 1/3 innings. After the 2011 season, Baseball America rated Vizcaino as the Braves' second best prospect, after only Julio Teherán. On March 20, 2012, Vizcaino underwent Tommy John surgery causing him to miss the rest of the 2012 season.

=== Chicago Cubs (2012–14) ===
On July 30, 2012, Vizcaíno was traded along with right-handed pitcher Jaye Chapman to the Chicago Cubs for left-handed pitcher Paul Maholm and outfielder Reed Johnson. Vizcaíno started the 2013 season on the 60-day disabled list still recovering from the Tommy John surgery he previously had and was expected to return after the All-Star break. However, Vizcaíno required arthroscopic surgery on his elbow in May, and required the remainder of the 2013 season to rehabilitate. He returned in 2014 and was called up to the majors in September, when rosters expanded.

=== Second stint with Atlanta Braves (2014–19) ===
On November 16, 2014, the Cubs traded Vizcaíno and three international signing bonus slots to the Braves for Tommy La Stella and an international signing bonus slot. On March 30, 2015, Vizcaino was optioned to Gwinnett Braves of the International League. He was suspended for the first eighty games of the 2015 minor league season after testing positive for stanozolol in April.

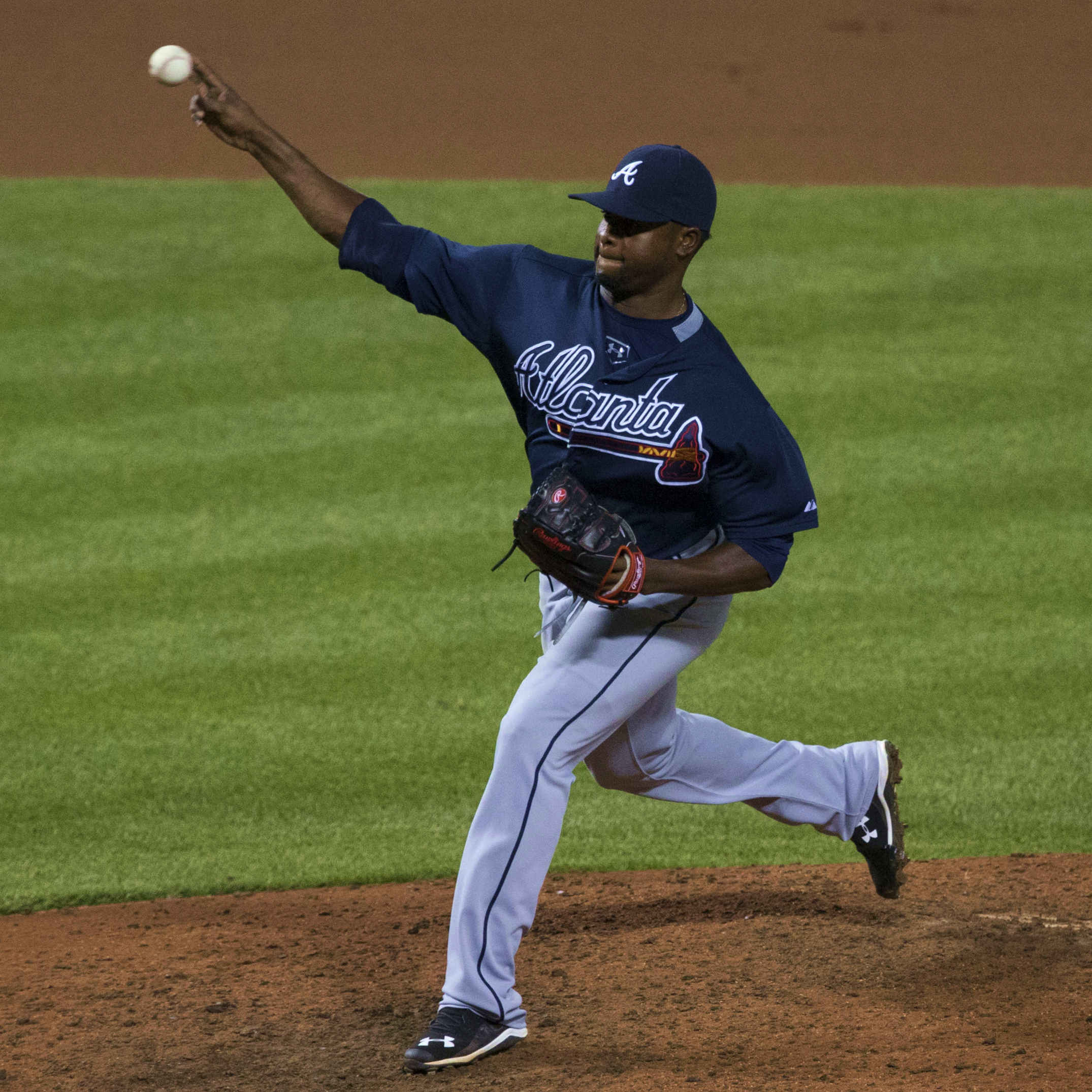
Vizcaíno with the Braves in 2015

Following the return from his suspension, Vizcaíno joined the struggling Braves bullpen. After the season-ending injury to Jason Grilli and the trade of Jim Johnson, Vizcaíno assumed the role of closing pitcher. On August 6, 2015, he recorded his first save against the Miami Marlins. He finished the season recording nine saves for the Braves.

Vizcaíno was eligible for arbitration for the first time following the 2015 season. He agreed to a one-year contract worth $897,500 on January 15, 2016, before hearings were slated to begin. Vizcaíno started the season well recording six saves and a 1.52 ERA through June 7. He then began to struggle, and was placed on the disabled list on July 15. Upon his return, Vizcaíno lost the closer role. He was placed on the DL for the second time that season on August 30. Vizcaíno made 43 appearances in 2016, throwing 38 1/3 innings while recording a 4.42 ERA and ten saves. For the 2017 season, he finished 62 games with 14 saves for the Braves in 57 1/3 innings. The next season, Vizcaíno signed a one-year deal for $1.55 million, avoiding arbitration for the second time.

In January 2018, Vizcaíno agreed to a contract worth $3.4 million. He reported soreness in his right shoulder in late June, and was placed on the 10-day disabled list. Vizcaíno returned to action as planned, only to be placed back on the disabled list in July. He was reactivated from the 60-day disabled list on September 14. On November 30, 2018, the Braves tendered Vizcaíno a contract worth $4.8 million. Three weeks into the 2019 season, Vizcaíno was placed on the 10-day injured list due to problems with his right shoulder. On April 17, 2019, Vizcaíno underwent surgery on his right labrum, and missed the rest of the season.

=== Seattle Mariners (2019) ===
On May 20, 2019, Vizcaíno and Jesse Biddle were traded to the Seattle Mariners in exchange for Anthony Swarzak. As he had undergone season-ending surgery prior to the trade, Vizcaíno did not pitch for the Mariners and elected free agency following the season.

=== New York Mets ===
On November 4, 2020, Vizcaino signed a minor league deal with the New York Mets. Vizcaíno spent the 2021 season with the Triple-A Syracuse Mets. He made 7 appearances, posting a 2.35 ERA and 14 strikeouts. He was released on November 11, 2021.

=== Kansas City Royals ===
On January 13, 2022, Vizcaíno signed a minor league contract with the Kansas City Royals. On May 30, Vizcaíno had his contract selected to the active roster. In 7 games for Kansas City, he struggled to a 6.35 ERA with 3 strikeouts across 5 2/3 innings pitched. On June 16, Vizcaíno was removed from the 40–man roster and sent outright to the Triple-A Omaha Storm Chasers. In 16 games for Omaha, he pitched to a 1.76 ERA with 19 strikeouts and 7 saves across 15 1/3 innings of work. Vizcaíno was released by the Royals organization on December 9.

=== Leones de Yucatán ===
On June 14, 2023, Vizcaíno signed with the Leones de Yucatán of the Mexican League. In 9 appearances for Yucatán, he did not concede a run, striking out 12 and recording 3 saves in 9 innings of work. Vizcaíno became a free agent following the season.

On June 16, 2024, Vizcaíno re–signed with Yucatán. In 5 games for Yucatán, he logged a 5.40 ERA with three strikeouts and one save across five innings of relief. Vizcaíno became a free agent following the season.

== Scouting profile ==
Vizcaíno's fastball has been recorded as fast as 101 miles per hour (163 km/h).
