= Charlie Culberson =

American baseball player (born 1989)

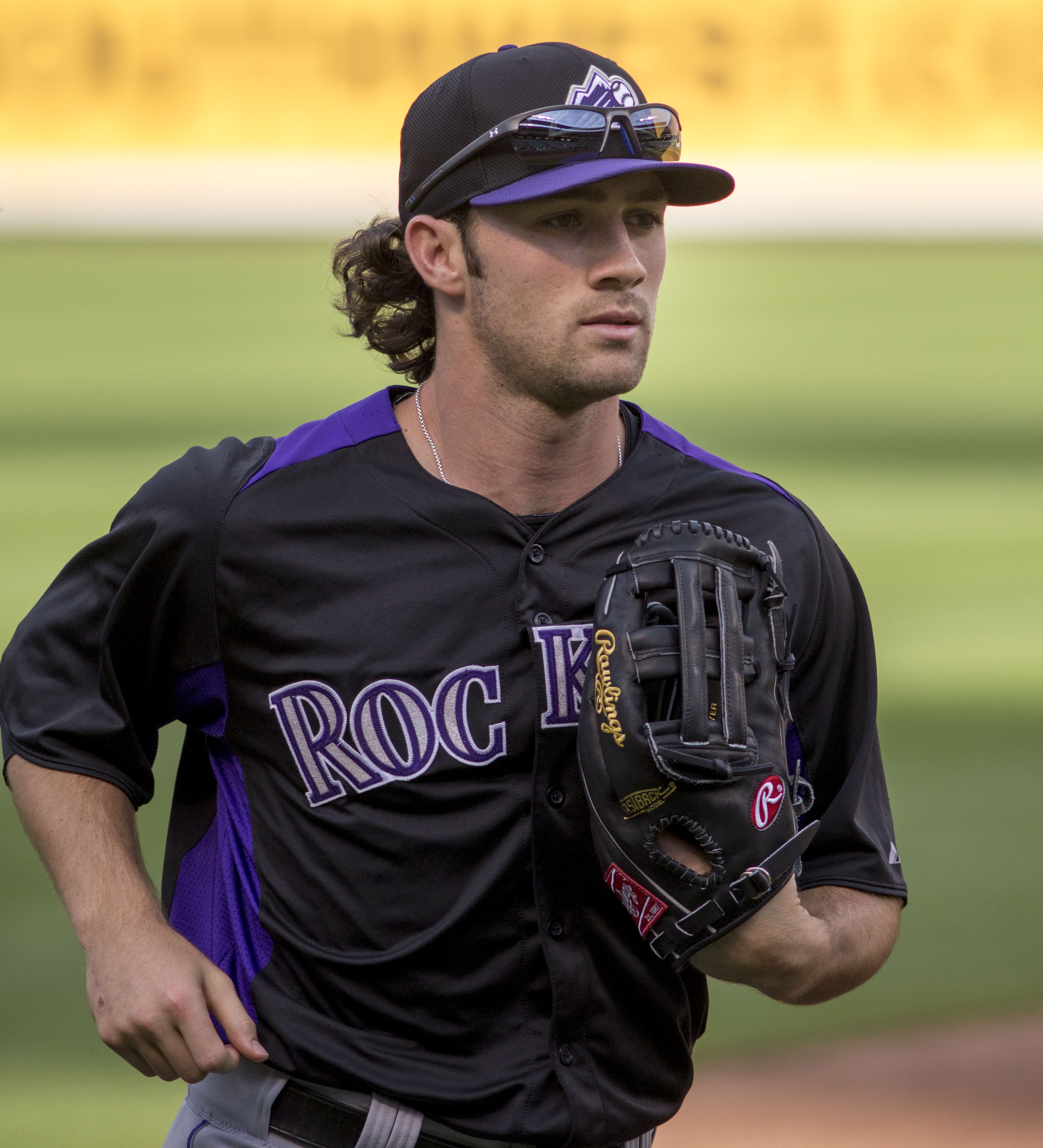
- Culberson with the Colorado Rockies in 2013

Savannah Bananas – No. 16
- Utility player
- Born: April 10, 1989 (age 37); Rome, Georgia, U.S.
- Batted: Right Threw: Right

MLB debut
- May 13, 2012, for the San Francisco Giants

Last MLB appearance
- July 16, 2023, for the Atlanta Braves

MLB statistics
- Batting average: .248
- Home runs: 30
- Runs batted in: 145
- Stats at Baseball Reference

Teams
- San Francisco Giants (2012); Colorado Rockies (2013–2014); Los Angeles Dodgers (2016–2017); Atlanta Braves (2018–2020); Texas Rangers (2021–2022); Atlanta Braves (2023)

Charles Edward Culberson (born April 10, 1989) is an American former professional baseball utility player. The San Francisco Giants drafted Culberson in the first round in the 2007 MLB draft. He played in Major League Baseball (MLB) for the Giants, Colorado Rockies, Los Angeles Dodgers, Atlanta Braves, and Texas Rangers.

== Early life ==
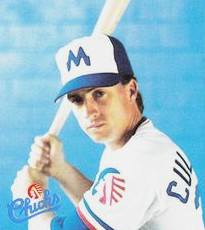
Culberson's father with the Memphis Chicks in 1988

Charles Edward Culberson was born on April 10, 1989, in Rome, Georgia, to parents Charles and Kim. He has an elder sister, Chelce. Culberson's father was the Giants 16th pick in the 1984 draft, and played in their minor league system for five seasons. While some baseball sites state that Leon Culberson, who played in the major leagues from 1943 to 1948, was Charlie Culberson's grandfather, Charlie Culberson has stated that "he was actually my grandfather’s first cousin".

Culberson grew up a Braves fan. He attended Calhoun High School in Calhoun, Georgia. In 2005, Culberson's high school baseball team won the state championship. On August 15, 2015, he was inducted into the Calhoun-Gordon County Sports Hall of Fame.

== Professional career ==
=== Draft and minor leagues ===
The San Francisco Giants drafted Culberson in the first round (51st overall) of the 2007 Major League Baseball draft out of high school. They added him to the 40 man roster to protect him from the Rule 5 draft after the 2011 season, in which he batted .259 with 10 home runs and 56 runs batted in for the Richmond Flying Squirrels of the Double-A Eastern League. He was rated the seventh best second base prospect prior to the 2012 season.

=== San Francisco Giants (2012) ===
After beginning the 2012 season with the Fresno Grizzlies of the Triple–A Pacific Coast League, the Giants promoted Culberson to the big league club on May 13, 2012. He made his MLB debut that day and collected his first major league base hit against Arizona Diamondbacks starter Joe Saunders.

=== Colorado Rockies (2013–2014) ===
On July 27, 2012, Culberson was traded to the Colorado Rockies for Marco Scutaro and cash considerations. He spent the rest of the 2012 season with the Colorado Springs Sky Sox, the Rockies' AAA affiliate, and continued to play for them in 2013. In 97 games for the Sky Sox, he hit .310/.338/.524 with 14 home runs, 64 RBI and 8 triples.

On July 29, Culberson was recalled by the Rockies, replacing Jordan Pacheco. When Carlos González went on the disabled list, Culberson and Corey Dickerson entered a platoon situation in left field. On August 16, 2013, Culberson hit his first MLB home run off Wei-Yin Chen of the Baltimore Orioles. In 47 games with the Rockies, he hit .293/.317/.404 with 2 home runs, 12 RBI and 5 stolen bases.

On May 4, 2014, Culberson hit a pinch-hit walk-off two-run home run off New York Mets closer Kyle Farnsworth, giving the Rockies an 11–10 victory.

During spring training in 2015, Culberson was injured. Nearer to opening day, he was diagnosed with a herniated disc in his back, and played in only five games at the major league level. After the season, he was granted free agency by the Rockies and signed a minor league contract with the Los Angeles Dodgers.

=== Los Angeles Dodgers (2016–2017) ===
Culberson was signed by the Dodgers in November 2015 and invited to spring training, where he impressed new Dodgers manager Dave Roberts. After an injury to Howie Kendrick opened a spot for him, Culberson made the Dodgers 2016 Opening Day roster. He was designated for assignment in July and optioned to the Oklahoma City Dodgers, then recalled a month later. Culberson ended the big club's final home game of the season with a walk-off home run against former Rockies teammate Boone Logan, clinching the Dodgers' fourth consecutive National League West division title. It was also the last Dodgers home game called by longtime broadcaster Vin Scully. He played in 34 games for Los Angeles, hitting .284 and in 70 games for Oklahoma City, hitting .260. He had no hits in seven at-bats with two strikeouts in the 2016 National League Division Series. He was outrighted to the minors and removed from the 40-man roster on December 9, 2016. He was assigned to Oklahoma City to begin the season. He remained in the minors for the conclusion of the AAA season, hitting .250 in 108 games and returned to the majors with the Dodgers on September 4. In 15 games for the Dodgers, he hit .154 with two hits in 13 at-bats. When starting shortstop Corey Seager was left off of the 2017 NLCS roster because of a back injury, Culberson was added to the postseason roster. He appeared in all five games of the series, with five hits in 11 at-bats for a .455 average. In the 2017 World Series, Culberson had three hits in five at-bats, including his first career post-season home run, which he hit off Chris Devenski of the Houston Astros in the 11th inning of Game Two.

=== Atlanta Braves (2018–2020) ===
On December 16, 2017, the Dodgers traded Culberson, Adrián González, Scott Kazmir, Brandon McCarthy, and cash considerations to the Atlanta Braves for Matt Kemp. Culberson struggled to begin the 2018 season, earning a larger role in late May due to an injury to Ronald Acuña Jr. On May 28, Culberson hit a walk-off home run against the New York Mets as a pinch hitter. He repeated this feat on June 3 against the Washington Nationals. Culberson pitched professionally for the first time on August 17, taking the mound in the ninth inning of a game against the Colorado Rockies. His success during the 2018 season earned him the nickname "Charlie Clutch."

Culberson and the Braves agreed to a one-year contract worth $1.395 million for the 2019 season. He changed uniform numbers from 16 to 8 to accommodate the return of Brian McCann to the organization as a free agent. On September 14, Culberson was struck by a pitched ball thrown by Fernando Rodney of the Washington Nationals, and left the game. Culberson suffered several facial fractures. In 2019, he batted .259/.294/.437 with five home runs and 20 RBIs.

Culberson was non-tendered and became a free agent on December 2, 2019. He returned to the Braves by signing a minor league contract on December 13. On July 21, 2020, Culberson had his contract selected to the 40-man roster. On September 8, Culberson was designated for assignment by the Braves.

In 2020, he batted one-for-seven with an RBI.

On September 30, 2020, Culberson was selected back to the 40-man roster to be active for the Wild Card Series matchup against the Cincinnati Reds.

=== Texas Rangers (2021–2022) ===
On December 28, 2020, Culberson signed a minor league deal with the Texas Rangers and was invited to spring training. On March 29, 2021, Culberson was selected to the 40-man roster. Over 90 games in 2021, Culberson hit .243/.296/.381/.676 with 5 home runs, 22 RBI, with 7 stolen bases. On March 17, 2022, Culberson signed a minor league contract with Texas. On April 5, 2022, Culberson had his contract selected to the major league roster. Getting into 68 games for Texas in 2022, Culberson hit .252/.283/.357/.640 with 2 home runs and 12 RBI that season.

=== Tampa Bay Rays ===
On February 9, 2023, Culberson signed a minor league contract with the Tampa Bay Rays organization. Culberson went 4-for-24 in spring training before he was released by the Rays on March 24.

=== Second stint with Atlanta Braves (2023) ===
On March 31, 2023, Culberson signed a minor league contract to return to the Atlanta Braves organization and was assigned to the Triple-A Gwinnett Stripers. He played in 24 games for Gwinnett, batting .204/.234/.255 with 1 home run, 10 RBI, and 3 stolen bases. On May 19, Culberson's contract was selected to the active roster. He was designated for assignment by the Braves on June 18, without having appeared in a game for the club. On June 25, he cleared waivers and elected free agency in lieu of an outright assignment.

On June 27, Culberson re–signed with the Braves on a minor league contract. He was selected back to the major league roster on June 30. His only appearance came as a pinch hitter in the team's July 16 game against the Chicago White Sox, and he collected a single off of Jesse Scholtens in his only at–bat. Following Atlanta's acquisition of Nicky Lopez, Culberson was designated for assignment by the Braves on July 31. He cleared waivers and was sent outright to Triple–A Gwinnett on August 2. The next day, Culberson declined the assignment and elected free agency. He re–signed with the Braves on a new minor league contract on August 4 and elected free agency on November 6 when the season concluded.

On January 12, 2024, Culberson re-signed with the Braves on a minor league contract, with the intention of converting to a pitcher. He made his first spring training appearance as a pitcher on February 29, pitching one inning and giving up a single and no runs. On March 23, Culberson was released by the Braves organization.

On September 19, 2024, Culberson announced his retirement from professional baseball.

=== Savannah Bananas (2025–present) ===
On March 30, 2025, Culbertson made his return to professional baseball, debuting with the Savannah Bananas.

== Personal life ==
Culberson married Sarah O'Rourke in November 2011. The couple have three children.
