= Shane Carle =

American baseball player (born 1991)

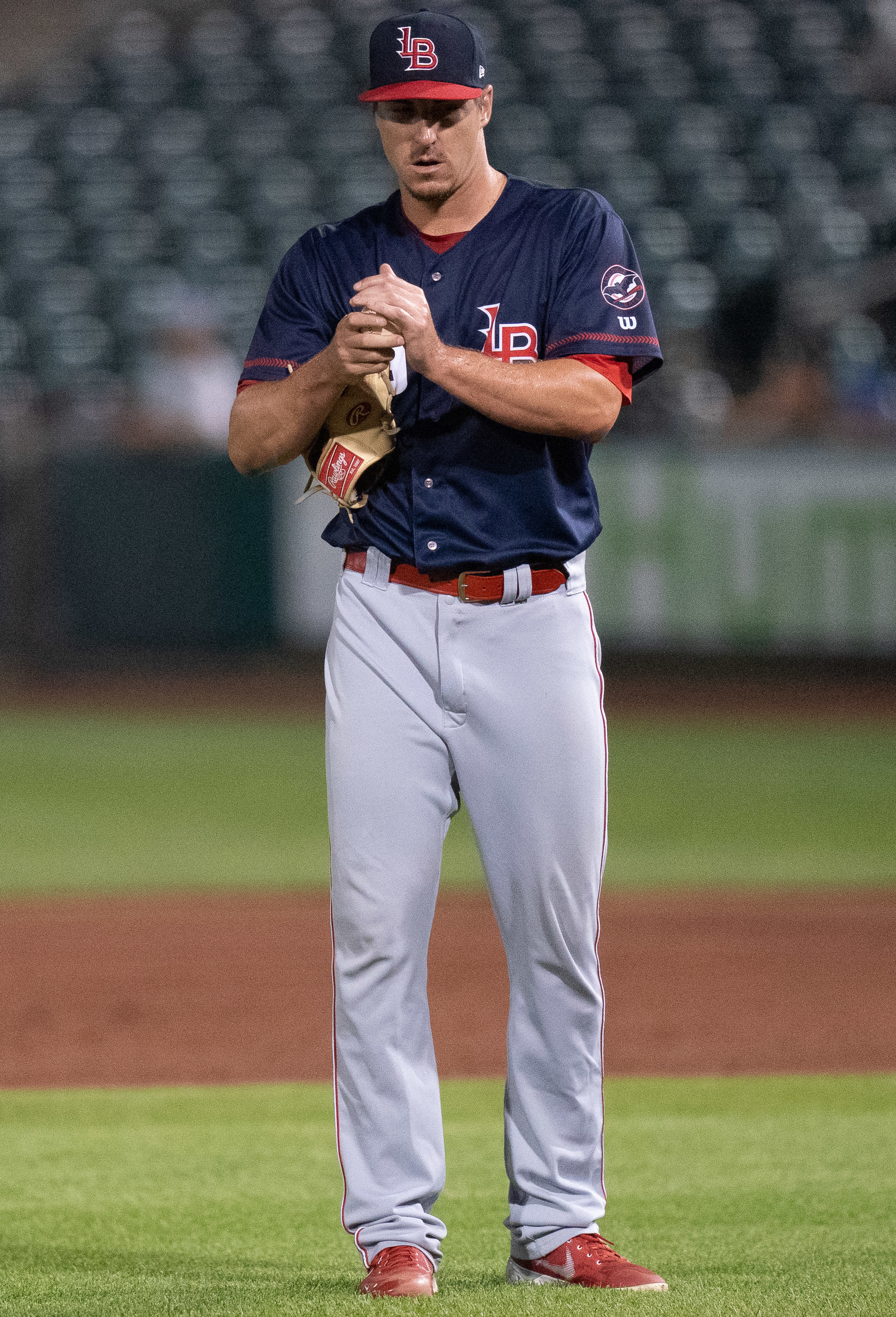
- Carle with the Louisville Bats in 2021
- Pitcher
- Born: August 30, 1991 (age 35); Santa Cruz, California, U.S.
- Batted: Right Threw: Right

MLB debut
- April 14, 2017, for the Colorado Rockies

Last MLB appearance
- May 2, 2019, for the Atlanta Braves

MLB statistics
- Win–loss record: 4–1
- Earned run average: 3.89
- Strikeouts: 53
- Stats at Baseball Reference

Teams
- Colorado Rockies (2017); Atlanta Braves (2018–2019)

Shane Taylor Carle (born August 30, 1991) is an American former professional baseball pitcher. He has played in Major League Baseball (MLB) for the Colorado Rockies and Atlanta Braves.

== Career ==
=== Pittsburgh Pirates ===
Carle attended Scotts Valley High School in Scotts Valley, California and played college baseball at Cabrillo College and California State University, Long Beach. He was drafted by the Pittsburgh Pirates in the tenth round of the 2013 Major League Baseball draft. He signed and made his professional debut with the Jamestown Jammers and spent the whole season there, going 1–0 with a 2.15 ERA in 50 1/3 innings. In 2014, he played for the West Virginia Power and Bradenton Marauders where he compiled a 4–8 record and 3.67 ERA in 27 games (23 starts).

=== Colorado Rockies ===
On November 11, 2014, Carle was traded to the Colorado Rockies for Rob Scahill. He spent the 2015 season with the New Britain Rock Cats where he was 14–7 with a 3.48 ERA in 26 starts. He also pitched in one game for the Albuquerque Isotopes at the beginning of the season. In 2016, he pitched for Albuquerque where he pitched to a 5–8 record and 5.42 ERA in 27 games (19 starts). The Rockies added him to their 40-man roster after the 2016 season.

Carle began 2017 with the Isotopes and debuted at the major league level on April 14, 2017. He was sent back down three days later and recalled twice more on August 5 and September 5. In 36 games for the Isotopes he was 3–5 with a 5.37 ERA, and in four innings pitched for the Rockies, he compiled a 6.75 ERA.

=== Pittsburgh Pirates (second stint) ===
On January 4, 2018, Carle was claimed off waivers by the Pittsburgh Pirates. He was designated for assignment on January 14, 2018.

=== Atlanta Braves ===
On January 16, 2018, the Pirates traded Carle to the Atlanta Braves for a player to be named later or cash considerations. Carle made the Opening Day roster, and began the season in Atlanta's bullpen. He claimed his first major league victory on April 3, 2018, pitching 3 1/3 innings in relief of Julio Teherán. Carle made the Braves' Opening Day roster for a second time in 2019. While pitching against the Philadelphia Phillies on March 30, 2019, Carle hit Rhys Hoskins with a pitch, after the previous batter, Bryce Harper, had hit a home run. Home plate umpire Rob Drake promptly ejected Carle from the game. On July 24, 2019, Carle was designated for assignment.

=== Texas Rangers ===
On July 25, 2019, Carle was traded to the Texas Rangers in exchange for cash considerations. On August 23, Carle was designated for assignment. He was outrighted to the Triple-A Nashville Sounds, where he finished the year. Carle did not play in a game in 2020 due to the cancellation of the minor league season because of the COVID-19 pandemic. Carle was released by the Rangers organization on June 1, 2020.

=== Cincinnati Reds ===
On February 11, 2021, Carle signed a minor league contract with the Cincinnati Reds organization that included an invitation to Spring Training. He was assigned to the Triple-A Louisville Bats to begin the season. After posting a 3.45 ERA in 19 appearances, Carle exercised his contract option for free agency and was released on July 1.

=== Seattle Mariners ===
On July 3, 2021, Carle signed a minor league contract with the Seattle Mariners organization and was assigned to the Triple-A Tacoma Rainiers. He logged 2 scoreless innings in as many appearances with Tacoma before being released by the Mariners on July 14.

=== Arizona Diamondbacks ===
On July 18, 2021, Carle signed a minor league contract with the Arizona Diamondbacks organization. In six games for the Triple-A Reno Aces, Carle struggled to a 10.80 ERA with four strikeouts. On August 9, Carle was released by the Diamondbacks.
