= 2019 Washington Nationals season =

Major League Baseball season

2019 Washington Nationals
- World Series champions National League champions National League Wild Card winners
- League: National League
- Division: East
- Ballpark: Nationals Park
- City: Washington, D.C.
- Record: 93–69 (.574)
- Divisional place: 2nd
- Owners: Mark Lerner
- General managers: Mike Rizzo
- Managers: Dave Martinez
- Television: MASN (Bob Carpenter, FP Santangelo, Alex Chappell, Dan Kolko, Bo Porter)
- Radio: 106.7 The Fan; Washington Nationals Radio Network (Charlie Slowes, Dave Jageler)

The 2019 Washington Nationals season was the Nationals' 15th season competing as the Major League Baseball (MLB) franchise representative in the District of Columbia, the 12th season at Nationals Park, and the 51st since the original team was started in Montreal, Quebec, Canada. The team clinched a playoff berth for the third time in four seasons on September 24. The Nationals won their first ever National League pennant on October 15, and eventually won their first World Series in franchise history on October 30, becoming the seventh Wild Card team to win the World Series. The Nationals also set franchise records in home runs (231) and runs scored (873).

They opened the regular season at home against the New York Mets on March 28 and closed it at home against the Cleveland Indians on September 29. They beat the Milwaukee Brewers in the NLWC Game on October 1, winning their first playoff round since 1981, and first since moving to Washington D.C.. In the NLDS, they upset the Los Angeles Dodgers - two-time defending National League champions and winner of 106 games - in five games, to advance to the NLCS for the first time since 1981. They swept the St. Louis Cardinals, winning the pennant and advancing to the World Series for the first time in Nationals franchise history. This ended the longest drought (50 seasons) for a team to win their first league pennant in MLB history. This was also Washington, D.C.'s first appearance in the World Series since the American League's Senators in 1933. They defeated the Houston Astros (107–55) in seven games to capture the franchise's first World Series championship, and the first for Washington, D.C. since 1924.

The Nationals also became just the second team to sweep their opponent in a best-of-seven game LCS and then win the World Series, the other team being the 1995 Atlanta Braves. In their World Series win they also became the first team in the history of North American professional sports to win each road game in a best-of-seven playoff series.

The Nationals' 2019 season is widely regarded as one of the most remarkable turnarounds in modern baseball history. After starting the season 19–31, the team rebounded to finish 93–69 and ultimately win the World Series. At one point in late May, their championship odds were estimated at just 1.5 percent before they posted a 74–38 record over the remainder of the season. Their postseason run further underscored the improbability of their success, as they won five elimination games—trailing in all of them—and became the first team in Major League Baseball history to do so. In the years since, the team has frequently been cited as a benchmark example of resilience following a poor start.

As of 2026, this represents the most recent winning season and playoff berth for the Nationals.

== Offseason ==
=== Team news ===
With the Nationals coming off a disappointing 82–80 2018 season, general manager and president of baseball operations Mike Rizzo nonetheless declared confidence in manager Dave Martinez and his coaching staff, all under contract for the 2019 season.

The Nationals' player development contract with the Triple-A Syracuse Chiefs expired following the 2018 minor league season. Instead, the Nationals signed a two-year player development contract with the Fresno Grizzlies of the Pacific Coast League, although Rizzo publicly acknowledged Fresno was team officials' "second choice" behind the Nashville Sounds, who signed a four-year deal with the Texas Rangers instead.

Set to become a free agent after the 2018 season, Bryce Harper indicated in numerous interviews and speaking appearances that he was interested in reaching a new deal with the Nationals, despite considerable media speculation that Washington would be unwilling to meet Harper's likely asking price for a contract. The Nationals made Harper what principal managing owner Mark Lerner later described as "one heck of an offer" in an attempt to extend him toward the end of the 2018 season, reported to be roughly $300 million over ten years, which would have been a record-setting amount for a free agent in American sports, but Harper elected free agency and Lerner said in December he expected him to sign for a higher bid elsewhere. Harper ultimately signed with the division-rival Philadelphia Phillies for a reported $330 million over 13 years, the largest free agent contract in the history of North American sports, after a pursuit that stretched into March. Along with Harper, starting pitcher Jeremy Hellickson, catcher Matt Wieters, infielder Mark Reynolds, and relievers Joaquín Benoit, Tim Collins, Kelvin Herrera, and Greg Holland became free agents after the 2018 season. Catcher Jhonatan Solano elected free agency as well after being outrighted from the roster. Hellickson signed a new one-year major league contract to stay in Washington for the 2019 season.

The Nationals negotiated a deal with free agent reliever Trevor Rosenthal, which was officially announced November 3. On November 20, the Nationals announced a reunion with their former catcher Kurt Suzuki, who last suited up for Washington in the 2013 season. Left-handed-hitting first baseman Matt Adams, who had played for Washington during the 2018 season before being claimed off waivers in August by the St. Louis Cardinals, also reunited with the Nationals on a one-year deal with a mutual option for the 2020 season. The Nationals' stated top pitching target, left-handed starter Patrick Corbin, was introduced December 7 in a press conference as Washington inked him to a six-year deal. Washington added another free agent to its starting rotation on December 27, when the team announced the signing of right-hander Aníbal Sánchez. Shoring up another positional weakness, the Nationals officially signed veteran second baseman Brian Dozier to a one-year deal on January 13. Days after releasing former top pitching prospect Sammy Solís in March, the Nationals signed another veteran left-handed reliever, Tony Sipp, to a one-year major league contract with a 2020 mutual option.

The Nationals swung a rare October trade with the division-rival Miami Marlins, acquiring former closer Kyle Barraclough for international bonus money on October 10. Ten days after signing Suzuki, the Nationals made another trade to bolster their catching corps, sending pitcher Jefry Rodríguez, a minor league outfielder, and a player to be named later to the Cleveland Indians for veteran Yan Gomes. Less than a week after signing Corbin, the Nationals dealt from their starting rotation as they sent veteran right-hander Tanner Roark to the Cincinnati Reds for Tanner Rainey, a rookie reliever. The team traded right-handed reliever Trevor Gott off waivers to the San Francisco Giants for cash considerations in February, on the eve of the start of spring training. Catcher Pedro Severino, out of minor league options and blocked from the major league roster by Suzuki and Gomes, was placed on waivers toward the end of March and claimed by the Baltimore Orioles on March 23.

The Nationals tendered contracts to all of their arbitration-eligible players—Barraclough, Roark, Solís, Anthony Rendon, Joe Ross, Michael A. Taylor, and Trea Turner—but traded Roark before the terms of his 2019 contract were agreed upon and released Solís during spring training, on the last day the team would owe him only one-sixth of his 2019 salary. Barraclough and Taylor did not settle with the team on contract terms, sending Washington to salary arbitration for the first time since the 2014–15 offseason. The arbitration panel sided with the team against both players.

=== Transactions ===
- October 10, 2018: The Nationals acquired right-handed relief pitcher Kyle Barraclough from the Miami Marlins for international slot money.
- November 3, 2018: The Nationals signed right-handed relief pitcher Trevor Rosenthal to a one-year major league deal.
- November 16, 2018: The Nationals signed right-handed pitcher Henderson Álvarez to a minor league deal with an invitation to spring training.
- November 20, 2018: The Nationals signed catcher Kurt Suzuki to a two-year major league deal.
- November 30, 2018: The Nationals acquired catcher Yan Gomes from the Cleveland Indians for right-handed pitcher Jefry Rodríguez, minor league outfielder Daniel Johnson, and minor league infielder Andruw Monasterio.
- December 7, 2018: The Nationals signed left-handed starting pitcher Patrick Corbin to a six-year major league deal.
- December 12, 2018: The Nationals acquired right-handed relief pitcher Tanner Rainey from the Cincinnati Reds for right-handed starting pitcher Tanner Roark.
- December 18, 2018: The Nationals signed first baseman Matt Adams to a one-year major league deal.
- December 27, 2018: The Nationals signed right-handed starting pitcher Aníbal Sánchez to a two-year major league deal.
- January 13, 2019: The Nationals signed second baseman Brian Dozier to a one-year major league deal and designated infielder/outfielder Matt Reynolds for assignment.
- February 8, 2019: The Nationals signed right-handed starting pitcher Jeremy Hellickson to a one-year major league contract and designated right-handed relief pitcher Trevor Gott for assignment.
- February 12, 2019: The Nationals signed left-handed pitcher Vidal Nuño, right-handed pitchers Aaron Barrett, Scott Copeland, and J. J. Hoover, infielder Brandon Snyder, and outfielder Hunter Jones to minor league contracts with invitations to spring training.
- February 13, 2019: The Nationals sold right-handed relief pitcher Trevor Gott to the San Francisco Giants.
- March 9, 2019: The Nationals unconditionally released left-handed relief pitcher Sammy Solís.
- March 13, 2019: The Nationals signed left-handed relief pitcher Tony Sipp to a one-year major-league deal.
- March 23, 2019: The Nationals lost catcher Pedro Severino to the Baltimore Orioles on a waiver claim.
- March 27, 2019: The Nationals selected the contract of infielder Jake Noll.

=== Spring training ===
The Nationals held spring training at their facility at FITTEAM Ballpark of the Palm Beaches in West Palm Beach, Florida, which they shared with the Houston Astros. It was their third year at the facility.

The day before opening camp, the Nationals announced a slate of non-roster invitees to major league spring training including top infield prospects Carter Kieboom and Luis García Jr., as well as left-handed pitcher Vidal Nuño; right-handed pitchers Henderson Álvarez, Aaron Barrett, Wil Crowe, J. J. Hoover, and Ronald Peña; catchers Tres Barrera and Taylor Gushue; infielders Jose Marmolejos, Jake Noll, Matt Reynolds, and Brandon Snyder; and outfielders Hunter Jones and Chuck Taylor.

Veteran utilityman Howie Kendrick had recovered enough from a ruptured Achilles tendon he suffered in May 2018 to participate in spring training workouts and games from the beginning. However, Kendrick suffered another leg injury, a strained hamstring, while running the bases in an early March game, taking him out of commission for at least a few weeks. Outfielder Michael A. Taylor, competing for the role of starting center fielder, sprained his left knee and hip after catching a cleat in a March game. Also hampered by injuries were right-handed relievers Justin Miller, who strained his lower back and missed just over a week before returning to action in mid-March, and Koda Glover, who was lifted from his first spring game in late February with a forearm strain and was shut down from throwing.

The Nationals broke camp at West Palm Beach on March 24 to head north for the year. On March 25, they defeated the New York Yankees 5–3 in an exhibition game at Nationals Park. Including that game, the Nationals completed spring training with a Grapefruit League record of 17–12–2, third-best in the Grapefruit League and better than any Cactus League team's record.

On March 27, the Nationals, following Jake Noll's strong spring performance in which he hit .320 and batted in 10 runs, purchased his contract from the Double-A Harrisburg Senators. The Nationals placed him on the 25-man roster for Opening Day.

== Regular season ==
=== Opening Day ===
==== Opening Day lineup ====
Opening Day Starters
Name	Position
Adam Eaton	Right field
Trea Turner	Shortstop
Anthony Rendon	Third base
Juan Soto	Left field
Ryan Zimmerman	First base
Yan Gomes	Catcher
Brian Dozier	Second base
Max Scherzer	Pitcher
Víctor Robles	Center field

==== Game recap ====
Opening Day on March 28 – the earliest opening day in MLB history excluding international openers – saw a pitchers′ duel before a sell-out crowd at Nationals Park between the starters who had won the last three Cy Young Awards: the New York Mets′ Jacob deGrom, who won it in 2018, and Washington's Max Scherzer, who won it in 2013 as well as 2016 and 2017 and was the runner-up for it in 2018. DeGrom threw 93 pitches over six scoreless innings, 59 of them for strikes, scattering a double, four singles, and a walk, while striking out 10. The Nationals threatened only twice against him. In the bottom of the third inning with New York leading 1–0, center fielder Víctor Robles led off with a double – the Nationals′ only extra-base hit of the game – and advanced to third with no outs when right fielder Adam Eaton singled, but after shortstop Trea Turner struck out, Robles was too far off third when third baseman Anthony Rendon hit a chopper to third. The Mets forced Eaton out at second and Robles was caught in a rundown between third and home, resulting in an inning-ending double play. In the bottom of the sixth, shortstop Trea Turner led off with a single, stole second, and then stole third with one out – giving him three stolen bases for the game, making him only the seventh player in MLB history to steal three bases on Opening Day and the first to do so since 2009 (Note: The last MLB player before Trea Turner to steal three bases on Opening Day was Emilio Bonifacio, who did it for the Florida Marlins in 2009. (See "Nationals Roundup: Turner first player to steal three bases on Opening Day since 2009". NBC Sports Washington. March 29, 2019. Archived from the original on March 29, 2019.)) – but left fielder Juan Soto struck out and first baseman Ryan Zimmerman popped out, stranding Turner at third. The Nats never threatened again against either deGrom or the Mets′ bullpen; Mets reliever Seth Lugo struck out the side in the top of the seventh and Jeurys Familia and Edwin Díaz pitched scoreless innings in the eighth and ninth as Mets pitchers combined to strike out 14 Nats.

Scherzer, meanwhile, gave up a solo homer in the top of the first inning to the third batter he faced, Mets second baseman Robinson Canó, but left the game with the score still 1–0 after throwing 109 pitches, 76 of them for strikes, over 7 2/3 innings and striking out 12 Mets, giving up only one more hit and two walks. However, Mets pinch-hitter Dominic Smith, who Scherzer had walked in the top of the eighth inning before leaving the game, advanced to second on a single reliever Justin Miller gave up to Mets first baseman Pete Alonso, and then reliever Matt Grace surrendered a single to Canó, which drove in Smith and resulted in a second run charged to Scherzer and New York adding to its lead. Nats pitchers gave up only five hits, all singles except for Canó's homer, but the Nats also managed only five hits, four of them singles, and the Mets shut them out 2–0.

It was only the second Opening Day game in MLB history in which both starting pitchers had ten or more strikeouts. (Note: The only other Opening Day game in MLB history in which both starting pitchers had ten or more strikeouts took place on April 7, 1970, when Dave McNally of the Baltimore Orioles had 13 strikeouts in a complete-game win and Sam McDowell of the Detroit Tigers struck out 11 in 6 1/3 innings. (See Adler, David, "Scherzer, deGrom make Opening Day history," mlb.com, March 28, 2019.)) Scherzer became the 16th pitcher in MLB history to strike out 12 or more batters on Opening Day, and it was the 83rd game of his career with 10 or more strikeouts.

=== Season standings ===
==== National League East ====
NL East
Team	W	L	Pct.	GB	Home	Road
Atlanta Braves	97	65	.599	—	50‍–‍31	47‍–‍34
Washington Nationals	93	69	.574	4	50‍–‍31	43‍–‍38
New York Mets	86	76	.531	11	48‍–‍33	38‍–‍43
Philadelphia Phillies	81	81	.500	16	45‍–‍36	36‍–‍45
Miami Marlins	57	105	.352	40	30‍–‍51	27‍–‍54

==== National League Wild Card ====
Division leaders
Team	W	L	Pct.
Los Angeles Dodgers	106	56	.654
Atlanta Braves	97	65	.599
St. Louis Cardinals	91	71	.562

Wild Card teams (Top 2 teams qualify for postseason)
Team	W	L	Pct.	GB
Washington Nationals	93	69	.574	+4
Milwaukee Brewers	89	73	.549	—
New York Mets	86	76	.531	3
Arizona Diamondbacks	85	77	.525	4
Chicago Cubs	84	78	.519	5
Philadelphia Phillies	81	81	.500	8
San Francisco Giants	77	85	.475	12
Cincinnati Reds	75	87	.463	14
Colorado Rockies	71	91	.438	18
San Diego Padres	70	92	.432	19
Pittsburgh Pirates	69	93	.426	20
Miami Marlins	57	105	.352	32

=== Record vs. opponents ===
2019 National League record Source: MLB Standings Grid – 2019
Team	AZ	ATL	CHC	CIN	COL	LAD	MIA	MIL	NYM	PHI	PIT	SD	SF	STL	WSH	AL
Arizona	—	4–3	2–4	3–3	9–10	8–11	3–4	2–5	2–5	4–2	6–1	11–8	10–9	3–3	4–3	14–6
Atlanta	3–4	—	5–2	3–4	3–3	2–4	15–4	3–3	11–8	9–10	5–2	5–2	5–2	4–2	11–8	13–7
Chicago	4–2	2–5	—	8–11	3–3	3–4	6–1	9–10	5–2	2–5	11–8	4–3	4–2	9–10	2–4	12–8
Cincinnati	3–3	4–3	11–8	—	3–3	1–5	6–1	8–11	3–4	3–4	7–12	5–2	4–3	7–12	1–5	9–11
Colorado	10–9	3–3	3–3	3–3	—	4–15	5–2	5–2	2–4	3–4	2–5	11–8	7–12	2–5	3–4	8–12
Los Angeles	11–8	4–2	4–3	5–1	15–4	—	5–1	4–3	5–2	5–2	6–0	13–6	12–7	3–4	4–3	10–10
Miami	4–3	4–15	1–6	1–6	2–5	1–5	—	2–5	6–13	10–9	3–3	4–2	3–3	3–4	4–15	9–11
Milwaukee	5–2	3–3	10–9	11–8	2–5	3–4	5–2	—	5–1	4–3	15–4	3–4	2–4	9–10	4–2	8–12
New York	5–2	8–11	2–5	4–3	4–2	2–5	13–6	1–5	—	7–12	5–1	3–3	3–4	2–5	12–7	15–5
Philadelphia	2–4	10–9	5–2	4–3	4–3	2–5	9–10	3–4	12–7	—	4–2	3–3	3–4	4–2	5–14	11–9
Pittsburgh	1–6	2–5	8–11	12–7	5–2	0–6	3–3	4–15	1–5	2–4	—	6–1	5–2	5–14	3–4	12–8
San Diego	8–11	2–5	3–4	2–5	8–11	6–13	2–4	4–3	3–3	3–3	1–6	—	9–10	4–2	4–3	11–9
San Francisco	9–10	2–5	2–4	3–4	12–7	7–12	3–3	4–2	4–3	4–3	2–5	10–9	—	3–4	1–5	11–9
St. Louis	3–3	2–4	10–9	12–7	5–2	4–3	4–3	10–9	5–2	2–4	14–5	2–4	4–3	—	5–2	9–11
Washington	3–4	8–11	4–2	5–1	4–3	3–4	15–4	2–4	7–12	14–5	4–3	3–4	5–1	2–5	—	14–6

=== March–April ===
The Nationals lost their first two games to the division-rival New York Mets. A quality start by Patrick Corbin, who left the Nationals with the lead, was squandered in the third game on March 31 by ineffectual Washington relief pitching, including a blown save by closer Sean Doolittle in his first opportunity of the season. The Nationals rallied against Mets reliever Justin Wilson to win 6–5 as shortstop Trea Turner socked a walk-off home run to left field, his second homer of the game.

On April 2, Philadelphia Phillies starter Zach Eflin broke Turner's index finger with a fastball as he squared to bunt, sending him to the injured list. In former Nationals outfielder Bryce Harper's return to Nationals Park with the rival Phillies, Max Scherzer struck Harper out twice, but Harper hit safely in each of his last three at-bats, capped by a two-run home run off Jeremy Hellickson with the Phillies already leading 6–2, giving the game its final 8–2 score. The Nationals salvaged the two-game series by winning April 3 on a bases-loaded, ninth-inning walk issued by Phillies reliever David Robertson to rookie pinch-hitter Jake Noll. Noll's first career RBI finished off a seesaw contest in which the Phillies scored twice off Nationals starter Aníbal Sánchez in the first inning; the Nationals responded by reeling off six unanswered runs against Phillies ace Aaron Nola; after Sánchez exited with a bruise on his hip from a line-drive comebacker, the Phillies scored six unanswered runs of their own off Nationals relievers; (Note: Two of those runs were charged to reliever Trevor Rosenthal, who became the first major league pitcher on record to make four straight appearances without recording an out and allowing at least one run. (See Zielonka, Adam, "Trevor Rosenthal maintains ERA of infinity after third appearance", The Washington Times, April 3, 2019)) and after Phillies manager Gabe Kapler inserted his closer Seranthony Domínguez in the ninth inning, the Nationals scored one run on a double by catcher Yan Gomes and then tied the game as Phillies first baseman Rhys Hoskins couldn't haul in a relay throw to retire a hustling Adam Eaton.

Having already recalled infielder Adrián Sánchez from the Triple-A Fresno Grizzlies to replace Turner on the roster, the Nationals optioned Noll after the April 3 game to make room for the activation of veteran utilityman Howie Kendrick from the injured list. General manager Mike Rizzo publicly rejected the idea of calling up top shortstop prospect Carter Kieboom to play in Turner's place. "We're going to see him sooner rather than later," Rizzo told reporters, adding, "When we feel he's ready, we'll bring him." Adrián Sánchez did not appear in a game before being optioned to the Double-A Harrisburg Senators to clear an extra spot in the Nationals' foundering bullpen on April 7. The Nationals recalled right-hander Joe Ross and announced that Ross, a starting pitcher for most of his career, would be used as a reliever for the first time since September 2015.

The Nationals enjoyed a winning roadtrip through two series in New York and Philadelphia, taking two out of three from both the Mets and the Phillies. The bullpen remained a glaring issue for the Nationals against the Mets. Scherzer departed with a 12–2 lead in the rubber game on April 7, but reliever Matt Grace allowed both inherited runners to score and gave up two more runs of his own, Wander Suero pitched a scoreless eighth inning, (Note: Trevor Rosenthal could not retire either of the two batters he faced before being pulled from the game, but Suero stranded both inherited runners to give Rosenthal his first appearance of the year without a run charged to him. Rosenthal tied a major league record previously set by Joey Eischen of the Nationals in 2005 and matched by Trever Miller of the St. Louis Cardinals in 2011 with five straight appearances without retiring a batter, dating back to the 2017 season. (See Baer, Jack, "Trevor Rosenthal's run of infinite ERA hits record territory", sports.yahoo.com, April 7, 2019)) then Ross allowed a three-run home run in the ninth inning before Doolittle was summoned to finish out the 12–9 win. But in Philadelphia, Nationals relief pitching held strong, allowing just two runs in the series: the deciding run in a 4–3 loss on April 8, and the lone Phillies run in a 15–1 blowout on April 10. (Note: Staked to a 15-run lead in the ninth inning, Trevor Rosenthal walked his first batter, becoming the first pitcher since David Lundquist for the San Diego Padres in the 2002 season to allow the first ten batters he faced in a season to reach by walking, hitting safely, or being hit by a pitch. Rosenthal walked two more in the inning and allowed an earned run, but he finished the game to snap his streak of consecutive game appearances without an out at five. His earned run average stood at 72.00 after the outing. (See "Rosenthal retires 1st batter, drops ERA to 72.00", ESPN, April 11, 2019)) Sandwiched between those games, the Nationals mounted a comeback from a five-run deficit on April 9. Down to his final strike, center fielder Víctor Robles, the Nationals' top prospect, hit a game-tying home run with two outs in the ninth inning off Edubray Ramos. Left fielder Juan Soto hammered a three-run home run, with Robles adding an RBI double, to give the Nationals the lead in the tenth inning before Doolittle secured the 10–6 win.

Bullpen woes again bedeviled the Nationals during a six-game homestand, which they split by losing two of three with the Pittsburgh Pirates and winning two of three with the San Francisco Giants. The bullpen collapsed late on April 12 after Corbin pitched seven strong innings and departed with a one-run lead; Tony Sipp and Kyle Barraclough combined to give up the tying and go-ahead runs, and after Rendon homered to force extra innings, Justin Miller coughed up a three-run home run to Pirates pinch-hitter Colin Moran in the tenth inning to lose the opening game of the homestand. Miller was placed on the 10-day injured list the next day with a lower back strain, and the Nationals recalled reliever Austen Williams from Fresno. In that game, it was the Nationals who rallied late, with back-to-back home runs by Eaton and Kendrick reversing a one-run deficit in the eighth inning and giving Washington a 3–2 win. After a third straight strong start for the Nationals in the series, this one provided by Scherzer, Suero allowed a two-out RBI double to rookie Jason Martin in the ninth, sending the home team to a 4–3 loss in the April 14 rubber game. The Nationals went on to drop their series-opener with the Giants on April 16, with Stephen Strasburg shouldering the loss after giving up three home runs over six innings of work. Manager Dave Martinez was ejected for the second time in his managerial career, arguing balls and strikes in the fifth inning. The Nationals won the next two games, although they didn't lack for late drama. After finishing out the eighth inning with a seven-run lead on April 17, Williams surrendered four runs on home runs by San Francisco outfielders Gerardo Parra and Steven Duggar before being pulled without recording an out. Barraclough and Doolittle combined to finish out the closer-than-expected 9–6 win. In the series finale on April 18, after the Nationals failed to score in the home eighth despite a leadoff double and steal of third base by Washington second baseman Brian Dozier, Doolittle wobbled to give up his first earned run of the season on three base hits before locking down the save, securing Corbin's first win at home as a National.

Heading to South Florida for a series against the division-rival Miami Marlins on April 19, the Nationals made another change in their bullpen, sending Williams to the injured list with a right shoulder sprain and recalling right-hander Austin L. Adams from Fresno. In the series opener, a bases-loaded walk by Aníbal Sánchez followed immediately by a hit-by-pitch by Grace in the sixth inning gave the Marlins a lead they wouldn't relinquish. A poor start by Scherzer led to a second consecutive loss on April 20, although the Nationals were able to salvage the three-game set the next day, shutting out the Marlins 5–0 behind eight strong innings from Strasburg in a bounceback outing. After optioning Austin L. Adams back to Fresno and recalling Noll as an extra infielder with Rendon dealing with soreness after a pitch struck his upper arm, Washington dropped yet another series opener on April 22 as they traveled to Denver for three games against the Colorado Rockies, as home runs by Raimel Tapia, Nolan Arenado, and former National Mark Reynolds proved too much for the visitors to overcome. With Corbin on the mound and a bases-clearing double by Robles making the difference, they evened the series the next day. Although Noll tagged his first major league hit, an RBI double, in his first start on April 24, another poor Aníbal Sánchez start, coupled with defensive lapses by Noll, fill-in shortstop Wilmer Difo, and the right fielder Eaton, followed by a disastrous three-run inning from Rosenthal in relief, resulted in a second straight series loss.

Returning home for a series against the San Diego Padres, the Nationals optioned Noll back to Fresno on April 25, then announced they were calling up Carter Kieboom from the Grizzlies to bolster their infield the following day. Injured reliever Koda Glover was transferred to the 60-day injured list to make room for Kieboom on the major league roster. The Nationals also moved Rosenthal to the 10-day injured list, citing a viral infection, and activated Miller after one rehab appearance with the Class-A Advanced Potomac Nationals. Scherzer allowed two runs over seven strong innings, and Kieboom homered to center for his first major league hit off Padres reliever and former National Craig Stammen (Note: Kieboom became the first Nationals player since Juan Soto to make his first career hit a home run. Soto was also facing the San Diego Padres when he accomplished the feat, homering off Robbie Erlin on May 21, 2018. (See "Nats' Soto, MLB's youngest player at 19, homers in 1st start", WTOP, May 21, 2018)) to tie the game in the eighth inning after San Diego took the lead on a Gomes passed ball. However, the Nationals fell after Doolittle, pitching in a tied ninth inning, allowed a solo home run to Padres outfielder Hunter Renfroe. In the April 27 game, Strasburg matched Scherzer's seven-inning effort, but Suero, Miller, and Grace combined to allow six runs in the tenth inning, and the Nationals lost 8–3. After placing first baseman Ryan Zimmerman on the 10-day injured list with plantar fasciitis in his right foot, the Nationals were greeted with six unanswered San Diego runs to start the April 28 game, as the home team got just three innings out of Hellickson. Facing their first series sweep of the season, the Nationals rallied behind home runs from Soto, Robles, and Kieboom to tie the game, (Note: It was the first time three teammates age 22 or under had homered in the same game in major league history. On the day of the game, Soto was 20 years, 185 days old; Kieboom was 21 years, 237 days old; and Robles was 21 years, 344 days old. (See Collier, Jamal, "21-and-under club: Soto, Kieboom, Robles HR", MLB.com, April 28, 2019, and Dougherty, Jesse, "A glimpse of the future: Young stars erase Nationals' six-run deficit in 11-inning win", The Washington Post, April 28, 2019)) with just-recalled right-hander Erick Fedde putting up four scoreless innings in long relief and Barraclough, Ross, Sipp, and Miller contributing scoreless innings of their own, before replacement first baseman Matt Adams slugged a deep flyball to right field off Matt Wisler in the bottom of the eleventh inning; Adams' shot clanged off the foul pole for a walk-off home run. Fedde was optioned back to Double-A Harrisburg the next day, and Adrián Sánchez was recalled. The Nationals proceeded to drop consecutive games to the St. Louis Cardinals, ending the month with a 12–16 record and in fourth place in the National League East. In the April 29 game, a strong four innings for Corbin led to a disastrous fifth in which he gave up six earned runs, the most for the Nationals left-hander in nearly a full year, and took the loss against visiting St. Louis. Ahead of another loss on April 30, the Nationals finally placed Rendon on the 10-day injured list as he continued to reel from his hit-by-pitch arm injury from the Marlins series, and they selected the contract of left-hander Dan Jennings from Harrisburg, designating Austin L. Adams for assignment to clear space on the roster.

=== May ===
The Nationals salvaged their four-game series with the St. Louis Cardinals, having lost three of four before capturing a tight 2–1 series finale on March 2 behind right-hander Stephen Strasburg. (Note: Strasburg became the fastest pitcher to reach 1,500 career strikeouts in the series win, as measured by innings pitched. He earned his 1,500th by striking out opposing pitcher Dakota Hudson in the fifth inning, at 1,272 1/3 innings pitched in his major league career. The previous record was held by Chris Sale, who notched his 1,500th strikeout at 1,290 innings pitched. (See Mears, Steve, "Strasburg sets a 1,500 K record; Nats win 2–1 to salvage the series! Pitching coach Derek Lilliquist fired!", talknats.com, May 2, 2019)) After the series, the Nationals dismissed pitching coach Derek Lilliquist and announced he would be replaced by minor league pitching coordinator Paul Menhart.

The fourth-place Nationals' woes continued on a roadtrip through Philadelphia, Milwaukee, and Los Angeles. Left fielder Juan Soto landed on the 10-day injured list on May 4 with back spasms, prompting the Nationals to recall outfielder Andrew Stevenson from the Triple-A Fresno Grizzlies; a day later, the Nationals placed first baseman Matt Adams on the injured list after he jammed his shoulder on a defensive play against the Philadelphia Phillies and recalled infielder Jake Noll from Fresno. Stevenson lasted a week on the active roster before hitting the injured list with back spasms of his own, while left-handed setup man Tony Sipp was sent to the injured list with an oblique injury on May 7. The Nationals activated third baseman Anthony Rendon from the injured list on May 7, optioning top infield prospect Carter Kieboom back to Fresno after he committed four errors in 11 major league games, and also recalled right-handed pitcher Erick Fedde from the Double-A Harrisburg Senators. Like Joe Ross before him, Fedde was converted from starting to relieving by the Nationals, hoping to bolster their worst-in-MLB bullpen. After losing two of three in Philadelphia and suffering their first series sweep at the hands of the Milwaukee Brewers, a series in which poor defense played a major role, the Nationals signed outfielder Gerardo Parra to a one-year deal, designating Grizzlies reliever Jimmy Cordero for assignment, before a four-game set against the Los Angeles Dodgers. The Nationals won the series opener in a 6–0 shutout led by left-hander Patrick Corbin. The Dodgers returned the favor on May 10, with starter Kenta Maeda and left fielder Joc Pederson leading Los Angeles to a 5–0 win. On May 11, the visitors rallied after being shut out into the eighth inning, scoring five runs off the Dodgers bullpen after starter Walker Buehler left the game. The scoring was capped by a go-ahead grand slam to right-center field by Parra, his first hit as a National in his second start with the team, off reliever Dylan Floro. However, the Dodgers again quieted Washington's bats, 6–0, on May 12 to earn a series split behind Hyun-jin Ryu. The Dodgers starter carried a no-hit bid into the eighth inning before Parra hit a ground-rule double for the Nationals' only hit of the day. Soto was activated from the injured list for the final game of the series.

It was more of the same in the first game of a homestand versus the division-rival New York Mets on May 14. Noah Syndergaard held the Nationals hitless into the sixth inning, and former National Wilson Ramos, the Mets catcher, hit a grand slam off Jeremy Hellickson in the first inning to supply all the offense the Mets needed in the 6–2 win. The Nationals rebounded to win the next two games for their first series win of the month, with Corbin turning in another potent effort to earn the win on May 15 and Washington surviving an early exit by starter Aníbal Sánchez to win a tight 7–6 contest, again getting key offense from Parra and catcher Kurt Suzuki, in the rubber game on May 16. With the Chicago Cubs heading to town for a three-game series, the Nationals placed Aníbal Sánchez on the injured list with a hamstring strain and called up right-hander Kyle McGowin from Triple-A Fresno, also activating shortstop Trea Turner after he rehabbed a fractured finger and optioning Turner's struggling fill-in, Wilmer Difo, to Fresno. The Nationals attempted a comeback after right-hander Max Scherzer was shelled for three runs early on May 18, but Brian Dozier was tagged out trying to score from third on an errant pitch that ricocheted back to reliever Carl Edwards Jr., then the home bullpen melted down. The Cubs ran away with the series opener 14–6, scoring 11 runs off Nationals relievers. (Note: Cubs third baseman Kris Bryant homered in the seventh, eighth, and ninth innings, becoming only the 12th player in major league history to homer in three consecutive innings. (See "Kris Bryant hits 3 home runs, Cubs punish Nationals 14–6", WGN-TV, May 17, 2019)) The Nationals placed reliever Justin Miller on the injured list for the second time of the young season with a rotator cuff strain the next day and called up right-handed reliever Tanner Rainey from Fresno. In the May 18 game, Strasburg delivered eight innings of two-run ball to lead the Nationals to a win. The Nationals again attempted a comeback after Hellickson opened his May 19 outing with three straight walks and gave up three runs before McGowin relieved him in the fourth inning, but they came up short in a 6–5 loss despite scoring four runs off Cubs starter Kyle Hendricks.

Heading to New York City for another series against the Mets, on May 20, the Nationals designated Dan Jennings for assignment after he appeared in eight games out of their bullpen, activated Sipp from the injured list, and claimed right-handed pitcher Javy Guerra off waivers from the Toronto Blue Jays. Hellickson was placed on the injured list with a shoulder strain, clearing space for Guerra on the roster. The Mets swept the four-game set against the Nationals. Corbin lost a rematch with Mets journeyman starter Wilmer Font in the series opener, with the Nationals rallying late from a four-run shutout only to lose 4–3. In each of the next three games, the Nationals lost despite carrying a lead into the bottom of the eighth inning. After five scoreless innings from Fedde, making a spot start, on May 21, reliever Wander Suero served up a three-run home run that gave the Mets the lead, and after the Nationals rallied to retake the lead, Rainey gave up a solo home run to rookie first baseman Pete Alonso in the eighth, put two more runners on base when called out to pitch the ninth, and then took his first career loss as Kyle Barraclough came in and gave up a walk-off hit on an infield single to shortstop. On May 22, the Nationals got six shutout innings from Scherzer and held a one-run shutout into the eighth, before Barraclough and closer Sean Doolittle combined to give up six unanswered runs to lose the game, with center fielder Juan Lagares doubling home three runs off Doolittle before the southpaw served up a three-run home run to veteran pinch-hitter Rajai Davis in his first appearance with the Mets. The Nationals trailed by two runs heading into the eighth inning in the final game of the set on May 23, but after first baseman Howie Kendrick and manager Dave Martinez were ejected for arguing a checked-swing call, the team rallied and got a two-out, two-run single by Parra, pinch-hitting for Strasburg, to take the lead. That lead was handed back in the bottom of the inning as Suero, after getting two outs and two strikes on right fielder Carlos Gómez, served up a three-run home run to take the loss. The Nationals were rejoined during the series by Matt Adams, who was activated from the injured list and took the place of infielder Adrián Sánchez, who was optioned to Double-A Harrisburg.

As the Nationals returned to Washington, D.C., to face the division-rival Miami Marlins, with a 19-31 (.380) record and a 3.4% chance to win the World Series, local and national media speculation swirled around Martinez's future as the team manager. Two veteran Washington Post sports columnists, Thomas Boswell and Barry Svrluga, suggested the Nationals should dismiss Martinez, with Boswell writing, "From Day 1, he has been just a step too far beyond his depth." General manager Mike Rizzo said publicly before the start of the series against the Marlins that the Nationals were not considering a change less than one-third of the way through the 2019 season. The Nationals bounced back to win the first three of the four games against Miami, overcoming a shaky spot start by McGowin, who tallied his first career hit and run scored in his only trip to the plate, to win a seesaw 12–10 series opener on the back of a go-ahead home run by Soto in the eighth inning; shutting down the Marlins 5–0 behind a complete-game performance from Corbin on May 25; and winning three games in a row for the first time all year by clinching a series win on May 26, despite a shaky major league debut for right-handed reliever James Bourque, who was called up from Harrisburg as Ross was optioned to Fresno, but couldn't make it through the ninth inning in his first appearance. Scherzer pitched well in the series finale and exited the game with a one-run lead, but the Marlins scored two unearned runs as Adams and Turner committed ill-timed fielding errors, and Miami salvaged the set by delivering the Nationals a 3–2 loss.

The Nationals headed south for two games against the only division rival they had not yet played in 2019, the Atlanta Braves, and swept the short series. Despite another eighth-inning hiccup on May 28 as Barraclough gave up a two-run home run, Doolittle bounced back from a pair of rough outings, showing off a tweaked delivery as he secured a save and a win for Strasburg, who outdueled Atlanta ace Max Fried with seven strong innings. Aníbal Sánchez returned from the injured list on May 29, with Bourque being optioned to Fresno in a corresponding move, and carried a perfect game into the sixth inning as the Nationals put up 14 runs over the first five frames. Although McGowin, taking over in relief in the seventh inning, loaded the bases and gave up a grand slam to third baseman Austin Riley before getting his first out, he struck out six more Braves en route to his first career save as he pitched three innings to finish off the 14–4 victory. The win was Sánchez's first as a National. Coming off their series sweep of the Braves, the Nationals finished out a 12–17 May with a loss as the Cincinnati Reds chased a flat-looking Corbin in the third inning and cruised to victory at Great American Ball Park. At month's end, the Nationals held fourth place in the National League East Division, eight games back of the division-leading Phillies and eight games under the .500 mark.

=== June ===
Rebounding from their series-opening loss to the Cincinnati Reds at Great American Ball Park, the Nationals took the next two games for their third straight series win. Former National Tanner Roark, starting for the Reds, took the loss on June 1, despite hitting his first career home run off Nationals starter Erick Fedde; the player for whom Roark was traded to Cincinnati in December 2018, right-hander Tanner Rainey, earned his first career win in relief. Center fielder Gerardo Parra hit a three-run home run off Roark to put the Nationals on top for good. In the rubber game on June 2, Nationals ace Max Scherzer struck out 15 Reds over eight innings of one-run ball to lead Washington to victory. Manager Dave Martinez made a trip to the mound with Scherzer at 117 pitches through 7 2/3 innings, but Scherzer lobbied successfully to stay in the game before striking out Reds first baseman Joey Votto on back-to-back-to-back called strikes.

The Nationals swept a short homestand, taking two of two in interleague play against the visiting Chicago White Sox. In the series opener on June 4, they pinned a loss on another former Nationals starter, Reynaldo López, delivering home starter Stephen Strasburg his 100th career win even though he allowed every White Sox run in the 9–5 game. After a strong start by Aníbal Sánchez in the second game, the league-worst Nationals bullpen couldn't hold the lead, with right-hander Kyle Barraclough surrendering a two-run home run in his second inning of work, followed by Wander Suero, who had thrown 30 pitches in the June 4 game, allowing a game-tying home run to White Sox backup catcher Welington Castillo on his first pitch after coming in to relieve Barraclough. The Nationals rallied, however, as shortstop Trea Turner drilled a two-run home run—his first since coming off the injured list the previous month after rehabbing a fractured finger—to walk off the White Sox in the bottom of the ninth inning, 6–4. The sweep gave the Nationals their longest winning streak of the season to date, at four games.

The Nationals split a four-game series in San Diego against the San Diego Padres. Despite jumping out to a four-run lead in the first inning against Padres starter Joey Lucchesi, the Nationals couldn't push across another run and lost as their starter Corbin gave up five unanswered runs, in the series opener June 6. The Nationals lost another 5–4 game on June 7, rallying to take the lead late only for closer Sean Doolittle to give up the tying run on an RBI single by rookie outfielder Josh Naylor followed by a walk-off RBI single by catcher Austin Hedges. On June 8, the Nationals cruised behind another strong outing by Scherzer, who shrugged off a comebacker that deflected off his left calf to pitch seven shutout innings and earn the win. In the rubber game on June 9, the Nationals got seven innings of one-run ball from San Diego native Strasburg, then tagged former Nationals pitcher Craig Stammen with the loss in relief in the eighth inning as pinch-hitter Howie Kendrick broke the tie with a home run to left field, shortstop Trea Turner homered to center in the next at-bat, right fielder Adam Eaton homered to right-center in the at-bat after that, and third baseman Anthony Rendon capped the barrage with a home run to right field. (Note: It was the ninth time a major league team had hit back-to-back-to-back-to-back home runs, and the first time a major league team had ever hit back-to-back-to-back-to-back home runs for the second time in its history. The most recent instance was when Brian Goodwin, Wilmer Difo, Bryce Harper, and Ryan Zimmerman, also of the Washington Nationals, homered consecutively off Michael Blazek of the Milwaukee Brewers on July 27, 2017. (See Dougherty, Jesse, "Nationals make MLB history with four consecutive home runs in win over Padres", The Washington Post, June 9, 2019, and Goldberg, Rob, "Video: Watch Nationals Crush 4 Consecutive Home Runs vs. Padres", Bleacher Report, June 9, 2019)) During the series, the Nationals activated reliever Trevor Rosenthal after a monthlong rehab assignment, optioning right-hander Kyle McGowin to the Triple-A Fresno Grizzlies.

Although Washington steamrolled the White Sox 12–1 on June 10 behind another dominant start from Sánchez, Corbin's struggles continued as he allowed a first-inning grand slam by Castillo, and the Nationals settled for a split of the two-game interleague series in Chicago as they lost June 11. Rookie center fielder Víctor Robles earned his first career Major League Baseball Play of the Week Award with a diving catch behind Corbin, tracking down a hard-hit line drive from Leury García, leaping to glove it, and ending up face-down on the warning track surrounded by a cloud of dust.

The Nationals split their third series in a row as they hosted the Arizona Diamondbacks. Veteran Zack Greinke, who carried a no-hit bid into the seventh inning, outdueled Fedde in the series opener on June 13. Arizona worked around a rain delay to shut out the home team 5–0. With Scherzer, a 2006 first-round draft pick of the Diamondbacks, on the mound against former Nationals top prospect Robbie Ray, the Nationals evened the series the next day. Strasburg turned in his worst outing of the year as he allowed six runs over five innings on June 15, taking the loss for the Nationals even though rookie Diamondbacks starter Taylor Clarke, who grew up in Northern Virginia a fan of Strasburg and the Nationals, couldn't complete five full innings to qualify for the win. Following another poor relief appearance by Barraclough, who gave up three runs in the ninth inning while only recording one out, the Nationals placed him on the 10-day injured list with right radial nerve inflammation and summoned utilityman Adrián Sánchez the next morning. Washington ran away with the fourth and final game of the series 15–5, with Aníbal Sánchez pitching effectively and first baseman Matt Adams supplying almost half the offense, with seven RBIs on a three-run home run off reliever Zack Godley and a grand slam off Stefan Crichton.

With the Nationals preparing to play three straight series against National League East Division rivals, rainy weather in Washington, D.C., abbreviated a four-game set with the Philadelphia Phillies, as two games were rained out with one being rescheduled for September 24. While taking bunting practice on June 18 before that day's game was officially rained out, Scherzer fouled a ball back into his face, leaving him with a broken nose and a swollen right eye—for the heterochromatic ace, his blue eye. The Nationals swept a doubleheader on June 19 against the visiting Phillies, with a resurgent Corbin dominating the matinee and Scherzer, pitching with a black eye from his injury the day before, leading a shutout in the evening. Washington completed the series sweep the following day, overcoming a shaky start by Fedde, who exited in the fourth inning.

Preparing for a three-game series against the Atlanta Braves on June 21, the Nationals optioned infielder Adrián Sánchez to the Double-A Harrisburg Senators and called up right-hander Joe Ross from Triple-A Fresno. The Nationals extended their winning streak to a season-high five games as Strasburg bested former Cy Young Award-winning southpaw Dallas Keuchel, who was making his season debut after the Braves signed him earlier in the month. Despite letting the first two batters in the ninth inning reach base, Suero retired the side to earn his first major league save, with the final out being recorded on a shallow flyball by the sliding right fielder Robles. On June 22, with a chance to simultaneously secure a series win against the division-leading Braves and get back to a .500 record for the season, the Nationals jumped out to a four-run lead behind former Brave Aníbal Sánchez, only for their league-worst bullpen to once again melt down. Rosenthal and Rainey combined to give up the lead in the seventh inning, with Rosenthal walking all three batters he faced before Rainey walked shortstop Dansby Swanson to force in a run and then gave up a bases-clearing double to first baseman Freddie Freeman. Entering for the eighth inning with a one-run lead, Ross gave up four runs, including a three-run Swanson homer, to take the loss. Matt Grace coughed up one final Atlanta run in the ninth inning, and the Nationals lost 13–9. The next day, the Nationals bought out Rosenthal's club option for the 2020 season and released him. Martinez told reporters the Nationals decided it was "time to move on" as Rosenthal continued to struggle with his command despite his lengthy rehab stint with Double-A Harrisburg. The Nationals also optioned Ross back to Fresno, recalling McGowin and fellow right-hander Austin Voth, who was tasked with the June 23 spot start. Showing a marked improvement in his velocity from the previous season as his fastball topped 95 miles per hour (153 km/h) throughout his six innings, Voth pitched well, striking out a career-high seven batters while allowing just two runs, both solo homers, on four hits. Rainey took the loss as he gave up two runs in the top of the tenth inning and the Nationals left the tying and winning runs on base against Braves closer Luke Jackson.

Heading to Florida for three games with the Miami Marlins, the Nationals optioned Fedde to Triple-A Fresno, giving Voth a longer look in the rotation. They also optioned McGowin back to Fresno, transferred injured starting pitcher Jeremy Hellickson to the 60-day injured list, and selected the contracts of veteran relievers Fernando Rodney, who became the oldest player in MLB at 42 years old as he joined the Nationals in Miami, and Jonny Venters. Rodney made his Nationals debut as the only reliever to pitch in the June 25 series opener, getting the ball in the ninth inning after Scherzer threw eight innings of one-run ball. He walked his first batter before getting a strikeout and a double play to finish off the 6–1 win. The Nationals rolled to a sweep over the bottom-feeding Marlins, winning June 26 behind a similarly dominant Corbin, as the offense finally got to Marlins starter Zac Gallen after the rookie right-hander pitched five scoreless innings; then repeating the formula against Sandy Alcántara in the series finale the next day. In both games, the Nationals mounted sixth-inning rallies that proved decisive, and in both, they centered around a three-run home run by the first baseman Adams. With the series sweep, the Nationals clawed back to a .500 record for the first time since April 23.

The Nationals finished June with a winning record, taking two of three in interleague play against the Detroit Tigers. They activated first baseman Ryan Zimmerman to serve as the designated hitter in the first two games of the series, optioning backup outfielder Michael A. Taylor to Double-A Harrisburg as a corresponding roster move. Former Tigers Sánchez and Scherzer earned the wins for the Nationals in the series, holding the home team to one run apiece in starts on June 28 and June 30, respectively. Scherzer struck out 14 over eight innings in his start to secure the series win, after the loss on June 29, in which Voth struggled en route to a fifth-inning hook and then Rainey and left-handed reliever Tony Sipp combined to lose the late lead. Having gone 18–8 in June, their first winning month since September 2018 and their best record since May 2018, Washington finished the month with a 42–41 record, good for third place in the National League East. Scherzer and Rendon were named to the All-Star Game roster for the National League, although both declined to participate, citing minor injuries.

=== July ===
After posting their best monthly record in more than a year in June, the Nationals jumped out to a 5–1 record for July heading into the All-Star Break with a three-game sweep of the division-rival Miami Marlins and two out of three versus the Kansas City Royals in interleague play.

In the series opener against the Marlins on July 2, Nationals starter Patrick Corbin temporarily changed his number from his usual #46 to #45 in honor of his friend and former teammate, Los Angeles Angels pitcher Tyler Skaggs, who died the previous day of a drug overdose. He spun seven innings of one-run ball in a no-decision. In the ninth inning of the dramatic game, shortstop Trea Turner cracked a double into the gap to score catcher Yan Gomes all the way from first base, walking off the visitors. Starter Max Scherzer was placed on the paternity leave the next day for the birth of his second child, daughter Kacey, and the Nationals recalled infielder Adrián Sánchez from the Double-A Harrisburg Senators. With dominant pitching performances from Stephen Strasburg on July 3, who threw his first immaculate inning and the fourth in Nationals history, (Note: Previous immaculate innings were thrown by Jordan Zimmermann and Max Scherzer. Zimmermann struck out three Florida Marlins on nine pitches on May 6, 2011. Scherzer accomplished the feat against the Philadelphia Phillies on May 14, 2017, then again versus the Tampa Bay Rays on June 5, 2018. With Strasburg's immaculate inning, the Nationals surpassed their former incarnation, the Montreal Expos (with three), in immaculate innings pitched. (See Matz, Eddie, "Strasburg tosses first career 'immaculate inning'", ESPN, July 3, 2019)) and former Marlin Aníbal Sánchez in the special Independence Day matinee on July 4, the Nationals completed the sweep of the Marlins before hosting the Royals for three games.

Rookie right-hander Austin Voth, the Nationals' fifth starter, struggled en route to a second straight early exit on July 5, but he ended up with a no-decision as the home team rallied to force extra innings, only to lose 7–4 as an RBI single by Royals shortstop Adalberto Mondesi off left-handed reliever Jonny Venters, followed later by a two-run error by first baseman Ryan Zimmerman on an errant throw home, allowed Kansas City to retake the lead in the eleventh inning. The Nationals stranded 19 runners in the game, leaving the bases loaded in the sixth, seventh, and tenth innings. On July 6, the Nationals celebrated the 50th anniversary of the franchise by honoring the 1969 Montreal Expos. They wore similar uniforms to the 1969 Expos and dressed up the scoreboard to look like the original scoreboard at Jarry Park Stadium. Other changes including offering food traditional to Montreal, doing announcements on the scoreboard and in the stadium in English and French as well as a bilingual version of the Canadian anthem and an instrumental guitar version of "The Star-Spangled Banner", showing Expos highlights on the TVs in the concourse, putting an Expos cap on the bullpen cart, and dressing up the mascots in Expos uniforms. Vladimir Guerrero threw out the first pitch to Nationals manager Dave Martinez, and a handful of players who played for the Expos were honored at a pregame ceremony. The event was also presided over by Canada's deputy ambassador to the United States, Kirsten Hillman. Not missing a start despite his daughter's birth, Scherzer returned to dominate the Royals on July 6, leading a shutout of the visitors while also singling and stealing a base in the fourth inning. Voth was optioned to Double-A Harrisburg to clear a roster spot for Scherzer. On July 7, it was Corbin's turn to dominate for the Nationals, although he ended up with a no-decision after seven scoreless innings when relievers Fernando Rodney and Sean Doolittle combined to blow the lead in the eighth inning. Rodney allowed a run before being relieved, and Royals left fielder Alex Gordon rifled Doolittle's first pitch out to the scoreboard in center-right field for an RBI double. The Nationals rallied in the bottom of the eighth inning, however, as right fielder Adam Eaton slid under the tag to take the lead on a double by All-Star third baseman Anthony Rendon off Royals reliever Jake Diekman. Eaton was greeted at the plate by Scherzer, who admitted after the game he hadn't been paying close attention to the score and thought it was a walk-off win in the ninth inning. Pinch-hitter Howie Kendrick, inserted into the game for a favorable matchup against the left-hander Diekman, plated two more runs with a double of his own before Doolittle pitched a scoreless ninth inning to secure the series win and send the Nationals victorious into the break.

Venters was placed on the injured list during the break with left shoulder inflammation, and the Nationals recalled right-hander Kyle McGowin from Double-A Harrisburg. On July 13, Scherzer was placed on the injured list with a back injury that was ultimately diagnosed as inflammation in the bursa sac under his right shoulder blade. The Nationals recalled catcher and first baseman Spencer Kieboom from Double-A Harrisburg to fill his roster spot temporarily, although Kieboom did not see game action before being optioned back to the minor leagues on July 16. In the meantime, the Nationals opened a four-game series with the division-rival Philadelphia Phillies by shutting them out 4–0 behind a Strasburg gem on July 12, then rallied in the ninth inning on July 13 as left fielder Juan Soto slugged a go-ahead two-run home run off Phillies closer Héctor Neris, leading the Nationals to a 4–3 win. It was the Washington bullpen that sprung a leak in the series finale July 14, however, as Philadelphia third baseman Maikel Franco capped an impressive series by homering off Nationals left-hander Matt Grace for a walk-off win in the bottom of the ninth.

The Nationals continued their East Coast roadtrip by visiting the Baltimore Orioles for their annual interleague "Battle of the Beltways" rivalry. Voth, recalled to pitch in place of Scherzer, earned his first win of the year with six innings of one-run ball on July 16. While Erick Fedde, called up for a spot start the following day (Adrián Sánchez was optioned in a corresponding move), matched Voth's effort, the Nationals' offense was flat and the bullpen collapsed to allow eight runs after Fedde left the game, handing Baltimore a 9–2 win and series split. Wander Suero, who took the loss in relief, admitted after the game that he had received bad news of a personal nature before the game, hadn't told his coaches, and struggled to focus on his pitching.

As they had in Philadelphia, the Nationals opened a four-game set against the division-leading Atlanta Braves with a big win behind Strasburg, running up the score on starter Kyle Wright and reliever Touki Toussaint. Strasburg led off the third inning with a single up the middle off Wright, and after the Nationals batted around, he came to bat again versus Toussaint with two runners on base. Strasburg unloaded on a fastball for a 420-foot home run to left field, his longest career home run and his first since the 2017 season. In his third at-bat of the game, he added a two-run single, giving him five RBIs in the game. (Note: Strasburg was the first pitcher with at least five RBIs in a game since Madison Bumgarner for the San Francisco Giants against the Colorado Rockies on April 11, 2014, as well as the first pitcher with two hits including a home run in the same inning since Edwin Jackson for the Arizona Diamondbacks against the Pittsburgh Pirates on April 11, 2010. (See Baer, Bill, "Stephen Strasburg homers, knocks in five runs vs. Braves", NBC Sports, July 18, 2019, and "Strasburg gets 2 hits in one inning, including HR", ESPN, July 19, 2019)) While the Braves pitched more effectively on July 19, with Julio Teherán shutting the Nationals out through five innings before being chased in the sixth inning, the Nationals rallied in the ninth inning. Down to their final out, the Nationals sent rookie center fielder Víctor Robles to the plate, and he hammered a two-run home run off Atlanta closer Luke Jackson to tie the game. However, reluctant to use Doolittle, his closer, in a tied game on the road, Martinez opted to try to get a second inning out of Rodney after a scoreless eighth inning. Rodney loaded the bases on two walks and a single before surrendering a walk-off single to third baseman Josh Donaldson, with Doolittle still warming in the bullpen. "Rodney is the eighth-inning guy and Doolittle is your closer," Martinez explained after the game. On July 20, however, Martinez went to Doolittle for a five-out save after getting two scoreless innings from Suero and an out in the eighth inning from Rodney. Doolittle notched the save without drama, getting an extra insurance run from right fielder Adam Eaton in the top of the ninth inning as the Nationals won 5–3. Forced to turn to another spot starter with Scherzer still recuperating and Voth landing on the injured list with a shoulder injury of his own, the Nationals recalled Joe Ross from Triple-A Fresno for his first start of the season on July 21. With the Nationals effectively stymied by Braves starter Kevin Gausman, Ross gave up three runs in 5 1/3 innings and took the loss, the first for a Nationals starter in more than a month. (Note: Nationals starters went 27 games without being saddled with a loss, a streak that matched the record set by the New York Giants during the 1916 season. (See Dougherty, Jesse, "Nationals settle for a series split with the Braves after getting routed, 7–1, in the finale", The Washington Post, July 21, 2019)) The first baseman Zimmerman aggravated the plantar fasciitis in his right foot during the game and landed on the injured list the next day, with the Nationals also optioning McGowin to Double-A Harrisburg after he allowed two runs in an inning of work, recalling outfielder Andrew Stevenson from Triple-A Fresno, and selecting the contract of veteran pitcher Michael Blazek from Fresno's bullpen.

The Nationals ended up playing four games in three days against the Colorado Rockies after the commissioner's office elected to postpone the scheduled July 22 series opener due to rain in the forecast at Nationals Park. Behind a dominant start by Strasburg and Turner's second career cycle (Note: Turner previously hit for the cycle on April 25, 2017, also against the Colorado Rockies, at Coors Field in Denver. He became the 26th player in Major League Baseball to hit for the cycle more than once, the third to do it twice against the same team, the first to do it twice against the Rockies franchise, and the first to hit for the cycle against the Rockies away from Coors Field. (See Matz, Eddie, "Nats' Turner hits for another cycle against Rockies", ESPN.com, July 23, 2019; "Trea Turner hits for the cycle as Nationals rout Rockies", USA Today, July 23, 2019; and Anderson, R.J., "Nationals' Trea Turner becomes 26th player in history to record multiple cycles", CBSSports.com, July 23, 2019)) the Nationals shellacked Colorado 11–1 in the series opener on July 23. The Nationals also swept the impromptu doubleheader on July 24, with Doolittle recording the save in both of the low-scoring contests. Catcher Raudy Read was recalled in place of Fedde, who started the matinee game and was optioned before the evening game, and he flew out as a pinch-hitter in his first major league appearance since September 2017. With Read returning to Triple-A Fresno, Scherzer was activated for the series finale on July 25. He gave up three runs in five hits, admitting after the game that he still didn't feel like he was at his best. The Nationals rallied more than once in the game, with Rendon clocking a three-run home run to pick up the Nationals' ailing ace, then pinch-hitter Gerardo Parra hitting a clutch two-run double after Grace gave up another pair of runs. Martinez decided to turn to Rodney for the save after the 42-year-old veteran had pitched in both ends of the July 24 doubleheader. However, Rodney almost immediately blew the save by giving up a solo home run to former National Ian Desmond to start the top of the ninth inning, then took the loss after another former National, Daniel Murphy, legged out a potential inning-ending double play for an RBI infield single.

Starting July 26, the Nationals hosted another opponent from the National League West Division, the league-leading Los Angeles Dodgers. Despite seven brilliant innings from Aníbal Sánchez, who gave up a run in the first inning before working out of a bases-loaded jam en route to retiring 20 straight Dodgers, the Nationals offense could only muster one run off Los Angeles ace Hyun-Jin Ryu, leaving the game in the hands of both teams' bullpens. With two outs in the eighth inning, Martinez turned to veteran left-hander Tony Sipp to face two left-handed batters. After Sipp allowed both batters to reach base, Martinez pulled him in favor of Kyle Barraclough, for whom the Nationals had swapped out Stevenson before the game to restock their depleted bullpen. Barraclough gave up a three-run home run to Justin Turner, and the Dodgers cruised to victory. Barraclough was optioned back to Double-A Harrisburg the next day, as the Nationals recalled Adrián Sánchez. In the July 27 contest, trying to even the series against former Cy Young Award-winning southpaw Clayton Kershaw, Martinez deployed Grace as a two-inning "opener" against the Dodgers' lefty-heavy lineup before bringing in the day's presumptive starting pitcher, Ross, who was known to struggle against left-handed hitters. While Grace started the game with two perfect innings, Ross was hammered over his 4 2/3 innings of work, giving up seven runs. The Dodgers tacked on two more runs against reliever Javy Guerra to win 9–3. The Nationals managed to salvage the series as Strasburg allowed just one run over seven innings, matching that by driving in a run of his own, in the July 28 finale. Despite losing both Eaton and Martinez, who were ejected by home plate umpire Jeremie Rehak in the first inning after taking issue with Rehak's strike zone, as well as starting first baseman Matt Adams, who exited the game after fouling a ball off his foot and later running into an out at home, the Nationals woke up the bats starting in the fifth inning, and Strasburg outdueled Dodgers right-hander Walker Buehler, who gave up key hits to former teammate Brian Dozier as well as Robles and Kendrick, who had been slated for days off but entered as replacements for Eaton and Adams respectively. The Nationals won 11–4, with Blazek coughing up a three-run home run to Dodgers shortstop Corey Seager before finishing out the game in the ninth inning. With Scherzer continuing to experience discomfort because of a balky back and right shoulder, following the series, the Nationals placed their ace back on the injured list with a rhomboid strain and recalled Fedde from Double-A Harrisburg to rejoin the rotation.

The Nationals opened another series against the division-leading Braves on July 29 with a 6–3 win behind Corbin and Rendon, who smashed a go-ahead grand slam off Atlanta reliever Chad Sobotka in the sixth inning. However, they dropped the last two games of the series and homestand. Atlanta jumped all over Fedde in his start on July 30, scoring nine runs off him and chasing him from the game in the fourth inning. While the Nationals rallied to bring the final score within three, the Braves held on for the win to even the series. They captured the finale in similar fashion, getting to Aníbal Sánchez early and then hammering the final nail into the coffin off Washington's league-worst bullpen. The Nationals were able to chip away at the lead but made little of two prime scoring opportunities, as third base coach Bob Henley sent the sluggish Kendrick home from first in the sixth inning on a Turner double only for him to be out at the plate by several feet, then Parra grounded into a bases-loaded, no-outs double play in the ninth inning that tied the game against Jackson but failed to push across the winning run from scoring position. In the tenth inning, Doolittle gave up a solo home run to Donaldson for the game's final score. With the loss, the Nationals fell seven games behind the Braves, in second place in the National League East but just half a game ahead of the third-place Phillies. All told, they went 15–10 in July, putting together two winning months for the first time since August–September 2017, and finished the month with a 57–51 record for the season. Strasburg was named National League Pitcher of the Month with a 1.14 ERA and a .571 slugging percentage in July.

July 31 was also the MLB trade deadline. For the first time, the deadline applied to both waiver and non-waiver trades. Although the Nationals were publicly connected to top relievers like Shane Greene of the Detroit Tigers, Kirby Yates of the San Diego Padres, and Sam Dyson and Will Smith of the San Francisco Giants, they ultimately did not make a play in the high-end relief market, instead opting for a trio of lower-profile pickups hours before the final deadline: Daniel Hudson, a setup man for the Toronto Blue Jays, and closers Roenis Elías and Hunter Strickland of the Seattle Mariners, all of whom were acquired for minor league pitching prospects. Washington general manager Mike Rizzo acknowledged that he was constrained by the team's commitment not to exceed the competitive balance threshold, as it had in 2017 and 2018, and he noted that Hudson, Elías, and Strickland were added without the Nationals having to give up any of their top prospects, with the highest-ranked minor league player they traded being Triple-A left-handed reliever Taylor Guilbeau as part of Seattle's return. Rizzo did not consummate any other trades at the deadline, sticking with the Nationals' slate of starting pitchers despite Scherzer, Voth, and Jeremy Hellickson's nagging injuries and not making any changes to their group of position players.

=== August ===
Prior to opening a series at Chase Field with the Arizona Diamondbacks, the Nationals added newly acquired relievers Roenis Elías, Daniel Hudson, and Hunter Strickland to the active roster. Journeyman relievers Michael Blazek, Javy Guerra, and Tony Sipp were designated for assignment to clear roster space for Elías, Hudson, and Strickland. Struggling right-hander Joe Ross turned in his best outing of the season to date on August 2 and was rewarded with his first win of 2019, leading the visitors to a 3–0 shutout win over Arizona and allowing just one hit, an infield single by Diamondbacks starting pitcher Alex Young, despite walking five batters. However, after relieving Ross, inducing a flyout, and then striking out Diamondbacks right fielder Adam Jones, Elías was called upon to bat for himself in the seventh inning, with the Nationals carrying a short bench. Although manager Dave Martinez claimed later that he told Elías not to swing the bat, Elías hit a groundball to second base and pulled up lame at first base with what was eventually diagnosed as a hamstring strain. The next day, the Diamondbacks evened the series, scoring nine runs off Nationals co-ace Stephen Strasburg, the reigning National League Pitcher of the Month. (Note: The nine earned runs allowed matched a career high for Strasburg, previously set August 17, 2016, against the Colorado Rockies. (See Zuckerman, Mark "Strasburg takes another beating from D-backs in 18–7 rout", MASN, August 3, 2019)) With the Nationals trailing by nine runs in the bottom of the eighth inning, Martinez called on outfielder Gerardo Parra to make his major league debut as a relief pitcher. Despite hitting 91 miles per hour (146 km/h) on the stadium radar gun, Parra was unable to find the strikezone, walking in Diamondbacks reliever Zack Godley before Brian Dozier, normally the Nationals' second baseman, relieved him. Dozier allowed all three inherited runners to score and gave up a three-run home run to former Minnesota Twins teammate Eduardo Escobar before retiring the side. The Diamondbacks won 18–7 despite Godley allowing a three-run homer by Nationals third baseman Anthony Rendon in the ninth inning. Former Diamondback Patrick Corbin fared little better than Strasburg in his first Chase Field appearance in a new uniform, giving up five earned runs and being chased from the game in the sixth inning, although it was reliever Wander Suero who took the loss, allowing a two-out, two-run double to Jones to break the deadlock in the seventh inning. The Nationals departed Arizona having lost their third straight series, as well as having lost Elías and infielder Howie Kendrick to hamstring injuries. The team added Guerra, a Phoenix resident who had yet to report to the Triple-A Fresno Grizzlies after being outrighted, back to the roster and also recalled outfielder Andrew Stevenson to take Kendrick's place on the bench.

The Nationals continued their swing through the National League West Division by sweeping a three-game series against the San Francisco Giants at Oracle Park. Right-hander Erick Fedde, following Ross' example, rebounded from a dreadful start against the Atlanta Braves the week prior to lead the Nationals in a 4–0 win over the Giants on August 5, as the visitors knocked out San Francisco starter Jeff Samardzija early and kept the pressure on to shut out the Giants. Before the second game of the series, the Nationals brought in some reinforcements, optioning utilityman Adrián Sánchez to the Double-A Harrisburg Senators and reuniting with veteran infielder Asdrúbal Cabrera, who played for the 2014 Washington Nationals and had recently been released by the Texas Rangers, to bolster the bench. Reliever Kyle Barraclough, who was assigned to the Senators after struggling to a 6.66 ERA with the Nationals, was designated for assignment. While Cabrera wasn't a factor in the win, grounding into a double play in his only plate appearance of the game, the Nationals downed the Giants 5–3 behind starting pitcher Aníbal Sánchez and a three-hit night for catcher Kurt Suzuki, who drove in Washington's first three runs of the game on a first-inning single and a third-inning home run deep to left. Ross continued his return to form in the series finale, shutting out the Giants through six innings. Parra, whom the Giants had cut loose from a major league deal earlier in the season, hit a huge three-run home run to power Washington's offense in the 4–1 win.

Heading to Citi Field for their first series against the division-rival New York Mets since the Mets' four-game sweep in late May, the Nationals picked up right where they left off, dropping the first two of three games thanks to bullpen blowups much like the ones that doomed them in their last go-round in Queens. On August 9, a resurgent Strasburg set a new franchise high in strikeouts (Note: The previous franchise record-holder was Steve Rogers, who recorded 1,621 strikeouts over 13 seasons with the Montreal Expos, from the 1973 season into the 1985 season. (See Reddington, Patrick, "Stephen Strasburg sets franchise strikeout record in solid start in Nationals’ 7–6 loss to Mets in Citi Field...", Federal Baseball, August 10, 2019)) but ended up with a no-decision after closer Sean Doolittle blew a three-run lead on a Todd Frazier home run in the ninth inning, then right fielder Adam Eaton missed a Michael Conforto line drive that fell in for a walk-off single. Despite 20-year-old left fielder Juan Soto delivering the fourth multi-homer game of his young career, homering twice for the first time in the 2019 season, and Corbin going toe-to-toe with Mets starter Noah Syndergaard, on August 10, it was veteran setup man Fernando Rodney's time to blow the save, giving up a home run to pinch-hitter Luis Guillorme—the first of his career—in the eighth inning to tie the game. Rodney shouldered the loss as he combined with the freshly acquired Hudson to give the Mets the lead, as Hudson surrendered a sacrifice fly by J. D. Davis that brought home an inherited runner. With second place in the division, first place in the wild card standings, and an eight-game winning streak for New York on the line, the Nationals salvaged the series with a 7–4 victory on August 11, with the big blows being delivered against the Mets bullpen by the second baseman Cabrera, who doubled in two runs against his former team, and center fielder Victor Robles, who came in as a defensive substitute and hammered a two-run home run off Edwin Díaz. Doolittle closed out the game for his first save of the season at Citi Field. Robles came into the game as a replacement for Soto, who injured his ankle rounding third base on Cabrera's go-ahead double. To the Nationals' relief, the injury was diagnosed after the game as a mild ankle sprain, keeping Soto off the injured list. In other positive injury news, the Nationals activated Kendrick the next day, optioning Stevenson back to Double-A Harrisburg.

Even with Soto sitting out as a precaution, the Nationals offense had its way with Anthony DeSclafani and the Cincinnati Reds as they opened a series at Nationals Park on August 12. DeSclafani was chased from the game after four innings as the Nationals bashed him for six runs on their way to a 7–6 win. Starting for Washington, Fedde gave up a home run to Jesse Winker to lead off the game, but he settled in after Robles threw out Joey Votto at home as he tried to score on a base hit by Josh VanMeter. The throw was clocked at 99.5 miles per hour (160.1 km/h) on a line to catcher Kurt Suzuki. While Doolittle recorded the save, the Reds scored two off the struggling Nationals closer, on a home run by Phillip Ervin and a double by Votto, and put the go-ahead runner on base before VanMeter popped out to end it. While Martinez expressed confidence in Doolittle after the game, Doolittle admitted to reporters that he was fatigued. The Nationals rolled on in a lower-scoring affair on August 13, winning 3–1. Returning to game action just two days after rolling his ankle, Soto crushed a fastball into the second deck in left field off Reds starter Alex Wood for his 25th home run of the season. Ross extended his scoreless streak to 17 innings, a season high for a Nationals pitcher, before allowing the Reds' only run of the night in the seventh inning. Inserted to work out of an eighth-inning jam, Hudson ended up collecting a four-out save, his first save as a National since being acquired from the Toronto Blue Jays. The next afternoon, it was Guerra who notched his first Nationals save, also since coming from the Blue Jays earlier in the season. However, Guerra's save came under very different circumstances, as he gave up three runs—enough to blow a conventional one-inning save opportunity—but pitched the last three innings of a game the Nationals won by ten runs. (Note: It was Guerra's second save of the season, both coming under the three-inning rule. The other save came in a 10–2 Blue Jays win against the Chicago White Sox. (See "Blue Jays' Javy Guerra: Picks up three-inning save", CBS Sports, May 18, 2019, and Fendrich, Howard, "Reds belted by Nationals who complete sweep, but Aquino homers again", local12.com, August 14, 2019)) With a ten-run fifth inning, the first inning in Nationals team history in which every member of the starting lineup scored at least one run, the Nationals stunned Reds ace Trevor Bauer, who was charged with a career-high nine earned runs, one of which was driven in by Strasburg.

Coming off their three-game sweep of the Reds, the Nationals nearly matched the feat against the Milwaukee Brewers. After winning a 2–1 series opener behind Corbin on August 16, the Nationals rallied from a five-run deficit and led by three heading into the ninth inning in the second game of the series. However, Doolittle surrendered a leadoff home run to defending National League MVP Christian Yelich, followed by a two-run homer by Brewers third baseman Mike Moustakas and a solo home run by Ryan Braun. Robles, who also threw out two baserunners at second base during the fourteen-inning affair, was twice responsible for a blown Milwaukee save, singling in a run off Brewers closer Josh Hader to tie the game in the bottom of the ninth before Hader struck out the side with the bases loaded to send the game into extra innings, then later hitting a sacrifice fly off Junior Guerra in the bottom of the thirteenth after the Brewers scored in the top of the inning. Javy Guerra allowed a two-run home run to Eric Thames in the top of the fourteenth inning, and while the Nationals got one back as Eaton scored on an errant throw by second baseman Keston Hiura in the bottom of the fourteenth, Junior Guerra was able to close out the 15–14 Brewers win by striking out Ross, who was inserted to pinch-hit for Javy Guerra. The Nationals placed Doolittle on the injured list with right knee tendinitis on August 18 and recalled right-hander Kyle McGowin from Double-A Harrisburg. In the series finale, the Nationals bounced back to win 16–8, tying a team record for home runs with eight, (Note: Brook, Zach (August 18, 2019). "Nationals tie club record with stunning home run barrage vs. Brewers". NBC Sports Washington. Archived from the original on August 19, 2019. That record was set by the Nationals on July 27, 2017, also against the Milwaukee Brewers.) including two by Soto in his second two-homer game of the season. (Note: Soto became the third major league player to hit at least 50 home runs before his 21st birthday, joining Mel Ott and Tony Conigliaro. (See Bancroft, Bobby, "Nationals match team HR record with 8, rout Brewers 16–8", The Washington Post, August 18, 2019)) Fedde gave up four runs of his own through five innings but was credited with the win. McGowin gave up four more runs in the ninth inning before sealing the win. Dozier also had a two-homer game for the Nationals, hitting the Nationals' final home run of the day off Hernán Pérez, normally a position player, whom Milwaukee manager Craig Counsell inserted to pitch the eighth inning.

Nationals hitting remained hot as the team went to PNC Park to start a four-game series against the Pittsburgh Pirates. Although they lost Dozier to the three-day paternity list as he welcomed a new child, with Adrián Sánchez recalled to take his place, Washington shut out Pittsburgh 13–0 on August 19. Ross exited in the fourth inning after being struck by a comebacker on the leg. Guerra pitched 3 2/3 perfect innings to pick up the win in relief. Although Strasburg supplied seven scoreless innings on August 20, the Pirates shocked the Nationals with a four-run eighth inning against Suero and Hudson, winning 4–1. Corbin kept the Nationals' strong starting pitching going as he led an 11–1 win on August 21 with eight scoreless innings. With ace Max Scherzer returning from a shoulder injury, Dozier coming back from paternity leave, and McGowin and Adrián Sánchez optioned in a corresponding move, Washington won the series, again holding the Pirates to one run, with a 7–1 win on August 22. Scherzer only pitched four innings, making him ineligible for the win, saying later that while he felt well enough to play, he was "not out of the woods yet" following the injury.

The Midwest roadtrip continued at Wrigley Field, where the Nationals swept the Chicago Cubs over three games. Despite playing in a day game after a night game and travel, the Nationals came out swinging, beating the Cubs 9–3 on August 23 behind Aníbal Sánchez, who carried a complete-game shutout bid into the ninth inning for his longest outing of the year. Like Scherzer two days earlier, Ross was shakier than usual in his first game after his leg injury on August 24, but the Nationals won as Suero stranded two runners inherited from Ross in the fifth inning and the bullpen shut Chicago out the rest of the way. Strasburg was in line for the win after two-out hits by Soto and Cabrera put the Nationals up by three runs in the seventh inning in the series finale, but the bullpen couldn't hold the lead, with the Cubs tying the game on home runs off Strickland and Rodney. Washington rallied against Tyler Chatwood in the top of the eleventh inning, and Hudson closed out the win, pitching two perfect innings. Strickland left the team immediately after the Cubs series for the birth of his second daughter, Brylee Drew, and was replaced temporarily by catcher Spencer Kieboom, whom the Nationals recalled from Double-A Harrisburg while Strickland was on the paternity list.

Despite coming in hot as they returned home to face the Baltimore Orioles, one of the worst-performing teams in the American League, in interleague play, the Nationals were stunned in a shutout on August 27. Corbin gave up the only two runs of the game in the first inning, and the Washington offense was unable to rally against Orioles starter Aaron Brooks or their worst-in-the-majors bullpen. Rallying from the unexpected loss, the Nationals defeated the Orioles for a series split on August 28. Scherzer again struggled as his pitch count climbed and didn't make it out of the fifth inning, although he passed the 200-strikeout threshold for the season in the win. (Note: Scherzer took lone command of second place with eight consecutive 200-strikeout seasons, second only to Tom Seaver's nine. (See Ginsburg, David, "Scherzer goes over 200 Ks as Nationals beat Orioles 8–4", ABC Sports, August 28, 2019)) The Nationals offense powered up early, though, scoring five runs off of Baltimore starter Asher Wojciechowski in the first inning and tacking on three more against Richard Bleier in the fifth, enough to win 8–4. Although shortstop Trea Turner reached base on an error during the game, his career-best on-base streak officially ended at 33 games. Eaton exited the game after being hit near his right knee by a Wojciechowski fastball, prompting Martinez to hold him out of the lineup for the next series against the Miami Marlins. Kieboom was optioned after the two-game series without having made an appearance.

With both Strickland and Elías activated to start the series, and struggling left-handed reliever Matt Grace designated for assignment to clear roster space, the Nationals rolled over the Marlins in the three-game set, finishing August on a three-game winning streak after splitting with the Orioles and taking the first two games against their Miami division rivals. Although the bullpen couldn't hold a win for Aníbal Sánchez in the series opener on August 30—Strickland loaded the bases and gave up a run before recording an out in the seventh inning, and both Elías and Hudson were tagged with blown saves—the Nationals rallied after a two-run Starlin Castro home run briefly put Miami on top in the ninth inning. Rendon, who took the lead for the National League batting title with three hits in the contest, singled home Kendrick and Turner to walk off the Marlins; he was showered with chants of "M-V-P" from the home crowd as the team celebrated on the field. The Nationals shut out the Marlins the next day behind eight strong innings from Strasburg, who didn't allow a baserunner after the first inning and struck out 14 Marlins to pull into the lead for strikeouts in the National League. The game also featured back-to-back home runs by Rendon and Soto, who both reached 30 home runs for the season with their solo shots to left. (Note: The home runs made Rendon and Soto only the second-ever pair of Nationals, after Adam Dunn and Ryan Zimmerman for the 2009 Washington Nationals, to both have at least 30 home runs in a season, and the first pair of teammates to both reach the 30-home-run milestone on back-to-back home runs in major league history. Soto also became the seventh player in major league history to hit at least 30 home runs in a season before turning 21. (See Collier, Jamal, "Rendon, Soto make history on back-to-back HRs", MLB.com, September 1, 2019))

August saw the Nationals post their best win–loss record of the season to date, at 19–7. They finished the month with a 76–58 record, good for first place in the National League Wild Card race and second in the National League East Division, 5.5 games back of the Atlanta Braves.

=== September ===
With rosters expanding, the Nationals activated a slew of veterans from the injured list: first baseman Ryan Zimmerman and pitchers Sean Doolittle, Jeremy Hellickson, and Austin Voth, all of whom had completed rehab assignments in the minor leagues the previous month. The team also recalled catcher Raudy Read from the Triple-A Fresno Grizzlies, along with infielder Adrián Sánchez and outfielder Andrew Stevenson from the Double-A Harrisburg Senators, giving them an active roster of 32. On September 1, the Nationals completed their three-game sweep of the division-rival Miami Marlins, with Zimmerman contributing a two-run home run in the win behind left-hander Patrick Corbin. Corbin became the third Nationals starting pitcher, behind Stephen Strasburg and Max Scherzer, to pass the 200-strikeout threshold for the season. (Note: The Nationals became the second team in National League history, after the 1969 Houston Astros with Larry Dierker, Tom Griffin, and Don Wilson, to have three pitchers with 200 or more strikeouts in the same season. (See Anderson, R.J., "Patrick Corbin becomes third Nationals starter to hit 200 strikeouts as Washington records historic feat", CBS Sports, September 1, 2019))

The Nationals endured a difficult stretch against two more division rivals, the New York Mets and the Atlanta Braves. Joe Ross started the series opener against New York on September 2, but still showing signs of discomfort after exiting early in his previous start with an injury, Ross allowed seven runs and didn't make it out of the fourth inning. Noah Syndergaard kept the Nationals off the board for seven innings, and despite a three-run home run in the ninth inning by former Met Asdrúbal Cabrera, the Mets won easily. The second game in the series was trending the same way, especially after left-handed reliever Roenis Elías gave up two home runs to left-handed batters, then after shortstop Trea Turner appeared to forget the number of outs, throwing to first base instead of second on a routine double play ball with one out in the top of the ninth inning, and reliever Daniel Hudson proceeded to give up four more runs as the inning continued. But with the Mets leading 10-4, the Nationals put together a rally against Mets relievers Paul Sewald, Luis Avilán, and Edwin Díaz in the bottom of the ninth. Center fielder Víctor Robles singled and then scored on a Turner double to the wall. Cabrera, Anthony Rendon, and Juan Soto singled. Zimmerman, pinch-hitting against Díaz, doubled over the head of right fielder Michael Conforto to make the score 10-8 and bring up catcher Kurt Suzuki as the potential winning run. Suzuki worked the count full against Díaz and then unloaded on a 100 miles per hour (160 km/h) fastball, pulling it into deep left field for a walk-off three-run home run. It was the largest ninth-inning comeback by any team in the 2019 Major League Baseball season. (Note: Major league teams leading by six runs in the ninth inning were undefeated to that point in the season. The last time a team had given up five or more runs in the top of the ninth inning and then scored more runs to walk off in the bottom of the ninth was the Boston Red Sox over the Washington Senators on June 18, 1961. (See Homler, Ryan, "This ridiculous stat puts the Nationals’ unprecedented comeback vs. Mets in context", NBC Sports Washington, September 4, 2019, and Allen, Scott, "The seven best reactions to Nats’ insane walk-off win over the Mets", The Washington Post, September 4, 2019)) After the big comeback win, however, the Nationals struggled. On September 4, they selected the contract of right-handed reliever Aaron Barrett—a former major league staple with the Nationals in the 2014 and 2015 seasons before his career was derailed by injury, who had spent the season as the closer for Double-A Harrisburg. But that day, they dropped the rubber game in the three-game series to New York. Starter Aníbal Sánchez was dealt his first loss in nearly four months, giving up seven runs in five innings. The Nationals lost 12 of 19 head-to head matchups with the Mets in 2019, by far their worst record against any team.

The loss stretched into a losing streak in Atlanta, as Max Fried, Dallas Keuchel, and Julio Teherán smothered the Nationals' offense over three consecutive starts and Washington was unable to come all the way back against the Braves bullpen. Ross was scratched from his scheduled start opposite Teherán with a forearm strain, and Voth was tabbed to fill in. Barrett pitched for the first time in a major league game since August 5, 2015, as he provided a scoreless inning of relief with one walk and one strikeout behind Voth on September 7. Later that game, Soto achieved his first 100-RBI season as he doubled home a pair of runs in the eighth inning. (Note: Soto became the sixth player in major league history with at least 100 RBIs in his age-20 season, and the first since Alex Rodriguez for the Seattle Mariners in 1996. (See Mayo, Quinton, "Washington Nationals Roundup: Juan Soto becomes 6th player 20 or younger to hit century mark", NBC Sports Washington, September 7, 2019, and Harris, Blake, "TBLA Sunday morning links: September 8, 2019", True Blue LA, September 8, 2019)) With Suzuki experiencing pain in his throwing arm, the Nationals purchased the contract of Harrisburg catcher Tres Barrera on September 8, bringing him up to the major leagues for the first time. Minor league catcher Spencer Kieboom was placed on the 60-day injured list to clear a spot for Barrera on the team roster. The Nationals rebounded behind Scherzer in the series finale that day, scoring nine times to beat the Braves and salvage the series. Scherzer singled, stole a base, and scored one of the Nationals' runs in the critical seventh inning.

At Target Field for a three-game interleague series against the Minnesota Twins, the Nationals' offense went silent as José Berríos led the Twins to a shutout win on September 10. Aníbal Sánchez took a no-hit bid into the fifth inning but was collared with the loss after Twins catcher Mitch Garver slugged a two-run home run against him. However, the visitors rebounded to take the second and third games of the set. On September 11, the Nationals jumped all over Twins starter Martín Pérez, scoring five runs over the first three innings, including two on a Zimmerman home run, en route to a 6–2 victory. In the series finale on September 12, the Twins' Kyle Gibson made his first start since coming off the injured list and was hit hard, giving up six runs before being hooked in the fifth inning. Inserted to protect a huge lead in the eighth inning, in just his second game with the Nationals since his return, Barrett struggled badly, giving up a two-run home run to Jonathan Schoop and exiting with just one out and two runners on base. Veteran reliever Fernando Rodney entered and, after walking the bases loaded, worked out of the jam with no further damage. The Nationals won 12–6, getting extra insurance in the ninth on a Yan Gomes two-run homer.

Returning to Nationals Park for a short homestand against the Braves on September 13, the Nationals were again shut out for the second straight series opener, as Soroka avenged his previous loss and the Braves pinned the loss on Scherzer in the rematch. Scherzer wasn't as sharp as he was six days earlier, giving up three runs in five innings of work. Washington's offense fared little better the next day against Mike Foltynewicz, who gave up an early run on a Rendon double but stifled the Nationals the rest of the way. Voth pitched effectively for five innings, holding the one-run lead, but he bequeathed a runner to Wander Suero in the sixth inning, and after Atlanta cashed in that run on back-to-back singles off Suero, the bullpen fully collapsed in the seventh inning. Rodney came on after Suero issued two walks, and as Charlie Culberson squared to bunt, Rodney's first pitch—a 91 miles per hour (146 km/h) two-seam fastball—ran in on the right-handed batter and struck him just below the eye, causing multiple fractures to his cheekbone. Culberson managed to flash a thumbs-up to the crowd as he was carted off the field. Atlanta manager Brian Snitker began shouting and was ejected from the game after the umpires ruled that the play was not a hit-by-pitch but a strike, because Culberson had squared around to bunt and hadn't pulled back his bat at the time he was hit by Rodney's fastball. While that at-bat concluded, with Adam Duvall standing in for Culberson as a pinch-hitter, with a strikeout, Rodney gave up four runs thereafter in the inning, two of them charged to Suero. The Braves went on to win 10–1, padding their lead against long reliever Erick Fedde in the later innings. Barrera made his major league debut as a pinch-hitter in the ninth inning, lining out to the pitcher in his sole plate appearance, one day before his 25th birthday. The Nationals rebounded to salvage the series finale on September 15, benefiting from a pristine start by Aníbal Sánchez and scoreless relief innings by Hunter Strickland and Doolittle, as well as an offensive resurgence that sent Fried to a third-inning exit and a loss. First baseman Howie Kendrick contributed with a standout effort, including a two-run single in the third inning and a home run in the fifth inning. During the game, however, Nationals manager Dave Martinez was taken ill and went to the hospital, leaving bench coach Chip Hale to fill in as acting manager.

Inconsistency on offense continued to plague the Nationals as they began their final roadtrip of the regular season. As the wild card race in the National League continued to tighten, the Nationals dropped two of three against the St. Louis Cardinals. Key cogs in the previous game, Doolittle and Strickland combined to give up the go-ahead runs in a 4–2 loss on September 16, with a runner Doolittle bequeathed to Strickland scoring on a ground-rule double by Marcell Ozuna. Washington rebounded with a win on September 17 behind Corbin, who avenged himself against St. Louis after a rocky start early in the season, and Kendrick, who finished a double shy of the cycle. Hudson locked down a two-inning save. The bats again went quiet, though, as veteran starter Adam Wainwright led the Cardinals to a series win on September 18, outdueling Scherzer, who gave up five runs in the loss—the last two on a pinch-hit home run by former Nationals batterymate Matt Wieters.

The Nationals headed for another series against the Marlins in Miami up 1½ games over the Chicago Cubs and Milwaukee Brewers for the first wild card. With Martinez returning to the Nationals dugout, Washington won the first two games, overcoming a rough start by Sánchez and a shaky relief outing by Suero to win 6–4 on September 20 and then putting up a huge top of the tenth inning to win an extra-innings contest, 10–4, on September 21. In the latter game, Rodney blew a four-run lead in the eighth inning, with a bases-clearing Austin Dean double tying the game, before Suero posted a scoreless ninth inning and the Nationals reeled off six runs, capped by a bases-clearing double of their own—in Suzuki's first plate appearance since suffering an arm injury two weeks prior—to win in the tenth. However, the visitors were unable to make it a sweep as they couldn't rally after yet another bullpen collapse, in which Strickland, Suero, and Tanner Rainey combined to turn in a two-run lead into a two-run deficit in the seventh inning, in the series finale on September 22.

With a disappointing three weeks just as the Brewers were enjoying a winning run, as they began their last homestand of the year, the Nationals had whiled away an advantage that once stood at 7½ games into a virtual tie with Milwaukee atop the wild card race. But the Nationals were done losing in September. They opened an unusual five-game homestand with the division-rival Philadelphia Phillies with a 7–2 rout behind Corbin on September 23, then swept both ends of a split doubleheader on September 24, with Hudson saving both contests. By winning the first game, in which Ross made his first start since his seven-run disaster against the Mets on September 2, the Nationals eliminated the Phillies from playoff contention. That evening, the Nationals were trailing by two runs in the sixth inning before Turner came up to bat with the bases loaded against Phillies reliever Jared Hughes. Turner hit a grand slam into the stands behind the visitors' bullpen in left field to put the Nationals on top. The bullpen held on for the 6–5 win, although Strickland allowed a solo home run to former National Bryce Harper in a grudge matchup in the seventh inning. With their win in the nightcap, followed just minutes later by the Cubs' loss—shown on the Nationals Park jumbotron, with most of the home team lingering on the field to watch—the Nationals formally clinched a wild card, sending them back to the postseason for the first time since the 2017 season. Sánchez rebounded from his rocky previous start to lead the Nationals to a 5–2 win on September 25, with September-callup infielder Wilmer Difo singling in the winning run in the seventh inning in his first start since returning to the major leagues. The Nationals sealed the sweep with a 6–3 win on September 26, with Strasburg earning the win in his last start of the regular season. It was the Nationals' first sweep of a five-game series in franchise history.

The Cleveland Indians, who came to Washington to end the season with three games of interleague competition, ran into the Nationals buzzsaw as they were swept, with Nationals outfielder Gerardo Parra emerging from a lengthy slump to particularly bedevil Cleveland as he tallied 11 RBIs in the series. In his final start of the season on September 27, Voth got the win with six strong innings against the Indians. The Nationals scored five runs in the sixth inning to salt the game away, with Cabrera pinch-hitting for Voth and driving in two with a double. By losing the game, the Indians were eliminated from playoff contention for the first time since the 2015 season. Washington quickly jumped out ahead on September 28 with a nine-run second inning, punctuated by a Parra grand slam to straightaway center. The big inning gave the Nationals enough room to work around one of Corbin's worst starts of the year, as the southpaw was chased from the mound in the fifth inning after allowing six earned runs in his last start of the regular season. The Nationals won 10–7, ensuring home field advantage in the Wild Card Game. They completed the season with an easy 8–2 win on September 29, stealing four bases off the battery of starter Mike Clevinger and catcher Kevin Plawecki as Ross outdueled the Cleveland ace in his last start of the season. Barrett allowed one run in an inning of relief as he made his first pitching appearance at Nationals Park since August 2015.

The Nationals went 17–11 in September to finish the 2019 regular season with a 93–69 record, four games behind the National League East Division champion Atlanta Braves but with a wild card into the playoffs for the first time in franchise history. Rendon, the Nationals' starting third baseman, led the major leagues in runs batted in with 126; Strasburg led the National League in wins with 18; and the rookie center fielder Robles led the major leagues in outs above average with 21, as determined by Statcast.

=== Notable transactions ===
- April 15: The Nationals signed left-handed relief pitcher Dan Jennings to a minor-league contract.
- April 26: The Nationals selected the contract of infielder Carter Kieboom from the Triple-A Fresno Grizzlies.
- April 30: The Nationals selected the contract of left-handed relief pitcher Dan Jennings from the Double-A Harrisburg Senators and designated right-handed relief pitcher Austin L. Adams for assignment.
- May 2: The Nationals fired pitching coach Derek Lilliquist and announced his replacement by Nationals minor-league pitching coordinator Paul Menhart.
- May 4: The Nationals traded relief pitcher Austin L. Adams to the Seattle Mariners for minor-league left-handed pitcher Nick Wells and cash considerations.
- May 9: The Nationals signed outfielder Gerardo Parra to a one-year deal and designated pitcher Jimmy Cordero for assignment.
- May 11: The Nationals purchased the contract of right-handed pitcher Michael Blazek from the Lincoln Saltdogs and signed him to a minor-league contract.
- May 15: The Nationals lost pitcher Jimmy Cordero to the Toronto Blue Jays on a waiver claim.
- May 20: The Nationals acquired right-handed relief pitcher Javy Guerra from the Toronto Blue Jays on a waiver claim and designated left-handed relief pitcher Dan Jennings for assignment. Jennings elected free agency.
- May 21: The Nationals purchased the contract of right-handed pitcher Kevin McGowan from the Sugar Land Skeeters and signed him to a minor-league contract.
- May 25: The Nationals purchased the contract of right-handed pitcher George Kontos from the Long Island Ducks and signed him to a minor-league contract.
- May 29: The Nationals signed left-handed pitcher Jonny Venters to a minor-league contract.
- June 2: The Nationals signed pitcher Fernando Rodney to a minor-league contract.
- June 23: The Nationals released relief pitcher Trevor Rosenthal.
- June 25: The Nationals selected the contracts of relief pitchers Fernando Rodney from the Triple-A Fresno Grizzlies and Jonny Venters from the Double-A Harrisburg Senators.
- July 12: The Nationals signed pitcher Brad Boxberger to a minor-league contract.
- July 22: The Nationals selected the contract of relief pitcher Michael Blazek from the Triple-A Fresno Grizzlies.
- July 29: The Nationals designated right-handed relief pitcher Justin Miller for assignment. He was outrighted to the Triple-A Fresno Grizzlies.
- July 31: The Nationals acquired left-handed relief pitcher Roenis Elías and right-handed relief pitcher Hunter Strickland from the Seattle Mariners for minor league pitchers Elvis Alvarado, Aaron Fletcher, and Taylor Guilbeau, acquired right-handed relief pitcher Daniel Hudson from the Toronto Blue Jays for minor league pitcher Kyle Johnston, and designated right-handed relief pitchers Michael Blazek and Javy Guerra for assignment; Blazek and Guerra were outrighted to the Triple-A Fresno Grizzlies.
- August 2: The Nationals designated left-handed relief pitcher Tony Sipp for assignment. He elected free agency.
- August 4: The Nationals selected the contract of right-handed relief pitcher Javy Guerra from the Triple-A Fresno Grizzlies and purchased the contract of infielder T. J. Rivera from the Long Island Ducks and signed him to a minor-league contract.
- August 6: The Nationals signed infielder Asdrúbal Cabrera to a major-league contract and designated relief pitcher Kyle Barraclough for assignment.
- August 9: The Nationals lost relief pitcher Kyle Barraclough to the San Francisco Giants on a waiver claim.
- August 13: The Nationals signed right-handed relief pitcher Greg Holland to a minor-league contract.
- August 21: The Nationals signed left-handed relief pitcher Sam Freeman to a minor-league contract.
- August 23: The Nationals signed right-handed relief pitcher Jake Buchanan to a minor-league contract.
- August 27: The Nationals signed right-handed relief pitcher Josh Lucas to a minor-league contract.
- August 30: The Nationals designated left-handed pitcher Matt Grace for assignment; he was outrighted to the Triple-A Fresno Grizzlies.
- September 4: The Nationals selected the contract of right-handed relief pitcher Aaron Barrett from the Double-A Harrisburg Senators.
- September 8: The Nationals selected the contract of catcher Tres Barrera from the Double-A Harrisburg Senators.

=== Major league debuts ===
- March 30: Jake Noll
- April 26: Carter Kieboom
- May 26: James Bourque
- September 14: Tres Barrera

=== Broadcasters ===
In mid-September 2018, Ray Knight, who had served as the studio analyst on the Mid-Atlantic Sports Network′s (MASN) pre-game and post-game Nats Xtra shows on the Mid-Atlantic Sports Network (MASN) since the 2007 season, was pulled from broadcasts after a verbal altercation with a staff member at MASN; he did not return to the air during the 2018 season, and his 2019 contract option was not picked up. In December 2018, Johnny Holliday, the host of Nats Xtra during the same years, announced that he would not return to MASN in 2019.

On January 25, 2019, the Nationals and MASN announced their broadcasting lineup for 2019 following the departures of Knight and Holliday, with Dan Kolko – the Nationals′ field reporter from 2014 through 2018 – replacing Holliday as Nats Extra host and Bo Porter – the Nationals′ third-base coach in 2011 and 2012 – taking over from Knight as Nats Xtra studio analyst. They also announced that Alex Chappell – who under her maiden name, Alex Corddry, had covered college football on ESPN and the SEC Network since 2016 and had been the Tampa Bay Rays field reporter during the 2017 season – would replace Kolko as Nationals field reporter in 2019.

From August 31 to September 3, former Nationals outfielder Justin Maxwell made his debut as a broadcaster, serving as a substitute studio analyst on the pre-game and post-game Nats Xtra shows on MASN.

=== Culture and entertainment ===
==== Cabbage Smash Kids ====
On February 17, during spring training, third base coach Bob Henley, in order to inspire Nationals players, gathered players who had reported to spring training – mostly pitchers at the time – and informed them that it was both National Cabbage Day and National Random Acts of Kindness Day. He produced a head of cabbage and spoke in praise of it, noting that it is very versatile and always sticks together. He then divided the players into two teams and pitted them against one another in a relay race that required them to pass a head of cabbage to the next runner, at the end of which the final runner threw the cabbage to the clubhouse floor at FITTEAM Ballpark of the Palm Beaches, smashing it. On April 9, after a 10–6 win over the Philadelphia Phillies in extra innings, the Nationals held the relay race and smashing of cabbages for the first time in the regular season, with the hitters involved for the first time. Within hours, two companies had begun to sell "Cabbage Smash Kids" – a play on the Cabbage Patch Kids brand name – T-shirts. The relay race and cabbage-smashing became a private, chemistry-building ritual for the team after big victories, with players sworn to reveal few details about it to the press.

==== "Baby Shark" ====
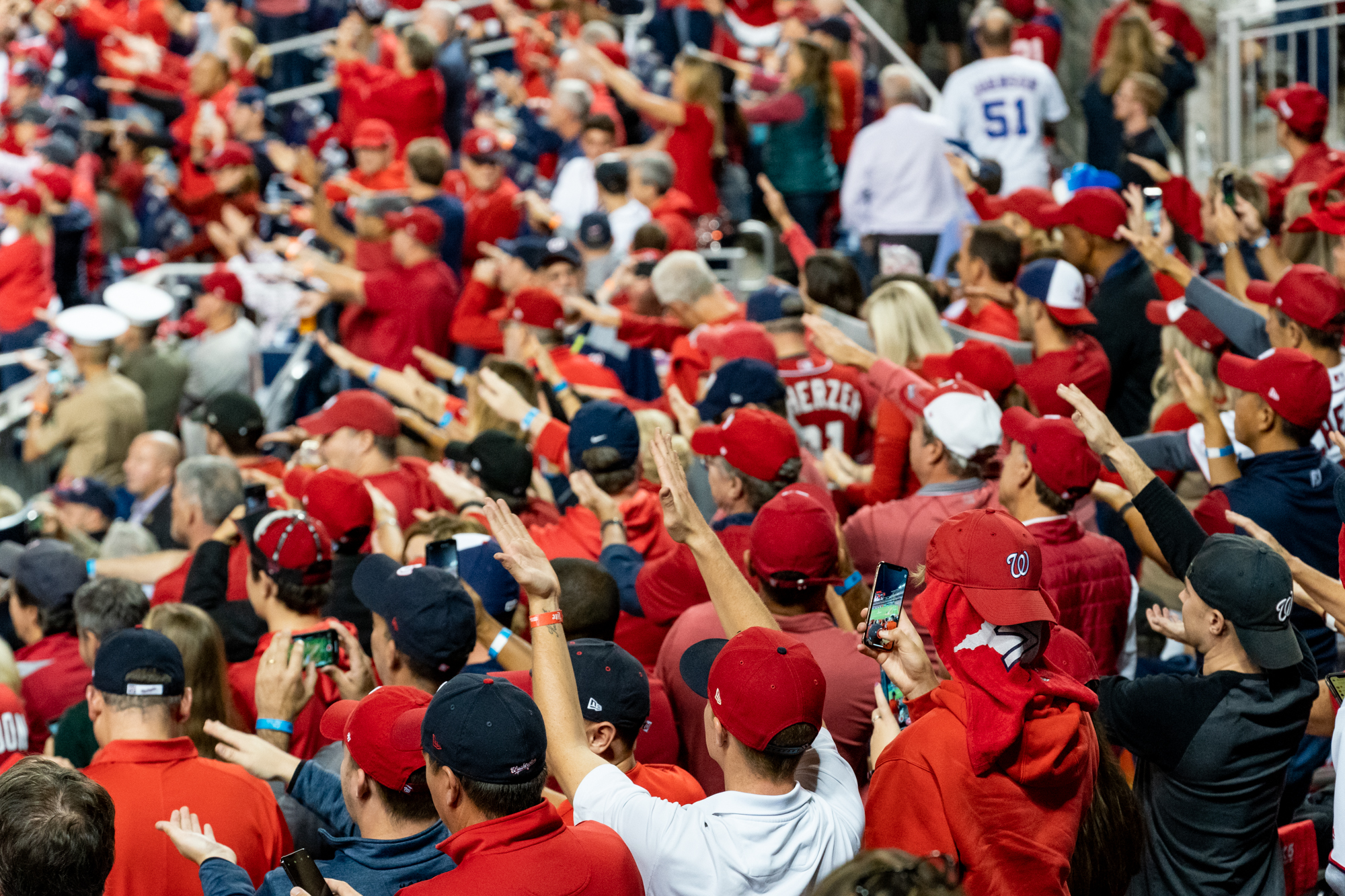
Fan clapping their arms together as "daddy shark"

Reserve outfielder Gerardo Parra, signed by the Nationals to a major league deal in May, changed his walkup music on June 19 in an attempt to break out of a batting slump. Parra opted for Pinkfong's "Baby Shark", a children's song that was a favorite of his 2-year-old daughter Aaliyah. After hitting a home run on his first day walking up to "Baby Shark", Parra decided to stick with the children's song. Although not an everyday player for the Nationals, Parra's walkup routine became an event at Nationals Park, with thousands of fans snapping their arms like the jaws of a shark in time with the music, as well as in the dugout, with Nationals players clapping their forefinger and thumb together as "baby shark" to celebrate a single, their hands together as "mommy shark" for a double, and their arms together as "daddy shark" for a triple or home run. On July 23, the Nationals added a jumbotron animation showing three Parra figures clapping along with the song to accentuate his walkup music. Parra and several other Nationals players also introduced a home run tradition in the dugout, forming a human tunnel and clapping in time as the home run hitter ran down the tunnel and performed a short impromptu dance routine. Local and national sports media picked up on Parra's contributions to clubhouse chemistry and a positive atmosphere at Nationals Park after the team's early-season struggles, with NBC Sports describing "Baby Shark" as "a rallying call" for the Nationals.

==== "Calma" ====
After clinching the Wild Card, during locker room celebrations, the Latino players started singing "Calma" by Pedro Capó. This was furthered by Brian Dozier going shirtless during the celebrations, something he would continue to do after winning the Wild Card, NLDS, NLCS, and World Series. He would also end up doing it at the parade, yelling into the microphone, "My wife's gonna kill me."

=== Attendance ===
The Nationals drew 2,259,781 fans at Nationals Park during 2019, their tenth-highest attendance since arriving in Washington in 2005 and lowest since 2011. It placed them twelfth in attendance for the season among the 15 National League teams, down from eighth in 2018. It was the second consecutive season in which their attendance had dropped from the previous year. Their highest attendance at a home game occurred on March 28, when they drew an Opening Day crowd of 42,263 for a game against the New York Mets, while the low mark was 14,628 for the first game of a split doubleheader against the Colorado Rockies on July 24. Their average home attendance was 27,899 per game, tenth-highest since their arrival in Washington.

=== Game log ===
Legend
	Nationals win
	Nationals loss
	Postponement
**Bold**	Nationals team member

2019 game log: 93–69 (Home: 50–31; Away: 43–38)
March: 1–2 (Home: 1–2; Away: 0–0)

#	Date	Opponent	Score	Win	Loss	Save	Attendance	Record
1	March 28	Mets	0–2	deGrom (1–0)	**Scherzer** (0–1)	Díaz (1)	42,263	0–1
2	March 30	Mets	8–11	Wilson (1–0)	**Rosenthal** (0–1)	Díaz (2)	33,765	0–2
3	March 31	Mets	6–5	**Doolittle** (1–0)	Wilson (1–1)	—	23,430	1–2

April: 11–14 (Home: 5–8; Away: 6–6)

#	Date	Opponent	Score	Win	Loss	Save	Attendance	Record
4	April 2	Phillies	2–8	Eflin (1–0)	**Scherzer** (0–2)	—	35,920	1–3
5	April 3	Phillies	9–8	**Doolittle** (2–0)	Robertson (0–1)	—	20,050	2–3
6	April 4	@ Mets	4–0	**Strasburg** (1–0)	Syndergaard (0–1)	—	44,424	3–3
7	April 6	@ Mets	5–6	Familia (2–0)	**Sipp** (0–1)	Díaz (4)	35,156	3–4
8	April 7	@ Mets	12–9	**Scherzer** (1–2)	Wheeler (0–1)	—	40,681	4–4
9	April 8	@ Phillies	3–4	Domínguez (1–0)	**Sánchez** (0–1)	Neshek (1)	28,212	4–5
10	April 9	@ Phillies	10–6 (10)	**Doolittle** (3–0)	Álvarez (0–1)	—	38,073	5–5
11	April 10	@ Phillies	15–1	**Hellickson** (1–0)	Pivetta (1–1)	—	30,805	6–5
12	April 12	Pirates	3–6 (10)	Burdi (1–1)	**Grace** (0–1)	Vázquez (4)	27,084	6–6
13	April 13	Pirates	3–2	**Suero** (1–0)	Rodríguez (0–1)	**Doolittle** (1)	32,103	7–6
14	April 14	Pirates	3–4	Vázquez (1–0)	**Suero** (1–1)	—	22,347	7–7
15	April 16	Giants	3–7	Rodríguez (2–2)	**Strasburg** (1–1)	—	22,334	7–8
16	April 17	Giants	9–6	**Hellickson** (2–0)	Samardzija (1–1)	—	22,611	8–8
17	April 18	Giants	4–2	**Corbin** (1–0)	Pomeranz (0–2)	**Doolittle** (2)	26,085	9–8
18	April 19	@ Marlins	2–3	Smith (2–0)	**Sánchez** (0–2)	Romo (2)	8,199	9–9
19	April 20	@ Marlins	3–9	Ureña (1–3)	**Scherzer** (1–3)	—	9,910	9–10
20	April 21	@ Marlins	5–0	**Strasburg** (2–1)	Richards (0–3)	—	7,412	10–10
21	April 22	@ Rockies	5–7	Oh (1–0)	**Suero** (1–2)	Davis (2)	20,517	10–11
22	April 23	@ Rockies	6–3	**Corbin** (2–0)	Hoffman (0–1)	**Doolittle** (3)	24,456	11–11
23	April 24	@ Rockies	5–9	Márquez (3–1)	**Sánchez** (0–3)	Davis (3)	33,135	11–12
24	April 26	Padres	3–4	Stammen (3–1)	**Doolittle** (3–1)	Yates (13)	27,193	11–13
25	April 27	Padres	3–8 (10)	Perdomo (1–0)	**Suero** (1–3)	—	35,422	11–14
26	April 28	Padres	7–6 (11)	**Miller** (1–0)	Wisler (1–1)	—	30,186	12–14
27	April 29	Cardinals	3–6	Wacha (2–0)	**Corbin** (2–1)	Hicks (9)	17,890	12–15
28	April 30	Cardinals	2–3	Wainwright (3–2)	**Sánchez** (0–4)	Miller (1)	19,753	12–16

May: 12–17 (Home: 7–5; Away: 5–12)

#	Date	Opponent	Score	Win	Loss	Save	Attendance	Record
29	May 1	Cardinals	1–5	Mikolas (3–2)	**Scherzer** (1–4)	—	22,157	12–17
30	May 2	Cardinals	2–1	**Strasburg** (3–1)	Hudson (2–2)	**Doolittle** (4)	24,338	13–17
31	May 3	@ Phillies	2–4	Domínguez (3–0)	**Jennings** (0–1)	Neris (5)	33,125	13–18
32	May 4	@ Phillies	10–8	**Sipp** (1–1)	Morgan (1–1)	**Doolittle** (5)	43,319	14–18
33	May 5	@ Phillies	1–7	Eflin (4–3)	**Sánchez** (0–5)	—	40,497	14–19
34	May 6	@ Brewers	3–5	Claudio (1–1)	**Jennings** (0–2)	Guerra (2)	29,299	14–20
35	May 7	@ Brewers	0–6	Peralta (2–1)	**Strasburg** (3–2)	—	31,023	14–21
36	May 8	@ Brewers	3–7	Woodruff (5–1)	**Hellickson** (2–1)	Hader (10)	30,333	14–22
37	May 9	@ Dodgers	6–0	**Corbin** (3–1)	Hill (0–1)	—	42,851	15–22
38	May 10	@ Dodgers	0–5	Maeda (4–2)	**Sánchez** (0–6)	Urías (2)	43,533	15–23
39	May 11	@ Dodgers	5–2	**Scherzer** (2–4)	Báez (2–2)	**Doolittle** (6)	53,647	16–23
40	May 12	@ Dodgers	0–6	Ryu (5–1)	**Strasburg** (3–3)	—	45,667	16–24
41	May 14	Mets	2–6	Syndergaard (3–3)	**Hellickson** (2–2)	—	23,315	16–25
42	May 15	Mets	5–1	**Corbin** (4–1)	Font (1–1)	—	29,673	17–25
43	May 16	Mets	7–6	**Jennings** (1–2)	Wheeler (3–3)	**Doolittle** (7)	28,807	18–25
44	May 17	Cubs	6–14	Hamels (4–0)	**Scherzer** (2–5)	—	33,296	18–26
45	May 18	Cubs	5–2	**Strasburg** (4–3)	Lester (3–2)	**Doolittle** (8)	37,582	19–26
46	May 19	Cubs	5–6	Hendricks (4–4)	**Hellickson** (2–3)	Cishek (4)	23,244	19–27
47	May 20	@ Mets	3–5	Gagnon (2–0)	**Corbin** (4–2)	Díaz (11)	22,335	19–28
48	May 21	@ Mets	5–6	Díaz (1–2)	**Rainey** (0–1)	—	24,631	19–29
49	May 22	@ Mets	1–6	Gagnon (3–0)	**Barraclough** (0–1)	—	27,188	19–30
50	May 23	@ Mets	4–6	Gsellman (1–0)	**Suero** (1–4)	Díaz (12)	29,962	19–31
51	May 24	Marlins	12–10	**Barraclough** (1–1)	Anderson (1–2)	**Doolittle** (9)	29,173	20–31
52	May 25	Marlins	5–0	**Corbin** (5–2)	Alcántara (2–5)	—	33,163	21–31
53	May 26	Marlins	9–6	**Fedde** (1–0)	Smith (3–2)	—	26,365	22–31
54	May 27	Marlins	2–3	Ureña (3–6)	**Barraclough** (1–2)	Romo (10)	21,048	22–32
55	May 28	@ Braves	5–4	**Strasburg** (5–3)	Fried (7–3)	**Doolittle** (10)	27,573	23–32
56	May 29	@ Braves	14–4	**Sánchez** (1–6)	Gausman (2–4)	**McGowin** (1)	37,726	24–32
57	May 31	@ Reds	3–9	Mahle (2–5)	**Corbin** (5–3)	—	24,358	24–33

June: 18–8 (Home: 8–4; Away: 10–4)

#	Date	Opponent	Score	Win	Loss	Save	Attendance	Record
58	June 1	@ Reds	5–2	**Rainey** (1–1)	Roark (4–4)	**Doolittle** (11)	27,748	25–33
59	June 2	@ Reds	4–1	**Scherzer** (3–5)	Gray (2–5)	**Doolittle** (12)	22,801	26–33
60	June 4	White Sox	9–5	**Strasburg** (6–3)	López (3–6)	**Doolittle** (13)	32,513	27–33
61	June 5	White Sox	6–4	**Doolittle** (4–1)	Colomé (2–1)	—	28,910	28–33
62	June 6	@ Padres	4–5	Lucchesi (5–3)	**Corbin** (5–4)	Yates (23)	19,908	28–34
63	June 7	@ Padres	4–5	Warren (4–1)	**Doolittle** (4–2)	—	21,645	28–35
64	June 8	@ Padres	4–1	**Scherzer** (4–5)	Lauer (5–5)	**Doolittle** (14)	30,219	29–35
65	June 9	@ Padres	5–2	**Strasburg** (7–3)	Stammen (4–3)	—	30,518	30–35
66	June 10	@ White Sox	12–1	**Sánchez** (2–6)	Despaigne (0–1)	—	16,305	31–35
67	June 11	@ White Sox	5–7	Marshall (1–0)	**Corbin** (5–5)	Colomé (14)	16,790	31–36
68	June 13	Diamondbacks	0–5	Greinke (8–2)	**Fedde** (1–1)	—	24,909	31–37
69	June 14	Diamondbacks	7–3	**Scherzer** (5–5)	Ray (5–4)	—	29,853	32–37
70	June 15	Diamondbacks	3–10	Hirano (3–3)	**Strasburg** (7–4)	—	38,044	32–38
71	June 16	Diamondbacks	15–5	**Sánchez** (3–6)	Bradley (2–4)	—	29,032	33–38
–	June 17	Phillies	Postponed (rain); Rescheduled for June 19 as part of a doubleheader.					
–	June 18	Phillies	Postponed (rain); Rescheduled for September 24 as part of a doubleheader.					
72	June 19 (1)	Phillies	6–2	**Corbin** (6–5)	Eflin (6–7)	—	17,961	34–38
73	June 19 (2)	Phillies	2–0	**Scherzer** (6–5)	Arrieta (6–6)	**Doolittle** (15)	24,220	35–38
74	June 20	Phillies	7–4	**Guerra** (1–0)	Pivetta (4–2)	**Doolittle** (16)	31,329	36–38
75	June 21	Braves	4–3	**Strasburg** (8–4)	Keuchel (0–1)	**Suero** (1)	34,212	37–38
76	June 22	Braves	9–13	Minter (1–4)	**Ross** (0–1)	—	37,492	37–39
77	June 23	Braves	3–4 (10)	Minter (2–4)	**Rainey** (1–2)	Jackson (11)	34,256	37–40
78	June 25	@ Marlins	6–1	**Scherzer** (7–5)	Richards (3–8)	—	7,327	38–40
79	June 26	@ Marlins	7–5	**Corbin** (7–5)	Gallen (0–1)	**Doolittle** (17)	6,276	39–40
80	June 27	@ Marlins	8–5	**Strasburg** (9–4)	Alcántara (4–7)	—	7,751	40–40
81	June 28	@ Tigers	3–1	**Sánchez** (4–6)	Norris (2–7)	**Rodney** (1)	20,877	41–40
82	June 29	@ Tigers	5–7	Alcántara (3–1)	**Rainey** (1–3)	Greene (22)	27,716	41–41
83	June 30	@ Tigers	2–1	**Scherzer** (8–5)	Jiménez (2–6)	**Doolittle** (18)	21,052	42–41

July: 15–10 (Home: 10–6; Away: 5–4)

#	Date	Opponent	Score	Win	Loss	Save	Attendance	Record
84	July 2	Marlins	3–2	**Doolittle** (5–2)	Quijada (0–2)	—	21,362	43–41
85	July 3	Marlins	3–1	**Strasburg** (10–4)	Alcántara (4–8)	**Doolittle** (19)	25,483	44–41
86	July 4	Marlins	5–2	**Sánchez** (5–6)	Hernández (1–3)	**Rodney** (2)	27,350	45–41
87	July 5	Royals	4–7 (11)	Flynn (2–0)	**Venters** (0–1)	Peralta (2)	25,213	45–42
88	July 6	Royals	6–0	**Scherzer** (9–5)	Sparkman (2–5)	—	27,863	46–42
89	July 7	Royals	5–2	**Doolittle** (6–2)	Diekman (0–6)	—	21,873	47–42
**All–Star Break (July 8–11)**
90	July 12	@ Phillies	4–0	**Strasburg** (11–4)	Pivetta (4–4)	—	42,318	48–42
91	July 13	@ Phillies	4–3	**Suero** (2–4)	Neris (1–4)	**Doolittle** (20)	43,732	49–42
92	July 14	@ Phillies	3–4	Neris (2–4)	**Grace** (0–2)	—	43,075	49–43
93	July 16	@ Orioles	8–1	**Voth** (1–0)	Wojciechowski (0–3)	—	23,362	50–43
94	July 17	@ Orioles	2–9	Ynoa (1–6)	**Suero** (2–5)	Givens (8)	20,786	50–44
95	July 18	@ Braves	13–4	**Strasburg** (12–4)	Wright (0–3)	—	39,363	51–44
96	July 19	@ Braves	3–4	Jackson (5–2)	**Rodney** (0–3)	—	39,344	51–45
97	July 20	@ Braves	5–3	**Sánchez** (6–6)	Soroka (10–2)	**Doolittle** (21)	42,467	52–45
98	July 21	@ Braves	1–7	Gausman (3–5)	**Ross** (0–2)	—	31,848	52–46
–	July 22	Rockies	Postponed (inclement weather); Rescheduled for July 24 as part of a doubleheader.					
99	July 23	Rockies	11–1	**Strasburg** (13–4)	Lambert (2–2)	—	22,612	53–46
100	July 24 (1)	Rockies	3–2	**Suero** (3–5)	Estévez (1–1)	**Doolittle** (22)	14,628	54–46
101	July 24 (2)	Rockies	2–0	**Corbin** (8–5)	Freeland (2–8)	**Doolittle** (23)	23,843	55–46
102	July 25	Rockies	7–8	Díaz (3–2)	**Rodney** (0–4)	Davis (15)	26,831	55–47
103	July 26	Dodgers	2–4	Kelly (4–3)	**Sipp** (1–2)	Jansen (25)	37,491	55–48
104	July 27	Dodgers	3–9	Kershaw (9–2)	**Ross** (0–3)	—	39,616	55–49
105	July 28	Dodgers	11–4	**Strasburg** (14–4)	Buehler (9–2)	—	32,425	56–49
106	July 29	Braves	6–3	**Corbin** (9–5)	Keuchel (3–4)	—	24,292	57–49
107	July 30	Braves	8–11	Teherán (6–7)	**Fedde** (1–2)	—	26,566	57–50
108	July 31	Braves	4–5 (10)	Newcomb (5–1)	**Doolittle** (6–3)	Tomlin (2)	31,576	57–51

August: 19–7 (Home: 8–2; Away: 11–5)

#	Date	Opponent	Score	Win	Loss	Save	Attendance	Record
109	August 2	@ Diamondbacks	3–0	**Ross** (1–3)	Young (4–1)	**Doolittle** (24)	24,298	58–51
110	August 3	@ Diamondbacks	7–18	Ray (10–7)	**Strasburg** (14–5)	—	33,966	58–52
111	August 4	@ Diamondbacks	5–7	Hirano (4–5)	**Suero** (3–6)	Bradley (2)	22,976	58–53
112	August 5	@ Giants	4–0	**Fedde** (2–2)	Samardzija (8–9)	—	32,366	59–53
113	August 6	@ Giants	5–3	**Sánchez** (7–6)	Menez (0–1)	**Doolittle** (25)	31,628	60–53
114	August 7	@ Giants	4–1	**Ross** (2–3)	Anderson (3–4)	—	30,958	61–53
115	August 9	@ Mets	6–7	Avilán (3–0)	**Doolittle** (6–4)	—	39,602	61–54
116	August 10	@ Mets	3–4	Lugo (5–2)	**Rodney** (0–5)	—	43,875	61–55
117	August 11	@ Mets	7–4	**Grace** (1–2)	Gsellman (2–3)	**Doolittle** (26)	41,000	62–55
118	August 12	Reds	7–6	**Fedde** (3–2)	DeSclafani (7–7)	**Doolittle** (27)	22,394	63–55
119	August 13	Reds	3–1	**Ross** (3–3)	Wood (1–1)	**Hudson** (3)	30,130	64–55
120	August 14	Reds	17–7	**Strasburg** (15–5)	Bauer (10–9)	**Guerra** (2)	23,596	65–55
121	August 16	Brewers	2–1	**Strickland** (1–1)	Guerra (6–4)	**Doolittle** (28)	30,091	66–55
122	August 17	Brewers	14–15 (14)	Guerra (7–4)	**Guerra** (1–1)	—	36,953	66–56
123	August 18	Brewers	16–8	**Fedde** (4–2)	Anderson (5–3)	—	30,571	67–56
124	August 19	@ Pirates	13–0	**Guerra** (2–1)	Williams (5–6)	—	11,284	68–56
125	August 20	@ Pirates	1–4	Vázquez (3–1)	**Suero** (3–7)	—	10,449	68–57
126	August 21	@ Pirates	11–1	**Corbin** (10–5)	Musgrove (8–12)	—	10,577	69–57
127	August 22	@ Pirates	7–1	**Strickland** (2–1)	Brault (3–3)	—	10,587	70–57
128	August 23	@ Cubs	9–3	**Sánchez** (8–6)	Lester (10–9)	—	39,889	71–57
129	August 24	@ Cubs	7–2	**Suero** (4–7)	Quintana (11–9)	—	41,159	72–57
130	August 25	@ Cubs	7–5 (11)	**Hudson** (7–3)	Chatwood (5–2)	—	40,518	73–57
131	August 27	Orioles	0–2	Brooks (4–7)	**Corbin** (10–6)	Givens (11)	24,946	73–58
132	August 28	Orioles	8–4	**Suero** (5–7)	Wojciechowski (2–7)	—	25,174	74–58
133	August 30	Marlins	7–6	**Hudson** (8–3)	Stanek (0–4)	—	26,201	75–58
134	August 31	Marlins	7–0	**Strasburg** (16–5)	López (5–7)	—	27,539	76–58

September: 17–11 (Home: 11–4; Away: 6–7)

#	Date	Opponent	Score	Win	Loss	Save	Attendance	Record
135	September 1	Marlins	9–3	**Corbin** (11–6)	Smith (8–9)	—	29,345	77–58
136	September 2	Mets	3–7	Syndergaard (10–7)	**Ross** (3–4)	—	25,329	77–59
137	September 3	Mets	11–10	**Guerra** (3–1)	Díaz (1–7)	—	20,759	78–59
138	September 4	Mets	4–8	Wheeler (10–7)	**Sánchez** (8–7)	—	20,237	78–60
139	September 5	@ Braves	2–4	Fried (16–4)	**Strasburg** (16–6)	—	28,831	78–61
140	September 6	@ Braves	3–4	Keuchel (7–5)	**Corbin** (11–7)	Greene (23)	37,181	78–62
141	September 7	@ Braves	4–5	Teherán (10–8)	**Voth** (1–1)	Melancon (10)	40,467	78–63
142	September 8	@ Braves	9–4	**Scherzer** (10–5)	Soroka (11–4)	—	31,789	79–63
143	September 10	@ Twins	0–5	Berríos (12–8)	**Sánchez** (8–8)	—	24,813	79–64
144	September 11	@ Twins	6–2	**Strasburg** (17–6)	Pérez (10–7)	—	20,062	80–64
145	September 12	@ Twins	12–6	**Corbin** (12–7)	Gibson (13–7)	—	19,167	81–64
146	September 13	Braves	0–5	Soroka (12–4)	**Scherzer** (10–6)	—	39,730	81–65
147	September 14	Braves	1–10	Foltynewicz (7–5)	**Suero** (5–8)	—	39,664	81–66
148	September 15	Braves	7–0	**Sánchez** (9–8)	Fried (16–6)	—	29,350	82–66
149	September 16	@ Cardinals	2–4	Hudson (16–7)	**Doolittle** (6–5)	Martínez (20)	42,812	82–67
150	September 17	@ Cardinals	6–2	**Corbin** (13–7)	Mikolas (9–14)	**Hudson** (4)	44,061	83–67
151	September 18	@ Cardinals	1–5	Wainwright (13–9)	**Scherzer** (10–7)	Martínez (21)	37,669	83–68
152	September 20	@ Marlins	6–4	**Sánchez** (10–8)	Dugger (0–3)	**Hudson** (5)	12,775	84–68
153	September 21	@ Marlins	10–4 (10)	**Suero** (6–8)	Ureña (4–10)	—	18,085	85–68
154	September 22	@ Marlins	3–5	García (4–2)	**Suero** (6–9)	Brigham (1)	19,709	85–69
155	September 23	Phillies	7–2	**Corbin** (14–7)	Eflin (9–13)	—	19,788	86–69
156	September 24 (1)	Phillies	4–1	**Rainey** (2–3)	Vincent (1–4)	**Hudson** (6)	23,442	87–69
157	September 24 (2)	Phillies	6–5	**Scherzer** (11–7)	Nola (12–7)	**Hudson** (7)	22,214	88–69
158	September 25	Phillies	5–2	**Sánchez** (11–8)	Morin (1–3)	**Doolittle** (29)	22,091	89–69
159	September 26	Phillies	6–3	**Strasburg** (18–6)	Vargas (7–9)	**Hudson** (8)	22,253	90–69
160	September 27	Indians	8–2	**Voth** (2–1)	Goody (3–2)	—	27,434	91–69
161	September 28	Indians	10–7	**Corbin** (15–7)	Plutko (7–5)	—	38,435	92–69
162	September 29	Indians	8–2	**Ross** (4–4)	Clevinger (13–4)	—	36,764	93–69

== Roster ==
2019 Washington Nationals
Roster
Pitchers: 70 Austin L. Adams; 20 Kyle Barraclough; 32 Aaron Barrett; 52 Michael Blazek; 64 James Bourque; 46,45 Patrick Corbin; 63 Sean Doolittle; 29 Roenis Elías; 23 Erick Fedde; 33 Matt Grace; 48 Javy Guerra; 58 Jeremy Hellickson; 44 Daniel Hudson; 26 Dan Jennings; 61 Kyle McGowin; 60 Justin Miller; 21 Tanner Rainey; 56 Fernando Rodney; 44 Trevor Rosenthal; 41 Joe Ross; 19 Aníbal Sánchez; 31 Max Scherzer; 36 Tony Sipp; 37 Stephen Strasburg; 60 Hunter Strickland; 51 Wander Suero; 39 Jonny Venters; 50 Austin Voth; 53 Austen Williams	Catchers: 73 Tres Barrera; 10 Yan Gomes; 65 Raudy Read; 28 Kurt Suzuki; Infielders: 15 Matt Adams; 1 Wilmer Difo; 9 Brian Dozier; 13,14 Asdrúbal Cabrera; 47 Howie Kendrick; 8 Carter Kieboom; 18 Jake Noll; 6 Anthony Rendon; 5 Adrián Sánchez; 7 Trea Turner; 11 Ryan Zimmerman	Outfielders: 2 Adam Eaton; 88 Gerardo Parra; 16 Víctor Robles; 22 Juan Soto; 17 Andrew Stevenson; 3 Michael A. Taylor	Manager: 4 Dave Martinez; Coaches: 35 Henry Blanco (Bullpen); 24 Tim Bogar (First Base); 25 Joe Dillon (Assistant Hitting); 12 Chip Hale (Bench); 13 Bob Henley (Third Base); 38 Derek Lilliquist (Pitching) (Fired on May 2, 2019); 54 Kevin Long (Hitting); 55 Paul Menhart (Pitching) (Hired on May 2, 2019)

== Statistics ==
=== Regular season ===
==== Team leaders ====
Qualifying players only.

===== Batting =====
Stat	Player	Total
Avg.	Anthony Rendon	.319
HR	Anthony Rendon; Juan Soto	34
RBI	Anthony Rendon	126
R	Anthony Rendon	117
H	Anthony Rendon	174
SB	Trea Turner	35

===== Pitching =====
Stat	Player	Total
W	Stephen Strasburg	18
L	Wander Suero	9
ERA	Max Scherzer	2.92
SO	Stephen Strasburg	251
SV	Sean Doolittle	29
IP	Stephen Strasburg	209.0

==== Batting ====
Note: Pos = Position; G = Games played; AB = At bats; R = Runs scored; H = Hits; 2B = Doubles; 3B = Triples; HR = Home runs; RBI = Runs batted in; AVG = Batting average; SB = Stolen bases

Complete offensive statistics are available here.

Pos	Player	G	AB	R	H	2B	3B	HR	RBI	AVG	SB
C	Yan Gomes	97	314	36	70	16	0	12	43	.223	2
1B	Matt Adams	111	310	42	70	14	0	20	56	.226	0
2B	Brian Dozier	135	416	54	99	20	0	20	50	.238	3
SS	Trea Turner	122	521	96	155	37	5	19	57	.298	35
3B	Anthony Rendon	146	545	117	174	44	3	34	126	.319	5
LF	Juan Soto	150	542	110	153	32	5	34	110	.282	12
CF	Victor Robles	155	546	86	139	33	3	17	65	.255	28
RF	Adam Eaton	151	566	103	158	25	7	15	49	.279	15
IF	Howie Kendrick	121	334	61	115	23	1	17	62	.344	2
C	Kurt Suzuki	85	280	37	74	11	0	17	63	.264	0
UT	Gerardo Parra	89	188	30	47	11	1	8	42	.250	6
1B	Ryan Zimmerman	52	171	20	44	9	0	6	27	.257	0
2B	Asdrúbal Cabrera	38	124	24	40	10	1	6	40	.323	0
SS	Wilmer Difo	43	131	15	33	2	0	2	8	.252	0
CF	Michael A. Taylor	53	88	10	22	7	0	1	3	.250	6
SS	Carter Kieboom	11	39	4	5	0	0	2	2	.128	0
LF	Andrew Stevenson	30	30	4	11	1	1	0	0	.367	0
OF	Víctor Robles	21	59	8	17	3	1	3	10	.288	3
UT	Adrián Sánchez	28	31	3	7	0	0	0	1	.226	0
CI	Jake Noll	8	12	1	2	1	0	0	2	.167	0
C	Raudy Read	6	11	0	1	0	0	0	0	.091	0
C	Tres Barrera	2	2	0	0	0	0	0	0	.000	0
P	Stephen Strasburg	33	72	4	12	1	0	1	10	.167	0
P	Patrick Corbin	31	65	3	6	1	0	0	4	.092	0
P	Max Scherzer	28	65	6	10	0	0	0	2	.182	2
P	Aníbal Sánchez	27	52	1	6	0	0	0	1	.115	0
P	Joe Ross	28	19	1	2	0	0	0	0	.105	0
P	Erick Fedde	20	15	1	2	0	0	0	0	.133	0
P	Jeremy Hellickson	9	9	3	1	0	0	0	0	.111	0
P	Austin Voth	7	9	0	1	0	0	0	1	.111	0
P	Javy Guerra	33	3	0	0	0	0	0	0	.000	0
P	Sean Doolittle	61	3	0	0	0	0	0	0	.000	0
P	Kyle McGowin	7	3	1	1	0	0	0	0	.333	0
P	Matt Grace	50	3	0	0	0	0	0	0	.000	0
P	Tanner Rainey	47	1	0	0	0	0	0	0	.000	0
P	Wander Suero	75	1	0	0	0	0	0	0	.000	0
P	Roenis Elías	4	1	0	0	0	0	0	0	.000	0
P	Jonny Venters	2	0	0	0	0	0	0	0	–	0
P	Austen L. Adams	1	0	0	0	0	0	0	0	–	0
P	Austen Williams	2	0	0	0	0	0	0	0	–	0
P	Trevor Rosenthal	11	0	0	0	0	0	0	0	–	0
P	Fernando Rodney	35	0	0	0	0	0	0	0	–	0
P	Tony Sipp	33	0	0	0	0	0	0	0	–	0
P	Justin Miller	17	0	0	0	0	0	0	0	–	0
P	Hunter Strickland	23	0	0	0	0	0	0	0	–	0
P	Kyle Barraclough	32	0	0	0	0	0	0	0	–	0
P	Daniel Hudson	23	0	0	0	0	0	0	0	–	0
P	Michael Blazek	4	0	0	0	0	0	0	0	–	0
P	Dan Jennings	8	0	0	0	0	0	0	0	–	0
P	James Bourque	1	0	0	0	0	0	0	0	–	0
P	Aaron Barrett	2	0	0	0	0	0	0	0	–	0
	Team totals	162	5512	873	1460	298	27	231	824	.265	116

==== Pitching ====
Note: Pos = Position; W = Wins; L = Losses; ERA = Earned run average; G = Games pitched; GS = Games started; SV = Saves; IP = Innings pitched; H = Hits allowed; R = Runs allowed; ER = Earned runs allowed; BB = Walks allowed; K = Strikeouts

Complete pitching statistics are available here.

Pos	Player	W	L	ERA	G	GS	SV	IP	H	R	ER	BB	K
SP	Stephen Strasburg	18	6	3.32	33	33	0	209	161	79	77	56	251
SP	Patrick Corbin	14	7	3.25	33	33	0	202	169	81	73	70	238
SP	Max Scherzer	11	7	2.92	27	27	0	172.1	144	59	56	33	243
SP	Aníbal Sánchez	11	8	3.85	30	30	0	166	153	77	71	58	134
SP	Erick Fedde	4	2	4.50	21	12	0	78	81	39	39	33	41
CL	Sean Doolittle	6	5	4.05	63	0	29	60	63	27	27	15	66
RP	Wander Suero	6	9	4.54	78	0	1	71.1	64	36	36	26	81
RP	Javy Guerra	3	1	4.86	40	0	0	53.2	55	30	29	12	42
RP	Tanner Rainey	2	3	3.91	52	0	0	48.1	32	22	21	38	74
RP	Matt Grace	1	2	6.36	51	1	0	46.2	61	34	33	10	35
	Joe Ross	4	4	5.48	27	9	0	64	74	41	39	33	57
	Austin Voth	2	1	3.30	9	8	0	43.2	33	16	16	13	44
	Jeremy Hellickson	2	3	6.23	9	8	0	39	47	31	27	20	30
	Fernando Rodney	0	3	4.05	38	0	2	33.1	29	16	15	16	35
	Kyle Barraclough	1	2	6.66	33	0	0	25.2	33	21	19	12	30
	Daniel Hudson	3	0	1.44	24	0	6	25	18	7	4	4	23
	Tony Sipp	1	2	4.71	36	0	0	21	19	12	11	9	18
	Hunter Strickland	2	0	5.14	24	0	0	21	20	12	12	8	15
	Kyle McGowin	0	0	10.13	7	1	1	16	22	19	18	4	18
	Justin Miller	1	0	4.02	17	0	0	15.2	16	8	7	4	11
	Trevor Rosenthal	0	1	22.74	12	0	0	6.1	8	16	16	15	5
	Michael Blazek	0	0	7.20	4	0	0	5	6	4	4	5	0
	Dan Jennings	1	2	13.50	8	0	0	4.2	8	8	7	7	9
	Jonny Venters	0	1	5.40	3	0	0	3.1	3	3	2	2	5
	Roenis Elías	0	0	9.00	4	0	0	3	5	4	3	1	2
	Aaron Barrett	0	0	15.43	3	0	0	2.1	5	4	4	4	1
	Brian Dozier	0	0	18.00	1	0	0	1	2	2	2	0	0
	Austin L. Adams	0	0	9.00	1	0	0	1	0	1	1	2	2
	James Bourque	0	0	54.00	1	0	0	0.2	3	4	4	2	0
	Austen Williams	0	0	162.00	2	0	0	0.1	5	6	6	1	1
	Gerardo Parra	0	0	inf	1	0	0	0	1	5	5	4	0
	Team totals	93	69	4.27	162	162	40	1439.1	1340	724	683	517	1511

=== Postseason ===
==== Batting ====
(Updated as of 10/30/2019)

Note: G = Games played; AB = At bats; R = Runs; H = Hits; 2B = Doubles; 3B = Triples; HR = Home runs; RBI = Runs batted in; BB = Walks; SO = Strikeouts; Avg. = Batting average; OBP = On base percentage; SLG = Slugging percentage; SB = Stolen bases

Player	G	AB	R	H	2B	3B	HR	RBI	AVG	OBP	SLG	SB
Matt Adams	4	3	1	1	0	0	0	0	.333	.500	.333	0
Asdrúbal Cabrera	10	30	1	7	1	0	0	5	.233	.250	.267	0
Patrick Corbin	6	4	0	0	0	0	0	0	.000	.000	.000	0
Brian Dozier	8	6	0	0	0	0	0	0	.000	.143	.000	0
Adam Eaton	17	61	11	15	2	1	2	10	.246	.361	.410	1
Yan Gomes	11	29	3	7	2	0	0	3	.241	.290	.310	0
Howie Kendrick	17	63	8	18	4	0	2	12	.286	.328	.444	0
Gerardo Parra	7	6	1	1	0	0	0	0	.167	.286	.167	0
Anthony Rendon	17	61	11	20	7	0	3	15	.328	.413	.590	0
Víctor Robles	12	41	8	9	1	1	1	3	.220	.273	.366	1
Joe Ross	2	1	0	0	0	0	0	0	.000	.000	.000	0
Aníbal Sánchez	3	7	0	0	0	0	0	0	.000	.000	.000	0
Max Scherzer	4	6	0	0	0	0	0	0	.000	.000	.000	0
Juan Soto	17	65	12	18	3	0	5	14	.277	.373	.554	1
Stephen Strasburg	4	4	0	0	0	0	0	0	.000	.200	.000	0
Kurt Suzuki	10	30	2	3	0	0	1	4	.100	.229	.200	0
Michael A. Taylor	8	21	4	7	0	0	2	2	.333	.391	.619	0
Trea Turner	17	73	10	17	4	0	1	3	.233	.291	.329	1
Ryan Zimmerman	16	55	5	14	3	0	2	7	.255	.317	.418	0

==== Pitching ====
(Updated as of 10/30/2019)

Note: W = Wins; L = Losses; ERA = Earned run average; G = Games pitched; GS = Games started; SV = Saves; IP = Innings pitched; R = Runs allowed; ER = Earned runs allowed; HR = Home runs allowed; BB = Walks allowed; K = Strikeouts

Player	W	L	ERA	G	GS	SV	IP	H	R	ER	HR	BB	K
Patrick Corbin	2	3	5.79	8	3	0	23.1	21	16	15	2	12	36
Sean Doolittle	0	0	1.74	9	0	2	10.1	6	2	2	1	1	8
Javy Guerra	0	0	3.00	2	0	0	3	6	1	1	1	0	1
Daniel Hudson	1	0	3.72	9	0	4	9.2	11	4	4	1	4	10
Tanner Rainey	0	0	6.75	9	0	0	6.2	3	5	5	1	5	6
Fernando Rodney	0	0	3.86	6	0	0	4.2	4	2	2	1	9	5
Joe Ross	0	1	5.14	2	1	0	7	6	4	4	2	2	1
Aníbal Sánchez	1	1	2.50	3	3	0	18	15	5	5	2	4	18
Max Scherzer	3	0	2.40	6	5	0	30	21	8	8	4	15	37
Stephen Strasburg	5	0	1.98	6	5	0	36.1	30	9	8	4	4	47
Hunter Strickland	0	0	18.00	2	0	0	2	4	4	4	3	1	3
Wander Suero	0	0	4.50	4	0	0	2	2	1	1	1	0	2

== Awards and honors ==
=== All-Stars ===
- Anthony Rendon, 3B
- Max Scherzer, P

On June 30, Anthony Rendon was selected as a reserve third baseman for the National League 2019 Major League Baseball All-Star Game on July 9. It was his first all-star selection, and viewed as long overdue by many Nationals players, staff, and fans as well as media figures who covered the team. At the time of his selection, he was hitting .311 on the season, with a 1.028 slugging percentage, 19 home runs, and 58 RBIs. Over the preceding month, Rendon – known for disliking media attention – had expressed the view that he would prefer to spend the 2019 all-star break at home in Houston, resting and enjoying the company of family and friends out of the spotlight, although after his selection was announced he admitted that it actually meant a great deal to him. However, he also said he might choose not to attend the game because of an undisclosed nagging injury he was playing through. On July 5, the Nationals and Rendon announced that they had made an "organizational decision" that he would not participate in or travel to the All-Star Game so that he could spend the all-star break in the Washington, D.C., area, resting and undergoing treatment for the injury, which they announced as a minor injury to the left quadriceps and hamstring Rendon had first noticed in early June. MLB selected Max Muncy of the Los Angeles Dodgers to take Rendon's place on the all-star roster.

Max Scherzer, who had started for the National League in both the 2017 and 2018 all-star games, also was selected on June 30, the same day he had a win in an eight-inning outing against the Detroit Tigers in which he had given up one run while walking none and striking out 14. At the time of his selection, he had completed a stretch of eight starts in which he pitched 57 innings with an ERA of 0.95, 83 strikeouts, and only eight walks. It was Scherzer's seventh consecutive all-star selection, his seventh overall, and his fifth as a National. On July 6, Scherzer and the Nationals announced that he would attend the all-star game but would not pitch in it due to back tightness. MLB selected Sonny Gray of the Cincinnati Reds to take Scherzer's place on the all-star roster.

=== Regular season awards ===
Anthony Rendon won his second career NL Silver Slugger Award at 3rd base. He hit for a .313/.419/.598 triple slash with a .413 wOBA. He hit 34 home runs and led the league in doubles (44) and RBIs (126). He was named as a finalist for the National League Most Valuable Player Award and finished 3rd in voting.

Patrick Corbin won the Warren Spahn Award, given to the best left-handed pitcher in the league. He had a 3.25 ERA with 238 strikeouts in 202 innings pitched

=== Postseason awards ===
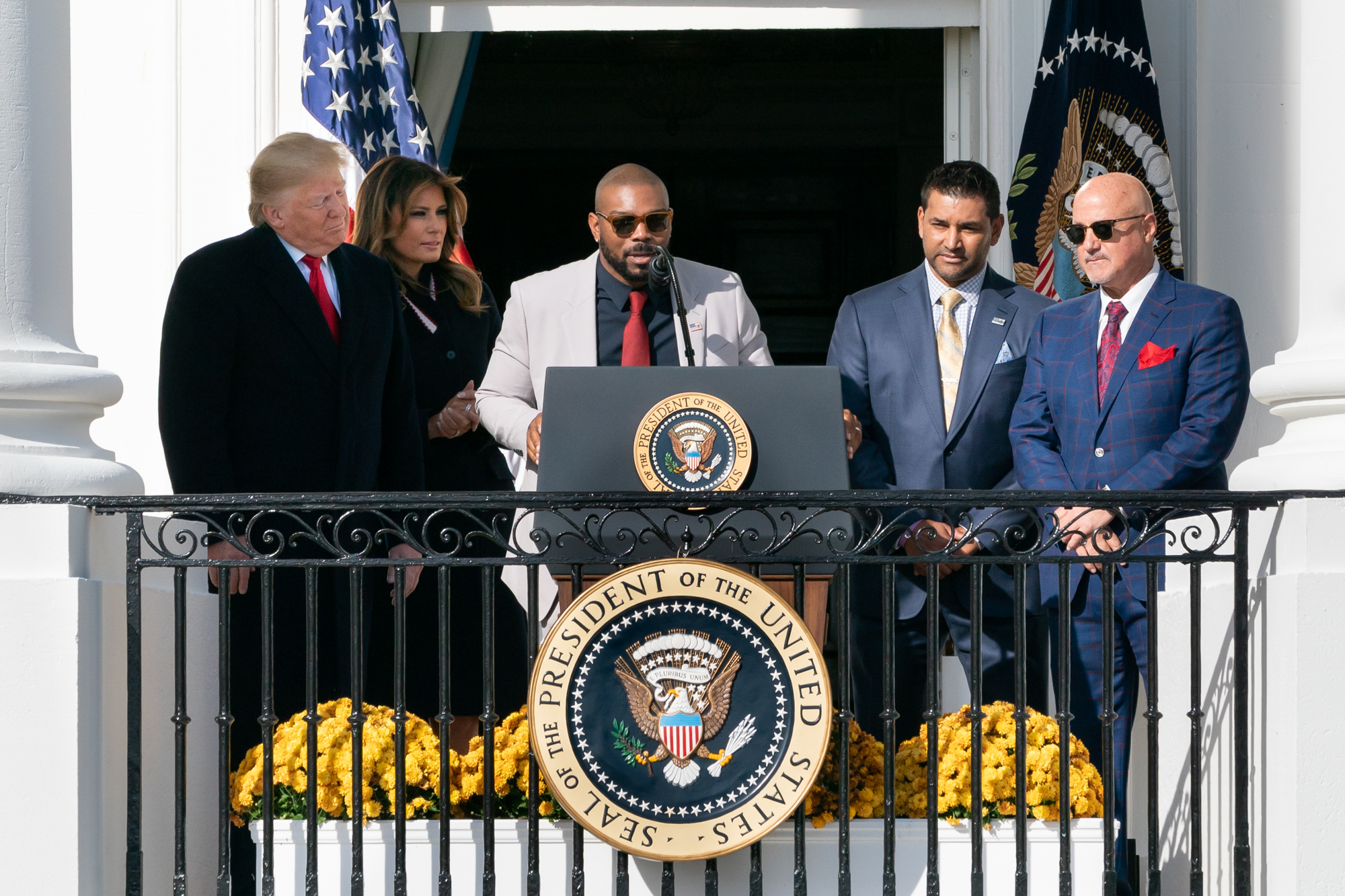
Howie Kendrick delivers remarks from the Blue Room Balcony of the White House during the celebration of the 2019 World Series Champions.

On October 15, Howie Kendrick won the 2019 NLCS Most Valuable Player Award, the first player ever to win a League Championship Series MVP Award in the history of the Montreal-Washington franchise. During the series, he went 5-for-15 (.333) at the plate with four doubles and four RBIs. In Game 3, he went 3-for-4 with three RBIs and became only the fourth player to hit three doubles in a League Championship Series game.

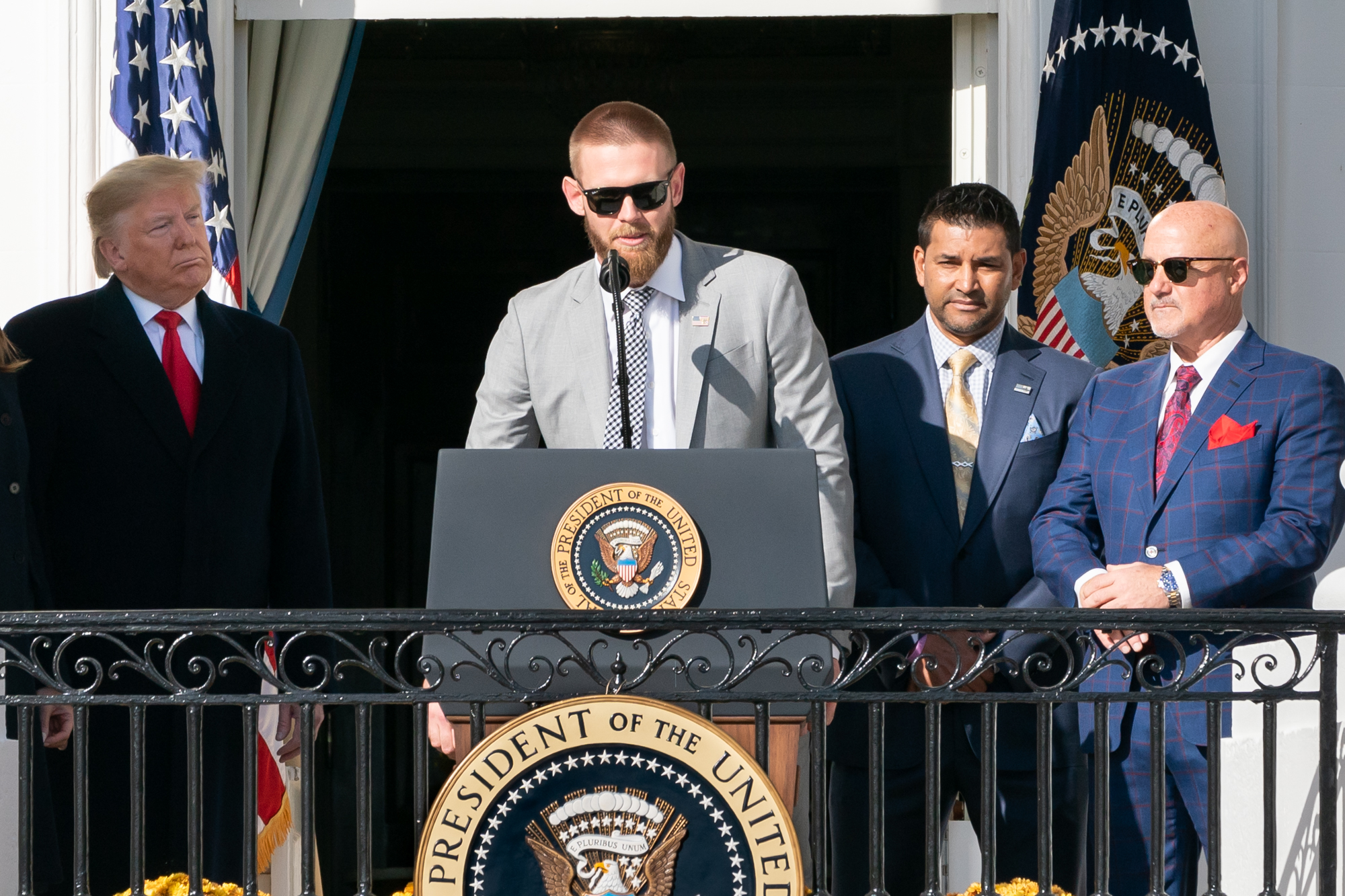
Stephen Strasburg delivers remarks during the 2019 World Series Champion Washington Nationals celebration at the White House on November 4, 2019.

On October 31, Stephen Strasburg won the World Series Most Valuable Player Award, the first player to win it in the history of the franchise. He started Game 2 and Game 6 of the series and allowed just 4 hits and 2 runs in 14.1 innings pitched, while striking out 14 batters en route to being the winning pitcher of record in both games.

On October 2, Juan Soto and Strasburg were named co-winners of the Babe Ruth Award for the best postseason performance. Soto hit for a .277/.373./554 triple slash with 5 homers and 14 RBI, with many big hits such as the game-winning hit in the NL Wild Card Game, game tying home runs in Game 5 of the NLDS and Game 1 of the World Series, and the go-ahead home run in Game 6 of the World Series. Strasburg received the win in 5 of his 6 appearances, while pitching to a 1.98 ERA with 47 strikeouts in 36.1 innings. Thrice he pitched in elimination games. The only game where Strasburg did not receive a win was Game 5 of the NLDS, where he surrendered 3 runs through 6 innings against the Los Angeles Dodgers en route to no decision, as the Nationals stormed back to win in extra-innings. He was the winning pitcher in the NL Wild Card Game out of the bullpen and was also the winning pitcher in Game 6 of the World Series, which forced the winner-take-all Game 7 where the Nationals would go on to win their first championship in franchise history. It was the third time since the award's inception in 1949 where there were two winners of the award, the other times being 2001 (Randy Johnson and Curt Schilling of the Arizona Diamondbacks) and 2017 (Jose Altuve and Justin Verlander of the Houston Astros).

== Farm system ==
Level	Team	League	Manager
AAA	Fresno Grizzlies	Pacific Coast League	Randy Knorr
AA	Harrisburg Senators	Eastern League	Matthew LeCroy
A-Advanced	Potomac Nationals	Carolina League	Tripp Keister
A	Hagerstown Suns	South Atlantic League	Patrick Anderson
A-Short Season	Auburn Doubledays	New York–Penn League	Jerad Head
Rookie	GCL Nationals	Gulf Coast League	Mario Lisson
Rookie	DSL Nationals	Dominican Summer League	Sandy Martínez

=== Triple-A ===
On September 18, 2018, the Nationals and the Fresno Grizzlies of the Pacific Coast League announced that they had struck a two-year player-development deal that made Fresno the Nationals' Triple-A affiliate beginning in the 2019 season.

=== Class A-Advanced ===
In June 2018, Potomac Nationals owner Art Silber announced that he had signed a letter of intent to build a new stadium in Fredericksburg, Virginia, that would open in April 2020. On November 13, 2018, the Fredericksburg city council gave unanimous final approval for the Silber family to finance, build and maintain the new stadium. The 2019 season thus became the 36th and last season for the Potomac Nationals at Pfitzner Stadium in Woodbridge, Virginia, where they had played since 1984; their last game at "the Pfitz" was on August 29. On October 5, the team announced that it had changed its name to the Fredericksburg Nationals for the 2020 season and that its marketing nickname for the team – "P-Nats" when the team was the Potomac Nationals – would change to "FredNats."
