= 2019 Arizona Diamondbacks season =

2019 Arizona Diamondbacks
- League: National League
- Division: West
- Ballpark: Chase Field
- City: Phoenix, Arizona
- Record: 85–77 (.525)
- Divisional place: 2nd
- Owners: Ken Kendrick
- General managers: Mike Hazen
- Managers: Torey Lovullo
- Television: Fox Sports Arizona (Steve Berthiaume, Bob Brenly, Greg Schulte)
- Radio: KMVP-FM (98.7) (Greg Schulte, Tom Candiotti, Mike Ferrin); KHOV-FM (105.1, Spanish)
- Stats: ESPN.com; Baseball Reference

The 2019 Arizona Diamondbacks season was the franchise's 21st season in Major League Baseball and their 21st season at Chase Field in Phoenix, Arizona as members of the National League West. They were managed by Torey Lovullo in his third season with the franchise.

The 2019 Diamondbacks were the first team in Major League history to have their road opener against one reigning pennant winner (Dodgers) and their home opener against the other (Red Sox) in the same season. Despite improving upon their 82–80 record from last season, the Diamondbacks were eliminated from postseason contention for the second consecutive year after a loss to the Cardinals on September 23.

The 2019 Diamondbacks were by one measure the "most average team" in baseball history. For 60 games, the Diamondbacks were within two games of .500 (plus or minus), an MLB record that surpassed a 56-game streak by the 2007 Oakland Athletics. The stretch lasted from June 18, when the Diamondbacks lost to the Colorado Rockies to fall to 38–36, through August 30, when they beat the Los Angeles Dodgers to improve to 69–66.

The Diamondbacks broke a league record alongside the Philadelphia Phillies this season for most home runs in one game, smashing a franchise record 8 home runs out of 13 total in a 13–8 win on June 10. Additionally, the Diamondbacks set a franchise record on September 24/25, when their game against the Cardinals lasted 19 innings, the longest game by innings played in Diamondbacks' history and, at 6 hours and 53 minutes from start to finish, the longest game ever played at Chase Field. Having used 30 players in this game, the Diamondbacks set another franchise record in that respect, and, with 25 strikeouts by Diamondbacks pitchers and 21 by Cardinals pitchers, both teams tied a Major League Baseball record for most strikeouts in a single game at 46, the game also marking only the second time in baseball history that two teams struck out 21 or more opponents in the same game. The Diamondbacks won the game, 3–2. To date, this is the most recent “two for one” 18+ inning game in regular season MLB play.

== Offseason ==
=== Transactions ===
October 31, 2018	Darnell Coles hired as a hitting coach.
October 31, 2018	Eric Hinske was hired as an assistant hitting coach.
December 5, 2018	Traded 1B Paul Goldschmidt to St Louis for RHP Luke Weaver, C Carson Kelly, 2B Andrew Young, and a Compensation Balance Round B pick.
December 30, 2018	Traded Cash Considerations to Cincinnati for LHP Robby Scott.
January 16, 2019	Traded Cash Considerations and LHP Ronald Roman to New York Yankees for CF Tim Locastro.
February 5, 2019	Traded RHP Jake Barrett to San Francisco for Cash Considerations.
April 7, 2019	Traded OF Rob Refsnyder to Cincinnati for a player to be named later.
April 19, 2019	Traded OF Marcus Wilson to Boston for C Blake Swihart and Future Considerations.
June 4, 2019	Traded C Tyler Heineman to Miami for player to be named later.
June 22, 2019	Traded Cash Considerations to Kansas City for RHP Ben Lively.
July 31, 2019	Traded RHP Zack Greinke and Cash Considerations to Houston for RHP Corbin Martin, RHP J. B. Bukauskas, 3B Joshua Rojas, LF Seth Beer.
July 31, 2019	Traded SS Jazz Chisholm Jr. to Miami for RHP Zac Gallen
July 31, 2019	Traded C John Ryan Murphy to Atlanta for Cash Considerations.

== Season standings ==
=== National League West ===
NL West
Team	W	L	Pct.	GB	Home	Road
Los Angeles Dodgers	106	56	.654	—	59‍–‍22	47‍–‍34
Arizona Diamondbacks	85	77	.525	21	44‍–‍37	41‍–‍40
San Francisco Giants	77	85	.475	29	35‍–‍46	42‍–‍39
Colorado Rockies	71	91	.438	35	43‍–‍38	28‍–‍53
San Diego Padres	70	92	.432	36	36‍–‍45	34‍–‍47

=== National League Wild Card ===
Division leaders
Team	W	L	Pct.
Los Angeles Dodgers	106	56	.654
Atlanta Braves	97	65	.599
St. Louis Cardinals	91	71	.562

Wild Card teams (Top 2 teams qualify for postseason)
Team	W	L	Pct.	GB
Washington Nationals	93	69	.574	+4
Milwaukee Brewers	89	73	.549	—
New York Mets	86	76	.531	3
Arizona Diamondbacks	85	77	.525	4
Chicago Cubs	84	78	.519	5
Philadelphia Phillies	81	81	.500	8
San Francisco Giants	77	85	.475	12
Cincinnati Reds	75	87	.463	14
Colorado Rockies	71	91	.438	18
San Diego Padres	70	92	.432	19
Pittsburgh Pirates	69	93	.426	20
Miami Marlins	57	105	.352	32

== Record vs. opponents ==
2019 National League record Source: MLB Standings Grid – 2019
Team	AZ	ATL	CHC	CIN	COL	LAD	MIA	MIL	NYM	PHI	PIT	SD	SF	STL	WSH	AL
Arizona	—	4–3	2–4	3–3	9–10	8–11	3–4	2–5	2–5	4–2	6–1	11–8	10–9	3–3	4–3	14–6
Atlanta	3–4	—	5–2	3–4	3–3	2–4	15–4	3–3	11–8	9–10	5–2	5–2	5–2	4–2	11–8	13–7
Chicago	4–2	2–5	—	8–11	3–3	3–4	6–1	9–10	5–2	2–5	11–8	4–3	4–2	9–10	2–4	12–8
Cincinnati	3–3	4–3	11–8	—	3–3	1–5	6–1	8–11	3–4	3–4	7–12	5–2	4–3	7–12	1–5	9–11
Colorado	10–9	3–3	3–3	3–3	—	4–15	5–2	5–2	2–4	3–4	2–5	11–8	7–12	2–5	3–4	8–12
Los Angeles	11–8	4–2	4–3	5–1	15–4	—	5–1	4–3	5–2	5–2	6–0	13–6	12–7	3–4	4–3	10–10
Miami	4–3	4–15	1–6	1–6	2–5	1–5	—	2–5	6–13	10–9	3–3	4–2	3–3	3–4	4–15	9–11
Milwaukee	5–2	3–3	10–9	11–8	2–5	3–4	5–2	—	5–1	4–3	15–4	3–4	2–4	9–10	4–2	8–12
New York	5–2	8–11	2–5	4–3	4–2	2–5	13–6	1–5	—	7–12	5–1	3–3	3–4	2–5	12–7	15–5
Philadelphia	2–4	10–9	5–2	4–3	4–3	2–5	9–10	3–4	12–7	—	4–2	3–3	3–4	4–2	5–14	11–9
Pittsburgh	1–6	2–5	8–11	12–7	5–2	0–6	3–3	4–15	1–5	2–4	—	6–1	5–2	5–14	3–4	12–8
San Diego	8–11	2–5	3–4	2–5	8–11	6–13	2–4	4–3	3–3	3–3	1–6	—	9–10	4–2	4–3	11–9
San Francisco	9–10	2–5	2–4	3–4	12–7	7–12	3–3	4–2	4–3	4–3	2–5	10–9	—	3–4	1–5	11–9
St. Louis	3–3	2–4	10–9	12–7	5–2	4–3	4–3	10–9	5–2	2–4	14–5	2–4	4–3	—	5–2	9–11
Washington	3–4	8–11	4–2	5–1	4–3	3–4	15–4	2–4	7–12	14–5	4–3	3–4	5–1	2–5	—	14–6

== Game log ==
2019 Game Log 85–77 (Home: 44–37; Away: 41–40)
March/April: 17–13 (Home: 6–7; Away: 11–6)

#	Date	Opponent	Score	Win	Loss	Save	Attendance	Record	Streak
1	March 28	@ Dodgers	5–12	Ryu (1–0)	**Greinke** (0–1)	—	53,086	0–1	L1
2	March 29	@ Dodgers	5–4 (13)	**Andriese** (1–0)	García (0–1)	**Holland** (1)	42,266	1–1	W1
3	March 30	@ Dodgers	5–18	Maeda (1–0)	**Godley** (0–1)	—	50,626	1–2	L1
4	March 31	@ Dodgers	7–8	Floro (1–0)	**Hirano** (0–1)	—	43,815	1–3	L2
5	April 1	@ Padres	10–3	**Kelly** (1–0)	Strahm (0–1)	—	18,683	2–3	W1
6	April 2	@ Padres	8–5	**Greinke** (1–1)	Lauer (1–1)	**Holland** (2)	22,504	3–3	W2
7	April 3	@ Padres	1–4	Lucchesi (2–0)	**Ray** (0–1)	—	19,376	3–4	L1
8	April 5	Red Sox	15–8	**Godley** (1–1)	Porcello (0–2)	—	48,338	4–4	W1
9	April 6	Red Sox	5–4	**Holland** (1–0)	Brewer (0–1)	—	35,969	5–4	W2
10	April 7	Red Sox	0–1	Walden (1–0)	**Kelly** (1–1)	Brasier (2)	31,565	5–5	L1
11	April 9	Rangers	5–4	**Andriese** (2–0)	Leclerc (1–1)	—	16,620	6–5	W1
12	April 10	Rangers	2–5	Lynn (1–1)	**Chafin** (0–1)	Bird (1)	15,871	6–6	L1
13	April 11	Padres	6–7	Stammen (1–0)	**Bradley** (0–1)	Wingenter (1)	15,449	6–7	L2
14	April 12	Padres	1–2	Reyes (1–0)	**Weaver** (0–1)	Yates (8)	22,209	6–8	L3
15	April 13	Padres	4–5	Stammen (2–0)	**Andriese** (2–1)	Yates (9)	27,256	6–9	L4
16	April 14	Padres	8–4	**Greinke** (2–1)	Lauer (2–2)	—	25.489	7–9	W1
17	April 16	@ Braves	9–6	**Hirano** (1–1)	Minter (0–2)	**Holland** (3)	22,407	8–9	W2
18	April 17	@ Braves	3–2	**Bradley** (1–1)	Biddle (0–1)	**Holland** (4)	22,356	9–9	W3
19	April 18	@ Braves	4–1	**Weaver** (1–1)	Soroka (0–1)	**Hirano** (1)	24,193	10–9	W4
20	April 19	@ Cubs	1–5	Hendricks (1–3)	**Kelly** (1–2)	Strop (2)	33,938	10–10	L1
21	April 20	@ Cubs	6–0	**Greinke** (3–1)	Darvish (1–3)	**Clarke** (1)	37,667	11–10	W1
22	April 21	@ Cubs	1–2	Strop (1–1)	**Bradley** (1–2)	—	38,181	11–11	L1
23	April 22	@ Pirates	12–4	**Andriese** (3–1)	Crick (0–1)	—	9,233	12–11	W1
24	April 23	@ Pirates	2–1	**Weaver** (2–1)	Williams (1–1)	**Holland** (5)	8,558	13–11	W2
25	April 24	@ Pirates	11–2	**Kelly** (2–2)	Lyles (2–1)	—	9,450	14–11	W3
26	April 25	@ Pirates	5–0	**Greinke** (4–1)	Taillon (1–3)	—	9,365	15–11	W4
27	April 26	Cubs	8–3	**Ray** (1–1)	Hendricks (1–4)	**Andriese** (1)	30,664	16–11	W5
28	April 27	Cubs	1–9	Darvish (2–3)	**Godley** (1–2)	—	27,793	16–12	L1
29	April 28	Cubs	5–6 (15)	Chatwood (1–0)	**Andriese** (3–2)	Webster (1)	29,477	16–13	L2
30	April 30	Yankees	3–1	**Greinke** (5–1)	Sabathia (1–1)	**Holland** (6)	36,352	17–13	W1

May: 11–17 (Home: 5–7; Away: 6–10)

#	Date	Opponent	Score	Win	Loss	Save	Attendance	Record	Streak
31	May 1	Yankees	3–2	**Kelly** (3–2)	Tanaka (2–3)	**Holland** (7)	31,365	18–13	W2
32	May 3	@ Rockies	10–9	**Ray** (2–1)	Anderson (0–3)	**Holland** (8)	29,574	19–13	W3
33	May 4	@ Rockies	9–2	**Weaver** (3–1)	Freeland (2–5)	—	37,765	20–13	W4
34	May 5	@ Rockies	7–8	Oberg (1–0)	**Bradley** (1–3)	Davis (5)	40,262	20–14	L1
35	May 6	@ Rays	1–12	Snell (3–3)	**Kelly** (3–3)	—	8,124	20–15	L2
36	May 7	@ Rays	3–6	Beeks (2–0)	**Clarke** (0–1)	—	8,059	20–16	L3
37	May 8	@ Rays	3–2 (13)	**Bradley** (2–3)	Kolarek (2–1)	**Godley** (1)	8,663	21–16	W1
38	May 9	Braves	3–2 (10)	**Duplantier** (1–0)	Minter (0–4)	—	17,751	22–16	W2
39	May 10	Braves	1–2	Winkler (1–0)	**López** (0–1)	Jackson (3)	21,932	22–17	L1
40	May 11	Braves	4–6	Gausman (2–3)	**Kelly** (3–4)	Venters (1)	33,168	22–18	L2
41	May 12	Braves	3–5	Fried (5–2)	**Godley** (1–3)	Jackson (4)	27,460	22–19	L3
42	May 13	Pirates	9–3	**Ray** (3–1)	Kingham (1–1)	—	15,418	23–19	W1
43	May 14	Pirates	2–6	Musgrove (2–4)	**Weaver** (3–2)	—	21,047	23–20	L1
44	May 15	Pirates	11–1	**Greinke** (6–1)	Archer (1–3)	—	17,258	24–20	W1
45	May 17	Giants	7–0	**Kelly** (4–4)	Samardzija (2–2)	—	26,806	25–20	W2
46	May 18	Giants	5–8	Bumgarner (3–4)	**Godley** (1–4)	—	25,014	25–21	L1
47	May 19	Giants	2–3 (10)	Dyson (2–0)	**Hirano** (1–2)	Smith (12)	24,061	25–22	L2
48	May 20	@ Padres	1–2	Paddack (4–2)	**Weaver** (3–3)	Yates (18)	17,578	25–23	L3
49	May 21	@ Padres	2–3	Strahm (2-3)	**Greinke** (6-2)	Yates (19)	19,969	25–24	L4
50	May 22	@ Padres	2–5	Lauer (3–4)	**Kelly** (4–5)	Yates (20)	18,715	25-25	L5
51	May 24	@ Giants	18–2	**Ray** (4–1)	Pomeranz (1–5)	**Godley** (2)	31,777	26–25	W1
52	May 25	@ Giants	10–4	**Clarke** (1–1)	Suarez (0–2)	—	31,531	27–25	W2
53	May 26	@ Giants	6–2	**Weaver** (4–3)	Anderson (0–1)	**Holland** (9)	37,017	28–25	W3
54	May 27	@ Rockies	3–4	Oh (2–1)	**Andriese** (3–3)	—	35,604	28–26	L1
55	May 28	@ Rockies	2–6	Díaz (1–0)	**Kelly** (4–6)	Bettis (1)	21,583	28–27	L2
56	May 29	@ Rockies	4–5	Hoffman (1–1)	**Ray** (4–2)	Oberg (1)	24,261	28–28	L3
57	May 30	@ Rockies	10–11 (10)	Oh (3–1)	**Hirano** (1–3)	—	30,371	28–29	L4
58	May 31	Mets	4–5	Wheeler (5–3)	**Andriese** (3–4)	Gsellman (1)	24,664	28–30	L5

June : 15–13 (Home: 6–8; Away: 9–5)

#	Date	Opponent	Score	Win	Loss	Save	Attendance	Record	Streak
59	June 1	Mets	6–5 (11)	**Hirano** (2–3)	Bashlor (0–3)	—	34,888	29–30	W1
60	June 2	Mets	7–1	**Kelly** (5–6)	Matz (4–4)	—	26,945	30–30	W2
61	June 3	Dodgers	1–3	Buehler (6–1)	**Ray** (4–3)	Jansen (18)	24,124	30–31	L1
62	June 4	Dodgers	0–9	Ryu (9–1)	**Clarke** (1–2)	—	29,784	30–32	L2
63	June 5	Dodgers	3–2 (11)	**Godley** (2–4)	Alexander (3–2)	—	22,753	31–32	W1
64	June 7	@ Blue Jays	8–2	**Kelly** (6–6)	Stroman (3–8)	—	16,555	32–32	W2
65	June 8	@ Blue Jays	6–0	**Greinke** (7–2)	Sanchez (3–7)	—	22,954	33–32	W3
66	June 9	@ Blue Jays	8–2	**Ray** (5–3)	Richard (0–2)	—	19,661	34–32	W4
67	June 10	@ Phillies	13–8	**Godley** (3–4)	Eickhoff (3–4)	—	26,255	35–32	W5
68	June 11	@ Phillies	4–7	Arrieta (6–5)	**Duplantier** (1–1)	Neris (14)	26,321	35–33	L1
69	June 12	@ Phillies	2–0	**Kelly** (7–6)	Eflin (6–6)	**Holland** (10)	29,047	36–33	W1
70	June 13	@ Nationals	5–0	**Greinke** (8–2)	Fedde (1–1)	—	24,909	37–33	W2
71	June 14	@ Nationals	3–7	Scherzer (5–5)	**Ray** (5–4)	—	29,853	37–34	L1
72	June 15	@ Nationals	10–3	**Hirano** (3–3)	Strasburg (7–4)	—	38,044	38–34	W1
73	June 16	@ Nationals	5–15	Sánchez (3–6)	**Bradley** (2–4)	—	29,032	38–35	L1
74	June 18	Rockies	1–8	Senzatela (6–5)	**Kelly** (7–7)	—	22,954	38–36	L2
75	June 19	Rockies	4–6	Gray (7–5)	**Greinke** (8–3)	Davis (9)	21,773	38–37	L3
76	June 20	Rockies	4–6	Oberg (5–0)	**Hirano** (3–4)	—	23,294	38–38	L4
77	June 21	Giants	5–11	Samardzija (4–6)	**Clarke** (1–3)	—	29,312	38–39	L5
78	June 22	Giants	4–7	Gott (4–0)	**Godley** (3–5)	Smith (20)	32,082	38–40	L6
79	June 23	Giants	3–2 (10)	**Andriese** (4–4)	Melancon (3–2)	—	25,071	39–40	W1
80	June 24	Dodgers	8–5	**López** (1–1)	Floro (2–2)	**Holland** (11)	24,675	40–40	W2
81	June 25	Dodgers	2–3	Urías (4–2)	**Ray** (5–5)	Jansen (22)	27,927	40–41	L1
82	June 26	Dodgers	8–2	**Clarke** (2–3)	Gonsolin (0–1)	—	28,752	41–41	W1
83	June 27	@ Giants	5–1	**Young** (1–0)	Beede (1–3)	—	30,790	42–41	W2
84	June 28	@ Giants	3–6	Anderson (3–2)	**Kelly** (7–8)	—	35,391	42–42	L1
85	June 29	@ Giants	4–3	**Greinke** (9–3)	Dyson (2–1)	**Holland** (12)	31,600	43–42	W1
86	June 30	@ Giants	4–10	Bumgarner (5–7)	**Ray** (5–6)	—	31,778	43–43	L1

July: 11–12 (Home: 6–4; Away: 5–8)

#	Date	Opponent	Score	Win	Loss	Save	Attendance	Record	Streak
87	July 2	@ Dodgers	4–5	García (1–2)	**Holland** (1–1)	—	52,969	43–44	L2
88	July 3	@ Dodgers	4–5 (10)	Kelly (3–3)	**López** (1–2)	—	53,327	43–45	L3
89	July 5	Rockies	8–0	**Greinke** (10–3)	Senzatela (7–6)	—	43,056	44–45	W1
90	July 6	Rockies	4–2	**Ray** (6–6)	Gray (9–6)	**Holland** (13)	28,276	45–45	W2
91	July 7	Rockies	5–3	**Young** (2–0)	Márquez (8–4)	**Holland** (14)	22,964	46–45	W3
–	July 9	**90th All-Star Game in Cleveland, Ohio**							
92	July 12	@ Cardinals	4–2	**Ray** (7–6)	Miller (3–4)	**Holland** (15)	44,960	47–45	W4
93	July 13	@ Cardinals	2–4	Hudson (8–4)	**Kelly** (7–9)	Martínez (4)	46,152	47–46	L1
94	July 14	@ Cardinals	2–5	Wainwright (6–7)	**Greinke** (10–4)	Martínez (5)	43,439	47–47	L2
95	July 16	@ Rangers	9–2	**Young** (3–0)	Lynn (12–5)	—	19,202	48–47	W1
96	July 17	@ Rangers	19–4	**Ray** (8–6)	Chavez (3–5)	—	26,681	49–47	W2
97	July 18	Brewers	1–5	Davies (8–2)	**López** (1–3)	—	23,985	49–48	L1
98	July 19	Brewers	10–7	**Bradley** (3–4)	Chacín (3–10)	**Holland** (16)	28,505	50–48	W1
99	July 20	Brewers	3–8	Houser (3–4)	**Chafin** (0–2)	—	38,567	50–49	L1
100	July 21	Brewers	4–7	Peralta (4–3)	**López** (1–4)	Hader (22)	33,111	50–50	L2
101	July 22	Orioles	6–3	**Ray** (9–6)	Brooks (2–4)	**Holland** (17)	19,192	51–50	W1
102	July 23	Orioles	2–7	Bundy (5–11)	**Kelly** (7–10)	—	20,253	51–51	L1
103	July 24	Orioles	5–2	**Clarke** (3–3)	Means (8–6)	**López** (1)	20,452	52–51	W1
104	July 26	@ Marlins	2–3	Quijada (1–3)	**Holland** (1–2)	—	8,867	52–52	L1
105	July 27	@ Marlins	9–2	**Young** (4–0)	Yamamoto (4–2)	—	13,047	53–52	W1
106	July 28	@ Marlins	1–5	Quijada (2–3)	**Ray** (9–7)	—	11,538	53–53	L1
107	July 29	@ Marlins	6–11	Smith (7–4)	**Kelly** (7–11)	—	7,048	53–54	L2
108	July 30	@ Yankees	4–2	**Clarke** (4–3)	Happ (8–6)	**Bradley** (1)	47,281	54–54	W1
109	July 31	@ Yankees	5–7	Ottavino (4–3)	**Hirano** (3–5)	Chapman (27)	43,979	54–55	L1

August: 16–11 (Home: 10–6; Away: 6–5)

#	Date	Opponent	Score	Win	Loss	Save	Attendance	Record	Streak
110	August 2	Nationals	0–3	Ross (1–3)	**Young** (4–1)	Doolittle (24)	24,298	54–56	L2
111	August 3	Nationals	18–7	**Ray** (10–7)	Strasburg (14–5)	—	33,966	55–56	W1
112	August 4	Nationals	7–5	**Hirano** (4–5)	Suero (3–6)	**Bradley** (2)	22,976	56–56	W2
113	August 5	Phillies	3–7	Velasquez (4–6)	**Kelly** (7–12)	—	18,319	56–57	L1
114	August 6	Phillies	8–4	**Chafin** (1–2)	Suárez (3–1)	—	17,446	57–57	W1
115	August 7	Phillies	6–1	**Gallen** (2–3)	Vargas (6–6)	—	18,140	58–57	W2
116	August 9	@ Dodgers	3–2 (11)	**Chafin** (2–2)	Urías (4–3)	**Bradley** (3)	49,538	59–57	W3
117	August 10	@ Dodgers	0–4	Maeda (8–8)	**Young** (4–2)	—	52,606	59–58	L1
118	August 11	@ Dodgers	3–9	Ryu (12–2)	**Leake** (9–9)	—	44,619	59–59	L2
119	August 12	@ Rockies	8–6	**Kelly** (8–12)	Bettis (1–6)	**Bradley** (4)	32,160	60–59	W1
120	August 13	@ Rockies	9–3	**Ginkel** (1–0)	Hoffman (1–4)	—	31,815	61–59	W2
121	August 14	@ Rockies	6–7	Oberg (6–1)	**Bradley** (3–5)	—	32,247	61–60	L1
122	August 15	Giants	0–7	Rodríguez (5–6)	**Young** (4–3)	—	19,037	61–61	L2
123	August 16	Giants	9–10 (11)	Smith (5–0)	**López** (1–5)	Gott (1)	23,642	61–62	L3
124	August 17	Giants	6–11	Webb (1–0)	**Clarke** (4–4)	—	35,366	61–63	L4
125	August 18	Giants	6–1	**Kelly** (9–12)	Bumgarner (8–8)	—	26,079	62–63	W1
126	August 19	Rockies	5–3	**López** (2–5)	Davis (1–6)	**Bradley** (5)	15,443	63–63	W2
127	August 20	Rockies	8–7	**Young** (5–3)	Freeland (3–11)	**Bradley** (6)	17,691	64–63	W3
128	August 21	Rockies	2–7	Melville (1–0)	**Leake** (9–10)	—	17,707	64–64	L1
129	August 23	@ Brewers	1–6	Lyles (8–8)	**Kelly** (9–13)	—	42,209	64–65	L2
130	August 24	@ Brewers	0–4	Anderson (6–3)	**Gallen** (2–4)	—	41,737	64–66	L3
131	August 25	@ Brewers	5–2	**Ray** (11–7)	Davies (8–7)	**Bradley** (7)	38,920	65–66	W1
132	August 26	@ Giants	6–4	**Young** (6–3)	Beede (3–8)	**Bradley** (8)	29,169	66–66	W2
133	August 27	@ Giants	3–2	**Leake** (10–10)	Coonrod (4–1)	**Bradley** (9)	28,262	67–66	W3
134	August 29	Dodgers	11–5	**Andriese** (5–4)	Ryu (12–5)	—	22,581	68–66	W4
135	August 30	Dodgers	5–4	**Bradley** (4–5)	García (1–4)	—	34,149	69–66	W5
136	August 31	Dodgers	6–5	**Ray** (12–7)	Kershaw (13–4)	**Bradley** (10)	50,180	70–66	W6

September: 15–11 (Home: 11–5; Away: 4–6)

#	Date	Opponent	Score	Win	Loss	Save	Attendance	Record	Streak
137	September 1	Dodgers	3–4	Sadler (4–0)	**Clarke** (4–5)	Báez (1)	34,439	70–67	L1
138	September 2	Padres	14–7	**Leake** (11–10)	Quantrill (6–6)	—	23,477	71–67	W1
139	September 3	Padres	2–1	**Kelly** (10–13)	Bolaños (0–1)	**Bradley** (11)	15,402	72–67	W2
140	September 4	Padres	4–1	**Gallen** (3–4)	Stammen (7–7)	**Bradley** (12)	18,096	73–67	W3
141	September 6	@ Reds	7–5	**Ginkel** (2–0)	Mahle (2–11)	**Bradley** (13)	19,048	74–67	W4
142	September 7	@ Reds	2–0	**Young** (7–3)	Castillo (14–6)	**Sherfy** (1)	34,804	75–67	W5
143	September 8	@ Reds	3–4	Iglesias (3–11)	**López** (2–6)	—	19,717	75–68	L1
144	September 9	@ Mets	1–3	deGrom (9–8)	**Kelly** (10–14)	Lugo (5)	21,337	75–69	L2
145	September 10	@ Mets	2–3	Wheeler (11–7)	**Gallen** (3–5)	Wilson (2)	20,843	75–70	L3
146	September 11	@ Mets	0–9	Matz (10–8)	**Ray** (12–8)	—	21,841	75–71	L4
147	September 12	@ Mets	1–11	Stroman (8–13)	**Young** (7–4)	—	21,856	75–72	L5
148	September 13	Reds	3–4	Castillo (15–6)	**Leake** (11–11)	Iglesias (30)	35,158	75–73	L6
149	September 14	Reds	1–0	**Kelly** (11–14)	DeSclafani (9–9)	**Bradley** (14)	35,151	76–73	W1
150	September 15	Reds	1–3	Bauer (11–12)	**Gallen** (3–6)	Iglesias (31)	25,193	76–74	L1
151	September 16	Marlins	7–5	**Hirano** (5–5)	Guerrero (1–2)	**Ginkel** (1)	15,897	77–74	W1
152	September 17	Marlins	6–12	Smith (9–10)	**Andriese** (5–5)	—	19,745	77–75	L1
153	September 18	Marlins	5–4	**Leake** (12–11)	Alcantara (5–14)	**Bradley** (15)	17,731	78–75	W1
154	September 20	@ Padres	9–0	**Kelly** (12–14)	Lauer (8–10)	—	27,023	79–75	W2
155	September 21	@ Padres	4–2	**Clarke** (5–5)	Strahm (5–10)	**Bradley** (16)	30,191	80–75	W3
156	September 22	@ Padres	4–6 (10)	Strahm (6–10)	**López** (2–7)	—	31,293	80–76	L1
157	September 23	Cardinals	7–9	Wainwright (14–9)	**Young** (7–5)	Martínez (24)	24,826	80–77	L2
158	September 24	Cardinals	3–2 (19)	**Ginkel** (3–0)	Brebbia (3–4)	—	26,097	81–77	W1
159	September 25	Cardinals	9–7	**Kelly** (13–14)	Fernández (0–1)	**Bradley** (17)	21,420	82–77	W2
160	September 27	Padres	6–3	**Scott** (1–0)	Perdomo (2–4)	**Bradley** (18)	32,244	83–77	W3
161	September 28	Padres	6–5	**Sherfy** (1–0)	Bednar (0–2)	**Ginkel** (2)	46,477	84–77	W4
162	September 29	Padres	1–0	**Crichton** (1–0)	Strahm (6–11)	—	45,446	85–77	W5

Legend: = Win = Loss = Postponement
Bold = Diamondbacks team member

== Player stats ==
=== Batting ===
Note: G = Games played; AB = At bats; R = Runs; H = Hits; 2B = Doubles; 3B = Triples; HR = Home runs; RBI = Runs batted in; SB = Stolen bases; BB = Walks; AVG = Batting average; SLG = Slugging average

Player	G	AB	R	H	2B	3B	HR	RBI	SB	BB	AVG	SLG
Eduardo Escobar	158	636	94	171	29	10	35	118	5	50	.269	.511
Ketel Marte	144	569	97	187	36	9	32	92	10	53	.329	.592
Nick Ahmed	158	556	79	141	33	6	19	82	8	52	.254	.437
Christian Walker	152	529	86	137	26	1	29	73	8	67	.259	.476
Adam Jones	137	485	66	126	25	1	16	67	2	31	.260	.414
Jarrod Dyson	130	400	65	92	11	2	7	27	30	47	.230	.320
David Peralta	99	382	48	105	29	3	12	57	0	35	.275	.461
Carson Kelly	111	314	46	77	19	0	18	47	0	48	.245	.478
Wilmer Flores	89	265	31	84	18	0	9	37	0	15	.317	.487
Tim Locastro	91	212	38	53	12	2	1	17	17	14	.250	.340
Ildemaro Vargas	92	201	25	54	9	1	6	24	1	9	.269	.413
Jake Lamb	78	187	26	36	8	2	6	30	1	32	.193	.353
Alex Avila	63	164	22	34	8	0	9	24	1	36	.207	.421
Josh Rojas	41	138	17	30	7	0	2	16	4	18	.217	.312
Kevin Cron	39	71	12	15	4	0	6	16	0	4	.211	.521
Blake Swihart	31	66	9	9	0	0	3	9	0	4	.136	.273
John Ryan Murphy	25	62	9	11	3	0	4	7	0	6	.177	.419
Caleb Joseph	20	38	5	8	2	0	0	3	0	1	.211	.263
Abraham Almonte	17	31	11	9	3	1	1	4	0	7	.290	.548
Domingo Leyba	21	25	6	7	2	1	0	5	0	4	.280	.440
Yasmany Tomás	4	6	0	0	0	0	0	0	0	0	.000	.000
Pitcher totals	162	296	21	33	4	1	5	23	1	7	.111	.182
Team totals	162	5633	813	1419	288	40	220	778	88	540	.252	.434

=== Pitching ===
Note: W = Wins; L = Losses; ERA = Earned run average; G = Games pitched; GS = Games started; SV = Saves; IP = Innings pitched; H = Hits allowed; R = Runs allowed; ER = Earned runs allowed; BB = Walks allowed; SO = Strikeouts

Player	W	L	ERA	G	GS	SV	IP	H	R	ER	BB	SO
Merrill Kelly	13	14	4.42	32	32	0	183.1	184	95	90	57	158
Robbie Ray	12	8	4.34	33	33	0	174.1	150	91	84	84	235
Zack Greinke	10	4	2.90	23	23	0	146.0	117	48	47	21	135
Taylor Clarke	5	5	5.31	23	15	1	84.2	86	55	50	30	68
Alex Young	7	5	3.56	17	15	0	83.1	72	40	33	27	71
Zack Godley	3	5	6.39	27	9	2	76.0	81	55	54	35	58
Archie Bradley	4	5	3.52	66	1	18	71.2	67	30	28	36	87
Matt Andriese	5	5	4.71	54	0	1	70.2	72	37	37	27	79
Luke Weaver	4	3	2.94	12	12	0	64.1	55	22	21	14	69
Yoan López	2	7	3.41	70	0	1	60.2	52	27	23	17	42
Mike Leake	3	3	4.35	10	10	0	60.0	74	36	29	8	27
T. J. McFarland	0	0	4.82	51	0	0	56.0	71	35	30	20	35
Yoshihisa Hirano	5	5	4.75	62	0	1	53.0	51	31	28	22	61
Andrew Chafin	2	2	3.76	77	0	0	52.2	52	23	22	18	68
Zac Gallen	2	3	2.89	8	8	0	43.2	37	14	14	18	53
Jon Duplantier	1	1	4.42	15	3	1	36.2	39	18	18	18	34
Greg Holland	1	2	4.54	40	0	17	35.2	25	18	18	24	41
Stefan Crichton	1	0	3.56	28	0	0	30.1	23	12	12	8	33
Kevin Ginkel	3	0	1.48	25	0	2	24.1	15	7	4	9	28
Matt Koch	0	0	9.15	9	0	0	20.2	29	21	21	4	9
James Sherfy	1	0	5.89	17	0	1	18.1	23	12	12	5	22
Robby Scott	1	0	4.91	11	0	0	7.1	8	4	4	7	9
Joel Payamps	0	0	4.50	2	0	0	4.0	4	2	2	3	3
John Ryan Murphy	0	0	27.00	2	0	0	3.0	10	9	9	3	0
Alex Avila	0	0	4.50	2	0	0	2.0	2	1	1	1	1
Caleb Joseph	0	0	0.00	2	0	0	1.1	0	0	0	0	0
Taijuan Walker	0	0	0.00	1	1	0	1.0	1	0	0	0	1
Team totals	85	77	4.25	162	162	45	1465.0	1400	743	691	516	1427

== Roster ==
2019 Arizona Diamondbacks
Roster
Pitchers: 35 Matt Andriese; 25 Archie Bradley; 40 Andrew Chafin; 45 Taylor Clarke; 58 Stefan Crichton; 57 Jon Duplantier; 59 Zac Gallen; 37 Kevin Ginkel; 52 Zack Godley; 21 Zack Greinke; 66 Yoshihisa Hirano; 56 Greg Holland; 29 Merrill Kelly; 55 Matt Koch; 8 Mike Leake; 50 Yoan López; 30 T. J. McFarland; 36 Joel Payamps; 38 Robbie Ray; 63 Robby Scott; 54 Jimmie Sherfy; 99 Taijuan Walker; 24 Luke Weaver; 49 Alex Young	Catchers: 31 Alex Avila; 14 Caleb Joseph; 18 Carson Kelly; 36 John Ryan Murphy; Infielders: 13 Nick Ahmed; 32 Kevin Cron; 5 Eduardo Escobar; 41 Wilmer Flores; 22 Jake Lamb; 2 Domingo Leyba; 15 Ildemaro Vargas; 53 Christian Walker	Outfielders: 48 Abraham Almonte; 1 Jarrod Dyson; 10 Adam Jones; 16 Tim Locastro; 4 Ketel Marte; 6 David Peralta; 9 Joshua Rojas; 19 Blake Swihart; Other batters: 26 Yasmany Tomás	Manager: 17 Torey Lovullo; Coaches: 23 Mike Butcher (pitching); 83 Dan Butler (bullpen catcher); 11 Darnell Coles (hitting); 43 Mike Fetters (bullpen); 7 Robby Hammock (quality control/catching); 77 Eric Hinske (assistant hitting); 39 Dave McKay (first base); 12 Jerry Narron (bench); 8, 3 Tony Perezchica (third base); 84 Humberto Quintero (bullpen catcher); 60 Luis Urueta (coach)

== Minor league affiliations ==
Level	Team	League	Location
AAA	Reno Aces	Pacific Coast League	Reno, Nevada
AA	Jackson Generals	Southern League	Jackson, Tennessee
Advanced A	Visalia Rawhide	California League	Visalia, California
A	Kane County Cougars	Midwest League	Geneva, Illinois
Short Season A	Hillsboro Hops	Northwest League	Hillsboro, Oregon
Rookie	Missoula Osprey	Pioneer League	Missoula, Montana
Rookie	AZL D-backs	Arizona League	Scottsdale, Arizona
Rookie	DSL D-backs	Dominican Summer League	Boca Chica, Dominican Republic
