= 2019 Colorado Rockies season =

2019 Colorado Rockies
- League: National League
- Division: West
- Ballpark: Coors Field
- City: Denver, Colorado
- Record: 71–91 (.438)
- Divisional place: 4th
- Owners: Charles & Richard Monfort
- General manager: Jeff Bridich
- Manager: Bud Black
- Television: AT&T Sportsnet Rocky Mountain (Drew Goodman, Jeff Huson, Ryan Spilborghs)
- Radio: KOA (English); Colorado Rockies Radio Network (Jack Corrigan, Jerry Schemmel); KNRV (Spanish) (Salvador Hernandez, Javier Olivas, Carlos Valdez)
- Stats: ESPN.com; Baseball Reference

The 2019 Colorado Rockies season was the franchise's 27th in Major League Baseball. It was their 25th season at Coors Field. Bud Black returned as Manager for his third season in 2019. Before the season began Black was officially offered a 3-year contract extension deal that would see him remain Manager till the 2022 season. After making the playoffs the previous two seasons, the Rockies were eliminated from postseason contention on September 12 after 51 losses in 73 games.

== Offseason ==
- December 21, 2018: Daniel Murphy was signed as a free agent by the Colorado Rockies.
- March 23, 2019: Mike Tauchman was traded by the Colorado Rockies to the New York Yankees for Phillip Diehl.

== Regular season ==
=== Season standings ===
==== National League West ====
NL West
Team	W	L	Pct.	GB	Home	Road
Los Angeles Dodgers	106	56	.654	—	59‍–‍22	47‍–‍34
Arizona Diamondbacks	85	77	.525	21	44‍–‍37	41‍–‍40
San Francisco Giants	77	85	.475	29	35‍–‍46	42‍–‍39
Colorado Rockies	71	91	.438	35	43‍–‍38	28‍–‍53
San Diego Padres	70	92	.432	36	36‍–‍45	34‍–‍47

==== National League Wild Card ====
Division leaders
Team	W	L	Pct.
Los Angeles Dodgers	106	56	.654
Atlanta Braves	97	65	.599
St. Louis Cardinals	91	71	.562

Wild Card teams (Top 2 teams qualify for postseason)
Team	W	L	Pct.	GB
Washington Nationals	93	69	.574	+4
Milwaukee Brewers	89	73	.549	—
New York Mets	86	76	.531	3
Arizona Diamondbacks	85	77	.525	4
Chicago Cubs	84	78	.519	5
Philadelphia Phillies	81	81	.500	8
San Francisco Giants	77	85	.475	12
Cincinnati Reds	75	87	.463	14
Colorado Rockies	71	91	.438	18
San Diego Padres	70	92	.432	19
Pittsburgh Pirates	69	93	.426	20
Miami Marlins	57	105	.352	32

=== Record vs. opponents ===
2019 National League record Source: MLB Standings Grid – 2019
Team	AZ	ATL	CHC	CIN	COL	LAD	MIA	MIL	NYM	PHI	PIT	SD	SF	STL	WSH	AL
Arizona	—	4–3	2–4	3–3	9–10	8–11	3–4	2–5	2–5	4–2	6–1	11–8	10–9	3–3	4–3	14–6
Atlanta	3–4	—	5–2	3–4	3–3	2–4	15–4	3–3	11–8	9–10	5–2	5–2	5–2	4–2	11–8	13–7
Chicago	4–2	2–5	—	8–11	3–3	3–4	6–1	9–10	5–2	2–5	11–8	4–3	4–2	9–10	2–4	12–8
Cincinnati	3–3	4–3	11–8	—	3–3	1–5	6–1	8–11	3–4	3–4	7–12	5–2	4–3	7–12	1–5	9–11
Colorado	10–9	3–3	3–3	3–3	—	4–15	5–2	5–2	2–4	3–4	2–5	11–8	7–12	2–5	3–4	8–12
Los Angeles	11–8	4–2	4–3	5–1	15–4	—	5–1	4–3	5–2	5–2	6–0	13–6	12–7	3–4	4–3	10–10
Miami	4–3	4–15	1–6	1–6	2–5	1–5	—	2–5	6–13	10–9	3–3	4–2	3–3	3–4	4–15	9–11
Milwaukee	5–2	3–3	10–9	11–8	2–5	3–4	5–2	—	5–1	4–3	15–4	3–4	2–4	9–10	4–2	8–12
New York	5–2	8–11	2–5	4–3	4–2	2–5	13–6	1–5	—	7–12	5–1	3–3	3–4	2–5	12–7	15–5
Philadelphia	2–4	10–9	5–2	4–3	4–3	2–5	9–10	3–4	12–7	—	4–2	3–3	3–4	4–2	5–14	11–9
Pittsburgh	1–6	2–5	8–11	12–7	5–2	0–6	3–3	4–15	1–5	2–4	—	6–1	5–2	5–14	3–4	12–8
San Diego	8–11	2–5	3–4	2–5	8–11	6–13	2–4	4–3	3–3	3–3	1–6	—	9–10	4–2	4–3	11–9
San Francisco	9–10	2–5	2–4	3–4	12–7	7–12	3–3	4–2	4–3	4–3	2–5	10–9	—	3–4	1–5	11–9
St. Louis	3–3	2–4	10–9	12–7	5–2	4–3	4–3	10–9	5–2	2–4	14–5	2–4	4–3	—	5–2	9–11
Washington	3–4	8–11	4–2	5–1	4–3	3–4	15–4	2–4	7–12	14–5	4–3	3–4	5–1	2–5	—	14–6

=== Transactions ===
- June 21, 2019: Mike Dunn was released by the Colorado Rockies.
- July 10, 2019: Yonder Alonso was signed as a free agent by the Colorado Rockies.
- July 26, 2019: Mark Reynolds and Seung-hwan Oh were released by the Colorado Rockies.
- August 15, 2019: Chris Iannetta was released by the Colorado Rockies

=== Major League Debuts ===
- Batters
  - Josh Fuentes (April 6)
  - Yonathan Daza (April 9)
  - Brendan Rodgers (May 17)
  - Dom Núñez (August 13)
  - Sam Hilliard (August 27)
- Pitchers
  - Jesús Tinoco (May 31)
  - Peter Lambert (June 6)
  - Phillip Diehl (June 11)
  - Rico Garcia (August 27)

=== Game log ===
2019 game log: 71–91 (Home: 43–38; Away: 28–53 )
March: 2–2 (Home: 0–0; Away: 2–2 )

#	Date	Opponent	Score	Win	Loss	Save	Attendance	Record	Streak
1	March 28	@ Marlins	6–3	**Freeland** (1–0)	Ureña (0–1)		25,423	1–0	W1
2	March 29	@ Marlins	6–1	**Márquez** (1–0)	Conley (0–1)		6,503	2–0	W2
3	March 30	@ Marlins	7–3	López (1–0)	**Anderson** (0–1)		7,642	2–1	L1
4	March 31	@ Marlins	3–0	Alcántara (1–0)	**Gray** (0–1)	Romo (1)	7,559	2–2	L2

April: 11–15 (Home: 5–7; Away: 6–8 )

#	Date	Opponent	Score	Win	Loss	Save	Attendance	Record	Streak
5	April 1	@ Rays	7–1	Yarbrough (1–0)	**Bettis** (0–1)		10,860	2–3	L3
6	April 2	@ Rays	4–0	Snell (1–1)	**Freeland** (1–1)		10,933	2–4	L4
7	April 3	@ Rays	1–0 (11)	**Davis** (1–0)	Roe (0–1)		11,093	3–4	W1
8	April 5	Dodgers	10–6	Maeda (2–0)	**Anderson** (0–2)		48,404	3–5	L1
9	April 6	Dodgers	7–2	Buehler (1–0)	**Gray** (0–2)	Jansen (4)	47,880	3–6	L2
10	April 7	Dodgers	12–6	Kelly (1–1)	**Bettis** (0–2)		41,232	3–7	L3
11	April 8	Braves	8–6	Teherán (1–1)	**Freeland** (1–2)	Minter (1)	25,199	3–8	L4
12	April 9	Braves	7–1	Fried (2–0)	**Márquez** (1–1)		26,124	3–9	L5
–	April 10	Braves	PPD	Makeup Aug. 26					
13	April 11	@ Giants	0–1	Samardzija (1–0)	**Gray** (0–3)		33,616	3–10	L6
14	April 12	@ Giants	2–3 (18)	Bergen (2–0)	**Johnson** (0–1)		33,616	3–11	L7
15	April 13	@ Giants	5–2	Bumgarner (1–2)	**Freeland** (1–3)	Dyson (1)	32,607	3–12	L8
16	April 14	@ Giants	4–0	**Márquez** (2–1)	Holland (1–2)		35,513	4–12	W1
17	April 15	@ Padres	5–2	**Senzatela** (1–0)	Lucchesi (2–2)	**Davis** (1)	24,867	5–12	W2
18	April 16	@ Padres	8–2	**Gray** (1–3)	Margevicius (1–2)		24,963	6–12	W3
19	April 18	Phillies	6–2	**Freeland** (2–3)	Eflin (2–2)		27,562	7–12	W4
20	April 19	Phillies	4–3 (12)	**Bettis** (1–2)	Nicasio (0–1)		35,423	8–12	W5
21	April 20	Phillies	8–5	Nola (2–0)	**Senzatela** (1–1)	Neris (3)	40,530	8–13	L1
22	April 21	Phillies	4–1	**Gray** (2–3)	Eickhoff (0–1)		28,287	9–13	W1
23	April 22	Nationals	7–5	**Oh** (1–0)	Suero (1–2)	**Davis** (2)	20,517	10–13	W2
24	April 23	Nationals	3–6	Corbin (2–0)	**Hoffman** (0–1)	Doolittle (3)	24,456	10–14	L1
25	April 24	Nationals	9–5	**Márquez** (3–1)	Sánchez (0–3)	**Davis** (3)	33,135	11–14	W1
26	April 26	@ Braves	8–4	**Senzatela** (2–1)	Fried (3–1)	**Davis** (4)	40,282	12–14	W2
27	April 27	@ Braves	9–5	**Shaw** (1–0)	Minter (0–3)		38,243	13–14	W3
28	April 28	@ Braves	8–7	Webb (1–0)	**Oh** (1–1)	Jackson (1)	33,919	13–15	L1
29	April 29	@ Brewers	5–1	Davies (3–0)	**Freeland** (2–4)		23,356	13–16	L2
30	April 30	@ Brewers	4–3	Chacín (3–3)	**Márquez** (3–2)	Hader (7)	25,673	13–17	L3

May: 16–10 (Home: 11–5; Away: 5–5 )

#	Date	Opponent	Score	Win	Loss	Save	Attendance	Record	Streak
31	May 1	@ Brewers	11–4	**Estévez** (1–0)	Burnes (0–3)		28,780	14–17	W1
32	May 2	@ Brewers	11–6	**Gray** (3–3)	Peralta (1–1)		21,319	15–17	W2
33	May 3	Diamondbacks	10–9	Ray (2–1)	**Anderson** (0–3)	Holland (8)	29,574	15–18	L1
34	May 4	Diamondbacks	9–2	Weaver (3–1)	**Freeland** (2–5)		37,765	15–19	L2
35	May 5	Diamondbacks	8–7	**Oberg** (1–0)	Bradley (1–3)	**Davis** (5)	40,262	16–19	W1
36	May 7	Giants	14–4	Bumgarner (2–4)	**Senzatela** (2–2)		21,707	16–20	L1
–	May 8	Giants	PPD						
37	May 9	Giants	12–11	**Shaw** (2–0)	Beede (0–1)	**Davis** (6)	25,368	17–20	W1
38	May 10	Padres	12–2	**Márquez** (4–2)	Lauer (2–4)		27,594	18–20	W2
39	May 11	Padres	4–3	Stammen (4–1)	**Davis** (1–1)	Yates (16)	37,118	18–21	L1
40	May 12	Padres	10–7	**Senzatela** (3–2)	Margevicius (2–4)		40,234	19–21	W1
41	May 14	@ Red Sox	5–4 (11)	**Dunn** (1–0)	Brasier (2–2)	**Davis** (7)	35,804	20–21	W2
42	May 15	@ Red Sox	6–5 (10)	Workman (3–1)	**Bettis** (1–3)		37,032	20–22	L1
43	May 17	@ Phillies	5–4	Irvin (2–0)	**Gray** (3–4)	Neris (6)	28,079	20–23	L2
44	May 18	@ Phillies	2–1	Nola (4–0)	**Senzatela** (3–3)	Neris (7)	42,354	20–24	L3
45	May 19	@ Phillies	7–5	García (1–0)	**Shaw** (2–1)	Neshek (3)	38,603	20–25	L4
46	May 21	@ Pirates	5–0	**Márquez** (5–2)	Archer (1–4)		12,265	21–25	W1
47	May 22	@ Pirates	9–3	**Gray** (4–4)	DuRapau (0–1)		9,534	22–25	W2
48	May 23	@ Pirates	14–6	Lyles (5–1)	**Senzatela** (3–4)		15,490	22–26	L1
49	May 24	Orioles	8–6	**Oberg** (2–0)	Givens (0–3)		32,397	23–26	W1
50	May 25	Orioles	6–8	Cashner (5–2)	**Freeland** (2–6)	Lucas (1)	41,239	23–27	L1
51	May 26	Orioles	8–7	**Oberg** (3–0)	Fry (0–2)		46,815	24–27	W1
52	May 27	Diamondbacks	4–3 (11)	**Oh** (2–1)	Andriese (3–3)		35,604	25–27	W2
53	May 28	Diamondbacks	6–2	**Díaz** (1–0)	Kelly (4–6)	**Bettis** (1)	21,583	26–27	W3
54	May 29	Diamondbacks	5–4	**Hoffman** (1–1)	Ray (4–2)	**Oberg** (1)	24,261	27–27	W4
55	May 30	Diamondbacks	11–10 (10)	**Oh** (3–1)	Hirano (1–3)		30,371	28–27	W5
56	May 31	Blue Jays	13–6	**Márquez** (6–2)	Jackson (0–3)		32,990	29–27	W6

June: 15–13 (Home: 8–5; Away: 7–8 )

#	Date	Opponent	Score	Win	Loss	Save	Attendance	Record	Streak
57	June 1	Blue Jays	4–2	**Gray** (5–4)	Stroman (3–7)	**Oberg** (2)	34,025	30–27	W7
58	June 2	Blue Jays	5–1	**Senzatela** (4–4)	Sanchez (3–6)		37,861	31–27	W8
59	June 4	@ Cubs	3–6	Hendricks (6–4)	**Hoffman** (1–2)	Strop (5)	36,753	31–28	L1
60	June 5	@ Cubs	8–9	Kintzler (2–0)	**Márquez** (6–3)	Cishek (6)	35,395	31–29	L2
61	June 6	@ Cubs	3–1	**Lambert** (1–0)	Quintana (4–5)	**Oberg** (3)	36,375	32–29	W1
62	June 7	@ Mets	5–1	**Senzatela** (5–4)	deGrom (3–6)		27,520	33–29	W2
63	June 8	@ Mets	3–5	Matz (5–4)	**Gray** (5–5)	Díaz (14)	29,077	33–30	L1
64	June 9	@ Mets	1–6	Syndergaard (4–4)	**Hoffman** (1–3)		29,531	33–31	L2
65	June 10	Cubs	6–5	**Oberg** (4–0)	Cishek (1–3)	**Davis** (8)	44,859	34–31	W1
66	June 11	Cubs	10–3	**Lambert** (2–0)	Quintana (4–6)		43,126	35–31	W2
67	June 12	Cubs	1–10	Hamels (6–2)	**Senzatela** (5–5)		47,412	35–32	L1
68	June 13	Padres	9–6	**Gray** (6–5)	Strahm (2–6)		35,504	36–32	W1
69	June 14	Padres	12–16 (12)	Stammen (5–3)	**Díaz** (1–1)		38,077	36–33	L1
70	June 15	Padres	14–8	**Márquez** (7–3)	Lauer (5–6)		46,133	37–33	W1
71	June 16	Padres	13–14	Reyes (3–0)	**Davis** (1–2)	Yates (24)	47,526	37–34	L1
72	June 18	@ Diamondbacks	8–1	**Senzatela** (6–5)	Kelly (7–7)		22,954	38–34	W1
73	June 19	@ Diamondbacks	6–4	**Gray** (7–5)	Greinke (8–3)	**Davis** (9)	21,773	39–34	W2
74	June 20	@ Diamondbacks	6–4 (10)	**Oberg** (5–0)	Hirano (3–4)		23,294	40–34	W3
75	June 21	@ Dodgers	2–4	Buehler (8–1)	**Díaz** (1–2)		54,044	40–35	L1
76	June 22	@ Dodgers	4–5 (11)	Kelly (2–3)	**Tinoco** (0–1)		53,096	40–36	L2
77	June 23	@ Dodgers	3–6	Jansen (3–2)	**Oberg** (5–1)		50,023	40–37	L3
78	June 24	@ Giants	2–0	**Gray** (8–5)	Pomeranz (2–8)	**Davis** (10)	30,018	41–37	W1
79	June 25	@ Giants	2–4	Bumgarner (4–7)	**Gonzalez** (0–1)	Smith (21)	31,458	41–38	L1
80	June 26	@ Giants	6–3	**Márquez** (8–3)	Samardzija (4–7)	**Davis** (11)	33,765	42–38	W1
81	June 27	Dodgers	8–12	Báez (3–2)	**Davis** (1–3)		47,452	42–39	L1
82	June 28	Dodgers	13–9	**Senzatela** (7–5)	Ryu (9–2)		46,065	43–39	W1
83	June 29	Dodgers	5–3	**Gray** (9–5)	Kershaw (7–2)	**Davis** (12)	48,101	44–39	W2
84	June 30	Dodgers	5–10	Floro (3–2)	**Bettis** (1–4)		47,713	44–40	L1

July: 6–19 (Home: 3–9; Away: 3–10 )

#	Date	Opponent	Score	Win	Loss	Save	Attendance	Record	Streak
85	July 2	Astros	8–9	Harris (3–1)	**McGee** (0–1)	Osuna (18)	47,864	44–41	L2
86	July 3	Astros	2–4	Miley (7–4)	**Lambert** (2–1)	Osuna (19)	48,308	44–42	L3
87	July 5	@ Diamondbacks	0–8	Greinke (10–3)	**Senzatela** (7–6)		43,056	44–43	L4
88	July 6	@ Diamondbacks	2–4	Ray (6–6)	**Gray** (9–6)	Holland (13)	28,276	44–44	L5
89	July 7	@ Diamondbacks	3–5	Young (2–0)	**Márquez** (8–4)	Holland (14)	22,964	44–45	L6
**90th All-Star Game in Cleveland, Ohio**
90	July 12	Reds	3–2	**Díaz** (2–2)	Hernandez (2–5)	**Davis** (13)	41,368	45–45	W1
91	July 13	Reds	9–17	Hughes (3–2)	**Bettis** (1–5)		43,650	45–46	L1
92	July 14	Reds	10–9	**Senzatela** (8–6)	Mahle (2–10)	**Davis** (14)	40,624	46–46	W1
93	July 15 (1)	Giants	2–19	Samardzija (7–7)	**Márquez** (8–5)		26,434	46–47	L1
94	July 15 (2)	Giants	1–2	Rodríguez (4–5)	**Gonzalez** (0–2)	Smith (24)	34,424	46–48	L2
95	July 16	Giants	4–8 (10)	Smith (3–0)	**Davis** (1–4)		47,413	46–49	L3
96	July 17	Giants	8–11	Holland (2–4)	**Gray** (9–7)	Melancon (1)	40,157	46–50	L4
97	July 19	@ Yankees	2–8	Happ (8–5)	**Freeland** (2–7)	Tarpley (2)	44,316	46–51	L5
98	July 20	@ Yankees	5–11	Tanaka (7–5)	**Senzatela** (8–7)		41,499	46–52	L6
99	July 21	@ Yankees	8–4	**Márquez** (9–5)	Paxton (5–5)		41,841	47–52	W1
–	July 22	@ Nationals	Postponed (inclement weather); Rescheduled for July 24 as part of a doubleheader.						
100	July 23	@ Nationals	1–11	Strasburg (13–4)	**Lambert** (2–2)		22,612	47–53	L1
101	July 24 (1)	@ Nationals	2–3	Suero (3–5)	**Estévez** (1–1)	Doolittle (22)	14,628	47–54	L2
102	July 24 (2)	@ Nationals	0–2	Corbin (8–5)	**Freeland** (2–8)	Doolittle (23)	23,843	47–55	L3
103	July 25	@ Nationals	8–7	**Díaz** (3–2)	Rodney (0–4)	**Davis** (15)	26,831	48–55	W1
104	July 26	@ Reds	12–2	**Márquez** (10–5)	Castillo (9–4)		23,045	49–55	W2
105	July 27	@ Reds	1–3	DeSclafani (6–5)	**Gonzalez** (0–3)	Iglesias (18)	25,115	49–56	L1
106	July 28	@ Reds	2–3	Sims (2–1)	**McGee** (0–2)	Iglesias (19)	19,649	49–57	L2
107	July 29	Dodgers	9–1	**Gray** (10–7)	Maeda (7–8)		43,574	50–57	W1
108	July 30	Dodgers	4–9	Sadler (1–0)	**Freeland** (2–9)	Gonsolin (1)	45,300	50–58	L1
109	July 31	Dodgers	1–5	Kelly (5–3)	**Davis** (1–5)		42,025	50–59	L2

August: 9–19 (Home: 7–8; Away: 2–11 )

#	Date	Opponent	Score	Win	Loss	Save	Attendance	Record	Streak
110	August 2	Giants	5–4	**Díaz** (4–2)	Moronta (3–6)	**Oberg** (4)	40,672	51–59	W1
111	August 3	Giants	5–6	Coonrod (2–0)	**Estévez** (1–2)	Smith (27)	47,540	51–60	L1
112	August 4	Giants	6–2	**Freeland** (3–9)	Beede (3–6)		40,084	52–60	W1
113	August 6	@ Astros	6–11	Greinke (11–4)	**Gonzalez** (0–4)		43,243	52–61	L1
114	August 7	@ Astros	3–14	Cole (14–5)	**Lambert** (2–3)		35,566	52–62	L2
115	August 8	@ Padres	3–9	Strahm (5–8)	**Gray** (10–8)		27,806	52–63	L3
116	August 9	@ Padres	1–7	Quantrill (5–3)	**Freeland** (3–10)		27,882	52–64	L4
117	August 10	@ Padres	5–8	Muñoz (1–1)	**Díaz** (4–3)	Yates (33)	42,564	52–65	L5
118	August 11	@ Padres	8–3	**Márquez** (11–5)	Stammen (6–6)		28,930	53–65	W1
119	August 12	Diamondbacks	6–8	Kelly (8–12)	**Bettis** (1–6)	Bradley (4)	32,160	53–66	L1
120	August 13	Diamondbacks	3–9	Ginkel (1–0)	**Hoffman** (1–4)		31,815	53–67	L2
121	August 14	Diamondbacks	7–6	**Oberg** (6–1)	Bradley (3–5)		32,247	54–67	W1
122	August 16	Marlins	3–0	**Gray** (11–8)	Alcántara (4–11)	**Oberg** (5)	35,018	55–67	W2
123	August 17	Marlins	11–4	**Márquez** (12–5)	Noesí (0–3)		40,199	56–67	W3
124	August 18	Marlins	7–6 (10)	**Estévez** (2–2)	Brigham (2–2)		38,181	57–67	W4
125	August 19	@ Diamondbacks	3–5	López (2–5)	**Davis** (1–6)	Bradley (5)	15,443	57–68	L1
126	August 20	@ Diamondbacks	7–8	Young (5–3)	**Freeland** (3–11)	Bradley (6)	17,691	57–69	L2
127	August 21	@ Diamondbacks	7–2	**Melville** (1–0)	Leake (9–10)		17,707	58–69	W1
128	August 22	@ Cardinals	5–6	Leone (1–0)	**Almonte** (0–1)	Martínez (15)	36,465	58–70	L1
129	August 23	@ Cardinals	3–8	Flaherty (8–6)	**Lambert** (2–4)		40,829	58–71	L2
130	August 24	@ Cardinals	0–6	Hudson (13–6)	**Gonzalez** (0–5)		42,102	58–72	L3
131	August 25	@ Cardinals	4–11	Helsley (1–0)	**Senzatela** (8–8)		45,551	58–73	L4
132	August 26	Braves	3–1	**Díaz** (5–3)	Swarzak (3–4)		29,803	59–73	W1
133	August 27	Red Sox	6–10	Porcello (12–10)	**Garcia** (0–1)		44,101	59–74	L1
134	August 28	Red Sox	4–7	Rodríguez (16–5)	**Lambert** (2–5)	Workman (9)	40,801	59–75	L2
135	August 29	Pirates	8–11	Williams (7–6)	**Gonzalez** (0–6)	Vázquez (24)	33,408	59–76	L3
136	August 30	Pirates	4–9	Agrazal (4–3)	**Senzatela** (8–9)		27,789	59–77	L4
137	August 31	Pirates	4–11	Musgrove (9–12)	**Melville** (1–1)		37,293	59–78	L5

September: 12–13 (Home: 9–4; Away: 3–9 )

#	Date	Opponent	Score	Win	Loss	Save	Attendance	Record	Streak
138	September 1	Pirates	2–6	Brault (4–3)	**Hoffman** (1–5)	—	32,685	59–79	L6
139	September 2	@ Dodgers	9–16	Buehler (12–3)	**Lambert** (2–6)	Maeda (1)	45,910	59–80	L7
140	September 3	@ Dodgers	3–5	Ferguson (1–1)	**Shaw** (2–2)	Jansen (28)	52,231	59–81	L8
141	September 4	@ Dodgers	3–7	Kolarek (6–3)	**Senzatela** (8–10)		45,761	59–82	L9
142	September 6	@ Padres	3–2	**Melville** (2–1)	Lamet (2–4)	**Díaz** (1)	26,073	60–82	W1
143	September 7	@ Padres	0–3	Lucchesi (10–7)	**Hoffman** (1–6)	Yates (40)	29,709	60–83	L1
144	September 8	@ Padres	1–2 (10)	Stammen (8–7)	**Tinoco** (0–2)		26,834	60–84	L2
145	September 10	Cardinals	2–1	**Gonzalez** (1–6)	Wacha (6–7)	**Díaz** (2)	31,514	61–84	W1
146	September 11	Cardinals	2–1	**Senzatela** (9–10)	Hudson (15–7)	**Díaz** (3)	31,931	62–84	W2
147	September 12	Cardinals	3–10	Mikolas (9–13)	**Melville** (2–2)		27,618	62–85	L1
148	September 13	Padres	10–8	**Hoffman** (2–6)	Lucchesi (10–8)	**Díaz** (4)	31,654	63–85	W1
149	September 14	Padres	11–10	**Lambert** (3–6)	Lauer (8–9)	**Tinoco** (1)	47,370	64–85	W2
150	September 15	Padres	10–5	**Howard** (1–0)	Quantrill (6–8)		30,699	65–85	W3
151	September 16	Mets	9–4	**Senzatela** (10–10)	Matz (10–9)		28,505	66–85	W4
152	September 17	Mets	1–6	Stroman (9–13)	**Melville** (2–3)		33,118	66–86	L1
153	September 18	Mets	4–7	Lugo (7–4)	**Díaz** (5–4)		30,174	66–87	L2
154	September 20	@ Dodgers	5–12	Kershaw (15–5)	**Lambert** (3–7)		53,704	66–88	L3
155	September 21	@ Dodgers	4–2	**Gonzalez** (2–6)	Buehler (13–4)	**Díaz** (5)	50,705	67–88	W1
156	September 22	@ Dodgers	4–7	Ryu (13–5)	**Senzatela** (10–11)		47,948	67–89	L1
157	September 24	@ Giants	8–5 (16)	**Howard** (2–0)	Rodríguez (6–10)	**Shaw** (1)	27,870	68–89	W1
158	September 25	@ Giants	1–2	Smith (6–0)	**Johnson** (0–2)		29,175	68–90	L1
159	September 26	@ Giants	3–8	Coonrod (5–1)	**Tinoco** (0–3)		30,350	68–91	L2
160	September 27	Brewers	11–7	**Senzatela** (11–11)	Black (0–1)	—	44,087	69–91	W1
161	September 28	Brewers	3–2 (10)	**Díaz** (6–4)	Albers (8–6)	—	47,381	70–91	W2
162	September 29	Brewers	4–3 (13)	**Shaw** (3–2)	Faria (0–1)	—	36,771	71–91	W3

Legend: = Win = Loss = Postponement
Bold = Rockies team member

== Roster ==
2019 Colorado Rockies
Roster
Pitchers: 62 Yency Almonte; 44 Tyler Anderson; 35 Chad Bettis; 71 Wade Davis; 37 Jairo Díaz; 64 Phil Diehl; 38 Mike Dunn; 54 Carlos Estévez; 21 Kyle Freeland; 46 Rico Garcia; 50 Chi Chi Gonzalez; 55 Jon Gray; 30 Joe Harvey; 34 Jeff Hoffman; 61 Sam Howard; 63 D. J. Johnson; 23 Peter Lambert; 48 Germán Márquez; 51 Jake McGee; 38 Tim Melville; 59 Harrison Musgrave; 45 Scott Oberg; 18 Seung-hwan Oh; 18 Wes Parsons; 47 James Pazos; 52 Chris Rusin; 49 Antonio Senzatela; 29 Bryan Shaw; 32 Jesús Tinoco	Catchers: 25 Drew Butera; 22 Chris Iannetta; 58 Dom Nunez; 14 Tony Wolters; Infielders: 13 Yonder Alonso; 28 Nolan Arenado; 8 Josh Fuentes; 1 Garrett Hampson; 24 Ryan McMahon; 9 Daniel Murphy; 12 Mark Reynolds; 7 Brendan Rodgers; 27 Trevor Story; 4 Pat Valaika; Outfielders: 19 Charlie Blackmon; 56 Noel Cuevas; 26 David Dahl; 31 Yonathan Daza; 20 Ian Desmond; 43 Sam Hilliard; 15 Raimel Tapia	Manager: 10 Bud Black; Coaches: 39 Stu Cole (third base); 75 Kyle Cunningham (bullpen catcher); 36 Steve Foster (pitching); 53 Ron Gideon (first base); 40 Darren Holmes (bullpen); 16 Dave Magadan (hitting); 77 Aaron Muñoz (bullpen catcher); 11 Mike Redmond (bench); 41 Jeff Salazar (assistant hitting)

== Statistics ==
=== Batting ===
List does not include pitchers. Stats in bold are the team leaders.

Note: G = Games played; AB = At bats; R = Runs; H = Hits; 2B = Doubles; 3B = Triples; HR = Home runs; RBI = Runs batted in; BB = Walks; SO = Strikeouts; AVG = Batting average; OBP = On-base percentage; SLG = Slugging percentage; OPS = On Base + Slugging

Player	G	AB	R	H	2B	3B	HR	RBI	BB	SO	AVG	OBP	SLG	OPS
Trevor Story	145	**588**	111	173	38	5	35	85	58	**174**	.294	.363	.554	.917
Nolan Arenado	**155**	**588**	102	**185**	31	2	**41**	**118**	**62**	93	**.315**	**.379**	**.583**	**.962**
Charlie Blackmon	140	580	**112**	182	**42**	**7**	32	86	40	104	.314	.364	.576	.940
Ryan McMahon	141	480	70	120	22	1	24	83	56	160	.250	.329	.450	.779
Ian Desmond	140	443	64	113	31	4	20	65	34	119	.255	.310	.479	.788
Daniel Murphy	132	438	56	122	35	1	13	78	32	74	.279	.328	.452	.780
Raimel Tapia	138	426	54	117	23	5	9	44	21	100	.275	.309	.415	.724
David Dahl	100	374	67	113	28	5	15	61	28	110	.302	.353	.524	.877
Tony Wolters	121	359	42	94	17	2	1	42	36	68	.262	.337	.329	.666
Garrett Hampson	105	299	40	74	9	4	8	27	24	88	.247	.302	.385	.686
Chris Iannetta	52	144	20	32	10	0	6	21	18	54	.222	.311	.417	.728
Mark Reynolds	78	135	13	23	7	0	4	20	22	57	.170	.290	.311	.601
Yonathan Daza	44	97	7	20	1	1	0	3	7	21	.206	.257	.237	.494
Pat Valaika	40	79	11	15	5	1	1	4	7	34	.190	.256	.316	.572
Sam Hilliard	27	77	13	21	4	2	7	13	9	23	.273	.356	.649	1.006
Brendan Rodgers	25	76	8	17	2	0	0	7	4	27	.224	.272	.250	.522
Yonder Alonso	54	73	11	19	7	0	3	10	10	17	.260	.357	.479	.837
Joshua Fuentes	24	55	8	12	1	0	3	7	1	20	.218	.232	.400	.632
Drew Butera	16	43	6	7	3	0	0	3	4	14	.163	.229	.233	.462
Dom Núñez	16	39	4	7	3	0	2	4	3	17	.179	.233	.410	.643
Noel Cuevas	1	2	0	0	0	0	0	0	0	0	.000	.000	.000	.000
Non-Pitcher Totals	162	5395	819	1466	319	40	224	781	476	1374	.272	.333	.470	.803
**Team totals**	**162**	**5660**	**835**	**1502**	**323**	**41**	**224**	**803**	**489**	**1503**	**.265**	**.326**	**.456**	**.782**

=== Pitching ===
List does not include position players. Stats in bold are the team leaders.

Note: W = Wins; L = Losses; ERA = Earned run average; G = Games pitched; GS = Games started; SV = Saves; IP = Innings pitched; R = Runs allowed; ER = Earned runs allowed; BB = Walks allowed; K = Strikeouts

Player	W	L	ERA	G	GS	SV	IP	H	R	ER	BB	K
Germán Márquez	**12**	5	**4.76**	28	**28**	0	**174.0**	**174**	96	92	35	**175**
Jon Gray	11	8	3.84	26	25	0	150.0	147	70	64	56	150
Antonio Senzatela	11	**11**	6.71	25	25	0	124.2	161	**99**	**93**	**57**	76
Kyle Freeland	3	**11**	6.73	22	22	0	104.1	126	85	78	39	79
Peter Lambert	3	7	7.25	19	19	0	89.1	119	74	72	36	57
Bryan Shaw	3	2	5.38	70	0	1	72.0	69	44	43	29	58
Carlos Estévez	2	2	3.75	**71**	0	0	72.0	70	34	30	23	81
Jeff Hoffman	2	6	6.56	15	15	0	70.0	77	51	51	34	68
Chad Bettis	1	6	6.08	39	3	1	63.2	78	47	43	21	42
Chi Chi Gonzalez	2	6	5.29	14	12	0	63.0	59	39	37	33	46
Jairo Díaz	6	4	4.53	56	0	5	57.2	56	34	29	19	63
Scott Oberg	6	1	2.25	49	0	5	56.0	39	18	14	23	58
Wade Davis	1	6	8.65	50	0	**15**	42.2	51	42	41	29	42
Jake McGee	0	2	4.35	45	0	0	41.1	47	25	20	11	35
Jesús Tinoco	0	3	4.75	24	0	1	36.0	36	23	19	22	28
Yency Almonte	0	1	5.56	28	0	0	34.0	39	22	21	14	29
Tim Melville	2	3	4.86	7	7	0	33.1	34	18	18	14	24
DJ Johnson	0	2	5.04	28	0	0	25.0	23	14	14	19	24
Tyler Anderson	0	3	11.76	5	5	0	20.2	33	27	27	11	23
Wes Parsons	0	0	6.98	15	0	0	19.1	21	17	15	16	14
Sam Howard	2	0	6.63	20	0	0	19.0	21	16	14	10	23
Seung-hwan Oh	3	1	9.33	21	0	0	18.1	29	19	19	6	16
Mike Dunn	1	0	7.13	28	0	0	17.2	17	14	14	6	15
James Pazos	0	0	1.74	12	0	0	10.1	7	2	2	4	10
Harrison Musgrave	0	0	3.60	10	0	0	10.0	9	4	4	7	12
Joe Harvey	0	0	5.63	9	0	0	8.0	7	5	5	6	6
Phil Diehl	0	0	7.36	10	0	0	7.1	10	6	6	2	8
Rico Garcia	0	1	10.50	2	1	0	6.0	9	7	7	5	2
Chris Rusin	0	0	36.00	2	0	0	1.0	5	4	4	1	0
**Team totals**	**71**	**91**	**5.56**	**162**	**162**	**28**	**1448.2**	**1576**	**958**	**895**	**589**	**1264**

== Farm system ==
Level	Team	League	Manager
AAA	Albuquerque Isotopes	Pacific Coast League	Glenallen Hill
AA	Hartford Yard Goats	Eastern League	Warren Schaeffer
A-Advanced	Lancaster JetHawks	California League	Scott Little
A	Asheville Tourists	South Atlantic League	Robinson Cancel
A-Short Season	Boise Hawks	Northwest League	Steve Soliz
Rookie	Grand Junction Rockies	Pioneer League	Jake Opitz

Records
Preceded by 2018	Colorado Rockies seasons 2019	Succeeded by 2020
