= Knuckle curve =

Baseball pitch

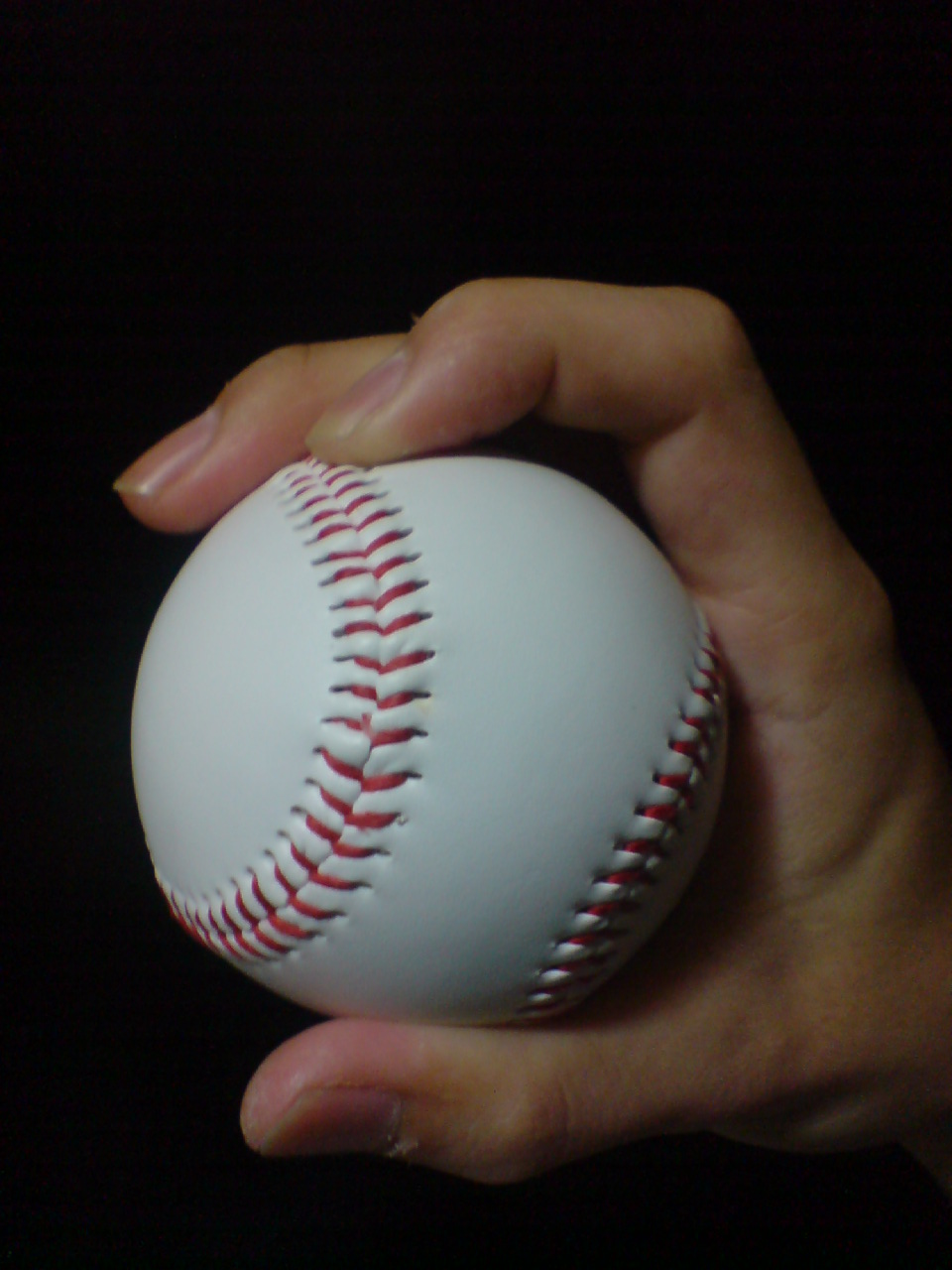
A common grip used for a knuckle curve

In Major League history, the term knuckle curve or knuckle curveball has been used to describe three different pitches. All are unrelated to the similar sounding knuckleball.

The first, more modern and commonly used pitch called the knuckle curve is really a standard curveball, thrown with one or more of the index or middle fingers bent. According to practitioners, this gives them a better grip on the ball and allows for tighter spin and greater movement. In all other respects, this knuckle curve is identical to the standard curveball. This version of the knuckle curve was used by Major League pitchers Phil Hughes and Brad Peacock in the 2010s. Mike Mussina was well known for his incorporation of the pitch into his repertoire. Justin Verlander formerly threw a knuckle curve but was forced to abandon the pitch due to problems with blisters. This knuckle curve is usually called the spike curve by MLB players and coaches because the pitch is nothing like a knuckleball.

The second type of knuckle curve is a breaking ball that is thrown with a grip similar to the knuckleball. Unlike a knuckleball, which spins very little, a knuckle curve spins like a normal curveball because the pitcher's index and middle fingers push the top of the ball into a downward curve at the moment of release. Since only two fingers produce the spin, however, a knuckle curve does not spin as fast as a curveball, meaning the break is less sharp and less predictable. Because this knuckle curve can be thrown with the same general motion as a fastball, it is more deceptive than a normal curveball. This kind of knuckle curve is rare. It is easier to control than a standard knuckleball, but still difficult to master. The most famous practitioners of this type of knuckle curve are Burt Hooton, who pitched for the Chicago Cubs and the Los Angeles Dodgers from the mid-1970s to mid-1980s, and former reliever Jason Isringhausen.

The third type of knuckle curve was thrown by Dave Stenhouse in the 1960s. Stenhouse's knuckle curve was thrown like a fastball but with a knuckleball grip. Stenhouse discovered that this pitch had excellent movement, and when he came to the majors, he used it as a breaking pitch. This pitch may have been the same as the knuckleball thrown by Jesse Haines and Freddie Fitzsimmons. The pitch would be perfected by Chicago White Sox legend Hoyt Wilhelm during the later stages of his career, after flirting with it for most of his time in the majors.

== Notable knuckle curve pitchers ==
- Cody Allen
- Matt Anderson
- Matt Barnes
- Dellin Betances
- Shane Bieber
- Archie Bradley
- Mike Bolsinger
- Walker Buehler
- A. J. Burnett
- Alex Cobb
- Gerrit Cole
- Wade Davis
- Tyler Duffey
- Dillon Gee
- Zack Godley
- Dan Haren
- Burt Hooton
- J. P. Howell
- Phil Hughes
- Jason Isringhausen
- Joe Kelly
- Craig Kimbrel
- German Marquez
- Vin Mazzaro
- Lance McCullers Jr.
- James McDonald
- Mark Melancon
- Mike Minor
- Mike Mussina
- Aaron Nola
- Bobby Parnell
- James Paxton
- Brad Peacock
- Nick Pivetta
- Drew Pomeranz
- David Robertson
- Jonathan Sánchez
- Dave Stenhouse
- Ross Stripling
- Chris Tillman
- Hoyt Wilhelm
- Brandon Workman
