= Taylor Clarke =

American baseball player (born 1993)

Free agent
- Pitcher
- Born: May 13, 1993 (age 33); Ashburn, Virginia, U.S.
- Bats: Right Throws: Right

MLB debut
- April 20, 2019, for the Arizona Diamondbacks

MLB statistics (through 2026 season)
- Win–loss record: 18–20
- Earned run average: 4.42
- Strikeouts: 349
- Stats at Baseball Reference

Teams
- Arizona Diamondbacks (2019–2021); Kansas City Royals (2022–2023, 2025); Arizona Diamondbacks (2026)

Taylor James Clarke (born May 13, 1993) is an American professional baseball pitcher who is a free agent. He has played in Major League Baseball (MLB) for the Kansas City Royals and Arizona Diamondbacks.

== Amateur career ==
Clarke attended Broad Run High School in Ashburn, Virginia, where he played baseball, basketball and golf. He began his college career at Towson University. In January 2013, Clarke tore the ulnar collateral ligament of his pitching elbow, and underwent Tommy John surgery. He learned in March that Towson planned on ending their college baseball program, and transferred to the College of Charleston.

== Professional career ==
=== Arizona Diamondbacks ===
The Arizona Diamondbacks selected Clarke in the third round of the 2015 Major League Baseball draft. He signed with the Diamondbacks and spent his professional season with the Hillsboro Hops of the Low–A Northwest League, where he did not give up a run in 21 innings pitched. Clarke spent the 2016 season with the Single–A Kane County Cougars, High–A Visalia Rawhide, and the Double–A Mobile BayBears, where he posted a combined 12–9 record and 3.31 ERA in 149.1 innings pitched with the three clubs. In 2017, he played for both the Double–A Jackson Generals and the Triple–A Reno Aces, pitching to a combined 12–9 record and 3.35 ERA in 145 total innings between both teams. He spent all of 2018 with Triple–A Reno going 13–8 with a 4.03 ERA.

On November 20, 2018, the Diamondbacks added Clarke to their 40-man roster to protect him from the Rule 5 draft. He opened the 2019 season with Reno. On April 20, he was recalled to the major league roster for the first time. He made his major league debut that afternoon versus the Chicago Cubs, recording three scoreless innings in relief and earning a save. His first big-league win came on May 25 at Oracle Park against the San Francisco Giants. He finished the season with a record of 5–5 in 23 games (15 starts).

Clarke joined a small group of Major League pitchers who picked up a win, loss and save in their first three appearances. In 2020, Clarke pitched to a 4.36 ERA with 40 strikeouts in 43.1 innings pitched across 12 appearances (5 starts).

Clarke made 43 appearances out of the bullpen for the Diamondbacks in 2021, registering a 4.98 ERA with 39 strikeouts across 43 1/3 innings pitched. On November 30, 2021, he was non-tendered by the Diamondbacks, making him a free agent.

=== Kansas City Royals ===
On December 1, 2021, Clarke signed a major league contract with the Kansas City Royals. In 47 appearances for the Royals in 2022, he registered a 4.04 ERA with 48 strikeouts and 3 saves across 49.0 innings of work.

Clarke made 58 appearances for Kansas City in 2023, posting a 5.95 ERA with 65 strikeouts and 3 saves across 59.0 innings pitched.

=== Milwaukee Brewers ===
On December 14, 2023, the Royals traded Clarke to the Milwaukee Brewers in exchange for minor leaguers Cam Devanney and Ryan Brady. On March 30, 2024, Clarke underwent surgery to repair a torn meniscus in his right knee, ruling him out for 6–8 weeks. He was designated for assignment following the acquisition of Aaron Civale on July 3. Clarke cleared waivers and was sent outright to the Triple–A Nashville Sounds on July 7. He elected free agency on October 9.

=== Kansas City Royals (second stint) ===
On December 12, 2024, Clarke signed a minor league contract with the Kansas City Royals. He began the 2025 season with the Triple-A Omaha Storm Chasers, recording a 4.40 ERA with nine strikeouts over 10 games. On May 1, 2025, the Royals selected Clarke's contract, adding him to their active roster. He made 51 appearances during the regular season, compiling a 1-1 record and 3.25 ERA with 44 strikeouts and one save across 55 1/3 innings pitched. On November 21, Clarke was non-tendered by Kansas City and became a free agent.

=== Arizona Diamondbacks (second stint) ===
On January 15, 2026, Clarke signed a one-year, $1.55 million contract with the Arizona Diamondbacks.

== Personal life ==
Clarke was born with paralysis of the muscles on the right side of his face.

Clarke and his wife, also named Taylor, have twin sons together.
