= Wade Davis (baseball) =

American baseball player (born 1985)

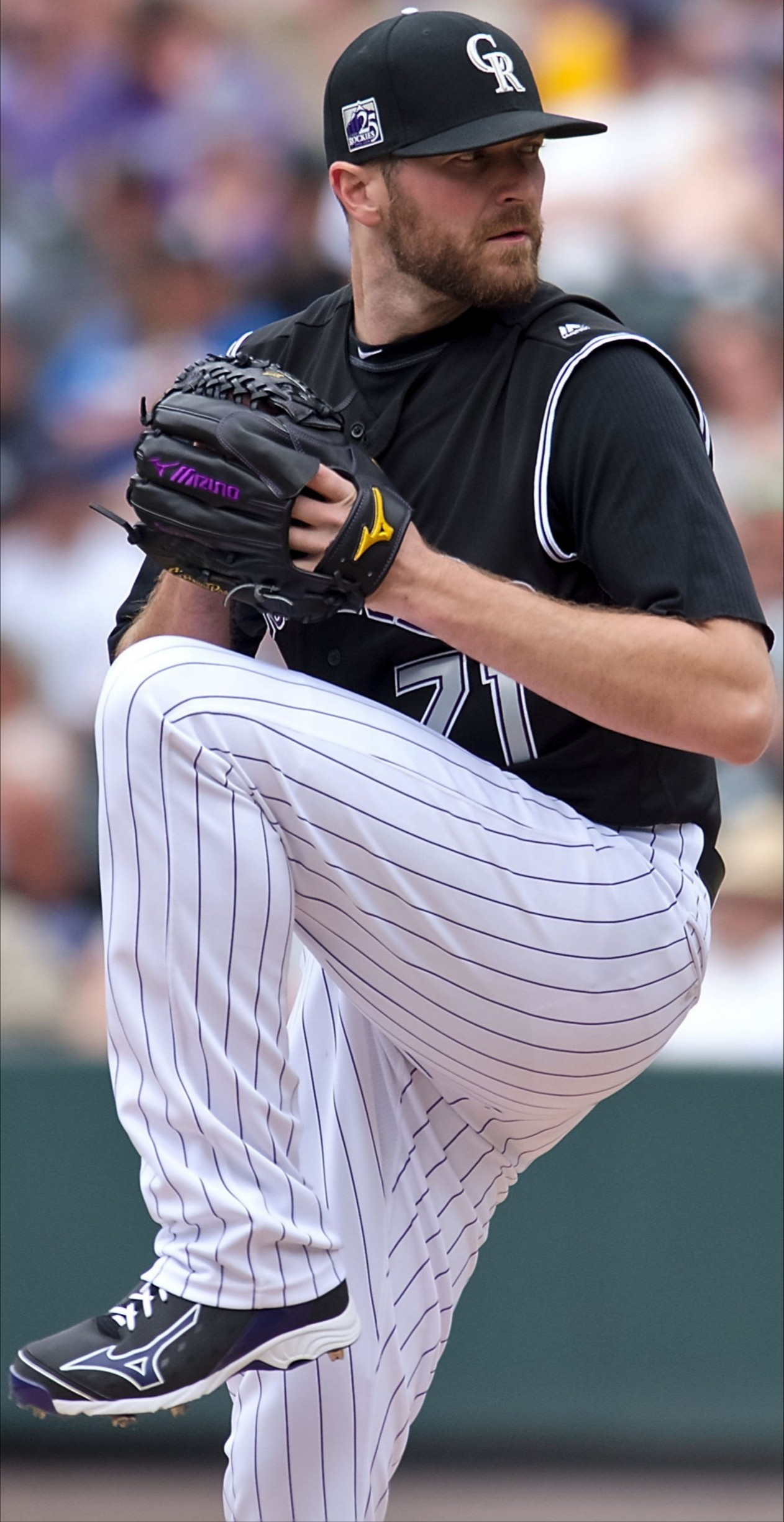
- Davis with the Colorado Rockies in 2018
- Pitcher
- Born: September 7, 1985 (age 41); Lake Wales, Florida, U.S.
- Batted: Right Threw: Right

MLB debut
- September 6, 2009, for the Tampa Bay Rays

Last MLB appearance
- September 11, 2021, for the Kansas City Royals

MLB statistics
- Win–loss record: 63–55
- Earned run average: 3.94
- Strikeouts: 929
- Saves: 141
- Stats at Baseball Reference

Teams
- Tampa Bay Rays (2009–2012); Kansas City Royals (2013–2016); Chicago Cubs (2017); Colorado Rockies (2018–2020); Kansas City Royals (2021)

Career highlights and awards
- 3× All-Star (2015–2017); World Series champion (2015); NL saves leader (2018)

Wade Allen Davis (born September 7, 1985) is an American former professional baseball pitcher. He has played in Major League Baseball (MLB) for the Tampa Bay Rays, Kansas City Royals, Chicago Cubs, and Colorado Rockies. Davis is a three-time MLB All-Star. He was a member of the Royals' 2015 World Series-winning team, and earned the Babe Ruth Award for his performance in the 2015 MLB playoffs.

== Early life ==
Born and raised in the small town of Lake Wales, Florida, Davis attended Lake Wales High School. After high school, Davis originally committed to attend the University of Florida, but later turned down the offer to play professional baseball.

== Professional career ==
=== Tampa Bay Rays ===
==== Draft and minors ====
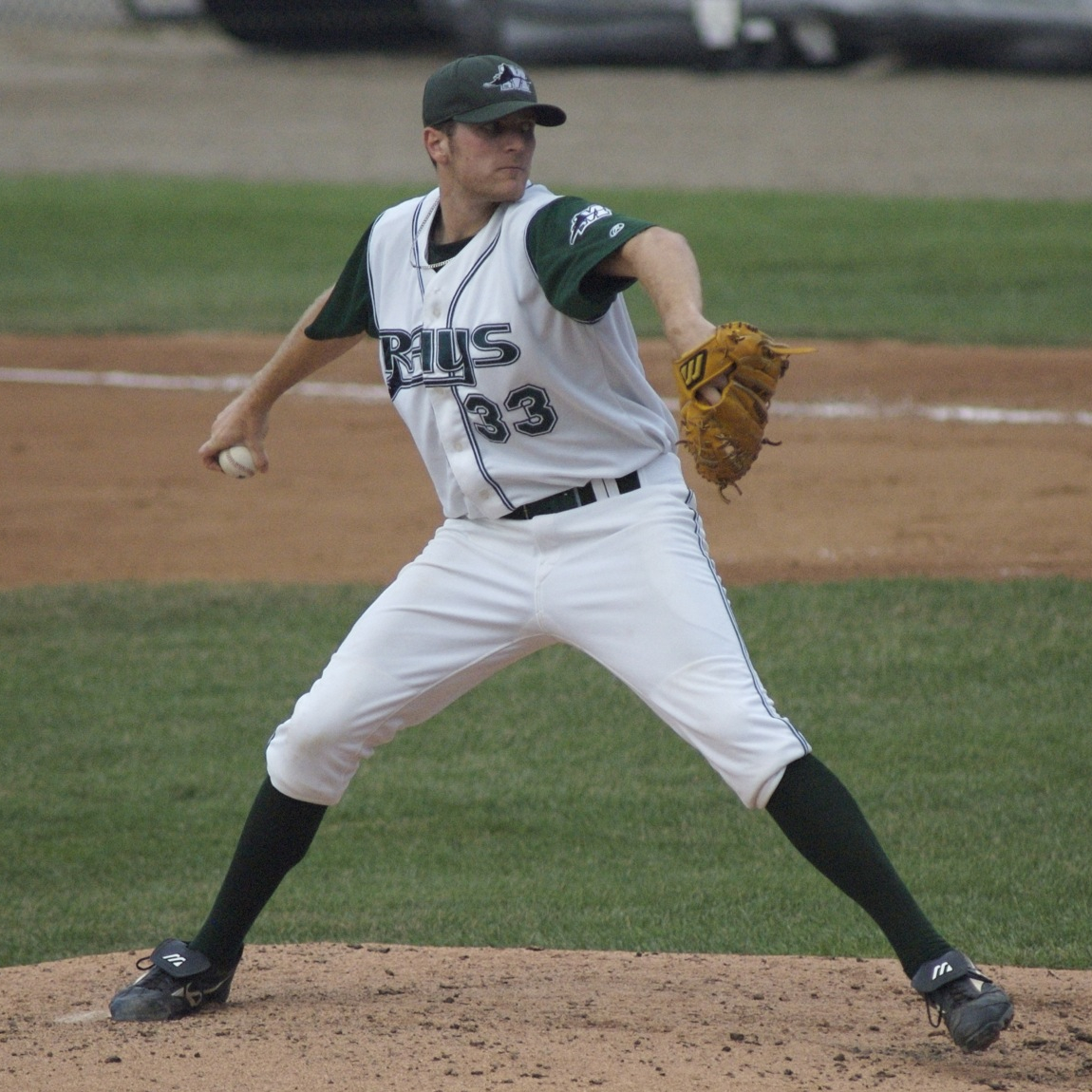
Davis pitching for the Southwest Michigan Devil Rays in 2006

The Tampa Bay Devil Rays selected Davis in the third round, with the 75th overall selection, of the 2004 MLB draft. In the minors, he sported a 93–94 mph fastball, and a spike curveball. Davis has expanded his repertoire to include a two-seam fastball, a slider, and a changeup.

==== 2009 ====
Davis made his major league debut on September 6, 2009, against the Detroit Tigers. He earned a no-decision after pitching seven innings, allowing one run, with nine strikeouts.

==== 2010 ====
Davis was the July 2010 AL Rookie Pitcher of the Month, after posting a 4–0 record with a 3.03 ERA in five starts.

He was named a starting pitcher on Baseball America's 2010 All-Rookie Team. The Tampa Bay chapter of the Baseball Writers' Association of America also named Davis the Most Outstanding Rookie of the Tampa Bay Rays for the 2010 season. He came in 4th in the voting for 2010 AL Rookie of the Year.

==== 2011–2012 ====
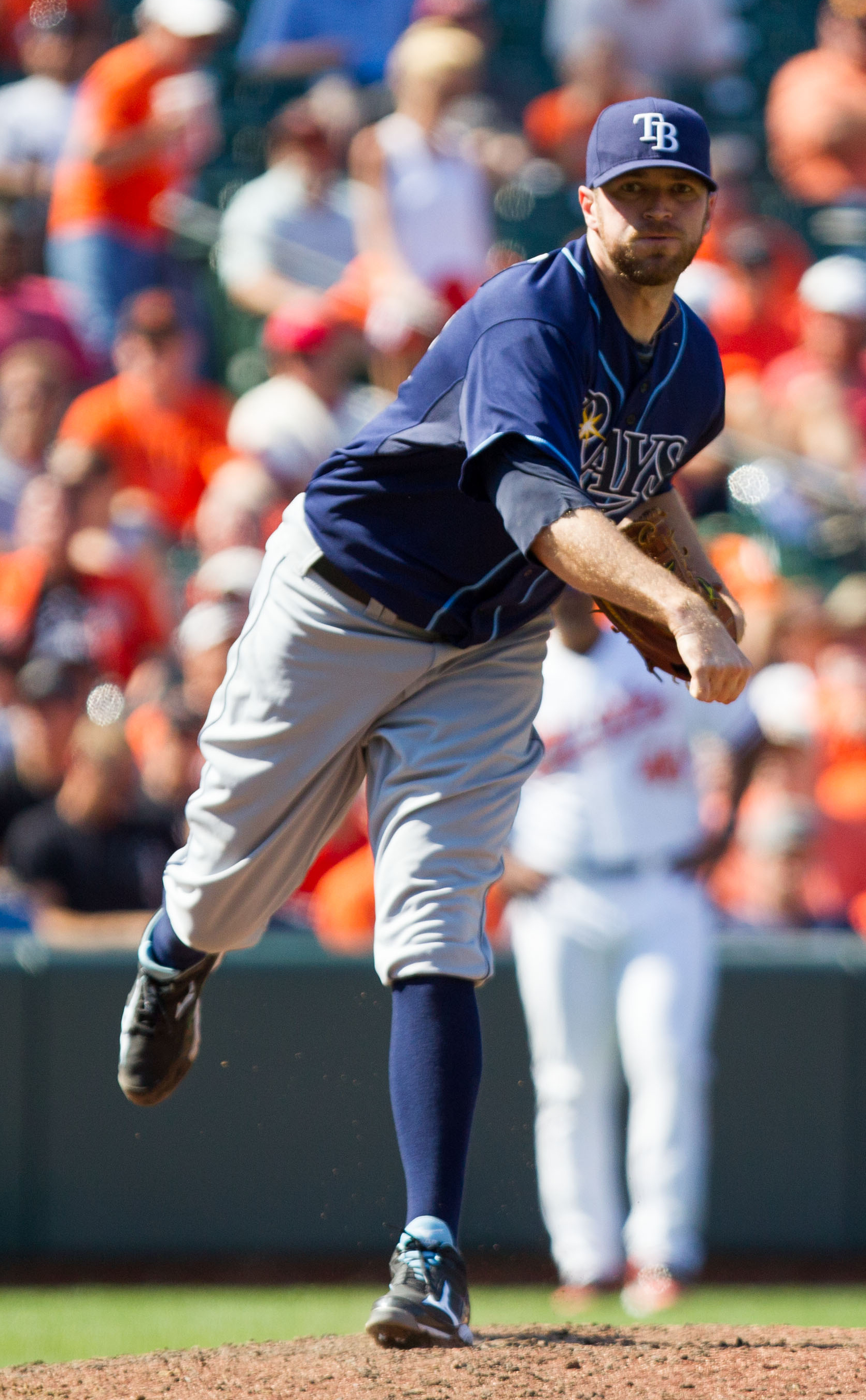
Davis pitching for the Tampa Bay Rays in 2012

After two years in the Rays' starting rotation, Davis spent 2012 coming out of the Rays' bullpen and had a strong season.

=== Kansas City Royals ===
On December 9, 2012, Davis was traded to the Kansas City Royals (along with James Shields and Elliot Johnson) in exchange for Wil Myers, Jake Odorizzi, Mike Montgomery and Patrick Leonard.

==== 2013 ====
Davis spent most of 2013 in the Royals' rotation and compiled a 6–10 record through the end of August. He moved to the bullpen for September 2013 and remained in the bullpen through 2014.

==== 2014 ====
In 2014, Davis posted one of the most dominant seasons ever by a reliever. From June 27 to September 15, Davis did not give up a run. On September 15, his ERA was an astonishing 0.69. On September 22, 2014, Davis struck out Yan Gomes for his 104th strikeout of the season, breaking the Royals record for most strikeouts by a relief pitcher, which was 103 and had been shared by Jim York (1971) and Greg Holland (2013). Davis finished the regular season with a 9–2 record, a 1.00 ERA and an AL-best 33 holds. He struck out 109 batters and walked 23 in 72 innings, and did not give up a home run. This dominance continued through the postseason, with Davis posting a 2–0 record, 0.63 ERA, and 20 strikeouts and two walks in 14 1/3 innings.

==== 2015 ====
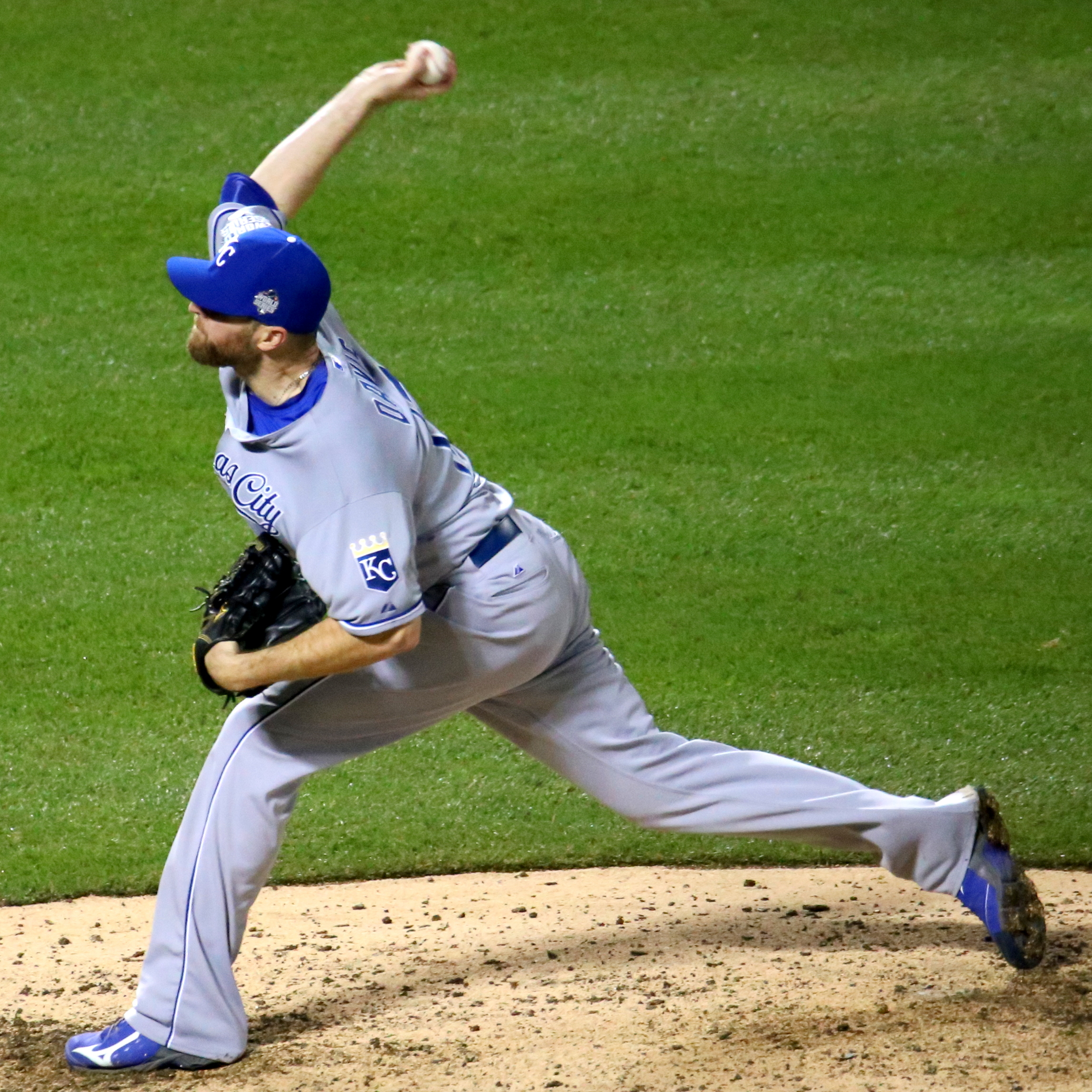
Davis pitching for the Kansas City Royals in the 2015 World Series.

In 2015, Davis continued his dominance in the bullpen, pitching almost exclusively in the 8th inning, much like 2014. On August 1, Davis' homerless streak ended at 125 2/3 innings, giving up a home run to the Blue Jays' José Bautista. His streak was the second longest in Royals history, and the longest such streak by a reliever. On September 22, Davis was selected by manager Ned Yost as the Royals' new closer, as the Royals announced that Greg Holland was done for the year and possibly all of 2016 due to pending Tommy John surgery. On October 23, Davis forced Blue Jays slugger and 2015 American League MVP Josh Donaldson to ground out to Mike Moustakas at third base, which was the final out to secure the Royals' second consecutive American League Championship Series title. Davis later recorded the final three outs of the 2015 World Series, as the Royals defeated the New York Mets in five games.

In the 2015 MLB postseason, Davis went 1-0 and earned four saves in four opportunities. He struck out 18 batters while allowing no earned runs over 10 2/3 innings pitched. This performance earned him the 2015 Babe Ruth Award, recognizing Davis as the most valuable player in the MLB postseason.

==== 2016 ====
On July 5, Davis was placed on the 15-day disabled list due to a right forearm strain. On November 4, 2016, the Royals picked up Davis's option for the 2017 season.

=== Chicago Cubs ===
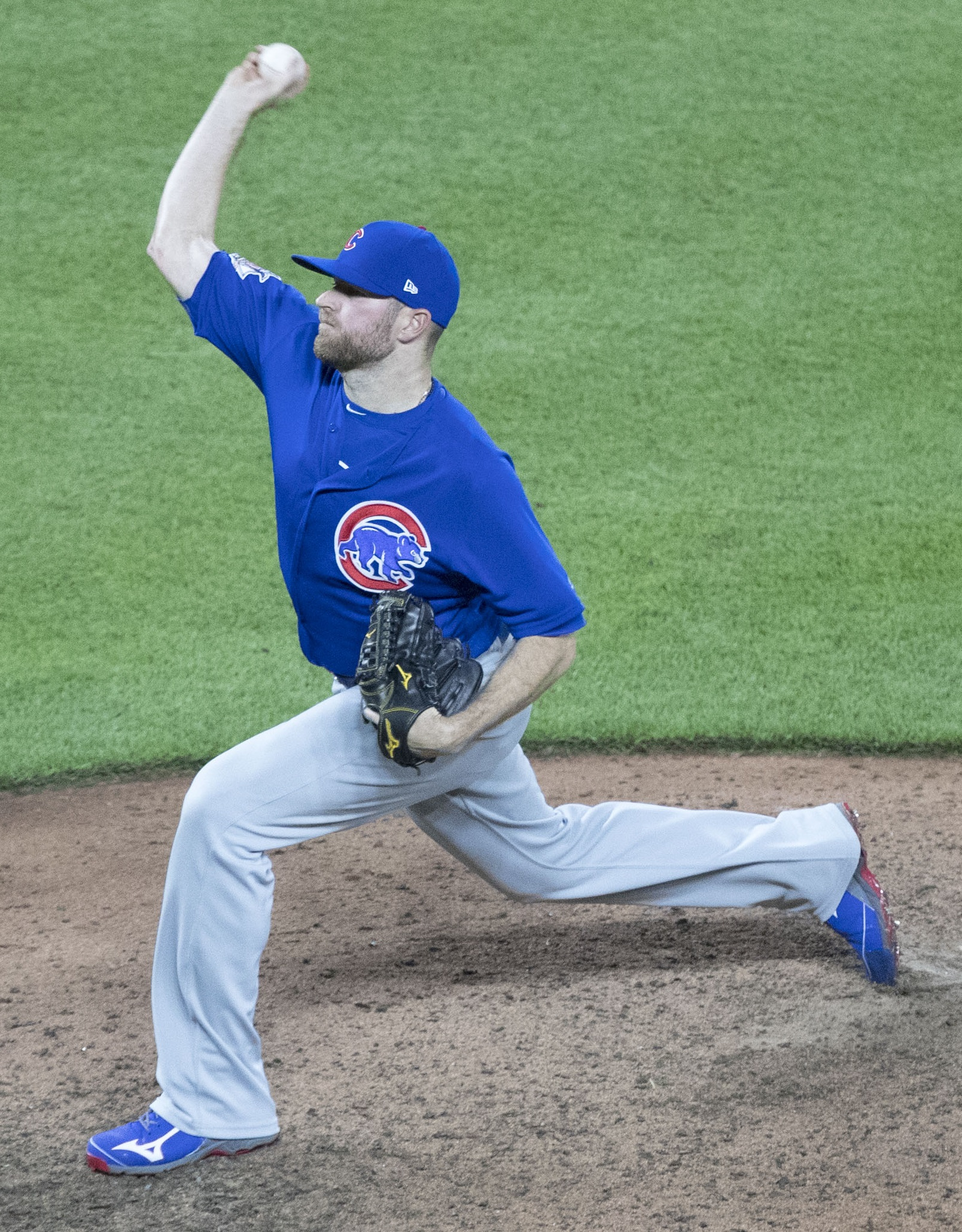
Davis pitching for the Chicago Cubs in 2017

On December 7, 2016, the Royals traded Davis to the Chicago Cubs for Jorge Soler. Davis was selected as the only Cub representative to the 2017 Major League Baseball All-Star Game. He gave up a game-winning tenth inning home run to Robinson Canó.

On August 29, 2017, Davis set the Chicago Cubs franchise record with his 27th consecutive save.

In Game 5 of the 2017 National League Division Series, he tied a Division Series record with 3 saves which tied Aroldis Chapman. But he tied a record by getting one in each of his 3 opportunities; matching Dennis Eckersley's feat in the 1996 National League Division Series.

=== Colorado Rockies ===
Davis signed a three-year, $52 million contract with the Colorado Rockies on December 29, 2017.

==== 2018 ====
In his first season in Colorado, Davis led the NL in saves with 43. He ended the season with a 4.13 ERA, his highest ERA since 2013. He struck out 78 batters in 65 1/3 innings.

==== 2019 ====
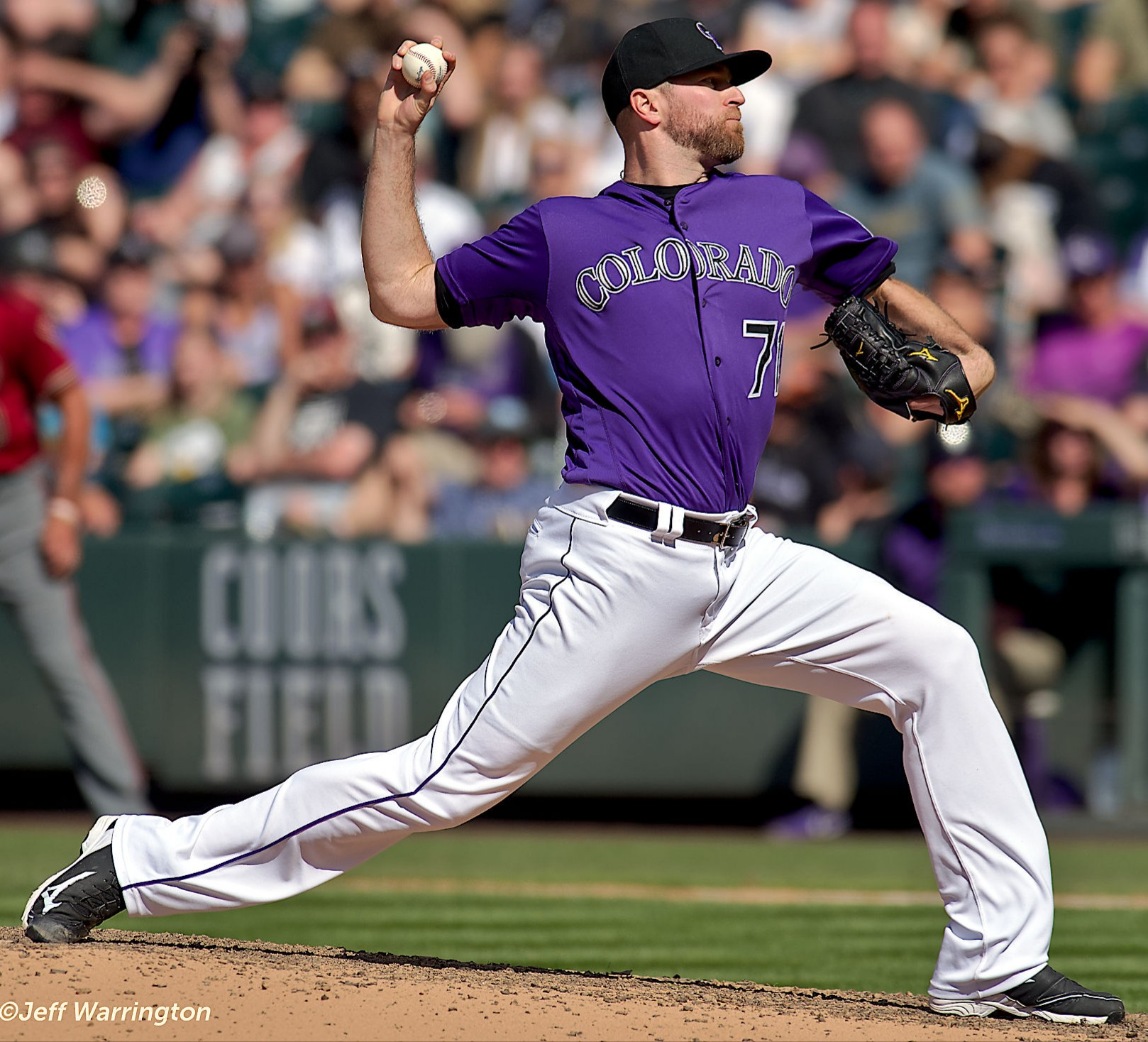
Davis pitching for the Colorado Rockies in 2019

He was placed on the disabled list on May 22, 2019, with a left oblique injury. He was removed from the closer role on August 2. At the end of the season, Davis put out the worst season of his career, posting a 8.65 ERA in 50 games. In 42 1/3 innings, he struck out 42 batters while inducing 29 walks.

On December 21, 2019, he was named as one of the two closers for All-Decade second team of 2010's with Kenley Jansen.

==== 2020 ====
Davis began the shortened season as the Rockies closer, but after blowing a save in his 3rd appearance, he was placed on the 10-day injured list with a right shoulder strain. After being activated from the IL on September 12th, Davis surrendered 5 runs in 1.2 innings over 2 appearances. On September 19, 2020, Davis was designated for assignment by the Rockies. He had allowed 10 runs in under 5 innings. Davis was released by the Rockies on September 21.

=== Kansas City Royals (second stint) ===
On January 20, 2021, Davis signed a minor league contract with the Kansas City Royals organization. On March 28, 2021, Davis was selected to the 40-man roster. Davis pitched in 40 games for the Royals in 2021, going 0–3 with a 6.75 ERA and 38 strikeouts. He became a free agent following the season.

On November 24, 2021, Davis announced his retirement.

== Pitch selection ==
As a starter, Davis threw five pitches (four-seam fastball, cut fastball, curveball, slider and changeup). As a relief pitcher, he has relied primarily on three pitches: a four-seam fastball in the 95–98 MPH range (topping out at 99 MPH), a cut fastball that averages 92–93 MPH, and a knuckle curve in the mid-80s that he started throwing in 2013.

== Personal life ==
Davis is the second-cousin of former Major League Baseball player Jody Davis. Wade Davis married long-time girlfriend, Katelyn Casey, in November 2009 in her hometown of Marlboro, New York. The couple has three children and three dogs.

The couple run a non-profit organization called "Full Kount", which benefits children age 18 and younger who use sports as a positive influence in their lives.
