= Tim Melville =

American baseball player (born 1989)

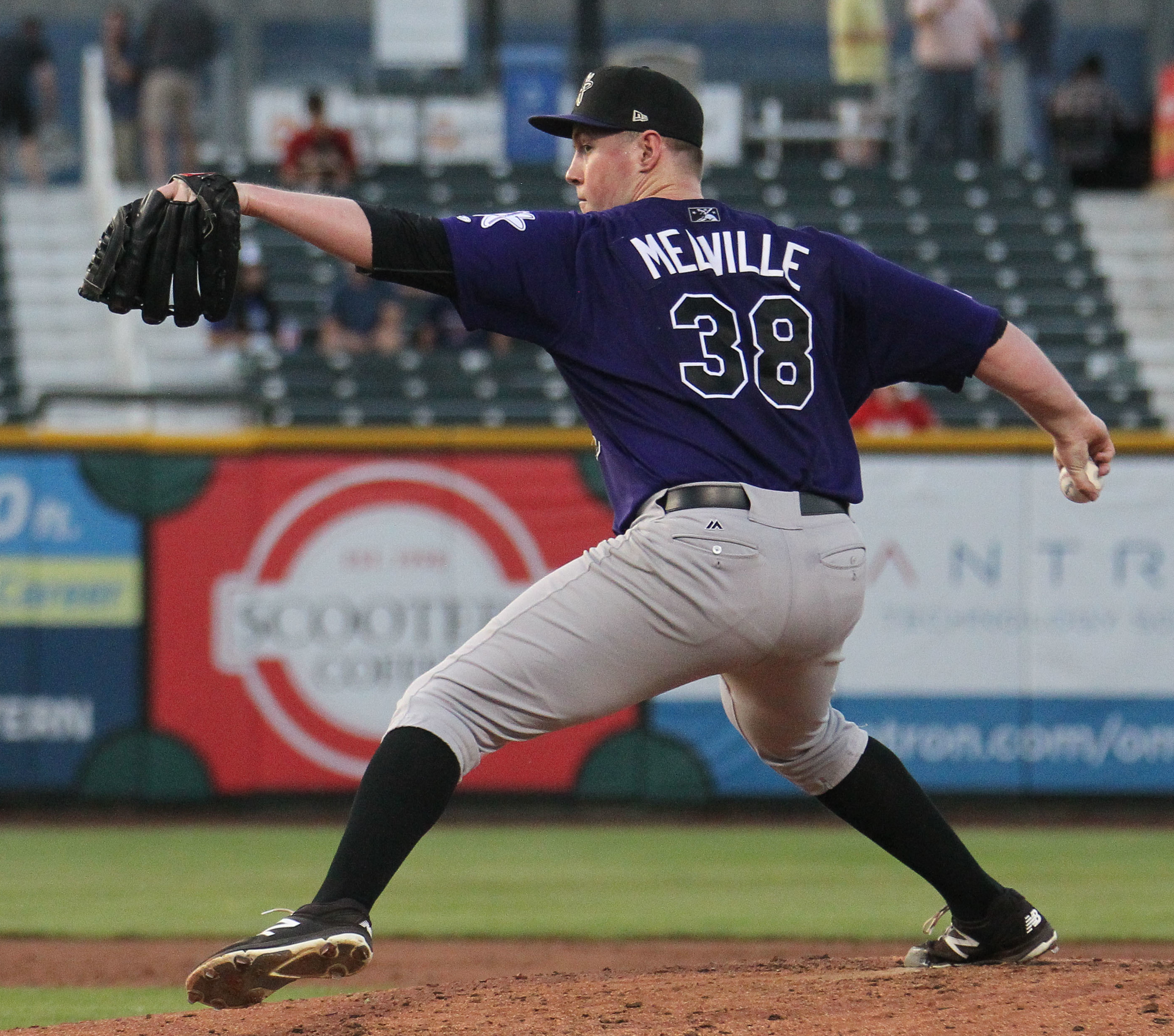
- Melville with the Albuquerque Isotopes in 2019

Free agent
- Pitcher
- Born: October 9, 1989 (age 36); Alexandria, Virginia, U.S.
- Bats: Right Throws: Right

Professional debut
- MLB: April 10, 2016, for the Cincinnati Reds
- CPBL: August 23, 2020, for the Uni-President Lions

MLB statistics (through 2019 season)
- Win–loss record: 2–5
- Earned run average: 6.75
- Strikeouts: 39

CPBL statistics (through 2023 season)
- Win–loss record: 12–12
- Earned run average: 3.84
- Strikeouts: 144
- Stats at Baseball Reference

Teams
- Cincinnati Reds (2016); Minnesota Twins (2017); San Diego Padres (2017); Colorado Rockies (2019); Uni-President Lions (2020–2021); Wei Chuan Dragons (2023)

Career highlights and awards
- CPBL: Taiwan Series champion (2020); Pitched a no-hitter on April 2, 2021

Timothy Macgill Melville (born October 9, 1989) is an American professional baseball pitcher who is a free agent. He has previously played in Major League Baseball (MLB) for the Cincinnati Reds, Minnesota Twins, San Diego Padres, and Colorado Rockies. Melville has also played in the Chinese Professional Baseball League (CPBL) for the Uni-President Lions and Wei Chuan Dragons.

== Career ==
Melville attended Wentzville Holt High School in Wentzville, Missouri. He played for the school's baseball team as a pitcher. In 2007, his junior year, he threw a perfect game. He pitched to a 10–1 win–loss record and a 0.89 earned run average (ERA) as a junior, and was named the Aflac National Player of the Year. He pitched to an 8–1 win–loss record and a 2.56 ERA in his senior year, while recording 89 strikeouts in 57 innings pitched. He committed to attend the University of North Carolina at Chapel Hill (UNC) to play for the North Carolina Tar Heels on a college baseball scholarship.

=== Kansas City Royals ===
Baseball America ranked Melville as the best high school player available in the 2008 Major League Baseball draft. Because of the commitment to UNC, Melville fell out of the first round in the draft. The Kansas City Royals selected him in the fourth round, with the 115th overall selection, and signed him to a contract with a $1.25 million signing bonus.

Melville began his professional career with the Burlington Bees of the Single–A Midwest League in 2009, pitching to a 7–7 win–loss record and a 3.79 ERA. He was promoted to the Wilmington Blue Rocks of the High–A Carolina League in 2010, where he struggled, pitching to a 2–12 win–loss record and a 4.97 ERA. He returned to Wilmington in 2011, and compiled an 11–10 record with a 4.32 ERA. Melville required Tommy John surgery in 2012. In 2014, Melville pitched for the Northwest Arkansas Naturals of the Double–A Texas League, but struggled with a 2–11 win–loss record, a 5.50 ERA, while allowing 68 walks in 129 1/3 innings.

=== Detroit Tigers ===
On November 19, 2014, Melville signed a minor league contract with the Detroit Tigers organization, and played for the Toledo Mud Hens of the Triple–A International League. He became a free agent following the season.

=== Cincinnati Reds ===
On November 25, 2015, Melville signed a minor league contract with the Cincinnati Reds. The Reds considered adding Melville to their Opening Day starting rotation, but instead chose Robert Stephenson, who was already on the Reds' 40-man roster. Melville was assigned to the Triple–A Louisville Bats of the International League.

On April 8, the Reds announced Melville would start in the series finale against the Pittsburgh Pirates, in place of Anthony DeSclafani, on April 10. The start marked Melville's MLB debut. He threw 4 innings, giving up 1 run in a no-decision vs. Pittsburgh. Melville was designated for assignment by the Reds on April 22. After clearing waivers on April 24, he spent the remainder of the year with Louisville and the Double–A Pensacola Blue Wahoos, logging a combined 4.85 ERA with 59 strikeouts across 38 appearances out of the bullpen. Melville elected free agency following the season on November 7.

=== Long Island Ducks ===
On April 6, 2017, Melville signed with the Long Island Ducks of the Atlantic League of Professional Baseball.

=== Minnesota Twins ===
On June 12, 2017, the Minnesota Twins signed him to a minor league contract, assigning him to the Triple-A Rochester Red Wings. After allowing 5 runs (4 earned) to the Chicago White Sox, Melville was designated for assignment by the Twins to make room for John Curtiss on the roster on August 22.

=== San Diego Padres ===
On August 26, 2017, Melville was claimed off waivers by the San Diego Padres. He made only two appearances for the Padres, allowing three runs (two earned) on three hits with three strikeouts. On November 6, Melville was removed from the 40–man roster and sent outright to the Triple–A El Paso Chihuahuas. However, Melville rejected the assignment and subsequently elected free agency the following day.

=== Baltimore Orioles ===
On December 22, 2017, and signed a minor league contract with the Baltimore Orioles organization. He spent the entire season with the Triple–A Norfolk Tides, making 40 appearances and registering a 9–6 record and 5.33 ERA with 82 strikeouts and 4 saves across 104 2/3 innings pitched. Melville elected free agency following the season on November 2, 2018.

=== Long Island Ducks (second stint) ===
On February 5, 2019, Melville signed with the Long Island Ducks of the Atlantic League of Professional Baseball. In two starts, he posted a strong 2–0 record and 0.75 ERA with 13 strikeouts in 12 innings of work.

=== Colorado Rockies ===
On May 3, 2019, Melville's contract was purchased by the Colorado Rockies, and he was assigned to the Triple-A Albuquerque Isotopes. On August 21, the Rockies selected Melville's contract and promoted him to the major leagues as an emergency starter. In his Rockies debut against the Arizona Diamondbacks, Melville pitched 7 innings and allowed only 1 run on 2 hits as the Rockies won 7–2, giving Melville his first major league win. 5 days later, Melville made his debut at Coors Field and had another impressive performance against the Atlanta Braves, pitching 5 shutout innings and striking out 6 as the Rockies went on to defeat the Braves 3–1. Melville's ERA of 0.75 is the 3rd lowest ERA posted by a Rockies pitcher through his first two starts with the club. On October 30, Melville was removed from the 40–man roster and sent outright to Triple–A Albuquerque.

Melville re-signed with the Rockies on a minor league contract on February 5, 2020. He did not play in a game for the organization in 2020 due to the cancellation of the minor league season because of the COVID-19 pandemic. Melville was released by the Rockies organization on May 18.

=== Uni-President Lions ===
On July 12, 2020, Melville signed with the Uni-President Lions of the Chinese Professional Baseball League. He re-signed with the team for the 2021 season. On April 2, 2021, Melville pitched a no-hitter against Wei Chuan Dragons becoming the 10th player to do so in Chinese Professional Baseball League history. He also set the record of most pitches thrown in a no-hitter in the league, with 142 pitches. For the season, Melville posted a 8–7 record with a 3.74 ERA and 84 strikeouts over 122.2 innings. He was not re-signed for the 2022 season and became a free agent.

=== Wei Chuan Dragons ===
Melville took the 2022 season off as he dealt with elbow inflammation. He received platelet-rich plasma treatment for the injury. On February 8, 2023, Melville signed with the Wei Chuan Dragons of the Chinese Professional Baseball League. Pitching in 3 games, he registered a 9.24 ERA and 1.50 WHIP across 12 2/3 innings of work. On May 27, it was announced that Melville would miss 3–4 months after suffering injuries in his right elbow and tendon, and he was subsequently released by the team.

=== Long Island Ducks (third stint) ===
On August 8, 2024, Melville signed with the Long Island Ducks of the Atlantic League of Professional Baseball. In 12 games for the Ducks, he struggled to an 0–1 record and 11.17 ERA with 15 strikeouts across 9 2/3 innings pitched. Melville became a free agent following the season.

On April 14, 2025, Melville re-signed with Long Island. In 31 appearances (12 starts) for the Ducks, he logged a 5-5 record and 5.36 ERA with 74 strikeouts across 82 1/3 innings pitched. Melville was released by Long Island on September 9.

== Personal life ==
When Melville was 11 years old, he had surgery to correct his pectus excavatum at the Children's Hospital of The King's Daughters in Norfolk, Virginia. A steel rod was implanted in his chest, and removed one and a half years later.
