= Alex Young (baseball) =

American baseball player (born 1993)

Free agent
- Pitcher
- Born: September 9, 1993 (age 32); Westlake, Ohio, U.S.
- Bats: Left Throws: Left

MLB debut
- June 27, 2019, for the Arizona Diamondbacks

MLB statistics (through 2024 season)
- Win–loss record: 16–18
- Earned run average: 4.34
- Strikeouts: 239
- Stats at Baseball Reference

Teams
- Arizona Diamondbacks (2019–2021); Cleveland Indians / Guardians (2021–2022); San Francisco Giants (2022); Cincinnati Reds (2023–2024); New York Mets (2024)

Alexander Edward Young (born September 9, 1993) is an American professional baseball pitcher who is a free agent. He has previously played in Major League Baseball (MLB) for the Arizona Diamondbacks, Cleveland Indians / Guardians, San Francisco Giants, Cincinnati Reds, and New York Mets. He made his MLB debut in 2019.

Young played college baseball for Texas Christian University (TCU), and was drafted by the Diamondbacks in the second round of the 2015 MLB draft.

== Amateur career ==
Young attended Carmel High School in Mundelein, Illinois. As a senior he was 7-1 and in 41 innings allowed 13 hits while striking out 71 batters, and was named a 2012 Louisville Slugger first-team All-American and the conference Player of the Year. He was drafted by the Texas Rangers in the 32nd round of the 2012 Major League Baseball draft, but did not sign.

He attended Texas Christian University (TCU) to play college baseball. In 2014, he played collegiate summer baseball with the Falmouth Commodores of the Cape Cod Baseball League, was 3–0 with a 1.50 ERA, and was named a league all-star. After his junior year, when he was 9–3 with a 2.22 ERA in 97.1 innings, he was drafted by the Arizona Diamondbacks in the second round of the 2015 MLB draft.

== Professional career ==
=== Arizona Diamondbacks ===
==== Minor leagues ====
Young signed with the Diamondbacks and made his professional debut with the Arizona League Diamondbacks, and after one scoreless appearance, he was promoted to the Hillsboro Hops where he finished the season, posting a 1.50 ERA in six innings. In 2016, Young played for both the Kane County Cougars and Visalia Rawhide, pitching to a combined 5–8 record, 3.56 ERA and 1.31 WHIP in 21 games (20 starts) between both teams.

Young spent the 2017 season with the Jackson Generals where he went 9–9 with a 3.68 ERA in 27 games (24 starts). He split 2018 with Jackson and the Reno Aces, pitching to a combined 10–5 record with a 5.17 ERA in 29 games (21 starts) between both teams. He opened the 2019 season back with Reno.

==== Major leagues ====
On June 27, 2019, the Diamondbacks selected Young's contract and promoted him to the major leagues. He made his debut that night, pitching five innings and recording the win versus the San Francisco Giants.

On July 7, Young pitched a no-hitter through 6 innings of play vs. the Colorado Rockies at that time he was lifted by Arizona manager Torey Lovullo. Torey said he wanted to protect Young with a limited pitch count, and this decision was met with a chorus of boos from the hometown fans. The D-backs still held on to win the game 5–3. On August 2, Young collected his first MLB hit, remarkably the Diamondbacks' sole hit in a 3–0 home loss to the Nationals. Young pitched the first six innings, giving up two runs on three hits and striking out nine.

He ended the 2019 season with a record of 7–5 with an ERA of 3.56 in 83 1/3 innings, in 17 games (15 starts). His fastball velocity (87.6 mph) was in the slowest 3% in the major leagues.

In 2020, Young began the season pitching out of the bullpen before being placed in the starting rotation. In 15 games (7 starts), he finished with an ERA of 5.44 in 46 1/3 innings.

In 2021, after struggling to a 2–6 record and 6.26 ERA in 30 appearances (2 starts) with the Diamondbacks, Young was designated for assignment by Arizona on July 21.

=== Cleveland Indians / Guardians ===
On July 26, 2021, Young was claimed off of waivers by the Cleveland Indians.

Young was designated for assignment by the newly named Cleveland Guardians on November 19, 2021. After clearing waivers, he was outrighted to the Triple-A Columbus Clippers on November 24.

The Guardians selected Young's contract on July 3, 2022. With Triple–A Columbus in 2022, he had been 3–0 with one save and a 3.66 ERA in 30 relief appearances, as in 32 innings he struck out 47 batters. With the Guardians in 2022, he pitched a scoreless third of an inning, with one hit and one strikeouts. He was designated for assignment on July 14.

In 2022 to that point, he had thrown mostly an 83 mph slider, a 91 mph sinker, and an 85 mph changeup, with an occasional fourseam fastball, curveball, and cutter.

=== San Francisco Giants ===
On July 18, 2022, the Guardians traded Young to the San Francisco Giants in exchange for cash considerations.

In 2022, after pitching three scoreless innings for the Triple–A Sacramento River Cats, he pitched for the Giants. He was 1–1 with a 2.39 ERA over 24 games (one start) covering 26 1/3 innings. On November 18, he was non tendered and became a free agent.

=== Cincinnati Reds ===
On January 17, 2023, Young signed a minor league contract with the Cincinnati Reds that included an invitation to spring training. On March 30, Young had his contract selected after making the Opening Day roster. In 63 relief outings for Cincinnati, he logged a 3.86 ERA with 50 strikeouts across 53 2/3 innings pitched.

Young began the 2024 season on the injured list with low back disc degeneration after suffering the injury in spring training. He was transferred to the 60–day injured list on April 24, 2024. Young was activated from the injured list on May 28.

=== San Francisco Giants (second stint) ===
On July 7, 2024, the Reds traded Young to the San Francisco Giants in exchange for Austin Slater. He made two appearances for the Triple–A Sacramento River Cats, allowing three runs on five hits with one strikeout over two innings pitched.

=== New York Mets ===
On July 17, 2024, Young was claimed off waivers by the New York Mets. In 14 appearances for New York, he posted a 3.29 ERA with 13 strikeouts across 13^{2}/_{3} innings pitched. On November 22, Young was non-tendered by the Mets and became a free agent.

=== Cincinnati Reds (second stint) ===
On January 20, 2025, Young signed a minor league contract with the Cincinnati Reds. On March 18, it was announced that Young was seeking a second opinion for an elbow injury, with Tommy John surgery being a possibility. He underwent an unspecified season-ending surgery on his left elbow on March 31, after it was revealed that he had been pitching through a distal tear in the elbow for the past nine years. Young elected free agency following the season on November 6.

=== Washington Nationals ===
On May 13, 2026, Young signed a minor league contract with the Washington Nationals. He made 18 appearances (three starts) for the rookie–level Florida Complex League Nationals, High–A Fredericksburg Nationals, Double–A Harrisburg Senators, and Triple–A Rochester Red Wings, posting a cumulative 4–0 record and 4.86 ERA with 16 strikeouts across 16 2/3 innings pitched. Young was released by the Nationals organization on August 4.
