= Antonio Senzatela =

Venezuelan baseball player (born 1995)

- Senzatela with the Milwaukee Brewers in 2026

Free agent
- Pitcher
- Born: January 21, 1995 (age 31); Valencia, Venezuela
- Bats: Right Throws: Right

MLB debut
- April 6, 2017, for the Colorado Rockies

MLB statistics (through 2026 season)
- Win–loss record: 54–64
- Earned run average: 5.09
- Strikeouts: 591
- Stats at Baseball Reference

Teams
- Colorado Rockies (2017–2026); Milwaukee Brewers (2026)

Career highlights and awards
- World Series champion (2026)
Medals
Men's baseball
Representing Venezuela
World Baseball Classic
Gold medal – first place	2026 Miami	Team

Antonio Senzatela Rondón (born January 21, 1995) is a Venezuelan professional baseball pitcher who is a free agent. He has previously played in MLB for the Colorado Rockies and the Milwaukee Brewers.

== Career ==
=== Colorado Rockies ===
==== Minor leagues ====
The Colorado Rockies signed Senzatela as an amateur free agent on July 8, 2011. He made his professional debut with the Dominican Summer League Rockies in 2012.

In 2014, MiLB.com named Senzatela as one of the Rockies' Organization All-Stars after he posted a 15–2 win–loss record with a 3.11 earned run average (ERA) for the Asheville Tourists of the Single–A South Atlantic League, helping the team to win the league championship. Prior to the 2015 season, he was named by MLB.com as the Rockies' 11th best prospect. The Rockies added Senzatela to their 40-man roster after the 2015 season. In 2016, Senzatela pitched for the Hartford Yard Goats of the Double–A Eastern League.

==== 2017 ====
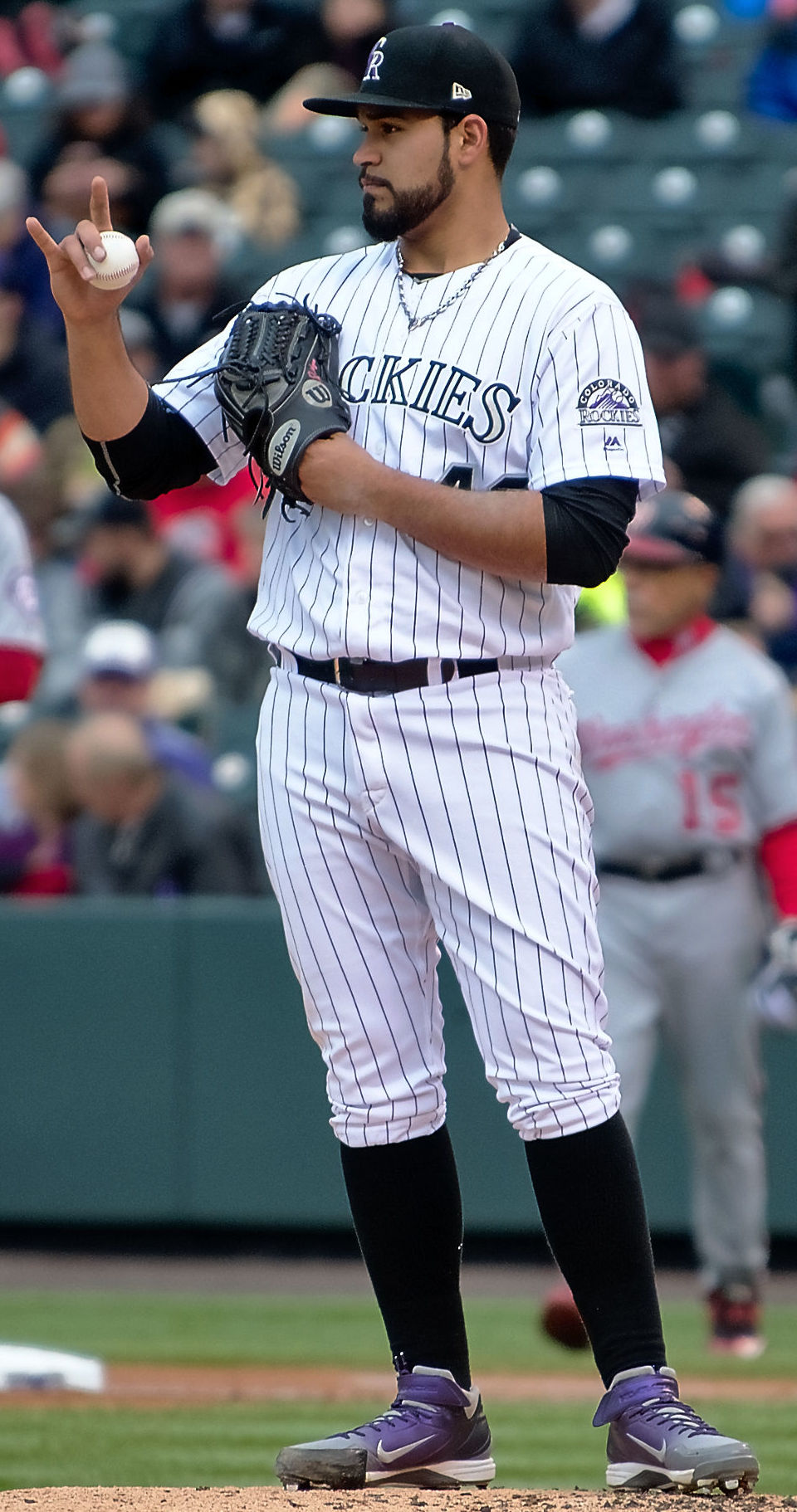
Senzatela with the Rockies in 2017

Senzatela made the Rockies' Opening Day roster in 2017 and he made his major league debut on April 6. Senzatela had a 3–1 win–loss record and a 2.81 ERA in five starts in April, and was named the National League's Rookie of the Month. After pitching to a 9–3 record and a 4.68 ERA in 88⅓ innings (15 starts), Senzatela was shifted to a relief pitcher in order to monitor his innings, due to him missing most of the 2016 baseball season due to various injuries. Senzatela finished the season with a 10–5 record in 36 games, 20 starts.

==== 2018 ====
Senzatela began the 2018 season as a relief pitcher for the Rockies. After 10 appearances, he was sent down to the Triple–A Albuquerque Isotopes. He was placed on the disabled list on July 12 with a blister injury. He finished the season with a 6–6 record in 23 games (13 starts).

==== 2019 ====
The following season, Senzatela won 11 games with a career worst 6.71 ERA in 25 starts. He struck out 76 batters in 124 2/3 innings.

==== 2020 ====
In 2020, Senzatela was 5–3 with a 3.44 ERA, and had the lowest strikeouts per nine innings ratio of all qualified NL pitchers (5.0).

==== 2021 ====
In 2021, he set career highs in starts (28), innings pitched (156 2/3) and strikeouts (105), despite posting a record of 4–10 with a 4.42 ERA. Following the season, the Rockies signed Senzatela to a five-year contract extension worth $50.5 million.

==== 2022 ====
On April 23, 2022, in a game against the Detroit Tigers, Senzatela allowed Miguel Cabrera's 3,000th hit. The play was a single into right field and the Rockies would eventually lose 13–0. On August 18, Senzatela left his start against the St. Louis Cardinals with a left knee sprain. The next day, an MRI revealed a torn ACL which ended Senzatela's 2022 season. He finished with a record of 3–7 with a 5.07 ERA and 54 strikeouts in 92 1/3 innings pitched.

==== 2023 ====
Senzatela made his season debut on May 5, 2023, against the New York Mets. In the start, he allowed one run on a Brandon Nimmo solo shot, which ended being the decider in a 1–0 loss. In his next start on May 10, Senzatela went 2 2/3 innings and allowed three runs on four hits, including a two–run homer off the bat of Andrew McCutchen. He was removed from the appearance partway through the third inning with an undisclosed injury, which was later described as right forearm tightness. Two days later, he was diagnosed with a UCL sprain in his right elbow. He was placed on the 60-day injured list on June 11. On July 14, it was announced that Senzatela would undergo Tommy John surgery and miss the remainder of the season.

==== 2024 ====
On September 16, 2024, Senzatela was activated from the injured list to make his return from surgery. Senzatela made his season debut that day, allowing four hits, two earned runs, and two strikeouts in three innings pitched.

==== 2025 ====
Senzatela began the 2025 season pitching out of Colorado's rotation, but struggled to a 4–15 record and 7.15 ERA with 61 strikeouts in 112 innings pitched across 24 appearances (23 starts). On August 28, 2025, the Rockies moved Senzatela to the bullpen.

==== 2026 ====
Senzatela made 34 appearances out of the bullpen for Colorado in 2026, compiling a 9–2 record and 3.61 ERA with 46 strikeouts and three saves across 52 1/3 innings pitched.

=== Milwaukee Brewers ===
On August 3, 2026, the Rockies traded Senzatela to the Milwaukee Brewers in exchange for Juan Martinez and Mark Manfredi. In 23 relief appearances for Milwaukee, he posted a 2-3 record with a 5.14 ERA and one save with 14 strikeouts across 21 innings pitched. In the postseason, Senzatela pitched 9 1/3 scoreless innings across 4 appearances as the Brewers won the World Series, giving Senzatela his first World Series ring. On November 2, the Brewers declined his $14 million option, making him a free agent.

== Scouting report ==
Senzatela throws from a high three quarters release, relying on a 92–95 miles per hour (148–153 km/h) fastball, an 82 miles per hour (132 km/h) slider with cutting movement, and a changeup.

== Personal life ==
Senzatela's mother, Nidya, died from stomach cancer in 2016. He is married.
