= Yoan López =

Cuban baseball player (born 1993)

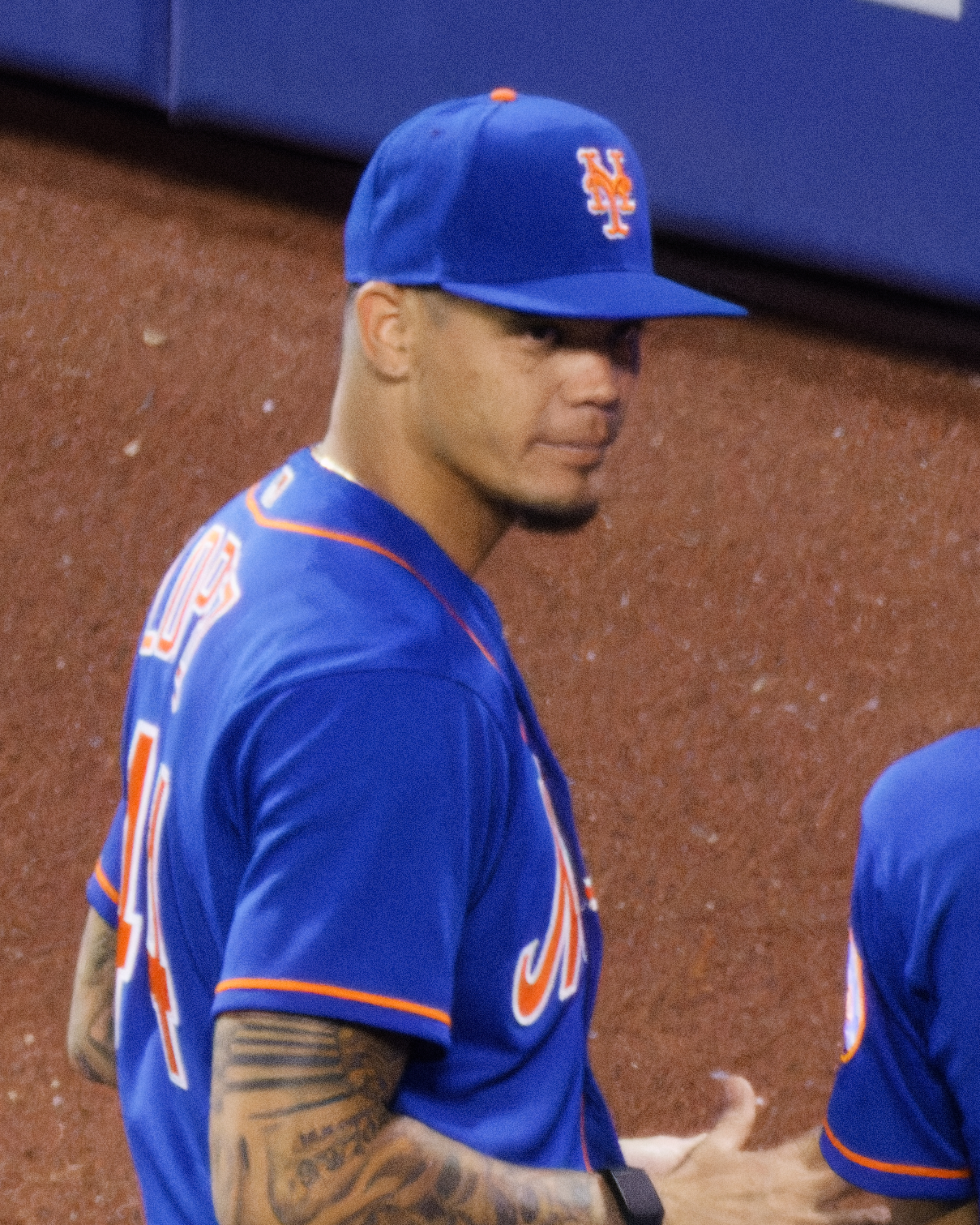
- López with the Mets in 2022

Algodoneros de Unión Laguna – No. 35
- Pitcher
- Born: January 2, 1993 (age 33); Nueva Gerona, Cuba
- Bats: Right Throws: Right

Professional debut
- MLB: September 9, 2018, for the Arizona Diamondbacks
- NPB: March 31, 2023, for the Yomiuri Giants

MLB statistics (through 2022 season)
- Win–loss record: 3–8
- Earned run average: 4.39
- Strikeouts: 92

NPB statistics (through 2023 season)
- Win–loss record: 0–1
- Earned run average: 4.05
- Strikeouts: 2
- Stats at Baseball Reference

Teams
- Arizona Diamondbacks (2018–2021); New York Mets (2022); Yomiuri Giants (2023)

Yoan López Leyva (born January 2, 1993) is a Cuban professional baseball pitcher for the Algodoneros de Unión Laguna of the Mexican League. He has previously played in Major League Baseball (MLB) for the Arizona Diamondbacks and New York Mets, and in Nippon Professional Baseball (NPB) for the Yomiuri Giants.

== Career ==
=== Arizona Diamondbacks ===
López played three seasons for the Isla de la Juventud in the Cuban National Series. He defected from Cuba in 2014 to pursue a career in Major League Baseball (MLB). In his final season in Cuba, he had a 3.12 earned run average (ERA) with 28 strikeouts in 49 innings pitched. He received interest from numerous teams, including the New York Yankees, San Francisco Giants, and San Diego Padres before signing with the Arizona Diamondbacks. In 2015, he played for both the Arizona League Diamondbacks of the Rookie-level Arizona League and the Mobile BayBears of the Double–A Southern League, pitching to a combined 2–6 record and 4.17 ERA in 54 innings between both teams.

In 2016, López pitched for Mobile. He struggled, posting a 5.52 ERA in 62 innings, and left the team with the intention to retire. However, he returned to the organization in September 2016 to pitch for the Diamondbacks' Arizona League affiliate. He spent 2017 with the Visalia Rawhide of the High–A California League and posted a 2–0 record with a 0.88 ERA along with 56 strikeouts in 30 2/3 innings. In 2018, he pitched for the Jackson Generals of the Southern League.

The Diamondbacks promoted him to the major leagues on September 3. López faced the Atlanta Braves six days later in his major league debut, giving up 2 home runs and a triple in his first 8 pitches. In 2019, he pitched out of the bullpen for Arizona, appearing in 70 games. In 2020, López pitched to a 5.95 ERA with 16 strikeouts and 9 walks in 19.2 innings of work. After recording a 6.57 ERA in 13 appearances, López was designated for assignment on May 20, 2021.

=== Atlanta Braves ===
On May 22, 2021, López was traded to the Atlanta Braves in exchange for Deivi Estrada and was assigned to the Triple-A Gwinnett Stripers. In 32 appearances for Triple-A Gwinnett, López went 3–2 with a 3.03 ERA and 35 strikeouts. On November 22, López was designated for assignment by the Braves.

=== New York Mets ===
On November 29, 2021, López was claimed off of waivers by the Philadelphia Phillies. On March 16, 2022, López was designated for assignment by Philadelphia after the signing of Odúbel Herrera was made official. On March 18, he was claimed again, this time by the Miami Marlins. On March 27, 2022, Lopez was designated for assignment following the waiver claim of Tommy Nance.

On March 29, 2022, López was claimed off of waivers for a third time, by the New York Mets. On May 2, López was suspended 3 games and fined following an incident in which he intentionally threw a pitch at Philadelphia Phillies batter Kyle Schwarber.

He was released on December 21, 2022.

=== Yomiuri Giants ===
On December 22, 2022, López signed with the Yomiuri Giants of Nippon Professional Baseball. In 8 games for the Giants in 2023, he pitched to a 4.05 ERA with 2 strikeouts in 6 2/3 innings pitched. On November 27, 2023, Yomiuri announced that López would not be returning to the club the following year.

=== Algodoneros de Unión Laguna ===
On February 26, 2024, López signed with the Algodoneros de Unión Laguna of the Mexican League. In 49 appearances for the Algodoneros, he compiled a 4–1 record and 1.18 ERA with 54 strikeouts and 3 saves across 53 1/3 innings pitched.

López re-signed with Laguna for a second season in 2025. In 45 games 46 innings of relief he went 2-3 with a 4.89 ERA with 43 strikeouts and 19 saves.

== See also ==
- List of baseball players who defected from Cuba
