= 2019 Pittsburgh Pirates season =

Major League Baseball team

2019 Pittsburgh Pirates
- League: National League
- Division: Central
- Ballpark: PNC Park
- City: Pittsburgh, Pennsylvania
- Record: 69–93 (.426)
- Divisional place: 5th
- Owners: Bob Nutting
- General managers: Neal Huntington
- Managers: Clint Hurdle; Tom Prince
- Television: AT&T SportsNet Pittsburgh
- Radio: KDKA-FM; Pittsburgh Pirates Radio Network (Steve Blass, Joe Block, Greg Brown, Bob Walk, John Wehner)
- Stats: ESPN.com; Baseball Reference

The 2019 Pittsburgh Pirates season was the franchise's 138th season overall, 133rd season as a member of the National League, and 19th season at PNC Park. The Pirates were eliminated from postseason contention after a 14–1 loss to the Cubs on September 14, 2019. Manager Clint Hurdle was fired an hour before the start of the final game of the 2019 season. Tom Prince, the Pirates' bench coach, managed the team for the season finale.

== Season standings ==
=== National League Central ===
NL Central
Team	W	L	Pct.	GB	Home	Road
St. Louis Cardinals	91	71	.562	—	50‍–‍31	41‍–‍40
Milwaukee Brewers	89	73	.549	2	49‍–‍32	40‍–‍41
Chicago Cubs	84	78	.519	7	51‍–‍30	33‍–‍48
Cincinnati Reds	75	87	.463	16	41‍–‍40	34‍–‍47
Pittsburgh Pirates	69	93	.426	22	35‍–‍46	34‍–‍47

=== National League playoff standings ===
Division leaders
Team	W	L	Pct.
Los Angeles Dodgers	106	56	.654
Atlanta Braves	97	65	.599
St. Louis Cardinals	91	71	.562

Wild Card teams (Top 2 teams qualify for postseason)
Team	W	L	Pct.	GB
Washington Nationals	93	69	.574	+4
Milwaukee Brewers	89	73	.549	—
New York Mets	86	76	.531	3
Arizona Diamondbacks	85	77	.525	4
Chicago Cubs	84	78	.519	5
Philadelphia Phillies	81	81	.500	8
San Francisco Giants	77	85	.475	12
Cincinnati Reds	75	87	.463	14
Colorado Rockies	71	91	.438	18
San Diego Padres	70	92	.432	19
Pittsburgh Pirates	69	93	.426	20
Miami Marlins	57	105	.352	32

=== Record vs. opponents ===
2019 National League record Source: MLB Standings Grid – 2019
Team	AZ	ATL	CHC	CIN	COL	LAD	MIA	MIL	NYM	PHI	PIT	SD	SF	STL	WSH	AL
Arizona	—	4–3	2–4	3–3	9–10	8–11	3–4	2–5	2–5	4–2	6–1	11–8	10–9	3–3	4–3	14–6
Atlanta	3–4	—	5–2	3–4	3–3	2–4	15–4	3–3	11–8	9–10	5–2	5–2	5–2	4–2	11–8	13–7
Chicago	4–2	2–5	—	8–11	3–3	3–4	6–1	9–10	5–2	2–5	11–8	4–3	4–2	9–10	2–4	12–8
Cincinnati	3–3	4–3	11–8	—	3–3	1–5	6–1	8–11	3–4	3–4	7–12	5–2	4–3	7–12	1–5	9–11
Colorado	10–9	3–3	3–3	3–3	—	4–15	5–2	5–2	2–4	3–4	2–5	11–8	7–12	2–5	3–4	8–12
Los Angeles	11–8	4–2	4–3	5–1	15–4	—	5–1	4–3	5–2	5–2	6–0	13–6	12–7	3–4	4–3	10–10
Miami	4–3	4–15	1–6	1–6	2–5	1–5	—	2–5	6–13	10–9	3–3	4–2	3–3	3–4	4–15	9–11
Milwaukee	5–2	3–3	10–9	11–8	2–5	3–4	5–2	—	5–1	4–3	15–4	3–4	2–4	9–10	4–2	8–12
New York	5–2	8–11	2–5	4–3	4–2	2–5	13–6	1–5	—	7–12	5–1	3–3	3–4	2–5	12–7	15–5
Philadelphia	2–4	10–9	5–2	4–3	4–3	2–5	9–10	3–4	12–7	—	4–2	3–3	3–4	4–2	5–14	11–9
Pittsburgh	1–6	2–5	8–11	12–7	5–2	0–6	3–3	4–15	1–5	2–4	—	6–1	5–2	5–14	3–4	12–8
San Diego	8–11	2–5	3–4	2–5	8–11	6–13	2–4	4–3	3–3	3–3	1–6	—	9–10	4–2	4–3	11–9
San Francisco	9–10	2–5	2–4	3–4	12–7	7–12	3–3	4–2	4–3	4–3	2–5	10–9	—	3–4	1–5	11–9
St. Louis	3–3	2–4	10–9	12–7	5–2	4–3	4–3	10–9	5–2	2–4	14–5	2–4	4–3	—	5–2	9–11
Washington	3–4	8–11	4–2	5–1	4–3	3–4	15–4	2–4	7–12	14–5	4–3	3–4	5–1	2–5	—	14–6

=== Detailed records ===
National League
Opponent	W	L	WP	RS	RA
NL East
Atlanta Braves	2	5	0.286	42	51
Miami Marlins	3	3	0.500	36	28
New York Mets	1	5	0.167	25	41
Philadelphia Phillies	2	4	0.333	20	31
Washington Nationals	3	4	0.429	18	41
Total	11	21	0.344	141	192
NL Central
Chicago Cubs	8	11	0.421	88	125
Cincinnati Reds	12	7	0.632	100	82
Milwaukee Brewers	4	15	0.211	82	117
Pittsburgh Pirates					
St. Louis Cardinals	5	14	0.263	76	116
Total	29	47	0.382	346	440
NL West
Arizona Diamondbacks	1	6	0.143	17	52
Colorado Rockies	5	2	0.714	54	38
Los Angeles Dodgers	0	6	0.000	20	44
San Diego Padres	6	1	0.857	40	27
San Francisco Giants	5	2	0.714	29	19
Total	17	17	0.500	160	180
American League
Detroit Tigers	3	1	0.750	20	17
Houston Astros	2	1	0.667	25	7
Los Angeles Angels	2	1	0.667	24	16
Oakland Athletics	2	1	0.667	12	21
Seattle Mariners	0	3	0.000	6	16
Texas Rangers	3	1	0.750	24	22
Total	12	8	0.600	111	99
Season Total	69	93	0.426	758	911

Month	Games	Won	Lost	Win %	RS	RA
March	2	1	1	0.500	8	5
April	25	12	13	0.480	82	104
May	29	15	14	0.517	143	188
June	26	11	15	0.423	143	135
July	26	8	18	0.308	128	147
August	28	12	16	0.429	144	172
September	26	10	16	0.385	110	160
Total	162	69	93	0.426	758	911

	Games	Won	Lost	Win %	RS	RA
Home	81	35	46	0.432	378	458
Away	81	34	47	0.420	380	453
Total	162	69	93	0.426	758	911

== Game log ==
2019 Game Log: 69–93 (Home: 35–46; Away: 34–47)
**March: 1–1 (Home: 0–0; Away: 1–1)**

#	Date	Opponent	Score	Win	Loss	Save	Attendance	Record	Streak
1	March 28	@ Reds	3–5	Duke (1–0)	**Taillon** (0–1)	Hernandez (1)	44,049	0–1	L1
—	March 30	@ Reds	PPD, RAIN; rescheduled for May 27						
2	March 31	@ Reds	5–0	**Williams** (1–0)	Gray (0–1)	—	18,737	1–1	W1

**April: 12–13 (Home: 6–7; Away: 6–6)**

#	Date	Opponent	Score	Win	Loss	Save	Attendance	Record	Streak
3	April 1	Cardinals	5–6 (11)	Hicks (1–1)	**Brault** (0–1)	Gant (1)	37,336	1–2	L1
4	April 3	Cardinals	4–5 (10)	Gant (2–0)	**Burdi** (0–1)	Hudson (1)	23,954	1–3	L2
5	April 4	Reds	2–0	**Kingham** (1–0)	Hernandez (0–1)	**Vázquez** (1)	8,523	2–3	W1
6	April 5	Reds	2–0	**Musgrove** (1–0)	Gray (0–2)	**Vázquez** (2)	12,497	3–3	W2
7	April 6	Reds	6–5 (10)	**Liriano** (1–0)	Iglesias (0–2)	—	15,798	4–3	W3
8	April 7	Reds	7–5	**Archer** (1–0)	DeSclafani (0–1)	**Rodríguez** (1)	14,750	5–3	W4
9	April 8	@ Cubs	0–10	Brach (1–0)	**Taillon** (0–2)	—	40,692	5–4	L1
10	April 10	@ Cubs	5–2	**Lyles** (1–0)	Darvish (0–2)	**Vázquez** (3)	32,798	6–4	W1
11	April 11	@ Cubs	0–2	Quintana (1–1)	**Musgrove** (1–1)	Strop (1)	31,906	6–5	L1
12	April 12	@ Nationals	6–3 (10)	**Burdi** (1–1)	Grace (0–1)	**Vázquez** (4)	27,084	7–5	W1
13	April 13	@ Nationals	2–3	Suero (1–0)	**Rodríguez** (0–1)	Doolittle (1)	32,103	7–6	L1
14	April 14	@ Nationals	4–3	**Vázquez** (1–0)	Suero (1–1)	—	22,347	8–6	W1
15	April 16	@ Tigers	5–3 (10)	**Kela** (1–0)	Greene (0–1)	**Kingham** (1)	13,251	9–6	W2
16	April 17	@ Tigers	3–2 (10)	**Burdi** (2–1)	Farmer (1–1)	**Vázquez** (5)	12,994	10–6	W3
17	April 19	Giants	4–1	**Lyles** (2–0)	Bumgarner (1–3)	**Vázquez** (6)	15,049	11–6	W4
18	April 20	Giants	3–1 (5)	**Taillon** (1–2)	Holland (1–3)	—	17,663	12–6	W5
19	April 21	Giants	2–3	Rodríguez (3–2)	**Archer** (1–1)	Smith (5)	12,396	12–7	L1
20	April 22	Diamondbacks	4–12	Andriese (3–1)	**Crick** (0–1)	—	9,233	12–8	L2
21	April 23	Diamondbacks	1–2	Weaver (2–1)	**Williams** (1–1)	Holland (5)	8,558	12–9	L3
22	April 24	Diamondbacks	2–11	Kelly (2–2)	**Lyles** (2–1)	—	9,450	12–10	L4
23	April 25	Diamondbacks	0–5	Greinke (4–1)	**Taillon** (1–3)	—	9,365	12–11	L5
24	April 26	@ Dodgers	2–6	Ryu (3–1)	**Archer** (1–2)	—	50,748	12–12	L6
25	April 27	@ Dodgers	1–3	Kershaw (1–0)	**Musgrove** (1–2)	Jansen (9)	47,877	12–13	L7
26	April 28	@ Dodgers	6–7	Urías (2–1)	**Rodríguez** (0–2)	Jansen (10)	52,875	12–14	L8
27	April 30	@ Rangers	6–4 (11)	**Crick** (1–1)	Chavez (0–1)	**Vázquez** (7)	18,641	13–14	W1

**May: 15–14 (Home: 5–8; Away: 10–6)**

#	Date	Opponent	Score	Win	Loss	Save	Attendance	Record	Streak
28	May 1	@ Rangers	7–5	**Taillon** (2–3)	Miller (1–2)	**Vázquez** (8)	23,562	14–14	W2
29	May 3	Athletics	1–14	Anderson (4–2)	**Musgrove** (1–3)	—	16,428	14–15	L1
30	May 4	Athletics	6–4	**Feliz** (1–0)	Wendelken (0–1)	**Vázquez** (9)	26,447	15–15	W1
31	May 5	Athletics	5–3 (13)	**Lyons** (1–0)	Rodney (0–2)	—	18,517	16–15	W2
32	May 7	Rangers	5–4	**Feliz** (2–0)	Sampson (0–2)	**Vázquez** (10)	13,032	17–15	W3
33	May 8	Rangers	6–9	Jurado (1–1)	**Lyons** (1–1)	Martin (1)	13,905	17–16	L1
34	May 9	@ Cardinals	4–17	Wacha (3–0)	**Musgrove** (1–4)	—	38,925	17–17	L2
35	May 10	@ Cardinals	2–1	**Williams** (2–1)	Miller (1–2)	**Vázquez** (11)	45,060	18–17	W1
36	May 11	@ Cardinals	2–1	**Lyles** (3–1)	Mikolas (4–3)	**Vázquez** (12)	43,011	19–17	W2
37	May 12	@ Cardinals	10–6	**Stratton** (1–2)	Brebbia (1–2)	—	48,555	20–17	W3
38	May 13	@ Diamondbacks	3–9	Ray (3–1)	**Kingham** (1–1)	—	15,418	20–18	L1
39	May 14	@ Diamondbacks	6–2	**Musgrove** (2–4)	Weaver (3–2)	—	21,047	21–18	W1
40	May 15	@ Diamondbacks	1–11	Greinke (6–1)	**Archer** (1–3)	—	17,258	21–19	L1
41	May 16	@ Padres	3–4	Warren (3–1)	**Rodríguez** (0–3)	Yates (17)	20,877	21–20	L2
42	May 17	@ Padres	5–3	**Lyles** (4–1)	Lucchesi (3–3)	—	28,913	22–20	W1
43	May 18	@ Padres	7–2	**Brault** (1–1)	Margevicius (2–5)	—	39,856	23–20	W2
44	May 19	@ Padres	6–4	**Musgrove** (3–4)	Quantrill (0–2)	**Vázquez** (13)	29,863	24–20	W3
45	May 21	Rockies	0–5	Márquez (5–2)	**Archer** (1–4)	—	12,265	24–21	L1
46	May 22	Rockies	3–9	Gray (4–4)	**DuRapau** (0–1)	—	9,534	24–22	L2
47	May 23	Rockies	14–6	**Lyles** (5–1)	Senzatela (3–4)	—	15,490	25–22	W1
48	May 24	Dodgers	2–10	Buehler (5–1)	**Feliz** (2–1)	—	32,388	25–23	L1
49	May 25	Dodgers	2–7	Ryu (7–1)	**Musgrove** (3–5)	—	25,852	25–24	L2
50	May 26	Dodgers	7–11	Maeda (6–2)	**Archer** (1–5)	—	25,260	25–25	L3
51	May 27 (1)	@ Reds	8–5	**Crick** (2–1)	Hernandez (1–3)	**Vázquez** (14)	20,569	26–25	W1
52	May 27 (2)	@ Reds	1–8	Gray (2–4)	**Keller** (0–1)	—	27,489	26–26	L1
53	May 28	@ Reds	6–11	Sims (1–0)	**Lyles** (5–2)	—	13,824	26–27	L2
54	May 29	@ Reds	7–2	**Brault** (2–1)	DeSclafani (2–3)	—	15,252	27–27	W1
55	May 30	Brewers	5–11	Anderson (3–0)	**Musgrove** (3–6)	—	13,059	27–28	L1
56	May 31	Brewers	9–4	**Archer** (2–5)	Chacín (3–7)	—	28,465	28–28	W1

**June: 11–15 (Home: 6–4; Away: 5–11)**

#	Date	Opponent	Score	Win	Loss	Save	Attendance	Record	Streak
57	June 1	Brewers	10–12 (13)	Houser (1–1)	**McRae** (0–1)	—	28,770	28–29	L1
58	June 2	Brewers	2–4	Davies (6–0)	**Lyles** (5–3)	Burnes (1)	19,442	28–30	L2
59	June 4	Braves	5–12	Winkler (2–1)	**Crick** (2–2)	—	13,963	28–31	L3
60	June 5	Braves	7–4	**Musgrove** (4–6)	Gausman (2–5)	—	13,904	29–31	W1
61	June 6	Braves	6–1	**Archer** (3–5)	Foltynewicz (1–5)	**Vázquez** (15)	18,232	30–31	W2
62	June 7	@ Brewers	4–10	Woodruff (8–1)	**Davis** (0–1)	—	30,296	30–32	L1
63	June 8	@ Brewers	3–5	Davies (7–0)	**Feliz** (2–2)	Hader (15)	40,704	30–33	L2
64	June 9	@ Brewers	2–5	Jeffress (1–0)	**Liriano** (1–1)	Hader (16)	45,375	30–34	L3
65	June 10	@ Braves	7–13	Newcomb (1–0)	**McRae** (0–2)	Webb (2)	21,822	30–35	L4
66	June 11	@ Braves	5–7 (8)	Toussaint (4–0)	**Archer** (3–6)	Swarzak (4)	31,305	30–36	L5
67	June 12	@ Braves	7–8 (11)	Webb (4–0)	**Feliz** (2–3)	—	24,428	30–37	L6
68	June 13	@ Braves	5–6	Teherán (5–4)	**Musgrove** (4–7)	Jackson (10)	35,108	30–38	L7
69	June 14	@ Marlins	11–0	**Brault** (3–1)	Richards (3–7)	—	8,340	31–38	W1
70	June 15	@ Marlins	3–4	López (5–5)	**Hartlieb** (0–1)	Romo (12)	11,464	31–39	L1
71	June 16	@ Marlins	5–4	**Rodríguez** (1–3)	Anderson (2–3)	**Vázquez** (16)	12,472	32–39	W1
72	June 18	Tigers	4–5	Farmer (4–4)	**Crick** (2–3)	Greene (21)	18,301	32–40	L1
73	June 19	Tigers	8–7	**Rodríguez** (2–3)	Ramirez (3–2)	**Vázquez** (17)	18,088	33–40	W1
74	June 21	Padres	2–1	**Musgrove** (5–7)	Lauer (5–7)	**Vázquez** (18)	33,437	34–40	W2
75	June 22	Padres	6–3	**Crick** (3–3)	Stammen (5–4)	**Vázquez** (19)	26,919	35–40	W3
76	June 23	Padres	11–10 (11)	**Liriano** (2–1)	Wisler (2–2)	—	25,294	36–40	W4
77	June 25	@ Astros	1–5	Cole (7–5)	**Williams** (2–2)	—	37,193	36–41	L1
78	June 26	@ Astros	14–2	**Agrazal** (1–0)	Valdez (3–4)	—	39,312	37–41	W1
79	June 27	@ Astros	10–0	**Musgrove** (6–7)	Peacock (6–6)	—	38,943	38–41	W2
80	June 28	@ Brewers	3–2	**Vázquez** (2–0)	Jeffress (1–2)	—	33,931	39–41	W3
81	June 29	@ Brewers	1–3	Woodruff (10–2)	**Lyles** (5–4)	Hader (20)	37,821	39–42	L1
82	June 30	@ Brewers	1–2	Jeffress (2–2)	**Crick** (3–4)	Albers (1)	41,257	39–43	L2

**July: 8–18 (Home: 6–8; Away: 2–10)**

#	Date	Opponent	Score	Win	Loss	Save	Attendance	Record	Streak
83	July 1	Cubs	18–5	**Williams** (3–2)	Alzolay (1–1)	—	17,772	40–43	W1
84	July 2	Cubs	5–1	**Holmes** (1–0)	Hendricks (7–6)	—	14,573	41–43	W2
85	July 3	Cubs	6–5	**Rodríguez** (3–3)	Kimbrel (0–1)	—	17,831	42–43	W3
86	July 4	Cubs	3–11	Quintana (6–7)	**Lyles** (5–5)	—	29,238	42–44	L1
87	July 5	Brewers	6–7 (10)	Guerra (3–1)	**Vázquez** (2–1)	—	23,229	42–45	L2
88	July 6	Brewers	12–2	**Agrazal** (2–0)	Houser (2–3)	—	28,038	43–45	W1
89	July 7	Brewers	6–5	**Liriano** (3–1)	Guerra (3–2)	**Vázquez** (20)	17,624	44–45	W2
**90th All-Star Game in Cleveland, OH**
90	July 12	@ Cubs	3–4	Rosario (1–0)	**Crick** (3–5)	Kimbrel (3)	40,740	44–46	L1
91	July 13	@ Cubs	4–10	Lester (9–6)	**Lyles** (5–6)	—	40,286	44–47	L2
92	July 14	@ Cubs	3–8	Quintana (7–7)	**Williams** (3–3)	—	39,291	44–48	L3
93	July 15	@ Cardinals	0–7	Mikolas (6–9)	**Musgrove** (6–8)	—	41,965	44–49	L4
94	July 16	@ Cardinals	3–1	**Liriano** (4–1)	Martínez (2–1)	**Vázquez** (21)	43,777	45–49	W1
95	July 17	@ Cardinals	5–6	Brebbia (3–3)	**Liriano** (4–2)	Martínez (6)	43,186	45–50	L1
96	July 19	Phillies	1–6	Nicasio (2–3)	**Rodríguez** (3–4)	Irvin (1)	34,117	45–51	L2
97	July 20	Phillies	5–1	**Musgrove** (7–8)	Eflin (7–10)	—	38,380	46–51	W1
98	July 21	Phillies	1–2 (11)	Suárez (3–0)	**Stratton** (1–3)	—	24,830	46–52	L1
99	July 22	Cardinals	5–6 (10)	Shreve (1–0)	**Holmes** (1–1)	Martínez (9)	13,096	46–53	L2
100	July 23	Cardinals	3–4	Hudson (10–4)	**Archer** (3–7)	Miller (3)	15,778	46–54	L3
101	July 24	Cardinals	8–14	Wainwright (7–7)	**Lyles** (5–7)	—	18,675	46–55	L4
102	July 25	Cardinals	3–6	Mikolas (7–10)	**Musgrove** (7–9)	—	24,534	46–56	L5
103	July 26	@ Mets	3–6	Wheeler (7–6)	**Agrazal** (2–1)	Lugo (1)	33,776	46–57	L6
104	July 27	@ Mets	0–3	Matz (6–6)	**Williams** (3–4)	—	39,944	46–58	L7
105	July 28	@ Mets	7–8	Vargas (6–5)	**Archer** (3–8)	Díaz (23)	32,976	46–59	L8
106	July 29	@ Reds	6–11	Gray (6–6)	**McRae** (0–3)	—	15,944	46–60	L9
107	July 30	@ Reds	11–4	**Musgrove** (8–9)	Roark (6–7)	—	18,786	47–60	W1
108	July 31	@ Reds	1–4	Castillo (10–4)	**Agrazal** (2–2)	Iglesias (20)	20,886	47–61	L1

**August: 12–16 (Home: 6–10; Away: 6–6)**

#	Date	Opponent	Score	Win	Loss	Save	Attendance	Record	Streak
109	August 2	Mets	8–4	**Williams** (4–4)	Matz (6–7)	—	24,311	48–61	W1
110	August 3	Mets	5–7	Wilson (3–1)	**Crick** (3–6)	—	37,335	48–62	L1
111	August 4	Mets	2–13	Syndergaard (8–5)	**Musgrove** (8–10)	—	22,716	48–63	L2
112	August 5	Brewers	7–9	Lyles (7–7)	**Agrazal** (2–3)	Hader (25)	11,208	48–64	L3
113	August 6	Brewers	3–4	Guerra (4–3)	**Liriano** (4–3)	Albers (2)	13,969	48–65	L4
114	August 7	Brewers	3–8	Guerra (5–3)	**Williams** (4–5)	—	12,885	48–66	L5
115	August 9	@ Cardinals	2–6	Martínez (3–2)	**Rodríguez** (3–5)	—	42,757	48–67	L6
116	August 10	@ Cardinals	1–3	Wainwright (8–8)	**Musgrove** (8–11)	Martínez (12)	45,026	48–68	L7
117	August 11	@ Cardinals	9–11	Gant (8–0)	**Crick** (3–7)	Miller (4)	43,912	48–69	L8
118	August 12	@ Angels	10–2	**Keller** (1–1)	Suárez (2–4)	—	33,527	49–69	W1
119	August 13	@ Angels	10–7	**Williams** (5–5)	Cole (2–4)	**Vázquez** (22)	33,568	50–69	W2
120	August 14	@ Angels	4–7	Peters (3–1)	**Archer** (3–9)	—	33,542	50–70	L1
121	August 16	Cubs	3–2	**Kela** (2–0)	Kintzler (2–2)	—	29,746	51–70	W1
122	August 17	Cubs	0–2	Lester (10–8)	**Brault** (3–2)	Wick (1)	28,359	51–71	L1
123	August 18	Cubs	1–7	Quintana (11–7)	**Keller** (1–2)	—	2,503	51–72	L2
124	August 19	Nationals	0–13	Guerra (2–1)	**Williams** (5–6)	—	11,284	51–73	L3
125	August 20	Nationals	4–1	**Vázquez** (3–1)	Suero (3–7)	—	10,449	52–73	W1
126	August 21	Nationals	1–11	Corbin (10–5)	**Musgrove** (8–12)	—	10,577	52–74	L1
127	August 22	Nationals	1–7	Strickland (2–1)	**Brault** (3–3)	—	10,587	52–75	L2
128	August 23	Reds	3–2	**Vázquez** (4–1)	Iglesias (2–9)	—	20,091	53–75	W1
129	August 24	Reds	14–0	**Williams** (6–6)	Wood (1–3)	—	26,776	54–75	W2
130	August 25	Reds	9–8	**Agrazal** (3–3)	Bauer (10–11)	**Vázquez** (23)	22,349	55–75	W3
131	August 26	@ Phillies	5–6 (11)	Morin (1–0)	**Feliz** (2–4)	—	27,932	55–76	L1
132	August 27	@ Phillies	5–4	**Vázquez** (5–1)	Neris (2–5)	—	26,200	56–76	W1
133	August 28	@ Phillies	3–12	Velasquez (6–7)	**Keller** (1–3)	—	24,224	56–77	L1
134	August 29	@ Rockies	11–8	**Williams** (7–6)	Gonzalez (0–6)	**Vázquez** (24)	33,408	57–77	W1
135	August 30	@ Rockies	9–4	**Agrazal** (4–3)	Senzatela (8–9)	—	27,789	58–77	W2
136	August 31	@ Rockies	11–4	**Musgrove** (9–12)	Melville (1–1)	—	37,293	59–77	W3

**September: 10–16 (Home: 6–9; Away: 4–7)**

#	Date	Opponent	Score	Win	Loss	Save	Attendance	Record	Streak
137	September 1	@ Rockies	6–2	**Brault** (4–3)	Hoffman (1–5)	—	32,685	60–77	W4
138	September 3	Marlins	4–5 (10)	Conley (2–7)	**Markel** (0–1)	Ureña (1)	9,169	60–78	L1
139	September 4	Marlins	6–5	**Wang** (2–0)	Ureña (4–8)	—	9,043	61–78	W1
140	September 5	Marlins	7–10	Moran (1–0)	**Agrazal** (4–4)	—	9,642	61–79	L1
141	September 6	Cardinals	9–4	**Wang** (3–0)	Miller (4–5)	**Vázquez** (25)	19,090	62–79	W1
142	September 7	Cardinals	1–10	Wainwright (11–9)	**Brault** (4–4)	—	23,996	62–80	L1
143	September 8	Cardinals	0–2	Flaherty (10–7)	**Marvel** (0–1)	Martínez (19)	18,363	62–81	L2
144	September 9	@ Giants	6–4	**Rodríguez** (4–5)	Abad (0–2)	**Vázquez** (26)	26,826	63–81	W1
145	September 10	@ Giants	4–5	Cueto (1–0)	**Keller** (1–4)	Anderson (1)	26,877	63–82	L1
146	September 11	@ Giants	6–3	**Feliz** (3–4)	Webb (1–2)	**Vázquez** (27)	26,627	64–82	W1
147	September 12	@ Giants	4–2	**Musgrove** (10–12)	Samardzija (10–12)	**Vázquez** (28)	30,918	65–82	W2
148	September 13	@ Cubs	8–17	Lester (13–10)	**Brault** (4–5)	Mills (1)	39,080	65–83	L1
149	September 14	@ Cubs	1–14	Hendricks (11–9)	**Marvel** (0–2)	—	39,928	65–84	L2
150	September 15	@ Cubs	6–16	Wieck (1–1)	**Williams** (7–7)	—	39,103	65–85	L3
151	September 17	Mariners	0–6	Gonzales (16–11)	**Keller** (1–5)	—	10,933	65–86	L4
152	September 18	Mariners	1–4	Milone (4–9)	**Agrazal** (4–5)	Magill (5)	9,875	65–87	L5
153	September 19	Mariners	5–6 (11)	Brennan (3–6)	**Holmes** (1–2)	Swanson (1)	12,543	65–88	L6
154	September 20	@ Brewers	1–10	Anderson (7–4)	**Brault** (4–6)	—	43,390	65–89	L7
155	September 21	@ Brewers	1–10	Suter (3–0)	**Marvel** (0–3)	—	42,888	65–90	L8
156	September 22	@ Brewers	3–4	González (3–2)	**Williams** (7–8)	Hader (35)	43,321	65–91	L9
157	September 24	Cubs	9–2	**Liriano** (5–3)	Hendricks (11–10)	—	9,989	66–91	W1
158	September 25	Cubs	4–2	**Feliz** (4–4)	Wieck (1–2)	**Kela** (1)	10,592	67–91	W2
159	September 26	Cubs	9–5	**Musgrove** (11–12)	Quintana (13–9)	—	10,529	68–91	W3
160	September 27	Reds	6–5	**Ríos** (1–0)	Iglesias (3–12)	—	18,544	69–91	W4
161	September 28	Reds	2–4 (12)	Alaniz (1–0)	**McRae** (0–4)	—	21,084	69–92	L1
162	September 29	Reds	1–3	Mahle (3–12)	**Williams** (7–9)	Lorenzen (7)	23,617	69–93	L2

Legend: = Win = Loss = Postponement
Bold = Pirates team member

== Roster ==
2019 Pittsburgh Pirates
Roster
Pitchers: 67 Darío Agrazal; 24 Chris Archer; 43 Steven Brault; 57 Nick Burdi; 30 Kyle Crick; 62 Rookie Davis; 64 Montana DuRapau; 77 Luis Escobar; 45 Michael Feliz; 72 Geoff Hartlieb; 52 Clay Holmes; 79 Williams Jerez; 35 Keone Kela; 23 Mitch Keller; 49 Nick Kingham; 47 Francisco Liriano; 31 Jordan Lyles; 70 Tyler Lyons; 49 Parker Markel; 74 James Marvel; 63 Alex McRae; 59 Joe Musgrove; 66 Dovydas Neverauskas; 70 Yefry Ramírez; 71 Yacksel Ríos; 48 Richard Rodríguez; 46 Chris Stratton; 50 Jameson Taillon; 73 Felipe Vázquez; 78 Wei-Chung Wang; 34 Trevor Williams	Catchers: 61 Steven Baron; 29 Francisco Cervelli; 32 Elías Díaz; 58 Jacob Stallings; Infielders: 55 Josh Bell; 26 Adam Frazier; 2 Erik González; 16 Jung-ho Kang; 19 Colin Moran; 27 Kevin Newman; 36 José Osuna; 3 Cole Tucker	Outfielders: 53 Melky Cabrera; 12 Corey Dickerson; 68 Jake Elmore; 75 Corban Joseph; 44 Kevin Kramer; 6 Starling Marté; 51 Jason Martin; 25 Gregory Polanco; 15 Pablo Reyes; 10 Bryan Reynolds; 17 J. B. Shuck	Manager: 13 Clint Hurdle; Coaches: 86 Heberto Andrade (bullpen catcher); 18 Kimera Bartee (first base); 89 Jordan Comadena (bullpen catcher); 28 Joey Cora (third base); 81 Jacob Cruz (assistant hitting); 41 Rick Eckstein (hitting); 85 Dave Jauss (coach); 87 Justin Meccage (assistant pitching); 14 Tom Prince (bench); 56 Euclides Rojas (bullpen); 54 Ray Searage (pitching)

=== Opening Day lineup ===
Opening Day Starters
Name	Position
Adam Frazier	2B
Melky Cabrera	RF
Corey Dickerson	LF
Josh Bell	1B
Francisco Cervelli	C
Jung-ho Kang	3B
J. B. Shuck	CF
Erik González	SS
Jameson Taillon	SP

== Player stats ==
=== Batting ===
Note: G = Games played; AB = At bats; R = Runs; H = Hits; 2B = Doubles; 3B = Triples; HR = Home runs; RBI = Runs batted in; SB = Stolen bases; BB = Walks; AVG = Batting average; SLG = Slugging average

Player	G	AB	R	H	2B	3B	HR	RBI	SB	BB	AVG	SLG
Adam Frazier	152	554	80	154	33	7	10	50	5	40	.278	.417
Starling Marte	132	539	97	159	31	6	23	82	25	25	.295	.503
Josh Bell	143	527	94	146	37	3	37	116	0	74	.277	.569
Kevin Newman	130	493	61	152	20	6	12	64	16	28	.308	.446
Bryan Reynolds	134	491	83	154	37	4	16	68	3	46	.314	.503
Colin Moran	149	466	46	129	30	1	13	80	0	30	.277	.429
Melky Cabrera	133	378	43	106	22	1	7	47	2	17	.280	.399
Elías Díaz	101	303	31	73	14	0	2	28	0	23	.241	.307
José Osuna	95	261	41	69	20	0	10	36	0	18	.264	.456
Jacob Stallings	71	191	26	50	5	0	6	13	0	16	.262	.382
Jung-ho Kang	65	172	15	29	7	1	10	24	0	11	.169	.395
Gregory Polanco	42	153	23	37	8	1	6	17	3	12	.242	.425
Cole Tucker	56	147	16	31	10	3	2	13	0	10	.211	.361
Pablo Reyes	71	143	18	29	7	2	2	19	1	13	.203	.322
Erik González	53	142	15	36	4	1	1	6	4	9	.254	.317
Corey Dickerson	44	127	20	40	18	0	4	25	1	13	.315	.551
Francisco Cervelli	34	109	11	21	3	0	1	5	1	9	.193	.248
JB Shuck	27	47	4	10	0	1	0	2	1	8	.213	.255
Jake Elmore	20	47	3	10	1	0	0	4	0	2	.213	.234
Kevin Kramer	22	42	5	7	1	0	0	5	0	6	.167	.190
Jason Martin	20	36	5	9	2	0	0	2	2	4	.250	.306
Corban Joseph	9	11	1	2	1	0	0	0	0	0	.182	.273
Steven Baron	7	10	0	2	1	0	0	1	0	0	.200	.300
Pitcher totals	162	268	20	42	3	1	1	15	0	11	.157	.187
Team totals	162	5657	758	1497	315	38	163	722	64	425	.265	.420

=== Pitching ===
Note: W = Wins; L = Losses; ERA = Earned run average; G = Games pitched; GS = Games started; SV = Saves; IP = Innings pitched; H = Hits allowed; R = Runs allowed; ER = Earned runs allowed; BB = Walks allowed; SO = Strikeouts

Player	W	L	ERA	G	GS	SV	IP	H	R	ER	BB	SO
Joe Musgrove	11	12	4.44	32	31	0	170.1	168	98	84	39	157
Trevor Williams	7	9	5.38	26	26	0	145.2	162	93	87	44	113
Chris Archer	3	9	5.19	23	23	0	119.2	114	73	69	55	143
Steven Brault	4	6	5.16	25	19	0	113.1	117	69	65	53	100
Jordan Lyles	5	7	5.36	17	17	0	82.1	88	53	49	33	90
Darío Agrazal	4	5	4.91	15	14	0	73.1	82	43	40	18	41
Francisco Liriano	5	3	3.47	69	0	0	70.0	60	32	27	35	63
Richard Rodríguez	4	5	3.72	72	0	1	65.1	65	30	27	23	63
Felipe Vázquez	5	1	1.65	56	0	28	60.0	43	12	11	13	90
Michael Feliz	4	4	3.99	58	1	0	56.1	44	27	25	27	73
Clay Holmes	1	2	5.58	35	0	0	50.0	45	36	31	36	56
Kyle Crick	3	7	4.96	52	0	0	49.0	41	30	27	35	61
Mitch Keller	1	5	7.13	11	11	0	48.0	72	41	38	16	65
Chris Stratton	1	1	3.66	28	0	0	46.2	50	22	19	15	47
Jameson Taillon	2	3	4.10	7	7	0	37.1	34	24	17	8	30
Geoff Hartlieb	0	1	9.00	29	0	0	35.0	52	35	35	18	38
Nick Kingham	1	1	9.87	14	4	1	34.2	54	38	38	17	32
Keone Kela	2	0	2.12	32	0	1	29.2	19	7	7	11	33
Alex McCrae	0	4	8.78	11	2	0	26.2	36	30	26	16	19
Parker Markel	0	1	5.71	15	0	0	17.1	16	12	11	13	21
Montana DuRapau	0	1	9.35	14	2	0	17.1	27	24	18	9	22
James Marvel	0	3	8.31	4	4	0	17.1	25	16	16	6	9
Yefry Ramírez	0	0	7.71	9	0	0	14.0	19	15	12	7	16
Rookie Davis	0	1	6.75	5	1	0	10.2	12	8	8	8	10
Yacksel Ríos	1	0	5.23	10	0	0	10.1	10	6	6	5	10
Dovydas Neverauskas	0	0	10.61	10	0	0	9.1	15	11	11	7	10
Nick Burdi	2	1	9.35	11	0	0	8.2	11	9	9	3	17
Luis Escobar	0	0	7.94	4	0	0	5.2	10	5	5	4	2
Tyler Lyons	1	1	11.25	3	0	0	4.0	6	5	5	3	5
Wei-Chung Wang	2	0	6.75	5	0	0	4.0	5	3	3	3	2
Williams Jerez	0	0	7.36	6	0	0	3.2	5	3	3	3	5
José Osuna	0	0	3.86	2	0	0	2.1	3	1	1	0	0
Jacob Stallings	0	0	0.00	1	0	0	1.0	0	0	0	0	0
JB Shuck	0	0	0.00	1	0	0	1.0	1	0	0	1	0
Team totals	69	93	5.18	162	162	31	1440.0	1511	911	829	584	1443

=== Injured lists ===
==== 7-day injured list ====
Player	Injury	Placed	Activated
Francisco Cervelli	Concussion	May 26, 2019	June 4, 2019

==== 10-day injured list ====
Player	Injury	Placed	Activated
Elías Díaz	Virus	March 25, 2019	April 21, 2019
Jordan Lyles	Right Side Discomfort	March 25, 2019	April 4, 2019
Gregory Polanco	Left Shoulder Surgery Recovery	March 25, 2019	April 21, 2019
Dovydas Neverauskas	Left Oblique Strain	March 25, 2019	April 19, 2019
José Osuna	Lower Neck Discomfort	March 25, 2019	May 3, 2019
Lonnie Chisenhall	Right Index Finger Fracture	March 26, 2019	May 25, 2019
Corey Dickerson	Posterior Right Shoulder Strain	April 4, 2019	May 27, 2019
Kyle Crick	Right Triceps Tightness	April 4, 2019	April 16, 2019
Kevin Newman	Right Middle Finger Laceration	April 9, 2019	May 4, 2019
Starling Marte	Abdominal Wall Contusion	April 20, 2019	April 30, 2019
Jacob Stallings	Cervical Neck Strain	April 21, 2019	May 17, 2019
Nick Burdi	Right Bicep/Elbow Pain	April 23, 2019	May 11, 2019
Chris Archer	Right Thumb Inflammation	April 27, 2019	May 15, 2019
Jameson Taillon	Right Elbow Flexor Tendon Strain	May 4, 2019	May 13, 2019
Keone Kela	Right Elbow Inflammation	May 6, 2019	June 15, 2019
Jung-ho Kang	Left Side Strain	May 13, 2019	June 8, 2019
Trevor Williams	Right Side Strain	May 17, 2019	June 19, 2019
Chris Stratton	Right Side Discomfort	May 25, 2019	June 18, 2019
Francisco Cervelli	Concussion	June 4, 2019	July 24, 2019
Rookie Davis	Right Middle Finger Blister	June 8, 2019	July 27, 2019
Jordan Lyles	Left Hamstring Tightness	June 9, 2019	June 29, 2019
Gregory Polanco	Posterior Left Shoulder Strain	June 19, 2019	August 31, 2019
Steven Brault	Left Shoulder Strain	July 6, 2019	August 6, 2019
Clay Holmes	Right Triceps Inflammation	July 24, 2019	August 11, 2019
Richard Rodríguez	Right Shoulder Inflammation	August 10, 2019	August 20, 2019
Chris Archer	Right Shoulder Inflammation	August 21, 2019	September 16, 2019
Clay Holmes	Left Quadriceps Discomfort	August 21, 2019	September 1, 2019
Chris Stratton	Right Side Inflammation	August 29, 2019	September 17, 2019
Yefry Ramírez	Right Calf Strain	August 29, 2019	September 8, 2019

==== 60-day injured list ====
Player	Injury	Placed	Activated
Chad Kuhl	Recovering from Tommy John surgery	March 1, 2019	November 4, 2019
Edgar Santana	Right Elbow Tommy John surgery	March 28, 2019	November 4, 2019
Erik González	Left Clavicle Fracture	April 20, 2019	August 2, 2019
Nick Burdi	Right Bicep/Elbow Pain	May 11, 2019	November 4, 2019
Jameson Taillon	Right Elbow Flexor Tendon Strain	May 13, 2019	November 4, 2019
Lonnie Chisenhall	Right Index Finger Fracture	May 25, 2019	October 31, 2019
Corey Dickerson	Posterior Right Shoulder Strain	May 27, 2019	June 8, 2019
Keone Kela	Right Elbow Inflammation	June 15, 2019	July 23, 2019
Francisco Cervelli	Concussion	July 24, 2019	August 22, 2019
Rookie Davis	Right Middle Finger Blister	July 27, 2019	August 13, 2019
Gregory Polanco	Posterior Left Shoulder Inflammation	August 31, 2019	November 4, 2019
Jason Martin	Left Shoulder Dislocation	September 8, 2019	November 4, 2019
Kyle Crick	Right Hand Surgery	September 13, 2019	November 4, 2019
Chris Archer	Right Shoulder Inflammation	September 16, 2019	November 4, 2019

== Notable achievements ==
=== Awards ===
National League Player of the Month

- Josh Bell (May)

== Farm system ==
Level	Team	League	Manager
AAA	Indianapolis Indians	International League	Brian Esposito
AA	Altoona Curve	Eastern League	Michael Ryan
A	Bradenton Marauders	Florida State League	Wyatt Toregas
A	Greensboro Grasshoppers	South Atlantic League	Miguel Perez
Short-Season A	West Virginia Black Bears	New York–Penn League	Drew Saylor
Rookie	Bristol Pirates	Appalachian League	Kieran Mattison
Rookie	GCL Pirates	Gulf Coast League	Gera Alvarez
Rookie	DSL Pirates 1	Dominican Summer League	Stephen Morales
Rookie	DSL Pirates 2	Dominican Summer League	Shawn Bowman
