= Bryan Reynolds (baseball) =

American baseball player (born 1995)

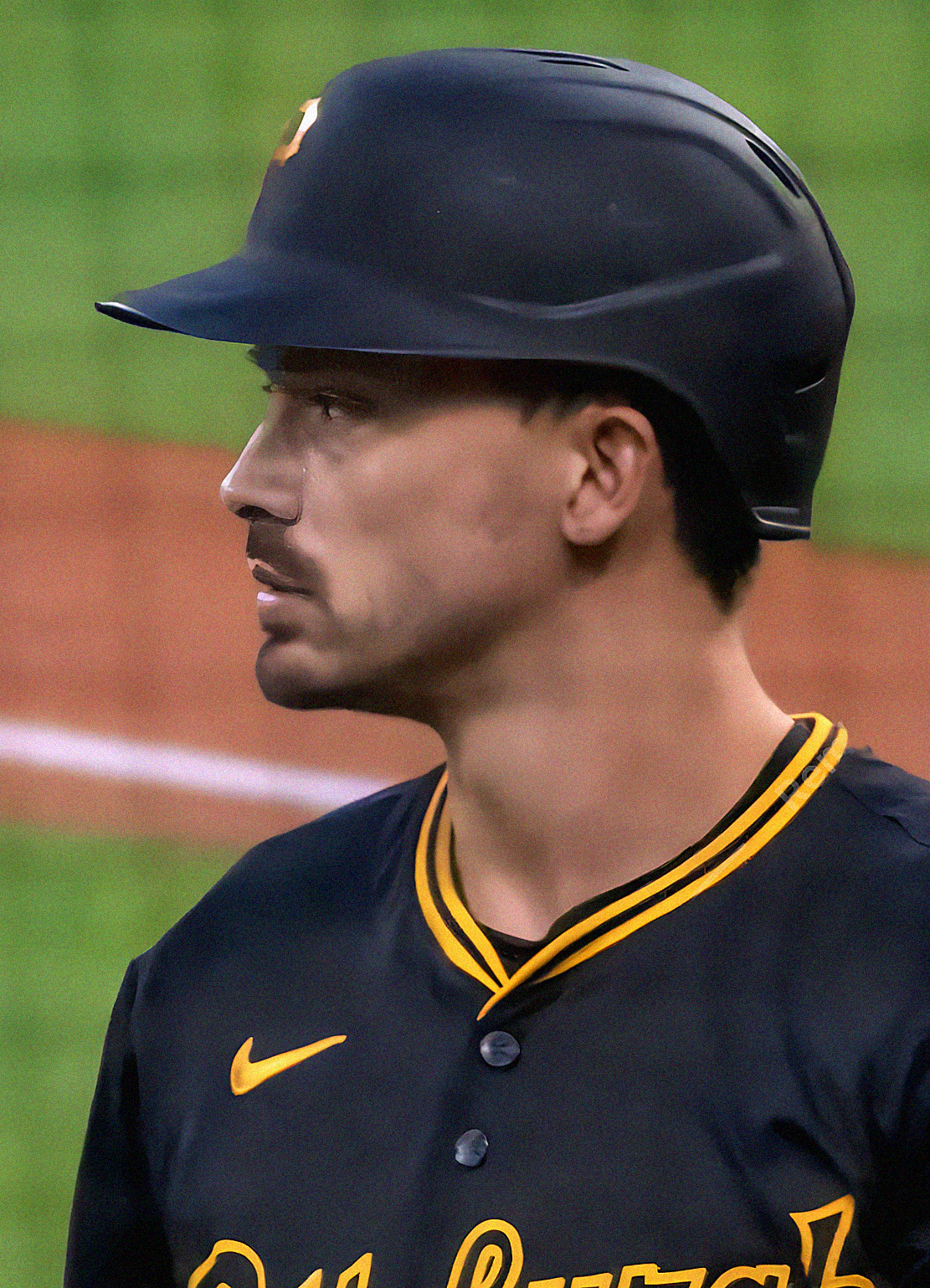
- Reynolds with the Pittsburgh Pirates

Pittsburgh Pirates – No. 10
- Outfielder
- Born: January 27, 1995 (age 31); Baltimore, Maryland, U.S.
- Bats: Switch Throws: Right

MLB debut
- April 20, 2019, for the Pittsburgh Pirates

MLB statistics (through September 20, 2026)
- Batting average: .270
- Home runs: 155
- Runs batted in: 555
- Stats at Baseball Reference

Teams
- Pittsburgh Pirates (2019–present)

Career highlights and awards
- 2× All-Star (2021, 2024)

Bryan Patrick Reynolds (born January 27, 1995) is an American professional baseball outfielder for the Pittsburgh Pirates of Major League Baseball (MLB). Reynolds played college baseball for the Vanderbilt Commodores, and the San Francisco Giants selected him with the 59th pick in the 2016 MLB draft. The Giants traded him to the Pirates in 2018. He made his MLB debut in 2019 and has been selected as an All-Star in 2021 and 2024.

== Early life and amateur career ==
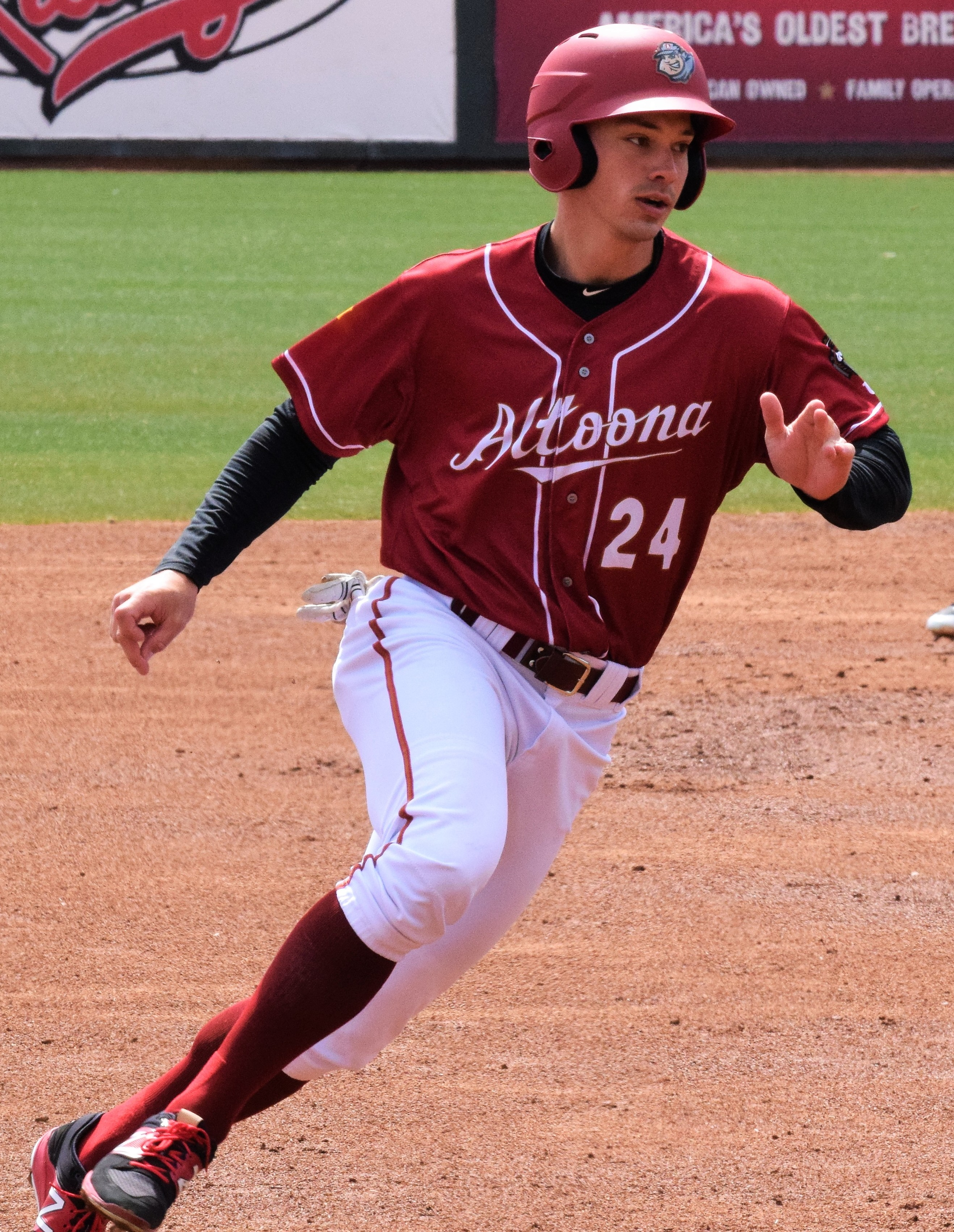
Reynolds with the Altoona Curve

Bryan Patrick Reynolds was born on January 27, 1995, in Baltimore, Maryland. He attended Brentwood High School in Brentwood, Tennessee and Vanderbilt University, where he played college baseball for the Vanderbilt Commodores.

As a freshman at Vanderbilt in 2014, Reynolds played in 72 games and hit .338/.395/.480 with four home runs and 54 runs batted in (RBIs), helping Vanderbilt win the College World Series championship. As a sophomore, he played in 72 games, hitting .318/.388/.462 with five home runs and 49 RBI. After the 2015 season, he played collegiate summer baseball with the Orleans Firebirds of the Cape Cod Baseball League. As a junior, he hit .330/.461/.603 with 13 home runs and 57 RBI.

== Professional career ==
=== Draft and minor leagues (2016–2018) ===
The San Francisco Giants selected Reynolds in the second round of the 2016 Major League Baseball draft. He signed and was assigned to the Salem-Keizer Volcanoes, where he made his professional debut. He was later promoted to the Augusta GreenJackets. In 56 total games between Salem-Keizer and Augusta, Reynolds batted .313 with six home runs, 38 RBIs, and a .847 OPS. He spent 2017 with the San Jose Giants, where he posted a .312 batting average with ten home runs and 63 RBIs in 121 games. He participated in the 2017 All-Star Futures Game.

On January 15, 2018, the Giants traded Reynolds, Kyle Crick, and $500,000 of international bonus slot money to the Pittsburgh Pirates in exchange for Andrew McCutchen and cash considerations. MLB.com ranked Reynolds as Pittsburgh's sixth best prospect going into the 2018 season. Reynolds began 2018 with the Pirates Double-A team the Altoona Curve. He was placed on the disabled list retroactive to April 9, underwent hand surgery in mid-April, and was activated on May 29. Reynolds played in 88 games for the Curve driving in 46 runs along with a .302 batting average. In 2019 he started the season with the Pirates Triple-A team the Indianapolis Indians.

=== Pittsburgh Pirates (2019–present) ===
On April 20, 2019, the Pirates promoted Reynolds to the major leagues. He made his major league debut that afternoon versus the San Francisco Giants and recorded his first career hit, a single, off Derek Holland. On April 30, he hit his first major league home run off Texas Rangers' reliever Jesse Chavez. Reynolds began his major league career with a hitting streak of 11 games. He finished the season fourth in National League Rookie of the Year voting, playing in 134 games.

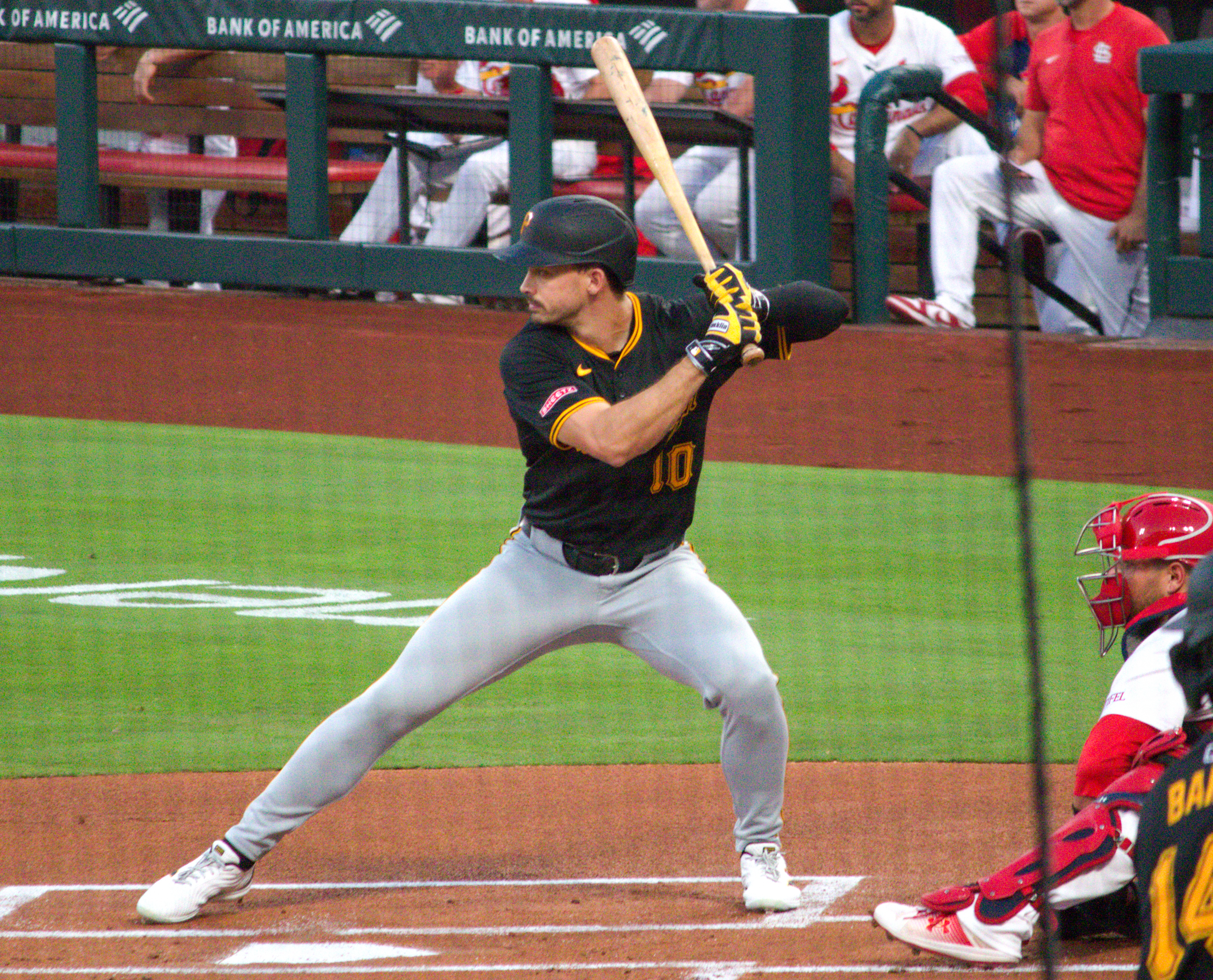
Bryan Reynolds at bat in St. Louis in 2024

In the pandemic-shortened 2020 season, Reynolds hit .189/.275/.357 with seven home runs and 19 RBIs in 55 games. His performance improved significantly the following season: he was one of two Pirates, along with Adam Frazier to play in the 2021 All-Star Game, where he started in center field and batted eighth. He finished the 2021 season hitting .302/.390/.522 with 24 home runs and 90 RBIs. He tied for the major league lead with eight triples.

On April 14, 2022, Reynolds signed a two-year contract worth $13.5 million with the Pittsburgh Pirates. On June 29, Reynolds hit three home runs in an 8–7 victory over the Washington Nationals. After a slow start to the season, Reynolds finished 2022 hitting .262/.345/.461 with 62 RBIs, and a career high 27 home runs.

In December 2022, Reynolds requested a trade from the Pirates, as Reynolds and the Pirates had not reached an agreement on a contract extension. On April 25, 2023, Reynolds and the Pirates reached an agreement on an 8-year contract worth $106.75 million. The contract broke the record for both the largest in Pirates history, as well as the largest for any MLB outfielder who was drafted out of college. Reynolds became the first player to sign a $100 million contract with the Pirates.

Reynolds was named to the 2024 All-Star Game.

Reynolds finished the 2025 season with 16 home runs, and a slash line of .245/.318/.402.

== Personal life ==
Reynolds is a Christian. Reynolds and his wife, Blair, had their first child, a son, in August 2020. They reside in the Nashville area.
