= James Marvel =

American baseball player (born 1993)

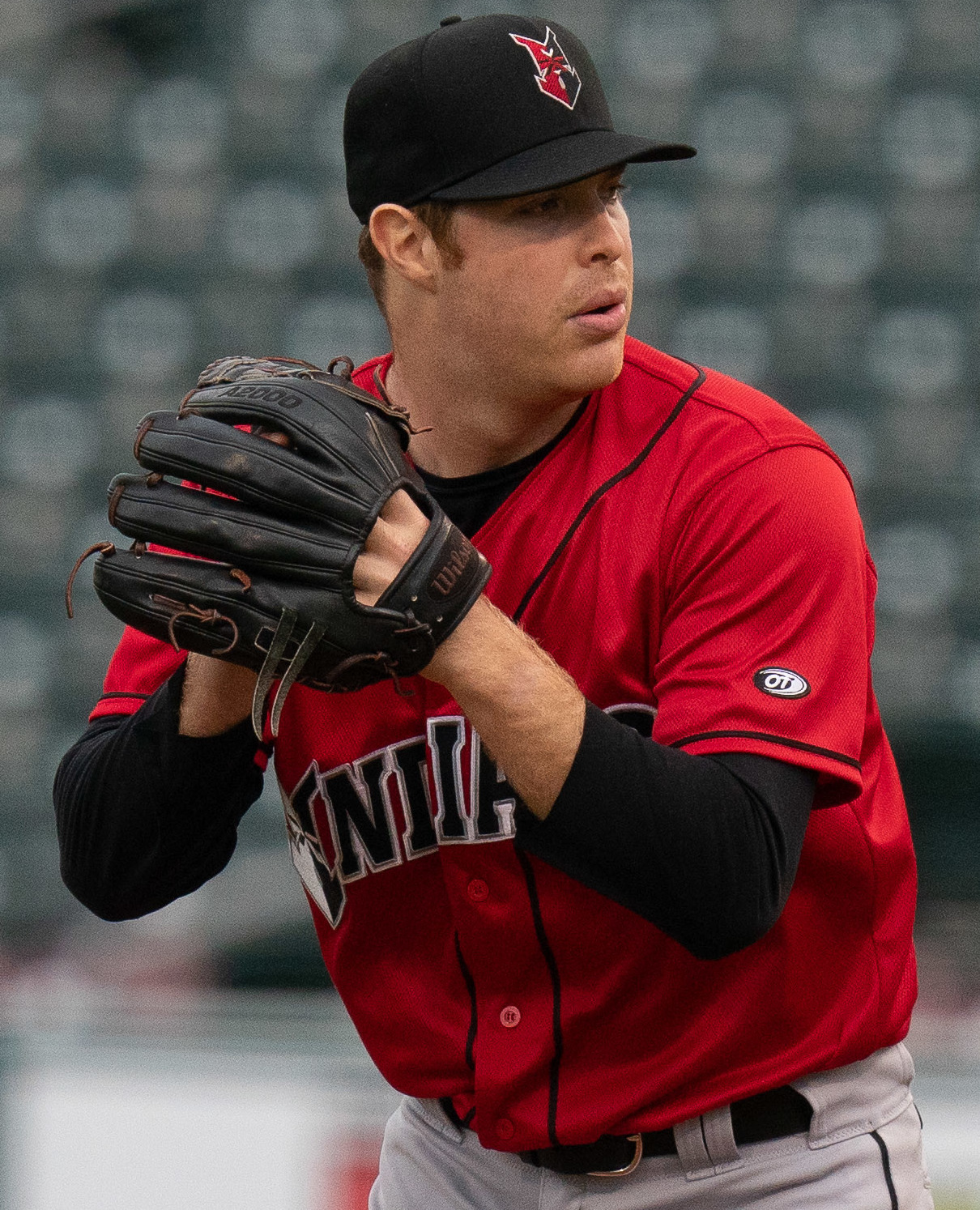
- Marvel with the Indianapolis Indians in 2021
- Pitcher
- Born: September 17, 1993 (age 32); San Francisco, California, U.S.
- Batted: Right Threw: Right

Professional debut
- MLB: September 8, 2019, for the Pittsburgh Pirates
- NPB: July 16, 2023, for the Hokkaido Nippon-Ham Fighters

Last appearance
- MLB: September 28, 2019, for the Pittsburgh Pirates
- NPB: August 28, 2023, for the Hokkaido Nippon-Ham Fighters

MLB statistics
- Win–loss record: 0–3
- Earned run average: 8.31
- Strikeouts: 9

NPB statistics
- Win–loss record: 2-2
- Earned run average: 2.49
- Strikeouts: 12
- Stats at Baseball Reference

Teams
- Pittsburgh Pirates (2019); Hokkaido Nippon-Ham Fighters (2023)

James Michael Marvel (born September 17, 1993) is an American former professional baseball pitcher. He has previously played in Major League Baseball (MLB) for the Pittsburgh Pirates, and in Nippon Professional Baseball (NPB) with the Hokkaido Nippon-Ham Fighters.

== Amateur career ==
Marvel attended Campolindo High School in Moraga, California, where he played baseball. In 2012, his senior year, he went 5–2 with a 1.33 ERA along with batting .456 with three home runs, earning All-State honors. He was selected by the Minnesota Twins in the 37th round of the 2012 Major League Baseball draft, but did not sign and instead enrolled at Duke University where he played college baseball for the Blue Devils.

In 2013, Marvel's freshman year at Duke, he appeared in ten games (eight starts) in which he went 4–2 with a 3.64 ERA in 42 innings. In 2014, he appeared in only four games due to an elbow injury, and in 2015, he did not play at all. Despite this, he was still drafted by the Pittsburgh Pirates in the 36th round of the 2015 Major League Baseball draft.

== Professional career ==
=== Pittsburgh Pirates ===
Marvel signed with the Pirates and made his professional debut with the West Virginia Black Bears, going 4–6 with a 4.43 ERA in 13 starts. In 2017, he began the season with the West Virginia Power before being promoted to the Bradenton Marauders in August; in 24 starts between the two clubs, Marvel went 7–8 with a 3.49 ERA, striking out 91 batters in 118 2/3 innings.

In 2018, he pitched for both Bradenton and the Altoona Curve, compiling a 12–7 record and 3.55 ERA in 27 games (26 starts), and in 2019, he began the year with Altoona (with whom he was named an Eastern League All-Star) before being promoted to the Indianapolis Indians in July. Over 28 starts between the two clubs during the 2019 season, Marvel went 16–5 with a 2.94 ERA, striking out 136 over 162 1/3 innings. His 16 wins and two shutouts both led the minor leagues in 2019.

On September 8, 2019, the Pirates selected Marvel's contract and promoted him to the major leagues. He made his major league debut that day versus the St. Louis Cardinals, allowing two runs over five innings pitched. Marvel did not appear in a game in 2020, and spent all of the 2021 season with the Indians, going 7–7 with a 5.26 ERA and 98 strikeouts over 131 2/3 innings. He elected free agency on November 7, 2021.

=== Philadelphia Phillies ===
On March 8, 2022, Marvel signed a minor league contract with the Philadelphia Phillies. Marvel made 35 appearances (nine starts) for the Triple-A Lehigh Valley IronPigs, registering a 6–7 record and 6.05 ERA with 62 strikeouts in 93 2/3 innings pitched. He elected free agency following the season on November 10.

=== High Point Rockers ===
On April 28, 2023, Marvel signed with the High Point Rockers of the Atlantic League of Professional Baseball. He made one start for the team and allowed three runs four hits, one walk, and three strikeouts in five innings pitched.

=== Texas Rangers ===
On May 7, 2023, Marvel signed a minor league contract with the Texas Rangers organization. In 6 starts for the Triple-A Round Rock Express, he struggled to a 7.88 ERA with 15 strikeouts in 24.0 innings pitched. Marvel was released by the Rangers on June 11.

=== Hokkaido Nippon-Ham Fighters ===
On June 19, 2023, Marvel signed with the Hokkaido Nippon-Ham Fighters of Nippon Professional Baseball. In 8 games for the Fighters, he registered a 2.49 ERA with 12 strikeouts across 21 2/3 innings of work. Marvel became a free agent following the 2023 season.
