= Montana DuRapau =

American baseball player (born 1992)

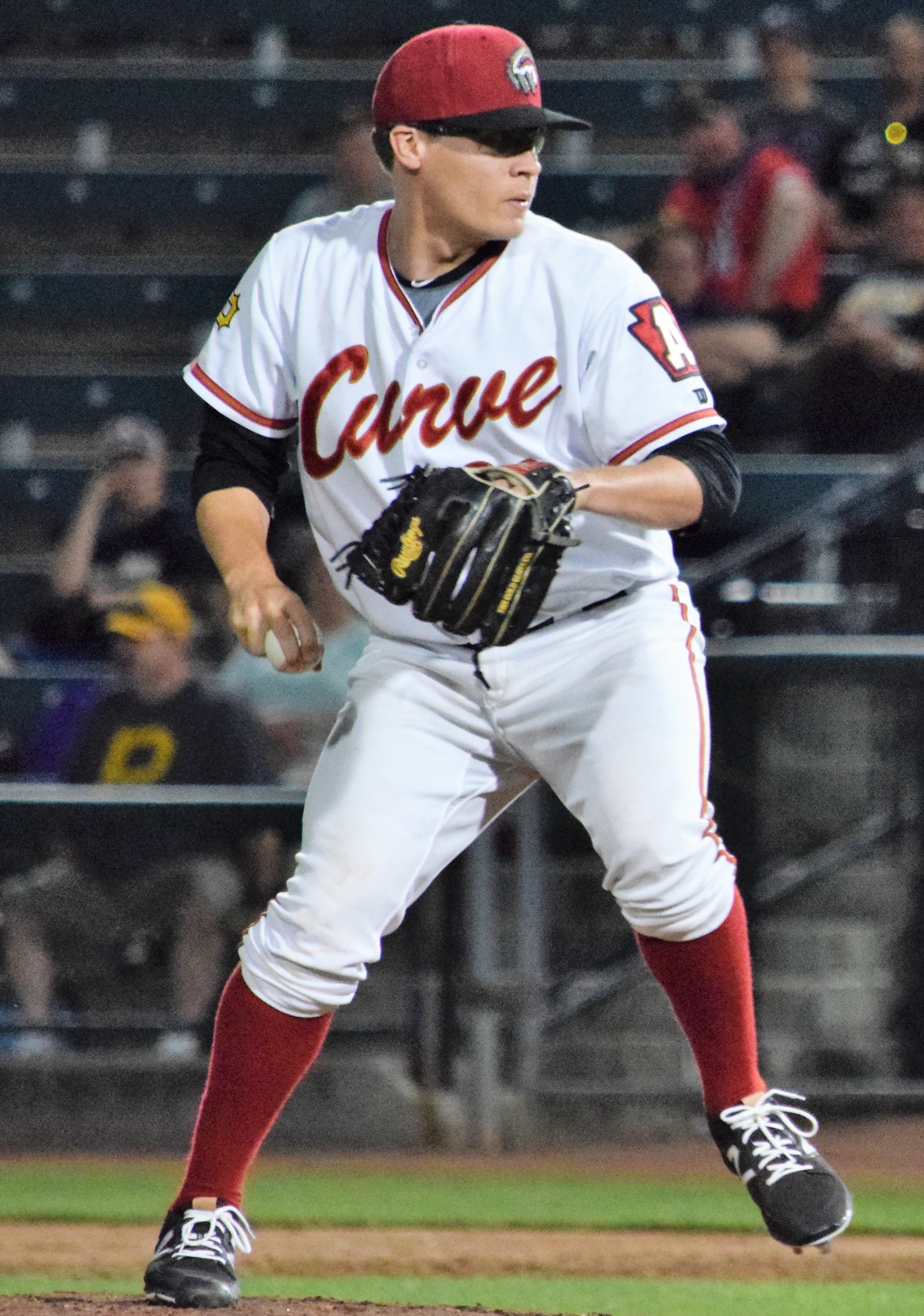
- DuRapau with the Altoona Curve in 2017
- Pitcher
- Born: March 27, 1992 (age 34); Deltona, Florida, U.S.
- Batted: Right Threw: Right

MLB debut
- May 9, 2019, for the Pittsburgh Pirates

Last MLB appearance
- August 29, 2019, for the Pittsburgh Pirates

MLB statistics
- Win–loss record: 0–1
- Earned run average: 9.35
- Strikeouts: 22
- Stats at Baseball Reference

Teams
- Pittsburgh Pirates (2019)

Montana Robert DuRapau (/duːˈrɑːpoʊ/ doo-RAH-poh; born March 27, 1992) is an American former professional baseball pitcher. He played in Major League Baseball (MLB) for the Pittsburgh Pirates in 2019.

== Career ==
DuRapau attended Deltona High School in Deltona, Florida. He played college baseball for four years at Bethune–Cookman University (2011–2014).

=== Pittsburgh Pirates ===
He was drafted by the Pittsburgh Pirates in the 32nd round, 971st overall, of the 2014 MLB draft.

He made his professional debut in 2014 with the Jamestown Jammers, going 3–2 with a 2.21 ERA in 61 innings. He split the 2015 season between the West Virginia Power, the Bradenton Marauders, and the Altoona Curve, combining to go 5–1 with a 1.38 ERA in 71.1 innings. He spent 2016 back with Altoona, going 3–3 with a 3.65 ERA in 49 innings. He played for the Surprise Saguaros of the Arizona Fall League during the 2016 offseason. His 2017 season was split between Altoona and the Indianapolis Indians, going 3–2 with a 2.04 ERA in 52.1 innings. He appeared in 4 games for the Toros del Este of the Dominican Winter League in the 2017 offseason. In January 2018, DuRapau was suspended 50 games for a positive test for a drug of abuse. He split the 2018 season between Altoona and Indianapolis, going 1–2 with a 5.28 ERA in 30 innings.

He opened the 2019 season back with Indianapolis. On May 9, his contract was selected and he was recalled to the major league roster. He made his debut that night, pitching two innings of relief versus the St. Louis Cardinals. DuRapau was outrighted off the Pirates roster on November 27. He did not play in a game in 2020 due to the cancellation of the minor league season because of the COVID-19 pandemic. DuRapau became a free agent on November 2, 2020.

=== Oakland Athletics ===
On November 11, 2020, DuRapau signed a minor league contract with the Oakland Athletics organization. DuRapau spent the 2021 season with the Triple-A Midland RockHounds. He pitched in 37 games, going 4–1 with a 3.98 ERA and 40 strikeouts. He elected free agency following the season.

On January 31, 2022, DuRapau announced his retirement.
