= Wei-Chung Wang =

Taiwanese baseball player (born 1992)

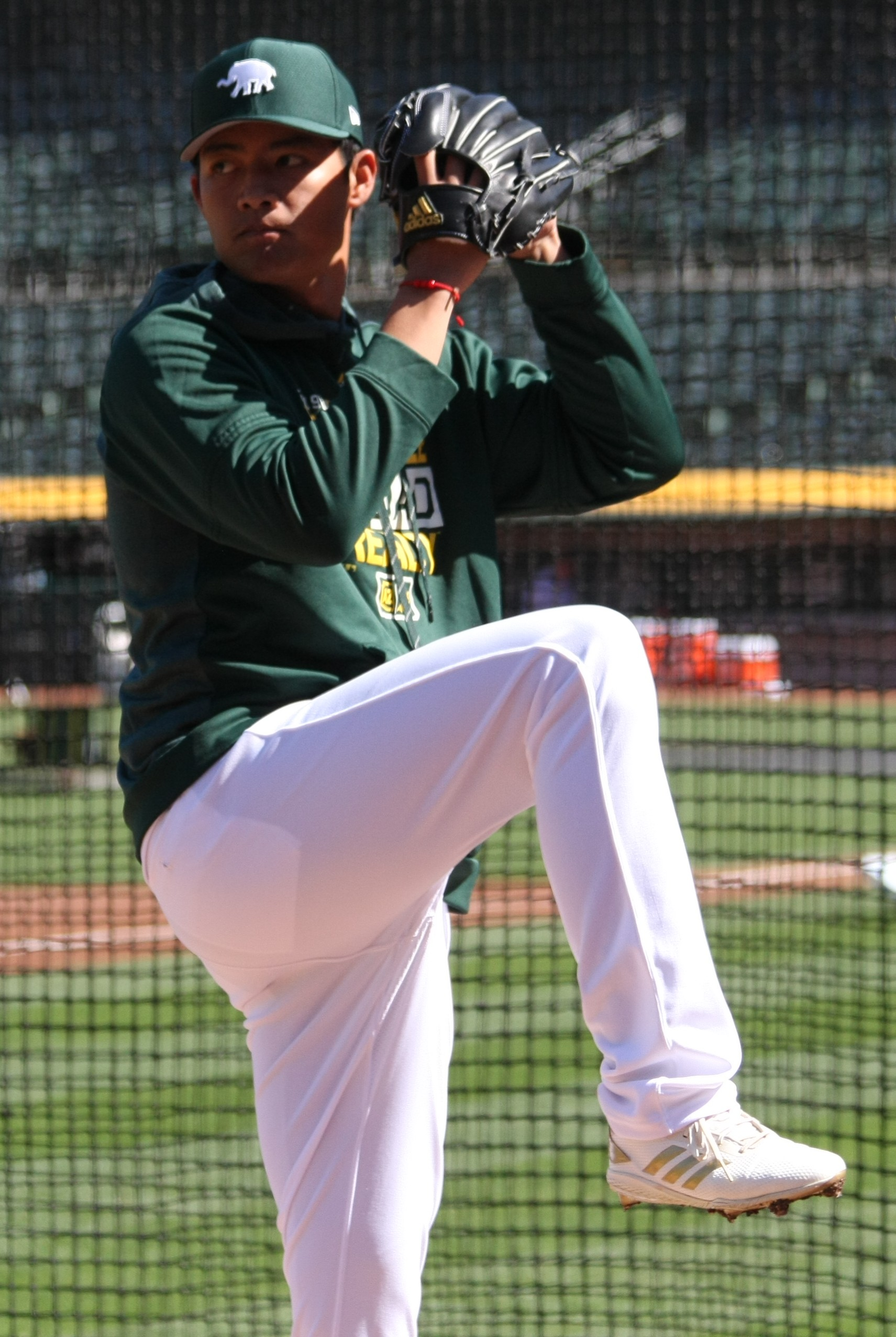
- Wang pitching for the Oakland Athletics in 2019

TSG Hawks – No. 62
- Pitcher
- Born: April 25, 1992 (age 34); Taitung County, Taiwan
- Bats: Left Throws: Left

Professional debut
- MLB: April 14, 2014, for the Milwaukee Brewers
- KBO: March 24, 2018, for the NC Dinos
- CPBL: March 14, 2021, for the Wei Chuan Dragons

MLB statistics (through 2019 season)
- Win–loss record: 3–0
- Earned run average: 6.52
- Strikeouts: 33

KBO statistics (through 2018 season)
- Win–loss record: 7–10
- Earned run average: 4.26
- Strikeouts: 108

CPBL statistics (through 2025 season)
- Win–loss record: 15–26
- Earned run average: 3.64
- Strikeouts: 279
- Stats at Baseball Reference

Teams
- Milwaukee Brewers (2014, 2017); NC Dinos (2018); Oakland Athletics (2019); Pittsburgh Pirates (2019); Wei Chuan Dragons (2021–2025); TSG Hawks (2026–present)

Career highlights and awards
- CPBL: Taiwan Series champion (2023)

Wei-Chung Wang (Chinese: 王維中, born April 25, 1992) is a Taiwanese professional baseball pitcher for the TSG Hawks of Taiwan's Chinese Professional Baseball League (CPBL). He has previously played in Major League Baseball (MLB) for the Milwaukee Brewers, Oakland Athletics, and Pittsburgh Pirates, in the KBO League for the NC Dinos, and in the CPBL for the Wei Chuan Dragons.

== Career ==
=== Pittsburgh Pirates ===
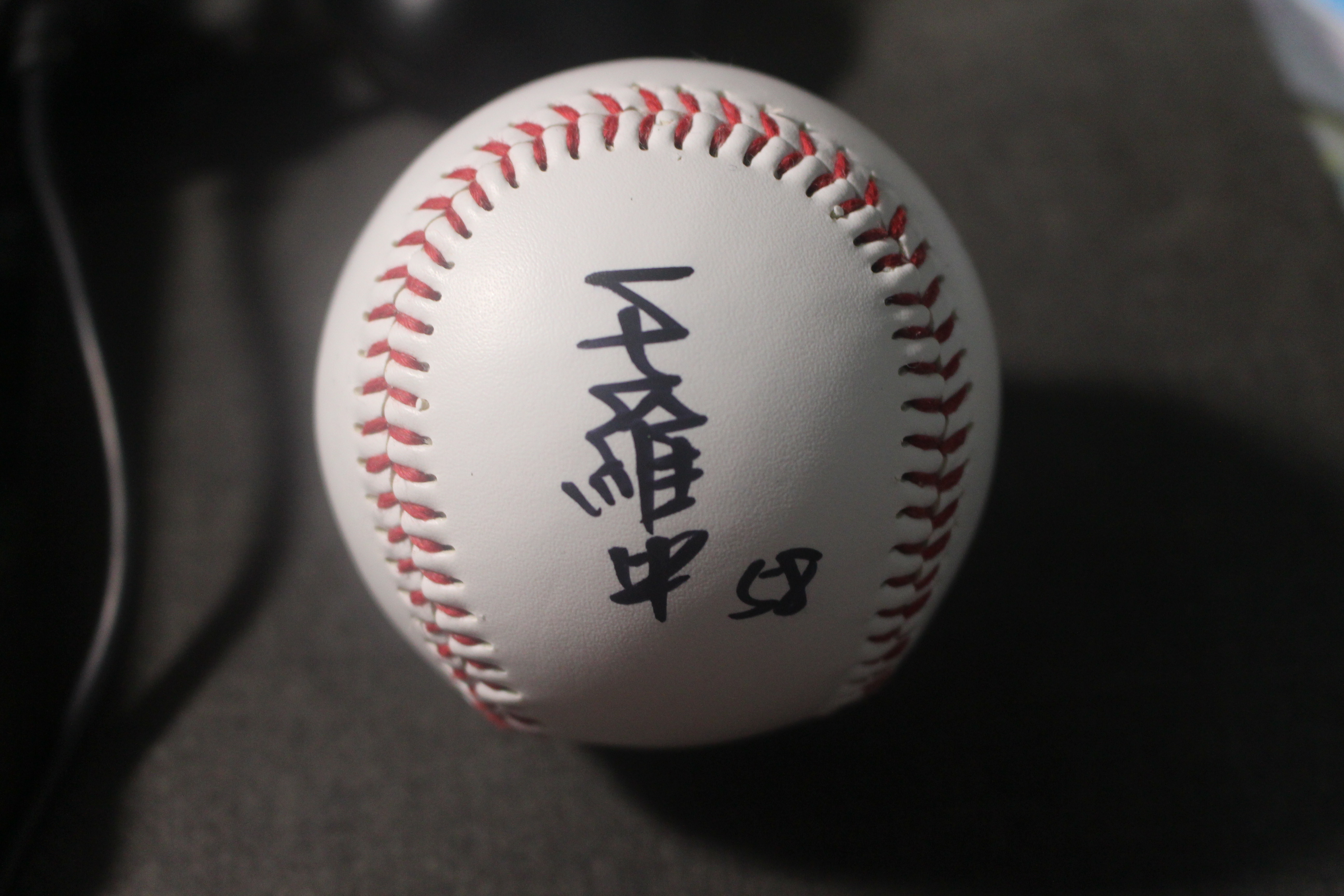
Wei-Chung Wang's signature

Wang signed as an international free agent with the Pittsburgh Pirates in 2011. When the Pirates discovered that Wang required Tommy John surgery, they voided the contract, and signed Wang to a new contract.

=== Milwaukee Brewers ===
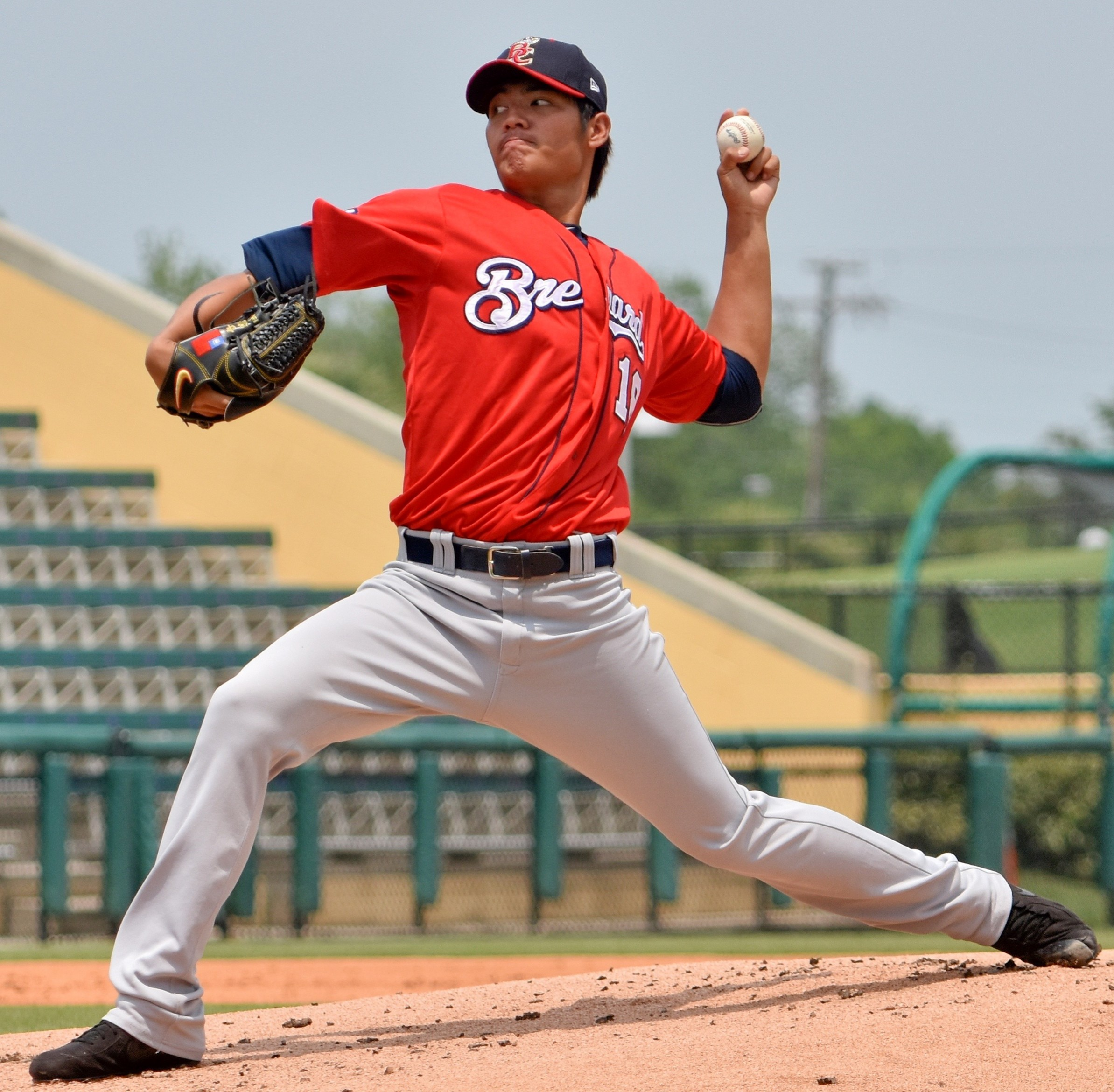
Wang pitching for the Brevard County Manatees in 2015

The Brewers selected Wang from the Pirates in the 2013 Rule 5 draft. Though a player is normally automatically ineligible for the Rule 5 draft in his first four professional seasons, Wang was eligible due to the voided contract. Wang competed for a spot on the Brewers' 2014 Opening Day roster, which he made. Wang made his MLB debut on April 14, 2014 against the St. Louis Cardinals pitching a scoreless inning, allowing one hit.

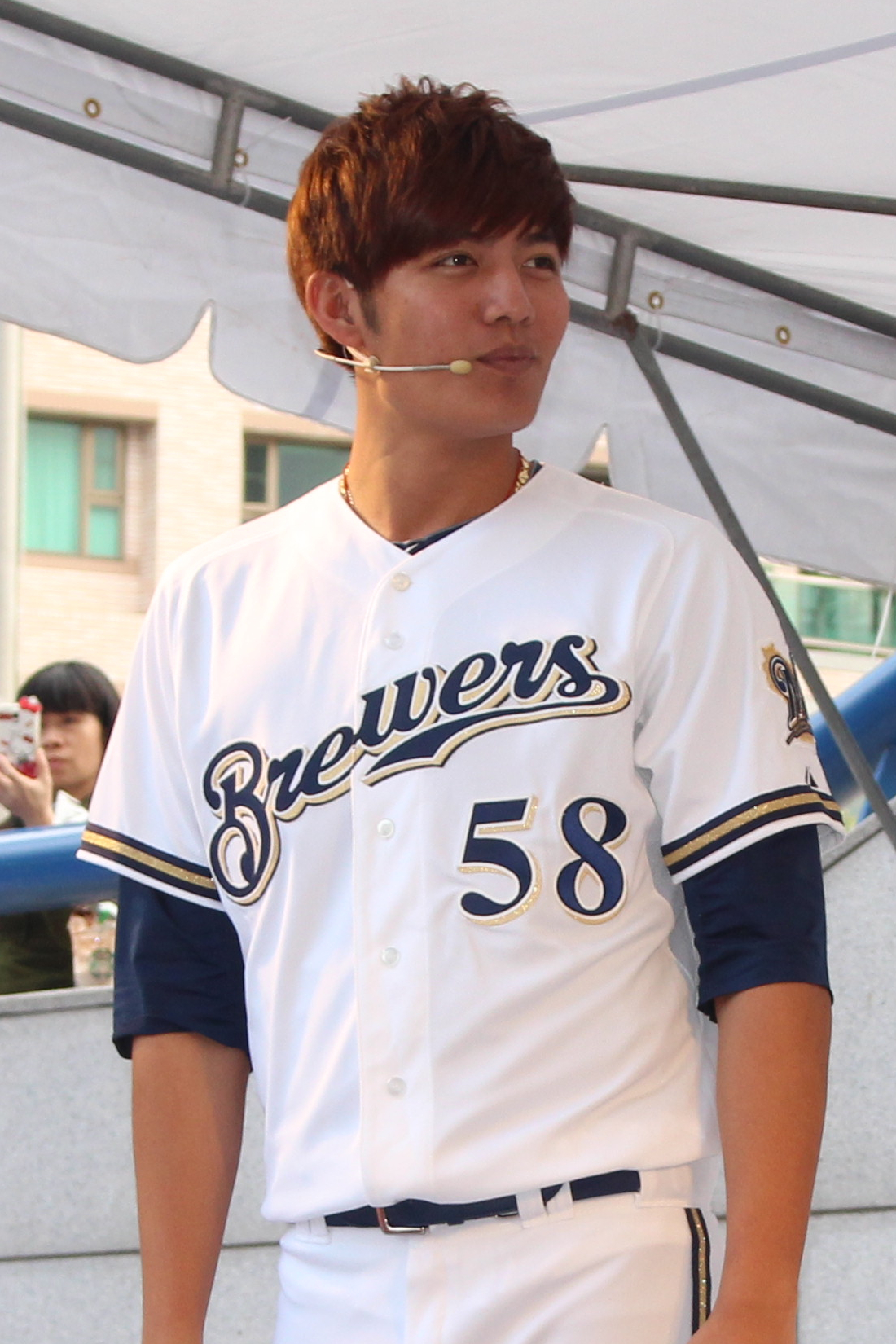
Wang in Taiwan, December 2015

During the 2015 season, Wang pitched for the Advanced-A Brevard County Manatees. He was designated for assignment by the Brewers on June 16, 2015. After three years in the minor leagues, the Brewers recalled Wang from Colorado Springs Sky Sox on July 30, 2017. He was granted his release from the Milwaukee Brewers in order to pursue a playing opportunity in South Korea, and was released on January 26, 2018.

=== NC Dinos ===
Wang was the first Taiwanese baseball player to play in the South Korean KBO League. He signed a one-year contract for $700,000 with the NC Dinos of the KBO League. The contract was announced by the Dinos on January 26. He became a free agent following the 2018 season.

=== Oakland Athletics ===
On February 1, 2019, Wang signed a minor league deal with the Oakland Athletics that included an invitation to spring training. On May 25, his contract was selected and he was called up to the major leagues. Wang became the first Taiwanese player in Athletics' franchise history three days later, when he pitched two scoreless innings against the Los Angeles Angels, allowing only one hit. On July 4, Wang earned his first MLB win, tossing 2 1/3 shutout innings in a 7–2 victory over the Minnesota Twins, during which he allowed one walk, no hits, and one strikeout. However, Wang struggled to establish himself as a reliable option outside of mop-up duty, and was optioned to the Triple-A Las Vegas Aviators on August 19, with a 3.33 ERA buoyed almost entirely by a microscopic 0.231 average against on balls put in play. On August 29, Wang was designated for assignment.

=== Pittsburgh Pirates (second stint) ===
On August 31, 2019, Wang was claimed off waivers by the Pittsburgh Pirates. He earned wins twice as a reliever. His MLB stats during the 2019 season was 3–0, with ERA 3.77 in 25 appearances. Wang was outrighted off the Pirates roster on November 2 and became a free agent two days later.

=== Wei Chuan Dragons ===
On July 20, 2020, Wang was selected first overall by the Wei Chuan Dragons in the 2020 Chinese Professional Baseball League draft, and returned to his native Taiwan as the first left-handed pitcher to be chosen with the first pick in the CPBL draft. In September 2020, Wang signed a 5-year, $2.08 million USD contract with the Dragons, the largest contract in Taiwanese professional baseball history.

On March 14, 2021, Wang made his CPBL debut as the Dragons' Opening Day pitcher against the Uni-President 7-Eleven Lions.

Wang pitched in the 2023 Taiwan Series, being the losing pitcher in Game 2 after allowing 4 hits and 2 walks and 4 earned runs across 2/3 innings. Wang also pitched 1 1/3 innings in Game 5, allowing 4 hits, including 1 home run, giving up 3 runs.

After accumulating a 15–26 win-loss record and a 3.64 ERA across 5 seasons, Wang requested to be excluded from the Dragons' 60-man roster after the 2025 playoffs, and was non-tendered by the Dragons after the 2025 season.

=== TSG Hawks ===
On December 24, 2025, Wang signed with the TSG Hawks.

== Personal life ==
He is the younger brother of former Chicago Cubs minor league player Wang Yao-lin. He is a member of the Amis people.

== See also ==
- List of Major League Baseball players from Taiwan
- Rule 5 draft results
