= Felipe Vázquez =

Venezuelan baseball player and sex offender (born 1991)

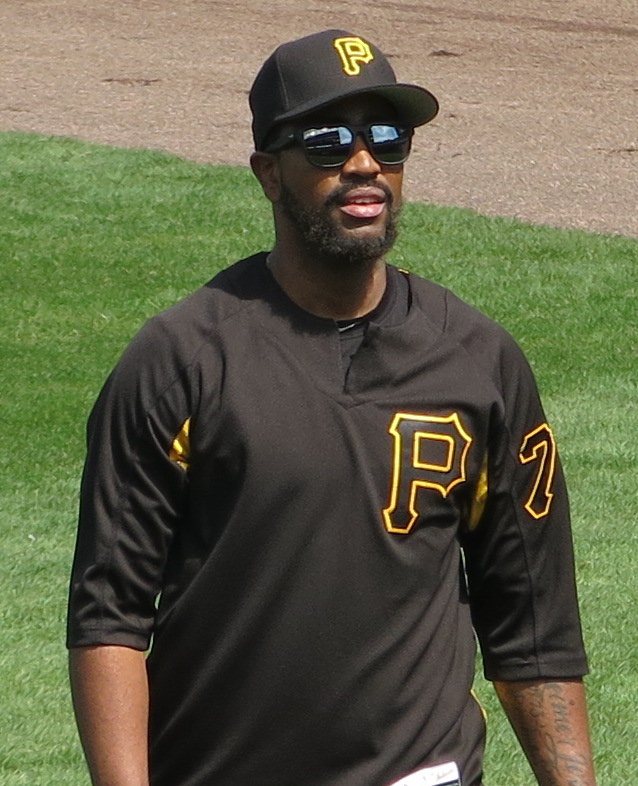
- Vázquez with the Pittsburgh Pirates in 2017

Marineros de Carabobo – No. 99
- Pitcher
- Born: July 5, 1991 (age 35); San Felipe, Yaracuy, Venezuela
- Batted: Left Threw: Left

MLB debut
- April 17, 2015, for the Washington Nationals

Last MLB appearance
- September 12, 2019, for the Pittsburgh Pirates

MLB statistics
- Win–loss record: 17–13
- Earned run average: 2.61
- Strikeouts: 402
- Saves: 89
- Stats at Baseball Reference

Teams
- Washington Nationals (2015–2016); Pittsburgh Pirates (2016–2019)

Career highlights and awards
- 2× All-Star (2018, 2019)

Felipe Javier Vázquez (born Felipe Javier Rivero Blanco on July 5, 1991) is a Venezuelan professional baseball pitcher for Marineros de Carabobo of the Venezuelan Major League. He played in Major League Baseball (MLB) from 2015 to 2019 for the Washington Nationals and the Pittsburgh Pirates. He was an All-Star in 2018 and 2019 before his arrest on child sexual assault charges led to his being placed on the restricted list by both the Pirates and Major League Baseball. He was convicted in 2021 and sentenced to two years in prison. He was deported soon after his release, effectively banning him from entering the United States and all but ending his MLB career.

== Professional career ==
=== Tampa Bay Rays (2008–2013) ===
==== Minor leagues ====
Vázquez signed with the Tampa Bay Rays as an international free agent on July 30, 2008. He spent his first two professional seasons with Venezuelan Summer League Rays, accumulating a 9-7 record and 2.74 ERA with 69 strikeouts and three saves across 85 1/3 innings pitched. Vázquez spent the 2011 campaign with the rookie-level Princeton Rays. In 14 appearances (12 starts) for the team, he registered a 3-3 record and 4.62 ERA with 57 strikeouts over 60 1/3 innings of work.

Vázquez represented the Rays at the 2012 All-Star Futures Game. He made 27 appearances (21 starts) for Single-A Bowling Green Hot Rods, compiling an 8-8 record and 3.41 ERA with 98 strikeouts across 113 1/3 innings pitched. On November 20, 2012, the Rays added Vázquez to their 40-man roster to protect him from the Rule 5 draft.

Vázquez spent the 2013 season with the High-A Charlotte Stone Crabs. He made 25 appearances (23 starts) for the Stone Crabs, accumulating a 9-7 record and 3.40 ERA with 91 strikeouts over 127 innings of work.

=== Washington Nationals (2014–2016) ===
On February 13, 2014, Vázquez was traded to the Washington Nationals, along with José Lobatón and Drew Vettleson, in exchange for Nate Karns. He suffered through elbow inflammation during the season, and was limited to 14 games started. After the 2014 regular season, the Nationals assigned Vázquez to the Mesa Solar Sox of the Arizona Fall League.

The Nationals transitioned Vázquez into a relief pitcher during spring training in 2015. Vázquez opened the 2015 season with the Syracuse Chiefs of the Triple-A International League.

==== Major leagues ====
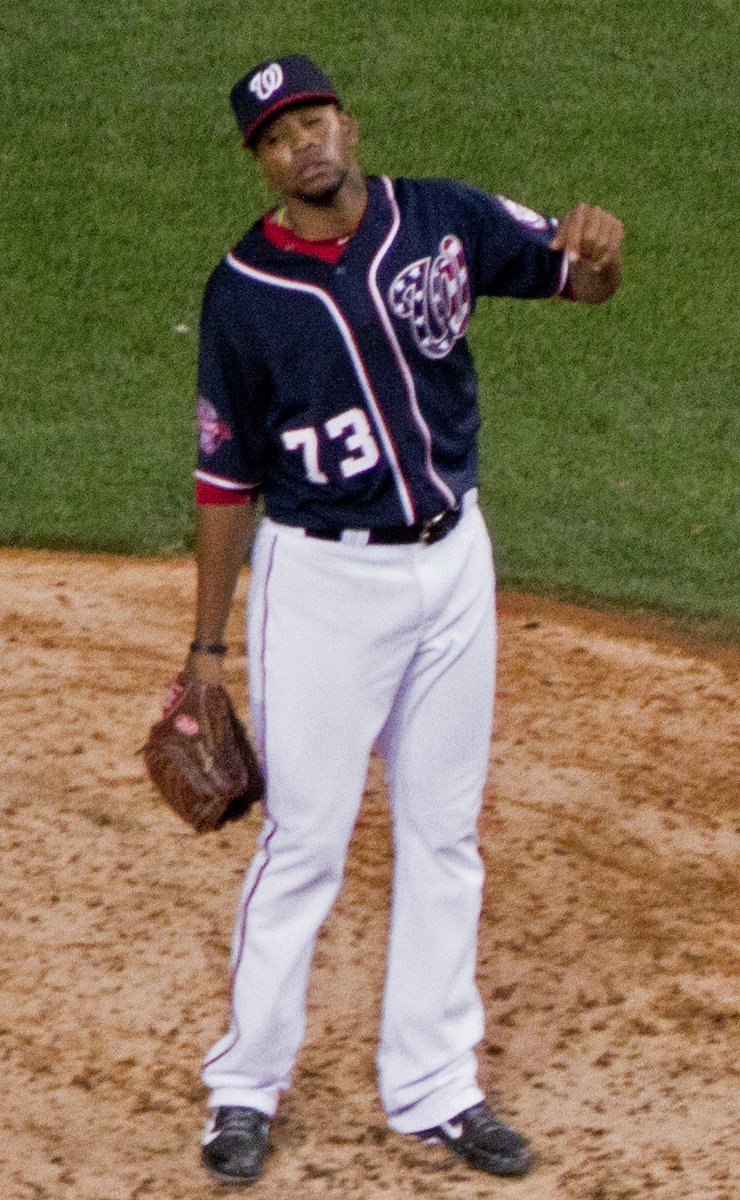
Vázquez with the Washington Nationals

On April 17, 2015, Vázquez made his major league debut by coming in to pitch the top of the ninth inning in a 7–2 win over the Philadelphia Phillies. He pitched one inning, allowing two hits and one run while striking out two batters. He went on the disabled list due to gastrointestinal bleeding on April 22. On June 1, the Nationals called up Vázquez to the major leagues from Syracuse. At the end of the season, Vázquez was able to reach 100 miles per hour (160 km/h) with his fastball in relief. In 49 games for the Nationals, he pitched in 48 1/3 innings, posting a 2–1 record with a 2.79 ERA. With Jonathan Papelbon suspended and Drew Storen injured, Vázquez converted two save opportunities during the final week of the season. He finished the season with a 2.79 earned run average.

During the 2016 season, Vázquez's ERA reached a peak at 6.82 following a game on June 18 where he allowed all six batters he faced to reach base. In the next 13 appearances, he had a 0.93 ERA to lower his season ERA to 4.53.

=== Pittsburgh Pirates (2016–2019) ===
==== 2016–17 ====
On July 30, 2016, the Nationals traded Vázquez, along with Taylor Hearn, to the Pittsburgh Pirates for Mark Melancon. For the Pirates, he finished with a 3.29 ERA in 28 games.

Vázquez began the 2017 season as a setup reliever. After a 0.58 ERA in 31 games, on June 9 he was named co-closer for the Pirates along with Juan Nicasio, replacing Tony Watson. Vázquez later assumed primary closing duties, with Nicasio becoming the eighth-inning setup man. Vázquez was 5–3 with a 1.67 ERA, and earned 21 saves in 23 opportunities in 2017. His fastest pitch of 2017 was 102.6 miles an hour, second-best in MLB only to pitches by Aroldis Chapman. Of all MLB pitchers, he held left-handed batters to the lowest batting average, .082 (in 20 or more innings).

==== 2018–19: All-Star seasons ====
Before the 2018 season, Vázquez signed a four-year contract with the Pirates, with club options for another two years. In 2018, Vázquez was selected to play in the 2018 All-Star Game, his first All-Star appearance. For the season, he was 4–2 with 37 saves and a 2.70 ERA.

In an April 7, 2019, game against the Cincinnati Reds, Vázquez was ejected after his role in a bench-clearing incident involving Chris Archer, Derek Dietrich, Yasiel Puig, Amir Garrett, Keone Kela, and David Bell. Vázquez was selected for the 2019 All-Star Game, as a roster replacement for Zack Greinke. On September 10, Vázquez and Kyle Crick got into a clubhouse fight; Crick broke his finger, requiring season-ending surgery. On September 17, the Pirates placed Vázquez on the restricted list, due to his arrest on multiple charges of unlawful contact with a minor. At the time, his record for the season was 5–1 with a 1.65 ERA and 28 saves. He was also placed on administrative leave by Major League Baseball. He was subsequently convicted on all charges and sentenced to two years in prison. He was then deported for committing a "crime involving moral turpitude," effectively ending his MLB career. It is nearly impossible for someone convicted of a "crime involving moral turpitude" to enter the United States, let alone obtain a work visa.

=== 2024: Liga Mayor de Béisbol Profesional ===
According to Vazquez's Instagram, he is currently playing for the Marineros de Carabobo of the Venezuelan Major League after having not pitched for five years.

== Pitching style ==
Vázquez throws a fastball which can reach over 100 miles per hour (160 km/h). Vázquez's fastball averaged 96.4 miles per hour (155.1 km/h) in 2016 and around 98 miles per hour (158 km/h) in 2017. As a prospect with the Rays, Vázquez initially threw only 86 miles per hour (138 km/h). He also throws an effective changeup at 89–90 miles per hour (143–145 km/h) with two-seam movement, which he picked up in the Rays minor league system. Vázquez began throwing it frequently in 2015, and uses it around 25 percent of the time. The pitch has been referred to as a "Bugs Bunny changeup" by Pirates pitching coach Ray Searage. Vázquez also throws a slider and a curveball.

== Personal life ==
In 2018, he changed his last name from Rivero to Vázquez to match the surname of his sister, citing that she had been a big part of his career. He changed his surname back to his birth surname of Rivero in 2024.

=== Child sexual abuse conviction ===
Vázquez was arrested on September 17, 2019, on charges of computer pornography, specifically alleging that he solicited a child and provided obscene material to minors, regarding an alleged sexual relationship he had with a 13-year-old female from Lee County, Florida. Hours later, Vázquez was charged with statutory sexual assault, unlawful contact with a minor, corruption of minors and indecent assault of a person less than 16 years old related to a separate incident in Westmoreland County, Pennsylvania. Vázquez admitted that in 2017, he had a sexual encounter with the girl when she was 13 years old. He also admitted to sending nude photos of himself and videos of himself engaged in sexual activities to the girl. An additional 21 felony charges (including ten counts of unlawful sexual contact with a minor, ten counts of child pornography, and one count of corruption of a minor) were announced on November 19, 2019, and Vazquez was denied bail. On May 29, 2020, it was reported that Vázquez faced another child pornography charge in St. Louis. Vázquez and his attorneys denied the charges, arguing that the alleged victim showed Vázquez an ID indicating she was at least 18, that he was never informed of his rights by police, and that he never actually confessed. Vázquez's attorneys sought to get the charges dropped in September 2020. Another motion to dismiss the charges was filed in late 2020, this time over jurisdictional issues relating to the state in which the crimes allegedly occurred.

Vázquez's trial commenced on May 17, 2021. On May 20, he was convicted on 15 counts stemming from the relationship with the girl, including: ten counts of sexual abuse of children, two counts of unlawful contact with a minor, one count of statutory sexual assault, one count of corruption of a minor, and one count of indecent assault of someone under 16 years old. Vázquez was sentenced to two to four years in state prison on August 17, 2021. He received credit for the 23 months he already served before his sentencing.

On March 13, 2023, the Superior Court of Pennsylvania denied Vázquez's appeal. U.S. Immigration and Customs Enforcement deported him to Venezuela on December 1, 2023.

== See also ==
- List of Major League Baseball players from Venezuela
