= Parker Markel =

American baseball player (born 1990)

- Pitcher
- Born: September 15, 1990 (age 35); Newport Beach, California, U.S.
- Batted: Right Threw: Right

MLB debut
- May 12, 2019, for the Seattle Mariners

Last MLB appearance
- June 4, 2022, for the Oakland Athletics

MLB statistics
- Win–loss record: 0–1
- Earned run average: 6.84
- Strikeouts: 27
- Stats at Baseball Reference

Teams
- Seattle Mariners (2019); Pittsburgh Pirates (2019); Oakland Athletics (2022)

Parker Michael Markel (born September 15, 1990) is an American former professional baseball pitcher. He played in Major League Baseball (MLB) for the Seattle Mariners, Pittsburgh Pirates, and Oakland Athletics.

== Career ==
Markel attended Mountain Ridge High School in Glendale, Arizona. He was drafted by the Detroit Tigers in the 32nd round of the 2009 MLB draft but did not sign. He attended Yavapai College in Prescott, Arizona in 2010.

=== Tampa Bay Rays ===
He was drafted by the Tampa Bay Rays in the 39th round of the 2010 MLB draft, and signed with them.

Markel spent the 2010 through 2016 seasons in the Rays organization. During his time with them, he played for the Gulf Coast League Rays, Hudson Valley Renegades, Bowling Green Hot Rods, Charlotte Stone Crabs, Montgomery Biscuits, and the Durham Bulls.

Markel split the 2016 campaign between Double–A Montgomery and Triple–A Durham, compiling a 7–3 record and 2.78 ERA with 58 strikeouts over 43 combined appearances. He elected free agency following the season on November 7, 2016.

=== Sioux City Explorers ===
Markel signed with the Lotte Giants of the KBO League during the 2016 offseason, but asked for and was given his release on March 27, 2017, after appearing in only one exhibition game for the Giants.

Markel signed a minor league contract with the Arizona Diamondbacks on December 18, 2017, but was released prior to the start of the season on March 25, 2018.

Markel subsequently signed with the Sioux City Explorers of the independent baseball American Association of Independent Professional Baseball, and spent the 2018 season with them.

=== Seattle Mariners ===
Markel signed a minor league contract with the Seattle Mariners on September 28, 2018. He opened the 2019 season with the Arkansas Travelers and the Tacoma Rainiers. On May 12, Markel's contract was selected and he was called up to the major leagues for the first time. He made his major league debut that day versus the Boston Red Sox. On July 23, 2019, Markel was designated for assignment.

=== Pittsburgh Pirates ===
On July 27, 2019, Markel was claimed off waivers by the Pittsburgh Pirates. He made 15 appearances for the Pirates, compiling an 0-1 record and 5.71 ERA with 21 strikeouts across 17 1/3 innings pitched.

=== Los Angeles Angels ===
On October 31, 2019, Markel was traded to the Los Angeles Angels in exchange for cash considerations. He was designated for assignment on February 10, 2020. Markel did not play in a game in 2020 due to the cancellation of the minor league season because of the COVID-19 pandemic. He became a free agent on November 2.

=== San Diego Padres ===
On November 17, 2020, Markel signed a minor league contract with the San Diego Padres organization. Markel spent the year with the Triple-A El Paso Chihuahuas, posting a 4.42 ERA with 91 strikeouts across 41 appearances. On September 22, 2021, Markel was released by San Diego.

=== Oakland Athletics ===
On March 5, 2022, Markel signed a minor league contract with the Oakland Athletics. The Athletics promoted Markel to the major leagues on May 29. He made 3 appearances out of the bullpen, giving up just 1 hit over 3 scoreless innings of work. Markel was designated for assignment on June 7, 2022, in order to make room for Matt Davidson on the team's 40-man roster.

=== Chicago White Sox ===
On June 8, 2022, Markel was claimed off waivers by the Chicago White Sox and optioned to the Triple-A Charlotte Knights. He was removed from the 40–man roster and sent outright to the Triple–A Charlotte Knights on July 29. In 24 games for Charlotte, Markel struggled to a 10.29 ERA with 27 strikeouts across 21 innings pitched. He was released by Chicago on August 31.

=== Hagerstown Flying Boxcars ===
On February 22, 2024, it was announced that Markel would be signing with the Hagerstown Flying Boxcars for their inaugural season of play in the Atlantic League of Professional Baseball. In 18 games (17 starts) for the team, he struggled to a 2–6 record and 6.28 ERA with 61 strikeouts over 76 innings of work. Markel became a free agent following the season.

== Personal life ==
Markel requested his release from the Lotte Giants in 2017 due to anxiety issues. He was out of professional baseball for the rest of 2017, and worked for a time at a Lululemon store and for a hot air balloon company. Markel suffered a concussion and a ruptured right eardrum after being struck by a batted ball during live batting practice, in spring training with the Sioux City Explorers in 2018.
