= Alex McRae =

American baseball player (born 1993)

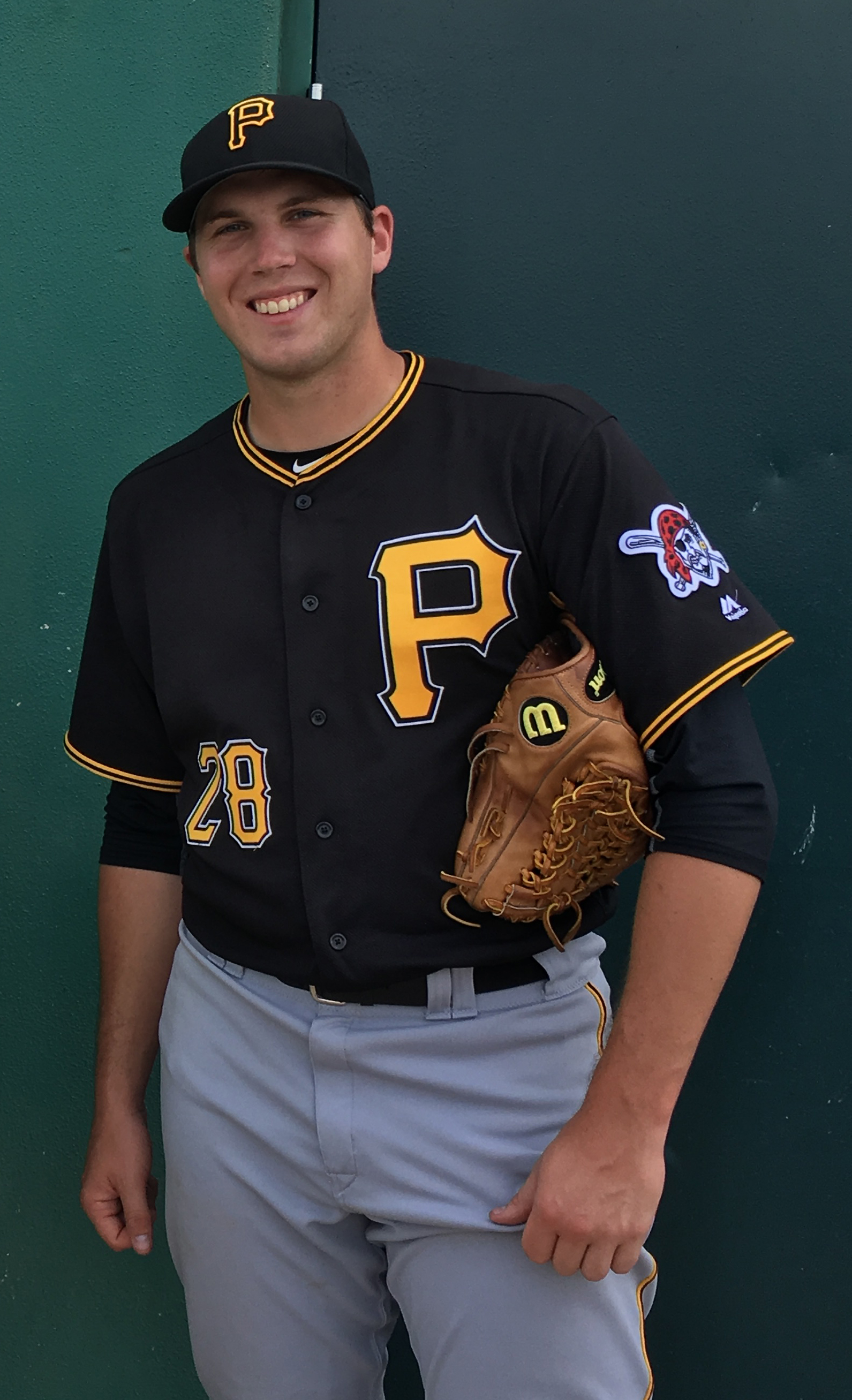
- McRae at Pirates Spring Training
- Pitcher
- Born: April 6, 1993 (age 33); West Allis, Wisconsin, U.S.
- Batted: Right Threw: Right

MLB debut
- August 1, 2018, for the Pittsburgh Pirates

Last MLB appearance
- May 14, 2021, for the Chicago White Sox

MLB statistics
- Win–loss record: 0–5
- Earned run average: 7.34
- Strikeouts: 27
- Stats at Baseball Reference

Teams
- Pittsburgh Pirates (2018–2019); Chicago White Sox (2020–2021)

Alexander James McRae (born April 6, 1993) is an American former professional baseball pitcher. He played in Major League Baseball (MLB) for the Pittsburgh Pirates and Chicago White Sox.

== Career ==
McRae attended Eisenhower High School in New Berlin, Wisconsin and played college baseball at Jacksonville University. As a junior, he was 5–7 with a 6.06 ERA in 16 games (15 starts).

=== Pittsburgh Pirates ===
After his junior year, he was drafted by the Pittsburgh Pirates in the 10th round of the 2014 Major League Baseball draft, and he signed.

After signing, McRae made his professional debut with the Jamestown Jammers where he was 3–6 with a 6.21 ERA in 15 starts. In 2015 he played for the West Virginia Power where he pitched to an 8–9 record and 4.98 ERA in 28 games (27 starts), and in 2016 he pitched for both the Bradenton Marauders and Altoona Curve, compiling a combined 11–10 record and 3.88 ERA in 28 games (27 being starts). He spent 2017 with Altoona where he was 10–5 with a 3.61 ERA in 27 games (25 starts). He began 2018 with the Indianapolis Indians.

McRae was called up to the majors for the first time on July 7, 2018. The Pirates designated him for assignment after the season. He had his contract selected on May 27, 2019. McRae was outrighted off the Pirates roster on November 4, and elected free agency on November 7.

=== Chicago White Sox ===
On January 8, 2020, McRae signed a minor league deal with the Chicago White Sox that included an invitation to spring training. His contract was purchased on September 5, 2020, and he was called up to the major leagues and made two relief appearances. He pitched three scoreless innings. McRae was designated for the assignment on September 29, the same day the White Sox were slated to play the Oakland Athletics in the Wild Card round.

McRae re-signed with the White Sox before the start of the 2021 season. The deal was a minor league contract with an invitation to spring training. On April 20, 2021, McRae was selected to the active roster. McRae recorded a 4.50 ERA in 2 appearances with Chicago before being outrighted off of the 40-man roster on June 26. On October 8, McRae elected free agency.

=== Lake Country DockHounds ===
On January 25, 2022, McRae signed with the Lake Country DockHounds of the American Association of Professional Baseball. McRae started 14 games for Lake Country, pitching to a 5-4 record and 4.01 ERA with 78 strikeouts in 83.0 innings of work, and was named an American Association All-Star.

McRae made 3 appearances (1 start) for the DockHounds in 2023, struggling to an 11.25 ERA with 3 strikeouts in 4.0 innings pitched. A shoulder injury would end his career and on June 21, 2023, McRae was released by the team.
