= Kyle Crick =

American baseball player (born 1992)

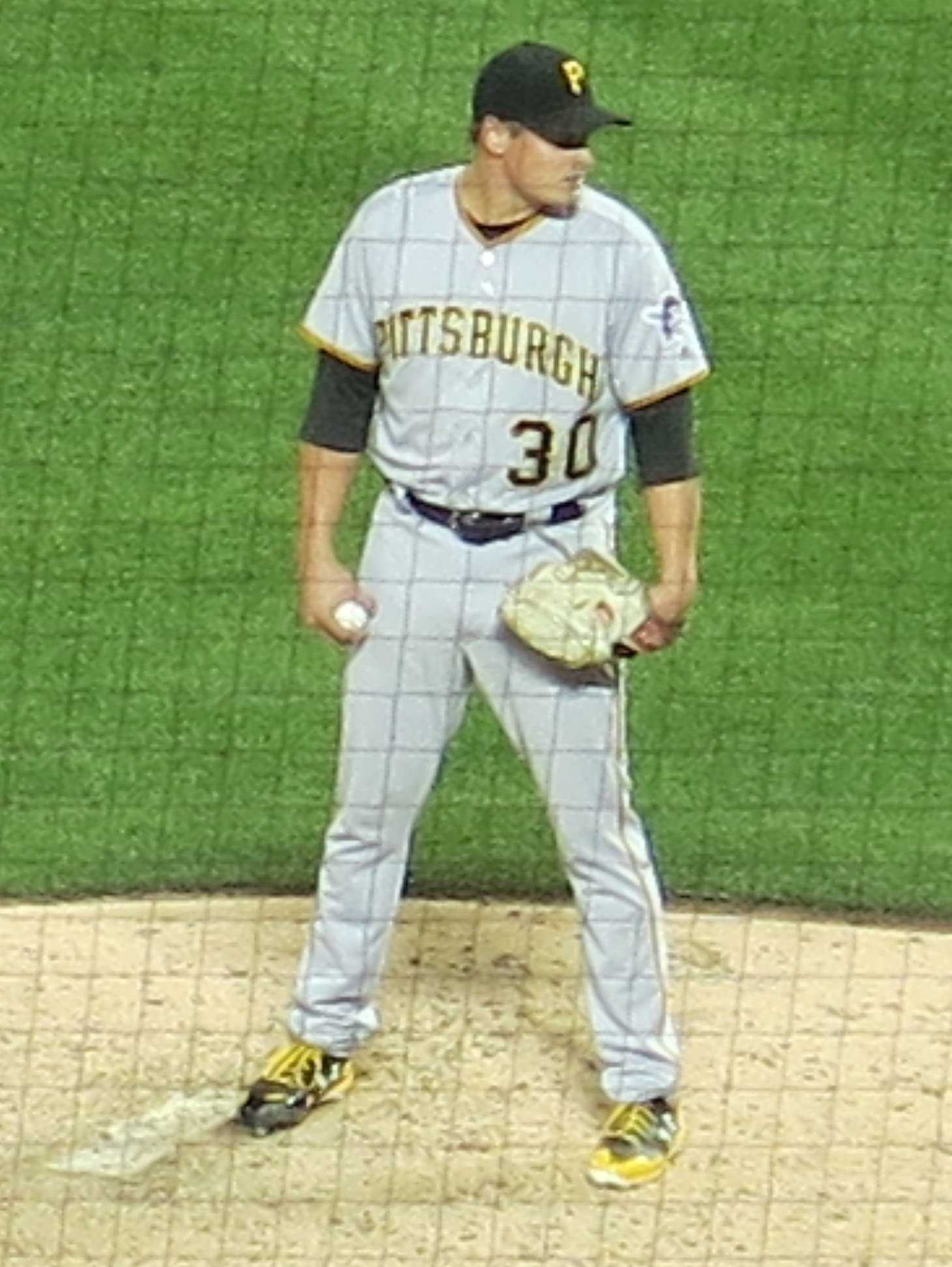
- Crick with the Pittsburgh Pirates in 2018
- Pitcher
- Born: November 30, 1992 (age 33); Fort Worth, Texas, U.S.
- Batted: Left Threw: Right

MLB debut
- June 22, 2017, for the San Francisco Giants

Last MLB appearance
- June 13, 2022, for the Chicago White Sox

MLB statistics
- Win–loss record: 9–11
- Earned run average: 3.56
- Strikeouts: 201
- Stats at Baseball Reference

Teams
- San Francisco Giants (2017); Pittsburgh Pirates (2018–2021); Chicago White Sox (2022)

Kyle Daniel Crick (born November 30, 1992) is an American former professional baseball pitcher. He played in Major League Baseball (MLB) for the San Francisco Giants, Pittsburgh Pirates, and Chicago White Sox.

== Career ==
=== High school career ===
Crick attended Sherman High School in Sherman, Texas. He played for the school's baseball team as a first baseman and third baseman, and only occasionally as a pitcher. He became a full-time pitcher in his senior year, and he had a 7–2 win–loss record and a 1.11 earned run average (ERA) with 95 strikeouts. Crick committed to attend Texas Christian University (TCU) to play college baseball for the TCU Horned Frogs.

=== San Francisco Giants ===
The San Francisco Giants selected Crick in the first round, with the 49th overall selection, of the 2011 Major League Baseball draft. Citing arm injuries suffered by TCU pitchers, Crick opted to sign with the Giants rather than attend college. He received a $900,000 signing bonus. After signing, he made his professional debut that year with the AZL Giants of the Rookie League Arizona Fall League, going 1–0 with a 6.43 ERA in seven relief innings pitched. Crick pitched to a 7–6 record and 2.51 ERA with 128 strikeouts in 111 1/3 innings pitched in 23 games (22 starts) for the Augusta GreenJackets of the Single–A South Atlantic League in 2012.

Prior to the 2013 season, Baseball America ranked Crick as the Giants' best prospect. He was also ranked as the 86th best prospect in baseball by MLB.com. He pitched for the San Jose Giants of the High–A California League in 2013, and was the Giants' lone representative in the All-Star Futures Game. Crick pitched to a 3–1 record and a 1.57 ERA with 95 strikeouts in 68 2/3 innings pitched in 14 starts for San Jose. He missed two months of the season with an oblique injury, and was assigned to the Scottsdale Scorpions of the Arizona Fall League to make up for missed innings. He earned comparisons to Giants pitcher Matt Cain.

Before the 2014 season, MLB.com ranked him as the 32nd best prospect in all of baseball, jumping 54 spots from his previous ranking of 89th overall in 2013. He was also ranked by Baseball America as the 33rd best prospect in baseball. Crick pitched for the Richmond Flying Squirrels of the Double–A Eastern League in 2014, compiling a 6–7 record and 3.79 ERA in 23 games (22 starts). Crick returned to Richmond in 2015, and struggled with his control, walking 66 batters in 63 innings pitched. He was removed from the starting rotation and used as a relief pitcher. In 36 games (11 starts) for Richmond, he was 3–4 with a 3.29 ERA and 1.79 WHIP. After the 2015 season, the Giants added Crick to their 40-man roster to protect him from being eligible for selection in the Rule 5 draft.

Crick returned to Richmond in 2016 as a starting pitcher. In 23 starts, he pitched to a 4–11 record and a 5.04 ERA. After a strong performance in spring training in 2017, he was assigned to the Sacramento River Cats of the Triple–A Pacific Coast League to begin the season. As a relief pitcher, he had a 1–2 record and a 2.76 ERA in 29 1/3 innings pitched across 24 appearances, with 39 strikeouts.

On June 20, the Giants promoted Crick to the major leagues as a middle reliever. He made his major league debut on June 22. Crick remained with the Giants for the remainder of the season and had a 3.06 ERA in 32 1/3 major league innings, striking out 28 and allowing 17 walks.

=== Pittsburgh Pirates ===
On January 15, 2018, the Giants traded Crick, Bryan Reynolds and $500,000 of international bonus slot money to the Pittsburgh Pirates in exchange for Andrew McCutchen and cash considerations. Crick began the 2018 season with the Indianapolis Indians of the Triple-A International League, and was promoted to the Pirates on April 13. Crick spent the entire season pitching out of the bullpen, leading the team in ERA with a 2.39 ERA in 64 games. He struck out 65 batters in 60 1/3 innings. Crick posted a 4.96 ERA in 52 appearances for the Pirates in 2019. On September 10, Crick and teammate Felipe Vázquez got into a clubhouse fight. Crick broke his finger, requiring season-ending surgery on the tendon.

Crick began the 2020 season on the injured list due to a right shoulder strain and was activated on August 29, 2020. On September 14, Crick was placed back on the injured list due to a lat strain and missed the rest of the season. In 2020 for the Pirates, Crick registered a 1.59 ERA with 7 strikeouts in 5.2 innings pitched. In 2021, Crick recorded a 4.44 ERA in 27 appearances with Pittsburgh. He was designated for assignment by the Pirates on July 19, 2021, following the acquisition of Dillon Peters. On July 24, Crick was released by the Pirates.

=== Chicago White Sox ===
On July 30, 2021, Crick signed a minor league deal with the Chicago White Sox. The White Sox assigned him to the Triple-A Charlotte Knights. He made eight appearances for Charlotte, and went 2–0 with an 0.87 ERA with 15 strikeouts. On September 1, 2021, the White Sox released Crick.

On January 14, 2022, Crick re-signed with the White Sox. On April 7, his contract was purchased and he was selected to the Opening Day roster. He made 14 appearances for the White Sox, posting a 2–0 record and 4.02 ERA with 19 strikeouts in 15.2 innings pitched. He was placed on the injured list with right elbow inflammation on June 15, and transferred to the 60–day injured list on August 21, where he spent the remainder of the season. On November 4, Crick was removed from the 40-man roster and sent outright to Triple–A. He elected free agency three days later.

=== Tampa Bay Rays ===
On February 11, 2023, Crick signed a minor league contract with the Tampa Bay Rays. On March 25, Crick exercised the opt-out clause in his contract and elected free agency.

=== New York Mets ===
On December 1, 2023, Crick signed a minor league contract with the New York Mets that included an invitation to spring training. He split the 2024 campaign between the Single-A St. Lucie Mets, High-A Brooklyn Cyclones, and Triple-A Syracuse Mets. In 10 appearances for the three affiliates, Crick compiled a 1.74 ERA with 16 strikeouts across 10 1/3 innings pitched. He elected free agency following the season on November 4.

== Personal life ==
Crick had a fraternal twin named Kevin. On December 30, 2019, Kevin died after suffering a cervical injury after a fall in Cancun, Mexico. On May 15, 2020, his father Reggie died at the age of 69.
