= Nick Burdi =

American baseball player (born 1993)

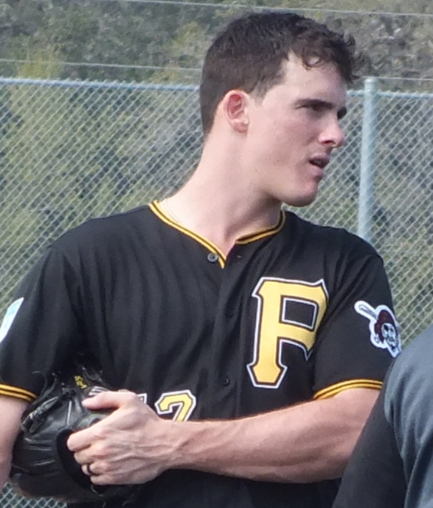
- Burdi with the Pittsburgh Pirates in 2019
- Pitcher
- Born: January 19, 1993 (age 33); Hinsdale, Illinois, U.S.
- Batted: Right Threw: Right

MLB debut
- September 11, 2018, for the Pittsburgh Pirates

Last MLB appearance
- May 16, 2025, for the Boston Red Sox

MLB statistics
- Win–loss record: 3–2
- Earned run average: 5.34
- Strikeouts: 44
- Stats at Baseball Reference

Teams
- Pittsburgh Pirates (2018–2020); Chicago Cubs (2023); New York Yankees (2024); Boston Red Sox (2025)

Nicholas Edward Burdi (/ˈbɜːrdiː/ BUR-dee; born January 19, 1993) is an American former professional baseball pitcher. He played in Major League Baseball (MLB) for the Pittsburgh Pirates, Chicago Cubs, New York Yankees, and Boston Red Sox from 2018 to 2025. Burdi played college baseball for the Louisville Cardinals of the University of Louisville.

== Amateur career ==
Burdi attended Downers Grove South High School in Downers Grove, Illinois, where he played for the school's baseball team as a pitcher and for the football team as a quarterback. Before his junior year, Burdi quit the football team to focus on baseball. Burdi, as a child and teen also played for the Downers Grove Longshots. He was able to throw his fastball as fast as 95 miles per hour (153 km/h) as a high school student.

Burdi participated in the Area Code Games in the summer of 2010, attracting the attention of scouts, including Keith Law of ESPN.com. After his senior season, Burdi expected to be chosen between the third to fifth rounds of the 2011 Major League Baseball (MLB) Draft. However, he lasted in the draft until the 24th round, when he was selected by the Minnesota Twins, with the 748th overall pick. He did not sign with the Twins and instead elected to attend college.

Burdi enrolled at the University of Louisville, to play college baseball for the Louisville Cardinals baseball team. After the 2012 season, he played collegiate summer baseball with the Chatham Anglers of the Cape Cod Baseball League. By his sophomore year, Burdi could reach 100 miles per hour (160 km/h) with his fastball. Pitching as the Cardinals' closer, Burdi has an 0.78 earned run average (ERA) and 61 strikeouts in 34 2/3 innings pitched through his sophomore year. After his sophomore year, he joined the United States national collegiate baseball team. As a junior, Burdi had a 0.49 ERA and 65 strikeouts in 37 innings.

== Professional career ==
=== Minnesota Twins ===
Burdi was considered a top prospect in the 2014 MLB draft. The Minnesota Twins selected Burdi in the second round with the 46th overall selection of the draft. He signed with the Twins on June 25, receiving a $1,218,800 signing bonus, and reported to the Cedar Rapids Kernels of the Single–A Midwest League. He posted a 4.15 ERA in 13 innings, and the Twins promoted him to the Fort Myers Miracle of the High–A Florida State League in August. Burdi opened the 2015 season with the Chattanooga Lookouts of the Double–A Southern League. He struggled with a 5.93 ERA, and was demoted to Fort Myers in late June. After spending six weeks with Fort Myers, the Twins promoted Burdi back to Chattanooga, where he finished the season with a 1.77 ERA in 20 1/3 innings. The Twins assigned him to the Scottsdale Scorpions of the Arizona Fall League after the regular season.

Burdi pitched only three innings in 2016 due to a bone bruise in his right elbow. Burdi began the 2017 season with Chattanooga. He required Tommy John surgery to repair a torn ulnar collateral ligament in his right elbow in May 2017.

=== Pittsburgh Pirates ===
On December 14, 2017, the Philadelphia Phillies selected Burdi in the Rule 5 draft, and traded him to the Pittsburgh Pirates for $500,000 of international signing bonus money. Burdi was activated from the injured list to make his return from surgery on September 1, 2018. On September 11, he made his MLB debut, tossing 0 1/3 of an inning against the St. Louis Cardinals. He would only make two appearances in his rookie campaign, surrendering 3 runs (4 earned) on 3 hits and 2 walks with 2 strikeouts in 1 1/3 innings of work.

Burdi made the Pirates' Opening Day roster in 2019. In 11 appearances, he posted a 9.35 ERA with 17 strikeouts in 8 2/3 innings pitched. On June 25, 2019, Burdi underwent thoracic outlet surgery to relieve symptoms of thoracic outlet syndrome, ruling him out for the rest of the season.

After the delay of the 2020 season due to the COVID-19 pandemic, Burdi made only three appearances before he was placed on the injured list with a right elbow injury. In August 2020, Burdi received a platelet-rich plasma injection to avoid surgery. However, in October, Burdi underwent his second career Tommy John surgery, and was ruled out for the 2021 season. On November 1, 2020, Burdi was designated for assignment by the Pirates. On November 9, he elected free agency in lieu of an outright assignment.

=== San Diego Padres ===
On December 22, 2020, Burdi signed a minor league contract with the San Diego Padres. He did not play in a game in 2021 as he recovered from Tommy John surgery. Burdi was assigned to the Triple-A El Paso Chihuahuas to begin the 2022 season, but was released on April 21, 2022, without making an appearance for the organization. He re-signed with San Diego on a minor league contract on May 4.

=== Chicago Cubs ===
On December 7, 2022, the Chicago Cubs selected Burdi from the Padres in the minor league phase of the Rule 5 draft. Burdi returned from surgery in 2023, making 11 appearances for the Triple-A Iowa Cubs and posting a 3.38 ERA with 19 strikeouts and five saves in 10 2/3 innings pitched.

On May 15, 2023, Burdi's contract was selected to the active roster. He made three appearances for Chicago before he was placed on the injured list on May 24 after undergoing an emergency appendectomy. On June 13, Burdi was transferred to the 60–day injured list. Following the season on November 2, he was removed from the 40–man roster and sent outright to Triple–A Iowa. Burdi elected free agency on November 6.

=== New York Yankees ===
On December 21, 2023, Burdi signed a minor league contract with the New York Yankees. On March 25, 2024, the Yankees announced that Burdi had earned one of the team's final Opening Day bullpen roles alongside Clayton Beeter. He posted a 1.86 ERA in 12 games to begin the season, but was placed on the injured list with right hip inflammation on May 24. After receiving a platelet-rich plasma injection, Burdi was transferred to the 60–day injured list on June 23. He was activated on August 1. Burdi was designated for assignment by the Yankees on September 7. He cleared waivers and was sent outright to the Triple–A Scranton/Wilkes-Barre RailRiders on September 9. Burdi elected free agency on October 1.

=== Boston Red Sox ===
On February 28, 2025, Burdi signed a minor league contract with the Boston Red Sox. In 13 appearances for the Triple-A Worcester Red Sox, he posted a 3-0 record and 0.54 ERA with 25 strikeouts and three saves across 16 2/3 innings pitched. On May 16, the Red Sox selected Burdi's contract, adding him to their active roster. He made four scoreless appearances for Boston before being placed on the injured list with a foot contusion on June 3. While rehabbing with Worcester, Burdi suffered a hip injury; he was transferred to the 60-day injured list on July 9 as a result. He was activated from the injured list on August 2, and was designated for assignment by the team on August 11. Burdi cleared waivers and was sent outright to Triple-A Worcester on August 13. He elected free agency on October 8.

=== New York Mets ===
On November 25, 2025, Burdi signed a minor league contract with the New York Mets. He made five appearances for the Triple-A Syracuse Mets, recording a 2.08 ERA with three strikeouts across 4 1/3 innings pitched. On May 5, 2026, Burdi retired from professional baseball.

== Personal life ==
Burdi's older brother, Drew, was an All-State quarterback who played football for Downers Grove South and Western Michigan. His younger brother, Zack, pitched in Major League Baseball from 2020 to 2023.

== See also ==
- Rule 5 draft results
