= 2019 San Diego Padres season =

2019 San Diego Padres
- League: National League
- Division: West
- Ballpark: Petco Park
- City: San Diego, California
- Record: 70–92 (.432)
- Divisional place: 5th
- Owners: Ron Fowler
- General managers: A. J. Preller
- Managers: Andy Green (through September 20); Rod Barajas (from September 21)
- Television: Fox Sports San Diego (Don Orsillo, Mark Grant, Mike Pomeranz, Mark Sweeney, Jesse Agler); Fox Deportes San Diego (Spanish)
- Radio: KWFN 97.3 FM (Ted Leitner, Jesse Agler); XEMO 860 AM (Spanish) (Eduardo Ortega, Carlos Hernandez, Pedro Gutierrez)

The 2019 San Diego Padres season was the 51st season of the San Diego Padres franchise. The Padres played their home games at Petco Park as members of Major League Baseball's National League West. On September 21, the Padres fired Andy Green as manager. Bench coach Rod Barajas was promoted to interim manager.

The Padres hit a franchise record seven home runs in their 19–4 win against the Toronto Blue Jays on May 25. Though they improved on their record from the previous season, they still failed to qualify for the postseason for the thirteenth straight year.

== Season standings ==
=== National League West ===
NL West
Team	W	L	Pct.	GB	Home	Road
Los Angeles Dodgers	106	56	.654	—	59‍–‍22	47‍–‍34
Arizona Diamondbacks	85	77	.525	21	44‍–‍37	41‍–‍40
San Francisco Giants	77	85	.475	29	35‍–‍46	42‍–‍39
Colorado Rockies	71	91	.438	35	43‍–‍38	28‍–‍53
San Diego Padres	70	92	.432	36	36‍–‍45	34‍–‍47

=== National League Wildcard ===
Division leaders
Team	W	L	Pct.
Los Angeles Dodgers	106	56	.654
Atlanta Braves	97	65	.599
St. Louis Cardinals	91	71	.562

Wild Card teams (Top 2 teams qualify for postseason)
Team	W	L	Pct.	GB
Washington Nationals	93	69	.574	+4
Milwaukee Brewers	89	73	.549	—
New York Mets	86	76	.531	3
Arizona Diamondbacks	85	77	.525	4
Chicago Cubs	84	78	.519	5
Philadelphia Phillies	81	81	.500	8
San Francisco Giants	77	85	.475	12
Cincinnati Reds	75	87	.463	14
Colorado Rockies	71	91	.438	18
San Diego Padres	70	92	.432	19
Pittsburgh Pirates	69	93	.426	20
Miami Marlins	57	105	.352	32

=== Record vs. opponents ===
2019 National League record Source: MLB Standings Grid – 2019
Team	AZ	ATL	CHC	CIN	COL	LAD	MIA	MIL	NYM	PHI	PIT	SD	SF	STL	WSH	AL
Arizona	—	4–3	2–4	3–3	9–10	8–11	3–4	2–5	2–5	4–2	6–1	11–8	10–9	3–3	4–3	14–6
Atlanta	3–4	—	5–2	3–4	3–3	2–4	15–4	3–3	11–8	9–10	5–2	5–2	5–2	4–2	11–8	13–7
Chicago	4–2	2–5	—	8–11	3–3	3–4	6–1	9–10	5–2	2–5	11–8	4–3	4–2	9–10	2–4	12–8
Cincinnati	3–3	4–3	11–8	—	3–3	1–5	6–1	8–11	3–4	3–4	7–12	5–2	4–3	7–12	1–5	9–11
Colorado	10–9	3–3	3–3	3–3	—	4–15	5–2	5–2	2–4	3–4	2–5	11–8	7–12	2–5	3–4	8–12
Los Angeles	11–8	4–2	4–3	5–1	15–4	—	5–1	4–3	5–2	5–2	6–0	13–6	12–7	3–4	4–3	10–10
Miami	4–3	4–15	1–6	1–6	2–5	1–5	—	2–5	6–13	10–9	3–3	4–2	3–3	3–4	4–15	9–11
Milwaukee	5–2	3–3	10–9	11–8	2–5	3–4	5–2	—	5–1	4–3	15–4	3–4	2–4	9–10	4–2	8–12
New York	5–2	8–11	2–5	4–3	4–2	2–5	13–6	1–5	—	7–12	5–1	3–3	3–4	2–5	12–7	15–5
Philadelphia	2–4	10–9	5–2	4–3	4–3	2–5	9–10	3–4	12–7	—	4–2	3–3	3–4	4–2	5–14	11–9
Pittsburgh	1–6	2–5	8–11	12–7	5–2	0–6	3–3	4–15	1–5	2–4	—	6–1	5–2	5–14	3–4	12–8
San Diego	8–11	2–5	3–4	2–5	8–11	6–13	2–4	4–3	3–3	3–3	1–6	—	9–10	4–2	4–3	11–9
San Francisco	9–10	2–5	2–4	3–4	12–7	7–12	3–3	4–2	4–3	4–3	2–5	10–9	—	3–4	1–5	11–9
St. Louis	3–3	2–4	10–9	12–7	5–2	4–3	4–3	10–9	5–2	2–4	14–5	2–4	4–3	—	5–2	9–11
Washington	3–4	8–11	4–2	5–1	4–3	3–4	15–4	2–4	7–12	14–5	4–3	3–4	5–1	2–5	—	14–6

== Game log ==
2019 game log: 70–92 (Home: 36–43; Away: 34–49)
March: 3–1 (Home: 3–1; Away: 0–0)

#	Date	Opponent	Score	Win	Loss	Save	Attendance	Record	Streak
1	March 28	Giants	2–0	**Lauer** (1–0)	Bumgarner (0–1)	**Yates** (1)	44,655	1–0	W1
2	March 29	Giants	4–1	**Lucchesi** (1–0)	Holland (0–1)	**Yates** (2)	33,769	2–0	W2
3	March 30	Giants	2–3	Rodríguez (1–0)	**Margevicius** (0–1)	Smith (1)	41,899	2–1	L1
4	March 31	Giants	3–1	**Warren** (1–0)	Vincent (0–1)	**Yates** (3)	38,444	3–1	W1

April: 14–12 (Home: 4–7; Away: 10–5)

#	Date	Opponent	Score	Win	Loss	Save	Attendance	Record	Streak
5	April 1	Diamondbacks	3–10	Kelly (1–0)	**Strahm** (0–1)	Duplantier (1)	18,683	3–2	L1
6	April 2	Diamondbacks	5–8	Greinke (1–1)	**Lauer** (1–1)	Holland (2)	22,504	3–3	L2
7	April 3	Diamondbacks	4–1	**Lucchesi** (2–0)	Ray (0–1)	—	19,376	4–3	W1
–	April 4	@ Cardinals	Postponed (rain): Makeup date April 5						
8	April 5	@ Cardinals	5–3	**Stock** (1–0)	Reyes (0–1)	**Yates** (4)	46,615	5–3	W2
9	April 6	@ Cardinals	6–4	**Wisler** (1–0)	Miller (0–1)	**Yates** (5)	44,492	6–3	W3
10	April 7	@ Cardinals	1–4	Wainwright (1–0)	**Strahm** (0–2)	Hicks (1)	44,340	6–4	L1
11	April 8	@ Giants	6–5	**Lauer** (2–1)	Moronta (0–2)	**Yates** (6)	28,625	7–4	W1
12	April 9	@ Giants	2–7	Holland (1–1)	**Lucchesi** (2–1)	—	28,506	7–5	L1
13	April 10	@ Giants	3–1	**Margevicius** (1–1)	Rodríguez (1–2)	**Yates** (7)	28,584	8–5	W1
14	April 11	@ Diamondbacks	7–6	**Stammen** (1–0)	Bradley (0–1)	**Wingenter** (1)	15,449	9–5	W2
15	April 12	@ Diamondbacks	2–1	**Reyes** (1–0)	Weaver (0–1)	**Yates** (8)	22,209	10–5	W3
16	April 13	@ Diamondbacks	5–4	**Stammen** (2–0)	Andriese (2–1)	**Yates** (9)	27,256	11–5	W4
17	April 14	@ Diamondbacks	4–8	Greinke (2–1)	**Lauer** (2–2)	—	25,489	11–6	L1
18	April 15	Rockies	2–5	Senzatela (1–0)	**Lucchesi** (2–2)	Davis (1)	24,867	11–7	L2
19	April 16	Rockies	2–8	Gray (1–3)	**Margevicius** (1–2)	—	24,963	11–8	L3
20	April 18	Reds	1–4	Roark (1–0)	**Paddack** (0–1)	Iglesias (3)	26,577	11–9	L4
21	April 19	Reds	2–3 (11)	Hughes (2–0)	**Stammen** (2–1)	Lorenzen (1)	33,442	11–10	L5
22	April 20	Reds	2–4	Castillo (2–1)	**Lauer** (2–3)	Iglesias (4)	37,137	11–11	L6
23	April 21	Reds	4–3	**Lucchesi** (3–2)	Mahle (0–2)	**Yates** (10)	25,932	12–11	W1
24	April 23	Mariners	6–3	**Margevicius** (2–2)	Swanson (0–2)	**Yates** (11)	25,154	13–11	W2
25	April 24	Mariners	1–0	**Paddack** (1–1)	Hernández (1–2)	**Yates** (12)	23,417	14–11	W3
26	April 26	@ Nationals	4–3	**Stammen** (3–1)	Doolittle (3–1)	**Yates** (13)	27,193	15–11	W4
27	April 27	@ Nationals	8–3 (10)	**Perdomo** (1–0)	Suero (1–3)	—	35,422	16–11	W5
28	April 28	@ Nationals	6–7 (11)	Miller (1–0)	**Wisler** (1–1)	—	30,186	16–12	L1
29	April 29	@ Braves	1–3	Soroka (2–1)	**Margevicius** (2–3)	Webb (1)	19,353	16–13	L2
30	April 30	@ Braves	4–3	**Paddack** (2–1)	Teherán (2–4)	**Yates** (14)	18,626	17–13	W1

May: 13–14 (Home: 8–6; Away: 5–8)

#	Date	Opponent	Score	Win	Loss	Save	Attendance	Record	Streak
31	May 1	@ Braves	1–5	Fried (4–1)	**Quantrill** (0–1)	—	20,394	17–14	L1
32	May 2	@ Braves	11–2	**Strahm** (1–2)	Foltynewicz (0–1)	—	23,746	18–14	W1
33	May 3	Dodgers	3–4	Alexander (2–1)	**Yates** (0–1)	Jansen (11)	44,425	18–15	L1
34	May 4	Dodgers	6–7	Stripling (2–2)	**Yates** (0–2)	Jansen (12)	44,558	18–16	L2
35	May 5	Dodgers	8–5	**Warren** (2–0)	Jansen (2–1)	—	44,473	19–16	W1
36	May 6	Mets	4–0	**Paddack** (3–1)	deGrom (2–4)	**Stammen** (1)	20,176	20–16	W2
37	May 7	Mets	6–7	Lugo (2–0)	**Warren** (2–1)	Díaz (9)	23,129	20–17	L1
38	May 8	Mets	3–2	**Reyes** (2–0)	Bashlor (0–1)	**Yates** (15)	21,952	21–17	W1
39	May 10	@ Rockies	2–12	Márquez (4–2)	**Lauer** (2–4)	—	27,594	21–18	L1
40	May 11	@ Rockies	4–3	**Stammen** (4–1)	Davis (1–1)	**Yates** (16)	37,118	22–18	W1
41	May 12	@ Rockies	7–10	Senzatela (3–2)	**Margevicius** (2–4)	—	40,234	22–19	L1
42	May 14	@ Dodgers	3–6	Kershaw (3–0)	**Paddack** (3–2)	Jansen (13)	46,460	22–20	L2
43	May 15	@ Dodgers	0–2	Maeda (5–2)	**Strahm** (1–3)	Jansen (14)	41,671	22–21	L3
44	May 16	Pirates	4–3	**Warren** (3–1)	Rodríguez (0–3)	**Yates** (17)	20,877	23–21	W1
45	May 17	Pirates	3–5	Lyles (4–1)	**Lucchesi** (3–3)	—	28,913	23–22	L1
46	May 18	Pirates	2–7	Brault (1–1)	**Margevicius** (2–5)	—	39,856	23–23	L2
47	May 19	Pirates	4–6	Musgrove (3–4)	**Quantrill** (0–2)	Vázquez (13)	29,863	23–24	L3
48	May 20	Diamondbacks	2–1	**Paddack** (4–2)	Weaver (3–3)	**Yates** (18)	17,578	24–24	W1
49	May 21	Diamondbacks	3–2	**Strahm** (2-3)	Greinke (6-2)	**Yates** (19)	19,969	25–24	W2
50	May 22	Diamondbacks	5–2	**Lauer** (3-4)	Kelly (4-5)	**Yates** (20)	18,715	26–24	W3
51	May 24	@ Blue Jays	6–3	**Wisler** (2-1)	Hudson (3-2)	**Stammen** (2)	19,480	27–24	W4
52	May 25	@ Blue Jays	19–4	**Quantrill** (1-2)	Jackson (0-2)	—	24,212	28–24	W5
53	May 26	@ Blue Jays	1–10	Stroman (3–6)	**Erlin** (0–1)	—	24,462	28–25	L1
54	May 27	@ Yankees	2–5	Hale (1–0)	**Strahm** (2–4)	Chapman (15)	46,254	28–26	L2
55	May 28	@ Yankees	5–4	**Lauer** (4–4)	Tanaka (3–4)	**Yates** (21)	37,028	29–26	W1
56	May 29	@ Yankees	0–7	Holder (4–2)	**Paddack** (4–3)	—	40,918	29–27	L1
57	May 31	Marlins	5–2	**Lucchesi** (4–3)	Smith (3–3)	**Yates** (22)	25,019	30–27	W1

June: 12–14 (Home: 8–7; Away: 4–7)

#	Date	Opponent	Score	Win	Loss	Save	Attendance	Record	Streak
58	June 1	Marlins	3–9	Ureña (4–6)	**Margevicius** (2–6)	—	26,858	30–28	L1
59	June 2	Marlins	3–9	Richards (3–5)	**Strahm** (2–5)	—	31,650	30–29	L2
60	June 3	Phillies	8–2	**Lauer** (5–4)	Nola (6–1)	—	21,654	31–29	W1
61	June 4	Phillies	6–9	Eickhoff (3–3)	**Paddack** (4–4)	Neris (11)	25,821	31–30	L1
62	June 5	Phillies	5–7	Nicasio (1–2)	**Stammen** (4–2)	Neris (12)	23,004	31–31	L2
63	June 6	Nationals	5–4	**Lucchesi** (5–3)	Corbin (5–4)	**Yates** (23)	19,908	32–31	W1
64	June 7	Nationals	5–4	**Warren** (4–1)	Doolittle (4–2)	—	21,645	33–31	W2
65	June 8	Nationals	1–4	Scherzer (4–5)	**Lauer** (5–5)	Doolittle (14)	30,219	33–32	L1
66	June 9	Nationals	2–5	Strasburg (7–3)	**Stammen** (4–3)	—	30,518	33–33	L2
67	June 11	@ Giants	5–6	Melancon (3–1)	**Wingenter** (0–1)	Smith (15)	28,535	33–34	L3
68	June 12	@ Giants	2–4	Anderson (2–1)	**Lucchesi** (5–4)	Smith (16)	31,188	33–35	L4
69	June 13	@ Rockies	6–9	Gray (6–5)	**Strahm** (2–6)	—	35,504	33– 36	L5
70	June 14	@ Rockies	16–12 (12)	**Stammen** (5–3)	Díaz (1–1)	—	38,077	34–36	W1
71	June 15	@ Rockies	8–14	Márquez (7–3)	**Lauer** (5–6)	—	46,133	34–37	L1
72	June 16	@ Rockies	14–13	**Reyes** (3–0)	Davis (1–2)	**Yates** (24)	47,526	35–37	W1
73	June 17	Brewers	2–0	**Lucchesi** (6–4)	Chacín (3–8)	**Yates** (25)	24,914	36–37	W2
74	June 18	Brewers	4–1	**Allen** (1–0)	Woodruff (8–2)	**Yates** (26)	29,112	37–37	W3
75	June 19	Brewers	8–7	**Reyes** (4–0)	Jeffress (1–1)	**Stammen** (3)	28,144	38–37	W4
76	June 21	@ Pirates	1–2	Musgrove (5–7)	**Lauer** (5–7)	Vázquez (18)	33,437	38–38	L1
77	June 22	@ Pirates	3–6	Crick (3–3)	**Stammen** (5–4)	Vázquez (19)	26,919	38–39	L2
78	June 23	@ Pirates	10–11 (11)	Liriano (2–1)	**Wisler** (2–2)	—	25,294	38–40	L3
79	June 25	@ Orioles	8–3	**Allen** (2–0)	Yacabonis (1–2)	—	21,644	39–40	W1
80	June 26	@ Orioles	10–5	**Strahm** (3–6)	Bundy (3–10)	**Stammen** (4)	13,408	40–40	W2
81	June 28	Cardinals	3–1	**Quantrill** (2–2)	Wacha (5–4)	**Yates** (27)	33,329	41–40	W3
82	June 29	Cardinals	12–2	**Paddack** (5–4)	Hudson (6–4)	—	44,407	42–40	W4
83	June 30	Cardinals	3–5 (11)	Martínez (2–0)	**Wieck** (0–1)	Leone (1)		42–41	L1

July: 8–16 (Home: 2–9; Away: 6–7)

#	Date	Opponent	Score	Win	Loss	Save	Attendance	Record	Streak
84	July 1	Giants	2–13	Samardzija (5–7)	**Allen** (2–1)	—	25,274	42–42	L2
85	July 2	Giants	4–10	Beede (2–3)	**Strahm** (3–7)	—	24,007	42–43	L3
86	July 3	Giants	5–7	Gott (5–0)	**Perdomo** (1–1)	Smith (22)	33,905	42–44	L4
87	July 4	@ Dodgers	1–5	Ryu (10–2)	**Lamet** (0–1)	—	53,801	42–45	L5
88	July 5	@ Dodgers	3–2	**Stammen** (6–4)	García (1–3)	**Yates** (28)	49,790	43–45	W1
89	July 6	@ Dodgers	3–1	**Wingenter** (1–1)	Maeda (7–5)	**Yates** (29)	53,610	44–45	W2
90	July 7	@ Dodgers	5–3	**Lucchesi** (7–4)	Stripling (3–3)	**Yates** (30)	44,171	45–45	W3
**90th All-Star Game in Cleveland, OH**
Representing the Padres: Kirby Yates
91	July 12	Braves	3–5	Keuchel (3–2)	**Lamet** (0–2)	Jackson (15)	34,692	45–46	L1
92	July 13	Braves	5–7 (10)	Newcomb (3–1)	**Perdomo** (1–2)	Jackson (16)	43,148	45–47	L2
93	July 14	Braves	1–4	Soroka (10–1)	**Wingenter** (1–2)	Minter (5)	34,739	45–48	L3
94	July 16	@ Marlins	7–12	Yamamoto (4–0)	**Allen** (2–2)	—	8,151	45–49	L4
95	July 17	@ Marlins	3–2	**Paddack** (6–4)	Richards (3–11)	**Yates** (31)	7,818	46–49	W1
96	July 18	@ Marlins	3–4	Romo (2–0)	**Wingenter** (1–3)	—	21,149	46–50	L1
97	July 19	@ Cubs	5–6	Strop (2–3)	**Stammen** (6–5)	Kimbrel (5)	39,526	46–51	L2
98	July 20	@ Cubs	5–6	Quintana (8–7)	**Lucchesi** (7–5)	Kimbrel (6)	40,314	46–52	L3
99	July 21	@ Cubs	5–1	**Quantrill** (3–2)	Hendricks (7–8)	—	39,954	47–52	W1
100	July 23	@ Mets	2–5	Vargas (5–5)	**Paddack** (6–5)	Díaz (22)	33,199	47–53	L1
101	July 24	@ Mets	7–2	**Strahm** (4–7)	Syndergaard (7–5)	—	32,252	48–53	W1
102	July 25	@ Mets	0–4	deGrom (6–7)	**Lauer** (5–8)	—	37,822	48–54	L1
103	July 26	Giants	1–2 (11)	Melancon (4–2)	**Allen** (2–3)	Smith (25)	41,951	48–55	L2
104	July 27	Giants	5–1	**Quantrill** (4–2)	Anderson (3–3)	—	41,371	49–55	W1
105	July 28	Giants	6–7	Bumgarner (6–7)	**Perdomo** (1–3)	Smith (26)	35,087	49–56	L1
106	July 29	Orioles	8–1	**Paddack** (7–5)	Hess (1–10)	—	34,290	50–56	W1
107	July 30	Orioles	5–8	Castro (1–1)	**Strahm** (4–8)	Armstrong (3)	30,286	50–57	L1

August: 13–15 (Home: 6–7; Away: 7–8)

#	Date	Opponent	Score	Win	Loss	Save	Attendance	Record	Streak
108	August 1	@ Dodgers	2–8	Kershaw (10–2)	**Lucchesi** (7–6)	—	53,181	50–58	L2
109	August 2	@ Dodgers	5–2	**Lauer** (6–8)	May (0–1)	**Yates** (32)	50,780	51–58	W1
110	August 3	@ Dodgers	1–4	Buehler (10–2)	**Quantrill** (4–3)	—	54,010	51–59	L1
111	August 4	@ Dodgers	10–11	Báez (6–2)	**Yates** (0–3)	—	44,110	51–60	L2
112	August 6	@ Mariners	9–4	**Lamet** (1–2)	LeBlanc (6–5)	—	24,020	52–60	W1
113	August 7	@ Mariners	2–3	Magill (3–0)	**Muñoz** (0–1)	Bass (2)	20,142	52–61	L1
114	August 8	Rockies	9–3	**Strahm** (5–8)	Gray (10–8)	—	27,806	53–61	W1
115	August 9	Rockies	7–1	**Quantrill** (5–3)	Freeland (3–10)	—	27,882	54–61	W2
116	August 10	Rockies	8–5	**Muñoz** (1–1)	Díaz (4–3)	**Yates** (33)	42,564	55–61	W3
117	August 11	Rockies	3–8	Márquez (11–5)	**Stammen** (6–6)	—	28,930	55–62	L1
118	August 12	Rays	4–10	Pruitt (2–0)	**Lucchesi** (7–7)	—	21,301	55–63	L2
119	August 13	Rays	5–7	Anderson (4–4)	**Báez** (0–1)	Pagán (13)	25,261	55–64	L3
120	August 14	Rays	7–2	**Quantrill** (6–6)	Beeks (5–2)	—	22,886	56–64	W1
121	August 16	@ Phillies	4–8	Velasquez (5–7)	**Paddack** (7–6)	—	26,084	56–65	L1
122	August 17	@ Phillies	5–3	**Lamet** (2–2)	Pivetta (4–5)	**Yates** (34)	31,332	57–65	W1
123	August 18	@ Phillies	3–2	**Lucchesi** (8–7)	Hughes (2–5)	**Yates** (35)	36,210	58–65	W2
124	August 19	@ Reds	3–2	**Perdomo** (2–3)	Bauer (10–10)	**Yates** (36)	10,176	59–65	W3
125	August 20	@ Reds	2–3	Gray (9–6)	**Quantrill** (6–4)	Iglesias (25)	12,468	59–66	L1
126	August 21	@ Reds	2–4	Castillo (12–5)	**Yardley** (0–1)	Iglesias (26)	13,397	59–67	L2
127	August 23	Red Sox	0–11	Rodríguez (15–5)	**Paddack** (7–7)	—	42,904	59–68	L3
128	August 24	Red Sox	4–5	Barnes (4–4)	**Yates** (0–4)	Workman (8)	42,625	59–69	L4
129	August 25	Red Sox	3–1	**Lucchesi** (9–7)	Johnson (1–3)	**Yates** (37)	38,026	60–69	W1
130	August 26	Dodgers	4–3	**Lauer** (7–8)	May (1–3)	**Yates** (38)	26,172	61–69	W2
131	August 27	Dodgers	0–9	Buehler (11–3)	**Quantrill** (6–5)	—	27,952	61–70	L1
132	August 28	Dodgers	4–6 (10)	Jansen (4–3)	**Yates** (0–5)	Sadler (1)	26,871	61–71	L2
133	August 29	@ Giants	5–3	**Paddack** (8–7)	Rodríguez (5–7)	**Muñoz** (1)	33,135	62–71	W1
134	August 30	@ Giants	3–8	Bumgarner (9–8)	**Lamet** (2–3)	—	34,293	62–72	L1
135	August 31	@ Giants	4–1	**Stammen** (7–6)	Watson (2–2)	**Yates** (39)	36,424	63–72	W1

September: 7–20 (Home: 5–6; Away: 2–14)

#	Date	Opponent	Score	Win	Loss	Save	Attendance	Record	Streak
136	September 1	@ Giants	8–4	**Lauer** (8–8)	Samardzija (9–11)	—	38,701	64–72	W2
137	September 2	@ Diamondbacks	7–14	Leake (11–10)	**Quantrill** (6–6)	—	23,477	64–73	L1
138	September 3	@ Diamondbacks	1–2	Kelly (10–13)	**Bolaños** (0–1)	Bradley (11)	15,402	64–74	L2
139	September 4	@ Diamondbacks	1–4	Gallen (3–4)	**Stammen** (7–7)	Bradley (12)	18,096	64–75	L3
140	September 6	Rockies	2–3	Melville (2–1)	**Lamet** (2–4)	Díaz (1)	26,073	64–76	L4
141	September 7	Rockies	3–0	**Lucchesi** (10–7)	Hoffman (1–6)	**Yates** (40)	29,709	65–76	W1
142	September 8	Rockies	2–1 (10)	**Stammen** (8–7)	Tinoco (0–2)	—	26,834	66–76	W2
143	September 9	Cubs	2–10	Hendricks (10–9)	**Quantrill** (6–7)	—	22,420	66–77	L1
144	September 10	Cubs	9–8 (10)	**Báez** (1–1)	Cishek (3–6)	—	25,497	67–77	W1
145	September 11	Cubs	4–0	**Paddack** (9–7)	Hamels (7–7)	—	24,203	68–77	W2
146	September 12	Cubs	1–4	Darvish (6–6)	**Lamet** (2–5)	—	22,501	68–78	L1
147	September 13	@ Rockies	8–10	Hoffman (2–6)	**Lucchesi** (10–8)	Díaz (4)	31,654	68–79	L2
148	September 14	@ Rockies	10–11	Lambert (3–6)	**Lauer** (8–9)	Tinoco (1)	47,370	68–80	L3
149	September 15	@ Rockies	5–10	Howard (1–0)	**Quantrill** (6–8)	—	30,699	68–81	L4
150	September 16	@ Brewers	1–5	Davies (10–7)	**Richards** (0–1)	—	33,215	68–82	L5
151	September 17	@ Brewers	1–3	Albers (8–5)	**Strahm** (5–9)	Pomeranz (2)	34,565	68–83	L6
152	September 18	@ Brewers	2–1	**Lamet** (3–5)	Houser (6–7)	**Yates** (41)	38,235	69–83	W1
153	September 19	@ Brewers	1–5	Peralta (7–3)	**Lucchesi** (10–9)	Hader (34)	31,687	69–84	L1
154	September 20	Diamondbacks	0–9	Kelly (12–14)	**Lauer** (8–10)	—	27,023	69–85	L2
155	September 21	Diamondbacks	2–4	Clarke (5–5)	**Strahm** (5–10)	Bradley (16)	30,191	69–86	L3
156	September 22	Diamondbacks	6–4 (10)	**Strahm** (6–10)	López (2–7)	—	31,293	70–86	W1
157	September 24	Dodgers	3–6	Gonsolin (4–2)	**Bolaños** (0–2)	Jansen (31)	29,708	70–87	L1
158	September 25	Dodgers	4–6	Floro (5–3)	**Bednar** (0–1)	Jansen (32)	30,552	70–88	L2
159	September 26	Dodgers	0–1	Kershaw (16–5)	**Lucchesi** (10–10)	Maeda (3)	26,285	70–89	L3
160	September 27	@ Diamondbacks	3–6	Scott (1–0)	**Perdomo** (2–4)	Bradley (18)	32,244	70–90	L4
161	September 28	@ Diamondbacks	5–6	Sherfy (1–0)	**Bednar** (0–2)	Ginkel (2)	46,477	70–91	L5
162	September 29	@ Diamondbacks	0–1	Crichton (1–0)	**Strahm** (6–11)	—	45,446	70–92	L6

Legend: = Win = Loss = Postponement
Bold = Padres team member

== Roster ==
2019 San Diego Padres
Roster
Pitchers: 54 Logan Allen; 44 Pedro Ávila; 49 Michel Báez; 67 David Bednar; 57 Ronald Bolaños; 65 José Castillo; 47 Miguel Díaz; 12 Carl Edwards Jr.; 41 Robbie Erlin; 8 Javy Guerra; 29 Dinelson Lamet; 46 Eric Lauer; 38 Aaron Loup; 37 Joey Lucchesi; 25 Nick Margevicius; 88 Phil Maton; 50 Adrián Morejón; 52 Andrés Muñoz; 59 Chris Paddack; 61 Luis Perdomo; 40 Cal Quantrill; 64 Gerardo Reyes; 43 Garrett Richards; 34 Craig Stammen; 66 Robert Stock; 55 Matt Strahm; 17 Adam Warren; 57 Brad Wieck; 58 Trey Wingenter; 49 Matt Wisler; 54 Eric Yardley; 39 Kirby Yates	Catchers: 62 Austin Allen; 18 Austin Hedges; 27 Francisco Mejía; 21 Luis Torrens; Infielders: 11 Ty France; 5 Greg Garcia; 30 Eric Hosmer; 3 Ian Kinsler; 13 Manny Machado; 24 Seth Mejias-Brean; 23 Fernando Tatís Jr.; 9 Luis Urías	Outfielders: 33 Franchy Cordero; 24 Alex Dickerson; 16 Travis Jankowski; 7 Manuel Margot; 2 Nick Martini; 4 Wil Myers; 22 Josh Naylor; 2 José Pirela; 10 Hunter Renfroe; 32 Franmil Reyes	Manager: 20 Rod Barajas; 14 Andy Green; Coaches: 36 Darren Balsley (pitching); 20 Rod Barajas (bench); 81 Griffin Benedict (bullpen catcher); 45 Doug Bochtler (bullpen); 15 Damion Easley (assistant hitting/infielders); 26 Glenn Hoffman (third base); 56 Skip Schumaker (first base); 83 Peter Summerville (bullpen catcher); 28 Johnny Washington (hitting); 82 Keith Werman (development coordinator)

== Player stats ==
=== Batting ===
Note: G = Games played; AB = At bats; R = Runs; H = Hits; 2B = Doubles; 3B = Triples; HR = Home runs; RBI = Runs batted in; SB = Stolen bases; BB = Walks; AVG = Batting average; SLG = Slugging average

Player	G	AB	R	H	2B	3B	HR	RBI	SB	BB	AVG	SLG
Eric Hosmer	160	619	72	164	29	2	22	99	0	40	.265	.425
Manny Machado	156	587	81	150	21	2	32	85	5	65	.256	.462
Hunter Renfroe	140	440	64	95	19	1	33	64	5	46	.216	.489
Wil Myers	155	435	58	104	22	1	18	53	16	51	.239	.418
Manuel Margot	151	398	59	93	19	3	12	37	20	38	.234	.387
Fernando Tatís Jr.	84	334	61	106	13	6	22	53	16	30	.317	.590
Franmil Reyes	99	321	43	82	9	0	27	46	0	29	.255	.536
Austin Hedges	102	312	28	55	9	0	11	36	1	27	.176	.311
Greg Garcia	134	311	52	77	13	4	4	31	0	53	.248	.354
Ian Kinsler	87	258	28	56	12	0	9	22	2	19	.217	.368
Josh Naylor	94	253	29	63	15	0	8	32	1	25	.249	.403
Francisco Mejía	79	226	27	60	11	2	8	22	1	13	.265	.438
Luis Urías	71	215	27	48	8	1	4	24	0	25	.223	.326
Ty France	69	184	20	43	8	1	7	24	0	9	.234	.402
Nick Martini	26	82	7	20	4	1	0	5	0	12	.244	.317
Austin Allen	34	65	4	14	4	0	0	3	0	6	.215	.277
Seth Mejias-Brean	14	30	3	7	2	0	2	5	0	3	.233	.500
Travis Jankowski	25	22	4	4	0	0	0	0	2	2	.182	.182
Alex Dickerson	12	19	1	3	0	0	0	2	0	0	.158	.158
Franchy Cordero	9	15	2	5	1	0	0	1	1	4	.333	.400
Luis Torrens	7	14	2	3	1	0	0	0	0	2	.214	.286
José Pirela	2	5	0	0	0	0	0	0	0	0	.000	.000
Pitcher totals	162	246	10	29	4	0	0	8	0	5	.118	.134
Team totals	162	5391	682	1281	224	24	219	652	70	504	.238	.410

=== Pitching ===
Note: W = Wins; L = Losses; ERA = Earned run average; G = Games pitched; GS = Games started; SV = Saves; IP = Innings pitched; H = Hits allowed; R = Runs allowed; ER = Earned runs allowed; BB = Walks allowed; SO = Strikeouts

Player	W	L	ERA	G	GS	SV	IP	H	R	ER	BB	SO
Joey Lucchesi	10	10	4.18	30	30	0	163.2	144	78	76	56	158
Eric Lauer	8	10	4.45	30	29	0	149.2	158	82	74	51	138
Chris Paddack	9	7	3.33	26	26	0	140.2	107	58	52	31	153
Matt Strahm	6	11	4.71	46	16	0	114.2	121	61	60	22	118
Cal Quantrill	6	8	5.16	23	18	0	103.0	106	61	59	28	89
Craig Stammen	8	7	3.29	76	0	4	82.0	80	36	30	15	73
Dinelson Lamet	3	5	4.07	14	14	0	73.0	62	38	33	30	105
Luis Perdomo	2	4	4.00	47	1	0	72.0	69	34	32	18	55
Kirby Yates	0	5	1.19	60	0	41	60.2	41	14	8	13	101
Nick Margevicius	2	6	6.79	17	12	0	57.0	73	46	43	19	42
Robbie Erlin	0	1	5.37	37	1	0	55.1	72	36	33	15	52
Trey Wingenter	1	3	5.65	51	1	1	51.0	34	32	32	28	72
Michel Báez	1	1	3.03	24	1	0	29.2	25	10	10	14	28
Matt Wisler	2	2	5.28	21	0	0	29.0	34	17	17	10	34
Adam Warren	4	1	5.34	25	0	0	28.2	28	18	17	12	25
Gerardo Reyes	4	0	7.62	27	0	0	26.0	24	22	22	11	38
Logan Allen	2	3	6.75	8	4	0	25.1	33	20	19	13	14
Brad Wieck	0	1	6.57	30	0	0	24.2	26	19	18	9	31
Phil Maton	0	0	7.77	21	0	0	24.1	34	22	21	6	20
Andrés Muñoz	1	1	3.91	22	0	1	23.0	16	10	10	11	30
Ronald Bolaños	0	2	5.95	5	3	0	19.2	17	13	13	12	19
Eric Yardley	0	1	2.31	10	0	0	11.2	12	5	3	3	7
David Bednar	0	2	6.55	13	0	0	11.0	10	8	8	5	14
Robert Stock	1	0	10.13	10	0	0	10.2	14	14	12	8	15
Javy Guerra	0	0	5.19	8	0	0	8.2	7	5	5	3	6
Garrett Richards	0	1	8.31	3	3	0	8.2	10	8	8	6	11
Adrián Morejón	0	0	10.13	5	2	0	8.0	15	9	9	3	9
Miguel Díaz	0	0	7.11	5	0	0	6.1	9	5	5	1	4
Pedro Ávila	0	0	1.69	1	1	0	5.1	4	1	1	2	5
Aaron Loup	0	0	0.00	4	0	0	3.1	2	0	0	1	5
Ty France	0	0	4.50	2	0	0	2.0	2	1	1	0	0
Carl Edwards Jr.	0	0	32.40	2	0	0	1.2	4	6	6	4	2
Ian Kinsler	0	0	0.00	1	0	0	1.0	1	0	0	2	0
José Castillo	0	0	0.00	1	0	0	0.2	0	0	0	1	2
Team totals	70	92	4.60	162	162	47	1432.0	1394	789	732	463	1475

== Farm system ==
Level	Team	League	Manager	W	L	Position
AAA	El Paso Chihuahuas	Pacific Coast League	Edwin Rodríguez	80	60	2nd
AA	Amarillo Sod Poodles	Texas League	Phillip Wellman	72	66	2nd
High A	Lake Elsinore Storm	California League	Tony Tarasco	73	65	2nd
A	Fort Wayne TinCaps	Midwest League	Anthony Contreras	62	76	6th
A-Short Season	Tri-City Dust Devils	Northwest League	Mike McCoy	38	38	4th
Rookie	AZL Padres 1	Arizona League	Vinny Lopez	32	23	4th
Rookie	AZL Padres 2	Arizona League	Aaron Levin	39	17	1st
Rookie	DSL Padres	Dominican Summer League	Miguel Del Castillo	30	41	5th
