= Daniel Castro (baseball) =

Mexican baseball player (born 1992)

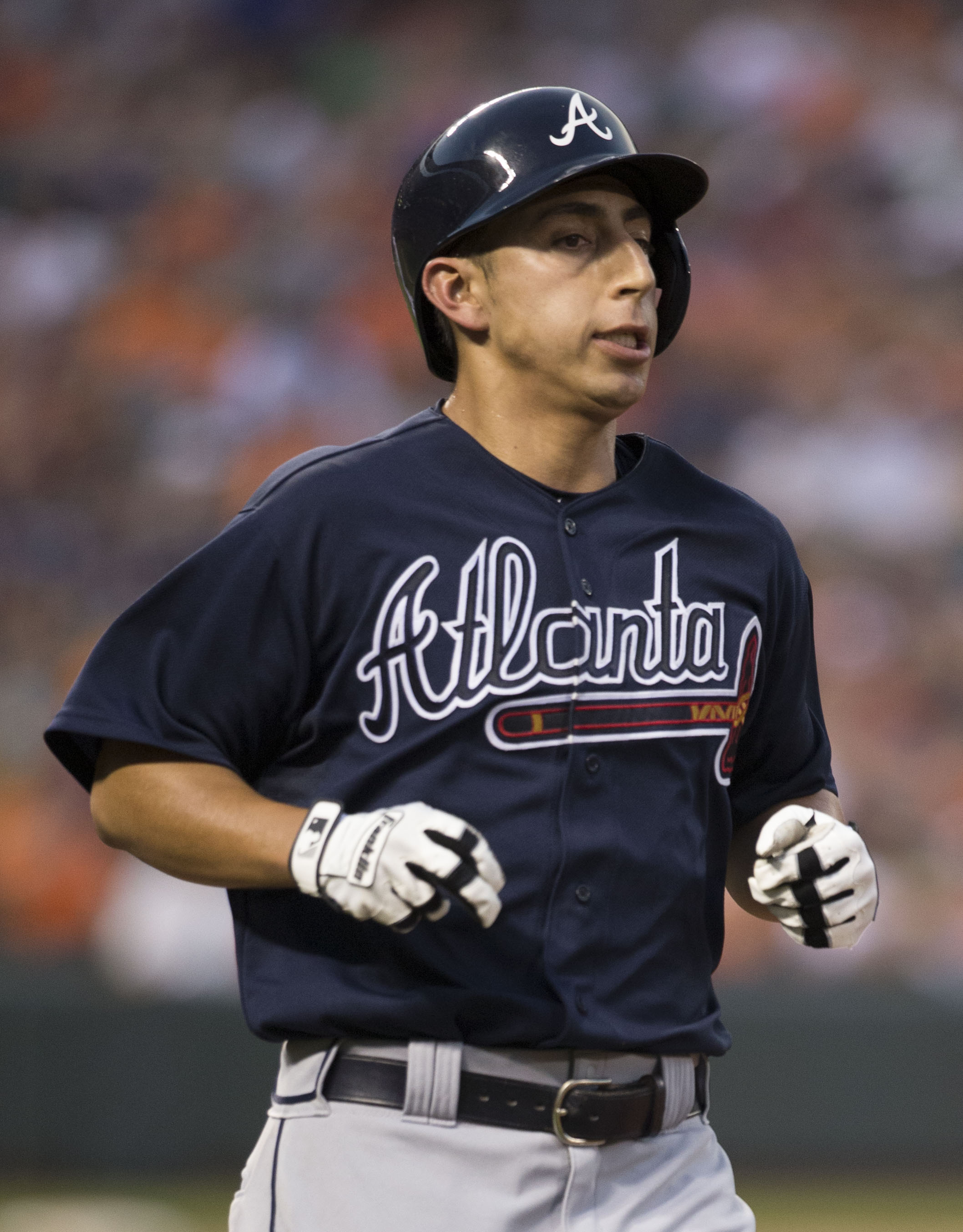
- Castro with the Atlanta Braves

Conspiradores de Querétaro – No. 22
- Infielder
- Born: November 14, 1992 (age 33); Guaymas, Sonora, Mexico
- Bats: Right Throws: Right

MLB debut
- June 17, 2015, for the Atlanta Braves

MLB statistics (through 2018 season)
- Batting average: .210
- Home runs: 3
- Runs batted in: 18
- Stats at Baseball Reference

Teams
- Atlanta Braves (2015–2016); Colorado Rockies (2018)

Daniel Alejandro Castro Cruz (born November 14, 1992) is a Mexican professional baseball infielder for the Conspiradores de Querétaro of the Mexican League. He has previously played in Major League Baseball (MLB) for the Atlanta Braves and Colorado Rockies.

== Career ==
=== Atlanta Braves ===
On May 28, 2010, Castro signed with the Atlanta Braves as a free agent. The Braves organization allowed Castro to play for the Saraperos de Saltillo of the Mexican League to gain experience in 2012 and 2013. In August 2013, the Braves assigned Castro to the Lynchburg Hillcats of the High-A Carolina League.

After Castro began the 2015 season with the Gwinnett Braves of the Triple-A International League, the Braves promoted him to the major leagues for the first time on June 17, 2015. He recorded his first Major league hit against the Boston Red Sox while pinch-hitting for relief pitcher Nick Masset. He was optioned to Gwinnett the next day. The Braves recalled Castro on July 25, after the Braves traded Juan Uribe and Kelly Johnson. Castro was optioned back to Gwinnett on August 8, along with Todd Cunningham, after the Braves acquired Nick Swisher and Michael Bourn from the Cleveland Indians.

Castro was recalled to the major leagues on April 13, 2016, after beginning the season at Gwinnett. He filled in at second base, third base, and shortstop when needed, and hit .182 in 42 games. After starting shortstop Erick Aybar was reactivated on June 12, Castro was optioned to the minors. On October 11, he was removed from the 40–man roster and sent outright to Gwinnett. Castro elected free agency after the season on November 7.

=== Colorado Rockies ===
On November 21, 2016, Castro signed a minor league contract with the Colorado Rockies organization. In 115 games for the Triple–A Albuquerque Isotopes, Castro slashed .306/.344/.398 with three home runs and 45 RBI. He elected free agency following the season on November 6, 2017.

On January 30, 2018, Castro re-signed with the Rockies on a new minor league contract. He was called up to the major leagues on May 1. Castro was designated for assignment on July 21. He elected free agency on October 12.

=== Los Angeles Dodgers ===
On November 12, 2018, Castro signed a minor league contract with the Los Angeles Dodgers. He was assigned to the Triple–A Oklahoma City Dodgers to start the 2019 season, for whom he batted .244/.306/.298 with one home run, 11 RBI, and three stolen bases.

=== Seattle Mariners ===
On July 28, 2019, Castro was traded to the Seattle Mariners in exchange for Kristopher Negrón. In 29 games for the Triple–A Tacoma Rainiers, he slashed .214/.261/.295 with two home runs and seven RBI. Castro elected free agency following the season on November 4.

=== Toros de Tijuana ===
On February 24, 2020, Castro signed with the Toros de Tijuana of the Mexican League. Castro did not play in a game in 2020 due to the cancellation of the Mexican League season because of the COVID-19 pandemic. He made 36 appearances for the team in 2021, hitting .186/.244/.220 with five RBI and three stolen bases.

=== Sultanes de Monterrey ===
On September 27, 2021, Castro, along with P Jake Sanchez and C Victor Ortega, were traded to the Sultanes de Monterrey of the Mexican League. In 2022, he appeared in 22 games, hitting .273/.343/.394 with one home run and nine RBI.

Castro made 34 appearances for the Sultanes in 2023, he batted .220/.289/.281 with one home run, nine RBI, and one stolen base. In 2024, Castro played in 39 games, slashing .302/.350/.396 with one home run and 20 RBI.

Castro made 18 appearances for Monterrey in 2025, hitting .318/.348/.409 with nine RBI and one stolen base.

=== Conspiradores de Querétaro ===
On May 30, 2025, Castro, Tyler Viza, and Michel Báez were traded to the Conspiradores de Querétaro of the Mexican League in exchange for Leonys Martín. In 38 games he hit .235/.313/.294 with 0 home runs, 14 RBIs and 2 stolen bases.
