= Austin Allen (baseball) =

American baseball player (born 1994)

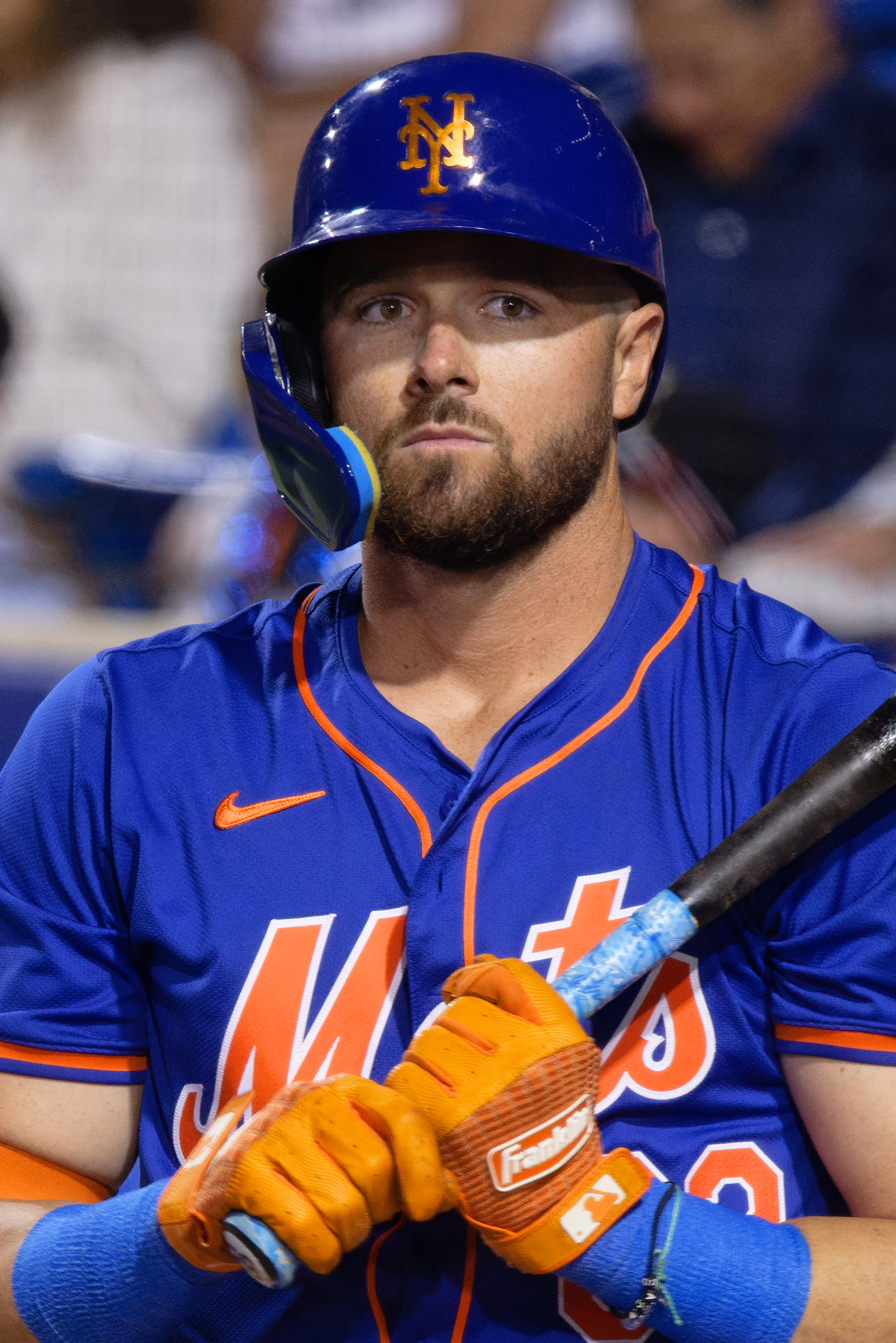
- Allen with the Mets in 2024

Free agent
- Catcher
- Born: January 16, 1994 (age 32); St. Louis, Missouri, U.S.
- Bats: Left Throws: Right

MLB debut
- May 11, 2019, for the San Diego Padres

MLB statistics (through 2022 season)
- Batting average: .195
- Home runs: 2
- Runs batted in: 7
- Stats at Baseball Reference

Teams
- San Diego Padres (2019); Oakland Athletics (2020–2022)

Austin Michael Allen (born January 16, 1994) is an American professional baseball catcher who is a free agent. He has previously played in Major League Baseball (MLB) for the San Diego Padres and Oakland Athletics.

== Career ==
Allen attended Chaminade College Preparatory School in Creve Coeur, Missouri and played college baseball at the Florida Institute of Technology. In 2015, his junior year, he slashed .421/.473/.728 with 11 home runs and 57 RBIs in 49 games. He was drafted by the San Diego Padres in the fourth round (number 117) of the 2015 Major League Baseball draft.

=== San Diego Padres ===
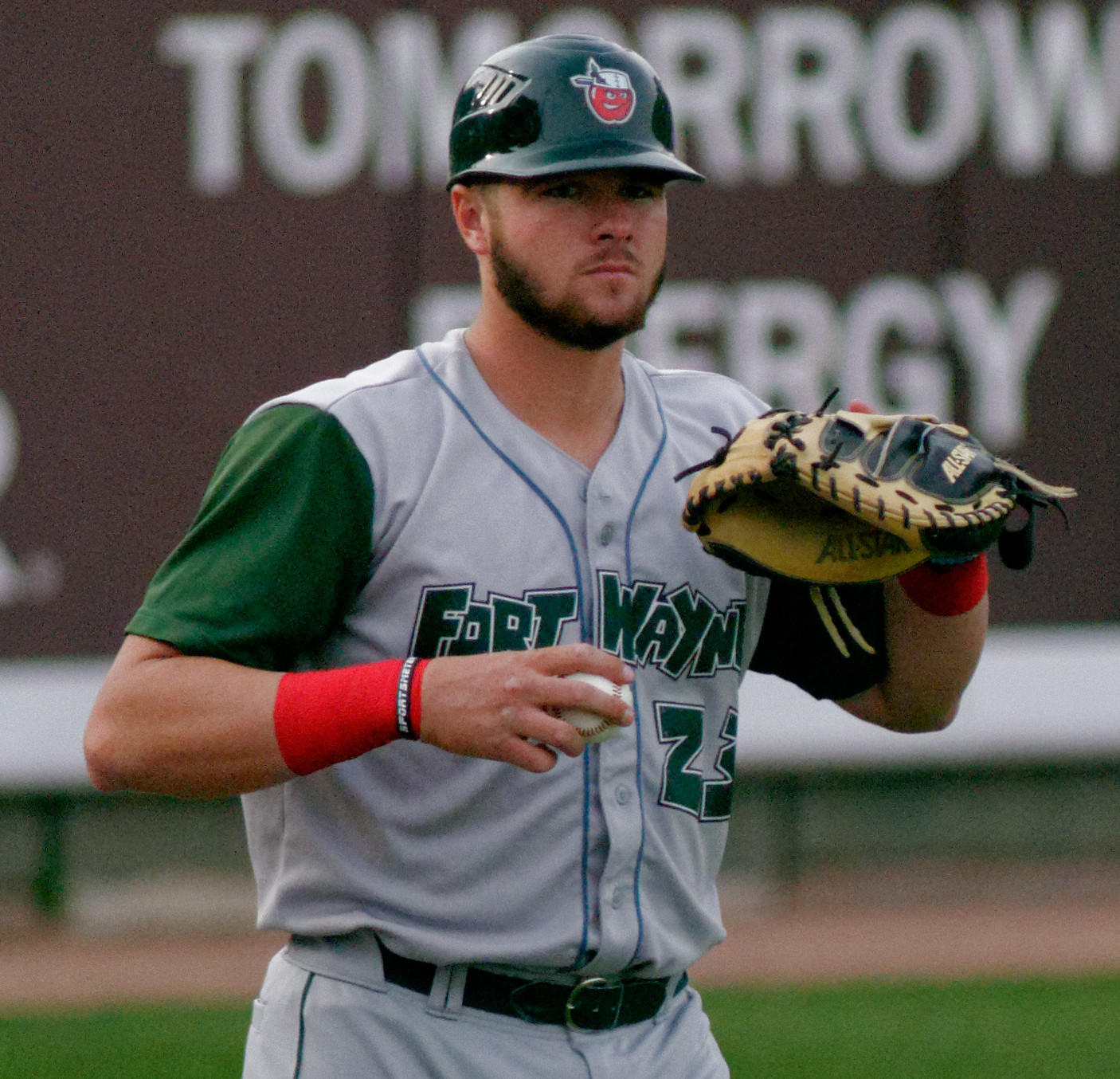
Allen with the Fort Wayne TinCaps in 2016

After signing, Allen made his professional debut with the Tri-City Dust Devils that same year and spent the whole season there, batting .240 with two home runs and 34 RBIs in 53 games. He spent 2016 with the Fort Wayne TinCaps where he slashed .320/.364/.425 with seven home runs, 61 RBIs, and a .791 OPS in 109 games, and also played in three games with the San Antonio Missions at the end of the season. He played 2017 with the Lake Elsinore Storm where he batted .283 with 22 home runs, 81 RBIs, and 31 doubles in 121 games, and he played 2018 with San Antonio, slashing .290/.351/.506 with 22 home runs and 56 RBIs in 119 games.

The Padres added Allen to their 40-man roster after the 2018 season.

He began 2019 with the El Paso Chihuahuas. On May 11, he was called up to the major leagues. He made his debut that night, drawing a walk in a pinch hit appearance versus Wade Davis.

=== Oakland Athletics ===
On December 2, 2019, Allen was traded (along with a player to be named later later revealed to be outfielder Buddy Reed) to the Oakland Athletics in exchange for Jurickson Profar.

Allen hit his first MLB home run against the Texas Rangers on August 5, a two-run shot to give the A's a 5–4 lead they would not relinquish. The A's beat the Rangers 6–4 that night. Two days later, with two outs in the 13th inning and an 0–2 count against him, Allen drove in a run with a single to tie the game at 2, sparking the A's to a come-from-behind 3–2 walk-off win over the Houston Astros.

On August 9, 2020, Allen was ejected for the first time in his career for his role in a bench-clearing incident involving Ramon Laureano and Alex Cintron. Despite the ejection, Major League Baseball decided not to suspend Allen for the incident.

The Athletics designated Allen for assignment on May 2, 2022, and outrighted him to the minor leagues.

=== St. Louis Cardinals ===
On August 2, 2022, Allen was traded to the St. Louis Cardinals in exchange for Carlos Guarate. In 20 games for the Triple–A Memphis Redbirds, he batted .318/.395/.470 with 2 home runs and 14 RBI. He elected free agency following the season on November 10.

=== Miami Marlins ===
On December 5, 2022, Allen signed a minor league contract with the Miami Marlins organization. He played in 91 games for the Triple–A Jacksonville Jumbo Shrimp, batting .225/.312/.491 with 23 home runs and 67 RBI. Allen elected free agency following the season on November 6.

=== New York Mets ===
On January 16, 2024, Allen signed a minor league contract with the New York Mets organization. He split the year between the rookie-level Florida Complex League Mets, Single-A St. Lucie Mets, High-A Brooklyn Cyclones, and Triple-A Syracuse Mets. In 53 combined appearances, Allen hit .251/.293/.411 with eight home runs and 27 RBI. He elected free agency following the season on November 4.

=== Caliente de Durango ===
On January 22, 2025, Allen signed with the Guerreros de Oaxaca of the Mexican League. Allen did not appear for Oaxaca before he signed with the Caliente de Durango on May 19. In five appearances for Durango, he went 3-for-16 (.188) with three RBI and one walk. Allen was released by the Caliente on June 2.
