= Nick Margevicius =

American baseball player (born 1996)

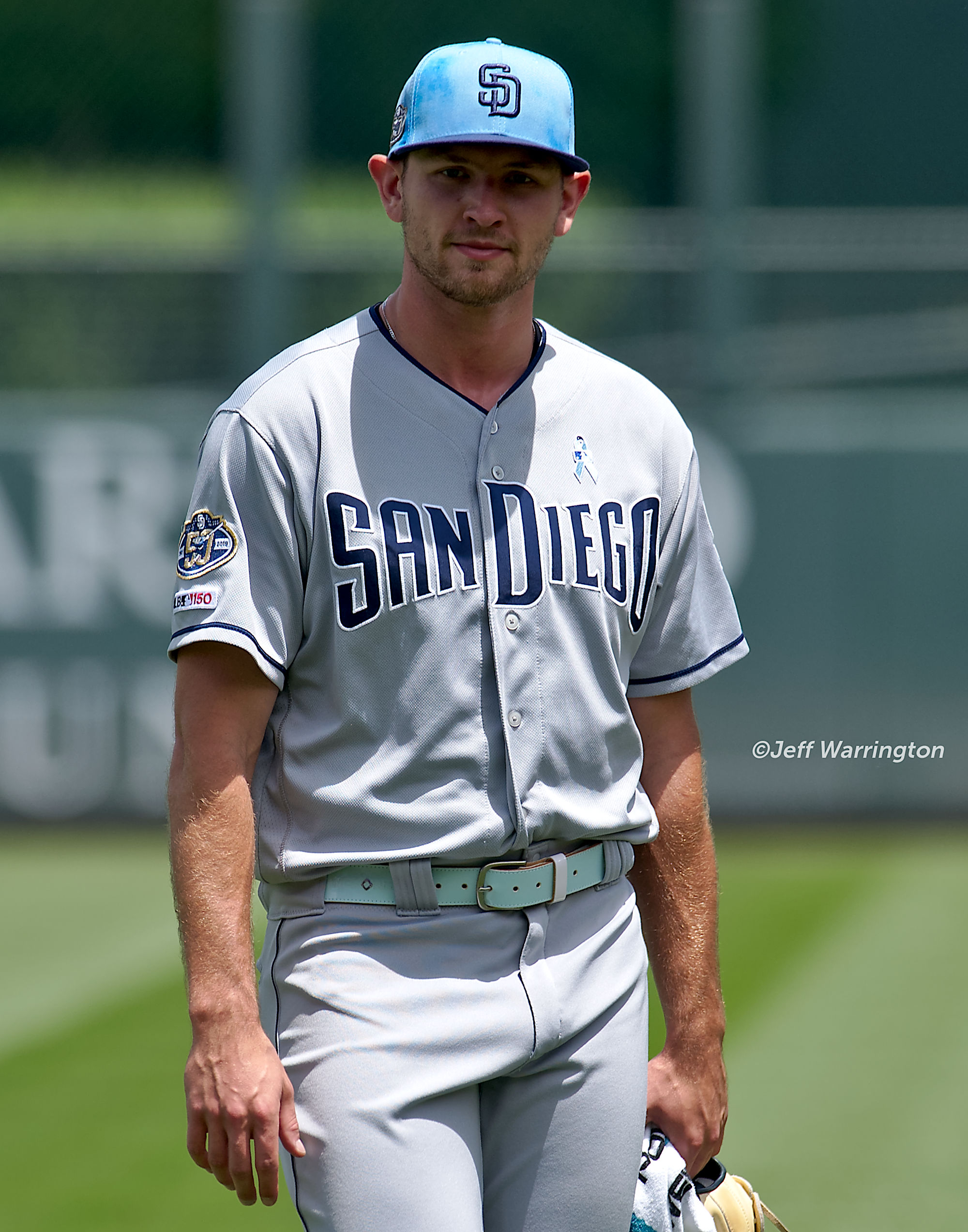
- Margevicius with the San Diego Padres in 2019

Long Island Ducks – No. 25
- Pitcher
- Born: June 18, 1996 (age 30); Cleveland, Ohio, U.S.
- Bats: Left Throws: Left

Professional debut
- MLB: March 30, 2019, for the San Diego Padres
- CPBL: April 17, 2024, for the TSG Hawks

MLB statistics (through 2021 season)
- Win–loss record: 4–11
- Earned run average: 6.12
- Strikeouts: 90

CPBL statistics (through 2024 season)
- Win–loss record: 7–6
- Earned run average: 2.82
- Strikeouts: 86
- Stats at Baseball Reference

Teams
- San Diego Padres (2019); Seattle Mariners (2020–2021); TSG Hawks (2024)

Nicholas Phillip Margevicius (/mɑːrˈɡævɪtʃɪs/ mar-GAV-ih-chiss; born June 18, 1996) is an American professional baseball pitcher for the Long Island Ducks of the Atlantic League of Professional Baseball. He has previously played in Major League Baseball (MLB) for the San Diego Padres and Seattle Mariners, and in the Chinese Professional Baseball League (CPBL) for the TSG Hawks.

== Amateur career ==
Margevicius attended Saint Ignatius High School in Cleveland, Ohio. After high school, Margevicius attended Rider University, where he played college baseball. In 2016, he played collegiate summer baseball with the Wareham Gatemen of the Cape Cod Baseball League. In 2017, as a junior, he went 6-4 with a 2.89 ERA in 14 games (13 starts).

== Professional career ==
=== San Diego Padres ===
==== Minor leagues ====
Margevicius was drafted by the San Diego Padres in the 7th round, 198th overall, in the 2017 Major League Baseball draft.

In his debut season of 2017, Margevicius played for the rookie-level Arizona League Padres and the Low-A Tri-City Dust Devils. He accumulated a 4–1 record with a 1.31 ERA and 62 strikeouts over 48 innings. Margevicius split the 2018 season between the Single-A Fort Wayne TinCaps and High-A Lake Elsinore Storm, accumulating a 10–8 record with a 3.60 ERA and 146 strikeouts in 134 1/3 innings pitched. Margevicius appeared in one game with the Double-A San Antonio Missions during the 2018 Texas League playoffs.

==== Major leagues ====
Margevicius was called up by the Padres on March 30, 2019, and made his major league debut that evening. He recorded five plus innings, allowing one run, while striking out five. Upon selecting what number to wear, Margevicius chose to wear number 25 after his favorite player growing up for his hometown Cleveland Indians was Jim Thome. He became the second player from the 2017 draft class to reach MLB. He was optioned to the Amarillo Sod Poodles on May 17, and was recalled on June 1. He was optioned once again on June 19, returned on August 28, and remained with the Padres thru the remainder of the 2019 season. Margevicius was designated for assignment on January 17, 2020.

=== Seattle Mariners ===
On January 24, 2020, Margevicius was claimed off waivers by the Seattle Mariners. After an injury to the neck caused starter Kendall Graveman to go on the 10-Day disabled list, Margevicius replaced him as the starter. In his debut as a starter for the Mariners, Margevicius pitched 3 1/3 scoreless innings against the Colorado Rockies while recording 3 strikeouts. Margevicius earned his 1st win as a Mariner when he pitched 5 1/3 innings against the Texas Rangers giving up four earned runs on six hits and one walk while striking out seven batters. Margevicius earned his second win as a starter for the Mariners during his last start of the season when he pitched six scoreless innings against the defending AL Pennant winners Houston Astros recording four strikeouts in the process. Margevicius finished the season with a 2–3 record and a 4.57 ERA.

Margevicius made five appearances for the Mariners in 2021, compiling an 0-2 record and 8.25 ERA with 12 strikeouts across 12 innings of work. On May 13, 2021, Margevicius was placed on the 60-day injured list after being diagnosed with thoracic outlet syndrome.

Margevicius was designated for assignment by Seattle on May 5, 2022. On May 9, Margevicius cleared waivers and was sent outright to the Triple-A Tacoma Rainiers. In 33 appearances (seven starts) for Tacoma, he struggled to an 0-4 record and 7.53 ERA with 51 strikeouts over 49 innings of work. Margevicius was released by the Mariners organization on March 6, 2023.

=== Atlanta Braves ===
On April 4, 2023, Margevicius signed a minor league contract with the Atlanta Braves. In 20 games split between the Triple–A Gwinnett Stripers and Double–A Mississippi Braves, he registered a combined 6.82 ERA with 49 strikeouts across 68 2/3 innings pitched. Margevicius elected free agency following the season on November 6.

=== TSG Hawks ===
On January 22, 2024, Margevicius signed with the TSG Hawks of the Chinese Professional Baseball League. In 18 starts for the Hawks, he compiled a 7-6 record and 2.82 ERA with 86 strikeouts across 108 1/3 innings pitched. Margevicius became a free agent following the season.

=== Tecolotes de los Dos Laredos ===
On March 7, 2025, Margevicius signed with the Tecolotes de los Dos Laredos of the Mexican League. In two starts for Dos Laredos, Margevicius posted a 2-0 record and 0.87 ERA with seven strikeouts across 10 1/3 innings pitched.

=== Detroit Tigers ===
On April 29, 2025, Margevicius signed a minor league contract with the Detroit Tigers. He made 17 appearances (14 starts) for the Triple-A Toledo Mud Hens, registering a 5-3 record and 3.89 ERA with 70 strikeouts over 74 innings of work. Margevicius elected free agency following the season on November 6.

=== San Francisco Giants ===
On December 26, 2025, Margevicius signed a minor league contract with the San Francisco Giants. He made three starts split between the rookie-level Arizona Complex League Giants and Single-A San Jose Giants, posting a combined 0-1 record and 8.71 ERA with two strikeouts across 10 1/3 innings pitched. Margevicius was released by the Giants organization on May 20, 2026.

=== Long Island Ducks ===
On July 15, 2026, Margevicius was signed by the Long Island Ducks of the Atlantic League of Professional Baseball.
