= Michel Báez =

Cuban baseball player (born 1996)

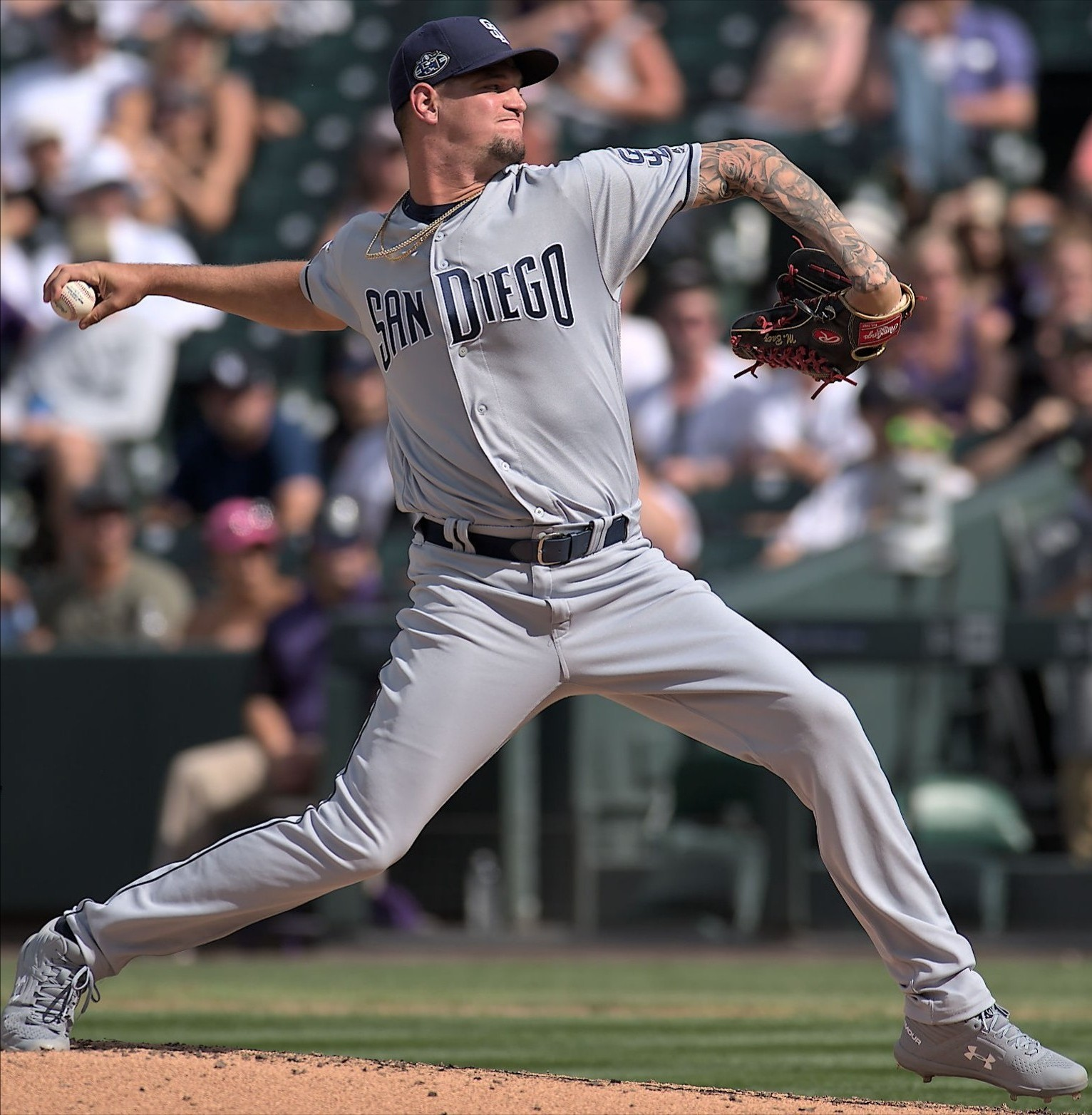
- Báez pitching for the San Diego Padres in 2019

Free agent
- Pitcher
- Born: January 21, 1996 (age 30); Havana, Cuba
- Bats: Right Throws: Right

MLB debut
- July 23, 2019, for the San Diego Padres

MLB statistics (through 2022 season)
- Win–loss record: 1–1
- Earned run average: 3.47
- Strikeouts: 37
- Stats at Baseball Reference

Teams
- San Diego Padres (2019–2020, 2022)

Michel Báez Cruz (born January 21, 1996) is a Cuban professional baseball pitcher who is a free agent. He has previously played in Major League Baseball (MLB) for the San Diego Padres.

== Career ==
=== San Diego Padres ===
Báez played for the Vegueros de Pinar del Río and the Huracanes de Mayabeque of the Cuban National Series in 2014/2015. He signed with the San Diego Padres as an international free agent on December 19, 2016, for $3 million.

Báez made his professional debut in 2017 with the rookie–level Arizona League Padres, and after one start where he gave up two runs and struck out seven in five innings, was promoted to the Single–A Fort Wayne TinCaps where he finished the season, starting ten games, compiling a 6–2 record and 2.45 ERA with 82 strikeouts in 58 2/3 innings pitched.

Following the 2017 season, Báez was rated as the Midwest League's No. 4 prospect according to Baseball America. He also earned Honorable Mention Starting Pitcher honors on the 2017 Yahoo Sports All-Minor League Team. Baez was ranked as the Padres' No. 7 prospect according to MLB.com prior to the 2018 season. He spent the 2018 season with both the High–A Lake Elsinore Storm and the Double–A San Antonio Missions, going 4–10 with a 3.69 ERA in 21 total starts between both teams.

Báez began 2019 with the Double–A Amarillo Sod Poodles, going 3–2 with a 2.00 ERA over 27 innings. He was promoted to the major leagues on July 20, 2019. He made his major league debut on July 23, pitching a scoreless inning of relief versus the New York Mets. In 24 games for the Padres, Báez went 1–1 with a 3.03 ERA and 28 strikeouts over 29 2/3 innings. In 2020, Báez recorded a 7.71 ERA with 7 strikeouts and two walks in 4.2 innings of work across three games (1 start).

On March 31, 2021, it was announced that Báez would require Tommy John surgery and miss the 2021 season. On April 1, he was placed on the 60-day injured list.

On June 6, 2022, Báez was activated off of the injured list and optioned to the Double-A San Antonio Missions. Báez made two scoreless appearances for the Padres in 2022, spending the majority of the year in the minor leagues, where he recorded a 5–3 record and 4.91 ERA in 41 appearances.

Báez was optioned to the Triple-A El Paso Chihuahuas to begin the 2023 season. He was designated for assignment on March 30 after Rougned Odor, David Dahl, and Domingo Tapia were added to the roster. He cleared waivers and was sent outright to El Paso on April 3. He made 32 appearances split between the rookie–level Arizona Complex League Padres, High–A Fort Wayne, Double–A San Antonio, and Triple–A El Paso, accumulating a combined 4–1 record and 6.64 ERA with 34 strikeouts across 40 2/3 innings pitched. Following the season on December 18, Báez was released by the Padres organization.

=== Sultanes de Monterrey ===
On July 5, 2024, Báez signed with the Sultanes de Monterrey of the Mexican League. In seven appearances for Monterrey, he struggled to a 7.50 ERA with five strikeouts across six innings pitched.

Báez made eight appearances for the Sultanes in 2025, but struggled to an 11.25 ERA with three strikeouts over eight innings of work.

=== Conspiradores de Querétaro ===
On May 30, 2025, Báez, Daniel Castro, and Tyler Viza were traded to the Conspiradores de Querétaro of the Mexican League in exchange for Leonys Martín. In 13 appearances (seven starts) for Querétaro, he posted a 3–2 record with a 7.93 ERA, 24 walks, and 25 strikeouts across 36 1/3 innings pitched. On February 17, 2026, Báez was released by the Conspiradores.
