= Brad Wieck =

American baseball player (born 1991)

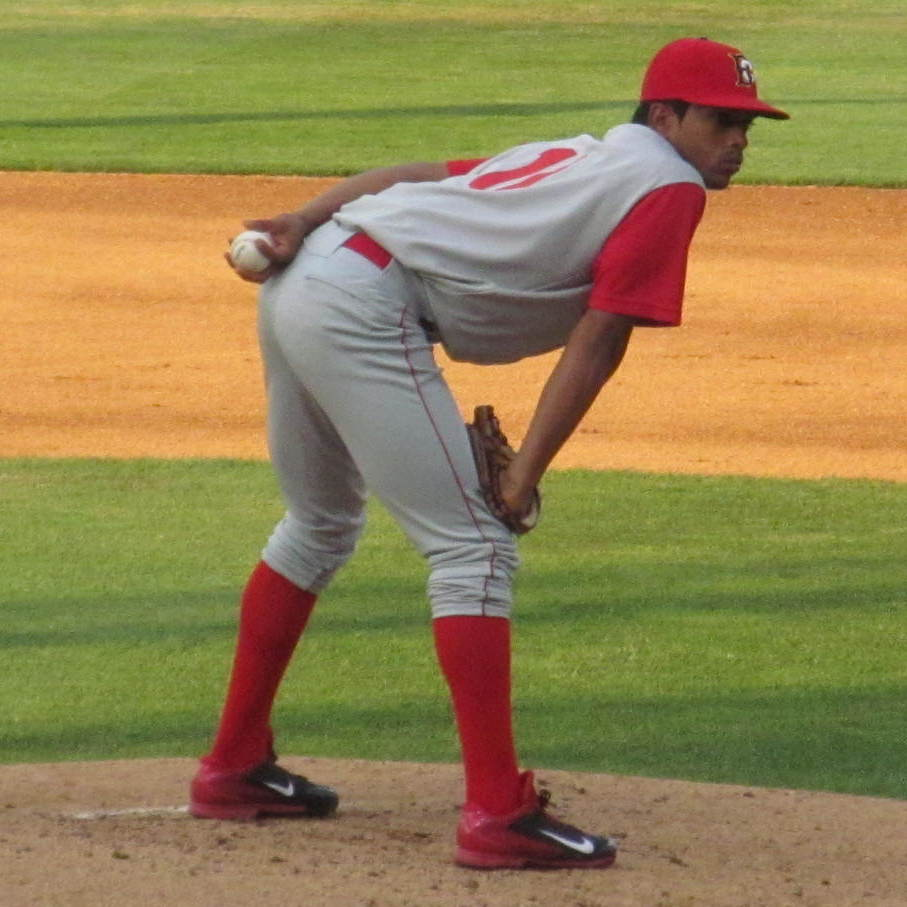
- Wieck with the Brooklyn Cyclones in 2014
- Pitcher
- Born: October 14, 1991 (age 34); Amarillo, Texas, U.S.
- Batted: Left Threw: Left

MLB debut
- September 14, 2018, for the San Diego Padres

Last MLB appearance
- July 6, 2021, for the Chicago Cubs

MLB statistics
- Win–loss record: 2–2
- Earned run average: 3.77
- Strikeouts: 89
- Stats at Baseball Reference

Teams
- San Diego Padres (2018–2019); Chicago Cubs (2019–2021)

Bradley Michael Wieck (/wɪk/ WIK; born October 14, 1991) is an American former professional baseball pitcher. He has previously played in Major League Baseball (MLB) for the San Diego Padres and Chicago Cubs.

== Career ==
=== New York Mets ===
Wieck attended San Jacinto Christian Academy in Amarillo, Texas. After high school he attended Frank Phillips College and was drafted by the Philadelphia Phillies in the 29th round of the 2012 Major League Baseball draft. He did not sign with the Phillies and transferred to Cisco College. After one year at Cisco, he transferred to Oklahoma City University and was drafted by the New York Mets in the seventh round of the 2014 Major League Baseball draft.

Wieck signed and spent 2014 with the Brooklyn Cyclones, posting a 1–1 record and 1.40 ERA in 16 relief appearances. He started 2015 with the Savannah Sand Gnats.

=== San Diego Padres ===
In June, he was acquired by the San Diego Padres as the player to be named later in an earlier trade for Alex Torres. The Padres assigned him to the Class A Fort Wayne TinCaps and later promoted him to the Class A Advanced Lake Elsinore Storm. In 23 total games started between Savannah, Fort Wayne, and Lake Elsinore, he pitched to a 7–11 record, 4.09 ERA, and 1.40 WHIP.

Whereas Wieck had been working as a starter in 2015, starting all 23 games he pitched in and averaging 5 1/3 innings, he began work as a reliever in 2016 and recovered a mid-90s fastball that had lost in the rotation. Wieck pitched 2016 with Lake Elsinore, where he was named an All-Star, and the Double-A San Antonio Missions. In 41 total relief appearances between the two teams, he was 4–1 with a 1.17 ERA along with 93 strikeouts in 61.1 innings. After the season, he played in the Arizona Fall League. Wieck began 2017 with the Triple-A El Paso Chihuahuas, but after posting a 10.29 ERA in his first seven games, was reassigned to San Antonio, where he finished the season, going 2–1 with a 2.64 ERA in 31 appearances out of the bullpen.

After the 2017 season, the Padres added Wieck to their 40-man roster to protect him from the Rule 5 draft.

Wieck began 2018 with San Antonio, but was promoted to El Paso in late June after putting up a 1.93 ERA with the Missions. He had a 3.44 ERA in El Paso and struck out 34 batters in 18 1/3 innings. Wieck was promoted to the Major Leagues in September 2018. He made it into five games in September, striking out 10 while allowing 1 earned run in 7 innings.

Wieck had cancer surgery in January 2019, but returned to the Major League camp in February and worked towards being at full strength by the end of Spring Training. He was 0–1 in 30 games for San Diego.

=== Chicago Cubs ===
Wieck was traded to the Chicago Cubs on July 31, 2019, in exchange for Carl Edwards Jr. Wieck finished the 2019 season allowing only 4 earned runs in 10 innings pitched with the Cubs. In 2020 for Chicago, Wieck appeared in only one game, allowing a two-run home run to Christian Yelich of the Milwaukee Brewers.

Wieck made one appearance for Chicago in April 2021 before being optioned to the Triple-A Iowa Cubs. On May 9, Wieck pitched the seventh and eighth innings of a no-hitter against the Indianapolis Indians at Principal Park in Des Moines, Iowa. Preceded on the mound by Shelby Miller and Tommy Nance, he struck out five batters over two innings before being relieved by Ryan Meisinger who completed the combined no-hit game.

On July 23, 2021, Wieck was placed on the 60-day injured list with an irregular heartbeat. It was announced he would undergo an ablation procedure in an effort to address the issue, similar to another procedure he underwent in February 2020.

On March 17, 2022, Wieck was placed on the 60-day injured list with a left elbow strain. On July 22, it was announced Wieck had undergone Tommy John surgery, and would miss the remainder of the year. Wieck did not pitch during the regular season. On November 10, Wieck was activated from the 60-day injured list and outrighted off the 40-man roster. He elected free agency the same day.

On January 4, 2023, Wieck re-signed with the Cubs organization on a two-year minor league contract. He did not play in a game in 2023 as he continued to recover from injury. Wieck made 21 appearances for Triple–A Iowa in 2024, compiling a 4.94 ERA with 29 strikeouts across 27 1/3 innings pitched. On June 25, 2024, he was released by the Cubs organization.

== Scouting report ==
Wieck is a left-hander with a fastball, slider, and change-up. He is one of the tallest players in Major League Baseball at 6'9". He averaged 92.8 mph with his fastball in the minors in 2018, which was down from the 95 mph speed he had earlier, but all the pitches play faster because of his height.
