= Kirby Yates =

American baseball player (born 1987)

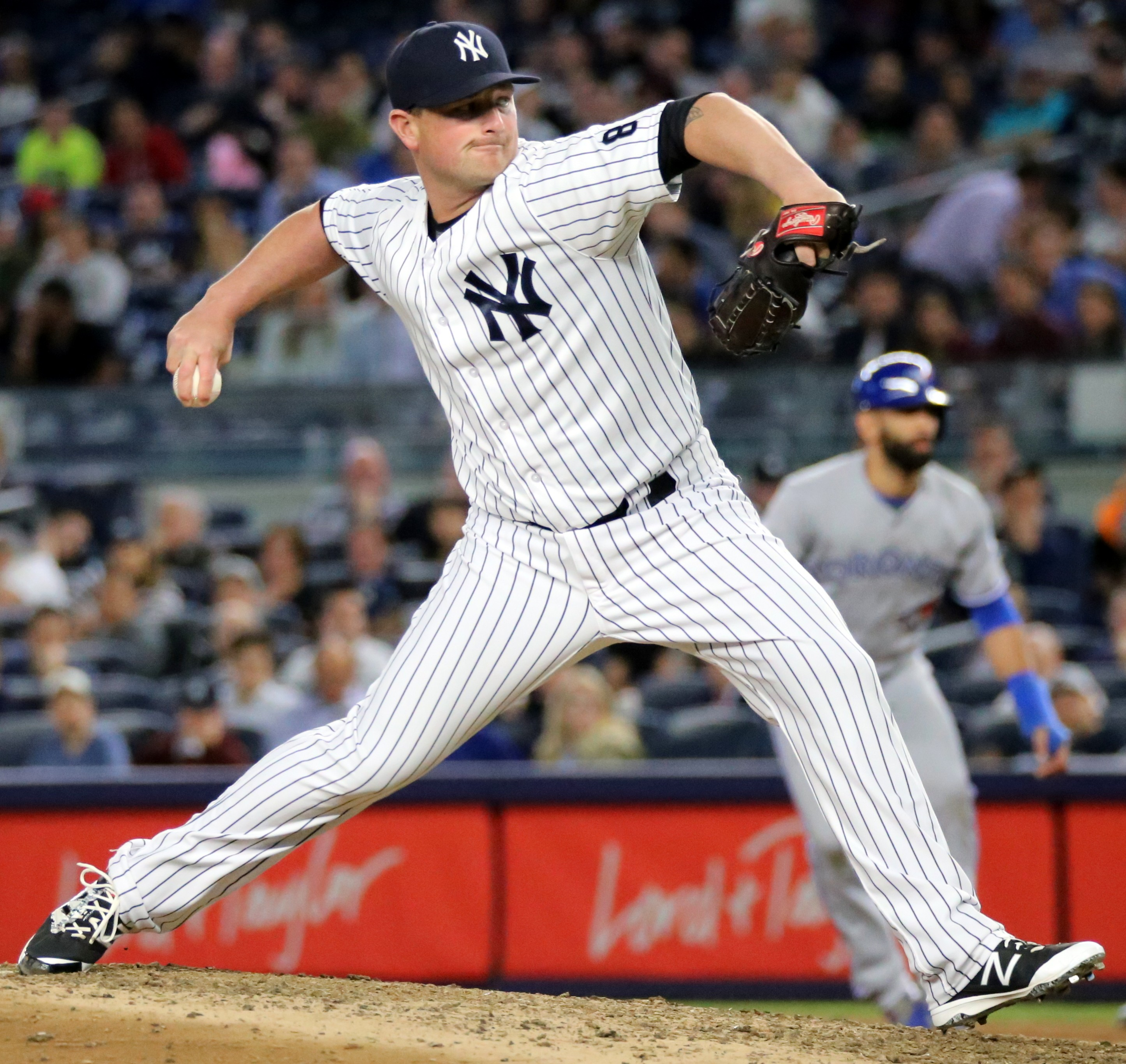
- Yates with the New York Yankees in 2016
- Pitcher
- Born: March 25, 1987 (age 39); Lihue, Hawaii, U.S.
- Batted: Left Threw: Right

MLB debut
- June 7, 2014, for the Tampa Bay Rays

Last MLB appearance
- September 26, 2026, for the Pittsburgh Pirates

MLB statistics
- Win–loss record: 32–29
- Earned run average: 3.35
- Strikeouts: 672
- Saves: 101
- Stats at Baseball Reference

Teams
- Tampa Bay Rays (2014–2015); New York Yankees (2016); Los Angeles Angels (2017); San Diego Padres (2017–2020); Atlanta Braves (2022–2023); Texas Rangers (2024); Los Angeles Dodgers (2025); Los Angeles Angels (2026); Pittsburgh Pirates (2026)

Career highlights and awards
- 2× All-Star (2019, 2024); All-MLB First Team (2019); NL saves leader (2019)

Kirby Kali Yates (born March 25, 1987) is an American former professional baseball pitcher. He played in Major League Baseball (MLB) for the Tampa Bay Rays, New York Yankees, Los Angeles Angels, San Diego Padres, Atlanta Braves, Texas Rangers, Los Angeles Dodgers, and Pittsburgh Pirates.

Yates made his MLB debut in 2014, and was an All-Star in 2019, when he led the National League in saves. He made the All-Star team again in 2024.

== Early career ==
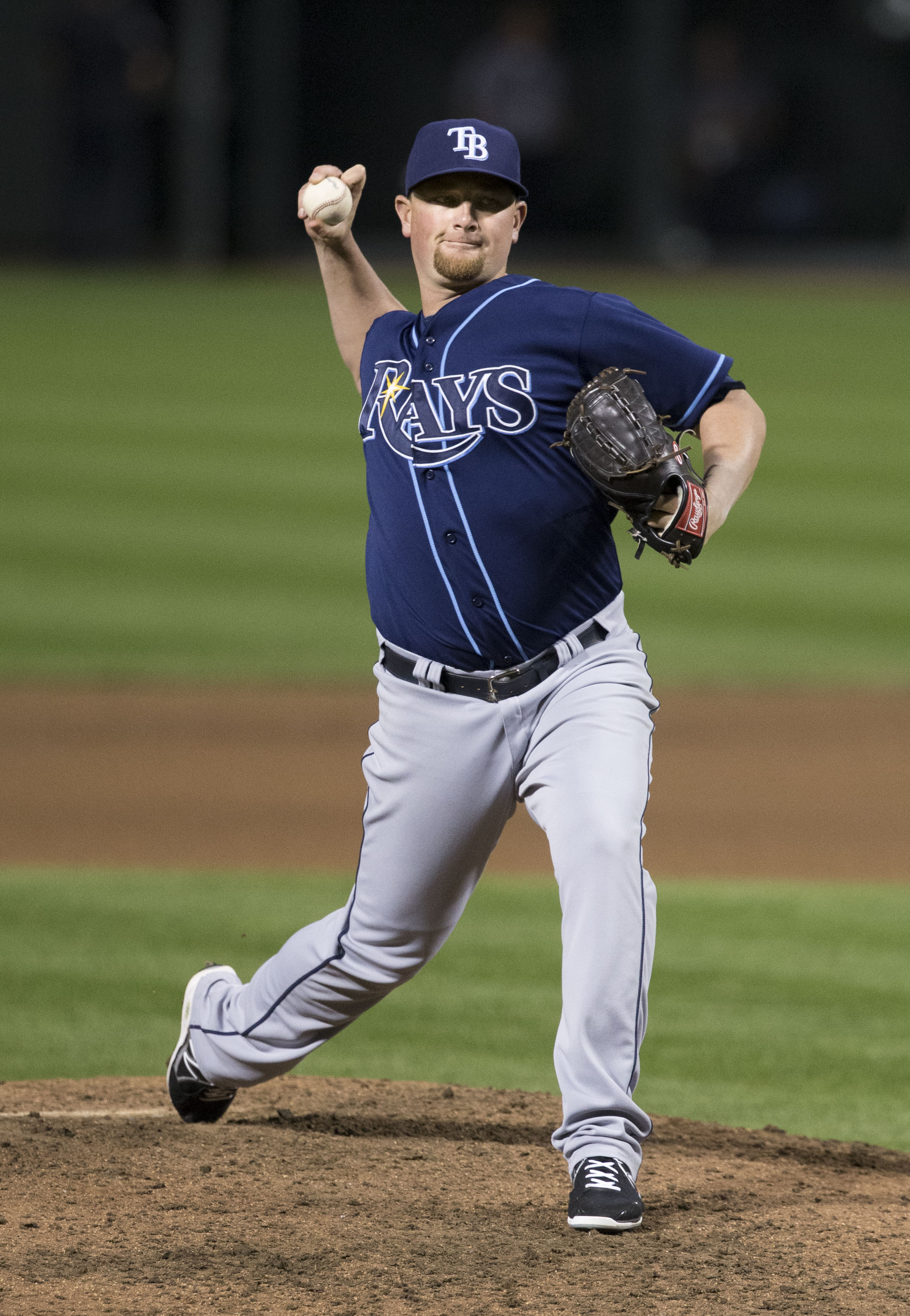
Yates pitching for the Tampa Bay Rays in 2014

Yates was drafted by the Boston Red Sox in the 26th round of the 2005 Major League Baseball draft out of Kauai High School in Lihue, Hawaii. He did not sign and attended Yavapai College. He missed both the 2006 and 2007 seasons due to Tommy John surgery.

== Professional career ==
=== Tampa Bay Rays ===
After going undrafted in the 2009 MLB draft, Yates signed with the Tampa Bay Rays as an amateur free agent on June 22, 2009, and began his professional career with the Princeton Rays of the Appalachian League. In 2010, he spent most of the season with the Bowling Green Hot Rods of the Midwest League, where he was 3–6 record with a 3.30 ERA in 27 games (12 starts). He was promoted to the Charlotte Stone Crabs of the Florida State League on August 12, but made only one start before he was shut down for the year with a strained right shoulder that required offseason surgery. The surgery caused him to also miss the first two months of the 2011 season before rehabbing in the Gulf Coast League and then rejoining Charlotte on June 22. Yates made 16 appearances with them, allowing only six runs in 33 1/3 innings over 16 appearances and played with the Surprise Saguaros in the Arizona Fall League after the regular season ended.

In 2012, Yates reached the Double-A level with the Montgomery Biscuits, where he had a 2.65 ERA and 94 strikeouts in 68 innings over 50 games. His 12.44 strikeouts per nine innings led all Southern League pitchers and he again returned to the Arizona Fall League, this time with the Phoenix Desert Dogs. Yates was a Triple-A All-Star in 2013, putting up a 1.90 ERA in 51 games for the Durham Bulls. He was also selected as the Rays organizations Minor League Relief Pitcher of the Year while recording 16 saves.

Yates was added to the Rays 40-man roster on November 20, 2013 and made 21 appearances for Durham, allowing only one run in 25 innings. Yates was called up to the majors for the first time on June 7, 2014, and made his debut that day, pitching 1 1/3 scoreless innings against the Seattle Mariners with two strikeouts (his first being against Brad Miller). In 37 games, he posted an ERA of 3.75 in 36 innings, striking out 42. The following season he struggled, posting an ERA of 7.97 in 20 1/3 innings for the Major League club and 5.68 in 25 1/3 innings for Durham as he shuttled back and forth between the majors and minors.

The Rays designated Yates for assignment after the 2015 season.

=== New York Yankees ===
On November 25, 2015, the Rays traded Yates to the Cleveland Indians for cash considerations. He was subsequently designated for assignment on January 5, 2016, and three days later traded to the New York Yankees in exchange for cash considerations. Yates made the Yankees' Opening Day roster in 2016 and pitched in relief for the Yankees for most of the season, although he was optioned to Triple-A Scranton/Wilkes-Barre on June 28, and then recalled on August 17. In 41 games for the Yankees, he posted an ERA of 5.23 and 50 strikeouts in 41 1/3 innings.

=== Los Angeles Angels ===
After the 2016 season, the Los Angeles Angels claimed Yates from the Yankees on waivers. He was designated for assignment on April 2, 2017, after failing to secure a spot in the Angels bullpen during spring training, and he was outrighted from the 40-man roster and sent to the Triple-A Salt Lake Bees on April 5. After six games in the minors, Yates made his Angels debut as a reliever on April 22 against the Toronto Blue Jays and allowed a two-run home run to Kevin Pillar before retiring the next three batters he faced. He was designated for assignment the next day.

=== San Diego Padres ===
On April 26, 2017, Yates was claimed off waivers by the San Diego Padres. He excelled relieving for the Padres, striking out 87 in 55 2/3 innings and going 4–5 with a 3.72 ERA in 61 games. Yates credited his success this season to the development of a split-finger fastball in the spring which he began throwing more often with the Padres.

In 2018, Yates began the season as the setup man to closer Brad Hand. He briefly went to the disabled list in early April with an ankle injury, but returned after two weeks. At the trade deadline, the Padres traded Hand, thus handing over the closer role to Yates. He ended the season with a career low 2.14 ERA in 65 appearances and was 12 for 13 in save opportunities with 90 strikeouts in 63 innings. At the conclusion of the 2018 season, Yates was selected to represent Major League Baseball at the 2018 MLB Japan All-Star Series.

In 2019, Yates was selected as the Padres' sole representative at the All-Star Game. For the season, he led all major league pitchers in saves, with 41. He also recorded a 1.19 ERA and struck out 101 batters in 60 2/3 innings and was named to the 2019 All-MLB Team.

Yates made six appearances during the pandemic shortened 2020 season, allowing six runs in 4 1/3 innings before he was shut down because of bone chips in his elbow.

=== Toronto Blue Jays ===
On January 20, 2021, Yates signed a one-year, $5.5 million contract with the Toronto Blue Jays. However, on March 22, he was diagnosed with a flexor strain and he underwent a second Tommy John surgery on March 24, ending his season.

=== Atlanta Braves ===
On November 29, 2021, Yates signed a two-year, $8.25 million contract with the Atlanta Braves. On July 16, 2022, he pitched a perfect inning in the Florida Complex League, his first game at any level since August 2020. Yates was activated off of the injured list on August 10 and allowed four runs in seven innings in nine games at the end of the season.

In 2023, his first full season since 2019, he pitched 60 1/3 innings over 60 games, allowing 22 runs for a 3.28 ERA. On November 6, 2023, the Braves declined the option on Yates' contract for the 2024 season, making him a free agent

=== Texas Rangers ===
On December 6, 2023, Yates signed a one-year, $4.5 million contract with the Texas Rangers. In 61 games, he allowed eight earned runs in 61 2/3 innings for a 1.17 ERA, 85 strikeouts, and converted 33 of 34 save opportunities. He was named to his second career All-Star team.

=== Los Angeles Dodgers ===
On January 30, 2025, Yates signed a one-year, $13 million contract with the Los Angeles Dodgers. He pitched in 50 games for the Dodgers, with a 4–3 record, 5.23 ERA and 52 strikeouts in 41 1/3 innings. The Dodgers lost confidence in him as the season went on and did not use him unless they were ahead or behind by multiple runs and they ended his season by putting him on the injured list on September 24.

=== Los Angeles Angels (second stint) ===
On January 6, 2026, Yates signed a one-year, $5 million contract with the Los Angeles Angels. Yates was assigned to the injured list with left knee inflammation and did not make the Angels' Opening Day roster. He was activated from the injured list on May 5 and made his first appearance for the club a few days later. Yates made 31 appearances for Los Angeles, posting an 0–5 record and 3.95 ERA with 36 strikeouts and three saves across 27 1/3 innings pitched.

=== Pittsburgh Pirates ===
On August 3, 2026, the Angels traded Yates to the Pittsburgh Pirates in exchange for Kyle Robinson. After 517 appearances, all in relief, Yates started his first game on September 26 against the Detroit Tigers opposite Justin Verlander in Verlander's final career start. Yates left the game after 1.2 innings without allowing a run. Following the game, he announced his retirement.

== Personal life ==
His brother, Tyler Yates, also played in Major League Baseball. Tyler has since been a police officer in Kauai.

Yates married his long-time girlfriend Ashlee on January 2, 2016. She owns a business that places sitters with professional athlete families, Homerun Sitters LLC. His hobbies include surfing and golfing.

== See also ==
- List of Major League Baseball annual saves leaders
